= Kawade Shobō Shinsha =

Japanese publishing company

- Native name: Kabushiki Kaisha Kawade Shobō Shinsha (株式会社河出書房新社)
- Type: KK
- Industry: Publishing
- Genre: Books, magazines
- Founded: 1886; 140 years ago
- Founder: Seiichirō Kawade
- Headquarters: 2-13 Higashigokenchō, Shinjuku, Tokyo, Japan
- Key people: Yū Onodera (Representative Director & CEO)
- Number of employees: 74 (1 April 2020)
- Website: www.kawade.co.jp

Kawade Shobō Shinsha., Ltd. (株式会社河出書房新社, Kabushiki Kaisha Kawade Shobō Shinsha), formerly Kawade Shobō (河出書房), is a publisher founded in 1886 in Japan. It is headquartered in Higashigokenchō, Shinjuku, Tokyo. It publishes the magazine Bungei and administers the Bungei Prize.

== History ==
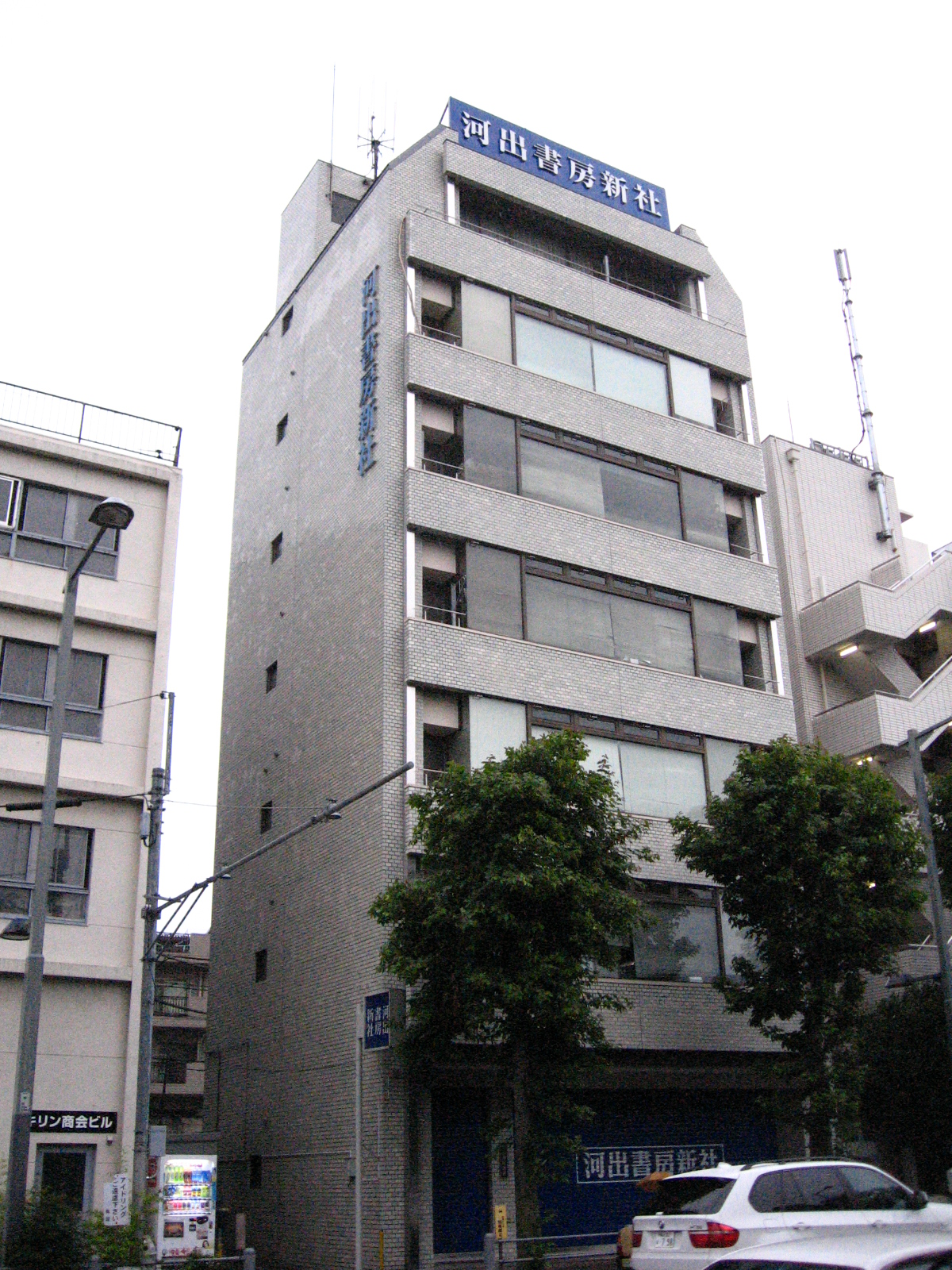
Kawade Shobō Shinsha's former headquarters in Shibuya, Tokyo

Kawade Shobō Shinsha traces its history to 1886 when a new branch of the Seibidō (成美堂) bookstore in Gifu Prefecture was opened by Seiichirō Kawade (1857–1936) in Nihonbashi, Tokyo. In 1888, it became independent and published primarily textbooks and reference books in the fields of mathematics, physics, geography and agriculture.

In 1933, it was established as a literary publisher and renamed to Kawade Shobō (河出書房) by Seiichirō's son-in-law Takao Kawade (1901–1965), who served as its second president. It primarily published literary and arts books, as well as books on philosophy and various schools of thought. In 1944, the publishing house acquired the literary magazine Bungei from Kaizōsha (改造社). In 1945, Kawade Shobō was damaged during the Bombing of Tokyo and moved to Kanda-Ogawamachi in Chiyoda, Tokyo. In July 1949, Kawade Shobō published Yukio Mishima's breakout second novel Confessions of a Mask. In 1951, Kawade Shobō published the major best-selling nonfiction book by Shintarō Ryū, titled Mono no Mikata ni Tsuite (ものの見方について).

In 1957, Kawade Shobō went bankrupt. Publication of Bungei was suspended. A new company named Kawade Shobō Shinsha was established on 2 May 1957. In 1962, Kawade Shobō Shinsha relaunched the Bungei magazine and established the Bungei Prize, which is given to new authors. It was first awarded to Kazumi Takahashi's 1962 novel Vessel of Sorrow. Many of the Prize's winners became major bestsellers, including Yasuo Tanaka's 1981 novel Somehow, Crystal, and Akemi Hotta's 1981 novel 1980 Aiko 16-sai. The Bungei Prize has produced many successful writers, including Amy Yamada, Mayumi Nagano, Tomoyuki Hoshino, Maki Kashimada, Kou Nakamura, Risa Wataya, Keisuke Hada, Gen Shiraiwa, Nao-Cola Yamazaki, Nanae Aoyama and Ken'ichirō Isozaki.

In 1965, Takao Kawade died and his son Tomohisa Kawade became the company's third president. In 1968, the company went bankrupt once again. Tomohisa applied for the Corporate Reorganization Law and the company was rebuilt. Takayuki Nakajima took over the company's leadership. In 1977, the company moved to Sumiyoshi-chō, Shinjuku and Masaru Shimizu assumed leadership of the company. In 1979, it moved Sendagaya, Shibuya.

In 1983, Kawade Shobō Shinsha published Jūrō Kara's novel Sagawa-kun Kara no Tegami, which was awarded the prestigious Akutagawa Prize and became a major bestseller and sensation in Japan. In 1987, Kawade Shobō Shinsha published Machi Tawara's debut collection of tanka poems, Salad Anniversary. It also published Tawara's collections Kaze no Tenohira (1991) and Chocolate Revolution (1997). Salad Anniversary was a major bestseller, selling 2.8 million copies. In the 1990s, Masaya Nakahara and Shū Fujisawa and other writers published their debut works through Kawade Shobō Shinsha. At the end of the 1990s, there was a boom of young writers centered around Bungei. In 1998, Kawade Shobō Shinsha coined the term J-bungaku, a genre of easily consumable contemporary Japanese literature for the average young city dweller.

In 2002, Shigeo Wakamori became president of Kawade Shobō Shinsha.

In January 2004, Risa Wataya was awarded the 130th Akutagawa Prize for her novel I Want to Kick You in the Back (蹴りたい背中, Keritai Senaka). At age 19, she became the award's youngest winner. The novel was published in hardcover by Kawade Shobō Shinsha in August 2003. Within two months of winning the Akutagawa Prize, the novel sold over one million copies.

In 2011, Yū Onodera was appointed president of Kawade Shobō Shinsha.

In 2014, four young employees of Kawade Shobō Shinsha voiced concerns over the significant increase in sales of books and magazines in Japan which feature an Anti-Chinese sentiment and Anti-Korean sentiment. Kawade Shobō Shinsha organized an in-store fair to sell objective publications about Japanese social issues, titled 今、この国を考える〜「嫌」でもなく「呆」でもなく (Ima, Kono Kuni o Kangaeru〜 "Iya" de mo Naku "Hō" de mo Naku). The selection was conducted in collaboration with writers and critics, including Eiji Oguma, Toshiki Okada, Kazuhiro Soda, Kyoko Nakajima, Keiichiro Hirano, Tomoyuki Hoshino and Tatsuya Mori. A total of 18 books were selected, including 6 books published by Kawade Shobō Shinsha and 12 books published by other companies. This included books focused on China and South Korea, but also books about consumption tax, public assistance, modern history, constitutional law, and religion. Over 100 bookstores in Japan participated in the fair.

In March 2024, the company announced it would be relocating its headquarters to Higashigokenchō in Shinjuku, where it would start operations on 7 May 2024.

== Publications ==
=== Magazine ===
- Bungei

=== Book series ===
- Kawade Bunko (河出文庫)
- Kawade Books (河出ブックス)
- Sekai no Daishisō (世界の大思想)
- Kawade Yume Mook (KAWADE夢ムック)
- Kawade Michi no Techō (KAWADE道の手帖)
- Kawade Shinsho (河出新書)
- Kawade Yume Shinsho (KAWADE夢新書)
- Kowloon Comics (九龍コミックス)
- Fukurō no Hon (ふくろうの本)
- Ranpu no Hon (らんぷの本)
- Kisō Korekushon (奇想コレクション)
- 14-sai no Yowatari Jutsu (14歳の世渡り術)
- Ikezawa Natsuki / Kojin Henshū / Sekai Bungaku Zenshū (池澤夏樹＝個人編集「世界文学全集」)
- Ikezawa Natsuki / Kojin Henshū / Nippon Bungaku Zenshū (池澤夏樹＝個人編集「日本文学全集」)
