= 2015 in Japanese literature =

The following is an overview of the year 2015 in Japanese literature. It includes winners of literary awards, yearly best-sellers, title debuts and endings, and deaths of notable Japanese literature-related people, as well as any other relevant Japanese literature-related events. For an overview of the year in literature from other countries, see 2015 in literature; for an overview of the year in manga (Japanese comics), see 2015 in manga.

== Awards ==
- Agatha Christie Award:
- Akutagawa Prize:
  - Keisuke Hada for Scrap and Build (スクラップアンドビルド)
  - Naoki Matayoshi for Hibana (火花) ("A Spark")
  - Yūshō Takiguchi for 死んでいない者
  - Yukiko Motoya for 異類婚姻譚
- Bungei Prize
  - Hiroka Yamashita for ドール
  - Ushio Hatakeyama for 地の底の記憶
- Dazai Osamu Prize: Akari Itō for 変わらざる喜び
- Dengeki Novel Prize Grand Prize:
  - 松村涼哉 for ただ、それだけでよかったんです
  - 角埜杞真 for トーキョー下町ゴールドクラッシュ！
- Edogawa Rampo Prize: Katsuhiro Go for Dotoku no Jikan (道徳の時間)
- Honkaku Mystery Award:
  - Best Fiction: Yutaka Maya for Sayonara Kamisama (さよなら神様)
  - Best Critical Work: Aoi Shimotsuki for Agasa Kurisuti Kanzen Koryaku (アガサ・クリスティー完全攻略; The Definitive Guide to Agatha Christie)
- Izumi Kyōka Prize for Literature
  - Mayumi Nagano for 冥途あり
  - Katsuyuki Shinohara for 骨風
- Japan Booksellers' Award: Nahoko Uehashi for Shika no Ou
- Mephisto Prize: Magi Inoue for Koi to Kinki no Purediketto [Predicate] (恋と禁忌の述語論理)
- Mishima Yukio Prize: Takahiro Ueda for 私の恋人
- Mystery Writers of Japan Award:
  - Best Novel:
    - Ryōe Tsukimura for Dobaku no Hana
    - Kazuma Hayami for Inosento Deizu (イノセント・デイズ; Innocent Days)
  - Best Critical/Biographical Work:
    - Masahiko Kikuni for Hondana Tantei Saigo no Aisatsu (本棚探偵最後の挨拶)
    - Aoi Shimotsuki for Agasa Kurisuti Kanzen Koryaku (アガサ・クリスティー完全攻略; The Definitive Guide to Agatha Christie)
- Naoki Prize:
  - Akira Higashiyama for 流
  - Bunpei Aoyama for つまをめとらば
- Nihon SF Taisho Award:
  - Koronbia zero (Columbia Zero) by Kōshū Tani
  - Toppen by Hiroyuki Morioka
- Noma Award for the Translation of Japanese Literature: Kwon Young-joo for Riku Onda's Sangatsu wa Fukaki Kurenai no Fuchi wo
- Noma Literary Prize : Mayumi Nagano for 冥途あり
- Seiun Award:
  - Best Japanese Novel: Orbital Cloud (オービタル・クラウド) by Taiyō Fujii
  - Best Japanese Short Story: "Umi no Yubi" (海の指星) by Hirotaka Tobi
- Sogen SF Short Story Prize: Iori MIyazawa for 神々の歩法
- Tanizaki Prize: Kaori Ekuni for ヤモリ、カエル、シジミチョウ
- Yamamoto Shūgorō Prize: Asako Yuzuki for ナイルパーチの女子会
- Yomiuri Prize:
  - Fiction: Hideo Furukawa for 女たち三百人の裏切りの書
  - Drama: Haruhiko Arai for この国の空

== Best-sellers ==
=== Light novel titles ===
The following is a list of the 10 best-selling light novel titles in Japan during 2015 according to Oricon.

| Rank | Title | Author(s) | Copies |
|---|---|---|---|
| 1 | Is It Wrong to Try to Pick Up Girls in a Dungeon? | Fujino Ōmori (story), Suzuhito Yasuda (art) | 1,220,217 |
| 2 | The Irregular at Magic High School | Tsutomu Satō (story), Kan Ishida (art) | 1,175,978 |
| 3 | My Teen Romantic Comedy SNAFU | Wataru Watari (story), Ponkan8 (art) | 1,050,446 |
| 4 | Overlord | Kugane Maruyama (story), so-bin (art) | 927,413 |
| 5 | Naruto Story Series | several | 883,833 |
| 6 | Sword Art Online | Reki Kawahara (story), abec (art) | 788,895 |
| 7 | Kagerou Daze | Jin (Shizen no Teki-P) (story), Sidu (art) | 494,721 |
| 8 | Kokuhaku Yokō Renshū | Tōko Fujitani (story), Yamako (art) | 413,663 |
| 9 | Shinyaku Toaru Majutsu no Index | Kazuma Kamachi (story), Kiyotaka Haimura (art) | 405,666 |
| 10 | Sword Art Online: Progressive | Reki Kawahara (story), abec (art) | 390,856 |

=== Light novel volumes ===
The following is a list of the 10 best-selling light novel volumes in Japan during 2015 according to Oricon.

| Rank | Volume | Author(s) | Copies |
|---|---|---|---|
| 1 | Sword Art Online: Progressive vol. 3 | Reki Kawahara (story), abec (art) | 325,991 |
| 2 | Sword Art Online vol. 16 | Reki Kawahara (story), abec (art) | 285,081 |
| 3 | Kagerou Daze VI -over the dimension- | Jin (Shizen no Teki-P) (story), Sidu (art) | 255,785 |
| 4 | The Irregular at Magic High School vol. 16 | Tsutomu Satō (story), Kan Ishida (art) | 251,640 |
| 5 | The Irregular at Magic High School vol. 15 | Tsutomu Satō (story), Kan Ishida (art) | 247,532 |
| 6 | The Boy and the Beast | Mamoru Hosoda | 244,336 |
| 7 | My Teen Romantic Comedy SNAFU vol. 10 | Wataru Watari (story), Ponkan8 (art) | 224,761 |
| 8 | Naruto: Kakashi's Story | Akira Higashiyama | 217,136 |
| 9 | My Teen Romantic Comedy SNAFU vol. 10.5 | Wataru Watari (story), Ponkan8 (art) | 207,460 |
| 10 | The Irregular at Magic High School vol. 17 | Tsutomu Satō (story), Kan Ishida (art) | 194,973 |

== Title debuts ==
- January 25 - Ascendance of a Bookworm by Miya Kazuki (story) and You Shiina (art)
- February 7 - Accomplishments of the Duke's Daughter by Futaba Hazuki
- February 28 - Isekai Shokudō by Junpei Inuzuka (story) and Katsumi Enami (art)
- March 20 - 2.43: Seiin High School Boys Volleyball Team by Yukako Kabei (story) and Aiji Yamakawa (art)
- June 20 - Assault Lily by Kasama Hiroyuki (story), Yaegashi Nan and Mieko Hosoi (art)
- June 25 - Arifureta by Ryo Shirakome (story) and Takayaki (art)
- August 1 - Gangsta by Jun'ichi Kawabata
- October 20 - Babylon by Mado Nozaki (story) and Zain (art)
- December 18 - Dagashi Kashi: Mō Hitotsu no Natsu Yasumi by Manta Aisora
- December 25 - Violet Evergarden by Kana Akatsuki (story) and Akiko Takase (art)

== Title endings ==
- May 1 - Attack on Titan: Harsh Mistress of the City by Ryō Kawakami (story) and Range Murata (art)
