= Bungei (magazine) =

Japanese literary magazine

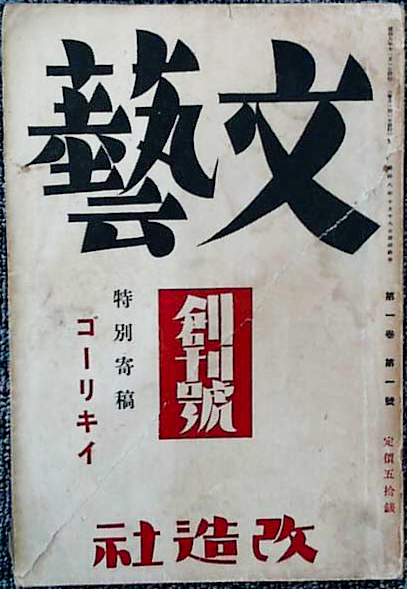
The cover of the first issue of Bungei in October, 1933.

Bungei (Japanese: 文藝) (English, "The Literary Arts") is a Japanese literary magazine published by Kawade Shobō Shinsha.

It was first published by the Kaizōsha (改造社) publishing firm from November 1933 until July 1944. Contributors included Ishizaka Yōjirō, Dazai Osamu, Okamoto Kanoko, Hayashi Fumiko, Takami Jun, Nakano Shigeharu, Oda Sakunosuke, Kubokawa Tsurujirō, Kamei Katsuichirō, Hayashi Fusao, Uno Kōji and Miyamoto Yuriko. When Kaizōsha was closed by the Japanese government in 1944, the magazine name was taken over by the publisher Kawade Shobō Shinsha.

Authors such as Satō Haruo, Kawabata Yasunari, Dazai Osamu, Ibuse Masuji and Mishima Yukio initially wrote for the new magazine. From the 1950s Noma Hiroshi, Nakamura Shin'ichirō and Nakamura Mitsuo were added. The magazine was discontinued in 1957.

Since its resumption in 1962, the magazine has once again published original articles and reviews of contemporary literature. Contributions were made or made by Takahashi Kazumi, Ishihara Shintarō, Masahiro Mita and Jūrō Kara. Until 1980 the magazine was published monthly. It has been published quarterly since 1980. Since 2011 the editor-in-chief has been Ikezawa Natsuki.

The publisher has been awarding the Bungei Prize (文藝賞, Bungeishō), every November since 1962. The Prize is intended to recognize new writers. Prizewinners have included Yasuo Tanaka, Akemi Hotta, Risa Wataya and Natsu Minami.

Along with Shinchō (新潮), Gunzo (群像), Bungakukai (文學界) and Subaru (すばる), Bungei is one of the five leading literary magazines of Japan.
