= Japan Fantasy Novel Award =

Annual book contest

- Native name: 日本ファンタジーノベル大賞
- Description: Annual literary award recognizing unpublished fantasy novel manuscripts
- Country: Japan
- Presented by: Yomiuri Shimbun, Shimizu Corporation, and Shinchosha

The Japan Fantasy Novel Award (日本ファンタジーノベル大賞, Nihon Fantashī Noberu Taishō) is an annual award which began in 1989 and is sponsored by the Yomiuri Shimbun and Shimizu Corporation with the backing of publisher Shinchōsha. The winner gets a contract to have their unpublished work published by Shinchōsha and receives ¥5 million. The contest is open to anyone, whether an already published author or not. Past winners include Riku Onda, Fuyumi Ono and Ken'ichi Sakemi. Kōji Suzuki, known for his Ring series, was later one of the selectors for this award, although he did not win the grand prize. It ceased being awarded after 2013, its twenty-fifth year, but started again in 2017.

== Selection committee ==
=== Historical: 1-7 ===
- Mitsumasa Anno
- Hiroshi Aramata
- Hisashi Inoue
- Genichirō Takahashi
- Sumiko Yagawa

=== Historical: 8-10 ===
- Mitsumasa Anno
- Hiroshi Aramata
- Hisashi Inoue
- Makoto Shiina
- Sumiko Yagawa

=== Historical: 11-13 ===
- Hiroshi Aramata
- Hisashi Inoue
- Makoto Shiina
- Kōji Suzuki
- Sumiko Yagawa

=== Historical: 14-22 ===
- Hiroshi Aramata
- Hisashi Inoue
- Mari Kotani
- Makoto Shiina
- Kōji Suzuki

=== Historical: 23-25 ===
- Hiroshi Aramata
- Moto Hagio
- Mari Kotani
- Makoto Shiina
- Kōji Suzuki

=== Historical: 2017-2020 ===
- Moto Hagio
- Tomihiko Morimi
- Riku Onda

=== Historical: 2021-2023 ===
- Tomihiko Morimi
- Riku Onda
- Mari Yamazaki

== List of winners ==
=== Year 1: 1989 ===
- Grand Prize: Kōkyū Shōsetsu by Ken'ichi Sakemi
- Superior Award: Uchū no Minamoto no Taki by Izumi Yamaguchi
- Runners Up:
  - Tsuki no Shizuku 100% Juice by Hiroaki Okazaki
  - Cosmic Beetle by Takao Iwamoto
  - Mikazuki Ginjirō ga Iku: Īhatōbo no Bōkenhen by Tatsuhiko Takeyoshi

=== Year 2: 1990 ===
- Grand Prize: none
- Superior Award:
  - Rakuen by Kōji Suzuki, English translation: Paradise (Vertical. 2006)
  - Eiyū Rafashiden by Hiroaki Okazaki
- Runners Up:
  - Last Magic by Tetsuya Murakami
  - Nichirin'ō Densetsu by Ayame Hara
  - Nenjutsu Kozō by Masakazu Katō

=== Year 3: 1991 ===
- Grand Prize: Balthasar no Henreki by Aki Satō
- Superior Award: Nanka Tōkaitakushi by Gakuto Hara
- Runners Up:
  - Refrain by Rin Sawamura
  - Tenmei Dōji by Yasuko Kawai
  - Rokubanmei no Sayoko by Riku Onda

=== Year 4: 1992 ===
- Grand Prize: none
- Superior Award: Mukashi, Kasei no Atta Basho by Yūsaku Kitano
- Runners Up:
  - Fantasia by Kyō Fujiwara
  - Aoi Eriru no Hana by Satoshi Utsugi
  - Yasha ga Ike Densetsu Ibun by Komoriten
  - Gāda no Hoshi by Satoko Tatsuki

=== Year 5: 1993 ===
- Grand Prize: Irahai by Tetsuya Satō
- Superior Award: Shusen by Takenori Nanjō
- Runners Up:
  - Tōkei Ibun by Fuyumi Ono
  - Kyūkei no Kisetsu by Riku Onda

=== Year 6: 1994 ===
- Grand Prize:
  - Bagājimanupanasu by Eiichi Ikegami
  - Tettō Musashinosen by Minoru Ginbayashi
- Superior Award: none
- Runners Up:
  - Mujika Makīna by Fumio Takano
  - Sekai no Hate ni Umarete by Rin Sawamura
  - Tobichi no Jimu by Min Ishidate

=== Year 7: 1995 ===
- Grand Prize: none
- Superior Award:
  - Funtai by Masaya Fujita
  - Bus Stop no Shōsoku by Tatsushi Shimamoto
- Runners Up:
  - Yōsorō 1983 by Tetsuya Ueno
  - Gakidō Sugoroku Soba Itohiki by Noboru Kihara

=== Year 8: 1996 ===
- Grand Prize: none
- Superior Award:
  - Island by Ken Hazuki
  - Aonekoya by Mitsuko Kido
- Runners Up:
  - Dabusuton Kaidō by Mitsufumi Asagure
  - Kaiyū Opera Fune kara no Dasshutsu by Shunichi Hashimoto
  - Uchū Bōeigun by Masayuki Yagi

=== Year 9: 1997 ===
- Grand Prize: Baisuboiru Book by Kyōichi Imura
- Superior Award: Kyōsō Kaiiki by Shigeru Satō
- Runners Up:
  - Gonin Kazoku by Rin Sawamura
  - Junkai no Senritsu by Ryōji Yokoyama
  - Nendaiki "Anoekumene Mercury" by Fumiko Hagiwara

=== Year 10: 1998 ===
- Grand Prize: Organist by Yō Yamanoguchi
- Superior Award:
  - Yan no Ita Shima by Rin Sawamura
  - Aoneko no Machi by Yūichi Suzumoto
- Runners Up:
  - Gizō Shuki by Toshiro Kuwabara

=== Year 11: 1999 ===
- Grand Prize: Nobunaga Aruiha Taikanseru Androgynous by Haruaki Utsukibara
- Superior Award: BH85 by Mori Seika
- Runners Up:
  - Crystal Memory by Tomomichi Nishiogi
  - Jacob no Hashigo wo Kudari Kitaru Mono by Aoi Hitomi

=== Year 12: 2000 ===
- Grand Prize: none
- Superior Award: Kasō no Kishi by Naoko Saitō
- Runners Up:
  - Namida Hime by Michimichi Okuno
  - Koiwarai by Yui Matsunomiya a.k.a. Hiroshi Matsumiya
  - Bachigaina Kōgeihin by Matsui Ōhama

=== Year 13: 2001 ===
- Grand Prize: Taiyō to Shisha no Kiroku by Chise Kasuya
- Superior Award: Shabake by Megumi Hatakenaka
- Runners Up:
  - Undead Returners by Jin Satō
  - Apāto to Oni to Kisekae Ningyō by Osamu Koshigaya

=== Year 14: 2002 ===
- Grand Prize: Short Stories a.k.a. Sekai no Hate no Niwa: Short Stories by Ken Nishizaki
- Superior Award: Kai by Ayumi Oyama
- Runners Up:
  - Kigeki no Naka no Kigeki: Minami no Kuni no Shakespeare by Keiichi Izumi
  - Amanouzume no Yūutsu by Humika Nakajima

=== Year 15: 2003 ===
- Grand Prize: Taiyō no Tou / Pyrenees no Shiro a.k.a. Taiyō no Tou by Tomihiko Morimi
- Superior Award: Zou no Sumu Machi by Kyū Watanabe
- Runners Up:
  - Rabbit Shinpan by Jun Kanooka
  - Kagemai by Noriaki Oda

=== Year 16: 2004 ===
- Grand Prize: Rasu Manchasu Tūshin by Hirayama Mizuho
- Superior Award: Bonus Track by Osamu Koshigaya
- Runners Up:
  - Kono Hareta Hi ni, Hitori de by Katsuhiro Harada
  - Ikejiri Water Court by Michiko Horii

=== Year 17: 2005 ===
- Grand Prize: Konharuya Gomez by Naka Saijō
- Superior Award: none
- Runners Up:
  - Tenjō no Niwa, Hikari no Jikoku by Natsuki Mizumachi
  - Kohaku Wacchi by Kazu Saiki

=== Year 18: 2006 ===
- Grand Prize: Boku Boku Sensei by Hideyuki Niki
- Superior Award: Yami Kagami by Asako Horikawa
- Runners Up:
  - Cappadocia Wine by Kazuho Ōhara
  - Yoru no Unicorn by Tetsuya Matsuda

=== Year 19: 2007 ===
- Grand Prize: Enken Den by Hideaki Hironari
- Superior Award: Brack Jack Kid by Takehiko Kubodera
- Runners Up:
  - Karakuri Neko to Jikan Ryokō Dairiten by Kiri Wada
  - Kikkō Ki by Masayuki Fujita

=== Year 20: 2008 ===
- Grand Prize: Tenkai no Miyako: Aru Kenchikuka wo Meguru Monogatari a.k.a. Tenshi no Horō: Aru Kenchikuka wo Meguru Monogatari by Gen Nakamura
- Superior Award: Kanojo no Shiranai Kanojo by Ran Satomi
- Runners Up:
  - Ryūmori no Matsuei by Haruka Mayama
  - Ideal by Yū Matsuzaki a.k.a. Yūri Matsuzaki

=== Year 21: 2009 ===
- Grand Prize: Gettōya by Junko Tōda / Zōdaiha ni Tsugu by Masakuni Oda
- Superior Award: none
- Runners Up:
  - Kuzira ga Tobu Yoru by Minato Yamada
  - Shishōsetsu by Sen Satō
  - Kachō Ryōran by Uro Jinno

=== Year 22: 2010 ===
- Grand Prize: Wadatsumi no Chinkonka a.k.a. Zenya no Kōseki by Kiri Shino
- Superior Award: Shizuka no Umi a.k.a. Tsuki no Sanagi by Akira Ishino
- Runners Up:
  - Gehō Koji KA.SIN by Kazumi Kamimori
  - Hall Shovel: Aru Anahori no Monogatari by Susumu Asari

=== Year 23: 2011 ===
- Grand Prize: Sazanami no Kuni by Umiyuri Katsuyama
- Superior Award: Yoshida Kigurumare Night by Shuntarō Hino
- Runners Up:
  - Zanzō no Tobira by Kō Aomi
  - Nigemachi Fenuse by Nio Takano

=== Year 24: 2012 ===
- Grand Prize: none
- Superior Award: Asa no Yōka by Aoba Mikuni / Worker by Shunsuke Seki
- Runners Up:
  - Kyōryū Gift by Ayako Inoue
  - Ongoku by Mika Harima

=== Year 25: 2013 ===
- Grand Prize: Kotoshi no Okurimono a.k.a. Hoshi no Tami no Christmas by Natsuki Koyata
- Superior Award: Kinoko Mura no Onna Eiyū a.k.a. Wasure Mura no Yen to Shinkai no Inu by Shin Suzuki a.k.a. Shin Saezaki
- Runners Up:
  - Akashic Museum by Kiyomi Amahara
  - Akutō Kaden by Aoi Sakamoto
