= Gen'ichirō =

- Gender: Male

Origin
- Origin: Japanese
- Meaning: Different meanings depending on the kanji used

Gen'ichirō, Genichirō, Genichiro or Genichirou (written: 源一郎 or 玄一郎) is a masculine Japanese given name. Notable people with the name include:

- Fukuchi Gen'ichirō (福地 源一郎; 1841–1906), Japanese writer
- Genichiro Sata (佐田 玄一郎; born 1952), Japanese politician
- Gen'ichirō Sunouchi (洲之内 源一郎; 1911–2008), Japanese mathematician
- Genichiro Takahashi (高橋 源一郎; born 1951), Japanese writer
- Genichiro Tenryu (天龍 源一郎; born 1950), Japanese professional wrestler

== Fictional characters ==
- Genichiro Ashina (葦名 弦一郎), a main antagonist of the video game Sekiro: Shadows Die Twice
- Genichiro Sanada (真田 弦一郎), a character in the manga series The Prince of Tennis
