= Sunouchi =

Sunouchi (written: 簾内 or 洲之内) is a Japanese surname. Notable people with the surname include:

- Gen'ichirō Sunouchi (洲之内 源一郎, 1911–2008), Japanese mathematician
- Nozomi Sunouchi (簾内 望, born 1965), Japanese swimmer
