= Somehow, Crystal =

Japanese novel by Yasuo Tanaka

- Cover of first Japanese edition
- Author: Yasuo Tanaka
- Original title: なんとなく、クリスタル (Nantonaku, Kurisutaru)
- Translator: Christopher Smith
- Language: Japanese
- Genre: Postmodern literature
- Publisher: Kawade Shobō Shinsha, Kurodahan Press
- Publication date: 1981
- Publication place: Japan
- English publication date: 2019
- Media type: Print
- Pages: 191
- Awards: Bungei Prize
- ISBN: 9784909473059

Somehow, Crystal (なんとなく、クリスタル, Nantonaku, Kurisutaru) is a Japanese novel by Yasuo Tanaka. Published in magazine form as the winner of the 17th Bungei Prize in 1980, it was also nominated for the Akutagawa Prize, and published in book form by Kawade Shobō Shinsha in 1981. A bestseller shortly after publication, the novel was controversial among contemporary critics for its apparent glorification of luxury consumption and its use of extensive annotations to identify desirable real-world products, brands, services, and locations encountered by the book's fictional characters. Academic critics have since identified Somehow, Crystal as an early and important example of Japanese postmodern literature. The book has been translated into Korean, German, and English, and a Japanese film adaptation was released by Shochiku in 1981.

== Plot summary ==
While her boyfriend Jun'ichi is out of town, college student and part-time model Yuri passes the time in Tokyo by shopping for luxury products, visiting affluent neighborhoods, eating expensive food, and seeking new kinds of entertainment. At a dance club she meets Masataka, to whom she describes her relatively frictionless life as "crystal". Yuri has a sexual encounter with Masataka that she enjoys but finds less satisfying than her experiences with Jun'ichi. When Jun'ichi returns, Yuri learns that he also was unfaithful during his trip, but she reflects on her financial independence and decides that staying with Jun'ichi is the best fit for her crystal lifestyle.

== Major themes ==
Scholars and critics have focused on the role of the annotations in Somehow, Crystal, largely dismissing the main narrative thread as "thin on plot", "plotless", having a "thin plot", having a plot that "verges on nonexistence", and providing "mere scaffolding" for the notes. The published book contains 442 notes, most of which explain, and opine about, brands, music, places, and trends that the characters encounter, leading literary scholar Faye Yuan Kleeman to describe the book as a "thinly disguised product and lifestyle endorsement narrative". The anthropologist Fabio Gygi has summarized Somehow, Crystal as a "catalogue novel".

For some critics and scholars, the notes seemed to promote consumerism. Contemporary critic Takashi Tsumura attributed the popularity of the book not to any literary merits, but to its particular appeal to young consumers. Noting the detail with which a single paragraph contains notes for shops like Kinokuniya, neighborhoods like Daikanyama and Hiroo, and places to eat such as Chez Lui and Lecomte, literary scholar Marc Yamada observed that the notes divert attention away from the main text, instead "focusing the reader's desire on consumer products". Comparing the book to a series of television commercials, literary scholar Masao Miyoshi wrote that Somehow, Crystal "tries to look ironic and sophisticated, but barely manages to conceal its crude apologia for affluence".

Literary scholars writing well after the publication of the book have focused on the intertextuality of the narrative and annotations. Drawing on the writings of Hiroki Azuma about postmodernism as a shift away from narrative and toward hypertext and database as cultural forms, Marc Yamada highlights the relationship between main text and annotations as a "database of cultural information that the reader is required to synthesize", thereby decentering the possibility of a single author. For literary scholar Norma Field, the notes, which in the book are written in a completely different style to the main text, reflect a dominant, masculine authorial voice that she describes as a "voyeuristic presence" watching and responding to the main female character. Christopher Smith, a literary scholar and translator of Tanaka's work, instead interprets the main text and notes as expressions of two aspects of Yuri's identity, which she manipulates in order to navigate different social situations and relationships.

== Publication and reception ==
=== Initial publication ===
Seeking to write a novel that engaged the immediate material concerns of his own generation, Yasuo Tanaka wrote Somehow, Crystal while attending Hitotsubashi University. He has said that his use of annotations was inspired by Ambrose Bierce's satirical work The Devil's Dictionary. In 1980 the story won a Bungei Prize with the support of literary critic Jun Etō, who praised the novel's "freshness" and formal innovation. It was published alongside other Bungei Prize winners in the December 1980 issue of Bungei. The awarding of the Bungei prize to Somehow, Crystal was highly controversial, with critics focusing on its lack of conventional narrative development and apparent endorsement of consumer culture. Although the story was also nominated for the Akutagawa Prize, the novel received what Norma Field has called "virtually complete critical dismissal".

The following year Kawade Shobō Shinsha published Somehow, Crystal in book format. In contrast to the version previously printed in Bungei, the book expanded the number of footnotes to 442, changed the writing style in the footnotes from plain form to polite form, and added final notes reporting statistics on population decline in Japan. The book sold over 800,000 copies in its initial release, and eventually sold over a million copies. Historian Eiko Maruko Siniawer has observed that the book was a phenomenon of public culture, in which it was often cited as an example of Japanese consumerism, but also provided a useful guide for young people who were interested in pursuing the lifestyle portrayed in the story. The term "kurisutaru zoku" (lit. "crystal tribe") came into popular use to describe these young consumers, and companies began using the word "crystal" to promote their products.

=== Reassessment and updates ===
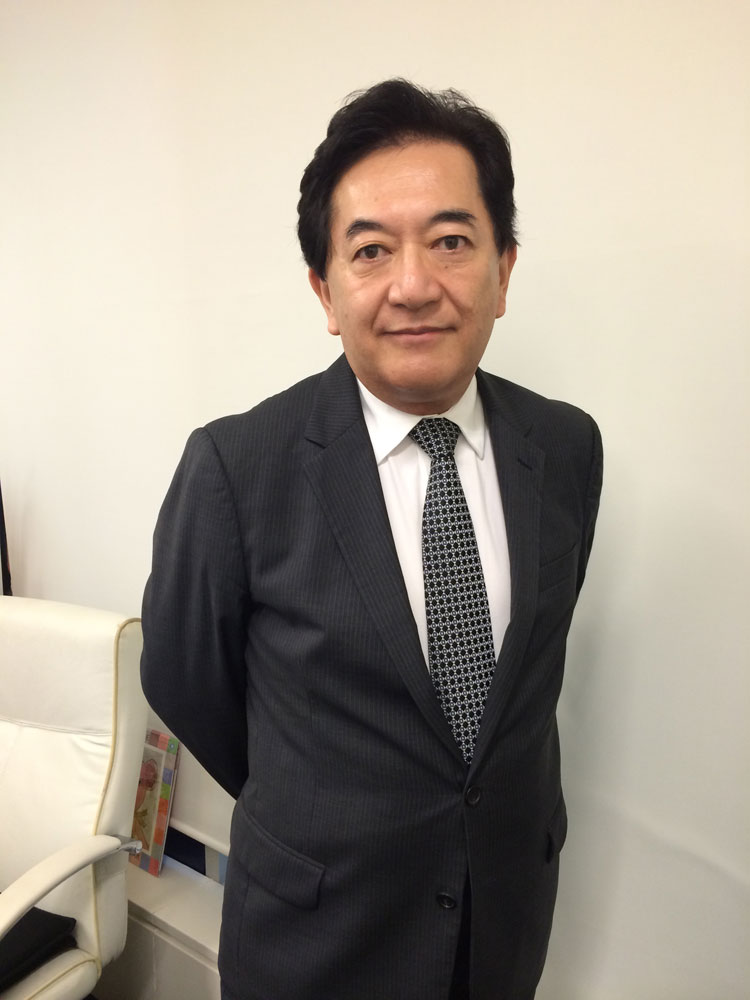
Somehow, Crystal and Somehow, Crystal, 33 Years Later author Yasuo Tanaka in 2014

In the decades following the publication of Somehow, Crystal, scholars and critics have, for different reasons, identified the book as an important work of postmodern Japanese literature. Literary scholar Matthew Strecher identifies the book's publication as the starting point of a postmodern literary trend that "resists the concepts and definitions" of traditional Japanese literature, comparing it to the early work of Haruki Murakami. Marc Yamada classifies Somehow, Crystal as an early example of postmodern "database fiction" that reflected the influence of new technology and information structures on Japanese literature. In Masao Miyoshi's reading, Somehow, Crystal is the "most typical" example of postmodern Japanese novels that, through the "disintegration of narrative art", also remove the possibility of cultural resistance to commercial dominance. From a different theoretical perspective, Norma Field calls the novel the "exemplary phenomenon of the decade in Japan", and suggests that the novel's narrative and notes together create a postmodern "atmosphere" from within which opposition to the "logic of cultural capitalism" cannot be mounted.

In 2014, Kawade Shobō Shinsha published Tanaka's sequel to Somehow, Crystal under the title Somehow, Crystal, 33 Years Later (33年後のなんとなく、クリスタル, 33 Nengo no Nantonaku, Kurisutaru). Written in the first person, the sequel takes the perspective of a married politician who meets up with ex-girlfriends, discusses the state of Japanese politics and society, and catches up with Yuri, the main character from the first novel, who has become a 54-year old businessperson working in public relations. Like the original novel, the sequel incorporates many notes, including updated statistics on the declining birth rate and overall aging of the Japanese population. In a 2021 essay for Bungei Shunjū, Tanaka reflected that people largely had not responded to the concerns about population trends he expressed in the notes of Somehow, Crystal, and acknowledged that his original prediction that fertility rates could turn around had not been borne out in practice.

=== Translations ===
Shortly after the book's release in Japan, multiple unauthorized Korean translations were published in South Korea. A German translation, titled Kristall Kids, was published by Krüger in 1987. In 2019, an English translation by Christopher Smith was published by Kurodahan Press under the title Somehow, Crystal.

== Film adaptation ==
The novel was adapted into a 1981 Shochiku film titled Nantonaku, Kurisutaru, starring Kazuko Katō as Yuri, Toshio Kamei as Jun'ichi, and Zenzō Shimizu as Masataka. The promotional poster for the film prominently featured a listing of the foreign songs on the soundtrack, including "I Go Crazy" by Paul Davis, "We're All Alone" by Boz Scaggs, and "99" by Toto. Writing for Variety, pseudonymous reviewer Bail noted that for all of the superficial trendiness of the film's characters and settings, Nantonaku, Kurisutaru showed how young Japanese people and their desires differed from previous generations, concluding that the film was "unimportant as art, but nevertheless an important social document".

== Works cited ==
- Bail (October 13, 1982). "Nantonaku, Kurisutaru (Somehow, Crystal)". Variety. Vol. 308, no. 11. p. 20.
- Field, Norma (1989). "Somehow: The Postmodern as Atmosphere". In Miyoshi, Masao; Harootunian, Harry (eds.). Postmodernism and Japan. Duke University Press. pp. 169–188. doi:10.1215/9780822381556-010. ISBN 9780822381556. S2CID 191772294.
- Gygi, Fabio (2017). "The Metamorphosis of Excess: 'Rubbish Houses' and the Imagined Trajectory of Things in Post-Bubble Japan". In Cwiertka, Katarzyna; Machotka, Ewa (eds.). Consuming Life in Post-Bubble Japan: A Transdisciplinary Perspective. Amsterdam University Press. pp. 129–151. ISBN 9789462980631.
- Kleeman, Faye Yuan (2018). "Intertwining Tongues: Bilingualism and Hybrid Tests in Contemporary Japanese Literature". Border Crossings: The Journal of Japanese-Language Literature Studies. 6 (1): 21–32. doi:10.22628/bcjjl.2018.6.1.21. S2CID 165946251.
- Miyoshi, Masao (1989). "Against the Native Grain: The Japanese Novel and the "Postmodern" West". In Miyoshi, Masao; Harootunian, Harry (eds.). Postmodernism and Japan. Duke University Press. pp. 143–168. doi:10.1215/9780822381556-009. ISBN 9780822381556. S2CID 131813759.
- Ota, Satoshi (2015). "The witches of Tokyo: An investigation in the bimajyo trend". East Asian Journal of Popular Culture. 1 (3): 255–270. doi:10.1386/eapc.1.2.255_1.
- Perkins, Chris (2022). "Murakami's Strange Library". In Crawford, Alice; Crawford, Robert (eds.). Libraries in Literature. Oxford University Press. pp. 220–232. doi:10.1093/oso/9780192855732.003.0015. ISBN 978-0192855732.
- Shimizu, Yoshinori (December 15, 2014). "33年後のなんとなく、クリスタル 田中康夫著" [Somehow, Crystal, 33 Years Later by Yasuo Tanaka]. The Nikkei (in Japanese).
- Siniawer, Eiko Maruko (2018). Waste: Consuming Postwar Japan. Cornell University Press. ISBN 9781501725845.
- Smith, Christopher (2020). "Somehow, Dialogic: The Dialogic Self and the Rejection of the Modern in Nantonaku, kurisutaru". The Journal of Japanese Studies. 46 (2): 369–393. doi:10.1353/jjs.2020.0045. S2CID 226416647.
- Stalker, Nancy (2018). ""Cool" Japan as Cultural Superpower (1980s–2010s)". Japan: History and Culture from Classical to Cool. University of California Press. pp. 362–400. doi:10.1525/9780520962835-013. ISBN 9780520962835. S2CID 226729835.
- Strecher, Matthew (1998). "Beyond "Pure" Literature: Mimesis, Formula, and the Postmodern in the Fiction of Murakami Haruki". The Journal of Asian Studies. 57 (2): 354–378. doi:10.2307/2658828. JSTOR 2658828. S2CID 162268985.
- Tanaka, Yasuo (December 1, 1980). "なんとなく、クリスタル". 文藝 (in Japanese). Vol. 19, no. 12. pp. 30–82.
- Tanaka, Yasuo (1981). なんとなく、クリスタル [Somehow, Crystal] (in Japanese). Kawade Shobō Shinsha. OCLC 1015066323.
- Tanaka, Yasuo (1987). Kristall Kids [Crystal Kids] (in German). Krüger. ISBN 9783810520050.
- Tanaka, Yasuo (2014). 33年後のなんとなく、クリスタル [Somehow, Crystal 33 Years Later] (in Japanese). Kawade Shobō Shinsha. ISBN 9784309023342. OCLC 899264536.
- Tanaka, Yasuo (2019). Somehow, Crystal. Translated by Smith, Christopher. Kurodahan Press. ISBN 9784909473059.
- Tanaka, Yasuo (January 20, 2021). "田中康夫『なんとなく、クリスタル』発表から40年…的中した"一抹の不安"とは" [40 years on from the release of Somehow, Crystal, what is the uneasy feeling that proved correct?]. Bunshun Online.
- Tsunoda, Waka (1988). "The Influx of English in Japanese Language and Literature". World Literature Today. 62 (3): 425–430. doi:10.2307/40144293. JSTOR 40144293.
- Yamada, Marc (2013). "The Database Imagination of Japanese Postmodern Culture". Japanese Studies. 33 (1): 19–37. doi:10.1080/10371397.2013.770452. S2CID 143665430.
- "なんとなく、クリスタル". Shochiku. n.d. Archived from the original on October 25, 2022.
