= Akira Kuroda =

Japanese novelist

- Born: 1977 (age 48–49); Chiba Prefecture, Japan
- Occupations: novelist and critic

Akira Kuroda (黒田 晶, Kuroda Akira), born 1977, is a Japanese novelist.

She was born in Chiba Prefecture and studied Art at Meiji Gakuin University before dropping out and going on to study at the University of Brighton. In 2000 she won the 37th Bungei Prize for her novel, You Love Us, though the title has since been changed to Made in Japan. In 2003 she was nominated for the 16th Yukio Mishima Prize for her novel, Sekai ga Hajimaru Asa.

== Publications ==
- You Love Us (2000), also known as Made in Japan
- Sekai ga Hajimaru Asa (2003)
