= Natsuki Koyata =

Japanese writer

- 古谷田 奈月
- Born: 1981 (age 44–45); Abiko, Chiba, Japan
- Education: Nishogakusha University
- Occupation: Writer
- Writing career
- Language: Japanese
- Genre: Fiction
- Notable works: Hoshi no tami no kurisumasu; Release; Mugen no gen
- Notable awards: Japan Fantasy Novel Award; Mishima Yukio Prize; Oda Sakunosuke Prize

Natsuki Koyata (古谷田 奈月, Koyata Natsuki; born 1981) is a Japanese writer. She has won the Mishima Yukio Prize, the Japan Fantasy Novel Award, and the Oda Sakunosuke Prize.

== Early life and education ==
Koyata was born in Abiko, Chiba, Japan in 1981. In junior high school she initially participated in the softball club, then quit group activities and refused to go to school, instead spending time reading at the local library. Koyata later returned to school and eventually graduated from Nishogakusha University in Tokyo. After graduation she worked in temporary jobs and began writing her first novel.

== Career ==
Koyata made her literary debut with Kotoshi no okurimono (今年の贈り物), a Christmas fantasy story that was published as a book in 2013 under the title Hoshi no tami no kurisumasu (星の民のクリスマス) and won that year's Japan Fantasy Novel Award. The novel Jun no tame no 6-tsu no shōkyoku (ジュンのための 6つの小曲) followed the next year.

In 2016 Koyata's book Release (リリース, Rirīsu), a story about sexuality and discrimination set in a near future society, won the 34th Oda Sakunosuke Prize. Release was also nominated for the 30th Mishima Yukio Prize, but the prize went to Yusuke Miyauchi. The next year she was nominated again and won the 31st Mishima Yukio Prize for Mugen no gen (無限の玄). That same year Koyata's book Nozomu no wa (望むのは), a story about relationships and sexuality in the life of a fifteen year old girl set in a fantasy society in which animals and people are family, was published by Shinchosha. Nozomu no wa won the 17th Sense of Gender Awards Grand Prize.

In 2018 Mugen no gen was published in a book along with the story Kazashimo no shu (風下の朱), which was nominated for the 159th Akutagawa Prize.

== Recognition ==
- 2013 Japan Fantasy Novel Award
- 2017 34th Oda Sakunosuke Prize
- 2018 31st Mishima Yukio Prize
- 2018 17th Sense of Gender Awards Grand Prize

== Bibliography ==
- Hoshi no tami no kurisumasu (星の民のクリスマス), Shinchosha, 2013, ISBN 9784103349112
- Jun no tame no 6-tsu no shōkyoku (ジュンのための 6つの小曲), Shinchosha, 2014, ISBN 9784103349129
- Release (リリース, Rirīsu), Kobunsha, 2016, ISBN 9784334911287
- Nozomu no wa (望むのは), Shinchosha, 2017, ISBN 9784103349136
- Mugen no gen : kazashimo no aka (無限の玄: 風下の朱), Chikuma Shobō, 2018, ISBN 9784480804808
- Shinzensuikyōen (神前酔狂宴), Kawade Shobō, 2019, ISBN 9784309028088
