= Rieko Matsuura =

Japanese novelist and short story writer (born 1958)

Rieko Matsuura 松浦 理英子
- Born: August 7, 1958 (age 68); Matsuyama, Ehime, Japan
- Citizenship: Japanese
- Education: Aoyama Gakuin University
- Occupations: Novelist, Short story writer
- Writing career
- Notable work: Apprenticeship of Big Toe P

Rieko Matsuura (松浦 理英子, Matsuura Rieko; born August 15, 1958) is a Japanese novelist and short story writer. She is a recipient of the Yomiuri Prize.

== History ==
Matsuura was born in Matsuyama, Ehime Prefecture in Japan. Her middle school years were passed in Marugame, Kagawa Prefecture.

She went from Marugame West Middle School to Kagawa Prefecture Otemae Middle School, a private school in the area. Matsuura attended Aoyama Gakuin University where she majored in French literature. In her teens, she had read Marquis de Sade and Jean Genet, and she wished to be in the French literature department so she could read their works in the original language. In 1978, while enrolled at school, she won the Bungakukai New Writers Award (文學界新人賞) award for writing "The Day of the Funeral", her first book. In 1987, her book Natural Woman was given a rave review by Kenji Nakagami, bringing attention to her. In 1994, her book Apprenticeship of Big Toe P, about the travels of a woman whose big toe on her right foot turns into a penis, won the Women Writers' Prize and was nominated for the Mishima Yukio Prize. Additionally, the book became a best-seller. She co-wrote the script for the Natural Woman movie, which was also released in 1994.

Seven years passed between Apprenticeship of Big Toe P and Opposite Version, and another seven until Kenshin was published. The latter book, published in 2007, won the Yomiuri Prize in 2008. She is currently a committee member for the Shinchō New Writers Award.

== Bibliography ==
- The Day of the Funeral (葬儀の日) (1980)
- Sebastian (セバスチャン) (1981)
- Natural Woman (ナチュラル・ウーマン) (1987)
- Apprenticeship of Big Toe P (親指Pの修業時代, Big Toe P's Training Period) (1993); English translation by Michael Emmerich (Kodansha, 2010)
- Pocket Fetish (ポケット・フェティッシュ) (essay) (1994)
- For a Gentle Castration (優しい去勢のために) (essay) (1994); English translation by Amanda Seaman in Woman Critiqued, ed. Rebecca Copeland (University of Hawai'i Press, 2006)
- Drowning Counseling Service (おぼれる人生相談) (1998)
- Opposite Version (裏ヴァージョン) (2007)
- Kenshin (犬身) (2007)
