= Fumio Takano =

Japanese writer

- 高野 史緒
- Born: 1966; Ibaraki Prefecture, Japan
- Education: Ibaraki University; Ochanomizu University
- Occupation: Writer
- Writing career
- Notable works: Swan Knight; Graf Zeppelin; Musica Machina; The Sister Karamazov
- Notable awards: Seiun Award; Edogawa Rampo Prize; Japan Fantasy Novel Award Finalist

Fumio Takano (高野 史緒, Takano Fumio) is a Japanese writer from Ibaraki Prefecture. Her work has won the 58th Edogawa Rampo Prize and she was a finalist for the 6th Japan Fantasy Novel Award. She won the 55th Seiun Award for Best Japanese Long Work for her novel Graf Zeppelin: The Airship of That Summer, which was also a finalist for the Nihon SF Taisho Award.

== Selected works ==
=== Selected Books in Japanese ===
- Mujika Makīna (Musica Machina), Shinchosha, 1995, ISBN 9784104059010; Hayakawa, 2002, ISBN 9784150306939
- Kanto Anjeriko (Canto Angelico), Kodansha, 1996, ISBN 9784062083270
- Karamāzofu no imōto (The Sister Karamazov), Kodansha, 2012, ISBN 9784062178501

=== Selected works in English translation ===
- Swan Knight, trans. Sharni Wilson, 2024, Luna Press Publishing
- "Lest You Remember", trans. Jim Hubbert, Speculative Japan 3, 2011, Kurodahan Press
- "Anton and Kiyohime", trans. Hart Larrabee, Tomo: Friendship Through Fiction, 2010, edited by Holly Thompson, Stone Bridge Press
- "Barcarolle", trans. Sharni Wilson, AI x SF, 2019, review by Sara L. Uckelman
- "The Secret", trans. Sharni Wilson, khōréō, 2025, edited by Zhui Ning Chang, review by A.C. Wise
