= Fuminori Nakamura =

Japanese writer

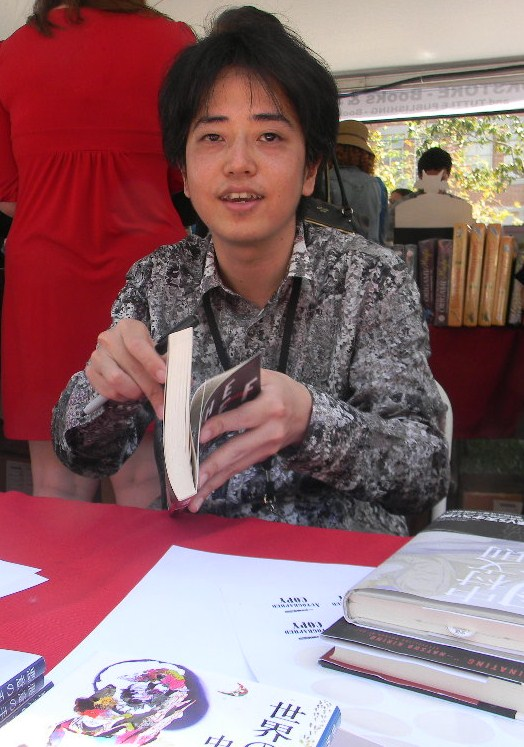
- Nakamura in 2013
- Born: September 2, 1977 (age 48)
- Occupation: Novelist
- Writing career
- Period: 2002–present
- Notable work: The Thief
- Notable awards: Akutagawa Prize; 2005; Ōe Kenzaburō Prize; 2010
- Website: nakamurafuminori.jp

Fuminori Nakamura (中村 文則, Nakamura Fuminori; born 2 September 1977) is the pseudonym of a Japanese author. Nakamura came to international attention when he won the 2010 Kenzaburō Ōe Prize for his novel, The Thief (掏摸, "Pickpocket"). The English translation of the novel was well received.

== Biography ==
Nakamura grew up in Aichi Prefecture and graduated in 2000 with a degree in public administration from Fukushima University. He now lives in Tokyo.

Nakamura has already published two dozen books in Japan. His works have been translated into numerous languages and have been published in the United States, Great Britain, China, France and Spain, among others. Nakamura cites Franz Kafka and Fyodor Dostoyevsky as literary influences.

In 2002 he received the Shinchō Young Writer Prize for his debut novel The Gun (銃 Jū). In 2004 he was awarded the Noma Prize for Shakō, and the following year he received the Akutagawa Prize for The Boy in the Earth (土の中の子供 Tsuchi no naka no kodomo). In 2010 Nakamura received the Kenzaburō Ōe Prize for the novel The Thief (掏摸 Suri).

In 2018, The Gun was adapted as a feature film, screenwritten and directed by Masaharu Take.

The Wall Street Journal called The Thief a "chilling philosophical thriller" and included it in its Best Fiction of 2012, while Time Out Chicago called the novel a "breath of fresh air." The novel was also a finalist for the 2012 Los Angeles Times Book Prize in the Best Mystery/Thriller category.

The book, though marketed as crime fiction, was cited by some reviewers as being a work of literary fiction.

== Bibliography ==
=== Novels ===
- Jū (銃), 2003
  - The Gun, trans. Allison Markin Powell (Soho Press, 2016)
- Shakō (遮光) [Shield Me from the Light], 2004
- Akui no Shuki (悪意の手記) [A Note of Malice], 2005
- Tsuchi no naka no kodomo (土の中の子ども), 2005
  - The Boy in the Earth, trans. Allison Markin Powell (Soho Crime, 2017)
- Saigo no Inochi (最後の命) [Final Life], 2007
- Nani mo ka mo Yūutsuna Yoru ni (何もかも憂鬱な夜に) [In the Night I Feel Everything Melancholy], 2009
- Suri (掏摸), 2009
  - The Thief, trans. Satoko Izumo and Stephen Coates (Soho Crime, 2012)
- Aku to Kamen no Rūru (悪と仮面のルール), 2010
  - Evil and the Mask, trans. Satoko Izumo and Stephen Coates (Soho Crime, 2013)
- Ōkoku (王国), 2011
  - The Kingdom, trans. Kalau Almony (Soho Press, 2016)
- Meikyū (迷宮) [The Labyrinth], 2012
- Kyonen no Fuyu, Kimi to Wakare (去年の冬、きみと別れ), 2013
  - Last Winter, We Parted, trans. Allison Markin Powell (Soho Press, 2014)
- Kyōdan X (教団X), 2014
  - Cult X, trans. Kalau Almony (Soho Press, 2018)
- Anata ga Kieta Yoru ni (あなたが消えた夜に) [On the Night You Disappeared], 2015
- Watashi no Shōmetsu (私の消滅), 2016
  - My Annihilation, trans. Sam Bett (Soho Crime, 2022)
- Aaru Teikoku (R帝国) [Empire R], 2017
- Sono-saki no michi ni kieru (その先の道に消える), 2018
  - The Rope Artist, trans. Sam Bett (Soho Crime, 2023)
- Kādo-shi (カード師) [Card master], 2021
- Retsu (列), [The Line] 2023

=== Short story collections ===
- Tsuchi no Naka no Kodomo (土の中の子供)[Child in the Ground], 2005
  - Tsuchi no Naka no Kodomo (土の中の子供), 2005
  - Kumo no Koe (蜘蛛の声)[The Voice of a Spider], 2004
- Sekai no Hate (世界の果て)[The Edge of the World], 2009
  - Tsuki no Shita no Kodomo (月の下の子供)[Child under the Moon], 2008
  - Gomi Yashiki (ゴミ屋敷)[The Garbage Room], 2008
  - Sensō-Biyori (戦争日和)[The Day worthy of the War], 2006
  - Yoru no Zawameki (夜のざわめき)[Noises in the Night], 2007
  - Sekai no Hate (世界の果て), 2006
- Madoi no Mori: 50 Stories (惑いの森～50ストーリーズ)[The Woods of a Delusion: 50 Stories], 2012
- A, 2014

== Awards and nominations ==
Japanese Awards

- 2002 – Shincho Prize for New Writers: Jū (The Gun)
- 2004 – Noma Literary Prize for New Writers: Shakō (Shield Me from the Light)
- 2005 – Akutagawa Prize: Tsuchi no Naka no Kodomo (Child in the Ground)
- 2010 – Ōe Kenzaburō Prize: Suri (The Thief)

U.S. Awards

- 2012 – Nominee for Los Angeles Times Book Prize for Mystery/thriller: The Thief
- 2014 – David Goodis Award
