= Nanae Aoyama =

Japanese writer

- 青山 七恵
- Born: January 20, 1983 (age 43); Saitama Prefecture, Japan
- Education: University of Tsukuba
- Occupation: Novelist
- Writing career
- Language: Japanese
- Years active: 2005-present
- Genre: Fiction
- Notable works: Mado no akari (窓の灯); Hitori biyori (ひとり日和); Kakera (かけら)
- Notable awards: Akutagawa Prize; Bungei Prize; Yasunari Kawabata Literary Prize

Nanae Aoyama (青山 七恵, Aoyama Nanae; born January 20, 1983) is a Japanese fiction writer. She has won the Akutagawa Prize, the Bungei Prize, and the Yasunari Kawabata Literary Prize. Her work has been translated into Chinese, Korean, Vietnamese, German, French, English, Italian and Polish.

== Early life and education ==
Aoyama was born in Saitama Prefecture, Japan. She graduated from the University of Tsukuba, where she studied library science.

== Career ==
After graduating from university, Aoyama moved to Tokyo to take a job at a travel firm. She began writing her first novel, Mado no akari, while working full-time. Mado no akari was published in 2005, and won the 42nd Bungei Prize. In 2007 Hitori biyori, Aoyama's story about freeters working part-time jobs, won the 136th Akutagawa Prize. After winning the Akutagawa Prize, Aoyama quit her office job to pursue writing full-time. In 2009 she won the Yasunari Kawabata Literary Prize for her short story Kakera, which was published in a collection of the same name. She was the youngest author ever to win the prize. Watashi no kareshi, Aoyama's first full-length novel, was published in 2011. In 2016 she collaborated with illustrator Satoe Tone on the children's book Watashi Otsuki-sama.

== Writing style ==
Aoyama has cited Françoise Sagan and Kazuo Ishiguro as literary influences. Literary scholar Judith Pascoe proposed that Wuthering Heights was a literary influence on Aoyama's work, particularly Meguri ito, and later confirmed this influence with Aoyama herself.

== Recognition ==
- 2005 42nd Bungei Prize
- 2007 136th Akutagawa Prize (2006下)
- 2009 Yasunari Kawabata Literary Prize

== Bibliography ==
=== Japanese ===
- Mado no akari (窓の灯, "The Light of Windows"), Kawade Shobō Shinsha, 2005, ISBN 9784309017372
- Hitori biyori (ひとり日和, "A Perfect Day to Be Alone"), Kawade Shobō Shinsha, 2007, ISBN 9784309018089
- Yasashii tameiki (やさしいため息, "A Gentle Sigh"), Kawade Shobō Shinsha, 2008, ISBN 9784309018621
- Kakera (かけら, "Fragments"), Shinchosha, 2009, ISBN 9784103181019
- Mahou tsukai kurabu (魔法使いクラブ, "Magic Users Club"), Gentosha, 2009, ISBN 9784344017528
- Owakare no oto (お別れの音, "The Sound of Separation"), Bungeishunjū, 2010 ISBN 9784163295800
- Watashi no kareshi (わたしの彼氏, "My Boyfriend"), Kodansha, 2011, ISBN 9784062168083
- Akari no kohan (あかりの湖畔, "The Lakeshore in the Light"), 2011, Chuokoron-Shinsha, 2011, ISBN 9784120043062
- Hanayome (花嫁, "The Bride"), Gentosha, 2012, ISBN 9784344021303
- Sumire (Sumire), Bungeishunjū, 2012, ISBN 9784163813608
- Meguri ito (めぐり糸), Shueisha, 2013, ISBN 9784087715439
- Kairaku (快楽, Pleasure), Kodansha, 2013, ISBN 9784062183390
- Kaze, Kawade Shobō Shinsha, 2014, ISBN 9784309022932
- Mayu, Shinchōsha, 2015, ISBN 9784103181026
- Watashi otsukisama, NHK, 2016 ISBN 9784140361252
- Hatchi to mārō, Shōgakukan, 2017, ISBN 9784093864688

=== English translation ===
- A Perfect Day to Be Alone, translated by Jesse Kirkwood, MacLehose Press, 2024
