= Nao-Cola Yamazaki =

Japanese writer (born 1978)

Nao-Cola Yamazaki 山崎 ナオコーラ
- 山崎 ナオコーラ
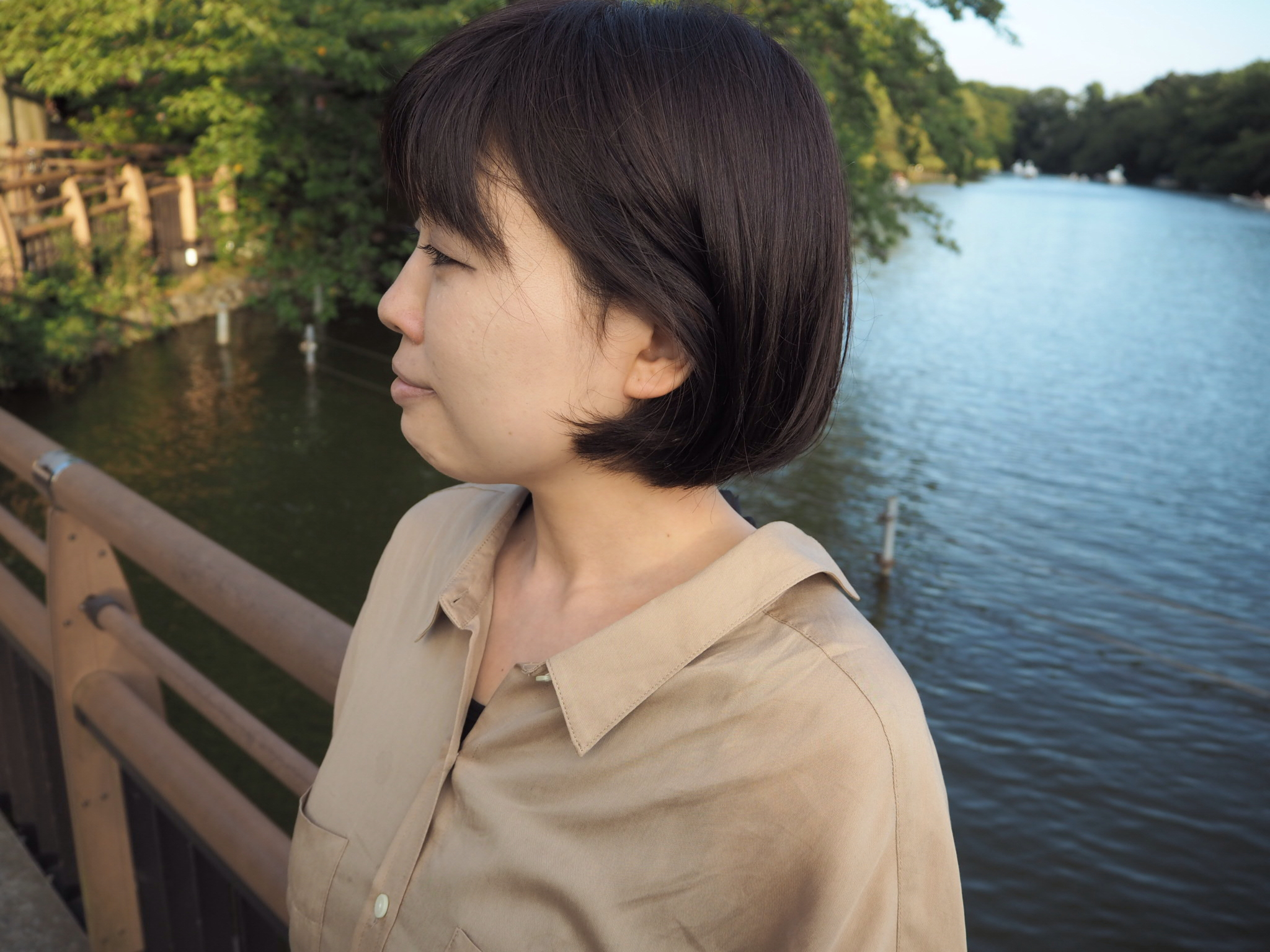
- Yamazaki in 2016
- Born: 山崎 直子; September 15, 1978 (age 47); Kitakyushu, Japan
- Education: Kokugakuin University
- Occupation: Writer
- Children: 2
- Writing career
- Language: Japanese
- Period: 2004–present
- Genres: Novel; essay
- Subjects: Diversity, Categories
- Notable works: Hito no sekkusu o warau na; Utsukushii kyori
- Notable awards: Bungei Prize; Shimase Award for Love Stories

Nao-Cola Yamazaki (山崎 ナオコーラ, Yamazaki Nao-Cola; born 1978) is the professional name of Naoko Yamazaki (山崎 直子, Yamazaki Naoko), a Japanese writer. Yamazaki claims to write "things no one else can say in words anyone can understand". Yamazaki's writing, however, won the Bungei Prize and the Shimase Award for Love Stories, being nominated multiple times for the Akutagawa Prize. Nao-Cola has suggested to use something like the gender-neutral singular "they", because being frustrated by the usage of "she" at the English Wikipedia.

== Early life and education ==
Yamazaki was born in 1978 in Kitakyushu, Japan. Shortly after, the family moved to Saitama Prefecture. Yamazaki started writing fiction as a senior at Kokugakuin University, graduating there with a thesis on the character Ukifune in The Tale of Genji. The pen name "Nao-Cola" is derived from Yamazaki's love of Diet Coke.

== Career ==
Yamazaki made a literary debut in 2004 with Hito no sekkusu o warau na (人のセックスを笑うな, Don't Laugh At Other People's Sex Lives), a story about a romantic relationship between a 19-year-old male student and his much older female teacher. Hito no sekkusu o warau na won the 41st Bungei Prize, an award recognizing new writers. The book was also nominated for the 132nd Akutagawa Prize. Hito no sekkusu o warau na was later adapted into the 2008 Nami Iguchi film of the same name, starring Hiromi Nagasaku and Kenichi Matsuyama.

Several of Yamazaki's subsequent novels were also nominated for the Akutagawa Prize. Katsura Biyōshitsu besshitsu (カツラ美容室別室), Yamazaki's 2007 novel about the relationships among people who meet at a beauty salon, was nominated for the 138th Akutagawa Prize and survived the first round of voting by the selection committee, but ultimately did not win, as the prize went to Mieko Kawakami. Yamazaki‘s story Te (手, Hand), later included in a 2009 collection of the same name, was nominated for the 140th Akutagawa Prize. Niki no kutsujoku (ニキの屈辱, Niki's Humiliation), a romance novel about the relationship between a popular photographer and a photographer's assistant, was nominated for the 145th Akutagawa Prize. In 2016 the novel Utsukushii kyori (美しい距離) was nominated for the 155th Akutagawa Prize, marking the fifth nomination for the award for Yamazaki, but the award went to first-time nominee Sayaka Murata. Utsukushii kyori, a story about a married couple dealing with the wife's terminal cancer, subsequently won the 23rd Shimase Award for Love Stories.

In addition to fiction, Yamazaki also publishes essays on non-traditional family life, including the 2016 collection Kawaii otto (かわいい夫, Cute Husband), a series of essays about living in a family where the wife is more successful than the husband. After having the first child at the age of 37, Yamazaki wrote a series of essays about the first year of the child's life. The resulting book, Haha dewa nakute oya ni naru (母ではなくて、親になる, Becoming a Parent, Not a Mother), was published in 2017.

Yamazaki's first English-language book, a collection of short stories translated by Polly Barton, was published by Strangers Press under the title Friendship for Grown Ups in 2017. In a review for The Japan Society of the UK, Eluned Gramich noted that Yamazaki "seems more interested in the distance between lovers than in what unites them", but also called Friendship for Grown Ups "funny and clever". The Japan Times praised Yamazaki's "skill in evoking the ambiguity of contemporary life" and called the collection "a small book that says a lot about the way we live today".

== Recognition ==
- 2004: 41st Bungei Prize
- 2017: 23rd Shimase Award for Love Stories

== Works ==
=== Selected works in Japanese ===
- Hito no sekkusu o warau na (人のセックスを笑うな, Don't laugh at other people's sex lives), Kawade Shobō Shinsha, 2004, ISBN 9784309016849
- Katsura biyōshitsu besshitsu (カツラ美容室別室, Wig's barber), Kawade Shobō Shinsha, 2007, ISBN 9784309018409
- Te (手, Hand), Bungeishunjū, 2007, ISBN 9784163278209
- Niki no kutsujoku (ニキの屈辱, Niki's humiliation), Kawade Shobō Shinsha, 2011, ISBN 9784309020631
- Beranda engei de kangaeta koto (ベランダ園芸で考えたこと, Balcony gardening and the life), Chikuma Shobō, 2014, ISBN 9784480435941
- Kawaii otto (かわいい夫, Cute husband), Natsuhasha, 2015, ISBN 9784904816189
- Utsukushii kyori (美しい距離, Beautiful distance), Bungeishunjū, 2016, ISBN 9784163904818
- Haha dewa nakute oya ni naru (母ではなくて、親になる, Becoming a Parent, not a Mother), Kawade Shobō Shinsha, 2017, ISBN 9784309025803
- Gishimai (偽姉妹, Fake sisters), Chūōkōron Shinsha, 2018, ISBN 9784120050909
- Shumi de haraippai (趣味で腹いっぱい, Eat Sleep Hobby), Kawade Shobō Shinsha, 2019, ISBN 9784309027784
- Busu no jishin no mochikata (ブスの自信の持ち方, I blow up lookism), Seibundō Shinkōsha, 2019, ISBN 9784416519561
- Ribon no otoko (リボンの男, Full-time dad's economy), Kawade Shobō Shinsha, 2019, ISBN 9784309028521

=== Selected works in English ===
- "The Beginning of the Long End", trans. Takami Nieda, Asymptote Journal, 2013
- "Cavities and Kindness", trans. Kalau Almony, Words Without Borders, 2015
- "Dad, I Love You", trans. Morgan Giles, The Book of Tokyo: A City in Short Fiction, 2015
- "A False Genealogy", trans. Polly Barton, Catapult Magazine, 2015
- Friendship For Grown Ups, trans. Polly Barton, Strangers Press, 2017, ISBN 9781911343028
- "Fossil Candy", trans. Polly Barton, The Arkansas International, 2017
- Don't Laugh at Other People's Sex Lives, trans. Polly Barton, Daunt Books, 2026, ISBN 9781917092357
- Beautiful Distance, trans. Charlotte Goff, Daunt Books, 2026, ISBN 9781917092630
