= Amy Yamada =

Japanese writer

Amy Yamada 山田 詠美
- Born: Yamada Futaba (山田双葉); February 2, 1959 (age 67); Tokyo, Japan
- Occupations: Novelist, short-story writer, essayist
- Writing career
- Pen name: Yamada Eimi (山田詠美)
- Notable works: Bedtime Eyes (1985); Soul Music Lovers Only (1987); Trash (1991); Animal Logic (1996); A2Z (2000)

Amy Yamada (山田 詠美, Yamada Eimi; born February 2, 1959) is a contemporary Japanese writer who is most famous for her stories that address issues of sexuality, racism, and interracial love and marriage. Her debut and subsequent popular success in the 1990s was a part of Japan's hip-hop and Black culture boom. While she is most known for her stories of complicated and messy romantic love, she also writes on the daily minutiae of life (slice-of-life), child-raising, and bullying.

== Biography ==
Yamada Amy (born Yamada Futaba 山田双葉) was born in Itabashi, Tokyo and moved frequently after the age of 2, due to the nature of her father's job. Over the course of her childhood, she lived in Sapporo City, Kaga City, Ashida City, Kanuma City. This transient lifestyle forced her to confront issues of separation and bullying, issues that many of her protagonists also deal with.

According to her interview with the Japanese magazine Bungei, during middle school she was moved by African-American soul music and began to read any novels she could find written by black people, or featuring black people. She held a job in the Roppongi district of Tokyo, an area rich with foreigners. In high school, she was a member of the Arts, Mountaineering, and Literature Club. Her favorite authors were Boris Vian and Francoise Sagan.

After graduating from high school in 1977, she entered Meiji University's Literature Department, but dropped out before graduating. Yamada had a short stint writing and drawing manga under her real name (Yamada Futaba). Her manga debuted in Manga Erogenica and she was featured as a dōjin (fanfic) and female erotic manga artist. While working part-time, she published Sugar Bar (Shugā Bā 1981), Miss Doll (Misu Dōru 1986), and Yokosuka Freaky (Yokosuka Furīkī 1986).

She began writing novels in 1980. Though her works garnered some attention, even receiving praise from Japanese literary critic Jun Etō (江藤淳, Etō Jun), she only achieved widespread recognition in 1985, when Bedtime Eyes won the Bungei Prize and was nominated for the Akutagawa Prize. In writing Bedtime Eyes, Yamada drew upon her experiences with black people and black culture and combined them with the Japanese literary tradition.

In Yamada's second collection of works, Jesse's Spine, Yamada depicts the experiences of a woman who is learning to adjust to life with her lover's child from another relationship. The writing style of this work has been compared to William Saroyan's novel, Papa You're Crazy. Through her depiction of the child's perspective on the world, she was nominated yet again for the Akutagawa Prize (and subsequently again for The Piano Player's Fingers), though she did not receive it.

In 1996, Trash was published in English translation by Kodansha International (translator: Sonya L. Johnson). In May 2006, three of Yamada's novellas (Bedtime Eyes 「ベッドタイム･アイズ」, The Piano Player's Fingers 「指の戯れ」 and Jesse「ジェシーの背骨」) were published in English translation (translators: Yumi Gunji and Marc Jardine) as a single volume by St Martin's Press under the collective title Bedtime Eyes.

== Legacy ==
In her short novels Classroom for the Abandoned Dead, Afterschool Music, and I Can't Study, Yamada tackles the topics of childhood life, bullying, and school life. In an interview with Bungei Shunjū upon winning the Akutagawa Prize, Risa Wataya and Hitomi Kanehara named Yamada's Afterschool Music as one of their major influences, explaining that her works were one of the greatest depictions of modern Japan.

== Prizes ==
- 1985 Bungei Prize---Bedtime Eyes (Beddotaimu Aizu, ベッドタイムアイズ)
- 1987 Naoki Prize---Soul Music Lovers Only (Sōru Myūjikku Rabāzu Onrī, ソウル・ミュージック・ラバーズ・オンリー)
- 1989 Hirabayashi Taiko Bungaku Prize---Classroom for the Abandoned Dead (Fūsō no Kyōshitsu, 風葬の教室 )
- 1991 Jyoryū Bungaku Prize---Trash (Torasshu, トラッシュ)
- 1996 Izumi Kyōka Prize for Literature---Animal Logic (Animaru Rojikku, アニマル・ロジック)
- 2000 Yomiuri Prize---A2Z
- 2005 Tanizaki Prize---Wonderful Flavor (Fūmizekka, 風味絶佳)
- 2012 Noma Bungei Prize---Gentleman (Jentoruman, ジェントルマン)
- 2016 Kawabata Yasunari Bungei Prize---Perishable Teru Teru Bozu (Seishin Teru Teru Bōzu, 生鮮てるてる坊主)

== Works in English ==
Title	Year	Translator	Publisher
"Kneel Down and Lick My Feet" in Monkey Brain Sushi: New Tastes In Japanese Fiction	1991	Terry Gallagher	Kodansha International
Trash	1994	Sonya Johnson	Kodansha International
"Fiesta" in Inside and Other Short Fiction	2006	Cathy Lane (Compiler)	Kodansha International
Bedtime Eyes	2006	Yumi Gunji/Marc Jardine	St. Martin's Press

== Major works ==
- ベッドタイムアイズ (Beddotaimu Aizu) Bedtime Eyes (1985)
- ジェシーの背骨 (Jeshī no Sebone) Jesse's Spine (1986)
- ソウル・ミュージック・ラバーズ・オンリー (Sōru Myūjikku Rabāzu Onrī) Soul Music Lovers Only (1987)
- 風葬の教室 (Fūsō no Kyōshitsu) Classroom for the Abandoned Dead (1988)
- 放課後の音符 (Hōkago no Kii Nooto) Afterschool Music (1989)
- トラッシュ (Torasshu) Trash (1991)
- 僕は勉強ができない (Boku wa Benkyō ga Dekinai) I Can't Study (1993)
- 120%COOOL (120% COOOL) 120%COOOL (1994)
- アニマル・ロジック (Animaru Rojikku) Animal Logic (1996)
- 4U (1997)
- MAGNET (1999)
- A2Z (2003)
- PAY DAY!!! (2003)

== Adapted to film and television ==
Title	in Japanese	Year	Production	Director
Bedtime Eyes	ベッドタイムアイズ	1987	Herald Film (ヘラルド映画)	Kumashiro Tatsumi (神代辰巳)
Soul Music Lovers Only	ソウル・ミュージック・ラバーズ・オンリー	1988	Promotive Eye21 (プロモ—ティヴEye21)	Ohara Kōyū (小原宏裕)
I Cant Study!	ぼくは勉強できない	1996	Toho	Yamamoto Yasuhiko (山本泰彦)
Sugar and Spice	シュガー&スパイス 風味絶佳	2006	Toho	Nakae Isamu (中江功)
Evening Meal (includes Wonderful Flavor)	夕餉（「風味絶佳」収録）	2013	NHK series Anime Time for Adult Women (大人女子アニメタイム)	
Kenji's Love	賢者の愛	2016	TV Drama	
