= Rin Usami =

Japanese novelist

- Native name: 宇佐見 りん
- Born: 16 May 1999 (age 26) Numazu, Shizuoka, Japan
- Language: Japanese
- Period: 2019 -
- Genre: novels
- Notable awards: Bungei Prize (2019); Mishima Yukio Prize (2020); Akutagawa Prize (2021)

Rin Usami (宇佐見 りん, Hepburn: Usami Rin, born 16 May 1999) is a Japanese novelist.

== Career ==
Usami was born in Numazu, Shizuoka, and raised in Kanagawa Prefecture. For her first work Kaka (かか) she was awarded the Bungei Prize in 2019 as well as the Mishima Yukio Prize, which made her the youngest holder of the prize. She was also awarded the 164th Akutagawa Prize for her second work Oshi, Moyu (推し、燃ゆ).

== Bibliography ==
- Kaka (かか), 2019
- Idol, Burning (推し、燃ゆ), 2022
