= Masayo Yamamoto =

Japanese novelist

Masayo Yamamoto (山本昌代; born August 18, 1960) is a Japanese novelist. She is best known for her 1983 Ooi Tantan Roku (応為坦坦録), which won the Bungei Prize.

== Biography ==
Yamamoto was born on August 18, 1960, in Kanagawa prefecture, Japan. She attended Tsuda University, and her novel Ooi Tantan Roku (応為坦坦録) won the Bungei Prize while she was in school. Her novels Butagami Matsuri (豚神祀り), Haru no Tayori (春のたより), and Uminari (海鳴り) were all shortlisted for the Akutagawa Award, but did not win. In 1995 she won the Mishima Yukio Prize for her novel Midori-iro no Nigotta Ocha Arui wa Kōfuku no Sampo-michi (緑色の濁ったお茶あるいは幸福の散歩道).

== Selected works ==
- Ooi Tantan Roku (応為坦坦録), 1983
- Butagami Matsuri (豚神祀り), 1986
- Haru no Tayori (春のたより), 1987
- Midori-iro no Nigotta Ocha Arui wa Kōfuku no Sampo-michi (緑色の濁ったお茶あるいは幸福の散歩道), 1995
- Uminari (海鳴り), 1996
