= Kazuko Saegusa =

Japanese novelist (1929–2003)

Kazuko Saegusa (三枝和子) (March 31, 1929 – April 24, 2003) was a Japanese novelist. She won the Tamura Toshiko Award and the Izumi Kyoka Prize for Literature.

== Early life and education ==
Saegusa was born Yotsumoto Kazuko on March 31, 1929 in Kobe. She was the oldest of four children. Her father's job made him transfer locations throughout Hyogo prefecture regularly, so Saegusa moved often. Her mother was a Protestant, and took her children to church with her. Saegusa was an avid reader as a child, and began writing in middle school. In 1944, Saegusa worked at a factory in Nagasaki because of the National Mobilization Law. She returned to Hyogo in April 1945 to attend school.

Saegusa studied philosophy at the Kwansei Gakuin University, graduating in 1950. She was a member of a Dostoyevsky study group. She went to graduate school at the same university, focusing her studies on Hegel. She met Koichi Saegusa (his penname was Tatsuya Morikawa) while studying at the university. They married in 1951 and moved to Kyoto.

== Career ==
While living in Kyoto they worked as middle school teachers and published literary magazines. Koichi inherited his father's temple in 1962, so they moved to Takino, Hyogo and lived in the temple. They both stopped teaching, and Saegusa became a writer full-time. Koichi started a journal in 1964, and Saegusa published much of her writing there during the late 1960s and early 1970s. Her book Sōsō no asa (葬送の朝) was an honorable mention for the Bungei Prize in 1963. In 1969 she won the Tamura Toshiko Prize for her short story, "Shokei ga okonawareteiru". Her book Onidomo no Yoru wa Fukai (鬼どもの夜は深い) won the Izumi Kyoka Prize for Literature in 1983.

From the 1980s onward she split her time between Tokyo and Takino. She also frequently visited Greece. She died on April 24, 2003.

== Style ==
Saegusa's style is dark, with unreliable narrators who hallucinate and are obsessed with fate and death. Frequent themes include Japan's defeat in World War II, men's view of womanhood, and the collapse of social institutions like villages and families. Her studies of Greek and Roman literature and mythology have also had a clear influence on her writing.

Some of her books, like Sono hi no natsu, show a female perspective of war and its aftermath in contrast to typical war novels that have male protagonists.

== Selected bibliography ==
=== Short stories ===
- Getsuyoubi no yoru no koto (月曜日のよるのこと), 1965
- Shokei ga okonawareteiru (処刑が行なわれている), 1969

=== Novels ===
- Hachigatsu no shura (八月の修羅), 1972 (originally titled 'Sōsō no asa (葬送の朝))
- Ranhansha (乱反射), 1973
- Tsuki no tobu mura (月の飛ぶ村), 1979
- Omoigakezu kaze no cho (思いがけず風の蝶), 1980
- Onidomo no Yoru wa Fukai (鬼どもの夜は深い), 1983
- Hookai kokuchi (崩壊告知), 1985
- Onnatachi wa kodai e tobu (女たちは古代へ翔ぶ), 1986
- Sono hi no natsu (その日の夏), 1987
- Murakumo no mura no monogatari (群ら雲の村の物語), 1987
