= Takahiro Ueda =

Japanese novelist

Takahiro Ueda (上田 岳弘, Ueda Takahiro) is a Japanese novelist. He won the 2019 Akutagawa Prize for his science-fiction novel Nimuroddo (Nimrod), which "depicts relations between the advancement of science and humanism with a focus on cryptocurrency". He also won the 2015 Mishima Prize for My One True Love.

In 2016, he was named by Granta magazine as one of the best young Japanese novelists.
