= Maki Kashimada =

Japanese writer

- 鹿島田 真希
- Born: 1976 (age 49–50); Japan
- Occupation: Writer
- Writing career
- Language: Japanese
- Genres: Fiction; Short story; Experimental literature
- Notable works: Nihiki; Rokusendo no ai; Pikarudi no sando; Meido meguri
- Notable awards: Bungei Prize; Mishima Yukio Prize; Noma Literary Prize; Akutagawa Prize

Maki Kashimada (鹿島田 真希, Kashimada Maki; born 1976) is a Japanese writer. She has won the Bungei Prize, the Mishima Yukio Prize, the Noma Literary Prize, and the Akutagawa Prize.

== Early life and education ==
Kashimada was born in Tokyo, Japan. In 1998, while still a university student, she submitted her work Nihiki for the Bungei Prize, winning the 35th Bungei Prize. She later graduated from Shirayuri Women's University after writing a thesis on Julia Kristeva.

== Career ==
In 2005 Kashimada won the 18th Mishima Yukio Prize for Rokusendo no ai (Love at Six Thousand Degrees), a story set in Nagasaki and loosely inspired by Marguerite Duras' screenplay for Hiroshima mon amour. In 2007 Kashimada won the 29th Noma Literary Prize for Pikarudī no sando. In 2012, after having her work nominated for the Akutagawa Prize multiple times and almost sharing the award with Akiko Akazome in 2010, Kashimada won the 147th Akutagawa Prize for Meido meguri (Touring the Land of the Dead).

== Personal life ==
Kashimada is a member of the Japanese Orthodox Church and is married to a member of the clergy.

== Recognition ==
- 1998 35th Bungei Prize
- 2005 18th Mishima Yukio Prize
- 2007 29th Noma Literary New Face Prize
- 2012 147th Akutagawa Prize (2012上)

== Works ==
=== In Japanese ===
- Nihiki (二匹), Kawade Shobō Shinsha, 1999, ISBN 9784309012605
- Region no hanayome (レギオンの花嫁), Kawade Shobō Shinsha, 2000, ISBN 9784309013381
- Hitori no kanashimi wa sekai no owari ni hitteki suru (一人の哀しみは世界の終りに匹敵する), Kawade Shobō Shinsha, 2003, ISBN 9784309015491
- Shirobara yonshimai satsujin jiken (白バラ四姉妹殺人事件), Shinchosha, 2004, ISBN 9784104695010
- Rokusendo no ai (六〇〇〇度の愛), Shinchosha, 2005, ISBN 9784104695027
- Nanbā wan konsutorakushon (ナンバーワン・コンストラクション), Shinchosha, 2006, ISBN 9784104695034
- Pikarudī no sando (ピカルディーの三度), Kodansha, 2007, ISBN 9784062142755
- Zero no ōkoku (ゼロの王国), Kodansha, 2009, ISBN 9784062154147
- Ōgon no saru (黄金の猿), Bungeishunjū, 2009, ISBN 9784163283401
- Onna no niwa (女の庭), Kawade Shobō Shinsha, 2009, ISBN 9784309019024
- Kitare yakyūbu (来たれ, 野球部), Kodansha, 2011, ISBN 9784062172851
- Meido meguri (冥土めぐり), Kawade Shobō Shinsha, 2012, ISBN 9784309021225
- Sono akatsuki no nurusa (その暁のぬるさ), Shueisha, 2012, ISBN 9784087713725
- Harumonia (ハルモニア), Shinchosha, 2013, ISBN 9784104695041
- Kurete iku ai (暮れていく愛), Bungeishunjū, 2013, ISBN 9784163821405
- Shōjo no tame no himitsu no seisho (少女のための秘密の聖書), Shinchosha, 2014, ISBN 9784104695058
- Shōnen seijo (少年聖女), Kawade Shobō Shinsha, 2016, ISBN 9784309025001
- Erabareshi kowareyatachi (選ばれし壊れ屋たち), Bungeishunjū, 2016, ISBN 9784163904351

=== In English ===
- "The Interview", trans. Jocelyne Allen, Japan Earthquake Charity Literature, 2012
- Touring the Land of the Dead, trans. Haydn Trowell, Europa Editions, 2021, ISBN 9781609456511
- Love at Six Thousand Degrees. Europa Editions. 7 March 2023. ISBN 978-1-60945-819-5.
