= Bungei Prize =

Japanese literary award

The Bungei Prize (文藝賞, Bungeishō) is a Japanese literary award given by publishing company Kawade Shobō Shinsha. It was first awarded in 1962. The award is intended to recognize new writers, and several famous Japanese writers have won the award, but many Bungei Prize winners have not achieved any further literary recognition.

== Awards history ==
For the first two years in 1962 and 1963, awards were given in dramatic works, short and medium stories, and long works categories. From 1964, all works were judged in a single category. In 1965 no prize selection process was held, thus 1964 is the third award, and 1966 is the fourth. In 1967 and 2010 no works were judged worthy of the award. In 1968, due to the bankruptcy of Kawade Shobō ShinshaIn, the sixth award was delayed by one year until 1969. In 1969, the selected winner, Nakano Shuhei, refused to accept the award.

== Winners ==
Kawade Shobō Shinsha maintains a complete official list of winning works.

| Year | Winner | Winning Work | Author later won |
|---|---|---|---|
| 1962 | Kazumi Takahashi | 悲の器 (Hinoutsuwa) | |
| | Meisei Gotō | Honorable mention for 関係 (Kankei) | Taiko Hirabayashi Literary Award (1977), Tanizaki Prize (1981), Arts Selection Award (1990) |
| 1963 | Kazuko Saegusa | Honorable mention for 葬送の朝 (Sōsō no asa) | Izumi Kyōka Prize for Literature, Tamura Toshiko Award |
| 1964 | No winner | | |
| | Komitsu Kitakoji | Honorable mention for ミクロコスモス (Mikurokosumosu) | |
| 1966 | Ei Kinkaku/Kim Hak Young | 凍える口 | |
| | Atsumi Kato | Honorable mention for 大山兵曹 (Ōyama heisō) | |
| | Shôjo Tadashi | Honorable mention for 塔への道 (Tō e no michi) | |
| 1967 | No winner | | |
| | Noboru Tsujihara | Honorable mention for ミチオ・カンタービレ (Michio kantābire) | |
| | Fukunaga Reizo | Honorable mention for 家路 (Ie-ji) | |
| 1969 | No winner | | |
| | Shuhei Nonaka | 鈍夜 (Don yoru) (refusé) | |
| 1970 | Eiji Kurobane | 目的補語 (Mokuteki ho-go) | |
| | Asako Onogi | クリスマスの旅 (Kurisumasu no tabi) | |
| 1971 | Motoya Honda | 家のなか・なかの家 (Ie non aka, naka no ie) | |
| | Minako Goto | 刻を曳く (Koku o hiku) | |
| 1972 | Shuya Odaka | 危うい歳月 (Ayaui saigetsu) | |
| 1973 | No winner | | |
| | Teruaki Kitazawa | Honorable mention for あわいの構図 (Awai no kōzu) | |
| | Seiichi Akasaka | Honorable mention for 帰らざる道 (Kaerazaru michi) | |
| 1974 | Fuyu Ozawa | | |
| 1975 | Seiichiro Aka | 世の中や (世 の 中や) | |
| 1976 | Hidetoshi Tooka | 北帰行 (Kitakikō) | |
| | Mitsuyoshi Nomura | Honorable mention for 輝かしき愚者の砦 (Kagayakashiki gusha no toride) | |
| 1977 | Mitsunori Hoshino | おれたちの熱い季節 (Ore-tachi no atsui kisetsu) | |
| | Yohei Matsuzaki | 狂いだすのは三月 (Kurui dasu no wa 3 gatsu) | |
| 1978 | Kojiro Kuroda | 鳥たちの闇のみち (Tori-tachi no yami no michi) | |
| | Keiko Kobayashi | Honorable mention for 回帰点 (Kaiki-ten) | |
| 1979 | Katsusuke Miyauchi | 南 (Nanpū) | Yomiuri Prize, Itō Sei Literary Prize |
| | Masako Meiō | ある女のグリンプス (Aru on'na no gurinpusu) | |
| 1980 | Yasuo Tanaka | なんとなく、クリスタル (Nantokunaku, kurisutaru) | |
| | Kenji Aoyama | 囚人のうた (Shūjin no uta) | |
| | Mami Nakahira | ストレイ・シー プ (Sutorei shīpu) | |
| 1981 | Sachi Fukuda | 百色メガネ (Hyaku-shoku megane) | |
| | Akemi Hotta | 1980 アイコ 十六歳 (1980 Aiko jū roku-sai) | |
| | Misuzu Yamamoto | みのむし (Mi no mushi) | |
| 1982 | Jun Hirano | 日曜日には愛の胡瓜を (Nichiyōbini wa ai no kyuuri o) | |
| | Terai Sumi | Cancelled award for レーシングカーに乗った聖者 (Rēshingukā ni notta seija) | |
| 1983 | Masayo Yamamoto | 応為坦坦錄 (Ōi tantanroku ) | Mishima Yukio Prize |
| | Wakaichi Koji | 海に夜を重ねて (Umi ni yoru o kasanete) | |
| 1984 | Jōji Atsumi | ミッドナイト・ホモサピエンス (Middonaito, homo sapiensu) | |
| | Yuichi Hiranaka | シーズレイン (She's Rain) | |
| 1985 | Eimi Yamada | ベッドタイムアイズ (Beddo taimu aizu) | Naoki Prize, Izumi Kyōka Prize for Literature, Yomiuri Prize, Tanizaki Prize |
| 1986 | Sumiko Okamoto | 零れた言葉 (Koboreta kotoba) | |
| | Umeda Kako | Honorable mention for 勝利投手 (Shōri tōshu) | |
| 1987 | Kazuzo Sasayama | 四万十川 あつよしの夏 (Shimantogawa a tsuyoshi no natsu) | Mishima Yukio Prize |
| | Jūgi Hisama | Mention honorable pour マネーゲーム (Monê gêmu) | |
| 1988 | Mayumi Nagano | 少年アリス (Shōnen Arisu ) | Izumi Kyōka Prize for Literature, Noma Literary Prize |
| | Kazuichi Iijima | 汝ふたたび故郷へ帰れず (Nanji futatabi furusato e kaerezu) | |
| 1989 | Sunao Ashihara | YES・YES・YES | Naoki Prize |
| | Mako Yūki | ハッピーハウス (Happī hausu) | |
| 1990 | Aohara Sunao | 青春デンデケデケデケ (Seishun dendeke dekedeke) | |
| 1991 | Shunji Kawamoto | rose | |
| | Yoshino Hikaru | 撃壌歌 (Gekijō uta) | |
| 1992 | Megumi Miura | 音符 (Onpu) | |
| | Kenichi Maki | Honorable mention for 白い血 (Shiroi chi) | |
| 1993 | No winner | | |
| | Kei Ôishi | Excellence mention for 履き忘れたもう片方の靴 (Haki wasureta mō katahō no kutsu) | |
| | Yoichiro Kotake | Excellence mention for DMAC | |
| 1994 | Zero Amemori | 首飾り (Kubikazari) | |
| 1995 | Takami Itō | 助手席にて、グルグル・ダンスを踊って (Joshuseki nite, guruguru dansu o odotte) | Akutagawa Prize |
| 1996 | No winner | | |
| | Kazumasa Oga | Excellence mention for フレア (Flare) | |
| | Ariko Sato | Excellence mention for ボディ・レンタル (Body Rental) | |
| 1997 | Seigō Suzuki | ラジオデイズ (Rajo daizu) | Mishima Yukio Prize |
| | Tomoyuki Hoshino | 最後の吐息 (Saigo no toiki) | Noma Literary New Face Prize, Mishima Yukio Prize |
| 1998 | Maki Kashimada | 二匹 (Nihiki) | Mishima Yukio Prize, Noma Literary New Face Prize, Akutagawa Prize |
| 1999 | Junko Hamada | Tiny, tiny | |
| 2000 | Akira Kuroda | メイドインン (Made in Japan) | |
| | Tomoka Sato | Excellence mention for 肉触 Nikushoku) | |
| 2001 | Risa Wataya | インストール (Install) | Akutagawa Prize, Kenzaburō Ōe Prize |
| 2002 | Nakamura Wataru | リレキショ (Rerekisho) | |
| | Tomohiko Okada | キッズ アー オールライト (Kizzu ā ōruraito (Kids are all right)) | |
| 2003 | Keisuke Hada | 黒冷水 (Kokureisui) | Akutagawa Prize |
| | Ikuta Sayo | オアシス (Oasis) | |
| | Noriaki Fushimi | 魔女の息子 (Majo no musuko) | |
| 2004 | Nao-Cola Yamazaki | 人のセックスを笑うな (Hito no sekkusu o warauna) | Shimase Award for Love Stories |
| | Gen Shiraiwa | 野ブタ。をプロデュース (No buta. O purodyūsu) | |
| 2005 | Nanae Aoyama | 窓の灯 (Mado no akari) | Akutagawa Prize |
| | Minami Natsu | 平成マシンガンズ (Heisei mashinganzu) | |
| 2006 | Iwora Ogiyo | 公園 (Kōen) | |
| | Saki Nakayama | ヘンリエッタ (Henrietta) | |
| 2007 | Ken'ichirō Isozaki | 肝心の子供 (Kanjin no kodomo) | |
| | Kenta Tange | 青色讃歌 (Aoiro sanka) | |
| 2008 | Fuari Kita | けちゃっぷ (Ketchup) | |
| | Yûta Yasuto | おひるのたびにさようなら (O hiru no tabi ni sayōnara) | |
| 2009 | Ômori Brothers (Ômori Kyōdai) | 犬はいつも足元にいて (Inu wa itsumo ashimoto ni ite) | |
| | Izumi Fujishiro | ボーダー&レス (Bōdā & resu) | |
| 2010 | No winner | | |
| 2011 | Tomoki Imamura | クリスタル・ヴァリーに降りそそぐ灰 (Crystal Valley ni furisosogu hai) | |
| 2012 | Naoko Tanigawa | おしかくさま (Oshikaku-sama) | |
| 2013 | Haruya Sakurai | 世界泥棒 (Sekai dorobō) | |
| 2014 | Yondoku I | 死にたくなったら電話して (Shinitaku nattara denwa shite) | |
| | Kaoru Kaneko | アルタッドに捧ぐ (Arutaddo ni sasagu) | |
| 2015 | Hiroka Yamashita | ドール (Doll) | |
| | Ushio Hatakeyama | 地の底の記憶 (Ji no soko no kioku) | |
| 2016 | Ryōhei Machiya | 青が破れる (Ao ga yabureru) | |
| 2017 | Chisako Wakatake | おらおらでひとりいぐも (Ora ora de hitori igumo) | Akutagawa Prize |
| 2018 | Hideyuki Hikami | はんぷくするもの (Hanpuku suru mono) | |
| | Tarō Yamanobe | いつか深い穴に落ちるまで (Itsuka fukai ananiochiru made) | |
| 2019 | Rin Usami | かか (Kaka) | Mishima Yukio Prize, Akutagawa Prize |
| | Haruka Tōno | 改良 (Kairyō) | Akutagawa Prize |
| 2020 | Mū Fujiwara | 水と礫 (Mizu to tsubute) | |
| | Kurumi Arata | Excellence mention for 星に帰れよ (Hoshi ni kaereyo) | |
| 2021 | Daichi Sawa | 眼球達磨式 (Gankyū daruma-shiki) | |
| 2022 | Jose Andō | ジャクソンひとり (Jakuson hitori) | |
| | Coleco Hibino | ビューティフルからビューティフルへ (Byūtifuru kara byūtifuru e) | |
| 2023 | Ayako Koizumi | 無敵の犬の夜 (Muteki no inu no yoru) | |
| | Riku Sasaki | Excellence mention for 解答者は走ってください (Kaitō-sha wa hashitte kudasai) | |
| | Shō Zuno | Excellence mention for おわりのそこみえ (Owari no soko mie) | |
| | Short story prize Fuyuki Nishino | 子宮の夢 (Shikyū no yume) | |
| | Short story prize Kei Saitani | Excellence mention for 海を吸う (Umi o suu) | |
| 2024 | Saji Machikawa | 光のそこで白くねむる (Hikari no soko de shiroku nemuru) | |
| | Irino Matsuda | ハイパーたいくつ (Haipāta ikutsu) | |

== See also ==
- List of Japanese literary awards
