= Tomoyuki Hoshino =

Japanese writer

Tomoyuki Hoshino (星野 智幸, Hoshino Tomoyuki, born July 13, 1965) is a Japanese writer. He has won the Bungei Prize, the Mishima Yukio Prize, the Noma Literary New Face Prize, the Ōe Kenzaburō Prize, the Yomiuri Prize, and the Tanizaki Prize.

== Biography ==
Born in Los Angeles, he accompanied his family back to Japan before he was three years old. He attended Waseda University and worked for a while as a journalist after graduating in 1988. He spent the better part of the years 1990-5 living in Mexico before returning to Japan, where for a time he worked translating from Spanish-language movies into Japanese. In 1997 he published his first novel The Last Gasp, for which he was awarded the Bungei Prize. He won the 13th Yukio Mishima Prize for his second novel The Mermaid Sings Wake Up, which was published in 2000. He won the Noma Literary New Face Prize for Fantasista in 2003. Other works include The Poisoned Singles Hot Springs (2002), Naburiai (2003), Lonely Hearts Killer (2004), Alkaloid Lovers (2005), The Worussian-Japanese Tragedy (2006), The Story of Rainbow and Chloe (2006), and the collection We the Children of Cats (2006). His short story "Sand Planet" was nominated for the Akutagawa Prize for 2002.

He has published many short stories and essays, both fiction and non-fiction. He also writes guest commentaries for newspapers and journals on sports (especially soccer), Latin America, politics, nationalism, and the arts. His short story "Chino" has been translated into English by Lucy Fraser, and is now part of his short story collection "We, the Children of Cats" (2012), published by PM Press and otherwise translated by Brian Bergstrom; his novel Lonely Hearts Killer has been translated into English by Adrienne Hurley and likewise published by PM Press.

Hoshino travels frequently and has participated in writers' caravans with authors from Taiwan, India, and elsewhere. In 2006, his critique of Ichiro Suzuki's remarks at the World Baseball Classic were considered controversial by some, and so have some of his other writings related to Japanese nationalism, the emperor, sexuality, bullying, and Japanese society. Also in 2006, the literary journal Bungei dedicated a special issue to Hoshino and his work. He teaches creative writing at Waseda, his alma mater. In January 2007, he was nominated again for the Akutagawa Prize, this time for Plant Examination Room (植物診断室).

In 2011, Hoshino won the Kenzaburō Ōe Prize for his novel Ore Ore (2010), which explores the meaning of identity in the postmodern world. The title takes its name from the first-person Japanese pronoun ore (俺, 'I' or 'me'). Early in the novel, the narrator engages in a kind of scam known in Japan as a ore-ore sagi (俺俺詐欺, 'me-me scam'), in which he calls up an older person, pretends to be a relative, and tries to get the person on the other end of the phone line to send money. In the novel, the narrator finds himself unwittingly pulled into the life of the person whose identity he has fraudulently assumed, at the same time that someone else assumes his identity. This starts a chain-reaction of identity-stealing that extends to the edges of society, creating an increasingly surreal and dangerous world in which no one is exactly who they seem. The novel has been translated as ME by Charles De Wolf for Akashic Books.

In 2014 Hoshino won the Yomiuri Prize for Yoru wa owaranai (夜は終わらない, The Night Is Not Over), a novel based on One Thousand and One Nights that shifts narrative voice to misdirect the reader. In 2018 he won the Tanizaki Prize for Honō (焰).

== Bibliography ==
=== Selected works in Japanese ===
- Yoru wa owaranai (夜は終わらない, The Night Is Not Over), Kodansha, 2014, ISBN 9784062189668

=== Selected works in English ===
- "Chino," trans. by Lucy Fraser, Japan Fiction Project, 2006
- "ME" (Ore ore (俺俺), 2010), translated from the Japanese by Charles De Wolf, Akashic Books, New York 2017, ISBN 978-1-61775-448-7
