= Yukiko Motoya =

Japanese novelist, playwright, and theatre director

- 本谷 有希子
- Born: July 14, 1979 (age 47); Hakusan, Ishikawa, Japan
- Occupations: Novelist; playwright; theatre director; voice actress
- Years active: 2000–present
- Notable work: Irui konin tan; Nurui doku; Sōnan; Shiawase saiko arigatō maji de!
- Spouse: Kite Okachimachi
- Awards: Akutagawa Prize; Noma Literary Prize; Mishima Yukio Prize; Kenzaburo Oe Prize; Kishida Prize for Drama; Tsuruya Nanboku Drama Award
- Writing career
- Language: Japanese
- Genres: Fiction; short story; plays
- Website: www.motoyayukiko.com

Yukiko Motoya (本谷 有希子, Motoya Yukiko; born July 14, 1979) is a Japanese novelist, playwright, theatre director, and former voice actress. She has won numerous Japanese literary and dramatic awards, including the Akutagawa Prize, the Noma Literary New Face Prize, the Mishima Yukio Prize, the Kenzaburo Oe Prize, the Kishida Kunio Drama Award, and the Tsuruya Nanboku Drama Award. Her work has been adapted multiple times for film.

== Early life and education ==
Motoya was born in Hakusan, Ishikawa. As a child she read mystery stories by Agatha Christie, Arthur Conan Doyle, and Edogawa Ranpo, as well as horror manga. After completing high school, Motoya moved to Tokyo to study acting, and won a voice acting role in the Hideaki Anno anime adaptation of Kare Kano, but switched her focus to writing after a teacher praised a short play Motoya wrote for the school's graduation ceremony. She founded her own theater company, called Gekidan Motoyo Yukiko (Motoya Yukiko Theater Company), in 2000, and began writing and staging her own plays. She appears in the ending sequences of FLCL during credits, in which she's listed as model.

== Career ==
=== Novelist ===
In 2002, prompted by a magazine editor's invitation, Motoya made her fiction debut with the short story Eriko to zettai (Eriko and Absolutely). It became the title story of a 2003 collection published by Kodansha. Her novel Funuke domo kanashimi no ai o misero (Funuke Show Some Love, You Losers!) was published in 2005. It was adapted into the 2007 Daihachi Yoshida film Funuke Show Some Love, You Losers!, starring Eriko Sato and Hiromi Nagasaku, which was shown at the Cannes Film Festival.

Motoya's novel Ikiteru dake de ai (Love at Least), about an unemployed and apparently depressed woman's relationship with her boyfriend, was published in 2006 by Shinchosha. Ikiteru dake de ai was nominated for the Akutagawa Prize, and was later adapted into a 2018 film of the same name. Motoya's 2009 novel Ano ko no kangaeru koto wa hen (That Girl's Got Some Strange Ideas) was nominated for the 141st Akutagawa Prize. She was nominated a third time for her 2011 novel Nurui doku (Warm Poison), about a woman who has a relationship with a pathological liar claiming to be a former high school classmate. Though Nurui doku did not win the Akutagawa Prize, it won the 33rd Noma Literary New Face Prize. Motoya subsequently won the 7th Kenzaburo Oe Prize for her 2012 collection Arashi no pikunikku (Picnic in the Storm), and the 27th Mishima Yukio Prize for her 2013 novel Jibun wo suki ni naru houhou.

In 2016, on her fourth nomination, Motoya won the 154th Akutagawa Prize for her story Irui konin tan (Tales of Marriage to a Different Sort), in which a wife discovers that she and her husband look more and more alike as they grow older together. At the prize ceremony the press commented on her mismatched socks, leading Motoya to admit that she had not expected to win, and had rushed to the prize ceremony without any special preparation. The prize-winning work became the title story of a collection of four stories published later that year by Kodansha.

In 2018 a collection of Motoya's stories, translated into English by Asa Yoneda, was published under the title The Lonesome Bodybuilder in the United States. It included a new translation of Irui konin tan under the title "An Exotic Marriage". Writing for The New York Times, Weike Wang praised Motoya's stories, noting that Motoya "wins over her audience by pushing the absurd to extremes". Nilanjana Roy, in her review for the Financial Times, concluded that "Yukiko Motoya’s shivery, murmuring voice will never completely leave you".

=== Playwright and director ===
Motoya continued writing and directing plays for her theatre company while also writing short stories and novels, and in 2006 she became the youngest person ever to win the Tsuruya Nanboku Memorial Award for Best Play, which she received for her play Sōnan (Distress). That same year she visited the United States as part of a Japan Foundation-sponsored exchange program for playwrights. An English version of her play Vengeance can Wait, translated by Kyoko Yoshida and Andy Bragen, premiered in 2008 at the Best of Boroughs Festival in New York City. In 2009 her play Shiawase saiko arigatō maji de, about a woman who enters a couple's home and declares that she is the husband's mistress, won the 53rd Kishida Kunio Drama Award. A film adaptation of Ranbō to taiki (Vengeance Can Wait), directed by Masanori Tominaga and starring Tadanobu Asano, Minami Hinase, and Eiko Koike, premiered in Japan the next year.

=== Media personality ===
Nobuko Tanaka of The Japan Times has called Motoya "the darling of Japanese media" for her frequent contributions to Japanese magazines, television, and radio. From 2005 to 2006 Motoya was the Friday host for Nippon Broadcasting System's late night radio show All Night Nippon. Starting in 2014 she was a regular host for Season 4 of the TBS Radio program "The Top 5". As of 2017 she is co-host of the Fuji TV documentary series 7 Rules.

== Personal life ==
In 2013 Motoya married the poet, lyricist and film director Kite Okachimachi. Her first daughter was born in October 2015.

== Recognition ==
- 2006 10th Tsuruya Nanboku Drama Award, Best Play category
- 2009 53rd Kishida Kunio Drama Award
- 2011 33rd Noma Literary New Face Prize
- 2013 7th Ōe Kenzaburō Prize
- 2014 27th Mishima Yukio Prize
- 2016 154th Akutagawa Prize (2015下)

== Film and other adaptations ==
- Funuke domo, kanashimi no ai o misero (Funuke, Show Some Love you Losers!), 2007
- Ranbō to taiki (Vengeance Can Wait), 2010
- Ikiteru dake de, ai (Love at Least), 2018

== Bibliography ==
=== Books ===
- Eriko to zettai: Motoya yukiko bungaku daizenshū, Kodansha, 2003, ISBN 9784062119276
- Funuke domo kanashimi no ai o misero (Funuke, Show Some Love you Losers!), Kodansha, 2005, ISBN 9784062129985
- Zetsubo (Despair), Kodansha, 2006, ISBN 9784062133241
- Ikiteru dake de, ai (Just Living is Love), Shinchosha, 2006, ISBN 9784103017714
- Imaman Motoya Yukiko manga-ka intabyū & taidanshū, Komakusa Shuppan, 2007, ISBN 9784903186511
- Hontanichan, Ōta Shuppan, 2008, ISBN 9784778311162
- Ano ko no kangaeru koto wa hen (That Girl's Got Some Strange Ideas), Kodansha, 2009, ISBN 9784062156387
- Nurui doku (Warm Poison), Shinchosha, 2011, ISBN 9784103017745
- Guamu (Guam), Shinchosha, 2011, ISBN 9784101371726
- Arashi no pikunikku (Picnic in the Storm), Kodansha, 2012, ISBN 9784062177047
- Jibun wo suki ni naru houhou, Kodansha, 2013, ISBN 9784062184557
- Irui konin tan, Kodansha, 2016, ISBN 9784062199001

=== Plays ===
- Sōnan (Distress), Kodansha, 2007, ISBN 9784062140744
- Henro, Shinchosha, 2008, ISBN 9784103017738
- Shiawase saiko arigatō maji de! (I'm Happy, It's Fantastic, Thank you, Really!), Kodansha, 2009, ISBN 9784062153638
- Rai rai rai rai rai, Hakusuisha, 2010, ISBN 9784560080801

=== Selected work in English ===
- Vengeance Can Wait, trans. Kyoko Yoshida and Andy Bragen, Samuel French, 2012, ISBN 9780573700187
- "That Morning, When It", trans. Michael Staley, Words Without Borders, 2012
- "The Dogs", trans. Asa Yoneda, Granta 127, 2014
- "Why I Can No Longer Look at a Picnic Blanket Without Laughing", trans. Asa Yoneda, Granta 129, 2014
- "What I Felt by Exposing My Body", Wochi Kochi Magazine, 2014
- "The Reason I Carry Biscuits to Offer to Young Boys", trans. Asa Yoneda, Catapult, 2015
- "The Lonesome Bodybuilder", trans. Asa Yoneda, Electric Literature, 2018
- The Lonesome Bodybuilder, trans. Asa Yoneda, Soft Skull Press, 2018, ISBN 9781593766788
