= Ōe Kenzaburō Prize =

Japanese literary award

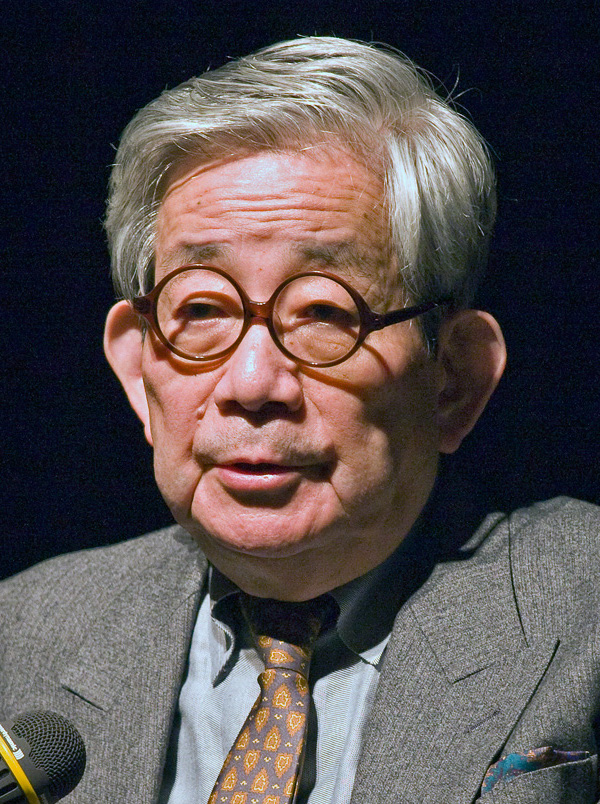
Kenzaburō Ōe, whom the award is named after

The Kenzaburō Ōe Prize (大江健三郎賞) was a Japanese literary award sponsored by Kodansha (講談社) and established in 2006 to commemorate both the 100th anniversary of Kodansha's establishment and 50th anniversary of the writing life of Kenzaburō Ōe (大江健三郎). The award was for Japanese literary novels published in the previous year, with the winning work selected solely by Ōe. The winner received no cash award, but several winning works were translated into other languages, such as English, French and German, for publication. Kenzaburō Ōe had an open conversation with each winner. The final prize was awarded in 2014, and the collected selection commentary and dialogues were reprinted in a single volume published by Kodansha in 2018.

== List of winners ==
Year	Author	Japanese title	English title	Ref
2007	長嶋有; Yū Nagashima	夕子ちゃんの近道; Yūko-chan no Chikamichi	Yūko's Shortcut	
2008	岡田利規; Toshiki Okada	わたしたちに許された特別な時間の終わり; Watashitachi ni Yurusareta Tokubetsu na Jikan no Owari	The End of the Special Time Allowed to Us	
2009	安藤礼二; Reiji Ando	光の曼荼羅 日本文学論; Hikari no Mandara, Nihon Bungaku Ron	Mandala of Light: on Japanese Literature	
2010	中村文則; Fuminori Nakamura	掏摸; Suri	The Thief (tr. Satako Izumo and Stephen Coates)	
2011	星野智幸; Tomoyuki Hoshino	俺俺; Ore Ore	ME (tr. Charles De Wolf)	
2012	綿矢りさ; Risa Wataya	かわいそうだね？ Kawaisou da ne?	Isn't It a Pity?	
2013	本谷有希子; Yukiko Motoya	嵐のピクニック; Arashi no pikunikku	Picnic in the Storm	
2014	岩城けい; Kei Iwaki	さようなら、オレンジ; Sayounara, orenji	Goodbye, My Orange	
