= Masayuki Fujita =

Masayuki Fujita is an electrical engineer at the Tokyo Institute of Technology in Tokyo, Japan.

Fujita was named a Fellow of the Institute of Electrical and Electronics Engineers (IEEE) in 2016 for his contributions to passivity-based control in robotics and robust control.
