= Gen'ichirō Sunouchi =

Japanese mathematician

Gen'ichirō Sunouchi (洲之内 源一郎, Sunouchi Gen'ichirō; 29 October 1911 – 7 March 2008) was a Japanese mathematician working on Fourier series and analysis. He authored over 90 articles written in collaboration with 17 coauthors. The Sunouchi operators are named after him.

== Selected publications ==
- Sunouchi, Gen'ichirō, On the Walsh-Kaczmarz series. Proc. Amer. Math. Soc. 2, (1951). 5–11.
- Sunouchi, Gen'ichirō, Strong summability of Walsh-Fourier series. Tōhoku Math. J. (2) 16 1964 228–237.
- Sunouchi, Gen'ichirō, Notes on Fourier analysis. XVIII. Absolute summability of series with constant terms. Tōhoku Math. J. (2) 1, (1949). 57–65.
- Kaneko, Makoto; Sunouchi, Gen'ichirō, On the Littlewood-Paley and Marcinkiewicz functions in higher dimensions. Tōhoku Math. J. (2) 37 (1985), no. 3, 343–365.
