= Yasuo Tanaka (politician) =

Japanese novelist and politician

- 田中 康夫
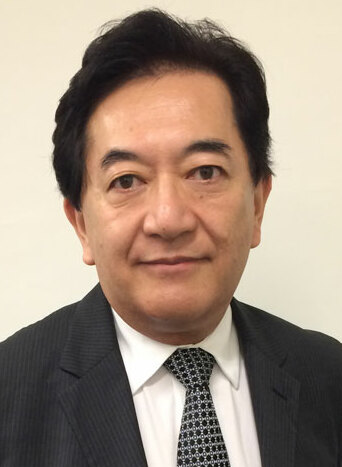
- Tanaka in 2014

Member of the House of Representatives
- In office 30 August 2009 – 16 November 2012
- Preceded by: Tetsuzo Fuyushiba
- Succeeded by: Hiromasa Nakano
- Constituency: Hyōgo 8th

Member of the House of Councillors
- In office 29 July 2007 – 18 August 2009
- Preceded by: Multi-member district
- Succeeded by: Makoto Hirayama
- Constituency: National PR

Governor of Nagano Prefecture
- In office 26 October 2000 – 31 August 2006
- Monarch: Akihito
- Preceded by: Goro Yoshimura
- Succeeded by: Jin Murai

Personal details
- Born: 12 April 1956 (age 70) Musashino, Tokyo, Japan
- Party: Innovation (since 2015)
- Other political affiliations: Independent (2000–2007); NPN (2007–2015)
- Education: Hitotsubashi University

Yasuo Tanaka (田中 康夫, Tanaka Yasuo; born 12 April 1956) is a Japanese novelist and politician. He served as the governor of Nagano Prefecture from 2000 to 2006, became president of New Party Nippon, and has been elected to Japan's legislatures.

== Early life ==
Tanaka was born in Musashino, Tokyo, and moved to Nagano at the age of 8 when his father became a professor at Shinshu University. He initially failed the university entrance exams in 1975 and spent the next year studying in Tokyo to retake them. In 1976 he entered the Faculty of Law at Hitotsubashi University. He received the Bungei Prize in 1980 for his first novel, Nantonaku, Kurisutaru, while still a student. He graduated in the same year and briefly worked for the Mobil Oil Corporation for three months before leaving to continue his career as a writer. Tanaka married after graduating from university but divorced 11 months later.

== Political career ==
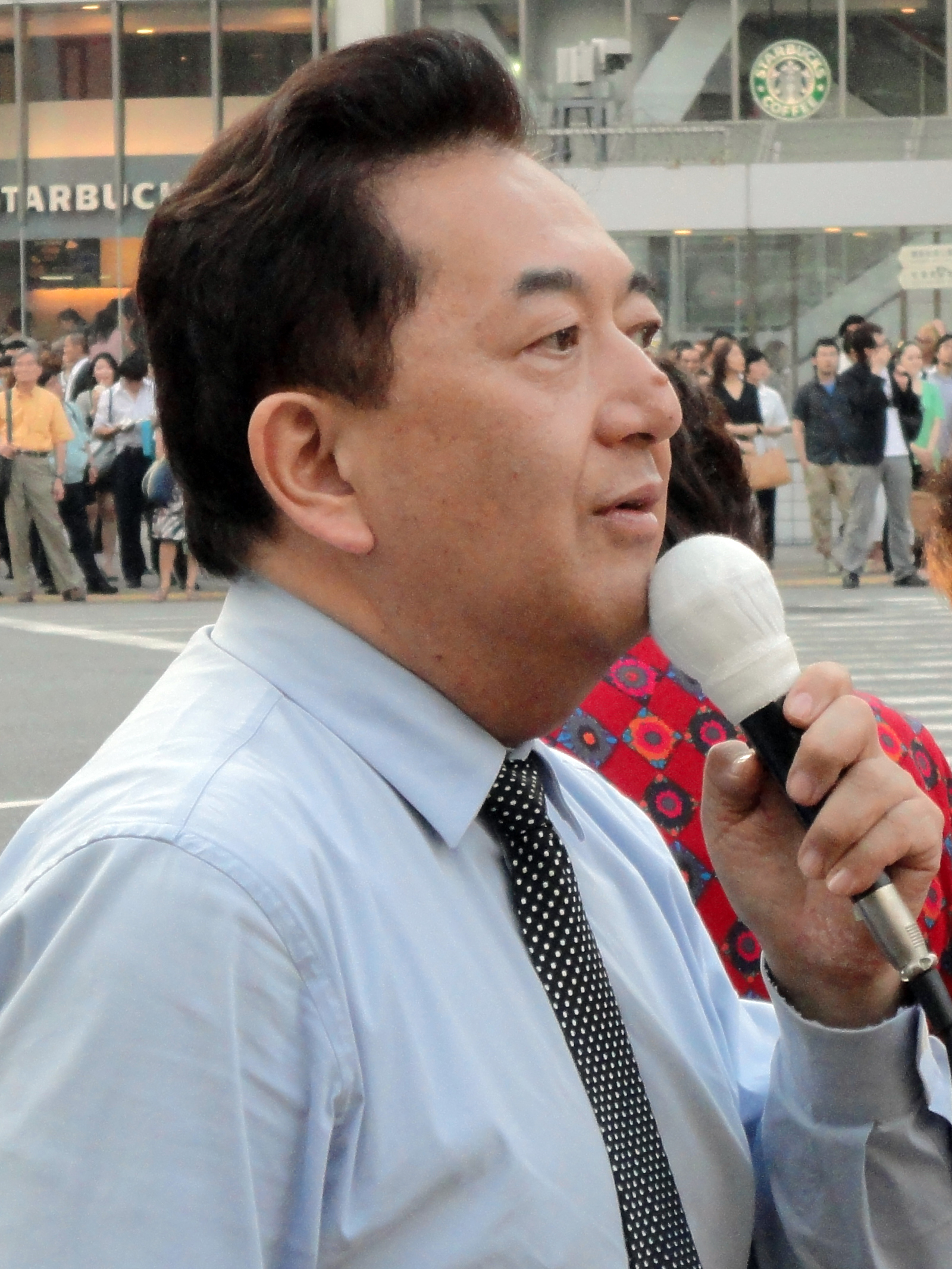
Tanaka in 2010

In 2000, Tanaka was elected governor of Nagano Prefecture, a rural prefecture in Japan, standing as an independent without the support of any major Japanese political party. Soon after, Tanaka became a focus of public attention in Japan for policies that represented a radical departure from the priorities of the Japan's bureaucratic establishment. These included his policy of halting dam building, campaigning for environmental issues and abolishing the Nagano Press Club.

These policies were designed to address ruinous public development projects that had left Nagano and many other prefectures burdened by debts. Japan is one of the most heavily dammed countries in the world with more than 3,000 dams and virtually no unobstructed rivers.

In 2002, conservative assemblymen who were upset by Tanaka's challenge to decades of pork-barrel politics forced him from office by passing a vote of no-confidence. But in the ensuing election, Tanaka made a successful comeback, thanks to overwhelming popular vote.

In August 2005, Tanaka formed the New Party Nippon with a handful of reform-minded members of the House of Representatives.

He lost his governor's post in the August 2006 election to Liberal Democratic Party opponent Jin Murai. He regained political office in the July 2007 election for the House of Councillors of the national Diet, the only successful New Party Nippon candidate in the election. In August 2009 he relinquished his seat in the House of Councillors in order to contest the Hyogo 8th district in the House of Representatives general election, in which he defeated Tetsuzo Fuyushiba, who had held the seat for 23 years. He was replaced in the House of Councillors by Makoto Hirayama, who had placed third on the party's ballot in the 2007 election.

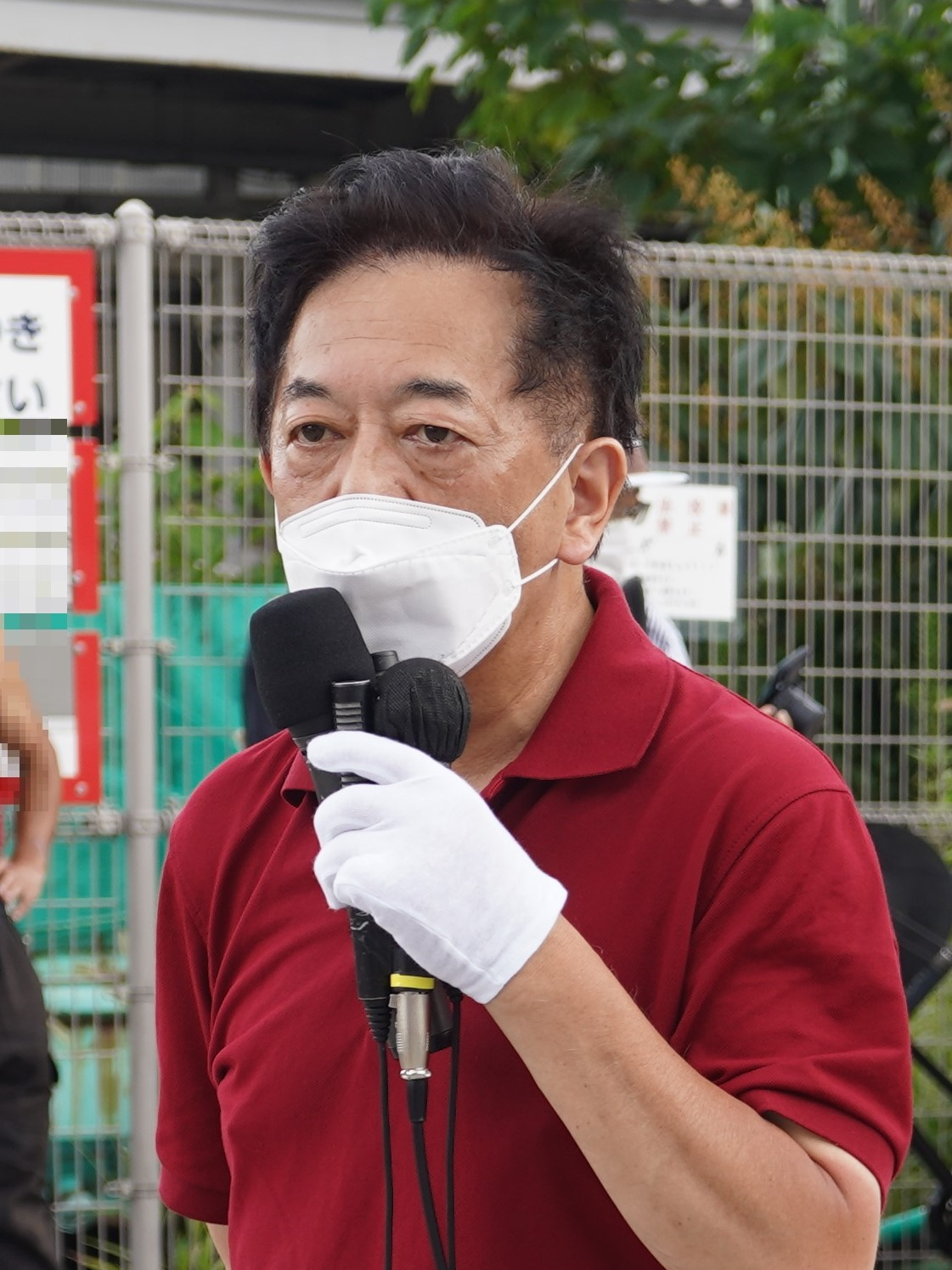
Tanaka in 2021

As president of New Party Nippon, he served in the House of Representatives of Japan in the Democratic Party and People's New Party parliamentary groups before becoming an independent (in terms of parliamentary group) in 2012. In the 2012 House of Representatives election, he lost his seat representing Hyōgo's 8th district to Kōmeitō newcomer Hiromasa Nakano – before 2009, the seat had been held by Kōmeitō's former secretary-general, Tetsuzō Fuyushiba.
