= Genichiro Takahashi =

Japanese novelist (born 1951)

- Born: January 1, 1951 (age 75); Onomichi, Hiroshima, Japan
- Writing career
- Notable awards: Gunzo Literary Award for Sayonara, Gangsters, Mishima Yukio Prize for Yuga de kansho-teki na Nippon-yakyuu, Itoh Sei Literature Award for Nihon bungaku seisui shi, Tanizaki Prize for Sayonara Christopher Robin

Genichiro Takahashi (高橋 源一郎, Takahashi Gen'ichirō; born 1 January 1951) is a Japanese novelist.

== Life and career ==
Takahashi was born in Onomichi, Hiroshima prefecture and attended the Economics Department of Yokohama National University without graduating. As a radical student, he was arrested and spent half a year in prison, which caused Takahashi to develop a form of aphasia. As part of his rehabilitation, his doctors encouraged him to start writing. Critics have compared him to Thomas Pynchon, Donald Barthelme, and Italo Calvino.

Takahashi's first novel, Sayonara, Gyangutachi (Sayonara, Gangsters), was published in 1982, and won the Gunzo Literary Award for First Novels. It has been acclaimed by critics as one of the most important works of postwar Japanese literature. It has been translated into English, French, Italian, Brazilian Portuguese and Czech.

In addition, his Yuga de kansho-teki na Nippon-yakyuu ("Japanese Baseball: Elegant and Sentimental") won the Mishima Yukio Prize in 1988, and his Nihon bungaku seisui shi (The Rise and Fall of Japanese Literature) received the Itoh Sei Literature Award.

Since April 2005, he has been a professor at the International Department of Meiji Gakuin University. Takahashi's current wife, Tanikawa Naoko and former wife Muroi Yuzuki were also both writers.

In 2012, Sayonara Christopher Robin ("Goodbye, Christopher Robin") won the Tanizaki Prize.

He is also a noted essayist, covering a diverse field of topics ranging from literary criticism to horse-racing. His essays on popular culture and current events regularly appear in the Asahi Shimbun and in English translation on their website.

== Works ==
=== Novels ===
- Sayonara, gyangutachi (さようなら、ギャングたち 'Sayonara Gangsters'), 1982, Kodansha.
  - English translation (Sayonara, Gangsters) by Michael Emmerich, 2008, Vertical.
  - Brazilian Portuguese translation Jefferson J. Teixeira, 2006, Ediouro.
  - Italian translation by Gianluca Coci, 2008, Rizzoli, 2022, Atmosphere Libri.
  - French translation by Jean-François Chaix, 2013, Books Edition.
  - Czech translation (Sbohem, Gangsteři) by Anna Cima, Igor Cima, 2021, Argo.
- Niji no achira ni: oovaa za reinbou (虹の彼方に - オーヴァー・ザ・レインボウ 'Over The Rainbow'), 1984, Chuoo Koron Shinsha.
- Jon Renon tai kaseijin (ジョン・レノン対火星人 'John Lennon vs the Martians'), 1985, Kadokawa Shoten.
- Yuga de kansho-teki na Nippon-yakyuu (優雅で感傷的な日本野球 Japanese Baseball: Elegant and Sentimental), 1988, Kawade Shobo Shinsha
- Pengin mura ni hi wa ochite (ペンギン村に陽は落ちて 'The Sun Sets in Penguin Village'), 1989, Shueisha.
- Wakusei P-13 no himitsu (惑星P-13の秘密 'The Secret of Planet P-13'), 1990, Kadokawa Shoten.
- Goosutobasutaazu (ゴーストバスターズ 'Ghostbusters'), 1997, Kodansha.
- A.da.ru.to (あ・だ・る・と 'A.D.U.L.T'), 1999, Shufu to Seikatsu-sha.
- Nihon bungaku seisui shi (日本文学盛衰史 'The Rise and Fall of Japanese Literature'), 2001, Kodansha.
- Gojira (ゴヂラ 'Godzilla'), 2001, Shinchosha.
- Kannou shousetsuka (官能小説家 'Novelist of the Senses'), 2002, Asahi Shinbun-sha.
- Itsuka souru torein ni noru hi made (いつかソウル・トレインに乗る日まで 'Until The Day We Ride the Soul Train'), 2008, Shueisha.
- Aku to tatakau (「悪」と戦う Battling 'Evil), 2010, Kawade Shobo Shinsha.
- Koisuru genpatsu (恋する原発 'A Nuclear Reactor in Love'), 2011, Kodansha.
  - French translation (La Centrale en chaleur) by Sylvain Cardonnel, 2013, Books Edition.
- Ginga tetsudo no kanata ni (銀河鉄道の彼方に 'On the Other Side of the Galactic Railway'), 2013, Shueisha.
- Bokutachi wa kono kuni wo konna fuu ni aisuru koto ni kimeta (ぼくたちはこの国をこんなふうに愛することに決めた 'We Have Decided to Love This Country in This Way'), 2017, Shueisha.

=== Short story collections ===
- Kimi ga yo wa chiyo ni hachiyo ni (君が代は千代に八千代に 'May Your Reign Last Forever and Ever'), 2002, Bungei Shunju.
- Seikou to ren'ai ni matsuwaru ikutsu no monogatari (性交と恋愛にまつわるいくつかの物語 'Some Stories on Sex and Love'), 2005, Asahi Shinbun-sha.
- Miyazawa Kenji gureetesuto hitsu (ミヤザワケンジ・グレーテストヒッツ 'Miyazawa Kenji's Greatest Hits'), 2005, Shueisha.
- Sayonara kurisutofaa robin (さよならクリストファー・ロビン 'Goodbye, Christopher Robin'), 2012, Shinchosha.

=== Selected Essay and Literary Criticism Collections ===
- Bungaku ja nai kamoshirenai shoukougun (文学じゃないかもしれない症候群 The Maybe-It's-Not-Literature Syndrome), 1992, Asahi Shinbun-sha.
- Ichioku sansenman nin no tame no shousetsu kyoushitsu (一億三千万人のための小説教室 Novel Writing Class for 130 Million People), 2002, Iwanami Shinsho.
- Nippon no shousetsu: hyakunen no kodoku (ニッポンの小説 - 百年の孤独 The Japanese Novel: One Hundred Years of Solitude), 2007, Bungei Shunju.
- Ju-san hiai de 'meibun' wo kakeru you ni naru houhou (13日間で「名文」を書けるようになる方法 How to Write a 'Famous Novel' in 13 Days), 2009, Asahi Shinbun-sha.
- "Ano hi" kara boku ga kangaeteiru "tadashisa" ni tsuite (「あの日」からぼくが考えている「正しさ」について 'On the "Correctness" I Have Been Considering Since "That Day"'), 2012, Kawade Shobo Shinsha.
- Hijouji no kotoba: shinsai no ato de (非常時のことば 震災の後で 'Language in a Time of Crisis: After the Earthquake'), 2012, Asahi Shinbun-sha.
- Kokumin no kotoba (国民のコトバ 'The People's Language'), 2013, Mainichi Shinbun-sha.
- 101 nen-me no kodoku: kibou no basho wo motomete (101年目の孤独――希望の場所を求めて '101 Years of Solitude: Seeking a Place of Hope'), 2013, Iwanami Shobo.
