= Risa Wataya =

Japanese novelist

- 綿矢 りさ
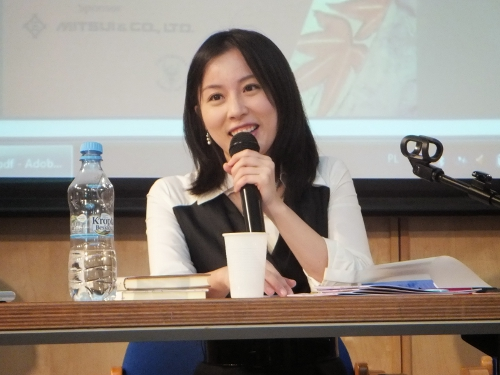
- Risa Wataya at the Embassy of Japan in Poland in 2013
- Born: February 1, 1984 (age 42); Kyoto, Japan
- Education: Waseda University
- Occupations: Novelist, writer
- Writing career
- Language: Japanese
- Notable works: Insutōru; Keritai senaka; Kawaisou da ne?
- Notable awards: Bungei Prize; Akutagawa Prize; Kenzaburo Oe Prize

Risa Wataya (綿矢 りさ, Wataya Risa; born February 1, 1984) is a female Japanese novelist from Kyoto. Her short novel Keritai senaka won the Akutagawa Prize and has sold more than a million copies. Wataya has also won the Bungei Prize and the Kenzaburo Oe Prize. Her work has been translated into German, Italian, French, Thai, Korean, and English.

== Biography ==
Wataya was born in Kyoto, Japan. Her mother was a university English teacher, and her father worked for a clothing company. At age 17, she told her parents that she was working on her university entrance exams, but she was actually writing her first novella, titled Insutōru (Install). Insutōru won the 38th Bungei Prize in 2001. It was later adapted into a 2004 film of the same name, starring Aya Ueto.

After graduating from Murasakino High School in Kyoto, Wataya attended Waseda University, where her thesis focused on the structure of Osamu Dazai's Hashire merosu (走れ、メロス Run, Melos!). In 2004, while a second-year student at Waseda, Wataya received the Akutagawa Prize for her short novel Keritai senaka ("The Back You Want to Kick"). Wataya shared the prize with Hitomi Kanehara, another young, female author. At the age of 19, Wataya became the youngest author and only the third student ever to win the Akutagawa Prize. An English version of Keritai senaka was published 12 years later under the title I Want to Kick You in the Back.

Wataya did not immediately write more novels after winning the Akutagawa Prize, but rather worked several jobs in Kyoto, including selling clothes in a department store and serving as a hotel waitress. She returned to writing with her 2007 book Yume wo ataeru (Give Me a Dream), and in 2010 her novel Katte ni furuetero (Tremble All You Want) became a best-seller in Japan. In 2017 a film adaptation of Katte ni furuetero, directed by Akiko Ohku, premiered at the Tokyo International Film Festival and won the festival's Audience Award.

Wataya moved back to Kyoto in 2011. In 2012 her novel Kawaisou da ne? ("Isn't it a pity?") won the Kenzaburo Oe Prize. Wataya announced her marriage in 2014. Her first child, a son, was born in late 2015.

She is a fan of AKB48.

== Writing style ==
Wataya's early work focused on strong female protagonists in high school settings. While her writing addresses gender and youth sexuality, media coverage of Wataya's first two books tended to portray Wataya as more conservative than Hitomi Kanehara, her contemporary and co-winner of the 130th Akutagawa Prize.

She has said that Junot Díaz, Osamu Dazai, and Haruki Murakami are some of her favorite authors.

== Recognition ==
- 2001 38th Bungei Prize
- 2004 130th Akutagawa Prize (2003下)
- 2012 Kenzaburo Oe Prize

== Film and other adaptations ==
- 2004 Insutōru (Install)
- 2017 Tremble All You Want
- 2021 Unlock Your Heart

== Bibliography ==
=== Books in Japanese ===
- インストール (Install). Kawade Shobo Shinsha Publishing Co., 2001. ISBN 4-309-01437-2
- 蹴りたい背中 (Keritai senaka, The Back I Want to Kick). Kawade Shobo Shinsha Publishing Co., 2003. ISBN 4-309-01570-0
- 夢を与える (Yume wo ataeru, To Give a Dream). Kawade Shobo Shinsha Publishing Co., 2007.ISBN 978-4309018041
- 勝手にふるえてろ (Katte ni furuetero, Tremble All You Want). Bungeishunju Ltd.,2010. ISBN 978-4-16-329640-1
- かわいそうだね？ (Kawaisou da ne?, Isn't It a Pity?) Bungeishunju Ltd.,2010. ISBN 978-4-16-380950-2
- ひらいて (Hiraite, Open) Shinchosha Publishing Co, Ltd.,2012. ISBN 978-4101266510

=== Selected work in English ===
- "from Install", trans. Katherine Lundy, Words without Borders, 2012
- I Want to Kick You in the Back, trans. Julianne Neville, One Peace Books, 2015, ISBN 9781935548881
