= Mishima Yukio Prize =

Japanese literary award

- 三島由紀夫賞 (Mishima Yukio Shō)
- Awarded for: Groundbreaking novel, criticism, poetry, or play
- Country: Japan
- Presented by: Shinchō Society for the Promotion of Literary Arts
- Reward: ¥1,000,000
- First award: 1988; 38 years ago
- Website: www.shinchosha.co.jp/prizes/mishimasho/

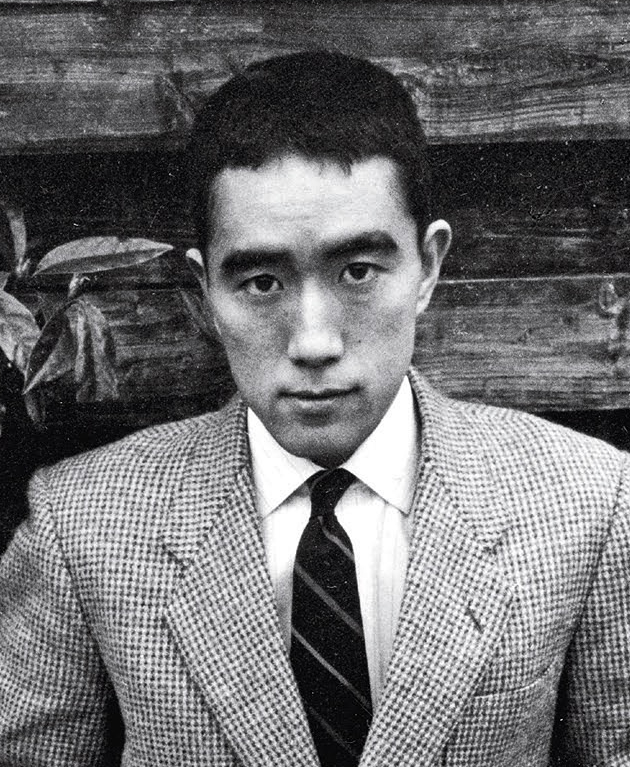
A portrait of Yukio Mishima, 1955

The Mishima Yukio Prize (三島由紀夫賞, Mishima Yukio Shō) is a Japanese literary award presented annually. It was established in 1988 in memory of author Yukio Mishima. The Mishima Yukio Prize is explicitly intended for work that "breaks new ground for the future of literature," and prize winners tend to be more controversial and experimental than winners of the more traditional Akutagawa Prize. It is awarded in the same annual ceremony as the Yamamoto Shūgorō Prize, which was established by the same sponsor in 1988 to recognize popular writing and genre fiction.

== Winners ==
Shinchosha, the award's sponsor, maintains an official archive of award nominee and recipient information.

	Year	Winner	Winning entry
1	1988	Genichiro Takahashi	Yūga de Kanshōteki na Nippon Yakyū (優雅で感傷的な日本野球)
2	1989	Akira Ooka	Tasogare no Sutōmu Shīdingu [Storm Seeding] (黄昏のストーム・シーディング)
3	1990	Jugi Hisama	Seikimatsu Geigeiki (世紀末鯨鯢記)
4	1991	Kazumi Saeki	A Loose Boy (ア・ルース・ボーイ, A Rūsu Bōi)
5	1992	no applicable work	
6	1993	Chokitsu Kurumatani	Shiotsubo no Saji (塩壺の匙)
6	1993	Kazuya Fukuda	Nihon no kakyō (日本の家郷)
7	1994	Yoriko Shono	Nihyakkaiki (二百回忌)
8	1995	Masayo Yamamoto	Midori-iro no Nigotta Ocha Arui wa Kōfuku no Sampo-michi (緑色の濁ったお茶あるいは幸福の散歩道)
9	1996	Hisaki Matsuura	Orikuchi Shinobu Ron (折口信夫論)
10	1997	Satoru Higuchi	Sangen no Yūwaku: Kindai Nihon Seishin-shi Oboe-gaki (三絃の誘惑 近代日本精神史覚え書)
11	1998	Kyoji Kobayashi	Kabuki no Hi (カブキの日)
12	1999	Suzuki Seigō	Rokkun rōru [Rock’n’Roll] mishin (ロックンロールミシン)
12	1999	Toshiyuki Horie	Oparaban (おぱらばん)
13	2000	Tomoyuki Hoshino	“Wake Up,” Sings the Mermaid (目覚めよと人魚は歌う, Mezameyo to Ningyo wa Utau)
14	2001	Shinji Aoyama	EUREKA (Novel)
14	2001	Masaya Nakahara	Bouquets of Flowers Everywhere (あらゆる場所に花束が……, Arayuru Basho ni Hanataba ga......)
15	2002	Masatsugu Ono	Boat on a Choppy Bay (にぎやかな湾に背負われた船, Nigiyaka na Wan ni Seowareta Fune)
16	2003	Otaro Maijo	Asura Girl (阿修羅ガール, Ashura Gāru)
17	2004	Toshihiko Yahagi	La-la-la Child of Science (ららら科學の子, Rarara Kagaku no Ko)
18	2005	Maki Kashimada	Love at 6,000 Degrees Celsius (六〇〇〇度の愛, Rokusendo no Ai)
19	2006	Hideo Furukawa	LOVE
20	2007	Yuya Sato	1000 Novels and Backbeard (1000の小説とバックベアード, Sen no Shōsetsu to Bakkubeādo)
21	2008	Shinya Tanaka	The Broken Chain (切れた鎖, Kireta Kusari)
22	2009	Shiro Maeda	Merman in Summer Waters (夏の水の半魚人, Natsu no Mizu no Hangyojin)
23	2010	Hiroki Azuma	Quantum Families (クォンタム・ファミリーズ, Kwontamu Famirīzu)
24	2011	Natsuko Imamura	Amiko Here (こちらあみ子, Kochira Amiko)
25	2012	Jungo Aoki	Watashi no Inai Kōkō (私のいない高校)
26	2013	Sayaka Murata	Of Bones, of Body Heat, of Whitening City (しろいろの街の、その骨の体温の, Shiro-iro no Machi no, Sono Hone no Taion no)
27	2014	Yukiko Motoya	Jibun o Suki ni Naru Hōhō (自分を好きになる方法)
28	2015	Takahiro Ueda	My One True Love (私の恋人, Watashi no koibito)
29	2016	Shigehiko Hasumi	Hakushaku fujin (伯爵夫人)
30	2017	Yusuke Miyauchi	Garden of Kabul (カブールの園, Kabul no Sono)
31	2018	Natsuki Koyata	Mugen no Gen (無限の玄)
32	2019	Michiko Mikuni	Ikarekoro (いかれころ)
33	2020	Rin Usami	Kaka (かか)
34	2021	Yusuke Norishiro	Tabi Suru Renshū (旅する練習)
35	2022	Toshiki Okada	Burokkorī Reboryūshon (ブロッコリー・レボリューション)
36	2023	Aki Asahina	Shokubutsu Shōjo (植物少女)
37	2024	Stephanie Kanto Ota	Midori Iseki (みどりいせき)

== Members of the selection committee ==
- From 1st to 4th: Kenzaburō Ōe, Jun Eto, Kenji Nakagami, Yasutaka Tsutsui, Teru Miyamoto
- From 5th to 8th: Shintaro Ishihara, Jun Eto, Genichiro Takahashi, Yasutaka Tsutsui, Teru Miyamoto
- From 9th to 12th: So Aono, Shitaro Ishihara, Jun Eto, Yasutaka Tsutsui, Teru Miyamoto
- From 13th to 20th: Masahiko Shimada, Nobuko Takagi, Yasutaka Tsutsui, Kazuya Fukuda, Teru Miyamoto
- From 21st to 24th: Yōko Ogawa, Hiromi Kawakami, Noboru Tsujihara, Keiichiro Hirano, Ko Machida
- Current members: Hiromi Kawakami, Kaoru Takamura, Noboru Tsujihara, Keiichiro Hirano, Ko Machida

== Available in English translation ==
=== Nominees ===
- 1988 (1st) - Banana Yoshimoto, Kitchen
- 1994 (7th) - Rieko Matsuura, The Apprenticeship of Big Toe P (trans. Michael Emmerich, Kodansha USA, 2010)
- 2003 (16th) - Novala Takemoto, Emily (trans. Misa Dikengil Lindberg, Shueisha English Edition, 2013)

=== Winners ===
- 2003 (16th) - Otaro Maijo, Asura Girl (trans. Stephen Snyder, Haikasoru, 2014, ISBN 9781421581293)

== See also ==
- List of Japanese literary awards
