= Three Tales (film) =

1960 Japanese anime film

新しい動画 3つのはなし (Mittsu no Hanashi)
- Genre: Fantasy
- Anime television film
- Directed by: Keiko Kozonoe
- Original network: NHK
- Released: January 15, 1960
- Runtime: 30 minutes

Three Tales (新しい動画 3つのはなし, Mittsu no Hanashi) was a black and white Japanese anime direct-to-TV short film aired in 1960. It was thought to be the first domestic anime ever televised until the discovery of Mole's Adventure.

== Background ==
The show was an experimental anthology broadcast on the NHK channel. It was divided into 3 parts featuring individual short fairy tales. The first part of the show titled "The Third Plate" is technically the first anime segment ever televised. In total, the show was 30 minutes long. Though it is questionable as to how widespread the anime actually was, since NHK was only broadcasting to 866 TV sets as of 1953. There is no known estimate as to how much their infrastructure scaled just 7 years later. Though the best evidence pointing to the anime as being black and white comes from the NHK station record, which indicated they did not make their first analog color broadcast until September 10, 1960, at 8:55 pm 9 months later in Tokyo and Osaka.

== Story ==
The story is an anthology of 3 separate fairy tales.

Story	Japanese Name	English Name	Original Story by
Story 1	第三の皿	The Third Plate	Hirosuke Hamada
Story 2	オッペルと象	Oppel and the Elephant	Kenji Miyazawa
Story 3	眠い町	Sleepy Town	Mimei Ogawa

== Staff ==
Kenji Miyazawa had already died when the show saw his story turned into an anime, even Mia Ogawa would also die just 1 year after the show's first broadcast in 1961.

Function	Japanese Name	English Name	Alternate English Name
Director, Supervisor	小薗江圭子	Keiko Osonoe	
Director, Supervisor	中原収一	Shûichi Nakahara	
Director, Supervisor	和田誠	Makoto Wada	
Original Story Author	浜田広介	Hirosuke Hamada	
Original Story Author	宮沢賢治	Kenji Miyazawa	
Original Story Author	小川未明	Mimei Ogawa	Bimei Ogawa
