= Noma Literary Prize =

Japanese literary award

- Awarded for: Literary award
- Country: Japan
- Presented by: Noma Cultural Foundation
- First award: 1941; 85 years ago
- Website: https://www.kodansha.co.jp/award/noma_b.html

The Noma Literary Prize (Noma Bungei Shō) was established in 1941 by the Noma Service Association (Noma Hōkō Kai) in accordance with the last wishes of Seiji Noma (1878–1938), founder and first president of the Kodansha publishing company. It is awarded by the Noma Cultural Foundation, the largest single shareholder in Kodansha. The Noma Literary Prize has been awarded annually to an outstanding new work published in Japan between October and the following September. The Noma Prize includes a commemorative plaque and a cash award of 3 million yen. It is one in a series of Noma Prizes.

== Sponsorship Prize (1941–1946) ==
Year	Author	Work
1941	Sasamoto Tora	Aizu Shikon (会津士魂)
1942	Yamaoka Sōhachi; Muneta Hiroshi; Yamate Kiichirō; Hamada Hirosuke	Kaitei Senki (海底戦記), Senkan dōjōki (潜艦同乗記); Taijishō (台児荘); Kazan to Chōei (崋山と長英) —
1943	Ōbayashi Kiyoshi	Shōnai Shizoku (庄内士族)
1944	Dan Kazuo	Tenmei (天明)
1946	Hōjō Makoto	Kangiku (寒菊) and Ichinen (一年)

== Noma Literary Prize (1941–present) ==
An archive of past prize winners is maintained by Kodansha.

Year	Author	Work
1941	Mayama Seika	
1942	no award	
1943	Kōda Rohan	
1944	no award	
1946	Mimei Ogawa	
1953	Fumio Niwa	Hebi to hato (蛇と鳩)
1954	Yasunari Kawabata	Yama no oto (山の音)
1955	no award	
1956	Shigeru Tonomura	Ikada (筏)
1957	Fumiko Enchi	Onnazaka (女坂)
1957	Chiyo Uno	Ohan (おはん)
1958	Hideo Kobayashi	Kindai kaiga (近代絵画)
1959	Saisei Murō	Kagerou no nikki ibun (かげろふの日記遺文)
1960	Shōtarō Yasuoka	Umibe no kōkei (海辺の光景)
1960	Tomie Ōhara	En to iu onna (婉という女)
1961	Yasushi Inoue	Yodo dono no nikki (淀どの日記)
1962	Kazuo Ozaki	Maboroshi no ki (まぼろしの記)
1963	Kazuo Hirotsu	Nengetsu no ashioto (年月のあしおと)
1964	Gishū Nakayama	Shoan (咲庵)
1964	Jun Takami	Shi no fuchi yori (死の淵より)
1965	Tatsuo Nagai	Ikko sono hoka (一個)
1966	Ibuse Masuji	Kuroi Ame (黒い雨) Black Rain
1967	Mitsuo Nakamura	Nise no gūzō (贋の偶像)
1967	Seiichi Funabashi	Sukina onna no munakazari (好きな女の胸飾り)
1968	Tetsutarō Kawakami	Yoshida Shōin (吉田松陰)
1969	Shigeharu Nakano	Kōotsuheitei (甲乙丙丁)
1970	Ken'ichi Yoshida	Yōroppa no seikimatsu (ヨオロッパの世紀末)
1970	Jun Etō	Sōseki to sono jidai (漱石とその時代)
1971	Junzō Shōno	Eawase (絵合せ)
1972	Ineko Sata	Juei (樹影)
1973	Kenzaburō Ōe	Kōzui wa waga tamashii ni oyobi (洪水はわが魂に及び)
1974	Shōhei Ōoka	Nakahara Chūya (中原中也)
1975	Ken Hirano	Samazama na seishun (さまざまな青春)
1975	Kazuo Ozaki	Ano hi kono hi (あの日この日)
1976	Taijun Takeda	Memai no suru sanpo (目まいのする散歩)
1976	Tetsuo Miura	Kenjū to jūgo no tampen (拳銃と十五の短篇)
1977	Kenzō Nakajima	Kaisō no bungaku (回想の文学)
1978	Junnosuke Yoshiyuki	Yūgure made (夕暮まで)
1979	Shizuo Fujieda	Kanashii dake (悲しいだけ)
1980	Shūsaku Endō	The Samurai (侍)
1981	Kenkichi Yamamoto	Inochi to katachi (いのちとかたち)
1982	Nobuo Kojima	Wakareru riyū (別れる理由)
1983	Fumio Niwa	Ren'nyo (蓮如)
1984	no award	
1985	Shimao Toshio	Gyoraitei gakusei (魚雷艇学生)
1985	Maruya Saiichi	Chūshingura towa nanika (忠臣蔵とは何か)
1986	Ueda Miyoji	Shimaki Akahiko (島木赤彦)
1986	Minako Oba	Naku tori no (啼く鳥の)
1987	Atsushi Mori	Ware yuku mono no gotoku (われ逝くもののごとく)
1988	Yasuoka Shōtarō	Boku no shōwashi (僕の昭和史)
1989	Inoue Yasushi	Kōshi (孔子)
1990	Kiichi Sasaki	Watashi no Chēhofu (私のチェーホフ)
1991	Taeko Kōno	Miira tori ryookitan (みいら採り猟奇譚)
1992	Hiroshi Sakagami	Denen fukei (田園風景)
1993	Keizō Hino	Taifu no me (台風の眼)
1994	Hiroyuki Agawa	Shiga Naoya (志賀直哉)
1994	Lee Hoesung	Hyakunen no tabibito tachi (百年の旅人たち)
1995	no award	
1996	Shun Akiyama	Nobunaga (信長)
1997	Hideo Takubo	Kodamashu (木霊集)
1997	Tomioka Taeko	Hiberuni ato kiko (ひべるにあ島紀行)
1998	Yūko Tsushima	Hinoyama, yamazaruki (火の山―山猿記)
1999	Takayuki Kiyooka	Maronie no hana ga itta (マロニエの花が言った)
2000	Kyōko Hayashi	Nagai jikan o kaketa ningen no keiken (長い時間をかけた人間の経験)
2001	Jakucho Setouchi	Basho (場所)
2002	Yuichi Takai	Toki no ushio (時の潮)
2003	Hiroko Takenishi	Zōtō no Uta (贈答のうた)
2004	Takashi Tsujii	Chichi no Shōzō (父の肖像)
2005	Ryū Murakami	Hanto wo deyo (半島を出よ)
2006	Senji Kuroi	Ichijitsu yume no satsu (一日 夢の柵)
2007	Kazumi Saeki	Norge (ノルゲ Norge)
2008	Kō Machida	Yadoya Meguri (宿屋めぐり)
2009	Hikaru Okuizumi	Jingi gunkan Kashihara satsujinjiken (神器 軍艦『橿原』殺人事件)
2010	Kiyoko Murata	Furusato no waga ie'' (故郷のわが家)
2011	Yōko Tawada	Yuki no renshūsei (雪の練習生)
2012	Amy Yamada	Jentoruman (ジェントルマン, Gentleman)
2013	Hosaka Kazushi	Mimei no toso (未明の闘争)
2014	Yoriko Shono	Mitōbyōki: kōgenbyō "kongōsei ketsugō soshikibyō" no (未闘病記――膠原病、「混合性結合組織病」の)
2015	Mayumi Nagano	Meido ari (冥途あり)
2016	Toshiyuki Horie	Sono sugata no keshikata (その姿の消し方)
2017	Kaoru Takamura	Tsuchi no ki (土の記)
2018	Osamu Hashimoto	Kusanagi no tsurugi (草薙の剣)
2019	Hisaki Matsuura	Ningai (人外)
2020	Yōko Ogawa	Kobako (小箱)
2021	Hideo Levy	Tenro (天路)
2022	Rieko Matsuura	Hikari Bunshū (ヒカリ文集)
2023	Hiromi Kawakami	Koi wa hakanai, arui wa, pūru no soko no sutēki (恋ははかない、あるいは、プールの底のステーキ)
2024	Fuminori Nakamura	Retsu (列)
2025	Sayaka Murata	Sekai99 (世界99)

== Noma Literary New Face Prize (1979–present) ==
An archive of past prize winners is maintained by Kodansha.

Year	Author	Work
1979	Tsushima Yūko	Hikari no ryōbun (光の領分)
1980	Tatematsu Wahei	Enrai (遠雷)
1981	Murakami Ryū	Coinlocker Babys (コインロッカー・ベイビーズ, Koinrokkā beibīzu)
1981	Miyauchi Katsusuke	Kin’iro no zō (金色の象)
1982	Murakami Haruki	Hitsuji o meguru bōken (羊をめぐる冒険) tr. A Wild Sheep Chase
1983	Otsuji Katsuhiko	Yukino (雪野)
1984	Aono Sō	Onna kara no koe (女からの声)
1984	Shimada Masahiko	Muyū ōkoku no tame no ongaku (夢遊王国のための音楽)
1985	Nakazawa Kei	Suiheisen ue nite (水平線上にて)
1985	Masuda Mizuko	Suiheisen ue nite (水平線上にて) Jiyū jikan (自由時間)
1986	Iwasaka Keiko	Novalis no inyō (ノヴァーリスの引用)
1986	Hikari Agata	Shizuka ni watasu kogane no yubiwa (しずかにわたすこがねのゆびわ)
1987	Arai Man	Vexation (ヴェクサシオン, Vekusashion)
1988	Yoshimeki Hiruhiko	Louisiana kuiuchi (ルイジアナ杭打ち, Ruijiana)
1989	Ii Naoyuki	Sashite jūyōde nai ichinichi (さして重要でない一日)
1990	Saeki Kazumi	Short Circuit (ショート・サーキット, Shōto sākitto)
1991	Shōno Yoriko	Nanimo shite nai (なにもしてない)
1992	Lībi Hideo (Ian Hideo Levy)	Seijōki no kikoenai heya (星条旗の聞こえない部屋)
1993	Okuizumi Hikaru	Novalis no inyō (ノヴァーリスの引用)
1993	Hosaka Kazushi	Kusa no ue no chōshoku (草の上の朝食)
1994	Takeno Masato	Watashi no jijoden zempen (私の自叙伝前篇)
1995	Satō Yōjirō	Geshi matsuri (夏至祭)
1995	Mizumura Minae	Shishōsetsu (私小説)
1996	Kakuta Mitsuyo	Madoromu yoru no UFO (まどろむ夜のＵＦＯ)
1996	Yū Miri	Full House (フルハウス, Furuhausu)
1997	Machida Kō	Kussun daikoku (くっすん大黒)
1998	Fujino Chiya	Oshaberi kaidan (おしゃべり怪談)
1999	Abe Kazushige	Mujō no sekai (無情の世界)
1999	Itō Hiromi	La Niña (ラニーニャ, Ranīnya)
2000	Akasaka Mari	Muse (ミューズ, myūzu)
2000	Okazaki Yoshihisa	Rakutenya (楽天屋)
2001	Shimizu Hiroko	Chijiminda ai (縮んだ愛)
2001	Dōgaki Sonoe	Veracruz (ベラクルス, Berakurusu)
2002	Sagawa Mitusharu	Chijiminda ai (縮んだ愛)
2002	Wakai Sū	Umiuma no josō (海馬の助走)
2003	Shimamoto Rio	Little by little (リトル・バイ・リトル, Ritoru bai ritoru)
2003	Hoshino Tomoyuki	Fantasista (ファンタジスタ, Fantajisuta)
2004	Nakamura Kō	Guruguru mawaru suberidai (ぐるぐるまわるすべり台)
2004	Nakamura Fuminori	Shakō (遮光)
2005	Aoki Jungo	Pikarudi no sando (ピカルディーの三度
2005	Hirata Toshiko	Futarinori (二人乗り)
2006	Nakahara Masaya	Namo naki kojitachi no haka (名もなき孤児たちの墓)
2007	Kashimada Maki	Pikarudi no sando (ピカルディーの三度)
2007	Nishimura Kenta	Ankyo no yado (暗渠の宿)
2008	Tsumura Kikuko	Music bless you!! (ミュージック・ブレス・ユー!!, myūjikku buresu yū)
2009	Murata Sayaka	Gin’iro no uta (ギンイロノウタ)
2010	Enjō Tō	Uyūshitan (烏有此譚)
2010	Shibasaki Tomoka	Netemo sametemo (寝ても覚めても)
2011	Yukiko Motoya	Nurui doku (ぬるい毒)
2012	Hiwa Satoko	Rahō yonsennenki (螺法四千年記)
2012	Yamashita Sumito	Midori no saru (緑のさる)
2013	Itō Seikō	Sōzō rajio (想像ラジオ)
2014	Matsunami Tarō	L I F E
2015	Takiguchi Yūshō	Ai to jinsei (愛と人生)
2015	Furukawa Hideo	Onnatachi sanbyakunin no uragiri no sho (女たち三百人の裏切りの書)
2016	Inui Akito	Noroi otoko: Haiyū Kameoka Takuji (のろい男 俳優・亀岡拓次)
2017	Imamura Natsuko	Hoshi no ko (星のこ)
2017	Takahashi Hiroki	Sande pipuru (日曜日の人々(サンデー・ピープル), Sunday People)
2018	Kaoru Kaneko	Futago wa roba ni mataga tte (双子は驢馬に跨がって)
2018	Yusuke Noriyo	Honmono no dokusho-ka (本物の読書家)
2019	Li Kotomi	Itsutsu kazoereba mikazuki ga (五つ数えれば三日月が)
2020	Lee Yongduk	Anata ga watashi o takeyari de tsuki korosu mae ni (あなたが私を竹槍で突き殺す前に)
2021	Seiko Idokawa	Koko wa totemo hayai kawa (ここはとても速い川)
2022	Ryohei Machiya	Hon'no kodomo (ほんのこども)
2023	Akira Asahina	Anata no moeru hidarite de (あなたの燃える左手で)
2023	Rie Kudan	Shi o kaku uma (文學界)
2024	Kohei Toyonaga	Chichi nu hai ya, unma nu hai (月ぬ走いや、馬ぬ走い)

== Noma Children's Literature Prize (1963–present) ==
Year	Author	Work
1963	Ishimori Nobuo	Ban no miyage hanashi (バンのみやげ話)
1964	Matsutani Miyoko and Shōno Eiji	chisai momo-chan (ちいさいモモちゃん) and Hoshi no bokujō (星の牧場)
1965	Inui Tomiko	Umineko no sora (うみねこの空)
1966	Fukuda Kiyoto	Aki no medama (秋の目玉)
1967	Satō Satoru and Kagawa Shigeru	Obāsan no hikōki (おばあさんのひこうき) and Setoro no umi (セトロの海)
1968	Mado Michio	Tempura piriri (てんぷらぴりぴり)
1969	Imanishi Sukeyuki; Miyawaki Toshio	Uraue no tabinintachi ?? (浦上の旅人たち); Yama no ongoku monogatari (山のおんごく物語)
1970	Iwasaki Kyōko	Koi no iru mura (鯉のいる村)
1971	Tsuchiya Yukio	Tōkyōkko monogatari (東京っ子物語)
1972	Kitabatake Yao	Oni o kau goro (鬼を飼うゴロ)
1973	Andō Mikio; Yoda Junichi	Denden mushi no keiba (でんでんむしの競馬) and Yayuki yamayuki?? (野ゆき山ゆき)
1974	Tsubota Jōji	Nezumi no ibiki (ねずみのいびき)
1975	Koide Shōgo	Jinta no oto (ジンタの音)
1976	Nonagase Masao	Chisana boku no ie (小さなぼくの家)
1977	Imae Yoshitomo; Shōgenji Haruko	Oniki (兄貴); Yuki bokko monogatari (雪ぼっこ物語)
1978	Kawamura Takashi	Yama e iku ken (山へいく牛)
1979	Kanzawa Toshiko and Hiroyama Eizō	Inai inai baaya (いないいないばあや)
1980	Nagasaki Gen'nosuke and Akasaka Miyoshi; Sakata Hiroo	Wasureta shima e (忘れられた島へ) and Dorachii chan no boken (ドラジイちゃんの冒険)
1981	Maekawa Yasuo and Ōda Daihachi	Wakai sōna jidōusha no hanashi (かわいそうな自動車の話)
1982	Awa Naoko and Ajito Keiko	Tooi nobara no mura (遠い野ばらの村)
1983	Saitō Atsuo and Masayuki	Gamba to Kawauso no bōken (ガンバとカワウソの冒険)
1984	Miki Taku and Sugiura Hanmo; Takezaki Yūhi and Kobayashi Yoshi	Pota pota (ぽたぽた) and Nigedashita heitai (にげだした兵隊)
1985	Kadono Eiko and Hayashi Akiko	Majo no takkyūbin (魔女の宅急便) Kiki's Delivery Service
1986	Sueyoshi Akiko and Satoshi Nakachie?	Mama no kiiroi kozō (ママの黄色い子象)
1987	Horiuchi Sumiko; Miwa Hiroko and Furiyaka Yoko	Rubī iro no tabi (ルビー色の旅); Bokura no natsu wa yamagoya de (ぼくらの夏は山小屋で)
1988	Tanikawa Shuntarō	Hadaka Tanikawa Shuntarō shishū (はだか 谷川俊太郎詩集)
1989	Miwa Hiroko and Kuroi Ken? Aman Kimiko and Nishimaki Kayako	Papa-san no niwa (パパさんの庭); Okko-chan to tantan usagi (おっこちゃんとタンタンうさぎ)
1990	Ōishi Makoto and Ishizaki Sumiko; Muranaka Rie	Nemurenaiko (眠れない子) and Onei-chan (おねいちゃん)
1991	Imamura Ashiko and Itō Masamichi; Mori Tadaaki and Fujikawa Hideyuki	Kagari-chan (かがりちゃん) and Horn-misaki made (ホーン岬まで, Hōn-misaki made)
1992	Matsutani Miyoko and Ise Hideko; Yamashita Haruo and Uno Akira	Akane-chan no namida no umi (アカネちゃんのなみだの海) and Kamome no ie (カモメの家)
1993	Yamanaka Hisashi and Hotta Akio	Tonderojii chan (とんでろじいちゃん)
1994	Gotō Ryūji and Tanaka Makiko	Yashin aratamezu - Hitakami kokuden (野心あらためず・日高見国伝)
1995	Okada Jun	Kosoado no mori no monogatari (こそあどの森の物語 1・2・3)
1996	Moriyama Miyako and Odagiri Akira	Maneya no oiraryo nekodōchū (まねやのオイラ旅ねこ道中)
1997	Asano Atsuko and Satō Makiko	Batterī (バッテリー)
1998	Mori Eto	Tsuki no fune (つきのふね)
1999	Tatsumiya Shō and Azuma Itsuko	Tsukikami no suberu mori (月神の統べる森で)
2000	Masumasa Moto and Maekawa Kazuo	Zukkoke no bakku to za fyucha (ズッコケ三人組のバック・トゥ・ザ・フューチャー)
2001	Hanagata Mitsuru	Girigiri toraianguru (ぎりぎりトライアングル)
2002	Soya Kiyoshi	Garasu no uma (ガラスのうま)
2003	Itō Hiroshi	Osaru no mori (おさるのもり)
2004	Uehashi Nahoko	Kitsune fue no kanata (狐笛のかなた)
2005	Yoshibashi Michio	Namakura (なまくら)
2006	Yatsuka Sumiko	Watashi no sukina hito(わたしの, 好きな人)
2007	Yazuki Michiko	Shizukana Hibi (しずかな日々)
2008	Kudō Naoko	Noharauta V (のはらうたＶ)
2009	Nakagawa Chihirō	Karin-chan to jūgonin no ohina-sama (かりんちゃんと十五人のおひなさま)
2010	Ichikawa Nobuko	Kinō no yoru, otōsan ga osoku kaeta, sono wake wa ... (きのうの夜、おとうさんがおそく帰った、そのわけは……)

== Noma Children's Literature New Face Prize ==
This prize was last awarded in 1998.

- 09 1971 — Rie Yoshiyuki for Mahōtsukai no kushan neko (Sneezing Cat, a Magician).
- 33 1995 — Eto Mori for Uchu no Minashigo
- 34 1996 — Nahoko Uehashi for Moribito: Guardian of the Spirit

== See also ==
- Noma Prize
- Noma Literacy Prize
- Noma Award for Publishing in Africa
- Noma Concours for Picture Book Illustrations
