= Life Ceremony =

2019 short story collection by Sayaka Murata

- Author: Sayaka Murata
- Original title: '生命式 (Seimeishiki)'
- Publisher: Kawade Shobo Shinsha (Japanese); Grove Atlantic, Granta Books (English)
- Publication date: October 16, 2019 (Japan); July 5, 2022 (United States, Canada); May 4, 2023 (United Kingdom)
- Publication place: Japan
- Pages: 272 (Japanese); 256 (English, United States & Canada); 272 (English, United Kingdom)
- ISBN: 978-4309028309
- Preceded by: Earthlings (地球星人, Chikyūseijin)
- Followed by: Changeability (変半身, Henhanshin)

Life Ceremony (Japanese: 生命式, Hepburn: Seimeishiki; lit. 'Life Ceremony') is a 2019 short story collection by Japanese writer Sayaka Murata, published by Kawade Shobō Shinsha. Its twelve included stories have been described as strange, surreal, humorous, and grotesque. In 2022, an English translation by Ginny Tapley Takemori was published by Grove Atlantic in the United States and Canada. Granta Books published Takemori's translation in the United Kingdom in 2023.

== Stories ==
| Title | Original publication, if any (Japanese) | Original publication, if any (English) |
|---|---|---|
| 素敵な素材 ("A First-Rate Material") | 早稲田文学 (Waseda Bungaku) | Freeman's: The Future of New Writing, tr. Ginny Tapley Takemori |
| 素晴らしい食卓 ("A Magnificent Spread") | モンキー (MONKEY) | |
| 夏の夜の口付け ("A Summer Night's Kiss") | | Astra Magazine, tr. Ginny Tapley Takemori |
| 二人家族 ("Two's Family") | 花椿 (Hanatsubaki Magazine) | |
| 大きな星の時間 ("The Time of the Large Star") | おやすみ王子 (Goodnight Prince) | |
| ポチ ("Poochie") | | |
| 生命式 ("Life Ceremony") | 新潮 (Shinchō) | |
| 魔法のからだ ("Body Magic") | メイビー! (Maybe!) | |
| かぜのこいびと ("Lover on the Breeze") | 早稲田文学 記録増刊 震災とフィクションの“距離” (Waseda Bungaku, Special Issue: The Distance Between Earthquake and Fiction) | |
| パズル ("Puzzle") | 早稲田文学 (Waseda Bungaku) | |
| 街を食べる ("Eating the City") | 新潮 (Shinchō) | |
| 孵化 ("Hatchling") | 小説トリッパー (Shosetsu Tripper) | |

== Critical reception ==
In a starred review, Kirkus Reviews called the book "Beautiful, disturbing, and thought-provoking".

Dwight Garner, writing for The New York Times, called Murata's prose "deadpan, as clear as cellophane, and has the tidiness of a bento box" and lauded Takemori's translation as "so cool you could chill a bottle of wine with it." The Asian Review of Books pointed out how Murata's short stories excelled in defamiliarizing cultural norms that "don't make as much sense as people would like to think they do." The Financial Times wrote that "Murata’s skill is in turning round the world so that the abnormal, uncivil or even savage paths appear — if momentarily — to make sense" while also lauding Takemori's translation for its "spare and dreamlike" rendering of Murata's prose. Kathleen Rooney, in LIBER: A Feminist Review, said "the stories’ haunting premises linger in the mind." Cha: An Asian Literary Journal called it "disturbing and provocative".

The Big Issue, calling the book a "mixed bag", noted that Murata's writing worked best in longer pieces, such as longer short stories like "A First-Rate Material" or even her novellas, while sometimes falling flat in shorter, more conceit-driven pieces.
