= Tomie (name) =

Tomie (富江, 富枝, とみえ) is both a surname and a Japanese feminine given name. Notable people with the name include:

== Surname ==
- Toshinao Tomie (富江 利直, 1910 – death date unknown), Japanese Middle-distance running
- Shin-ichiro Tomie (冨江 慎一郎, born 1961), Japanese game director, writer of Spike Chunsoft's affiliation

== Given name ==
- Tomie Arai (born 1949), Japanese American artist and community activist
- Tomie Edano (枝野 とみえ), former female international table tennis from Japan
- Tomie Kataoka (片岡 富枝, born 1944), Japanese actress and voice actress
- Tomie Kono Knudsen (1929 – 1998), a Tenrikyo minister
- Tomie Nishimura (born 1933), former international table tennis player from Japan
- Tomie Ohtake (大竹 富江, 1913 – 2015), Japanese-Brazilian visual artist
- Tomie Ōhara (大原 富枝, 1912 – 2000), Japanese novelist

== Fictional Character(s) ==
- Tomie Kawakami, a fictional character from Tomie by Junji Ito
