= Yoko Tawada =

Japanese writer (born 1960)

Yōko Tawada
- 多和田葉子
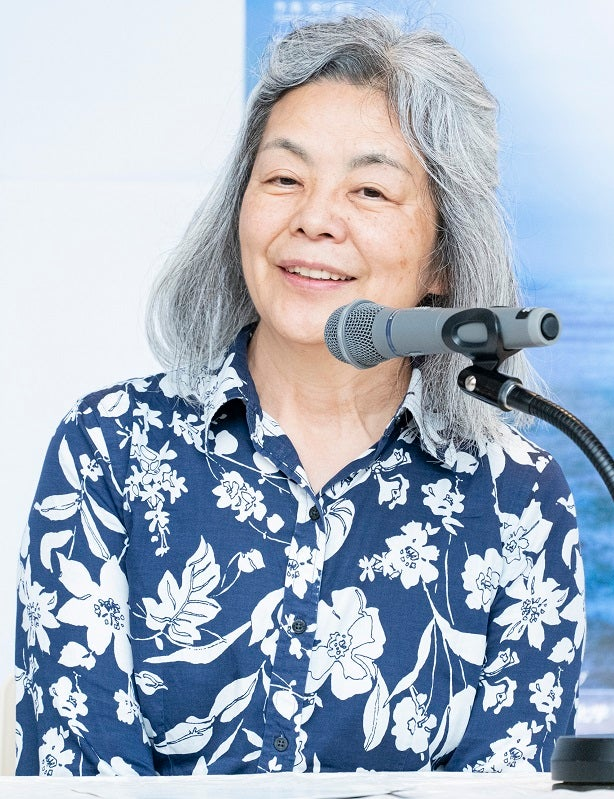
- Yōko Tawada in 2025
- Born: March 23, 1960 (age 66); Tokyo, Japan
- Education: Waseda University (BA); Hamburg University (MA); University of Zurich (PhD)
- Occupation: Writer
- Writing career
- Language: Japanese, German
- Genres: Fiction, poetry
- Notable works: The Bridegroom Was a Dog; Suspect on the Night Train; Nur da wo du bist da ist nichts / Anata no iru tokoro dake nani mo nai
- Notable awards: Gunzo Prize for New Writers; Akutagawa Prize; Tanizaki Prize; Noma Literary Prize; Izumi Kyōka Prize for Literature; Goethe Medal; Kleist Prize; Asahi Prize; Medal with Purple Ribbon
- Website: yokotawada.de

Yōko Tawada (多和田葉子 Tawada Yōko, born March 23, 1960) is a Japanese writer currently living in Berlin, Germany. She writes in both Japanese and German. She is a former writer-in-residence at MIT and Stanford University.

Tawada has won numerous literary awards, including the Akutagawa Prize, the Tanizaki Prize, the Noma Literary Prize, the Izumi Kyōka Prize for Literature, the Gunzo Prize for New Writers, the Goethe Medal, the Kleist Prize, and a National Book Award.

== Early life and education ==
Tawada was born in Nakano, Tokyo. Her father was a translator and bookseller. She attended Tokyo Metropolitan Tachikawa High School. In 1979, at the age of 19, Tawada took the Trans-Siberian Railway to visit Germany. She received her undergraduate education at Waseda University in 1982 with a major in Russian literature, and upon graduation moved to Hamburg, Germany, where she started working with one of her father's business partners in a book distribution business. She left the business to study at Hamburg University, and in 1990 she received a master's degree in contemporary German literature. In 2000 she received her doctorate in German literature from the University of Zurich, where Sigrid Weigel, her thesis advisor, had been appointed to the faculty. In 2006 Tawada moved to Berlin, where she currently resides.

== Career ==
Tawada's writing career began in 1987 with the publication of Nur da wo du bist da ist nichts—Anata no iru tokoro dake nani mo nai (Nothing Only Where You Are), a collection of poems released in a German and Japanese bilingual edition. Her first novella, titled Kakato o nakushite (Missing Heels), received the Gunzo Prize for New Writers in 1991.

In 1993 Tawada won the Akutagawa Prize for her novella Inu muko iri, which was published later that year with Kakato o nakushite and another story in the single volume Inu muko iri. Arufabetto no kizuguchi also appeared in book form in 1993, and Tawada received her first major recognition outside of Japan by winning the Lessing Prize Scholarship. An English edition of the three-story collection Inu muko iri, translated by Margaret Mitsutani, was published in 1998 but was not commercially successful. New Directions Publishing reissued the Mitsutani translation of the single Akutagawa Prize-winning novella in 2012 under the title The Bridegroom Was a Dog.

Several other books followed, including Seijo densetsu (Legend of a Saint) in 1996 and Futakuchi otoko (The Man With Two Mouths) in 1998. Portions of these books were translated into English by Margaret Mitsutani and collected in a 2009 book titled Facing the Bridge. Tawada won the 1996 Adelbert von Chamisso Prize, a German literary award for non-native speakers of German. In 1997 she was writer in residence at Villa Aurora, and in 1999 she spent four months as the Max Kade Foundation Distinguished Writer-in-Residence at the Massachusetts Institute of Technology. She won the Izumi Kyōka Prize for Literature for her 2000 book Hinagiku no ocha no baai, and both the Sei Ito Literature Prize and the Tanizaki Prize in 2003 for Yogisha no yako ressha (Suspect on the Night Train).

Tawada took a bilingual approach to her 2004 novel Das nackte Auge, writing first in German, then in Japanese, and finally producing separate German and Japanese manuscripts. The novel follows a Vietnamese girl who was kidnapped at a young age while in Germany for a youth conference. An English version, translated from the German manuscript by Susan Bernofsky, was published by New Directions Publishing in 2009 under the title The Naked Eye. In 2005, Tawada won the prestigious Goethe Medal from the Goethe-Institut for meritorious contributions to German culture by a non-German. From January to February 2009, she was the Writer-in-Residence at the Stanford University Department of Literatures, Cultures, and Languages.

In 2011, inspired by the story of the orphaned polar bear Knut, Tawada wrote three interlocking short stories exploring the relationship between humans and animals from the perspective of three generations of captive polar bears. As with previous work, she wrote separate manuscripts in Japanese and German. In 2011 the Japanese version, titled Yuki no renshūsei, was published in Japan. It won the 2011 Noma Literary Prize and the 2012 Yomiuri Prize. In 2014 the German version, titled Etüden im Schnee, was published in Germany. An English edition of Etüden im Schnee, translated by Susan Bernofsky, was published by New Directions Publishing in 2016 under the title Memoirs of a Polar Bear. It won the inaugural Warwick Prize for Women in Translation.

Tawada won the 2013 Erlanger Prize for her work translating poetry between Japanese and German.

In 2014 her novel Kentoshi, a near-future dystopian story of a great-grandfather who grows stronger while his great-grandson grows weaker, was published in Japan. An English version, translated by Margaret Mitsutani, was published in the US by New Directions Publishing in 2018 under the title The Emissary. and as The Last Children of Tokyo by Portobello Books/Granta Books in the UK.

In 2016 she received the Kleist Prize, and in 2018 she was awarded the Carl Zuckmayer Medal for services to the German language. Also in 2018, she received the National Book Award for Translated Literature (the inaugural year of that award) for her novel The Emissary, translated by Margaret Mitsutani. In 2022, her novel Scattered All Over the Earth, also translated by Mitsutani, was a National Book Award for Translated Literature finalist.

In 2025, she published Exophony: Voyages Outside the Mother Tongue, her first collection of essays in English. Translated by Lisa Hoffman-Kuroda, the essays explore the idea of intermingled languages. The book was named one of the best books of the year so far by The New Yorker in August.

== Writing style ==
Tawada writes in Japanese and German. Scholars of her work have adopted her use of the term exophony to describe the condition of writing in a non-native language. Early in her career Tawada enlisted the help of a translator to produce German editions of her Japanese manuscripts, but later she simultaneously generated separate manuscripts in each language through a process she calls "continuous translation." Over time her work has diverged by genre as well as language, with Tawada tending to write longer works such as plays and novels in Japanese, and shorter works such as short stories and essays in German. She also tends to create more neologisms when writing in German than when writing in Japanese.

Tawada's writing highlights the strangeness of one language, or particular words in one language, when seen from the perspective of someone who speaks another language. Her writing uses unexpected words, alphabets, and ideograms to call attention to the need for translation in everyday life. She has said that language is not natural but rather "artificial and magical," and has encouraged translators of her work to replace word play in her manuscripts with new word play in their own languages.

A common theme in Tawada's work is the relationship between words and reality, and in particular the possibility that differences in languages may make assimilation into a different culture impossible. For example, Tawada has suggested that a native Japanese speaker understands different words for "pencil" in German and Japanese as referring to two different objects, with the Japanese word referring to a familiar pencil and the German word referring to a pencil that is foreign and "other." However, her work also challenges the connection between national language and nationalism, particularly the kokugo/kokutai relationship in Japanese culture.

Tawada's stories often involve traveling across boundaries. Her writing draws on Tawada's own experiences of traveling between countries and cultures, but it also explores more abstract boundaries, such as the boundary between waking life and dreams, between thoughts and emotions, or between the times before and after a disaster. For example, the main character in her short story "Bioskoop der Nacht" dreams in a language she does not speak, and must travel to another country to learn the language and understand her own dreams. Tawada's work also employs elements of magical realism, such as the animal and plant anthropomorphism in Memoirs of a Polar Bear, in order to challenge otherwise familiar boundaries, such as the distinction between human and animal. Challenging boundaries is further explored in The Last Children of Tokyo, in which the catastrophe against which the novel is set "reconnects humans with non-human agencies, questioning the very meaning of the exclusive concept of "human". By imagining children as going back to an earlier stage rather than ever improving – a meandering that is reflected in the novel's non-linear, associative narration – Tawada terminates their ties to futurity, and with it the capitalist myth of continuous progress."

Tawada has cited Paul Celan and Franz Kafka as important literary influences.

== Bibliography ==
=== Originally in Japanese ===
- Nur da wo du bist da ist nichts / Anata no iru tokoro dake nanimo nai, 1987, Konkursbuch Verlag Claudia Gehrke, OCLC 55107823 (bilingual edition)
- Inu muko iri, Kodansha, 1993, ISBN 978-4-06-206307-4
- Arufabetto no kizuguchi, Kawade Shobō Shinsha, 1993, ISBN 978-4-309-00860-8
- Seijo densetsu, Ōta Shuppan, 1996, ISBN 978-4-87233-285-8
- Futakuchi otoko, Kawade Shobō Shinsha, 1998, ISBN 978-4-309-01244-5
- Hinagiku no ocha no baai, Shinchōsha, 2000, ISBN 978-4-10-436101-4
- Yōgisha no yakō ressha, Seidosha, 2002, ISBN 978-4-7917-5973-6
- Yuki no renshūsei, Shinchōsha, 2011, ISBN 978-4-10-436104-5
- Kentoshi, Kodansha, 2014, ISBN 978-4-06-219192-0 (published in 2018 in English as The Last Children of Tokyo (UK) and The Emissary (US))
- Chikyū ni chiribamerarete, 2018 (Scattered All Over the Earth)
- Hoshi ni honomekasarete, 2020 (Suggested in the Stars)
- Ōkami ken, with Ikuko Mizokami, Ronsosha, 2021, ISBN 978-4-8460-1972-3
- Taiyō shotō, 2022 (Archipelago of the Sun)

=== Originally in German ===
- Nur da wo du bist da ist nichts / Anata no iru tokoro dake nanimo nai, 1987, Konkursbuch Verlag Claudia Gehrke, OCLC 55107823 (bilingual edition)
- Opium für Ovid: Ein Kopfkissenbuch von 22 Frauen, 2000, Konkursbuch Verlag Claudia Gehrke, ISBN 978-3-88769-156-1
- Das nackte Auge, Konkursbuch Verlag Claudia Gehrke, 2004, ISBN 978-3-88769-324-4
- Etüden im Schnee, Konkursbuch Verlag Claudia Gehrke, 2014, ISBN 978-3-88769-737-2
- Paul Celan und der chinesische Engel, Konkursbuch Verlag Claudia Gehrke, 2020, ISBN 978-3-88769-278-0
- Eine Affäre ohne Menschen, Konkursbuch Verlag Claudia Gehrke, 2025, ISBN 978-3-88769-285-8

=== Book-length works translated to English ===
- Where Europe Begins, translated by Susan Bernofsky and Yumi Selden, New Directions Publishing, 2002, ISBN 978-0-8112-1515-2
- The Bridegroom Was a Dog (Inu muko iri, 犬婿入り), translated by Margaret Mitsutani, Kodansha, 2003, ISBN 978-4-7700-2940-9. This edition includes Missing Heels (Kakato o nakushite).
- Facing the Bridge, translated by Margaret Mitsutani, New Directions Publishing, 2007, ISBN 978-0-8112-1690-6
- The Naked Eye, translated by Susan Bernofsky, New Directions Publishing, 2009, ISBN 978-0-8112-1739-2
- Yoko Tawada's Portrait of a Tongue: An Experimental Translation by Chantal Wright, University of Ottawa Press, 2013, ISBN 978-0-7766-0803-7
- Memoirs of a Polar Bear, translated by Susan Bernofsky, New Directions Publishing, 2016, ISBN 978-0-8112-2578-6
- The Last Children of Tokyo (UK) / The Emissary (US), translated by Margaret Mitsutani, New Directions Publishing, 2018, ISBN 978-0-8112-2762-9
- Opium for Ovid (Limited Edition), translated by Kenji Hayakawa, Stereoeditions, 2018 – ongoing. Collection of 22 separate books.
- Scattered All Over the Earth, translated by Margaret Mitsutani, New Directions Publishing, 2022, ISBN 978-0-8112-2928-9
- Three Streets, translated by Margaret Mitsutani, New Directions Publishing, 2022, ISBN 978-0-8112-2930-2
- Paul Celan and the Trans-Tibetan Angel (US) / Spontaneous Acts (UK), translated by Susan Bernofsky, New Directions Publishing / Dialogue Books, 2024, ISBN 978-0-8112-3487-0 (US) / ISBN 978-0-349-70423-4 (UK)
- Suggested in the Stars, translated by Margaret Mitsutani, New Directions Publishing, 2024, ISBN 978-0-8112-3793-2
- Archipelago of the Sun, translated by Margaret Mitsutani, New Directions Publishing, 2025, ISBN 978-0-8112-3979-0

=== Essay collections translated to English ===
- Exophony. Translated by Hofmann-Kuroda, Lisa. New Directions Publishing. 2025. ISBN 978-0-8112-3787-1.

=== Selected shorter works translated to English ===
- "Hair Tax," translated by Susan Bernofsky, Words Without Borders, April 2005 issue
- "Celan Reads Japanese", translated by Susan Bernofsky, The White Review, March 2013
- "The Far Shore", translated by Jeffrey Angles, Words Without Borders, March 2015 issue
- "To Zagreb", translated by Margaret Mitsutani, Granta 131, 2015
- "Memoirs of a Polar Bear", translated by Susan Bernofsky, Granta 136, 2016
- "Time Differences", translated by Jeffrey Angles, Strangers Press, 2017, ISBN 978-1-911343-01-1
- "The Texture of Angel Matter", translated by Susan Bernofsky, Granta 165, 2023

== Recognition ==
- 1991 Gunzo Prize for New Writers
- 1993 Akutagawa Prize for The Bridegroom Was a Dog (Inu muko iri, 犬婿入り)
- 1993 Lessing Prize Scholarship
- 1996 Adelbert von Chamisso Prize
- 2000 Izumi Kyōka Prize for Literature
- 2003 Sei Ito Literature Prize
- 2003 Tanizaki Prize for Suspect on the Night Train (Yogisha no yako ressha, 容疑者の夜行列車)
- 2005 Goethe Medal
- 2011 Noma Literary Prize
- 2012 Yomiuri Prize
- 2013 Erlanger Literaturpreis
- 2016 Kleist Prize
- 2017 Warwick Prize for Women in Translation (shared with translator Susan Bernofsky)
- 2018 Carl Zuckmayer Medal
- 2018 National Book Award for Translated Literature for The Emissary (shared with translator Margaret Mitsutani)
- 2018 Japan Foundation Awards
- 2019 Asahi Prize
- 2020 Medal with Purple Ribbon
- 2022 Honorary doctorate, SOAS University of London
- 2023 Prix Fragonard for The Emissary (shared with the book's French translator, Dominique Palmé)
- 2023 Mainichi Publishing Culture Award
- 2024 Prize of the Japanese Academy of Arts
- 2024 Named a member of Academy of Arts, Berlin
- 2025 Nelly Sachs Prize
