= Mainichi Publishing Culture Award =

Japanese literary award

The Mainichi Publishing Culture Award (毎日出版文化賞; Mainichi Shuppan Bunka Shō) is an annual award given to distinguished literary works and activities in the sectors literature and art, humanities and social science, natural science, and encyclopedic work, plus a special award. It was founded in 1947 and is sponsored by the Mainichi Newspapers Co., the publishing house of the Mainichi Shimbun.

== Recipients (selected) ==
1947

- Literature and art award for Jun'ichirō Tanizaki for Sasameyuki (The Makioka Sisters)
- Literature and art award for Yuriko Miyamoto for Kazeshirigusa and Harimaheiya

1948

- Literature and art award for Michio Takeyama for Biruma no tategoto

1951

- Literature and art award for Kōnosuke Hinatsu for Nihon gendaishi taikei

1952

- Literature and art award for Hiroshi Noma for Shinkū chitai

1954

- Literature and art award for Sue Sumii for Yoru ake asa ake

1955

- Literature and art award for Ken Domon for Murō-ji
- Literature and art award for Shigeharu Nakano for Muragimo

1958

- Literature and art award for Shūsaku Endō for Umi to dokuyaku

1959

- Literature and art award for Shūgorō Yamamoto for Mominoki wa nokotta
- Literature and art award for Saisei Murō for Waga aisuru shijin no denki
- Literature and art award for Junji Kinoshita for Dorama no sekai

1960

- Literature and art award for Tomie Ōhara for En to iu onna

1961

- Literature and art award for Shōhei Ōoka for Kaei
- Literature and art award for Tarō Okamoto for Wasurerareta nihon

1962

- Literature and art award for Yasunari Kawabata for Nemure bijo (The House of the Sleeping Beauties)

1963

- Literature and art award for Kazuo Hirotsu for Nengatsu no ahioto

1964

- Literature and art award for Morio Kita for Nireke no hitobito (The House of Nire)

1965

- Literature and art award for Haruo Umezaki for Genka

1966

- Literature and art award for Junji Kinoshita for Mugenkidō

1967

- Literature and art award for Shōtarō Yasuoka for Maku ga orite kara

1968

- Literature and art award for Takeshi Kaikō for Kagayakeru yami

1969

- Literature and art award for Jūkichi Uno for Shingeki tanoshi kanashi

1972

- Literature and art award for Junzō Shōno for Akio to Ryoji

1973

- Literature and art award for Akira Abe for Sennen

1974

- Literature and art award for Saburō Shiroyama for Rakujitsu moyu
- Literature and art award for Shin'ichirō Nakamura for Kono hyakunen no shōsetsu

1976

- Literature and art award for Hideo Takubo for Kami no wa

1977

- Literature and art award for Kenji Nakagami for Karekinada

1978

- Literature and art award for Chikao Tanaka for Gekiteki buntairon josetsu

1994

- Literature and art award for Hiroyuki Agawa for Shiga Naoya

1995

- Literature and art award for Tadao Satō for Nihon eiga-shi

2001

- Literature and art award for Taeko Tomioka for Arikuchi Shinobu nōto

2004

- Literature and art award for Kazushige Abe for Shinsemia

2005

- Literature and art award for Ryū Murakami for Hanto o deyo (From the Fatherland, with Love)

2007

- Literature and art award for Shuichi Yoshida for Akunin (Villain)

2009

- Literature and art award for Haruki Murakami for 1Q84

2020

- Humanities and social science award for Takehiko Kariya for Oitsuita Kindai Keita Kindai (Who killed Japan's Modernity? What Comes after 'Catch-Up?')
