= From the Fatherland, with Love =

2005 novel by Ryū Murakami

- Author: Ryū Murakami
- Original title: 『半島を出よ』
- Language: Japanese
- Publisher: Gentosha (Japanese); Pushkin Press (English)
- Publication date: 2005
- Publication place: Japan
- English publication date: 2013

From the Fatherland, with Love (半島を出よ, Hantō o Deyo) is a novel by Ryū Murakami, first published in Japanese in 2005 and translated into English in 2013 by Ralph McCarthy, Charles De Wolf, and Ginny Tapley. The novel depicts an alternate history in which North Korea invades and then occupies the Japanese island of Kyushu in 2011. Murakami states that he spent 3 years researching the novel, including interviewing 20 refugees from North Korea.

== Awards ==
From the Fatherland With Love was awarded the 59th Mainichi Publishing Culture Award and the 58th Noma Literary Prize in 2005.

== Reception ==
The Times Literary Supplement described it as "impressive".

== See also ==
- Invasion literature
- Red Dawn
