= Gunzo Prize for New Writers =

Japanese literary award

The Gunzo New Writers' Prize (群像新人文学賞, Gunzō Shinjin Bungakushō) is an annual literary prize awarded by Japanese literary magazine Gunzo, published by Kodansha. It was established in 1958 with two categories, one for novels and one for commentary. Starting in 2015, the criticism category was separated out and renamed the Gunzo Prize for New Criticism (群像新人評論賞).

According to submission rules, novels submitted must be between 250 and 500 pages, while commentary must be no more than 100 pages (raised from 50 pages in 2003). The winning writer receives a prize of 500,000 yen, with the winning work being published in the June edition of Gunzo.

== List of winners ==
=== Novels ===
Year	Author	Japanese title	Rōmaji	English
1958	No winner selected			
1959	No winner selected			
1960	Tamako Koga	魔笛	Mateki	The Magic Flute
1961	No winner selected			
1962	Kei Nishihara	日蝕	Nisshoku	Solar Eclipse
1963	Ryūichi Fumisawa	重い車	Omoi Kuruma	
1964	Michiko Miyoshi	どくだみ	Dokudami	Chameleon plant
1965	Tōru Kurobe	砂の関係	Sunano Kankei	
1966	No winner selected			
1967	Hirotoshi Kondō	骨	Hone	
1968	Minako Ōba	三匹の蟹	Sanpiki no Kani	Three Crabs
1969	Lee Hoesung	またふたたびの道	Mata Futatabi no Michi	The Same Road Again
1970	Kōsuke Katsuki	出発の周辺	Shuppatsu no Shuuhen	
1971	Miyoko Kobayashi	髪の花	Kami no Hana	Hair Flowers
1971	Yoshitaka Hirokawa	チョーク	Chōku	Chalk
1972	No winner selected			
1973	No winner selected			
1974	Akira Iida	迪子とその夫	Michiko to sono otto	
1974	Hitoshi Morimoto	或る回復	Aru Kaifuku	Recovery
1974	Michitsuna Takahashi	退屈しのぎ	Taikutsushinosugi	Killing Time
1975	Kyōko Hayashi	祭りの場	Matsuri no ba	Festival Site
1976	Ryū Murakami	限りなく透明に近いブルー	Kagirinaku Tōmeini Chikai Burū	Almost Transparent Blue
1977	No winner selected			
1978	Ryōsuke Obata	永遠に一日	Eien ni Ichinichi	Forever One Day
1978	Kei Nakazawa	海を感じる時	Umi wo Kanjiru Toki	When You Feel The Sea
1979	Haruki Murakami	風の歌を聴け	Kaze no Utawo Kike	Hear the Wind Sing
1980	Taku Hasegawa	昼と夜	Hiru to Yoru	Day and Night
1981	Yoriko Shōno	極楽	Gokuraku	Paradise
1982	No winner selected			
1983	Naoyuki Ii	草のかんむり	Kusa no Kanmuri	A Crown of Grass
1984	Fumiko Hanagi	ダミアンズ、私の獲物	Damianzu, Watashi no Emono	Damiens, My Prey
1985	李起昇	ゼロはん	Zerohan	
1985	Haruhiko Yoshimeki	ジパング	Jipangu	Cipangu
1986	Chihiro Arai	復活祭のためのレクイエム	Fukkatsusai no Tame no Rekuiemu	Requiem for Easter
1987	Yōko Shimoi	あなたについて わたしについて	Anata ni tsuite Watashi ni tsuite	About You, About Me
1987	Takayuki Suzuki	ポートレイト・イン・ナンバー	Pōtoreito In Nanbā	Portrait in Number
1988	石田邦男	アルチュール・エリソンの素描	Aruchūru Erison no Sobyō	Arthur Ellison's Drawings
1989	No winner selected			
1990	Wataru Takano	コンビニエンスロゴス	Konbiniensu Rogosu	Convenience Logos
1991	Yoko Tawada	かかとを失くして	Kakato wo Nakushite	Losing My Heel
1992	No winner selected			
1993	No winner selected			
1994	Kazushige Abe	生ける屍の夜	Ikeru Shikabane no Yoru	Night of the Living Dead
1995	No winner selected			
1996	No winner selected			
1996	Excellence Mention Sonoe Dōgaki	足下の土	Ashimoto no Tsuchi	The Earth Under Your Feet
1997	Yoshihisa Okazaki	秒速 10 センチの越冬	Byōsoku Jū Senchi no Ettō	Passing the Winter at 10 Centimetres per Second
1998	No winner selected			
1998	Excellence Mention Tetsuya Kamada	水のはじまり	Mizu no Hajimari	The Start of the Water
1999	No winner selected			
2000	Hajime Yokota	(世界記録)	(Sekai Kiroku)	(World Record)
2000	Excellence Mention Yūji Nakai	フリースタイルのいろんな話	Furīstairu no Ironna Hanashi	Various Freestyle Chats
2001	Tōru Hagiwara	蚤の心臓ファンクラブ	Nomi no Shinzō Fankurabu	Flea Heart Fan Club
2001	Excellence Mention Rio Shimamoto	シルエット	Shiruetto	Silhouette
2002	Tomoki Teramura	死せる魂の幻想、	Shiseru Tamashī no Gensō	Visions of Dead Souls
2002	Daisuke Hayakawa	ジャイロ！	Jairo!	Gyro!
2003	Ken Mori	火薬と愛の星	Kayaku to Ai no Hoshi	Gunpowder and the Star of Love
2003	Excellence Mention Sayaka Murata	授乳	Junyū	Breastfeeding
2003	Excellence Mention Aya Wakisaka	鼠と肋骨	Nezumi to rokkotsu	Mice and ribs
2004	Mika Jūmonji	狐寝入夢虜	Kitsune ne nyū yume toriko	
2004	Excellence Mention Norikazu Satō	サージウスの死神	Sājiusu no Shinigami	Sarzius the Reaper
2005	Naoya Higuchi	さよなら アメリカ	Sayonara Amerika	Goodbye, America
2005	Excellence Mention Anne Mochizuki	グルメな女と優しい男	Gurumena Onna to Yasashii Otoko	The Gourmet Women and the Kind Man
2006	Furukuri Kinoshita	無限のしもべ	Mugen no Shimobe	The Endless Subordinate
2006	Asuka Asahina	憂鬱なハスビーン	Yūutsuna Hasubīn	Depressed Has-been
2006	Excellence Mention Nozomi Fukatsu	煙幕	Enmaku	Smokescreen
2008	Yoriko Matsuo	子守唄しか聞こえない	Komori-uta Shika Kikoenai	All I Can Hear Is a Lullaby
2009	Daisuke Maruoka	カメレオン狂のための戦争学習帳	Kamereon-kyō no Tame no Sensō Gakushū-chō	A War Study Guide for Chamaeleon Enthusiasts
2010	Keita Asakawa	朝が止まる	Asa ga Tomaru	The Morning Halts
2010	Yosuke Nomizu	後悔さきにたたず	Kōkai Saki ni Tatazu	Don't Cry Over Spilt Milk
2011	Naoko Nakano	美しい私の顔	Utsukushī Watashi no Kao	My Beautiful Face
2012	Manabu Okamoto	架空列車、	Kakū Ressha	Aerial Train
2012	Excellence Mention Chioru Katase	泡をたたき割る人魚は	Awa o Tataki Waru Ningyo wa	The Mermaid Who Breaks the Bubbles
2012	Excellence Mention Kazuo Fujisaki	グッバイ、こおろぎ君。	Gubbai, Kōrogi-kun.	Goodbye, Cricket
2013	Riku Hatano	鶏が鳴く	Tori ga Naku	The Cock Crows
2014	Yūta Yokoyama	吾輩ハ猫ニナル	Wagahai wa Neko ni Naru	I Become a Cat
2015	Yūsuke Norishiro	十七八より	Jūshichihachi Yori	
2016	Sil Choi	ジニのパズル	Jini no Pazuru	Gini's Puzzle
2017	No winner selected			
2017	Excellence Mention Tomomi Uehara	天袋	Amabukuro	Heavenly Bag
2017	Excellence Mention Li Kotomi	独舞	Hitorimai	Solo Dance
2018	Yūko Hōjō	美しい顔	Utsukushī Kao	Beautiful Face
2019	Maho Ishikura	そこどけあほが通るさかい	Soko doke a ho ga tōrusakai	Get Out of the Way, an Idiot Is Coming Through
2020	No winner selected			
2020	Excellence Mention Mahiro Yuasa	四月の岸辺	Shigatsu no Kishibe	April's Shore
2021	Mai Ishizawa	貝に続く場所にて	Kai ni Tsuzuku Basho Nite	The Place of Shells
2021	Daiki Shimaguchi	鳥がぼくらは祈り、	Tori ga Bokura wa Inori,	We Birds Prayed...
2021	Excellence Mention K-Sanzō Matsunaga	カメオ	Kameo	Cameo
2022	Chito Kosagawa	家庭用安心坑夫	Katei-yō Anshin Kōfu	Safe Miner for Use at Home
2022	Itsu Hirasawa	点滅するものの革命	Tenmetsu Suru Mono no Kakumei	A Revolution of Flickering
2023	Natsuki Murakumo	もぬけの考察	Monuke no Kōsatsu	A Discussion of Exuvia
2023	Yasuko Yumeno	ジューンドロップ	Jūndoroppu	June Drop
2024	Kōhei Toyonaga	月ぬ走いや、馬ぬ走い	Chichi nu haiya, 'nma nu hai	Moon Running, Horse Running
2024	Excellence Mention Ichi Shiratori	遠くから来ました	Tōku kara Kimashita	I Came from Far Away
