= Keiko Iwasaka =

Keiko Iwasaka (岩阪恵子; born June 17, 1946) is a Japanese novelist.

== Biography ==
Iwasaki was born in Nara or Osaka, Japan on June 17, 1946. She began writing poetry in high school, and began writing novels after graduating from Kwansei Gakuin University. She is married to Takayuki Kiyooka.

She won the Noma Literary Prize in 1986 for her novel Mimoza no Hayashi de (ミモザの林を). Her Gakka Koide Narashige no Shōzō (画家小出楢重の肖像) won the Hirabayashi Taiko Prize in 1992. Her 1994 Yodogawa ni Chikai Machi kara (淀川にちかい町から) won the Murasaki Shikibu Prize and the Geijutsu Senshō. She was awarded the 2000 Kawabata Yasunari Literary Award for her Ame nochi Ame? (雨のち雨？).

She also wrote two nonfiction works about the poets Shōhei Kiyama and Mokutarō Kinoshita. Reviewers wrote positively about both books.

== Selected works ==
- Mimoza no Hayashi de (ミモザの林を), 1986
- Gakka Koide Narashige no Shōzō (画家小出楢重の肖像), 1992
- Yodogawa ni Chikai Machi kara (淀川にちかい町から), 1994
- Ame nochi Ame? (雨のち雨？), 2000
