= Kei Nakazawa =

Japanese writer and professor

- 中沢 けい
- Born: 本田 恵美子; 1959 (age 66–67); Yokohama, Japan
- Education: Meiji University
- Occupations: Professor, novelist, essayist
- Employer: Hosei University
- Notable work: Umi o kanjiru toki; Suiheisenjō nite; Gakutai no usagi
- Title: Professor of Literature
- Awards: Gunzo Prize for New Writers; Noma Literary New Face Prize
- Website: Official website

Kei Nakazawa (中沢 けい, Nakazawa Kei; born 1959) is the professional name of Emiko Honda (本田 恵美子, Honda Emiko), a Japanese writer and professor. Nakazawa has won the Gunzo Prize for New Writers and the Noma Literary New Face Prize, and two of her novels have been adapted for film. Since 2005 she has been a professor of literature at Hosei University.

== Early life and education ==
Nakazawa was born in Yokohama in 1959. Her family later moved to Tateyama, Chiba, where Nakazawa's father died in 1970. At the age of 18 Nakazawa wrote Umi o kanjiru toki (海を感じる時, When I Sense the Sea), a sexually explicit story about a high school girl whose unrequited love for a male classmate leads to conflict with her mother. Umi o kanjiru toki won the 1978 Gunzo Prize for New Writers and sold over 600,000 copies in Japan. Nakazawa attended Meiji University, and married her husband while still a student.

== Career ==
Nakazawa followed Umi o kanjiru toki with the novel Onna tomodachi (女ともだち, Female Friends) and the short story collection Nobudō o tsumu (野ぶどうを摘む, Picking a Wild Grape). In 1985, when Nakazawa was 25 years old, her mother died at the age of 40. That same year, Nakazawa published Suiheisenjō nite (水平線上にて, On the Horizon), which won the 7th Noma Literary New Face Prize. After she won the award, her marriage ended in divorce. In subsequent years Nakazawa wrote several more books, including the 1999 novel Mamebatake no hiru (豆畑の昼, Midday in the Peanut Field), about childhood sweethearts who have a love affair despite being involved with other people, and the 2000 novel Gakutai no usagi (楽隊のうさぎ, Band Rabbits), a story about junior high school students in a brass band.

Since 2005 Nakazawa has been a professor of literature at Hosei University. In 2007 Nakazawa was the subject of one volume of Kanae Shobō's Contemporary Women Writer Readers series of books, each of which compiles selections from an author's works, an annotated bibliography, and critical essays from other authors. In 2013 a film adaptation of her novel Gakutai no usagi, starring Masaru Miyazaki and directed by Takuji Suzuki, premiered at the 26th Tokyo International Film Festival. A film adaptation of her novel Umi o kanjiru toki, directed by Hiroshi Ando and starring Yui Ichikawa, and based on a decades-old Haruhiko Arai script that Nakazawa originally refused to allow to be filmed, was released in 2014. Umi o kanjiru toki held its international premiere at the 2015 Rotterdam Film Festival under the English title Undulant Fever.

In addition to her fiction writing, Nakazawa is an essayist who regularly writes opinion columns on current events for Asahi Shimbun. In 2015 she published the nonfiction book Anti-Hate / Dialogue (アンチヘイト・ダイアローグ), a series of conversations with professionals from different fields about the rise of hate speech.

== Recognition ==
- 1978 – 21st Gunzo Prize for New Writers
- 1985 – 7th Noma Literary New Face Prize

== Bibliography ==
- Umi o kanjiru toki (海を感じる時, When I Sense the Sea), Kodansha, 1978, ISBN 9784061139688
- Onna tomodachi (女ともだち, Female Friends), Kawade Shobo Shinsha, 1981, ISBN 9784309000572
- Nobudō o tsumu (野ぶどうを摘む, Picking a Wild Grape), Kodansha, 1981, OCLC 41897350
- Suiheisenjō nite (水平線上にて, On the horizon), Kodansha, 1985, ISBN 9784062019354
- Mamebatake no hiru (豆畑の昼, Midday in the Peanut Field), Kodansha, 1999, ISBN 9784062096591
- Gakutai no usagi (楽隊のうさぎ, Band Rabbits), Shinchosha, 2000, ISBN 9784104377015
- Anti-Hate / Dialogue (アンチヘイト・ダイアローグ), Jinbun Shoin, 2015, ISBN 9784409241066

== Film adaptations ==
- Gakutai no usagi, 2013
- Umi o kanjiru toki (Undulant Fever), 2014
