= Nipponia Nippon (novel) =

Novel by Kazushige Abe

- Cover of the 2004 Japanese edition
- Author: Kazushige Abe
- Original title: ニッポニアニッポン
- Translator: Kerim Yasar
- Language: Japanese
- Publisher: Shinchosha, Pushkin Press
- Publication date: 2001
- Publication place: Japan
- English publication date: 2023
- Pages: 160 (English ed.)
- ISBN: 9781782278535
- OCLC: 1354648170

Nipponia Nippon (ニッポニアニッポン, 2001) is a novel by Japanese writer Kazushige Abe, originally published in the June 2001 issue of Shincho, before appearing in book form the same year in an edition by Shinchosha. The work was nominated for the Akutagawa Prize in 2001, and for the Mishima Yukio Prize the following year.

The title refers to the Japanese crested ibis, an endangered bird native to regions of East Asia. It was translated into English by Kerim Yasar for Pushkin Press in 2023.

== Plot summary ==
The story takes place in Kamimachi, Higashine City, in Yamagata Prefecture. Toya Haruo is a seventeen-year-old Japanese hikkikomori and incel who lives by himself after dropping out of high school and becoming estranged from his family. Spending most of his time sitting at his computer, he becomes fixated on a pair of crested ibises, Yu Yu and Mei Mei, being bred in captivity on Sado Island. Harou feels an affinity for the birds because the beginning of his surname is written using the kanji for "crested ibis" (鴇), but he becomes angry when he learns that the birds are in fact genetically Chinese, and not Japanese. Haruo then decides that he must either "breed them, free them, or kill them." Since breeding them in his apartment would be impossible, he decides that his only options are to free them or kill them.

Haruo begins researching the Conservation Center where the birds are kept to determine how he might bypass security and break into their cages. In preparation for his mission, he purchases a stun baton, pepper spray, handcuffs, and a knife. He also tries to purchase a gun from an online forum, but when he hesitates to send the seller payment, the two get into an argument and Haruo decides he no longer needs it. The seller insults him, and Haruo becomes angry enough that he ends up revealing parts of his plan to him before disconnecting.

Haruo realizes that he needs to test the efficacy of his stun baton before carrying out his plan, and uses it successfully against some vagrants he encounters. He becomes addicted to the thrill of ambushing his victims, and even manages to attack students and salarymen. The attacks are reported on the news, but a copycat is ultimately caught by the police and confesses, and so Haruo decides to stop before he, too, is discovered.

Ultimately, Haruo carries out his plan: he breaks into the Conservation Center at night, accidentally setting off the alarm as he does so, forces open the birds' cage, and subdues two guards, killing one of them. During the struggle the ibses escape, and Haruo flees the scene, only to be apprehended by the police.

In the final section of the book, Haruo gets up late to eat breakfast and watch television, where he learns about the break-in at the Conservation Center. This turns out to be a different Haruo from the story's protagonist, and is in fact the person who tried to sell the other Haruo a gun. He posts the email exchange between himself and his namesake on an online forum, but no one believes him.

== Reception ==
Drawing on an interview with the author, psychiatrist Tamaki Saitō, points out that Nipponia Nippon is an attempt to combine Yukio Mishima's The Temple of the Golden Pavilion with Kenzaburō Ōe's Seventeen.

The Complete Review gave the book a B+: "Much in Nipponia Nippon is really very well done, and if Abe ultimately can't entirely pull it off, it's still a solid novella."
