= Still Life and Other Stories =

Collection of stories by Junzo Shono

Still Life and Other Stories is a collection of stories by Junzo Shono, translated into English by Wayne P. Lammers, with the translations published in 1992 by Stone Bridge Press. It was the first English translation of a work by Shono. Publishers Weekly stated that eleven of the stories collectively "form a sort of novella".

Paul W. Landerman, in a review for the magazine Education About Asia, wrote that the volume has a "Zen perspective". Landerman stated that a reader may, if they read the work once, will see "postmodernist existential angst", but reading the volume more than once would reveal more "meaning and depth".

Publishers Weekly describes the translation work as "excellent".
