= Hirosuke Hamada =

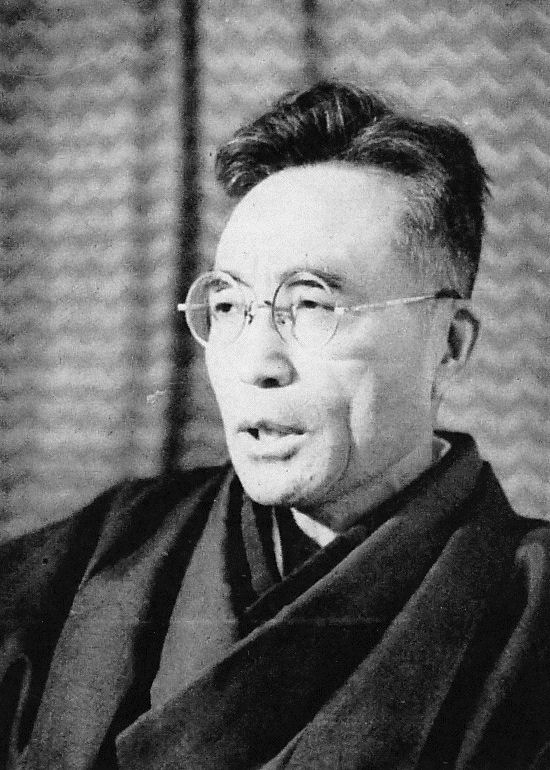
- Born: May 25, 1893; Takahata, Yamagata Prefecture, Japan
- Died: November 17, 1973 (aged 80); Ōta, Tokyo
- Writing career
- Language: Japanese

Hirosuke Hamada (浜田 広介, Hamada Hirosuke; May 25, 1893 - November 17, 1973) was a Japanese children's book writer. His birth name was Hamada Hirosuke (濱田 廣助). He was the first president of the Japan Juvenile Writers Association.

Some of his most well-known works are The Red Oni who Cried (泣いた赤鬼, Naita Aka-oni), A Dream of a Gray Starling (椋鳥の夢, Mukudori no yume) and Dragon's Tears (竜の目の涙, Ryu no me no namida), and a series of works known as Hirosuke's Fairytales (ひろすけ童話, Hirosuke Dōwa).

Together with Jōji Tsubota and Mimei Ogawa, he is considered one of the "Three Sacred Treasures of Youth Literature" in Japan.

== Life and career ==
Hamada was born into a rural household in Takahata, Higashiokitama District, Yamagata Prefecture. During his childhood his favorite author was Iwaya Sazanami. He studied at the Yonezawa Junior High School (current Yamagata Prefectural Yonezawa Kojokan High School), and graduated in English Language and Literature at Waseda University. During his junior high school days, he made doujinshi with Okuma Nobuyuki and Kamiizumi Hidenobu.

In 1914, the year he entered university, his short story “Downfall (零落, Reiraku)” was selected for the Yorozu Chōhō prize for best novel, and he went on to write several novels. In 1917, “Golden Rice Sheaf (黄金の稲束, Ōgon no inazuka)” won the first prize for a new fairy tale in the “Osaka Asahi Shinbun”, and he began to publish stories for children for the children's magazine “Ryōyū (良友)”. The following year, Kosuke received the Kitamura-Torutani Award for “Dokyoshishi,” and eventually began to aspire to become a children's story writer (during this period, he declined Miekichi Suzuki's invitation to join “Akai Tori”).

In 1921, he moved to Jitsugyo no Nihon sha, appointed by Tōson Shimazaki and edited Yōnen no tomo (幼年之友) magazine. In the same year, he published his first collection of fairy tales, "The Starling's Dream". After he left his job in 1923 due to the Great Kanto Earthquake, he continued to publish many fairy tales in the magazine. In 1925, he founded the Waseda Fairy Tale Society (早大童話会). In 1928, he got married.

In 1940, he received the Japan Cultural Association Children's Culture Award. In 1942, he received the Noma Literary Encouragement Award.

He received the Sankei Children's Publishing Culture Award in 1957 and 1961. In 1972, he was honored as an honorary citizen of Takahata, and a "memorial monument" was erected in front of the town hall.

In 1973, he died of prostate cancer at his home in Den-en-chofu, Ōta Ward, Tokyo.
