= Kazumi Saeki =

Japanese writer (born 1959)

Kazumi Saeki (佐伯 一麦, Saeki Kazumi; born July 21, 1959 in Sendai) is a Japanese novelist from Sendai in Miyagi prefecture. Kazumi (meaning one wheat) is his pen name, adopted because of his fondness for Van Gogh's paintings of wheat fields.

His experiences in the 2011 Great Tohoku Kanto earthquake were recounted in an op-ed piece in the New York Times under the title, "In Japan, No Time Yet for Grief" translated by Seiji M. Lippit.

After graduating from high school he moved to Tokyo and worked various jobs including in magazines and as an electrician for 10 years. In the op-ed he writes: "Before I became a writer, I worked for 10 years as an electrician, until I suffered asbestos poisoning. My main job was to travel around Tokyo, repairing lights, including street lamps and the hallway and stairway lights in apartment buildings." His 1990 novel Short Circuit was based on those experiences working as an electrician. The following year, 1991, he returned with his wife to his hometown of Sendai, where he has lived since.

In 1997 he spent a year in Norway, writing about those experiences in the novel Norge, for which he received the 2007 Noma Literary Prize.
