= The Last Children of Tokyo =

2014 science fiction novel by Yoko Tawada

- Japanese first edition (2014)
- Author: Yoko Tawada
- Translator: Margaret Mitsutani
- Cover artist: Harriet Lee-Merrion
- Language: Japanese (and English translation)
- Genre: Science fiction
- Publisher: Kodansha (Japan); Portobello Books/Granta Books (UK); New Directions Publishing (US)
- Publication date: 2018 (UK) (2014 in original Japanese)
- Media type: Print
- Pages: 138 (Granta UK edition)

The Last Children of Tokyo, originally published in Japanese as Kentoshi (献灯使), is a 2014 science fiction novel by Yoko Tawada. The English version, translated by Margaret Mitsutani, was published in the UK in 2018. It was published in the US as The Emissary.

== Plot summary ==
The novel is set in a Japan that has been devastated by an unspecified man-made global catastrophe. Yoshiro, one of Tokyo's ‘aged-elderly’ at over 100 years old, lives alone with his great-grandson Mumei, who is in second grade. They live on the outskirts of the city, the city centre being too dangerous for habitation now that earth, air and water are so polluted. Over the last century, successive generations of children have been born increasingly feeble and prone to illness, so that while the aged-elderly continue to live with undiminished vitality, and seem never to die, children of Mumei's generation are intolerant to most foods, have malformed teeth due to lack of calcium, and have severely deformed bones. The distinction between male and female has started to break down, and most people change sex at least once in their lives. Most children die young.

The privatised Japanese government has shut Japan off from the rest of the world. The use of foreign-language terms has been restricted, and people carefully self-censor their activities in case they find that something they have been doing all their lives has without notice suddenly become illegal.

Yoshiro’s wife, Marika, is a member of the underground Emissary Association, whose aim is to help selected young people stow away on foreign ships so that international scientists can research the state of Japanese children's health. Also members are Mumei's elementary school teacher, and the carer of Suiren, a young girl of about Mumei's age who lives next door. Mumei finds himself fascinated with Suiren, but one day she and her carer simply disappear without leaving any forwarding address. Yoshiro says it may be due to ‘special circumstances’.

Mumei collapses at school with a dreadful pain in his head, and a taste of blood. When he comes round, he realises that he is now 15 years old and that he has apparently skipped forward several years, although faint memories eventually return of being chosen as an emissary. He is in a powered wheelchair, no longer able to walk. Coming towards him in another wheelchair is a girl that he recognises as Suiren. They propel their wheelchairs rapidly down to the beach, and are thrown out next to each other as their chairs reach the sand. Suiren asks if Mumei will go with her across the sea. As he tries to stand and answer her, darkness envelops him and he falls into the dark waters of the strait.

== Critical reception ==
Kirkus Reviews considered the novel to be impactful, with "surrealist master Tawada [imagining] a dystopian Japan reckoning with its own identity". The reviewer called it an "ebullient meditation on language and time that feels strikingly significant in the present moment".

Writing in The Guardian, John Self called the book a "mini-epic of eco-terror, family drama and speculative fiction". It is a book like no other, he said, with its askew way of looking at things and with sprightly use of language amid the ostensibly grim premise. It is no dystopian novel, as satirical as it is tragic.

In The New York Times, Parul Sehgal wrote "Tawada is a great disciple of Kafka’s; he “predicted reality,” she is fond of saying. And while she shares certain of his preoccupations — with otherness and evoking animal life — hers is a more prosaic mission: She mirrors reality."

Literary scholars Kristina Iwata-Weickgenannt and Aidana Bolatbekkyzy argue that "Mumei’s metamorphosis from human, to bird, to sea-creature suggests an inversion of the evolutionary process, and a gradual return to water, the primordial womb of life. The catastrophe reconnects humans with non-human agencies, questioning the very meaning of the exclusive concept of “human”. By imagining children as going back to an earlier stage rather than ever improving – a meandering that is reflected in the novel’s non-linear, associative narration – Tawada terminates their ties to futurity, and with it the capitalist myth of continuous progress," and they further suggest that "we are invited to identify with Yoshirō whose experiences are closer to ours. In an entertaining, ever playful way, Tawada makes readers painfully aware of how very little the world in which we currently live may have in common with that which our great-grandchildren will be born into."

Under its US name of The Emissary the novel won the National Book Award 2018 for Translated Literature.
