= Kazushige Abe =

Japanese writer

Kazushige Abe (阿部 和重, Abe Kazushige; born September 23, 1968 in Higashine, Yamagata) is a contemporary Japanese writer.

== Works ==
- Amerika no Yoru (アメリカの夜 American Night). 1994. Kodansha. ISBN 978-4062730570 (likely reference to film technique “day for night”, known in French as “la nuit américaine”) Day for Night (film)
- ABC Sensou (ABC戦争 The ABC Wars). 1995. Kodansha. ISBN 978-4101377223
- Indivijuaru Purojekushon (インディヴィジュアル・プロジェクション Individual Projection). 1997. Shinchousha. ISBN 978-4101377216
- Koushakufujin-tei no Gogo no Paatii (公爵婦人邸の午後のパーティー The Evening Party at the Princess's House). 1997. Kodansha.
- Mujou no Sekai (無情の世界 This Cruel World). 1999. Kodansha. ISBN 978-4101377230
- Nipponia Nippon (ニッポニアニッポン Nipponia Nippon). 2001. Shinchousha. ISBN 978-4101377247
- Shinsemia (シンセミア Sinsemilla). 2003. Asahi Shinbun-sha. ISBN 978-4022643773
- Gurando Finare (グランド・フィナーレ Grand Finale). 2005. Kodansha. ISBN 978-4062757751
- Purasutikku Souru (プラスティック・ソウル Plastic Soul). 2006. Kodansha. ISBN 978-4062102605
- Misuteriasu Settingu (ミステリアス・セッティング Mysterious Soul). 2006. Asahi Shinbun-sha. ISBN 978-4022502445
- Pisutoruzu (ピストルズ Pistols). 2010. Kodansha. ISBN 978-4062161169
- Kuesa to Jusanbanme no Hashira (クエーサーと13番目の柱). 2012. Kodansha. ISBN 978-4062177696
- Shikaku (□ しかく). 2013. Little More. ISBN 978-4898153642
- Derakkusu Edishon (Deluxe Edition). 2013. Bungeishunju. ISBN 978-4163825908
- Kyaputen Sandaboruto (キャプテンサンダーボルト Captain Thunderbolt). with Kotaro Isaka. 2014. Bungeishunju. ISBN 978-4163901947
- Oganizumu (オーガニズム Orga（ni）sm). 2019. Bungeishunju. ISBN 978-4163910970
- Burakku Chenba Myujikku (ブラック・チェンバー・ミュージック Black Chamber Music). 2021. Mainichi Shimbun Publishing. ISBN 978-4620108544
- Arutimetto Edishon (Ultimate Edition). 2022. Kawade Shobo Shinsha. ISBN 978-4309030784

== Awards ==
- 1994 – 37th Gunzo Prize for New Writers: Amerika no Yoru
- 1999 – 21st Noma Literary New Face Prize: Mujo no sekai
- 2004 – 15th Sei Ito Literature Prize: Shinsemia
- 2004 – 58th Mainichi Publishing Culture Award: Shinsemia
- 2005 – 132nd Akutagawa Prize: Gurando Finare
- 2010 – 46th Tanizaki Prize: Pisutoruzu

== See also ==
- Japanese literature
- List of Japanese authors
