= Hiroshi Sakagami =

Japanese author (1936–2021)

Hiroshi Sakagami (坂上 弘, Sakagami Hiroshi, 13 February 1936 – 16 August 2021) was a noted Japanese author. He was also president of the Japan Writers' Association and director of Keio University Press.

== Biography ==
=== Early life ===
Sakagami was born in Tokyo, Japan. After moving several times during his school years (Akasaka, Kumamoto City, Kagoshima City), he entered Keio University where he studied formal logic. In 1960 he took a job with Riken Optical Industry (now Ricoh), which he left in 1995 to become an advisor to the Keio University Press.

=== Career ===
Sakagami's first novel, published at age 19, was nominated for the 1955 Akutagawa Prize. His subsequent novels often focused on social groups driven by strong ideologies, including Asa no mura (Village in the Morning, 1966) which describes the collapse of a community based on a theory of chicken breeding as the ideal organisation of society, Keita no sentaku (Keita's Decision, 1998) in which the protagonist joins a religious sect in the mountains, and Nemuran ka na (Should I sleep?, 2004) which describes how a generation devoted to Zen philosophy became entrepreneurs in the Japanese post-war economic miracle.

=== Awards ===
Sakagami received a number of awards for his writings, including the 1991 Yomiuri Prize for Yasashii teihakuchi, the 1992 Noma Literary Prize for Denen fukei, the Chūōkōron Prize for Aru aki no dekigoto (An Incident in Autumn), the New Writer's Prize of the Ministry of Culture, and the Kawabata Prize. In 2008 he became a member of the Japan Art Academy.

== Sources ==
- 10th International Literature Festival, Berlin: Biography
- Japanese Wikipedia article
