= Hideo Levy =

American-born Japanese language author (born 1950)

- Born: Ian Hideo Levy; 29 November 1950 (age 75); Berkeley, California
- Occupation: Writer
- Writing career
- Language: Japanese
- Notable awards: Noma Literary New Face Prize; Yomiuri Prize

Ian Hideo Levy (リービ 英雄, Rībi Hideo; born 29 November 1950) is an American-born Japanese language author. Levy was born in California and educated in Taiwan, the US, and Japan. He is one of the first Americans to write modern literature in Japanese, and his work has won the Noma Literary New Face Prize and the Yomiuri Prize, among other literary prizes.

== Biography ==
Levy was born in Berkeley, California on 29 November 1950 to a Polish-American mother and a Jewish father. His father named him after a friend who was imprisoned in an internment camp during World War II. Levy's father was a diplomat, and the family moved around between Taiwan, Hong Kong, Japan and the United States. He graduated from Princeton University with a bachelor's degree in East Asian studies, and later received his doctorate from the same school for studying the poet Kakinomoto no Hitomaro.

While at Princeton, Levy studied the Man'yōshū. His English translation of the text was one of the finalists of the 1982 U.S. National Book Award in the Translation category. He has referred to the Man'yōshū scholar Susumu Nakanishi as his mentor. After working as an assistant professor at Princeton, he moved to Stanford University and taught there. He later left and moved to Tokyo.

Levy gained attention in Japan as the first foreigner to win the Noma Literary Award for New Writers, which he received in 1992 for his work A Room Where the Star-Spangled Banner Cannot Be Heard. In 1996, his story Tiananmen was nominated for the Akutagawa Prize. For his contributions to the introduction of Japanese literature to foreign readers, he was honored with a Japan Foundation Special Prize in 2007. In 2017, he won the Yomiuri Prize.

== Recognition ==
- 1st Japan–U.S. Friendship Commission Prize for the Translation of Japanese Literature for his English translation of Man'yōshū, 1979.
- 14th Noma Literary New Face Prize, 1992
- Japan Foundation Award, 2007
- 68th Yomiuri Prize, 2017

== Works ==
=== Novels ===
- A Room Where the Star-Spangled Banner Cannot Be Heard (『星条旗の聞こえない部屋』, Seijōki no Kikoenai Heya; Kodansha 1992 / Kodansha Bungei Bunko 2004; trans. Christopher D. Scott, Columbia University Press, 2011)
- Ten'anmon (『天安門』; "Tiananmen"; Kodansha 1996)
- Kokumin no Uta (『国民のうた』; "Song of the People"; Kodansha 1998)
- Henrii Takeshi Rewuittsukii no Natsu no Kikō (『ヘンリーたけし レウィツキーの夏の紀行』; "Henry Takeshi Levitsky's Summer Travel Journal"; Kodansha 2002)
- Chiji ni Kudakete (『千々にくだけて』; "Broken Into Thousands of Pieces"; Kodansha 2005 / Kodansha Bunko 2008)
- Kari no Mizu (『仮の水』; Kodansha 2008)
- Mo Fan Xiang (『模範郷』; Shūeisha 2017)
- Tenro (『天路』; Kodansha 2021)

=== Literary criticism and essays ===
- Nihongo no Shōri (『日本語の勝利』; "The Victory of Japanese"; Kodansha 1992)
- Shinjuku no Man'yōshū (『新宿の万葉集』; "Shinjuku's Man'yōshū"; Asahi Shimbun 1996)
- Aidentitiizu (『アイデンティティーズ』; "Identities"; Kodansha 1997)
- Saigo no Kokkyō e no Tabi (『最後の国境への旅』; "Journey to the Final Border"; Chuou Koron Shinsha 2000)
- Nihongo o Kaku Heya (『日本語を書く部屋』; "The Room for Writing Japanese"; Iwanami Shoten 2001)
- Wareteki Chūgoku (『我的中国』; "My China"; Iwanami Shoten 2004)
- Eigo de Yomu Man'yōshū (『英語でよむ万葉集』; "Reading the Man'yōshū in English"; Iwanami Shinsho 2004)
- Ekkyō no Koe (『越境の声』; Iwanami Shoten 2007)
- En'an Kakumei Seichi e no Tabi (『延安 革命聖地への旅』; "Yan'an: Journey to a Sacred Place of the Revolution"; Kodansha 2008)
- Wareteki Nihongo: The World in Japanese (『我的日本語 The World in Japanese』; "My Japanese"; Chikuma Shobou, 2010)

=== Man'yōshū scholarship ===
- Hitomaro and the Birth of Japanese Lyricism (Princeton University Press 1984)
- The Ten Thousand Leaves: A Translation of the Man Yoshu, Japan's Premier Anthology of Classical Poetry (Princeton Library of Asian Translations) (Princeton University Press 1987)
- 万葉恋歌 Love Songs from the Man'yoshu (Kodansha International 2000)
- Man'yo Luster 万葉集 (Pie Books 2002)

=== Translations ===
- Otohiko Kaga's Riding the East Wind: A Novel of War and Peace (錨のない船, Ikari no nai Fune; "Anchorless Ship"; Kodansha America 2002)

== See also ==
- C. W. Nicol
- David Zoppetti
