= Convenience Store Woman =

2016 novel by Sayaka Murata

- First edition cover (Japan)
- Author: Sayaka Murata
- Audio read by: Nancy Wu
- Original title: コンビニ人間 (Konbini Ningen)
- Translator: Ginny Tapley Takemori
- Language: Japanese
- Set in: Japan
- Published: June 2016 in Bungakukai
- Publisher: Bungeishunjū
- Publication date: 27 July 2016
- Publication place: Japan
- English publication date: 12 June 2018
- Media type: Print
- Pages: 160
- Awards: 155th Akutagawa Prize (2016)
- ISBN: 978-4-16-390618-8
- Dewey Decimal: 895.63/6
- LC Class: PL873.U73 C6613 2018

Convenience Store Woman (Japanese: コンビニ人間, Hepburn: Konbini Ningen) is a 2016 novel by Japanese author Sayaka Murata. It won the Akutagawa Prize in 2016. Aside from writing, Murata worked at a convenience store three times a week and drew the inspiration for the novel from her experiences. It was first published in the June 2016 issue of Bungakukai and later as a book in July 2016 by Bungeishunjū.

The novel has sold over 1.5 million copies in Japan and is the first of Murata's novels to be translated into English. An English translation by Ginny Tapley Takemori was released by Grove Press (US) and Portobello Books (UK) in 2018. The book has been translated into more than thirty languages.

== Plot ==
Keiko Furukura is a 36-year-old woman who has been working part-time at a Tokyo convenience store, or konbini, for the last 18 years. She has known since childhood that she is "different": as a child, she once proposed eating a dead bird found in a park, and she broke up a fight between two boys by hitting one of them with a spade. She realises that expressing her own views and actions is inexplicable and distressing to others and that it causes problems.

One day, while still a university student, Keiko passes by the Hiiromachi Station Smile Mart, a convenience store that is opening soon and looking for workers. She applies for a job there and is accepted, quickly settling into her new routine. The highly regulated world of the konbini, where each action is prescribed by the corporate manual, allows her to maintain an identity acceptable to those around her and a sense of purpose. She models her behaviour, dress style, and even speech patterns on those of her coworkers.

Keiko maintains some friendships and a relationship with her sister Mami, who is married and recently had a son, but she is uninterested in dating or sexuality. She tells her friends she has vague chronic health issues but faces increasing social pressure to explain why, after 18 years, she is still single and working as a temp in a convenience store.

Shiraha, a new worker at the konbini, is an awkward man who cannot hold a steady job and lives on the fringes of society, since he doesn't conform to "normal" expectations. He frequently compares the state of modern gender relations to the Stone Age and struggles to perform well at work while also being disdainful of his colleagues. He tells Keiko that he started the job to find a wife, but he is shortly fired after repeatedly attempting to pursue female coworkers and customers.

Keiko notices Shiraha hanging around the store one night and takes him to a nearby restaurant, where she proposes a marriage of convenience to him. While they have no affection for each other, Shiraha agrees to move in with Keiko. They decide that by pretending to be a couple, they can avoid problems with families and a society that expects them to have romantic relationships, children, and stable jobs.

Keiko's sister, friends, and coworkers are ecstatic when they hear that Keiko is now living with a man. She continues to look after Shiraha, cooking for him and providing him with a place to sleep in the bathtub while he hides from the outside world to avoid society's expectations.

When Keiko's sister comes to visit, Keiko accidentally reveals what she is up to by telling her that Shiraha is staying in the bathroom. Her sister is upset at first, but she is reassured when Shiraha covers for Keiko, lying that the "couple" had recently had a fight. The next day, Keiko is surprised by a visit from Shiraha's sister-in-law, who tells him that he should get a job or get married.

Keiko eventually quits her job in the konbini as part of the plan to appear "normal", though she immediately feels that her life has lost purpose. She stays home doing nothing, and only at Shiraha's insistence does she apply for jobs. During a phone conversation with Shiraha's sister-in-law, Keiko asks her whether the "couple" should have children but receives a harshly negative reaction.

Shiraha accompanies Keiko on the way to her first job interview at a temp agency. They stop at a konbini, and Keiko sees that the store is poorly organised, immediately beginning to rearrange the merchandise and assist the staff. When Shiraha confronts her, she explains that her purpose in life is to be a konbini employee, even though she knows that it would be easier and more convenient for her to live the semblance of a "normal" life with him. She then walks away from an enraged Shiraha, planning to cancel the interview and resolving to find herself a new konbini to work at.

== Background ==
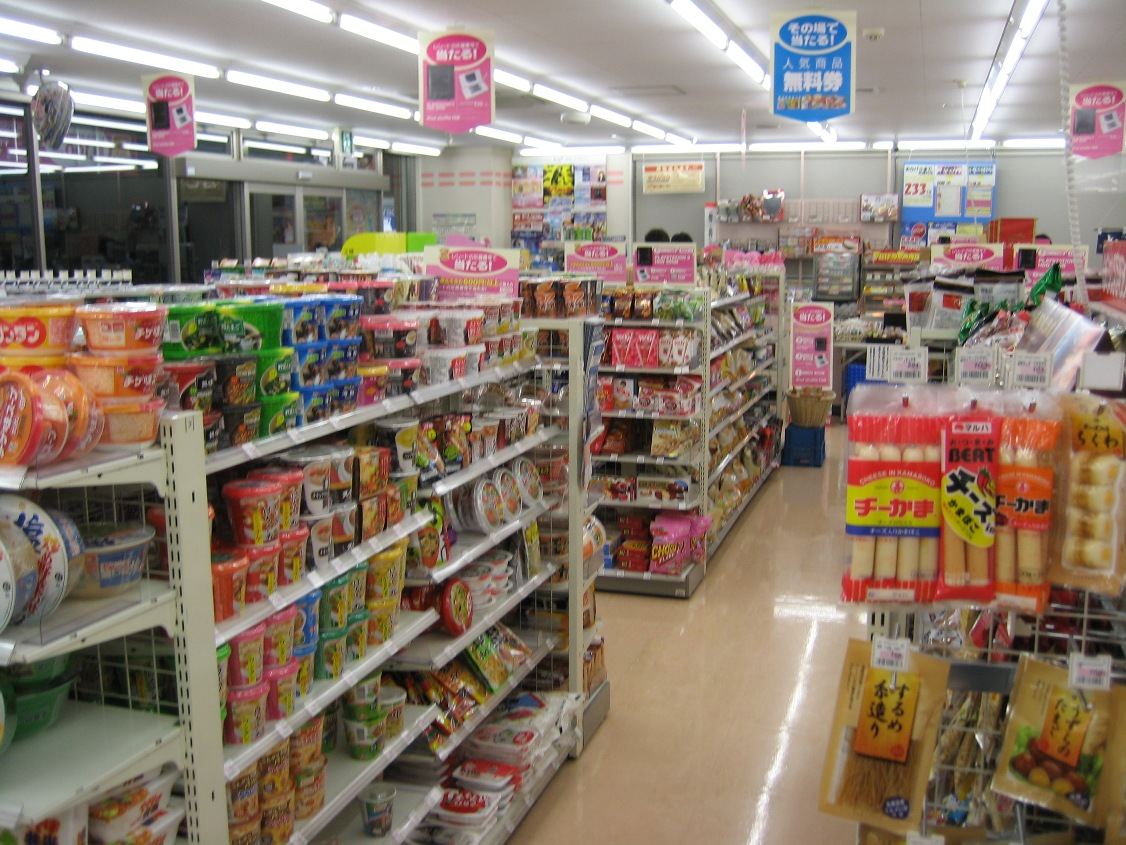
Interior of a Japanese convenience store

Murata herself used to work at a convenience store on a part-time basis. In a profile for The New York Times, the author explained she "wanted to illustrate how odd the people who believe they are ordinary or normal are" and that she admires Keiko's character, who chooses and is fine with not having sex at all. She says that she wanted to write from the perspective of "someone who defied conventional thinking, particularly in a conformist society".

== Reception ==
Joyce Lau of the South China Morning Post gave the novel four out of five stars, calling it a "cutting commentary on the pressure society puts on its citizens, particularly single women." Julie Myerson of The Guardian gave the book a generally positive review, calling it "sublimely weird" and praising the "nutty deadpan prose and even more nuttily likable narrator".

Julie Myerson of The Guardian wrote that while some of the book's characters aren't fully realized, "it's the novel's cumulative, idiosyncratic poetry that lingers, attaining a weird, fluorescent kind of beauty all of its own".

Katy Waldman, for The New Yorker, noted the book's tone: "Murata's flattened prose has a bodega-after-11-P.M. quality: it feels bathed in garish, fluorescent light. If Keiko comes off as frightening and robotic, so does the entire universe in which her story unfurls."

Dwight Garner of The New York Times lauded the translation but also wondered about the impossibility of certain subtleties: "Convenience Store Woman is Murata's 10th novel, and her first to be translated into English. This work has been done adroitly by Ginny Tapley Takemori. She makes any number of good decisions, such as stetting the Japanese term 'freeter', which essentially means 'slacker' or barely employed. Still, one can't help but wonder how many of the subtleties of Murata's stance toward this material are simply untranslatable." However, he questioned the book's relationship of style to substance: "At the same time, it's the kind of performance that leaves you considering the difference between exploring interesting topics and actually being interesting."

Katherine A. Powers, in Star Tribune, said that the novel "is very funny; Keiko's affectless, rather chilly approach lends itself to exquisitely deadpan comedy."

Sarah Gilmartin of The Irish Times wrote that "Ginny Tapley Takemori's skilful translation captures the balance between the quirky and the profound."

The novel won the Akutagawa Prize, and Murata was named one of Vogue Japan's Women of the Year.

== Radio adaptation ==
The novel was adapted into a radio drama on NHK-FM's FM Theater and was broadcast from 22:00 to 22:50 on 30 November 2019. Chiaki Kuriyama voiced the role of the protagonist Keiko Furukura.

== See also ==
- List of Japanese women writers
