= Dalian of Acasia Flowers =

1965 novel by Takayuki Kiyooka

Dalian of Acasia Flowers (in Japanese: アカシヤの大連, literally "Dairen of Acasia") is a novel written by Japanese author Takayuki Kiyooka. It is about a youth and his life in Dalian, China, when it was Japan's leased territory.

Written in 1965, it won an Akutagawa Prize in 1969. Kiyooka wrote this story against a Dalian background, when his first wife, whom he had married in Dalian, died. He also wrote many other stories about Dalian.

== See also ==
- Akutagawa Prize
- Takayuki Kiyooka
