= Akira Abe =

Japanese author (1934-1989)

Akira Abe (阿部昭, Abe Akira; 22 September 1934 – 19 May 1989) was a Japanese writer of short stories and novels.

== Biography ==
Born in Hiroshima and grown up in Kanagawa Prefecture, Abe graduated from the University of Tokyo with a degree in French literature and worked as a director for Radio Tokyo (now TBS) until 1971, when he became a full-time writer.

His literary career began in 1962 with the publication of his debut work Kodomobeya (lit. "Children's room"), for which he received the Bungakukai Newcomer Award (Bungakukai shinjinshō). Most of his stories draw upon his biography and his family in a contemporary I-novel style known as "mental state novel" (shinkyō shōsetsu). Other major works include the 1970 novel Shirei no kyūka (lit. "The commander's holiday") about his military officer father, and the 1972 short story Peaches (Momo), which, like Kodomobeya, deals with personal childhood memories. He received the Mainichi Publishing Culture Award for his 1973 short story Sennen (lit. "Thousand years").

Abe died of heart failure at the age of 54. A fourteen volume edition of his collected works, Abe Akira shū, was published by Iwanami Shoten in 1991–1992.

== Selected works ==
- 1962: Kodomobeya
- 1970: Shirei no kyūka
- 1970: Friends (Hibi no tomo)
- 1972: Peaches (Momo)
- 1973: Sennen
- 1976: Jinsei no ichinichi
- 1982: A Napping Cove (Madoromu irie)

== Translations ==
Of Abe's short stories, Friends, Peaches and A Napping Cove have been translated into English. The novel Shirei no kyūka has been translated into German as Urlaub für die Ewigkeit.
