= Sayaka Murata =

Japanese writer (born 1979)

- 村田沙耶香
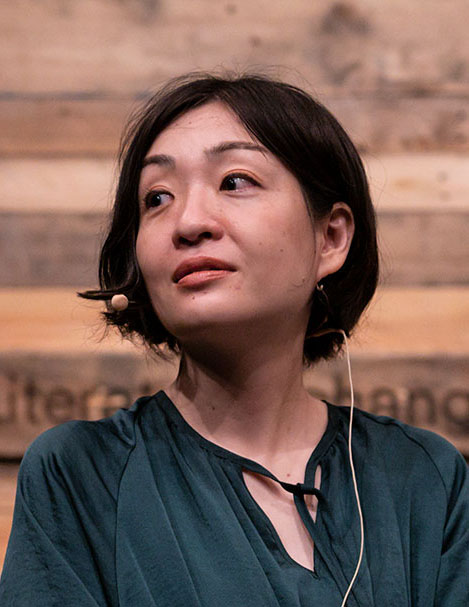
- Murata at the LiteratureXchange Festival in Aarhus, Denmark, in 2022
- Born: August 14, 1979 (age 47)
- Education: Tamagawa University
- Writing career
- Language: Japanese
- Genre: Fiction
- Notable works: Gin'iro no Uta; Shiroiro no Machi no, Sono Hone no Taion no; Convenience Store Woman
- Notable awards: Akutagawa Prize; Mishima Yukio Prize; Noma Literary New Face Prize; Gunzo Prize for New Writers

Sayaka Murata (村田沙耶香 Murata Sayaka; born August 14, 1979) is a Japanese writer. She is best known for the international bestseller Convenience Store Woman (2016) which has been translated into more than thirty languages worldwide. Murata has won many major literary prizes in Japan, including the Gunzo Prize for New Writers in 2003, the Noma Literary New Face Prize in 2009, the Mishima Yukio Prize in 2013, and the Akutagawa Prize for Convenience Store Woman in 2016. All the English translations of her work are done by Ginny Tapley Takemori. In addition to Convenience Store Woman, Murata's first book to be published in English, Takemori has translated the novels Earthlings and Vanishing World, the short-story collection Life Ceremony, the short stories "Faith", "Survival", and "A Clean Marriage", as well as the New York Times published opinion piece "The Future of Sex Lives in All of Us", among others.

Murata's latest book to be published in English is the 2025 novel Vanishing World, originally published in Japan in 2015. Her latest work in Japanese has been the 2022 short-story collection Faith, of which two stories were translated by Takemori individually.

== Biography ==
Murata was born in Inzai, Chiba Prefecture, Japan, in 1979. Her father was a judge and her mother was a housewife. Murata has said she did not have a happy childhood. She started writing stories at age 10. As a child, she often read science fiction and mystery novels borrowed from her brother and mother, and her mother bought her a word processor after she attempted to write a novel by hand in the fourth grade of elementary school. After Murata completed middle school in Inzai, her family moved to Tokyo, where she graduated from Kashiwa High School (attached to Nishogakusha University) and studied art curation at Tamagawa University.

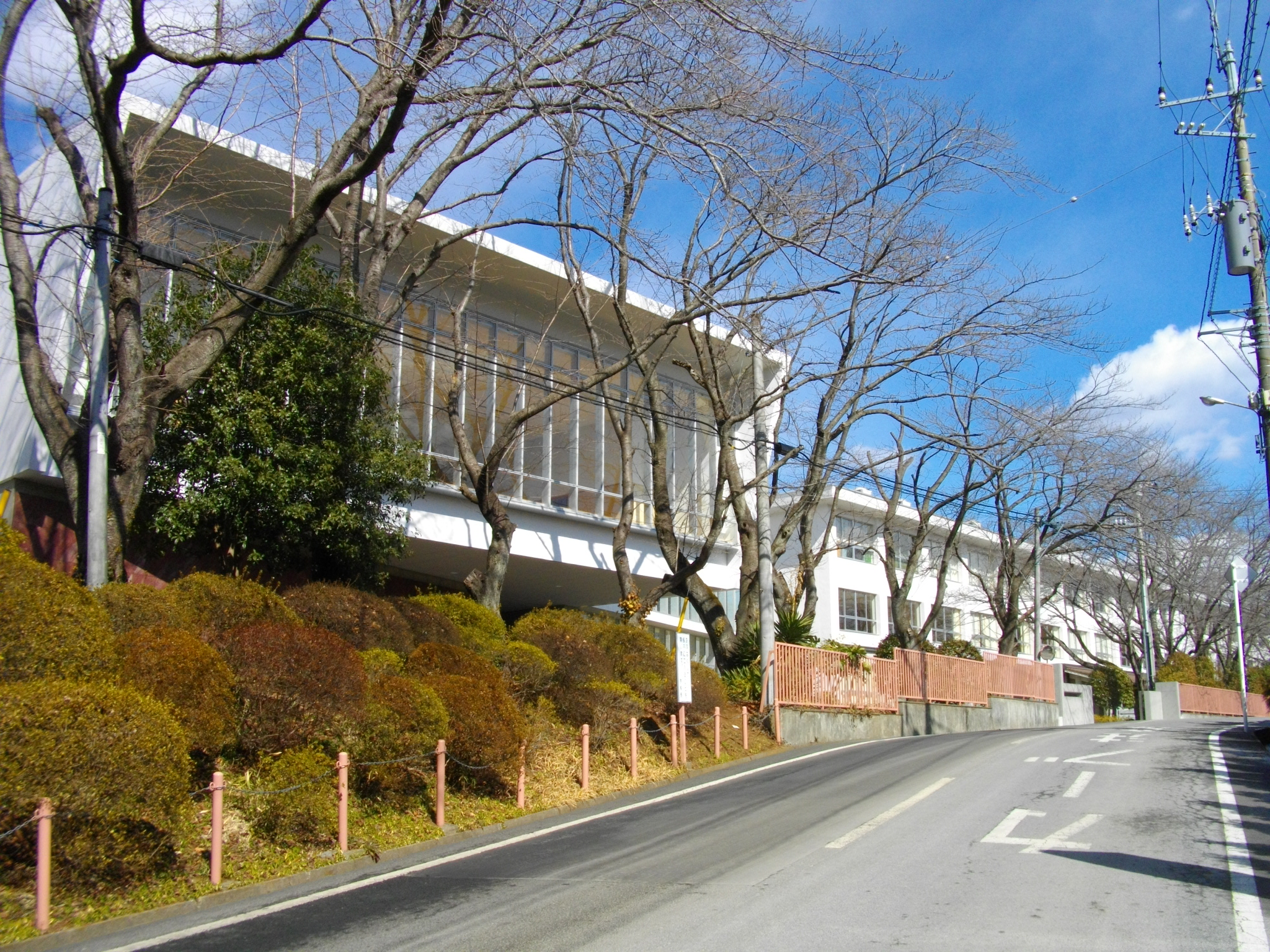
Kashiwa High School

Her first novel, Jyunyū (Breastfeeding), won the 2003 Gunzo Prize for New Writers. In 2013, she won the Mishima Yukio Prize for Shiro-iro no machi no, sono hone no taion no (Of Bones, Of Body Heat, Of Whitening City), and in 2014 the Special Prize of the Sense of Gender Award. In 2016, her 10th novel, Konbini ningen (Convenience Store Woman), won the prestigious Akutagawa Prize, and she was named one of Vogue Japan's Women of the Year. Konbini ningen has sold over 1.5 million copies in Japan and in 2018 it became her first book to be translated into English, under the title Convenience Store Woman. It has been translated into more than 30 languages.

Murata worked part-time as a convenience store clerk in Tokyo for eighteen years until 2017. She has lived in Shinjuku, Tokyo since she was a student.

== Writing style ==
Murata's writing explores the different consequences of nonconformity in society for men and women, particularly with regard to gender roles, parenthood, and sex. Many of the themes and character backstories in her writing come from her daily observations as a part-time convenience store worker. Societal acceptance of sexlessness in various forms, including asexuality, voluntary and involuntary celibacy, especially within marriage, recurs as a theme in several of her works, such as the novels Shōmetsu sekai (Dwindling World) and Konbini ningen (Convenience Store Woman), and the short story "A Clean Marriage." Murata is also known for her frank depictions of adolescent sexuality in work such as Gin iro no uta (Silver Song) and Shiro-iro no machi no, sono hone no taion no (Of Bones, of Body Heat, of Whitening City). In Satsujin shussan, she depicts a future society which may be seen as dystopic.

== Themes ==
=== Challenging taboos ===
Murata often places challenging taboos at the forefront of her most popular works. The title Earthlings focuses on an 11-year-old girl named Natsuki, with her boyfriend and cousin, Yuu, who believe themselves to be aliens due to their tumultuous relationship with their family. The story quickly develops into a harsh tale containing themes of "sexual abuse, murder, and cannibalism." Murata states on challenging taboos: "For example, murder is said to be taboo, but then why is it considered acceptable if it’s legitimate self-defense or capital punishment? I sensed the ambiguity in my childish mind. And I felt a physical repulsion and fear inside me toward incest and cannibalism, although I didn’t know why they were forbidden. I wondered where those emotions came from.” Murata believes that the more she writes about the questioning of these taboos, the closer she will come to the "real truth of things."

=== Conformity ===
The topic of conformity is common in Japanese literature and culture, and Murata frequently questions its validity, especially in Convenience Store Woman. In this novel, Keiko, a part-time convenience store worker, is confronted by societal expectations to marry and pursue a traditional career.

=== Asexuality and fictosexuality ===
Many of Murata's main heroines find themselves in asexual relationships, such as Natsuki in Earthlings and Keiko in Convenience Store Woman. Asexuality is a theme that coincides with questioning the standards society typically expects from citizens, a notion that Murata explores frequently. Murata has stated that "fictosexuality is very strong in [her]" and has written novels that include themes of asexuality and fictosexuality, such as Vanishing World.

=== Global warming and climate change ===
Murata addresses the subject of global warming in her short story, "Survival", which was included in an anthology titled Tales of Two Planets: Stories of Climate Change. The story details a dystopian Japanese society and describes what the world could look like if climate change is left unaddressed.

== Bibliography ==
=== Short story collections ===
Short story collections by Sayaka Murata
Title	Year	Original ISBN	Original publisher	Stories	Notes	Ref(s).
Junyū (授乳; lit. Breastfeeding)	2005	9784062127943	Kodansha	"Junyū" (授乳; "Breastfeeding"); "Koibito" (コイビト; "Sweetheart"); "Otogi no Heya" (御伽の部屋; "The Fairytale Room")		
Gin'iro no Uta (ギンイロノウタ; lit. Silver Song)	2009	9784103100713	Shinchosha	"Hikari no Ashioto" (ひかりのあしおと; "Footsteps of Light"); "Gin'iro no Uta" (ギンイロノウタ; "Silver Song")		
Hoshi ga Sū Mizu (星が吸う水; lit. Water for the Stars)	2010	9784062160971	Kodansha	"Hoshi ga Sū Mizu" (星が吸う水; "Water for the Stars"); "Gamazumi Kōkai" (ガマズミ航海; "Linden Arrowwood Voyage")		
Satsujin Shussan (殺人出産; lit. The Murder Births)	2014	9784062190466	Kodansha	"Satsujin Shussan" (殺人出産; "The Murder Births"); "Triple" (トリプル, Toripuru); "A Clean Marriage" (清潔な結婚, Seiketsu na Kekkon); "Final Days" (余命, Yomei)	"A Clean Marriage" was published in English in Granta 127: Japan in 2014, translated by Ginny Tapley Takemori.; "Final Days" was published in English in Freeman's: Change in 2021, translated by Ginny Tapley Takemori.	
Life Ceremony (生命式, Seimeishiki)	2019	9784309028309	Kawade Shobo Shinsha	"A First-Rate Material" (素敵な素材, Suteki na Sozai); "A Magnificent Spread" (素晴らしい食卓, Subarashī Shokutaku); "A Summer Night's Kiss" (夏の夜の口付け, Natsu no Yoru no Kuchizuke); "Two's Family" (二人家族, Futari Kazoku); "The Time of the Large Star" (大きな星の時間, Ōki na Hoshi no Jikan); "Poochie" (ポチ, Pochi); "Life Ceremony" (生命式, Seimeishiki); "Body Magic" (魔法のからだ, Mahō no Karada); "Lover on the Breeze" (かぜのこいびと, Kaze no Koibito); "Puzzle" (パズル, Pazuru); "Eating the City" (街を食べる, Machi o Taberu); "Hatchling" (孵化, Fuka)	The collection was published in English by Grove Atlantic in 2022 (ISBN 9780802159588), translated by Ginny Tapley Takemori.; "A First-Rate Material" was published in English in Freeman's: The Future of New Writing in 2017, translated by Ginny Tapley Takemori.; "A Summer Night's Kiss" was published in English in Astra: Ecstasy in 2022, translated by Ginny Tapley Takemori.	
Marunouchi Mahō Shōjo Mirakurīna (丸の内魔法少女ミラクリーナ; lit. Mirakurīna, the Marunouchi Magical Girl)	2020	9784041084236	Kadokawa	"Marunouchi Mahō Shōjo Mirakurīna" (丸の内魔法少女ミラクリーナ; "Mirakurīna the Marunouchi Magical Girl"); "Himitsu no Hanazono" (秘密の花園; "Secret Flower Garden"); "Musei Kyōshitsu" (無性教室; "Genderless Classroom"); "Hen'yō" (変容; "Transformation")		
Faith (信仰, Shinkō)	2022	9784163915500	Bungeishunjū	"Faith" (信仰, Shinkō); "Survival" (生存, Seizon); "Tsuchi no Shō Uruoi Okoru" (土脉潤起; "Rain Moistens the Soil") (Note: The name of the first pentad in the usui solar term, corresponding to February 19–23); "Karera no Wakusei e Kaette Iku Koto" (彼らの惑星へ帰っていくこと; "Returning to Their Planet"); "Culture Shock" (カルチャーショック, Karuchā Shokku); "Kimochiyosa Toiu Tsumi" (気持ちよさという罪; "The Sin of Feeling Good"); "Kakanakatta Shōsetsu" (書かなかった小説; "The Story That Wasn't Written"); "Saigo no Tenrankai" (最後の展覧会; "The Last Exhibition")	"Faith" was published in English in Granta: The Online Edition in 2020, translated by Ginny Tapley Takemori.; "Survival" was published in English in Tales of Two Planets in 2022 (ISBN 9780143133926), translated by Ginny Tapley Takemori.	

=== Novels ===
Novels by Sayaka Murata
Title	Year	Original ISBN	Original publisher	Notes	Ref(s).
Mouse (マウス, Mausu)	2008	9784062145893	Kodansha		
Hakobune (ハコブネ; lit. Ark)	2011	9784087714289	Shueisha		
Tadaima Tobira (タダイマトビラ; lit. A Welcoming Door)	2012	9784103100720	Shinchosha		
Shiroiro no Machi no, Sono Hone no Taion no (しろいろの街の、その骨の体温の; lit. Of Bones, of Body Heat, of Whitening City)	2012	9784022510112	Asahi Shimbun		
Shōmetsu Sekai (消滅世界; lit. Dwindling World)	2015	9784309024325	Kawade Shobo Shinsha	Published in English as Vanishing World by Grove Atlantic in 2025 (ISBN 9780802164667), translated by Ginny Tapley Takemori.	
Convenience Store Woman (コンビニ人間, Konbini Ningen)	2016	9784163906188	Bungeishunjū	Published in English by Grove Atlantic in 2018 (ISBN 9780802128256), translated by Ginny Tapley Takemori.	
Earthlings (地球星人, Chikyū Seijin)	2018	9784103100737	Shinchosa	Published in English by Grove Atlantic in 2020 (ISBN 9780802157003), translated by Ginny Tapley Takemori.	
Kawarimi (変半身(かわりみ); lit. Changeability)	2019	9784480804914	Chikuma Shobō		
World 99 (世界99)	2025	9784087718799	Shueisha		

=== Other works ===
- "Chameleon" (photoessay with Tomoko Sawada), English translation by Ginny Tapley Takemori, Granta 144: Art & Photography, 2018.
- "The Future of Sex Lives in All of Us" (article), English translation by Ginny Tapley Takemori, The New York Times, 2019.

== Awards and recognition ==
Year	Prize	Work	Notes	Ref(s).
2003	Gunzo Prize for New Writers	"Junyū"	Won	
2009	Mishima Yukio Prize	Gin'iro no Uta	Nominated	
2009	Noma Literary New Face Prize	Gin'iro no Uta	Won	
2010	Mishima Yukio Prize	Hoshi ga Sū Mizu	Nominated	
2012	Mishima Yukio Prize	Tadaima Tobira	Nominated	
2013	Mishima Yukio Prize	Shiroiro no Machi no, Sono Hone no Taion no	Won	
2014	Sense of Gender Awards	Satsujin Shussan	Won	
2016	Akutagawa Prize	Convenience Store Woman	Won	
