= Otohiko Kaga =

Japanese author (1929–2023)

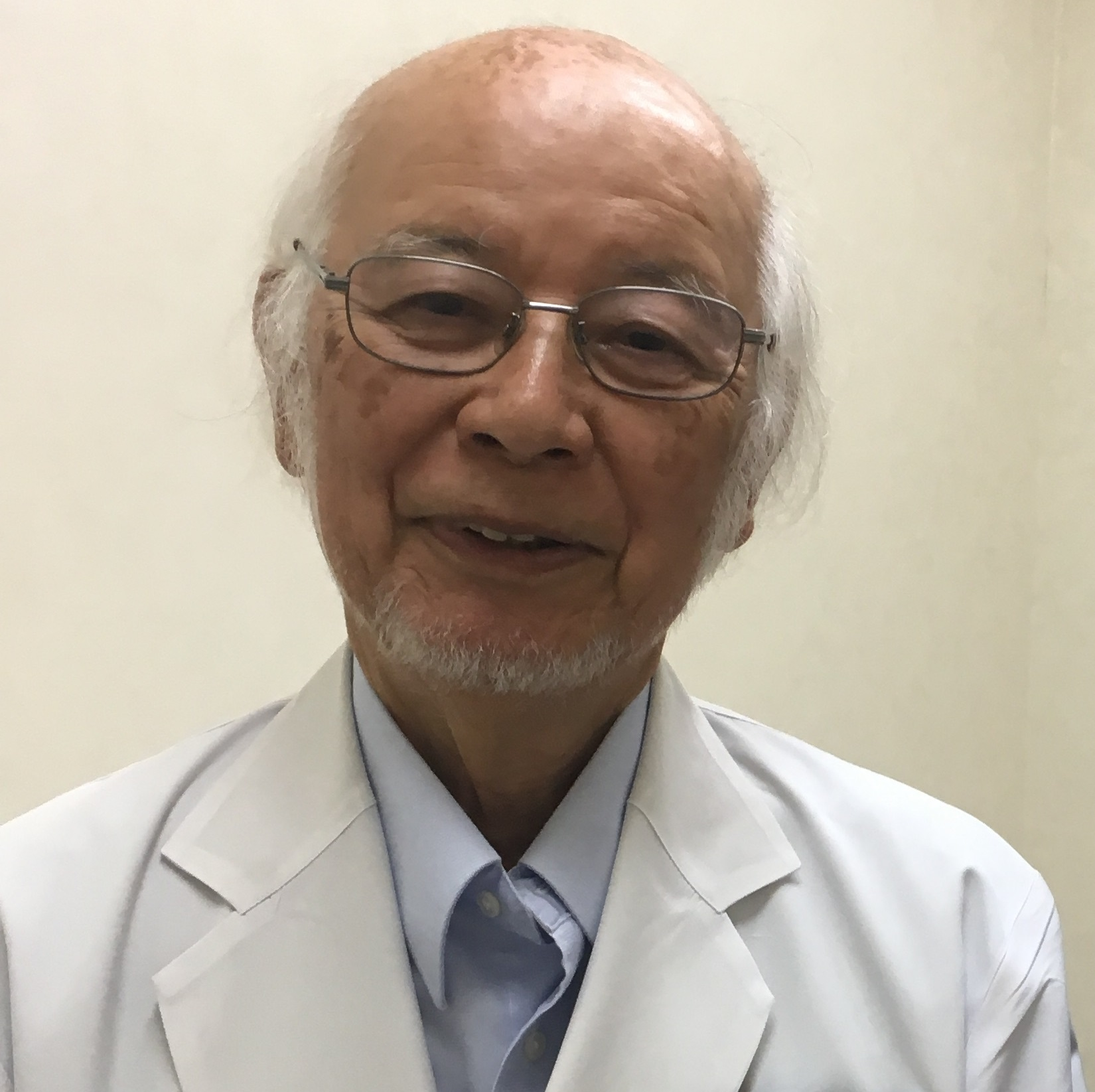
- Kaga in 2017
- Born: Sadataka Kogi; April 22, 1929; Tokyo, Japan
- Died: January 12, 2023 (aged 93)
- Occupation: Writer

Otohiko Kaga (加賀 乙彦, Kaga Otohiko; April 22, 1929 – January 12, 2023) was a Japanese author.

== Biography ==
Kaga was born in Tokyo, and studied psychiatry and criminology at the University of Tokyo Medical School. He worked in a hospital and then prison before going to France in 1957 for further studies. After returning to Japan in 1960, Kaga took up university teaching, and was a psychology professor at the Tokyo Medical and Dental University (1965-1969) and Sophia University (1969 - 1979).

Kaga wrote several novels based on his time in France, including Arechi o tabi suru monotachi (Travelers through the Wasteland) and Furandoru no fuyu (Winter in Flanders) which won the Minister of Education Award for New Artists in 1968. His 1973 novel Kaerazaru natsu (帰らざる夏, A Summer Long Gone), on the tragic consequences of a young man's military indoctrination during World War II received the Tanizaki Prize. His 1982 historical fiction about World War II, Ikari no nai fune (Riding the East Wind), has been translated to English to good reviews.

Kaga was a full-time writer from 1979. In 1987 he converted to Catholicism at the age of 58 through the influence of Shusaku Endo.

Kaga died on January 12, 2023, at the age of 93.

== Major awards ==
- 1968 Minister of Education Award for New Artists for Furandoru no fuyu (Winter in Flanders)
- 1974 Tanizaki Prize for Kaerazaru natsu (帰らざる夏, A Summer Long Gone)
- 1979 Japan Literature Grand Prize for Senkoku (The Verdict)
- 1985 Osaragi Jiro Prize for Shitsugen (The Marsh)
- 2011 Person of Cultural Merit

== Selected works in translation ==
- Riding the East Wind: A Novel of War and Peace (Ikari no nai fune), trans. Ian Hideo Levy, Kodansha America, 2002. ISBN 4-7700-2856-3.
- Marshland (Shitsugen), trans. Albert Novick, Dalkey Archive, 2022. ISBN 9781628974041.
