= Sumito Yamashita =

Japanese playwright and writer

- 山下澄人
- Born: 1966 (age 59–60); Kobe, Japan
- Writing career
- Language: Japanese
- Genre: Fiction
- Notable work: Shinsekai
- Notable awards: Noma Literary Prize (2012); Akutagawa Prize (2016)

Sumito Yamashita (Japanese: 山下澄人; born 1966) is a Japanese playwright and writer.

He was born in Kobe. He was awarded 156th Akutagawa Prize in 2016, for the novel Shinsekai (しんせかい "New World").
