= Kazushi Hosaka =

Japanese writer

Kazushi Hosaka (保坂 和志, Hosaka Kazushi, born 15 October 1956) is a Japanese writer. He has won the Noma Literary New Face Prize, the Akutagawa Prize, and the Tanizaki Prize.

== Biography ==
Hosaka was born in Yamanashi prefecture and received his undergraduate education at Waseda University with a major in political science and economics. After graduating he worked for Seibu Culture Centers, holding popular educational workshops on philosophy. During this period (1990) he published his first book, Plainsong. He left Seibu in 1993 to devote his efforts to writing full-time, with the assistance of fellow writer Nobuo Kojima.

Hosaka writes about ordinary people in ordinary life situations. His work has been compared with the movies of noted director Yasujirō Ozu. A common theme in his writing is the presence of a cat in the lives of his characters.

== Recognition ==
- 1993 15th Noma Literary New Face Prize for Kusa no ue no choshoku (“Breakfast on the Grasses”)
- 1995 113th Akutagawa Prize (1995上) for Kono hito no iki (“The Area of the Person”)
- 1997 33rd Tanizaki Prize for Kisetsu no kioku (Memories of Seasons)
