= Naoyuki Ii =

Japanese novelist (born 1953)

Naoyuki Ii (伊井 直行, Ii Naoyuki; born September 1, 1953) is a noted Japanese author and professor of creative writing at Tokai University's Shonan campus.

== Biography ==
A native of Nobeoka, Miyazaki, Ii graduated in 1978 from Keio University with a degree in history (archaeology and ethnology). His first novel, Kusa no kanmuri (The Grass Radical), was published in 1983, and received the Gunzo Prize for New Writers. Subsequent prizes include:

- 1989 Noma Literary Prize for New Writers, for Sashite juyo denai ichinichi (A Day of Little Importance)
- 1994 Hirabayashi Taiko Prize, for Shinka no tokei (Evolution Clock)
- 2000 Yomiuri Literary Prize, for Nigotta gekiryu ni kakaru hashi (Bridge Over a Muddy Torrent)

== English translations ==
- My visit to the Yubijima Isles, translated by M. Jacob and edited by Harry Aveling, Bundoora, Vic. : La Trobe University, School of Asian Studies, 1996. 18 pages.
- Aoneko kazoku tentenroku (The Shadow of a Blue Cat), translated by Wayne P. Lammers. Champaign, IL and London: Dalkey Archive Press, 2011.
