= Li Kotomi =

Taiwanese fiction writer, translator and essayist

- 李琴峰
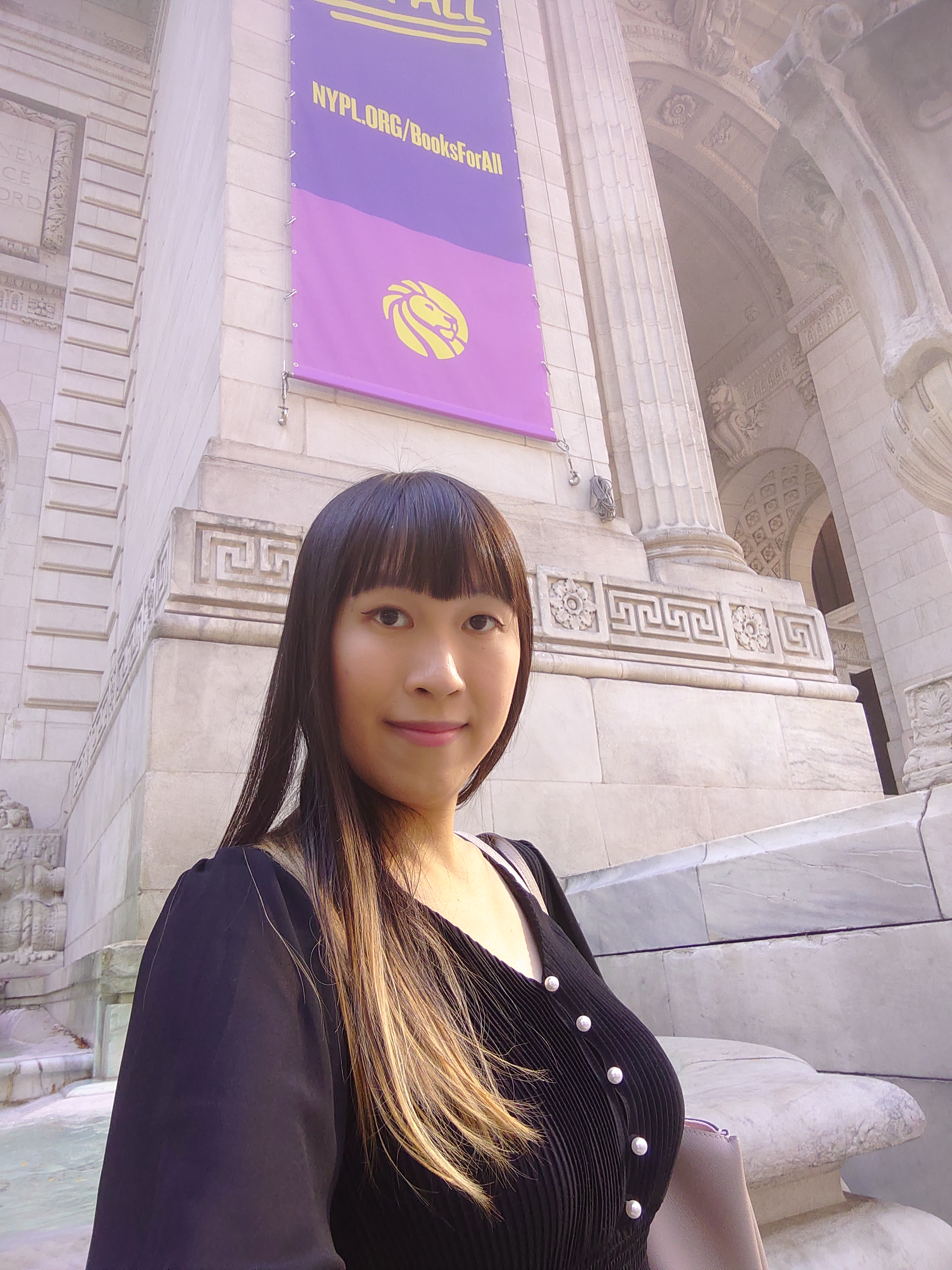
- Born: 26 December 1989 (age 36); Taiwan
- Education: National Taiwan University; Waseda University
- Occupation: Writer
- Writing career
- Language: Japanese, Mandarin
- Genre: Fiction
- Notable works: Hitorimai (Solo Dance) (独り舞); Itsutsu kazoereba mikazuki ga (五つ数えれば三日月が)
- Notable awards: Gunzo Prize for New Writers; Akutagawa Prize

Li Kotomi (李琴峰, born on 26 December 1989), is the pen name of a Taiwanese fiction writer, translator, and essayist in Mandarin and Japanese. Her native language is Mandarin Chinese, but her novels are predominantly written in Japanese. Her literary career began in 2017 with the Japanese novel titled Hitorimai (Chinese: 獨舞 English: Solo Dance), which received the 60th Gunzo Prize for New Writers that year. Her novel Higanbana ga saku shima (An Island Where Red Spider Lilies Bloom) received the 165th Akutagawa Prize, which was established in 1935 in commemoration of Ryūnosuke Akutagawa.

== Early life ==
Li Kotomi was born on 26 December 1989, in Taiwan. She studied Japanese when she was 15 years old. She thinks the more she knows Japanese, the more interesting it is. Her elementary school teacher was dissatisfied with her because Japan had colonized Taiwan.

She also tried to create novels in Chinese concurrently with learning Japanese. She enrolled at National Taiwan University and graduated from the Department of Chinese Literature and Japanese Literature. In 2013, she came to Japan to study for a master's degree in the Department of Japanese Language and Literature at Waseda University.

== Literary career ==
Following graduation, she moved to Japan to study for a master's degree in the Department of Japanese Language and Literature at Waseda University in 2013. She has been living there since, receiving her permanent residency in 2018. Following graduation, she started working for a general corporation. While commuting to work on the train, she came up with the idea for her debut novel, Hitorimai (Chinese: 獨舞 English: Solo Dance), which was awarded the Gunzo Prize for New Writers in 2017.

She left her company in 2018 and has become a freelance writer and translator, working mostly from Japanese to Chinese. She has translated her Japanese novels into Chinese herself and published them in Taiwan. In addition to writing novels, she has translated novels, essays, contracts, tourist information, comics, smartphone games, and newspaper articles.

In 2019, her novel Itsutsu kazoereba mikazuki ga (Count to Five and See the Crescent Moon) was nominated for the 161th Akutagawa Ryunosuke Prize and the 41st Noma Literary Prize.Her 2021 novel Higanbana ga saku shima (Chinese: 彼岸花盛開之島 English: An Island Where Red Spider Lilies Bloom) was nominated for the Mishima Yukio Prize and received the 165th Akutagawa Prize.

Porarisu ga furisosogu yoru (The Night of the Shining North Star, published in February 2020) received the Art Encouragement Newcomer Award. This series of short stories is set in Shinjuku Ni-chome and depicts the comings and goings of various people—people with diverse sexual identities, foreigners living in Japan, and others—intertwined with themes of national identity, history, and culture. She won the 2021 Akutagawa Prize for Higanbana ga saku shima (The Island Where Red Spider Lilies Bloom) This novel is set on an island where traditional family structures are dismantled, and women known as "noro" govern the society with a language exclusive to women. Toumei na maku o hedatenagara, published in August 2022, is a collection of essays she had written for over four years, from her debut years, 2017 to 2022, when she received the Akutagawa Prize.

Since her debut, she has consistently written her works in close contact with modern society, including life and death, sexual diversity (LGBT, sexual minorities, etc.), nationality, language, and history and politics that are based on it. Also, Li Kotomi recently spoke at the International Conference on Open Access to Culture (held from 28 June – 7 July 2022) during Plenary Session 2, "A Dialogue in Diversity: Inclusion of Differences, Prospects in Cultural Collaboration".

== Personal life ==
In November 2024, Li publicly came out as a transgender woman after being outed on social media. She said that she "fled to Japan in 2013 after she experienced bullying and discrimination because she was transgender" and that she "could not live with peace of mind in Taiwan". She is also a lesbian.

== Selected works ==
=== In Japanese ===
Japanese title	Rōmaji	English	Year of publication	Notes
独舞	Hitorimai	Solo Dance	2018	Winner of the 60th Gunzo New Writers Award for Excellence
五つ数えれば三日月が	Itsutsu kazoereba mikazuki ga	Count to Five and See the Crescent Moon	2019	Nominated for the 161th Akutagawa Prize and Noma Bungei New Writers Award.
ポラリスが降り注ぐ夜	Porarisu ga furisosogu yoru	The Night Polaris Shone Down	2020	Received the 71st Education Minister's Art Encouragement New Awards.
星月夜（ほしつきよる）	Hoshi tsuki yoru	Starry Moonlit Night	2020	
彼岸花が咲く島	Higanbana ga saku shima	The Island Where Red Spider Lilies Bloom	2021	Winner of the 165th Akutagawa Prize; nominated for the Mishima Yukio Prize.
生を祝う	Sei o iwau	Celebrating Life	2021	Received the 71st Education Minister's Art Encouragement New Awards.
透明な膜を隔てながら	Toumei na maku o hedatenagara	Separated by a Transparent Membrane	2022	A collection of essays originally written from 2017 to 2021.
観音様の環	Kan'onsama no wa	The Ring of Avalokiteśvara	2023	
肉を脱ぐ	Niku o nugu	Remove the Flesh	2023	
言霊の幸う国で	Kotodama no sakiwau kuni de	In a Country Blessed with Words	2024	The Nation due to Grace En-Yi Ting
シドニーの虹に誘われて	Shidonī no niji ni izanawarete	Beckoned by a Sydney Rainbow	2024	

=== In Translation ===
- Solo Dance, translated by Arthur Reiji Morris(2022, World Editions)
- L'isola dei gigli rossi, translated by Anna Specchio (2023, Mondadori)
- Se vuoi nascere o no, translated by Anna Specchio (2025, Mondadori)
