= Tomie Ōhara =

Japanese novelist

- 大原 富枝
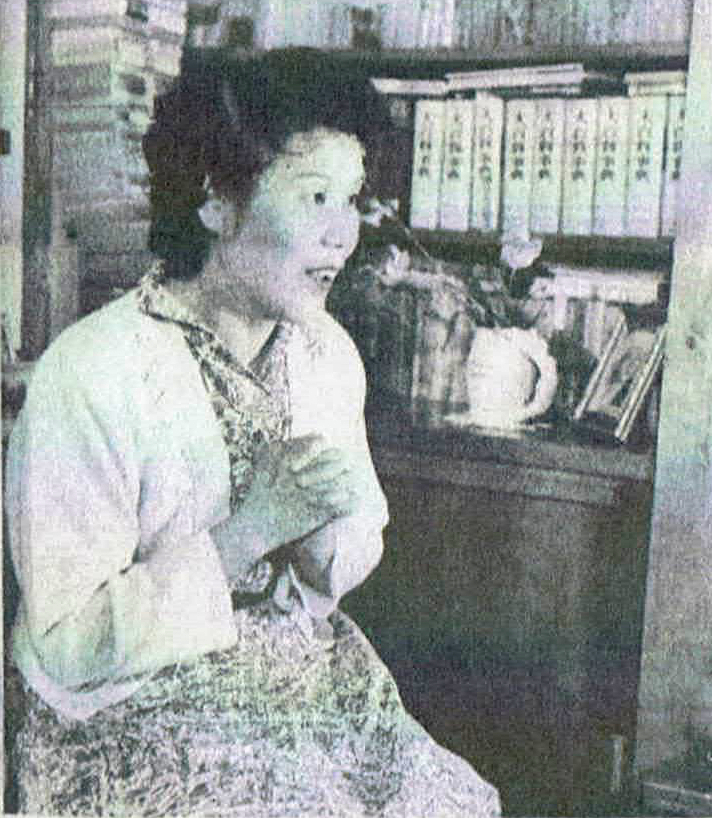
- Born: 28 September 1912
- Died: 27 February 2000 (aged 87)
- Occupation: Novelist

Tomie Ōhara (大原 富枝; September 28, 1912 – January 27, 2000) was a Japanese novelist. She is best known for her novel A Woman Called En.

== Early life and education ==
Ōhara was born in Kochi, Japan on September 28, 1912. Her father was the principal of an elementary school and had an extensive library that she was welcome to read in. Her mother died when she was 10 years old. She studied at Kochi Joshi Shihan Gakko from 1927 to 1930 but dropped out when she contracted tuberculosis. She did not leave the sanatorium until 1938.

== Career ==
Ōhara's writing career began when she was recovering from tuberculosis in the sanatorium. She finished writing her first story in 1935. However, she only began gaining attention as a writer with her 1938 story Shuku Shussei (祝出征), which was shortlisted for the Akutagawa Prize. She then became a member of the Bungei Shuto magazine in 1941, after moving to Tokyo.

Her tuberculosis recurred in 1955 and lasted until 1957. She published a short story collection in 1957 titled Sutomai Tsunbo (ストマイつんぼ), which won the Women's Literature Award. The stories in the collection are about patients living in a sanatorium.

She then wrote "A Woman called En" (婉という女, En to iu onna) in 1960. It won the Mainichi Publishing Culture Award and the Noma Literary Prize. Her novel Oyuki: Tosa Ichijo-ke no Hokai (於雪－土佐一條家の崩壊), which was published in 1970, also won the Women's Literature Award.

In 1976 Ōhara converted to Catholicism. Her new religion had a clear influence on some of her later books.

In 1990 she was awarded the Order of the Sacred Treasure, 3rd class. The Ōhara Tomie Museum of Literature opened in 1991. She was named a member of the Japan Art Academy in 1998. Ōhara died on January 27, 2000.
