= Hideo Takubo =

Hideo Takubo (田久 保英夫, Takubo Hideo; January 25, 1928 - April 14, 2001) was a noted Japanese author. He studied French literature at Keio University, and won the 61st Akutagawa Prize in 1969 for Fukaikawa (Deep River), the 37th Yomiuri Prize in 1985 for Kaizu, and the 50th Noma Literary Prize in 1997 for Kodamashu.
