= Ginny Tapley Takemori =

British translator of Japanese literature

Ginny Tapley Takemori is a British translator of contemporary Japanese literature based in Ibaraki, Japan. She is the English translator of Convenience Store Woman by Sayaka Murata, among other novels and works. Tapley Takemori was involved in the creation of Women in Translation Month, and led a series of articles published on LitHub called 10 Women Authors We Want to See Published, that highlighted untranslated women authors from a given language. She is also a co-founder of a freelance women literary translator collection called Strong Women, Soft Power, along with Allison Markin Powell and Lucy North.

== Biography ==
After spending her early years living in Tanzania, Tapley Takemori moved to Barcelona in the 1980s after graduating from high school. Prior to beginning her career as a full-time freelance translator of Japanese, she worked at the Ute Korner Literary Agency in Barcelona and translated works from Spanish and Catalan. The agency she worked at represented the Japan Foreign Rights Centre and she sold the translation rights to books including The Friends by Kazumi Yumoto. This motivated her to study Japanese and she obtained a Bachelor of Arts in Japanese from SOAS University of London and a Master of Arts from the University of Sheffield. She also worked as an editor at the Japanese publishing house Kodansha. She published her first translated story in 2008 in the online magazine Words Without Borders.

As a translator, Tapley Takemori has translated over a dozen Japanese authors, including Murata, Kyoko Nakajima, and Mayumi Inaba.

== Selected works ==
=== Children's books ===
- Inui, Tomiko (2015). The Secret of the Blue Glass. Translated by Tapley Takemori, Ginny. ISBN 978-1-78269-034-4. OCLC 919220170.

=== Novels ===
- Inaba, Mayumi (2025). Mornings without Mii. Translated by Tapley Takemori, Ginny. ISBN 978-0-374-61478-2. OCLC 1431882173.
- Miyabe, Miyuki (2014). Puppet Master. Translated by Tapley Takemori, Ginny.
- Murakami, Ryū (2013). From the Fatherland, with Love. Translated by McCarthy, Ralph; de Wolff, Charles; Tapley Takemori, Ginny. ISBN 978-1-908968-49-4.
- Murata, Sayaka (2018). Convenience Store Woman. Translated by Tapley Takemori, Ginny. ISBN 978-0-8021-2962-8. OCLC 1055687262.
- Murata, Sayaka (2020). Earthlings. Translated by Tapley Takemori, Ginny. ISBN 978-0-8021-5700-3. OCLC 1181840856.
- Murata, Sayaka (2025). Vanishing World. Translated by Tapley Takemori, Ginny. ISBN 978-0-8021-6466-7. OCLC 1457231144.
- Nakajima, Kyoko (2019). The Little House. Translated by Tapley Takemori, Ginny. ISBN 978-1-85077-316-0. OCLC 1102538756.
- Nosaka, Akiyuki (2018). The Cake Tree in the Ruins. Translated by Tapley Takemori, Ginny. ISBN 978-1-78227-418-6. OCLC 1022085029.
- Nosaka, Akiyuki (2025). Grave of the Fireflies. Translated by Tapley Takemori, Ginny. ISBN 978-0-241-78021-3. OCLC 1483639627.

=== Short story collections ===
- Murata, Sayaka (2022). Life ceremony: stories. Translated by Tapley Takemori, Ginny. ISBN 978-0-8021-5958-8. OCLC 1314126461.
- Nakajima, Kyoko (2021). Things remembered and things forgotten. Translated by McCullough MacDonald, Ian; Tapley Takemori, Ginny. ISBN 978-1-908745-96-5.
- Nishimura, Kyōtarō (2013). The Isle of South Kamui and Other Stories. Translated by Tapley Takemori, Ginny. ISBN 978-1-78308-011-3. OCLC 852831510.
- Otowa, Rebecca (2020). The Mad Kyoto Shoe Swapper and Other Stories. Translated by Tapley Takemori, Ginny. Tuttle Publishing. ISBN 978-1-4629-2146-1. OCLC 1139329339.
- Shinkai, Makoto; Nagakawa, Naruki (2022). She and Her Cat. Translated by Tapley Takemori, Ginny. ISBN 978-1-982165-74-1. OCLC 1350742675.
