= Junzo Shono =

Japanese novelist

Junzō Shōno
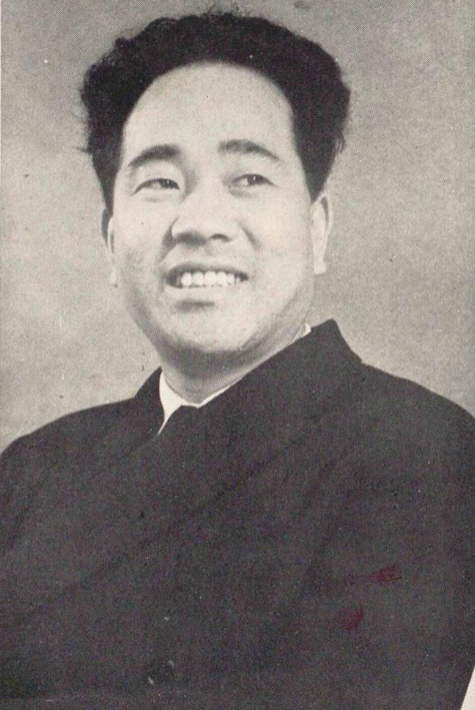
- Born: 9 February 1921; Osaka, Japan
- Died: 21 September 2009 (aged 88); Kawasaki, Japan
- Citizenship: Japanese
- Occupation: Writer
- Writing career
- Period: 1953 - 2006
- Genres: Fiction, novels
- Notable awards: Akutagawa Prize; 1954; Yomiuri Prize; 1965; Noma Literary Prize

Junzō Shōno (庄野 潤三, Shōno Junzō; 9 February 1921 – 21 September 2009) was a Japanese novelist. A native of Osaka, he began writing novels after World War II. He won the 1954 Akutagawa Prize for his book Purusaido Shokei (Poolside Scene). Shōno's other award-winning books include Seibutsu (Still Life), for which he won the Shinchosha literary prize, Yube no Kumo (Evening Clouds), which was awarded the 1965 Yomiuri Prize, and Eawase (Picture Cards) which took the Noma literary prize.

== Biography ==
Shōno lived for one year in the United States in the late 1950s on a fellowship from the Rockefeller Foundation at Kenyon College in Ohio. He later published a book, Gambia Taizaiki about his experiences at Kenyon.

Shōno was made a member of the Japan Art Academy in 1978. He died of natural causes at his home in Kawasaki on September 21, 2009. Shōno was 88.

== Works ==
in English

- Still Life and Other Stories (1992)
