= Takayuki Kiyooka =

Japanese writer

Takayuki Kiyooka (清岡 卓行, Kiyooka Takayuki; July 29, 1922 - June 3, 2006) was a Japanese poet and novelist. He was born in Dalian, China, while it was Japan's leased territory, spent his youth there, and is noted for his stories about the life in Dalian. He received the Akutagawa Prize in 1969, for his story, Dalian of Acasia Flowers.

He was married to Keiko Iwasaka.

== Major works ==
- Frozen Frames (氷った焔, Kōtta honō, 1959)
- Dalian of Acasia Flowers (1969)
- Sakharov's Fantasy (サハロフの幻想, Sakharov no genbō, 1969)
