= Mimei Ogawa =

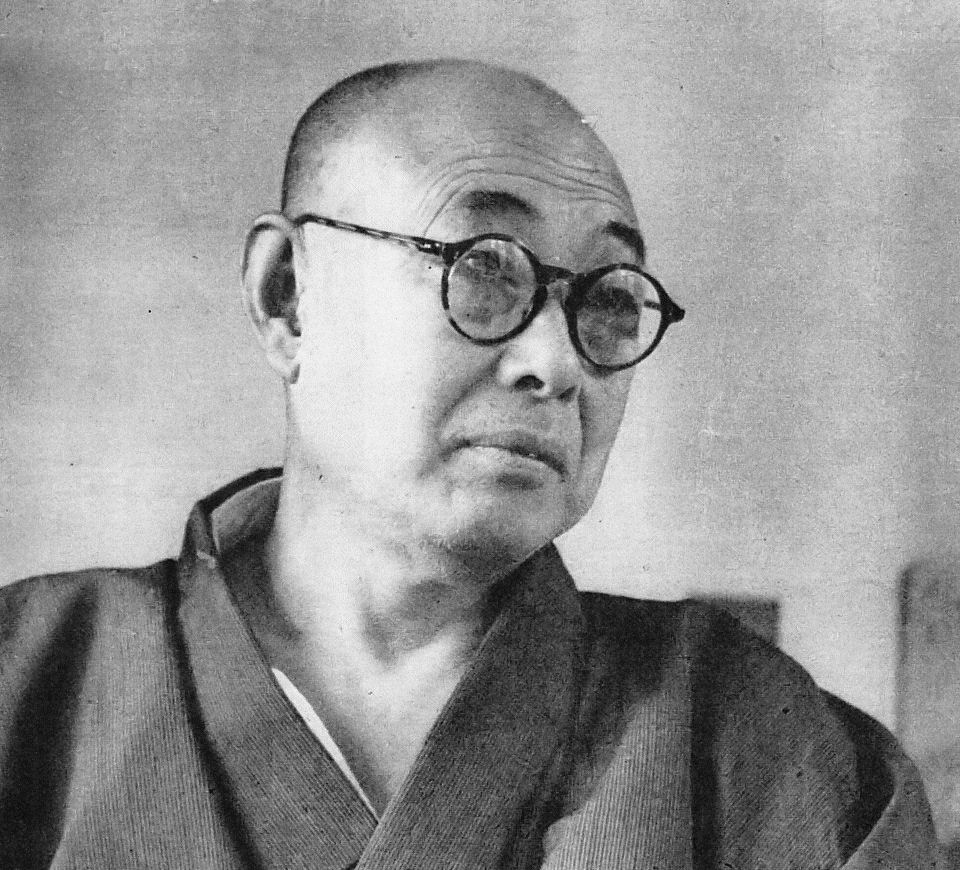
Mimei Ogawa

Mimei Ogawa (小川 未明, Ogawa Mimei; born Ogawa Kensaku in April 7, 1882, in Joetsu, Niigata, died May 11, 1961, in Tokyo), also called Ogawa Bimei, was an author of short stories, children's stories, and fairy tales. Because he was one of the first authors to publish children's stories under his own name, Ogawa has been called Japan's Hans Christian Andersen, an appellation he shares with Kurushima Takehiko.

== Life ==
Ogawa studied at the Faculty of English Literature at Waseda University, where he graduated in 1905. That same year, Ogawa published his first literary work. Waseda University was at that time the center of the Japanese Naturalism movement. In 1910 Ogawa published his first fairy tale.

== Work ==
Ogawa is known in Japan as the founder of modern children's literature. Ogawa often chose everyday scenarios for his children's stories. Two of his most famous stories are The Mermaid and the Red Candles and The Cow Woman. The Cow Woman, published in 1919, described a mother whose soul could not rest after her death, because her son was left in wretched poverty. The mother appears to her son in different apparitions to help lead him down the right path.

Ogawa's stories often incorporate religious and philosophical symbolism and the cycle of life. The death of creatures is not final, but is instead just the opportunity to appear in a different form, such as in The Cow Woman.
