= Seiji Shimota =

Japanese leftist novelist (1913–2003)

Seiji Shimota 霜多 正次
- Born: September 5, 1913; Nakijin, Okinawa, Empire of Japan
- Died: April 12, 2003 (aged 89); Musashino, Tokyo, Japan
- Occupation: Novelist

Seiji Shimota (霜多正次, Shimota Seiji; September 5, 1913 – April 16, 2003) was a Japanese novelist.

Born in Nakijin, Okinawa, he attended local elementary and middle schools, but continued his high school education in Kumamoto, where he began writing novels and studied with Haruo Umezaki. He graduated from the School of English Literature, Literature Department of Tokyo Imperial University.

In 1940, he was conscripted and sent to Bougainville Island. Towards the end of the war, in May 1945, he surrendered to Australian forces and was sent to a POW camp.

After being released, he did not return to Okinawa (which at the time was occupied by the Americans), but went to Tokyo instead, where he wrote novels while working in the offices of Shin Nihon Bungakukai ("New Japan Literature Society"), a leftist writers' association. In 1950, he published Kiyama ittō-hei to senkyōshi ("Private Kiyama and the Missionary") in the magazine "Shin Nihon Bungaku" and established himself as a writer.

In 1953, he returned for a visit for the first time after the war to Okinawa, and started using Okinawan themes in his writings. For the novel Okinawashima, which was published in installments in Shin Nihon Bungaku ("New Japanese Literature") in 1956, he was awarded the "Mainichi Publications Literary Award".

In 1957, with fellow writers Tatsukichi Nishino, Kim Tal-su and Sei Kubota, he started the Riarizumu Kenkyukai ("Realism Research Association"). He was expelled from the New Japan Literature Society after relations between him and Teruo Takei, the de facto leader of the Society, were soured by ideological differences. At a conference in 1964, Shimota disagreed with other executives of the Society on numerous issues, such as in regard to the Partial Nuclear Test Ban Treaty, in which he took the Japanese Communist Party's position on the issue.

When the Nippon minshushugi bungaku domei ("Japanese Democratic Literary Alliance") was established in 1965, he was named vice-chairman. In 1971, he was awarded the Takiji-Yuriko Award for Akemodoro.

He died of pneumonia in Musashino, Tokyo, on April 16, 2003.

== Awards ==
- Mainichi Shuppan Bungaku Sho for Okinawashima (1956)
- Takiji-Yuriko Award for Akemodoro (1971)
