= Ken Hirano =

Japanese literary critic

- 平野 謙
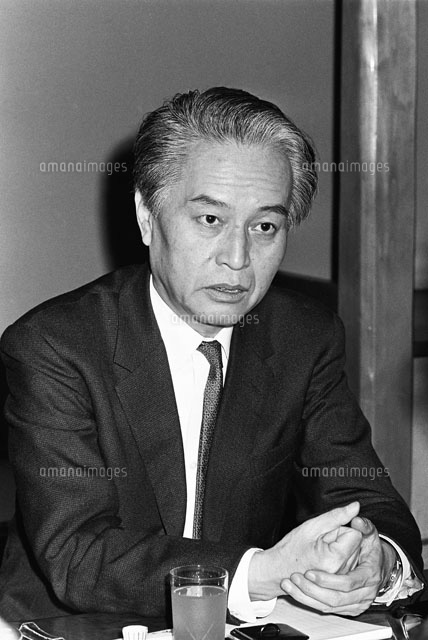
- Born: October 30, 1910; Kamigyō-ku, Kyoto, Empire of Japan
- Died: April 3, 1978 (aged 67); Setagaya, Tokyo, Japan
- Education: Tokyo Imperial University
- Occupation: Literary critic
- Known for: The "politics and literature debate" (1946-1947); the "Parutai debate" (1960); the "pure literature debate" (1961-1962)
- Notable work: Shōwa bungaku shi ("A History of Shōwa Literature," 1959)

Ken Hirano (平野 謙, Hirano Ken; October 30, 1910 – April 3, 1978) was the pen name of a prominent Japanese literary critic and longtime professor of literature at Meiji University. His real name was Akira Hirano (平野 朗, Hirano Akira).

Hirano was one of the seven founders of the journal Kindai Bungaku ("Modern Literature"), and played a starring role in the "politics and literature debates" of the 1940s and 1950s, as well as the "pure literature debate" of the early 1960s. In 1977, he was awarded the prestigious Imperial Prize from the Japan Art Academy.

== Early life and education ==
Ken Hirano was born Akira Hirano in Kyoto, Japan on October 30, 1910. His father was a Buddhist monk who wrote literary criticism on the side. When he was five years old, Hirano's family moved to Gifu prefecture, where he grew up. As a teenager, Hirano refused his father's wish that he follow in his footsteps and become a monk, and instead enrolled in Eighth High School in Nagoya, where he was classmates with Shūgo Honda and Shizuo Fujieda.

In 1930, Hirano enrolled at Tokyo Imperial University, but dropped out in 1933, before re-enrolling in 1937 and graduating with a degree in literature in 1940. During his university years, Hirano became involved in illegal Marxist organizing as well as the Proletarian literature movement, but distanced himself from these activities as state repression ramped up in wartime. After graduating, Hirano spent part of World War II working in the Cabinet Information Bureau.

== Career as a literary critic ==
In 1945, Hirano co-founded the influential literary journal Kindai Bungaku, along with Shūgo Honda, Yutaka Haniya, Masahito Ara, Kiichi Sasaki, Hideo Odagiri, and Shizuka Yamamuro.

In 1946, Hirano touched off the so-called "politics and literature debate" (seiji to bungaku ronsō) when he published his essay "Hitotsu no hansōtei" ("An Antithesis") in the journal Shinseikatsu. Thereafter, a vigorous debate emerged between the proletarian writers affiliated with the New Japanese Literature Association (Shin Nihon Bungakkai) and those affiliated with Hirano's Kindai Bungaku group. Hirano called for the proletarian writers in the New Japanese Literature Association to carry out more thoroughgoing self-reflection regarding their wartime responsibility. More importantly, Hirano criticized the "primacy of politics" (seiji no yūisei) in their literature, and called for a more diverse literature that honored each author's individuality. Hirano was supported in his stance by Masahito Ara, Kiichi Sasaki, Hideo Odagiri, and others, and was vigorously opposed by Nakano Shigeharu, Korehito Kurahara, and others associated with the New Japanese Literature Association.

From 1950 Hirano accepted a position as a professor of literature at newly-formed Sagami Women's University. In 1957, he moved to Meiji University, where he taught until his death in 1978.

In 1960, Hirano set off the so-called "Parutai debate" (Parutai ronsō) when he wrote a glowing review of previously unknown author Yumiko Kurahashi's short story "Parutai" ("The Party"), a satirical piece which acutely mocked the bureaucratic dogmatism of Japan Communist Party (although not mentioning it directly by name), and then used his influence to have the story republished in the prominent literary magazine Bungakukai. In literary journals, Japanese writers and critics debated whether Kurahashi's story had any "literary merit" and the propriety of Hirano's promoting it, in what became a proxy war for competing views on the influence of the Communist Party in the literary world. Historian Nick Kapur argues that the Parutai debate also reflected unspoken displeasure within the male-dominated literary world that a critic as prominent as Hirano was promoting the work of a young female author, in their view at the expense of males.

In September 1961, Hirano launched the so-called "pure literature debate" (junbungaku ronsō) when he published a very short piece in which he wrote, almost as an aside, that much-vaunted "pure literature" was "nothing but a historical concept" (rekishiteki gainen ni suginai). The context for this remark was the growing popularity of genre fiction, in particular, detective novels by authors such as Seichō Matsumoto and Tsutomu Mizukami, and the resultant hand-wringing by Japanese literary figures that junbungaku, meaning "pure" or "highbrow" literature written purposefully as art and not to make money, was being rapidly supplanted by debased genre fare. In response to these fears, Hirano argued that so-called junbungaku was not a timeless and universal concept but rather a term specifically grounded in the politics of the immediate prewar and postwar periods and used to justify why certain books were acceptable and others were not. Hirano argued that certain high-quality genre fiction was worthy of consideration as artistic work. Hirano's stance sparked a wide-ranging debate in Japanese literary journals as to whether genre fiction (taishū bungaku, literally "mass literature") had any artistic merit. Critics accused Hirano of "making eyes at genre fiction" which he denied. The critic Jun Etō called Hirano "an incurable romantic, a perpetual youth, a boy who never grew up," and the author Jun Takami called him a "snake in the grass," in other words, an enemy of "pure" literature who was only pretending to be a serious literary critic. Nevertheless, Hirano's startling assertion about the historical nature of junbungaku, and the debate that ensued, helped make room for new types of literature that did not conform to the narrow definition of "pure literature" to be more widely appreciated in artistic terms.

In 1959, Hirano published an influential history of Japanese literature from the 1920s through the 1950s, Shōwa bungaku shi ("A History of Shōwa Literature"), which was deeply rooted in his own personal experiences.

In 1977, Hirano was awarded the prestigious Imperial Prize from the Japan Art Academy in recognition of his lifetime achievements in the field of literary criticism.

Hirano died on April 3, 1978, of a subarachnoid hemorrhage.

== Posthumous criticism ==
In the 1980s, literary critic Jun Etō harshly criticized a number of articles that Hirano had written during his time working for the Cabinet Information Bureau. Etō believed these articles demonstrated Hirano's support for the war effort, and rendered hypocritical Hirano's calls for other writers to accept their own wartime responsibility.
