= Teruo Takei =

Japanese literary critic

- 武井 昭夫
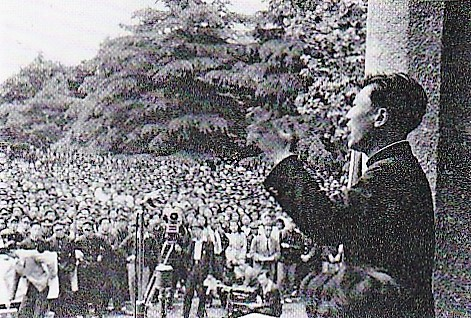
- Teruo Takei speaking to student activists, May 1949
- Born: January 29 1927; Yokohama, Empire of Japan
- Died: September 2, 2010; Kawasaki, Japan
- Occupation: Literary critic
- Known for: First chairman of Zengakuren
- Notable work: Sō to shite no gakusei undō ("The Student Movement as a Social Stratum"); Bungakusha no sengo sekinin ("The War Responsibility of Literary Figures")

Teruo Takei (武井 昭夫, Takei Teruo; January 29 1927 – September 2, 2010) was a Japanese literary critic. While a student at the University of Tokyo, he played a central role in the founding of the nationwide student federation Zengakuren, and served as its first chairman. As a literary critic, he was at the forefront of a movement to demand that writers confront their own culpability in wartime collaboration.

== Early life and education ==
Teruo Takei was born in Yokohama on January 29, 1927. In 1946, he joined the Japanese Communist Party (JCP), which had just become legal under the U.S.-led occupation of Japan. While a student in western history at the University of Tokyo in 1948, he played a key role in the formation of the nationwide student federation Zengakuren, and served as its first chairman. Takei dropped out of university before graduating, in order to focus on activism. In 1950, The JCP issued a criticism of Takei's leadership of Zengakuren, asserting that the emphasis on "flashy" protests was undermining popular support for the party. Takei responded by propounding his "theory of the student movement as a social stratum" (sō to shite no gakusei undō), in which he argued that university students could become the main political subject of the class struggle, as a separate social stratum independent from party leadership and the working classes. In 1950, Takei also opposed the militant line the JCP took in response to a directive from Joseph Stalin. As a result of these transgressions, Takei was expelled from the party.

== Career as a literary critic ==
In 1952, Takei joined the New Japanese Literature Association (Shin Nihon Bungakkai), and became a member of the editorial staff of its journal, New Japanese Literature (Shin Nihon Bungaku), writing literary, art, and film criticism. However, in 1954, he resigned in protest from the journal's editorial board when the JCP forced out the journal's editor-in-chief, Kiyoteru Hanada, in a dispute over editorial policy.

In 1955, during a period of reconciliation, Takei was reinstated as a member of the Communist Party. He rejoined the New Japanese Literature Association and resumed his duties at the journal. In 1956, Takei made waves when he co-authored a tract with the poet and critic Takaaki Yoshimoto titled "The War Responsibility of Literary Figures" (Bungakusha no sengo sekinin). In 1958, he co-founded the journal Contemporary Criticism (Gendai hihyo) with Takaaki Yoshimoto, Takeo Okuno, Mitsuharu Inoue, and others.

In 1960, Takei supported the Anpo protests against the U.S.-Japan Security Treaty. Along with Yoshimoto, philosopher Tsurumi Shunsuke, poet Tanigawa Gan and others, Takei released a joint statement following the protests titled "For Now, Let Us Say This" (Sashiatatte, kore dake wa), criticizing what the signatories viewed as the overly passive stance taken by the Communist Party with regard to the protests. Then in 1961, Takei, Hanada, Ichirō Hariu, Kōbō Abe, and several other writers and critics released statements harshly criticizing the cultural policies of the party. These criticisms led to Takei's final expulsion from the party later that same year. Nevertheless, Takei remained an avid Marxist, and continued to vocally support socialist rule in the Soviet Union, North Korea, and Cuba.

In 1970, Takei quit the New Japanese Literature Society after a series of contentious debates over politics, establishing his own "Activist Group Thought Movement" (Katsudōka Shūdan Shisō Undō) and its affiliated journal Social Criticism (社会評論, Shakai hyōron).

Takei died in Kawasaki on September 2, 2010, due to ureteral cancer, at the age of 83.
