= Nikamoto =

Nikamoto (二家本) is a Japanese surname. Notable people with the surname include:

- Ryosuke Nikamoto (born 1986), Japanese bassist
- Tatsumi Nikamoto (born 1953), Japanese actor

== See also ==
- Nakamoto
