= New Japanese Literature Association =

Japanese literary society

- 新日本文学会
- Pronunciation: Shin Nihon Bungakkai
- Formation: 1945
- Dissolved: 2005
- Headquarters: New Japanese Literature Hall (新日本文学会館)
- Fields: Japanese literature, literary criticism
- Key people: Yuriko Miyamoto; Shigeharu Nakano; Korehito Kurahara; Teruo Takei
- Affiliations: Japanese Communist Party (1945–1964)

The New Japanese Literature Association (新日本文学会, Shin Nihon Bungakkai) was a professional association for Japanese writers, poets, and literary critics that existed from 1945 to 2005. For many years, the association was under the influence of the Japan Communist Party, before breaking away in the 1960s. In the early postwar era, it counted large numbers of the most prominent Japanese writers and critics as members.

== Formation ==
The New Japanese Literature Association was established in December 1945 by a group of Japanese writers and critics who hoped to revive the prewar "Proletarian literature" movement after years of state suppression during World War II. Led by the prominent proletarian writers Korehito Kurahara, Yuriko Miyamoto, and Shigeharu Nakano, the new association's 173 founding members also included Ujaku Akita, Kan Eguchi, Seikichi Fujimori, Tsurujirō Kubokawa, Sunao Tokunaga, and Shigeji Tsuboi. Most of these charter members had been members in the prewar Japan Proletarian Writers Federation (Nihon Puroretaria Sakka Dōmei), which had been coerced into disbanding in the face of government pressure in 1934.

In March 1946, the Association launched its own literary journal New Japanese Literature (Shin Nihon Bungaku). The first issue of the journal published Yuriko Miyamoto's essay "Utagoe yo, okore!" ("Singing voices, arise!"), which called for a new "democratic literature" to replace the staid, propagandistic Japanese literature of the wartime. This new literature would be "democratic" because it would be written "for the people" rather than "for the state." Miyamoto's appeal proved popular, and several other writers joined the organization over the next few years, including Kōbō Abe, Kiyoteru Hanada, Ichirō Hariu, Shūgo Honda, and Hiroshi Noma.

In the immediate aftermath of the war, almost all of these writers and critics had joined or rejoined the Japan Communist Party (JCP), which they viewed as the only group in Japanese society to have resisted wartime militarism. This meant that in its early years, the New Japanese Literature Association and its journal were heavily under the sway of the policies and commandments of the Communist Party.

== Fostering "postwar literature" ==
The Association and its members played an active role in mentoring and promoting the works of the so-called "first," "second" and "third" generations of postwar Japanese writers who forged a new type of Japanese literature now remembered under the name "postwar literature" (sengo bungaku). Over the course of the 1940s and 1950s, members of the organization engaged in a series of so-called "politics and literature debates" (seiji to bungaku ronsō) about the appropriate role of politics in literature, that gradually created a space for avant-garde literature that did not slavishly follow the "cultural policy" of the Communist Party.

== Final break with the Communist Party ==
Many members of the Association participated in the massive 1960 Anpo protests against the U.S.-Japan Security Treaty and were disappointed with what they perceived to be the Communist Party's overly passive stance. In 1961, group of 21 prominent writers who were all members of both the New Japanese Literature Association as well as the Communist Party, including Kōbō Abe, Hiroshi Noma, Teruo Takei, Kiyoteru Hanada, and Ichirō Hariu, among others, issued blistering criticisms of the party for its passive role in the Anpo protests and its attempts to "subordinate literature to politics." Unswayed, the Communist Party reaffirmed its existing "cultural policy" and expelled most of the writers involved in issuing the statements, if they had not resigned already. This outraged the Association's membership, and at the Association's 10th Congress in December 1961, Shigeharu Nakano read a statement harshly criticizing the cultural policy of the JCP and calling on authors to pursue "literary originality, while Hiroshi Noma read a statement that called for "establishing a new relationship between politics and literature."

The final break came in the lead up to the Association's 11th Congress in 1964, when it became clear that Association chairman Teruo Takei would read a statement strongly supporting the Nuclear Test Ban Treaty, which the JCP vigorously opposed. When the Association membership overwhelmingly supported Takei's stance, the party expelled almost all Association members who were still JCP members. Thereafter, the Association maintained a stance harshly critical of the JCP, although a small group of dissenters still loyal to the party splintered off to found a competing "Japanese Democratic Literature Alliance" (Nihon minshu shugi bungaku dōmei) in 1965.

== Decline and dissolution ==
After the break with the Communist Party, the New Japanese Literature Association went into a long, gradual decline. An early blow was the departure of the charismatic Teruo Takei in 1970. Membership dwindled as the surviving members aged and younger authors declined to join. In its final years, the journal New Japanese Literature had to shift from a monthly publication schedule to bimonthly, for lack of support. Finally, the journal was discontinued in 2004, and the Association itself voluntarily disbanded the following year.
