= Hiroshi Noma =

Japanese writer (1915–1991)

- 野間 宏
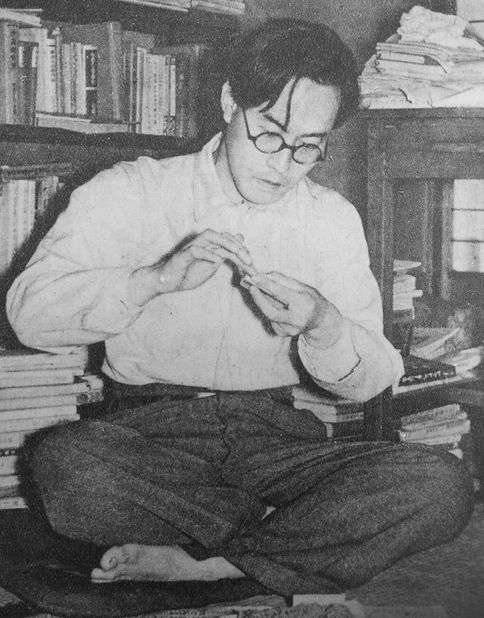
- Hiroshi Noma in 1948
- Born: February 23, 1915; Kōbe, Japan
- Died: January 2, 1991 (aged 75); Tokyo, Japan
- Education: Kyoto University
- Occupation: Writer

Hiroshi Noma (野間宏, Noma Hiroshi; February 23, 1915 – January 2, 1991) was a Japanese poet, novelist and essayist. According to literary scholar Doug Slaymaker, Noma is widely credited with having discovered or invented the style of writing called by the term "postwar literature" (sengo bungaku) in Japan.

== Early life and wartime service ==
Hiroshi Noma was born in Kōbe on February 23, 1915. His father worked as an electrician as well as a lay Buddhist priest. Among his early literary influences were the poet Takeuchi Katsutarō and French Symbolism. He entered Kyoto University in 1935, where he graduated in French literature in 1938. While attending university, he became active in Marxist student and labour movements, and later turned his attention also to the situation of the Burakumin. He was drafted into the Pacific War, stationed in the Philippines and northern China, and later spent time on charges of subversive thought in a military prison in Ōsaka.

== Literary career ==
In the immediate postwar period, Noma became a member of the Japanese Communist Party (JCP), which had achieved legal status under the U.S.-led occupation of Japan, and sought to produce literature that would support the cause of socialist revolution. He first received attention for his novel Dark Pictures (Kurai e, 1946), which was immediately hailed as a powerful work by an important new literary voice. Dark Pictures not only won praise from established literary critics, such as Ken Hirano, but also won the endorsement of the Communist Party thanks to its open embrace of Marxist ideology.

Noma followed up Dark Pictures with other well-received works, including the short stories A Red Moon in Her Face (Kao no naka no akai tsuki, 1947) and Feeling of Disintegration (Hōkai kankaku, 1948), and the novel Zone of Emptiness (Shinkū chitai, 1952). A Red Moon in Her Face argued that "the war and defeat had made it impossible to form satisfying relationships to any other human being" (Van C. Gessel), while Zone of Emptiness was Noma's attempt to "provide the reader with a true picture of what my country was like when it was under the yoke of this dominating force [of militarism]" (Noma). Thanks to the prominence of these works, Noma has been canonized as one of the "first generation" of postwar writers in Japan, alongside the likes of Rinzō Shiina, Yutaka Haniya, Haruo Umezaki, and Taijun Takeda. Noma's focus on the human body in these works led him to be categorized as a leading exponent of the "flesh school" (Nikutai-ha) of postwar writers.

Over the course of the 1950s, and especially after the Communist Party's passive stance during the 1960 Anpo protests against the U.S.-Japan Security Treaty, many writers and critics became disillusioned with the JCP. However, Noma remained committed to Marxist ideology at that time, and his 1961 novel Waga tō wa soko ni tatsu (lit. "My tower stands there") was criticized by literary critics such as Takeo Okuno, Kōichi Isoda, and Takaaki Yoshimoto for being too openly political. However that summer, Noma joined a group of writers and critics in issuing a blistering criticism of the Communist Party's cultural policies, and in December 1961, at the 10th Congress of the New Japanese Literature Association (Shin Nihon Bungakkai), Noma read aloud another statement criticizing the JCP's policies and calling for "a new relationship between politics and literature." These criticisms proved unacceptable to the party, and ultimately contributed to Noma's expulsion from the JCP in 1964.

In 1971, Noma completed what is considered his masterpiece, Seinen no wa (lit. "Circle of youth"), which he had begun writing in 1948 and had taken him 24 years to complete. This lengthy 5-volume work, intended to embody Noma's "Total Novel Theory" (zentai shosetsu riron), was awarded the Tanizaki Prize for 1971 as well as the Lotus Prize for Literature the following year. Among other later works, Shinran (1973) expounded Noma's thoughts on religion, and Sayama saiban (1976) considered discrimination against Burakumin as exemplified in the Sayama incident of 1963.

Noma died of cancer in Tokyo in 1991.

== Selected works ==
- 1946: Dark Pictures (Kurai e)
- 1947: A Red Moon in Her Face (Kao no naka no akai tsuki)
- 1948: Feeling of Disintegration (Hōkai kankaku)
- 1952: Zone of Emptiness (Shinkū chitai)
- 1961: Waga tō wa soko ni tatsu
- 1971: Seinen no wa
- 1973: Shinran
- 1976: Sayama saiban

== Translations (selected) ==
- Noma, Hiroshi (1956). Zone of Emptiness. Translated by Frechtman, Bernard (from the French); de Boissel, Henriette (from the Japanese into French). Cleveland and New York: The World Publishing Company.
- Noma, Hiroshi (1972). "A Red Moon in Her Face". In Decker, Clarence Raymond; Angoff, Charles (eds.). Modern stories from many lands. Translated by Tsuruta, Kinya. New York: Manyland Books. ISBN 978-0-87141-040-5.
- Noma, Hiroshi (2000). Dark Pictures and Other Stories (Dark Pictures, Feeling of Disintegration, Red Moon in Her Face). Michigan Monograph Series in Japanese Studies. Translated by Raeside, James. Ann Arbor, Michigan: Center for Japanese Studies, University of Michigan Press. ISBN 0-939512-03-3.

== Adaptations ==
Zone of Emptiness was adapted into a film in 1952, directed by Satsuo Yamamoto.

== See also ==
- Japanese literature
- The First Generation of Postwar Writers
