= The First Generation of Postwar Writers =

Group of modern Japanese writers

The First Generation of Postwar Writers is a classification in Modern Japanese literature used to group writers who appeared on the postwar literary scene between 1946 and 1947.

== List of First Generation writers ==
- Haniya Yutaka (埴谷雄高)
- Nakamura Shin'ichirō (中村真一郎)
- Noma Hiroshi (野間宏)
- Shiina Rinzō (椎名麟三)
- Takeda Taijun (武田泰淳)
- Umezaki Haruo (梅崎春生)

== Background of the Post-War Literature in Japan ==
During the beginning of the post-war period in Japan, the revolution of post-war literature in Japan became modern democratic as "Democracy", "Freedom", "class", and "individual". However, the influence of the emperor system made the revolution of post-war literature of Japan become contra-democratic. Therefore, the post-war literature in Japan had transferred to the management under the imperial institution of Japan.

== Characteristics and Significance of the Post-War Literature ==
During the period post-war in Japan, trauma was one of the representations as characteristics in literature and movie. During the literature in post-war Japan, the narration usually would be considered as the view of the "victim" in the war between Japan and other countries. Meanwhile, the reason for creating the characteristics of trauma and victim was the expectation to separate the past and present in Japanese military history.

Besides the characteristics of trauma and victim. The influence of the post-war literature in Japan can be demonstrated as "Body", "Individual", and "National Identity".

The body and the individual identity in post-war Japanese literature could be generally described as "Nikutai"(肉体) and "Kokutai"(国体). The representation of "Nikutai" could be demonstrated as the physical body and the non-physical (spiritual) body in the literature of Japan. The representation of "Kokutai" could be represented as a social-related text about the national identity as the country of Japan. The influence of the body on the post-war literature by the writers demonstrated the reflection of the individual and the national identity, which led the content of the post-war literature from the individual prospect to the consideration of the whole nation in Japan.

== See also ==
- Japanese literature
- The Second Generation of Postwar Writers
- The Third Generation of Postwar Writers
