= Sakurajima (novella) =

1946 Japanese novella

- Author: Haruo Umezaki
- Original title: 桜島
- Translator: D.E. Mills
- Language: Japanese
- Publisher: Sunao (magazine)
- Publication date: 1946
- Publication place: Japan
- English publication date: 1966
- Media type: Print

Sakurajima (桜島) is a war novella by Japanese writer Haruo Umezaki. It was first published in 1946 and is nowadays regarded as Umezaki's best-known work.

== Plot ==
During the last weeks of the Pacific War, naval NCO and crypto specialist Murakami, stationed in Bonotsu, receives a marching order to Sakurajima. On his way, in a village near Makurazaki, he spends the night with a young disfigured prostitute who has only one ear. Convinced that Murakami will die in combat, she asks him how he will die, a question that stays with him.

Murakami arrives in Sakurajima, a military post awaiting the imminent invasion of American troops and the launch base of kamikaze flights. Personally in doubt that Japan can still win the war, Murakami is confronted with disillusioned soldiers, roistering young kamikaze pilots, and rigid commanding officer Kira, who forbids any defeatist thoughts. He has repeated conversations with an elderly guard, who tells him of a near by farm where a disabled old man is being picked on by his relatives. During a carousing night, Murakami hears of the bombing of Hiroshima and Russia's invasion of the Japanese mainland. He gets into an argument with the drunken Kira, who ridicules Murakami's wish for a "beautiful death".

The next day, a low-flying aircraft attacks the island, misses Murakami but kills the elderly guard. After this incident, no further enemy planes are spotted. Murakami joins a group of men who have been ordered to burn those codebooks which are no longer needed. Upon his return to the shelter, he learns that the Emperor has declared Japan's defeat. Kira draws his sword as if to commit suicide, but eventually retracts.

== Publication history ==
Sakurajima was first published in September 1946 in the magazine Sunao (素直), which was edited by poet and social activist Shin'ichi Eguchi. The story was based on Umezaki's own experiences, who, like the main character Murakami, was stationed in Kyushu as a crypto specialist, although Umezaki later emphasised that the first person narrator was as much an invention and fictional as the other characters. The novella established Umezaki as a representative of Japanese postwar literature along writers like Hiroshi Noma and Rinzō Shiina.

== Translation ==
Sakurajima was translated into English by D.E. Mills and appeared in the 1966 anthology The Shadow of Sunrise: Selected Stories of Japan and the War and its slightly altered (Note: The 1981 reprint omitted Masuji Ibuse's story The Far-worshipping Commander.) 1981 reprint The Catch and Other War Stories.

== Bibliography ==
- Umezaki, Haruo (1951). 桜島 (Sakurajima). Tokyo: 新潮社 (Shinchōsha).
- Saeki, Shoichi, ed. (1966). The Shadow of Sunrise: Selected Stories of Japan and the War. Tokyo: Kodansha International.
- Saeki, Shoichi, ed. (1981). The Catch and Other War Stories. Tokyo: Kodansha International.
