= Kiyoteru Hanada =

- 花田 清輝
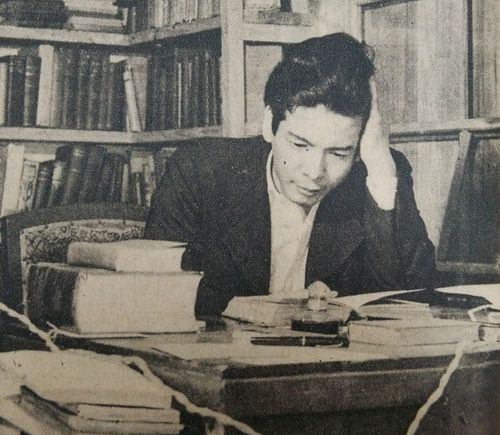
- Kiyoteru Hanada
- Born: 29 March 1909; Fukuoka, Empire of Japan
- Died: 23 September 1974 (aged 65); Shinanomachi, Shinjuku, Tokyo, Japan
- Occupation: Writer
- Known for: Essays, literary criticism
- Notable work: Fukkoku no seishin ("The Renaissance Spirit")
- Relatives: Jukki Hanada (Grandson)

Kiyoteru Hanada (花田 清輝, Hanada Kiyoteru; March 29, 1909 – September 23, 1974) was a prominent Japanese literary critic and essayist. Hanada is widely acclaimed as one of the most influential advocates and theorists of the postwar avant-garde art movement. Jukki Hanada is his grandson.

== Biography ==
Hanada was born in the Higashi Kōen district of Fukuoka, Japan on March 29, 1909, and grew up as an only child. The Japanese warlord Mōri Terumoto was a direct ancestor, and it had long been the standard practice in his family to include the character "teru" (輝) in male names. Hanada studied at Kyoto Imperial University from 1929 to 1931. While at university, Hanada became totally devoted to the philosophy of home-grown Japanese fascist Nakano Seigō. Hanada moved to Tokyo and became a journalist for the Gunji Kōgyō Shimbun, a pro-government military-industrial economic newspaper, and received financial backing from his idol Nakano. However, during World War II, Hanada published numerous essays that were highly critical of the government and the growth of Japanese militarism in the literary magazine Bunka Soshiki, which he founded in 1939. His aim was to criticize Japanese nativist logic from within, taking advantage of his position within rightist circles to make use of the more liberal discursive space allotted to rightists within the wartime militarist state.

After World War II, Hanada sought to atone for his past as a supporter of fascism by joining the Japan Communist Party (JCP). He became a devout Marxist and strongly believed that art should serve politics, and in particular, the cause of socialist revolution. In the early postwar years he contributed works to the literary magazine Kindai Bungei, and published a series of influential books of social and literary criticism, such as Fukkoku no seishin ("The Renaissance Spirit"), a collection of essays on various writers, including Dante and Cervantes, in 1946, and Futatsu no sekai ("Two Worlds"), containing also the seminal essay 'Sabaku ni tsuite' ('On Desert') which became a source of influence for writer Kōbō Abe. As a leading member of the New Japanese Literature Association (Shin Nihon Bungakukai), he helped promote the works of the "first generation" of postwar writers.

Hanada was also the founder of the Yoru no Kai ("The Night Society"), which included the likes of artist Tarō Okamoto, Kōbō Abe, and critic Ichirō Hariu. Hanada was an executive adviser to publisher Shinzenbisha, which published Abe's first novel, For the Signpost at the End of the Road, on his recommendation. Contemporaries regarded Abe as a faithful pupil of Hanada's way of thinking, and Abe was inspired by a number of Hanada's essays in his work.

Over the course of the 1950s, Hanada became disillusioned by the endless infighting within the Communist Party, and began to gradually distance himself from the party, although he remained a member. In 1954, Communist loyalists managed to have Hanada fired as editor-in-chief of the JCP-linked literary journal New Japan Literature (Shin Nihon Bungaku) when he rejected a manuscript submitted by senior party official Kenji Miyamoto. In 1960 Hanada supported the massive Anpo protests against the U.S.-Japan Security Treaty, but was disappointed by the passive role taken by the JCP. In 1961, Hanada joined a number of other writers and critics in issuing statements condemning the cultural policies of the Communist Party and what they saw as the party's inadequate participation in the Anpo protests. His participation in this criticism directly led to his expulsion from the party that same year.

Hanada was very interested in the growth of Japanese radio drama and television, and played a role in the development of integrated audio-visual art. Hanada also developed a personal philosophy which he called "Mineralism" (Kōbutsushugi), which combined materialism with a sense of values.

Hanada died of a cerebral hemorrhage on September 23, 1974. His grave is located in Matsudo city, Chiba prefecture.
