= Nakijin, Okinawa =

Nakijin 今帰仁村 Nachizin
- Village
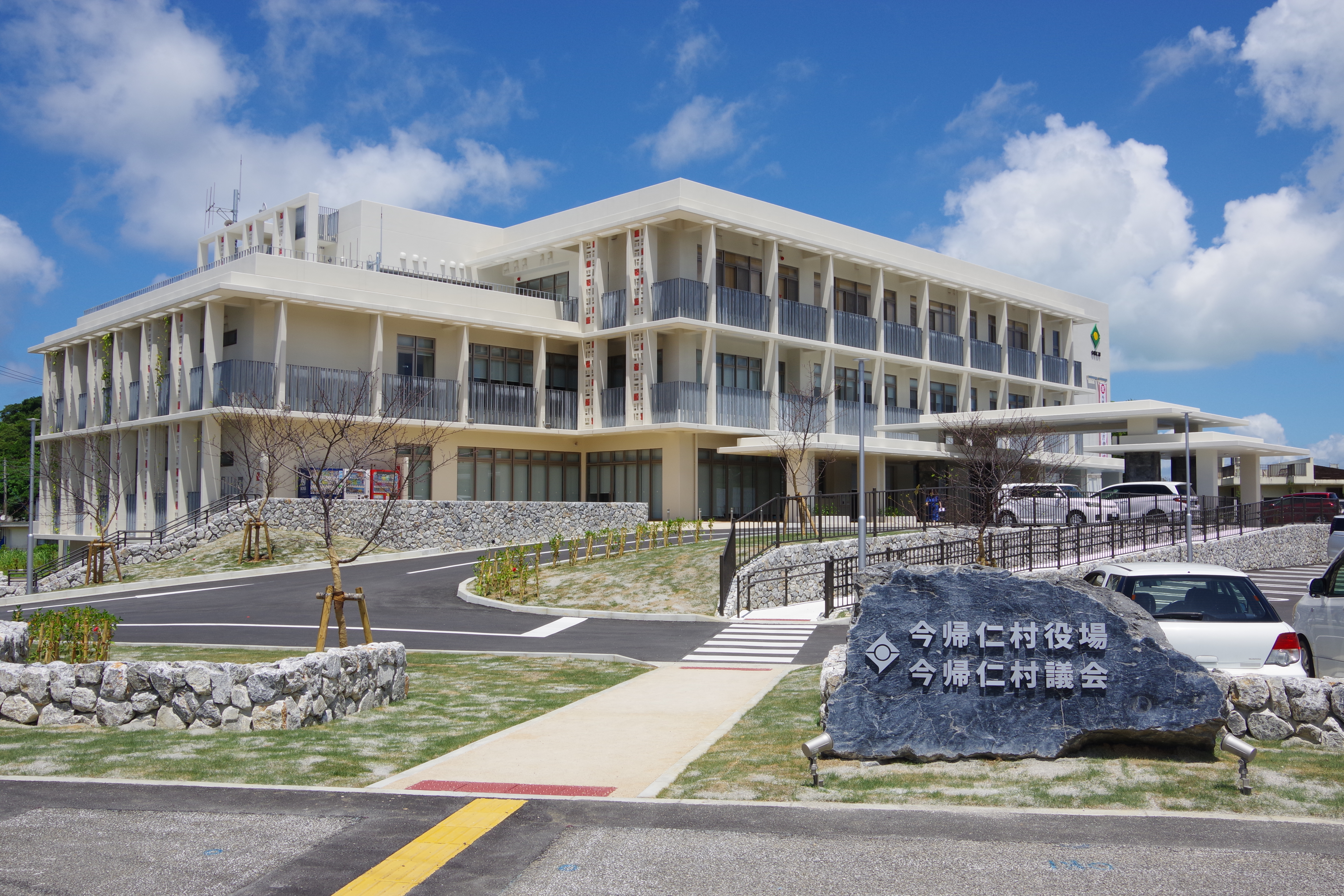
- Nakijin Village Office

- Flag Seal

- Location of Nakijin in Okinawa Prefecture

- Location in Japan
- Coordinates: 26°40′57″N 127°58′22″E
- Country: Japan
- Region: Kyushu (Okinawa)
- Prefecture: Okinawa Prefecture
- District: Kunigami

Government
  - Mayor: Hiroya Hisada

Area
  - Total: 39.87 km^{2} (15.39 sq mi)

Population (August 1, 2024)
  - Total: 8,819
  - Density: 221.2/km^{2} (572.9/sq mi)
- Time zone: UTC+09:00 (JST)
- Website: www.nakijin.jp

Nakijin (今帰仁村, Nakijin-son; Kunigami: Nachizin, Okinawan: Nachijin, Northern Ryukyuan: いまきじり Imakijiri) is a village located in Kunigami District, Okinawa Prefecture, Japan.

As of 2003, the village has an estimated population of 9,529 and a population density of 239.00 persons per km^{2}. The total area is 39.87 km^{2}.

== Geography ==
Nakijin Village occupies the northern half of Motobu Peninsula on Okinawa Island. It includes the island of Kouri that was linked to the island of Yagaji (belonging to Nago City) by a bridge in 2005 (Kouri-Ōhashi Bridge). Yagaji was linked to Nakijin Village by the Urumi-Ōhashi Bridge in 2010. The village is crossed by the Ōi-gawa River that runs northward to the East China Sea.

=== Administrative divisions ===
The village includes nineteen wards.

- Amesoko (天底)
- Gogayama (呉我山)
- Heshiki (平敷)
- Imadomari (今泊), merger of Nakijin (今帰仁) and Oyadomari (親泊)
- Jana (謝名)
- Kamiunten (上運天)
- Kaneshi (兼次)
- Koechi (越地)
- Kouri (古宇利)
- Nakaoji (仲尾次)
- Nakasone (仲宗根)
- Sakiyama (崎山)
- Serikyaku (勢理客)
- Shoshi (諸志), merger of Shokita (諸喜田) and Shijima (志慶間)
- Tamashiro (玉城)
- Tokijin (渡喜仁)
- Unten (運天)
- Wakugawa (湧川)
- Yonamine (与那嶺)

=== Neighbouring municipalities ===
- Motobu
- Nago

== Education ==
The village operates its public elementary and junior high schools.

- Nakijin Junior High School (今帰仁中学校)
- Amesoko Elementary School (天底小学校)
- Kaneshi Elementary School (兼次小学校)
- Nakijin Elementary School (今帰仁小学校)

Okinawa Prefectural Board of Education operates Hokuzan High School.

== Notable people ==
- Shun Medoruma, novelist
- Seiji Shimota, novelist

== Cultural and natural assets ==
Nakijin Village hosts twenty-three designated or registered cultural properties and monuments, at the national, prefectural or municipal level.

- Name (Japanese) (Type of registration)

=== Cultural Properties ===
- Aoriyae Aji's magatama / Aoriyae Noro's magatama (あおりやえ按司曲玉/阿応理屋恵ノロの曲玉) (Prefectural)
- Aragusuku Tokujo and Aragusuku Tokukō's warrants of appointment and related documents (新城徳助・徳幸宛辞令書及び関係資料) (Municipal)
- Ichigusuku Tomb (イチグスク(池城)墓) (Municipal)

Inscription with the history of the Wardens of Nakijin Castle, Sanhoku (:ja:山北今帰仁城監守来歴碑記) (Prefectural)

- Jicchaku Noro's ritual implements (勢理客ノロの祭祀道具一式) (Municipal)
- Kouri tūmiya lookout (古宇利トゥーミヤ(遠見台)) (Municipal)
- Maps of Heshiki Village in Nakijin Magiri (今帰仁間切平敷村略図及び平敷村字図) (Municipal)
- Maps of the villages in Nakijin Magiri, Kunigami District (国頭郡今帰仁間切各村全図及び字図) (Municipal)
- Momojana-baka Tomb (百按司墓) (Municipal)
- Nakagusuku Noro's ritual implements (中城ノロの祭祀道具一式) (Municipal)
- Nakamura Gensei's warrant of appointment and related documents (仲村源正宛辞令書及び関係資料) (Municipal)
- Nakijin Castle Site and Shiina Castle Site (今帰仁城跡附シイナ城跡) (Prefectural)
- Nakijin Noro's ritual implements (今帰仁ノロの祭祀道具一式) (Municipal)
- Shokita Fukuan's warrant of appointment and related documents (諸喜田福安宛辞令書及び関係資料) (Municipal)
- Ūnishi Tomb (大北墓) (Municipal)

=== Folk Cultural Properties ===
- Kami-asagi Sacred Site of Sakiyama (崎山の神ハザギ) (Municipal)
- Letters Incinerator of Shoshi (諸志の焚字炉) (Municipal)

=== Historic Sites ===
- Nakabaru Maaui Hippodrome (今帰仁村仲原馬場) (Prefectural)
- Nakijin Castle Site and Shiina Castle Site (今帰仁城跡附シイナ城跡) (National)

=== Places of scenic beauty ===
- Amamiku-nu-mui (アマミクヌムイ) (National)
- Nakijin Castle Site and Shiina Castle Site (今帰仁城跡附シイナ城跡) (Prefectural)

=== Natural Monuments ===
- Amesoko Thorea gaudichaudii algae (天底のシマチスジノリ) (Prefectural)
- Dendrolobium umbellatum community in Nakasone Kakihatabaru (Municipal)
- Shoshi Utaki plant community (諸志御嶽の植物群落) (National)
- Tropical almond tree Terminalia catappa of Imadomari (今泊のコバテイシ) (Prefectural)

== See also ==
- Nakijin Castle
