= Third Generation of Postwar Writers =

Modern Japanese literature classification

The Third Generation of Postwar Writers (第三の新人, daisan no shinjin) is a classification in modern Japanese literature used to group writers who appeared in the postwar literary scene between 1953 and 1955. The term was coined by Yamamoto Kenkichi. They are well known for writing and reviving the prewar genre known as I-novels.

Shūsaku Endō, a member of the Third Generation once said, "In those days, although we had received the Akutagawa Prize one after another, hardly did anyone expect that we would become great writers. We were regarded as if we would soon be forgotten by the literary world. Precisely, almost all people did not start to know Akutagawa Prize until Ishihara Shintaro had won the prize and surfed away mass media and provoked public opinion into asunder, as the first manifesto from one of the Postwar Generation."

However, despite this, this generation has made a major mark on Japanese literature. The works of Endō in particularly have been translated into many languages and are widely read in the United States, France, and Germany.

At that same time, women writers such as Aya Kōda (幸田文), Minako Oba, and Sawako Ariyoshi also made their debuts.

After this generation, predominant and various writers like Shintaro Ishihara, Morio Kita, and Kenzaburō Ōe appeared.

== List of the third generation of postwar writers ==
- Shūsaku Endō (遠藤周作)
- Shōtarō Yasuoka (安岡章太郎)
- Junnosuke Yoshiyuki (吉行淳之介)
- Junzo Shono (庄野潤三)
- Shumon Miura (三浦朱門)
- Ayako Sono (曽野綾子)
- Hiroyuki Agawa (阿川弘之)
- Kojima Nobuo (小島信夫)
- Shimao Toshio (島尾 敏雄)
- Setouchi Jakuchō (瀬戸内 寂聴)

== See also ==
- Japanese literature
- The First Generation of Postwar Writers
- The Second Generation of Postwar Writers
