= Zone of Emptiness =

War novel by Japanese writer Hiroshi Noma

- Author: Hiroshi Noma
- Original title: Shinkū chitai
- Translator: Bernard Frechtman
- Language: Japanese
- Genre: War novel
- Publisher: Kawade Shobō Shinsha (Japan); The World Publishing Company (USA)
- Publication date: 1952
- Publication place: Japan
- English publication date: 1956
- Media type: Print

Zone of Emptiness (真空地帯, Shinkū chitai) is a war novel by Japanese writer Hiroshi Noma, first published in 1952.

== Plot ==
The action takes place in Japan in late 1944, in a Japanese Army infantry barracks. The protagonists are two soldiers, Kitani and Soda. Kitani has spent two years in a military penitentiary for a crime he has not committed, the theft of an officer's wallet. He is actually the victim of the struggle between two cliques in the regiment he belonged to. Soda is an honest and sensitive young man who would like to be Kitani's friend and strives to reconstruct his story. The novel is told in the third person, but with two strong narrative foci on the two protagonists.

Noma's novel is a denunciation of the corruption of the Japanese army during World War II, and it aims at providing "the readers with a true picture of what [Noma's] country was like when it was under the yoke of [militarism]" (from the author's preface). However, the depiction of the humiliating conditions in which Japanese soldiers were kept during the Second World War is not Noma's only purpose in writing Zone of Emptiness, as he "tried to describe not only the Japanese army but also what is universal in the Japanese soul". A painstaking psychological analysis of the characters is in fact another important component of the novel, where the gradual unveiling of Soda's and Kitani's past allows readers to understand the motivations of their behaviour and actions.

== Translation ==
Zone of Emptiness was translated into French by Henriette de Boissel at the University of Tokyo and published by Editions Le Sycomore as Zone de vide, and subsequently translated into English by Bernard Frechtman and published in the United States in 1956 by The World Publishing Company.

== Adaptation ==
Zone of Emptiness was adapted into a film in 1952, directed by Satsuo Yamamoto.
