= Korehiro Kurahara =

Japanese educator and politician

- 蔵原惟郭
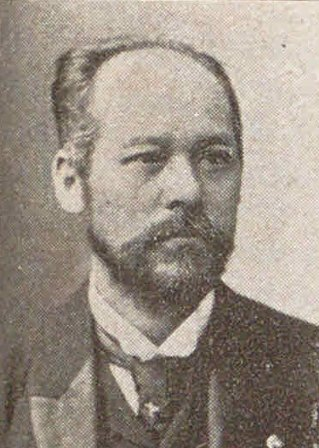
- Korehiro Kurahara
- Born: August 11, 1861; Higo province, Japan
- Died: January 11, 1949 (aged 87); Nerima, Tokyo
- Education: Kumamoto Yogakko, Doshisha University
- Occupations: Educator, politician
- Political party: Rikken Seiyūkai, Rikken Kokumintō, Rikken Dōshikai

Korehiro Kurahara (蔵原 惟郭; August 11, 1861 – January 8, 1949) was a Japanese educator and politician. He was the father of Korehito Kurahara.

== Early life and education ==
Kurahara was born on August 11, 1861, in Higo province, which is now Aso, Kumamoto. He attended Kumamoto Yogakko, where he was a member of the Christian organization called the Kumamoto Band. He then studied at Doshisha University. He studied abroad at the Andover Theological Seminary and the Auburn Theological Seminary from 1884 to 1890.

== Career ==
Kurahara returned to Japan in 1891 and became the principal of two schools in Kumamoto prefecture. At the same time he also married Shiu Kitasato, the younger sister of Kitasato Shibasaburo. He then moved to Gifu prefecture and became the principal of a middle school there in 1896. However, he left the school the year after in 1897 and moved to Tokyo, where he worked at an educational organization promoting libraries. In 1900 he was one of the founding members of the Rikken Seiyūkai. He later also became a member of the Rikken Kokumintō and the Rikken Dōshikai.

In 1908 Kurahara was elected to the House of Representatives. While in office he spoke about against the Japanese village in the Japan-British Exhibition in 1910. He took the floor on January 25, 1911, and said that, based on his experience living overseas that it diminished Japan's international image. He was also known for opposing the creation of a national textbook and advocating for universal suffrage. He remained in office until 1915.

Kurahara became active in the labor movement after leaving office, founding the Rikken Rōdō Gikai (立憲労働義会) in 1919.

Kurahara died in Nerima, Tokyo on January 8, 1949. His original family home in Kumamoto is preserved by the government as a historic home.
