= Shumon Miura =

Japanese novelist (1926–2017)

- 三浦朱門
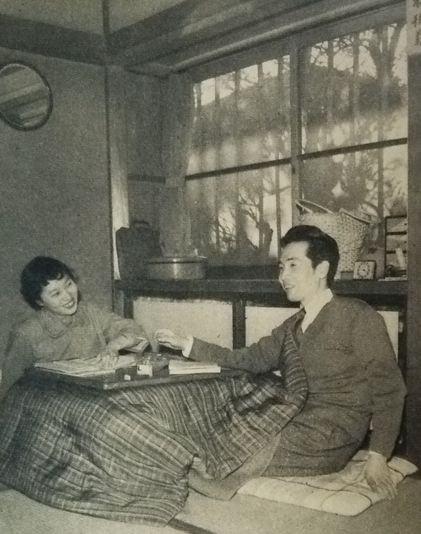
- Miura with Ayako Sono, his wife in 1955

Head of the Japan Art Academy
- In office 2004–2014
- Preceded by: Tadashi Inumaru
- Succeeded by: Kuroi Senji

Commissioner for Cultural Affairs
- In office 1 April 1985 – 1 September 1986
- Preceded by: Isao Suzuki
- Succeeded by: Hitoshi Ōsaki

Personal details
- Born: 12 January 1926 Tokyo City, Tokyo Prefecture, Empire of Japan
- Died: 3 February 2017 (aged 91) Tokyo, Japan
- Spouse: Ayako Sono (m. 1953–2017)
- Education: University of Tokyo

Shumon Miura (三浦 朱門, Miura Shumon; 12 January 1926 – 3 February 2017) was a Japanese novelist.

He attended the University of Tokyo, and upon graduation joined the staff of the literary magazine Shin-Shicho (新思潮: "New Thought") in 1950. The next year, Miura published his first book. He then married fellow Third Generation writer Ayako Sono in 1953, with whom he wrote many books about Catholicism and religion. Miura began teaching at Nihon University in 1967, the same year he was awarded the Shinchosha Prize. From 1985 to 1986, he was commissioner of the Cultural Affairs Agency. In 1999, the Japanese government designated Miura a Person of Cultural Merit. In 2004, Miura was appointed to lead the Japan Art Academy. He stepped down in 2014, and died at a hospital in Tokyo due to pneumonia on 3 February 2017, aged 91.
