= Second Generation of Postwar Writers =

The Second Generation of Postwar Writers (第二次戦後派作家, Dainiji Sengo-ha Sakka) is a classification in modern Japanese literature used for writers who appeared on the postwar literary scene between 1948 and 1949.

Exceptional in this generation of postwar writers are Mishima Yukio and Abe Kōbō, both of whom have received acclaim in Japan and abroad. At times, their reputation abroad has surpassed that of their reputation in Japan.

== List of Second Generation writers ==
- Mishima Yukio (三島由紀夫)
- Abe Kōbō (安部公房)
- Ōoka Shōhei (大岡昇平)
- Shimao Toshio (島尾敏雄)
- Hotta Yoshie (堀田善衛)
- Inoue Mitsuharu (井上光晴)

== See also ==
- Japanese literature
- The First Generation of Postwar Writers
- The Third Generation of Postwar Writers
