= Shizuo Fujieda =

Japanese writer

Shizuo Fujieda (藤枝 静男, Fujieda Shizuo; December 20, 1907 - April 16, 1993) was a Japanese writer.

Shizuo Fujieda's first profession was of an ophthalmologist. For many years before becoming a full-time author he wrote only when he was free from his work as an ophthalmologist. Fujieda's literary career began rather late. He was already 39 when his first short story was published in a literary magazine. Fujieda knew Shūgo Honda and Ken Hirano, two literary critics, from his school days. It was that duo who gave him his pen name. Naoya Shiga, one of the best known writers of the time, was an inspiration to Fujieda. When Fujieda was 20 he had met the famous writer.

After several years of stagnation as a writer, Fujieda finally established himself as a writer of the autobiographical "I-novel." He rose steadily to prominence in this genre. The effort to explore the self is evident in Fujieda's works. This deep exploratory prose is the hallmark of Fujieda's. There are also significant portions in his stories that bear a strong resemblance to reality, to his life. In the story Kuki atama (Head of Air), the protagonist is, like Fujieda once was, an ophthalmologist. His stories also deal with subjects such as relations between father and son and between siblings but in unusual settings. In his story Ikka danran (Happy Family Circle), the protagonist falls through into a grave and is met by his father and five siblings.

== Major prizes ==
- 1976 Tanizaki Prize - Denshin ugaku (田紳有楽)
- 1979 Noma Prize - Kanashii dake (悲しいだけ)

== Selected works ==
- Inu no chi, 1957.
- Rakudai menjō, 1968.
- Gongu jōdo, 1970.
- Aru toshi no fuyu aru toshi no natsu, 1971.
- Kyōto Tsuda Sanzō, 1971.
- Gūmoku gudan, 1972.
- Aikokushatachi, 1973.
- Fujieda Shizuo sakuhin shu, 1974.
- Isho domu, 1975.
- Shōkan keidan, 1975.
- Denshin ugaku (田紳有楽), 1976.
- Fujieda Shizuo chosaku shū, 1976-1977.
- Bōkai henshi, 1978.
- Kanashii dake (悲しいだけ), 1979.
- Kyōto Tsuda Sanzō, 1979.
- Sakka no shisei, 1980.
- Kyokai, Tōkyō : Kōdansha, 1983.
