= Yōhei Sasakawa =

Chairman of The Nippon Foundation

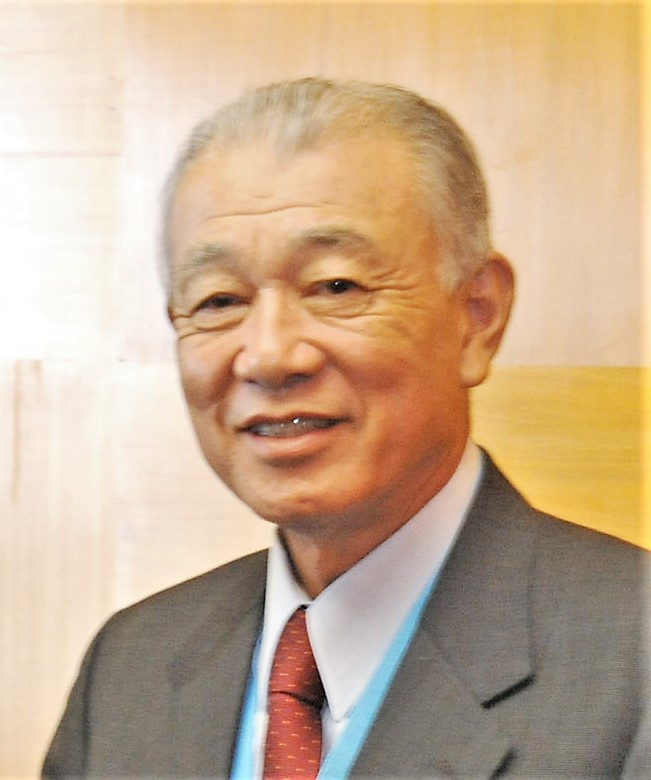

Yōhei Sasakawa (笹川 陽平, Sasakawa Yōhei; born 8 January 1939) is a Japanese businessman and diplomat.

He's the World Health Organization Goodwill Ambassador for Leprosy Elimination. He was chairman of the Nippon Foundation, Japan's largest charitable foundation, from 2005 to 2025.

His father was the controversial businessman and politician Ryōichi Sasakawa.

== Overview of activities ==
After serving as chairman of the Japan Motorboat Racing Association, and as a director of the Japan Foundation for Shipbuilding Advancement (now the Ocean Policy Research Foundation), Yohei Sasakawa was named president of the Foundation in 1989. In July 2005, he was appointed chairman, following the retirement of Ayako Sono, the previous chair. In July 2025, Takeju Ogata took over as chairman of the foundation, and Sasakawa became Honorary Chair.

His international aid activities have focused on three areas essential to life: food security, healthcare and education. His aid activities within Japan have focused on areas not addressed by government policies, including the development of the nation's nongovernmental organizations and volunteer activities, the enhancement of services for senior citizens and those with disabilities, and the donation of 20,000 care vehicles to social-welfare organizations throughout Japan. His key projects include:

- Medical examinations for 200,000 children victimized by the Chernobyl nuclear power plant accident;
- Establishment of a system through which users would pay for the support of safe navigation through the Strait of Malacca;
- Establishment of a global scholarship network of 69 universities;
- Establishment of a program to bring 2,000 Chinese doctors to Japan for training, and;
- Development of Arctic Sea lanes that are usable year-round.

His domestic work also covers a wide area, including the development of measures to combat maritime piracy, the publicizing of the operation of North Korean spy ships, the training of hospice nurses, and the building of networks to support crime victims. Sasakawa is also known for his efforts to ensure passage of Japan's Basic Ocean Law in 2007, and his central role in organizing the Tokyo Marathon.

=== Leprosy elimination ===
Yohei Sasakawa sees leprosy elimination as a personal mission inherited from his father, Ryōichi Sasakawa. In 1965, he accompanied his father to a leprosy treatment facility in South Korea, and the shock at seeing the discrimination faced by people affected by leprosy first-hand convinced him of the need for leprosy control.

Sasakawa works to advance dialog between people affected by leprosy, government leaders, the media, and other parties in many countries, with a particular focus on places where the disease is endemic. He focuses on promoting an accurate understanding of the disease: particularly the fact that it is curable and has served as the WHO Goodwill Ambassador for Leprosy Elimination since May 2001.

In the 1990s, Sasakawa worked to promote the distribution of multidrug therapy (MDT) as a means of controlling leprosy. However, realizing that people affected by leprosy, and even their families, continue to face discrimination in areas such as employment and education even after they have been cured, he has advocated that leprosy be approached not simply as a medical issue but as a social one involving human-rights concerns.

In July 2003, he visited the Office of the United Nations High Commissioner for Human Rights, seeking to bring the issue before the United Nations Human Rights Committee (now the United Nations Human Rights Council). Subsequently, in March 2004, he raised the matter at a plenary session of the Commission. As a result, in August 2004, the Sub-Commission on the Promotion and Protection of Human Rights initiated studies to formally address leprosy and its related discrimination issues as a human-rights issue, eventually unanimously approving a resolution calling on national governments, leprosy-related organizations and UN institutions to improve the current state of affairs.

Since then, Sasakawa has continued to work to resolve leprosy's social aspects by establishing the Sasakawa-India Leprosy Foundation in 2006 to assist the independence of people affected by the disease.

Sasakawa has been awarded a number of international prizes, including the Yomiuri International Cooperation Prize (2004), International Gandhi Award (2006), and the Gandhi Peace Prize (2018). Most recently, the Japanese foreign ministry appointed him as its Ambassador for the Human Rights of People Affected by Leprosy.

=== Maritime affairs ===
Sasakawa is also active in the field of maritime issues. He is advancing new initiatives to address maritime issues in Japan, including the establishment of the nation's first Basic Ocean Law. Sasakawa also established in 2004 the United Nations – Nippon Foundation Fellowship Programme to contribute to the building of a new generation of ocean leaders and professionals.

Advocating for the importance of information disclosure by public-interest groups, Sasakawa runs a daily blog (in Japanese) of his activities and thoughts. Under Sasakawa's leadership, the Nippon Foundation's disclosure efforts have won high marks amid government reforms of the public interest field. In addition to creating a website (CANPAN CSR Plus) that helps businesses to participate directly in social-welfare activities, fulfilling their corporate social responsibility (CSR), Sasakawa advocates for work toward a society based on an integration of national and local governments, nonprofit organizations, and corporate CSR efforts. The aim is a society where all members participate in creating the common good.

== Other professional positions ==
- Special Envoy of the Government of Japan for National Reconciliation in Myanmar [2013–Present]
- Goodwill Ambassador for the Welfare of the National Races in Myanmar

(Appointed by the Minister of Foreign Affairs of Japan) [2012–Present]

- Goodwill Ambassador for the Human Rights of Persons Affected by Leprosy

(Appointed by the Minister of Foreign Affairs of Japan) [2007–Present]

- World Health Organization Goodwill Ambassador for Leprosy Elimination [2001–Present]
- Trustee, Foundation Franco-Japonaise Sasakawa
- Trustee, United States-Japan Foundation
- Trustee, Scandinavia-Japan Sasakawa Foundation
- Trustee, The Great Britain Sasakawa Foundation
- Advisor, The Tokyo Foundation
- Advisor, The Sasakawa Japan-China Friendship Fund

== Publication ==
- Sasakawa, Yohei (2019). No Matter Where the Journey Takes Me. Hurst & Company. ISBN 978-1-78738-137-7.
- Sasakawa, Yohei (2019). My Struggle against Leprosy. Tokyo: Festina Lente. ISBN 978-4-9910866-0-1.
