= Nakamoto =

Nakamoto (中本, 中元, etc.) is a Japanese surname. Notable people with the surname include:

- Himeka Nakamoto (born 1996), Japanese mental health counselor, former idol and former member of Nogizaka46
- Hiroshi Nakamoto (born 1966), Japanese baseball player
- Katsuya Nakamoto (中元 勝也; born 1977), Japanese freestyle skier
- Kentaro Nakamoto (born 1982), Japanese long distance runner
- Kōji Nakamoto (仲本 工事; 1941–2022), Japanese comedian
- Kuniharu Nakamoto (born 1959), Japanese football player
- Lynn Nakamoto (born 1960), Japanese American judge
- Miriam Nakamoto (born 1976), Japanese American Muay Thai fighter
- Mitsuaki Nakamoto (born 1954), Japanese handball player in the 1984 Olympics
- Satoshi Nakamoto (fl. 2008–2011), the pseudonymous creator of the bitcoin digital currency
- Shuhei Nakamoto (born 1957), vice-president of Honda Racing
- Suzuka Nakamoto (born 1997), Japanese singer, former member of Karen Girl's and Sakura Gakuin; frontwoman of Babymetal
- Takako Nakamoto (中本 たか子; 1903–1991), Japanese novelist
- Yuta Nakamoto (born 1995), Japanese singer active in South Korea, member of boy group NCT 127

== People with the given name ==
- Tominaga Nakamoto (born 1715), Japanese philosopher
