= Ichirō Hariu =

Japanese art critic

- 針生 一郎
- Born: December 1, 1925; Sendai, Miyagi, Empire of Japan
- Died: May 26, 2010 (aged 84); Kawasaki, Kanagawa, Japan
- Education: Tohoku University; Tokyo University
- Occupation: Cultural critic
- Writing career
- Language: Japanese

Ichirō Hariu (針生 一郎, Hariu Ichirō; December 1, 1925–May 26, 2010), was a Japanese art critic and literary critic, remembered as one of the "Big Three" art critics of postwar Japan (alongside Yoshiaki Tōno and Yūsuke Nakahara).

== Early life and education ==
Ichirō Hariu was born on December 1, 1925, in the city of Sendai in Miyagi Prefecture. Hariu graduated from Tohoku University with a degree in literature in 1948, before going on to attend graduate school at Tokyo University. While in graduate school, he participated in the Yoru no Kai ("Nighttime Society") literary society alongside Tarō Okamoto, Kiyoteru Hanada, Kōbō Abe, and others. In 1953, Hariu followed the majority of other writers and artists in Japan in joining the Japan Communist Party, as a way of expiating his shame for having supported wartime Japanese militarism.

== Career ==
As an art critic, Hariu initially supported art that adhered the Communist party's policies of promoting socialist revolution. However, over time he became increasingly opposed to JCP policies and supported the emergence of avant-garde art that broke free from conventional styles of socialist realism and Communist party orthodoxy. As early as 1953, Hariu complained that the socialist realist art promoted by the party "lacked originality." In the late 1950s, Hariu became one of the first Japanese Marxist critics to embrace Abstract Expressionism and Art Informel. Hariu supported the Anpo protests in 1960, but opposed the passive role taken by the JCP. In 1961, Hariu was expelled from the party for joining other writers in criticizing the party's political and cultural policies, and in 1962, he joined other art prominent critics in protesting the implementation of new restrictions on the previously freewheeling and unregulated Yomiuri Indépendant Exhibition.

As his stature in Japan's art and literary community grew, Hariu became involved in professional associations and organizing international art exhibitions. In 1968, he served as commissioner of the Japanese pavilion for the Venice Biennale, and served in a similar capacity for the Sao Paulo Biennale in 1977 and 1977. Hariu was opposed, however, to the participation of artists in the state-sponsored Expo '70 and declined to take part. Hariu was an active participant in the New Japanese Literature Association (Shin Nihon Bungakkai) for more than five decades, and was the Association's chairman when it dissolved in 2005.

In 2005, Hariu starred in Nobuyuki Ōura's avant-garde documentary film The Heart of Japan: Ichirō Hariu, the Man Who Embraced the Whole of Japan ( 日本心中: 針生一郎・日本を丸ごと抱え込んでしまった男), a 90-min fantastical film exploring the correlation between self and otherness and the many layers of Japan's history by following Hariu as he walks around Gwangju, South Korea.

Hariu died of heart failure on May 26, 2010, at the age of 84.
