= Takako Nakamoto =

Japanese novelist (1903-1991)

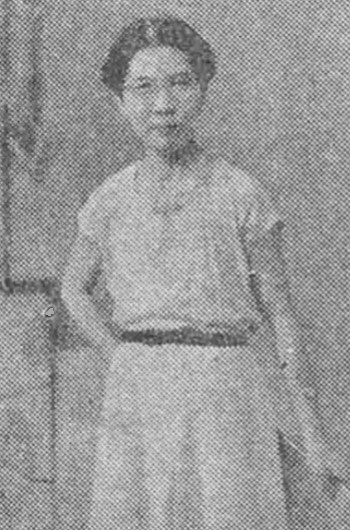
Takako Nakamoto

Takako Nakamoto (中本 たか子; November 19, 1903 – September 28, 1991) was a Japanese novelist and activist. She is best known for writing proletariat literature before World War II, and after the war, she became known for writing about political protests.

== Early life and education ==
Nakamoto was born in Yamaguchi prefecture on November 19, 1903. Her father was a retired army officer who taught physical education at a middle school. After graduating from Yamaguchi Koto Jogakko, she worked as an elementary school teacher in Yamaguchi.

== Career ==
In 1927, Nakamoto moved to Tokyo and wrote for the Nyonin Geijutsu. While living in Tokyo she incited textile workers to strike for the right to leave their hostel at night. After that she was arrested for her involvement with the Communist Party, but she did not officially join the party until 1960, after the changes to the Japanese government that happened after World War II. The stories she wrote during this period are often associated with the proletarian literature movement. She wrote Hakui Sagyo (白衣 作業) in 1937, which was one of the first books written about female prisoners.

Under pressure from the Japanese military government to produce works that support the war movement, she pivoted from writing proletarian literature to writing productivity literature (生産文学). These novels often focused on the experience of ironworkers.

In 1941, Nakamoto married Korehito Kurahara. They had two children.

After World War II, Nakamoto wrote about her experiences in prison and under police surveillance. She also began writing about protests and demonstrations, such as the Sunagawa struggle. Her book Watashi no Anpo Toso Nikki (わたしの安保闘争日記) was about her work protesting against the Treaty of Mutual Cooperation and Security Between the United States and Japan. Throughout her career her works were nominated for the Bungei Shunjun award, the Akutagawa Prize, and the Shinchosha Prize

Nakamoto died of bronchitis on September 28, 1991.
