= Ryosuke Nikamoto =

Japanese bassist

Ryosuke Nikamoto 二家本 亮介
- Born: January 16, 1986 (age 39); Iwakuni, Yamaguchi Prefecture, Japan
- Origin: Japan
- Genres: Rock; J-Pop; Funk; Jazz
- Occupation: Musician
- Instrument: Bass

Ryosuke Nikamoto (二家本 亮介; born January 16, 1986) is a Japanese bassist. He is a member of Japanese band UK Rampage (有形ランペイジ, Yūkei Ranpeiji), and is associated with multiple other Japanese acts including rock group ZUTOMAYO, jazz group DIMENSION, and vocaloid music producers Deco*27 and sasakure.UK.

Born in the city of Iwakuni, Yamaguchi Prefecture, Japan, Nikamoto studied at the MESAR HAUS music school. Upon graduating, he taught bass there for a while. Nikamoto now plays as a session musician and touring musician, proficient in both electric bass and upright (acoustic) bass.
