= Korehito Kurahara =

Japanese Marxist literary critic

- 蔵原惟人
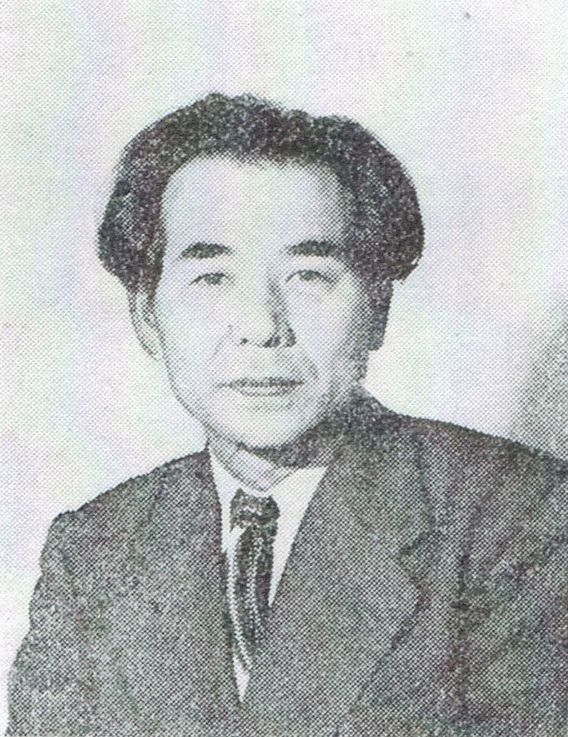
- Korehito Kurahara
- Born: January 26, 1902
- Died: January 25, 1991

Korehito Kurahara (蔵原 惟人, January 26, 1902 – January 25, 1991) was a Japanese Marxist literary critic. He wrote under the name Soichiro Furukawa.

== Early life and education ==
Kurahara was born in Tokyo on January 26, 1902. His father, Korehiro Kurahara, was a politician. Kurahara studied Russian at the Tokyo University of Foreign Studies before going to the Soviet Union to study Russian literature in 1925. While living in Russia he worked as a special correspondent for the Miyako Shinbun.

== Career ==
Kurahara returned from Russia in 1926 and began writing for Bungei Sensen. He joined the proletarian literature movement and began translating Marxist theories from Russian to Japanese. The proletarian literature movement at the time was struggling to decide whether political and arts organizations associated with the movement should remain separate or merge. In 1928 Kurahara spearheaded the movement to merge many of the organizations into one: the Zen Nihon Musansha Geijutsu Renmei.

Kurahara debated Marxist theory frequently, following in the footsteps of Hatsunosuke Hirabayashi and Suekichi Aono. He officially joined the Communist Party in 1929. However, he left Japan in June 1930 after a warrant was put out for his arrest. While he was away he attended the fifth Profintern congress. He returned in February 1931, after many other Communist Party leaders were arrested by the police.

When he returned to Japan, Kurahara continued writing and formed the Nihon Puroretaria Bunka Renmei, which was meant to reform society and create art groups in factories. This united all of the proletariat art groups into one organization. However, in 1932 Kurahara was arrested by the police for violating the Peace Preservation Law and the movement collapsed in 1934. He was released in 1940, and did not renounce his Marxist beliefs while imprisoned.

In 1941 he married Takako Nakamoto. They had two children. He was one of the founders of the New Japanese Literature Association in 1945. Despite being imprisoned for his beliefs, he also remained active in the Japanese Communist Party.

Kurahara died on January 25, 1991.
