= Tal-su Kim =

Korean writer (1920–1997)

- 金達寿, 김달수
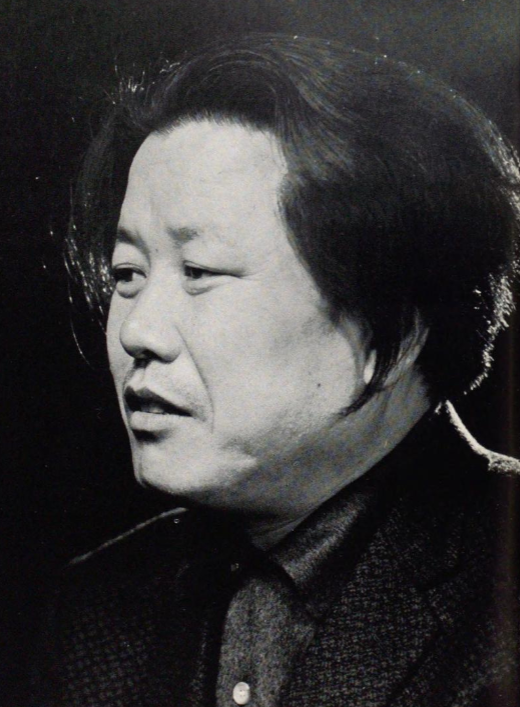
- Born: 1919
- Died: 1997 (aged 77–78)
- Citizenship: Korean
- Occupation: Writer
- Writing career
- Pen name: 金達寿, 大澤達雄, 金光淳, 朴永泰, 孫仁章, 金文洙, 白仁
- Language: Japanese, Korean

Tal-su Kim (金達寿、キム・タルス/キムダルス、김달수, Kimu Darusu/Tarusu) was a Korea-born, Japan-raised writer. He is considered the "founding father" of Resident Korean literature. He was born in Masanhoewon-gu. Although he spent most of his life in Japan, many of his literary works are set in Korea and explore the injustices of colonial rule and its painful aftermath.

== See also ==
- Korea under Japanese rule
- Koreans in Japan
- Yi Sang
