= Ayako Sono =

Japanese writer (1931–2025)

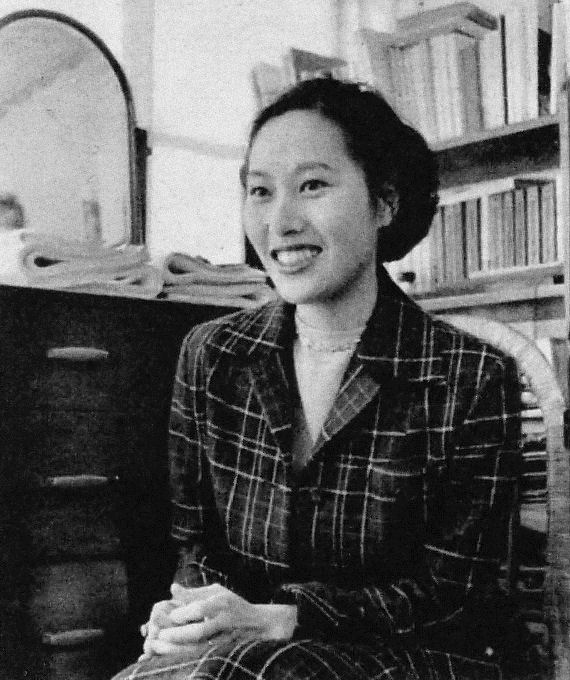
- Ayako Sono in 1956
- Born: Chizuko Machida; September 17, 1931; Katsushika, Tokyo, Japan
- Died: February 28, 2025 (aged 93); Tokyo, Japan
- Education: University of the Sacred Heart
- Spouse: Shumon Miura (m. 1953; died 2017)
- Writing career
- Years active: 1951 – 2022
- Notable works: Tamayura (たまゆら); Enrai no kyaku tachi (遠来の客たち)

Ayako Sono (曽野 綾子, Sono Ayako; September 17, 1931 – February 28, 2025) was a Japanese writer. She published numerous novels, essays and articles between the 1950s and the early 2020s.

Sono was also considered to be nationalist and conservative. She provoked controversy for advocating a system similar to South Africa's apartheid for Japan's immigrants. She also advocated for women to quit their jobs after becoming pregnant.

== Life and career ==
Sono was born in 1931. She went to the Catholic Sacred Heart School in Tokyo after elementary school.

During World War II, she evacuated to Kanazawa. After writing for the fanzines La Mancha and Shin-Shicho (新思潮: "New Thought"), she was recommended by Masao Yamakawa, an established critic at the time, to Mita Bungaku, for which she wrote Enrai No Kyaku Tachi (遠来の客たち: "Visitors from Afar"), one of the shortlisted stories for the Akutagawa Prize in 1954. In 1953, she married Shumon Miura, one of the members of Shin-Shicho.

The naming of The Bas Bleu Era (才女時代: Saijo-Jidai) by the writer and critic Yoshimi Usui described the prosperous activities of female writers including Sono and Sawako Ariyoshi.

In the history of Japanese literature, Sono belongs to the category of "the Third Generation" together with Shūsaku Endō, Shōtarō Yasuoka, Junnosuke Yoshiyuki, Nobuo Kojima, Junzo Shono, Keitaro Kondo, Hiroyuki Agawa, Shumon Miura, Tan Onuma, and Toshio Shimao.

She was awarded the Pro Ecclesia et Pontifice in 1979. She founded an NGO named “Kaigai-senkyosha-katsudo-enjo-koenkai” (JOMAS: Japan Overseas Missionaries Assistance Society) to help Japanese missionaries devoting their lifetime in foreign countries.

In 2000, she welcomed Alberto Fujimori, ex-President of Peru from 1990 to 2000, to stay at her house after his exile.

She was selected as a Person of Cultural Merits in 2003, following her husband's honor in 1999.

=== Politics ===
After the death of Ryoichi Sasakawa, one of the biggest rightist leaders, Sono took over his position as the head of the Nippon Foundation in 1996. The foundation's funds come from 3 percent of the profits of the boat races all over Japan. As the chairperson, she focused on welfare and assistance of undeveloped countries, until 30 June 2005, when her term of office finally expired after nine and a half years. The position of the foundation chairman was taken over by Yohei Sasakawa.

She was nominated as director of the Japan Post Holding Co.'s board by Shizuka Kamei, minister in charge of postal reform, in October 2009.

She was appointed to one of 15 members of an education reform panel in January 2013, a position from which she resigned in October of that year.

Sono drew criticism for a column she wrote in the Japanese far-right Sankei Shimbun newspaper in February 2015, in which she held South Africa's apartheid as an example of how Japan should handle immigration. She stated that while she was "supportive" of the "need to bring in immigrants to ease the shortage of workers to care for Japan's ballooning elderly population", she also advocated non-Asian immigrants such as whites and blacks to Japan be separated from the general population and made to live in special zones amongst themselves.

On February 28, 2025, Sono died at a hospital in Tokyo. She was 93.

== Works ==
=== Novels ===
Her major novels include

- Tamayura (たまゆら: Transience), which portrays the nihilistic daily life of man and woman
- Satōgashi ga Kowareru Toki (砂糖菓子が壊れるとき: When a Sweetmeat Breaks), modeled on Marilyn Monroe and made into a film starring Ayako Wakao
- Mumeihi (無名碑: A Nameless Monument), featuring the construction sites of the Tagokura Dam and the Asian Highway
- Kizu-tsuita-ashi (傷ついた葦: Bruised Reed), which describes in a most dry style a life of a Catholic father
- Kyokō-no-ie (虚構の家: The House of Fiction), depicting domestic violence
- Tarō-Monogatari (太郎物語: Taro Story), which features her son Taro as the protagonist
- Kami-No-Yogoreta-Te (神の汚れた手: The Soiled Hands of the god, translated into English as The Watcher from the Shore (ISBN 0-87011-938-9)), on the themes of abortion and dignity of life problems, with a gynecologist as the protagonist
- Tenjō-no-ao (天上の青: Heavenly Blue, translated into English as No Reason for Murder (ISBN 4-925080-63-6), a crime novel based on real serial murder and rape cases by a man named Kiyoshi Ōkubo, on the extremes of love
- Kyō-ō-Herode (狂王ヘロデ: Herod the Mad), which portrays the half life of Herod the Great, who is notorious for the Massacre of the Innocents, through the eye of a mute lute player called "Ana" (hole)
- Aika (哀歌: Lamentations), a record of the dramatic experience of a nun named Haruna, who encountered the Rwanda Genocide
- Kiseki (奇蹟: Miracles, translated into English as Miracles: A Novel (ISBN 1-93738-588-4)), a work of travel fiction set in Poland and Italy in pursuit of the miracles ascribed to St. Maximilian Kolbe

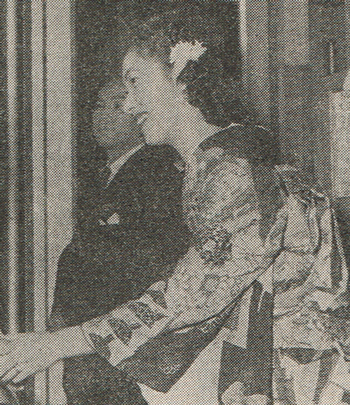
Sono on her wedding day, October 1953

=== Short stories ===
- Nagai-kurai-fuyu (長い暗い冬: Long, Dark Winter)
- Rakuyō-no-koe (落葉の声: The Voice of Falling Leaves), which describes the end of Father Maximilian Kolbe
- Tadami-gawa (只見川: The River Tadami), which describes a love torn apart by World War II

=== Essays ===
- Dare-no-tame-ni-aisuruka? (誰のために愛するか: For Whom Do You Love?)
- Kairō-roku (戒老録: A note of Admonition to the Old)
- II-hito-o-yameruto-raku-ni-naru (「いい人」をやめると楽になる: Stop Being ”Nice”, and You'll Be Liberated), a collection of epigrams
- "Ningen no Bunzai." A collection of writings.
