= Shigeharu Nakano =

Japanese writer and politician (1902–1979)

- 中野 重治
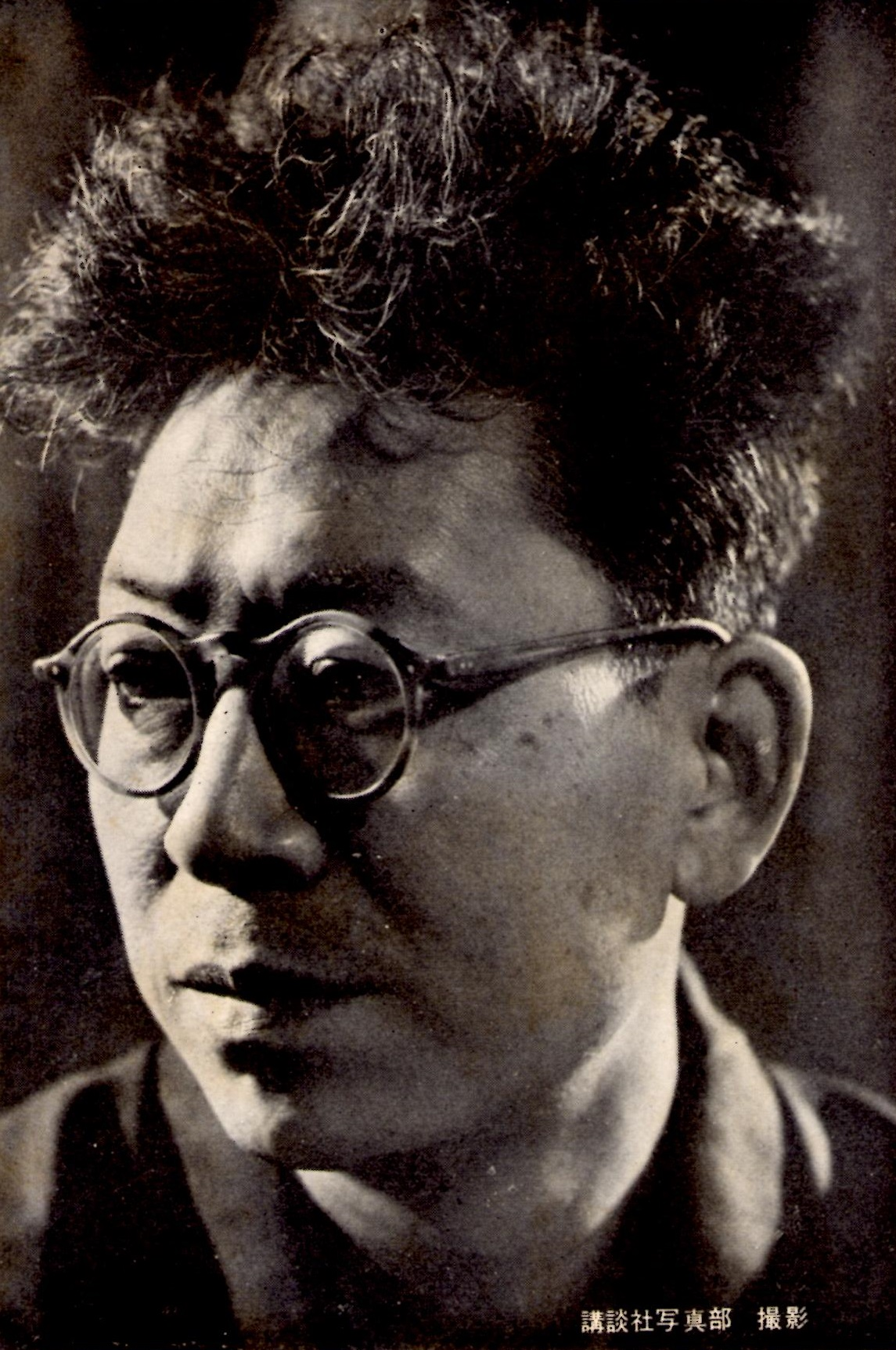

Member of the House of Councillors
- In office 3 May 1947 – 2 May 1950
- Preceded by: Constituency established
- Succeeded by: Multi-member district
- Constituency: National district

Personal details
- Born: 25 January 1902 Sakai, Fukui, Japan
- Died: 24 August 1979 (aged 77) Shinjuku, Tokyo, Japan
- Party: Communist (1931–1964)
- Education: Tokyo Imperial University

Shigeharu Nakano (中野 重治, Nakano Shigeharu; 25 January 1902 – 24 August 1979) was a Japanese writer and Japanese Communist Party (JCP) politician.

Nakano was born in Maruoka, now part of Sakai, Fukui. In 1914, he enrolled in middle school in Fukui, Fukui, and attended high school in Hiratsuka, Kanagawa and Kanazawa, Ishikawa. In 1924, he entered the German literature department of the University of Tokyo. In 1931, he joined the Japanese Communist Party, for which he was arrested in 1934. Immediately after World War II, he rejoined the party and played a leading role in founding the JCP-affiliated literary society New Japanese Literature Association (Shin Nihon Bungakkai). In 1947, Nakano began a three-year term as elected representative to the government. In 1958, he was elected to the party's Central Committee, but in 1964 was expelled due to political conflicts. Nakano was one of the most prominent figures in the proletarian literary movement that dominated the Japanese literary field from mid 1920's to early 1930's.

His autobiographical novels include Nami no aima (Between the Waves, 1930), Muragimo (In the Depths of the Heart, 1954), and Kō otsu hei tei (ABCD, 1965-1969). Nakano received the 1959 Yomiuri Prize for Nashi no hana. Following his arrest, he published a novella titled Shōsetsuka no kakenu shōsetsuka (The Novelist Who Can't Write a Novel, 1977) in which he offers glimpses of the authoritarian concerns surrounding deletion marks in writing. Three more of his other works, translated by Brett de Bary, include Mura no ie (The House in the Village, 1979), Goshaku no sake (Five Cups of Sake), and Hagi no monkakiya (The Crest-painter of Hagi).
