= Takeo Okuno =

Japanese literary critic

- 奥野 健男
- Born: July 25, 1926; Tokyo, Empire of Japan
- Died: November 26, 1997 (aged 71)
- Resting place: Tama Cemetery
- Education: Tokyo Institute of Technology
- Occupation: Literary critic
- Writing career
- Language: Japanese
- Notable works: Osamu Dazai Theory (1952); "The Bankruptcy of 'Politics and Literature' Theory" (1963); Primary Landscapes in Literature (1972)

Takeo Okuno (奥野 健男, Okuno Takeo; July 25, 1926–November 26, 1997), was a Japanese chemist and a leading literary critic of the postwar era. A close friend of philosopher Takaaki Yoshimoto and writer Yukio Mishima, he helped draw attention to a new generation of postwar Japanese authors and push the Japanese literary world to break free from hegemonic ideologies and pursue more individualistic forms of expression.

== Early life and scientific career ==
Takeo Okuno was born in Tokyo on July 25, 1926, the son of Japanese jurist and future Supreme Court justice Ken'ichi Okuno. In high school he developed an interest in science, enrolling in the Tokyo Institute of Technology where he graduated in 1953 with a degree in organic chemistry. While at university, Okuno became friends with the poet, literary critic, and philosopher Takaaki Yoshimoto. After graduating, Okuno joined Toshiba corporation's Central Research Laboratory, where he conducted research on transistors. For his scientific research, Okuno was awarded the Okochi Memorial Technology Award in 1959, the Science and Technology Agency Commissioner's Encouragement Award in 1963, and the Patent Office Commissioner's Award in 1964. In 1961, Okuno was hired as an assistant professor by Tama Art University, later receiving promotions to associate professor in 1962 and full professor in 1970. Although Okuno was originally hired to teach science courses, as his reputation as a literary critic grew, he gradually switched to teaching more and more courses on Japanese literature.

== Career as a literary critic ==
In 1952, while still in college, Okuno had already attracted attention from the Japanese literary world for his influential essay "Osamu Dazai Theory" (Dazai Osamu ron), originally published in the journal Ōokayama Bungaku. Beginning with this essay, Okuno became known as one of the foremost practitioners of "individual author theory," later writing similar books on other notable authors, such as Ango Sakaguchi (1972) and Sei Itō (1980). In 1954, he helped co-found the journal Contemporary Criticism (現代評論, Gendai Hyо̄ron) along with literary critic Tatsu Hattori and others, and in 1958, he launched the similarly named journal Contemporary Critique (現代批評, Gendai Hihyо̄) with Takaaki Yoshimoto and others.

In the early 1960s, following the 1960 Anpo protests, Okuno became a leading figure in an effort to divorce literature from politics, above all the politics of the Japan Communist Party and its dictum that all literature should serve the cause of socialist revolution. In a 1963 essay titled "The Bankruptcy of 'Politics and Literature' Theory,” Okuno urged Japanese authors to move away from a view of "literature as but one aspect of politics" to "politics as but one aspect of literature." Calling on writers to develop "literary autonomy," Okuno praised Kōbō Abe's book The Woman in the Dunes (Suna no onna) and Yukio Mishima's book A Beautiful Star (Utsukushii hoshi) as "epoch-making" works that had broken free of ideology and dogma to explore the authors' own subjectivities, whereas he criticized works by books by Yoshie Hotta and Hiroshi Noma as "failed works of non-literature" for being too blatantly political. Okuno was supported in this stance by other noted literary critics including Kōichi Isoda and Takaaki Yoshimoto, and despite a fierce debate initially, by 1964 most of the Japanese literary world had moved firmly into Okuno's camp.

In 1972, Okuno proposed his well-known theory of "primary landscape" (原風景, gen fūkei), which remains an important concept today in the analysis of Japanese literature. From 1976 to 1991, Okuno was the literary editor for the Sankei Shimbun newspaper. In 1984, his book The Structure of 'Ma' (〈間〉の構造, 'Ma' no kōzō) won the Taiko Hirabayashi Literary Award, and in 1994, his book The Legend of Yukio Mishima won an Art Encouragement Prize from the Cultural Affairs Agency.

In 1991 Okuno was appointed as a trustee of Tama Art University. He retired from teaching in September 1997 but died of liver failure two months later. He was posthumously awarded the Order of the Rising Sun, Gold Rays with Rosette.
