= Japanese literature =

Japanese literature throughout most of its history has been influenced by cultural contact with neighboring Asian literatures, most notably China and its literature. Early texts were often written in pure Classical Chinese or kanbun (漢文, lit. 'Chinese writing'), a style of Classical Chinese influenced by Japanese. Indian literature also had an influence through the spread of Buddhism in Japan.

During the Heian period, Japan's original kokufū culture (lit. 'national culture') developed and literature also established its own style, with the significant usage and development of kana (仮名) to write Japanese literature.

Following the end of the sakoku policy and especially during the increasing westernization of the Meiji era, Western literature has also had an influence on the development of modern Japanese writers, while Japanese literature has in turn become more recognized internationally, leading to two Japanese Nobel laureates in literature, namely Yasunari Kawabata and Kenzaburō Ōe. (Note: Kazuo Ishiguro, although an ethnic Japanese born in Japan, became a British citizen in 1983. Consequently, he lost his Japanese citizenship, as Japan does not permit dual citizenships. He won the Nobel Prize in Literature in 2017.)

== History ==
=== Nara-period literature (before 794) ===
Before the introduction of kanji from China to Japan, Japan had no writing system; it is believed that Chinese characters came to Japan at the very beginning of the 5th century, brought by immigrants from Korea and China. Early Japanese texts first followed the Chinese model, before gradually transitioning to a hybrid of Chinese characters used in Japanese syntactical formats, resulting in sentences written with Chinese characters but read phonetically in Japanese.

Chinese characters were also further adapted, creating what is known as man'yōgana, the earliest form of kana, or Japanese syllabic writing. The earliest literary works in Japan were created in the Nara period. These include the Kojiki (712), a historical record that also chronicles ancient Japanese mythology and folk songs; the Nihon Shoki (720), a chronicle written in Chinese that is significantly more detailed than the Kojiki; and the Man'yōshū (759), a poetry anthology. One of the stories they describe is the tale of Urashima Tarō.

=== Heian literature (794–1185) ===
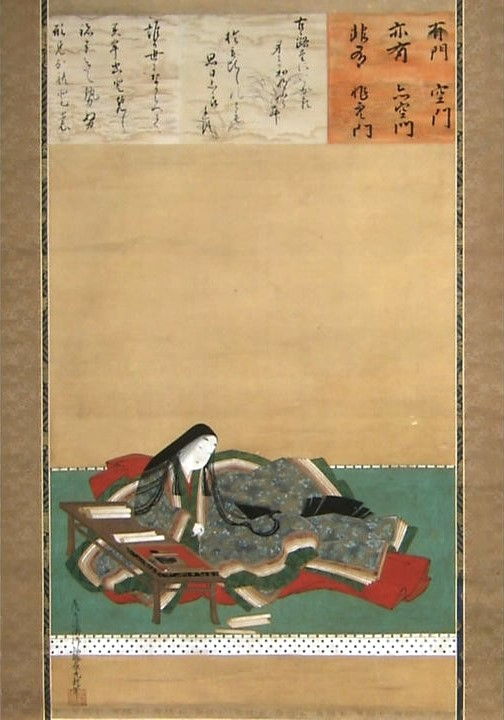
Murasaki Shikibu, the author of The Tale of Genji

The Heian period has been referred to as the golden era of art and literature in Japan. During this era, literature became centered on a cultural elite of nobility and monks. Chinese-language poetry (kanshi) remained prominent among courtiers and Buddhist monks. The imperial court particularly patronized the poets, most of whom were courtiers or ladies-in-waiting. Ono no Komachi and Ariwara no Narihira were Six Poetic Geniuses known for love poetry. Reflecting the aristocratic atmosphere, the poetry was elegant and sophisticated and expressed emotions in a rhetorical style. Editing the resulting anthologies of poetry soon became a national pastime. Heian court poetry competitions (uta-awase) judged waka on assigned topics. The iroha poem, now one of two standard orderings for the Japanese syllabary, was also developed during the early Heian period. Both men and women used kana alongside kanji in literature.

The Tale of Genji (Genji Monogatari), written in the early 11th century by female courtier Murasaki Shikibu, is considered the pre-eminent novel of Heian fiction. Bai Juyi's Song of Everlasting Regret influenced The Tale of Genji. The Tales of Ise combines short prose narratives with waka poems. The twenty-volume Utsubo Monogatari follows koto musicians and noble courtship. Other important writings of this period include the Kokin Wakashū (905), a waka-poetry anthology, and The Pillow Book (Makura no Sōshi; 990s). The Kokin Wakashū, Japan's first imperial poetry anthology, was compiled under Emperor Daigo. Tosa Nikki (935) recounts Ki no Tsurayuki's journey through prose and waka. The Gosen Wakashū (951), being the second imperial anthology, was compiled by five poets for Emperor Murakami, with private poetry exchanges forming much of its court poetry. Thirdly, the Shūi Wakashū (c. 1005), the third imperial anthology, expanded collection by Fujiwara no Kintō to 1,351 poems. The Pillow Book was written by Sei Shōnagon, Murasaki Shikibu's contemporary and rival, as an essay about the life, loves, and pastimes of nobles in the Emperor's court. Murasaki Shikibu's The Diary of Lady Murasaki describes Empress Shōshi's court. Kagerō Nikki (c. 974) recounts the Michitsuna's mother marriage. Sarashina Nikki, written by the daughter of Sugawara no Takasue, recorded her life from the age of 12 to her fifties. Izumi Shikibu Nikki, credited to Izumi Shikibu, includes prose, waka, Renga, and over a hundred love poems from her to Prince Atsumichi in the early 11th century. Another notable piece of fictional Japanese literature was Konjaku Monogatarishū, a collection of over a thousand stories in 31 volumes. The volumes cover various tales from India, China and Japan. Eiga Monogatari is a forty-volume historical narrative of disputed authorship and credited partly to Akazome Emon, describing the rise of the Fujiwara clan, particularly Fujiwara no Michinaga. Also, Ōkagami recounts the history of the Fujiwara using a frame story of conversations between elderly narrators.

The Tale of the Bamboo Cutter depicts visitors from the Moon and is considered a precursor to science fiction. Kaguya-hime, a Moon princess sent to Japan and raised by a bamboo cutter, returns to her extraterrestrial family in a flying saucer-like craft.

The early ninth-century Nihon Ryōiki, compiled by the Buddhist monk Kyōkai, is a collection of setsuwa tales about miracles and karmic retribution and incorporates Chinese Buddhist texts.

=== Kamakura-Muromachi period literature (1185–1603) ===
During the Kamakura period (1185–1333), Japan experienced many civil wars which led to the development of a warrior class, and subsequent war tales, histories, and related stories. Work from this period is notable for its more somber tone compared to the works of previous eras, with themes of life and death, simple lifestyles, and redemption through killing.The Tale of the Heike recounts the Genpei War and survives in Kakuichi's 1371 recension.

Despite a decline in the importance of the imperial court, aristocratic literature remained the center of Japanese culture at the beginning of the Kamakura period. Many literary works were marked by a nostalgia for the Heian period. The Kamakura period also saw a renewed vitality of poetry, with a number of anthologies compiled, such as the Shin Kokin Wakashū compiled in the early 1200s. However, there were fewer notable works by female authors during this period, reflecting the lowered status of women.

As the importance of the imperial court continued to decline, a major feature of Muromachi literature (1333–1603) was the spread of cultural activity through all levels of society. Classical court literature, which had been the focal point of Japanese literature up until this point, gradually disappeared. New genres such as renga, or linked verse, and Noh theater developed among the common people, The development of roads, along with a growing public interest in travel and pilgrimages, brought rise to the greater popularity of travel literature from the early 13th to 14th centuries. Notable examples of travel diaries include Fuji kikō (1432) and Tsukushi michi no ki (1480).

=== Edo-period literature (1603–1868) ===
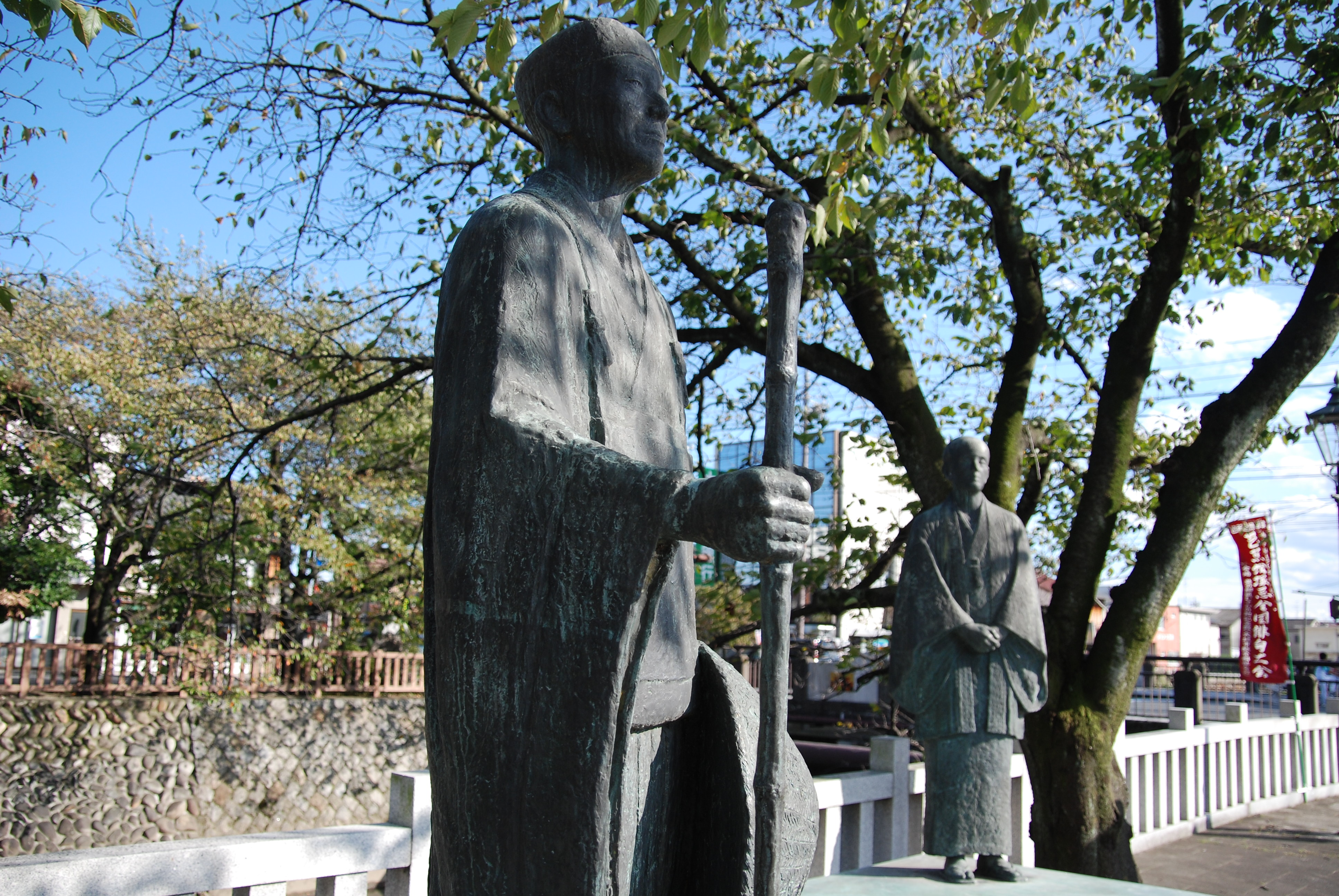
Matsuo Bashō, a haikai poet

Literature during this time was written during the largely peaceful Tokugawa shogunate (commonly referred to as the Edo period). Due in large part to the rise of the working and middle classes in the new capital of Edo (modern Tokyo), forms of popular drama developed which would later evolve into kabuki. The jōruri and kabuki dramatist Chikamatsu Monzaemon (1653–1725) became popular at the end of the 17th century, and he is also known as Japan's Shakespeare.

Many different genres of literature made their debut during the Edo period, helped by a rising literacy rate among the growing population of townspeople, as well as the development of lending libraries. Ihara Saikaku (1642–1693) might be said to have given birth to the modern consciousness of the novel in Japan, mixing vernacular dialogue into his humorous and cautionary tales of the pleasure quarters, the so-called Ukiyozōshi ("floating world") genre. Ihara's Life of an Amorous Man is considered the first work in this genre. Although Ihara's works were not regarded as high literature at the time because it had been aimed towards and popularized by the chōnin (merchant classes), they became popular and were key to the development and spread of ukiyozōshi.

Matsuo Bashō (1644–1694) is recognized as the greatest master of haiku (then called hokku). His poems were influenced by his firsthand experience of the world around him, often encapsulating the feeling of a scene in a few simple elements. He made his life's work the transformation of haikai into a literary genre. For Bashō, haikai involved a combination of comic playfulness and spiritual depth, ascetic practice, and involvement in human society. In particular, Bashō wrote Oku no Hosomichi, a major work in the form of a travel diary, considered "one of the major texts of classical Japanese literature."

Fukuda Chiyo-ni (1703–1775) is widely regarded as one of the greatest haiku poets. Before her time, haiku by women were often dismissed and ignored. Her dedication toward her career not only paved a way for her career but it also opened a path for other women to follow. Her early poems were influenced by Matsuo Bashō, although she did later develop her own unique style as an independent figure in her own right. While still a teenager, she had already become very popular all over Japan for her poetry. Her poems, although mostly dealing with nature, work for unity of nature with humanity. Her own life was that of the haikai poets who made their lives and the world they lived in one with themselves, living a simple and humble life. She was able to make connections by being observant and carefully studying the unique things around her ordinary world and writing them down.

Rangaku was an intellectual movement situated in Edo and centered on the study of Dutch (and by subsequently western) science and technology, history, philosophy, art, and language, based primarily on the Dutch books imported via Nagasaki. The polymath Hiraga Gennai (1728–1780) was a scholar of rangaku and a writer of popular fiction. Sugita Genpaku (1733–1817) was a Japanese scholar known for his translation of Kaitai Shinsho (New Book of Anatomy) from the Dutch-language anatomy book Ontleedkundige Tafelen. As a full-blown translation from a Western language, it was the first of its kind in Japan. Although there was a minor Western influence trickling into the country from the Dutch settlement at Nagasaki, it was the importation of Chinese vernacular fiction that proved the greatest outside influence on the development of Early Modern Japanese fiction.

Jippensha Ikku (1765–1831) is known as Japan's Mark Twain and wrote Tōkaidōchū Hizakurige, which is a mix of travelogue and comedy. Tsuga Teisho, Takebe Ayatari, and Okajima Kanzan were instrumental in developing the yomihon, which were historical romances almost entirely in prose, influenced by Chinese vernacular novels such as Sangoku-shi (三国志, Three Kingdoms) and Suikoden (水滸伝, Water Margin).

Two yomihon masterpieces were written by Ueda Akinari (1734–1809): Ugetsu Monogatari and Harusame Monogatari. Kyokutei Bakin (1767–1848) wrote the extremely popular fantasy/historical romance Nansō Satomi Hakkenden over a period of twenty-eight years to complete (1814–1842), in addition to other yomihon. Santō Kyōden wrote yomihon mostly set in the red-light districts until the Kansei edicts banned such works, and he turned to comedic kibyōshi. Genres included horror, crime stories, morality stories, comedy, and pornography — often accompanied by colorful woodcut prints.

Hokusai (1760–1849), perhaps Japan's most famous woodblock print artist, also illustrated fiction as well as his famous 36 Views of Mount Fuji.

Nevertheless, in the Tokugawa period, as in earlier periods, scholarly work continued to be published in Chinese, which was the language of the learned much as Latin was in Europe.

=== Meiji, Taishō, and early Shōwa-period literature (1868–1945) ===
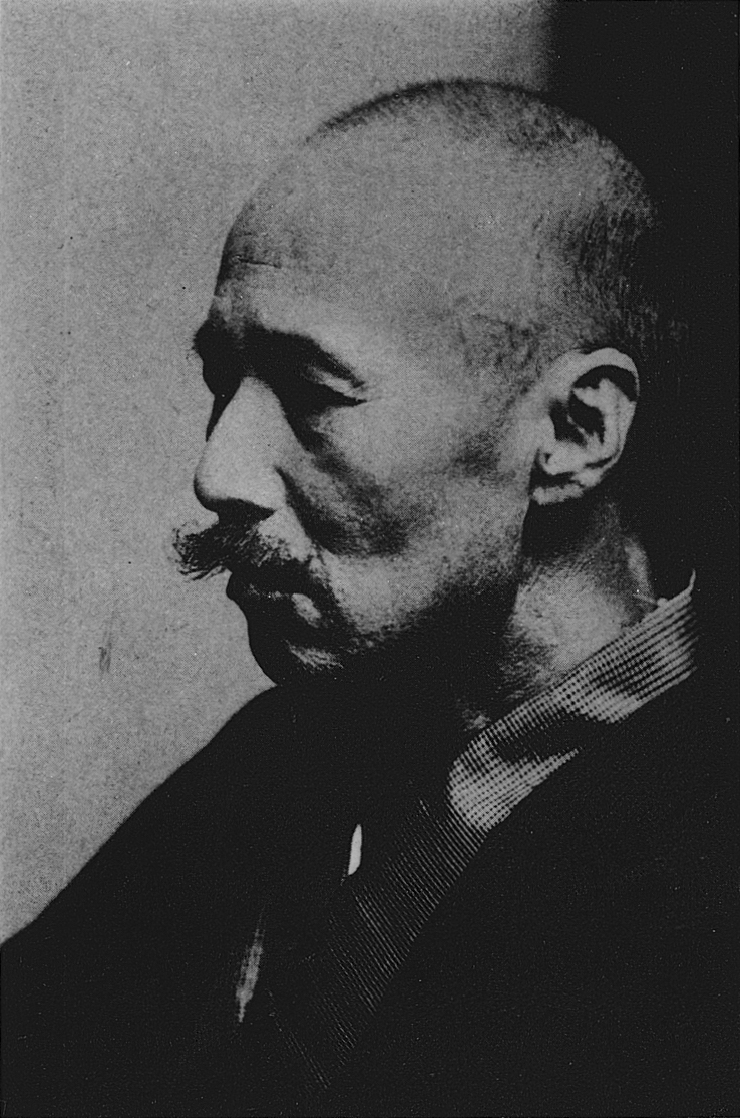
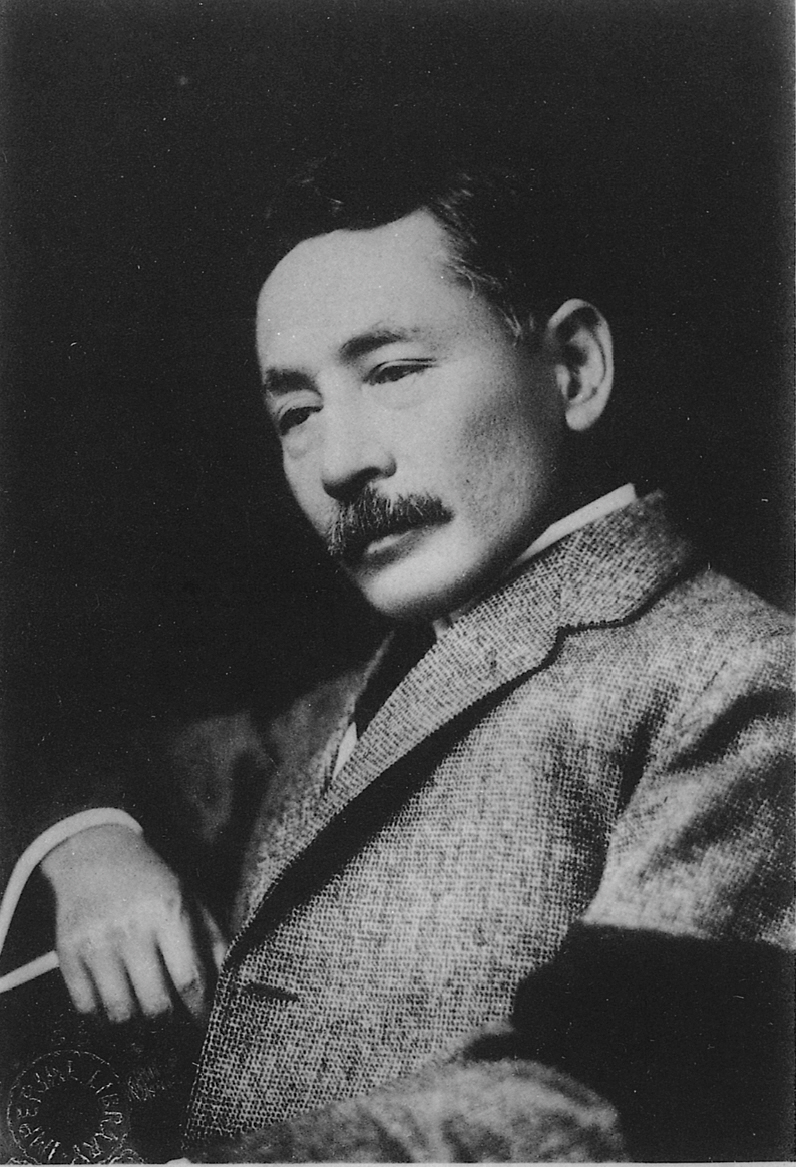
Mori Ōgai (left) and Natsume Sōseki (right)

The Meiji period marked the re-opening of Japan to the West, ending over two centuries of national seclusion, and marking the beginning of a period of rapid industrialization. The introduction of European literature brought free verse into the poetic repertoire. It became widely used for longer works embodying new intellectual themes. Young Japanese prose writers and dramatists faced a suddenly-broadened horizon of new ideas and artistic schools, with novelists amongst some of the first to assimilate these concepts successfully into their writing.

Natsume Sōseki's (1867–1916) humorous novel Wagahai wa neko de aru (I Am a Cat, 1905) employed a cat as the narrator, and he also wrote the famous novels Botchan (1906) and Kokoro (1914). Natsume, Mori Ōgai, and Shiga Naoya, who was called "god of the novel" as the most prominent "I novel" writer, were instrumental in adopting and adapting Western literary conventions and techniques. Ryūnosuke Akutagawa is known especially for his historical short stories. Ozaki Kōyō, Kyōka Izumi, and Ichiyo Higuchi represent a strain of writers whose style hearkens back to early-Modern Japanese literature.

In the early Meiji period (1868–1880s), Fukuzawa Yukichi authored Enlightenment literature, while pre-modern popular books depicted the quickly changing country. Realism was brought in by Tsubouchi Shōyō and Futabatei Shimei in the mid-Meiji period (late 1880s–early 1890s) while the Classicism of Ozaki Kōyō, Yamada Bimyo and Kōda Rohan gained popularity. Ichiyō Higuchi, a rare female writer in this era, wrote short stories on powerless women of this age in a simple style in between literary and colloquial. Kyōka Izumi, a favored disciple of Ozaki, pursued a flowing and elegant style and wrote early novels such as The Operating Room (1895) in literary style and later ones including The Holy Man of Mount Koya (1900) in colloquial language.

Romanticism was brought in by Mori Ōgai with his anthology of translated poems (1889) and carried to its height by Tōson Shimazaki, alongside magazines such as Myōjō and Bungaku-kai in the early 1900s. Mori also wrote some modern novels including The Dancing Girl (1890), The Wild Geese (1911), then later wrote historical novels. Natsume Sōseki, who is often compared with Mori Ōgai, wrote I Am a Cat (1905) with humor and satire, then depicted fresh and pure youth in Botchan (1906) and Sanshirō (1908). He eventually pursued transcendence of human emotions and egoism in his later works including Kokoro (1914) and his last and unfinished novel Light and darkness (1916).

Shimazaki shifted from Romanticism to Naturalism which was established with his The Broken Commandment (1906) and Katai Tayama's Futon (1907). Naturalism hatched "I Novel" (Watakushi-shōsetu) that describes the authors themselves and depicts their own mental states. Neo-romanticism came out of anti-naturalism and was led by Kafū Nagai, Jun'ichirō Tanizaki, Kōtarō Takamura, Hakushū Kitahara and others in the early 1910s. Saneatsu Mushanokōji, Naoya Shiga and others founded a magazine Shirakaba in 1910. They shared a common characteristic, Humanism. Shiga's style was autobiographical and depicted states of his mind and sometimes classified as "I Novel" in this sense. Ryūnosuke Akutagawa, who was highly praised by Soseki, wrote short stories including Rashōmon (1915) with an intellectual and analytic attitude and represented Neo-realism in the mid-1910s.

During the 1920s and early 1930s the proletarian literary movement, comprising such writers as Takiji Kobayashi, Denji Kuroshima, Yuriko Miyamoto and Ineko Sata produced a politically radical literature depicting the harsh lives of workers, peasants, women, and other downtrodden members of society, and their struggles for change.

Pre-war Japan saw the debut of several authors best known for the beauty of their language and their tales of love and sensuality, notably Jun'ichirō Tanizaki and Japan's first winner of the Nobel Prize for Literature, Yasunari Kawabata, a master of psychological fiction. Ashihei Hino wrote lyrical bestsellers glorifying the war, while Tatsuzō Ishikawa attempted to publish a disturbingly realistic account of the advance on Nanjing. Writers who opposed the war include Denji Kuroshima, Mitsuharu Kaneko, Hideo Oguma and Jun Ishikawa.

=== Postwar literature (1945–onwards) ===
World War II, and Japan's defeat, deeply influenced Japanese literature. Many authors wrote stories of disaffection, loss of purpose, and the coping with defeat. Haruo Umezaki's short story Sakurajima shows a disillusioned and skeptical Navy officer stationed in a base located on the Sakurajima volcanic island, close to Kagoshima, on the southern tip of Kyushu. Osamu Dazai's novel The Setting Sun is about a young woman whose family was previously part of the now fading aristocratic class, her fictional family mirroring the same class status of Dazai's real life family. Shōhei Ōoka won the Yomiuri Prize for his novel Fires on the Plain about a Japanese deserter going mad in the Philippine jungle. Yukio Mishima, well known for both his nihilistic writing and his controversial suicide by seppuku, began writing in the post-war period. Nobuo Kojima's short story "The American School" portrays a group of Japanese teachers of English who, in the immediate aftermath of the war, deal with the American occupation in varying ways.

Prominent writers of the 1970s and 1980s were identified with intellectual and moral issues in their attempts to raise social and political consciousness. One of them, Kenzaburō Ōe, who published one of his best-known works, A Personal Matter in 1964, became Japan's second winner of the Nobel Prize for Literature.

Mitsuharu Inoue had long been concerned with the atomic bomb and continued in the 1980s to write on problems of the nuclear age, while Shūsaku Endō depicted the religious dilemma of the Kakure Kirishitan, Roman Catholics in feudal Japan, as a springboard to address spiritual problems. Yasushi Inoue also turned to the past in masterful historical novels of Inner Asia and ancient Japan, in order to portray present human fate.

Avant-garde writers, such as Kōbō Abe, who wrote novels such as The Woman in the Dunes (1962), wanted to express the Japanese experience in modern terms without using either international styles or traditional conventions, developed new inner visions. Yoshikichi Furui related the lives of alienated urban dwellers coping with the minutiae of daily life, while the psychodramas within such daily life crises have been explored by a rising number of important women novelists. The 1988 Naoki Prize went to Shizuko Todo for Ripening Summer, a story capturing the complex psychology of modern women. Other award-winning stories at the end of the decade dealt with current issues of the elderly in hospitals, the recent past (Pure-Hearted Shopping District in Kōenji, Tokyo), and the life of a Meiji period ukiyo-e artist.

Haruki Murakami is one of the most popular and controversial of today's Japanese authors. His genre-defying, humorous and surreal works have sparked fierce debates in Japan over whether they are true "literature" or simple pop-fiction: Kenzaburō Ōe has been one of his harshest critics. Some of Murakami's best-known works include Norwegian Wood (1987) and The Wind-Up Bird Chronicle (1994–1995).

Banana Yoshimoto, a best-selling contemporary author whose "manga-esque" style of writing sparked much controversy when she debuted in the late 1980s, has come to be recognized as a unique and talented author over the intervening years. Her writing style stresses dialogue over description, resembling the script of a manga, and her works focus on love, friendship, and loss. Her breakout work was 1988's Kitchen.

Although modern Japanese writers covered a wide variety of subjects, one particularly Japanese approach stressed their subjects' inner lives, widening the earlier novel's preoccupation with the narrator's consciousness. In Japanese fiction, plot development and action have often been of secondary interest to emotional issues. In keeping with the general trend toward reaffirming national characteristics, many old themes re-emerged, and some authors turned consciously to the past. Strikingly, Buddhist attitudes about the importance of knowing oneself and the poignant impermanence of things formed an undercurrent to sharp social criticism of this material age. There was a growing emphasis on women's roles, the Japanese persona in the modern world, and the malaise of common people lost in the complexities of urban culture.

Popular fiction, non-fiction, and children's literature all flourished in urban Japan in the 1980s. Many popular works fell between "pure literature" and pulp novels, including all sorts of historical serials, information-packed docudramas, science fiction, mysteries, detective fiction, business stories, war journals, and animal stories. Non-fiction covered everything from crime to politics. Although factual journalism predominated, many of these works were interpretive, reflecting a high degree of individualism. Children's works re-emerged in the 1950s, and the newer entrants into this field, many of the younger women, brought new vitality to it in the 1980s.

Manga — Japanese comics — have penetrated almost every sector of the popular market. They include virtually every field of human interest, such as multivolume high-school histories of Japan and, additionally for the adult market, a manga introduction to economics, and pornography (hentai). Manga represented between 20 and 30 percent of annual publications at the end of the 1980s, in sales of some ¥400 billion per year. Light novels, a Japanese type of young adult novel, often feature plots and illustrations similar to those seen in manga. Dōjinshi are self-published works containing original or derivative material and distributed outside conventional manga publishing channels.

Literature utilizing new media began to appear at the end of the 20th century. Visual novels, a type of interactive fiction, were produced for personal computers beginning in the 1980s. Cell phone novels appeared in the early 21st century. Written by and for cell phone users, the novels — typically romances read by young women — have become very popular both online and in print. Some, such as Love Sky, have sold millions of print copies, and at the end of 2007 cell phone novels comprised four of the top five fiction best sellers.

== Female authors ==
Female writers in Japan enjoyed a brief period of success during the Heian period, but were undermined following the decline in power of the Imperial Court in the 14th century. Later, in the Meiji era, earlier works written by women such as Murasaki Shikibu and Sei Shonagon were championed amongst the earliest examples of the Japanese literary language, even at a time when the authors themselves experienced challenges due to their gender. One Meiji-period writer, Shimizu Shikin, sought to encourage positive comparisons between her contemporaries and their female forebears in the hopes that female authors would be viewed with respect by society, despite assuming a public role outside the traditional confines of a woman's role in her home (see Good Wife, Wise Mother). Other notable authors of the Meiji period included Hiratsuka Raicho, Higuchi Ichiyo, Tamura Toshiko, Nogami Yaeko and Yosano Akiko.

== Significant authors and works ==
=== Nara-period literature ===
- Kakinomoto no Hitomaro (c. 660–c. 720): authored numerous chōka and tanka in the Man'yōshū
- Ōtomo no Yakamochi (c. 718–785): possible compiler of the Man'yōshū

=== Heian-period literature ===
- Ariwara no Narihira (825–880)
- Ono no Komachi (c. 825 – c. 900)
- Sugawara no Michizane (845–903)
- Ki no Tsurayuki (872–945)
- Lady Ise (c. 875 – c. 938)
- Minamoto no Shitagō (911–983)
- Michitsuna no Haha (c. 935 – c. 995): author of Kagerō Nikki
- Akazome Emon (c. 956 – c. 1041)
- Sei Shōnagon (c. 966 – c. 1017): The Pillow Book
- Murasaki Shikibu (c. 973 – c. 1025): The Tale of Genji
- Izumi Shikibu (c. 976 – c. 1027):
- Lady Sarashina (c. 1008 – c. 1059): author of Sarashina Nikki
- Saigyō Hōshi (1118–1190)

=== Kamakura-Muromachi-period literature ===
- The Tale of the Heike (c. 1212–1309)
- Ogura Hyakunin Isshu (c. 1235)
- Fujiwara no Teika (1162–1241)
- Yoshida Kenkō (c. 1283–1352): Tsurezuregusa

=== Edo-period literature ===
- Miyamoto Musashi (c. 1584–1645): The Book of Five Rings
- Ihara Saikaku (1642–1693)
- Matsuo Bashō (1644–1694)
- Chikamatsu Monzaemon (1653–1725)
- Yamamoto Tsunetomo (1659–1719)
- Yokoi Yayū (1702–1783)
- Fukuda Chiyo-ni (1703–1775)
- Yosa Buson (1716–1784)
- Motoori Norinaga (1730–1801)
- Sugita Genpaku (1733–1817)
- Ueda Akinari (1734–1809)
- Santō Kyōden (1761–1816)
- Kobayashi Issa (1763–1828)
- Jippensha Ikku (1765–1831)
- Kyokutei Bakin (1767–1848)
- Edo Meisho Zue (illustrated topographical guide, 1834–1836)
- Hokuetsu Seppu (work of human geography, 1837)

=== Meiji- and Taisho-period literature ===
- Nakane Kōtei (1839–1913)
- Lafcadio Hearn (1850–1904)
- Mori Ōgai (1862–1922)
- Futabatei Shimei (1864–1909)
- Itō Sachio (1864–1913)
- Natsume Sōseki (1867–1916)
- Kōda Rohan (1867–1947)
- Masaoka Shiki (1867–1902)
- Ozaki Kōyō (1868–1903)
- Doppo Kunikida (1871–1908)
- Ichiyō Higuchi (1872–1896)
- Tōson Shimazaki (1872–1943)
- Kyōka Izumi (1873–1939)
- Yonejiro Noguchi (1875–1947)
- Takeo Arishima (1878–1923)
- Akiko Yosano (1878–1942)
- Kafū Nagai (1879–1959)
- Harukichi Shimoi (1883–1954)
- Naoya Shiga (1883–1971)
- Takuboku Ishikawa (1886–1912)
- Kan Kikuchi (1888–1948)
- Ryūnosuke Akutagawa (1892–1927)
- Kenji Miyazawa (1896–1933)
- Denji Kuroshima (1898–1943)
- Motojirō Kajii (1901–1932)
- Hideo Oguma (1901–1940)
- Takiji Kobayashi (1903–1933)

=== Modern literature ===
- Kansuke Naka (1885–1965)
- Yaeko Nogami (1885–1985)
- Jun'ichirō Tanizaki (1886–1965)
- Hyakken Uchida (1889–1971)
- Edogawa Ranpo (1894–1965)
- Eiji Yoshikawa (1892–1962)
- Mitsuharu Kaneko (1895–1975)
- Juza Unno (1897–1949)
- Shigeji Tsuboi (1897–1975)
- Chiyo Uno (1897–1996)
- Masuji Ibuse (1898–1993)
- Jun Ishikawa (1899–1987)
- Yasunari Kawabata (1899–1972)
- Yuriko Miyamoto (1899–1951)
- Sakae Tsuboi (1899–1967)
- Fumiko Hayashi (1903–1951)
- Michio Takeyama (1903–1984)
- Tamiki Hara (1905–1951)
- Tatsuzō Ishikawa (1905–1985)
- Fumiko Enchi (1905–1986)
- Ango Sakaguchi (1906–1955)
- Osamu Dazai (1909–1948)
- Shōhei Ōoka (1909–1988)
- Sakunosuke Oda (1913–1947)
- Haruo Umezaki (1915–1965)
- Ayako Miura (1922–1999)
- Shūsaku Endō (1923–1996)
- Ryōtarō Shiba (1923–1996)
- Kōbō Abe (1924–1993)
- Toyoko Yamasaki (1924–2013)
- Yukio Mishima (1925–1970)
- Osamu Tezuka (1928–1989)
- Akiyuki Nosaka (1930–2015)
- Sawako Ariyoshi (1931–1984)
- Ayako Sono (1931–2025)
- Shintaro Ishihara (1932–2022)
- Hisashi Inoue (1933–2010)
- Kenzaburō Ōe (1935–2023)
- Michiko Yamamoto (b. 1936)
- Kenji Nakagami (1946–1992)
- Haruki Murakami (b. 1949)
- Natsuo Kirino (b. 1951)
- Naoki Hyakuta (b. 1952)
- Ryū Murakami (b. 1952)
- Yōko Ogawa (b. 1962)
- Banana Yoshimoto (b. 1964)
- Mieko Kawakami (b. 1976)
- Sayaka Murata (b. 1979)
- Natsuko Imamura (b. 1980)
- Akira Otani (b. 1981)
- Ao Omae (b. 1992)

== Awards and contests ==
Japan has some literary contests and awards in which authors can participate and be awarded.

The Akutagawa Prize is one of the most prestigious literary awards, and receives wide attention from media.

== See also ==
- Aozora Bunko – A repository of Japanese literature
- Japanese detective fiction
- Japanese poetry
- Japanese science fiction
- Light novel
- List of Japanese classical texts
- List of Japanese writers

== General and cited references ==
- Aston, William George. A History of Japanese Literature, William Heinemann, 1899.
- Birnbaum, A., (ed.). Monkey Brain Sushi: New Tastes in Japanese Fiction. Kodansha International (JPN).
- Carol Fairbanks. Japanese Women Fiction Writers, Scarecrow Press, 2002. ISBN 0-8108-4086-3
- Donald Keene
  - Modern Japanese Literature, Grove Press, 1956. ISBN 0-394-17254-X
  - World Within Walls: Japanese Literature of The Pre-Modern Era 1600–1867, Columbia University Press. 1976, reprinted 1999 ISBN 0-231-11467-2
  - Dawn to the West: Japanese Literature in the Modern Era, Poetry, Drama, Criticism, Columbia University Press. 1984, reprinted 1998 ISBN 0-231-11435-4
  - Travellers of a Hundred Ages: The Japanese as Revealed Through 1,000 Years of Diaries, Columbia University Press. 1989, reprinted 1999 ISBN 0-231-11437-0
  - Seeds in the Heart: Japanese Literature from the Earliest Times to the Late Sixteenth Century, Columbia University Press. 1993, reprinted 1999 ISBN 0-231-11441-9
- McCullough, Helen Craig, Classical Japanese prose: an anthology, Stanford, Calif. : Stanford University Press, 1990, ISBN 0-8047-1628-5
- Miner, Earl Roy, Odagiri, Hiroko, and Morrell, Robert E., The Princeton companion to classical Japanese literature, Princeton, N.J. : Princeton University Press, 1985. ISBN 0-691-06599-3
- Okada, Sumie. Japanese Writers and the West, London: Palgrave Macmillan, 2003, ISBN 0-333-74310-5
- Ema Tsutomu, Taniyama Shigeru, Ino Kenji, Shinshū Kokugo Sōran (新修国語総覧) Kyoto Shobō. 1977, revised 1981, reprinted 1982
