= Haruo Umezaki =

Japanese writer

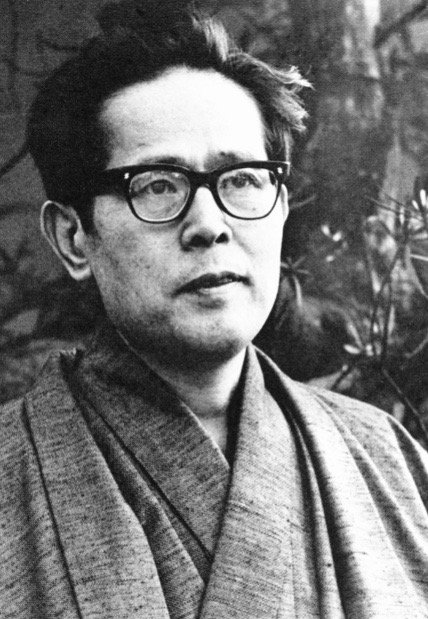
- Haruo Umezaki in 1965
- Born: February 15, 1915; Fukuoka, Kyushu, Japan
- Died: July 19, 1965 (aged 50); Tokyo, Japan
- Education: Tokyo Imperial University
- Occupation: Writer
- Writing career
- Period: 1939–1965

Haruo Umezaki (梅崎春生, Umezaki Haruo; February 15, 1915 – July 19, 1965) was a Japanese writer of short stories and novels.

== Biography ==
Born in Fukuoka, Kyushu, Umezaki studied at the 5th High School of Kumamoto University, later at the Tokyo Imperial University where he majored in Japanese literature. He then worked at the same Tokyo University in the Faculty of Education Sciences (kyōiku). In 1944, he was drafted as a crypto specialist for the Imperial Japanese Navy and stationed in Kagoshima Prefecture, Kyushu, an experience which he later dramatised in his famous novella Sakurajima, published in 1946. He drew on this experience in his last book, Genka (Illusions) published in 1965, the year of his death.

After the war, he worked for the Sunao (素直) magazine, led by poet and social activist Shin'ichi Eguchi (1914–1979), in which Sakurajima and some of his short stories were published. Sakurajima established Umezaki as a representative of Japanese postwar literature alongside writers like Hiroshi Noma and Rinzō Shiina. The war theme later gave way to satirical stories like Boroya no shunjū, and still later to the examination of human anxiety in modern society.

Umezaki died of liver cirrhosis in Tokyo on 19 July 1965.

== Selected works ==
- Fūen (風宴), 1939.
- Sakurajima (桜島), 1946.
- Hi no hate (日の果て, End of the Sun), 1947.
- Kuroi hana (黒い花, Black Flower), 1950.
- Nise no kisetsu (Season of forgery), 1954.
- Boroya no shunjū (ボロ家の春秋, Shanty Life or Occurrences of an Old Dilapidated House), 1954.
- Suna dokei (砂時計, The Hourglass), 1955.
- Tsumujikaze (つむじ風), 1957.
- Kurui-dako (狂ひ凧), 1963.
- Genka (幻化, Illusions), 1965.

== Awards ==
- 1954: Naoki Prize for Boroya no shunjū
- 1955: Shinchō Award for Suna dokei
- 1963: Ministry of Education, Culture, Sports, Science and Technology Award for Kurui-dako
- 1965: Mainichi Publishing Culture Award for Genka (posthumously)

== Adaptations ==
Films

- 1954: Hi no hate, directed by Satsuo Yamamoto
- 1963: Tsumujikaze, directed by Noboru Nakamura
