= Rinzō Shiina =

Japanese writer (1911–1973)

- 椎名麟三
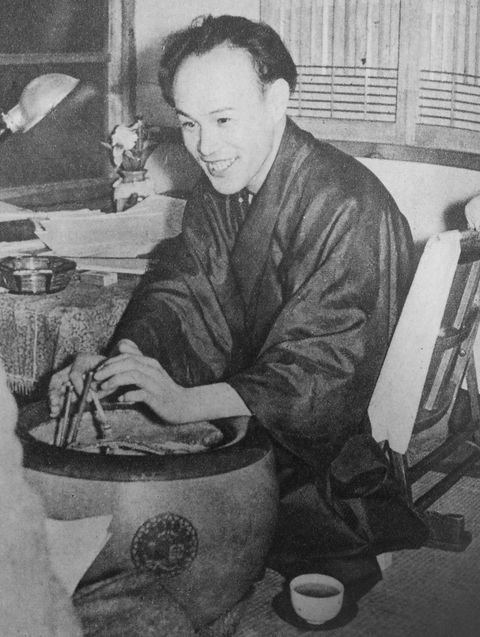
- Shiina Rinzō in 1948 (Asahi Shinbun)
- Born: Ōtsubo Noboru; 1 October 1911; Hyōgo Prefecture
- Died: 28 March 1973 (aged 61)
- Education: High school dropout
- Occupation: Novelist (Short story)
- Writing career
- Language: Japanese
- Genres: Romance, short story
- Subject: Christian
- Notable work: Utsukushii onna
- Notable awards: Agency for Cultural Affairs Arts Award (1955)

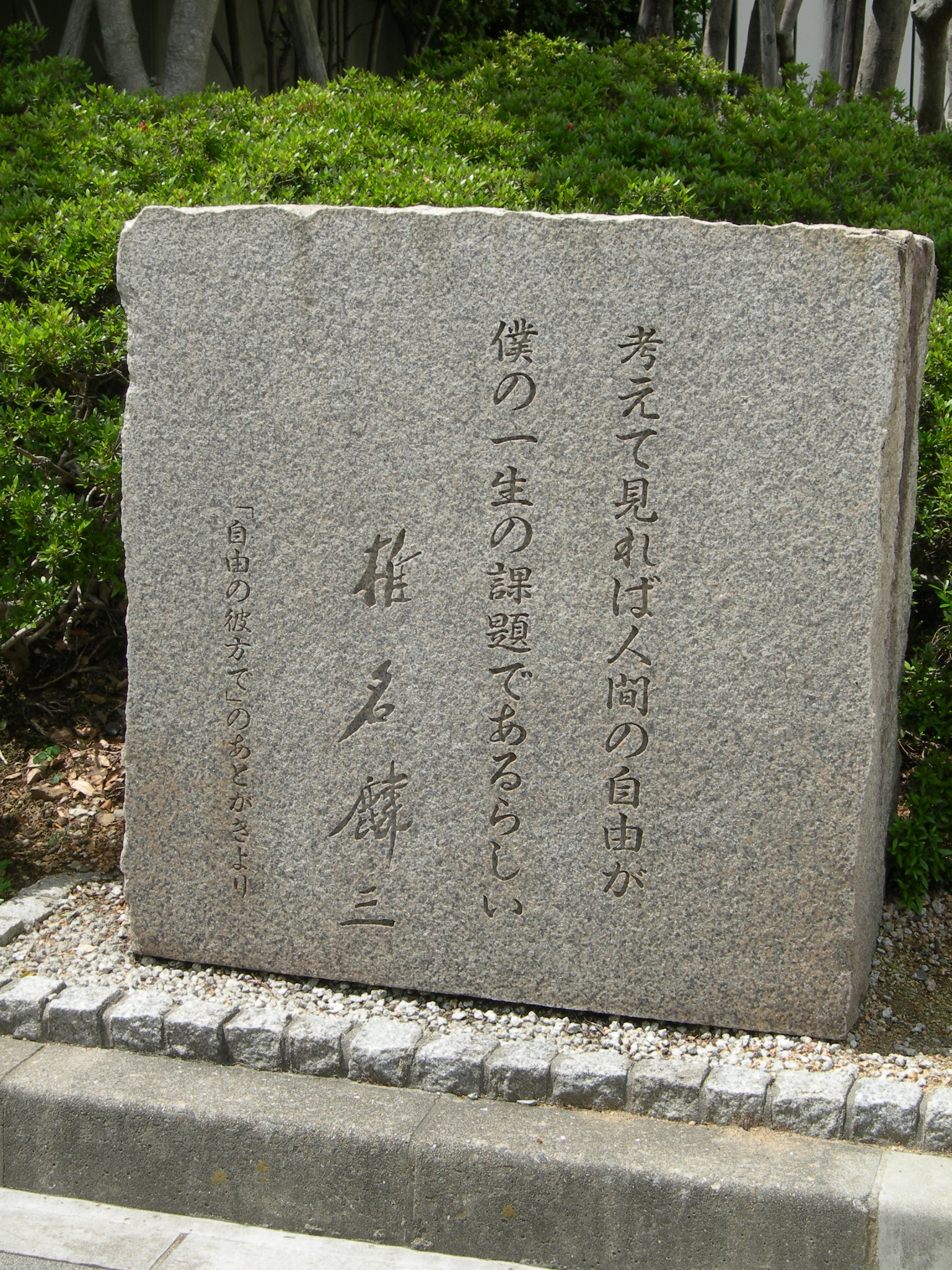
Granite marker in Hyōgo Prefecture honoring Rinzō Shiina

Rinzō Shiina (椎名 麟三 Shiina Rinzō; born 大坪 昇 Noboru Ōtsuka; 1 October 1911 – 28 March 1973) was a Japanese writer, novelist, short story writer and playwright.

Shiina's best known works were written after 1950. His writing focused on the spiritual poverty of post-occupation Japan.

== Selected works ==
In a statistical overview derived from writings by and about Rinzō Shiina, OCLC/WorldCat encompasses roughly 274 works in 433 publications in three languages and 1,530 library holdings.

- Eiennaru Joshō; Chōekinin no Kokuhatsu (永遠なる序章; 懲役人の告発), 1948
- Shiina Rinzō shū (椎名麟三集 by 椎名麟三), 1952
- Shiina Rinzō, Noma Hiroshi, Umezaki Haruo shū (椎名麟三, 野間宏, 梅崎春生集). 1954
- Ai no Shōgen (愛の証言), 1955; translated from the Japanese as The Flowers Are Fallen, 1961, by Sydney Giffard
- Shiina Rinzō, Umezaki Haruo shū (椎名麟三, 梅崎春生集), 1965
- The Go-Between and Other Stories by Rinzō Shiina, 1970; translated by Noah S. Brannen (ISBN 978-0-81700-490-3).
  - "Baishakunin" ("The Go-Between") also appears in ISBN 978-0-23113-804-8
