= Yao Kitabatake =

Japanese writer (1903–1982)

Kitabatake Yao
- 北畠 八穂
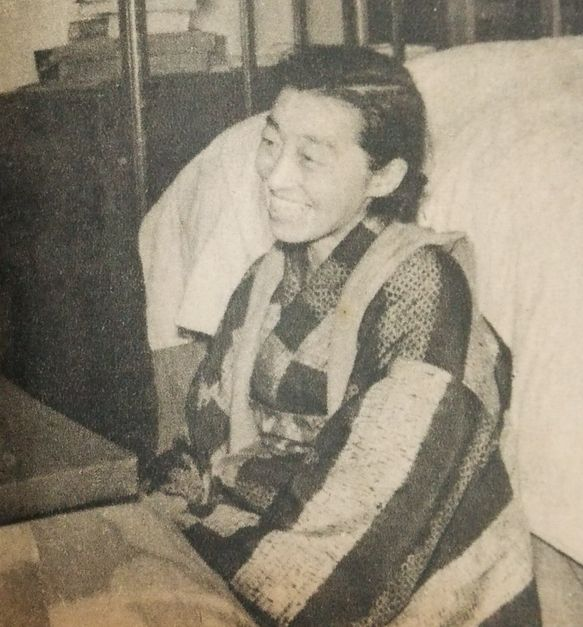
- Kitabatake Yao in 1948
- Born: 5 October 1903; Aomori, Aomori, Japan
- Died: 18 March 1982 (aged 78); Kamakura, Kanagawa, Japan
- Occupation: Writer
- Writing career
- Genres: novels, children's literature

Yao Kitabatake (北畠 八穂, Kitabatake Yao; 5 October 1903 – 18 March 1982) was a poet and children's literature writer in Shōwa period Japan.

== Early life ==
Kitabatake Yao was born in Aomori city, Aomori Prefecture as the sixth of ten children. She began writing in high school and won a number of awards for short articles submitted to women’s magazines. After her graduation from high school, she moved to Tokyo and attended the Jissen Women's University, but was forced to drop out due to illness (tuberculosis (spondylitis)) after around 18 months. She returned to Aomori and found employment as a substitute teacher in 1924, but continued to struggle with her sickness. In 1926, she published her initial works in the literary magazine Kaizō. Around this time, she also met fellow writer Fukada Kyūya, with whom she started to live as his common law wife.

With Fukada, she returned to Tokyo in 1929, living at first in Abiko, Chiba followed by Honjo. Although they were living together as husband and wife, Fukada never officially registered the marriage with the city office due to strong opposition from his family over Yao's weak health.

Yao continued to write, but as her writing was affected by her strong Tohoku accent and lack of higher education, she relied on Fukada to copy edit her works. Fukada had the works published under his own name, and soon was receiving fame and adulation as a brilliant new author, not to mention the royalties from the works. However, leading literary critics Kobayashi Hideo and Kawabata Yasunari eventually realized that Asunarao and Fukada's previous work Orokko no musume were not Fukada's works at all, but had been copy-edited or plagiarized from the writings of Kitabatake Yao. The scandal nearly ended Fukada's credibility as a writer.

In March 1940, Fukada formally married Kitabatake Yao. However, in May 1941, Fukada happened to be reunited with his first love, Koba Shigeko (the daughter of Nakamura Mitsuo) in a chance meeting, and by August 1942, Shigeko gave birth to his illegitimate child. Yao soon found out about the affair, and Fukada quickly enlisted in the Imperial Japanese Army rather than return home. Fukuda was then ordered to wartime China.

== Literary career ==
In 1947, Yao formally divorced Fukada. She had already published her first story for children in a magazine called Ginga ("Galaxy") in 1946. The story was about sensitive and resilient children suffering from the loss of their parents and siblings during the war. This was followed by Jiro Buchin Nikki which was first serialized in Ginga from January to December 1947 and then published in book form the next year by Shinchosha. It is a full-length story of Jiro and his younger sister (nicknamed Buchin) repatriated from Japan's South Seas Mandate, who have come to live in a village in the Tōhoku region of northern Japan. Although separated from their parents and elder brother, whom they missed very much, they are comforted and encouraged by kindly rural people surrounding them.

In 1948, Yao moved in with author and literary critic Shiroyanagi Yoshihiko (1921–1992) almost 20 years her junior. They lived together in Kamakura, Kanagawa until her death of jaundice at the age of 78.

== See also ==
- List of Japanese authors
