= Naoya Shiga =

Japanese short-story writer and essayist (1883–1971)

- 志賀直哉
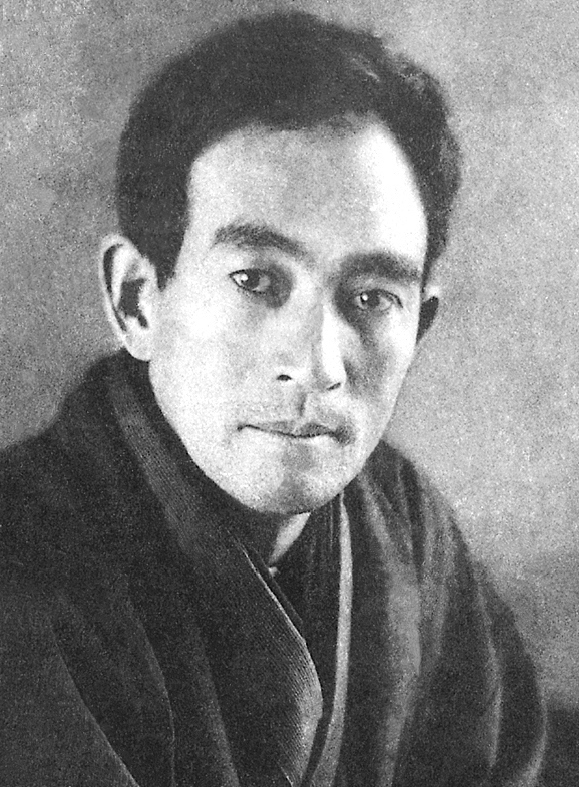
- Born: February 20, 1883; Ishinomaki-chō, Oshika-gun, Miyagi Prefecture, Empire of Japan
- Died: October 21, 1971 (aged 88); Kantō Central Public Hospital, Kamiyoga, Setagaya-ku, Tokyo, Japan
- Resting place: Aoyama Cemetery, Tokyo, Japan
- Occupation: Writer
- Writing career
- Language: Japanese
- Genre: I-novel

Naoya Shiga (志賀直哉, Shiga Naoya) Japanese pronunciation: [ɕì.ɡä́ | nä̀.ó̞.jä́, -ɡä́ nä́.ó̞.jä́, -ɡä́ (|) nä́.ò̞.jä̀, -ŋä́-], February 20, 1883 – October 21, 1971 was a Japanese writer active during the Taishō and Shōwa periods of Japan, whose work was distinguished by its lucid, straightforward style and strong autobiographical overtones.

== Early life ==
Shiga was born in Ishinomaki, Miyagi Prefecture, as the son of a banker and descendant of an aristocratic samurai family. In 1885, the family moved to Tokyo and Shiga was placed in his grandparents' custody. His mother died when he was twelve, an experience that marked the beginning of an obsession with and fear of death both on an individual and a collective level, and which stayed with him until his early thirties. At the same time, his relationship with his father became increasingly strained. One conflict resulted from Shiga's announcement that he intended to participate in the protests following the 1907 Ashio Copper Mine incident and his father's forbidding him to do so because part of the family's wealth was derived from a past investment in the mine.

Shiga's imagination was inspired by nature, and he was an avid reader of Thomas Carlyle and Ralph Waldo Emerson, as well as of Lafcadio Hearn's stories of the supernatural. At the age of 18, Shiga converted to Christianity under the influence of Uchimura Kanzō, but struggled with his new religion due to his own homosexual tendencies. He graduated from the Gakushuin Peer's Elementary School in 1906 and started studying English literature at Tokyo Imperial University, but left two years later without a degree. Another family crisis arose when Shiga announced to marry one of the housemaids, Chiyo, with whom he was having an affair. The father terminated his son's plans, and the maid was removed from the household.

== Literary career ==
In 1910, Shiga co-founded the magazine Shirakaba ("White birch"), the literary publication of the Shirakaba-ha ("White birch society"). Other co-founders included Saneatsu Mushanokōji and Rigen Kinoshita, who Shiga had befriended at Gakushuin Peer's School, and Takeo Arishima and Ton Satomi. The Shirakaba-ha rejected Confucianism and Naturalism, and instead propagated individualism, idealism and humanitarianism, for which Russian writer Leo Tolstoy served as a model. Shiga contributed the story As Far as Abashiri (Abashiri made) to the first issue.

In the following years, Shiga published short stories like The Razor (Kamisori, 1910), Han's Crime (Han no hanzai, 1913) and Seibei and his Gourds (Seibei to hyotan, 1913). The story Ōtsu Junkichi, published in Chūō Kōron in 1912, his first publication for which he received a fee, was an autobiographical account of his affair with the former housemaid Chiyo and the familial conflicts. It also marked the first time that Shiga drew on the method of a narrating self, a distinctive mark of the I-novel genre, to which many of Shiga's works are ascribed. While working on Ōtsu Junkichi, Shiga had read the English translation of Anatole France's novel The Crime of Sylvestre Bonnard, which he cited as an important influence on his own writing.

In 1914, Shiga married Sada Kadenokōji, a widow with a six-year-old daughter (and a cousin of Mushanokōji), which led to a complete break between father and son. However, 1917 saw the reconciliation with his father, which he thematised in his novella Reconciliation (Wakai, 1917). He followed with a series of short stories and A Dark Night's Passing (An'ya koro, 1921–1937); the latter, his only full length novel, was serialized in the socialist magazine Kaizō and is regarded as his major work. The novel's protagonist, young struggling writer Kensaku, has often been associated with its author. Shiga's sometimes confessional stories also included a series of accounts of his extramarital affair in the mid-1920s, among them A Memory of Yamashina (Yamashina no kioku, 1926), Infatuation (Chijo, 1926) and Kuniko (1927).

Shiga's work influenced many later writers, including Kazu Ozaki, Kiku Amino, Motojirō Kajii, Takiji Kobayashi, Fumio Niwa, Kōsaku Takii, Kiyoshi Naoi, Toshimasa Shimamura, Hiroyuki Agawa and Shizuo Fujieda. While his work was praised by Ryūnosuke Akutagawa and Sei Itō, other contemporaries like Dazai Osamu, Mitsuo Nakamura and Sakunosuke Oda were strongly critical of it. Jun'ichirō Tanizaki praised the "practicality" (jitsuyō) of Shiga's style, in which he discovered, with reference to At Kinosaki, a "tightening up" (higishimeta) of the sentences: "[…] any word that is not absolutely necessary has been left out".

Shiga was also known for being a harsh moral critic of the literary establishment, blaming Tōson Shimazaki for having written his debut novel The Broken Commandment under such precarious financial hardship that Shimazaki's three young daughters died of malnutrition.

== Later life ==
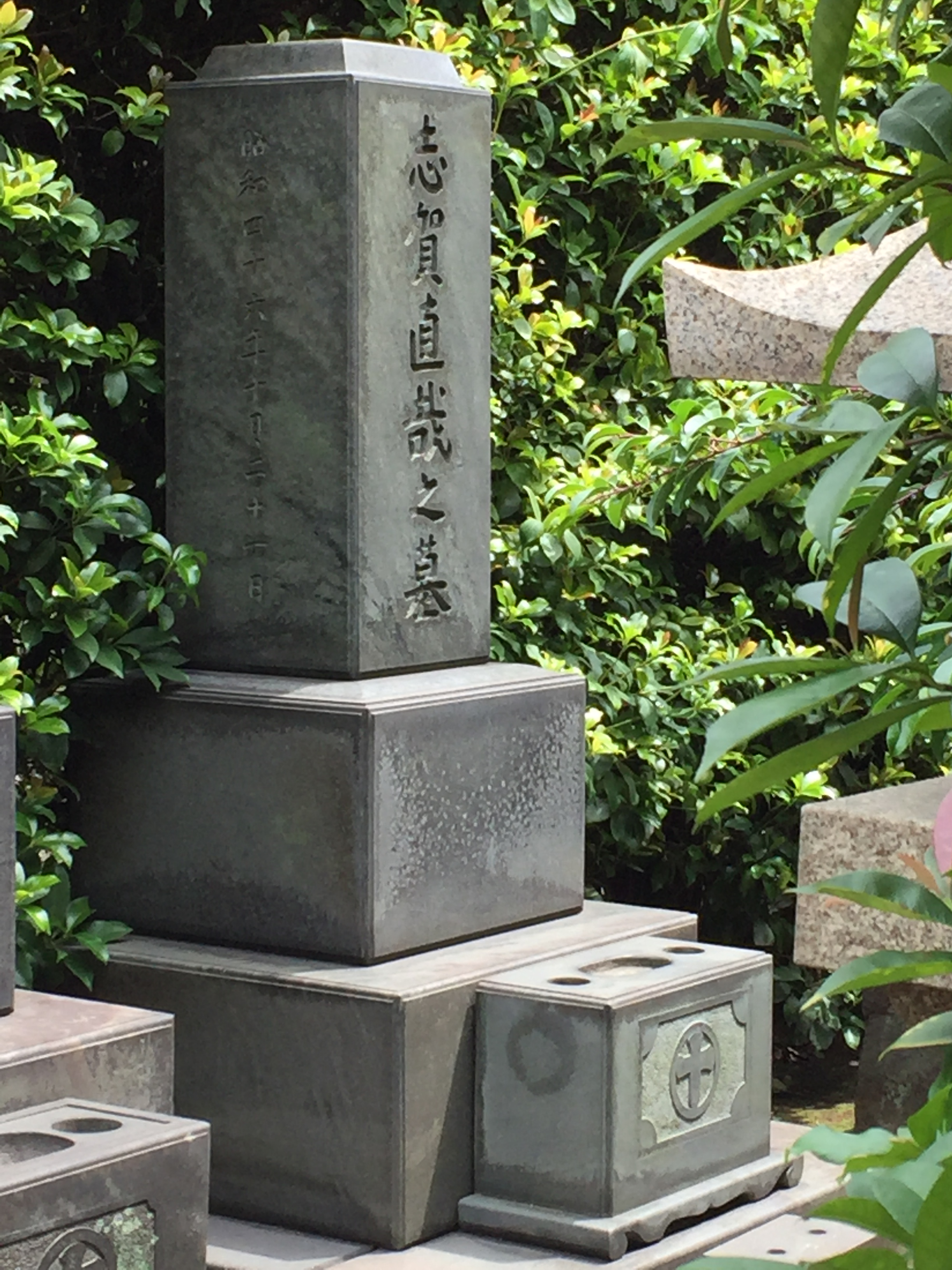
Gravestone of Naoya Shiga

Shiga published very few new works in his later years. These included the short stories A Gray Moon (Haiiro no tsuki, 1946) and Yamabato (1951), or essays like Kokuko mondai (1946), in which he proposed to make French the national language of Japan. He served as the first post-war president of the Japan PEN Club from 1947 to 1948, and was awarded the Order of Culture in 1949. He died of pneumonia on October 21, 1971, at Kantō Central Public Hospital in Setagaya, Tokyo. His grave is at Aoyama Cemetery in Tokyo. His house in Nara, where he lived from 1929 to 1938, has been preserved and is open to the public as a memorial museum.

== Selected works ==
- 1910: As Far as Abashiri (Abashiri made)
- 1910: The Razor (Kamisori)
- 1911: Nigotta atama
- 1912: Ōtsu Junkichi
- 1913: Han's Crime (Han no hanzai)
- 1913: Seibei and his Gourds (Seibei to hyotan)
- 1917: At Kinosaki (Kinosaki ni te)
- 1917: The Case of Sasaki (Sasaki no baai)
- 1917: Reconciliation (Wakai)
- 1917: Kōjinbutsu no fūfu
- 1920: The Shopboy's God (Kozō no kamisama)
- 1920: Manazuru
- 1920: Bonfire (Takibi)
- 1921–1937: A Dark Night's Passing (An'ya koro)
- 1926: A Memory of Yamashina (Yamashina no kioku)
- 1926: Infatuation (Chijo)
- 1927: Kuniko
- 1946: A Gray Moon (Haiiro no tsuki)

== Translations (selected) ==
- A Dark Night's Passing. Translated by McClellan, Edwin. Tokyo: Kodansha International Ltd. 1976. ISBN 9780870113628.
- The Paper Door and Other Stories by Shiga Naoya. Translated by Dunlop, Lane. San Francisco: North Point. 1987. ISBN 9780865472600.
- Starrs, Roy (2013). An Artless Art – The Zen Aesthetic of Shiga Naoya: A Critical Study with Selected Translations. London and New York: Routledge. ISBN 9781134247264.
