= Kyūya Fukada =

Japanese writer and mountaineer

- 深田 久弥
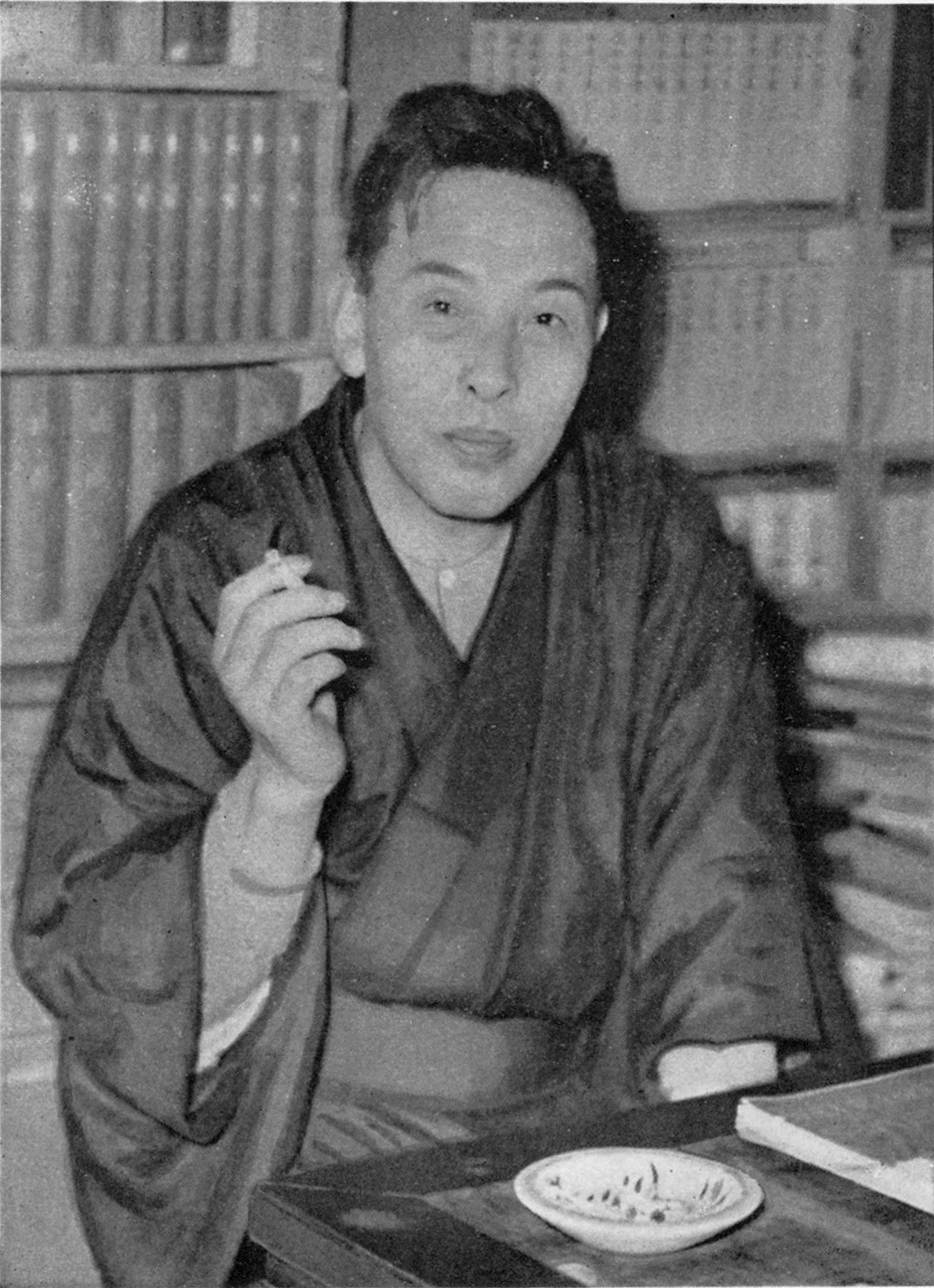
- Fukada c. 1954
- Born: 11 March 1903; Kaga, Ishikawa, Japan
- Died: 21 March 1971 (aged 67); Mount Kayagadake (茅ヶ岳), Yamanashi, Japan
- Occupation: Writer
- Writing career
- Genre: non-fiction

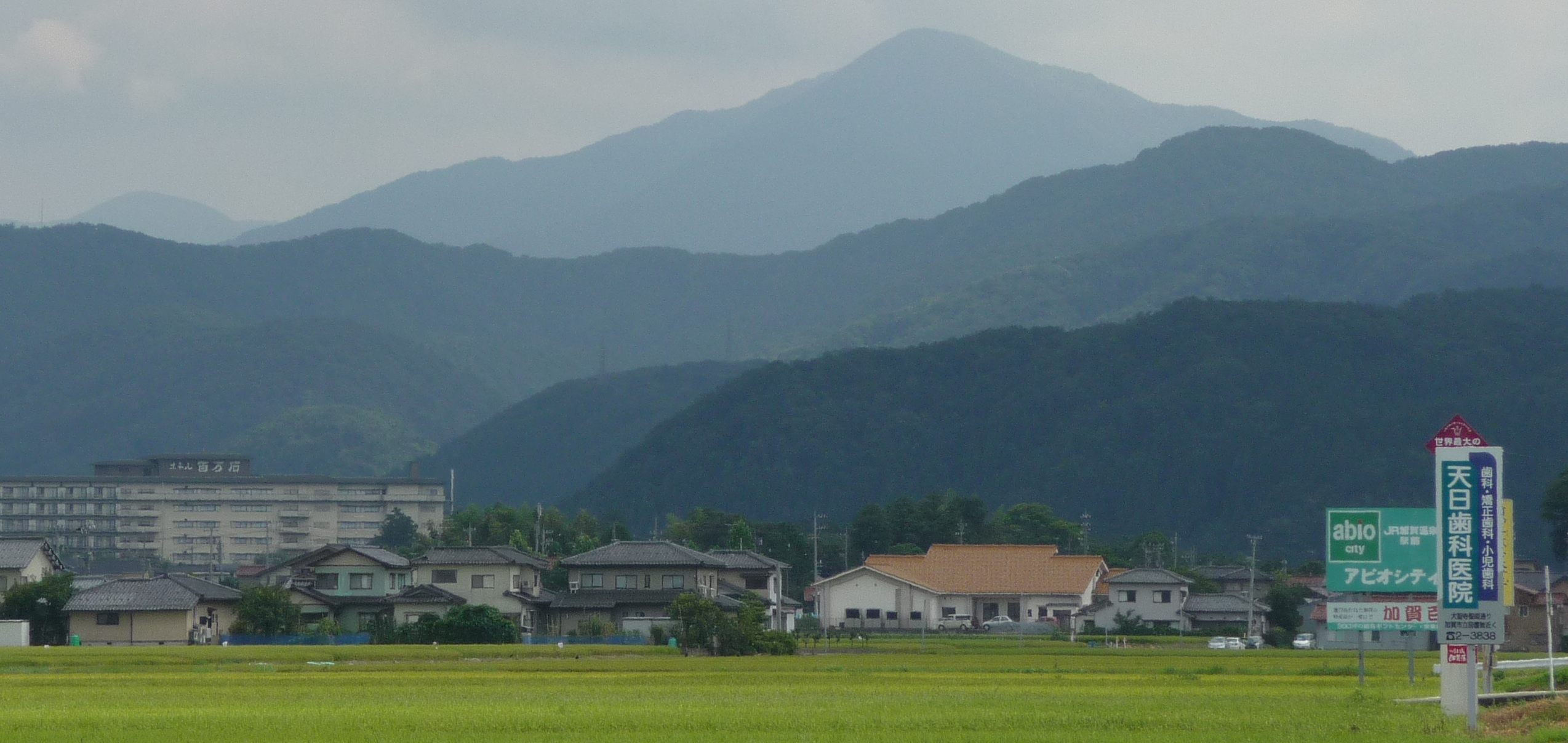
Mount Fujishagadake (富士写ヶ岳, Fujishagadake) (942 metres), which Kyūya climbed during a school excursion at 12 years old. This led to his attraction for mountain climbing. (Kaga, Ishikawa)

Kyūya Fukada (深田 久弥, Fukada Kyūya; 11 March 1903 – 21 March 1971) was a Japanese writer and mountaineer active during the Shōwa period in Japan.

== Early life ==
Kyūya was born in what is now Kaga city, Ishikawa prefecture. He attended the Fujishima High School, followed by the preparatory school for the Tokyo Imperial University, where he studied literature. During this time, he became friends with Hori Tatsuo and Takami Jun. He also joined the school's mountaineering club, and took the pen-name of Kyusan (literally Nine Mountains) as his haiku pseudonym.

While a student at Tokyo University, he began writing short stories, and he also fell in love with the poet Kitabatake Yao. Shortly after they started living together, he published his first work. Orokko no musume. The work was well received by critics, emboldening him enough to quit school in 1930 and to devote his energies to writing.

== Literary career ==
In 1932, Fukada published his next work, Asunarao. However, leading literary critics Kobayashi Hideo and Kawabata Yasunari soon realized that Asunarao and his previous work Orokko no musume were not Fukada's works at all, but had been copy-edited (or to put it less charitably, plagiarized) from the writings of Kitabatake Yao.

In March 1940, Fukada formally married Kitabatake Yao. However, in May 1941, Fukada happened to be reunited with his first love, Koba Shigeko (the sister of Nakamura Mitsuo) in a chance meeting, and by August 1942, Shigeko gave birth to his illegitimate child. His wife soon found out about the affair, and Fukada quickly enlisted in the Imperial Japanese Army, asking for an immediate transfer to the front lines war-time China to avoid the potentially more dangerous conflict at home; he served for the next three years in front-line combat units from Qingdao to Nanjing.

At the end of the war, Fukada was demobilized, and returned to Japan in 1946, but he avoided a reunion with his wife and went back to Shigeko, whom he married as soon as his divorce was finalized. However, Fukada and his new wife were forced to live in poverty over ten years, as his former wife made sure that the earlier issue of his “copy edited” versions of her works was remembered by publishers. Partly due to the stigma he was unable to publish any works for over 10 years.

Fukada was reconciled with fellow mountaineer Kobayashi Hideo, who encouraged him to write non-fiction works about mountains and mountaineering. From 1959 to 1963, he wrote Nihon Hyakumeizan (100 Famous Japanese Mountains), which was an immediate hit, and which won the 16th Yomiuri Prize. In 1968, Fukada was made vice-chairman of the Japan Mountaineering Association. In 1966, and again in 1969–1970, he made long journeys in Central Asia of China and the Soviet Union, exploring the mountains of the Silk Road.

Fukada died in March 1971 of a stroke near the summit of Mount Kayagatake (1704 m) in Yamanashi prefecture. His grave is at the temple of Honko-ji in Daishoji-machi, Kaga city, Ishikawa prefecture.

Fukada was honored by the Japanese government with a commemorative postage stamp issued on 1 July 2003.

== See also ==
- Japanese literature
- List of Japanese authors
- 100 Famous Japanese Mountains
