= Onuma =

Onuma, Ōnuma or Oonuma may refer to:

- Onuma (surname), Japanese surname
- Ōnuma District, district of Fukushima Prefecture, Japan
- Ōnuma Station, train station in Hokkaido Prefecture, Japan
- Ōnuma Quasi-National Park, national park in Hokkaido Prefecture, Japan, with a famous pond also called Ōnuma

== People with the given name ==
- Onuma Sittirak (born 1986), Thai volleyball player
