= Sei Kazoku =

1930 short story by Tatsuo Hori

- Author: Tatsuo Hori
- Original title: 聖家族
- Language: Japanese
- Genre: Modernism
- Publisher: Kaizō (magazine)
- Publication date: 1930
- Publication place: Japan
- Media type: Print

Sei Kazoku (聖家族; lit. The Holy Family) is a short story by Japanese writer Tatsuo Hori first published in 1930. It was the first work for which Hori received recognition, and is regarded as an early important example of Modernist Japanese literature.

== Plot ==
At the funeral service for Mr. Kuki, Kuki's twenty-year-old disciple Henri Kono meets widow Mrs. Saiki, with whom Kuki had a passionate love affair. Some time later, Mrs. Saiki invites Henri to her home and introduces him to her daughter Kinuko. Mrs. Saiki tells him that Kinuko discovered a book on the paintings of Raphael in a used book store, which had been in Kuki's possession. Henri admits that he had once received it as a gift from his mentor, but had to sell it due to his tight financial situation. Mrs. Saiki sends him money to buy the book back, and during his following visits, Henri and Kinuko begin to develop an affection for each other. Yet, they are not only unable to communicate their feelings, Henri doesn't even recognise that Kinuko is the reason for his emotional confusion, and seeks distraction in an affair with a revue dancer. Kinuko learns of Henri's affair, but sublimates her jealousy.

One day Henri shows up at the Saikis' home to announce that he will leave town for a while. Kinuko falls ill afterwards and realises that she is in love with him. At his new home in a small town by a lake, Henri realises that Kiku's shadow still haunts him. He sends a postcard to the Saikis, which not only reveals to Mrs. Saiki how much Henri is obsessed with his dead mentor, but also awakens in her the sensation that she has fallen in love with Henri like her daughter has. Kinuko, who had felt estranged from her mother, starts feeling closer to her again.

== Publication and background ==
Sei Kazoku first appeared in Kaizō magazine in 1930 and was published in book form in 1932. It was written under the impression of the early death of writer Ryūnosuke Akutagawa, whom Hori regarded as his mentor, and even paid reference to Akutagawa in the shape of the deceased character Kuki. The story also shows the influence of Raymond Radiguet, whom Hori had read and translated in his student years. The title refers to Raphael's painting of the same name. (Note: Hori refers both to the Canigiani family painting and a variant on which the Holy Child looks directly at Maria.)

Sei kazoku has been reprinted in Japan numerous times after the war. It has not seen an English translation and publication yet. A translation into German by Kakuji Watanabe appeared in 1960.

== Bibliography ==
- Hori, Tatsuo (1981). 堀辰雄集 (Hori Tatsuo Collected Works) (in Japanese). Tokyo: Shinchosha.
