= Ken'ichi Yoshida (literary scholar) =

Japanese literary scholar

- 吉田 健一
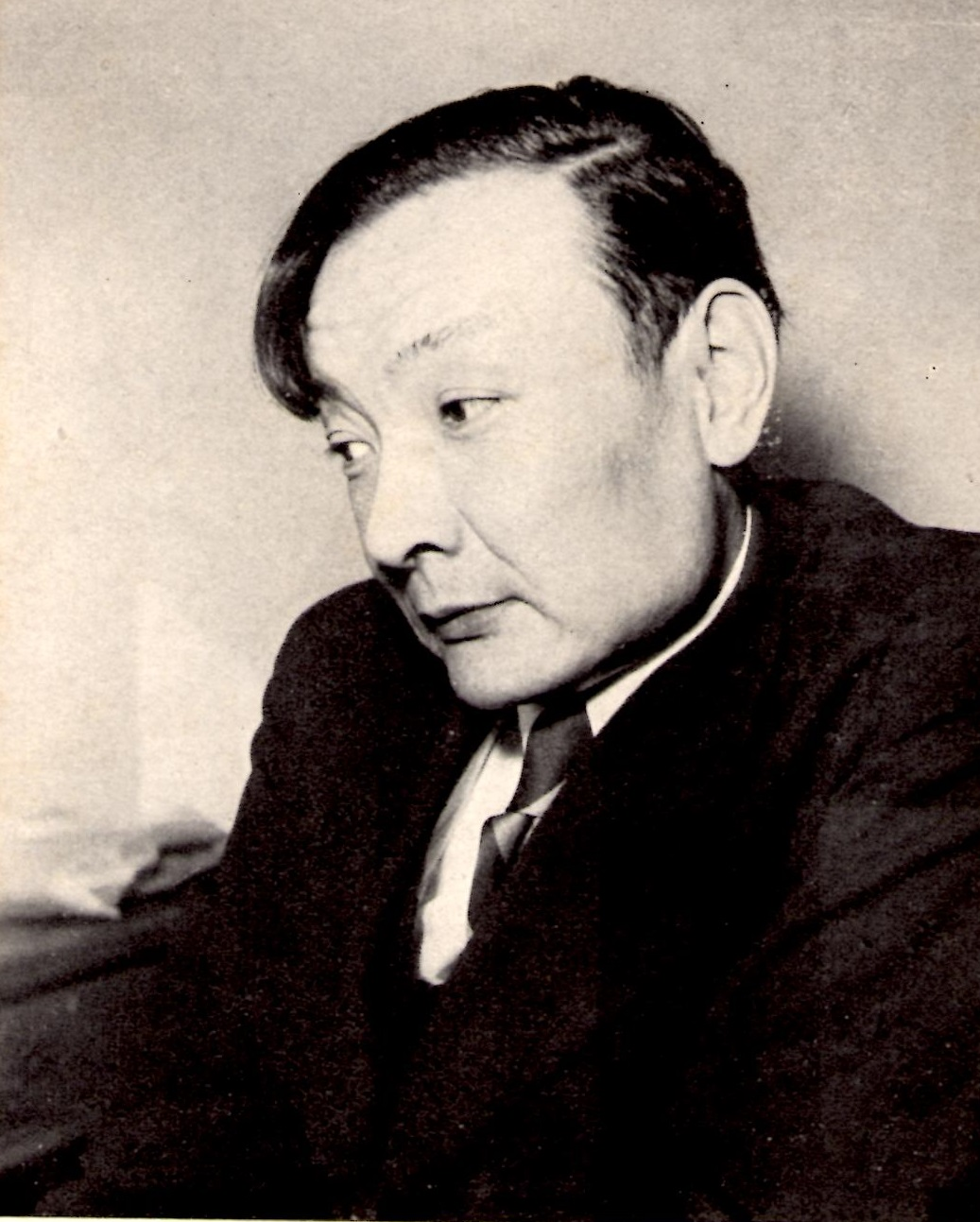
- Ken'ichi Yoshida in 1951
- Born: 1 April 1912; Tokyo, Japan
- Died: 3 August 1977 (aged 65); Yokohama, Japan
- Resting place: Kuboyama Reien, Yokohama
- Education: University of Cambridge
- Occupation: Writer
- Parent(s): Shigeru Yoshida (father); Yukiko Makino (mother)
- Relatives: Tarō Asō (nephew); Princess Tomohito of Mikasa (niece)
- Writing career
- Genres: Novels, English literature translations
- Notable awards: Yomiuri Prize (1957 and 1971); Noma Literary Prize (1970)

Ken'ichi Yoshida (吉田 健一, Yoshida Ken'ichi; 1 April 1912 – 3 August 1977) was a Japanese author and literary critic in Shōwa period Japan.

== Early life ==
Yoshida was born in Tokyo as the eldest son of future Prime Minister of Japan Shigeru Yoshida, who at the time was a Japanese diplomat in Rome. His mother Yukiko, a daughter of Count Makino Nobuaki, left Tokyo soon after Ken'ichi's birth to join her husband, so he was raised at the Makino household during the first few years of his life. He started living with his parents at the age of six, when his father was posted to Qingdao, China. Thereafter he lived in Paris, London, and Tianjin (where he studied at a school for British children) before moving back to Tokyo where he graduated from secondary school. In October 1930 he enrolled at King's College, Cambridge, where he was interested in the works of William Shakespeare, Charles Baudelaire, and Jules Laforgue. He became a student of Goldsworthy Dickinson, but dropped out and went back to Tokyo in February 1931, on Dickinson's advice that in order to devote his life to literature he should live in Japan. During the next few years he studied French at the Athénée Français in Kanda, Tokyo.

== Literary career ==
Yoshida's début as a writer was in 1935 with a translation of Edgar Allan Poe's Memorandum (Oboegaki). Over the next several years, he translated a number of works of French literature into Japanese. His debut into literary criticism was an article on the works of Laforgue, published in Bungakukai in January 1939. In 1939, together with Nakamura Mitsuo and Yamamoto Kenkichi, Yoshida co-founded the literary magazine Hihyō (批評) (literally, "Critique(s)"), which published critiques of modern French and British authors.

He was drafted into the Imperial Japanese Navy in May 1945 and assigned to the naval infantry brigade at Yokosuka Naval District, but was never posted to combat. In April 1949, he became a part-time lecturer at the Kōkagakuin. He was a professor of literature at Chuo University from April 1963 to March 1969.

Yoshida's output was prolific in the early post-war period, with works ranging from translations of Charles Baudelaire and English literature, ranging from Shakespeare to fiction (including Lady Chatterley's Lover), with short stories and novels. He also published lighter works such as Saishō Onzōshi Hinkyusu (宰相御曹司貧窮す, "Prime Minister's Eldest Son Suffers Dire Poverty"): this was titled by its publisher against his wishes, so he also published a private edition of the same work under the title Detarameron (出鱈目論, "On Hogwash"). He also contributed a column to the Asahi Shimbun, in which he introduced English slang, such as “One for the road”, and “Hair of the dog” to the Japanese public. Noted as an eccentric, Yoshida was often at odds with his politician father. On occasion, after an argument which had resulted in the termination of his financial stipend from his father, he would sit outside the International Press Club in Tokyo with an upturned hat and a sign reading “Prime Minister’s son – penniless” in hopes of generating enough embarrassment to his father that his offenses would be forgiven.

Yoshida lived in Kamakura, Kanagawa between 1946 and 1953 and maintained a long correspondence with various Kamakura literati, including Ishikawa Jun, Ōoka Shōhei, Kobayashi Hideo, Mishima Yukio, and Nakamura Mitsuo. He was awarded the Yomiuri Prize in 1957 and 1971 and the Noma Literary Prize in 1970.

Yoshida died in his home in Tokyo in 1977, shortly after returning from a trip to Europe, at 65; his grave is in the Kuboyama Reien cemetery in Yokohama.
