= Satarō Satō =

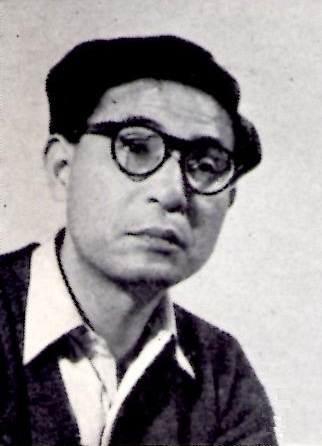

Satarō Satō (佐藤 佐太郎 Satō Satarō; 13 November 1909 – 8 August 1987) was a Japanese tanka poet. Before World War II, he studied under the great tanka poet Mokichi Saitō and published in the important literary magazine Araragi. He later became recognized as one of the first important postwar tanka poets, participating in the annual poetry gathering at the Tokyo Imperial Palace, the Utakai Hajime, and helping to found the Modern Tanka Poets' Association. He was also an accomplished essayist, critic and calligrapher.

== Biography ==
Satarō Satō was born on 13 November 1909. He was born in the Ōaza-Fukuta (大字福田) area of Ōgawara Town, Shibata District, Miyagi Prefecture, and lived for a time in Hiragata Town, Taga District (modern-day Kitaibaraki City), Ibaraki Prefecture.

He got a job at the Iwanami Publishing Company in 1925.

He joined the tanka poetry society Araragi in 1926. He considered himself to be a faithful disciple of Mokichi Saitō, one of the founders of the modern tanka. He first gained widespread recognition in 1940 with his tanka anthology Hodō (歩道, "Pavement"). Historian and critic Donald Keene noted of this collection that it "described ordinary scenes from the daily life of the middle class, but with a sharpness of perception and a care with words that distinguished [Satō]."

He was working at Iwanami during World War II, but after the end of the war he gave up this job to devote himself to the creation of poetry, bringing him greater fame. Keene noted that he was "[o]ne of the first tanka poets to emerge after the war". In 1952 he received the 3rd Yomiuri Prize.

He participated in the Utakai Hajime at the Tokyo Imperial Palace, and was one of the founding members of the Modern Tanka Poets' Association (現代歌人協会 Gendai Kajin Kyōkai). His collected poems, Satō Satarō Zenkashū (佐藤佐太郎全歌集), received the first Modern Tanka Prize (現代短歌大賞 gendai tanka taishō). He also wrote works of criticism and zuihitsu (essays), and was an accomplished calligrapher.

He died on 8 August 1987.

== Works cited ==
- Keene, Donald (1999) [1984]. A History of Japanese Literature, Vol. 4: Dawn to the West – Japanese Literature of the Modern Era (Poetry, Drama, Criticism) (paperback ed.). New York, NY: Columbia University Press. ISBN 978-0-231-11435-6.
- "Satō Satarō" 佐藤 佐太郎. 20-Seiki Nihon Jinmei Jiten (in Japanese). Nichigai Associates. 2004.
