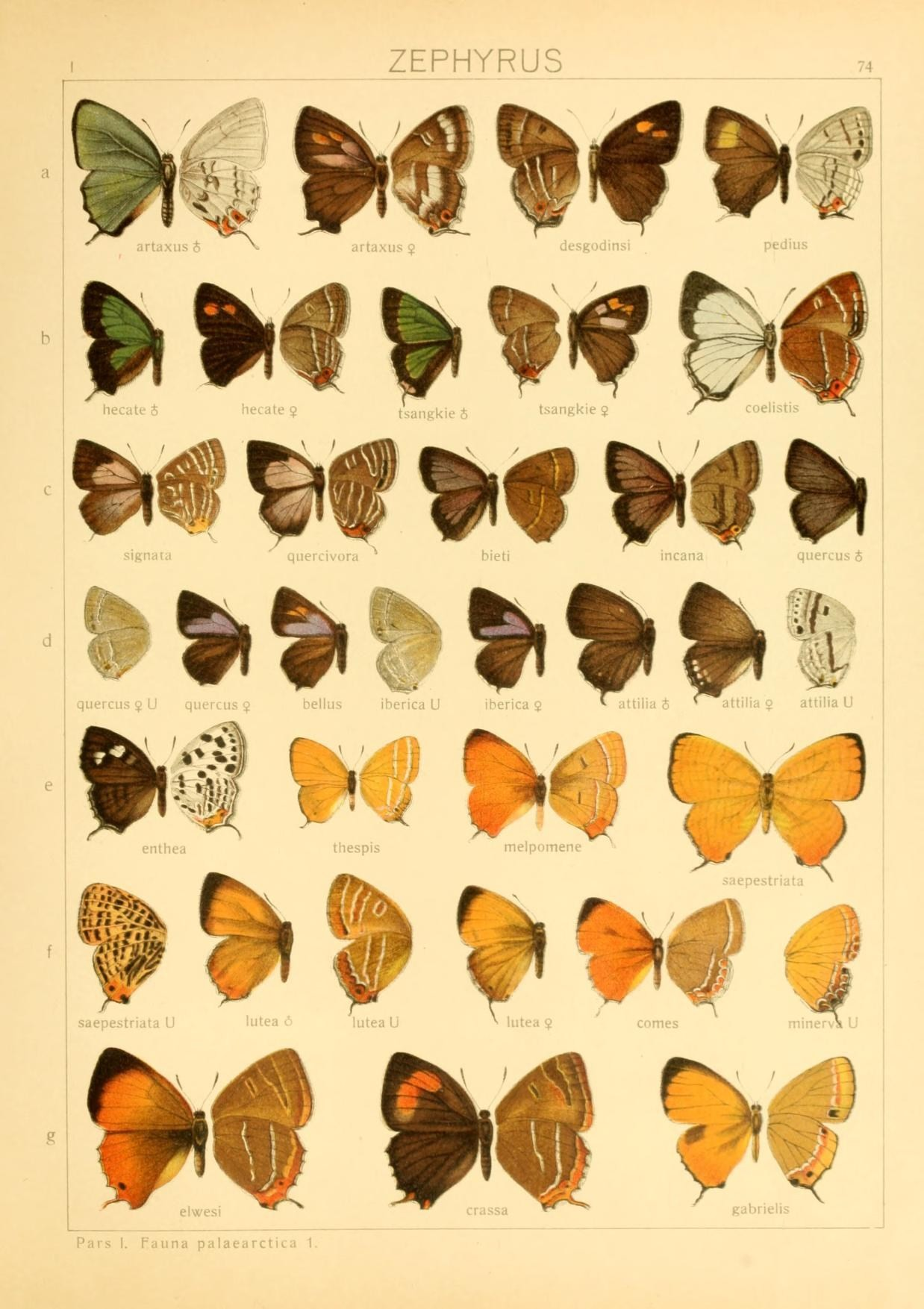
- Araragi enthea in Seitz

Scientific classification
- Domain: Eukaryota
- Kingdom: Animalia
- Phylum: Arthropoda
- Class: Insecta
- Order: Lepidoptera
- Family: Lycaenidae
- Genus: Araragi
- Species: A. enthea

Binomial name
- Araragi enthea (Janson, 1877)

= Araragi enthea =

Species of butterfly

Araragi enthea is a small butterfly found in the East Palearctic that belongs to the lycaenids or blues family.

== Description from Seitz ==
Z. enthea Jans. (74 e). Above dark black-brown, beyond the cell two pale spots in Japanese specimens, and two white ones in (Chinese individuals). Underside whitish, with smaller and larger, partly seriated [To arrange in serial order], dark spots, the anal area of the hindwing being orange. — Widely distributed, from West China to Amurland and Japan. Larva according to Graeser uniformly pale green, until July on Juglans mandschurica. The butterfly in July and August, plentiful in certain places.

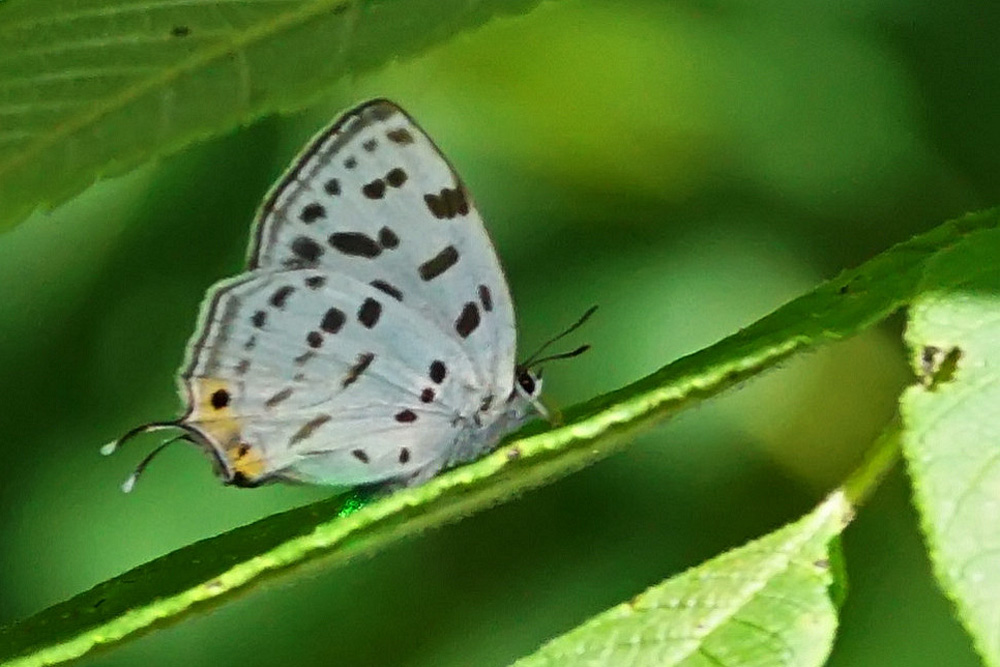
Araragi enthea morisonensis

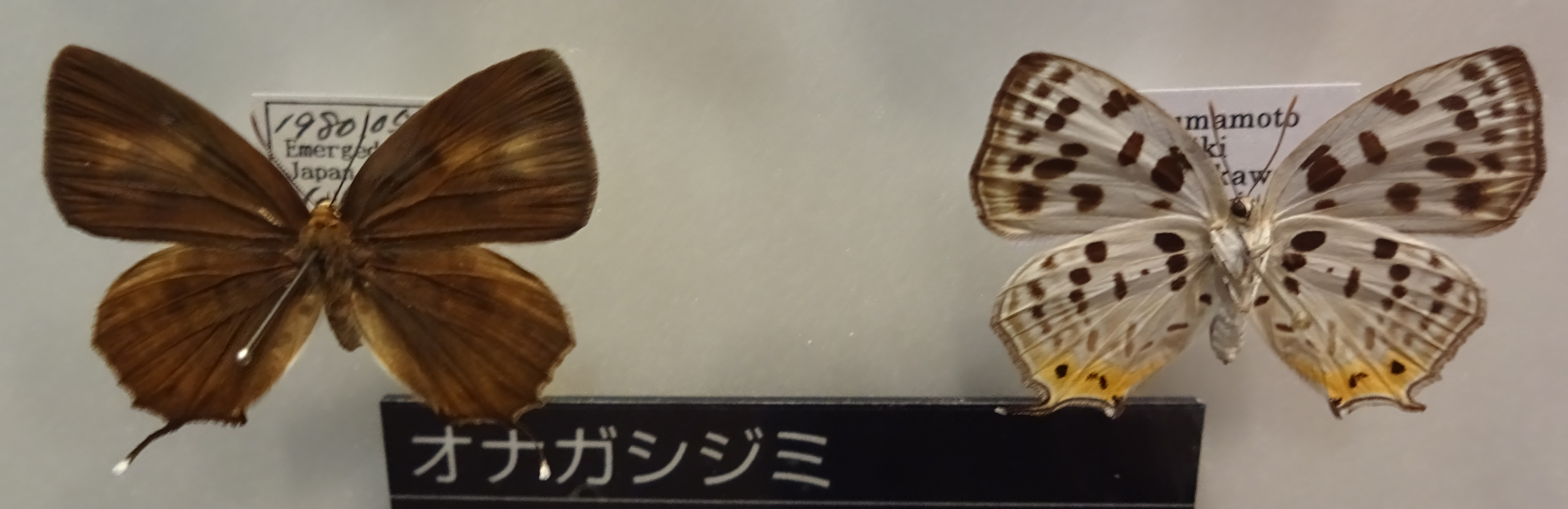

== See also ==
- List of butterflies of Russia
