= Onuma (surname) =

Onuma, Ōnuma or Oonuma (written: 大沼 lit. "big swamp", おおぬま in hiragana) is a Japanese surname. Notable people with the surname include:

- Ayako Ōnuma (大沼 綾子, born 1979), Japanese volleyball player
- Koji Onuma (大沼 幸二, born 1979), Japanese baseball player
- Shin Ōnuma (大沼 心), Japanese animation and theatre director

Onuma (written: 小沼 lit. "small swamp", おぬま in hiragana) is a separate Japanese surname, though both may be transliterated the same way. Notable people with the surname include:

- Tan Onuma (小沼 丹, 1918–1996), Japanese writer
