= The Wind Has Risen =

1936–38 Tatsuo Hori novel

- Author: Tatsuo Hori
- Original title: 風立ちぬ; Kaze tachinu
- Translator: Ineko Sato (1947); Eiichi Hayashi (1956); Mikio Kawamura (1967); Francis B. Tenny (2007)
- Language: Japanese
- Publisher: Kaizō (magazine); Bungei Shunjū (magazine); Shinjoen (magazine); Shinchō (magazine); Noda Shobo (book)
- Publication date: 1936–38
- Publication place: Japan
- English publication date: 1947, 1956, 1967, 2007
- Media type: Print

The Wind Has Risen (風立ちぬ, Kaze tachinu) is a Japanese novel by Tatsuo Hori, published between 1936 and 1938, and is regarded as his most acknowledged work. The story is set in a sanitarium in Nagano, Japan, where the nameless protagonist resides with his fiancée Setsuko, who has been diagnosed with tuberculosis.

== Plot ==
The story is divided into a prologue and four chapters:

Prologue

The first person narrator cites from Paul Valéry's poem Le Cimetière marin ("The wind has risen; we must try to live") when a strong wind occurs, while Setsuko, a woman he has just met this summer and who resides at the same hotel, is working on a painting. Setsuko announces that her father will soon arrive at the hotel, which will put an end to their walks. After Setsuko's and her father's departure, he returns to his work as a writer which he had abandoned during the time he had spent with her. Autumn has set in, and the protagonist muses how this encounter has changed him.

Spring

Two years later, the protagonist visits Setsuko, to whom he has become engaged in the meantime, and her father in their suburb home. Her studio has been turned into a sickroom, as Setsuko has fallen ill with tuberculosis. The father has contemplated the idea of sending her to a sanitarium, and is glad when his future son-in-law offers to accompany his daughter. Setsuko, who had felt weak lately, tells her fiancé that thanks to him her will to live has returned. Her words remind him of the line from Valéry's poem. Later, the sanitarium's director, who happens to be an acquaintance of the narrator, examines Setsuko and declares that a stay of one to two years will most likely cure her. Yet in a conversation between the director and the protagonist, it is implied that her condition is far more serious. At the end of the chapter, he and Setsuko take off for the sanitarium.

The Wind Has Risen

The narrator and Setsuko have taken their room in the sanitarium, where he learns from the director that she is the second worst case in the hospital. Despite her serious condition, he and Setsuko spend a time of mutual happiness. The most severe case, who resides in a room with the number 17, later dies, and another patient commits suicide. After a visit from Setsuko's father, who can't see any progress in her health, her condition deteriorates, but she later recovers. Encouraged by Setsuko, the protagonist announces to write a novel and make her the main character. Despite their affection, the two have an argument which reveals their tensions.

Winter

Still working on his novel, for which he has no ending, as he even admits in Setsuko's presence, the narrator takes long walks through the landscape. Setsuko's condition worsens, and she is assigned a practical nurse who looks after her, while he moves into a room next door. One evening, Setsuko imagines seeing her father's face in the shadows of the mountains.

In the Valley of the Shadow of Death

One year later, the protagonist, who now refers to himself as a "widower", moves into a hut outside of the village where he and Setsuko first met three years ago. He recalls Setsuko's last moments one year ago and sometimes feels like she were with him in the hut. He has conversations with a foreign Christian priest, whose service he attends although he does not consider himself a believer, and reads in Rainer Maria Rilke's Requiem. Late one night, he looks down into the valley, listening to the wind and the rustling sound of leaves, realising that, despite his loss and deliberate isolation, he has found a kind of happiness.

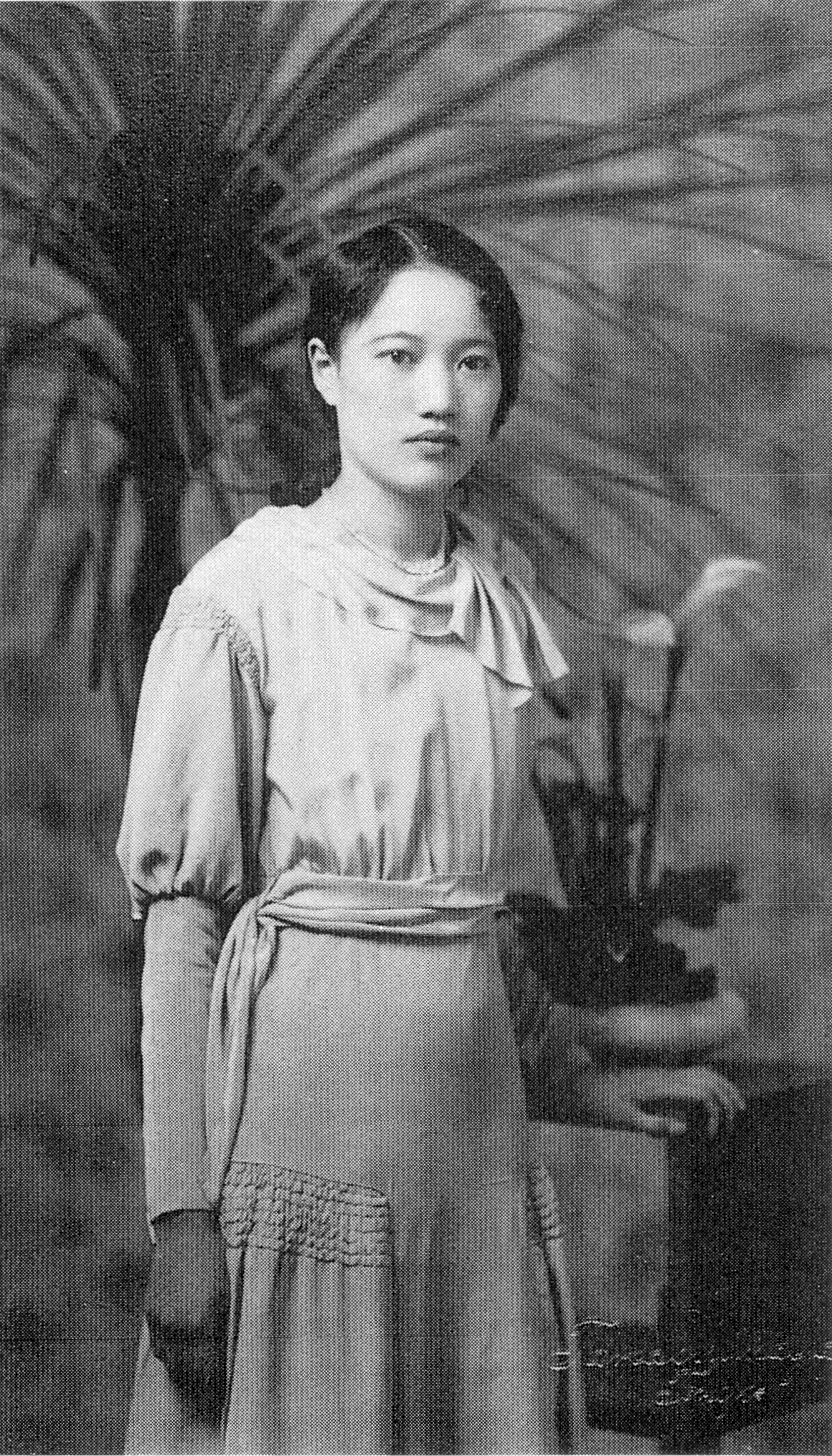
Ayako Yano, after whom the character of Setsuko was modeled

== Background ==
The Wind Has Risen first appeared in separate chapters, published in different literary magazines, including Kaizō and Bungei Shunjū, between 1936 and 1938. In 1938, it also appeared in book form, published by Noda Shobo. The novel was reprinted numerous times in later years, sometimes in conjunction with Hori's novella Beautiful Village (Utsukushii mura, 1933–34).

The title is derived from Paul Valéry's poem Le Cimetière marin, which the protagonist recites in the prologue. The last chapter quotes from Rilke's poem Requiem für eine Freundin ("Requiem for a female friend").

The character of Setsuko was modeled after Hori's fiancée Ayako Yano, who died of tuberculosis. Yano had previously appeared in fictionalised form in Beautiful Village.

== Translations ==
The Wind Has Risen appeared in English translation under the same title in 1947, translated by Ineko Sato, as The Wind Rises in 1956, translated by Eiichi Hayashi, and as The Wind Awakes in 1967. A translation under the novel's original title was provided by Mikio Kawamura, also in 1967. A more recent translation by Francis B. Tenny, again as The Wind Has Risen, was published in 2007.

== Adaptations ==
The Wind Has Risen was twice adapted into film, in 1954 under the direction of Koji Shima, and in 1976 under the direction of Mitsuo Wakasugi. The 2013 anime film The Wind Rises took its title and one story element from Hori's novel.

The Wind Has Risen has also repeatedly been adapted for television.
