= Kōsaku Takii =

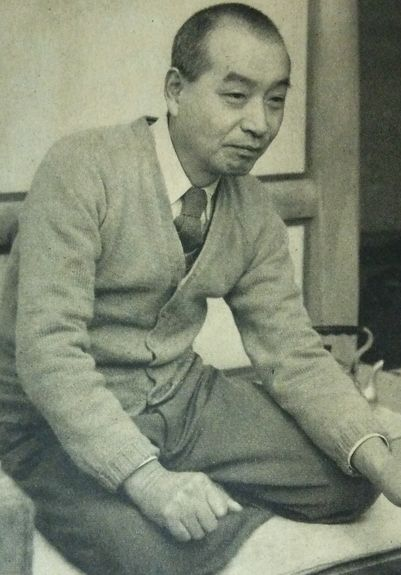
Takii Kosaku

Kōsaku Takii (滝井 孝作, Takii Kōsaku; April 4, 1894 – November 21, 1984) was a noted Japanese haiku poet, short story writer, and author of the celebrated I novel Mugen Hōyō.

== Early life ==
Takii was born in Takayama, Gifu where his father was a cabinetmaker. At age 13, he lost his mother and two brothers, and was forced to go work in the city's fish markets. In 1909, at age 15, he met haiku poet Kawahigashi Hekigotō and decided to devote his life to poetry.

== Early career ==
He moved to Tokyo in 1914, where he worked as editor of the haiku magazine Kaikō (Sea Crimson), and was an occasional student at Waseda University. Under the influence of Naoya Shiga, he began publishing fiction in 1919. That same year, he married a prostitute with whom he lived until her death in 1922. His celebrated novel, Mugen Hōyō (The Infinite Embrace), written as four stories in the years 1921-1924, recounts their relationship.

Following Shiga, Takii moved to Abiko, Chiba, in 1922, then Kyoto in 1923 and Nara in 1925.

== Later career ==
In 1930 he struck off with his second wife for Hachiōji, her home town, and during World War II worked for the army. All the while he continued to publish essays and stories. In 1959 he became a member of the Japan Art Academy. He received the 1968 Yomiuri Prize for Yashu, a collection of short stories, and the Nihon Bungaku Taisho (Grand Prize of Japanese Literature) in 1974 for Haijin Nakama (Companions of haiku, published in five parts 1969-1973). Takii died of kidney failure and is buried in the Daiyu-ji Temple Cemetery in Takayama, Gifu.

== Sources ==
- Donald Keene, Dawn to the West: Japanese literature of the modern era, fiction, Volume 1, Columbia University Press, 2nd edition, 1998, pages 531-532. ISBN 978-0-231-11434-9.
- Shunkin Litterature Japonaise entry
