= Masashi Matsuie =

Japanese novelist and editor

- 松家仁之
- Born: 1958 (age 67–68); Tokyo, Japan
- Education: Waseda University
- Occupations: Novelist, editor
- Writing career
- Language: Japanese
- Notable works: Kazan no fumoto de; Hikari no inu
- Notable awards: Yomiuri Prize for Literature; Kawai Hayao Story Prize; Art Encouragement Prize of the Minister of Education, Culture, Sports, Science and Technology

Masashi Matsuie (Japanese: 松家仁之, Hepburn: Matsuie Masashi; born 1958) is a Japanese novelist and editor. He worked for the publishing house Shinchosha, where he helped launch the translated-fiction imprint Shincho Crest Books and served as founding editor-in-chief of the quarterly magazine Kangaeru hito. His 2012 debut novel Kazan no fumoto de won the 64th Yomiuri Prize for Literature. His 2017 novel Hikari no inu won the Kawai Hayao Story Prize and the Art Encouragement Prize of the Minister of Education, Culture, Sports, Science and Technology.

== Early life and editing career ==
Matsuie was born in Tokyo in 1958 and graduated from Waseda University. He joined Shinchosha in 1982 and worked in literary and magazine editing before moving to the publishing division. In 1998 he launched Shincho Crest Books, a series specialising in translations of foreign literature, and in 2002 he founded Kangaeru hito, becoming its editor-in-chief. He also served as editor-in-chief of Geijutsu Shincho from 2006 and left Shinchosha in 2010.

From 2009 to 2014, Matsuie was a specially appointed professor at Keio University's Faculty of Policy Management. He later became associated with Tsuru & Hana Co., where he is listed as an editor and director.

== Fiction ==
Matsuie's first novel, Kazan no fumoto de, was published in Japan in 2012. The novel, set around an architectural office working near Mount Asama, won the Yomiuri Prize for Literature and was later translated into English by Margaret Mitsutani. The English translation was published in 2025 in the United States as The Summer House and in the United Kingdom as Summer at Mount Asama.

His subsequent novels include Shizumu Furanshisu (2013), Yūga na no ka dō ka, wakaranai (2014), Hikari no inu (2017), Awa (2021), and Tenshi mo fumu o osoreru tokoro (2025). Hikari no inu, a multi-generational novel set in a fictional town in Hokkaido, received the sixth Kawai Hayao Story Prize in 2018.

== Awards and honours ==
- 1979: Honorable mention, 48th Bungakukai New Writer's Prize, for "Yoru no ki"
- 2013: 64th Yomiuri Prize for Literature, for Kazan no fumoto de
- 2018: 6th Kawai Hayao Story Prize, for Hikari no inu
- 2018: Art Encouragement Prize of the Minister of Education, Culture, Sports, Science and Technology, for Hikari no inu

== Selected works ==
=== Novels ===
- Kazan no fumoto de (火山のふもとで; 2012); translated by Margaret Mitsutani as The Summer House (Other Press, 2025) and Summer at Mount Asama (The Indigo Press, 2025)
- Shizumu Furanshisu (沈むフランシス; 2013)
- Yūga na no ka dō ka, wakaranai (優雅なのかどうか、わからない; 2014)
- Hikari no inu (光の犬; 2017)
- Awa (泡; 2021)
- Tenshi mo fumu o osoreru tokoro (天使も踏むを畏れるところ; 2025)

=== Other works ===
- Atarashii Suga Atsuko (新しい須賀敦子; 2015; co-authored with Kaori Ekuni, edited by Yutaka Yukawa)
- Utsukushii kodomo (美しい子ども; 2013; editor)
- Itami Jūzō senshū (伊丹十三選集; 2018–2019; co-editor)
