= Yoshinori Yagi =

Japanese writer

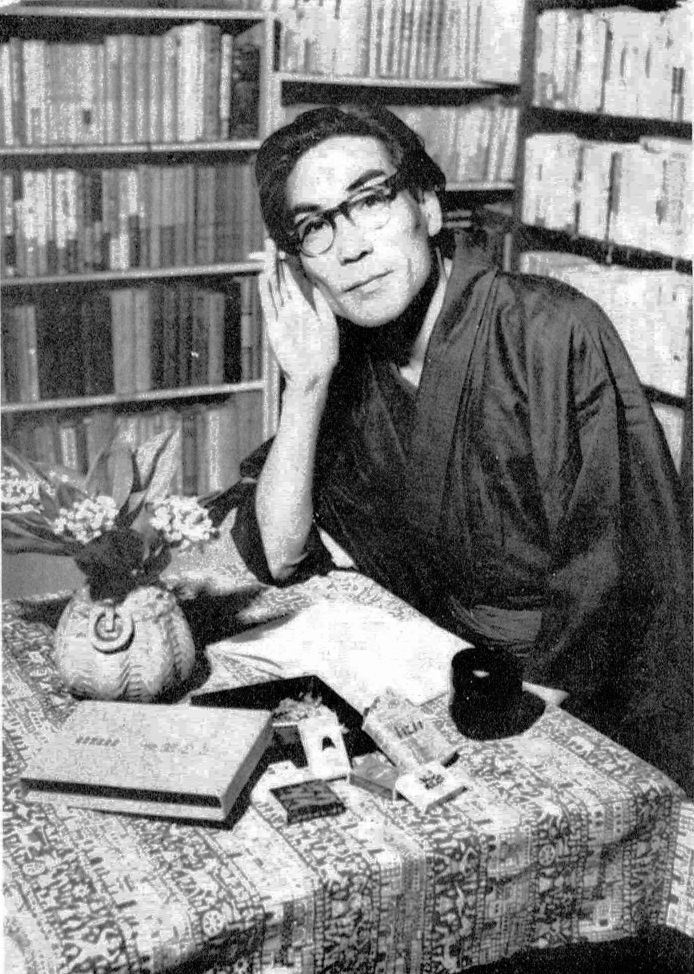
- Yoshinori Yagi
- Born: October 21, 1911; Muroran, Hokkaidō, Japan
- Died: November 9, 1999 (aged 88)
- Education: Waseda University
- Writing career
- Notable works: Ryūkanbu; Kazamatsuri
- Notable awards: 1944 Akutagawa Prize for Ryūkanbu; 1976 Yomiuri Prize for Kazamatsuri

Yoshinori Yagi (八木 義徳, Yagi Yoshinori; October 21, 1911 – November 9, 1999) was a noted Japanese author.

Yagi was born in Muroran, Hokkaidō, and graduated from Waseda University in 1938 with a degree in French literature. In 1944 he became employed in the chemical industry in Manchuria. As a writer, he was a devotee of Fyodor Dostoyevsky and Takeo Arishima, and received the 1944 Akutagawa Prize for 劉廣福 Ryūkanbu and the 1976 Yomiuri Prize for Kazamatsuri. Some of his materials are now exhibited in Muroran's Literature Museum.

His Dharma name was Keiunin Zuishin Gitoku Koji (景雲院随心義徳居士).
