= Fujio Noguchi =

Japanese writer

Noguchi Fujio (野口 富士男, Noguchi Fujio, 4 July 1911 - 22 November 1993) was the pen-name of a novelist in Shōwa period Japan, known primarily for his biographical works and works on literary history. His real name was Fujio Hirai.

Noguchi was born in Kōjimachi, Tokyo, and studied at Keio University. His first published work was a novel about the pathos in the lives of common people, Kaze no keifu ("Genealogy of the Wind", 1940).

In the post-World War II period, he turned to works biography and literary history, with Tokuda Shusei den ("Biography of Tokuda Shusei", 1965) about the noted author. This was followed by Kurai yoru no watashi ("Myself on a Dark Night", 1969), describing the literary world in Japan during the 1920s and 1930s. His biography of Nagai Kafu Waga Kafu ("My Kafu", 1969), was awarded the Yomiuri Prize. In 1981 he was awarded the Japan Art Academy Prize, and in 1986, he published Kanshokuteki Shōwa bundan shi ("An Impressionistic History of Shōwa Literature").

== See also ==
- Japanese literature
- List of Japanese authors
