= Dakotsu Iida =

Japanese poet

Dakotsu Iida(飯田 蛇笏)
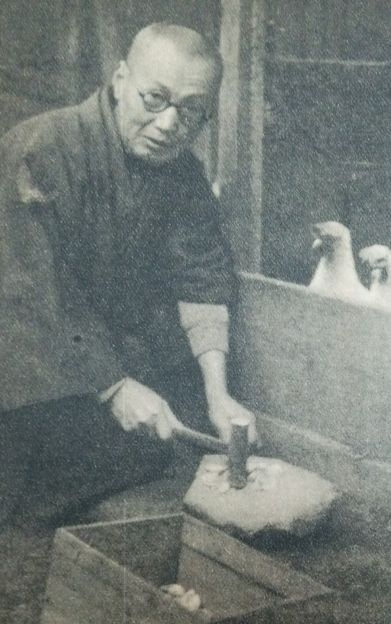
- Dakotsu Iida
- Born: Takeji Iida (飯田 武治); April 26, 1885; Fuefuki, Yamanashi, Japan
- Died: October 3, 1962 (aged 77)
- Occupation: Poet

Dakotsu Iida (飯田 蛇笏, Iida Dakotsu; 26 April 1885 – 3 October 1962) was a Japanese haiku poet from what is now part of the city of Fuefuki, Yamanashi, Japan. Commonly referred to as Dakotsu, his real name was Takeji Iida (飯田 武治, Iida Takeji). He trained under Kyoshi Takahama, and was a frequent contributor to such haiku journals as Hototogisu (magazine) and Unmo . He was chief editor of Unmo until his death, upon which his son, the prominent haiku poet Ryuta Iida, took over as the editor of Unmo.

== Partial bibliography ==
- Sanro shū, (The Mountain Hat Collection, 1932)
- Reishi, (The Ten-Thousand-Year Mushroom, 1940)
- Shinzō, (The Mind's Eye, 1947)
- Sekkyō, (Snow Gorge, 1951),
- Kakyō no kiri, (Fog and My Native Land, 1956).

== See also ==
- Dakotsu Prize
