= Toshio Moriuchi =

Japanese writer (1936–2023)

Toshio Moriuchi (森内 俊雄, Moriuchi Toshio; December 12, 1936 – August 5, 2023) was a Japanese author. He was born in Osaka Prefecture and graduated from Waseda University. He won the 42nd Yomiuri Prize (1990) for Hyōga ga kuru made ni.

Moriuchi died from pneumonia on August 5, 2023, at the age of 86.
