= Yomiuri Prize =

Japanese literary award

Yomiuri Prize for Literature
- 読売文学賞 (Yomiuri Bungaku Shō)
- Awarded for: Best new literary works
- Country: Japan
- Presented by: Yomiuri Shimbun
- Reward: ¥2,000,000, inkstone
- First award: 1949; 77 years ago
- Website: info.yomiuri.co.jp/contest/clspgl/bungaku.html

The Yomiuri Prize for Literature (読売文学賞, Yomiuri Bungaku Shō) is a literary award in Japan. The prize was founded in 1949 by the Yomiuri Shimbun Company to help form a "strong cultural nation". The winner is awarded two million Japanese yen and an inkstone.

== Award categories ==
For the first two years, awards were granted in four categories: novels and plays, poetry, literary criticism, and scholarly studies. In 1950, novels and plays were split to form a total of five categories. This was further reorganized in 1966 to form six categories: novels, plays, essays and travel journals, criticism and biography, poetry, and academic studies and translation.

== Award winners ==
The Yomiuri Shimbun maintains an official list of current and past prize recipients.

=== Fiction ===
Year	Winner	Winning entry
1949	Masuji Ibuse	Honjitsu Kyushin (本日休診)
1950	Kōji Uno	Omigawa (思ひ川, River of Thought)
1951	Shōhei Ōoka	Nobi (Fires on the Plain)
1952	Hiroyuki Agawa	Haru no shiro (Citadel in Spring)
1953	No award	
1954	Haruo Satō	(Shōshi Mandara)
1955	Ton Satomi	Koigokoro
	Aya Kōda	Kuroi suso
1956	Yukio Mishima	Kinkakuji (The Temple of the Golden Pavilion)
	Mantarō Kubota	San no tori
1957	Murō Saisei	Anzukko
	Yaeko Nogami	Meiro
1958	No award	
1959	Hakuchō Masamune	Kotoshi no aki
	Shigeharu Nakano	Nashi no hana
1960	Shigeru Tonomura	Miotsukushi
1961	No award	
1962	Kōbō Abe	Suna no Onna (The Woman in the Dunes)
1963	Yasushi Inoue	Fūtō
1964	Akatsuki Kambayashi	Shiroi yakatabune
1965	Junzo Shono	Yube no Kumo (Evening Clouds)
1966	Fumio Niwa	Ichiro
1967	Kiku Amino	Ichigo-ichie
1968	Taeko Kōno	Fui no koe (不意の声, A Sudden Voice)
	Kōsaku Takii	Yashu
1969	Haruto Kō	Ichijō no hikari
	Tan Onuma	Kaichūdokei
1970	Ken'ichi Yoshida	Gareki no naka
1971	No award	
1972	Tatsuo Nagai	Cochabamba-yuki
1973	Tsuneko Nakazato	Utamakura
	Shōtarō Yasuoka	Hashire tomahōku
1974	Yoshie Wada	Tsugiki no dai
1975	Kazuo Dan	Kataku no hito
	Junnosuke Yoshiyuki	Kaban no nakami
1976	Yoshinori Yagi	Kazamatsuri
1977	Toshio Shimao	Shi no toge
1978	Noguchi Fujio	Kakute arikeri
1979	Toshimasa Shimamura	Myōkō no aki
1980	No award	
1981	Hisashi Inoue	Kirikirijin
	Ryōtarō Shiba	Hitobito no ashioto
1982	Kenzaburō Ōe	Ame no ki (Rain Tree)
1983	No award	
1984	Akira Yoshimura	Hagoku (Prison Break)
1985	Takako Takahashi	Ikari no ko (Child of Wrath)
	Hideo Takubo	Kaizu
1986	Yūko Tsushima	Yoru no hikari ni owarete
1987	Tatsuhiko Shibusawa	Takaoka Shinnō kōkaiki
1988	Takehiro Irokawa	Kyōjin nikki
1989	Yūichi Takai	Yoru no ari
	Yoshikichi Furui	Kari ōjōden shibun
1990	Toshio Moriuchi	Hyōga ga kuru made ni
1991	Hiroshi Sakagami	Yasashii teihakuchi
	Sō Aono	Haha yo
1992	Eisuke Nakazono	Peking hanten kyūkan nite
1993	No award	
1994	Momoko Ishii	Maboroshi no akai mi
	Senji Kuroi	Kāten kōru
1995	Keizō Hino	Hikari
	Haruki Murakami	Nejimakidori kuronikuru (The Wind-Up Bird Chronicle)
1996	No award	
1997	Ryū Murakami	In za miso-sūpu (In the Miso Soup)
	Nobuo Kojima	Uruwashiki hibi
1998	Kunio Ogawa	Hashisshi gyangu (The Hashish Gang)
	Noboru Tsujihara	Tobe kirin (Fly, Kirin!)
1999	Yasutaka Tsutsui	Watashi no gurampa
	Taku Miki	Hadashi to kaigara
2000	Naoyuki Ii	Nigotta gekiryū ni kakaru hashi (A Bridge over a Muddy Torrent)
	Amy Yamada	A2Z
2001	Anna Ogino	Horafuki-Anri no bōken
2002	Minae Mizumura	Honkaku shōsetsu (A True Novel)
2003	Yōko Ogawa	Hakase no aishita sūshiki (The Housekeeper and the Professor)
2004	Hisaki Matsuura	Hantō
2005	Toshiyuki Horie	Kagan bōjitsushō
	Katsusuke Miyauchi	Shōshin
2006	No award	
2007	Rieko Matsuura	Kenshin
2008	Sou Kurokawa	Kamome no hi
2009	Kaoru Takamura	Taiyō o hiku uma
2010	Natsuo Kirino	Nanika aru
2011	No award	
2012	Yoko Tawada	Kumo o tsukamu hanashi
	Masashi Matsuie	Kazan no fumuto de
2013	Kiyoko Murata	Yūjōko
2014	Hiromi Kawakami	Suisei
	Tomoyuki Hoshino	Yoru wa owaranai
2015	Hideo Furukawa	Onna-tachi sanbyaku-nin no uragiri no sho (女たち三百人の裏切りの書)
2016	Hideo Levy	Mohankyo (模範郷)
2017	Akira Higashiyama	Boku ga koroshita hito to boku o koroshita hito (僕が殺した人と僕を殺した人)
2018	Keiichiro Hirano	A Man (ある男, Aru otoko)

=== Drama ===
Year	Winner	Winning entry
1951	Jūrō Miyoshi	Honō no hito, etc.
1952	Tsuneari Fukuda	Ryū o nadeta otoko
1954	Chikao Tanaka	Selection of works including "Kyōiku"
1961	Yukio Mishima	Toka no Kiku
1964	Mitsuo Nakamura	Kiteki issei
1965	Hideji Hōjō	Selected plays of Hideji Hōjō
1967	Tadasu Iizawa	Gonin no moyono
1972	Seiichi Yashiro	Sharaku-kō
1974	Kōbō Abe	Midoriiro no sutokkingu (The green stockings)
1975	Matsuyo Akimoto	Nananin no misaki
1978	Junji Kinoshita	Shigosen no matsuri
1979	Hisashi Inoue	Shimijimi nihon – Nogi-taishō, Kobayashi Issa
1983	Kunio Shimizu	Elegy
1984	Masakazu Yamazaki	Oedipus shōten
1987	Minoru Betsuyaku	Shokoku o henreki suru futari no kishi no monogatari
1990	Kouhei Tsuka	Hiryūden ’90 – satsuriku no aki
1992	Tsutsumi Harue	Kanadehon Hamlet
1994	Yoshiyuki Fukuda	Watashi no downtown – Haha no shashin
1995	Jūichiro Takeuchi	Tsuki no hikari
1997	Ryo Iwamatsu	TV Days
	Nozomi Makino	Tokyo genshikaku club
1998	Matsuda Masataka	Natsu no suna no ue (Over Summer Sands)
2000	Ai Nagai	Hagi-ke no sanshimai
2001	Kankurō Kudō	GO
2002	Sakate Yôji	Yaneura (The Attic)
2003	Kara Jûrô	Doro ningyo (Mud Mermaid)
2005	Hishida Shinya	Powder – oshiroi
2006	Miwa Nishikawa	Yureru
	Noda Hideki	Rope
2007	Kōki Mitani	Confidant – Kizuna
2008	Kundō Koyama	Okuribito
2009	Shoji Kokami	Globe Jungle Kyokō no gekidan hataage 3 busaku
2011	Tomohiro Maekawa	Taiyō
2012	Yang Yong-hi	Kazoku no kuni

=== Poetry and haiku ===
Year	Winner	Winning entry (Genre)
1949	Mokichi Saitō	Tomoshibi (Tanka)
	Shinpei Kusano	Kaeru no shi (Free Verse)
1950	Kōtarō Takamura	Tenkei (Free Verse)
	Yaichi Aizu	Aizu Yaichi zenkashū (Tanka)
1951	Satarō Satō	Kichō (Tanka)
1952	Haruo Satō	Satō Haruo zenshishū (Free Verse)
1953	Takashi Matsumoto	Ishidamashii (Haiku)
	Mitsuharu Kaneko	Ningen no higeki (Free verse)
1954	Hakyō Ishida	Teihon Ishida Hakyō zenkushū (Haiku)
1955	No award	
1956	Junzaburō Nishiwaki	Dai-san no shinwa (Free verse)
1966	Yuji Kinoshita	TREELIKE
1969	Ryuta Iida	Forget (Haiku)
1987	Mutsuo Takahashi	Keiko onjiki (Tanka & haiku)
	Hirohiko Okano	Ame no Tazumura (Tanka)
1993	Akiko Baba	Akobu
1999	Nagata Kazuhiro	Aiba
2003	Kai Hasegawa	Kyoku (Emptiness)
2004	Kyōko Kuriki	Natsu no ushiro (In Back of Summer)
2017	Jeffrey Angles	Watashi no hizukehenkōsen (My International Date Line)

=== Essay and Travelogue ===
Year	Winner	Winning entry
1967	Ikuma Dan	sei/zoku 'Paipu no Kemuri'(正/続「パイプのけむり」)
1971	Ibuse Masuji	Waseda no Mori (The Woods around Waseda University)
1988	Kazuo Mizuta	On the Pacific Age—Promoting a Pacific University
1999	None awarded	
2003	Mikirō Sasaki	Ajia kaidô kikô (A Travel Journal of the Asian Seaboard)
2004	Wakashima Tadashi	Ranshidokusha no Ei-Bei tanpen kôgi (An Astigmatic Reader's Lectures on British and American Short Fiction)
2009	Keijiro Suga	Shasen no tabi (Transversal Journeys)

=== Criticism and biography ===
Year	Winner	Winning entry
1999	Seiko Tanabe	Dôtonbori no ame ni wakarete irai nari (Since Parting in the Rain at Dotombori)
2003	Takehiko Noguchi	Bakumatsu kibun (That Late-Bakufu Feeling)
2004	Mitsuyoshi Numano	Yūtopia bungaku ron (On Utopian Literature)

=== Scholarship and translation ===
Year	Winner	Winning entry
1990	(Translated by) Noriko Ibaragi	Kankoku gendai shi sen (「韓国現代詩選」)
1999	Yûhi Takashi	Edo shiika-ron (Edo Period Poetry)
1999	(Translated by) Kudô Yukio	Burûno Shurutsu zenshû (The Collected Works of Bruno Shultz)
2003	Takematsu Yûichi	Igirisu kindaishi hô (Modern British Poetry)
2004	Tanizawa Eiichi	Bungôtachi no ôgenka (Great Fights Between the Literary Masters)
2008	(Translated by) Noriaki Oshikawa	Rumah Kaca (Glass House)

== See also ==
- List of Japanese literary awards
