= Ryuta Iida =

Japanese poet

Ryuta Iida (Japanese: 飯田 龍太, Hepburn: Iida Ryūta, July 10, 1920 – February 25, 2007) was a haiku poet from Yamanashi Prefecture, the son of the haiku poet Dakotsu Iida.

== Biography ==
Born into the family of the well-known haiku poet Dakotsu Iida, Ryuta Iida suffered from poor health in his childhood, and was brought up by his grandmother. His brothers died in their childhood. He was educated at Sakaigawa elementary school. The future poet was fond of reading, and he especially liked novels by Leo Tolstoy. He graduated from university in 1947, with a thesis about Matsuo Bashō. After that, he earned his living as a rice farmer and later as a journalist.

In 1951 he began to work as a librarian at the library of Yamanashi prefecture in Kōfu city but later embarked on a new career as a creative writer. His first book came out in 1954. He took an active part in the so-called Modern Haiku Movement. In 1956, he won the Yamanaki Literary Prize; in 1957, the 6th Modern Haiku Association Award for his haiku. In 1960, he was made a columnist in the local newspaper "Mica", for which he had been writing articles since the end of the Second World War. His father Dakotsu, who edited the prestigious haiku magazine "Unmo", died in 1962, and Ryuta Iida took over as the editor.

In 1969, Ryuta Iida was awarded the 20th Yomiuri Literary Prize. In 1984, he became a member of the Japan Art Institute. In 2005, Kadokawa Shoten Publishing brought out his Complete Works in ten volumes.

In 2007, the poet died of pneumonia in the local hospital in Kōfu at the age of 86. Two years later, Kadokawa Shoten Publishing brought out a volume of his Complete Poems. Ryuta Iida is regarded as one of the best haiku poets of the 20th century.

== Books ==
- "One hundred noodles" (Shinchu, 1954)
- "Children" (Kadokawa Shoten, 1959)
- "People at the foot" (Mica Inc., 1965)
- "Forget" (Shepherd Publications, 1968)
- "The way of spring" (Shepherd Publications, 1971)
- "Mountain Tree" (Tachibana Shoso, 1975 / Eshorin (Echora Haiku Bunko), 1996)
- "Ryo Night" (Shogo Shobo, 1977)
- "Konno" (Tachibana Shobo, 1981)
- "Shadow of the Mountains" (Tachibana Shobo, 1985)
- "Slow" (Tachikawa Shobo, 1991)
- "Iida Ryuta Complete Works" (Volume 1 – Volume 10) (Kadokawa Shoten, 2005)
- "Iida Ryuta's Complete Poems" (Kadokawa Shoten, 2009)
