= A Man (Hirano novel) =

2018 novel by Keiichiro Hirano

- Author: Keiichiro Hirano
- Translator: Eli K. P. Williams
- Language: Japanese
- Publisher: Bungeishunju (Japanese); Amazon Crossing (English)
- Publication date: September 30, 2018 (Japanese); June 1, 2020 (English)
- Publication place: Japan
- Awards: Yomiuri Literary Prize
- ISBN: 978-4-16-390902-8
- Preceded by: ドーン (Dawn)

A Man (ある男, Aru otoko) is a 2018 novel by Keiichiro Hirano. It was originally published in Bungakukai's June 2018 issue and then published as a novel by Bungeishunjū a few months later. The novel then went on to win the 70th Yomiuri Literary Prize. In 2020, an English translation by Eli K. P. William was released by Amazon Crossing, marking Hirano's debut in the English language. In 2022, the novel was adapted to film by director Kei Ishikawa and won the Japan Academy Film Prize for Picture of the Year.

== Synopsis ==
The novel follows a divorce attorney, Akira Kido. Eventually, a former client of his appears, Rie Takemoto, who sets Kido on an investigation regarding her late husband. However, upon inquiring further about the late husband's life, he finds out that his entire identity was fabricated, prompting him to set out on a quest to find out who Rie's husband really was. All the while, Kido's own marriage risks deterioration.

== Critical reception ==
=== English ===
Publishers Weekly stated "Hirano's stylish, suspenseful noir should earn him a stateside audience." The Japan Times found the story's unfolding satisfactory.

== Film adaptation ==
In 2022, the novel was adapted to film by director Kei Ishikawa and premiered at the 79th Venice International Film Festival. The film went on to win 8 awards at the Japan Academy Film Prizes, including Best Picture. Many of the film's actors won awards as well, with Satoshi Tsumabuki winning Best Actor, Masataka Kubota winning Best Supporting Actor, and Sakura Ando winning Best Supporting Actress.

== Musical adaptation ==
A stage musical adaptation had been announced by Horipro, to premiere in 2025. It is composed by Jason Howland, with lyrics by Chikae Takahashi and book by Misaki Setoyama, who is also directing. The original cast features Kenji Urai, Teppei Koike, Megumi Hamada, Sonim, and Takeshi Kaga.
