= Yūji Kinoshita =

Japanese poet (1914–1965)

Yūji Kinoshita (木下夕爾, Kinoshita Yūji; 27 October 1914 – 4 August 1965) was a Japanese poet, a member of the group associated with the journal Shiki, and famous during his lifetime for his pastoral poetry. Many of his haiku appear in English-language anthologies.

He was born the second son of Tsuneichi Kinoshita in Miyuki, a village in the eastern part of Hiroshima Prefecture. On 22 July 1920, his father was killed at work; on 3 August 1922, his mother married Tsuneichi's brother, Itsu, a pharmacist.

In 1932, Kinoshita began studying French literature at Waseda in Tokyo, but he was forced to switch to pharmacology in Nagoya in order to continue the family business, when his elder brother became a doctor. This unwelcome career change was cemented by the death on 15 September 1935 of his stepfather.

Kinoshita disliked working as a pharmacist and is described by his family as a distant man who frequently undercharged his clients for the medicine he provided. He spent all of his spare time on his poems, of which 400 survive. They were published in ten collections.

In July 1965, he wrote his last poem, "Gone So Long", commissioned by a newspaper for the 20th anniversary of the bombing of Hiroshima. He died a month later of colon cancer. His complete works were published in November of the same year. He was the winner of the Yomiuri Prize in 1966.

== Bibliography ==
- Robert Epp. Kinoshita Yūji. TWAS 662. Twayne, Boston, 1982.
- Kinoshita Yūji. Treelike: The Poetry of Kinoshita Yūji. Translated by Robert Epp. Oakland University, Katydid Books, 1982.
