= A Dark Night's Passing =

Novel by Naoya Shiga

- Cover of English edition
- Author: Naoya Shiga
- Translator: Edwin McClellan
- Language: Japanese
- Publisher: Kaizō
- Publication date: 1921–1937
- Publication place: Japan
- Media type: Print

A Dark Night's Passing (暗夜行路, An'ya kōro) is the only full-length novel by Japanese writer Naoya Shiga. It was published in serialised form in the magazine Kaizō between 1921 and 1937. The story follows the life of a wealthy, young Japanese writer in the early 1900s, who seeks to escape his unhappiness through marriage.

== Synopsis ==
A Dark Night's Passing is divided into four parts. Its protagonist is Tokitō Kensaku, a young aspiring writer who learns of a dark secret in his family. As a young boy he is sent to live with his paternal grandfather and his mistress Oei. His grandfather and his mother die soon after from illness.

In Part One, Kensaku, who resides in Tokyo with Oei, goes about his daily life. Rebounding from a rejected marriage proposal, he sleeps late, wanders around the city, and goes drinking with his friends in the evenings. Thanks to his family's money, he is independently wealthy. Kensaku and his friends visit geisha, and he begins visiting prostitutes on his own. He finds it difficult to maintain a disciplined lifestyle and make progress with his writing. He develops an interest in a few geishas and bar girls, but his interest comes to nothing.

Part Two concerns Kensaku's trip to the seaside town of Onomichi. Kensaku goes there hoping to do some serious writing, but instead becomes lonely and finds himself proposing to Oei, about twenty years his senior, asking his elder brother Nobuyuki to act as their intermediary. In their correspondence, Nobuyuki tells him a dark secret: Kensaku was conceived as the result of a brief, perhaps involuntary, affair between their mother and their paternal grandfather, with whom she was living while their father was studying in Germany. His father chose to forgive his late mother, but this explains the somewhat cold attitude his father had always had towards him. Kensaku wonders if this is why his marriage proposal to Aiko was turned down. Kensaku's father is strongly opposed to the marriage. Oei turns down Kensaku's proposal, and Kensaku returns to Tokyo, where they go on living together as before.

In Part Three Kensaku visits Kyoto and decides to make the city his home. He sees a young lady there while out for a walk, and takes a fancy to her. A friend helps him find out who she is, and an aristocratic friend of their family agrees to act as a go-between. Kensaku and Naoko marry, and the first year of their marriage is blissful, but when Naoko gives birth to a baby boy, he dies in his infancy from erysipelas. Oei decides to go overseas to Tianjin, China, to help her cousin with her geisha/restaurant business.

In Part Four, Naoko and Kensaku mourn their dead baby. Kensaku travels to Korea to rescue Oei, who has had a falling out with her cousin, has been robbed, and then has almost been raped by a Japanese police officer who she had been staying with in occupied Korea. While Kensaku is gone, Naoko's cousin comes for a visit. After an all night card party with his friends, he rapes Naoko. Kensaku senses something is wrong when he returns, and Naoko confesses. Kensaku is upset, and while outwardly forgiving Naoko, their relationship becomes strained and he is seething with resentment. Naoko gives birth to a baby girl. Oei now lives with the couple and their housekeeper. Kensaku acts out on his repressed anger against Naoko in increasingly violent ways, until he finally pushes her from a moving train when he loses his temper after she insists on boarding after he tells her it is not safe to do so. Naoko is only slightly injured, but is deeply hurt by Kensaku's behavior. Kensaku decides to go on a pilgrimage to a remote Buddhist temple on Mount Daisen, after realizing his temper has caused an estrangement between him and his wife. He finds peace during his time on the mountain, taking long walks and observing nature, despite the decidedly secular routine of the "temple". He decides to join a night hike up the mountain, but suffering from food poisoning, he drops out and the other hikers continue. He spends the night alone on the mountainside, and feels an exalted sense of oneness with nature and the universe. Seriously ill when he returns the next day, a doctor is called, and then a telegram is sent to Naoko, who comes immediately. The novel ends unresolved - Naoko realizes that she would not be terribly sad if Kensaku dies, but on the other hand she feels she is bound to him forever.

== Publication history ==
A Dark Night's Passing was published in serialised form in the left-leaning general interest magazine Kaizō, starting in 1921. In 1922, the first part was published in book form by Shinchosha. The serialisation ended in 1937; the same year, the novel's second part was published in book form by Kaizōsha, the publishing house of Kaizō, in the anthology Shiga Naoya zenshū ("Shiga Naoya collected works").

== Legacy ==
A Dark Night's Passing is regarded as Shiga's major work. While Shiga's body of work is mostly associated with the I-novel genre, A Dark Night's Passing contains many fictional elements. On the other hand, writer Shūsaku Endō saw Shiga's novel less as a work of fiction than as a "long essay". The novel's protagonist, Kensaku, has been associated with its author by most readers.

The novel was adapted for film by director Shirō Toyoda in 1959.

== English translation ==
- Shiga, Naoya (1976). A Dark Night's Passing. Translated by McClellan, Edwin. Tokyo: Kodansha International.

== Other Resources ==
- Tsuruta, Kin'ya, ed. (1996). Shiga Naoya's A Dark Night's Passing: Proceedings of a Workshop at the National University of Singapore, December 1994. Singapore: Department of Japanese Studies, National University of Singapore. ISBN 9789810081140.
