= Roy Starrs =

British-Canadian scholar

Roy Starrs (born 1946) is a British-Canadian scholar of Japanese literature and culture who teaches at the University of Otago in New Zealand. He has written critical studies of the major Japanese writers Yasunari Kawabata, Naoya Shiga, Osamu Dazai, and Yukio Mishima, and edited books on Asian nationalism (especially ethnic nationalism, religious nationalism, and cultural nationalism), globalization, pan-Asianism, Japanese modernism, and cultural responses to disaster in Japan. He has also published essays on Japan-related topics such as the Kojiki, Lafcadio Hearn, and Japanese calligraphy.

Roy Starrs is also the Japan editor of the online The Literary Encyclopedia.

Starrs was born in Birmingham, England on November 18, 1946 and became a Canadian citizen as an adult. He received his Ph.D. from the University of British Columbia in 1986 and previously taught at University of British Columbia, Union College (New York), and Aarhus University (Denmark).

== Works by Roy Starrs ==
- Deadly Dialectics: Sex, Violence, and Nihilism in the World of Yukio Mishima, University of Hawaiʻi Press, 1994, ISBN 0-8248-1630-7 and ISBN 0-8248-1630-7.
- Soundings in Time: The Fictive Art of Kawabata Yasunari. University of Hawaiʻi Press/RoutledgeCurzon. 1998. ISBN 1-873410-74-3.
- An Artless Art - The Zen Aesthetic of Shiga Naoya: A Critical Study with Selected Translations. RoutledgeCurzon (1998). ISBN 1-873410-64-6.
- "Writing the National Narrative: Changing Attitudes Towards Nation-Building Among Japanese Writers, 1900-1930", in Japan’s Competing Modernities: Issues in Culture and Democracy, 1900-1930. S. Minichiello ed. Honolulu, University of Hawaii Press (1998), pages 161–189 ISBN 0-8248-1931-4 (cloth) ISBN 0-8248-2080-0 (paper).
- Asian Nationalism in an Age of Globalization. London: RoutledgeCurzon. 2001. ISBN 978-1-903350-03-4.
- Nations Under Siege: Globalization and Nationalism in Asia. New York: Palgrave Macmillan. 2002. ISBN 978-0-312-29410-6.
- Japanese Cultural Nationalism: At Home and in the Asia Pacific. London: Global Oriental. 2004. ISBN 978-1-901903-11-9.
- "Nation and Region in the Work of Dazai Osamu," in Roy Starrs Japanese Cultural Nationalism: At Home and in the Asia Pacific. London: Global Oriental. 2004. ISBN 978-1-901903-11-9.
- "The Road to Violent Action: Mishima Yukio," in Fascism: Critical Concepts in Political Science, volume 5 (Postwar Fascisms), edited by Roger Griffin with Matthew Feldman. London; New York: Routledge. (Part of the Routledge Major Work series.) (2004), pages 249–266. ISBN 0-415-29015-5.
- "The Kojiki as Japan's National Narrative," in Asian Futures, Asian Traditions, edited by Edwina Palmer. Folkestone, Kent: Global Oriental. ISBN 1-901903-16-8.
- "Lafcadio Hearn as Japanese Nationalist," in Nichibunken Japan Review: Journal of the International Research Center for Japanese Studies, Number 18, 2006, pages 181–213.
- "Ink Traces of the Dancing Calligraphers: Zen-ei Sho in Japan Today," in Henry Johnson and Jerry C. Jaffe, eds. Performing Japan: Contemporary Expressions of Cultural Identity London, Global Oriental and Honolulu: University of Hawai’i Press (2008). ISBN 1-905246-31-5.
- "Politics and Religion in Japan," in Religion Compass 3/4 (2009), pages 752–769. (http://www.blackwell-compass.com/subject/religion/)
- Starrs, Roy (December 2009). "A Devil of a Job: mishima and the masochistic drive". Angelaki. 14 (3): 85–99. doi:10.1080/09697250903407583. S2CID 144886461.
- Modernism and Japanese Culture, London/New York: Palgrave Macmillan, 2011. (http://www.palgrave.com/products/title.aspx?pid=360186)
- ed., "Politics and Religion in Modern Japan: Red Sun, White Lotus," London/New York: Palgrave Macmillan, 2011. (http://www.palgrave.com/products/title.aspx?pid=385916)
- "Zen, Japan, and the Art of Democracy," in the "New Statesman," July 4, 2011. (http://www.newstatesman.com/asia/2011/07/japan-essay-nature-earthquake)
- ed., "Rethinking Japanese Modernism," Leiden and Boston: Brill, 2012. (http://www.brill.nl/rethinking-japanese-modernism)
- When the Tsunami Came to Shore: Culture and Disaster in Japan. Boston and Leiden: Brill. 2014. ISBN 9789004268296. (http://www.brill.com/products/book/when-tsunami-came-shore)
- "La estética Zen de Muga (Ni-Ego) en el proyecto Renga de Octavio Paz." In Rogelio Guedea, editor, Países en tránsito: estudios de literatura comparada. Oxford: Peter Lang, 2016.
- "Renga: A European Poem and its Japanese Model." Comparative Literature Studies (May 2017).
- "Japanese Poetry and the Aesthetics of Disaster." In Minh, N., New Essays in Japanese Aesthetics. Lexington: Rowman and Littlefield, 2017.
- "Japan’s Perennial New Man: The Liberal and Fascist Incarnations of Masamichi Rōyama." In Matthew Feldman et al, editors, The ‘New Man’ in Radical Right Ideology and Practice, 1919-45. London: Bloomsbury, 2018.
- "The Fortunes of Pan-Asianism: Past, Present and Future." In The Journal of World History. (University of Hawaiʻi Press, June 2018).
- Review of the book The culture of the quake: The great Kantō earthquake and Taishō Japan. Journal of Japanese Studies, 44(1), pages 203-207. doi:10.1353/jjs.2018.0023
- "The Tokyo Gas Attack Was Japan’s 9/11." In Fair Observer, July 11, 2018. (https://www.fairobserver.com/region/asia_pacific/tokyo-gas-attack-aum-shinrikyo-executions-japan-news-this-week-16521/)
- Review of the book The rise and fall of modern Japanese literature. Japan Review, 34, 238-239, 2019. doi:10.15055/00007424
- "Suzuki Daisetsu no reikanron: Bunka o koeta dentatsu ni idomu". In Y. Shoji & J. Breen (Eds.), Suzuki Daisetsu: Zen o koete. (pages 329–358). Kyoto: Shibunkaku, 2020.
- "Mishima, Bowie and the Anti-Metaphysics of the Mask", In Masks: Bowie and Artists of Artifice, edited by James Curcio. Bristol, United Kingdom: Intellect Books, 2020. ISBN 9781789381085 (https://www.intellectbooks.com/masks)
- Review of the book The rise and fall of modern Japanese literature. In Nihon Kenkyū, 62, 216–218, 2021. doi:10.15055/00007647
- "D. T. Suzuki's theory of inspiration and the challenges of cross-cultural transmission". In J. Breen, S. Fumihiko & Y. Shōji (Eds.), Beyond Zen: D. T. Suzuki and the modern transformation of Buddhism. (pages 225–246). Honolulu, HI: University of Hawaiʻi Press, 2022.
- Review of the book The awakening of modern Japanese fiction: Path literature and an interpretation of Buddhism. Eastern Buddhist, 2(2), 91–95, 2022.
- "The Paradoxes of Japan's Cultural Identity: Modernity and Tradition in Japanese Literature, Art, Politics and Religion. London: Routledge, 2025. ISBN 9789048559756 (https://www.routledge.com/The-Paradoxes-of-Japans-Cultural-Identity-Modernity-and-Tradition-in-Japanese-Literature-Art-Politics-and-Religion/Starrs/p/book/9781041188636)
