= Aizu Yaichi =

Japanese poet, calligrapher and historian

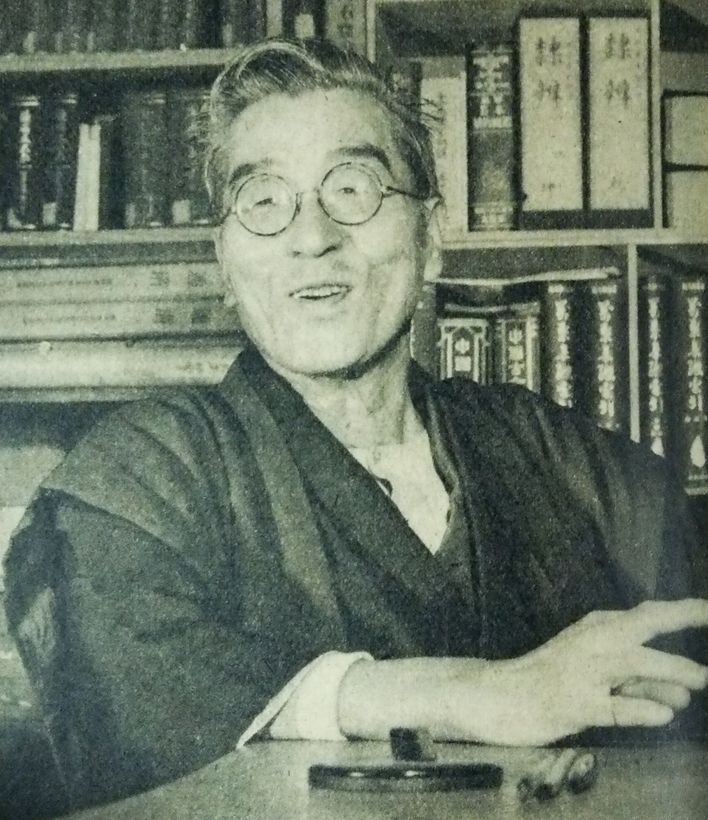
- Born: August 1, 1881; Niigata prefecture, Japan
- Died: November 21, 1956 (aged 75)
- Other name: 会津 八一
- Occupations: poet, calligrapher and historian

Aizu Yaichi (会津 八一; August 1, 1881 – November 21, 1956) was a Japanese poet, calligrapher and historian.

== Biography ==
Yaichi was born in the Furumachi area of Niigata, Niigata, and was a professor emeritus of ancient Chinese and Japanese art at Waseda University. His focus was mostly on Buddhist art of the Asuka and Nara eras.

In 1926 he advocated for the creation of an art history museum at Waseda University, and eventually collected a vast number of works. In 1951 he received the 2nd Yomiuri Prize.
