= Han's Crime =

1913 Japanese short story

- Short story by Naoya Shiga
- Original title: 范の犯罪; Han no hanzai
- Translator: Ivan Morris (1956); Lane Dunlop (1987)
- Country: Japan
- Language: Japanese

Publication
- Published in: Shirakaba
- Publication type: Magazine
- Media type: Print
- Publication date: 1913
- Published in English: 1956, 1987

Han's Crime (Japanese: 范の犯罪, Hepburn: Han no hanzai) is a short story by Japanese writer Naoya Shiga first published in 1913 in the magazine Shirakaba. The story follows a police hearing after a woman was killed during a circus knifethrowing act by the hands of her husband, the professional knifethrower Han.

== Plot ==
At a circus performance, a young woman is killed during a knifethrowing act by the hands of her husband Han, a professional knifethrower of Chinese descent and a devout, converted Christian. Han is arrested immediately after the incident. A judge first questions the circus director, then Han's assistant, and finally the defendant. The circus director and the assistant emphasise Han's professionalism, his educated, good manners, and his impeccable conduct. On second thought, the assistant adds that the couple had always been kind to others, but treated each other disparagingly.

In his testimony, Han confesses that he detested his wife since she gave birth to a child she had from another man (and which died soon after birth), and had contemplated the possibility of her death. Yet, although he hadn't been afraid of being sent to jail, which couldn't have been worse than his unhappy marriage, he felt too weak to commit such a crime, which he would also have considered a sin. He hadn't had any intention to kill his wife on this day, and has no explanation for the incident. Asked by the judge, Han admits freely that he felt no sorrow after his wife's death. The judge sends Han out of the room and, suddenly feeling agitated, declares him not guilty.

== Legacy ==
Han's Crime ranks, along with The Razor (Kamisori, 1910) and Seibei and his Gourds (Seibei to hyotan, 1913), as one of the stories which established Naoya's reputation as a writer.

In later years, literary historians pointed out the protagonist's rejection of an imposed moral consciousness or viewing life and identity as causal continuities, the rejection of the notion that a judgment can be other than arbitrary, the demonstration of the inability of an organised society to deal with individual truthfulness, and an influence of Friedrich Nietzsche's "superman" who defines his own morality.

== Translations ==
Han's Crime has been translated into English by Ivan Morris for the 1956 anthology Modern Japanese Literature and by Lane Dunlop for the 1987 Nayoa Shiga short story collection The Paper Door and Other Stories. It has also been translated into various other languages, including French, German and Spanish.

== Adaptations ==
Han's Crime was adapted for Japanese television as Satsui no mero (lit. "Maze of murderous intentions") in 1988.
