= Keiichiro Hirano =

Japanese novelist (born 1975)

Keiichirō Hirano
- Born: 平野啓一郎（小説家） 22 June 1975 (age 51); Gamagori, Aichi prefecture, Japan
- Website: k-hirano.com

Keiichirō Hirano (平野 啓一郎, Hirano Keiichirō; born June 22, 1975) is a Japanese novelist.

Hirano was born in Gamagori, Aichi prefecture, Japan. He published his first novel (Nisshoku, 日蝕) in 1998 and won the Akutagawa Prize the next year as one of the youngest winners ever (at 23 years of age). He graduated from the Law Department of Kyoto University in 1999. In 2005 he was nominated as a cultural ambassador and spent a year in France.

== Novels ==
- L'Eclipse (日蝕)
- Conte de la première lune (一月物語)
- The Only Form of Love (かたちだけの愛 [単行本]) 2008
- Dawn (ドーン (講談社文庫) [文庫]) 2009
- A Man (ある男 (文藝春秋)) 2018
- Other Works, Essays, Dialogues, etc.

His short story "Clear Water" (Shimizu, 清水), translated by Anthony Chambers, appears in Modern Japanese Literature, Volume 2 (Columbia University Press, 2007), pp. 542–549.

The English translation by Brent de Chene and Charles De Wolf of Nisshoku (Eclipse), published by Columbia University Press (2024), was awarded the Lindsley and Masao Miyoshi Translation Prize, Donald Keene Center of Japanese Culture at Columbia University (2025).

== Awards ==
- 120th (1998) Akutagawa Prize
- 18th (2000) Kyoto Culture Prize
- 59th (2008) Education, Science and Technology Minister’s Art Encouragement Prize for New Writers, for Dam Break
- 19th (2009) Prix Deux Magots Bunkamura, for Dawn
