= Kaizō =

Japanese general-interest magazine

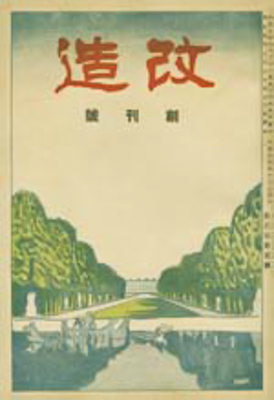
Cover of the first issue (April 1919)

Kaizō (改造 kaizō) was a Japanese general-interest magazine that started publication during the Taishō period and printed many articles of socialist content. Kaizō can be translated into English as "Reorganize", "Restructure", "Reconstruct" or "Reconstruction".

== Beginnings ==
In 1919, after World War I, Yamamoto Sanehiko's company, called Kaizōsha (改造社), began publishing Kaizō. Although it is well known for carrying works of fiction, its sales grew because of the articles it carried pertaining to labor and social problems. At this time, due to the influence of the Russian Revolution, Japanese intellectuals were also examining social issues and socialist thought. Essays by writers such as Christian socialist Kagawa Toyohiko, Marxist Kawakami Hajime, and Yamakawa Hitoshi were published and helped the magazine gain popularity. It also published Shiga Naoya's novel A Dark Night's Passing (1921–37), Riichi Yokomitsu's Shanghai (1929-1931), and Jun'ichirō Tanizaki's Quicksand (1928–30). Another popular general-interest magazine Chūōkōron (中央公論) was established before Kaizō, but sales of Kaizō overtook it despite its radical content. In 1922, Kaizōsha invited Albert Einstein to give lectures in Japan. He arrived in Japan 7 days after the Royal Swedish Academy of Sciences had announced he won the Nobel Prize. Jun Ishiwara, a Japanese theoretical physicist, summarized his lecture at Keio University and published it in Kaizō. Kaizōsha published translations of Einstein's lecture texts in Japan the next year and during the period from 1922 to 1924 it published translations of all of his papers.

== Oppression ==
In 1942, during the middle of World War II, publications printing communist essays begin to suffer government oppression (Yokohama Incident). After police beat confessions out of "Communist" staffers, Kaizō was forced to "voluntarily" dissolve in 1944. Publication was resumed in 1946, but management was poor, and labor troubles exacerbated the situation, forcing Kaizō to cease publication in 1955.

== Featured works ==
A Dark Night's Passing - by Shiga Naoya
Quicksand - by Jun'ichirō Tanizaki
Nobuko - by Miyamoto Yuriko
Kappa - by Ryūnosuke Akutagawa
The Wind Has Risen - by Hori Tatsuo
A Flock of Swirling Crows - by Kuroshima Denji
Shanghai - by Riichi Yokomitsu
