= Tan Onuma =

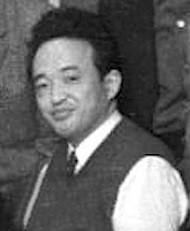
Tan Onuma

Tan Onuma (小沼 丹, Onuma Tan; September 9, 1918 - November 8, 1996) was a noted Japanese author. Onuma received his degree in English literature from Waseda University in 1942, and in 1958 became a Waseda professor in the Faculty of Letters. He received the 1969 Yomiuri Prize for Kaichūdokei and in 1989 was named a member of the Japan Art Academy.

== Sources ==
- Japanese Wikipedia article
- Jlit author information
