= Toshimasa Shimamura =

Toshimasa Shimamura (島村 利正, Shimamura Toshimasa, March 25, 1912 - November 25, 1981) was a noted Japanese author of fiction.

Shimamura was born in Nagano Prefecture, and in 1931 graduated from college with an English degree. His first book was published in 1941, and in 1943 his book 暁雲 became the first of his several candidates for the Akutagawa Prize. He founded a company in 1955 which went bankrupt in 1962, after which he took up writing full-time. Shimamura won the 1979 Yomiuri Prize for Myōkō no aki.

== English translations ==
- "Sumida River", in Seven stories of modern Japan, Leith Morton ed., Wild Peony, 1991. ISBN 978-0-9590735-9-1.

== Sources ==
- Japanese Wikipedia article
- Jlit entry
- Akutagawa Award Candidates: Shimamura Toshimasa
