= Mitsuo Nakamura =

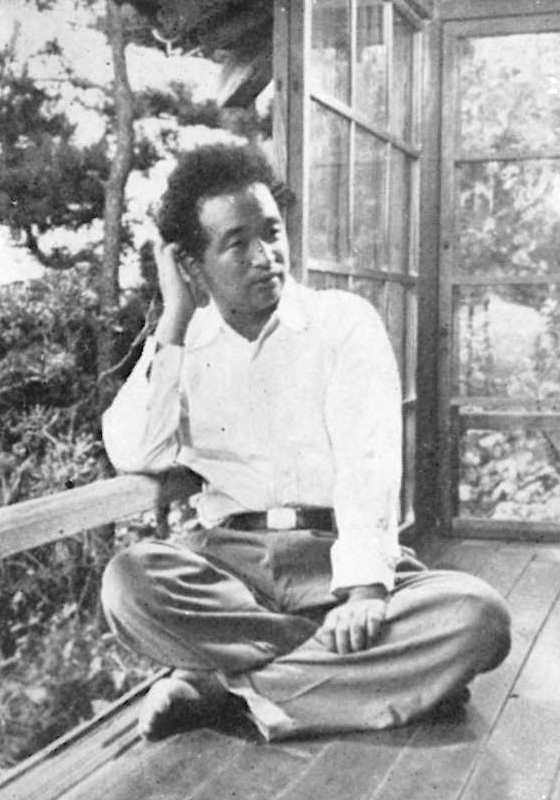
- Mitsuo Nakamura
- Born: 5 February 1911; Tokyo, Japan
- Died: 12 July 1988 (aged 77); Kamakura, Kanagawa, Japan
- Occupations: Writer and literary critic
- Writing career
- Genres: Biography, stage plays

Mitsuo Nakamura (中村 光夫, Nakamura Mitsuo; 5 February 1911 – 12 July 1988) was the pen-name of a writer of biographies and stage-plays, and a literary critic active in Shōwa period Japan. His real name was Koba Ichirō.

== Early life ==
Nakamura Mitsuo was born in Tokyo, in the plebeian district of Shitaya, (present-day Akihabara). In 1923, he attended the Tokyo Normal High School, where one of his classmates was Kaoru Ishikawa. He studied the French language while at the First Higher School, and in April 1931, he entered the Tokyo Imperial University’s Law School. He dropped out after two months, but returned the following year as a student in the Department of French Literature, where his thesis was on the works of Guy de Maupassant.

== Literary career ==
Nakamura exhibited a talent for literature at an early age, and while still a student at Tokyo Imperial University was submitting literary criticism essays to the literary journal Bungakukai ("The Literary World"). His critical study of the novelist Futabatei Shimei, published as Futabatei Shimei ron in 1936, received high acclaim, winning the 1st Ikeya Shinzaburo award, which encouraged him to devote his energies into similar critiques of contemporary Japanese and Western writers, focusing on cultural comparisons.

In 1938 he went to study at the University of Paris on the invitation of the French Government, but was forced to return to Japan the following year at the outbreak of World War II. In 1939, together with Ken'ichi Yoshida and Yamamoto Kenkichi, Nakamura co-founded the literary magazine Hihyō (批評) (literally, "Critique(s)"), which published critiques of modern French and British authors. In 1940, he briefly worked for the Foreign Ministry, and in 1941 accepted a post at Chikuma Shobo publishing company.

After the war, Nakamura was briefly an instructor at the Kamakura Academy, before accepting a post as a professor at Meiji University in 1949.

in 1950, Nakamura published Fuzoku Shosetsu Ron, in which he analyzed modern Japanese realism as expressed by Fumio Niwa and made a scathing attack against the I-Novel format which he criticized as being little more than thinly disguised autobiographies, lacking in any meaningful social commentary and removed from modern urban life and realities. In 1951, his analysis of Albert Camus brought him into direct conflict with Hirotsu Kazuo, who had different viewpoints. The following year, he won the prestigious Yomiuri Literary Prize for his critique of Jun'ichirō Tanizaki. In 1956, he became a member of the selection committee for the Akutagawa Prize.

Nakamura’s debut as a playwright was in 1957 with Hito to Okami (Man and Wolf). In 1958, he formed a literary coterie with Mishima Yukio, Ōoka Shōhei and others called the Hachi-no-ki-kai. In 1956 Nakamura had previously rejected Mishima’s The Temple of the Golden Pavilion for publication, awarding it a “minus 120 points” and accusing Mishima of a lack of morality. Nakamura won the Yomiuri Literary Prize for a second time in 1958.

In 1962, Nakamura became director of the Museum of Modern Literature in Tokyo, and taught at Kyoto University from 1963. Nakamura continued to write stage plays, including Pari Hanjoki ("Prospering in Paris") and Kiteki Issei ("Starting Whistle"), and novels, including Waga Sei no Hakusho ("Confessions of My Sexuality"), Nise no Guzo ("False Idols"), and Aru Ai ("A Certain Love"). He won the Noma Literary Prize in 1965 and Yomiuri Literary Prize for a third time in 1967, as well as the Japan Art Academy Prize the same year. He became a member of the Japan Art Academy in 1970. Nakamura announced his retirement in 1981, and was designated a Person of Cultural Merit by the Japanese government in 1982.

Nakamura began living in Kamakura, Kanagawa Prefecture from the spring of 1933. Nakamura’s sister was the wife of Kyūya Fukada. Nakamura was widowed at age 43, and his second wife, Kumiko Koba was also a playwright. Nakamura became a Roman Catholic shortly before his death in 1988 at the age of 77. His grave is at the Arai Cemetery in Sugamo, Tokyo.

== See also ==
- Japanese literature
- List of Japanese authors
