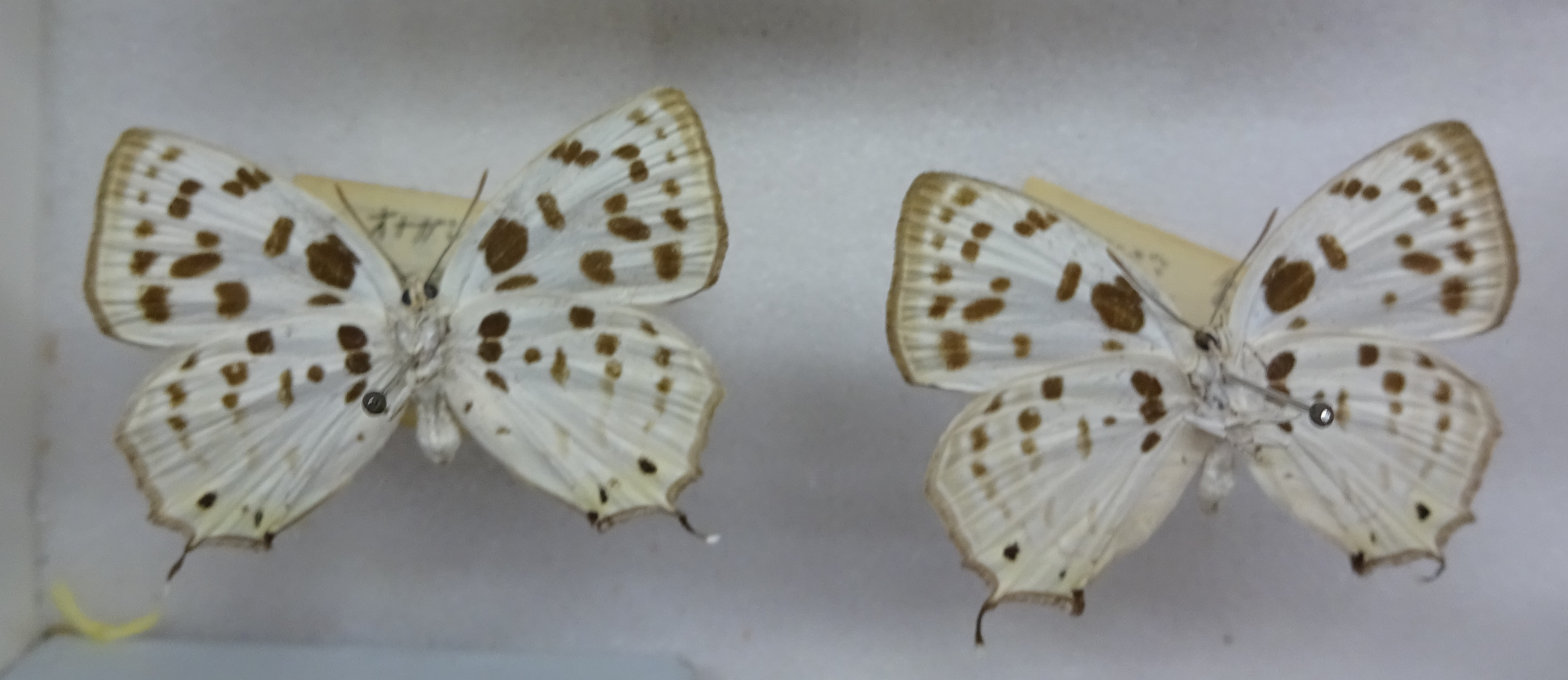
- Araragi enthea

Scientific classification
- Domain: Eukaryota
- Kingdom: Animalia
- Phylum: Arthropoda
- Class: Insecta
- Order: Lepidoptera
- Family: Lycaenidae
- Tribe: Theclini
- Genus: Araragi; Sibatani & Ito, 1942

= Araragi =

Butterfly genus in family Lycaenidae

Araragi is a genus of butterflies in the family Lycaenidae. It is a small East Asian hairstreak genus. The larvae feed on Juglans (walnut) species.

== Species ==
- Araragi enthea (Janson, 1877)
- Araragi sugiyamai Matsui, 1989
- Araragi panda Hsu & Chou, 2001
