= Tatsuo Hori =

Japanese writer (1904–1953)

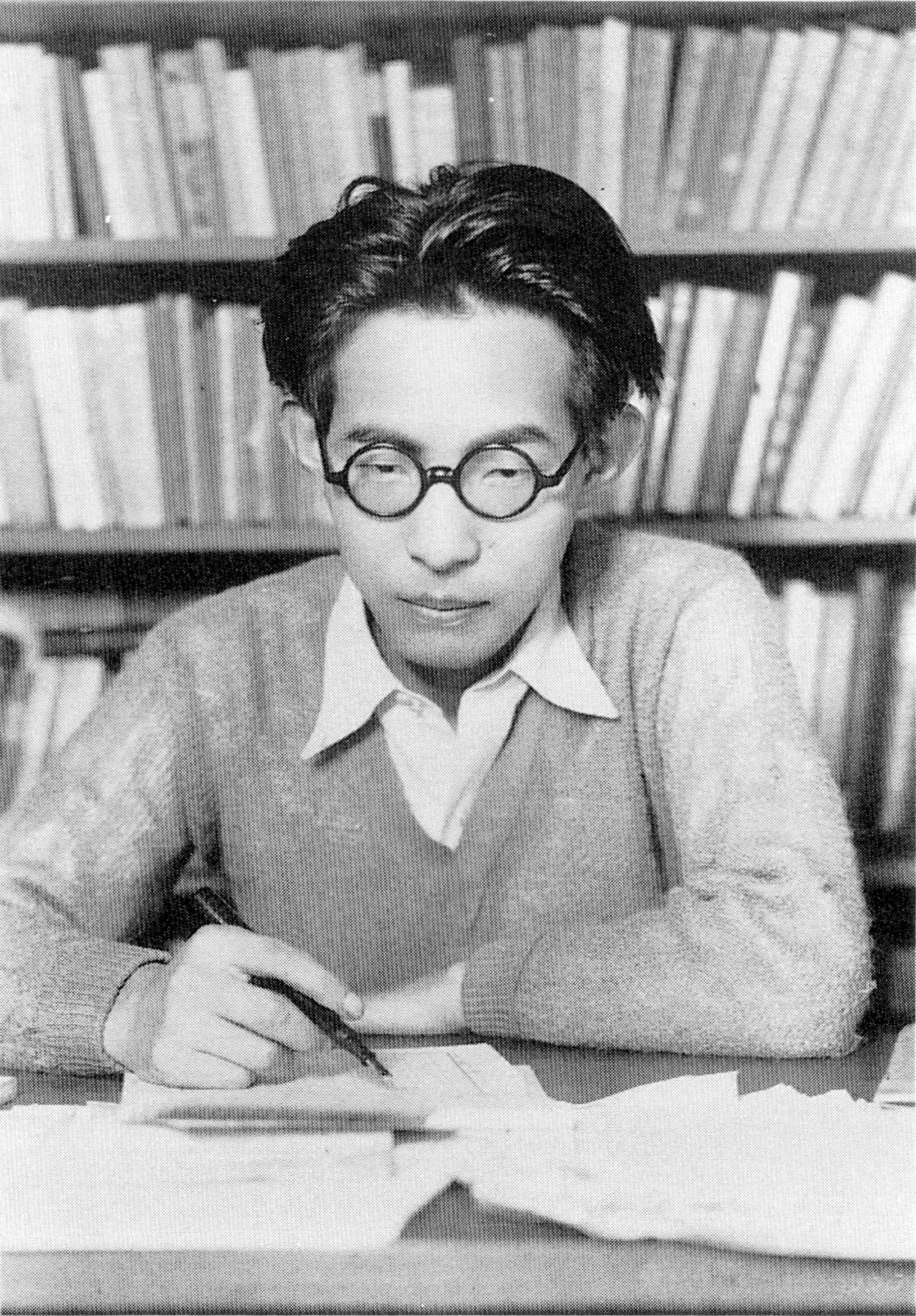
- Tatsuo Hori in 1935
- Born: 28 December 1904; Tokyo, Japan
- Died: 28 May 1953 (aged 48); Oiwake, Karuizawa, Nagano, Japan
- Education: Tokyo Imperial University
- Occupations: Writer, translator
- Spouse(s): Ayako Yano (1934–1935); Tae Kato (1938–1953)
- Writing career
- Genres: Poetry, short stories, novels
- Literary movement: Modernism, Proletarian Literature Movement

Tatsuo Hori (堀辰雄, Hori Tatsuo; 28 December 1904 – 28 May 1953) was a Japanese translator and writer of poetry, short stories and novels.

== Early life ==
Born in Tokyo, Hori studied Japanese literature at Tokyo Imperial University under Saisei Murō and Ryūnosuke Akutagawa. In addition to Japanese writers of the time, he read the works of Rainer Maria Rilke, Ivan Turgenev, Gerhart Hauptmann and Arthur Schnitzler, the French symbolists, and the philosophical writings of Arthur Schopenhauer and Friedrich Nietzsche.

While still a student, he contributed translations of modern French poets and also his own writings to the literary journal Roba, published and edited by critic Tsurujirō Kubokawa. He regarded himself as a disciple of Akutagawa, but also showed influences of Raymond Radiguet and Marcel Proust, and the Proletarian Literature Movement. His later works reflect a move towards modernism.

== Literary career ==
In 1930, Hori received recognition for his short story Sei kazoku (lit. "The Holy Family"), which was written under the impression of Akutagawa's death and even paid reference to the dead mentor in the shape of the deceased character Kuki.

Hori followed with a number of novelettes and poems, often characterized by the theme of death. During one of his regular stays in Karuizawa, Nagano, he met his future fiancée Ayako Yano, a time which he portrayed in his novel Beautiful Village. Both ill with tuberculosis, the couple moved to a sanatorium in Nagano Prefecture, which Hori used as the setting for his most famous novel, The Wind Has Risen, a fictionalised account of his fiancée's last months before her death in December 1935. In 1938, Hori married Tae Kato. Near the end of the Pacific War, he was evacuated to Oiwake, Karuizawa, where he remained until his death in 1953. Due to his deteriorating health, his literary output declined during his last years.

Hori is buried at Tama Reien cemetery in Tokyo. In his honour, the Hori Tatsuo Memorial Museum of Literature was established in Karuizawa. His widow Tae (1913–2010) served as the museum's honorary director and published many essays on her husband.

== Selected works ==
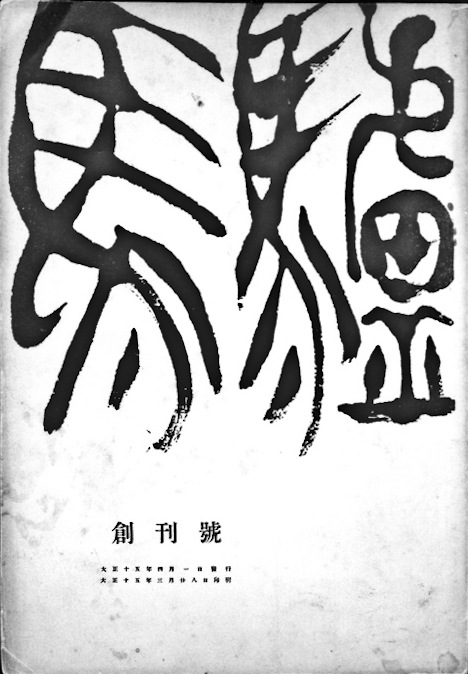
The cover of the first issue of Roba in April 1926.

- 1930: Sei kazoku (聖家族)
- 1933–34: Beautiful Village (美しい村, Utsukushii mura)
- 1936–38: The Wind Has Risen (風立ちぬ, Kaze tachinu)
- 1937: Kagerō no nikki (かげろふの日記)
- 1941: Naoko (菜穂子, Naoko)
- 1941: Arano (曠野)
- 1942: Younen jidai (幼年時代)

== Translations into English ==
- Hori, Tatsuo (1967). Selected Works of Tatsuo Hori: Beautiful Village, The Wind Awakes, Naoko. Tokyo: Sophia University.
- Hori, Tatsuo (1967). Kaze tachinu: A Japanese Novel. Translated by Kawamura, Mikio. Quebec: Westmount.
- Hori, Tatsuo (1985). "Les joues en feu". In Gessel, Van C.; Matsumoto, Tomone (eds.). The Shōwa Anthology: Modern Japanese Short Stories. Tokyo, New York: Kodansha International.
- Hori, Tatsuo (2005). "The Wind Has Risen". In Rimer, Thomas J.; Gessel, Van C. (eds.). The Columbia Anthology of Modern Japanese Literature: From Restoration to Occupation, 1868-1945. New York: Columbia University Press.
- Hori, Tatsuo (2013). "Aquarium (Suizokukan)". In Yiu, Angela (ed.). Three-dimensional Reading: Stories of Time and Space in Japanese Modernist Fiction, 1911-1932. Honolulu: University of Hawai'i Press.
