= Yamamoto Kenkichi =

Japanese writer and literary critic

Yamamoto Kenkichi (山本 健吉; 1907-1988) was the pen-name of Ishibashi Teikichi, a Japanese writer and literary critic. As a critic he wrote notable studies of Shishōsetsu as well as of the poet Kakinomoto no Hitomaro. He has been referred to as supportive of Shishōsetsu in an orthodox way.

He is mainly known as "...the mid to late twentieth century's greatest scholar of Japanese haiku and related literature. He made a particular study of the development of the system of seasonal topics and season words, and single-handedly compiled the haikai saijiki (haikai almanacs) and kiyose (season word guides). They are all still in print today and widely used by renku as well as haiku poets. (Unlike many such books, Prof. Yamamoto's guides always indicate the parts of the seasons, an important feature for renku poets.)

In Japanese scholarly publishing, senior scholars are often called upon as supervising editors over large, complex projects edited by teams of younger scholars. Among other projects, Prof. Yamamoto served in this capacity for the ground-breaking six-volume Eigo Saijiki / An English & American Literary Calendar (1968-70), which examined our literature through the lens of the Japanese season word system.

He was a senior editor on the five-volume Nihon Dai Saijiki ('Japan Great Saijiki', 1981-83), an encyclopedic, fully color-illustrated work that still sets the standard for such books. He also wrote a five-volume series called Yamamoto Kenkichi Haiku Tokuhon ('The Kenkichi Yamamoto Haiku Readers'), published posthumously. The individual volumes have titles like 'What is Haiku?', 'A Haiku Commentary Saijiki', 'The Modern Haiku Poets', 'The Heart and Laws of Haikai', and 'The Haiku Environment', each exploring its subject clearly and thoroughly."

While working on the Nihon Dai Saijiki, Prof. Kenkichi Yamamoto selected 500 season words (out of the 16,000 included) as the 'Essential Season Words'. For each of these, he wrote the main entry, describing in detail their origins and histories in the tradition. Later, he collected these same season words for the Kihon Kigo 500-Sen ('The Essential Kigo--500 Selections', 1986), which has become a classic." This selective list, "The five hundred essential Japanese season words", translated by William J. Higginson and Kris Young Kondo (also edited by Higginson, is considered a standard by western haiku researchers and poets.
