= Cha-Cha (film) =

- Directed by: Mai Sakai
- Written by: Mai Sakai
- Produced by: Yu Kato; Yuichi Shibahara
- Starring: Marika Itō; Taishi Nakagawa; Sawako Fujima; Akihisa Shiono; Stefanie Arianne; Motoki Ochiai; Shodai Fukuyama; Yuka Nakashima; Shiho Sasaki; Ryota Kobayashi; Nanoka Hara; Dan Kotaro; Yuki Kaji; Yota Kawase; Rena Matsui; Dai Ikeda; Takashi Fujii
- Cinematography: Orie Ichihashi
- Edited by: Norihiro Iwama
- Music by: Yoshitaka Fujimoto
- Production company: Dub
- Distributed by: Nagoya Broadcasting Network; Culture Publishers
- Release date: 11 October 2024
- Running time: 108 minutes
- Country: Japan
- Language: Japanese

Cha-Cha (Japanese: チャチャ) is a 2024 Japanese romantic comedy-drama film directed by Mai Sakai, starring Marika Itō and Taishi Nakagawa. It follows the titular protagonist, a free-spirited artist and illustrator, as she meets and falls in love with an introverted man. The film is the fourth instalment in the "(not) HEROINE movies" series.

== Cast ==
- Marika Itō as Cha-Cha
- Taishi Nakagawa as Raku
- Sawako Fujima as Rin
- Akihisa Shiono as Mamoru
- Stefanie Arianne as Peony
- Motoki Ochiai as Oshida
- Shodai Fukuyama as Yamada
- Yuka Nakashima as Kana
- Shiho Sasaki as Mami
- Ryota Kobayashi as Aoki
- Nanoka Hara
- Dan Kotaro as Telephone Pole
- Yuki Kaji as Yellow Flower
- Yota Kawase as Restaurant Staff
- Rena Matsui as Restaurant Staff
- Dai Ikeda as Restaurant Staff
- Takashi Fujii as Company Manager

== Production ==
The film is the fourth instalment of the "(not) HEROINE movies" series, a project which aims to have "up-and-coming actresses" with "next-generation directors" on films which depict "heroines who are clumsy but live their lives to the fullest in the present." Mai Sakai, who was set to direct, wrote the script with the help of Takamasa Oe, making this Sakai's first original work in seven years. She had chosen to write the film as she was "interested" in girls like Cha-Cha, who were "lonely and sad" despite being "well-liked." Oe, a good friend of hers who had collaborated with her previously, became involved once Sakai decided that she was unable to complete the screenplay on her own as she was busy with other projects. Though the film is a romantic comedy, Sakai reportedly included elements of psychological horror and thriller.

Actress and former J-pop idol Marika Itō was cast as the lead. A producer had recommended Itō to Sakai, after which the two met for an interview. According to Sakai, she offered Itō the role in that first interview, finding her to be "very Cha-Cha-like." Itō claimed to have auditioned for the role as she was intrigued by the script and found that there were many aspects of Cha-Cha which she related to. The film was publicly announced in May 2024. It was then announced in July that Taishi Nakagawa had been cast in the role of Raku, Cha-Cha's love interest, and that, Akihisa Shiono, Stefanie Arianne, Takashi Fujii, Motoki Ochiai, Shodai Fukuyama, Yuka Nakashima, Shiho Sasaki, Ryota Kobayashi, Nanoka Hara, Dan Kotaro, Yuki Kaji, Yota Kawase, Rena Matsui, Dai Ikeda and Sawako Fujima would also be appearing in the film.

== Release ==
As the previous films in the "(not) HEROINE movies" series, Grown-Ups, The Nighthawk's First Love and I Am What I Am, were well received, Cha-Cha was scheduled for a wider release. It premiered at the Shinjuku Piccadilly theatre in Tokyo on 24 September 2024 before opening in theatres nationwide on 11 October.

== Reception ==
Wally Adams of EasternKicks rated the film 4 stars out of 5 and wrote that the script possesses a "deceptive resourcefulness" and that it produces "cleverly meaningful/amusing dialogue and ideas out of limited, airy or even asinine situations." He considered the soundtrack to be "among the strongest and most memorable elements befitting of the title" and that it is "hard to argue the filmmakers didn’t know what they were doing" in casting Itō.

Mark Schilling of The Japan Times rated the film 3 stars out of 5 and opined that while it "puts its crimes and misdemeanors in quotation marks", the "meta framing undercuts whatever tension the plot was trying to build." He further argued that the kidnapping subplot "strains credibility" and called Arianne "underused". However, he praised Itō, feeling that she was relatable and a "believable mix of contradictions".
