= Munō no Taka =

Japanese manga series

- First tankōbon volume cover

無能の鷹
- Genre: Comedy
- Manga
- Written by: Asami Hanzaki
- Published by: Kodansha
- Imprint: KC Kiss
- Magazine: Kiss
- Original run: June 25, 2019 – September 25, 2024
- Volumes: 8
- Television drama

Talentless Takano
- Directed by: Yoshiaki Murao; Takayoshi Tanazawa; Yuki Takahashi
- Produced by: Airi Kijima; Tatsuya Hongō
- Written by: Nonji Nemoto
- Music by: Masato Suzuki
- Studio: TV Asahi; MMJ
- Licensed by: Netflix
- Original network: TV Asahi
- Original run: October 11, 2024 – November 29, 2024
- Episodes: 8

Munō no Taka (無能の鷹) is a Japanese manga series written and illustrated by Asami Hanzaki. It was serialized in Kodansha's josei manga magazine Kiss betweeen June 2019 and September 2024. A live-action television drama adaptation aired on TV Asahi between October and November 2024.

== Synopsis ==
While on a job search, Hiwada meets a woman named Tsumeko Takano, who gives off an aura of competence, but is in reality incompetent. They both end up working for the same company, then a year passes and Hiwada has become more confident, but Takano is still the same person as she began.

== Characters ==
Tsumeko Takano (鷹野ツメ子, Takano Tsumeko)
Portrayed by: Nanao
Michito Hiwada (鶸田道人, Hiwada Michito)
Portrayed by: Akihisa Shiono
Akane Ukai (鵜飼朱音, Ukai Akane)
Portrayed by: Honami Sato
Kōta Kijitani (雉谷耕太, Kijitani Kōta)
Portrayed by: Asuka Kudo
Mataichirō Suzaku (朱雀又一郎, Suzaki Mataichirō)
Portrayed by: Katsumi Takahashi
Itsuki Hatoyama (鳩山樹, Hatoyama Itsuki)
Portrayed by: Arata Iura

== Media ==
=== Manga ===
Written and illustrated by Asami Hanzaki, Munō no Taka was serialized in Kodansha's josei manga magazine Kiss from June 25, 2019, to September 25, 2024. Its chapters were collected in eight tankōbon volumes released from April 13, 2020, to October 11, 2024.

No.	Release date	ISBN
1	April 13, 2020	978-4-06-519230-6
2	October 13, 2020	978-4-06-521125-0
3	May 13, 2021	978-4-06-521542-5
4	January 13, 2022	978-4-06-526506-2
5	September 13, 2022	978-4-06-529051-4
6	May 12, 2023	978-4-06-531440-1
7	January 12, 2024	978-4-06-534419-4
8	October 11, 2024	978-4-06-537208-1

=== Drama ===
A live-action television drama adaptation aired on TV Asahi from October 11, to November 29, 2024. The drama featured Nanao, Akihisa Shiono, Arata Iura, Asuka Kudo, among others. The drama is streamed in North America under the title Talentless Takano on Netflix.

== Reception ==
The series, alongside The Unwomanly Face of War, was ranked eleventh in the 2021 edition of Takarajimasha's Kono Manga ga Sugoi! guidebook's list of the best manga for female readers. The series was ranked third in the Nationwide Publishers Recommended Comics of 2022 list.
