= Tomoko Yonezu =

Japanese human rights activist (born 1948)

- 米津知子
- Born: 1948 (age 77–78); Tokyo, Japan
- Education: Tama Art University
- Occupation: Disability rights activist
- Years active: 1969–present
- Organization(s): Thought Group S.E.X. Ribu Shinkuju Centre; SOSHIREN
- Criminal charges: Misdemeanour
- Criminal penalty: Fine

Tomoko Yonezu (Japanese: 米津知子, romanized: Yonezu Tomoko; born 1948) is a Japanese human rights activist. A key member of ūman ribu, the women's liberation movement in Japan, she advocated for intersectionality within the movement to involve the rights of women with disabilities during the 1970s and 1980s.

== Early life ==
Yonezu was born in 1948. She contracted polio while living in Tokyo in 1951, which left her right leg paralysed, requiring the use of a leg brace in order to walk. Yonezu later described herself as being seen as a "burdensome child" by some members of her family. While she did not attain good grades at school, she went on to study design at Tama Art University in 1968.

== Activism ==
=== Student protests ===
In January 1969, Yonezu joined student protests against the planned relocation of Tama Art University from Kaminoge to Hachiōji. This prompted her to join the Artists Joint Struggle Committee (bijutsuka kyōtō kaigi, Bikyōtō), a student group focused on challenging the "institutionalised nature of the art world". While participating in a barricade, she noticed that while male students were taking a leading role in the protests, including giving speeches, women were expected to complete more supportive tasks; Yonezu, for example, was responsible for cleaning toilets. She later expressed frustration at the sidelining of women in the protest movement and the lack of male solidarity for issues experienced by women in Japanese society.

=== Emergence of the ūman ribu movement ===
On 2 April 1970, Yonezu was one of the co-founders of the women-only organisation Thought Group S.E.X. (思想集団エス・イー・エックス, Shisō shūdan Esu ī ekkusu), made up of female students from Tama Art University. The group's first public appearance was on 26 April 1970, when they stormed the stage at a Bikyōtō rally, interrupting speeches to introduce the group while wearing white helmets with "S.E.X." written on them. Disrupting political events subsequently became a feature of the group's activism.

On 14 November 1970, Yonezu was one of the organisers of the first major women-only gathering in Japan as part of the ūman ribu movement; around 200 women attended the meeting, held in Shibuya. Yonezu took to wearing t-shirts to public gatherings and demonstrations with "LOOK AT ME" written on them, garnering press attention and making her one of the more visible activists in the ūman ribu movement.

In May 1972, the first ūman ribu conference was held in Tokyo with around 2000 participants. Its success led to the establishment of the Ribu Shinkuju Centre (リブ新宿センター) on 30 September 1972, a physical base for the movement, which Yonezu and several other activists moved into. Yonezu worked several jobs during her time at the centre, including in the food section of a department store and as a toll booth worker at a restaurant car park.

=== Intersection with the disability rights movement ===
Yonezu's presence as a woman with disabilities at the forefront of the ūman ribu movement has been accredited to it developing overtime a more intersectional approach to women's issues; she considered the government's attempts to control the population by controlling access to abortion infringed on the rights of women to bodily autonomy and disabled people to life. In 1973, the Japanese government announced plans to revise the Eugenic Protection Law, which had permitted abortion on the grounds of economic hardship; the proposed revision included removing the "economic reasons clause", while adding a "foetal clause" that would permit abortion based on diagnosed foetal abnormalities. The ūman ribu movement initially focused its activism primarily on preventing the removal of the economic reasons clause with little attention paid to the proposed foetal clause. Yonezu feared that the latter clause, if added, would lead to people with disabilities "no longer existing", and worked to encourage the movement to campaign against the foetal clause alongside its support of the economic reasons clause.

As part of the campaign, Yonezu worked to improve relationships between the ūman ribu movement and the disability rights movement, the latter of which was reluctant to work with the women's liberation movement due to a belief that its members would likely choose to abort a foetus with abnormalities. Yonezu was able to spearhead the movement to publicly express its support for people with disabilities; she also facilitated disability rights groups such as Aoi shiba no kai to facilitate training on discrimination against people with disabilities at the Ribu Shinkuju Centre. The government ultimately shelved plans to reform the Eugenic Protection Law.

Yonezu's activism for the rights of people with disabilities continued after the successful campaign against the revision of the Eugenic Protection Law. On 20 April 1974, she received national attention after spraying the Mona Lisa with red paint during the first day of its exhibition at the Tokyo National Museum while shouting "you are excluding the disabled! Show the Mona Lisa to everyone! The Mona Lisa is crying because she is witnessing such wrongful discrimination!". Yonezu's protest was centred on the museum's decision to restrict access for visitors requiring assistance, including people with physical disabilities, to one day a week. Yonezu was arrested and detained for a month; she was eventually charged with a misdemeanour and fined 3000 JPY in June 1975.

=== Closure of the Ribu Shinjuku Centre and subsequent activism ===
The ūman ribi movement formally dispersed in May 1977 when the Ribu Shinjuku Centre closed. Shortly afterwards, Yonezu was diagnosed with atrial septal defect and was forced to return to living with her parents due to her ill health. In 1982, it was publicly announced that the Japanese government was reconsidering plans to reform the Eugenic Protection Law, which led to Yonezu resuming her role as an activist, making and distributing a popular pamphlet, and co-forming the activist network '82 Liaison Group to Block the Revision of the Protection Law (82 Yūsei Hogohō kaiaku soshi renrakukai). The campaign called for the Eugenic Protection Law to be left unrevised. In 1983, after the government shelved plans to reform the law, the group renamed itself as SOSHIREN - From my Body, from Women's Bodies (SOSHIREN 女（わたし）のからだから メンバー, SOSHIREN - On'na (watashi) no karada kara menbā).

== Recognition ==
Yonezu is mentioned in the novella Hunchback by Saou Ichikawa, where the main character, a disabled women, considers writing her dissertation on Yonezu.
