= My Beautiful Man =

Japanese light novel series and its adaptations

- Cover of the Japanese version of vol. 1

美しい彼 (Utsukushii Kare)
- Genre: Boys' love
- Light novel
- Written by: Yuu Nagira
- Illustrated by: Rikako Kasai
- Published by: Tokuma Shoten
- English publisher: NA: Tokyopop
- Imprint: Chara Bunko
- Original run: December 19, 2014 – present
- Volumes: 4 + 1 side story
- Television drama
- Directed by: Mai Sakai
- Written by: Fumi Tsubota
- Music by: Yoshitaka Fujimoto
- Studio: C & I Entertainment
- Licensed by: GagaOOLala; Rakuten Viki
- Original network: MBS (season 1-2); TBS (season 2)
- Original run: November 19, 2021 – February 28, 2023
- Episodes: 10
- Live-action film

My Beautiful Man: Eternal
- Directed by: Mai Sakai
- Written by: Fumi Tsubota
- Music by: Yoshitaka Fujimoto
- Studio: C & I Entertainment
- Licensed by: Rakuten Viki
- Released: April 7, 2023
- Manga
- Written by: Yuu Nagira
- Illustrated by: Megumi Kitano
- Published by: Tokuma Shoten
- English publisher: NA: Tokyopop
- Imprint: Chara Comics Collection
- Magazine: Chara
- Original run: December 22, 2021 – present
- Volumes: 6

My Beautiful Man (Japanese: 美しい彼, Hepburn: Utsukushii Kare) is a Japanese light novel series by Yuu Nagira. It is published by Tokuma Shoten with illustrations by Rikako Kasai. My Beautiful Man was published as Nagira's debut work, and since 2014, there have been four volumes published, as well as one side story.

A live-action television drama adaptation starring Riku Hagiwara and Yusei Yagi was broadcast from November 19, 2021, to December 24, 2021, on MBS as part of the programming block Drama Tokku. A second season was broadcast from February 8, 2023, to March 1, 2023, on MBS and TBS as part of the programming block Dramaism, and its conclusion was released as a theatrical film titled My Beautiful Man: Eternal on April 7, 2023. The television drama series was critically acclaimed, with Hagiwara and Yagi winning the My Best TV Prize Grand Prix Award at the 59th and 60th Galaxy Awards for their performances in both seasons.

My Beautiful Man was also adapted into a manga series by Megumi Kitano, which is serialized in the bimonthly boys' love manga magazine Chara.

== Plot ==
Since childhood, Kazunari Hira has had a stuttering speech disorder that has led him to become ostracized by his classmates. On his first day of school, Hira immediately becomes bullied, but he also meets Sou Kiyoi, a boy in his class who, despite his brutally honest personality, instantly becomes popular. Hira becomes fascinated by Kiyoi's beauty and charismatic presence, viewing him as the "king" of his class.

== Characters ==
Kazunari Hira (平良 一成, Hira Kazunari)
Voiced by: Yūki Ono
Portrayed by: Riku Hagiwara
Hira grew up with a stutter and has struggled to get along with others since childhood. His behavior is described as creepy. He falls in love at first sight with Kiyoi.
Sou Kiyoi (清居 奏, Kiyoi Sō)
Voiced by: Soma Saito
Portrayed by: Yusei Yagi
Kiyoi is Hira's classmate in high school, who Hira views as his "king." A popular student, Kiyoi has a cold personality. As a child, Kiyoi lived with his mother and had a lonely childhood, often spending time at home alone. Kiyoi is initially disgusted at Hira's attention, but he is unable to leave him alone and becomes interested in him.
Kazuki Koyama (小山 和希, Koyama Kazuki)
Voiced by: Shun Horie
Portrayed by: Akira Takano
Koyama attends the same university as Hira and is part of the same photography club as him. He falls in love with Hira. During their fourth year of university, he becomes the president of the photography club.
Anna (安奈)
Voiced by: Akiha Matsui
Portrayed by: Sawa Nimura
Anna is a 23-year-old actress from Kiyoi's talent agency who has garnered universal acclaim for her acting. She is a friend of his and acts as his confidant.
Hiromi Noguchi (野口 大海, Noguchi Hiromi)
Voiced by: Toshiyuki Morikawa
Portrayed by: Soko Wada
Noguchi is a highly-sought photographer in the entertainment industry. He hires Hira as his assistant after seeing his photos. He has high communication skills and an eye for detail.
Shirota (城田)
Voiced by: Yu Miyazaki
Portrayed by: Yuto Tsubone
Shitara is Hira and Kiyoi's classmate who mainly bullies Hira.
Katsumi Shitara (設楽 克己, Shitara Katsumi)
Voiced by: Takuya Masumoto
Portrayed by: Motoki Ochiai
Shitara is a 32-year-old man and a huge fan of Anna. He initially befriends Hira for understanding his passion as her fan.

== Media ==
=== Novels ===
My Beautiful Man is written by Yuu Nagira as her debut work. It is published by Tokuma Shoten under the Chara Bunko imprint, with Rikako Kasai providing the illustrations. Following the novels' initial releases, Nagira continued the series, which is serialized in the bimonthly magazine Shosetsu Chara beginning with the magazine's vol. 41 released on November 22, 2019.

In a 2021 interview with Da Vinci, Nagira stated that she and her editors had expected My Beautiful Man to end in only one volume. Nagira expressed surprise at how well-received Hira was as a character because of his "creepy" personality, as she had assumed readers of the boys' love genre preferred characters and settings that "reflected their desires." Nagira also stated that because of how well-received Hira was to her audience, she was able to subvert other boys' love tropes, particularly with how Kiyoi gains 20 kg. for a movie role in the third volume. While Hira was written to be "creepy", Nagira felt that the readers of the BL genre were able to sympathize with him because they understood the feeling of supporting idols.

Tokyopop licensed the novels for English-language distribution in North America as part of their LoveLove imprint.

No.	Title	Original release date	English release date
1	My Beautiful Man; Utsukushii Kare (美しい彼)	December 19, 2014; 9784199007804	July 16, 2024; 9781427875464
2	My Hateful Man; Nikurashii Kare (憎らしい彼)	December 16, 2016; 9784199008610	October 15, 2024; 9781427875556
3	My Troublesome Man; Nayamashii Kare (悩ましい彼)	July 31, 2019; 9784199009600	December 17, 2024; 9781427877543
Side story	My Beautiful Man: Interlude; Interlude: Utsukushii Kare Bangai-hen Shū (interlude 美しい彼番外編集)	September 28, 2021; 9784199010415	August 12, 2025; 9781427880871
4	My Uncontrollable Man; Mamanaranai Kare (儘ならない彼)	October 25, 2024; 9784199011450	July 21, 2026; 9781427888082

=== Audio drama ===
Ginger Records released a series of audio dramas on CD adapting each volume of the novel. The CD drama stars Yūki Ono as Kazunari Hira, Soma Saito as Sou Kiyoi, Yu Miyazaki as Shirota, Shun Horie as Kazuki Koyama, Toshiyuki Morikawa as Hiromi Noguchi, Shinichiro Miki as Hideki Ueda. The first volume was released on June 28, 2019. The second volume was released on July 23, 2021. A special version of the CD included a bonus CD adapting the chapter "Moon Age 14." The third volume was released on April 21, 2023, and peaked at no. 34 on the Oricon Weekly Albums Chart on its first week of release.

For their roles, Ono wanted to express Hira with "delicacy and detail", stating that he consulted the sound director about Hira's stuttering. Saito described that there was a "gap" between how Hira views Kiyoi and Kiyoi's true self, so he took care to portray the balance between them. Horie stated he paid attention in portraying Koyama's "human side", particularly in the scene where he cries because he is in love with Hira.

=== Television drama ===
On October 12, 2021, a live-action television drama series adaptation was announced. The series was broadcast for 6 episodes from November 19, 2021, (Note: MBS lists the broadcast date as November 18, 2021, at 24:59, which is November 19, 2021, at 12:29 a.m.) to June 15, 2023, on MBS on their programming block Drama Tokku. Additional broadcasts include TV Kanagawa, Chiba TV, Tochigi TV, TV Saitama, and Gunma TV. It was streamed internationally with English subtitles on GagaOOLala.

The adaptation starred Riku Hagiwara as Kazunari Hira and Fantastics from Exile Tribe member Yusei Yagi as Sou Kiyoi. Nagira praised the cast in a 2021 interview, stating that she was initially concerned as she felt the success of the drama adaptation depended on the actor cast for Kiyoi. She also speculated that the "deciding factor" for Riku Hagiwara being cast as Hira may have been his eyes. Hagiwara focused on conveying his feelings through his eyes and facial expressions, and Yagi consciously tried to focus on having "beautiful" behavior, finding it difficult to portray the change in Kiyoi after meeting Hira. Yagi described Kiyoi as a "princess" and portrayed the character with the "spirit of, 'Hira, you come to me'" rather than changing himself to match Hira's pace.

The supporting cast includes Akira Takano as Kazuki Koyama, Yuto Tsubone as Shirota, Kento Sakurai as Miki, Momoka as Momo, Aya Marsh as Shima, and Shuri Nakamura as Kurata. On December 3, 2021, for the "university arc", Wataru Kuriyama was cast as Yohei Koyama and Toshiyuki Someya was cast as Iruma. The series is directed by Mai Sakai, with Fumi Tsubota in charge of the script. The opening theme song is "Caramel" by Mosawo and the ending theme song is "Follow" by Rosu. The drama adaptation has several parts changed from the original novel.

My Beautiful Man was renewed for a second season, which was broadcast from February 7, 2023, to February 28, 2023, for a total of 4 episodes. It was broadcast on MBS as part of the programming block Dramaism as well as TBS. Additional broadcasts include TBS, HBC, TUT, and RKB. Mai Sakai and Fumi Tsubota returned to direct and write for the series respectively. The original cast reprised their roles, and the new supporting cast included Motoki Ochiai as Katsumi Shitara, Sawa Nimura as Anna, and Soko Wada as Hiromi Noguchi. On March 1, 2023, Kentaro Maeda and Dai Ikeda were added to the cast as Kiriya Kiritani and Koda, respectively. The opening theme song is "Bitter" by Rosu, and the ending theme song is "Kinmokusei" by Mosawo. Rosu stated that they wrote "Bitter" from Hira's perspective, while Mosawo wrote "Kinmokusei" from Kiyoi's perspective.

==== Season 1 (2021) ====
No.	Title	Directed by	Written by	Original release date
1	"Episode 1"; Transliteration: "Dai-ichi-wa" (Japanese: 第1話)	Mai Sakai	Fumi Tsubota	November 19, 2021
Hira, a loner throughout childhood due to his stuttering, instantly falls in love with Kiyoi on his first day of school. While Kiyoi becomes one of the most popular boys in his class, Hira is forced to become an errand boy for them. Despite Kiyoi's cold behavior and disgust towards Hira for constantly staring at him, he stops the other boys in class from taking advantage of him and also pays extra when covering their expenses, to which Hira saves in a beaker. A few months later, Kiyoi enters a modeling competition in a magazine, and Hira learns that he is secretly taking dance lessons to prepare for it. Hira promises Kiyoi that he will keep it a secret.
2	"Episode 2"; Transliteration: "Dai-ni-wa" (Japanese: 第2話)	Mai Sakai	Fumi Tsubota	November 26, 2021
As summer approaches, the boys decide to spend a day at Hira's house. Kiyoi learns about Hira's photography hobby and asks him to help take photos of himself for the modeling contest. The boys suddenly invite their female classmates to light sparklers and force Hira to buy snacks for them, but Kiyoi joins him. The two get in trouble by a policeman for riding on the same bicycle and serve detention together at school. At night, Kiyoi stays at Hira's house, and, awed by his beauty, Hira instinctively takes a photo of him.
3	"Episode 3"; Transliteration: "Dai-san-wa" (Japanese: 第3話)	Mai Sakai	Fumi Tsubota	December 3, 2021
Kiyoi loses the modeling competition, and despite his aloofness, he lashes out at Hira when the latter tries to comfort him, leading to Hira confessing his feelings for him. At school, Shirota assumes that Kiyoi's fame has made him arrogant, and the whole class turns on him. When Shirota and his friends pour tomato juice on him, an enraged Hira beats up Shirota. This leads to Hira and Kiyoi growing closer, and they meet in secret for Hira to take photos of him. When they graduate from high school, Kiyoi kisses Hira and leaves, to which Hira interprets as a farewell.
4	"Episode 4"; Transliteration: "Dai-yon-wa" (Japanese: 第4話)	Mai Sakai	Fumi Tsubota	December 10, 2021
Now a university student, Hira has cut contact from Kiyoi and joined a photography club. One day, his friend and member of the same club, Koyama, confesses to him that he is love with him, and Hira agrees to attend a stage play for his birthday. Kiyoi makes a surprise appearance, causing Hira's feelings for him to reawaken. He begins attending Kiyoi's stage plays, and after the play's wrap-up party, Kiyoi confronts him about his relationship with Koyama. The next day, Hira agrees to let Kiyoi come to his house to practice his lines, but he is also asked by the photography club to take care of a sick Koyama.
5	"Episode 5"; Transliteration: "Dai-go-wa" (Japanese: 第5話)	Mai Sakai	Fumi Tsubota	December 17, 2021
Kiyoi reflects on his first meeting with Hira and how his interest in him had grown over time. He grows frustrated that Hira does not realize he reciprocates his feelings, nor will he act on his feelings for him. Kiyoi arrives at Hira's house in time to see Koyama embracing Hira and leaves. Afterwards, Hira admits to Koyama that he is still in love with Kiyoi and rejects him.
6	"Episode 6"; Transliteration: "Dai-roku-wa" (Japanese: 第6話)	Mai Sakai	Fumi Tsubota	December 24, 2021
Kiyoi becomes angry at Hira's reluctance to acknowledge his feelings for him. As the distance between them grows, Hira makes a final call to Kiyoi, stating that he will wait for him at their high school before giving up on him. After confronting each other, Kiyoi admits to Hira that he is in love with him and is frustrated that he sees him only as a "king." Reaching a resolution, the two become a couple.

==== Season 2 (2023) ====
No.	Title	Directed by	Written by	Original release date
1	"Episode 1"; Transliteration: "Dai-ichi-wa" (Japanese: 第1話)	Mai Sakai	Fumi Tsubota	February 7, 2023
Hira is now in his final year of university, while Kiyoi has made strides in his acting career. Kiyoi invites Hira to a party held by other celebrities and gives him a makeover, with Hira feeling insecure about their social standing. At the party, Hira becomes popular with some of the female celebrities, causing Kiyoi to get jealous and leave with him. However, Hira affirms that he will only take photos of Kiyoi.
2	"Episode 2"; Transliteration: "Dai-ni-wa" (Japanese: 第2話)	Mai Sakai	Fumi Tsubota	February 14, 2023
As Kiyoi's popularity continues to rise after co-starring in a drama with Anna, a popular actress from his talent agency, Hira decides to search for a part-time job to make himself more worthy of him. Hira is encouraged to enter a photography contest held by famed photographer Hiromi Noguchi, but he feels he is not good enough. Kiyoi becomes jealous when he learns Hira had sought Koyama for advice, but he makes him dinner and pushes him to enter the contest, to which Hira decides to do so.
3	"Episode 3"; Transliteration: "Dai-san-wa" (Japanese: 第3話)	Mai Sakai	Fumi Tsubota	February 21, 2023
Hira loses the photography competition, but Koyama suggests he can use his brother's connections to meet with Noguchi directly. Meanwhile, Kiyoi encourages Hira to try out for the prestigious Ihei Nomura Photo Contest. At home, Hira gets a surprise visit from his cousin Naho, who is moving back into the house due to her divorce. Kiyoi becomes upset when Hira reveals he doesn't plan on telling his family about their relationship as he feels their social standing is too different.
4	"Episode 4"; Transliteration: "Dai-yon-wa" (Japanese: 第4話)	Mai Sakai	Fumi Tsubota	February 28, 2023
Hira and Kiyoi make up the next morning and attend Shirota and Kurata's wedding party. The party, as well as Kiyoi's encouragement, inspires Hira to move forward. Koyama informs Hira that Noguchi is interested in meeting him after seeing his photos. When Hira arrives at his studio, Noguchi states that he is impressed with Hira's photos and hires him as his assistant for Anna's photobook shoot.

=== Film ===
On November 19, 2022, a live-action film adaptation titled My Beautiful Man: Eternal (劇場版 美しい彼 ～eternal～, Gekijōban Utsukushii Kare: Eternal) was announced for a theatrical release on April 7, 2023, nationwide in Japan. It was created as a continuation of season 2 of the television series. Mai Sakai and Fumi Tsubota returned as director and scriptwriter of the film respectively. The theme songs for the film were the same as season 2: "Bitter" by Rosu; and "Kinmokusei" by Mosawo. Filming for the movie concluded on November 5, 2022.

The first season was re-released as a film titled My Beautiful Man: Special Edit Version (美しい彼 special edit version, Utsukushii Kare: Special Edit Version) that was screened in 21 of Toho's theaters beginning on March 10, 2023, to promote the release of the sequel film My Beautiful Man: Eternal.

My Beautiful Man: Eternal debuted at no. 3 in the Japanese box office, and within the first three days, it grossed ¥137,000,000 with 97,000 people in attendance. Advanced screenings from March 24 to March 27 added an additional ¥5,000,000 gross and 2,000 people in attendance.

=== Manga ===
A manga adaptation of My Beautiful Man is illustrated by Megumi Kitano. It is serialized in the bimonthly boys' love manga magazine Chara beginning with the February 2022 issue released on December 22, 2021. The chapters were later released in five bound volumes by Tokuma Shoten under the Chara Comics Collection imprint.

Tokyopop licensed the manga adaptation for English-language distribution in North America as part of their LoveLove imprint. The volumes are translated by Katie Kimura.

No.	Original release date	Original ISBN	English release date	English ISBN
1	June 24, 2022	9784199609107	July 16, 2024	9781427877550
2	February 25, 2023	9784199609343	October 15, 2024	9781427878120
3	October 25, 2023	9784199609626	March 4, 2025	9781427878502
4	June 25, 2024	9784199609930	May 6, 2025	9781427881069
5	June 25, 2025	9784199610387	December 8, 2026	9781427890887
6	March 25, 2026	9784199610769	March 9, 2027	9781427891075

== Reception ==
=== Novels ===
My Beautiful Man sold a cumulative total of 700,000 copies as of 2023. It won Best Novel at the 6th Chil Chil BL Awards in 2015. In 2022, for the 13th Chil Chil BL Awards, Interlude won Best Novel, while Hira and Kiyoi won Best Seme and Best Uke respectively.

=== Television drama and film ===
The Television reviewed the live-action television drama series favorably, praising the casting of the main characters and the depiction of several iconic scenes from the novel, despite that the drama adaptation changed several parts from the original novel. The popularity of live-action television drama series in Asia led to Oricon describing the phenomenon as the "HiraKiyo" movement. On the streaming service GagaOOLala, the second season ranked 4th place in annual viewership for the year of 2023.

My Beautiful Man won Best Video at the 13th BL Awards in 2022. Riku Hagiwara and Yusei Yagi won the 16th Grand Prix My Best TV Award at the 59th Galaxy Award, the Zaihan Broadcasting's Grand Prix Award, and the Hot Actor Pair Award from the Weibo Account Festival 2022 for their performances. Hagiwara and Yagi won the 17th Grand Prix My Best TV Award at the 60th Galaxy Award for their performance again in the second season. Hagiwara was awarded the Outstanding Breakthrough Star Award at the Weibo Account Festival 2022. Yagi was awarded Outstanding Newcomer Actor at the Weibo Account Festival 2022 and Outstanding Asian Star in the 2022 Seoul International Drama Awards for his performance. He was awarded the same prize for the 2023 Seoul International Drama Awards for his performance in the show's second season, For the film sequel, My Beautiful Man: Eternal, he was awarded the Tsutaya Discs Film Fan Award at the 78th Mainichi Film Awards in 2024.

=== Manga ===
Otaku USA praised the artwork for the manga adaptation, stating that the angles of "bullying and loneliness" gave the story an "empathetic, reflective feel" and matched the "pensive mood" of the story.
