= Polly Barton (author) =

British translator and writer

- Born: London, England
- Education: University of Cambridge; SOAS University of London
- Occupations: Translator and writer
- Awards: English PEN Translates award, 2020

Polly Barton is a British writer and translator of Japanese to English. She is the author of two non-fiction books, Fifty Sounds and Porn: An Oral History. What Am I, A Deer? is her debut novel. She has translated numerous titles of Japanese literature and non-fiction. Her translations have been featured in Granta, Catapult, and The White Review, and in 2019 she won the Fitzcarraldo Editions Essay Prize for her non-fiction debut, Fifty Sounds.

== Life and career ==
Born and raised in west London, England, Barton studied philosophy at the University of Cambridge. She travelled to Japan to teach English as part of the JET Program. She also holds an MA degree in the Theory and Practice of Translation from SOAS University of London.

In 2025, Barton founded the festival Translated By, Bristol, which celebrates translation and translated literature.

== Bibliography ==
=== Essays ===
- Fifty Sounds (Fitzcarraldo Editions, 2021)
- Porn: An Oral History (Fitzcarraldo Editions, 2023)

=== Fiction ===
- What Am I, A Deer? (Fitzcarraldo Editions, 2026)

=== Translations ===
- Spring Garden – novella by Tomoka Shibasaki (Pushkin Press, 2017)
- Friendship for Grown-Ups – chapbook by Nao-Cola Yamazaki (Strangers Press, 2017)
- Mikumari – chapbook by Misumi Kubo (Strangers Press, 2017)
- There's No Such Thing as an Easy Job – novel by Kikuko Tsumura (Bloomsbury, 2020)
- Where the Wild Ladies Are – short story collection by Aoko Matsuda (Tilted Axis Press, 2020)
- So We Look to the Sky – novel by Misumi Kubo (Arcade Publishing, 2021)
- Mild Vertigo – novel by Mieko Kanai (Fitzcarraldo Editions, 2023)
- Butter – novel by Asako Yuzuki (Fourth Estate, 2024)
- Hunchback – novella by Saou Ichikawa (Viking Press, 2025)
- The Woman Dies – short story collection by Aoko Matsuda (Europa Editions, 2025)
- Hooked – novel by Asako Yuzuki (Fourth Estate, 2026)

== Awards and honours ==
- Winner of English PEN Translates award 2020, for translating There’s No Such Thing as an Easy Job.
- Longlisted for the 2022 Ondaatje Prize for Fifty Sounds.
- Shortlisted for the 2022 Edward Stanford Travel Writing Award for Fifty Sounds.
- Longlisted for the 2025 International Booker Prize for translating Hunchback
- Shortlisted for the 2026 Goldsmiths Prize for What Am I, A Deer?.
