= Asako Yuzuki =

Japanese writer

- 柚木 麻子
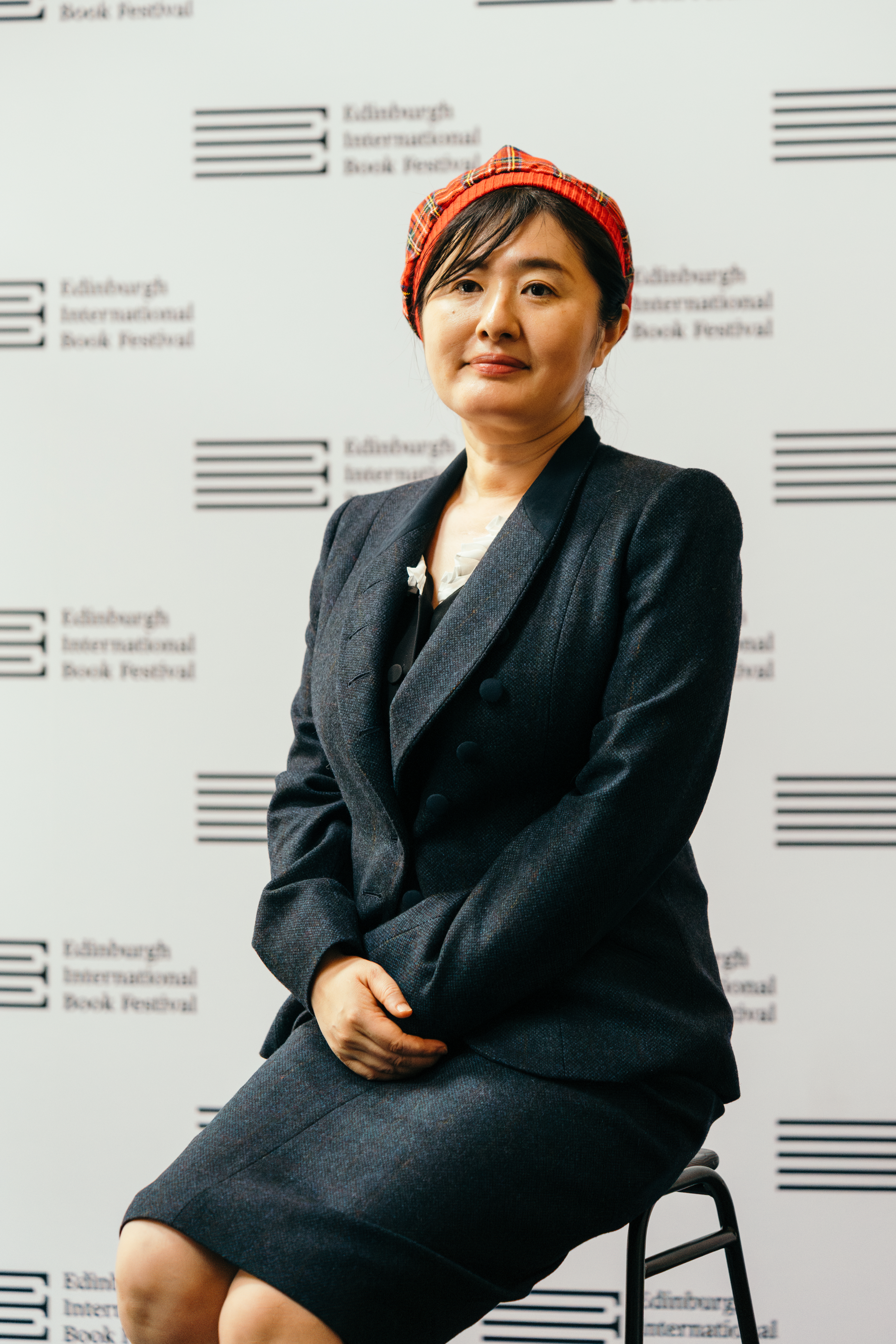
- Yuzuki at the 2025 Edinburgh International Book Festival
- Born: August 2, 1981 (age 45); Tokyo, Japan
- Education: Rikkyo University
- Occupation: Writer
- Writing career
- Language: Japanese
- Genre: Fiction
- Notable works: Nageki no bijo; Ranchi no Akko-chan; Itō-kun A to E; Nairu pāchi no joshikai
- Notable awards: All Yomimono Prize for New Writers; Yamamoto Shūgorō Prize

Asako Yuzuki (柚木 麻子, Yuzuki Asako; born 2 August 1981) is a Japanese writer. She has won the All Yomimono Prize for New Writers and the Yamamoto Shūgorō Prize, she has been nominated multiple times for the Naoki Prize, and her novels have been adapted for television, radio, and film.

== Early life and education ==
Yuzuki was born in Tokyo in 1981. During her early school years she read books by foreign authors, including Beverly Cleary's Ramona series, Anne of Green Gables, and Judy Blume's young adult novels. While in junior high school Yuzuki had a serious illness, and during her recovery she read the novel Kitchen by Banana Yoshimoto, which convinced her to read more Japanese literature. She later attended Rikkyo University, where she studied French literature. After submitting a senior thesis on Honoré de Balzac and graduating from college Yuzuki worked for a confectionery maker, but later quit to focus on her writing.

== Career ==
In 2008 Yuzuki won the 88th All Yomimono Prize for New Writers for the story "Forget Me, Not Blue", about bullying in a Protestant all-girls school in Tokyo. The story was first published in the literary magazine All Yomimono and later collected with three other connected stories into the 2010 volume Shūten no ano ko (終点のあの子), which became Yuzuki's first published book. In 2011 her novel Nageki no bijo (嘆きの美女), about a woman who becomes frustrated with the prevalence of attractive people online and attempts to vandalize a beauty web site, was published by Asahi Shimbun and subsequently adapted into an NHK BS Premium television comedy series starring Akiko Yada.

Yuzuki published several books in 2013, including Ōhi no kikan (王妃の帰還, Return of the Queen), Ranchi no Akko-chan (ランチのアッコちゃん), and Itō-kun A to E (伊藤くん A to E). Ōhi no kikan, a novel about a pretty girl who enters a clique of less popular manga and idol otaku girls in middle school, was published by Jitsugyō no Nihonsha. It was later adapted into a 2018 NHK radio drama. Akka's Lunches (ランチのアッコちゃん, Ranchi no Akko-chan), a book containing four connected short stories about the increasingly personal relationship between a young office worker and her older female boss, was published by Futabasha. It was later adapted into a 2015 NHK BS Premium television drama of the same name, starring Misako Renbutsu and Naho Toda.

Itō-kun A to E (伊藤くん A to E), a series of linked short stories about different women who are each interested in the same man, was published in 2013 by Gentosha. Ito-kun A to E was nominated for the 150th Naoki Prize, marking Yuzuki's first nomination for the prize. She did not win, as the 150th Naoki Prize was awarded to Makate Asai and Kaoruko Himeno. The book was later adapted into the 2017 romantic comedy television series The Many Faces of Ito, starring Fumino Kimura and directed by Ryūichi Hiroki. A movie version was also released in theaters.

Yuzuki was subsequently nominated for the Naoki Prize several more times. Her novel Honya-san no Daiana (本屋さんのダイアナ, Diana the Book Clerk), a story about a years-long friendship between two girls from different backgrounds, was published by Shinchosha in 2014 and nominated for the 151st Naoki Prize. She did not win, as the award went to Hiroyuki Kurakawa. In 2015 Yuzuki's novel Nairu pāchi no joshikai (ナイルパーチの女子会, Nile Perch Women's Club), a story about two women whose lives intersect as one blackmails the other, was published by Bungeishunjū. Nile Perch Women's Club won the 28th Yamamoto Shūgorō Prize. It was also nominated for the 153rd Naoki Prize.

Yuzuki's fourth Naoki Prize nomination came in 2017, when her novel Butter was nominated for the 157th Naoki Prize. Butter, a story about a reporter investigating a woman accused of luring men with her cooking and then killing them, was loosely based on an actual series of suspicious deaths of middle-aged men that led to murder convictions and a death sentence for Kanae Kijima. Yuzuki did not win the 157th Naoki Prize, as the award went to Shogo Sato.

In 2018, Yuzuki's novel Date Cleansing (デートクレンジング, Dēto kurenjingu) was published by Shōdensha. The following year she was nominated a fifth time for the Naoki Prize, for her book Magical Grandma (マジカルグランマ, Majikaru Guranma).

Yuzuki's 2017 novel Butter was translated into English by Polly Barton and published in 2024 as Butter: A Novel of Food and Murder, her first book to be published in English. It was named Waterstones Book of the Year 2024. Her 2015 novel Nairu pāchi no joshikai was also translated into English by Barton and published in 2026 as Hooked: A Novel of Obsession.

== Recognition ==
- 2008 88th All Yomimono Prize for New Writers
- 2015 28th Yamamoto Shūgorō Prize

== Adaptations ==
- Nageki no bijo, NHK BS Premium, 2013
- Ranchi no Akko-chan, NHK BS Premium, 2015
- The Many Faces of Ito, MBS/Netflix, 2017
- Ōhi no kikan, NHK FM (radio), 2018

== Selected works ==
- Shūten no ano ko (終点のあの子), Bungeishunjū, 2010, ISBN 9784163292106 (includes "Forget Me, Not Blue")
- Nageki no bijo (嘆きの美女), Asahi Shimbun Shuppan, 2011, ISBN 9784022508935
- The Hotel of My Dream (私にふさわしいホテル, Watashi ni Fusawashii Hoteru), Fusosha Publishing, 2012, ISBN 4594066836
- Ōhi no kikan (王妃の帰還, Return of the Queen), Jitsugyō no Nihonsha, 2013, ISBN 9784408536194
- Ranchi no Akko-chan (ランチのアッコちゃん), Futabasha, 2013, ISBN 9784575238198
- Itō-kun A to E (伊藤くん A to E), Gentosha, 2013, ISBN 9784344024588
- The Nile Perch Women's Club (ナイルパーチの女子会, Nairu pāchi no joshikai), Bungeishunjū, 2015, ISBN 9784163902296
- Butter (バター, Batā), Shinchosha, 2017, ISBN 9784103355328
- Date Cleansing (デートクレンジング, Dēto kurenjingu), Shōdensha, 2018, ISBN 9784396635411
- Magical Grandma (マジカルグランマ, Majikaru Guranma), Asahi Shimbun Shuppan, 2019, ISBN 9784022516046
