= Mild Vertigo =

1997 novel by Mieko Kanai

- Author: Mieko Kanai
- Translator: Polly Barton
- Language: Japanese
- Genre: Literary fiction, modernist fiction
- Published: Japan
- Publisher: Kodansha (Japanese); New Directions (English)
- Publication date: April 1, 1997 (Japanese); May 2, 2023 (English)
- Pages: 208 (Japanese); 192 (English)
- ISBN: 978-4062043083
- Preceded by: 恋愛太平記 (Love Taiheiki)
- Followed by: 柔らかい土をふんで, (Stepping on Soft Soil)

Mild Vertigo (軽いめまい, Karui memai; lit. Light dizziness) is a novel by Mieko Kanai originally serialized in Katei gahō before getting published as a novel in 1997 by Kodansha. In 2023, an English translation by Polly Barton was published by New Directions.

== Synopsis ==
The novel follows a housewife, Natsumi, as she lives and tends to an apartment in Tokyo where she lives with her husband and two sons. Oscillating between Natsumi's internal monologues and her interactions with family and friends, the novel is a portrait of middle-class life in the city.

== Critical reception ==
In a starred review, Kirkus Reviews called it "A subtle, thoughtful portrait of a woman chafing at the demands and constraints of domestic life."

The New York Times noted "the mesmerizing wonder of Kanai's prose, as translated by Polly Barton" and briefly compared its sense of womanhood to Mrs Dalloway. The Atlantic lauded the novel as a "domestic horror story" and hoped that the successful translation by Barton would lead to more subsequent translations of Kanai's work into English. Similarly, The Cleveland Review of Books and The Spectator sharply observed and celebrated Kanai's approach to domestic life in Tokyo. The Japan Times admired both "Kanai's distinctive style" and "Barton's mesmerizing translation." The Times Literary Supplement called it a great modernist drama.

The translated novel was recommended by The Guardian in a September 2023 reading list.
