= Mosawo =

Japanese singer-songwriter

Mosawo もさを。
- Genre: J-Pop
- Years active: 2017–present

Mosawo (Japanese: もさを。) is a Japanese singer-songwriter. He became popular during the COVID-19 pandemic among Zoomers due to his song "Gyutto". He is well known for his style of singing from a female perspective.

== History ==
Mosawo was originally a member of a baseball club and wanted to become a professional baseball player. He was forced to give up due to an injury. Mosawo stated that Shota Shimizu inspired him to be a singer when he saw him on TV when he was in his first year in middle school, In an interview with PIA, he admires Shota's "way of having his own worldview that isn't influenced by the people around him". He founded a music club and played guitar and vocals where they played cover songs of Radwimps and One Ok Rock.

In 2017, Mosawo started uploading song covers on YouTube with him singing and playing guitars. At the same time, he also uploaded it on Twitter and began collaborating with other users on the karaoke app named nana.

In March 2020, Mosawo posted a single phrase of "Gyutto" on TikTok. The song grew in popularity, the original video accumulated more than 200,000 likes, and comments, and many people commented that they wanted to see Mosawo become a singer. It was used in more than 30,000 videos and accumulated 300 million views on TikTok. Mosawo released his first single, "Gyutto", digitally in July 2020.

Mosawo's single "Aitai" was released in October 2020. In September 2021, he release another single "Koiiro", and inspired by the manga A Sign of Affection. In November of the same year, his song "Caramel" was used as the opening theme for the Japanese drama My Beautiful Man.

In October 2022, Mosawo performed the theme song of the Japanese drama series Piece of Cake entitled "Halleluyah". In December of the same year, he releases his first album "Koi no Uta" containing his previous songs.

On January 16, 2023, Mosawo held his first ever live performance at WWW in Tokyo, following that he also held performances in Nagoya and Osaka in May of that year. In March of the same year, he performed the song "Brownie" for the commercial for Nōkō Choco Brownies.

He went into hiatus for a year and a half until June 2025, and at the same time, revealed his face to the public.

== Style ==
Mosawo stated that he sang mainly love songs with lyrics from a female perspective. In an interview with PIA, he said he writes songs such as "Kira Kira" "imagining the feelings of a woman with unrequited love" and often uses feminine terms and pronouns such as "Atashi" (あたし) when singing about "my feelings for him." Ayaka Sakai of Billboard Japan described his style as "easier to remember."

== Reception ==
Mosawo became popular among Zoomers during the COVID-19 pandemic because of the lyrics to his song "Gyutto", and noted that he is a "talent that suddenly appeared during the COVID-19 pandemic". He charted 39 times in the Billboard Japan's "Artist 100" peaking at 27th place on December 16, 2020. Mosawo also charted twice for the "Artist 100 Year End" peaking at 63rd in 2021.

== Discography ==
=== Albums ===
| Album title | Release date | Ref |
|---|---|---|
| Koi no Uta (こいのうた) | December 7, 2022 | |

=== Singles ===
| Song title | Release date | Ref |
|---|---|---|
| "Gyutto" (ぎゅっと。) | July 27, 2020 | |
| "Kira Kira" (きらきら) | September 7, 2020 | |
| "Suki ga Afureteitano" (好きが溢れていたの) | September 26, 2020 | |
| "Aitai" (会いたい) | October 26, 2020 | |
| "Fuyu Puresento" (冬のプレゼント) | November 20, 2020 | |
| "Sakura Koi" (桜恋) | February 22, 2021 | |
| "Koiiro" (恋色) | September 12, 2021 | |
| "Ano Oto" (あの音) | October 27, 2021 | (Note: along with Anatsume) |
| "Caramel" (カラメル) | November 21, 2021 | |
| "Mou Ichido" (feat. asmi) (もう一度 (feat. asmi)) | March 22, 2022 | |
| "Rakugaki" (ラクガキ) | June 20, 2022 | |
| "Gift" (ギフト) | July 27, 2022 | |
| "Cider" (サイダー) | August 23, 2022 | |
| "Kinmokusei" (キンモクセイ) | February 22, 2023 | |
| "Brownie" (ブラウニー) | April 26, 2023 | |
| "Love Song" | November 15, 2023 | |
| "Snow White" | December 13, 2023 | |
