= The Many Faces of Ito =

Japanese television series

- Based on: Ito Kun A to E by Asako Yuzuki
- Screenplay by: Kôhei Kiyasu; Miho Aotsuka; Kana Matsui; Susumu Funahashi; Asako Yuzuki
- Directed by: Ryuichi Hiroki; Hirofumi Inaba; Yasutaka Môri
- Starring: Fumino Kimura; Nozomi Sasaki; Kaho; Tomoya Nakamura; Yuki Yamada; Mirai Shida; Elaiza Ikeda; Rio Yamashita; Kei Tanaka; Masaki Okada
- Music by: Kôji Endô
- Country of origin: Japan
- Original language: Japanese

Production
- Producer: Tokyo Broadcasting System
- Running time: 23 minutes

Original release
- Network: Netflix
- Release: August 11, 2017

The Many Faces of Ito (Japanese: 伊藤くん A to E, Hepburn: Itou-kun A to E) is a Netflix original romantic comedy series about a thirty-something rom-com screenwriter, Rio Yazaki, who manipulates four love-sick women for their stories under the guise of giving them romantic advice.

Season 1 of The Many Faces of Ito premiered on August 11, 2017. The series is based on the book "Ito-Kun A to E" by Japanese author Asako Yuzuki.

== Cast ==
- Fumino Kimura as Rio Yazaki (E)
- Nozomi Sasaki as Tomomi Shimahara (A)
- Mirai Shida as Shūko Nose (B)
- Elaiza Ikeda as Satoko Aida (C)
- Kaho as Miki Jinbo (D)
- Yuki Yamada as Okita
- Tomoya Nakamura as Kentarō Kuzumi
- Rio Yamashita as Maki Miyata
- Kei Tanaka as Shin'ya Tamura
- Masaki Okada as Seijirō Ito
