= Gokudō Meshi =

Japanese manga series

- First volume cover

極道めし
- Manga
- Written by: Shigeru Tsuchiyama
- Published by: Futabasha
- Magazine: Weekly Manga Action
- Original run: 2006 – 2013
- Volumes: 10
- Live-action film
- Directed by: Tetsu Maeda
- Released: September 23, 2011
- Runtime: 108 minutes

Gokudō Meshi (極道めし; "Scoundrels' Meals") is a Japanese manga series by Shigeru Tsuchiyama. It has been adapted into a live-action film also known as Sukiyaki in 2011.

== Cast ==
- Tasuku Nagaoka as Kenta Nagoaka
- Masanobu Katsumura as Shinta Minami
- Motoki Ochiai as Shunsuke Aida
- Gitaro as Chanko
- Akaji Maro as Kosanro Hachinohe
- Fumino Kimura as Shiori Mizushima
- Tomoko Tabata as Aya Kurihara
- Yōji Tanaka as Prison officer Ishihara
- Houka Kinoshita as Prison officer Iwamoto
- Denden as Gawara Gosho
- Hana Kido as Chizuru Aida
- Chika Uchida as Mari
- Kazuo Kawabata
