= Mieko Kanai =

Japanese writer (born 1947)

Mieko Kanai (金井 美恵子, Kanai Mieko; born November 3, 1947) is a Japanese writer, poet, and literary critic.

== Biography ==
Mieko Kanai was born in Takasaki, Gunma Prefecture, November 3, 1947. Her father died when she was six years of age. She has a sister who is a painter and illustrator.

Kanai graduated from Takasaki Girls' High School in 1966. The following year, Kanai's short story Ai no Seikatsu ("Love Life") was nominated for the Osamu Dazai Prize.

In 1968, Kanai released two short stories: Umi no Kajitsu ("The Fruit of the Sea"), which was retitled as Shizen no Kodomo ("Children in Nature"), and "Eonta" (Ontology). Both were well received. The same year, Kanai was awarded the Gendaishi Techou Prize for poetry. Her first poetry collection, Madamu Juju no ie ("The House of Madam Juju") was published in 1971.

In 1970, Kanai's short story Yume no Jikan ("Time of Dreams") was nominated for the Akutagawa Prize.

Kanai has built a reputation as an "abstract" or "surrealist" author.

== Awards ==
- 1968 - Gendaishi Techou Prize for poetry
- 1979 - Izumi Kyoka Prize for Puratonteki ren’ai ("Platonic Love")
- 1988 - Women's Literature Prize for Tamaya ("Oh, Tama!")

== Selected works ==
- "Homecoming" (Kikan, 1970) (short story)
- "The House of Madam Juju" (Madamu Juju no ie, 1971) (poetry collection)
- "Rotting Meat" (Funiku, 1972)
- "Portrait of Mother and Child" (Boshizo, 1972) (short novel)
- "Rabbits" (Usagi, 1973) (short story)
- "The Shoreless Sea" (Kishibe no nai umi, 1974)
- "The Acacia Knights" (Akashia kishi dan, 1976) (short story collection)
- "Platonic Love" (Puraton teki Ren'ai, 1979) (short story)
- "The Word Book" (Tangoshū, 1979) (short story collection)
- "Mirror in the Water" (Mizu Kagami, 1980)
- "Writing Classrooms" (Bunshou kyoushitsu, 1986)
- "Inside a Bright Room" (Akarui heya no naka de, 1986)
- "Medicine Pills" (Yaku dama, 1987)
- "Oh, Tama!" (Tama-ya, 1987)
- "Indian Summer" (1988) (short novel)
- "Love Taiheiki" (Ren'ai Taiheiki, 1995)
- "Mild Vertigo" (Karui memai, 1997)
- "Stepping on Soft Soil" (Yawarakai tsuchi wo funde, 1997)
- "2 or 3 Things I Know about Them" (2000, sequel to Indian Summer)
- "The Girl in the Rumor" (Uwasa no musume, 2002)
- "Piece of Cake and Twice Told Tales" (2012)
- "A Star is Born" (Sutaa tanjō, 2018)

=== Translated works ===
- "The House of Madam Juju," translated by Christopher Drake (1977)
- "In the Town with Catshaped Maze," translated by Ikuko Atsumi and Kenneth Rexroth (1977)
- "Tama," translated by Mark Jewel, Japanese Literature Today, vol. 14, 1989, pp. 5-12.
- "Oh, Tama!: A Mejiro Novel," translated by Tomoko Aoyama and Paul McCarthy
- "Indian Summer", translated by Tomoko Aoyama and Barbara Hartley (2012).
- Mild Vertigo translated by Polly Barton (2023)
