= Motoki Ochiai =

Japanese actor (born 1990)

- Born: 11 July 1990 (age 36); Tokyo, Japan
- Occupation: Actor
- Years active: 2001–present

Motoki Ochiai (落合 モトキ, Ochiai Motoki; born July 11, 1990) is a Japanese actor. He appeared in more than 40 films since 2001.

== Selected filmography ==
=== Films ===
Year	Title	Role	Notes	Ref.
2004	Last Quarter	Masaki Miura		
2008	Love Exposure			
2011	Gokudō Meshi	Shunsuke Aida		
2012	11:25 The Day He Chose His Own Fate			
2012	The Kirishima Thing			
2014	Sweet Poolside			
2014	Jossy's			
2014	Hot Road	Richard		
2015	Her Granddaughter			
2016	Japanese Girls Never Die			
2016	Jinx!!!	Hayato Matsuzaka		
2018	Watashi no Jinsei nanoni			
2020	Awake			
2021	Jump!! The Heroes Behind the Gold	Noriaki Kasai		
2021	Funny Bunny			
2022	Their Backs	Akatsuki		
2023	Majo no Kōsui			
2023	My Beautiful Man: Eternal	Shitara		
2023	G-Men	Tomonori		
2023	Whale Bones	Mamiya	Lead role	
2024	Undead Lovers			
2024	Cha-Cha			
2026	Between Two Lovers	Kon-chan		
2027	Last Vacation			

=== Television ===
Year	Title	Role	Notes	Ref.
2005	Pink no Idenshi	Daisuke Yuki		
2016	Ossan's Love	Yukiya Hasegawa		
2023	My Beautiful Man	Shitara	Season 2	
2023	Ranman	Takamitsu Itō	Asadora	
2025	Unbound	Shimizu Shigeyoshi	Taiga drama	
