= Wave, Listen to Me! =

Japanese manga series and its adaptations

- First tankōbon volume cover, featuring Minare Koda

波よ聞いてくれ (Nami yo Kiitekure)
- Genre: Comedy; Slice of life
- Manga
- Written by: Hiroaki Samura
- Published by: Kodansha
- English publisher: NA: Kodansha USA
- Imprint: Afternoon KC
- Magazine: Monthly Afternoon
- Original run: July 25, 2014 – present
- Volumes: 13
- Anime television series
- Directed by: Tatsuma Minamikawa
- Produced by: Toshihiro Maeda; Chitose Kawazoe; Takuya Matsumoto; Hiroshi Ootsuka
- Written by: Shōji Yonemura
- Music by: Motoyoshi Iwasaki
- Studio: Sunrise
- Licensed by: Crunchyroll
- Original network: MBS, TBS, BS-TBS, HBC
- Original run: April 4, 2020 – June 20, 2020
- Episodes: 12
- Television drama

Born to Be on Air!
- Directed by: Takashi Sumida; Osamu Katayama; Hisashi Ueda
- Written by: Kazunao Furuya
- Music by: Yuki Hayashi; Shōgo Yamashiro
- Studio: TV Asahi; MMJ
- Original network: ANN (TV Asahi)
- Original run: April 21, 2023 – June 9, 2023
- Episodes: 8
- icon

Wave, Listen to Me! (Japanese: 波よ聞いてくれ, Hepburn: Nami yo Kiitekure) is a Japanese manga series by Hiroaki Samura. It has been serialized in Kodansha's seinen manga magazine Monthly Afternoon since July 2014, with its chapters collected in 13 tankōbon volumes as of August 2026. The manga is published in North America by Kodansha Comics. An anime television series adaptation produced by Sunrise aired from April to June 2020 on MBS's Animeism block. A television drama adaptation, titled in English as Born to Be on Air!, aired on TV Asahi from April to June 2023.

== Plot ==
Minare Koda, a floor manager at a small restaurant in Sapporo, tries to deal with her bad breakup with an ex-boyfriend. In the process, she drunkenly vents her frustrations to an older man sitting next to her at a local bar. The following day, she discovers that the man works as a producer at a nearby radio station, which broadcast her drunken ramblings over the airwaves.

As Minare's voice gains her more attention than her work at the restaurant, she ends up becoming a late-night radio talk show host at the same station, trying to balance her talk show with her daytime life to make ends meet.

== Characters ==
The cast of Wave, Listen to Me!

Minare Koda (鼓田 ミナレ, Koda Minare)
Voiced by: Riho Sugiyama (Japanese); Terri Doty (English)
Portrayed by: Fuka Koshiba
An amateur radio talk show host. She starts out as a waitress at the restaurant Voyager, and often gets into trouble because of her anger management problems. Shortly after breaking up with her ex-boyfriend Mitsuo, she ranted about it and was broadcast over the radio leading her to get fired by the restaurant, as well as get a job opportunity working for a local radio station starting out as a weekly late night talk show host.
Kanetsugu Matō (麻藤 兼嗣, Matō Kanetsugu)
Voiced by: Shinshū Fuji (Japanese); Christopher R. Sabat (English)
Portrayed by: Kazuki Kitamura
Minare's boss at the radio station.
Mizuho Nanba (南波 瑞穂, Nanba Mizuho)
Voiced by: Manaka Iwami (Japanese); Tia Ballard (English)
Portrayed by: Nanoka Hara
Minare's co-worker at the radio station. Minare later moves into her apartment to live with her after getting evicted due to her inability to pay the rent.
Katsumi Kureko (久連木 克三, Kureko Katsumi)
Voiced by: Kazuhiro Yamaji (Japanese); Charlie Campbell (English)
Portrayed by: Mantarō Koichi
Madoka Chishiro (茅代 まどか, Chishiro Madoka)
Voiced by: Sayaka Ohara (Japanese); Monica Rial (English)
Portrayed by: Aya Hirano
Ryūsuke Kōmoto (甲本 龍丞, Kōmoto Ryūsuke)
Voiced by: Kaito Ishikawa (Japanese); Zach Bolton (English)
Chūya Nakahara (中原 忠也, Nakahara Chūya)
Voiced by: Masaaki Yano (Japanese); Ian Sinclair (English)
Portrayed by: Ryota Katayose
A chef at Voyager.
Makie Tachibana (城華 マキエ, Tachibana Makie)
Voiced by: Mamiko Noto (Japanese); Katelyn Barr (English)
Portrayed by: Yurika Nakamura
A waitress at Voyager. She begins working there after her brother was at fault for an accident that led to restaurant's manager being hospitalized. She later develops feelings for Chuya.
Yoshiki Takarada (宝田 嘉樹, Takarada Yoshiki)
Voiced by: Bin Shimada (Japanese); Kent Williams (English)
Portrayed by: Mizuki Nishimura
Manager and lead chef at the restaurant Voyager.
Mitsuo Suga (須賀 光雄, Suga Mitsuo)
Voiced by: Daisuke Namikawa (Japanese); Austin Tindle (English)
Minare's ex-boyfriend.
Shinji Oki (沖 進次, Oki Shinji)
Voiced by: Kōki Uchiyama (Japanese); Jessie James Grelle (English)
Minare's neighbor who lives in the unit below her.

== Media ==
=== Manga ===
Written and illustrated by Hiroaki Samura, Wave, Listen to Me! started in Kodansha's seinen manga magazine Monthly Afternoon on July 25, 2014. Kodansha has collected its chapters into individual tankōbon volumes. The first volume was released on May 22, 2015. As of August 21, 2026, 13 volumes have been released.

In North America, Kodansha USA began releasing the manga digitally on January 24, 2017. Kodansha started publishing the manga in print on May 26, 2020.

==== Volumes ====
No.	Original release date	Original ISBN	English release date	English ISBN
1	May 22, 2015	978-4-06-388058-8	January 24, 2017 (digital); May 26, 2020 (print)	978-1-68233-468-3 (digital); 978-1-63236-867-6 (print)
1. "I Won't Forgive You!" (お前を許さない, Omae o Yurusanai); 2. "I Want You." (お前が欲しい, Omae ga Hoshī); 3. "I Despise Them." (奴らが憎い, Yatsura ga Nikui); 4. "I Need Something from You." (あなたに用がある, Anata ni Yō ga Aru); 5. "You Guys Are So Lax." (お前らは緩い, Omaera wa Yurui); 6. "I'll Leave It to You." (あなたにまかせます, Anata ni Makasemasu); 7. "You Won't Go Home." (あなたが帰らない, Anata ga Kaeranai); 8. "You Won't Smile." (君は笑わない, Kimi wa Warawanai)
2	February 23, 2016	978-4-06-388125-7	January 31, 2017 (digital); May 26, 2020 (print)	978-1-68233-546-8 (digital); 978-1-63236-868-3 (print)
9. "I Won't Let You Leave Alive." (生かして帰さない, Ikashite Kisanai); 10. "I Won't Let You Starve." (お前を飢えさせない, Omae o Uesasenai); 11. "I Miss You." (君に会いたい, Kimi ni Aitai); 12. "I Won't Let You Go." (お前を離さない, Omae o Hanasanai); 13. "I Won't Believe You." (お前を信じない, Omae o Shinjinai); 14. "I Want You to Spoil Me." (君に甘えたい, Kimi ni Amaetai); 15. "I Won't Connect with You." (お前に繋がらない, Omae ni Tsunagaranai); 16. "I Won't Die." (俺は亡びない, Ore wa Horobinai)
3	November 22, 2016	978-4-06-388214-8	April 24, 2017 (digital); August 25, 2020 (print)	978-1-68233-682-3 (digital); 978-1-63236-869-0 (print)
17. "Anaerobes Fear Nothing." (嫌気生物は畏れない, Kenkiseibutsu wa Osorenai); 18. "It's My Duty." (私がせねばなるまい, Watashi ga Seneba Narumai); 19. "I Want to Warm You Up." (あなたをぬくめたい, Anata o Nukumetai); 20. "They Don't Exist." (そんなモノはいない, Sonna Mono wa Inai); 21. "Steam Is Unconcealable." (湯煙は隠さない, Yukemuri wa Kakusanai); 22. "I Want to Cry." (私は哭きたい, Watashi wa Nakitai); 23. "I Want to Support You." (あなたを支えたい, Anata o Sasaetai); 24. "Don't Mess with Yakitori." (焼き鳥は外さない, Yakitori wa Hazusanai)
4	September 22, 2017	978-4-06-388288-9	October 6, 2020 (digital); October 20, 2020 (print)	978-1-64659-753-6 (digital); 978-1-63236-870-6 (print)
25. "The Party Goes On." (宴は終わらない, Utage wa Owaranai); 26. "I Can't Go Back There." (そこには戻らない, Soko ni wa Modoranai); 27. "Things Won't Play Out." (形にならない, Katachi ni Naranai); 28. "I Can't Talk About It Over the Phone." (電話じゃ話せない, Denwa ja Hanasenai); 29. "You Can't Save Everyone." (全員は救えない, Zenin wa Sukuenai); 30. "My Heart Won't Reach You." (こころが届かない, Kokoro ga Todokanai); 31. "I Want to Chase After You." (あなたを追って行きたい, Anata o Otteikitai); 32. "I Don't Wanna Go with You." (あなたとは行きたくない, Anata to wa Ikitakunai)
5	July 23, 2018	978-4-06-511983-9	January 19, 2021 (digital); March 2, 2021 (print)	978-1-64659-440-5 (digital); 978-1-63236-871-3 (print)
33. "I Won't Lose." (私は負けない, Watashi wa Makenai); 34. "I Don't Want to Be Fooled." (騙(だま)されたくはない, Damasaretaku wa Nai); 35. "I Won't Acknowledge Them." (奴らを認めない, Yatsura o Mitomenai); 36. "Shamed Be the Man Whom Spurns a Woman's Advances." (据(す)え膳(ぜん)は食わない, Suezen wa Kuwanai); 37. "That's Not Your Duty." (その役目はお前じゃない, Sono Yakume wa Omae janai); 38. "I Don't Know My Own Name." (名前はわからない, Namae wa Wakaranai); 39. "I Won't Say It." (口には出せない, Kuchi ni wa Dasenai); 40. "I Can't Lose Anything." (君は失えない, Kimi wa Ushinae Nai)
6	March 22, 2019	978-4-06-514837-2	April 20, 2021 (digital); June 1, 2021 (print)	978-1-64659-926-4 (digital); 978-1-63236-808-9 (print)
41. "I'm Sure It's You." (君に間違いない, Kimi ni Machigainai); 42. "I Can't Find the Words." (言葉がみつからない, Kotoba ga Mitsukaranai); 43. "I Won't Let You." (そうはさせない, Sō wa Sasenai); 44. "Nothing Lasts Forever." (変わらないものはない, Kawaranai Mono wa Nai); 45. "They Don't Care." (向こう側は気にしない, Mukōgawa wa Ki ni Shinai); 46. "Not All Men Are Dirtbags." (悪い男ばかりじゃない, Warui Otoko bakari janai); 47. "I Can't Confine You." (あなたは引き留めない, Anata wa Hikitomenai); 48. "I Won't Know Unless I Hurt You." (傷つけないとわからない, Kizutsukenaito Wakaranai)
7	December 23, 2019	978-4-06-517924-6	August 10, 2021 (digital); October 12, 2021 (print)	978-1-63699-047-7 (digital); 978-1-63236-817-1 (print)
49. "You're the Only Screwup Here." (お前だけが不甲斐ない, Omae dake ga Fugainai); 50. "I Can't Be Bothered." (腰が上がらない, Koshi ga Agaranai); 51. "Who Cares as Long as I Win." (勝てば問題ない, Kateba Mondainai); 52. "I Trust No One." (何も信じない, Nani mo Shinjinai); 53. "I Want to Use Whatever I Can." (使えるものは使いたい, Tsukaeru Mono wa Tsukaitai); 54. "Better Safe than Sorry." (用心するに越したことはない, Yōjin Suru ni Koshita Koto wa Nai); 55. "Inconceivable." (思いもよらない, Omoi mo Yoranai); 56. "I Can't Even See Your Face." (お前の顔も見えやしない, Omae no Kao mo Mieyashinai)
8	October 23, 2020	978-4-06-521107-6	January 25, 2022	978-1-63699-145-0 (digital); 978-1-64651-264-5 (print)
57. "You're Not Alone." (お前は一人じゃない, Omae wa Hitori janai); 58. "I Can't Stay Here." (ここには居られない, Koko ni wa Irarenai); 59. "You Don't Get It." (わかってなんかいない, Wakatte nanka Inai); 60. "I Can't Pick a Time or Place." (場所を選んではいられない, Basho o Erande wa Irarenai); 61. "People Don't Change Overnight." (急には変えられない, Kyū ni wa Kaerarenai); 61.5 "It's Not That Simple." (そう単純なものでもない, Sō Tanjunna Monode mo Nai); 62. "I Can't Hold Back All the Time." (抑えてばかりもいられない, Osaete bakari mo Irarenai); 63. "I Show No Mercy to Strangers." (知らぬ奴でも容赦しない, Shiranu Yatsu demo Yōsha Shinai); 64. "That's Not How the World Works." (そういう世界じゃない, Sōiu Sekai janai); Bonus: "I Can't Be Honest with Myself." (素直になれない。, Sunao ni Narenai.)
9	January 21, 2022	978-4-06-526548-2	May 31, 2022 (digital); January 24, 2023 (print)	978-1-63699-188-7 (digital); 978-1-64651-265-2 (print)
65. "Let's Get One Thing Straight." (これだけは言っておきたい, Kore dake wa Itteokitai); 66. "Not for Beginners." (初心者に優しくない, Shoshinsha ni Yasashikunai); 67. "Don't Come Back." (来ないでほしい, Konaide Hoshī); 68. "It's Too Soon to Call It Quits." (終わるにはまだ早い, Owaru ni wa Mada Hayai); 69. "I Take After No One." (誰にも似ていない, Dare ni mo Niteinai); 70. "It's Not What You Think It Is." (これはそういうアレではない, Kore wa Sōiu Are de wa Nai); 71. "Who Are You Really?" (正体が知りたい, Shōtai ga Shiritai); 72. "Romance Is Fleeting." (ロマンスは長く続かない, Romansu wa Nagaku Tsuzukanai); 73. "I Don't Think I'll Make It Back." (とてもじゃないが戻れない, Totemo janaiga Modorenai); 74. "I Don't Want to Worry Anyone." (心配はかけたくない, Shinpai wa Kaketakunai); 75. "The Flame Yet Burns." (灯は消えない, Akari wa Kienai)
10	April 21, 2023	978-4-06-531373-2	November 21, 2023	979-8-88933-312-8 (digital); 978-1-64651-442-7 (print)
76. "I'm Not Just Sitting on My Butt." (じっとしているだけではない, Jitto Shiteiru dakede wa Nai); 77. "Believe It or Not, I'm Not Alone." (こう見えて一人じゃない, Kō Miete Hitori janai); 78. "You Never Stood a Chance." (お前が勝てるはずもない, Omae ga Kateru Hazu mo Nai); 79. "We're Shorthanded." (人手が足りない, Hitode ga Tarinai); 80. "I'm Not the One Who's Prey." (食われる側ではない, Kuwarerugawa de wa Nai); 81. "You Mustn't Pursue." (追ってはいけない, Otte wa Ikenai); 82. "Nothing Happened Last Year." (去年は何もない, Kyonen wa Nani mo Nai); 83. "I'll Never Leave You Again." (二度と離れはしない, Nidoto Hanare wa Shinai); 84. "I Won't Hide Anything from You." (隠し通せはしない, Kakushi Tōse wa Shinai); 85. "Something Must Have Happened." (何かあったに違いない, Nani ka Atta ni Chigainai)
11	April 23, 2024	978-4-06-535140-6	April 21, 2026	979-8-89478-578-3 (digital); 979-8-88877-398-7 (print)
86. "I Won't Hand Her Over to You." (お前には渡さない, Omae ni wa Watasanai); 87. "I Haven't Given Up." (諦めてるわけじゃない, Akirameteru Wake janai); 88. "I Can't Go Home Yet." (まだまだ帰れない, Madamada Kaerenai); 89. "This Is No Time for Chitchat." (お喋りしてる場合じゃない, Oshaberi Shiteru Bāi janai); 90. "You're Our Only Hope." (あなたにしかできない, Anata ni shika Dekinai); 91. "I Want to Tell You Something." (伝えておきたい, Tsutaete Okitai); 92. "There's No Future Here." (ここに未来はない, Koko ni Mirai wa Nai); 93. "Hell No It's Not All Right." (良いわけがない, Yoi Wake ga Nai); 94. "Hell No I Won't Agree." (頷くわけがない, Unazuku Wake ga Nai); 95. "It Might Not Be True." (本当とは限らない, Hontō to wa Kagiranai)
12	June 23, 2025	978-4-06-539611-7	October 20, 2026	979-8-89830-241-2 (digital); 979-8-88877-733-6 (print)
96. "I'm Not the Same as Before." (昔と同じじゃない, Mukashi to Onaji janai); 97. "There's Not Only One Path." (道は一つじゃない, Michi wa Hitotsu janai); 98. "You Don't Understand a Thing." (なんにもわかってない, Nannimo Wakattenai); 99. "Nothing but Regrets." (後悔しかない, Kōkai shika Nai); 100. "This Can't Go On." (このままではいられない, Kono Mama de wa Irarenai); 101. "There Are Other Ways." (やり方はひとつじゃない, Yarikata wa Hitotsu janai); 102. "Lamenting Will Get You Nowhere." (憂いていても始まらない, Uiteite mo Hajimaranai); 103. "I Don't Know This Face." (この顔は知らない, Kono Kao wa Shiranai); 104. "I Won't Forgive Radio." (ラジオを許さない, Rajio o Yurusanai); 105. "Change Is Not Instant." (すぐには変われない, Sugu ni wa Kaware Nai); 106. "I Won't Go Gently." (ただでは去れない, Tada de wa Sare Nai); 107. "It's Not That Easy." (できたら苦労しない, Dekitara Kurō Shinai)
13	August 21, 2026	978-4-06-544414-6	—	—
108. Shiranukao wa Dekinai (知らぬ顔はできない); 109. Daijina Tokoro ga Atattenai (大事なところが当たってない); 110. Watashi no Kotode wa Nai (私のことではない); 111. Nani mo Erakunai (何もえらくない); 112. Deshi wa Tsunottenai (弟子は募ってない); 113. Kiku Mimi o Motanai (聞く耳を持たない); 114. Hara o Kukuru shika Nai (腹をくくるしかない); 115. Sugu ni wa Oitsukenai (すぐには追いつけない); 116. Hitotsu ya Futatsu janai (ひとつやふたつじゃない); 117. Kono Oto janai (この音じゃない); 118. Kekkyoku Miataranai (結局みあたらない)

=== Anime ===
An anime television series adaptation was announced in October 2019. The series is animated at Sunrise and directed by Tatsuma Minamikawa, with Shōji Yonemura handling series composition, Takumi Yokota designing the characters and Motoyoshi Iwasaki composing the series' music. It aired from April 4 to June 20, 2020, on the Animeism programming block on MBS, TBS and BS-TBS, as well as HBC. (Note: MBS listed the air dates for the series on Friday at 26:25, which is effectively Saturday at 2:25 a.m. JST.) Tacica performs the series' opening theme song "Aranami", while Harumi contributed to the series' ending theme song "Pride". The show had an advanced screening event for the first two episodes at United Cinema Toyosu in Tokyo on March 22 with Riho Sugiyama, Shinshū Fuji, Manaka Iwami and Sayaka Ohara joining a talk show on stage.

Funimation (later Crunchyroll LLC) licensed the series for streaming in North America.

==== Episodes ====
No.	Title	Original release date
1	"I'll Never Forgive You"; Transliteration: "Omae o Yurusanai" (Japanese: お前を許さない)	April 4, 2020
Minare Koda responds to listener questions on a 3 AM radio talk show while being chased by a bear. The show flashes back to the recent past where Minare vents her feelings about her ex-boyfriend to a man she meets at a bar. The next day, Minare goes back to her job at a restaurant when she finds out the man was a radio producer named Kanetsugu Matou, who left her his business card. During her shift, she hears her own drunken rant broadcast over the radio station, playing on the speakers in the restaurant. Enraged, she abruptly leaves her shift to confront Kanetsugu at his radio station, but then gets pressed into finishing her thoughts about her ex-boyfriend live on air.
2	"I Despise Them"; Transliteration: "Yatsura ga Nikui" (Japanese: 奴らが憎い)	April 11, 2020
Minare finds herself trapped as she accidentally signed a non-disparagement agreement with Kanetsugu while drunk, and the restaurant owner threatens to fire her next month, after the local summer festival finishes, for her antics. Kantesugu and his staff believe that Minare showed some real talent on air, while Minare quickly rises in popularity among the locals and restaurant patrons. Kanetsugu offers Minare a part-time position at the radio station and reveals that he used to be a TV producer but switched to radio when he grew tired of the types of talent he was forced to promote. Minare uses her spot to promote her restaurant's stall at the festival.
3	"You All Are Soft"; Transliteration: "Omaera wa Yurui" (Japanese: お前らは緩い)	April 18, 2020
Minare is officially fired from the restaurant. After drunkenly stumbling around in and out of two different men's lives, she decides to take Kanetsugu's offer at the radio station. Minare is annoyed that Kantesugu will not discuss her pay and that she is being given a slot a 3:30 AM to do her show and the task of finding sponsors. Later, Minare is offered a room with Mizuho Nanba, an Assistant Director, who did not want her to stay in the radio station's storage room. Mizuho tells Minare that Kanetsugu's "Three Second Rule" was just an exaggeration to motivate her to speak on the air. Minare swears revenge on the radio station, but Mizuho just laughs in response.
4	"You Don't Smile"; Transliteration: "Kimi wa Warawanai" (Japanese: 君は笑わない)	April 25, 2020
5	"You're Not Getting Out Alive"; Transliteration: "Ikashite Kisanai" (Japanese: 生かして帰さない)	May 2, 2020
6	"There's No Such Thing"; Transliteration: "Sonna Mono wa Inai" (Japanese: そんなものはいない)	May 9, 2020
7	"I Want to Cry"; Transliteration: "Watashi wa Nakitai" (Japanese: 私は哭きたい)	May 16, 2020
8	"I Can't Tell You Over the Phone"; Transliteration: "Denwa ja Hanasenai" (Japanese: 電話じゃ話せない)	May 23, 2020
9	"I Won't Believe You"; Transliteration: "Omae o Shinjinai" (Japanese: お前を信じない)	May 30, 2020
10	"I Have to Do This"; Transliteration: "Watashi ga Seneba Narumai" (Japanese: 私がせねばなるまい)	June 6, 2020
11	"I Don't Fear Anaerobic Creatures"; Transliteration: "Kenkiseibutsu wa Osorenai" (Japanese: 嫌気生物は畏れない)	June 13, 2020
12	"I Want to Convey It to You"; Transliteration: "Anata ni Todoketai" (Japanese: あなたに届けたい)	June 20, 2020

=== Drama ===
A television drama adaptation was announced in February 2023, starring Fuka Koshiba as Minare Koda. The series, titled in English as Born to Be on Air!, was directed by Takashi Sumida, Osamu Katayama, and Hisashi Ueda, based on a screenplay by Kazunao Furuya, and the music was composed by Yuki Hayashi and Shōgo Yamashiro. It aired on TV Asahi and its affiliates from April 21 to June 9, 2023.

== Reception ==
Wave, Listen to Me! was nominated for the ninth, tenth and thirteenth Manga Taishō in 2016, 2017 and 2020, respectively. The series ranked 6th on Takarajimasha's Kono Manga ga Sugoi! guidebook list of 2016 top manga for male readers.
