= Women's liberation movement in Asia =

Feminist movement

The women's liberation movement in Asia was a feminist movement that started in the late 1960s and continued into the 1970s. Women's liberation movements in Asia sought to redefine women's relationships to the family and the way that women expressed their sexuality. Women's liberation in Asia also dealt with particular challenges that made the liberation movement unique in different countries.

Several countries were influenced by Western women's liberation movements, and in the case of China, ideas from the Cultural Revolution helped shape women's liberation in the West. Many Asian feminists had to straddle the line between being feminist or being "Asian." In India, the caste system affected the way that women's liberation was approached in that gender and class could rarely be separated. Similarly in Israel, the plight of Palestinian women became important in molding the views of oppression. In Japan, the movement focused on sexuality rather than equality, in an attempt to gain recognition for women's autonomy and freedom to choose their own social roles. In Singapore, South Korea and Taiwan, the liberationist movement was inspired by the worldwide movement for women's liberation and typically combined the fight against sexism with the struggle against colonialism and economic exploitation. Turkey came to the women's liberation movement later than other countries and was influenced by feminists from other countries and also by Islamic women. Turkey's struggle for women's liberation was centered around the issue of domestic violence.

== China ==
Women's status in China during the twentieth century was tied closely to the Communist Revolution there and women's social status rose quickly. Initially, Chinese people believed that the Communist Revolution would end patriarchy. During the Cultural Revolution, women were celebrated through slogans like "Women Hold Up Half the Sky", while simultaneously they were discouraged from discussing gender issues, which were seen as "reactionary". In the 1970s, new institutions that benefited and were staffed by women were created, including cafeterias, kindergartens, and nurseries. Women's rights were managed by the state itself and there was no independent feminist movement during the period. However, many of the ideas created during the revolution went on to influence women's movements in the West, as radical feminists often were politically aligned with the left. In the polarized camps of the Cold War period, socialists turned from emulating Soviet communism in the wake of Stalinist purges and invasions. Western feminists after 1960 based key ideals on Maoist theory. Slogans such as "workers of the world unite" turned into "women of the world unite" and key features like consciousness-raising and egalitarian consensus-based policies "were inspired by similar techniques used in China".

== India ==
Politics in India became radicalized in the late 1960s with numerous special-interest groups forming to address corruption and the economic crisis brought about by destructive development. By the 1970s, drought in the Maharashtra state worsened conditions for many. Peaking in 1974 with encouragement from the Navnirman Movement, women in diverse classes began to engage in direct actions to challenge leadership. The idea of "women's liberation" became a "respectable topic" in India starting in the 1970s. Women began to see that legal protections were doing very little to change the reality of their lives. Rural women who lived in poverty began to see themselves as doubly disadvantaged: both economically and through their lower social status. Women in lower castes, such as Dalits, realized that they had to fight a class battle, as well as a battle against sexism. However, most women participating in the women's liberation movement in the 1970s were middle class or part of the upper caste, and were urban and educated.

The Women's Federation of Kerala had grown to 100,000 members by 1970 and the Ganatantrik Mahila Samiti (Democratic Women's Organization) held a state conference in April 1973 in West Bengal that drew 121,632 members from nearly every district. In 1974, organizations such as the Women's Anti-Price-Rise movement in Maharashtra, the Progressive Organization of Women (POW) of Hyderabad, and the Stree Mukti Sanghatana of Bombay were formed, with women joining these leftist organizations in greater numbers. The first Democratic Women's Union conference was held in Tamil Nadu in December 1974. Student unrest and protest in Delhi sparked women to create their own human rights movement.

Creating small groups in such places as Bangalore, Bombay, Delhi, Hyderabad, Madras, and Pune, the women's groups that formed in the period were averse to authoritarian structure and utilized a collective approach to decision-making. To challenge patriarchal power in personal and political spheres, they published and reproduced articles from other countries on Women's Liberation developments throughout the world. These loosely affiliated groups networked by circulating their publications in English, as well as regional languages. In Maharashtra, differing from other areas, meetings crossed caste and class divides, including students, laborers, blue collar workers, and white collar employees. Focusing on direct action, women in these groups protested official policy in various ways. For example, an influential street performance Om Swaha enacted by Stree Mukti Sanghatana members became iconic, galvanizing women to work against dowry deaths.

Publication of the report Towards Equality in 1974 and 1975 as part of the United Nations survey on the Status of Women, revealed that women's participation in economic and political life had declined in post-Independent India. Unlike the western counterparts of the WLM, sexuality was a taboo topic in the era, though sexual violence became a focus. As such, lesbians were part of the movement, but sexual orientation was largely a private matter. In like manner, liberationists were characterized as disruptive to class-based activists who firmly believed that elimination of class differences would solve women's problems. In 1981, a group Sachetana was formed by activists in Calcutta with the goal of raising the consciousness of its members and other women. Their initial public protest was production of a play, Meye Dile Shajiye, written by member Malini Bhattacharya to protest selling brides. Unaffiliated with any political party, the group became a safe space for women of varying beliefs and political ties to openly express and discuss issues criticizing government policy and patriarchy.

After The Emergency ended in 1977 in India, membership in the women's movement swelled, which predominantly consisted up to that time of the organized, disciplined, hierarchically structured, party-affiliated groups or the leaderless, inclusive and chaotic, but autonomous groups loosely affiliated with the political left. The 1980 Forum Against Rape, held in Bombay at Cama Hall, marked a point where activists realized that multi-dimensional struggle focusing on both legal reform and raising awareness was necessary to combat systemic issues and different factions of feminists began to come together to solve issues.

== Israel ==
The women's liberation movement in Israel was initiated in the early 1970s by two American immigrants at the University of Haifa, Marcia Freedman and Marylin Safir who had both been involved in feminist activities in the United States. Seminars they held in Haifa on how women suffered from a male-dominated society quickly inspired radical activities in Tel-Aviv and Jerusalem. The first liberationist group formed in 1972, spawning formation of consciousnesses-raising groups which used direct actions as a means of addressing women's issues. Women's studies emerged which highlighted the historical contributions of Israeli women. Freedman commented: "It really wasn't that difficult translating American feminism to Israel, with many of the same issues: the ability of women to work outside the house, abortion and issues of women controlling their bodies, although on Israel a very common response was that no women's movement was needed because Israeli women were already 'liberated'."

In 1972, the radical Nilahem movement (based on an acronym meaning Women for a Renewed Society) was formed, attracting interest throughout the country with stands against legal inequality and the suffering of the Palestinians. During the 1973 Yom Kippur War, women found themselves excluded from the civilian administration, and both the military and war production efforts, being relegated to treating the wounded and supporting families. Though short in duration, the conflict brought into focus an awareness of the segregated roles of women and men in society. In that same year, Freedman became the first openly feminist member of the Knesset, supporting the Civil Rights Movement. Jerusalem liberationists saw in the movement a way to fight against all oppression, including that of the poor and Palestinians. They led actions over poor wages, women working at night, and violence against women, as well as the right to control decisions over reproduction, as did activists in Haifa and Tel Aviv.

Women's centers sprang up in metropolitan areas and by 1975, translated anthologies of US and European texts were appearing regularly in Israel. Various feminist publications appeared in the mid-1970s, including Women as Human Beings by Shulamit Aloni. In 1976, WLM members, led by Freeman, made headlines when they invaded a gynecological conference at the Hilton Tel Aviv to protest the position on abortion and were evicted by police. In 1977, the first women's shelter in Israel was founded in Haifa and the first rape crisis center was opened in Tel Aviv. That same year, a feminist publishing group The Second Sex was created and the lesbian liberationist group Aleph was founded, which led to the hosting of the first lesbian feminist conference the following year in Beersheba. By the end of the 1970s, the movement was fracturing in Israel and Aleph disbanded in 1980. The feminist periodical Nogah began publication in 1980.

== Japan ==
In Japan, the woman's liberation movement was known as ūman ribu, marking a new social and political direction for women in Japan. The name ūman ribu was itself a transliteration of English for "women's lib" and was meant to show "both the activists' solidarity with other women's liberation movements around the world and their specificity as a new Japanese women's movement". Ūman ribu differed from Western women's liberation movements in that the goals were not about equal rights, but more focused on women's roles in Japan and "called for liberation from their sex," which is known as sei no kaihō.

Women in the movement felt that dealing with sexual desire (seiyoku) was important and defining for the movement itself. Women such as Iwatsuki Sumie (also known as Asatori Sumie), wrote about menstruation taboos. She was also instrumental in creating women's spaces and was known for her advocacy of lesbian relationships. Activist Tomoko Yonezu started Thought Group SEX, which also explored disability and sexual liberation. Sexual liberation for Tomoko and Tanaka didn't mean "free sex" (furii sekkusu), but instead focused on a liberation of women's sexuality. In addition, the sense of autonomy over their own bodies meant that ūman ribu activist opposed efforts to restrict abortion and which emphasized creating a society where women "want to give birth".

Women in Japan were considered "second-class citizens in society in general, within social movements [...], and in the family". Women involved in the movement were critical both of the literal modern family system and also of political movement that attempted to frame women's roles in politics in familial terminology. Within the movement, Japanese women also attempted to rehabilitate the word, onna, for woman, which had become a derogatory way to refer to women, but one that did not have familial connotations. Women involved in this women's liberation movement felt that they were different from people who were feminisuto (feminist) which they felt only applied to academics involved in women's studies. Many of the women involved in the ūman ribu movement were young and had been involved in New Left groups in the 1960s.

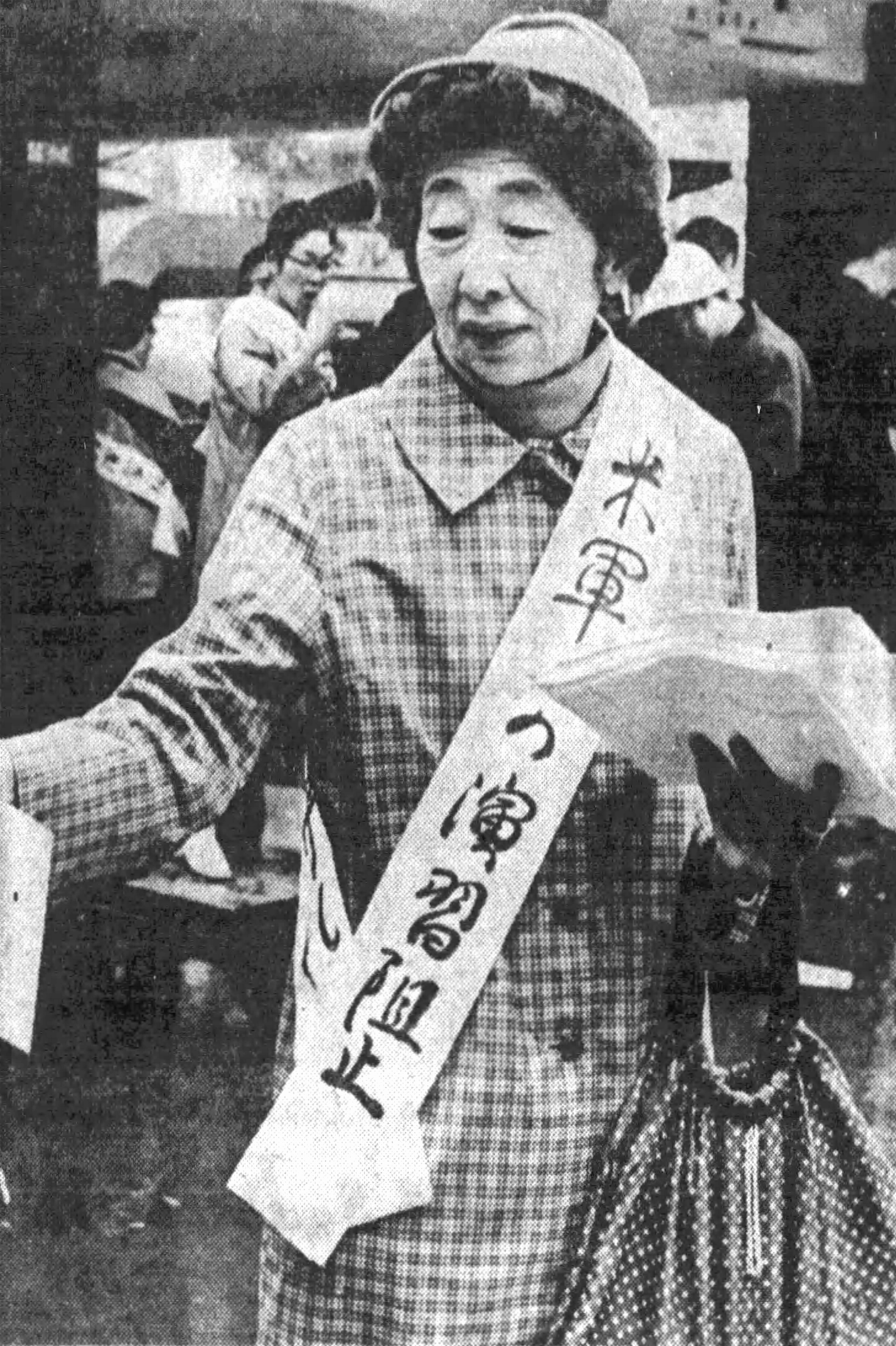
Yoko Matsuoka leads a women's rights protest in Tokyo, 1970

Groups began to appear in cities throughout Japan in April 1970. These groups were not hierarchical and had no central leadership. Starting in late 1970, an organization called Gurũpu tatakau onna (Group of Fighting Women) began to work towards women's liberation throughout Japan. Women met to discuss Tanaka Mitsu's work, Liberation from the Toilet and also to advocate for a change in laws. Tanaka chose to use the word "toilet" because women could be described as "little more than repositories of men's bodily fluids," or metaphorically speaking, as a convenience to men. In August 1970, a conference hosted by Yoko Matsuoka and Aiko Iijima at Hosei University attracted over 1,000 participants. Matsuoka, Yayori Matsui and others were members of the Ajia Josei Kaihō (Asian Women's Liberation Group). Another ūman ribu publication was Onna erosu, which started in the 1970s and had a diverse perspective on social movements. The ūman ribu anthology for women in Japan came out in 1972 and was called Onna's Thought. The first public rally for ūman ribu took place on International Anti-War Day, October 21, 1970. In 1973, Tokyo activists created a public demonstration against Mother's Day. The activists had a banner that read "Mother's Day, what a laugh!" and critiqued the value of mothers, wives and children in Japanese society.

Communes were started by ūman ribu activists in the early 1970s throughout Japan, including the best-known commune of Ribu Shinjuku Centre in Tokyo. Various groups, including the Gurūpu tatakau onna, Thought Group SEX, Tokyo Komu-unu, Alliance of Fighting Women and Scarlet Letter helped establish the Ribu Shinjuku Centre. The centre was not only a central location for organizing and communicating, but also served as women's shelter. The women's liberation movement in Japan continued past the 1970s, but not with using the same terminology and methods.

== Singapore ==
Nalla Tan called for a council of women to be formed to advocate for women's rights in Singapore in 1972. The women's liberation movement in Singapore was energized in 1975, during the observance of the International Women's Year. That same year the National Council of Women (NCW) was formed in order to coordinate the activities of women's groups in the country and to help end discrimination against women. In 1983, the "Great Marriage Debate" began a conversation about eugenics, motherhood and the need for feminism in Singapore. Young people were encouraged to marry and have children by the government which was worried about the falling fertility rate in the country. The National University of Singapore Society held a forum in November 1984 that responded to the issues raised in the "Great Marriage Debate." Zaibun Siraj and Vivienne Wee organized the forum called "Women's Choices, Women's Lives" and brought speakers such as Kanwaljit Soin, Hedwig Anuar and Margaret Thomas.

The first feminist organization in Singapore, the Association of Women for Action and Research (AWARE) was created in 1985 in response to the issues raised at the "Women's Choices, Women's Lives" forum. Members of AWARE were concerned about not being associated with negative stereotypes of feminism and balanced their feminism with "Asian values." AWARE publicly focused on issues they called "women's rights" and "gender inequality". They did not explicitly or publicly blame women's roles in society on men, but rather as "product of history and tradition," and that gender inequality affected both men and women in society. Privately and in unpublished reports, members thought of themselves as feminists.

== South Korea ==
The first women's organizations in South Korea arose from worker's struggles under the dictatorship of Park Chung-hee and were focused on poor working conditions and exploitation of women in the family under a system which required women to work to pay for their brothers' educations and support their families. In 1975, Yi Hyo-jae (Korean: 李効再), a professor at Ewha Womans University (EWU) began to criticize existing women's organizations in Korea as being too focused on legal change for women rather than liberation of women from societal ideas of what women should be. As western literature, like The Second Sex by Simone de Beauvoir and then The Feminine Mystique by Betty Friedan and Sexual Politics by Kate Millett were translated into Korean in 1973, followed by Woman's Estate by Juliet Mitchell, Korean intellectuals had become aware of the ideas of radical feminists. By 1977, a women's studies department was established at EWU. The development of the course utilized students' input and also requested material relating to the courses from 150 universities in the United States with women's studies classes. The women's studies department was criticized for relying too heavily on Western ideas, but there was a "strong interest" from students in the classes. The feminist movement, known as Minjung feminism, which developed in South Korea in the 1980s merged worker concerns with liberationist ideas within the broader fight against dictatorship.

== Taiwan ==
One of Taiwan's feminists, Hsiu-lien Annette Lu, was inspired by the women's liberation movement in the United States. In 1974, Lu published New Feminism which advocated for women to come together to end "the dominant patriarchal paradigm". Yang Mei-hui translated Margaret Mead's Sex and Temperament in Three Primitive Societies (1935), which introduced the concept of gender role formation to Chinese-speaking women in Taiwan. This translation was also an influence on Lu, whose followers established the Awakening Foundation and began publishing the Awakening Magazine in 1982. Lu also wove Confucian philosophy into her feminist discourse to promote a cultural basis for addressing double standards for men and women. By utilizing maxims such as "Do not impose on others what you yourself do not desire", she developed the theme of mutual respect for women.

== Turkey ==
Student movements focusing on anti-imperialism began to appear in Turkey in the 1960s and leftist movements began to form in the 1970s. However, women's concerns were not dealt with by many of these groups and women were actively discouraged from discussing them. The women's liberation movement really began to flourish in the 1980s. Women who had been involved in these leftist groups started to talk about feminism and created consciousness-raising groups where they shared their own experiences as women with one another. Many of the early feminists in Turkey were educated, often professional, middle class and who had links to feminists in other countries. Because of women's very marginalized position in Turkey, the movement went unnoticed until "a substantial, organized feminist movement grew out of these small groups." One of the significant groups was called Kadin Çevresi (Women's Circle). Kadin Çevresi translated and published books by significant feminist writers. Translations were also published on the feminist page of Somut, a weekly magazine, which began in 1983. As the books become translated, women would form book clubs and hold book discussions. In addition to translating, women were also bringing new words into the Turkish language to describe issues they dealt with, such as "male domination" (erkek egemenliği), creating a feminist language that could help the movement grow. Women in the movement criticized the Kemalist model of modernity in Turkey and focused on how women are forced to play roles within this modern world. Muslim women were also involved in the movement, encouraging women of the Islam faith to speak out about their experiences. Secular feminists and Islamic women in Turkey had an influence on each other during this time. Some, like Sibel Eraslan described herself as "a feminist with faith." Secular feminists who were involved in the journal, Pazartesi, were supportive of Muslim women "who wanted to redefine their identities as women."

By the mid-1980s, women were holding WLM protests in Istanbul and Ankara. These feminists were united around the issue of domestic violence instead of abortion, since abortion was already legal in Turkey. Activists kept track of court proceedings that "gave explicit legitimacy to domestic violence" and protested either by sending letters to the judge or by setting up rallies. There was "enthusiastic turnout" for a protest organized in May 1987 against domestic violence and the government's lack of action towards the issue. A following event, a "1 day festival in October of the same year" helped boost women's confidence in their actions.

The women's movement of the 1980s allowed feminist policies and groups to continue to grow in the 1990s and 2000s. The Women's Library and Information Center and the Purple Roof Women's Shelter Foundation were both founded in 1990. Purple Roof worked hard to maintain autonomous control and rejected attempts of the state to "subvert the feminist meaning of their endeavor." One of the major contributors and founders of Purple Roof is Canan Arin.

== See also ==
- Women's liberation movement in Europe
- Women's liberation movement in North America
- Women's liberation movement in Oceania
- Feminism in China
- Feminism in Taiwan
- Feminism in South Korea
- Feminism in Japan
- Aurat March
