= Hunchback (novella) =

2025 novel by Saou Ichikawa

- Author: Saou Ichikawa
- Translator: Polly Barton (English)
- Language: Japanese
- Genre: Disability fiction
- Publisher: Bungeishunju (Japanese); Hogarth Press (English)
- Publication date: June 22, 2023 (Japanese); March 18, 2025 (English)
- Publication place: Japan
- Pages: 96 (Japanese); 90 (English)
- ISBN: 9784163917122

Hunchback (ハンチバック, Hanchibakku) is a 2023 debut novel by Japanese writer Saou Ichikawa. It was originally serialized in Bungakukai in May 2023 before being published in book form by Bungeishunjū on June 22, 2023. The novel proceeded to win the Akutagawa Prize on July 19, 2023, making Ichikawa the first-ever disabled author to win one.

An English translation by Polly Barton was released by Hogarth Press, which holds North American rights to the title, on March 18, 2025. Viking Press holds world English rights. Barton's translation was longlisted for the International Booker Prize and the National Book Award for Translated Literature.

== Synopsis ==
The book follows Izawa Shaka, a woman in a group care facility who suffers from myotubular myopathy and writes pornography. It extrapolates on her thoughts on a variety of different topics including but not limited to Tomoko Yonezu's vandalism of the Mona Lisa at the Tokyo National Museum, Nietzschean thought, and disability studies in relation to the films of David Lynch, among others.

== Critical reception ==
Due to its groundbreaking revelation of disabled life in Japan, as well as its awarding of the Akutagawa Prize, some critics have considered Hunchback to be one of the most important works of Japanese literature in the twenty-first century. Keiichiro Hirano, who was a judge for the Akutagawa Prize in 2023, stated that there was "overwhelming support" for the novel's strength and its critique of ableism in civil society.

In a starred review, Publishers Weekly called the book a "provocative debut" and a "damning critique of Japanese cultural norms." The reviewer ultimately found Shaka "a deeply human character" by dint of her "desire and wit."

The New York Times observed themes of "survival" in Shaka's life encased in Ishikawa's "plain, uncharged language, rendering them all the more shocking to a reader who may never have considered the limits of what a body like hers must cope with."

The Guardian called Ichikawa a "transgressive" Japanese writer and concluded that she "uses the vantage point of her disability for a particular insight into human nature, but we mustn’t condescend to call this novella autobiographical. Its structure—beginning and ending with a story, the latter possibly written by the narrator, possibly not—would tease us if we do." The reviewer also lauded Barton's "deft translation."

Datebook lauded Ichikawa's "scathing takedown of ableism in modern society" and her critiques of desire rendered through Shaka's unflinching and raw voice: "It's a stunning portrait of a broken body and wildly alive spirit that reminds us not only of our frailty but of our indelible strength when tested."

Radio Times listed the book in twelfth place in a list of the 20 best upcoming books of 2025. Electric Literature included it in an anticipated translations list for the winter and spring of 2025.
