= Nanoka Hara =

Japanese actress (born 2003)

- 原 菜乃華
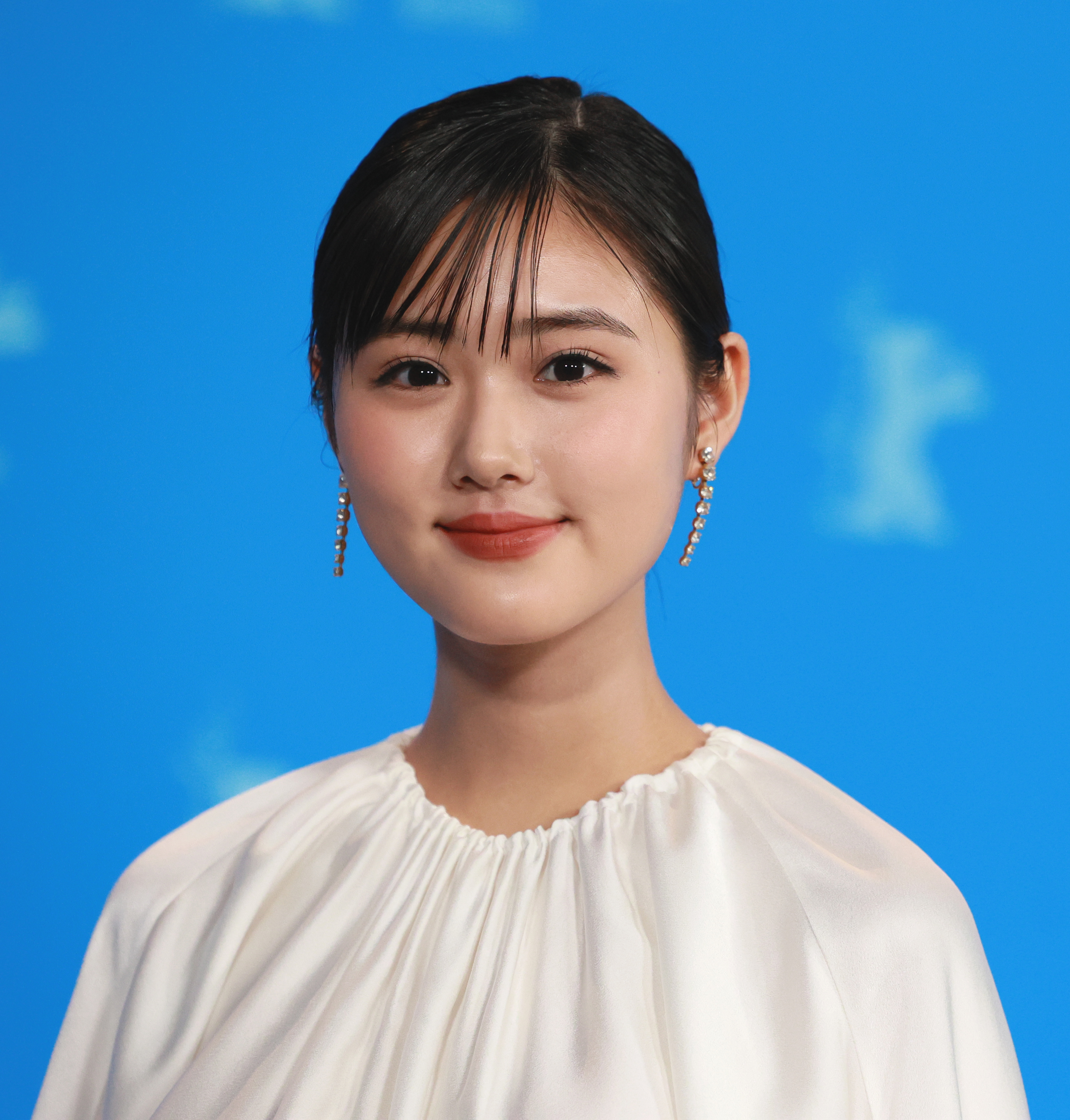
- Hara at the 73rd Berlin International Film Festival in 2023
- Born: August 26, 2003 (age 23)
- Occupation: Actress
- Years active: 2009–present
- Employer: Tristone Entertainment
- Notable work: Suzume as Suzume Iwato; Born to Be On Air! as Mizuho Nanba; Don't Call It Mystery as Shioji Kariatsumari

Nanoka Hara (Japanese: 原 菜乃華, Hepburn: Hara Nanoka; born August 26, 2003) is a Japanese actress from Tokyo, affiliated with Tristone Entertainment. After passing the J-beans Net Scout Audition in 2009, she began a career in acting, before voicing the titular main character of Suzume (2022), Suzume Iwato. Since then, she has starred as Mizuho Nanba in Born to Be On Air! (2023) and Shioji Kariatsumari in Don't Call It Mystery (2023).

== Biography ==
Nanoka Hara, a native of Tokyo, was born on 26 August 2003. She began her acting career after passing the J-beans Net Scout Audition in 2009, and she appeared in Kaiken (2016), Oha Suta (2016), and Opening Night (2017).

On 5 July 2022, Hara was revealed as the voice of Suzume Iwato, the main character of the 2022 film Suzume. Makoto Shinkai, the director of Suzume, selected her from an audition involving more than 1,700 people. Hara has been a fan of Shinkai's works, remarking that she could not imagine being the one to share the "unforgettable, heart-shaking sensation" she felt when first seeing one of his films in theaters. Suzume was Hara's first anime voice-acting role. In March 2024, she was one of the recipients of the Best New Actor Award at the 18th Seiyu Awards.

In March 2023, she was cast as Mizuho Nanba in the drama adaptation of Born to Be On Air!, then Shioji Kariatsumari in the film adaptation of Don't Call It Mystery – both released the same year. In August 2023, it was announced that she would star in the NHK taiga drama What Will You Do, Ieyasu?, as a fictional depiction of the Tokugawa clan aristocrat Senhime. On October 30, she released her first photo book Hana no Iro (はなのいろ).

== Filmography ==
=== Films ===
Year	Title	Role	Notes	Ref.
2010	BOX: The Hakamada Case	Norimichi's eldest daughter		
2013	Why Don't You Play in Hell?	Mitsuko Moto (young)		
2015	Pirameki's Children Story	Yui Sagawa		
2017	March Comes In like a Lion	Kyōko Kōda (young)		
2017	March Goes Out like a Lamb	Kyōko Kōda (young)		
2017	Opening Night	Herself	Lead role	
2018	Mugen Foundation	Nanoka		
2020	The Voice of Sin	Nozomi Ikushima		
2021	My Heart Beats	Mayu Hasebe		
2022	Hell Dogs	Hiromi Mamiya		
2022	Suzume	Suzume Iwato (voice)	Lead role	
2023	Don't Call It Mystery	Shioji Kariatsumari		
2024	Lovesick Ellie	Eriko "Ellie" Ichimura	Lead role	
2024	Oshi no Ko: The Final Act	Kana Arima		
2024	Cha-Cha			
2025	The Girl Who Sees	Miko Yotsuya	Lead role	
2025	Babanba Banban Vampire	Aoi Shinozuka		
2025	Dive in Wonderland	Rise (voice)	Lead role	
2026	You, Fireworks, and Our Promise	Aki Hayama (voice)		
2026	How to Generate a Perfect Crime	Sara Hatsuumi		
2026	A Bouquet of Light for You	Eiko Someya	Lead role	

=== TV dramas ===
Year	Title	Role	Notes	Ref.
2013	Proof of Lies	Riko Hirano		
2013	Gekai Hatomura Shugoro	Mariya Hoshino	Season 11	
2013	xxxHolic	Himawari Kunogi (young)		
2013	Husband's Lover	Sakura		
2014	Minowa: Love and Law	Kana Minowa		
2016	Comes Morning	Hikari Katakura (young)		
2016	The Price	Mika Kizaki	Episode 2 – 4	
2019	Two Homelands	Haruko Amaha		
2019	Babysitter Gin	Yuka Ueda	Episode 3	
2020	MIU404	Su	Episode 7	
2021	Night Doctor	Kokomi Fukazawa		
2021–22	Guilty Flag	Hikari Sagara	2 seasons	
2022	Class Crush	Anna Sakamoto	Season 2; episode 3	
2022	Nanba MG5	Ginko Nanba		
2022	Murai in Love	Fukunaga Yayoi		
2023	Born to Be On Air!	Mizuho Nanba		
2023	Komugi's Full Stomach Record	Tachibana Komugi	Lead role; miniseries	
2023	Muddy Dining Table	Chifuyu Ozaki		
2023	What Will You Do, Ieyasu?	Senhime	Taiga drama	
2024	Tales of the Unusual: Summer 2024	Rin Fujisaki	Lead role; short drama	
2024	Oshi no Ko	Kana Arima		
2025	Anpan	Meiko Asada	Asadora	
2025	Chihayafuru: Full Circle	Nagi Tsukiura		
2026	Lunacy	Runa Goda	Lead role	
2026	Cut, Dad! Are We the "Best" Family?	Kiko Tarayama	Lead role	
2026	The Nurse X	Miku Wakamatsu		

=== Other television ===
Year	Title	Notes	Ref.
2025	76th NHK Kōhaku Uta Gassen	She sang several songs with her co-stars from the TV series Anpan.	

=== Radio ===
Year	Title	Notes	Ref.
2026	Canmake presents Hara Nanoka NanoRadi	As host	

== Awards and nominations ==
Year	Award	Category	Work(s)	Result	Ref.
2024	47th Japan Academy Film Prize	Newcomer of the Year	Don't Call It Mystery	Won	
2024	18th Seiyu Awards	Best New Actor	Suzume	Won	
