= Butter (novel) =

2017 thriller novel by Asako Yuzuki

- Author: Asako Yuzuki
- Original title: バター
- Translator: Polly Barton
- Language: Japanese
- Genre: Fiction, Thriller, Mystery, Literary
- Publisher: Shinchosha (Japan), Fourth Estate (UK), Ecco (US)
- Publication date: 2017 (Japan), February 2024 (UK & US)
- Publication place: Japan
- Media type: Print, eBook
- Awards: Waterstones Book of the Year (2024)

Butter (バター, Batā) is a 2017 Japanese novel by Asako Yuzuki. The story, inspired by a real-life serial murder case in Japan, follows a Tokyo journalist who starts interviewing a woman accused of tricking and possibly killing men by seducing them with her cooking, believed to be poisoned.

Originally published by Shinchosha in 2017, Butter was nominated for the Naoki Prize that year. An English translation by Polly Barton was published in 2024 (Fourth Estate in the UK and Ecco in the US). It was Yuzuki's first work translated to English. It became a bestseller and the Waterstones Book of the Year in 2024. It sold over 280,000 copies in Britain.

== Plot ==
Rika Machida, a young reporter at a weekly magazine, aims to write a big story about Manako Kajii, a woman in her 30s held in a detention centre in Tokyo for the suspected murder of three single, divorced men, all of whom were significantly older than her at their age of death. Kajii, a skilled home cook, is said to have seduced her victims with her gourmet, home-cooked meals, which she catalogued on her blog. The case was highly publicized, with newspapers zeroing in on the voluptuous Kajii’s weight and appearance. Although many reporters try to speak with her, Kajii refuses all interviews.

Rika’s best friend from university, Reiko, is undergoing unsuccessful fertility treatment. The formerly ambitious Reiko has now become a housewife, hoping the lack of stress will help her conceive, focusing all her attention on cooking. On Reiko’s suggestion, Rika writes to Kajii asking for the recipe of her famous beef stew, the last meal the final victim ate, finally making her agree to an interview.

Kajii and Rika begin a series of meetings, with Kajii instructing the underweight Rika to eat "real food", all of it involving expensive butter, and to begin cooking for herself. All the food Rika prepares, as well as restaurant meals, are described in great detail. Kajii, a believer in strict traditional gender norms, shares her negative outlook on feminism and society with Rika, slowly sharing bits and pieces of her life with her. She encourages Rika to chase her own pleasure, mocking the strict Japanese expectations of weight and dieting, as well as encouraging her to enjoy herself sexually.

Rika gains weight due to her newfound love for cooking and gourmet cuisine. Her personal life, previously marked by an unsatisfying relationship, undergoes changes. Her weight gain is incessantly commented on at the office, causing her to reflect on Japan’s strict beauty standards. Reiko unravels psychologically, telling Rika she should have never quit her job. She joins Rika on her research, helping her track down Kajii’s family to see how much she claims is actually true.

Over the course of the assignment, Reiko and Rika reflect on womanhood, pleasure and societal expectations in Japan, as well as their own adolescent and adult experiences. Kajii’s family, living in a rural house riddled with fleas, tells them that she was a strange, unattractive teen, with the only man interested in her being a sex offender thrice her age. Rika and Reiko attend the same culinary school Kajii did, emulating more and more of her recipes. Her final, unfulfilled recipe would have been a large Thanksgiving turkey, enough to feed a large group of people.

Rika gathers this information and returns to Tokyo, preparing to confront Kajii with it. Reiko tells Rika she needs a few days to herself and will be home soon. Unbeknownst to Rika, Reiko has secretly been in contact with Kajii, who she fears is putting Rika under her spell. Rika confronts Kajii with her lies, relating her hatred of modern women with her botched framing of past relationships, saying she became the way she is because she never had a real female friend. An upset Kajii tells her she never wants to speak to her again, with Rika responding that this would mean losing her only friend.

Reiko’s husband contacts Rika, terrified as Reiko is nowhere to be found. He tells Rika that their marriage, seemingly perfect, was crumbling under the pressure of fertility treatments and lack of intimacy. Rika promises to find Reiko. Instead of visiting family as she claims, Reiko has gone to live with one of Kajii’s former partners, who testified for her in court. The man, who Reiko met online, believes her lie about being a domestic violence victim, letting her stay with him for a few days.

Her plan to have him validate her emotional needs by loving and caring for her after she cooks and cleans for him falls flat. Rika organizes an apartment for the unresponsive and depressed Reiko after being able to contact her. Rika realizes her own loneliness, longing for a large apartment she could frequently host in.

Rika publishes her article to great acclaim. A vindictive Kajii, now dating a tabloid journalist, puts out a statement decrying Rika, claiming she sexually harassed her and became overly obsessed with her life, trying to emulate her. This culminates in a media frenzy, with Rika receiving the same hateful and misogynistic comments as Kajii did. Rika decides to use her savings to buy a large apartment, despite not being promoted.

The book ends with Kajii’s retrial. Rika reflects on how she could have been intimidated by someone who now seems so weak. She concludes that she is happy with her current weight, even though she is no longer viewed as slim. Rika invites her loved ones to her new apartment, making the turkey recipe Kajii never got to finish.

== Reception ==
The English translation of Butter received strong commercial and critical attention in the United Kingdom. Released in February 2024, the novel sold over 280,000 copies in the U.K., exceeding its original sales in Japan. It was selected as the Waterstones Book of the Year 2024, chosen from a shortlist curated by staff from the retailer's approximately 300 locations. The translation by Polly Barton, which uses British English, has been marked as a factor that helped the book to be welcomed by the English speakers.

In a review for The Guardian, Josh Weeks called the novel "sharp and sometimes thrilling", praising how it explores the social stigma of obesity, eating, and the complex link between food and trauma. He also noted that Butter gives a strong critique of the unrealistic beauty standards for women in Japan. The Times described Butter as a rich and unusual blend of murder mystery and food writing. The Chicago Review of Books praised Butter as "compelling and intensely readable", especially for how it unites a murder mystery with a "love letter to fine dining". The book was also featured and reviewed on the BBC talk show Between the Covers, hosted by Sara Cox.
