= Gyutto =

2020 single by Mosawo

Single by Mosawo

from the album Koi no Uta
- Language: Japanese
- Released: July 27, 2020
- Length: 4:29
- Label: Independent
- Songwriter: Mosawo
- Producers: Nyonz Tanaka; Mosawo

Mosawo singles chronology
"Gyutto" (2020)	"Kira Kira" (2020)

Music videos
- "Gyutto" on YouTube

"Gyutto" (Japanese: ぎゅっと。; lit. 'tightly') is the debut single by the Japanese singer Mosawo, released independently on July 27, 2020. It became popular among Generation Z couples during the COVID-19 pandemic in Japan.

== Background and release ==
In March 2020, Mosawo posted a video of himself singing a single phrase of the song on TikTok. In May, he released the full version of the song on YouTube and released the song digitally on July 27. The song was the debut single of Mosawo. A live action music video was released in March 2021 created by Raidai Kuramoto.

== Composition ==
The song lyrics is about "wanting to be with someone you love." Despite Mosawo being a male, the song was in a female perspective. He said that he tried to make the song "easier to understand so people can empathize with the song" and "warm but a bit sad".

In an interview with Pia Corporation, Mosawo said that he purposely switched between "Watashi" (私; lit. 'I') and "Atashi" (あたし; lit. 'Myself'), he uses "Atashi" when singing the "feeling for him" while he uses "Watashi" when singing about the "innermost feelings", he also revealed that the line in chorus "Hold me Tight with Your Big Body" (あなたの大きな身体でぎゅっと, Anata no Ōkina Karada de Gyutto) that the "Body" (身体, Karada) refers of both the "Body and the Mind".

The song's tempo is 120 BPM. The opening part of the song was played with a Wurlitzer organ and acoustic guitar.

== Critical reception ==
Chinami Hachisuka of Music Natalie commented that the song has many memorable lyrics, adding that the "song touched the hearts of many people." She also noted that Mosawo's singing voice is "warm", and concluded that the "composition is simple yet well thought out."

Aki Ito of Real Sound, praised the melody of the song, adding that it is "easier to remember"; he added that the rhythm was simple. He also praised the usage of pronouns of the song. He concluded the "catchy elements" are "arranged in a great balance".

Ayaka Sakai of Billboard Japan noted that the song is "perfect fit" during the COVID-19 Pandemic and praised Mosawo's use of female perspective.

== Commercial performance ==
The song became popular among Generation Z in Japan during the COVID-19 pandemic mostly couples who could not meet due to the lockdown and use the song to cope because of its lyrics. The song was used as background music in various couple and pet videos across TikTok. It was used in over 30,000 videos, and accumulated 300 million views on TikTok. In July 2021, the song exceeded 100 million streams on Billboard Japan. It debuted second in Spotify Top 50 in Japan. It debuted first in Line Music's weekly ranking.

The song debuted at 31th place in Billboard Japan's Streaming Song chart and stayed at Top 100 for 42 consecutive weeks. It charted in Oricon's Combined Single chart 30 times and peaked at 32nd place, while it charted in Oricon's Top Streaming chart 96 times and peaked at 16th place.

== Charts ==
=== Weekly charts ===
Weekly chart performance for "Gyutto"
Chart (2020)	Peak position
Japan (Japan Hot 100)	34
Japan Combined Single (Oricon)	33

=== Year-end charts ===
2020 year-end chart performance for "Gyutto"
Chart (2020)	Position
Japan Streaming Songs (Billboard Japan)	77

2021 year-end chart performance for "Gyutto"
Chart (2021)	Position
Japan Streaming Songs (Billboard Japan)	86

== See also ==
- Impact of the COVID-19 pandemic on the music industry
