= Saou Ichikawa =

Japanese writer (born 1979)

- 市川 沙央
- Born: September 27, 1979 (age 47)
- Education: Waseda University
- Occupation: Writer
- Notable work: Hunchback
- Awards: Akutagawa Prize (2023)

Saou Ichikawa (市川 沙央, Ichikawa Saō; born 1979) is a Japanese writer. She is best known for her debut novel Hunchback, for which she won the Akutagawa Prize in 2023.

== Biography ==
Ichikawa was born September 27, 1979. She has congenital myopathy and uses a wheelchair and a respirator, the latter of which she has used since the age of 13. She has an older sister, who also has congenital myopathy. She decided to become a novelist when she was 20 years old, as she felt her career options were limited due to her disability. She first began to write light novels, but grew discouraged after a light novel she wrote failed to win a prize, and decided to instead write serious fiction. She graduated from Waseda University. She grew up reading the Paddington Bear books by Michael Bond and the St. Clare's books by Enid Blyton; she named Dostoyevsky's The Idiot and Hermann Hesse's Siddhartha as having influenced her.

At university, she began to research the representation of disabled people in literature, which inspired the writing of her novel Hunchback, about a profoundly disabled woman, Izawa, who pays her male caretaker to have sex with her. Hunchback was published in 2023. The novel was well-received: it sold 230,000 copies and The Japan Times described it as "dark and funny". She is the first disabled writer to win the Akutagawa Prize. Novelist Keiichiro Hirano, who was on the jury for the Akutagawa Prize that year, stated that the book "knocks down conventional wisdom and common sense centered on able-bodied people". Viking Press acquired the English rights to the novel, and a translation by Polly Barton was released in 2025. The translation received starred reviews from both Publishers Weekly and Kirkus Reviews, both of which praised the social commentary of the novel. The English translation was longlisted for the International Booker Prize; the judges praised Hunchback for its criticism of ableism and sexism.

== Works ==
- Träumerei's dream (トロイメライのみる夢は), 2018 (not yet translated)
- Hunchback (ハンチバック), 2023
- Ophelia no. 23 (オフィーリア23号), 2024 (not yet translated)
- Pick up a Konpeitou (こんぺいとを拾う), 2024 (not yet translated)
- Suicide the heartbeat (音の心中), 2024 (not yet translated)
- Girl's spine (女の子の背骨), 2025 (not yet translated)
- Conscientious objection (良心的兵役拒否), 2025 (not yet translated) (serialized)
  - #1 Looking back at the witty phrases (洒落た文句に振り返りゃ)
  - #2 Mama (ママ)
  - #3 Balloon papa (風船のパパ)
- Evil role (悪のロール), 2025 (not yet translated)
- Pow(d)er (Pow(d)er), 2025 (not yet translated)
- Luck (運), 2025 (not yet translated)

== Awards and recognition ==
- 2023: Bungakukai Prize for New Writers for Hunchback
- 2023: Akutagawa Prize for Hunchback
- 2025: Longlisted for the International Booker Prize for Hunchback
