= Akihisa Shiono =

Japanese actor and model (born 1995)

- 塩野 瑛久
- Shiono at the 39th Tokyo International Film Festival in 2026
- Born: January 3, 1995 (age 31); Tokyo, Japan
- Occupation: Actor
- Years active: 2012 - present
- Agents: Oscar Promotion (2012 - 2021); LDH (2021 - present)

Akihisa Shiono (塩野 瑛久, Shiono Akihisa; born January 3, 1995, in Tokyo) is a Japanese actor. He played the role of Souji Rippukan/Kyoryu Green in the 2013 Super Sentai TV series Zyuden Sentai Kyoryuger.

== Biography ==
After graduating junior high school, Shiono helped his parents' restaurant instead of going to high school. While recommended from the store customers and his mother, he was a candidate in the 24th Junon Super Boy contest, which was held in 2011, he was awarded the Special Jury Prize and the Prize Aoki.

In March 2012, Shiono became affiliated with Oscar Promotion. In 2013, he appeared in Zyuden Sentai Kyoryuger as Souji Rippukan/Kyoryu Green. In the film Zyuden Sentai Kyoryuger Returns: Hundred Years After, he played Soujiro.

In 2016, Shiono performed the starring role of Masamune Date in Sengoku Basara 4 Sumeragi play.

In November 2017, Shiono became vice leader of Aoyama Omotesando X Male Troupe.

On 6 April 2019, Shiono played Kansuke Yamamoto role in Shingen-ko festival. Kansuke Yamamoto was known as a brilliant strategist and particularly known for his plan which led to victory in the fourth battle of Kawanakajima. Shingen-ko is the Guinness-registered Largest Samurai Festival in all over the world. Also, Shiono met Nagasaki Prefectural Governor to discuss about this important traditional festival on 5 April.

On 28 February 2021, Shiono left Oscar Promotion and Aoyama Omotesando X. On 12 August 2021, Shiono joined LDH Japan.

Shiono's hobbies are playing tennis and he is good at cooking crêpe. He has a motorcycle license.

== Filmography ==
=== TV series ===
Year	Title	Role	Other notes	Ref.
2013	Zyuden Sentai Kyoryuger	Souji Rippukan/Kyoryu Green		
2015	Sachi to Mayu	Ryosuke Ida	Television film	
2016	Halo Halo House	Hideto Yamaguchi		
2016	Baby Steps	Miyagawa Takuya		
2018	Mob Psycho 100 Live-action	Daichi Shiratori		
2018	Stardust Revengers	Yuya Hayami		
2018	Prince of Legend	Seiichiro Kuon		
2018	Sakura no Oyakodon Season 2	Kaoru Omameuda		
2023	Tengu no Daidokoro	Yui Atago		
2024	Dear Radiance	Emperor Ichijō	Taiga drama	
2024–27	Golden Kamuy: The Hunt of Prisoners in Hokkaido / Karafuto Pursuit Arc	Kantarō Okuyama	2 seasons	
2026	Akane-banashi	Kaisei Arakawa (voice)		

=== Films ===
Year	Title	Role	Other notes	Ref.
2014	We are a Bounty Hunter Team	Midori Shintaro		
2015	Use the Eyeballs/Hana Medama Kotaro no Koi	Kotaro Hanada	Lead role	
2016	Pieces of the Future	Kazuki Miura	Short film	
2017	Candy Boys 2	Iketchi		
2018	Does the Flower Blossom?	Hiroki Fujimoto		
2024	Hakkenden: Fiction and Reality	Ōgigayatsu Sadamasa		
2024	Cha-Cha	Mamoru		
2026	Golden Kamuy: The Abashiri Prison Raid	Kantarō Okuyama		
2026	Sakamoto Days	Kashima		
2026	Magical Secret Tour	Takashi		
2026	Love≠Comedy			
2026	All the Lovers in the Night	Ohashi		

=== Stages ===
Year	Title	Role	Other notes	Ref.
2014	Junpei, Kangaenaose	Junpei	Lead role	
2016	Sengoku Basara 4 Sumeragi	Masamune Date	Lead role	
2016	Sengoku Basara 4 Sumeragi: Honnoji Incident	Masamune Date	Lead role	
2016	Small Wedding Ceremony: Someday a good wind blows	Takumi Akikawa		
2016	Detective Conan x Live Mystery: Labyrinth on the Sea	Hideto Todo		
2017	Furu Amerika ni Sode wa Nurasaji	Koyama		
