= Aoko Matsuda =

Japanese writer and translator

- 松田青子
- Born: October 11, 1979 (age 47)
- Education: Doshisha University
- Occupation: writer
- Writing career
- Genre: Fiction

Aoko Matsuda (松田青子 Matsuda Aoko; born October 11, 1979) is a Japanese writer and translator. She is the winner of the 2021 World Fantasy Award—Collection.

== Biography ==
Aoko Matsuda was born in 1979, in Hyōgo Prefecture. She is an alumna of the Doshisha University, where she studied English.

She made her debut in 2007. Her first collection of short stories, Stackable, was nominated for the Mishima Yukio and Noma Literary New Face Prize (2013). Her stories have appeared in such literary magazines as Granta and Monkey Business. In 2019, the English translation of her short story titled The Woman Dies was included in the shortlist for the Shirley Jackson Award. Two years later, the English translation of Matsuda's short story collection called Where the Wild Ladies Are won in the Collection category of the World Fantasy Awards and in the Fiction category of the Firecracker Awards.

Matsuda has translated from English into Japanese, including literary works by Karen Russell, Amelia Gray and Carmen Maria Machado.

== Awards and honors ==
Awards for Matsuda's writing
Year	Title	Award	Result	Ref.
2013	Stackable	Mishima Yukio Prize	Nominee	
2013	Stackable	Noma Literary New Face Prize	Nominee	
2019	The Woman Dies	Shirley Jackson Award	Shortlist	
2020	Where the Wild Ladies Are	Los Angeles Times Book Prize, Ray Bradbury Prize	Nominee	
2021	Where the Wild Ladies Are	Firecracker Award for Fiction	Winner	
2021	Where the Wild Ladies Are	World Fantasy Award for Collection	Winner	

== Publications ==
=== Books ===
- スタッキング可能 (in Japanese). 河出書房新社. 2016. ISBN 9784309414690.
- おばちゃんたちのいるところ [Where the Wild Ladies Are] (in Japanese). 中央公論新社. 2016. ISBN 9784120049187.

=== Short stories and novellas ===
- "Smartening Up". Granta. Translated by Polly Barton. 2014-06-11.
- The Girl Who Is Getting Married. Translated by Angus Turvill. Strangers Press. 2017.
- "The Woman Dies". Granta. Translated by Polly Barton. 2018-11-02.
- "Enoki". Granta. Translated by Polly Barton. 2020-02-17.
