= Fumino Kimura =

Japanese actress

- 木村 文乃
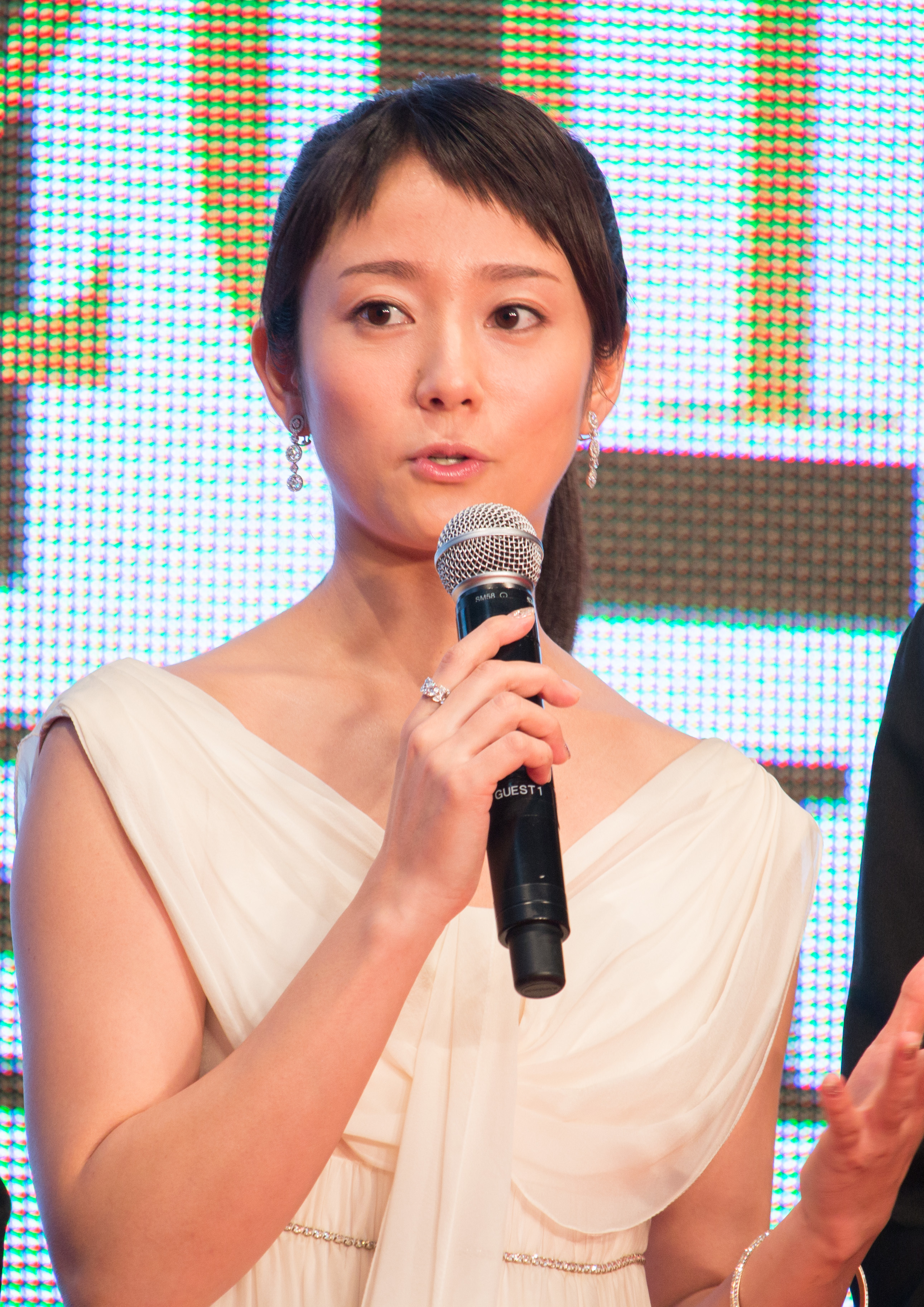
- Kimura at the 28th Tokyo International Film Festival in 2015
- Born: 19 October 1987 (age 39); Tokyo, Japan
- Occupation: Actress
- Years active: 2004–present
- Agent: Tristone Entertainment
- Known for: Zeni no Sensō; Mother Game: Kanojotachi no Kaikyū
- Children: 2
- Website: fuminokimuraofficial.com

Fumino Kimura (木村 文乃, Kimura Fumino; born October 19, 1987 in Tokyo) is a Japanese actress.

== Filmography ==
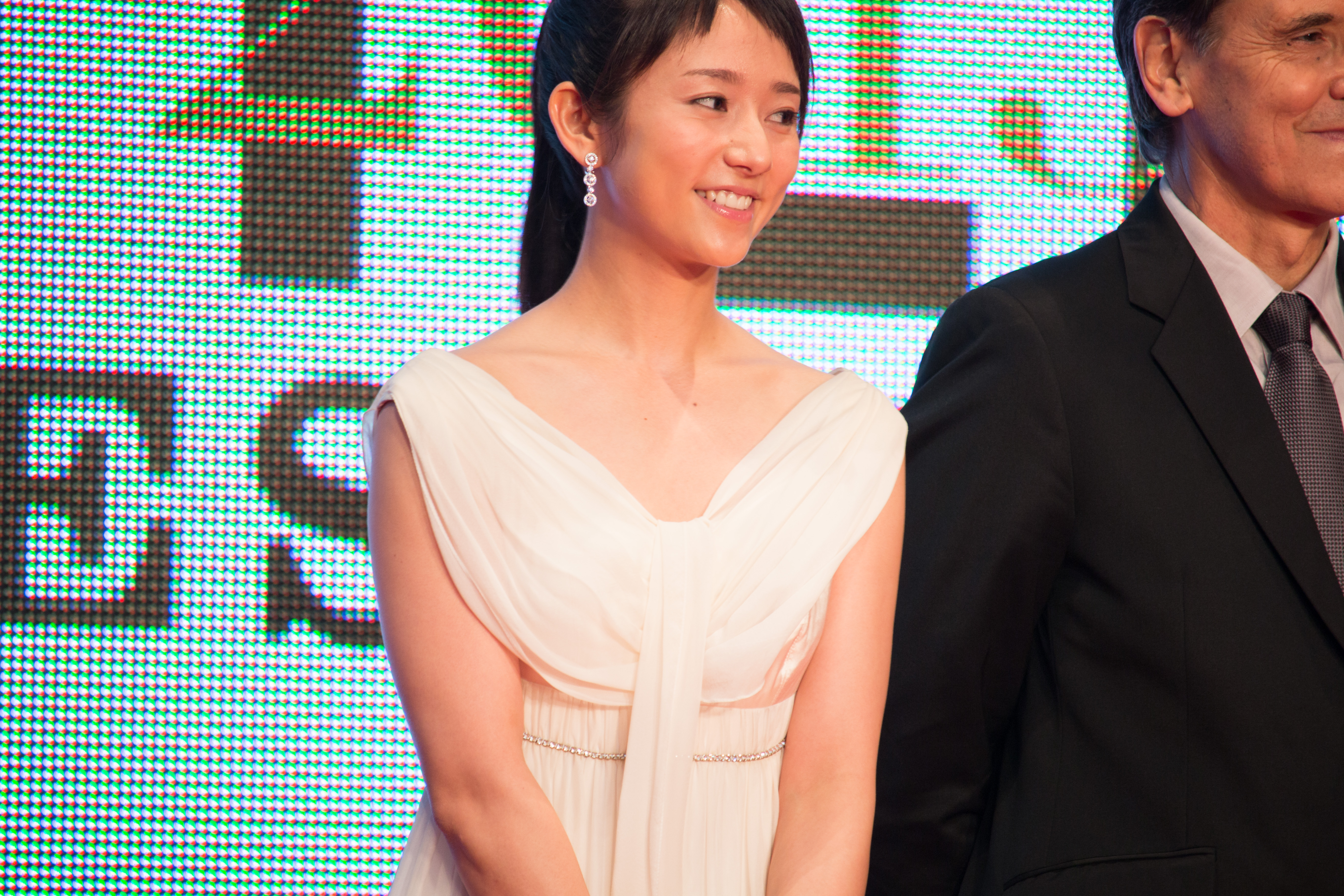
Kimura at the 28th Tokyo International Film Festival in 2015

=== Film ===
- Kaze no Dadu (2006), Ayumi Asano
- Adan (2006), Adan
- Paradise Kiss (2011)
- Run60 (2011), Maki
- Sukiyaki (2011), Shiori Mizushima
- Ramo Trip (2012), Mari Ijichi
- Chips (2012), Wakaba Ōnishi
- Love for Beginners (2012), Nana
- Bokutachi no Kōkan Nikki (2013), Maiko Utagawa
- I Hate Tokyo (2013)
- It All Began When I Met You (2013), Yukina Yamaguchi
- The Little House (2014), Yuki
- Nishino Yukihiko no Koi to Bōken (2014), Tama
- Taiyō no Suwaru Basho (2014), Kyōko Suzuhara
- Have a Song on Your Lips (2015), Haruko Matsuyama
- Initiation Love (2015), Miyako Ishimaru
- Piece of Cake (2015), Nanako
- The Cross (2016), Sayuri Nakagawa
- Reminiscence (2017), Mari Tadokoro
- Hibana: Spark (2017), Maki
- The Scythian Lamb (2018), Aya Ishida
- The Many Faces of Ito (2018), Rio Yazaki (E)
- My Retirement, My Life (2018), Yumiko Sano
- Modest Heroes (2018), Kanini (voice)
- The Fable (2019), Yōko
- Iwane: Sword of Serenity (2019)
- The Fable: The Killer Who Doesn't Kill (2021), Yōko
- Blue (2021), Chika Amano
- 99.9 Criminal Lawyer: The Movie (2021), Maiko Ozaki
- Love Life (2022), Taeko
- 7 Secretaries: The Movie (2022), Chiyo Mochizuki
- Rohan at the Louvre (2023), Nanase
- City Hunter (2024), Saeko Nogami
- Drawing Closer (2024), Mikiko
- Sham (2025)
- Climbing for Life (2025), Norie Tabe
- City Hunter 2 (2027), Saeko Nogami
- All That Exists (2027), Yumi Kihara

=== Television ===
- Dandan (NHK, 2008–2009), Suzuno
- Hanawake no Yonshimai (TBS, 2011)
- Honto ni Atta Kowai Hanashi Natsu no Tokubetsu-hen 2011 (Fuji TV, 2011), Harumi Kashiwada
- Mitsu no Aji: A Taste of Honey (Fuji TV, 2011), Rai Yōka
- Incident Akujotachi no Mesu (Fuji TV, 2011)
- Keishichō Shissōka Takashiro Kengo (TV Asahi, 2011), Michi Miura
- Run 60 (2012, MBS), Maki
- Ataru (TBS, 2012), Riko Suzuhara
- Doctor Ume (NHK, 2012), Shizuko Nojima
- Hōkago wa Mystery to Tomo ni (TBS, 2012), Eiko Noda
- Naniwa Shōnen Tanteidan (TBS, 2012), Mika Haruna
- Kuro no Onna Kyōshi (TBS, 2012), Haruka Aoyagi
- Dorokutā: Aruhi, Boku wa Mura de Tatta Hitori no Isha ni Natta (NHK BS, 2012)
- Osozaki no Himawari: Boku no Jinsei, Renewal (Fuji TV, 2012), Haruna Imai
- Sodom no Ringo: Lot o Koroshita Musumetachi (Wowow, 2013)
- Kumo no Kaidan (NTV, 2013), Akiko Tasaka
- Furueru Ushi (Wowow, 2013), Kozue Tagawa
- Kyō no Hi wa Sayōnara (NTV, 2013), Etsuko Tanabe
- Henshin Interviewer no Yūutsu (TBS, 2013), Rika Kahiyama
- Tokeiya no Musume (TBS, 2013), Chikako Kuniki
- Hasegawa Machiko Monogatari: Sazaesan ga Umareta Hi (Fuji TV, 2013), Yōko Hasegawa
- Ashita, Mama ga Inai (NTV, 2014), Kanai Mizusawa
- Kuroi Fukuin: Kokusaisen Stewardess Satsujin Jiken (TV Asahi, 2014), Setsuko Ikuta
- Yonimo Kimyōna Monogatari '14 Haru no Tokubetsu-hen (Fuji TV, 2014), Miyū Itsuki
- Time Taxi (KTV, 2014), Marina Kōzai
- Zeni no Sensō (KTV, 2015), Kozue Aoike
- Mother Game: Kanojotachi no Kaikyū (TBS, 2015), Kiko Kamahara
- Stone's Cocoon (Wowow, 2015), Tōko Kisaragi
- Moribito: Guardian of the Spirit (NHK, 2016), The Second Empress
- A Life: A Love (TBS, 2017), Yuki Shibata
- I'm Your Destiny (NTV, 2017), Haruko Kogetsu
- 99.9 Criminal Lawyer Season II (TBS, 2017), Maiko Ozaki
- The Many Faces of Ito (TBS, 2017), Rio Yazaki (E)
- Ōoku the Final (Fuji TV, 2019), Kume
- 7 Secretaries (TV Asahi, 2020), Chiyo Mochizuki
- Awaiting Kirin (NHK, 2020–21), Hiroko
- #bemyfamily (TBS, 2021), Momota Rei

=== Japanese dub ===
- Seasons (2016), narration

== Bibliography ==
=== Photobooks ===
- Fumino (Wani Books, November 9, 2013). ISBN 9784847045943.

== Awards and nominations ==
| Year | Award | Category | Work | Result | Ref. |
|---|---|---|---|---|---|
| 2014 | 38th Elan d'or Awards | Newcomers of the Year | Herself | Won | |
| 2015 | 18th Nikkan Sports Drama Grand Prix | Best Supporting Actress | War of Money | Won | |
| 2018 | 72nd Mainichi Film Awards | Best Supporting Actress | Spark | Nominated | |
| 2018 | 60th Blue Ribbon Awards | Best Supporting Actress | Spark, Reminiscence | Nominated | |
| 2018 | 27th Tokyo Sports Film Award | Best Supporting Actress | Reminiscence | Nominated | |
