= Dai Ikeda =

Japanese actor

- 池田 大
- Born: 6 March 1986 (age 39); Kanagawa Prefecture, Japan
- Occupations: Actor; model
- Years active: 2011–
- Agent: Hori Agency
- Height: 175 cm (5 ft 9 in)
- Spouse: Saori (Sekai no Owari) (m. 2017)
- Children: 1
- Website: Profile

Dai Ikeda (池田 大, Ikeda Dai; born 6 March 1986 in Kanagawa Prefecture) is a Japanese actor.

Ikeda is represented with Hori Agency. He performed in the stage play Crazy Honey (produced and directed by Yukiko Motoya) and made his debut in the entertainment industry in 2011. Ikeda made regular appearances in the 2013 Nichiyō Gekijō series Andō Lloyd: A.I. knows Love?

On 12 January 2017, it was announced that he married Sekai no Owari member Saori.

== Filmography ==
=== TV dramas ===
Year	Title	Role	Network	Notes	Ref.
2013	Andō Lloyd: A.I. knows Love?	Asaba Kurata	TBS		

=== Films ===
Year	Title	Role	Notes	Ref.
2023	My Beautiful Man: Eternal	Kōda		
