= Naoki Prize =

Japanese literary award

- 直木三十五賞 (Naoki Sanjūgo Shō)
- Awarded for: Best work of popular literature by rising author
- Country: Japan
- Presented by: Society for the Promotion of Japanese Literature
- First award: 1935; 91 years ago
- Website: www.bunshun.co.jp/shinkoukai/award/naoki/

The Naoki Prize, officially Naoki Sanjugo Prize (直木三十五賞, Naoki Sanjūgo Shō), is a Japanese literary award presented biannually. It was created in 1935 by Kikuchi Kan, then editor of the Bungeishunjū magazine, and named in memory of novelist Naoki Sanjugo. Sponsored by the Society for the Promotion of Japanese Literature, the award recognizes "the best work of popular literature in any format by a new, rising, or (reasonably young) established author." The winner receives a watch and one million yen.

Kikuchi founded the Naoki Prize with the Akutagawa Prize, which targets a new or rising author of literary fiction. The two prizes are viewed as "two sides of the same coin" and inseparable from one another. Because of the prestige associated with the Naoki Prize and the considerable attention the winner receives from the media, it, along with the Akutagawa Prize, is one of Japan's most sought after literary awards of recognition.

== Winners ==
Bungeishunjū maintains the official archive of past Naoki Prize winners.

=== 1st–100th ===
1935	1	Matsutarō Kawaguchi	Tsuruhachi Tsurujirō (鶴八鶴次郎), Fūryū Fukagawa Uta (風流深川唄; lit. Song of the Refined Fuka River), Meiji Ichidai Onna (明治一代女; lit. Meiji Era Woman)
1935	2	Uko Washio	Yoshinochō Taiheiki (吉野朝太平記; lit. Chronicles of the Yoshino Era of Peace), etc.
1936	3	Chōgorō Kaionji	Tenshō Onna Gassen (天正女合戦; lit. Tenshō Women's Battle), Budō Denraiki (武道傳來記, lit. Martial Arts Chronicles)
1936	4	Takatarō Kigi	Jinsei no Ahō (人生の阿呆; lit. A Fool's Life)
1937	5	No prize awarded	
1937	6	Masuji Ibuse	John Manjirō Hyōryūki (ジョン萬次郎漂流記; lit. The Drifting Chronicles of John Manjirō), etc.
1938	7	Sotoo Tachibana	Narin-denka e no Kaisō (ナリン殿下への回想; lit. Recollections of His Highness Narin)
1938	8	Tadao Ooike	Kabuto (兜首; lit. Helmet), Akitaguchi no Kyōdai (秋田口の兄弟; lit. The Akitaguchi Siblings)
1939	9	No prize awarded	
1939	10	No prize awarded	
1940	11	Chiyo Tsutsumi; Sensuke Kawachi	Koyubi (小指; lit. Pinky Finger), etc. Gunji Yuubin (軍事郵便; lit. Military Postal Service)
1940	12	Genzō Murakami	Kazusa Fudoki (上総風土記), etc.
1941	13	Sōjū Kimura	Unnan Shubihei (雲南守備兵; lit. Guards of the Southern Clouds)
1941	14	No prize awarded	
1942	15	No prize awarded	
1942	16	Norio Taoka; Takio Kanzaki	Gōjō Ichigo (強情いちご; lit. Stubborn Ichigo), etc. Kanyō (寛容; lit. Generosity), etc.
1943	17	No prize awarded	(Shūgorō Yamamoto's Nihon Fudōki (日本婦道記; lit. Chronicles of a Japanese Woman's Duties) was chosen, but he declined the prize.)
1943	18	Sōichi Mori	Yamahata (山畠), Ga to Sasabune (蛾と笹舟; lit. The Moth and the Toy Boat)
1944	19	Seizō Okada	Nyū Giniya Sangakusen (ニューギニヤ山岳戦; lit. New Guinea Mountain War)
1944	20	No prize awarded	
1949	21	Tsuneo Tomita	Omote (面; lit. Face), Irezumi (刺青; lit. Tattoo)
1949	22	Katsurō Yamada	Umi no Haien (海の廃園; lit. Abandoned Garden of the Sea)
1950	23	Hidemi Kon; Itoko Koyama	Tennō no Bōshi (天皇の帽子; lit. The Emperor's Hat); Shikkō Yūyo (執行猶予; lit. Stay of Execution)
1950	24	Kazuo Dan	Chōgonka (長恨歌; lit. Chōgon Song); Shinsetsu Ishikawa Goemon (真説石川五右衛門; lit. True Theory Ishikawa Goemon)
1951	25	Keita Genji	Eigoya-san (英語屋さん; lit. Mr. English Shop), Taifū-san (颱風さん; lit. Mr. Typhoon), Gokurōsan (御苦労さん; lit. I Appreciate Your Hard Work)
1951	26	Juran Hisao; Renzaburō Shibata	Suzuki Mondo (鈴木主水); Iesu no Ei (イエスの裔; lit. Descendant of Jesus)
1952	27	Shinji Fujiwara	Tsumina Onna (罪な女; lit. Sinful Woman), etc.
1952	28	Nobuyuki Tateno	Hanran (叛乱; lit. Insurrection)
1953	29	No prize awarded	
1953	30	No prize awarded	
1954	31	Yorichika Arima	Shūshin Miketsushū (終身未決囚; lit. Unconvicted Prisoner For Life)
1954	32	Haruo Umezaki; Yukio Togawa	Boroya no Shunjū (ボロ家の春秋; lit. Spring and Autumn of the Scrap Merchant); Takayasu Inu Monogatari (高安犬物語; lit. Takayasu Dog Story)
1955	33	No prize awarded	
1955	34	Jirō Nitta; Eikan Kyū	Gōrikiden (強力伝; lit. The Life of A Mountain Carrier); Honkon (香港; lit. Hong Kong)
1956	35	Norio Nanjō; Kanichi Kon	Tōdaiki (燈台鬼; lit. Lighthouse Demon); Kabe no Hana (壁の花; lit. Wallflower)
1956	36	Tōkō Kon; Miharu Hozumi	Ogin-sama (お吟さま); Kachigarasu (勝烏; lit. Victory Crows)
1957	37	Masanori Esaki	Ruson no Tanima (ルソンの谷間; lit. Valley of the Luzon)
1957	38	No prize awarded	
1958	39	Toyoko Yamasaki; Eiji Shinba	Hana Noren (花のれん; lit. Flower Shop Sign); Akai Yuki (赤い雪; lit. Red Snow)
1958	40	Saburō Shiroyama; Kyō Takigawa	Sōkaiya Kinjō (総会屋錦城; lit. Extortionist Kinjō); Ochiru (落ちる; lit. Fall Down)
1959	41	Kieko Watanabe; Yumie Hiraiwa	Mabechigawa (馬淵川); Taganeshi (鏨師; lit. Master Engraver)
1959	42	Ryōtarō Shiba; Yasuji Toita	Fukurō no Shiro (梟の城; Owls' Castle); Danjūrō Seppuku Jiken (團十郎切腹事件; lit. The Danjūrō Seppuku Incident)
1960	43	Shōtarō Ikenami	Sakuran (錯乱; lit. Confusion)
1960	44	Daikichi Terauchi; Jūgo Kuroiwa	Hagure Nenbutsu (はぐれ念仏; lit. Stray Prayer); Haitoku no Mesu (背徳のメス; lit. Invitation to Corruption)
1961	45	Tsutomu Minakami	The Temple of the Wild Geese (雁の寺, Gan no tera)
1961	46	Keiichi Itō	Hotaru no Kawa (螢の河; lit. River of Fireflies)
1962	47	Hisahide Sugimori	Tensai to Kyōjin no Aida (天才と狂人の間; lit. Between a Genius and a Madman)
1962	48	Hitomi Yamaguchi; Sonoko Sugimoto	Eburiman-shi no Yūgana Seikatsu (江分利満氏の優雅な生活; lit. The Elegant Lives of the Everyman Family); Koshū no Kishi (孤愁の岸; lit. Lonely Contemplation on the Shore)
1963	49	Tokuji Satō	Onna no Ikusa (女のいくさ; lit. The Women's War)
1963	50	Tsuruo Andō; Yoshie Wada	Kōdan Honmokutei (巷談本牧亭; lit. Talking about Honmokutei); Chiri no Naka (塵の中; lit. In the Dust)
1964	51	No prize awarded	
1964	52	Michiko Nagai; Atsuko Anzai	Enkan (炎環; lit. Ring of Fire); Chanshaoshu no Hanashi (張少子の話; lit. The Story of Zhang Shaozi)
1965	53	Shigeo Fujii	Niji (虹; lit. Rainbow)
1965	54	Yūkichi Shinbashi; Jihei Chiba	Yaochō (八百長; lit. Rigged Game); Toriko Shū-ki (虜愁記; lit. Sad Tale of a Prisoner)
1966	55	Masaaki Tachihara	Shiroi Keshi (白い罌粟; lit. White Poppy)
1966	56	Hiroyuki Itsuki	Aozameta Uma wo Miyo (蒼ざめた馬を見よ; lit. See the Pale Horse)
1967	57	Jirō Ikushima	Oitsumeru (追いつめる; lit. Cornered)
1967	58	Akiyuki Nosaka; Tooru Miyoshi	American Hijiki (アメリカひじき, Amerika Hijiki), Grave of the Fireflies (火垂るの墓, Hotaru no Haka); Hijiri Shōjo (聖少女; lit. Holy Girl)
1968	59	No prize awarded	
1968	60	Shunshin Chin; Mitsugu Saotome	Seigyoku Shishi Kōro (青玉獅子香炉; lit. The Blue Jade Shishi Incense Burner); Kyōjin no Ori (僑人の檻)
1969	61	Aiko Satō	Tatakai Sunde Hi ga Kurete (戦いすんで日が暮れて; lit. The Day of Battle's End Draws to a Close)
1969	62	No prize awarded	
1970	63	Junichi Watanabe; Yūki Shōji	Hikari to Kage (光と影; lit. Light and Shadow); Gunki Hatameku Shita ni (軍旗はためく下に; lit. Beneath the Fluttering Battle Flag)
1970	64	Jō Toyoda	Nagaragawa (長良川; lit. Nagara River)
1971	65	No prize awarded	
1971	66	No prize awarded	
1972	67	Hisashi Inoue; Kenjō Tsunabuchi	Tegusari Shinjū (手鎖心中; lit. Shackled Double Suicide); Zan (斬; lit. Beheading)
1972	68	No prize awarded	
1973	69	Shuhei Fujisawa; Hideo Osabe	Ansatsu no Nenrin (暗殺の年輪; lit. Annals of Assassination); Tsugaru Yosare Bushi (津軽世去れ節), Tsugaru Jonkara Bushi (津軽じょんから節)
1973	70	No prize awarded	
1974	71	Giichi Fujimoto	Oni no Uta (鬼の詩; lit. Song of Demons)
1974	72	Ryō Hanmura; Magoroku Ide	Ame Yadori (雨やどり; lit. Shelter From the Rain); Atorasu Densetsu (アトラス伝説; lit. The Legend of Atlas)
1975	73	No prize awarded	
1975	74	Ryuzo Saki	Fukushū suru wa Ware ni ari (復讐するは我にあり; lit. Vengeance is Mine)
1976	75	No prize awarded	
1976	76	Kyōzō Miyoshi	Kosodate Gokko (子育てごっこ; lit. Playing at Raising Children)
1977	77	No prize awarded	
1977	78	No prize awarded	
1978	79	Yō Tsumoto; Takehiro Irokawa	Jinjū no Umi (深重の海; lit. Jinjū's Sea); Rikon (離婚; lit. Divorce)
1978	80	Tomiko Miyao; Natsuo Ariake	Ichigen no Koto (一絃の琴; lit. One-Stringed Harp); Dai Naniwa Morobito Ourai (大浪花諸人往来; lit. The Comings and Goings of the Many People of Great Naniwa)
1979	81	Takashi Atōda; Komimasa Tanaka	Napoleon Crazy (ナポレオン狂, Naporeon Kyō); Rōkyoku-shi Asahimaru no Hanashi (浪曲師朝日丸の話; lit. The Tales of Master Storyteller Asahimaru), Mimi no Koto (ミミのこと; lit. Matters of the Ear)
1979	82	No prize awarded	
1980	83	Kuniko Mukōda; Kageki Shimoda	Hana no Namae (花の名前; lit. Name of the Flower), Kawauso (かわうそ; lit. Otter), Inugoya (犬小屋; lit. Dog House); Kiiroi Kiba (黄色い牙; lit. Yellow Fang)
1980	84	Masanori Nakamura	Genshu no Muhon (元首の謀叛; lit. Sovereign's Rebellion)
1981	85	Yukio Aoshima	Ningen Banji Saiō ga Hinoeuma (人間万事塞翁が丙午; lit. Everything Happens Unpredictably in the Year of the Horse)
1981	86	Kôhei Tsuka; Akira Mitsuoka	Kamata Kōshinkyoku (蒲田行進曲; lit. Kamata March); Kirai (機雷; lit. Sea Mine)
1982	87	Yūsuke Fukada; Tomomi Muramatsu	En'netsu Shōnin (炎熱商人; lit. Unbearable Heat Merchant); Jidai-ya no Nyōbō (時代屋の女房; lit. Wife of the Shop Era)
1982	88	No prize awarded	
1983	89	Kōshi Kurumizawa	Kuropan Furyo-ki (黒パン俘虜記; lit. Chronicle of the Brown Bread Prisoners)
1983	90	Takurō Kanki; Osamu Takahashi	Shiseikatsu (私生活; lit. Private Life); Hiden (秘伝; lit. Mystery)
1984	91	Mikihiko Renjō; Toshizō Nanba	Koibumi (恋文; lit. Love Letter); Tennojimura (てんのじ村; lit. Tennoji Village)
1984	92	No prize awarded	
1985	93	Yōko Yamaguchi	Enka no Mushi (演歌の虫; lit. Enka Insects), Rōbai (老梅; lit. Old Plum)
1985	94	Seigo Morita; Mariko Hayashi	Uogashi Monogatari (魚河岸ものがたり; lit. Fish Market Story); Saishuu-bin ni Maniaeba (最終便に間に合えば; lit. If I'm in Time for the Last Trip), Kyoto Made (京都まで; lit. Until Kyōto)
1986	95	Hiroko Minagawa	Koi Kurenai (恋紅; lit. Crimson Love)
1986	96	Gō Ōsaka; Shinpei Tokiwa	The Red Star of Cadiz (カディスの赤い星, Kadisu no Akai Hoshi); Tooi Amerika (遠いアメリカ; lit. Far Off America)
1987	97	Amy Yamada; Ichirō Shiraishi	Sōru Myūjikku Rabāzu Onrī (ソウル・ミュージック・ラバーズ・オンリー; lit. Soul Music Lovers Only); Kairōden (海狼伝; lit. Legend of the Sea Wolf)
1987	98	Makio Abe	Sorezore no Tsuigakushō (それぞれの終楽章; lit. The End of Each Musical Movement)
1988	99	Tamio Kageyama; Masaaki Nishiki	Tōi Umi kara Kita Coo (遠い海から来たCOO; lit. From a Distant Ocean Came Coo); Kooreru Hitomi (凍れる瞳; lit. An Eye Freezing Over), Hashima no Onna (端島の女; lit. The Hashima Woman)
1988	100	Akiko Sugimoto; Shizuko Tōdō	Tōkyō Shin Ōhashi Uchūzu (東京新大橋雨中図; lit. Tokyo New Big Bridge Path Plan); Urete Yuku Natsu (熟れてゆく夏; lit. Ripening Summer)

=== 101st to present ===
1989	101	Nejime Shōichi; Akira Sasakura	Kōenji Junjō Shōtengai (高円寺純情商店街; lit. Kōenji Purehearted Shopping District); Tooi Kuni kara no Satsujinsha (遠い国からの殺人者; lit. Murderer from a Distant Land)
1989	102	Seiji Hashikawa; Ryō Hara	Kodenshō (小伝抄; lit. Precise Biographical Sketch); Watashi ga Koroshita Shōjo (私が殺した少女; lit. The Girl I Killed)
1990	103	Tsumao Awasaka	Kage Kikyō (蔭桔梗; lit. Shadow Bellflower)
1990	104	Kaoru Furukawa	Hyōhakusha no Aria (漂泊者のアリア; lit. A Vagabond's Aria)
1991	105	Masamitsu Miyagitani; Sunao Ashihara	Kaki Shunjyū (夏姫春秋; lit. Summer Princess Spring and Autumn); Seishun Dendekedekedeke (青春デンデケデケデケ; lit. Youth Dendekedekedeke)
1991	106	Yoshio Takahashi; Katsuhiko Takahashi	Ōkami Bugyō (狼奉行; lit. Wolf Magistrate); Akai Kioku (緋い記憶; lit. Red Memory)
1992	107	Shizuka Ijūin	Uke Tsuki (受け月; lit. Receiving Month)
1992	108	Tatsurō Dekune	Tsukudashima Futari Shobō (佃島ふたり書房; lit. Tsukuda Island Two Bookstores)
1993	109	Kaoru Takamura; Aiko Kitahara	Mākusu no Yama (マークスの山; lit. Marks' Mountain); The Budding Tree (恋忘れ草, Koi Wasuregusa)
1993	110	Arimasa Osawa; Masayoshi Satō	Shinjuku Zame – Mugen Ningyō (新宿鮫 無間人形; lit. Shinjuku Sharks: Infinite Puppets); Ebisu-ya Kihei Tebikae (恵比寿屋喜兵衛手控え; lit. Ebisu Shop Kihei Memorandum)
1994	111	Akihiko Nakamura; Yasuhisa Ebisawa	Futatsu no Sanga (二つの山河; lit. Two Mountains and Rivers); Kikyō (帰郷; lit. Homecoming)
1994	112	No prize awarded	
1995	113	Shun Akasegawa	Hakkyū Zan'ei (白球残映)
1995	114	Mariko Koike; Iori Fujiwara	Koi (恋; lit. Love); Terorisuto no Parasoru (テロリストのパラソル; lit. The Terrorist's Parasol)
1996	115	Asa Nonami	The Hunter (凍える牙, Kogoeru Kiba)
1996	116	Masako Bandō	Yamahaha (山妣; lit. Mountain Mother)
1997	117	Setsuko Shinoda; Jirō Asada	Onnatachi no Jihaado (女たちのジハード; lit. The Women's Jihad); The Stationmaster (鉄道員, Poppoya)
1997	118	No prize awarded	
1998	119	Chōkitsu Kurumatani	The Paradise Bird Tattoo (赤目四十八瀧心中未遂, Akame Shijūya-taki Shinjū Misui)
1998	120	Miyuki Miyabe	Riyū (理由; lit. The Reason)
1999	121	Kenichi Satō; Natsuo Kirino	Ōhi no Rikon (王妃の離婚; lit. The Queen's Divorce); Yawaraka na Hoho (柔らかな頬; lit. Soft Cheeks)
1999	122	Rei Nakanishi	Nagasaki Burabura Bushi (長崎ぶらぶら節; lit. Ballad of a Nagasaki Stroll)
2000	123	Yoichi Funado; Kazuki Kaneshiro	May in the Valley of the Rainbow (虹の谷の五月, Niji no Tani no Gogatsu); Go
2000	124	Kiyoshi Shigematsu; Fumio Yamamoto	Bitamin F (ビタミンF; lit. Vitamin F); Puranaria (プラナリア; lit. Planaria)
2001	125	Yoshinaga Fujita	Ai no Ryōbun (愛の領分; lit. Territory of Love)
2001	126	Ichiriki Yamamoto; Kei Yuikawa	Akanezora (あかね空; lit. A Deep-Red Sky); Katagoshi no Koibito (肩ごしの恋人; lit. Over-the-Shoulder Lover)
2002	127	Yuzaburō Otokawa	Ikiru (生きる; lit. To Live)
2002	128	No prize awarded	
2003	129	Ira Ishida; Yuka Murayama	4-Teen (4TEEN フォーティーン); Hoshiboshi no Fune (星々の舟, lit. Ship of Stars)
2003	130	Kaori Ekuni; Natsuhiko Kyogoku	Gokyu suru Junbi wa Dekiteita (号泣する準備はできていた; lit. Preparations for Crying Have Been Made); Nochino Kōsetsu Hyaku Monogatari (後巷説百物語, lit. Further Gossip Hundred Tales)
2004	131	Hideo Okuda; Tatsuya Kumagai	Kūchū Buranko (空中ブランコ; lit. Trapeze); Kaikō no Mori (邂逅の森; lit. Forest of the Chance Meeting)
2004	132	Mitsuyo Kakuta	Taigan no Kanojo (対岸の彼女; lit. The Woman on the Opposite Shore)
2005	133	Minato Shukawa	Hana Manma (花まんま; lit. As a Flower)
2005	134	Keigo Higashino	The Devotion of Suspect X (容疑者Xの献身, Yōgisha X no Kenshin)
2006	135	Shion Miura; Eto Mori	Mahoro Ekimae Tada Benri-ken (まほろ駅前多田便利軒; lit. The Convenience Shop Just Before Mahoro Station); Kaze ni Maiagaru Binīru Shīto (風に舞いあがるビニールシート; lit. A Vinyl Sheet Dancing in the Wind)
2006	136	No prize awarded	
2007	137	Kesako Matsui	Yoshiwara Tebikigusa (吉原手引草; lit. Yoshiwara Handbook)
2007	138	Kazuki Sakuraba	Watashi no Otoko (私の男; lit. My Man)
2008	139	Areno Inoue	Kiriha e (切羽へ; lit. To the Face)
2008	140	Arata Tendo; Ken'ichi Yamamoto	Itamu Hito (悼む人; lit. Mourned Person); Rikyū ni Tazune yo (利休にたずねよ; lit. Go Ask Rikyū)
2009	141	Kaoru Kitamura	Sagi to Yuki (鷺と雪; lit. Herons and Snow)
2009	142	Jō Sasaki; Kazufumi Shiraishi	Haikyo ni Kō (廃墟に乞う; lit. An Invitation to the Ruins); Hokanaranu Hito e (ほかならぬ人へ; lit. To None Other Than)
2010	143	Kyōko Nakajima	Chiisai O'uchi (小さいおうち; lit. A Small House)
2010	144	Nobori Kiuchi; Shūsuke Michio	Hyōsa no Utau (漂砂のうたう; lit. The Singing of the Sands); Tsuki to Kani (月と蟹; lit. The Moon and Crabs)
2011	145	Jun Ikeido	Shitamachi Roketto (下町ロケット, lit. Shitamachi Rocket)
2011	146	Rin Hamuro	Higurashi no Ki (蜩ノ記; lit. Cicada Chronicles)
2012	147	Mizuki Tsujimura	Kagi no nai Yume wo Miru (鍵のない夢を見る; lit. I Saw a Dream Without a Key)
2012	148	Asai Ryo; Abe Ryutaro	Nanimono (何者; lit. Who Is This?); Tohaku (等伯)
2013	149	Shino Sakuragi	Hotel Royal (ホテルローヤル)
2013	150	Makate Asai; Kaoruko Himeno	Renka (恋歌; lit. Love Song); Shōwa no inu (昭和の犬; lit. Dog of Showa)
2014	151	Hiroyuki Kurokawa	Hamon (破門; lit. Expulsion)
2014	152	Kanako Nishi	Saraba! (サラバ!; lit. Farewell!)
2015	153	Akira Higashiyama	Ryu (流)
2015	154	Bunpei Aoyama	Tsuma wo Metorava (つまをめとらば; lit. If You Marry a Wife)
2016	155	Hiroshi Ogiwara	Umi no Mieru Rihatsuten (海の見える理髪店; lit. The Barber Shop with an Ocean View)
2016	156	Riku Onda	Honeybees and Distant Thunder (蜜蜂と遠雷; Mitsubachi to Enrai)
2017	157	Shogo Sato	Tsuki no Michikake (月の満ち欠け; lit. The Waxing and Waning of the Moon)
2017	158	Yoshinobu Kadoi	Gingatetsudo no Chichi (銀河鉄道の父; lit. Father of the Galaxy Railroad)
2018	159	Rio Shimamoto	Fāsuto Rabu (ファーストラヴ; lit. First Love)
2018	160	Junjō Shindō	Takarajima (宝島; lit. Hero's Island)
2019	161	Masumi Oshima	Uzu Imoseyama Onna Teikin Tamamusubi (渦 妹背山婦女庭訓魂結び, lit. Whirlpool, Husband and Wife Mountains: A Mirror of Virtuous Women, Requiem)
2019	162	Soichi Kawagoe	Netsu Gen (熱源, lit. Heat Source)
2020	163	Hase Seishū	The Boy and the Dog (少年と犬, Shonen to Inu)
2020	164	Naka Saijo	Kokoro(ura) sabishi kawa (心（うら）淋し川; lit. Lonely River)
2021	165	Toko Sawada; Kiwamu Sato	Hoshi ochite, nao (星落ちて、なお; lit. The Stars Have Fallen); Tezcatlipoca (テスカトリポカ)
2021	166	Shogo Imamura; Honobu Yonezawa	Saiō no Tate (塞王の楯; lit. Shield of the Fortress King); The Samurai and the Prisoner (黒牢城, Kokurōjō)
2022	167	Misumi Kubo	Yoru ni Hoshi wo Hanatsu (夜に星を放つ; lit. The Night of Shooting Stars)
2022	168	Satoshi Ogawa; Akane Chihaya	Chizu to Kobushi (地図と拳; lit. Map and Fist); Shirogane no Ha (しろがねの葉; lit. Silver Leaf)
2023	169	Ryōsuke Kakine; Sayako Nagai	Gokuraku Seii-taishōgun (極楽征夷大将軍; lit. General of the Paradise); Kobiki-chō no Adauchi (木挽町のあだ討ち; lit. Revenge in Kobikicho)
2023	170	Akiko Kawasaki; Manabu Makime	Tomogui (ともぐい); Hachigatsu no Gosho-ground (八月の御所グラウンド; lit. The Imperial Palace Grounds in August)
2024	171	Michi Ichiho	Tsumidemic (ツミデミック)
2024	172	Shin Iyohara	Ai o Tsugu Umi (藍を継ぐ海)
2025	173	No prize awarded	
2025	174	Teru Shimazu	Cafe no Kaerimichi (カフェーの帰り道)
2026	175	Kasumi Asakura	Kengwai (けんぐゎい)

== Winners and nominees available in English translation ==
=== Winners ===
- 1961 (45th) - Tsutomu Mizukami, The Temple of the Wild Geese (In The Temple of the Wild Geese and Bamboo Dolls of Echizen, trans. Dennis C. Washburn, Dalkey Archive Press, 2008)
- 1967 (57th) - Akiyuki Nosaka, American Hijiki (In The Penguin Book of Japanese Short Stories, trans. Jay Rubin, Penguin Books, 2017) / Grave of the Fireflies, trans. Ginny Tapley Takemori, Penguin Classics, 2025.
- 1973 (69th) - Hideo Osabe, Tsugaru Jonkarabushi and Tsugaru Yosarebushi (In Voices from the Snow, trans. James N. Westerhoven, Hirosaki University Press, 2009)
- 1979 (81st) - Takashi Atōda, "Napoleon Crazy", "The Visitor", and "The Transparent Fish" (In Napoleon Crazy and Other Stories, trans. Stanleigh H. Jones, Kodansha International, 1986) / "Of Golf and Its Beginnings" and "A Treatise on Count St. German" (In The Square Persimmon and Other Stories, trans. Millicent M. Horton, Tuttle Publishing, 1991)
- 1986 (96th) - Go Osaka, The Red Star of Cadiz (trans. Usha Jayaraman, Kurodahan Press, 2008)
- 1993 (109th) - Aiko Kitahara, The Budding Tree (trans. Ian MacDonald, Dalkey Archive Press, 2008)
- 1996 (115th) - Asa Nonami, The Hunter (trans. Juliet Winters Carpenter, Kodansha International, 2006)
- 1997 (117th) - Jirō Asada, The Stationmaster (trans. Terry Gallagher, Viz Media, 2009)
- 1998 (119th) - Chōkitsu Kurumatani, The Paradise Bird Tattoo (trans. Kenneth J. Bryson, Counterpoint, 2010)
- 2000 (123rd)
  - Yoichi Funado, May in the Valley of the Rainbow (trans. Eve Alison Nyren, Vertical, 2006)
  - Kazuki Kaneshiro, Go (trans. Takami Nieda, AmazonCrossing, 2018)
- 2005 (134th) - Keigo Higashino, The Devotion of Suspect X (trans. Alexander O. Smith, Minotaur Books, 2011)
- 2010 (143rd) - Kyoko Nakajima, The Little House (trans. Ginny Tapley Takemori, Darf Publishing, 2019)
- 2015 (153rd) - Akira Higashiyama, Ryu (trans. Alison Watts, 26letters, 2025)
- 2016 (156th) - Riku Onda, Honeybees and Distant Thunder (trans. Philip Gabriel, Pegasus Books, 2023)
- 2018 (159th) - Rio Shimamoto, First Love (trans. Louise Heal Kawai, Honford Star, 2024)
- 2020 (163rd) - Hase Seishū, The Boy and the Dog (trans. Alison Watts, Viking Press, 2022)
- 2021 (165th) - Kiwamu Sato, Tezcatlipoca (trans. Stephen Paul, Sphere, 2025)
- 2021 (166th) - Honobu Yonezawa, The Samurai and the Prisoner (trans. Giuseppe di Martino, Yen Press, 2023)

=== Nominees ===
- 1938 (7th) - Sakae Kubo, Land of Volcanic Ash (trans. David G. Goodman, Cornell University East Asia Program, 1986)
- 1963 (49th) - Toshiyuki Kajiyama, The Remembered Shadow of the Yi Dynasty (In The Clan Records: Five Stories of Korea, trans. Yoshiko Dykstra, University of Hawaii Press, 1995)
- 1963 (50th) - Masako Togawa, The Lady Killer (trans. Simon Grove, Pushkin Press, 2018)
- 1983 (89th) - Kenzo Kitakata, The Cage (trans. Paul Warham, Vertical, 2006)
- 1986 (95th) - Keiichiro Ryu, The Blade of the Courtesans (trans. James M. Vardaman, Vertical, 2008)
- 1988 (100th) - Joh Sasaki, Zero Over Berlin (trans. Hiroko Yoda, Vertical, 2004)
- 1991 (105th) - Miyuki Miyabe, The Sleeping Dragon (trans. Deborah Iwabuchi, Kodansha International, 2009)
- 1996 (115th) - Koji Suzuki, Dark Water (trans. Glynne Walley, Vertical, 2004)
- 1997 (118th) - Natsuo Kirino, Out (trans. Stephen Snyder, Vintage Books, 2005)
- 1998 (120th)
  - Keigo Higashino, Naoko (trans. Kerim Yasar, Vertical, 2004)
  - Hideo Yokoyama, Prefecture D (trans. Jonathan Lloyd-Davies, Riverrun, 2019)
- 1999 (122nd) - Keigo Higashino, Journey Under the Midnight Sun (trans. Alexander O. Smith, Little, Brown, 2015)
- 2001 (126th) - Ira Ishida, Call Boy (trans. Lamar Stone, Shueisha, 2013)
- 2004 (132nd) - Kōtarō Isaka, 3 Assassins (trans. Sam Malissa, Harvill Secker, 2022)
- 2005 (133rd)
  - Hideo Furukawa, Belka, Why Don't You Bark? (trans. Michael Emmerich, Viz Media, 2012)
  - Akiko Itoyama, In Pursuit of Lavender (trans. Charles de Wolf, Anthem Press, 2013)
- 2007 (137th)
  - Kazuki Sakuraba, Red Girls: The Legend of the Akakuchibas (trans. Jocelyne Allen, Viz Media, 2015)
  - Tomihiko Morimi, The Night is Short, Walk on Girl (trans. Emily Balistrieri, Yen Press, 2019)
- 2011 (145th) - Kazuaki Takano, Genocide of One (trans. Philip Gabriel, Mulholland Books, 2014)
- 2015 (153rd) - Asako Yuzuki, Hooked (trans. Polly Barton, Ecco Press, 2026)
- 2015 (154th) - Natsu Miyashita, The Forest of Wool and Steel (trans. Philip Gabriel, Doubleday, 2019)
- 2017 (157th) - Asako Yuzuki, Butter (trans. Polly Barton, Ecco Press, 2024)

== Current members of the selection committee ==
(As of 2024)

- Jirō Asada
- Kakuta Mitsuyo
- Natsuhiko Kyogoku
- Natsuo Kirino
- Kaoru Takamura (ja)
- Mariko Hayashi (ja)
- Shion Miura
- Miyuki Miyabe

== See also ==
- List of Japanese literary awards
