= Go (2001 film) =

2001 Japanese film by Isao Yukisada

- Film poster
- Directed by: Isao Yukisada
- Screenplay by: Kankurō Kudō
- Based on: Go by Kazuki Kaneshiro
- Produced by: Mitsuru Kurosawa
- Starring: Yōsuke Kubozuka; Kou Shibasaki; Shinobu Otake; Tarō Yamamoto
- Cinematography: Katsumi Yanagishima
- Edited by: Takeshi Imai
- Music by: Yōko Kumagai; Hidehiko Urayama
- Production companies: Toei Tokyo; TV Tokyo; Star Max; Toei Video Company; Tokyo FM Broadcasting Co.
- Distributed by: Toei Company
- Release dates: 20 October 2001 (Japan); 24 November 2001 (South Korea)
- Running time: 122 minutes
- Country: Japan
- Languages: Japanese; Korean

Go is a 2001 Japanese coming-of-age romantic drama film directed by Isao Yukisada, based on Kazuki Kaneshiro's novel of the same title, which tells the story of a Japanese-born North Korean teenager and a prejudiced Japanese girl whom he falls for.

It was Japan's official submission for Best Foreign Language Film at the 74th Academy Awards, but was not accepted as a nominee.

== Plot ==
Third-generation Korean, Sugihara, is a student at a Japanese high school after graduating from a North Korean junior high school in Japan. His father runs a back-alley shop that specializes in exchanging pachinko-earned goods for cash, which is stereotypically a "common" Zainichi occupation. His father had long supported North Korea, but he obtained South Korean nationality to go sightseeing in Hawaii, which required a South Korean passport.

Sugihara's school days are filled with fights that always result in his victory; he and his delinquent peers fill the rest of their time with all kinds of mischief. His best friend, Jong-Il, is a Korean high-school student who had been his classmate in junior high. When Sugihara decided to leave Korean schools for a Japanese high school, their classroom teacher called him a traitor to their homeland. However, Jong-Il supported Sugihara by saying: “We never have had what you call homeland.”

One day, Sugihara attends the birthday party of one of his friends and meets a mysterious Japanese girl whose family name is Sakurai (she is reluctant to use her first name). He takes her out on a couple of dates and they gradually become intimate. However, tragedy strikes when Jong-Il is stabbed to death by a Japanese youth at a railway station. Jong-Il mistakenly thought that the youth was about to attack a female Korean student at the station. The boy, who is carrying a knife, attacks and kills Jong-Il. Sakurai comforts Sugihara, and that night they attempt to have sex. She freezes in bed, however, when Sugihara confesses that he is Korean. She declares that she is afraid of a non-Japanese male entering her, and Sugihara leaves.

In the meantime, Sugihara's father has been depressed by the news that his younger brother died in North Korea. In an attempt to provoke him, Sugihara blames his father, stating that the second generation of Zainichi, with its sentimentality and powerlessness, has caused the Zainichi much grief and difficulty. They fistfight, and the result is Sugihara's complete defeat. In the wake of the fight, Sugihara realizes that the true reason for his father's adoption of South Korean nationality was because he wanted to make his son's life easier.

Six months later, on Christmas Eve, Sugihara is studying hard in preparation for the college entrance examinations. He is trying to fulfill the wishes of the deceased Jong-Il, who always wanted him to go to a (presumably Japanese) university. Sakurai calls him after a long period of silence between them and asks him to come to the school where they had their first date. In this last scene, they recover mutual affection and leave for some unknown place together in a light snowfall.

== Cast ==
- Yōsuke Kubozuka as Sugihara (杉原)
- Ko Shibasaki as Sakurai Tsubaki (桜井椿)
- Shinobu Ōtake as Michiko (道子; mother of Sugihara)
- Tsutomu Yamazaki as Hideyoshi (秀吉; father of Sugihara)
- Hirofumi Arai as Won-su (원수/ウォンス)
- Mitsu Murata as Katō (加藤)
- Takato Hosoyamada as Jeong-il (정일/チョンイル)
- Min Kim as Naomi (나오미/ナオミ)
- Gye-nam Myeong as Staff member of South Korean embassy
- Tarō Yamamoto as Tawake (タワケ)
- Ren Osugi as Taxi driver
- Sansei Shiomi as Mr. Kim (김 씨/キムさん)
- Masato Hagiwara as Policeman
- Anri Ban as Kaori (카오리/香織)
- Asami Mizukawa as Korean in the tube station

== Production ==
The film is based on a novel by Kazuki Kaneshiro, a Zainichi Korean himself, also entitled Go. It was published in 2000 by Kodansha, and received a Naoki Prize.

== Reception ==
=== Critical response ===
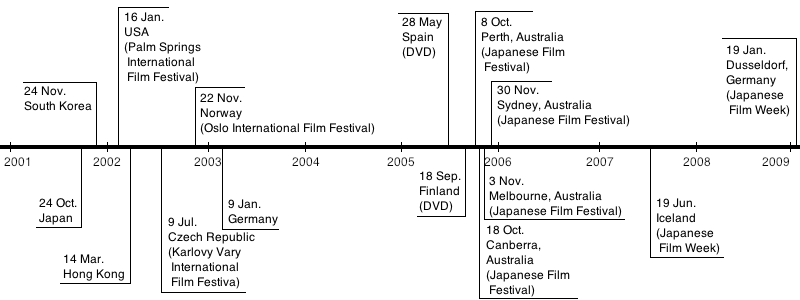
Release timeline

The film received a simultaneous theatrical release in Japan and South Korea, and was the first joint Japanese and South Korean production. It was also the first major film to challenge existing preconceptions about Japanese identity within the commercial format of a young adult romance film. The film explores not just the issue of prejudice, reflected in Sakurai's unconscious racism, but that of racial identity in general.

The film has received some criticism for its focus on racism that its protagonist experiences, in comparison to the deeply ingrained and institutionalized racism, ensuring that even after several generations of residence, many Koreans are still refused Japanese passports.

=== Awards ===
The film has received numerous awards.

- 2001 – Hochi Film Awards – Best Film
- 2001 – Nikkan Sports Film Awards – Best Director; Best New Talent
- 2002 – Japanese Academy Prize – Best Cinematography; Best Director; Best Editing; Best Lighting; Best Screenplay; Outstanding Performance by an Actor in a Leading Role; Newcomer of the Year
- 2002 – Blue Ribbon Awards – Best Director
- 2002 – Kinema Junpo – Best Director; Best Film; Best Screenplay
- 2002 – Mainichi Film Concours – Best Screenplay; Sponichi Grand Prize New Talent Award (Yōsuke Kubozuka and Kō Shibasaki)
- 2002 – International Film Festival of Marrakech – Best Actor; Golden Star (Isao Yukisada)
- 2002 – Palm Springs International Film Festival – FIPRESCI Prize (Isao Yukisada)
- 2002 – Yokohama Film Festival – Best Director; Best Film; Best Screenplay

== See also ==
- Cinema of Japan
- List of submissions to the 74th Academy Awards for Best Foreign Language Film
- List of Japanese submissions for the Academy Award for Best Foreign Language Film
