= Kitahara =

Kitahara (written: 北原) is a Japanese surname. Notable people with the surname include:

- Aiko Kitahara (born 1982), Japanese former pop singer and songwriter
- Aiko Kitahara (novelist) (1938–2013), Japanese novelist
- Fumi Kitahara (1968–2025), American animation publicist
- Hakushū Kitahara or Kitahara Ryūkichi (1885–1942), Japanese tanka poet
- Kana Kitahara (born 1988), Japanese footballer
- Koki Kitahara or Tatsumi Kitahara (born 1964), Japanese professional wrestler
- Maki Kitahara (born 2009), Japanese footballer
- Mie Kitahara (born 1933), Japanese actress
- Norihiko Kitahara (北原 憲彦, born 1954), Japanese basketball player
- Rie Kitahara (born 1991), Japanese singer and actress
- Satoko Kitahara (1929–1958), Japanese Catholic convert
- Sayaka Kitahara (born 1993), Japanese pop singer, voice actress, and actress
- Wataru Kitahara (born 1982), Japanese futsal player

== See also ==
- Kitahara Station
