= Washio =

Washio (鷲尾 characters for "eagle" and "tail") is a Japanese surname. People named Washio include:

- Eiichiro Washio (born 1977), Japanese politician
- Isako Washio (born 1967), Japanese actress
- Machiko Washio (born 1949), Japanese voice actress and actress
- Mie Washio, Japanese manga artist
- Uko Washio (1892–1951), Japanese novelist
