= Akane Chihaya =

Japanese writer (born 1979)

- 千早 茜
- Born: August 2, 1979 (age 47); Ebetsu, Hokkaido, Japan
- Education: Ritsumeikan University
- Occupation: Writer
- Writing career
- Language: Japanese
- Genre: Fiction
- Notable works: Iogami; Atokata; Otoko Tomodachi; Shirogane no Ha
- Notable awards: Shōsetsu Subaru New Writers Award; Izumi Kyōka Prize for Literature; Shimase Award for Love Stories; Naoki Prize

Akane Chihaya (千早 茜, Chihaya Akane; born August 2, 1979) is a Japanese writer. She has won the Shōsetsu Subaru New Writer Award, the Izumi Kyōka Prize for Literature, the Shimase Award for Love Stories, and the Naoki Prize.

== Early life and education ==
Chihaya was born in Hokkaido in 1979. From first grade through fifth grade Chihaya lived in Zambia, where her father, who was working for the Japan International Cooperation Agency, taught pathology at a university. Her family returned to Japan, and Chihaya started writing poetry and keeping a diary while in high school. Chihaya later graduated from Ritsumeikan University in Kyoto. After graduating from college she stayed in Kyoto and worked a variety of jobs at a cake shop, a medical office, and a museum.

== Career ==
Chihaya made her literary debut in 2008 with Iogami (魚神, Fish God), a novel that won the 21st Shōsetsu Subaru New Writer Award as well as the 37th Izumi Kyōka Prize for Literature, which is not usually awarded to a debut work. Her book Atokata (あとかた), a collection of short stories with common characters and the common theme of scarring, was published in 2013. Atokata won the Shimase Award for Love Stories and was nominated for the 150th Naoki Prize, but did not win. In July 2013 Chihaya married her husband. Her novel Otoko Tomodachi (男ともだち, Male Friends), about a woman in a sexless marriage who breaks off her affair with another man to reconnect with a male friend from her school days, was published in 2014. Otoko Tomodachi was nominated for the 151st Naoki Prize, but the prize went to Hiroyuki Kurokawa.

Chihaya produced several books after her Naoki Prize nominations, including the 2016 dark fantasy novel Yoru ni Naku Tori wa (夜に啼く鳥は), the 2017 novel Garden (ガーデン), about a male editor and his relationships with the women around him, and the 2018 novel Tadashii Onnatachi (正しい女たち, Correct Women). In 2023 Chihaya won the 168th Naoki Prize for Shirogane no Ha (しろがねの葉), sharing the prize with Satoshi Ogawa.

== Recognition ==
- 2008: 21st Shōsetsu Subaru New Writer Award
- 2009: 37th Izumi Kyōka Prize for Literature
- 2013: Shimase Award for Love Stories
- 2023: 168th Naoki Prize

== Works ==
- Iogami (魚神, Fish God), Shueisha, 2009, ISBN 9784087712766
- Atokata (あとかた), Shinchosha, 2013, ISBN 9784103341918
- Otoko Tomodachi (男ともだち, Male Friends), Bungeishunjū, 2014, ISBN 9784163900667
- Yoru ni Naku Tori wa (夜に啼く鳥は), Kadokawa, 2016, ISBN 9784041037294
- Garden (ガーデン), Bungeishunjū, 2017, ISBN 9784163906447
- Tadashii Onnatachi (正しい女たち, Correct Women), Bungeishunjū, 2018, ISBN 9784163908533
- Shirogane no Ha (しろがねの葉), Shinchosha, 2022, ISBN 9784103341949

== Adaptation ==
Her novel Otoko Tomodachi (男ともだち, Male Friends) was adapted in a film titled as Two Cigarettes, Three Nights directed by Yukiko Mishima. It premiered at 39th Tokyo International Film Festival on October 27, 2026.
