= Akiko Sugimoto =

Akiko Sugimoto (杉本 章子) (May 28, 1953 – December 4, 2015) was a Japanese novelist. She is best known for writing historical fiction about famous people who lived during the Edo period.

== Early life and education ==
Sugimoto was born on May 28, 1953, in the city of Yameshi in Fukuoka prefecture. When she was a year old her legs were paralyzed by polio. Her father worked at a university and knew a lot about Japanese literature and history. As a child, Sugimoto read avidly from her father's library, especially his collection of gesaku. She was also fascinated with kabuki. After graduating from high school she decided that she wanted to live independently from her parents, and moved to Okayama prefecture where she attended Notre Dame Seishin University. She later earned a master's degree from Kinjo Gakuin University in 1978. Her master's thesis was about Terakado Seiken.

== Career ==
Sugimoto revisited Terakado as a subject in her debut story, Otoko no kiseki (男の軌跡). Her first novel, Sharaku Maboroshi (写楽まぼろし) was published in 1983. It is about Tsutaya Jusaburo, the publisher for the painter Sharaku. Her 1988 novel Tokyo Shin-Ohashi Uchuzu (東京新大橋雨中図) won the 100th Naoki Prize alongside Shizuko Tōdō. In 1990 she wrote Bakudan Karaku (爆弾可楽), which was about one of the rakugoka who used the artist name Sanshōtei Karaku. While she mostly wrote about the Edo period, she sometimes also wrote about the Meiji period, such as in her 1995 Zan'ei (残映), which was published in the Asahi Shinbun over the course of a year.

In 2002 her novel Osuzu Shintaro Ninjo Shimatsu Cho (おすず―信太郎人情始末帖) won the Gishū Nakayama award. The book became a series, which ended in 2008. It was her first series and the only one she completed.

Sugimoto died of breast cancer on December 4, 2015.
