= Tamio =

- Gender: Male

Origin
- Origin: Japanese
- Meaning: Different meanings depending on the kanji used

Tamio (written: 民生 or 民夫) is a masculine Japanese given name. Notable people with the name include:

- Tamio Kageyama (景山 民夫; 1947–1998), Japanese writer
- Tamio Kawachi (川地 民夫; 1938–2018), Japanese actor
- Tamio Ōki (大木 民夫; born 1928–2017), Japanese voice actor
- Tamio Okuda (奥田 民生; born 1965), Japanese singer-songwriter
