= SP (TV series) =

- Title of SP
- Genre: Action
- Created by: Kazuki Kaneshiro
- Starring: Junichi Okada; Shinichi Tsutsumi; Yōko Maki
- Ending theme: way of life (V6)
- Composer: Yugo Kanno
- Country of origin: Japan
- Original language: Japanese
- No. of episodes: 11+Special

Production
- Producer: Ichiro Takai
- Production location: Tokyo
- Running time: 42 min./episode

Original release
- Network: Fuji TV
- Release: November 3, 2007 – January 26, 2008

SP, also known as Security Police (SP 警視庁警備部警護課第四係, SP Keishicho Keibibu Keigoka Daiyon-gakari; SP Metropolitan Police Department Security Police Division, 4th District), is a Japanese television drama based on the real life security police unit of Japan which is responsible for domestic and foreign abuse. The series script was written by famed GO author Kazuki Kaneshiro and marks his first time writing for a television drama. The drama centers on a newly recruited SP officer named Kaoru Inoue, who is the only SP officer known in the force to have sharp senses that enables him to conduct his duties by using this ESP sense to take down the threat before it appears to threaten the VIP and the civilians who are caught in the middle.

The franchise consists of the TV series, two film adaptations of the series released in 2010 and 2011 with a manga adaptation.

== Plot ==
Kaoru Inoue had suffered a tragedy when his parents were killed by a knife-wielding man in the political rally of Assemblyman Yūzō Asada in Tokyo when he was 6. Because of this, all of his senses have been improved with the ability to detect anything in his surroundings ranging from telling who is an assassin and who is a civilian while being able to tell important details such as having photographic and tracking abilities. Veteran SP officer Sōichirō Ogata recruits him from SP training after being impressed with his training under Section 4 of the SP division. Inoue works with Eri Sasamoto, one of the few women serving in the division. Another officer is Takafumi Yamamoto, who is the only known SP officer to have MMA experience with a preference to use the 7:3 hairstyle ratio. Mitsuo Ishida is the only known SP officer in the section who had been previously married. Together, these men and women work in unison to protect the VIPs assigned to them from being killed by assassins. But when the team is assigned to protect Asada, now the Prime Minister of Japan, Inoue begins to have nightmares relating to the tragedy while Ogata strives to ensure his safety while having some secrets of his own aside from Inoue.

== Cast ==
- Junichi Okada as Kaoru Inoue (井上薫, Inoue Kaoru)
- Shinichi Tsutsumi as Sōichirō Ogata (尾形総一郎, Ogata Sōichirō)
- Yōko Maki as Eri Sasamoto (笹本絵里, Sasamoto Eri)
- Satoru Matsuo as Takafumi Yamamoto (山本隆文, Yamamoto Takafumi)
- Yū Kamio as Mitsuo Ishida (石田光男, Ishida Mitsuo)
- Atsuko Hirata as Harakawa (原川)
- Shingo Egami as Yoshiharu Nakao (中尾義春, Nakao Yoshiharu)
- Kisuke Iida as Yūji Nishijima (西島勇司, Nishijima Yūji)
- Toru Nomaguchi as Ichirō Tanaka (田中一郎, Tanaka Ichirō)
- Kei Yamamoto as Yūzō Asada (麻田雄三, Asada Yūzō)
- Sandaime Uotake Hamada Shigeo as Hiroo (ヒロオ)
- Mitsuru Hirata as Kazuya Yamanishi (山西一弥, Yamanishi Kazuya)

== Reception ==
The show's final episode reached a viewership rating of 18.9%, the highest in recent history for a late-night drama. Since there were high ratings, an average of 15.0%, a special was aired on April 5, 2008. The average rating is the third highest in the fall season (October 2007 - January 2008), following Galileo with the 21.9% rating and Team Medical Dragon 2 with the 16.7% rating.

== Other media ==
=== Movies ===
Two movies have been made using the same cast and crew as the TV-series. The first film, SP: Yabou-hen (international title SP: The Motion Picture), was released on October 30, 2010 and made ¥3.63 billion, making it one of the highest-grossing films of 2010 in Japan. It also grossed $26,167 in Hong Kong, for a total of $39.65 million in East Asia.

The second movie SP: Kakumei Hen (international title SP: The Motion Picture II) was released on March 12, 2011. Two TV Specials were shown on March 4 and 5, 2011 serving as a prologue to the second movie. The main cast reprised their roles, while scriptwriter Kazuki Kaneshiro and director Katsuyuki Motohiro also returned. The film grossed ¥3.33 billion ($41.73 million) in Japan, and $12,783 in Hong Kong.
