= TeaTime Book Club =

Celebrity book club

TeaTime Book Club is a celebrity book club founded in March 2024 by American actress Dakota Johnson. The club operates primarily through Instagram and is affiliated with Johnson's production company, TeaTime Pictures, which she co-founded with former Netflix development executive Ro Donnelly.

== History ==
TeaTime Book Club launched on March 1, 2024. The club emerged from Johnson's work at TeaTime Pictures, where she searches for intellectual property to adapt for film and television. The first selection was Beautyland by Marie-Helene Bertino.

== Format ==
The book club operates through an Instagram broadcast channel. Members receive monthly book selections along with supplementary content, including author interviews, curated playlists, and contextual materials. The club maintains a Bookshop.org storefront for purchasing selected titles.

In an interview with Bustle, Johnson stated: "I want to fall down the rabbit hole every time I read… to invest in the book, invest in the language, invest in the references."

== Book selections ==
TeaTime Book Club focuses primarily on contemporary fiction, with an emphasis on debut novels. Below are the books that have been selected as of June 2026:

=== 2024 ===
Month	Title	Author
March	Beautyland	Marie-Helene Bertino
April	The Hearing Test	Eliza Barry Callahan
May	Cinema Love	Jiaming Tang
June	We Were the Universe	Kimberly King Parsons
July	Pink Slime	Fernanda Trías
August	The Anthropologists	Ayşegül Savaş
September	The Hypocrite	Jo Hamya
October	Model Home	Rivers Solomon
November	Don't be a Stranger	Susan Minot
December	Rental House	Weike Wang

=== 2025 ===
Month	Title	Author
January	Letters to a Young Poet	Rainer Maria Rilke
February	The Lamb	Lucy Rose
March	Loca	Alejandro Heredia
April	The Antidote	Karen Russell
May	Audition	Katie Kitamura
June	Flashlight	Susan Choi
July	The Hitchhiker's Guide to the Galaxy	Douglas Adams
August	Make Your Way Home	Carrie R. Moore
September	The Dilemmas of Working Women	Fumio Yamamoto
October	The Wilderness	Angela Flournoy
November	The Ten Year Affair	Erin Somers
December	Thirst Trap	Gráinne O'Hare

=== 2026 ===
Month	Title	Author
January	The Bell Jar	Sylvia Plath
February	Discipline	Larissa Pham
March	Diorama	Carol Bensimon
April	Under Water	Tara Menon
May	My Dear You	Rachel Khong
June	Mare	Emily Haworth-Booth
July	The Waves	Virginia Woolf
August	Beginning Middle End	Valeria Luiselli
September	Hello, Limerence	Momo Yamaguchi
October	Verity	Colleen Hoover

== Connection to TeaTime Pictures ==
The book club is connected to TeaTime Pictures, the production company Johnson founded with Ro Donnelly in 2019. The company has produced the Sundance Film Festival Audience Award-winning film Cha Cha Real Smooth (2022) and the Roku comedy series Slip (2023). In July 2025, TeaTime Pictures signed a first-look deal with Sony Pictures Television.

== Reception ==
The book club is part of a trend of celebrity book clubs, launched in the 2020s, alongside ventures by Reese Witherspoon, Emma Roberts, Dua Lipa, and Kaia Gerber. Johnson has described her approach as emphasizing engagement with literary texts.

== See also ==
- TeaTime Pictures
- Dakota Johnson
- Book discussion club
