= Koshi Kurumizawa =

Japanese writer (1925–1994)

- Kurumizawa Kōshi
- Born: 26 April 1925; Sumida, Tokyo, Japan
- Died: 23 May 1994 (aged 69); Tokyo, Japan
- Occupation: Writer
- Writing career
- Genre: Novels

Masatarō Shimizu (清水 正二郎, Shimizu Masatarō; 26 April 1925 – 23 May 1994), known by his pen name Koshi Kurumizawa (胡桃沢 耕史, Kurumizawa Kōshi), was a Japanese writer of detective fiction during the Shōwa era.

== Biography ==
Born in the Mukojima neighborhood of Sumida, Tokyo, Kurumizawa began writing fiction when he was still in high school. Although he was accepted to Takushoku University, where he studied the Chinese language, in 1942 he left without graduating and illegally migrated to Manchukuo to escape the wartime food shortages in Japan. He was conscripted into the military intelligence section of the Imperial Japanese Army’s Eighth Combined Division in 1945, and after the Soviet invasion of Manchuria was captured and sent to Siberia as a prisoner of war by the Soviet Red Army. He was returned to Japan in 1947 and graduated from college. In 1949, he completed writing an account of his experiences in the Siberian internment camps, and worked at a number of part-time jobs, including a stint as a scenario writer for Toei Studios. In 1953, he obtained at the Japanese government broadcasting company, NHK, as a producer of radio programs, and continued to write on the side. His first novel Soshi futatabi kaerazu ("The Desperado Does Not Return"), published under his actual name, was awarded a prize in 1955 for best work by a new author. He set aside all of the earnings from his writing, and used to fund a round-the-world trip from 1958 to 1967, mostly on a 50-cc Honda Super Cub. On his return to Japan, he adopted the Kurumizawa Kōshi pen-name, and began to write adventure novels.

In 1981 and in 1982, he was recommended for the Naoki Prize for novels based on his travels. In 1983, his novel, Tenzan o koete (“Crossing the Tenzan Mountains”), set in Dairen and Manchukuo won the Mystery Writers of Japan Award. In 1983, he was awarded the prestigious Naoki Prize for his story Kuro Pan Furyoki (“Chronicle of the Brown Bread Prisoners”) about the suffering of a Japanese prisoner of war in Siberia after World War II.

In the 1980s, his series of detective stories beginning with Tonderu Keiji, whose protagonist was a professor of law at Tokyo University became a massive best seller with some ten million volumes published. The story was also made into a television drama on the TBS network in 1986 and 1987 starring Hiromi Go. During the drama, Kurumisawa made cameo appearances.

A fervent fan of author Naoki Sanjugo, Kurimizawa made sure that he secured the plot next to Naoki's grave in the temple of Chōman-ji in Kanazawa-ku, Yokohama, and erected his own gravestone there prior to his death in 1994.

== See also ==
- Japanese literature
- List of Japanese authors
