= Itoko Koyama =

Itoko Koyama (小山 いと子) (born Ito Ikemoto; July 13, 1901 – July 25, 1989) was a Japanese writer. She is best known for her 1956 biography of Empress Kōjun. She was a recipient of both the Fujin Kōron Prize and the Naoki Prize.

== Early life and education ==
Koyama was born Ito Ikemoto in Kochi prefecture on July 13, 1901. Her father worked in the Ministry of Agriculture and Trade. While studying at Kyushu Girl's Middle School, she also studied under the poet Tōsei Hashida. After graduation she married Kyūichi Koyama, who worked at a textile mill. They had four children.

== Career ==
Koyama's writing career began when she published a short story titled "Matsukichi" in Hi no Tori magazine. However, her work began to draw attention when she won the Fujin Kōron Prize for "Kaimon Kyō" in 1933. She wrote several other stories in the 1930s, one of which was shortlisted for the Akutagawa Prize.

In 1941 she divorced her husband and went overseas to join the Pen butai ("Pen Corps"). She was a war correspondent in Java and Sumatra for the duration of World War II. When she returned to Japan remarried her ex-husband and continued writing fiction and autobiographical work. Her 1950 story "Shikkō Yūyo" won the Naoki Prize. She and Kyūichi divorced a second time in 1954.

However, Koyama's most famous work is her 1956 biography of Empress Kōjun titled "Kōgō sama". It was later translated and published in English as "Nagako: Empress of Japan". In it she humanizes the empress and describes everyday life at the Imperial Palace.

She wrote for the Yomiuri Shinbun from 1957 onward. She died of heart failure on July 25, 1989.

== Style ==
Koyama's time as a journalist shows in her careful research and clear writing style, earning her praise as a social critic. However, many of her post-war stories that were published in women's magazines were criticized as being formulaic and sentimental.

== Bibliography ==
- Nagako: Empress of Japan. 1956.
