= Hideo Osabe =

Japanese essayist and novelist

- Born: September 3, 1934
- Died: October 18, 2018 (aged 84)
- Occupation: Novelist
- Writing career
- Language: Japanese

Hideo Osabe (長部日出雄, Osabe Hideo; 3 September 1934 – 18 October 2018) was a Japanese essayist and novelist. His work focused on movies and Osamu Dazai.

He was born in Aomori Prefecture, where Dazai was also born. He also once directed a movie.

He won the Naoki Prize in 1973 for Tsugaru jongara bushi and Tsugaru yosare bushi.

He was awarded a Medal of Honor (with Purple Ribbon, for contributions to education and culture) from the Japanese government in 2002.

== Bibliography ==
=== Fiction ===
- Tsugaru jongara bushi
- Tsugaru yosare bushi
- Tenno no Tanjo, Eigateki Kojiki

=== Essays ===
- Cherry and Christ, another history of Osamu Dazai

== Filmography ==
- Festival of Dream (夢の祭り Yume no Matsuri) (director and writer)

a movie about a shamisen player

== See also ==
- Closet screenplay
