= Night's Tightrope =

- Theatrical release poster
- Directed by: Yukiko Mishima
- Written by: Kana Matsui; Yukiko Mishima
- Based on: Shōjo by Kanae Minato
- Produced by: Kiyokazu Ishizuka; Hiroaki Saito; Yuki Seike
- Starring: Tsubasa Honda; Mizuki Yamamoto; Mackenyu; Ryō Satō; Kazuya Kojima; Goro Inagaki
- Cinematography: Yuta Tsukinaga
- Edited by: Hitomi Kato
- Music by: Masahiro Hiramoto
- Production companies: Kinoshita Group; Pony Canyon; Parco; FINE Entertainment; Nippon BS Broadcasting; Futabasha; Universal Music Japan; Nippan Group Holdings; Armax Japan
- Distributed by: Toei
- Release date: 8 October 2016 (Japan)
- Running time: 120 minutes
- Country: Japan
- Language: Japanese

Night's Tightrope, known in Japan as Shōjo (Japanese: 少女), is a Japanese film directed by Yukiko Mishima, based on author Kanae Minato's novel of the same name. The theme song "Yami ni me o Koraseba" (闇に目を凝らせば) was written and performed specifically for the film by the rock band Glim Spanky at the request of Mishima.

== Plot ==
Yuki (Tsubasa Honda) is a second year high school student. She volunteers at a pediatrics ward for her summer vacation, because she wants to witness the moment a person dies. She got that thought after feeling envious of a transfer student's story of seeing a friend's dead body.

Yuki has friend named Atsuko (Mizuki Yamamoto). She was bullied in the past and has anxiety issues. She volunteers at a nursing home for her summer vacation, hoping that she will gain courage if she sees the moment a person dies.

== Cast ==
- Tsubasa Honda as Yuki Sakurai
- Mizuki Yamamoto as Atsuko Kusano
- Mackenyu as Hikaru Makise
- Ryō Satō as Shiori Takizawa
- Kazuya Kojima as Kazuki Ogura
- Daikichi Sugawara
- Shizuka Ishibashi as Classmate
- Maiko Kawakami
- Guin-Poon-Chaw
- Kazuko Shirakawa
- Goro Inagaki as Takao Takao
