= Mitsugu Saotome =

Japanese author (1926–2008)

Kanegae Hideyoshi
- Born: January 1, 1926; Harbin, Manchuria, China
- Died: December 23, 2008 (aged 82); Kamakura, Kanagawa, Japan
- Occupation: Novelist
- Writing career
- Pen name: Mitsugu Saotome
- Notable work: Kyojin no Ori (1968)
- Notable awards: Naoki Prize

Mitsugu Saotome (早乙女貢, Saotome Mitsugu; January 1, 1926 – December 23, 2008) was the pen-name of Kanegae Hideyoshi, a Japanese writer of historical fiction in Shōwa and Heisei period Japan. He won the Yoshikawa Eiji Prize for Literature and the Naoki Prize.

== Biography ==
Saotome's grandfather was a samurai of Aizu Domain, and following the defeat of the domain in the Boshin War, immigrated to the United States. However, he later returned to Yokohama and from there to Shanghai. Saotomo was born in Harbin, Manchuria in Northeast China, and thus was raised in Manchukuo; however, following the defeat of Japan in World War II, he was evacuated to Kyushu in 1946. He moved to Tokyo in 1948, and attended Keio University's Literature Department, but left school before graduating. In 1954, the noted author, Yamamoto Shugoro, agreed to become his tutor.

In 1956, together with other like-minded authors, he formed a literary criticism group called Shosetsu Kaigi ("Fiction Conference"), with members supporting each other by reviewing each other's work. One of the products of this collaboration was his novel Kyojin no Ori, about the María Luz Incident, which was awarded the 60th Naoki Prize (1968下).

Saotome claimed that his ancestry from led to his interest in historical matters, and the bulk of his work has been historical fiction set in the Sengoku, Edo or Bakumatsu periods. He was awarded the 23rd Yoshikawa Eiji Prize for Literature (1989) for Aizu Shikon ("The Soul of Aizu Samurai"). Many of his works have been adapted into movies or television series.

In 2006, he was elected the chairman of the Japanese P.E.N. After contracting stomach cancer, Saotome died at a hospital in Kamakura, Kanagawa, Japan.
