= Fujimoto Kazuko =

Japanese essayist and translator (born 1939)

- Born: 1 January 1939; Japan Tokyo
- Resting place: United States
- Other name: 藤本 和子
- Occupation: essayist
- Relatives: David G. Goodman

Fujimoto Kazuko (藤本 和子; born 1939) is a Japanese essayist and translator.

== Biography ==
She was born in Tokyo.

== Bibliography ==
- オリエントの舌

== See also ==
- Japanese literature
- List of Japanese authors
