= Shimase Love Literature Prize =

Japanese literary award for romantic fiction

Shimase Love Literature Prize (島清恋愛文学賞 (Shimase ren’ai bungaku-shō)) is a Japanese literary award presented annually for outstanding works of romantic fiction. Established in 1994 by the former town of Mikawa (now part of Hakusan, Ishikawa), the prize honors the writer Shimada Seijirō. Since 2014, the award has been organized and administered by Kanazawa Gakuin University.

== Background ==
The prize was founded by the town of Mikawa to commemorate the 40th anniversary of a municipal merger. Following the dissolution of Mikawa in 2005, responsibility for the award was transferred to the city of Hakusan.

Due to organizational difficulties, the prize was temporarily suspended in 2011. It was revived in 2013 by a private organization, the Japan Society for the Promotion of Love Literature. Since 2014, it has been continued under the auspices of Kanazawa Gakuin University.

== Selection process ==
A distinctive feature of the Shimase Love Literature Prize is the active involvement of students from Kanazawa Gakuin University in the selection process.

As part of the “Shimase Love Literature Seminar,” students read and discuss submitted works and nominate candidates for the final round. The final decision is made by a jury composed of established writers and literary scholars.

== Laureates ==
| Year | Laureate(s) | Original title | English title |
|---|---|---|---|
| 1994 | Takagi Nobuko | 蔵燃 | Burning Ivy |
| 1995 | Yamamoto Michiko | 瑞瓦唐草 | Chinese Forget-Me-Not |
| 1996 | Bandō Masako | 桜雨 | Cherry Blossom Rain |
| 1997 | Nozawa Hisashi | 恋愛時代 | The Age of Love |
| 1998 | Koike Mariko | 欲望 | Desire |
| 1999 | Fujita Yoshinaga | 求愛 | Courtship |
| 2000 | Yū Aku | 詩小説 | Lyrical Novel |
| 2001 | Tōdō Shizuko | ソング・オブ・サンデー | Song of Sunday |
| 2002 | Iwai Shimako | 自由戀愛 | Free Love |
| 2003 | Tanimura Shiho | 海猫 | Sea Cat |
| 2004 | Inoue Areno | 潤一 | Jun'ichi |
| 2005 | Kodemari Rui | 欲しいのは、あなただけ | All I Want Is You |
| 2006 | Ira Ishida | 眠れぬ真珠 | The Sleepless Pearl |
| 2007 | Ekuni Kaori | がらくた | Junk |
| 2008 | Sawako Agawa | 婚約のあとで | After the Engagement |
| 2009 | Yuka Murayama | ダブル・ファンタジー | Double Fantasy |
| 2010 | Kirino Natsuo | ナニカアル | Something Is There |
| 2011 | Atsuko Asano | たまゆら | Tamayura |
| 2012 | Shino Sakuragi | ラブレス | Loveless |
| 2013 | Mariko Hayashi / Akane Chihaya | アスクレピオスの愛人 / あとかた | Asclepius’ Lover / Traces |
| 2014 | Rio Shimamoto | Red | Red |
| 2015 | Manichi Yoshimura | 臣女 | The Handmaiden |
| 2016 | Otokawa Yūzaburō / Nao-Cola Yamazaki | ロゴスの市 / 美しい距離 | The City of Logos / Beautiful Distance |
| 2017 | Hirokage Asakura | 風が吹いたり、花が散ったり | The Wind Blows, Flowers Fall |
| 2018 | Miura Shion | ののはな通信 | Nonohana Letters |
| 2019 | Wataya Risa | 生のみ生のままで | Simply Alive |
| 2020 | Yamamoto Fumio | 自転しながら公転する | Orbiting While Rotating |
| 2021 | Toriko Yoshikawa | 余命一年、男をかう | One Year Left: Buying a Man |
| 2022 | Yoshida Shūichi | ミス・サンシャイン | Miss Sunshine |
| 2023 | Michi Ichihō / Ueda Takahiro | 光のとこにいてね / 最愛の | Stay in the Light / Beloved |
| 2024 | Hikorohii | 黙って喋って | Speaking in Silence |
Source: World of Literary Prizes

English titles are approximate translations for reference.
