= Masumi Oshima =

Japanese writer

- 大島 真寿美
- Born: 1962 (age 63–64)
- Occupation: Writer
- Writing career
- Language: Japanese
- Genre: Fiction
- Notable works: Chocolietta; Nijiiro Tenki Ame; Bitter Sugar; Uzu: Imoseyama Onna Teikin, Tamamusubi
- Notable awards: Naoki Prize

Masumi Oshima (大島 真寿美, Ōshima Masumi) is a Japanese writer. She has won the Bungakukai Prize and the Naoki Prize, and her works have been adapted for television and film.

== Biography ==
Masumi Oshima was born in 1962. She was raised in Nagoya and grew up reading science fiction. At the age of 20 she started writing a script for a play, but eventually turned to writing novels. In 1992, she submitted her story Haru no Tejinaji (lit. Spring Magician) to Bungakukai magazine's new writer contest, and won the 74th Bungakukai Prize.

Oshima's 2003 novel Chocolietta, about a young woman who uses the Federico Fellini film La Strada to recover from her grief, was adapted into a film by screenwriter and director Shiori Kazawa. The film premiered at the 2014 Tokyo International Film Festival and was released nationally in 2015. Oshima's 2009 novel Nijiiro Tenki Ame (lit. Rainbow Weather) and its 2010 sequel Bitter Sugar, about three women whose friendship is tested as they approach the age of 40, were adapted into a 2011 NHK drama called Bitter Sugar, starring Ryō, Emi Wakui, and Sawa Suzuki.

Oshima was first nominated for the Naoki Prize in 2015 for her novel Anata no Hontō no Jinsei wa (lit. Your Real Life), a story about a young writer who discovers that a famous author's works are actually written by someone else. In 2019, Oshima won the 161st Naoki Prize for her novel Uzu: Imoseyama Onna Teikin, Tamamusubi (lit. Whirlpool: Husband and Wife Mountains, A Mirror of Virtuous Women, Requiem), a work of historical fiction about 18th century playwright and puppeteer Hanji Chikamatsu.

== Awards and recognition ==
- 1992: 74th Bungakukai Prize
- 2019: 161st Naoki Prize (2019上)

== Selected works ==
- Chocolietta, 2003, Kadokawa Shoten, ISBN 9784048734462
- Nijiiro Tenki Ame, 2009, Shogakukan, ISBN 9784094083385
- Bitter Sugar, 2010, Shogakukan, ISBN 9784093862790
- Anata no Hontō no Jinsei wa, 2014, Bungeishunjū, ISBN 9784163901367
- Uzu: Imoseyama Onna Teikin, Tamamusubi, 2019, Bungeishunjū, ISBN 9784163909875

=== Adaptations ===
- Bitter Sugar, 2011, NHK
- Chocolietta, 2014
