= Tsukuroi Tatsu Hito (film) =

- Poster
- Kanji: 繕い裁つ人
- Directed by: Yukiko Mishima
- Screenplay by: Tamio Hayashi
- Based on: Tsukuroi Tatsu Hito by Aoi Ikebe
- Produced by: Kaku Kurosawa; Yasushi Utagawa; Takako Oki; Yuichi Shibahara
- Starring: Miki Nakatani; Takahiro Miura; Hairi Katagiri; Haru Kuroki; Hana Sugisaki
- Cinematography: Kazutaka Abe
- Edited by: Hitomi Kato
- Music by: Kobayashi Yohei
- Production companies: Kansai Television; Pony Canyon; Kodansha; Grand Marble; DUB
- Distributed by: Gaga Corporation
- Release date: January 31, 2015 (Japan)
- Running time: 104 minutes
- Country: Japan
- Language: Japanese

Tsukuroi Tatsu Hito (Japanese: 繕い裁つ人; A Stitch of Life) is a 2015 Japanese drama film directed by Yukiko Mishima, starring Miki Nakatani and based on a manga series of the same name written and illustrated by Aoi Ikebe. It was released in Japan by Gaga Corporation on January 31, 2015.

== Cast ==
- Miki Nakatani
- Takahiro Miura
- Hairi Katagiri
- Haru Kuroki
- Hana Sugisaki
- Mie Nakao
- Masatō Ibu
- Kimiko Yo
- Mei Nagano
