= Mariko Hayashi =

Japanese writer

- 林 真理子
- Born: April 1, 1954 (age 72); Yamanashi, Japan
- Education: Nihon University
- Occupation: Writer
- Writing career
- Genres: Essay; Short story; Novel
- Notable works: RunRun wo Katte Ouchi ni Kaerō; Fukigen na Kajitsu; Segodon!
- Notable awards: Naoki Prize; Medal of Honor with Purple Ribbon
- Website: hayashimariko.exblog.jp

Mariko Hayashi (林 真理子, Hayashi Mariko; born April 1, 1954) is a Japanese writer and chairperson of the Nihon University board of directors. Her awards include the 94th Naoki Prize and the Japanese Medal of Honor with Purple Ribbon. Her novels and essays have been widely adapted for television and film, including the 1997 film Fukigen na Kajitsu and the 2018 NHK taiga drama Segodon.

== Early life and education ==
Mariko Hayashi was born in Yamanashi, Japan on April 1, 1954. She attended Hikawa High School in the city of Yamanashi, and went on to graduate from Nihon University, whereupon she took a job writing advertising copy.

== Career ==
=== Debut and early recognition ===
After clashing with the corporate culture in the advertising industry, Hayashi quit her job and worked instead as a freelance copywriter, winning an award for her copywriting on behalf of Seiyu Group, while also writing a series of magazine articles that criticized contemporary advertising. Her autobiographical essay about the experience of becoming self-sufficient and finding success in Tokyo through her copywriting work became the basis for the 1988 NHK television series Shiawase Shigan (lit. Applying for Happiness) starring Tomoyo Harada.

Prompted by contacts in the publishing industry, she wrote her first book, a collection of personal essays about women and social expectations that was published in 1982 under the title RunRun o Katte Ouchi ni Kaerō (lit. Let's Buy Happiness and Go Home). With its positive images of consumerism and career success for women, it became a bestseller. The following year she began writing a regular essay series for Shūkan Bunshun. By 2020 the series was recognized by Guinness World Records as the largest number of essays ever published by one author in the same magazine.

In addition to essays, Hayashi also began writing fiction. Her story Hoshikage no Stella was nominated for the 91st Naoki Prize. Budō ga Me ni Shimeru was nominated for the 92nd Naoki Prize. Kurumi no Ie, about a woman returning to her childhood home after the death of her grandmother, was nominated for the 93rd Naoki Prize and adapted into a 1987 TBS television series starring Ryōko Sakaguchi. In 1986 Hayashi won the 94th Naoki Prize for two short stories, Saishūbin ni Maniaeba (lit. If I Catch the Last Flight), and Kyōto made (lit. Until Kyōto).

In the late 1980s Hayashi became involved in the "Agnes debate", a public controversy over gender, work, and feminism that stemmed from a popular essay by Agnes Chan about bringing her child to work. Hayashi argued that setting different expectations for men and women would result in women losing respect in the workplace. She accused Chan of engaging in a publicity stunt rather than seriously attempting to improve working conditions for women, and as a consequence Hayashi was criticized by feminists who claimed that her denunciation of Chan undermined working mothers.

=== Historical novels and continuing popularity ===
In the 1990s, Hayashi wrote popular historical novels exploring women's lives and challenges. Her 1990 historical novel Mikado no Onna (lit. The Emperor's Woman) fictionalized the life of Utako Shimoda, who resigned as head of Gakushuin Women's College after sustained public accusations of sexual misconduct and political corruption. The book became a bestseller, and literary scholar Mamiko Suzuki credits the book with reviving interest in Shimoda by presenting a positive image of Shimoda's sexual activity, in contrast to the negative portrayals of her personal life presented by her political and professional detractors. In 1994 Hayashi published Byakuren Renren (lit. The Yearning of Byakuren), a fictionalized account of the "Byakuren incident", in which the poet Byakuren Yanagiwara left her husband for another man and exchanged public letters with her husband about the incident in major newspapers. Byakuren Renren received the 8th Shibata Renzaburō Prize, which is awarded to works likely to attract a wide readership.

Hayashi continued writing about women's lives in her non-historical novels, several of which were adapted for television and film. Her 1990 novel Hon wo Yomu Onna (lit. The Woman Who Reads Books), based on her interactions with her own mother, was adapted by NHK into the 2003 drama series Yumemiru Budou (lit. The Grapes You Dream About). Her 1996 novel Fukigen na Kajitsu (lit. The Fruits of Displeasure), about unsatisfied women engaging in extramarital affairs, was adapted multiple times for film and TV, beginning with a 1997 TBS drama adapted for screen by Miho Nakazono and starring Yuriko Ishida in the lead role of Mayako. That same year Shochiku released a film adaptation starring Kaho Minami in the lead role. Fukigen na Kajitsu was adapted again for a 2016 TV Asahi drama series, starring Chiaki Kuriyama as Mayako, which was followed by a miniseries that explored the character's lives after the events of the regular series. For her 1997 collection of stories about the secret lives of women, titled Minna no Himitsu (lit. Everyone's Secrets), Hayashi shared the 32nd Yoshikawa Eiji Prize in 1998 with Hiroko Minagawa. Her contribution to the 2000 anthology Tokyo Stories, titled Ichinen no Nochi (lit. One Year After), was adapted into the 2001 film Tokyo Marigold, starring Rena Tanaka as a young woman finding herself bored after breaking up with her boyfriend.

Hayashi also wrote several novels exploring personal and economic consequences that women face, particularly in professional settings. Her 1999 novel Kosumetikku (lit. Cosmetics), about a woman building her career in the advertising industry, was adapted by screenwriter Miho Nakazono into a 2003 Wowow drama starring Riona Hazuki. From 2000 to 2002, Hayashi wrote the serialized novel Anego, about a woman in her 30s who has achieved career success but is dissatisfied with her life, for Domani, a fashion magazine targeted at working women. The novel was adapted into a 2005 Nippon TV drama starring Ryōko Shinohara. Hayashi's 2010 novel Karyū no Utage (lit. Party in the Lower Reaches), about a housewife whose middle-class financial status is threatened by her irregularly employed son's impending marriage to a woman who also holds no steady job, was made into a 2011 NHK series starring Hitomi Kuroki.

=== Cultural prominence and leadership roles ===
A regular visitor to France throughout her life, Hayashi was named a Chevalier of the French Legion of Honour in 2011, with the medal presented by French ambassador Philippe Faure in a ceremony at the French embassy in Japan. She received the Shimase Romantic Literature award in 2013 for Asukurepiosu no Aijin (lit. Asclepius' Lover), a story about an infectious disease expert who seeks romantic relationships after leaving her high-pressure job. Her 2016 novel Segodon!, a fictionalized account of the rise of Saigō Takamori, was serialized in the magazine Hon no Tabibito and adapted by long-time collaborator and screenwriter Miho Nakazono into the 2018 NHK taiga drama Segodon.

Hayashi received the Japanese Medal of Honor with Purple Ribbon in 2018. As part of Japanese government planning in anticipation of the 2019 Japanese imperial transition, she served on a committee providing expert feedback on proposed names for the new era. After serving for several years in governance roles at the Japan Writers' Association, in 2020 Hayashi became the organization's first woman chairperson. In June 2022, Hayashi was appointed as the chairperson of the Nihon University board of directors. She was selected by a six-person committee to replace Hidetoshi Tanaka, who had served multiple terms as chairperson but had resigned amid accusations of financial impropriety.

== Recognition ==
- 1986: 94th Naoki Prize
- 1995: 8th Shibata Renzaburō Prize
- 1998: 32nd Yoshikawa Eiji Prize
- 2011: Chevalier of the Legion of Honour
- 2013: 20th Shimase Romantic Literature award
- 2018: Medal of Honor

== Selected works ==
- RunRun o Katte Ouchi ni Kaerō (Let's Buy Happiness and Go Home), Shufunotomo, 1982, ISBN 9784079169578
- Mikado no Onna (The Emperor's Woman), Shinchosha, 1990, ISBN 9784103631033
- Byakuren Renren (The Yearning of Byakuren), Chuokoron-Shinsha, 1994, ISBN 9784120023729
- Fukigen na Kajitsu (The Fruits of Displeasure), Bungeishunjū, 1996, ISBN 9784163165400
- Minna no Himitsu (Everyone's Secrets), Kodansha, 1997, ISBN 9784062089340
- Kosumetikku (Cosmetics), Shogakukan, 1999, ISBN 9784093933032
- Anego, Shogakukan, 2003, ISBN 9784093933049
- Karyū no Utage (Party in the Lower Reaches), Asahi Shimbun, 2010, ISBN 9784620107530
- Asukurepiosu no Aijin (Aesclepius' Lover), Shinchosha, 2012, ISBN 9784103631101
- Segodon!, Kadokawa, 2017, ISBN 9784041061701 (vol. 1) ISBN 9784041061725 (vol. 2)
