= Immoral Affairs =

1997 Japanese film

- Japanese DVD cover
- Directed by: Katsuo Naruse
- Screenplay by: Tomomi Tsutsumi
- Story by: Mariko Hayashi
- Starring: Kaho Minami; Isako Washio; Jinpachi Nezu
- Cinematography: Jun'ichi Fujisawa
- Edited by: Ryūji Miyajima
- Music by: Kiyoko Ogino
- Production company: Shochiku
- Release date: October 18, 1997 (Japan)
- Running time: 103 minutes
- Country: Japan
- Language: Japanese

Immoral Affairs (Japanese: 不機嫌な果実, Hepburn: Fukigen na kajitsu) is a 1997 Japanese drama film produced by the Shochiku studio and directed by Katsuo Naruse. It centers on two characters: Mayako, played by Kaho Minami, a young woman who is not content with her husband and begins to have many affairs with other men, and Kiriko Okabe, played by Isako Washio, a woman whom she befriends. Mayako's husband is played by Jinpachi Nezu.

== Cast ==
- Kaho Minami
- Isako Washio
- Jinpachi Nezu
