= Nobori Kiuchi =

Japanese writer

- 木内 昇
- Born: 1967 (age 58–59); Tokyo, Japan
- Education: Chuo University
- Occupations: Writer, novelist
- Writing career
- Language: Japanese
- Genres: Fiction; Novel; Historical fiction
- Notable works: Hyōsa no utau; Kushihiki chimori
- Notable awards: Shibata Renzaburo Award; Chūōkōron Literary Prize; Naoki Prize

Nobori Kiuchi (木内 昇, Kiuchi Nobori) is a Japanese writer of historical fiction. She has won the Shibata Renzaburo Prize, the Chūōkōron Literary Prize, and the Naoki Prize.

== Early life ==
Kiuchi was born in 1967 in Tokyo, Japan. She attended Chuo University, and upon graduation took a publishing job editing various magazines, including the Japanese version of the American teen magazine Sassy. She started her own magazine, then quit the publishing job to work as a freelance writer and editor.

== Writing career ==
Her debut novel Shinsengumi bakumatsu no seiran (新選組幕末の青嵐, Shinsengumi: The Winds of Revolution), set in Kyoto in the late Edo period, was published in 2004. Four years later her book Myōgadani no neko (茗荷谷の猫, A Cat in Myõgodani), a collection of linked stories taking place in Tokyo at different times from the Edo period to the Shōwa period, was published. At the 2nd Waseda University Tsubouchi Shōyō Prize ceremony Yoko Tawada received the Grand Prize, but Kiuchi received the Encouragement Prize for Myōgadani no neko. The next year Kiuchi won the 144th Naoki Prize for her historical novel Hyōsa no utau (漂砂のうたう, Song of Drifting Sands), a story about a samurai and a courtesan in a Nezu red-light district brothel just after the Meiji Restoration. The committee specifically praised Kiuchi's attention to historical detail. Kiuchi won the award on her first nomination, in contrast to co-winner Shūsuke Michio, a five-time Naoki Prize nominee.

Kiuchi's first novel after winning the Naoki Prize was her 2011 book Warai sannen naki mitsuki (笑い三年, 泣き三月, Three Years of Laughing, Three Months of Crying), a story set in Asakusa immediately after the end of World War II. Her novel Kushihikichimori (櫛挽道守, The Way of the Comb Crafter), about a family of Yabuhara comb crafters at the end of the Edo period, was published in 2013. The next year Kushihikichimori won Kiuchi the 27th Shibata Renzaburo Prize for established writers of genre fiction, the 9th Chūōkōron Literary Prize, and the 8th Shinran Prize, which is awarded to a work of fiction deeply rooted in Japanese spiritual culture. Her short story collection Yokomachi yowa (よこまち余話) was published by Chuokoron-Shinsha in 2016. Her book Kyūdō renren (球道恋々) was a finalist for the 34th Oda Sakunosuke Prize in 2017.

== Recognition ==
- 2009 2nd Waseda University Tsubouchi Shōyō Encouragement Prize
- 2011 144th Naoki Prize (2010下)
- 2014 9th Chūōkōron Literary Prize
- 2014 27th Shibata Renzaburo Prize
- 2014 8th Shinran Prize

== Works ==
- Shinsengumi bakumatsu no seiran (新選組幕末の青嵐, Shinsengumi: The Winds of Revolution), Asukomu, 2004, ISBN 9784776201601
- Jimushi naku (地虫鳴く), Kawade Shobō Shinsha, 2005, ISBN 9784309017167
- Myōgadani no neko (茗荷谷の猫, A Cat in Myõgodani), Heibonsha, 2008, ISBN 9784582834062
- Hyōsa no utau (漂砂のうたう, Song of Drifting Sands), Shueisha, 2010, ISBN 9784087713732
- Ukiyo nyōbō share nikki (浮世女房洒落日記), Sonī Magajinzu, 2008, ISBN 9784789733649
- Warai sannen naki mitsuki (笑い三年, 泣き三月, Three Years of Laughing, Three Months of Crying), Bungeishunjū, 2011, ISBN 9784163808505
- Kushihikichimori (櫛挽道守, The Way of the Comb Crafter), Shueisha, 2013, ISBN 9784087715446
- Yokomachi yowa (よこまち余話), Chuokoron-Shinsha, 2016, ISBN 9784120048142
- Kyūdō renren (球道恋々), Shinchosha, 2017, ISBN 9784103509554
