= Ken'ichi Yamamoto =

- Born: July 23, 1956; Kyoto
- Died: February 13, 2014 (aged 57); Kyoto
- Education: M.A.
- Alma mater: Doshisha University, Literature Department
- Occupation: novelist
- Writing career
- Period: 2002 - 2014
- Genre: historical novels
- Notable works: 『火天の城』 『利休にたずねよ』
- Notable awards: Naoki Prize（2009）

Ken'ichi Yamamoto (山本兼一, Yamamoto Ken'ichi; July 23, 1956 – February 13, 2014) was a Japanese writer.

After first being employed by a publisher, Yamamoto, himself, became a full-time writer.

In 2004, he won the Seichō Matsumoto Award for Katen no shiro, and in 2009 the Naoki Prize for Rikyū ni Tazune yo. Both books were made into movies.

Yamamoto died on February 13, 2014, from lung cancer at the age of 57.

== Awards ==
- Seichō Matsumoto Award (2004)
- Naoki Prize (2009)
