= Bread of Happiness =

- Japanese film poster
- Japanese: しあわせのパン
- Directed by: Yukiko Mishima
- Written by: Yukiko Mishima
- Produced by: Takeshi Moriya
- Starring: Tomoyo Harada; Yo Oizumi; Kanna Mori
- Cinematography: Ryu Segawa
- Edited by: Hitomi Kato
- Music by: Goro Yasukawa
- Distributed by: Asmik Ace Entertainment
- Release date: 28 January 2012 (Japan)
- Running time: 114 minutes
- Country: Japan
- Language: Japanese
- Box office: US$717,956

Bread of Happiness (Japanese: しあわせのパン, Hepburn: Shiawase no Pan) is a 2012 Japanese drama film directed by Yukiko Mishima and starring Tomoyo Harada, Yo Oizumi and Kanna Mori.

Bread of Happiness was first released in cinemas located in Hokkaido on 21 January 2012, and was subsequently released in other Japanese cinemas on 28 January 2012. It had grossed US$717,956 as of 29 January 2012.

== Plot ==
Rie and Nao own a bakery-cum-restaurant named Mani on the shores of Lake Toya, Hokkaido. Nao is the baker who bakes the bakery's bread, while Rie is the chef who prepares the food in the restaurant. Graced with beautiful scenery throughout the four seasons, this shop serves a variety of customers, some of whom are having personal problems. However, after they leave the shop, they feel only happiness.

== Cast ==
- Tomoyo Harada as Rie Mizushima
- Yo Oizumi as Nao Mizushima
- Kanna Mori as Kaori Saito
- Yuta Hiraoka as Tokio Yamashita
- Yuki Yagi as Suehisa
- Ken Mitsuishi as Suehisa's father
- Reika Kirishima as Suehisa's mother
- Misako Watanabe as Aya Sakamoto
- Katsuo Nakamura as Shio Sakamoto
- Chikara Honda as the postman
- Nobue Iketani as Mrs. Hirokawa
- Katsuo Nakamura as Mr. Hirokawa
- Morio Agata as Mr. Abe
- Kimiko Yo as Yōko
- Nozomi Ohashi as the voice of the young female narrator

== Production ==
=== Development ===
Bread of Happiness was first announced on 9 September 2010. The film was directed by Yukiko Mishima, who was also in charge of the screenplay. The story of the film is set in Tokyo and Lake Toya, Hokkaido.

It was revealed in the initial announcement that actor Yo Oizumi and actress Tomoyo Harada would star as husband and wife in the film. The film marked the 30th anniversary of actress Harada's debut as an actress. It is also her first main role in a film since the 2006 film Kamiya Etsuko no Seishun.

=== Filming ===
Bread of Happiness was filmed around Lake Toya, which is located in Hokkaido, the home prefecture of Oizumi. Filming started on 9 September 2010. Before filming, Oizumi spent time as a baker's apprentice to prepare for the role.

=== Theme song ===
The theme song of the film is entitled Hitotsu Dake (ひとつだけ), which was originally sung by Akiko Yano and Kyoshiro Imawano, and was first released in 1980.

== Release ==
Bread of Happiness was first released in Hokkaido on 21 January 2012. It subsequently had a small-scale release in 47 cinemas throughout Japan on 28 January 2012. During its debut weekend, the film attracted an audience of 26100, and grossed a total of 36 million yen. This made it the 10th highest-grossing film in the Japanese box office for the weekend of 28–29 January 2012.
