= Princess Maison =

Japanese manga series

- First tankōbon volume cover

プリンセスメゾン (Purinsesu Mezon)
- Genre: Slice of life
- Manga
- Written by: Aoi Ikebe
- Published by: Shogakukan
- Magazine: Yawaraka Spirits
- Original run: August 7, 2014 – November 1, 2018
- Volumes: 6
- Television drama
- Original network: NHK BS Premium
- Original run: October 25, 2016 – December 13, 2016
- Episodes: 8
- icon

Princess Maison (Japanese: プリンセスメゾン, Hepburn: Purinsesu Mezon) is a Japanese web manga series written and illustrated by Aoi Ikebe. It was published on Shogakukan's web magazine Yawaraka Spirits from August 2014 to November 2018, with its chapters collected in six tankōbon volumes. An eight-episode television drama adaptation was broadcast on NHK BS Premium from October to December 2016.

== Media ==
=== Manga ===
Written and illustrated by Aoi Ikebe, Princess Maison was published on Shogakukan's web magazine Yawaraka Spirits from August 7, 2014, to November 1, 2018. Shogakukan collected its chapters in six tankōbon volumes, released from May 12, 2015, to January 11, 2019.

==== Volumes ====
No.	Japanese release date	Japanese ISBN
1	May 12, 2015	978-4-09-187016-2
2	February 12, 2016	978-4-09-187459-7
3	October 19, 2016	978-4-09-187848-9
4	June 12, 2017	978-4-09-189529-5
5	March 12, 2018	978-4-09-189832-6
6	January 11, 2019	978-4-09-860214-8

=== Drama ===
An eight-episode television drama adaptation, starring Aoi Morikawa as Sachi Numagoe, was broadcast on NHK BS Premium from October 25 to December 13, 2016.

== Reception ==
The manga ranked tenth on Kono Manga ga Sugoi! list of best manga of 2016 for female readers. It was nominated for the Yomiuri Shimbun's Sugoi Japan Award 2017. It ranked 50th on the 2018 "Book of the Year" list from Media Factory's Da Vinci magazine, where professional book reviewers, bookstore employees, and Da Vinci readers participate.

== See also ==
- Tsukuroi Tatsu Hito, another manga series by the same author
