= Sonoko Sugimoto =

Japanese novelist

Sonoko Sugimoto (杉本苑子; June 26, 1925 – May 31, 2017) was a Japanese novelist. She was best known for writing historical fiction.

== Biography ==
Sugimoto was born in Ushigome, Tokyo on June 26, 1925. As a child she performed as a stage and radio actor, and practiced traditional Japanese music and dance. She enjoyed books by Natsume Soseki and Mori Ogai. From 1944 to 1945 (during World War II), she worked for the Japanese government. She graduated from Bunka Gakuin with a degree in literature in 1949. She worked at a health center after graduation.

In 1951 and 1952 Sugimoto's first short stories, Sarugaki Shinki (申楽新記) and Rin no Fu (燐の譜) both won awards from the Sunday Mainichi magazine. When she won these awards she met Eiji Yoshikawa, and became his only disciple. She studied with him for ten years. After she finished studying with him, her work began appearing in print again, starting with Kaki no Ki no shita (柿の木の下) in 1961. Her next work, Koshū no Kishi (孤愁の岸) earned the Naoki Prize in 1962.

Sugimoto continued writing historical novels. Her 1977 Takizawa Bakin (滝沢馬琴), which was based on the life of the author by that name, won the Eiji Yoshikawa Award. Two of her novels were adapted into the 1985 Taiga drama, Haru no Hatō. Her 1986 Edo Shōgon (穢土荘厳) won the Joryū Bungaku Prize. In 1987 she was awarded the Medal with Purple Ribbon, one of the Japanese Medals of Honor. In 1995 she was recognized as a Person of Cultural Merit. In 2002 she was awarded the Kikuchi Kan Prize and the Order of Culture. Her collected works were published in 1998 as a 22-volume set.

In her later life she moved to Atami, Shizuoka. Sugimoto died on May 31, 2017.

== Selected works ==
- Sarugaki Shinki (申楽新記)
- Rin no Fu (燐の譜)
- Kaki no Ki no shita (柿の木の下)
- Koshū no Kishi (孤愁の岸)
- Takizawa Bakin (滝沢馬琴)
