= Kieko Watanabe =

Japanese novelist

- 渡辺喜恵子
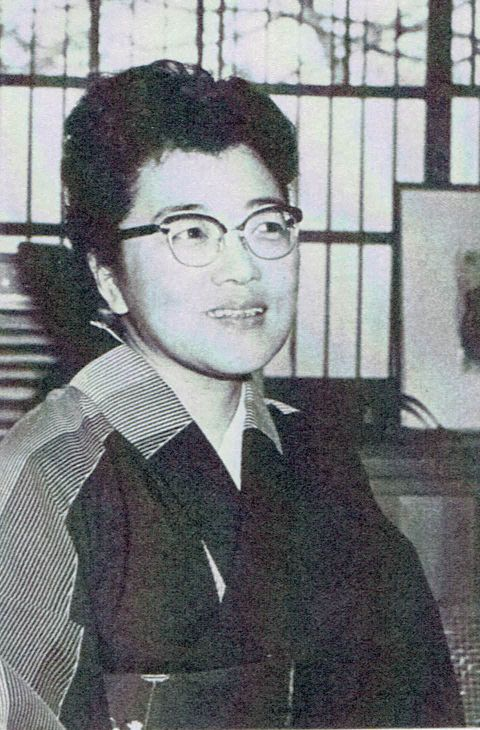
- Born: November 6, 1913; Akita Prefecture
- Died: August 8, 1997 (aged 83)
- Occupation: Novelist

Kieko Watanabe (渡辺喜恵子; November 6, 1913–August 8, 1997) was a Japanese novelist. She is best known for her Naoki Prize-winning work, Mabuchi-gawa (馬淵川). Many of her works were historical fiction.

== Biography ==
Watanabe was born in Akita prefecture, Japan on November 6, 1913. She graduated from high school in 1931, and knew how to sew, arrange flowers, and perform tea ceremony. She moved to Tokyo after graduation. Watanabe married a painter named Shigeru Watanabe in 1935, and they moved to Hiroshima in the same year. Shigeru died a few years later in 1939. After Shigeru's death, Watanabe worked for a fire insurance company. In 1941 she started a printing business. She also began writing after Shigeru's death. She wrote for magazines like Mita Bungaku and Ashita.

Watanabe's first three stories were published in 1942 as Inochi no Atosaki (いのちのあとさき). She had submitted other stories to magazines for publication but they were never received, and presumed to be destroyed in an air raid. She began writing Mabuchi-gawa in 1944, when she evacuated to Iwate prefecture. In 1945 she became an editor for the Nihon Seinen Bungakusha. She remarried in 1949 to a man named Toshihide Kinoshita.

Mabuchi-gawa was published as a serial novel in a magazine in 1955. It won the Naoki Prize in 1959. She went on to write many other historical novels and was nominated for a handful of other awards.

Watanabe was an active philanthropist in the late 1980s. She died on August 8, 1997.

== Reception ==
Writer Sachiko Schierbeck notes that the women that Watanabe writes often live in farm towns, and are tough, sincere, serene, and optimistic. An exhibit of her work that was held in Akita prefecture in 2020 also notes that Watanabe writes about strong women who live in tumultuous times.

Schierbeck also writes that Watanabe's writing conveys a sense of urgency, which brings the reader close to the characters very quickly.

== Selected works ==
- Inochi no Atosaki (いのちのあとさき), 1942
- Mabuchi-gawa (馬淵川), 1959
