= Atsuko Anzai =

Japanese novelist (born 1927)

Atsuko Anzai (安西 篤子, Anzai Atsuko; born August 11, 1927) is a Japanese novelist in Shōwa and Heisei period Japan. Anzai has concentrated her efforts on stories set in China with historical themes, or on contemporary stories based on traditional Chinese motifs.

== Biography ==
Anzai was born on August 11, 1927, in Kobe, Hyōgo Prefecture, where her father was a banker. She accompanied her father when he was assigned to Germany from 1927 to 1932, and to Qingdao and Tianjin in China from 1932 to 1942, where she was exposed to folk tales and literature from both European and Asian traditions. She attended the Qingtao Girls Middle School from 1940 to 1942, where her interest in writing was encouraged by her father. As the situation for Japan in World War II worsened, she was sent from China to Japan, where she graduated from the Kanagawa Daiichi Girls Middle School in Yokohama, Kanagawa Prefecture in 1944.

Anzai married Satoru Tominaka, a businessman, in 1946. She turned to literature after she married; the noted author Nakayama Gishu agreed to take her on as a student in 1953. She formed a literary criticism group called Namboku ("North-South") in 1953, where authors could support each other as well as review each other's work. In 1964, her short story Chanshaoshu no hanashi was awarded the prestigious Naoki Prize. As with many of her works, the story is set in ancient China and is based on an old Chinese legend.

Anzai divorced in 1972. She later worked as a free-lance interviewer and writer.

In 1993, her novel Kurouma was awarded the Japan Women Writer's Award.

She currently resides in Kamakura, Kanagawa.
