= Chiyo Tsutsumi =

- 堤千代
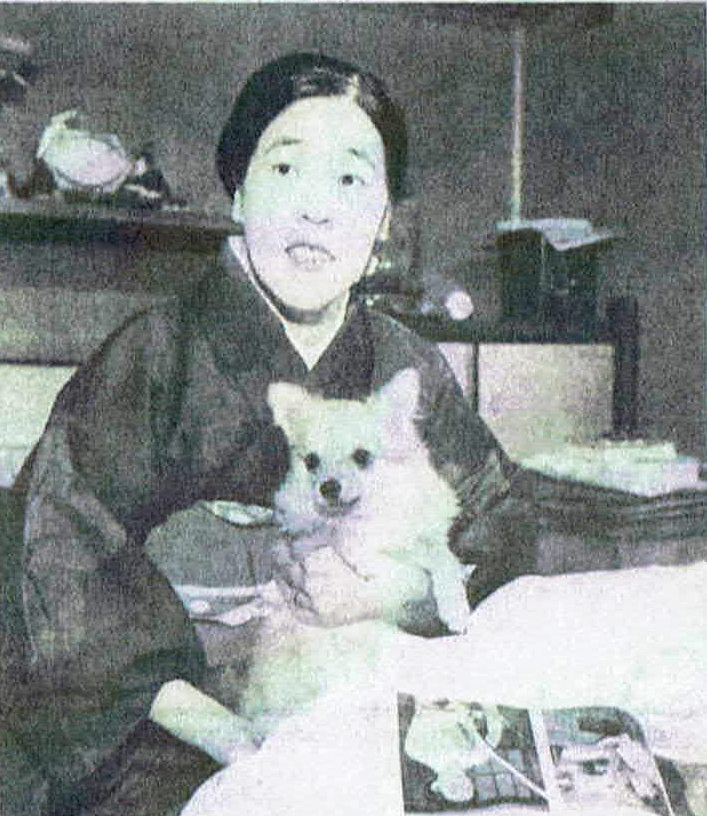
- Chiyo Tsutsumi, published in Katei Yomiuri on October 1, 1953
- Born: September 20, 1917; Tokyo
- Died: November 10, 1955 (aged 38)

Chiyo Tsutsumi (堤 千代; September 20, 1917–November 10, 1955) was a Japanese short story writer. She was best known for her short story Koyubi and her serial novel Waga Ie no Kaze.

== Biography ==
Tsutsumi was born Fumiko Tsutsumi on September 20, 1917, in Tokyo, Japan. She had a congenital heart condition that meant that she could not attend elementary school, and was instead self-taught.

In 1940 Tsutsumi's short story Koyubi (小指) won the Naoki Prize. "Koyubi" and two of Tsutsumi's other works, were about naïve geisha and soldiers. She then wrote Waga Ie no Kaze (我が家の風), which was serialized in Mainichi Shinbun from 1942 to 1943. Her final work was a biography of Yau Yokose. Almost all of Tsutsumi's works were published in magazines and newspapers; she did not write any full-length books. Some of her works, like Waga Ie no Kaze, were adapted into film during the 1940s.

She married Riichi Fukutome, an engineer, in 1944. A few years before her death in 1955, Tsutsumi became partially paralyzed from thrombosis. She continued writing with Riichi's help, and he often drove her to visit art galleries and kabuki plays even after she became paralyzed. Tsutsumi died on November 10, 1955.

Sachiko Schierbeck writes that though Tsutsumi's career was cut short by her death, her work offers a glimpse into Imperial Japan's aggressive nationalism before and during World War II, and notes that her female characters are strong women who embody Confucian values.
