= Tsukuroi Tatsu Hito =

Japanese manga series

- First tankōbon volume cover

繕い裁つ人
- Manga
- Written by: Aoi Ikebe
- Published by: Kodansha
- Magazine: Kiss Plus (2009–2014); Hatsu Kiss (2014)
- Original run: October 8, 2009 – December 13, 2014
- Volumes: 6
- Live-action film
- Tsukuroi Tatsu Hito (2015)

Tsukuroi Tatsu Hito (繕い裁つ人; "Cut Clothing Stitcher") is a Japanese manga series written and illustrated by Aoi Ikebe. It was serialized in Kodansha's josei manga magazines Kiss Plus (2009–2014) and Hatsu Kiss (2014), with its chapters collected in six tankōbon volumes. A live-action film adaptation premiered in January 2015.

== Media ==
=== Manga ===
Written and illustrated by Aoi Ikebe, Tsukuroi Tatsu Hito started in Kodansha's josei manga magazine Kiss Plus on October 8, 2009. (Note: It started in the magazine's November 2009 issue, released on October 8 of that same year.) It ran in the magazine until it ceased publication on February 8, 2014, and the series later ran in Hatsu Kiss from June 13 to December 13, 2014. Kodansha collected its chapters in six tankōbon volumes, released from March 11, 2011,

==== Volumes ====
No.	Japanese release date	Japanese ISBN
1	March 11, 2011	978-4-06-376022-4
2	October 13, 2011	978-4-06-376128-3
3	August 10, 2012	978-4-06-376682-0
4	July 12, 2013	978-4-06-376854-1
5	March 13, 2014	978-4-06-376949-4
6	January 23, 2015	978-4-06-377115-2

=== Live-action film ===
A live-action film adaptation premiered on January 31, 2015.

== Reception ==
The manga ranked 17th on Kono Manga ga Sugoi! list of best manga of 2012 for female readers.

== See also ==
- Princess Maison, another manga series by the same author
