= Tōi Umi kara Kita Coo =

1988 novel by Tamio Kageyama

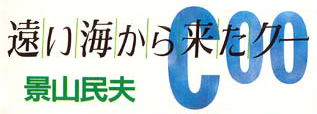
- Logo of Tōi Umi kara Kita Coo (遠い海から来たCOO).

遠い海から来たCOO
- Novel
- Written by: Tamio Kageyama
- Published by: Kadokawa Shoten
- Published: 1988
- Anime film

Coo: Tōi Umi kara Kita Coo
- Directed by: Tetsuo Imazawa
- Written by: Kihachi Okamoto
- Music by: Kazumasa Oda; Nick Wood
- Studio: Toei Animation
- Released: 19 December 1993
- Runtime: 116 minutes

Tōi Umi kara Kita Coo (遠い海から来たCOO; "From a Distant Ocean Came Coo") is a Japanese novel by Tamio Kageyama. It won the Naoki Prize in 1988. It was adapted into an anime film named Coo: Tōi Umi kara Kita Coo (COO: 遠い海から来たCOO; lit. 'Coo: From a Distant Ocean Came Coo'), released in 1993 by Toei Animation. The story revolves around a boy who finds a baby plesiosaur.
