= Two Cigarettes, Three Nights =

2026 drama film by Yukiko Mishima

- Promotional poster
- Japanese: 男ともだち
- Literally: Male Friends
- Directed by: Yukiko Mishima
- Screenplay by: Kaori Sawai
- Based on: 男ともだち by Akane Chihaya
- Produced by: Hiroaki Saito
- Starring: Mayu Matsuoka; Ryo Narita; Yuki Inoue
- Cinematography: Otsuka Ko
- Edited by: Hitomi Kato
- Music by: Goro Yasukawa
- Production company: Happinet Phantom Studios
- Distributed by: Happinet Phantom Studios
- Release dates: October 27, 2026 (TIFF); November 6, 2026 (Theatres)
- Running time: 131 minutes
- Country: Japan
- Language: Japanese

Two Cigarettes, Three Nights (Japanese: 男ともだち, Hepburn: Otoko Tomodachi) is a 2026 romantic drama film directed by Yukiko Mishima. Written by Kaori Sawai, it is based on the 2014 book of the same name by the Japanese writer Akane Chihaya. Starring Mayu Matsuoka, and Ryo Narita, it follows Kanna, an illustrator living in Kyoto, who spends three nights with Haseo, a "guy friend" whom she reunites with after seven years.

The film had its world premiere in International competition at the 39th Tokyo International Film Festival on October 27, 2026. It will be released theatrically on November 6, 2026.

== Synopsis ==
Kanna, an illustrator living in Kyoto, is nearing 30 and feels that her life has become stagnant. Several years earlier, she gained recognition after winning an award for her picture book, but her career has since lost its momentum. Tired of demanding clients, she spends much of her time avoiding her problems and entering unfulfilling relationships. Her life takes an unexpected turn when she receives a phone call from Haseo, a male friend who has understood her unusually well since they first met. After seven years apart, the two reunite. As they spend time together in Kyoto, Toyama and Hiroshima, old feelings and memories return. Over three nights, Haseo's familiar warmth and understanding brings about a major change in her life.

== Cast ==
- Mayu Matsuoka as Kanna
- Ryo Narita as Haseo
- Yuki Inoue as Akihito
- Ayumu Nakajima as Shinji
- Miyu Sakihime as Miho
- Takahiro Miura as Iwasa
- Kimiko Yo as projectionist
- Shinnosuke Ikehata as Narasaki

== Release ==
Two Cigarettes, Three Nights was screened for the World Premiere on October 27, 2026, in the Competition section of the 39th Tokyo International Film Festival, where it competed for Tokyo Grand Prix.

It will be released theatrically on November 6, 2026, by Happinet Phantom Studios after its premiere at Tokyo International Film Festival.

== Accolades ==
Award	Date of ceremony	Category	Recipient	Result	Ref.
Tokyo International Film Festival	4 November 2026	Tokyo Grand Prix	Two Cigarettes, Three Nights	Nominated	
Tokyo International Film Festival	4 November 2026	Best Actor	Ryo Narita	Won	
