= Tamio Kageyama =

Japanese writer

Tamio Kageyama (景山 民夫, Kageyama Tamio; March 20, 1947 in Tokyo, Japan – January 27, 1998) was a Japanese writer.

The former television script writer and essayist won the 99th Naoki Prize in 1988 for his novel Coo: Tooi Umi Kara Kita Coo. The novel was later adapted into an animated film. Kageyama also contributed to the films Sakana kara daiokishin!! (1992), Saraba itoshiki hito yo (1987), and Hoshikuzu kodai no densetsu (1985), and appeared as a judge on the TV series Iron Chef.

Kageyama died at the age of 50 following a house fire at his residence.
