= Shizuko Tōdō =

Japanese novelist (born 1949)

Shizuko Tōdō (藤堂志津子; born March 14, 1949) is a Japanese novelist and essayist. She is best known for writing the novel Ureteyuku Natsu (熟れてゆく夏), which won the 1988 Naoki Prize.

== Biography ==
Tōdō was born Masae Kumagai on September 14, 1949 in Hokkaido, Japan. She grew up in ill health, so she spent a lot of time reading and writing as a child. She especially enjoyed writing poetry. Her first collection of poems was published while she was attending Fuji Women's Junior College. After graduation she went on to work at a life insurance company, then an advertising agency.

Tōdo published several works under her birth name from 1978 onwards. Her first novel she released under her penname was called Madonna no Gotoku. It was published in 1987. It won the Hokkaido Shinbun Prize and was shortlisted for the Naoki Prize. It was later adapted into a film in 1990. Tōdo left the advertising agency soon after the publication of Madonna no Gotoku.

During the same year, she won the Naoki Prize for her work Ureteyuku Natsu (熟れてゆく夏). Her publisher initially printed 8,000 copies of the book, but after the announcement of the award they decided to print 50,000 more. Tōdō went on to win many other awards as well. In 2001 she won the Shimase Renai Bungaku Award for her book Songu obu Sandē (ソング・オブ・サンデー)(Song of Sunday). In 2003 she won the Shibata Renzaburō Award for her novel Aki no Neko (秋の猫).

Tōdō's works are largely romances featuring women who don't believe that the men that they are with will be faithful. Writer Sachiko Schierbeck also points out that there is a hint of lesbianism in Tōdō's stories, which is unusual for Japanese fiction.

== Selected works ==
- Madonna no Gotoku (マドンナのごとく), 1988
- Ureteyuku Natsu (熟れてゆく夏), 1988
- Songu obu Sandē (ソング・オブ・サンデー), 2001
- Aki no Neko (秋の猫), 2003
