= Sanjugo Naoki =

Pen name of Sōichi Uemura

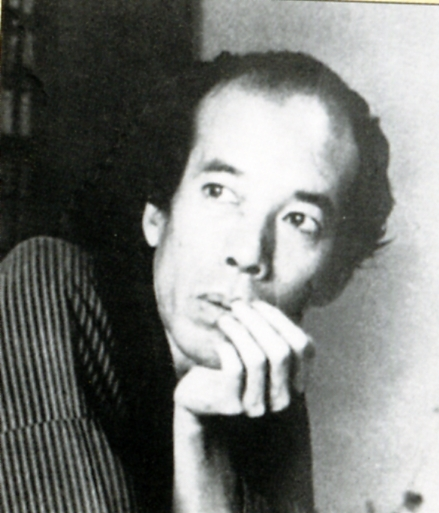
- Naoki Sanjūgo
- Born: Sōichi Uemura; 12 February 1891; Chūō-ku, Osaka, Japan
- Died: 24 February 1934 (aged 43); Tokyo, Japan
- Occupation: Writer
- Writing career
- Genres: novels and literary criticism

Sanjugo Naoki (直木 三十五, Naoki Sanjūgo) was a pen name of a novelist in Taishō and Shōwa period Japan. His real name was Sōichi Uemura (植村 宗一, Uemura Sōichi).

== Early life ==
Naoki Sanjūgo was born in what is now Chūō-ku, Osaka. The noted historian Uemura Seiji, specialist in East Asian history, was his brother. Against the wishes of his father, Naoki attended the preparatory schools of Waseda University to study English Literature but was forced to drop out of school on occasion due to his inability to pay the tuition. In 1920, he collaborated with Ton Satomi, Masao Kume, and Isamu Yoshii on the literary journal Ningen ("Human"). He returned to Osaka shortly after Great Kantō earthquake of 1923. At first, he attempted to work at a cosmetics company, but was soon drawn back to the literary world.

== Literary career ==
At the invitation of Matsutarō Kawaguchi, Naoki started working in Osaka as editor of the literary magazine Kuraku ("Joys and Sorrows"), contributed his own works of fiction as well, and soon began publishing novels. Although interested in the new trends toward the cinema, he experimented with movie script-writing but failed to interest any movie studios. In 1927, he moved back to Tokyo where opportunities looked more promising. He obtained a post at the literary magazine Bungeishunjū, where he developed a reputation for writing scathing literary criticism, mixed with scandalous gossip about the writer, which outraged many of his contemporaries.

In 1929, he had an historical novel, Yui Kongen Taisakki, serialized in a weekly magazine, and a similar historical novel about the Satsuma Rebellion, Nangoku Taiheiki, serialized in a newspaper following year. The success of these established him firmly as a writer of popular fiction.

His novel Mito Komon Kaikokuki, a fictional history of the travels of Tokugawa Mitsukuni in disguise around the country was the basis of a movie starring Ryūnosuke Tsukigata and was the first of nearly fifty of his novels to be made into movies. It later metamorphosed into the extremely long-running television series Mito Kōmon, which remains popular to this day and which is largely responsible for turning the historical Tokugawa Mitsukuni into a folk hero.

Naoki had a reputation for being eccentric, as evidenced by his choice of a pen name, which he changed four times between ages 31 and 35 to match his age (skipping over 34, as four is an unlucky number according to Japanese superstition). When he reached age 35 (Sanjūgo), he decided to keep the same name from that point onward.

As well as historical novels such as Araki Mataemon and Odoriko Gyojoki, Naoki wrote biographies of historical figures — including Kusunoki Masashige, Ashikaga Takauji, and Genkuro Yoshitsune — and contemporary social fiction, including Nihon no Senritsu ("Japan Shudders") and Hikari: Tsumi to Tomoni ("Light: With Crime").

== Death ==
Naoki died in 1934 at the age of 43 from an acute case of Japanese encephalitis. Yasunari Kawabata, with whom Naoki shared a common interest in the game of go, wrote the eulogy for his funeral. His grave is at the temple of Chōshō-ji in Kanazawa-ku, Yokohama.

== Legacy ==
In 1935, on the suggestion of Kikuchi Kan (founder of the Bungeishunjū magazine), Naoki's name was given to an award for popular fiction, the Naoki Prize. Alongside the Akutagawa Prize for new writers, it is one of the most prestigious literary awards in Japan.

== See also ==
- Japanese literature
- List of Japanese authors
- Naoki Prize
