= Aiko Kitahara (novelist) =

Japanese novelist

Aiko Kitahara (北原 亞以子; January 20, 1938 – March 12, 2013) was a Japanese novelist. She is best known for writing historical novels.

== Early life and career ==
Kitahara was born Yoshie Takano (高野 美枝) on January 20, 1938, in what is now Minato, Tokyo. She graduated from Chiba Girls High School in 1956. After graduating she worked briefly at an oil company and then a photography studio, before landing a position as a copywriter for an advertising firm.

== Career ==
Kitahara began writing while working at the advertising firm. In 1969 her story Mama wa shiranakatta no yo (ママは知らなかったのよ) won the Shincho Prize. Another story she wrote received an honorable mention in the same year. She then pivoted to writing historical novels. Her 1989 novel Fukugawa Mioodori Kidoban Goya (深川澪通り木戸番小屋) won the Izumi Kyoka Prize for Literature. In 1993 she won the Naoki Prize for her Koi no wasure-gusa (恋忘れ草), which was a collection of six intertwined stories. It was later translated to English as "The Budding Tree: Six Stories of Love in Edo" by Ian MacDonald.

In 1997 her story Edo Fukyo den (江戸風狂伝) won the Women's Literature Prize. Her book series "Keijiro Engawa Nikki" was adapted into a television drama starring Hideki Takahashi in 2004.

In 2005 her story Yoru no akeru made (夜の明けるまで) won the Yoshikawa Eiji literary award.

Kitahara died of a heart attack in Tokyo on March 12, 2013.

== Style ==
In her historical fiction Kitahara focuses on the struggles of the lower class, especially women. Her protagonists tend to be confident, independent working women who struggle to make their way in the world without the support of fathers or husbands. Her work criticizes the social injustices that occurred during the 19th century, but Publishers Weekly wrote in a review that the protagonists' struggles will also resonate with modern readers.

== Bibliography ==
- Toryanse Fukagawa Ninjo Miodori series, 1989-2013
- Keijiro Engawa Nikki series, 1998-2014
