= Fumio Yamamoto =

Japanese author (1962–2021)

Fumio Yamamoto (13 November 1962 – 13 October 2021) was a Japanese author.

She was born on 13 November 1962 in Yokohama, as Akemi Omura. She graduated from Yokohama-Seiryo Senior High School and the department of economics at Kanagawa University.

Yamamoto won the 1999 Eiji Yoshikawa Prize for New Authors for Loveholic. Her novel Planaria was awarded the Naoki Prize. Yamamoto died on 13 October 2021 of pancreatic cancer in Karuizawa, Nagano, aged 58.
