= Yukiko Mishima =

Japanese film director

- 三島有紀子
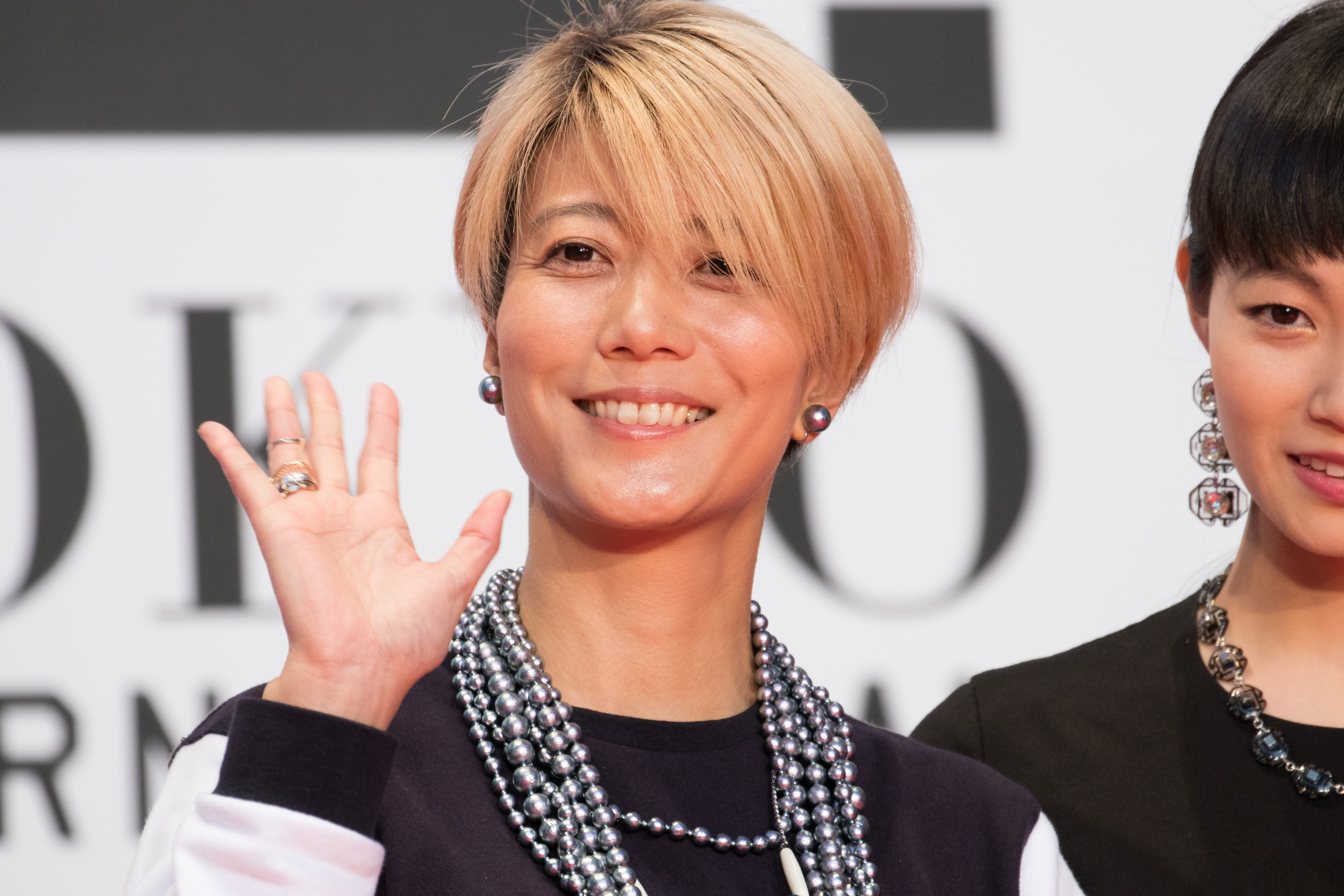
- Yukiko Mishima in 2016
- Born: April 22, 1969 (age 57); Kita-ku, Osaka, Japan
- Occupation: Film director
- Awards: Hochi Film Award, best director, 2017
- Website: www.yukikomishima.com

Yukiko Mishima (Japanese: 三島有紀子) is a Japanese film director born April 22, 1969 in Kita-ku, Osaka.

Her first feature film, Shisei: Nihohi tsuki no gotoku, based on the Jun'ichirō Tanizaki story "The Tatooer", was released in 2009. She received best director from the Hochi Film Award in 2017 for Dear Etranger, and Special Grand Prix of the Jury award at the Montreal World Film Festival. Shape of Red, an adaptation of Rio Shimamoto's 2014 novel Reddo, was released in 2020.

She is a graduate of Kobe College.

== Filmography ==
As director

- Shisei: Nihohi tsuki no gotoku (2009)
- Bread of Happiness (2012)
- A Drop of the Grapevine (2014)
- A Stitch of Life (2015)
- Night's Tightrope (2016)
- Dear Etranger (2017)
- The Antique: Secret of the Old Books (2018)
- Shape of Red (2020)
- Voice (2024)
- Two Cigarettes, Three Nights (2026)

Screenwriter

- 破れたハートを売り物に Kowareta Heart wo Urimono ni / Broken Hearts for Sale (2015)
