= Kitahara Station =

Railway station in Maebashi, Gunma Prefecture, Japan

Kitahara Station 北原駅
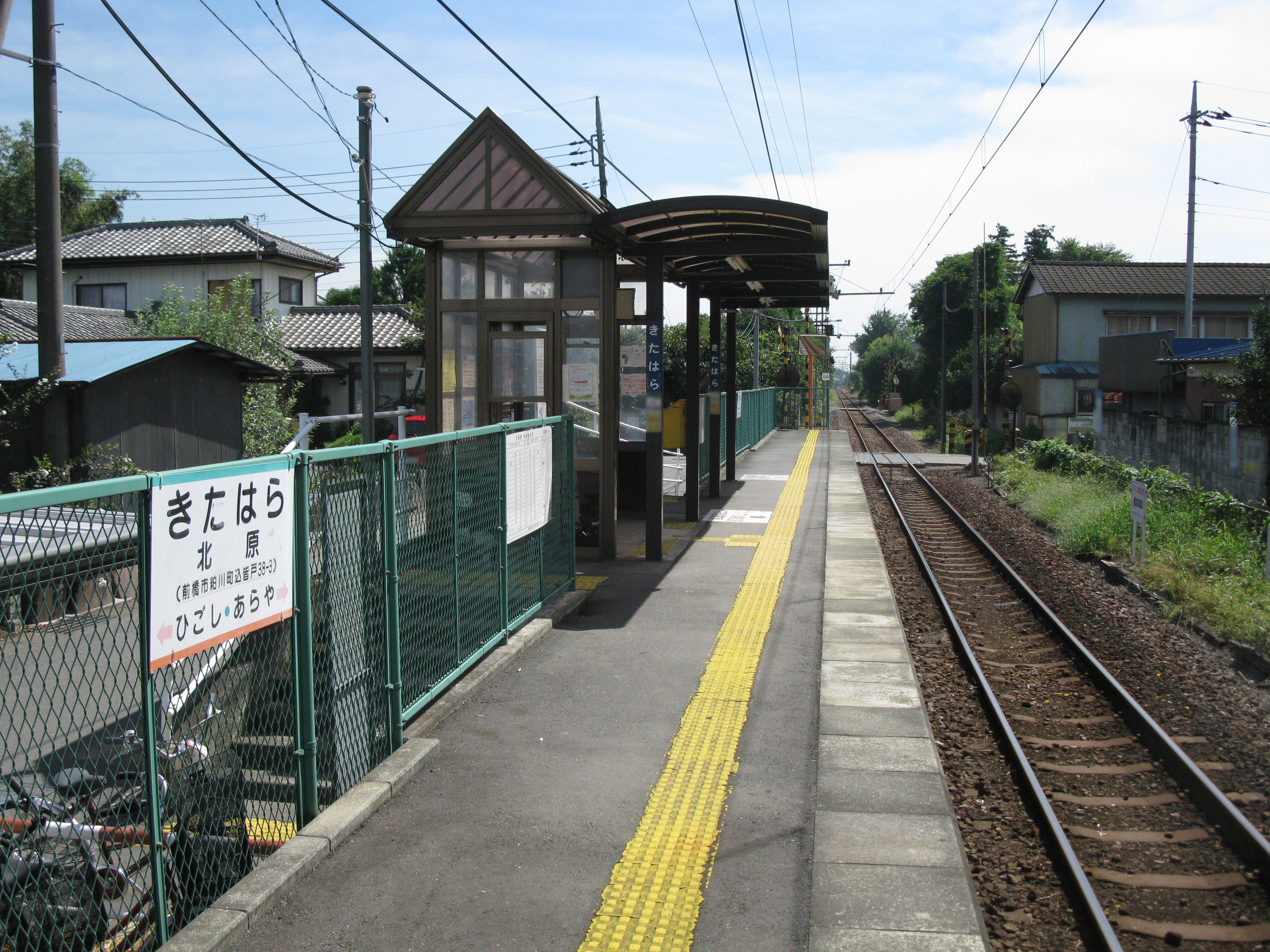
- Kitahara Station in September 2010

General information
- Location: Kasukawamachi Komigaito 38-3, Maebashi-shi, Gunma-ken 371-0216; Japan
- Coordinates: 36.4138°N 139.1848°E
- Operator: Jōmō Electric Railway Company
- Line: ■ Jōmō Line
- Distance: 10.9 km from Chūō-Maebashi
- Platforms: 1 side platform

History
- Opened: July 11, 1939

Passengers
- FY2015: 258

Services
Preceding station	Jōmō Electric Railway	Following station
Higoshi towards Chūō-Maebashi	Jōmō Line	Araya towards Nishi-Kiryū
Location
- Location within Gunma Prefecture Location within Japan

Kitahara Station (北原駅, Kitahara-eki) is a passenger railway station in the city of Maebashi, Gunma Prefecture, Japan, operated by the private railway operator Jōmō Electric Railway Company.

== Lines ==
Kitahara Station is a station on the Jōmō Line, and is located 10.9 kilometers from the terminus of the line at Chūō-Maebashi .

== Station layout ==
The station consists of a single side platform serving traffic in both directions. The station is unattended.

== History ==
Kitahara Station was opened on July 11, 1939.

== Surrounding area ==
The station is located in a suburban rural area.

== See also ==
- List of railway stations in Japan
