= David G. Goodman =

American academic, author, editor and Japanologist (1946-2011)

- Born: January 1, 1946; United States Wisconsin
- Died: July 25, 2011 (aged 65)
- Occupations: violinist, composer
- Years active: author, editor and Japanologist
- Relatives: Fujimoto Kazuko

David G. Goodman (February 12, 1946 – July 25, 2011) was an American academic, author, editor and Japanologist.

== Career ==
Goodman was a professor of Japanese literature at the University of Illinois at Urbana-Champaign. He translated works by Sakae Kubo, Hideo Oguma, and Kunio Kishida.

== Selected works ==
In an overview of writings by and about Goodman, OCLC/WorldCat lists roughly 15+ works in 40+ publications in 2 languages and 2500+ library holdings.

This list is not finished; you can help Wikipedia by adding to it.

- Concerned Theater Japan, 1969–1973
- After apocalypse: four Japanese plays of Hiroshima and Nagasaki, 1986
- Land of volcanic ash: a play in 2 parts by Sakae Kubo, 1988
- Long, long autumn nights: selected poems of Oguma Hideo, 1901–1940, 1989
- Five plays by Kunio Kishida, 1989
- with Masanori Miyazawa: Jews in the Japanese mind: the history and uses of a cultural stereotype, 1995 pbk expanded edition, 2000
- Angura: posters of the Japanese avant-garde, 1999
- The return of the gods: Japanese drama and culture in the 1960s, 2003
