= Go (Kaneshiro novel) =

2000 Japanese novel by Kazuki Kaneshiro

GO
- Author: Kazuki Kaneshiro
- Language: Japanese
- Genre: novel
- Publisher: Kodansha (講談社)
- Publication date: 2000
- Publication place: Japan
- Media type: Print (Paperback)

GO is a novel written by Kazuki Kaneshiro and published in 2000 by Kodansha. GO received a Naoki Prize, an award of high praise in Japan. A film adaptation was released in 2001 that won numerous awards in Japan. An English translation by Takami Nieda was released by AmazonCrossing in 2018.

The story's protagonist is Sugihara, who is a zainichi chosenjin (North Korean nationals in Japan), who falls in love with a Japanese girl. The story revolves around Korean/Chinese racism in Japan with Sugihara changing his Korean name from Lee and moving to a Japanese school from a Japanese Korean school.

== Summary ==
Sugihara, who was a zainichi chosenjin, began studying at a Japanese high-school. Since his father was an ex-pro boxer, Sugihara knew how to fight other Japanese boys who challenges him to a fight because of his nationality. He became friends with a boy whose father is a yakuza and Sugihara's friend invited him to a party where Sugihara meets a girl who would only let him know of her family name: Sakurai. Sugihara never tells Sakurai of his ancestry for he is afraid of her possibility of having racist feelings. One day when one of Sugihara's Korean friends were killed by another Japanese high-school student, Sugihara brought together all his courage to tell Sakurai of his Korean heritage...

== Characters ==
Sugihara Main protagonist. Was a zainichi chosenjin (North Korean nationals in Japan) but changed to zainichi kankokujin (South Korean nationals in Japan). Wins every fight he has been in his Japanese high-school. Known as the "idiot of the school" in his Korean school. Seems to know a lot of trivial facts. Falls in love with Sakurai.

Katou Sugihara's friend in his Japanese school. Katou is Japanese and is a son of a yakuza.

Sakurai Became friends with Sugihara at Katou's birthday party and starts to go out with Sugihara.

Hideyoshi Sugihara's father. First generation zainichi kankokujin. Ex-pro boxer.

Michiko Sugihara's mother. Second generation zainichi kankokujin.

Jong-Il Sugihara's closest friend from the Japanese Korean school. Known as the "genius of the school".
