= Sakae Kubo =

Japanese playwright and novelist

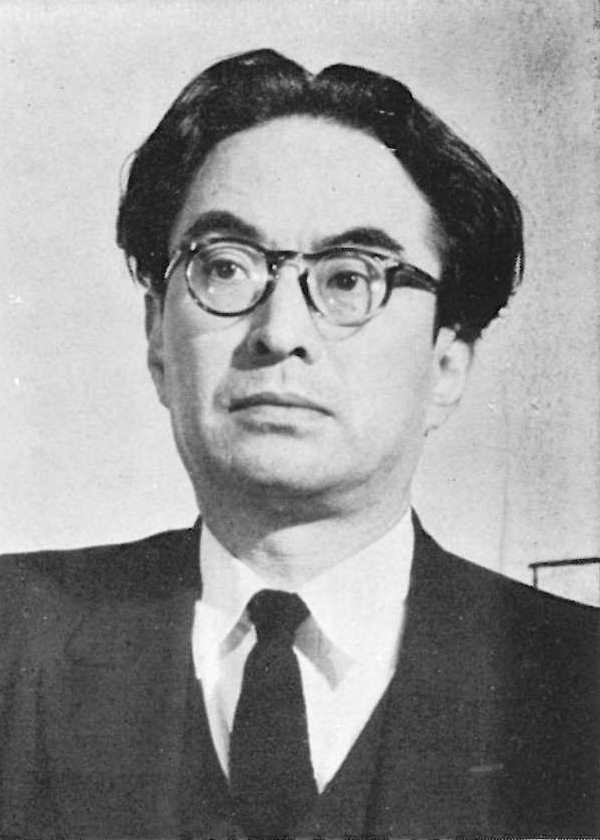
- Born: December 28, 1900; Sapporo, Hokkaido
- Died: March 15, 1958 (aged 57)
- Education: Tokyo Imperial University
- Occupations: playwright, translator
- Writing career
- Language: Japanese and German
- Genre: Shingeki
- Notable work: The Land of Volcanic Ash

Sakae Kubo (久保 栄, Kubo Sakae; December 28, 1900 – March 15, 1958) was a Japanese playwright and director. Kubo studied and translated German literature at Tokyo Imperial University and then soon he became the disciple of another famous playwright and theatre director, Kaoru Osanai. From his mentor, Kubo had adopted Shingeki theater, a new type of drama that developed in Japan in the early 20th century under the influence of Western-style theater. To honor the death of his teacher, Kubo began to write one of his most famous works, which was The Land of Volcanic Ash: A Play in Two Parts, translated by David Goodman. This play was most recognized for its focus on socialism that was depicted in pre-war Japan. It is seen as realist drama, for it describes the struggles of a reform-minded intellectual in the Hokkaido countryside which took place during the Soviet famine of 1932–33.

== Early life ==
Kubo was the second son if seven children in his family, born to his father Hyotaro Kubo. The Kubo family had migrated to Hokkaido in 1898 because they had to assist in their family's brick foundry business. Once Kubo was old enough to start his education, he was placed into care from his father's youngest brother and spent his first three years of grade school in Tokyo. Later, Sakae was reunited with his family of birth and resided back in Hokkaido, but quickly returned to Tokyo for high school. Sakae's father wished for him to become a doctor, but he refused and dropped out of High School in Tokyo in 1919. Instead of studying the physical sciences, he began publishing poetry in Hototogisu and Mizugame, which were two leading magazines for poetry during this time. Shortly after dropping out of high school, Sakae moved back to Hokkaido to practice oil painting and study Japanese literature.

== Literary career ==
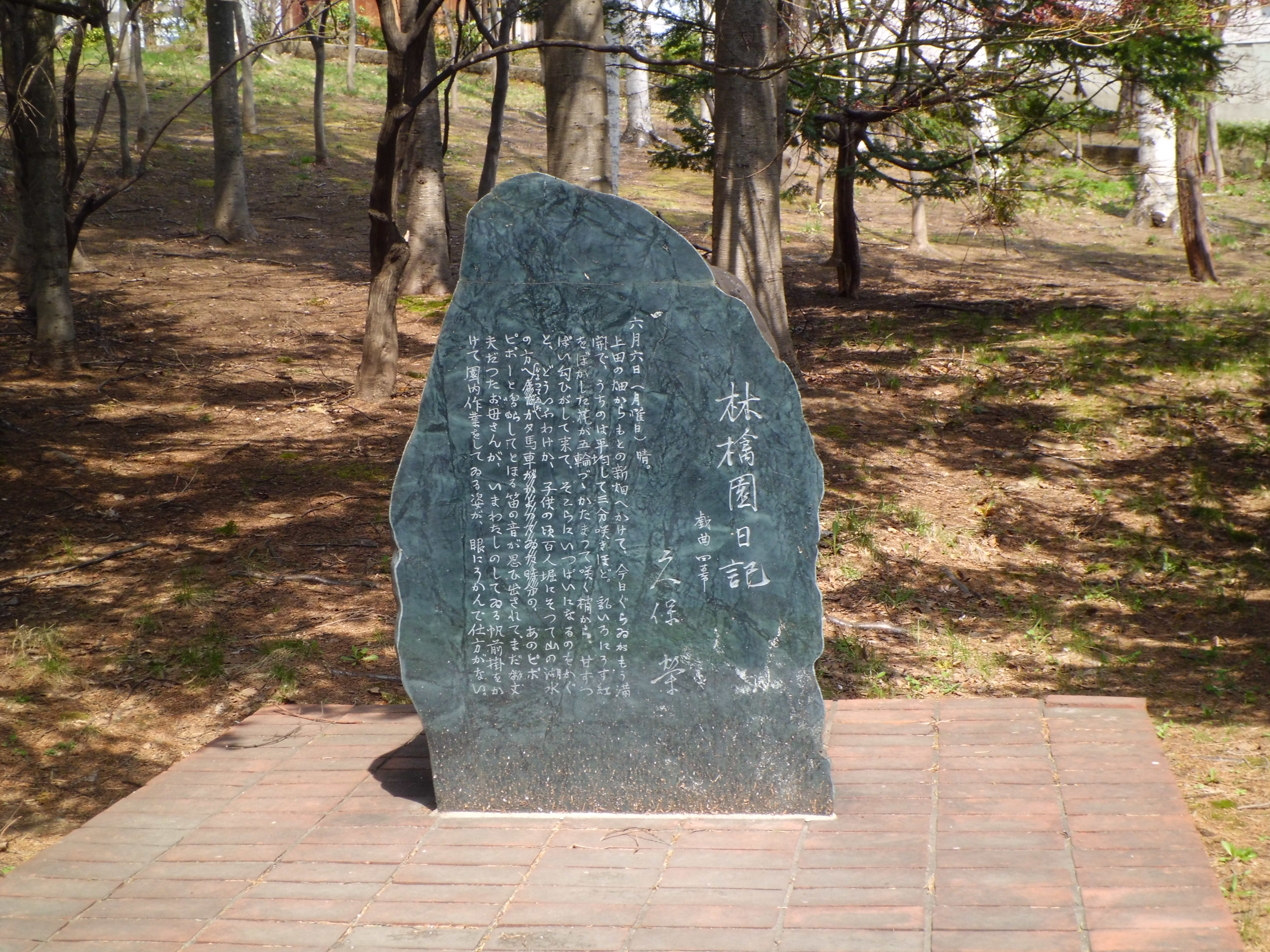
Monument to Sakae Kubo

In April 1923, Sakae had entered the German department at Tokyo Imperial University where he translated works of German drama and finished with a thesis titled "The Historical Plays of Georg Kaiser." During the course of his college career, he translated over thirty German plays, including works from Frank Wedekind and Gerhart Hauptmann After joining the literary department of the Tsukiji Little Theatre in March 1926, he met Kaoru Osanai, the founder of this new theater. After Kubo and became interested in Osanai's new Japanese modern drama, also known as Shingeki style, he soon began to write The Land of Volcanic Ash. This was one of Kubo's most well known works and was dedicated to his mentor, Osanai. Unfortunately, Osanai died shortly after on December 25, 1928, at the age of 47, causing the Tsukiji theater group to split into literary and political camps. Kubo had become the leader of that very political group, who all had engaged in Marxist views and worked under a variety of left-wing troupes. This unnamed group shortly became the Shinkyo Troupe in 1934, which was founded by Kubo after creating the new troupe's new philosophy, "Our realism captures the innermost truths of man and society...they develop toward a higher stage of unity. Without reducing them to stereotypes and without vulgarization, we clarify them in therms of the typical form of conflict and formulate them with artistry and style" After Kubo had finally finished writing The Land of Volcanic Ash, the government had found this play to be problematic, for it showed highly accurate detail of the agricultural conditions of Hokkaido in the mid 1930s. Since Japan was shortly pushed into war with China, the government arrested members of the Shinkyo troupe. in 1940, Kubo was arrested alongside the other group members, and they were imprisoned for their plays, which violated the government's censorship laws.

== The Land of Volcanic Ash ==
The Land of Volcanic Ash was Kubo Sakae's most prized works was written in 1937. It was translated into English by David Goodman in December 1993. This play takes place in Hokkaido from late 1935 to the autumn of 1936 in the city of Obihiro and also the village of Otofuke and describes the life of an agricultural community. Because of this area's dynamic climate, crops were devastated and villages went hungry. There was various opinions in Kubo's style in this play and Murayama Tomoyoshi who had directed this play in 1961–62 believed that Kubo's obscure sense of socialism was nearly impossible to understand which had made it interesting and still continued to inspire audiences. Kubo had tried to present a play that was scientifically accurate, but also something that would change people's opinions on social issues. This play accurately portrayed the agricultural decline in Japan during the same period of time. Because of the crop failures in Japan in the years 1931–35, causing a great depression in Japan's economy, This play shows the hardships that society dealt with.

== Death ==
Ever since Kubo had strayed away from his father's wishes for him to become a doctor and had instead pursued a literary life, he began to experience nervous breakdowns which became an issue throughout Kubo's life. There wasn't a valid reason for his anxiety attacks, but it was noted that he felt unyielding pressure for becoming both a successful writer and fulfilling his father's dream of becoming a scientist. Because of this, Kubo continued to suffer from chronic states of depression over the course of his literary career and was then hospitalized in 1953 as his psychological illness became worse. With no further recovery, Kubo committed suicide on the morning of March 15, 1958. Kubo's death had made an impact in Japanese theater and society because it had regenerated the Shingeki movement. It also rewarded him with one of his motives to overthrow Communism in Japan after the mass arrest of Communists in Japan several years prior of the same date of his suicide.

== Major works ==
Kubo Sakae's writing style was influenced from German literature. He had translated over 30 plays from various renowned German authors.

- Fuashito ningyō (フアシト人形, Fascist Doll; 1931)
- Noborigama (1933)
- Goryokaku kessho (五稜郭血書, Blood Petition from Goryokaku Castle; 1933)
- The Land of Volcanic Ash: A Play in Two Parts (1937)
- Ringoen nikki (林檎園日記, Apple Orchard Diary; 1947)
- Nihon no kisho (日本の気象, Weather in Japan; 1953)
