= Ukō Washio =

Ukō Washio (鷲尾雨工; April 27, 1892–February 9, 1951) was a Japanese novelist. He is best known for his Akutagawa Prize-winning novel Yoshinochō Taiheiki (吉野朝太平記).

== Biography ==
Washio was born Hiroshi Washio on April 27, 1892, in Niigata prefecture, Japan. He graduated from Waseda University in 1915. He enjoyed Western literature, and published a translation of Gabriele D'Annunzio's Francesca da Rimini while he was attending university. After university he worked in publishing. In 1935 he won the Naoki Prize for his novel Yoshinochō Taiheiki (吉野朝太平記). Washio died on February 9, 1951.

== Selected works ==
- Yoshinochō Taiheiki (吉野朝太平記)
