= Kazuki Kaneshiro =

Korean Japanese author (born 1968)

Kazuki Kaneshiro (金城 一紀, Kaneshiro Kazuki; born 29 October 1968) is a Zainichi Korean novelist who was born in Kawaguchi, Saitama.

Later in his life he acquired Japanese citizenship. Due to early influence from his Marxist-Leninist father, he studied at the Chongryon-affiliated elementary school and middle school. Afterwards his father switched his affiliation for Mindan, he instead studied at Hozen High School (保善高等学校) in Tokyo Shibuya. He graduated in Law at Keio University. With the strong confusions with Chongryon, Mindan, and Japanese politics he wanted to promote an alternative "Korean-Japanese" (コリアン・ジャパニーズ) identity to overcome social obstacles, but later he abandoned this concept.

== Bibliography ==
- 2000 Go
- 2003 Taiwa-Hen (対話篇; made into a film as Ren'ai Shousetsu)
- 2007 Eiga-Hen (映画篇)

Zombies Series (ゾンビーズ・シリーズ)

- 2001 Revolution No. 3 (レヴォリューションNO.3)
- 2003 Fly, Daddy, Fly (フライ,ダディ,フライ)
- 2005 SPEED

== Filmography ==
- 2005 Fly, Daddy, Fly - as screenplay writer (see above)
- 2008 SP (TV series) - as screenplay writer
