= Japan Booksellers' Award =

Japanese literary award

- Country: Japan
- First award: 2004; 22 years ago
- Website: hontai.or.jp

Japan Booksellers' Award (本屋大賞, Hon'ya Taishō; lit. "Bookstore Award") is an annual Japanese literary award. It is awarded based on votes by bookstore clerks from all over Japan.

== Winners ==
Nr.	Title	Author	Score	Publisher
2004
1	Hakase no Aishita Sūshiki (博士の愛した数式); English translation: The Housekeeper and the Professor	Yōko Ogawa	202	Shinchosha
2	Kuraimāzu Hai (クライマーズ・ハイ); English translation: Seventeen	Hideo Yokoyama	148	Bungeishunjū
3	Ahiru to Kamo no Coin Locker (アヒルと鴨のコインロッカー)	Kōtarō Isaka	111	Tokyo Sogensha
4	Eien no Deguchi (永遠の出口)	Eto Mori	109	Shueisha
5	Jūryoku Pierrot (重力ピエロ)	Kōtarō Isaka	99	Shinchosha
6	4TEEN	Ira Ishida	76	Shinchosha
7	Dead End no Omoide (デッドエンドの思い出); English translation: Dead-End Memories	Banana Yoshimoto	54	Bungeishunjū
8	Shūsen no Lorelai (終戦のローレライ)	Harutoshi Fukui	51	Kodansha
9	Onmoraki no Kizu (陰摩羅鬼の瑕)	Natsuhiko Kyogoku	38	Kodansha
10	Rarara Kagaku no Ko (ららら科學の子)	Toshihiko Yahagi	38	Bungeishunjū
2005
1	Yoru no Picknick (夜のピクニック)	Riku Onda	374	Shinchosha
2	Ashita no Kioku (明日の記憶)	Hiroshi Ogiwara	302	Kobunsha
3	Iemori Kitan (家守綺譚)	Kaho Nashiki	274	Shinchosha
4	Fukurokōji no Otoko (袋小路の男)	Akiko Itoyama	185	Kodansha
5	Children (チルドレン)	Kōtarō Isaka	155	Kodansha
6	Taigan no Kanojo (対岸の彼女); English translation: Woman on the Other Shore	Mitsuyo Kakuta	153	Bungeishunjū
7	Hannin ni Tsugu (犯人に告ぐ)	Shūsuke Shizukui	138	Futabasha
8	Ōgonryofū (黄金旅風)	Kazuichi Iijima	102	Shogakukan
9	Watashi ga Katarihajimeta Kare wa (私が語りはじめた彼は)	Shion Miura	92	Shinchosha
10	Sono Toki wa Kare ni Yoroshiku (そのときは彼によろしく)	Takuji Ichikawa	74	Shogakukan
2006
1	Tōkyō Tower — Okan to Boku to Tokidoki Oton (東京タワー 〜オカンとボクと、時々、オトン〜)	Lily Franky	279	Fusosha Publishing
2	South Bound (サウスバウンド)	Hideo Okuda	196.5	Kadokawa Shoten
3	Shinigami no Seido (死神の精度)	Kōtarō Isaka	190	Bungeishunjū
4	Yōgisha Ekkusu no Kenshin (容疑者Xの献身); English translation: The Devotion of Suspect X	Keigo Higashino	184.5	Bungeishunjū
5	Sono Hi no mae ni (その日のまえに)	Kiyoshi Shigematsu	179.5	Bungeishunjū
6	Narratage (ナラタージュ)	Rio Shimamoto	162	Kadokawa Shoten
7	Kokuhaku (告白)	Kō Machida	152.5	Chuokoron-Shinsha
8	Beruka Hoenainoka? (ベルカ、吠えないのか?); English translation: Belka, Why Don't You Bark?	Hideo Furukawa	152	Bungeishunjū
9	Kenchō no Hoshi (県庁の星)	Nozomi Katsura	141	Shogakukan
10	Sakura (さくら); English translation: Sakura	Kanako Nishi	135	Shogakukan
11	Maō (魔王)	Kōtarō Isaka	103	Kodansha
2007
1	Isshun no Kaze ni Nare (一瞬の風になれ)	Takako Satō	475.5	Kodansha
2	Yoru wa Mijikashi Aruke yo Otome (夜は短し歩けよ乙女); English translation: The Night is Short, Walk on Girl	Tomihiko Morimi	455	Kadokawa Shoten
3	Kaze ga Tsuyoku Fuite Iru (風が強く吹いている); English translation: Run with the Wind	Shion Miura	247	Shinchosha
4	Shūmatsu no Fool (終末のフール)	Kōtarō Isaka	228	Shueisha
5	Toshokan Sensō (図書館戦争)	Hiro Arikawa	176	MediaWorks
6	Kamogawa Horumo (鴨川ホルモー)	Manabu Makime	175	Sangyō Henshū Center
7	Mīna no Kōshin (ミーナの行進); English translation: Mina's Matchbox	Yōko Ogawa	152.5	Chuokoron-Shinsha
8	Kagehinata ni Saku (陰日向に咲く)	Hitori Gekidan	139	Gentosha
9	Ushinawareta Machi (失われた町)	Aki Misaki	127.5	Shueisha
10	Na mo Naki Doku (名もなき毒)	Miyuki Miyabe	89	Gentosha
2008
1	Golden Slumber (ゴールデンスランバー); English translation: Remote Control	Kōtarō Isaka	509.5	Shinchosha
2	Sacrifice (サクリファイス)	Fumie Kondō	312	Shinchosha
3	Uchōten Kazoku (有頂天家族)	Tomihiko Morimi	280.5	Gentosha
4	Akunin (悪人); English translation: Villain	Shuichi Yoshida	233.5	Asahi Shimbun Publications
5	Eigahen (映画篇)	Kazuki Kaneshiro	227.5	Shueisha
6	Yōkame no Semi (八日目の蝉); English translation: The Eighth Day	Mitsuyo Kakuta	225	Chuokoron-Shinsha
7	Akakuchiba-ke no Densetsu (赤朽葉家の伝説); English translation: Red Girls: The Legend of the Akakuchibas	Kazuki Sakuraba	213.5	Tokyo Sogensha
8	Shika Otoko Ao ni Yoshi (鹿男あをによし)	Manabu Makime	196.5	Gentosha
9	Watashi no Otoko (私の男)	Kazuki Sakuraba	129.5	Bungeishunjū
10	Kassiopeia no Oka de (カシオペアの丘で)	Kiyoshi Shigematsu	126	Kodansha
2009
1	Kokuhaku (告白); English translation: Confessions	Kanae Minato	411	Futabasha
2	Nobō no Shiro (のぼうの城)	Ryō Wada	328	Shogakukan
3	Joker Game (ジョーカー・ゲーム)	Koji Yanagi	243.5	Kadokawa Shoten
4	Tempest (テンペスト)	Eiichi Ikegami	228.5	Kadokawa Shoten
5	Box! (ボックス!)	Naoki Hyakuta	214.5	Ohta Publishing
6	Shin Sekai yori (新世界より)	Yusuke Kishi	207.5	Kodansha
7	Shussei Zenya (出星前夜)	Kazuichi Iijima	203.5	Shogakukan
8	Itamu Hito (悼む人)	Arata Tendō	203.5	Bungeishunjū
9	Ryūsei no Kizuna (流星の絆)	Keigo Higashino	139	Kodansha
10	Modern Times (モダンタイムス)	Kōtarō Isaka	135	Kodansha
2010
1	Tenchi Meisatsu (天地明察)	Tow Ubukata	384.5	Kadokawa Shoten
2	Kamisama no Karte (神様のカルテ)	Sōsuke Natsukawa	294	Shogakukan
3	Yokomichi Yonosuke (横道世之介)	Shūichi Yoshida	270	Mainichi Shimbun Publications
4	Kamusari Nānā Nichijō (神去なあなあ日常); English translation: The Easy Life in Kamusari	Shion Miura	256	Tokuma Shoten
5	Neko o Daite Zō to Oyogu (猫を抱いて象と泳ぐ)	Yōko Ogawa	237	Bungeishunjū
6	Heaven (ヘヴン); English translation: Heaven	Mieko Kawakami	220	Kodansha
7	Fune ni Nore! (船に乗れ!)	Osamu Fujitani	209	Jive
8	Shokubutsu Zukan (植物図鑑)	Hiro Arikawa	182.5	Kadokawa Shoten
9	Shinzanmono (新参者); English translation: Newcomer	Keigo Higashino	130.5	Kodansha
10	1Q84; English translation: 1Q84	Haruki Murakami	91.5	Shinchosha
2011
1	Nazotoki wa Dinner no Ato de (謎解きはディナーのあとで)	Tokuya Higashigawa	386.5	Shogakukan
2	Fugainai Boku wa Sora o Mita (ふがいない僕は空を見た); English translation: So We Look to the Sky	Misumi Kubo	354.5	Shinchosha
3	Penguin Highway (ペンギン・ハイウェイ); English translation: Penguin Highway	Tomihiko Morimi	310	Kadokawa Shoten
4	Ikari o Ageyo (錨を上げよ)	Naoki Hyakuta	307.5	Kodansha
5	Schumann no Yubi (シューマンの指)	Hikaru Okuizumi	270.5	Kodansha
6	Sakebi to Inori (叫びと祈り)	Yū Shizaki	263	Tokyo Sogensha
7	Aku no Kyōten (悪の教典)	Yusuke Kishi	259.5	Bungeishunjū
8	Kamisama no Karte 2 (神様のカルテ2)	Sōsuke Natsukawa	259	Shogakukan
9	Kiken (キケン)	Hiro Arikawa	241	Shinchosha
10	Story Seller (ストーリー・セラー)	Hiro Arikawa	202	Shinchosha
2012
1	Fune o Amu (舟を編む); English translation: The Great Passage	Shion Miura	510	Kobunsha
2	Genocide (ジェノサイド); English translation: Genocide of One	Kazuaki Takano	355.5	Kadokawa Shoten
3	Pieta (ピエタ)	Masumi Oshima	324	Poplar Publishing
4	Kuchibiru ni Uta o (くちびるに歌を)	Otsuichi	265	Shogakukan
5	Hitojichi no Rōdokukai (人質の朗読会)	Yōko Ogawa	213	Chuokoron-Shinsha
6	Yurigokoro (ユリゴコロ); English translation: Nan-Core	Mahokaru Numata	208	Futabasha
7	Dareka ga Tarinai (誰かが足りない)	Natsu Miyashita	173.5	Futabasha
8	Biblia Koshodō no Jiken Techō - Shioriko-san to Kimyō na Kyakujintachi (ビブリア古書堂の事件手帖―栞子さんと奇妙な客人たち)	En Mikami	153	ASCII Media Works
9	Idai Naru Shurarabon (偉大なる、しゅららぼん); English translation: The Great Shu Ra Ra Boom	Manabu Makime	137.5	Kadokawa Shoten
10	Prism (プリズム)	Naoki Hyakuta	72	Gentosha
2013
1	Kaizoku to Yobareta Otoko (海賊とよばれた男)	Naoki Hyakuta	278	Kodansha
2	Rokuyon (64); English translation: Six Four	Hideo Yokoyama	266	Bungeishunjū
3	Rakuen no Canvas (楽園のカンヴァス)	Maha Harada	238.5	Shinchosha
4	Kimi wa Ii Ko (きみはいい子)	Hatsue Nakawaki	212.5	Poplar Publishing
5	Fukuwarai (ふくわらい)	Kanako Nishi	182	Asahi Shimbun Publications
6	Seiten no Mayoi Kujira (晴天の迷いクジラ)	Misumi Kubo	167	Shinchosha
7	Solomon no Gishō (ソロモンの偽証)	Miyuki Miyabe	149.5	Shinchosha
8	Sekai kara Neko ga Kieta nara (世界から猫が消えたなら); English translation: If Cats Disappeared from the World	Genki Kawamura	145.5	Magazine House
9	Hyakunenhō (百年法)	Muneki Yamada	139.5	Kadokawa Shoten
10	Shisha no Teikoku (屍者の帝国)	Project Itoh & Toh EnJoe	109	Kawade Shobō Shinsha
11	Mitsukuni Den (光圀伝)	Tow Ubukata	108	Kadokawa Shoten
2014
1	Murakami Kaizoku no Musume (村上海賊の娘)	Ryō Wada	366.5	Shinchosha
2	Yūbe no Curry, Ashita no Pan (昨夜のカレー、明日のパン)	Izumi Kizara	332	Kawade Shobō Shinsha
3	Shima wa Bokura to (島はぼくらと)	Mizuki Tsujimura	299	Kodansha
4	Sayōnara, Orange (さようなら、オレンジ)	Kei Iwaki	274.5	Chikuma Shobō
5	Toppin Parari no Pūtarō (とっぴんぱらりの風太郎)	Manabu Makime	267.5	Bungeishunjū
6	Kyōjō (教場)	Hiroki Nagaoka	243	Shogakukan
7	Lunch no Akko-chan (ランチのアッコちゃん)	Asako Yuzuki	221	Futabasha
8	Sōzō Radio (想像ラジオ)	Seiko Ito	213.5	Kawade Shobō Shinsha
9	Sei naru Namakemono no Bōken (聖なる怠け者の冒険)	Tomihiko Morimi	156	Asahi Shimbun Publications
10	Kyonen no Fuyu, Kimi to Wakare (去年の冬、きみと別れ); English translation: Last Winter, We Parted	Fuminori Nakamura	136	Gentosha
2015
1	Shika no Ō (鹿の王); English translation: The Deer King	Nahoko Uehashi	383	Kadokawa Shoten
2	Saraba! (サラバ！)	Kanako Nishi	310	Shogakukan
3	Haken Anime! (ハケンアニメ！); English translation: Anime Supremacy!	Mizuki Tsujimura	309.5	Magazine House
4	Hon'yasan no Daiana (本屋さんのダイアナ)	Asako Yuzuki	239	Shinchosha
5	Dobaku no Hana (土漠の花)	Ryoei Tsukimura	236.5	Gentosha
6	Ikari (怒り)	Shuichi Yoshida	231	Chuokoron-Shinsha
7	Mangan (鹿の王)	Honobu Yonezawa	185.5	Shinchosha
8	Captain Thunderbolt (キャプテンサンダーボルト)	Kazushige Abe & Kōtarō Isaka	155	Bungeishunjū
9	Eine Kleine Nachtmusik (アイネクライネナハトムジーク)	Kōtarō Isaka	131	Kadokawa Shoten
10	Okuotoko (億男)	Genki Kawamura	42.5	Magazine House
2016
1	Hitsuji to Hagane no Mori (羊と鋼の森); English translation: The Forest of Wool and Steel	Natsu Miyashita	372	Bungeishunjū
2	Kimi no Suizō o Tabetai (君の膵臓をたべたい); English translation: I Want to Eat Your Pancreas	Yoru Sumino	327.5	Futabasha
3	Sekainohate no Kodomotachi (世界の果てのこどもたち)	Hatsue Nakawaki	274	Kodansha
4	Magai Iiwake (永い言い訳)	Miwa Nishikawa	261	Bungeishunjū
5	Asa ga Kuru (朝が来る)	Mizuki Tsujimura	229.5	Bungeishunjū
6	Ō to Sākasu (王とサーカス)	Honobu Yonezawa	226.5	Tokyo Sogensha
7	Senjō no Kokkutachi (戦場のコックたち)	Nowaki Fukamidori	223	Tokyo Sogensha
8	Ryu (流); English translation: Ryu	Akira Higashiyama	99	Kodansha
9	Kyōdan X (教団X); English translation: Cult X	Fuminori Nakamura	93	Shueisha
10	Hibana (火花); English translation: Spark	Naoki Matayoshi	46	Bungeishunjū
2017
1	Mitsubachi to Enrai (蜜蜂と遠雷); English translation: Honeybees and Distant Thunder	Riku Onda	378.5	Gentosha
2	Mikazuki (みかづき)	Eto Mori	331	Shueisha
3	Tsumi no Koei (罪の声)	Takeshi Shiota	305	Kodansha
4	Tsubaki Bunguten (ツバキ文具店)	Ito Ogawa	302.5	Gentosha
5	Sakurafūdō Monogatari (桜風堂ものがたり)	Saki Murayama	261	PHP Research Institute
6	Anmaku no Guernica (暗幕のゲルニカ)	Maha Harada	249.5	Shinchosha
7	i	Kanako Nishi	160	Poplar Publishing
8	Yakō (夜行)	Tomihiko Morimi	122.5	Shogakukan
9	Konbini Ningen (コンビニ人間); English translation: Convenience Store Woman	Sayaka Murata	70.5	Bungeishunjū
10	Kōhī ga Samenai Uchi ni (コーヒーが冷めないうちに); English translation: Before the Coffee Gets Cold	Toshikazu Kawaguchi	68.5	Sunmark Publishing
2018
1	Kagami no Kojō (かがみの孤城); English translation: Lonely Castle in the Mirror	Mizuki Tsujimura	651	Poplar Publishing
2	Banjō no Himawari (盤上の向日葵)	Yuko Yuzuki	283.5	Chuokoron-Shinsha
3	Shininsō no Satsujin (屍人荘の殺人)	Masahiro Imamura	255	Tokyo Sogensha
4	Tayutaedomo Shizumazu (たゆたえども沈まず)	Maha Harada	227	Gentosha
5	AX (AX アックス); English translation: The Mantis	Kōtarō Isaka	221.5	Kadokawa Shoten
6	Damashie no Kiba (騙し絵の牙)	Takeshi Shiota	214	Kadokawa Shoten
7	Hoshi no Ko (星の子)	Natsuko Imamura	214	Asahi Shimbun Publications
8	Kuzureru nō o Dakishimete (崩れる脳を抱きしめて)	Mikito Chinen	162.5	Jitsugyo no Nihon Sha
9	Hyakka no Mahō (百貨の魔法)	Saki Murayama	162	Poplar Publishing
10	Kirakira Kyōwakoku (キラキラ共和国)	Ito Ogawa	88.5	Gentosha
2019
1	Soshite, Baton wa Watasareta (そして、バトンは渡された); English translation: Someone to Cook For	Maiko Seo	435	Bungeishunjū
2	Hito (ひと)	Fuminori Onodera	297.5	Shodensha
3	Berlin wa Harete iru ka (ベルリンは晴れているか)	Nowaki Fukamidori	282.5	Chikumama Books
4	Nettai (熱帯)	Tomihiko Morimi	250.5	Bungeishunjū
5	Aru Otoko (ある男); English translation: A Man	Keiichiro Hirano	242.5	Bungeishunjū
6	Sazanami no Yoru (さざなみのよる)	Izumi Kizara	239.5	Kawade Shobō Shinsha
7	Ai naki Sekai (愛なき世界)	Shion Miura	208.5	Chuokoron-Shinsha
8	Hitotsu Mugi no Te (ひとつむぎの手)	Mikito Chinen	167.5	Shinchosha
9	Hi no nai Tokoro ni Kemuri wa (火のないところに煙は)	Yo Ashizawa	151.5	Shinchosha
10	Fūga wa Yūga (フーガはユーガ)	Kōtarō Isaka	136.5	Jitsugyo no Nihon Sha
2020
1	Rurō no Tsuki (流浪の月)	Yū Nagira	432	Tokyo Sogensha
2	Lion no Oyatsu (ライオンのおやつ)	Ito Ogawa	380	Poplar Publishing
3	Sen wa, boku o Kaku (線は、僕を描く)	Hiromasa Togami	327	Kodansha
4	Northlight (ノースライト); English translation: The North Light	Hideo Yokoyama	275.5	Shinchosha
5	Netsugen (熱源)	Sōichi Kawagoe	214	Bungeishunjū
6	medium Reibai Tantei Jōtsuka Hisui (medium霊媒探偵城塚翡翠)	Sako Aizawa	198	Kodansha
7	Natsu Monogatari (夏物語); English translation: Breasts and Eggs	Mieko Kawakami	156	Bungeishunjū
8	Mugen no i (ムゲンのi)	Mikito Chinen	147.5	Futabasha
9	Tenchō ga Bakasugite (店長がバカすぎて); English translation: How Can My Manager Be So Stupid	Kazumasa Hayami	105.5	Kadokawa Shoten
10	Mukashi Mukashi aru Tokoro ni, Shitai ga arimashita. (むかしむかしあるところに、死体がありました。)	Aito Aoyagi	91.5	Futabasha
2021
1	52 Hertz no Kujira Tachi (52ヘルツのクジラたち)	Sonoko Machida	365.5	Chuokoron-Shinsha
2	O Sagashi Mono wa Toshu Shitsu made (お探し物は図書室まで); English translation: What You Are Looking for is in the Library	Michiko Aoyama	287.5	Poplar Publishing
3	Inu ga Kita Kisetsu (5犬がいた季節)	Yuki Ibuki	286.5	Futabasha
4	Gyaku Sokuratesu (逆ソクラテス)	Kōtarō Isaka	248	Shueisha
5	Jitenshinagara Kōtensuru (自転しながら公転する)	Fumio Yamamoto	227.5	Shinchosha
6	Hachigatsu no Gin no Yuki (八月の銀の雪)	Shin Iyohara	227.5	Shinchosha
7	Horobi no mae no Shanguri-Ra (滅びの前のシャングリラ)	Yū Nagira	223.5	Chuokoron-Shinsha
8	Alternate (オルタネート)	Shigeaki Kato	169.5	Shinchosha
9	Oshi, Moyu (推し、燃ゆ); English translation: Idol, Burning	Rin Usami	139.5	Kawade Shobō Shinsha
10	Kono hon o Musumu Mono wa (この本を盗む者は); English translation: Whoever Steals This Book	Nowaki Fukamidori	132.5	Kadokawa
2022
1	Dōshi Shōjo yo, Teki o Ute (同志少女よ、敵を撃て)	Tōma Aisaka	463.5	Hayakawa Publishing
2	Aka to Ao to Esukīsu (赤と青とエスキース)	Michiko Aoyama	341.5	PHP Institute
3	Small Worlds (スモールワールズ)	Michi Ichiho	315	Kodansha
4	Seiyoku (正欲)	Ryō Asai	303.5	Shinchosha
5	Rokuri no Usotsukina Daigakusei (六人の嘘つきな大学生); English translation: The Final Six	Akinari Asakura	252.5	Kadokawa
6	Yo ga Akeru (夜が明ける)	Kanako Nishi	211.5	Shinchosha
7	Zangetsuki (残月記)	Masakuni Oda	190.5	Futabasha
8	Garasu no Tō no Satsujin (硝子の塔の殺人)	Mikito Chinen	190.5	Jitsugyo no Nihon Sha
9	Kuro Rōjō (黒牢城); English translation: The Samurai and the Prisoner	Honobu Yonezawa	155.5	Kadokawa
10	Hoshi o Sukuu (星を掬う)	Sonoko Machida	137.5	Chuokoron-Shinsha
2023
1	Nanji, Hoshi no Gotoku (汝、星のごとく)	Yū Nagira	443.5	Kōdansha
2	Rabuka wa Shizuka ni Yumi o Motsu Yasu (ラブカは静かに弓を持つ)	Mio Adan	388	Shueisha
3	Hikari no Toko ni ite ne (光のとこにいてね)	Michi Ichiho	337	Bungeishunjū
4	Bakudan (爆弾)	Katsuhiro Go	307.5	Kodansha
5	Tsuki no Tatsu Hayashi de (月の立つ林で)	Michiko Aoyama	254.5	Poplar Publishing
6	Your Own Quiz (君のクイズ)	Satoshi Ogawa	244	Asahi Shimbun Publications
7	Hakobune (方舟); English translation: The Ark	Haruo Yūki	232	Kodansha
8	Chū Gohan (宙ごはん)	Sonoko Machida	225.5	Shogakukan
9	Kawanohotori ni Tatsu Mono wa (川のほとりに立つ者は)	Haruna Terachi	224.5	Futabasha
10	#Shinsō o Ohanashi Shimasu (#真相をお話しします)	Shinichiro Yūki	86.5	Shinchosha
2024
1	Naruse's Going to Rule the World (成瀬は天下を取りにいく)	Mina Miyajima	525.5	Shinchosha
2	Nene of the Water Mill (水車小屋のネネ)	Kikuko Tsumura	411	Mainichi Shimbun Publishing
3	Sonzai no Subete o (存在のすべてを)	Shiota Takeshi	403	Asahi Shimbun Publishing
4	Spinoza Clinic (スピノザの診察室)	Sosuke Natsukawa	340	Suireisha
5	The Chronicles of Leende (レーエンデ国物語)	Ray Tasaki	263	Kodansha
6	Sisters in Yellow (黄色い家)	Mieko Kawakami	258.5	Chuokoron-shinsha
7	Recovery Kabahiko (リカバリー・カバヒコ)	Michiko Aoyama	227	Kobunsha
8	We Make a Star (星を編む)	Yū Nagira	172	Kodansha
9	The After School Mystery Club: 1 The Swirling Goldfish in the School Pool (放課後ミステリクラブ １金魚の泳ぐプール事件)	Mikito Chinen	148	Rights Inc.
10	About the Gold You Were Supposed to Get (君が手にするはずだった黄金について)	Satoshi Ogawa	131.5	Shinchosha
2025
1	Cafune (カフネ)	Akiko Abe	581.5	Kodansha
2	The Baseball Mom (アルプス席の母)	Kazumasa Hayami	353	Shogakukan
3	Novel (小説)	Mado Nozaki	345	Kodansha
4	We Were Born (禁忌の子)	Mio Yamaguchi	323	Tokyo Sogensha
5	The Marmaid Got Away (人魚が逃げた)	Michiko Aoyama	234.5	PHP Research Institute
6	Spring	Riku Onda	228	Chikuma Shobō
7	If It's Love... (恋とか愛とかやさしさなら)	Michi Ichiho	223	Shogakukan
8	Seishokuki (生殖記)	Ryō Asai	219	Shogakukan
9	Dead Yamada and His Classroom (死んだ山田と教室)	Reisuke Kaneko	196.5	Kodansha
10	Naruse's Going on the Path of Belief (成瀬は信じた道をいく)	Mina Miyajima	163	Shinchosha
2026
1	In the Megachurch (イン・ザ・メガチャーチ)	Ryō Asai	452	Nikkei BP
2	Ripe Persimmon (熟柿)	Shogo Sato	419.5	Kadokawa
3	Prize (Prize―プライズ―)	Yuka Murayama	404.5	Bungeishunjū
4	Epicurean Prescrip (エピクロスの処方箋)	Sosuke Natsukawa	372	Suirinsha
5	The Star at Dawn (暁星)	Kanae Minato	335	Futabasha
6	Killer Sales Techniques for Hitmen (殺し屋の営業術)	Yu Nomiya	321	Kodansha
7	Arika (ありか)	Maiko Seo	229.5	Suirinsha
8	Detective Koishi Won't Fall in Love (探偵小石は恋しない)	Basil Mori	226.5	Shogakukan
9	Lost Identity (失われた貌)	Tomoya Sakurada	164	Shinchosha
10	Farewell to Jabberwock (さよならジャバウォック)	Kōtarō Isaka	131	Futabasha

== Excellent translations ==
Nr.	Title	Author	Translator	Publisher
2012
1	Crime	Ferdinand von Schirach	Shinichi Sakayori	Tokyo Sogensha
2	The People of Paper	Salvador Plascencia	Hikaru Fujii	Hakusuisha
3	Memory Wall	Anthony Doerr	Masae Iwamoto	Shinchosha
3	The Forgotten Garden	Kate Morton	Junko Aoki	Tokyo Sogensha
2013
1	The Tiger's Wife	Téa Obreht	Hikaru Fujii	Shinchosha
2	Jar City	Arnaldur Indriðason	Yumiko Yanagisawa	Tokyo Sogensha
2	Le Dernier Amour d'Arsène Lupin	Maurice Leblanc	Atsushi Hiraoka	Hayakawa Publishing
3	2666	Roberto Bolaño	Fumiaki Noya, Akifumi Uchida & Ryoichi Kuno	Hakusuisha
3	The Ice Queen	Nele Neuhaus	Shinichi Sakayori	Tokyo Sogensha
2014
1	HHhH	Laurent Binet	Kei Takahashi	Tōkyō Sōgensha
2	11/22/63	Stephen King	Ro Shiraishi	Bungeishunjū
2	The Collini Case	Ferdinand von Schirach	Shinichi Sakayori	Tōkyō Sōgensha
2	The Unlikely Pilgrimage of Harold Fry	Rachel Joyce	Yoshiko Kamei	Kōdansha
2015
1	Alex	Pierre Lemaitre	Akemi Tachibana	Bungeishunjū
2	The Truth About the Harry Quebert Affair	Joël Dicker	Akemi Tachibana	Tokyo Sogensha
3	The Martian	Andy Weir	Kazuko Onoda	Hayakawa Publishing
3	Mr. Penumbra's 24-Hour Bookstore	Robin Sloan	Hiroko Shimamura	Tokyo Sogensha
3	The Hundred-Year-Old Man Who Climbed Out the Window and Disappeared	Jonas Jonasson	Naoki Yanase	Nishimura Shoten
2016
1	The Storied Life of A. J. Fikry	Gabrielle Zevin	Fusa Obi	Hayakawa Publishing
2	The Paper Menagerie and Other Stories	Ken Liu	Yoshimichi Furusawa	Hayakawa Publishing
2	The Girl Who Saved the King of Sweden	Jonas Jonasson	Kuriko Nakamura	Nishimura Shoten
3	Submission	Michel Houellebecq	Kuriko Nakamura	Nishimura Shoten
3	Tiānqiáo Shàng de Móshù Shī (天橋上的魔術師)	Wu Ming-yi	Kentarō Amano	Hakusuisha
2017
1	The Hedgehog's Dilemma	Toon Tellegen	Saki Nagayama	Shinchosha
2	All the Light We Cannot See	Anthony Doerr	Hikaru Fujii	Shinchosha
2	United States of Japan	Peter Tieryas	Naoya Nakahara	Hayakawa Publishing
3	The Father	Anton Svensson	Miho Hellén-Halme & Yū Hane	Hayakawa Publishing
2018
1	Caraval	Stephanie Garber	Kaoru Nishimoto	Kinobooks
2	The Borrowed	Chan Ho-kei	Kentarō Amano	Shinchosha
3	Giv: The Story of a Dog and America	Boston Teran	Toshiki Taguchi	Bungeishunjū
2019
1	Magpie Murders	Anthony Horowitz	Ran Yamada	Tokyo Sogensha
2	Bijna Iedereen kon Omvallen	Toon Tellegen	Saki Nagayama	Shinchosha
3	Yuánnián Chūnzhī Jì (元年春之祭)	Lu Qiucha	Bungo Inamura	Hayakawa Publishing
2020
1	Almond	Sohn Won-pyung	Akiko Yajima	Shodensha
2	A Manual for Cleaning Women	Lucia Berlin	Sachiko Kishimoto	Kodansha
3	The Three-Body Problem	Liu Cixin	Nozomi Ōmori, Sakura Mitsuyoshi & Wan Chai	Hayakawa Publishing
2021
1	Where the Crawdads Sing	Delia Owens	Jun Tomohiro	Hayakawa Publishing
2	The Most Precious of Cargoes	Jean-Claude Grumberg	Mariko Kōno	Poplar Publishing
3	The Secrets We Kept	Lara Prescott	Yasuko Yoshizawa	Tokyo Sogensha
2022
1	Counterattacks at Thirty	Sohn Won-pyung	Akiko Yajima	Shodensha
2	A Good Girl's Guide to Murder	Holly Jackson	Kyōko Hattori	Tokyo Sogensha
3	Klara and the Sun	Kazuo Ishiguro	Masao Tsuchiya	Hayakawa Publishing
2023
1	We Begin at the End	Chris Whitaker	Megumi Suzuki	Hayakawa Publishing
2	Peulijeum (프리즘)	Sohn Won-pyung	Akiko Yajima	Shodensha
3	The Grace Year	Kim Liggett	Satomi Horie	Hayakawa Publishing
2024
1	Welcome to the Hyunam-Dong Bookshop	Hwang Boreum	Mika Makino	Shueisha
2	As Good as Dead	Holly Jackson	Kyōko Hattori	Tokyo Sogensha
3	The Second Chance Convenience Store	Kim Ho-yeon	Tokuhachi Yonezu	Shogakukan
2025
1	Fourth Wing	Rebecca Yarros	Fumiyo Harashima	Hayakawa Publishing
2	How to Solve Your Own Murder	Kristen Perrin	Hiromi Kamijo	Tokyo Sogensha
3	We Do Not Part	Han Kang	Mariko Saito	Shueisha
2026
1	Tout le Bleu du Ciel	Mélissa Da Costa	Tomoko Yamamoto	Kodansha
2	The Housemaid	Freida McFadden	Tomoko Takahashi	Hayakawa Publishing
3	James	Percival Everett	Yoshihiko Kihara	Kawade Shobō Shinsha

== Rediscovered books ==
Year	Title	Author	Publisher
2016	Hachipon Ashi no Chō (八本脚の蝶)	Okuba Nikaidō	Poplar Publishing
2017	The Invisible Gorilla	Christopher Chabris and Daniel Simons; Translator: Hiroe Kimura	Bungeishunjū
2018	Ijintachi no Tate (異人たちの館)	Hajime Orihara	Bungeishunjū
2019	Sasutsurugi no Bōrei (サスツルギの亡霊)	Yūsuke Kamiyama	Kōdansha
2020	Muri Nandai ga ō Sugiru (無理難題が多すぎる)	Kenji Tsuchiya	Bungeishunjū
2021	Nai Shigoto no Tsukurikata (ない仕事の作り方)	Jun Miura	Bungeishunjū
2022	Hasen (破船); English translation: Shipwrecks	Akira Yoshimura	Shinchosha
2023	Ochikubo Hime (おちくぼ姫)	Seiko Tanabe	Kadokawa Shoten
2024	Plastic (プラスティック)	Yumehito Inoue	Kōdansha
2025	Nai Mono, Arimasu (ないもの、あります)	Craft Ebbing & Co.	Chikuma Shobō
2026	Tabi no Tanpen-shū: Harunatsu (旅の短篇集 春夏)	Munenori Harada	Kadokawa Shoten

== See also ==
- CD Shop Awards
