= Cafe Funiculi Funicula =

2018 film by Ayuko Tsukahara

- Film poster

Japanese name
- Kanji: コーヒーが冷めないうちに
- Literal meaning: Before the coffee gets cold
Transcriptions
- Revised Hepburn: Kohi ga Samenai Uchi ni
- Directed by: Ayuko Tsukahara
- Written by: Satoko Okudera
- Based on: Kohi ga Samenai Uchi ni by Toshikazu Kawaguchi
- Produced by: Hirano Takashi; Okada Arimasa; Junichi Shindo
- Starring: Kasumi Arimura; Kentarō Itō; Haru; Kento Hayashi
- Cinematography: Norimichi Kasamatsu
- Edited by: Ryūji Miyajima
- Music by: Masaru Yokoyama
- Production companies: Film Face; CBC; RCC Broadcasting; FLaMme; GyaO; Hokkaido Broadcasting; KDDI; MBS; RKB Mainichi Broadcasting; Shizuoka Broadcasting System; Sunmark Publishing; TBS Holdings; TC Entertainment; Tohan Pictures Company; Tohoku Broadcasting Company; Hakuhodo
- Distributed by: Toho
- Release date: September 21, 2018 (Japan)
- Running time: 117 minutes
- Country: Japan
- Language: Japanese

Cafe Funiculi Funicula (Japanese: コーヒーが冷めないうちに, Hepburn: Kohi ga Samenai Uchi ni; lit. "Before the Coffee Gets Cold") is a 2018 Japanese time travel film directed by Ayuko Tsukahara starring Kasumi Arimura. The film is adapted from the novel Before the Coffee Gets Cold by Toshikazu Kawaguchi.

== Cast ==
- Kasumi Arimura as Kazu Tokita
- Kentarō Itō as Ryosuke Shintani
- Haru as Fumiko Kiyokawa
- Kento Hayashi as Goro Katada
- Motoki Fukami as Nagare Tokita
- Wakana Matsumoto as Kumi Hirai
- Hiroko Yakushimaru as Kayo Takatake
- Yō Yoshida as Yaeko Hirai
- Yutaka Matsushige as Yasunori Fusaki
- Yuriko Ishida as The woman in summer clothes
