= The Hundred-Year-Old Man Who Climbed Out of the Window and Disappeared =

The Hundred-Year-Old Man Who Climbed Out of the Window and Disappeared may refer to:

- The Hundred-Year-Old Man Who Climbed Out the Window and Disappeared (novel), a 2009 comic novel by Jonas Jonasson
- The Hundred-Year-Old Man Who Climbed Out of the Window and Disappeared (film), a 2013 comedy film, based on the novel
