= Natsuko Imamura =

Japanese writer (born 1980)

- 今村 夏子
- Born: February 20, 1980 (age 46); Hiroshima, Japan
- Occupation: Writer
- Writing career
- Language: Japanese
- Genre: Fiction
- Notable works: Atarashii musume; Kochira amiko; Hoshi no ko; Ahiru
- Notable awards: Dazai Osamu Prize; Mishima Yukio Prize; Kawai Hayao Story Prize; Noma Literary New Face Prize

Natsuko Imamura (今村 夏子, Imamura Natsuko; born February 20, 1980) is a Japanese writer. She has been nominated three times for the Akutagawa Prize, and won the prize in 2019. She has also won the Dazai Osamu Prize, the Mishima Yukio Prize, the Kawai Hayao Story Prize, and the Noma Literary New Face Prize.

== Biography ==
Imamura was born in Hiroshima, Japan in 1980, and later moved to Osaka to attend university.

She wrote her first story, a novella originally titled Atarashii musume (あたらしい娘, New Girl), while working a temporary job. Atarashii musume won the 26th Dazai Osamu Prize in 2010, and was published with her short story "Pikunikku" ("Picnic") in one volume under the new title Kochira Amiko (こちらあみ子, Amiko Here), which then won the 24th Mishima Yukio Prize.

In 2017, Imamura received the 5th Kawai Hayao Story Prize for her 2016 book Ahiru (あひる). Ahiru was also nominated for the 155th Akutagawa Prize, but the prize went to Sayaka Murata. That same year Imamura won the 39th Noma Literary New Face Prize for Hoshi no ko (星の子, Child of the Stars), a book about a junior high school girl in a family that becomes increasingly involved in a new religious movement, a societal subject dubbed as "shūkyō nisei". Hoshi no ko was also nominated for the 156th Akutagawa Prize, but the prize went to first-time writer Shinsuke Numata.

In 2019, Imamura received her third Akutagawa Prize nomination, for her novel Murasaki no sukaato no onna (むらさきのスカートの女, The Woman in the Purple Skirt). The book, a first-person account of a woman watching her neighbor, won the 161st Akutagawa Prize.

Imamura lives in Osaka with her husband and daughter.

== Recognition ==
- 2010: 26th Dazai Osamu Prize
- 2011: 24th Mishima Yukio Prize
- 2017: 5th Kawai Hayao Story Prize
- 2017: 39th Noma Literary New Face Prize
- 2019: 161st Akutagawa Prize (2019上)

== Selected works ==
- Kochira Amiko (こちらあみ子, Amiko Here), Chikuma Shobō, 2011, ISBN 9784480804303
- Ahiru (あひる, Duck), Shoshi Kankanbo, 2016, ISBN 9784863852419
- Hoshi no ko (星の子, Child of the Stars), Asahi Shimbun Shuppan, 2017, ISBN 9784022514745
- Murasaki no sukaato no onna (むらさきのスカートの女, The Woman in the Purple Skirt), Asahi Shimbun Shuppan, 2019, ISBN 9784022516121
