= Diary of a Void =

2020 novel by Emi Yagi

- Author: Emi Yagi
- Original title: 空芯手帳
- Translator: David Boyd, Lucy North
- Language: Japanese
- Publisher: Chikuma Shobo (Japan); Viking (United States); Vintage (United Kingdom)
- Publication date: 2020
- Publication place: Japan
- English publication date: 2022
- Pages: 184
- ISBN: 9784480804990

Diary of a Void (空芯手帳, Kushin techō) is a novel by Japanese writer Emi Yagi.

== Premise ==
Shibata is a 34-year-old woman who has begun a new job in Tokyo in order to escape sexual harassment from her previous job. However, she finds that as the only woman in her new workplace, her male coworkers assume that she is responsible for doing all the menial tasks, such as clearing away dirty cups. To avoid doing the task again, she lies that she is nauseated by the smell because she is pregnant. Shibata discovers that as long as her colleagues believe that she is an expectant mother, she is no longer expected to perform menial tasks and is even allowed various accommodations to reduce her work responsibilities. However, the longer she maintains the hoax, the more all-absorbing it becomes in her life.

== Publication history ==
The novel was originally published in Japanese in 2020 as Kūshin techō. An English translation was released in 2022.

== Themes and analysis ==
Writing in The Atlantic, Rowan Hisayo Buchanan argued that the novel "is not a story about men versus women — instead, it is about how a pervasive set of rules, biases, and expectations can trap individuals."

== Reception ==
=== Critical reception ===
Olive Fellows of the Harvard Review gave the book a generally positive review, saying that it "leans heavily on a storyline that’s been endlessly recycled in sitcoms and Lifetime movies, but what makes the pregnancy hoax angle fresh here is the lack of overwrought drama... a sweetly surreal novel about seeking respect and human connection in an increasingly isolated world," also noting that "Yagi never allows Diary of a Void to veer into depressing territory." Lauren Oyler of The New York Times described the book as "occasionally heavy-handed," but stated that "Yagi has a light touch for the endless ironies made possible by her premise."

=== Awards and recognition ===
The novel was awarded the 36th Dazai Osamu Prize.
