= What You Are Looking For Is in the Library =

2021 Japanese book

- Author: Michiko Aoyama
- Original title: お探し物は図書室まで
- Translator: Alison Watts
- Publisher: Poplar Publishing, Hanover Square Press
- Publication date: 2021
- English publication date: 2023
- ISBN: 9781804994139

What You Are Looking For Is in the Library (Japanese: お探し物は図書室まで, romanized: O-sagashi mono wa toshoshitsu made) is a collection of five short stories by Japanese writer Michiko Aoyama.

== Premise ==
Five people in Tokyo find themselves struggling with their lives. They each enter the Hatori Community House, where they meet the librarian Sayuri Komachi, who can sense what they need in life and give them the book they need to overcome their problems.

== Reception ==
The book received positive reviews. It was nominated for the 2021 Japan Booksellers' Award and took 2nd place. TIME Magazine named it one of the 100 "must-read" books of 2023, calling it a "refreshing and hopeful look at the power of books and the durability of dreams."

The Irish Times called the book "endearing" and praised the tone and translation. Kirkus Reviews praised the characterization and wrote that the book was a "delightful, gentle unfolding of stories that offer hope and joy to those who find themselves in a pivotal moment in life." Robin Sloan, writing for the New York Times, praised the translation and characterization, and called it an "undeniable page-turner".

The Straits Times gave a more mixed review, calling the prose "almost soppily sentimental", criticizing the descriptions of Komachi as "border[ing] uncomfortably on fat-shaming" and lamenting the lack of background given to Komachi. Alexandra Alter, writing for the New York Times, described What You Are Looking For Is in the Library, alongside books such as Before the Coffee Gets Cold as part of a genre called "healing fiction" popular in Japan and Korea.

NHK broadcast an audiodrama based on the book starring Toshiyuki Nishida and Keiko Takeshita in 2022.
