= The Girl Who Saved the King of Sweden =

2013 novel by Jonas Jonasson

- First edition (Swedish)
- Author: Jonas Jonasson
- Original title: Analfabeten som kunde räkna
- Translator: Rachel Willson-Broyles
- Language: Swedish
- Genre: Novel
- Published: 2013
- Publisher: Piratförlaget, Ecco Press (1st US edition)
- Publication date: 25 September 2013
- Publication place: Sweden
- English publication date: 20 April 2014
- Media type: Print
- Pages: 387
- ISBN: 978-0062329127 (1st US edition)
- OCLC: 859586132
- Dewey Decimal: 839.73.8
- LC Class: PT9877.2.O537 A7313
- Preceded by: The Hundred-Year-Old Man Who Climbed Out the Window and Disappeared
- Followed by: Hitman Anders and the Meaning of It All

The Girl Who Saved the King of Sweden (Swedish: Analfabeten som kunde räkna, "the illiterate who could count") is a Swedish novel written by Jonas Jonasson. The book was first published in 2013 as the second novel of the author, after the best-selling The Hundred-Year-Old Man Who Climbed Out the Window and Disappeared, and translated into English by Rachel Willson-Broyles.

== Plot ==
In 1961, Nombeko Mayeki is born a poor black girl in Soweto. She leaves the slums and is run over by an engineer, who employs her as a cleaner in South Africa's secret nuclear weapons facility. Her good head for mathematics leads her to cover for her drunken and incompetent employer. Two Mossad agents eventually murder her employer, but she outwits them and escapes to Sweden with a trio of female Chinese con artists. Due to a mix-up, Nombeko ends up in possession of a missing South African atom bomb. In Sweden, she settles into a condemned building living in a bizarre commune including a pair of identical twins (both named Holger), the younger of which and his girlfriend are die-hard republicans determined to end the Swedish monarchy. Nombeko and her Swedish boyfriend (the older Holger) are determined to hand the bomb over to the Swedish Prime Minister, but no-one will believe them. Years later, after several attempts to hand over the bomb have failed in absurd circumstances (including the remaining Mossad agent finding and nearly killing them), the younger Holger and his girlfriend kidnap the King and the Prime Minister of Sweden on the spur of the moment from a gala banquet with Chinese President Hu Jintao at the Royal Palace in Stockholm, and prepare to blow up the bomb (and everything within a 61 kilometre radius) in order to end the monarchy. Nombeko calms the situation down, saving the King's life, and her own.
