= Kikuko Tsumura =

Japanese writer (born 1978)

- 津村 記久子
- Born: 1978 (age 47–48); Osaka, Japan
- Occupation: Writer
- Writing career
- Language: Japanese
- Genres: Fiction, short story
- Notable works: Potosu raimu no fune; Myūjikku buresu yū!!; Wākāzu daijesuto
- Notable awards: Akutagawa Prize; Noma Literary Prize; Dazai Osamu Prize; Kawabata Yasunari Prize; Oda Sakunosuke Prize

Kikuko Tsumura (津村 記久子, Tsumura Kikuko) is a Japanese writer from Osaka. She has won numerous Japanese literary awards, including the Akutagawa Prize, the Noma Literary New Face Prize, the Dazai Osamu Prize, the Kawabata Yasunari Prize, and the Oda Sakunosuke Prize.

== Early life and education ==
Tsumura was born in Osaka, Japan in 1978. While commuting to school she read science fiction novels, especially the work of William Gibson, Philip K. Dick, and Kurt Vonnegut, and began writing her own novel, Man'ītā (Maneater), while still a third-year university student. Man'ītā won the 21st Dazai Osamu Prize and was later published in book form under the title Kimi wa eien ni soitsura yori wakai.

== Career ==
In her first job out of college, Tsumura experienced workplace harassment and quit after ten months to retrain and find another position, an experience that inspired her to write stories about young workers. In 2008 Tsumura won the Noma Literary New Face Prize for her book Myūjikku buresu yū!! (Music Bless You!!), and in 2009 her novel Potosu raimu no fune (The Lime Pothos Boat), about a young woman experiencing precarious work, won the 140th Akutagawa Prize. Japanese literature scholar Kendall Heitzman described The Lime Pothos Boat as a "triumph" that "carefully depicts with great nuance a small cast of characters with competing interests and desires." Tsumura's book Wākāzu daijesuto (Workers' Digest), published in 2011, won the 28th Oda Sakunosuke Prize, and in 2013 her short story "Kyūsuitō to kame" ("The Water Tower and the Turtle") won the 39th Kawabata Yasunari Prize. The Japanese Ministry of Education, Culture, Sports, Science and Technology recognized Tsumura's work with a New Artist award in 2016.

Tsumura's writing often employs Kansai-ben, a distinctive Japanese dialect spoken in Osaka and surrounding cities.

== Awards ==
- 2005 21st Dazai Osamu Prize for Man'ītā (Maneater)
- 2008 30th Noma Literary New Face Prize for Myūjikku buresu yū!! (Music Bless You!!)
- 2008 26th Sakuya Konohana Prize
- 2009 140th Akutagawa Prize (2008下) for Potosu raimu no fune (The Lime Pothos Boat)
- 2011 28th Oda Sakunosuke Prize for Wākāzu daijesuto (Workers' Digest)
- 2013 39th Kawabata Yasunari Prize for Kyūsuitō to Kame (The Water Tower and The Turtle)
- 2016 MEXT Award for New Artists for Kono yo ni tayasui shigoto wa nai (There's No Such Thing as an Easy Job)
- 2017 27th Murasaki Shikibu Literature Prize for Fuyūrei Burajiru (A Wandering Ghost in Brazil)

== Works ==
- Areguria to wa shigoto wa dekinai, Chikuma Shobo, 2008, ISBN 9784480804174
- Myūjikku buresu yū!! (Music Bless You!!), Kadokawa Shoten, 2008, ISBN 9784048738422
- Kasōsuki no yukue, Kodansha, 2008, ISBN 9784062145374
- Potosu raimu no fune (The Lime Pothos Boat), Kodansha, 2009, ISBN 9784062152877
- Kimi wa eien ni soitsura yori wakai, Chikuma Shobo, 2009, ISBN 9784480426123
- Wākāzu daijesuto (Workers' Digest), Shueisha, 2011, ISBN 9784087713954
- Matomo na ie no kodomo wa inai, Chikuma Shobo, 2011, ISBN 9784480804327
- Yaritai koto wa nidone dake, Kodansha, 2012, ISBN 9784062177054
- Tonikaku uchi ni kaerimasu, Shinchosha, 2012, ISBN 9784103319818
- Kore kara oinori ni ikimasu, Kadokawa Shoten, 2013, ISBN 9784041104699
- Pōsuke, Chūō Kōron Shinsha, 2013, ISBN 9784120045752
- Evurishingu furouzu, Bungei Shunjū, 2014, ISBN 9784163901121
- Nidone towa tōku ni arite omō mono, Kodansha, 2015, ISBN 9784062190541
- Konoyoni tayasui shigoto wa nai [ : この世にたやすい仕事はない] (There's No Such Thing As An Easy Job), Nikkei Business Publications Inc., 2015, ISBN 9781635576917, translated into English by Polly Barton, Bloomsbury Publishing, Inc. 2020–21. This is the first of Tsumura's books to be translated into English. (Note: Briefly reviewed in the May 31, 2021 issue of The New Yorker, p.63.)
- Kuyokuyo manejimento, Seiryūshuppan, 2016, ISBN 9784860294465
- Makuramoto no hondana, Jitsugyōnonihonsha, 2016, ISBN 9784408536897
- Fuyūrei Burajiru (A Wandering Ghost in Brazil), Bungei Shunjū, 2016, ISBN 9784163905426
- Uesuto uingu (West Wing), Asahi Shimbun Shuppan, 2017, ISBN 9784022648532
- Manuke na koyomi, Heibonsha, 2017, ISBN 9784582837575
- Disu izu za dei (This is the Day), Asahi Shimbun Shuppan, 2018, ISBN 9784022515483

———————
