= Peter Tieryas =

American writer

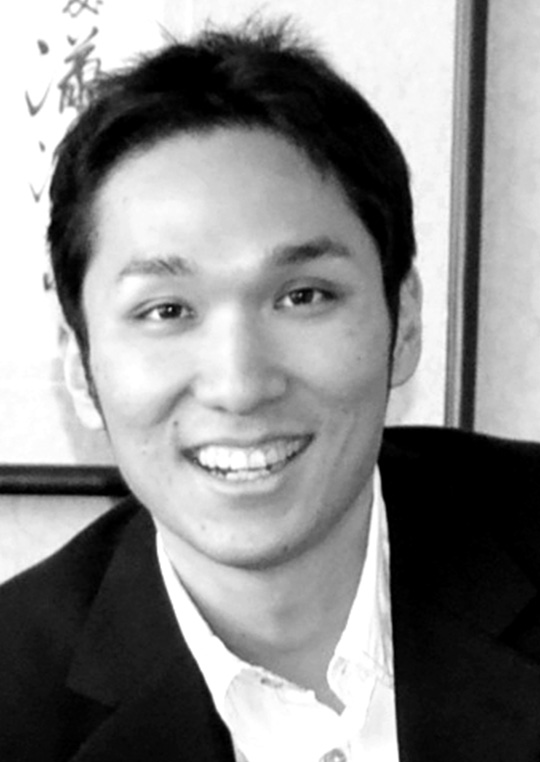
- Peter Tieryas, 2014
- Born: Berkeley, California, United States
- Occupations: writer, VFX artist
- Writing career
- Pen name: Peter Tieryas Liu
- Genres: literary fiction, science fiction
- Website: tieryas.wordpress.com

Peter Tieryas is an American writer. He is the author of Kill Or Be Killed (2025), Bald New World (2014) and the Mecha Samurai Empire series which consists of United States of Japan (2016), Mecha Samurai Empire (2018), and Cyber Shogun Revolution (2020). He attended the University of California Berkeley. Tieryas worked previously at studios like Sony Pictures Imageworks and Pixar Animation Studios. He has also worked at LucasArts as both a technical artist and technical writer, and as a Narrative Director for Nicalis. Many of his stories involve the American Dream, conflicted identity in dystopian futures, and strange romance amidst culture clash.

== Career ==
His literary work has appeared in literary journals including the Indiana Review, Evergreen Review, Existere, Gargoyle Magazine, Hobart (magazine), Kotaku, Kyoto Journal, New Letters, Subaru, Tor.com, and ZYZZYVA.

His filmography includes Luca, Toy Story 4, Lou, Bao, Incredibles 2, Cars 3, Alice in Wonderland, Good Dinosaur, Lightyear, Men in Black 3, Cloudy with a Chance of Meatballs 1 and 2, I Am Legend, Hotel Transylvania, and Guardians of the Galaxy.

He has worked on games including Star Wars: Bounty Hunter, Star Wars Jedi Knight II: Jedi Outcast, Escape from Monkey Island, Gladius, Lair, and Medal of Honor: Pacific Assault.

Tieryas has written, edited, or contributed to the game scenarios for Touch Detective 3 + The Complete Case Files, Cats Away, Cramped Room of Death, IRA, and Dungreed.

His work on Terry in Soul won the 19th Annual VES Award for Outstanding Animated Character in an Animated Feature. He was nominated for the 8th Annual VES Award for Outstanding Animated Character in a Live Action Feature Motion Picture for his work on G-Force.

=== Watering Heaven (2012) and Bald New World (2014) ===
Watering Heaven was longlisted for the Frank O'Connor Int'l Award. Bald New World was longlisted for the Folio Prize in 2015 and listed by BuzzFeed as one of 15 Highly Anticipated Books of 2014. Buzzfeed contributor Richard Thomas described it as: "If you took the world building of Philip K. Dick, and added in the gritty reality and humor of Haruki Murakami, with a touch of Aldous Huxley (of course), you would get Bald New World." Publishers Weekly named Bald New World as one of the Best Science Fiction Books of Summer 2014 in a starred review: "Gorgeous language choices combine with Nick's philosophical journey of personal discovery to create a deceptively deep story." Yahoo, in describing Tieryas's work, stated: "Highlighted by Kollaboration in March as one of three Asian American authors on the rise, Tieryas's debut novel "Bald New World" deals with a global epidemic of follicular proportions... When Baldification hits the planet, the pair find themselves caught up in an sci-fi tinged international conspiracy, turning their penchant for adventure into a series of daring discoveries. David S. Atkinson at HTMLGiant said: "Dystopia has been done a lot, but no one has done it quite like Peter Tieryas. I'd like to enthusiastically welcome Bald New World to the must-read dystopian canon. Old Aldous would be proud." However, in a mixed review, Electric Literature pointed out: "As a first novel, there are some growing pains—particularly the shifts in the pacing, and a certain episodic feel to parts of the narrative. Around the middle there's a shift that might alienate certain readers, where the book suddenly becomes a high-octane romp. The two halves do feel very separate from each other, but the transition is natural (or, to try to avoid spoilers, jarring in the best possible way)."

Peter Tieryas is also the co-founder and co-editor of Entropy Magazine. He frequently collaborates with his wife, artist Angela Xu.

=== Mecha Samurai Empire Series (2016-2020) ===
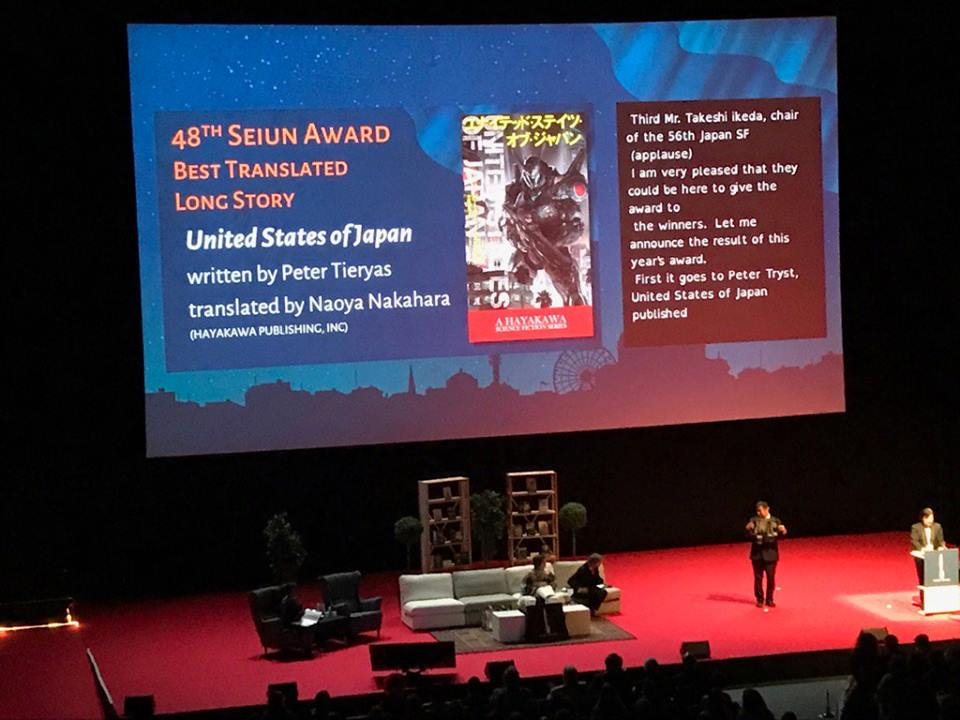
United States of Japan at Helsinki World Con 2017

The Mecha Samurai Empire series is composed of three books, United States of Japan, Mecha Samurai Empire, and Cyber Shogun Revolution.

United States of Japan (2016) began as "a story revolving around the tragic events on the Asian side of WWII." The book is inspired by The Man in the High Castle, his time at Electronic Arts, and his experiences traveling in Asia.

Popular Mechanics included United States of Japan as one of 16 Sci-Fi Things To Look Forward to in 2016, stating: "It's more the cyberpunk dystopia William Gibson promised us than the actual 1980s we know, with giant mechs enforcing the law and police trying to squash an underground gaming success that lets players imagine what might've happened if the allied powers won World War II. It sounds like a perfect patchwork of multiple sci-fi and anime subgenres rolled into one novel." Publishers Weekly named USJ as one of the top 10 anticipated Science Fiction, Fantasy, and Horror books. Kirkus Reviews listed it as one of "The Speculative Fiction Books You Can't Miss in March." The Verge named the novel as one of the Best Books Science Fiction and Fantasy Novels of 2016.

Financial Times stated, "The novel deftly portrays the horrors of oppression but also, with its giant military robots, sumo wrestlers and body-transforming technology, is a gleeful love letter to Japanese pop culture." Barnes & Noble Science Fiction and Fantasy Blog said, "United States of Japan mixes alt-history with pulp-history, the plausible with the fantastical, in a vision of the 1980s with the glossy sheen and rain-slick neon of vintage cyberpunk." Anthony Jones of SF Book Reviews stated: "United States of Japan is a tremendous book; it's got a wonderfully dark and rich atmosphere, great action, intelligent and twisted story and above all, not only does it pay homage to one of the finest authors of the 20th century but also continues one of his most celebrated and yet most difficult works — simply wonderful." io9 reviewer Andrew Liptak wrote, "Tieryas has created a unique alternate world and populated it with fantastic characters and fixtures." In a mixed review, N. Ho Sang of SF Signal writes: "United States of Japan is a smart, gut-wrenching alternative reality that blurs lines between hope with a focus on emotional truths of human nature," but "there are small moments where transitions in environment, scenes and character developments may present themselves as sudden shifts, and feel slightly jarring."

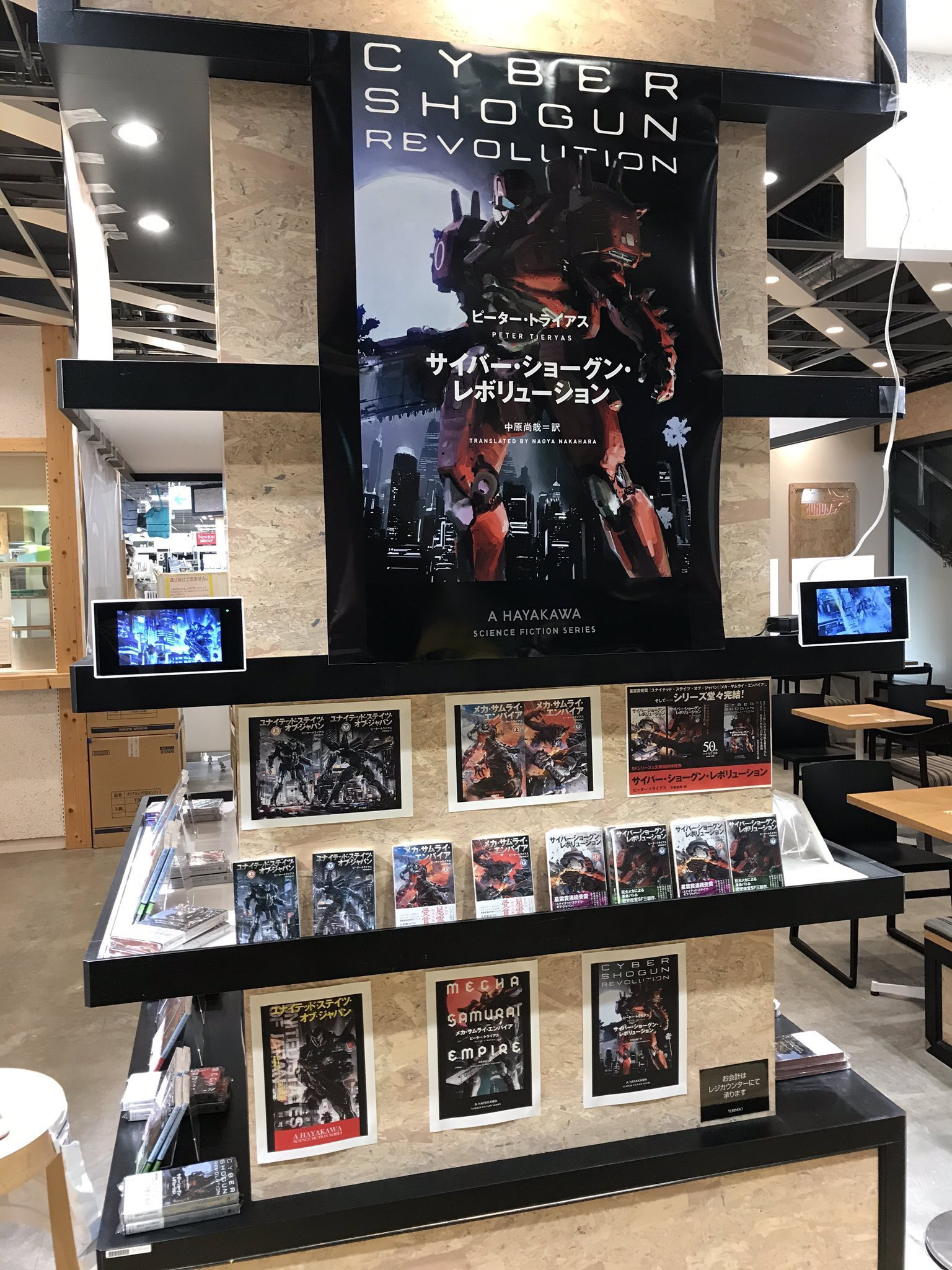
Cyber Shogun Revolution art gallery in the Yurindo Bookstore in Akihabara, Japan.

United States of Japan has been translated and published in Japan, Spain, Chile, China, Colombia, Czech Republic, and Mexico. It became a Nikkei Best Seller and the Japanese publication went to 7th printing in the first month, receiving acclaim from Asahi Shimbun, Yomiuri Shimbun, and Gizmodo Japan. S-F Magazine's Yearly Poll of Japan's Top Science Fiction selected United States of Japan as #2 of the best Best International Science Fiction. It won the 2017 Seiun Award and won 2nd Place For the Japan Booksellers' Award.

Mecha Samurai Empire, published by Ace Roc Books in 2018, is a standalone book in the USJ universe focusing on the mecha wars between the Nazis and the United States of Japan. Amazon Book Reviews listed Mecha as one of the top Science Fiction and Fantasy Books of September 2018, stating, "Readers of alternate history will enjoy the details of the Japanese culture enfolded into the US and the ongoing tensions with the Nazis, while the plot itself packs a punch." Financial Times included Mecha Samurai Empire as one of the best science fiction books of 2018, describing it as "action-packed and rousing." Syfy Wire said the book was "an adrenalized fusion of Philip K. Dick's The Man in the High Castle and Guillermo del Toro's Pacific Rim as rampaging robots prowl a very different America."

Hideo Kojima praised the book, stating it intermixes "the experience of cinema, literature, anime, comics, and gaming" and "is the new generation of Science Fiction we've been waiting for!"

It won the 2019 Seiun Award.

The third book, Cyber Shogun Revolution, is also a standalone book featuring two new characters who fight against the mysterious terrorist, Bloody Mary. Den of Geek described it as " jam packed with giant robot action, and while it's the ethical questions that stick with me, there's a tremendous amount of fun in reading about mecha going after each other with plasma swords and chain saws." An art gallery featuring art from the entire series was showcased at the Story Cafe in the Yurindo Bookstore at Akihabara, Japan.

=== Kill Or Be Killed (2025) ===
Kill Or Be Killed is an illustrated novella from AWA Studios with Mike Choi and in partnership with acclaimed producer Roy Lee’s Vertigo Entertainment for the FUTURE OF FEAR anthology. Bleeding Cool called the novella "a chilling whodunit for the social media age." Bloody Disgusting described it as "page-turning prose with razor-sharp social commentary, brought chillingly to life through Mike Choi’s haunting illustrations that immerse readers in a near-future world that feels all too real."

== Literary influences ==
Tieryas has cited Cordwainer Smith, Philip K. Dick, Pearl Buck, Franz Kafka, Herman Melville, Margaret Weis, Alan Moore, Kameron Hurley, Ken Liu, Maxine Hong Kingston, George Orwell, Sylvia Plath, John Steinbeck, Cao Xueqin, and the Biblical Book of Ecclesiastes as literary influences.
