= Whoever Steals This Book =

Novel by Nowaki Fukamidori

- Novel volume cover (hardcover edition)

この本を盗む者は (Kono Hon o Nusumu Mono wa)
- Genre: Fantasy, mystery, yuri
- Novel
- Written by: Nowaki Fukamidori
- Published by: Kadokawa Shoten
- English publisher: NA: Yen Press
- Imprint: Kadokawa Bunko (paperback)
- Published: October 8, 2020 (hardcover); June 13, 2023 (paperback)
- Manga
- Written by: Nowaki Fukamidori
- Illustrated by: Kakeru Sora
- Published by: Kadokawa Shoten
- English publisher: NA: Yen Press
- Imprint: Kadokawa Comics A
- Magazine: Young Ace
- Original run: December 3, 2021 – March 3, 2023
- Volumes: 3
- Anime film
- Directed by: Daisei Fukuoka
- Written by: Yasuhiro Nakanishi
- Music by: Michiru Ōshima
- Studio: Kagokan
- Licensed by: NA: Crunchyroll
- Released: December 26, 2025
- Runtime: 85 minutes
- icon

Whoever Steals This Book (Japanese: この本を盗む者は, Hepburn: Kono Hon o Nusumu Mono wa) is a Japanese novel written by Nowaki Fukamidori. It was published by Kadokawa Shoten in October 2020, with a paperback edition being released under its Kadokawa Bunko imprint in June 2023. A manga adaptation illustrated by Kakeru Sora was serialized in Kadokawa Shoten's Young Ace magazine from December 2021 to March 2023 and was compiled into three tankōbon volumes. An anime film adaptation produced by Kagokan premiered in Japan in December 2025.

== Premise ==
Mifuyu Mikura, a high school girl whose family has a long history of book collecting, has not inherited her great-grandfather and father's love for books. Her great-grandfather set up a library, known as the Mikura Hall, which became popular among the locals. However, it was closed to the public following a theft incident, with rumors spreading about the nature of its closure. One day, Mifuyu visits Mikura Hall following complaints from the neighbors. There, she encounters a talisman that came from a stolen book, warning that consequences were to happen if the book was stolen. Mifuyu then accidentally triggers a curse that transforms the town. A mysterious girl named Mashiro appears, saying that only by finding the book's thief will the town return to normal. The two set off on a journey to find the book thief and save the town.

== Characters ==
Mifuyu Mikura (御倉 深冬, Mikura Mifuyu)
Voiced by: Rin Kataoka
A member of the Mikura family, which has long been known for their love of books. However, she did not inherit this interest, instead feeling disdain towards books. Her mother died when she was young, leaving her with just her father.
Mashiro (真白)
Voiced by: Sora Tamaki
A mysterious and cool girl who joins Mifuyu on her journey. In contrast to Mifuyu, she is a book lover. She has the ability to turn into a white dog.
Hirune Mikura (御倉 ひるね, Mikura Hirune)
Voiced by: Nao Tōyama
Mifuyu's aunt, who is the caretaker of Mikura Hall. As her brother Ayumu, Mifuyu's father, is in the hospital recovering from an injury, she is currently taking care of Mifuyu.
Ayumu Mikura (御倉 あゆむ, Mikura Ayumu)
Voiced by: Junichi Suwabe
Mifuyu's father, who runs a dojo hall. He is currently hospitalized following a cycling accident.
Keiko Yosano (与謝野 蛍子, Yosano Keiko)
Voiced by: Shizuka Itō
Takafumi Haruta (春田 貴文, Haruta Takafumi)
Voiced by: Shimba Tsuchiya
Tamaki Mikura (御倉 たまき, Mikura Tamaki)
Voiced by: Romi Park
Junichirō Kaname (要純 一郎, Kaname Junichirō)
Voiced by: Shigeru Chiba
Tanbi Che (チェ・タンビ, Che Tanbi)
Voiced by: Ryōta Suzuki
Natsume Harada (原田 夏芽, Harada Natsume)
Voiced by: Reina Ueda
Osamu Kikuchida (菊地田 治, Kikuchida Osamu)
Voiced by: Tomokazu Seki
Shiori Haruta (春田 栞, Haruta Shiori)
Voiced by: Rie Takahashi
Kakihara (柿原)
Voiced by: Yō Taichi
Hiroda (廣田)
Voiced by: Makoto Koichi
Takayama (高山)
Voiced by: Yumiri Hanamori
Osanai (小山内)
Voiced by: Hitomi Ueda
Uhara (羽原)
Voiced by: Manaka Iwami
Mysterious Man (謎の男, Nazo no Otoko)
Voiced by: Jun Fukuyama
Kazune Mikura (御倉和音, Mikura Kazune)
Voiced by: Inori Minase
Coffeehouse Owner (喫茶店のマスター, Kissaten no Masutā)
Voiced by: Akio Otsuka
Negima (ねぎま)
Voiced by: Shun Horie
Regular at the Coffeehouse (常連客, Jōren Kyaku)
Voiced by: Masaya Matsukaze

== Media ==
=== Novel ===
No.	Original release date	Original ISBN	English release date	English ISBN
1	October 8, 2020 (hardcover); June 13, 2023 (paperback)	978-4-04-109269-9 (hardcover); 978-4-04-113411-5 (paperback)	February 18, 2025	979-8-8554-0317-6

=== Manga ===
A manga adaptation illustrated by Kakeru Sora was serialized in Kadokawa Shoten's seinen manga magazine Young Ace from December 3, 2021, to March 3, 2023. The manga's chapters were collected into three tankōbon volumes from June 3, 2022, to April 4, 2023. The manga adaptation is also licensed in English by Yen Press.

No.	Original release date	Original ISBN	English release date	English ISBN
1	June 3, 2022	978-4-04-112385-0	February 20, 2024	978-1-9753-7135-7
2	November 4, 2022	978-4-04-113057-5	June 18, 2024	978-1-9753-7229-3
3	April 4, 2023	978-4-04-113511-2	October 15, 2024	978-1-9753-9028-0

=== Anime film ===
An anime film adaptation was announced on June 3, 2025. The film is produced by Kagokan and directed by Daisei Fukuoka, from a screenplay written by Yasuhiro Nakanishi, characters designed by Keiko Kurosawa, and music composed by Michiru Ōshima. It was released in Japan by Kadokawa Animation on December 26, 2025, after being previously scheduled for 2026. The film's theme song is "Share", performed by Yuki. Crunchyroll licensed the film for a theatrical release in North America.

== Reception ==
The novel was nominated for the 2021 Japan Booksellers' Award.
