= Kiyoshi Shigematsu =

Japanese writer (born 1963)

- Born: March 6, 1963 (age 63); Kume, Okayama Prefecture, Japan
- Occupations: Writer, novelist
- Years active: 1991–present
- Notable work: Naifu (Knife) (1997), Eiji (1999), Bitamin F (Vitamin F) (2000)

Kiyoshi Shigematsu (重松 清, Shigematsu Kiyoshi; born 6 March 1963) is a contemporary Japanese writer. He is one of the best-selling authors in Japan, and the major theme of his novels is about family. His most notable works include Naifu (ナイフ) (1997), Eiji (エイジ) (1999) and Bitamin F (ビタミンF) (2000).

Shigematsu's works in other genre including journals, editorials and critics are highly commended. He also worked in novelising screenplays.

== Biography ==
Shigematsu was born in Kume, Okayama Prefecture in Japan in 1963. He spent most of his youth in Yamaguchi Prefecture. After he has graduated from Yamaguchi Senior High School in 1981, he went to Tokyo at the age of 18.

Shigematsu's life has changed during his years studying in Waseda University School of Education. Katsumi Togo (東郷 克美 Tōgō Katsumi) was his mentor. Since his third year of study, he worked as an editorial staff for Waseda University's literary journal, Waseda bungaku. At that time, Kenji Nakagami was the mentor of the editorial department. Shigematsu once mentioned that his works showed the influence of Nakagami. In fact, Shigematsu seldom read any books until he became the editorial staff of the journal, and thus he could barely involve in the members' conversation. He therefore every time memorised the names of the writers and titles of the novels they mentioned, and searched in libraries and book stores afterwards. He spent most of his money he got from the scholarship on books and read as much as he could, in the hope that he would be able to join the conversation one day.

After graduating from Waseda University, he worked for Kadokawa Shoten as an editorial writer. He later worked as a freelance writer using over 20 pen names, including Akira Tamura (田村 章 Tamura Akira) and Koshir Okada (岡田 幸四郎 Okada Kōshirō), when he novalised dramas and films, wrote for magazines and sometimes took on ghostwriting works.

In 1991, Shigematsu debut as an author with his first novel, Bifoa Ran (Before Run). He distinguished himself as a young adult writer, focusing on themes including bullying, juvenile crime and domestic problems.

Shigematsu suffered from a speech disorder known as stammering or stuttering when he was young, and he could hardly pronounce words starting with the sound "k", which made him struggled a lot when pronouncing his own name, Kiyoshi. Shigematsu projected his own experience in his novel "Kiyoshiko" (きよしこ) (2002).

In 2007, Shigematsu wrote the lyrics for the theme song, Meguriai, for the 74th The Nationwide Contest of Music sponsored by NHK (secondary division). The same year, Shigematsu also contributed over thirty stories, entitled "A Thousand Years of Dreams", to the video game Lost Odyssey.

== Awards ==
- 1999 Naifu (ナイフ) - Tsubota Shōji Literary Prize
- 1999 Eiji (エイジ) - 14th Yamamoto Shūgorō Prize
- 2000 Bitamin F (ビタミンF) - 124th Naoki Prize
- 2001 Jūjika (十字架) - 44th Yoshikawa Eiji Literary Prize
- 2006 Sono Hi no Mae ni (その日のまえに) - 3rd Japan Booksellers' Award (5th place)
- 2008 Kassiopeia no Oka de (カシオペアの丘で) - 5th Japan Booksellers' Award (10th place)'
- 2014 Zetsumetsu Shōnen (ゼツメツ少年) - 68th Mainichi Shuppan Literary Prize

== Nominations ==
- 1994 Miharitō kara Zutto (見張り塔から ずっと) - 8th Yamamoto Shūgorō Prize
- 1996 Osanago Warera ni Umare (幼な子われらに生まれ) - 18th Yoshikawa Eiji Literary Prize
- 1997 Naifu (ナイフ) - 11th Yamamoto Shūgorō Prize
- 1998 Teinen Gojira (定年ゴジラ) - 119th Naoki Prize
- 2000 Kakashi no Natsuyasumi (カカシの夏休み) - 123rd Naoki Prize

== Works ==
Novels

1990s

Title	Year	Publisher
ビフォア・ラン; Bifoa Ran	1991; 1998	KK Bestsellers; Gentosha Bunko
私が嫌いな私; Watashi ga Kiraina Watashi	1992	Ohta Publishing
四十回のまばたき; Yonjyukai no Mabataki	1993; 2000	Kadokawa Shoten; Gentosha Bunko
バック・ビート; Bakku Bīto	1994	Fusosha Publishing
見張り塔からずっと; Miharitō kara Zutto	1995; 1999	Kadokawa Shoten; Shincho Bunko
舞姫通信; Maihime Tsushin	1995; 1999	Shinchosha; Shincho Bunko
幼子われらに生まれ; Osanago Warera ni Umare	1996; 1999	Kadokawa Shoten; Gentosha Literary Publication
ナイフ; Naifu	1997; 2000	Shinchosha; Shincho Bunko
定年ゴジラ; Teinen Gojira	1998; 2001	Kodansha; Kodansha Bunko
エイジ; Eiji	1999; 2001; 2004	Asahi Shimbun Publications Inc. Asahi Bunko; Shincho Bunko
日曜日の夕刊; Nichiyōbi no Yūkan	1999	The Mainichi Newspapers Co., Ltd.
半パン・デイズ; Hanpan Deizu	1999; 2002	Kodansha; Kodansha Bunko

2000s

Title	Year	Publisher
カカシの夏休み; Kakashi no Natsuyasumi	2000; 2003	Bungeishunjū; Bunshun Bunko
ビタミンF; Bitamin F	2000; 2003	Shinchosha; Shincho Bunko
さつき断景; Satsuki Dankei; Retitled:星に願いを さつき断景; Hoshi ni Negai wo Satsuki Dankei	2000; 2004; 2008	Shodensha; Shodensha Bunko; Shincho Bunko
リビング; Ribingu	2000; 2003	Chuokoron-Shinsha; Chuko Bunko
隣人; Rinjin; Retitled: 世紀末の隣人; Seikisue no Rinjin	2001 2003	Kodansha Kodansha Bunko
口笛吹いて; Kuchibue Fuite	2001; 2004	Bungeishunjū; Bunshun Bunko
かっぽん屋; Kapponya	2002	Kadokawa Bunko
流星ワゴン; Ryusei Wagon	2002; 2005	Kodansha; Kodansha Bunko
熱球; Nekkyu	2002; 2004; 2007	Tokuma Shoten; Tokuma Bunko; Shincho Bunko
小さき者へ; Chisaki Mono e	2002; 2006	The Mainichi Newspapers Co., Ltd. Shincho Bunko
きよしこ; Kiyoshiko	2002; 2005	Shinchosha; Shincho Bunko
トワイライト; Towai Raito	2002; 2005	Bungeishunjū; Bunshun Bunko
疾走; Shissō	2003; 2005	Kadokawa Shoten; Kadokawa Bunko
哀愁的東京; Aishūteki Tōkyō	2003; 2006	Kobunsha; Kadokawa Bunko
お父さんエラい!単身赴任二十人の仲間たち; Otōsan Erai! Tanshin Funin Nijyunin no Nakamatachi; Retitled: ニッポンの単身赴任; Nippon no Tanshin Funin	2003 2005	Kodansha Kodansha Bunko
送り火; Okuri Bi	2003; 2007	Bungeishunjū; Bunshun Bunko
ニッポンの課長; Nippon no Kachō	2004; 2006	Nikkei Business Publications; Kodansha Bunko
卒業; Sotsugyō	2004; 2006	Shinchosha; Shincho Bunko
いとしのヒナゴン; Itoshi no Hinagon	2004; 2007	Bungeishunjū; Bunshun Bunko
その日のまえに; Sono Hi no Mae ni	2005; 2008	Bungeishunjū; Bunshun Bunko
きみの友だち; Kimi no Tomodachi	2005; 2008	Shinchosha; Shincho Bunko
娘に語るお父さんの歴史; Musume ni Kataru Otōsan no Rekishi	2006	Chikuma Purimā Shinshō
小学五年生; Shōgaku Gonensei	2007; 2009	Bungeishunjū; Bunshun Bunko
カシオペアの丘で; Kassiopeia no Oka de	2007; 2010	Kodansha Kodansha Bunko
くちぶえ番長; Kuchibue Banchō	2007	Shincho Bunko
青い鳥; Aoi Tori	2007; 2010	Shinchosha; Shincho Bunko
永遠を旅する者 ロストオデッセイ 千年の夢; Towa wo Tabisuru Mono Rosuto Odissei Sennen no Yume	2007; 2010	Kodansha Kodansha Bunko
ブランケット・キャッツ; Buranketto Kyattsu; The Blanket Cats	2008; 2011; 2024	Asahi Shimbun Publications Inc. Asahi Bunko; MacLehose Press
"Kisetsu Fū" Series; 1. ツバメ記念日 季節風・春; Tsubame Kinenbi Kisetsu Fū - Spring: 2. 僕たちのミシシッピ・リバー 季節風・夏; Bokutachi no Mishishippi-Ribā Kisetsu Fū - Summer; 3. 少しだけ欠けた月 季節風・秋; Sukoshi Dake Kaketa Tsuki Kisetsu Fū - Autumn; 4. サンタ・エクスプレス 季節風・冬; Sanda-Ekusuburesu Kisetsu Fū - Winter	2009; 2010 2008; 2011 2008; 2011 2008; 2010	Bungeishunjū; Bunshun Bunko Bungeishunjū; Bunshun Bunko Bungeishunjū; Bunshun Bunko; Bungeishunjū; Bunshun Bunko
ブルーベリー; Burū Berī; Retitled:鉄のライオン; Tetsu no Raion	2008 2011	Kobunsha Kobunsha Bunko
気をつけ、礼。 Ki wo Tsuke, Rei. Retitled:せんせい。 Sensei.	2008 2011	Shinchosha Shincho Bunko
みぞれ; Mizore	2008	Kadokawa Bunko
とんび; Tonbi	2008; 2011; 2015	Kadokawa Shoten; Kadokawa Bunko; Large Print Edition
希望ヶ丘の人びと; Kibōgaoka no Hitobito	2009; 2011	Shogakukan; Shogakukan Bunko
ステップ; Suteppu	2009; 2012	Chuokoron-Shinsha; Chuko Bunko
かあちゃん; Kāchan	2009; 2012	Kodansha Kodansha Bunko
あの歌がきこえる; Ano Uta ga Kikoeru	2009	Shincho Bunko
青春夜明け前; Seishun Yoake Mae	2009	Kodansha Bunko
再開; Saikai ロング・ロング・アゴー; Rongu-Rongu-Agō	2009 2012	Shinchosha Shincho Bunko
十字架; Jyūjika	2009; 2012	Kodansha; Kodansha Bunko

2010s

Title	Year	Publisher
きみ去りしのち; Kimi Sarishi Nochi	2010; 2013	Bungeishunjū; Bunshun Bunko
あすなろ三三七拍子; Asunaro San San Nana Hyōshi	2009; 2012	The Mainichi Newspapers Co., Ltd. Kodansha Bunko
ポニーテール; Ponī Tēru	2011; 2014	Shinchosha; Shincho Bunko
峠うどん物語; Tōge Udon Monogatari	2011; 2014	Kodansha; Kodansha Bunko
希望の地図 3.11から始まる物語; Kibō no Chizu 3.11 kara Hajimaru Monogatari	2012; 2015	Gentosha Literary Publication; Gentosha Bunko
空より高く; Sora yori Takaku	2012	Chuokoron-Shinsha
また次の春へ; Mata Tsugi no Haru e	2013	Fusosha Publishing
きみの町で; Kimi no Machi de	2013	Asahi Shimbun Publications Inc.
星のかけら; Hoshi no Kakera	2013	Shincho Bunko
ファミレス; Famiresu	2013	Nikkei Publishing Inc.
みんなのうた; Minna no Uta	2013	Kadokawa Bunko
ゼツメツ少年; Zetsumetsu Shōnen	2013	Shinchosha
赤ヘル1975; Aka Heru 1975	2013	Kodansha
一人っ子同盟; Hitorikko Dōmei	2014	Shinchosha
なきむし姫; Nakimushi Hime	2015	Shincho Bunko
