= Sonoko Machida =

Japanese writer (born 1980)

- 町田そのこ
- Born: March 9, 1980 (age 46); Miyako District, Fukuoka, Japan
- Education: Kitakyushu Municipal Barber and Beauty School
- Occupation: Writer
- Writing career
- Genre: Fiction
- Notable works: Cameroon no Aoi Sakana; 52 Hertz no Kujiratachi
- Notable awards: R-18 Literary Award; Japan Booksellers' Award

Sonoko Machida (町田 そのこ, Machida Sonoko; born March 9, 1980) is a Japanese writer. Her story Cameroon no Aoi Sakana received the R-18 Literary Award in 2016. Her novel 52 Hertz no Kujiratachi won the 2021 Japan Booksellers' Award Grand Prize and sold over 400,000 copies in Japan.

== Early life and education ==
Machida was born on March 9, 1980, in Miyako District, Fukuoka. She wanted to be a writer from an early age, but instead trained in hairdressing at the Kitakyushu Municipal Barber and Beauty School, then worked at a barbershop and a sweets shop after graduation.

She married and began raising children, but after the death of a writer she admired, she decided to try writing a novel at the age of 28. At first she tried writing a cell phone novel. According to Machida, she rediscovered her independent personality through writing, and she divorced her husband to raise her children alone. After her cell phone novel efforts were unsuccessful, a friend convinced her to try writing literary short stories, and she began to submit stories to literary prize competitions that accepted online submissions.

== Career ==
Machida submitted her work for the 2016 R-18 Literary Award, which is an annual juried prize for a story about a woman written by a woman. Jurors Shion Miura and Mizuki Tsujimura both selected Machida's Cameroon no Aoi Sakura (lit. The Blue Fish of Cameroon) as the grand prize winner. The story was included in her first book, a collection of short stories that was published by Shinchosha in 2017 under the title Yozora ni Oyogu Chokorēto Guramī (lit. Chocolate Grammies Swimming in the Night Sky). For the next few years, she wrote approximately one novel per year, including Gyoran, Utsukushigaoka no Fukō no Ie, and Konbini Kyōdai.

In 2021 her novel 52 Hertz no Kujiratachi (lit. 52 Hertz Whales), a story about two troubled and isolated people who become friends that can communicate with each other despite their difficulties, won the Japan Booksellers' Award Grand Prize. The title of the story refers to a whale in the Pacific Ocean that calls at a frequency that other whales cannot detect. Writing for Da Vinci, reviewer Yuki Mita observed that the core lesson of the book was positive despite the difficult situations faced by the characters, and that the book provided encouragement for people to keep trying to communicate until they find someone they can talk to. In Real Sound, reviewer Ichishi Iida noted that the book had become a bestseller, and suggested that the story showed how Japanese society needed something like religion or another similar social force to generate and sustain relationships between people when other bonds fail. The book sold over 400,000 copies.

Machida followed 52 Hertz Whales with her 2021 novel Hoshi o Sukuu (lit. Scoop Out the Stars), which she wrote to explore the concept of "parent gacha", the idea that one's fate is determined by one's family circumstances. As reviewer Yayoi Saginomiya wrote in a review for the Asahi Shimbun, the story, about a woman who escapes domestic violence and reunites with her long-estranged mother, communicated a strong message about "taking responsibility for your own life". Machida's 2022 novel Sora Gohan continued the theme of mothers and daughters, following the story of a child named Sora whose relationships with other parental figures complicate her relationship with her birth mother. For reviewer Asayo Takii, writing in the Sankei Shimbun, Sora Gohan is "a story of a mother and daughter growing together".

== Selected works ==
- Yozora ni Oyogu Chokorēto Guramī, Shinchosha, 2017, ISBN 9784103510819
- Gyoran, Shinchosha, 2018, ISBN 9784103510826
- Utsukushigaoka no Fukō no Ie, Tokyo Sogensha, 2019, ISBN 9784488028046
- 52 Herutsu no Kujiratachi, Chuokoron-Shinsha, 2020, ISBN 9784120052989
- Konbini Kyōdai, Shinchosha, 2020, ISBN 9784101801964
- Hoshi o Sukuu, Chuokoron-Shinsha, 2021, ISBN 9784120054730
- Sora Gohan, Shogakukan, 2022, ISBN 9784093866453
