= Hwang Boreum =

South Korean writer

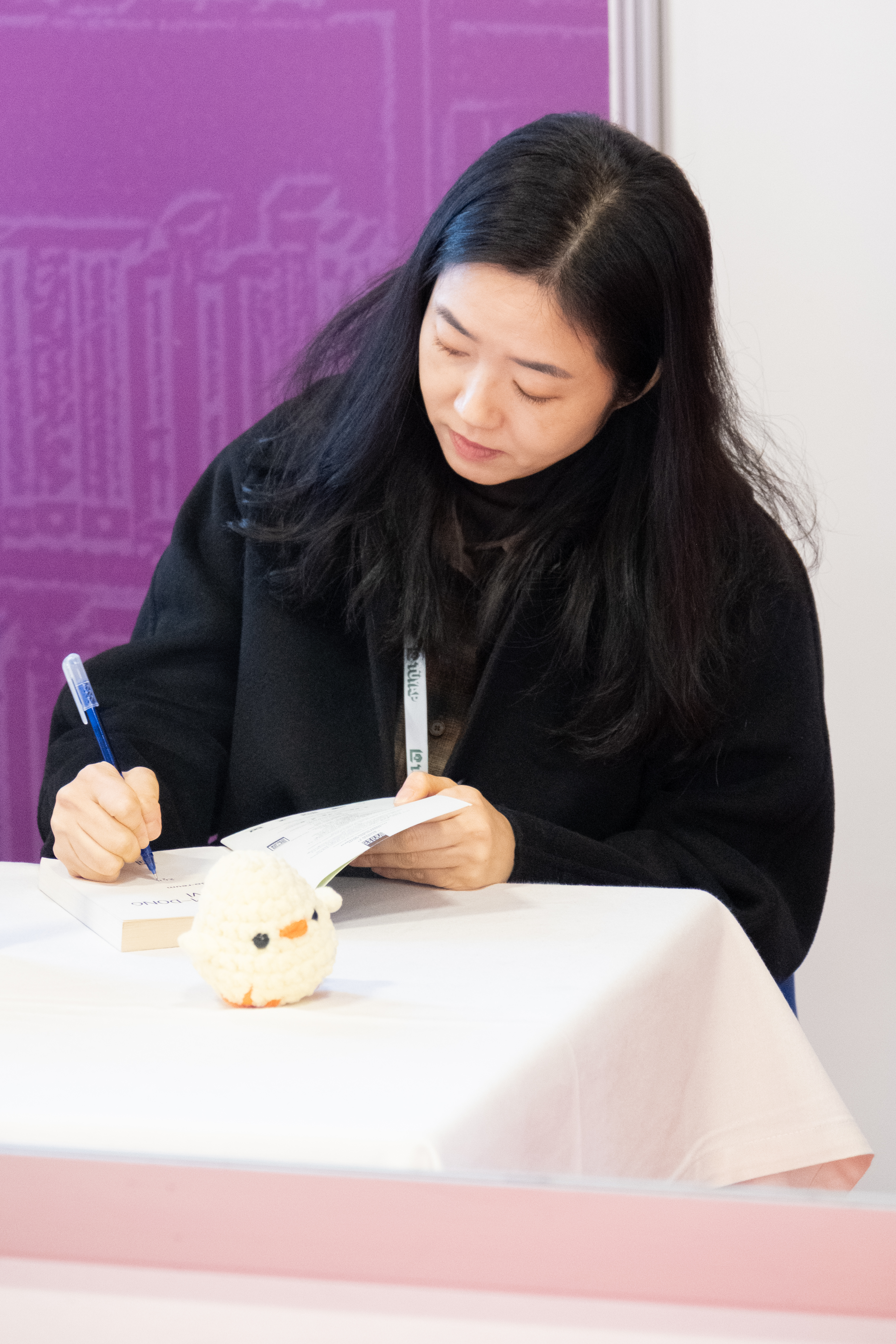
- Hwang Boreum at 42nd Istanbul Book Fair, 2025
- Occupation: Writer
- Writing career
- Genre: Fiction
- Notable work: Welcome to the Hyunam-Dong Bookshop
- Notable awards: Japan Booksellers' Award; 2024

Korean name
- Hangul: 황보름
- RR: Hwang Boreum
- MR: Hwang Porŭm

Hwang Boreum (Korean: 황보름) is a South Korean writer, whose debut novel, Welcome to the Hyunam-Dong Bookshop became an overnight hit and was translated to several languages. The book's Japanese translation won the Japan Booksellers' Award in 2024. The novel sold over 300,000 copies in South Korea.

== Life and career ==
Hwang studied computer science and worked as a software engineer at LG Electronics for several years before she decided the job was not suitable for her and quit. She started writing at the age of 30, and her first endeavours were initially rejected by publishers. After writing essay collections titled I Read Every Day, I Tried Kickboxing for the First Time and This Distance is Perfect, she decided to write a novel. She wrote Welcome to the Hyunam-Dong Bookshop in three months and uploaded it to a literary platform called Brunch (브런치). When the platform organized a contest, she submitted her novel and won. The English translation of the novel was sold to 25 countries for further translation. The book is often classified as a "healing novel" or "feel good novel".

== Works ==
- 매일 읽겠습니다 (Maeil ilgkesseumnida, 2017)
- 이 정도 거리가 딱 좋다 (I jeongdo georiga ddak johda, 2020)
- 난생처음 킥복싱 (Nansaengcheoeum kikboksing, 2020)
- 어서 오세요, 휴남동 서점입니다 (Eoseo oseyo, Hyunamdong seojeobimnida, 2022)
  - Welcome to the Hyunam-dong Bookshop. Translated by Shanna Tan. Bloomsbury Publishing. 2024. ISBN 978-1639732425.
- 단순 생활자 (Dansun saenghwalja, 2023)
