= The Accidental Further Adventures of the Hundred-Year-Old Man =

2018 comic novel written by Jonas Jonasson

First edition (publ. Piratförlaget)

The Accidental Further Adventures of the Hundred-Year-Old Man is a 2018 comic novel written by Jonas Jonasson. It is the sequel to the 2009 novel, The Hundred-Year-Old Man Who Climbed Out the Window and Disappeared. The story follows Allan Karlsson's further adventures in the present world.

== Plot ==
After the events of the previous book, Allan Karlsson and his friend Julius Johnsson are enjoying a luxurious life at a hotel in Bali, Indonesia, using the money they got from the previous book. During their stay, Julius meets an exile Indian Simran Aryabhat Chakarty Copaldas (he later renames himself Gustav Svensson) and together they decide to set up an asparagus farm and sell them as Swedish. Meanwhile Allan got himself a tablet (iPad) and entertained himself by reading the news. However, Julius, over time, realizes that the money they have is running out and they may be unable to pay the upcoming hotel bills. Nevertheless, they both decide to celebrate Allan's 101st birthday before settling their finances.

However, at the birthday celebration, Julius and Allan accidentally set off in a hot-air balloon (Julius was playing around with the controls) hired for the celebration. The two crash into the Indian Ocean and are picked up by a North Korean ship which is transporting four-kilograms of uranium to North Korea. As the North Korean captain is unwilling to call anywhere from the ship lest they be exposed, the two are to be brought to North Korea or thrown overboard instead. Hence, Allan decides to pose as a nuclear weapons expert and claims he can enrich the uranium. Aboard ship the two proceed on to North Korea, despite actually being unable to produce a nuclear bomb.

In North Korea, Allan meets Kim Jong Un himself, and later the Swedish UN ambassador Margot Wallström who is there for unofficial secret peace talks with Kim. What Wallström doesn’t expect is a Kim organized press conference on the Korean Central News Agency, announcing Allan as a nuclear weapons expert (and as Swiss by mistake rather than Swede) helping North Korea and also praising the neutral nations for helping promote peace with North Korea unlike Japan, South Korea or the United States. Seeing that Allan and Julius are just charlatans with no intentions of helping, she starts making plans to help the both of them to escape. Meanwhile, Allan decides to buy as much time as possible, and starts planning to escape from North Korea, along with the briefcase of uranium that has already been transported there. Allan manages to outwit the North Korean engineer by supplying him with formulae to work through to keep him distracted and makes a mess of the car so the North Korean driver transporting the two will have to leave, letting Allan take over the car. Eventually, Allan and Julius manage to reach the airport and check in with the help of Wallström. Meanwhile the engineer and the driver have both committed suicide, while Kim, after discovering their escape, demands Russia's help in tracking down Allan to kill him.

The two, along with Wallström, fly to New York City to the UN headquarters located there. Allan and Wallström meet the president of the United States, Donald Trump, who is not in a good mood that day. Although Allan made a good impression during an initial meeting with him, Allan unintentionally insults Trump when he is playing golf later, commenting on his golfing skills. After seeing Trump lose his temper, he decides against giving Trump the uranium. Allan catches up with Julius, and they both meet UN ambassador for Germany Konrad Breitner, and they have a nice conversation over dinner. Allan then proposes handing over the uranium to German Chancellor Angela Merkel, which the ambassador is happy to do. Allan then writes a note to Merkel to explain; then Allan and Julius leave for Sweden.

Back in Stockholm, Sweden, Allan and Julius spend what they have left on two beers. Left with no choice, they decide to meet up with Julius' friend, who has actually been arrested. As Julius has a bad blister, the two are looking for help and approach a shop run by a lady, Sabine Johnsson, who decides to give them some bandages after some convincing. Sabina laments that business at both her Séance shop and nearby coffin shop isn't going well, she still agrees to let the two stay in the coffin shop. With the help of Allan and Julius, her coffin business booms, but the upswing is cut short when there is a mix-up of coffins: a nicely-decorated coffin is sent to a group of neo-Nazis instead of a swastika, pro-nazi-decorated coffin. The neo-Nazi Johnny Engvall, being humiliated, decides to search for the group and opens fire on the coffin shop, but, Sabina, Allan and Julius manage to escape in a nearby hearse.

During their escape, they stop by a pension house. This is where Sabine and Julius decide to go back to clairvoyance and they try it on the pension manager. When she faints, the trio decides to move on to Malmö.
