= Kim Liggett =

American author

- Born: December 23, 1970 (age 55) Kansas
- Notable awards: Bram Stoker Award for Best Young Adult Novel (2017)
- Spouse: Ken Peplowski

Website
- kimliggett.com

Kim Liggett is an American author of young adult fiction.

== Early life ==
Liggett is originally from Kansas. As a teenager, she moved to New York City, where she later studied at the American Academy of Dramatic Arts.

== Career ==
Liggett's first work, the young adult horror novel Blood and Salt, was published in 2015 by Penguin Random House. A sequel, Heart of Ash, was published in 2018.

Liggett's young adult horror novel The Last Harvest won the 2017 Bram Stoker Award for Best Young Adult Novel.

Liggett's 2019 young adult dystopian novel The Grace Year is set to receive a film adaptation by Universal Pictures.

== Personal life ==
Liggett is married to jazz musician Ken Peplowski. They have two daughters. Liggett resides in Paris.

== Bibliography ==
=== Young adult fiction ===
- The Last Harvest (2017; Teen/Macmillan) – ISBN 978-0-7653-8098-2
- The Unfortunates (2018; Teen/Macmillan) – ISBN 978-0-7653-8100-2
- The Grace Year (2019; St. Martin's Press) – ISBN 978-1-250-14544-4

==== Blood and Salt series ====
1. Blood and Salt (2015; Putnam/Penguin Random House) – ISBN 978-0-399-16648-8
2. Heart of Ash (2018; Putnam/Penguin Random House) – ISBN 978-0-399-16649-5
