= The People of Paper =

Novel by Salvador Plascencia

- First edition cover
- Author: Salvador Plascencia
- Language: English
- Genre: Novel
- Publisher: McSweeney's Books, Mariner Books
- Publication date: June 2005 (McSweeney's), November 13, 2006 (Mariner)
- Publication place: United States
- Media type: Print (Hardback & Paperback)
- Pages: 256
- ISBN: 1-932416-21-8 (McSweeney's, hardback), ISBN 978-0-15-603211-7 (Mariner, paperback)
- OCLC: 60654785

The People of Paper is the debut novel of Salvador Plascencia. It was first published as a part of the Rectangulars line of McSweeney's Books.

The novel was republished in paperback by Mariner Books in 2006.

== Overview ==
The central events depicted in the novel are variously described as a war against Saturn, against sadness, and against omniscient narration. The leader of this war is Federico de la Fe, a Mexican man who is abandoned by his wife Merced due to his chronic bed-wetting. As a result of his remorse, he falls into a depression which he cures through "burn-collecting," or burning parts of his body. After leaving Mexico for the United States, Federico de la Fe and his daughter Little Merced settle in the small, flower-growing town of El Monte. There, Federico de la Fe enlists the help of the town and a local gang of flower-pickers, who call themselves the El Monte Flores, in order to combat the influence of Saturn.

== Plot ==
=== Prologue ===
The prologue tells the story of the creation of the character later known as Merced de Papel, a woman made of paper by Antonio, a former monk who had been famed for his abilities as an origami surgeon, meaning that he performed successful organ transplants using organs made of folded paper. But as medical technology surpassed his skills, he started creating origami animals and, eventually, the origami woman. Merced has "cardboard legs, cellophane appendix, and paper breasts".

=== I: El Monte Flores ===
The main storyline of the first seven chapters is the origin of the "war on Saturn" by Federico de la Fe and his group, El Monte Flores (a.k.a. EMF). Having lost his wife due to his bedwetting, Federico de la Fe takes his young daughter Little Merced from their Mexican town near the Las Tortugas river and moves from Mexico to El Monte, California, where he works with the EMF (then a gang) picking carnations for a living. While moving through Mexico to the USA, Federico de la Fe begins to feel that he is being watched by Saturn, and he discovers that only lead can shield him from the omnipresent view of the planet. He convinces the EMF to help him wage this war, which they do first by setting fires around town so that Saturn cannot see through, and second by having lead walls and ceilings put into all their houses. At the end of the section, "Saturn was unhinging from its orbit and slowly moving deeper into the solar system, away from the roofs of El Monte, eventually becoming the farthest planet [sic] from the sun...."

The section is told mostly from the perspectives of Saturn, Federico de la Fe, and Little Merced, but other EMF characters contribute, such as Froggy El Veterano, Federico de la Fe's right-hand man; Sandra, a subcomandante and a woman who was Froggy's lover until Froggy killed her abusive father; and Julieta, a woman whose town in Mexico had self-destructed and who becomes Froggy's lover after Sandra. Non-EMF characters who get sections to themselves include Rita Hayworth (known as "Margarita"); Merced de Papel, who receives her name from Little Merced; Ignacio, the mechanic who provides the lead shields; Apolonio, a curandero who helps Froggy overcome his sadness at losing Sandra; Santos, a saint who has been hiding from the church by living as a popular luchador; and Baby Nostradamus, an infant whose mother tells fortunes.

=== II: Cloudy skies and lonely mornings ===
At the beginning of this section, it is revealed that the character/narrator Saturn is a pseudonym for author Salvador Plascencia, and that he has given up on the novel after his girlfriend Liz leaves him for another man due to his obsessive war with Federico de la Fe and the EMF (a loose parallel to Merced leaving Federico). Much of this section looks at the Saturn/Plascencia's personal life, including his attempts to communicate with Liz and his later relationship with Cameroon, a woman who gives herself bee-stings (much like Federico de la Fe burns himself). The chapter also discusses Saturn/Plascencia's great-grandfather Don Victoriano, who is described as also being the ancestor of the people of Las Tortugas and of Antonio the origami surgeon. Other characters include Cameroon's long-lost father, Jonathan Mead, who is nervously preparing to call her for the first time in years; hoteliers Natalia and Quinones Hernandez, who run a honeymooners-only hotel that Saturn/Plascencia and Cameroon fraudulently check into; and Ralph and Elisa Landin, who are financially supporting the writing of the novel, even though Saturn/Plascencia uses much of the money for non-authorial expenses.

The section ends with two chapters related to Cameroon and Liz: first, it is revealed that Cameroon has since left Saturn/Plascencia because of his many lies, such as falsifying Rita Hayworth's biography; second, Liz writes a chapter pointing out that the novel is a public discourse and therefore an unfair site for Saturn/Plascencia to take out his anger on her, such as by using the false biography of Rita Hayworth as a metaphor for their failed relationship. She also notes that he has now unfairly brought several other people from his life into the story, including his great-grandfather Don Victoriano and Cameroon. She pleads with him, "if you still love me, please leave me out of this story. Start this book over, without me." After this the title page and first dedication page reappear, but not the dedication page for Liz, an absence that suggests the book will start over without reference to Liz. Then the third section begins.

=== III: The sky is falling ===
The third book begins with Saturn briefly silent, but eventually returning to his watching over El Monte. Meanwhile, the EMF members have realized that the lead shielding is making them all sick; with the help of Apolonio the curandero, they regain their health and tear down all the lead. Little Merced learns from Baby Nostradamus the secret of how to block her thoughts from Saturn and, eventually, how to extend that block to everyone else; however, she is killed by citrus poisoning and remains dead for five days, until Apolonio finds a way to resurrect her; revived, she has to relearn how to shield thoughts. Federico de la Fe and Froggy realize that a better way to fight Saturn is not to shield their thoughts but to think and speak openly, thus literally crowding Saturn to the margins with their own words; at this section, the pages become crowded with characters narrating, and Saturn's passages shrink to just a corner of the page. Eventually, the sky above the town starts to crumble, and the EMF think they have succeeded. Apolonio's becomes caretaker for the orphaned Baby Nostradamus, his shop is raided by the church, and he is officially excommunicated from the Church. And Merced de Papel is killed in a car accident.

In Plascencia's world, Cameroon discovers to her horror that other people already know her because of Plascencia's book, in which she died and was buried in the ocean to be food for the fish. Her father does not find her, but he does explain why he abandoned her when she was a child. The Landins discover that Plascencia has been misusing their money, and they withdraw their support. Plascencia continues to try to contact Liz, who replies that what she did was not as bad as Plascencia has made it; with this, Plascencia starts to let go of his anger and returns his gaze to the town of El Monte. Watching over the townspeople, he eventually comes to Baby Nostradamus, through whom Plascencia sees a future for all the characters, including one in which Liz, still married to the man she left Plascencia for, thinks fondly of Saturn/Plascencia. While Plascencia/Saturn again drifts into a fantasy of what their life would have been like, Little Merced helps Federico de la Fe to leave El Monte and to walk "off the page, leaving no footprints that Saturn could track".

== Structure and style ==
In form the novel owes a debt to a wide variety of experimental fiction from the magical realism of Latin American writers, to the Beat writings of William S. Burroughs, to American postmodernists, particularly in its turn towards metafiction. The book is notable for its unique layout, featuring in-line illustrations, columns of text running in different directions across the page, blacked out sections, and sections that have literally been cut out of the novel. The suggestion that parts of the page be punched out with a diecut was made by Eli Horowitz, the editor at McSweeney's who accepted the manuscript. The unusual multi-column structure of the page was inspired by similar departures from standard formatting made by authors like Cris Mazza, John Edgar Wideman and Denise Chávez.

The novel's setting in Plascencia's hometown of El Monte is inextricably tied to the narrative's themes of transnationalism. The narrative also deals with themes of racial violence and anti-immigration policies.

== Reception ==
The novel was received as an innovative contribution to avant-garde literature, containing threads of postcolonial theory and Chicana feminism. 3:AM Magazine's Susan Tomaselli described it as "part Swiftian, part Borgesian, entences full of Garcia Marquez and Kafka and with more than the occasional nod to Italo Calvino".

Publishers Weekly deemed the book "virtuosic" and described it as "a mischievous mix of García Márquez magical realism and Tristram Shandy typographical tricks". Critique's Graham K. Riach considered the novel's layout innovative and that it invoked "an intertextual history of such innovation".

KQED compared the novel to García Márquez's literary output but wrote that it was at times "so over the top that the emotional core of the story is sidelined". The Guardian's Steven Poole felt that the book had interesting ideas but an uneven rhythm and uninspired prose.
