= Ito Ogawa =

Japanese writer

Ito Ogawa (小川 糸, Ogawa Ito) is a Japanese novelist, lyricist and translator. She was born in 1973 in Yamagata, Yamagata.

Several of her books have gained international recognition, such as The Restaurant of Love Regained (2008; Japanese Title: 食堂かたつむり - Shokudō Katatsumuri), described as a "foodie fable", which was made into a film in 2010 under the title "Shokudo Katatsumuri" ("Rinco's Restaurant").

== Publications ==
- The Restaurant of Love Regained, 2008
- Tsurukame josan'in, 2010
- Atsuatsu o meshiagare, 2011
- Le ruban roman, 2014
- La papeterie Tsubaki : roman, 2016
- Le jardin arc-en-ciel : roman, 2016
- La locanda degli amori diversi, 2016
- Kirakira Kyōwakoku, 2017
- Lion no Oyatsu, 2019 (ISBN 9784591160022)
- Towa no Niwa, 2020 (ISBN 9784101383439)
