= Toshikazu Kawaguchi =

Japanese Author

- 川口 俊和
- Born: 3 April 1971 (age 55); Osaka
- Occupations: Author, playwright, director
- Known for: Novels and plays
- Notable work: Before the Coffee Gets Cold

Toshikazu Kawaguchi (川口 俊和; born 3 April 1971) is a Japanese author, screenwriter, and director born in Osaka, Japan. He has received the Grand Prize of the Suginami Theatre Festival for his stage version of Before the Coffee Gets Cold as well as having been nominated for the Bookseller's Award for the novel version. The novel has been translated into 46 languages, selling over six million copies. He has produced, directed, and wrote for theatrical group Sonic Snail. His works explore themes of love, loss, grief, and kindness.

== Early life ==
Kawaguchi was born in Osaka, Japan. His father, who ran a barbershop with his mother, died at the age of 38, when he was 12 years old. In an interview with Centrului de Studii Româno-Japoneze in 2025, he stated that he was not very interested in reading when he was a child, but started reading novels when he was 19, inspired by historical fiction writer Tobe Shinjūrō. Kawaguchi says that early in his career, he didn’t have a lot of money, surviving on 200 yen a week.

He first tried to make a living writing manga, before writing plays and eventually adapting one of them, Before the Coffee Gets Cold, into a novel.

== Works ==
=== Plays ===
- COUPLE
- Sunset Song
- Family Time
- Before the Coffee Gets Cold

=== Novels ===
==== Before the Coffee Gets Cold Series ====
- Before the Coffee Gets Cold (December 2015, Sunmark Publishing, ISBN 978-4-7631-3507-0 C0093)
- Tales from the Café (March 2017, Sunmark Publishing, ISBN 978-4-7631-3607-7 C0093)
- Before Your Memory Fades (September 2018, Sunmark Publishing, ISBN 978-4-7631-3720-3 C0093)
- Before We Say Goodbye (September 2021, Sunmark Publishing, ISBN 978-4-7631-3937-5 C0093)
- Before We Forget Kindness (March 2023, Sunmark Publishing, ISBN 978-4-7631-4039-5 C0093)
- Before I Knew I Loved You (September 2024, Sunmark Publishing, ISBN 978-4-7631-4104-0 C0093)

== Awards ==
He has received the 10th Grand Prize of the Suginami Theatre Festival for his stage version of Before the Coffee Gets Cold and his own novel adaptation received a nomination for the Bookseller's Award.
