= Jonas Jonasson =

Swedish journalist and writer (born 1961)

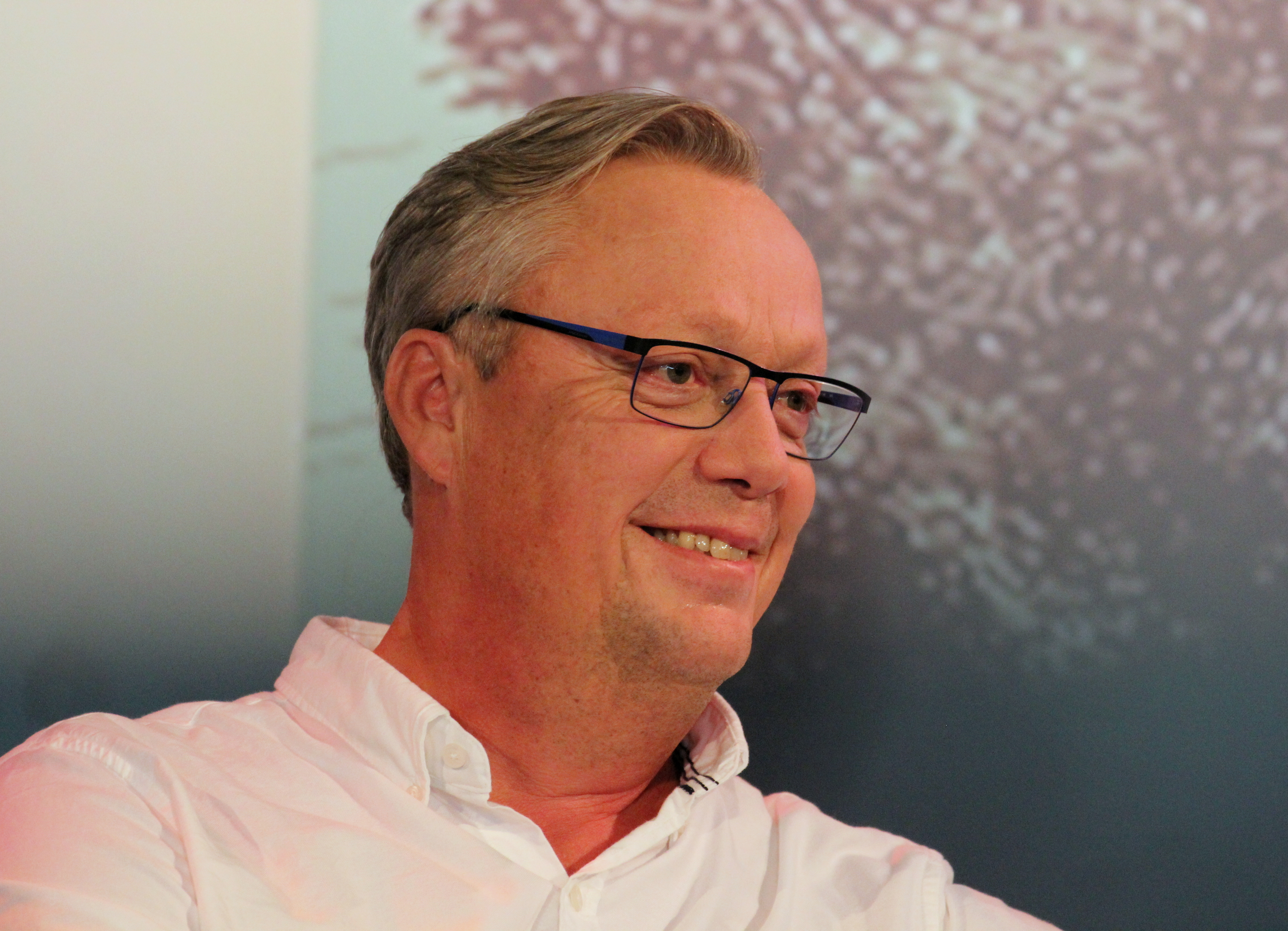
- Jonas Jonasson
- Born: Per Ola Jonasson; 6 July 1961 (age 65); Växjö, Sweden
- Occupations: Journalist, writer
- Writing career
- Notable work: The Hundred-Year-Old Man Who Climbed Out the Window and Disappeared

Pär-Ola Jonas Jonasson (born Per Ola Jonasson; 6 July 1961) is a Swedish journalist and writer, best known as the author of the best-seller The Hundred-Year-Old Man Who Climbed Out the Window and Disappeared.

== Biography ==
The son of an ambulance driver and a nurse, Jonasson was born and raised in Växjö in southern Sweden.After studying Swedish and Spanish at the University of Gothenburg, Jonasson worked as a journalist for the Växjö newspaper Smålandsposten and for the Swedish evening tabloid Expressen, where he remained until 1994. In 1996, he founded a media company, OTW, which grew to 100 employees. He stopped working in 2003, after having two major back operations. He later sold his company.

In 2007, he completed his first book, The Hundred-Year-Old Man Who Climbed Out the Window and Disappeared. It was published in Sweden in 2009. Since 2010, Jonasson has been living with his son on the Swedish island of Gotland.

== Awards ==
- Mayersche Buchhandlung M-Pionier Preis (2011)
- DR Lydbogsprisen (2011)

== Works ==
Jonasson's first novel, The Hundred-Year-Old Man Who Climbed Out of the Window and Disappeared, achieved worldwide success. Telling the adventures of a centenarian who escapes from a care home, it has been translated into 35 languages, selling over a million copies in Germany and over 2.5 million worldwide as of 2012.

Jonasson's second novel,The Girl Who Saved the King of Sweden, is about an orphan from Soweto who by chance becomes involved in international politics. It was released in September 2013.

Jonasson's third novel, Hitman Anders and the Meaning of It All, begins with a chance meeting between a hotel desk clerk, a released prisoner and a former priest. It was released on 23 September 2015.

Jonasson's fourth novel, The Accidental Further Adventures of the Hundred-Year-Old Man, was published in 2018.

Jonasson's fifth novel, Sweet Sweet Revenge Ltd., was published in 2020.

Jonasson's sixth novel, The Prophet and the Idiot, was published in 2022.
