= Chikuma Shobō =

Japanese book publisher headquartered in Tokyo

Chikumashobo
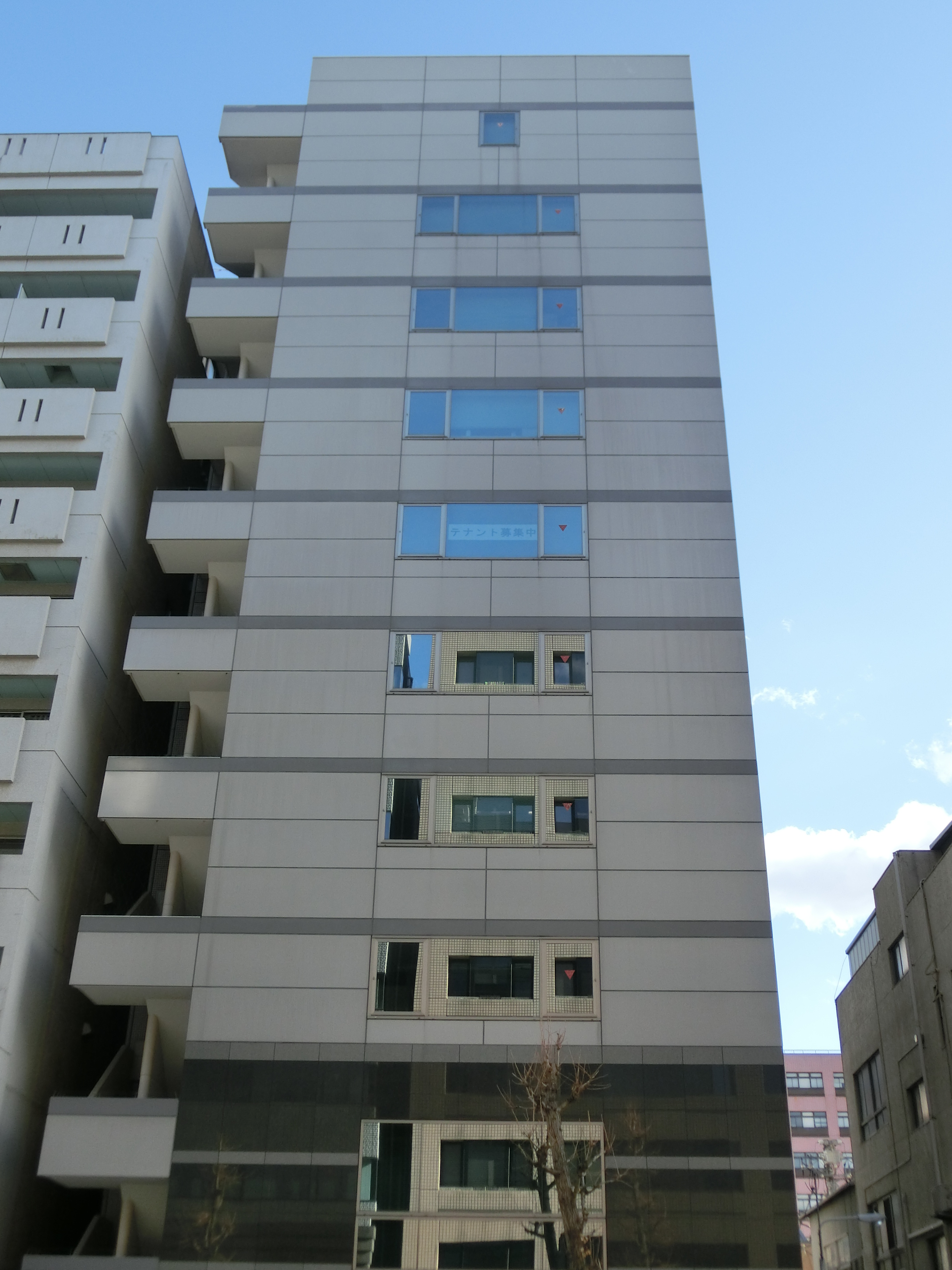
- Headquarters in Taitō, Tokyō, Japan
- Native name: 株式会社筑摩書房
- Type: Private (K.K.)
- Founded: 18 June 1940
- Headquarters: Kuramae

Chikumashobo Ltd. (株式会社筑摩書房, Kabushiki Kaisha Chikuma Shobō) is a Japanese book publisher headquartered in Kuramae, Taitō, Tokyo.

Founded in 1940 by Furuta Akira (1906–1973) in cooperation with the writer and critic Yoshimi Usui, it first published the intellectual monthly Tembo (Views) in 1946.

In 1953 Usui planned and edited the first edition of the Gendai Nihon bungaku zenshu (Collected Works of Modern Japanese Literature). Originally issued as 55 volumes and later increased to 99 volumes, this undertaking provided "a model for later collections of literature by Japanese authors".

The firm co-sponsors the Dazai Osamu Prize with the city of Mitaka, Tokyo. The prize is awarded annually to an outstanding, previously unpublished short story by an unrecognized author; the winner receives a commemorative gift and a cash award of 1 million yen.

== Book series ==
- Chikuma Bunko (English, "Chikuma Library")
- Chikuma Gakugei Bunko
- Chikuma Shinsho (English, "Chikuma New Book [i.e. trade paperback]")
- Chikuma Purima Shinsho (English, "Chikuma Primer New Book [i.e. trade paperback]")
- Chikuma Sensho (English, "Chikuma Book Selection")
- Chikuma Nihon Bungaku Zenshu (English, "Chikuma Complete Works of Japanese Literature")
- Chikuma Nihon Bungaku (English, "Chikuma Japanese Literature")
- Chikuma Hyoden Shirizu (porutore) (English, "Chikuma Criticism Series")

=== Former book series ===
- Chikuma Sosho (English, "Chikuma Monographs")
- Chikuma Purima Bukkusu (English, "Chikuma Primer Books")
- Chikuma Raiburari (English, "Chikuma Library")
- Gendai Nihon Bungaku Zenshu (English, "Collected Works of Modern Japanese Literature")
