= Before the Coffee Gets Cold =

2015 Japanese novel by Toshikazu Kawaguchi

- Author: Toshikazu Kawaguchi (川口 俊和)
- Original title: コーヒーが冷めないうちに
- Language: Japanese
- Genre: novel
- Publisher: Sunmark Publishing
- Publication date: 6 December 2015
- Pages: 348
- ISBN: 978-4-7631-3507-0
- Followed by: Tales from the Cafe

Before the Coffee Gets Cold (コーヒーが冷めないうちに, Kohi ga Samenai Uchi ni) is a 2015 novel by Toshikazu Kawaguchi. It tells the story of a café in Tokyo that allows its customers to travel back in time, as long as they return before their coffee gets cold.

The story originally began as a play in 2010, before being adapted into a novel in 2015. It was translated into English by Geoffrey Trousselot and published in Britain by Picador in September 2019.

== Plot summary ==
In a narrow back alley in Tokyo lies a café called Funiculi Funicula. In the café, customers have the opportunity to travel to a time of their choosing, as long as they follow a long list of rules. There is only one seat in the café that allows time travel; the seat is only available when the ghost that usually occupies it goes for a toilet break; once back in time, customers can't leave the seat; the only people in the past who can be met are people who have visited the café; whatever happens in the past, the present won't change; and, most importantly, the customer has to return to the present before their cup of coffee goes cold (around an hour).

The novel follows the stories of the café staff, notably the barista Kazu, and four different customers. The first customer is a businesswoman named Fumiko who tries to repair her relationship with her boyfriend after he left the country for a job in the United States. The second customer, a nurse named Kohtake, tries to find a letter that her Alzheimer-stricken husband wrote. The third customer is a bar owner named Hirai, who tries to initiate a conversation with her sister whom she's been avoiding. The fourth customer is Kei, one of the café co-owners, who tries to go to the future to talk to her unborn daughter. Through the stories of its four characters, the author delivers a compelling message: the past cannot be altered, but the future remains open and full of possibilities.

== Reception ==
Terry Hong of The Christian Science Monitor stated that the "narrative is occasionally uneven and tends to meander" but that the author "has a surprising, unerring ability to find lasting emotional resonance." Ian J. Battaglia of the Chicago Review of Books wrote that "despite the occasional clumsiness, the narrative is deeply moving" and that the "characters are the real stars here, and their empathy for one another is powerful." Courtney Rodgers of Book Riot compared the book to American comedy series Pushing Daisies, stating that the "charming short novel asks questions about time and how we choose to spend it."

Joseph P. Kelly of The Harvard Crimson gave the book five stars.

== Sequels ==
In 2017, a sequel was released in Japan: Before the Coffee Gets Cold: Tales from the Cafe. A second sequel, Before Your Memory Fades, was published in 2018 and the third one, called Before We Say Goodbye, followed in 2021. The fourth sequel was published in Japanese in 2023, and its English translation was published in September 2024 as Before We Forget Kindness. The fifth, Before I Knew I Loved You, was published in May 2026.

== Adaptations ==
In 2018, the novel was adapted into the film Cafe Funiculi Funicula, starring Kasumi Arimura.

In October 2021, it was announced that SK Global and The Jackal Group to develop, finance, and produce an adaptation of the novel as a television series at Fox
