= The Hundred-Year-Old Man Who Climbed Out the Window and Disappeared (novel) =

2009 comic novel by Jonas Jonasson

- The cover of the Swedish original version of the book.
- Author: Jonas Jonasson
- Audio read by: Peter Kenny (English)
- Original title: Hundraåringen som klev ut genom fönstret och försvann
- Translator: Rod Bradbury
- Cover artist: Eric Thunfors
- Language: Swedish
- Publisher: Piratförlaget, Hyperion Books
- Publication date: 9 September 2009
- Publication place: Sweden
- English publication date: 12 July 2012
- Pages: 391 pages
- ISBN: 978-91-642-0296-3
- OCLC: 778416495
- Dewey Decimal: 839.73
- LC Class: PT9877.2.O537 H8513
- Followed by: The Accidental Further Adventures of the Hundred-Year-Old Man

The Hundred-Year-Old Man Who Climbed Out the Window and Disappeared (Swedish: Hundraåringen som klev ut genom fönstret och försvann), also known as The 100-Year-Old Man Who Climbed Out the Window and Disappeared in the US, is a 2009 comic novel by the Swedish author Jonas Jonasson. The Swedish version was first published on 9 September 2009, and the English version on 12 July 2012.

In 2018, a sequel was published: The Accidental Further Adventures of the Hundred-Year-Old Man.

== Plot ==
Allan Karlsson is about to celebrate his hundredth birthday, and his retirement home in Malmköping is planning to throw a party. Allan is not interested. Instead, he climbs out the window and disappears. He walks to the bus station, where he meets a young man who rudely demands that Allan look after his suitcase. Allan's bus arrives and he boards, taking the case with him. It is full of illegal drug money, and Allan is chased by a drug gang as well as by the police. He gets involved in various criminal activities, eventually escaping when the man from the bus station is accidentally trapped in a freezer, his body ending up in a container destined for Djibouti. An elephant crushes another member of the gang, his remains being inadvertently sent to Latvia in the boot of a Ford Mustang.

In parallel with Allan's adventures as a centenarian, the novel includes flashbacks to increasingly fantastic episodes from his younger days.

As a young man, Allan had worked in a dynamite factory, his expertise taking him to Spain during the civil war, where he accidentally saves General Franco. In the United States he becomes good friends with Harry S. Truman, and helps to make the atom bomb.

After the war, Allan is sent to China to help the Kuomintang fight against the communists, but he loses interest and leaves for Sweden by foot, falling in with a group of communists; they cross the Himalayas to Iran, where Allan is arrested. As a ruse, Allan offers to help the Chief of Police in an assassination attempt against Winston Churchill.

Back in Sweden, the authorities doubt Allan's bomb-making expertise, but the Russians are interested and Yury Popov takes him to the Soviet Union to meet Stalin. Unfortunately, Stalin is offended by his having saved Franco's life, and Allan is sentenced to hard labour in a gulag in Vladivostok. There he meets Albert Einstein's fictional half brother, Herbert.

Herbert and Allan escape, setting fire to the whole of Vladivostok in the process. Travelling to North Korea during the Korean War, they pose as Soviet marshal Kirill Afanesievich Meretskov and his aide, and meet Kim Il Sung and Mao Zedong (Mao Tse-tung). Although they are quickly exposed as frauds, disaster is averted when Mao Zedong learns that Allan had saved his wife, Jiang Qing, during the Chinese Civil War. Allan and Herbert are given cash and dispatched to Bali for a long holiday. There, Herbert meets a waitress, Ni Wayan Laksmi, whom he marries and renames Amanda. She corruptly makes use of the cash and gets herself appointed as Indonesia's ambassador to France.

In 1968, Amanda, Herbert and Allan travel to France. At the Élysée Palace Amanda and Allan have lunch with Charles de Gaulle and Lyndon B. Johnson who is in Paris for talks on the Vietnam War. Allan identifies the French Interior Minister Christian Fouchet's special advisor as a Soviet spy. This pleases Johnson who makes Allan a CIA agent. Thanks to Allan's tip-off, the protests in Paris end. Allan is to be awarded a medal, but has already left for Moscow.

Allan is given cover in the American embassy, and is reunited with Popov. The pair decide to write intelligence reports to please both sides. Their reports result in Richard Nixon visiting Leonid Brezhnev, but also in both sides increasing spending on their nuclear deterrents. As the Soviet Union starts to collapse, Allan returns to Sweden.

Allan settles down to a peaceful life and adopts a cat that he names Molotov. After Molotov is killed by a fox, Allan sets a trap with dynamite, resulting in a huge explosion. Eventually, the authorities decide to send Allan to the Malmköping retirement home from where, on his hundredth birthday, he escapes.

The book concludes with the 100-year-old Allan and his comrades flying to Indonesia, where they spend time at a luxury hotel managed by Amanda and her sons. When approached by a representative of the Indonesian government, Allan agrees to help, telling himself that at least the Indonesian president, Yudhoyono, is sane – unlike the other leaders he has met in his lifetime.

== Release and reception ==
The Hundred-Year-Old Man Who Climbed Out the Window and Disappeared was released as a hardback and audiobook in 2009, and as a paperback in 2010. It became the best selling book in Sweden in 2010, and by July 2012 had sold three million copies worldwide. The audiobook, read by the actor Björn Granath, won the Iris Ljudbokspris award in 2010. The book was published in the United Kingdom by Hesperus Press on 12 July 2012 and in the United States by Hyperion Books on 11 September 2012.

In 2013, it was adapted into a film of the same name.
