= Dazai Osamu Prize =

Japanese literary award (1966–1978, 1999–)

The Dazai Osamu Prize (太宰治賞) is a Japanese literary prize named for novelist Dazai Osamu (1909–1948).

The prize was established in 1965 by the Chikuma Shobō publishing company, discontinued in 1978, and resumed again in 1999 with co-sponsorship of the Mitaka, Tokyo municipal government. It is awarded annually to an outstanding, previously unpublished short story by an unrecognized author; the winner receives a commemorative gift and a cash award of 1 million yen.

== See also ==
- List of Japanese literary awards
