= List of Japanese films of 2027 =

This is a list of Japanese films that are scheduled to release in 2027.

== Released ==
=== January – March ===
Opening		Title	Director	Cast	Ref.
J A N U A R Y	8	The High School Family	Toichiro Ruto	Shingo Katori, Riisa Naka, Jun Saitō, Yuno Nagao, Rintaro Mizusawa, Masaya Kimura, Miyu Honda, Yūka Kageyama, Anna Kurasawa, Ryotaro Sakaguchi, Kodai Fujimoto, Ryushin Ozawa, Soma Santoki, Naenano, Yuzu Ashikawa, Rin Oomasa	
J A N U A R Y	8	Sins of Kujo: The Movie	Nobuhiro Doi	Yuya Yagira, Hokuto Matsumura, Elaiza Ikeda, Keita Machida, Takuma Otoo, Tsuyoshi Muro	
J A N U A R Y	15	The Tiger and Her Wings: The Movie	Yoshiro Nagikawa	Sairi Ito, Masaki Okada, Misato Morita, Shiori Doi, Junki Tozuka, Yuki Sakurai, Kami Hiraiwa, Ha Yeon-soo, Nagi Hasegawa, Sara Minami, Riki Oshiro, Kayo Noro, Masahiro Takashima, Fukiko Hara, Yuki Uchida, Matsumoto Kōshirō X	
J A N U A R Y	15	Kasuka na Kare o Dakishimete	Tatsuya Yamanishi	Nao, Ryota Bando, Shunsuke Daito, Ayumu Nakajima	
J A N U A R Y	15	Mobile Suit Gundam SEED Freedom Zero	Mitsuo Fukuda	Kenichi Suzumura, Maaya Sakamoto, Houko Kuwashima, Daisuke Ono, Sōichirō Hoshi, Rie Tanaka, Akira Ishida, Nanako Mori, Tomokazu Seki, Akira Sasanuma, Kotono Mitsuishi, Takehito Koyasu	
J A N U A R Y	16	Diamonds in the Sand	Janus Victoria	Lily Franky, Maria Isabel Lopez, Soliman Cruz, Charlie Dizon, Stefanie Ariane as Sheila, Ikkei Watanabe, Kanji Furutachi, Ryo Iwamatsu, Reiko Kataoka, Kazuko Yoshiyuki	
J A N U A R Y	22	10 Things I Want to Do Before I Turn 40: The Movie	Chihiro Ikeda	Shunsuke Kazama, Kohei Shoji, Amon Hirai, Riko Takayama, Keisuke Watanabe, Yui Yokoyama, Sae Miyazawa, Kotono Mitsuishi, Yuki Hirako	
J A N U A R Y	22	Akiramemasen!	Akiko Ōku	Hiromi Nagasaku, Nanase Nishino, Aimi Satsukawa, Masatō Ibu, Mie Nakao, Nao Ōmori	
J A N U A R Y	29	Kaiji 4	Toya Sato	Tatsuya Fujiwara, Mahiro Takasugi, Sara Minami, Susumu Terajima, Kazuya Kamenashi	
J A N U A R Y	29	In My Father's Room	Maha Harada	Yu Aoi, Eita Nagayama, Eri Watanabe, Kami Hiraiwa, Motoki Nakazawa, Arisa Nakano, Issey Ogata	
J A N U A R Y	29	Titanic Ocean	Konstantina Kotzamani	Arisa Sasaki, Haruna Matsui, Kotone Hanase, Hanna Muro, Riku Nakamura, Aki Kigoshi, Masahiro Higashide, Sei Matobu	
F E B R U A R Y	5	All That Exists	Takahisa Zeze	Hidetoshi Nishijima, Suzu Hirose, Jun Shison, Tōru Nakamura, Takumi Saitoh, Sho Aoyagi, Ken Mitsuishi, Toshiyuki Nagashima, Eiji Okuda	
F E B R U A R Y	5	A List for Tomorrow	Bunji Sotoyama	Hiroshi Abe, Ren Nagase, Taizo Harada, Rie Tomosaka, Tomomitsu Adachi, Kaoru Okunuki, Naomasa Musaka, Saori Yuki, Renji Ishibashi	
F E B R U A R Y	5	The Intertwining	Akira Yamamoto	Erika Karata, Kang Ji-young	
F E B R U A R Y	11	Ghost	Shingo Natsume	Mayu Hotta, Issey Takahashi, Kenjiro Tsuda, Hiroki Yasumoto, Hiroshi Kamiya	
F E B R U A R Y	11	Leviathan	Michihito Fujii, Ryohei Shingu	Shunsuke Michieda, Natsuki Deguchi, Kaito Sakurai, Kairi Jo, Ryuto Sakuma, Riko, Kotone Hanase, Miku Tanaka, Yōko Shōgenji, Uta, Ai Hashimoto, Shun Oguri	
F E B R U A R Y	12	Koe yo Hirogare	Yuta Soma	Satoru Soma, Moga Mogami, Genki Iwahashi, Funyao Harada, Mayu Ozawa, Daiki Uyo, Shugo	
F E B R U A R Y	19	The Gate of Murder	Ko Kanai	Kento Yamazaki, Kouhei Matsushita, Emi Takei, Misato Morita, Miona Hori, Kousei Yuki, Noriko Eguchi, Miyoko Asada, Kōichi Satō	
F E B R U A R Y	19	Super Mob Ninja	Yugo Sakamoto	Yuki Yamada, Anna Yamada	
F E B R U A R Y	19	Medalist Movie	Yasutaka Yamamoto	Natsumi Haruse, Takeo Otsuka, Kana Ichinose, Yuma Uchida	
F E B R U A R Y	19	Gacha	Hayato Sone	Yūki Yoda, Ai Yoshikawa, Hina Kikuchi, Yoji Iwase, Tasuku Sato, Nahana, Hidekazu Mashima	
F E B R U A R Y	26	One Liter of Tears	Shosuke Murakami	Ryo Nishikido, Hidekazu Chinen, Rui Tsukishima, Ayana Kasai, Sosuke Yoshida, Mei Morobayashi, Yasuko Tomita, Ikki Sawamura	
F E B R U A R Y	26	Rice Bowl and Spoon	David Ito	Ryuta Muro, David Ito, Rina Saito, Daichi Imae, Tomoko Fujita, Akio Kaneda, Tokuma Nishioka	
F E B R U A R Y	26	Last Dance	Tōru Murakawa	Tasuku Emoto, Ryudo Uzaki, Yumi Asō, Tina Tamashiro, Yoshihiko Hakamada	
F E B R U A R Y	26	Border	Kazuyuki Izutsu	Hideaki Itō, Shota Sometani, Kotone Hanase	
F E B R U A R Y	26	Last Vacation	Ken Iizuka	Hokuto Yoshino, Ayana Shiramoto, Mijika Nagai, So Yamanaka, Maho Yamada, Tokio Emoto, Motoki Ochiai, Rika Adachi, Kimiko Yo, Kiyohiko Shibukawa, Maki Sakai	
F E B R U A R Y	26	All of the World	Kazuyoshi Kumakiri	Yōko Shōgenji, Rina Watanabe, Kaho Fujishima, Tamaki Ishizuka, Nanami Konishi, Kirari Takeuchi, Honoka Hirao, Mitsuki Hiraoka, Rio Shimizu, Sumire Miyachi, Haruka Yamashita	
M A R C H
M A R C H	5	Patlabor EZY: File 3	Yutaka Izubuchi	Sumire Uesaka, Kikunosuke Toya, Ami Koshimizu, Chikahiro Kobayashi, Setsuji Satō, Yume Matsumura, Megumi Hayashibara	
M A R C H	5	Doraemon: Nobita's Steam-Powered Time Machine	Rushio Moriyama	Wasabi Mizuta, Megumi Ohara, Yumi Kakazu, Subaru Kimura, Tomokazu Seki, Chikahiro Kobayashi, Tomoyo Kurosawa, Aoi Yūki, Kenshō Ono, Riko Fujitani	
M A R C H	5	Irresistible I Love You	Yuka Yasukawa	Kouta Nomura, Juri Kosaka, Shunta Sono	
M A R C H	5	Prism	Yuji Hariu	Kaito Takahashi, Kotaro Daigo, Takenori Goto, Yukito Hidaka	
M A R C H	12	Darwin's Game	Fumihiko Sori	Taishi Nakagawa, Kōki, Mei Hata, Fūju Kamio, Koji Yamamoto	
M A R C H	19	Mashle	Yuichi Fukuda	Mackenyu	
M A R C H	26	Enju	Shigeaki Kubo	Alice Hirose	
M A R C H	26	School Meals Time: Umasoge Kingdom	Shinya Ayabe	Hayato Ichihara, Chihiro Yamamoto, Ise Hashimoto, Hiroki Kawata, Maiko Itō, Norito Yashima, Ryosei Tayama	
M A R C H	TBA	Sleeping in the Red Earth	Masakazu Kaneko	Kisetsu Fujiwara, Sena Nakajima, Ken Yasuda, Kiyohiko Shibukawa, Asuka Kurosawa, Hatsunori Hasegawa, Kazuko Shirakawa	
M A R C H	TBA	Between Us	Shingo Matsumura	Ririka Kawashima, Anna Kurasawa, Akiko Kikuchi, Asami Usuda, Yoichiro Saito, Takahiro Miura	

=== April – June ===
Opening		Title	Director	Cast	Ref.
A P R I L	2	Mada Minu Kimi e	Santa Yamagishi	Hokuto Matsumura, Mayu Hotta	
A P R I L	29	Okinawa Confidential	Hajime Hashimoto	Eiji Akaso, Taishi Nakagawa, Kumi Takiuchi, Mizuki Kayashima, Yoshi Sakou, Kimiko Yo, Kazuki Kitamura	
A P R I L	TBA	The Real Killer	Shuhei Shibue	Kankurō Kudō, Fumiya Takahashi, Ryuhei Matsuda	
M A Y	14	Kuroneko	Tsuyoshi Inoue	Koshi Mizukami, Lilas Ikuta	
M A Y	14	Anisong Boys	Misato Kato	Kazuya Ohashi	
M A Y	21	Girls Band Cry: The Movie	Kazuo Sakai	Rina, Yuri, Mirei, Natsu, Shuri, Reina Kondo, Misato Matsuoka, Yuki Urushiyama, Momoko Miyashiro	

=== October – December ===
Opening		Title	Director	Cast	Ref.
O C T O B E R	15	Monet: Across the Sea of Time	Mojiri Adachi	Kento Hayashi, Mone Kamishiraishi	
N O V E M B E R	19	Hara o Kukutte	Daisaku Kimura	Kento Yamazaki, Kenichi Matsuyama, Ryuhei Matsuda, Kotone Furukawa, Kanichiro, Akira Emoto, Tomoyo Harada, Jun Kaname, Tōru Nakamura, Ken Watanabe, Hiroshi Abe, Kōichi Satō	

=== TBA ===
Opening		Title	Director	Cast	Ref.
U P C O M I N G	TBA	Ooloo Blue	Yusuke Kitaguchi	Gori, Ayumi Ito, Ciel Isono, Osamu Hirata	
U P C O M I N G	TBA	City Hunter 2	Keiichiro Shiraki	Ryohei Suzuki, Misato Morita, Fumino Kimura	
U P C O M I N G	TBA	Cherry and Virgin	Masanao Kawajiri	Takashi Okado, Yaeko Kiyose	
U P C O M I N G	TBA	Haikyu!! The Movie: vs. the Little Giant	Susumu Mitsunaka	TBA	
U P C O M I N G	TBA	Haikyu!! The Movie: Where Monsters Go	Susumu Mitsunaka	TBA	
U P C O M I N G	TBA	Hoshi no Oto	Ming-Chih Lin	Sora Tamaki, Hank Wang	
U P C O M I N G	TBA	How to Kill Sugimori-kun	Yusuke Morii	TBA	
U P C O M I N G	TBA	Pansy na Watashi ni Happy End o	Ririko Masuzawa	Riho Nakamura, Kilala Inori, Masaki Ota, Momoka, Miu Kainuma, Akisa Yagi	
U P C O M I N G	TBA	The Credits Roll into the Sea	Taichi Ishidate	TBA	
U P C O M I N G	TBA	San Juan no Ki	Sho Igarashi	Masato Hagiwara, Kayo Ise	
U P C O M I N G	TBA	AARO: All-Domain Anomaly Resolution Office – The Movie	Jun'ichi Ishikawa	Tatsuya Fujiwara, Alice Hirose	
U P C O M I N G	TBA	AARO: All-Domain Anomaly Resolution Office – The Movie 2	Jun'ichi Ishikawa	Tatsuya Fujiwara, Alice Hirose	
U P C O M I N G	TBA	When I Saw Your Sound	Kazuhisa Imai	Momoko Tanabe, Tōru Nakamura	
U P C O M I N G	TBA	Samurai Hustle: Full Throttle	Katsuhide Motoki	Kuranosuke Sasaki, Kyoko Fukada, Tsuyoshi Ihara, Yasufumi Terawaki, Yusuke Kamiji, Yuri Chinen, Tokio Emoto, Seiji Rokkaku, Masahiko Nishimura	
U P C O M I N G	TBA	Incinerator	Shuntaro Uchida	Karin, Taiki Shinozuka, Akiko Kikuchi, Takuma Nagao	
U P C O M I N G	TBA	High&Low: The New World	Shigeaki Kubo, Norihisa Hiranuma	Akira, Naoto, Alan Shirahama, Kazuma Kawamura, Hokuto Yoshino	
U P C O M I N G	TBA	The Blue We Touch	Hiroshi Ishikawa	Nao, Erika Karata, Yuzu Aoki, Arisa Nakano, Ayumu Nakajima	
U P C O M I N G	TBA	Wasted Chef	Takayuki Hirao	TBA	
U P C O M I N G	TBA	Summer Time Rendering	Ken Ninomiya	TBA	
U P C O M I N G	TBA	Boke Biyori	Eiji Uchida	Shinobu Otake, Tomokazu Miura, Sho Sakurai	
U P C O M I N G	TBA	Underdog	Tomo Goda	Koshi Mizukami, Masashi Ikeda, Kousei Yuki	
U P C O M I N G	TBA	One Piece Film: God Valley	TBA	TBA	
U P C O M I N G	TBA	Senkaku 1945	Takumi Igarashi	Kentaro Tomita, Michiko Hada, Tokuma Nishioka, Kyoko Toyama, Yoko Gushiken, Yasuo Daichi, Takaaki Enoki	
U P C O M I N G	TBA	Haha no Matsu Sato	Tetsu Maeda	Sayuri Yoshinaga	
U P C O M I N G	TBA	Pokémon: Wild Card	Katsuhiko Kitada	TBA	
U P C O M I N G	TBA	Death Valley'95	Masaki Suda, Kento Yamada	Masaki Suda	
U P C O M I N G	TBA	Traveling Practice	Kohei Sanada	Ayumu Nakajima, Furi Nanase	
U P C O M I N G	TBA	Ama	Yuki Kawamura	Ryōko Fujino, Machiko Ono	
U P C O M I N G	TBA	Kefi	Kishin Saito	Riho Takada, Tone Kaiya, Mari Iriki, Konatsu Kato, Sō Takei	
U P C O M I N G	TBA	Saturday Night Theatre	Taiki Endo	Ryota Bando, Akari Takaishi, Asuka Saitō, Kuruma Takahira	
U P C O M I N G	TBA	The Eminence in Shadow: Lost Echoes	Kazuya Nakanishi	Seiichiro Yamashita, Yui Horie, Inori Minase, Takehito Koyasu, Yukari Tamura	
U P C O M I N G	TBA	Even If My Prayers Go Unanswered, I Have Something to Tell You	Hana Matsumoto	Hana Toyoshima, Yuto Nasu	
U P C O M I N G	TBA	Kono Natsu, Dare mo Sukuenai Bokura wa, Sora ni Sakenda	Tomoyuki Fujiwara	Kairi Jo, Kotona Minami, Eiichiro Funakoshi	
U P C O M I N G	TBA	Kegareta Seichi-Junrei ni Tsuite	TBA	TBA	

== See also ==
- 2027 in Japan
