= Tokyo 20th district =

Electoral district in Tokyo, Japan

Tokyo 20th District
- 東京都第20区
- Parliamentary constituency for the Japanese House of Representatives
- Prefecture: Tokyo
- Proportional Block: Tokyo
- Electorate: 419,465 (as of 1 September 2022)

Current constituency
- Created: 1994
- Seats: One
- Party: LDP
- Representative: Seiji Kihara

Tokyo 20th District (東京都第20区, Tokyo-to dai-niju-ku) is an electoral district of the Japanese House of Representatives. The district was created in 1994 as part of the move to single-member districts that same year, and the district is currently represented by the Liberal Democratic Party's Seiji Kihara.

== Areas covered ==
As of 13 January 2023, the areas covered by this district area as follows:

- Higashimurayama
- Higashiyamato
- Kiyose
- Higashikurume
- Musashimurayama

Since its creation in 1994, the borders of this district have so far not been changed.

== Elected representatives ==
Representative	Party	Years served	Notes
Yuriko Ono	NFP	1996-2000	
Koichi Kato	DPJ	2000-2005	
Seiji Kihara	LDP	2005-2009	
Koichi Kato	DPJ	2009-2012	
Seiji Kihara	LDP	2012-	Incumbent

== Election results ==
‡ - Also ran in the Tokyo PR district

‡‡ - Also ran and won in the Tokyo PR district

2026
Party	Candidate	Votes	%	±%
LDP	Seiji Kihara^{‡}	108,985	48.6	▲5.6
DPP	Kentarō Oonishi^{‡}	46,910	20.9	▼9.3
JCP	Toru Miyamoto^{‡}	45,031	20.1	▼6.7
Sanseitō	Shigeki Kakeyama	23,544	10.5	
Registered electors		417,602		
Turnout			56.30	▲1.72
LDP hold				

2024
Party	Candidate	Votes	%	±%
LDP	Seiji Kihara^{‡}	93,390	43.03	▼9.57
DPP	Kentarō Oonishi^{‡}	65,435	30.15	New
JCP	Toru Miyamoto^{‡}	58,215	26.82	▼1.98
Registered electors		417,159		
Turnout		216,950	54.58	▼2.22

2021
Party	Candidate	Votes	%	±%
LDP	Seiji Kihara^{‡} (incumbent) (endorsed by Komeito)	121,621	52.6	▲2.7
JCP	Toru Miyamoto^{‡‡} (incumbent - Tokyo PR) (endorsed by the SDP)	66,516	28.8	▲2.0
Ishin	Junichiro Maeda^{‡}	43,089	18.6	New
Registered electors		418,245		
Turnout		237,438	56.8	▲3.2
LDP hold		Swing	▲2.5	

2017
Party	Candidate	Votes	%	±%
LDP	Seiji Kihara^{‡} (incumbent) (endorsed by Komeito)	107,686	49.9	▼2.2
JCP	Toru Miyamoto^{‡‡} (incumbent - Tokyo PR) (endorsed by the SDP)	57,741	26.8	▲2.5
Kibō no Tō	Akira Shikano^{‡}	50,439	23.4	New
Registered electors		415,565		
Turnout		222,909	53.6	▼0.9
LDP hold		Swing	▼7.0	

2014
Party	Candidate	Votes	%	±%
LDP	Seiji Kihara^{‡} (incumbent) (endorsed by Komeito)	110,273	52.1	▲11.7
Democratic	Mitsuaki Takeda^{‡} (endorsed by the JIP)	51,362	24.3	▼1.1
JCP	Mariko Ikeda	49,902	23.6	▲10.0
Registered electors		404,949		
Turnout		220,576	54.5	▲3.2
LDP hold		Swing	▲8.1	

2012
Party	Candidate	Votes	%	±%
LDP	Seiji Kihara^{‡} (endorsed by Komeito)	98,070	40.4	▲4.4
Democratic	Koichi Kato^{‡} (incumbent) (endorsed by the PNP)	61,519	25.4	▼25.8
Restoration	Kazusa Noda^{‡}	50,031	20.6	New
JCP	Mariko Ikeda	33,092	13.6	▲1.8
Registered electors		402,763		
Turnout		254,264	63.1	▼5.0
LDP gain from Democratic		Swing	▲5.5	

2009
Party	Candidate	Votes	%	±%
Democratic	Koichi Kato^{‡} (incumbent - Tokyo PR) (endorsed by the SDP)	136,294	51.2	▲2.7
LDP	Seiji Kihara^{‡} (incumbent)	95,718	36.0	▼6.6
JCP	Mariko Ikeda^{‡}	31,475	11.8	▼1.0
Happiness Realization	Kazuyuki Abe	2,560	1.0	New
Registered electors		398,174		
Turnout		271,157	68.1	▲1.1
Democratic gain from LDP		Swing	▲5.1	

2005
Party	Candidate	Votes	%	±%
LDP	Seiji Kihara^{‡}	112,634	44.6	▲7.4
Democratic	Toru Miyamoto^{‡‡} (incumbent)	107,916	42.7	▼8.0
JCP	Mariko Ikeda^{‡}	32,299	12.8	▲0.7
Registered electors		388,041		
Turnout		259,794	67.0	▲6.9
LDP gain from Democratic		Swing	▲3.7	

2003
Party	Candidate	Votes	%	±%
Democratic	Koichi Kato^{‡} (incumbent)	111,041	50.7	▲11.2
LDP	Seiichiro Shimizu^{‡}	81,588	37.2	New
JCP	Mariko Ikeda	26,434	12.1	▼3.1
Registered electors		380,991		
Turnout		237,438	60.1	▼4.8
Democratic hold		Swing	▲15.2	

2000
Party	Candidate	Votes	%	±%
Democratic	Koichi Kato^{‡}	93,236	39.5	▲19.2
Komeito	Yuriko Ono^{‡}	58,613	24.8	▲2.0
Independent	Seiichiro Shimizu	48,613	20.6	New
JCP	Ikuo Suzuki	35,826	15.2	▼1.9
Registered electors		371,592		
Turnout		241,052	64.9	
Democratic gain from New Frontier		Swing	▲9.6	

1996
Party	Candidate	Votes	%	±%
New Frontier	Yuriko Ono	55,559	27.0	New
LDP	Seiichiro Shimizu^{‡}	54,582	26.5	New
Democratic	Shino Nakano^{‡}	41,705	20.3	New
JCP	Nobuhiro Maesawa	35,150	17.1	New
Independent	Naoko Asaki	13,957	6.8	New
New Socialist	Etsuko Nagata	4,878	2.4	New
Registered electors		360,803		
Turnout		210,925	58.5	N/A
New Frontier win (new seat)				
