= Misumi Kubo =

Japanese writer

- 窪 美澄
- Born: 1965 (age 60–61); Inagi, Tokyo, Japan
- Occupation: Writer
- Writing career
- Language: Japanese
- Genres: Novel; Short story; Speculative fiction; Erotic literature
- Notable works: Fugainai boku wa sora o mita; Seiten no mayoikujira; Jitto te o miru; Yoru ni hoshi o hanatsu
- Notable awards: R-18 Literature Award; Yamamoto Shūgorō Prize; Naoki Prize

Misumi Kubo (窪 美澄, Kubo Misumi; born 1965) is a Japanese writer. She has won the R-18 Literary Award, the Yamamoto Shūgorō Prize, the Yamada Fūtarō Prize, and the Naoki Prize. Her work has been adapted for film and television, including the 2012 film The Cowards Who Looked to the Sky.

== Early life and education ==
Kubo was born in 1965 in Inagi, a city in western Tokyo. She attended Catholic schools through junior high and high school, then dropped out of junior college and worked part-time jobs before landing full-time work at an advertising company. After the birth of her child she became a freelance nonfiction writer and editor focusing particularly on women's health and medicine.

== Career ==
In 2009, Kubo's short story "Mikumari" won the R-18 Literary Award, a prize for erotic short fiction by new women writers. Her first book Fugainai boku wa sora o mita (ふがいない僕は空を見た), a sexually explicit set of stories about the relationship between a woman seeking fertility treatments and the teenage son of the woman who runs the clinic, was published by Shinchosha in 2010. The next year Fugainai boku wa sora o mita won the 24th Yamamoto Shūgorō Prize. It was later adapted into the 2012 Yuki Tanada film The Cowards Who Looked to the Sky, starring Tomoko Tabata and Kento Nagayama.

Kubo's second book, Seiten no mayoikujira (晴天の迷いクジラ), a story about three people who travel to see a stranded whale, was published by Shinchosha in 2012. Seiten no mayoikujira won the 3rd Yamada Futarō Prize, which is awarded by Kadokawa Shoten to works in the same artistic spirit as those of mystery writer Futaro Yamada. Several books followed, including the linked story collection Yoru no fukurami (よるのふくらみ) in 2014, the 2015 novel Sayonara niruvāna (さよなら、ニルヴァーナ, Goodbye, Nirvana), which dramatized an actual case of murder of a young girl by a teenage boy, the 2016 speculative fiction novel Akagami (アカガミ), which imagined Japan in 2030 after rising youth suicide rates and declining fertility, and the 2017 novel Yameru toki mo sukoyaka naru toki mo (やめるときも, すこやかなるときも).

An English version of Kubo's early short story "Mikumari", translated by Polly Barton, was published in 2017 by Strangers Press. The next year Kubo's novel Jitto te o miru (じっと手を見る), a story about relationships among nursing caregivers, was published by Gentosha. Jitto te o miru was nominated for the 159th Naoki Prize and led the voting among selection committee members in the first round, but the prize was awarded to Rio Shimamoto. The following year her story Trinity (トリニティ, Toriniti) was nominated for the 161st Naoki Prize. A Nippon TV adaptation of Yameru toki mo sukoyaka naru toki mo, starring Taisuke Fujigaya of the boy band Kis-My-Ft2, aired in early 2020. In 2022, Kubo was awarded the 167th Naoki Prize for her short story collection Yoru ni hoshi o hanatsu (夜に星を放つ, Shooting Stars into the Night Sky).

== Recognition ==
- 2009: 8th R-18 Literary Prize
- 2011: 24th Yamamoto Shūgorō Prize
- 2012: 3rd Yamada Fūtarō Prize
- 2022: 167th Naoki Prize

== Selected works ==
=== In Japanese ===
- Fugainai boku wa sora o mita (ふがいない僕は空を見た), Shinchosha, 2010, ISBN 9784103259213 (includes "Mikumari")
- Seiten no mayoikujira (晴天の迷いクジラ, Stray Whale On a Clear Day), Shinchosha, 2012, ISBN 9784103259220
- Yoru no fukurami (よるのふくらみ), Shinchosha, 2014, ISBN 9784103259244
- Sayonara niruvāna (さよなら、ニルヴァーナ, Goodbye, Nirvana), Bungeishunjū, 2015, ISBN 9784163902562
- Akagami (アカガミ), Kawade Shobō Shinsha, 2016, ISBN 9784309024608
- Yameru toki mo sukoyaka naru toki mo (やめるときも, すこやかなるときも), Shueisha, 2017, ISBN 9784087710526
- Jitto te o miru (じっと手を見る), Gentosha, 2018, ISBN 9784344032750
- Yoru ni hoshi o hanatsu (夜に星を放つ, Shooting Stars into the Night Sky), Bungeishunjū, 2022, ISBN 9784163915418

=== In English ===
- "From the Left Bank of the Flu" (インフルエンザの左岸から, 2015), translated from the Japanese by Polly Barton, Granta, 2017
- Mikumari, trans. Polly Barton, Strangers Press, 2017, ISBN 9781911343073
- So We Look to the Sky, trans. Polly Barton, Arcade Publishing, 2021 ISBN 9781951627713

== See also ==
- List of Japanese women writers
