= Kaho Nakayama =

Kaho Nakayama may refer to:

- Kaho Nakayama (writer)
- Kaho Nakayama (handballer)
