= One Million Yen Girl =

- Poster
- Directed by: Yuki Tanada
- Written by: Yuki Tanada
- Produced by: Kumi Kobata; Koko Maeda
- Starring: Yū Aoi; Mirai Moriyama
- Cinematography: Kei Yasuda
- Edited by: Takashige Kikui; Ryūji Miyajima
- Music by: Ko Hirano; Eiko Sakurai
- Distributed by: Nikkatsu
- Release date: 19 July 2008 (Japan)
- Running time: 121 minutes
- Country: Japan
- Language: Japanese
- Box office: $3.9 million (est.)

One Million Yen Girl (Japanese: 百万円と苦虫女, Hepburn: Hyakuman-en to nigamushi onna) is a 2008 Japanese drama film written and directed by Yuki Tanada. The film is a variation of seishun-eiga and a family drama that tells the story from a woman's perspective. Suzuko Sato (Yū Aoi), the troubled 21-year-old female protagonist sets out on a journey to escape her troubles and live on her own terms by moving each time she saves up one million Yen, but ultimately finds that grass is always greener on the other side.

In Japanese films, it is unusual for women to take the initiative, however, One Million Yen Girl subverts this traditional narrative framework. The film became one of Yuki Tanada's most popular works, incorporating themes of feminism and aiming to redefine the gender role and space for women in the film industry. Despite limited box-office success, the film has grown in popularity over the years and garnered awards and recognition beyond its initial reception.

== Plot ==
21-year-old Suzuko Sato works part-time at a restaurant after graduating from junior college and failing to get a proper full-time job. She lives with her parents and her younger brother Takuya Sato in the sixth grade, but feels uncomfortable with this. Then, her fellow part-time worker Riko proposes that they share an apartment and she agrees. Right before moving into the apartment, Suzuko is surprised to hear from Riko that Riko's boyfriend Takeshi Hamada will also be sharing the room with them. Suzuko reluctantly agrees and moves in after Takeshi, and is then even more surprised to learn that Riko has already broken up with Takeshi, and that she and Takeshi will be the only two sharing the apartment.

One rainy day, Suzuko finds a kitten that was left in a cardboard box and brings it back to the apartment. Takeshi abandons the kitten while Suzuko goes out to buy food for the kitten. Suzuko goes out to look for it, but finds it on the road, already dead. Angry, Suzuko throws away all of Takeshi's belongings while he is away, and moves out of the apartment herself. Suzuko is then criminally charged by Takeshi for property damage, and is put in a detention facility and receives a 200,000 yen fine which she pays. After returning home from the facility, she is then strongly criticized by her younger brother, who feels her criminal record will affect the outcome of his entrance exams. She also becomes a subject of gossip for her neighbours. Uncomfortable, Suzuko declares to her family that she will leave home when she saves up one million yen.

After working hard to earn one million yen, she settles at a seaside town and works at a beachside restaurant. Her work at the restaurant goes well, but she is annoyed by Yuuki, a regular customer, who keeps flirting with her, and so she quits the beach house as soon as her savings returned to one million yen.

Her next destination is a peach-producing village. She visits a coffee shop in the village and asks the elderly owner if there are any short-term part-time jobs nearby, and he introduces her to an understaffed peach farm, where she ends up working as a live-in employee harvesting peaches, staying with an elderly mother and her single middle-aged son. The village chief, who comes to know that a young woman named Suzuko has come to the village, comes to see her, accompanied by the owner of the coffee shop, and the village chief decides to make Suzuko the face of a "Peach Girl" campaign aimed to improve the village's P.R and increase its sales and its budget. Suzuko, who isn't comfortable, tries to convey this to them but they leave before she can say anything. The elderly mother's middle-aged son, who realizes this, tells her that if she doesn't make it clear that she doesn't want to do the campaign, they will force her, leading her to express her disagreement with the campaign to the coffee shop owner, who conveys this to the village chief, who holds a village meeting hall where Suzuko once again announces that she will turn down the role. Criticized by many of the villagers, Suzuko, in desperation, admits out loud that she is an ex-convict and runs out of the meeting hall. She decides to move the next day, and the mother and son of the peach farmer thank her as she leaves.

Suzuko's next destination is a small city in Saitama Prefecture, about an hour by express train from Tokyo metropolitan area. Suzuko gets a part-time job at a DIY store where she is assigned to the gardening department. Her boss, Kogure, instructs her senior at the part-time job, Ryohei Nakajima, a university student of the same age as Suzuko, to help guide her. She later finds Kogure is an unpleasant man after being scolded by him. One day, Suzuko meets Ryohei by chance while shopping at a supermarket. Ryohei invites her to a coffee shop. There, Suzuko, feeling at ease, tells Ryohei about her past, including her criminal record, and how she moves every time she reaches one million yen. Soon, Suzuko regrets having told him everything, falls into self-loathing, and runs out of the coffee shop. Ryohei catches up with Suzuko and confesses that he likes her, and Suzuko confesses the same. The two quickly become close and have a physical relationship.

Later, Miyamoto Tomoyo, who is from the same university as Ryohei, is assigned to the gardening department as a part-timer and becomes close to Ryohei. One night, after they have sex, Ryohei asks Suzuko to lend him 50,000 yen, which Suzuko lends to him. Later, Ryohei finds Suzuko while he is with Tomoyo at a coffee shop and asks for an additional loan, which Suzuko lends to him again. After this happens repeatedly, Suzuko accuses Ryohei for only loving her because she has money, and decides to break up with Ryohei and leave the town.

When Suzuko goes to the DIY store to say her final goodbyes, Ryohei pays back all the money he borrowed from her. Later, while Ryohei is working in the store, Tomoyo comes to him and says, "Are you OK being misunderstood by her? You borrowed the money from her because you didn't want her to leave after her savings reached a million yen, but she left before she saved up a million yen!" Ryohei chases Suzuko to the station on his bicycle and is unable to catch up, but the two exchange glances on and off the footbridge.

== Cast ==
- Yū Aoi as Suzuko Sato, a 21-year-old woman who tries to define her own rules and avoids her problems by saving up one million yen and moving away.
- Mirai Moriyama as Ryohei Nakajima, Suzuko's love interest and co-worker.
- Ryusei Saito as Takuya Sato, Suzuko's younger brother, who is seen as the ideal child, but has problems at school and looks up to his sister.
- Pierre Taki as Haruo Fujii, an older peach farmer who awkwardly looks out for Suzuko.
- Sumie Sasaki as Fujii Kinu, an elderly woman who offered Suzuko a job picking peaches.
- Takashi Sasano as Siraishi - Master of Kissaten 'White', an elderly man who found Suzuko in a cafe and offered to find her a job.
- Terunosuke Takezai as Yuuki, a flirt who tried to hit on Suzuko.
- Kami Hiraiwa as Riko, Suzuko's co-worker and supposed roommate.
- Tomohisa Yuge as Takeshi, Riko's ex-boyfriend and Suzuko's brief roommate.
- Noriko Eguchi as Yayoi Asano, Takuya's school teacher.
- Kota Mizumori as Noguchi

== Production ==
=== Writing ===
One Million Yen Girl was written and directed by Yuki Tanada. When asked about the sources of inspiration and the writing, she stated that she wanted her films to be about just an ordinary person who has to deal with problems that would ordinarily would arise in life.

=== Casting ===
The lead actress in One Million Yen Girl named Yū Aoi worked with Yuki Tanada before and after this film. However, other actors and actresses are not known to have worked with the director before or after this film.

=== Crew ===
On top of the woman director and actress, the film also consists of mostly women production crews. The producers are Ko Hirano, who has worked on 16 other films, and Koko Maeda, who has helped to produce Kill Bill: Vol. 1, Kill Bill: Vol. 2, and many others. The cinematographer, Kei Yasuda has also worked on many other films, including one with Yuki Tanada's Moon and Cherry (2004). The editors, Takashige Kikui and Ryūji Miyajima, are established and have worked on more than 20 other films. However, the music composers, Ko Hirano and Eiko Sakurai were only starting out when the film was made.

== Reception ==
=== Box office ===
One Million Yen Girl was initially released in Japan and Taiwan as of 2008. The recorded estimated box office gross receipts of approximately $3.9 million.

=== Critical response ===
One Million Yen Girl was selected as the winner of the Directors Guild of Japan New Directors Award in 2008. The film has also won My Movies Audience Award of the Far East Film Festival that took place in Udine, Italy in 2009. This is the first film that Yuki Tanada was able to find success using the middle ground budget which many other Japanese directors have struggled with because the Japanese film industry is mainly divided into only two industry: the mega budget and the low budget.
