= Seiji Kihara =

Japanese politician (born 1970)

- 木原 誠二
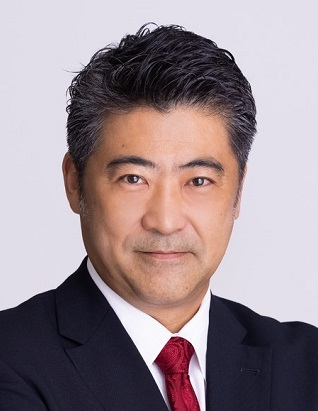
- Official portrait, 2021

Deputy Chief Cabinet Secretary (Political affairs, House of Representatives)
- In office 4 October 2021 – 13 September 2023
- Prime Minister: Fumio Kishida
- Preceded by: Manabu Sakai
- Succeeded by: Hideki Murai

Member of the House of Representatives
- Incumbent
- Assumed office 16 December 2012
- Preceded by: Koichi Kato
- Constituency: Tokyo 20th
- In office 11 September 2005 – 21 July 2009
- Preceded by: Koichi Kato
- Succeeded by: Koichi Kato
- Constituency: Tokyo 20th

Personal details
- Born: 8 June 1970 (age 56) Shibuya, Tokyo, Japan
- Party: Liberal Democratic
- Education: University of Tokyo
- Website: https://kiharaseiji.com/

Seiji Kihara (木原 誠二, Kihara Seiji; born 8 June 1970) is a Japanese politician of the Liberal Democratic Party. A former Parliamentary Vice-Minister for Foreign Affairs and former State Minister for Foreign Affairs (Third Abe Cabinet) and former Deputy Chief Cabinet Secretary, he currently serves as a member of the House of Representatives in the Diet (national legislature).

== Early life and education ==
Kihara was born in Shibuya, Tokyo on 8 June 1970. He lived in Chicago, United States from when he was nine months old until he turned five. He also lived in Amsterdam in his youth. He attended Musashi High School and Junior High School and matriculated at the University of Tokyo in 1989, where he studied law.

== At the Ministry of Finance ==
Upon his graduation from university, Kihara joined the Ministry of Finance in 1993. This coincided with the start of the Lost Decades, a twenty-year period of economic stagnation the country would experience, and he was assigned to a department that dealt with bankrupt securities companies. While working as a civil servant, Kihara studied at the London School of Economics for two years and earned a master's degree in 1995. After working in the law and legislation department at the ministry, he returned to England as a liaison officer and worked for Her Majesty's Treasury, the British counterpart of the Ministry of Finance. While in England, he had the chance to get acquainted with Margaret Thatcher, who advised him that 'in a democracy, politics performs better than bureaucracy in the long run because of the brilliance and intelligence of all the people in the country'. She also told him, 'politics is the loftiest of human activities because it is entirely about the realisation of one's beliefs', and encouraged him to pursue a political career instead.

== Political career ==
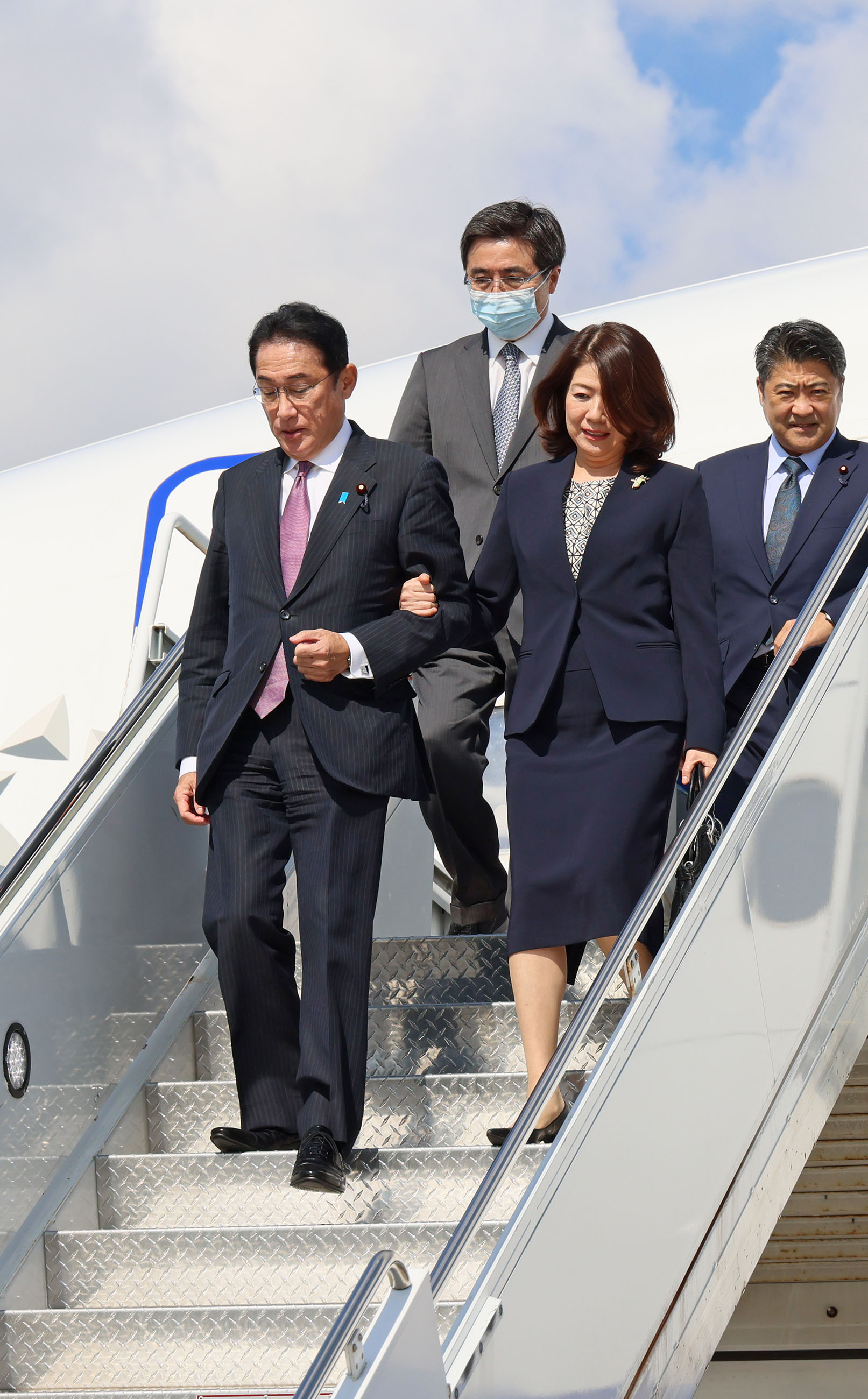
Kihara (right) arriving in New York City for the 2022 United Nations General Assembly accompanying Kishida

Kihara resigned from the ministry in August 2005 to stand in the 44th General Election in September that year as an official Liberal Democrat candidate, winning the seat for Tokyo 20th constituency. After serving a four-year term, he lost his seat in the 45th General Election, in which his party's seats fell from 296 to 119, making it the main opposition party. He regained his seat in the 46th General Election in 2012, and has since won the 47th, 48th, and 49th elections, in 2014, 2017, and 2021, respectively.

A member of the centre-right Kōchikai faction within the party, Kihara has been one of Fumio Kishida's closest aides, with Kishida calling him one of the people he trusts most while campaigning for him in 2021. After Kishida came to power in 2021, Kihara was at the centre of policymaking as Deputy Chief Cabinet Secretary. He was the main promoter of the NISA, which allows individuals residing in Japan to invest up to 3.6 million yen annually without paying capital gains tax. Modelled after the UK's ISA system, the tax arrangement has been used by 23.2 million people as of April 2024. In an interview with The Nikkei, Kihara stated that he found it problematic that the gross financial assets of Japanese households had increased by only 40% compared to 240% in the United States over the past two decades. The main aim of the policy, he said, was to make it easier for households to benefit from corporate profit growth.

Kihara was replaced in September 2023. In November 2024 he was appointed chairman of the LDP Election Strategy Committee, to replace Shinjiro Koizumi, who resigned after the 2024 general election.
