= Moon and Cherry =

- DVD cover
- Directed by: Yuki Tanada
- Written by: Yuki Tanada
- Produced by: Yasuhiko Higashi; Hiroo Murakami; Tadashi Ono; Ichiro Shirai
- Starring: Noriko Eguchi; Tasuku Nagaoka; Misako Hirata
- Cinematography: Kei Yasuda
- Edited by: Sumiyo Mihashi
- Music by: Sei Komiyama
- Production company: Culture Publishers
- Release date: 25 December 2004 (Japan)
- Running time: 82 minutes
- Country: Japan
- Language: Japanese

Moon and Cherry (Japanese: 月とチェリー, Hepburn: Tsuki to Cherii) is a 2004 Japanese romantic comedy film directed by Yuki Tanada. It was released on 25 December 2004, in Japan.

== Cast ==
- Noriko Eguchi as Mayama
- Tasuku Nagaoka as Tadokoro
- Misako Hirata
- Yoshikazu Ebisu
- Shungiku Uchida
- Akira Emoto as Sakamoto

== Reception ==
Tom Mes of Midnight Eye called the film "a lively, hugely enjoyable romp".
