= Midnight Eye =

Japanese film review website

- Website type: Film criticism Literary criticism Interviews
- Available in: English
- Creators: Tom Mes; Jasper Sharp; Martin Mes
- Website: www.midnighteye.com
- Launched: 2001; 25 years ago
- Current status: Online

Midnight Eye was a non-profit review website launched in 2001 by Tom Mes, Jasper Sharp, and Martin Mes. The website features reviews and analyses of Japanese films, as well as book reviews and interviews with filmmakers. In June 2015, it was announced that no further content would be added to the website.

== History ==
Editor Tom Mes, alongside his brother, designer and programmer Martin Mes, and fellow editor Jasper Sharp, launched the website in spring 2001. Tom Mes conceived the idea for the website after watching a retrospective of then-recent Japanese films at the Rotterdam Film Festival in 2000.

In 2004, Tom Mes and Sharp published The Midnight Eye Guide to New Japanese Film, a book about Japanese cinema which includes over 100 reviews of Japanese films, and which features a foreword by Hideo Nakata. Throughout its history, the website has published articles by numerous contributors, along with interviews with filmmakers such as Takashi Miike, Hayao Miyazaki, Satoshi Kon, and Yuki Tanada, among others.

On 29 June 2015, Sharp and the Mes brothers announced that the website was retiring, and that no further content would be added to it. In their announcement, they wrote "The site will remain as and where it is for the time being, but after fifteen years of creating the main source of info on Japanese cinema in the English language we are calling it a day."

== Reception ==
Midnight Eye has been referenced by such publications and companies as Bustle, the Criterion Collection, DVD Talk, Forbes, and Vice.
