= Noriko Eguchi =

Japanese actress (born 1980)

Noriko Eguchi (江口 のりこ, Eguchi Noriko; born 28 April 1980) is a Japanese film and television actress. She became a student in the theater troupe Tokyo Kandenchi in 2000, and made her film debut in 2002 with Takashi Miike's Shangri-La. She had her first starring role in Yuki Tanada's Moon and Cherry in 2004.

== Filmography ==
=== Films ===
- Shangri-La (2002)
- Moon and Cherry (2004)
- Josee, the Tiger and the Fish (2003)
- All About My Dog (2005)
- Heart, Beating in the Dark (2005)
- Memories of Matsuko (2006)
- One Million Yen Girl (2008)
- Fine, Totally Fine (2008)
- Yuriko's Aroma (2010) as Yuriko
- Heaven's Story (2010)
- Patisserie Coin de rue (2011)
- We Can't Change the World. But, We Wanna Build a School in Cambodia. (2011)
- The Story of Yonosuke (2013) as Kyōko Kogure
- Close-Knit (2017)
- Asahinagu (2017)
- Tornado Girl (2017)
- Just Only Love (2019) as Sumire
- My Girlfriend Is a Serial Killer (2019)
- Stolen Identity 2 (2020)
- Masked Ward (2020)
- My Name is Yours (2020)
- Stigmatized Properties (2020)
- Soiree (2020)
- Riverside Mukolitta (2022)
- Tsuyukusa (2022)
- It's in the Woods (2022)
- Ripples (2023) as Hitomi Ogasawara
- Undercurrent (2023) as Yōko Kanno
- Bad Lands (2023) as Hino
- Amalock (2024) as Yūko
- What If Shogun Ieyasu Tokugawa Was to Become the Prime Minister (2024) as Hōjō Masako
- Rude to Love (2024) as Momoko Hatsuse
- To Mom, With Love (2024) as Yayoi
- Blue Period (2024) as Mayu Ōba
- The 35-Year Promise (2025), Sawako
- The Boy and the Dog (2025)
- The Hikikomori Extraction (2026)
- The Gate of Murder (2027), Kaede Kadota

=== Television ===
- Part-Time Detective 2 (2004) as Sunrise Dining Employee
- Hana Moyu (2015)
- Old Jack and Rose (2021)
- The 13 Lords of the Shogun (2022), Kame
- Fixer (2023), Yukino Sasaki
- Anpan (2025), Hatako Asada
- Extremely Inappropriate! Special (2026), Junko Taira
- Did Someone Happen to Mention Me? (2026), Machiko

== Awards and nominations ==
Year	Award	Category	Work(s)	Result	Ref.
2021	44th Japan Academy Film Prize	Best Supporting Actress	Stigmatized Properties	Nominated	
2021	14th Tokyo Drama Awards	Best Supporting Actress	Story of My Family!!!	Won	
2022	46th Elan d'or Awards	Newcomer of the Year	Herself	Won	
2022	47th Hochi Film Awards	Best Supporting Actress	Tsuyukusa, Riverside Mukolitta and It's in the Woods	Nominated	
2024	37th Nikkan Sports Film Awards	Best Actress	Amalock, Rude to Love, and To Mom, With Love	Nominated	
