= Kaori Ekuni =

Japanese author (born 1964)

- 江國 香織
- Born: 21 March 1964 (age 62)
- Citizenship: Japan
- Writing career
- Language: japanese

Kaori Ekuni (江國 香織 Ekuni Kaori, born 21 March 1964) is a Japanese author.

== Biography ==
She was born in Setagaya, Tokyo. Her father is Japanese haiku poet and essayist, Shigeru Ekuni.

== Reception ==
In Japan, she was dubbed the female Murakami. Her numerous works of fiction have been translated into several languages and published in many countries, including her novel Twinkle Twinkle, which has been translated into English.

From 2004 to 2008 her books were continuously in Korea's top 50 bestsellers list. Twinkle Twinkle was a bestseller in 1991.

== Works ==
=== Selected works in English ===
- "Girl Friends", trans. Sharni Wilson, Lunch Ticket, 2020
- "Night, wife, detergent", trans. Sharni Wilson, Asymptote, 2020

== Awards ==
- Murasaki Shikibu Prize, 1992, Kirakira Hikaru
- Yamamoto Shūgorō Prize, 2001, It's not safe or suitable to swim
- Naoki Prize, 2004 Gokyu suru Junbi wa Dekiteita

== See also ==
- Japanese Literature
