= Yamamoto Shūgorō Prize =

Japanese literary award

- 山本周五郎賞 (Yamamoto Shūgorō Shō)
- Awarded for: Fiction that best exemplifies storytelling
- Country: Japan
- Presented by: Shinchō Society for the Promotion of Literary Arts
- Reward: ¥1,000,000
- First award: 1988; 38 years ago
- Website: www.shinchosha.co.jp/prizes/yamamotosho/

The Yamamoto Shūgorō Prize (山本周五郎賞) is a Japanese literary award established in 1988 in memory of author Shūgorō Yamamoto. It was created and continues to be sponsored by the Shinchosha Publishing company, which published Yamamoto's Complete Works. The prize is awarded annually to a new work of fiction considered to exemplify the art of storytelling, by a five-person panel consisting of fellow authors. Winners receive ¥1 million.

Unlike the Mishima Yukio Prize, which was established at the same time and focuses on literary fiction, the Yamamoto Shūgorō Prize is more broad, encompassing a wide range of genre fiction that includes historical and period fiction, mysteries, fantasy, erotica, and more. Candidate works and prize winners for both prizes are typically announced in May each year and covered in national print media.

Notable winners have included Banana Yoshimoto, whose winning novel Goodbye Tsugumi was later published in English, erotic and romance novelist Misumi Kubo, and crime fiction and thriller author Kanae Minato. Several prize winners have gone on to win the Naoki Prize, including Riku Onda, Miyuki Miyabe, Kaori Ekuni, and Honobu Yonezawa.

== List of winners ==
An official list of winning and nominated works is maintained by Shinchosha, the prize sponsor.

Year	Author	Japanese Title	English Title
1988	Taichi Yamada	Ijin-tachi to no natsu (異人たちとの夏)	Strangers (tr. Wayne Lammers, 2003)
1989	Banana Yoshimoto	TUGUMI	Goodbye Tsugumi (tr. Michael Emmerich, 2002)
1990	Joh Sasaki	Etorofu-hatsu Kinkyūden (エトロフ発緊急電)	
1991	Itsura Inami	Dakku Kōru (ダック・コール, Duck Call)	
1992	Yoichi Funado	Suna no kuronikuru (砂のクロニクル)	
1993	Miyuki Miyabe	Kasha (火車)	All She Was Worth (tr. Alfred Birnbaum, 1999)
1994	Teruhiko Kuze	1934-nen Fuyu: Rampo (一九三四年冬―乱歩)	
1995	Hōsei Hahakigi	Heisa Byōtō (閉鎖病棟, Closed Word)	
1996	Arata Tendō	Kazoku-Gari (家族狩り)	
1997	Yūichi Shinpo	Dasshu (奪取)	
1997	Setsuko Shinoda	Gosaintan: Kami no Za (ゴサインタン―神の座―)	
1998	Yang Sok-il	Chi to hone (血と骨)	Blood and Bones
1999	Kiyoshi Shigematsu	Eiji (エイジ)	
2000	Shimako Iwai	Bokkē, Kyōtē (ぼっけえ、きょうてえ)	Too Scary
2001	Yuzaburo Otokawa	Go nen no Ume (五年の梅)	The Five-Year Plum Tree
2001	Kaho Nakayama	Shiroi Bara no Fuchi made (白い薔薇の淵まで)	To the Depths of White Roses
2002	Shuichi Yoshida	Parēdo (パレード)	Parade
2002	Kaori Ekuni	Oyogu no ni Anzen de mo Tekisetsu de mo Arimasen (泳ぐのに、安全でも適切でもありません)	Not Safe or Suitable for Swimming
2003	Natsuhiko Kyogoku	Nozoki Koheiji (覘き小平次)	Peeping Koheiji
2004	Tatsuya Kumagai	Kaikō no Mori (邂逅の森)	
2005	Ryōsuke Kakine	Kimi tachi ni Asu wa Nai (君たちに明日はない)	You Have No Tomorrow
2005	Hiroshi Ogiwara	Ashita no Kioku (明日の記憶)	Tomorrow’s Memory
2006	Haruaki Utsukibara	Antoku Tennō Hyōkaiki (安徳天皇漂海記)	Emperor Antoku beneath the Sea
2007	Tomihiko Morimi	Yoru wa Mijikashi Aruke yo Otome (夜は短し歩けよ乙女)	The Night Is Short, Walk on Girl
2007	Riku Onda	Nakaniwa no Dekigoto (中庭の出来事)	The Incident in the Courtyard
2008	Kōtarō Isaka	Gōruden Suranbā (ゴールデンスランバー; lit. 'Golden Slumber')	Remote Control (tr. Stephen Snyder, 2011)
2008	Bin Konno	Kadan: Impei Sōsa 2 (果断 隠蔽捜査2)	Decision: Cover-Up Investigation 2
2009	Kazufumi Shiraishi	Kono Mune ni Fukabuka to Tsukisasaru Ya o Nuke (この胸に深々と突き刺さる矢を抜け)	
2010	Shūsuke Michio	Kōbai no Hana (光媒の花)	Photophilous Flower
2010	Tokurō Nukui	Kōkai to Shinjitsu no Iro (後悔と真実の色)	The Colour of Truth and Regret
2011	Misumi Kubo	Fugainai Boku wa Sora o Mita (ふがいない僕は空を見た)	Feckless Me with Eyes to the Sky
2012	Maha Harada	Rakuen no Kanvasu (楽園のカンヴァス)	Painting of Paradise
2013	Fuyumi Ono	Zan'e (残穢)	Lingering Pollution
2014	Honobu Yonezawa	Mangan (満願)	
2015	Asako Yuzuki	Nairu pāchi no Joshikai (ナイルパーチの女子会, Nile Perch Women's Club)	Hooked (tr. Polly Barton, 2026)
2016	Kanae Minato	Yūtopia (ユートピア, Utopia)	
2017	Takako Satō	Akarui yoru ni dekakete (明るい夜に出かけて, Going Out in the Bright Night)	
2018	Satoshi Ogawa	Gēmu no õkoku (ゲームの王国, Kingdom of the Game)	
2019	Kasumi Asakura	Hiraba no Tsuki (平場の月)	
2020	Kazumasa Hayami	Za roiyaru famirī (ザ・ロイヤルファミリー, The Royal Family)	
2021	Kiwamu Sato	Tezcatlipoca (テスカトリポカ)	
2022	Kōtarō Sunahara	Mayuzumi-ke no kyoōdai (黛家の兄弟)	
2023	Sayako Nagai	Kobikichō no adauchi (木挽町のあだ討ち, Samurai Vengance)	
2024	Yugo Aosaki	Jirai Glico (地雷グリコ)	
2025	Hotate Shinkawa	Onna no kokkai (女の国会)	

== Nominees available in English translation ==
- 1991 - Mariko Koike, A Cappella, trans. Juliet W. Carpenter (Thames River Press, 2013)
- 2004 - Otsuichi, Zoo, trans. Terry Gallagher (Viz Media, 2009 / Shueisha English Edition, 2013)

== See also ==
- Japanese literature
