= Sparkling Rain =

2008 short story anthology

Sparkling Rain: and other fiction from Japan of women who love women
- Language: English
- Subject: lesbian fiction, short stories
- Publisher: New Victoria Publishers
- Publication date: 2008
- Pages: 216
- ISBN: 9781892281265
- OCLC: 1106987009

Sparkling Rain: and other fiction from Japan of women who love women is an English-language anthology of short stories from Japanese lesbian or bisexual women, edited by Barbara Summerhawk and Kimberly Hughes. It also includes essays about the history of Japanese lesbian literature. The anthology does not include material on works with female same-sex eroticism or undertones by publicly heterosexual authors.

== Contents ==
- "The Symbolic Tree of Lesbianism in Japan: An Overview of Lesbian Activist History and Literary Works" by Sawabe Hitomi
- "Overview of Lesbian Literature in Japan" by Watanabe Mieko
- "Returning to Asukua (To Raichō)" poem to Hiratsuka Raicho by Otake Kōkichi
- "Yoshiya Nobuko: Gazing Upon the Female", essay by Komashaku Kimi on Yoshiya Nobuko
- "Monalisa Night" by Izumo Marou
- "Junko's After School Project" by Mori Natsuko
- "The Pink Drink" by Narihara Akira
- "Lover" by Tōgarashi
- "A Story of First Love" by Uehara Chigusa
- "Night Footsteps: Paris, 249 Rue St. Denis" by Asai Saho
- "High Praise for Plica-Chan" by Mizoguchi Akiko
- "Plica-Chan" (lesbian manga) by Amamiya Sae
- "Nobita's Friend" (movie screenplay) by Desiree Lim
- "Explosions in a Faraway Sky" by Shichi Hakku
- "The Soul Comes Back" by Shirosaki Nagi
- "The Mistake" by Barbara Summerhawk
- "Sparkling Rain" by Kaho Nakayama

== Reception ==
Japan Today noted its lack of "overt eroticism". James Welker, writing in the journal Intersections, noted Summerhawk's use of the inclusive term "women who love women". For Donald Richie, writing for The Japan Times, "Sparkling Rain" was the best of the stories in the anthology, being both "a moving account and at the same time an important document". Lavender magazine described the anthology as "groundbreaking", especially enjoying the non-fiction essays included in the anthology.

Reviews also appeared in the Okazu blog of yuri anime by Erica Friedman, and the NagaZasshi DIY culture magazine from Nagasaki (Vol. 1.4, page 13) by Crystal Uchino.

The anthology was nominated in the Lambda Literary Awards and won in the "Best Anthology" category of the Golden Crown Literary Society Literary Awards for 2009.
