= Setsuko Shinoda =

Japanese writer

- 篠田 節子
- Born: 1955 (age 70–71)
- Education: Tokyo Gakugei University
- Occupation: Writer
- Writing career
- Language: Japanese
- Genres: Science fiction; Horror fiction; Fantasy fiction
- Notable works: Gosaintan; Onna-tachi no jihādo; Sutābato Māteru; Indo kurisutaru
- Notable awards: Yamamoto Shūgorō Prize; Naoki Prize; MEXT Award for the Arts; Chuo Koron Literary Prize

Setsuko Shinoda (篠田 節子, Shinoda Setsuko; born 1955) is a Japanese writer of the fiction genre. She has won the Shōsetsu Subaru Literary Prize for Newcomers, the Yamamoto Shūgorō Prize, the Naoki Prize, the Shibata Renzaburo Prize, a MEXT Award, and the Chuo Koron Literary Prize. Several of her works have been adapted for television.

== Early life and education ==
Setsuko Shinoda was born in 1955 in Tokyo. As a child she read manga by Sanpei Shirato as well as books by foreign authors such as L. Frank Baum, Arthur Conan Doyle, and Mark Twain, and aspired to become a manga artist. She graduated from Tokyo Gakugei University. Before beginning her writing career she worked as a municipal employee in Hachiōji, including working at City Hall and the municipal library. She began taking writing lessons at the Asahi Cultural Center intending to move into public relations, but ended up taking novel writing classes and writing her first novel.

== Writing career ==
In 1990 Shinoda's debut novel Kinu no hen'yō (絹の変容, The Transformation of Silk), a science fiction story about a biotech disaster that creates a monster and the social panic that follows, won the 3rd Shōsetsu Subaru Literary Prize for Newcomers. It was subsequently published in book form by Shueisha.

Seven years later, Shinoda won both the Yamamoto Shūgorō Prize and the Naoki Prize, but for different works. Shinoda's collection Gosaintan: Kami no za (ゴサインタン: 神の座), published in 1996 by Futabasha, won the 10th Yamamoto Shūgorō Prize. The title novella Gosaintan (ゴサインタン) combines multiple genres in a story about a woman from Nepal whose arranged marriage to a Japanese farmer leads to confrontations with her husband's mother, her own elevation as an object of religious worship, her husband's subsequent financial ruin, and ultimately a new life in Nepal with more personal freedom but much worse conditions. Science fiction critic Mari Kotani has described Gosaintan as a story that "reexamines the true nature of romance" but also "openly exposes Japan's stance toward Nepal".

A few months later, Shinoda's book Onnatachi no jihādo (女たちのジハード, Women's Jihad), published by Shueisha, won the 117th Naoki Prize. Onnatachi no jihādo follows the individual stories of five women employees experiencing harassment at an insurance company, focusing on the difficulties they have in a male-dominated society. In 1998 the book was adapted for television by NHK as a 2-episode special titled Onnatachi no seisen (女たちの聖戦, Women's Holy War).

After her Naoki Prize success, several more of Shinoda's works were adapted for television. In 1998 Shinoda's story Harumonia (ハルモニア, Harmonia), a horror story about a cellist whose attempts to help a girl with a brain disease communicate through music lead to her falling in love with him and using previously unknown paranormal powers to hurt other people in his life, was published as a book and adapted by Nippon TV into a television drama starring Koichi Domoto, Miki Nakatani, and Akiko Yada. Her 2000 novel Hyakunen no koi (百年の恋, One Hundred Years of Love), about the problems experienced by a married couple with vastly different personal incomes, was adapted into a 2003 NHK drama. Her 1995 horror novel Natsu no saiyaku (夏の災厄, Summer Calamity), about a pandemic that strikes a town outside Tokyo, was adapted into a 2006 Nippon TV special program.

Shinoda's 2-volume work Kasō girei (仮想儀礼, False Rites) was published by Shinchosha in 2008. Kasō girei tells the story of two men who start to write a role-playing game, decide instead to use the game as the basis for a new religious movement, gain enough adherents to achieve financial success, then find themselves displaced from the religious organization by women followers. In 2009 Kasō girei received the 22nd Shibata Renzaburo Prize. Two years later Shinoda received the 61st MEXT Award in the Literature category from the Japanese government's Agency for Cultural Affairs for her collection Sutābato Māteru (スターバト・マーテル, Stabat Mater).

In 2014 Kadokawa published Shinoda's novel Indo kurisutaru (インドクリスタル, India Crystal), the story of a Japanese businessman whose efforts to import special crystals needed for electronics manufacturing lead him to a small village in India, where he becomes involved with a local prostitute with exceptional cognitive powers, discovers a scheme to control uranium deposits, and almost dies in an anti-government uprising. Shinoda visited small Indian villages for details of setting and character, but based the fictitious Indian crystal trade in the novel on Japan's trade with Brazil and Australia. The book won the 10th Chuo Koron Literary Prize.

An English version of her story "The Long-rumored Food Crisis", which The Japan Times called "a chilling account of moral breakdown after the Big One levels Tokyo", was published in the 2015 collection Hanzai Japan.

== Recognition and honors ==
- 1990: 3rd Shōsetsu Subaru Literary Prize for Newcomers
- 1997: 10th Yamamoto Shūgorō Prize
- 1997: 117th Naoki Prize (1997上)
- 2009: 22nd Shibata Renzaburo Prize
- 2011: 61st MEXT Award in Literature
- 2015: 10th Chuo Koron Literary Prize
- 2020: Order of the Rising Sun, Gold Rays with Rosette (勲四等旭日小綬章)

== Television adaptations ==
- 1998: Onnatachi no seisen (女達の聖戦, Women's Holy War), NHK adaptation of Onnatachi no jihādo
- 1998: Harumonia (ハルモニア, Harmonia), Nippon TV
- 2003: Hyakunen no koi (百年の恋, One Hundred Years of Love), NHK
- 2006: Uirusu panikku 2006 natsu: machi wa kansen shita (ウィルスパニック2006夏〜街は感染した〜, Virus Panic Summer 2006: The Streets are Infected), Nippon TV adaptation of Natsu no saiyaku

== Bibliography ==
=== Selected works in Japanese ===
- Kinu no hen'yō (絹の変容, The Transformation of Silk), Shueisha, 1991, ISBN 9784087727746
- Natsu no saiyaku (夏の災厄, Summer Calamity), Mainichi Shimbun, 1995, ISBN 9784620105222
- Gosaintan: Kami no za (ゴサインタン: 神の座), Futabasha, 1996, ISBN 9784575232660
- Onnatachi no jihādo (女たちのジハード, Women's Jihad), Shueisha, 1997, ISBN 9784087742398
- Harumonia (ハルモニア, Harmonia), Magajinhausu, 1998, ISBN 9784838708383
- Hyakunen no koi (百年の恋, One Hundred Years of Love), 2000, Asahi Shimbun, ISBN 9784022575579
- Kasō girei (仮想儀礼, False Rites), Shinchosha, 2008, ISBN 9784103133612 (vol. 1), ISBN 9784103133629 (vol. 2)
- Sutābato Māteru (スターバト・マーテル, Stabat Mater), Kobunsha, 2010, ISBN 9784334926977
- Indo kurisutaru (インドクリスタル, India Crystal), Kadokawa, 2014, ISBN 9784041013526

=== Selected work in English translation ===
- "The Long-rumored Food Crisis", translated by Jim Hubbert, Hanzai Japan, 2015

== See also ==
- List of Japanese women writers
