= Hard Romantic-er =

- Directed by: Gu Su Yeon
- Starring: Shota Matsuda; Kento Nagayama; Yoko Maki; Dai Watanabe; Shido Nakamura
- Release dates: October 26, 2011 (Tokyo International Film Festival); November 26, 2011 (Japan)
- Country: Japan
- Language: Japanese

Hard Romantic-er (ハードロマンチッカー) is a 2011 Japanese film directed by Gu Su Yeon.

== Cast ==
- Shota Matsuda as Gu
- Kento Nagayama as Tatsu
- Kaname Endo as Park
- Motoki Ochiai as Park Little Brother
- Yuriko Ono as Mieko
- Tokio Emoto as Masaru
- Yoko Maki as Yakuza Wife
- Sei Ashina as Natsuko
- Nobuaki Kaneko as Takashi
- Jung-myung Bae as Kang
- Yuma Ishigaki as Lee
- Gouta Watabe as Yasuda
- Naoki Kawano as Kaneko
- Kuroudo Maki as Shoji
- Dai Watanabe as Masa
- Yuya Endo as Kim
- Atsuro Watabe as Fujita
- Hakuryu as Yakuza Lieutenant
- Shido Nakamura as Takagi
- Keiko Awaji as Gu Grandmother
