= 2027 in Japan =

- Decades: 2000s; 2010s; 2020s; 2030s
- See also: Other events of 2027: History of Japan; Timeline; Years

Events in the year 2027 in Japan.

== Events ==
=== Predicted and scheduled ===
- February – Agency for Cultural Affairs is scheduled to send a letter of recommendation for registration of Hikone Castle as an UNESCO World Heritage Site.
- February 7 – 2027 Aichi gubernatorial election will be held.
- March 19–September 26 – International Horticultural Expo 2027
- April 1 – Kushiro wetlands megasolar issue: Subsidy for new large-scale solar power projects is scheduled to be halted.

== Arts and entertainment ==
- 2027 in anime
- List of Japanese films of 2027

== Sports ==
- July 1–10 – 2027 World Lacrosse Men's Championship.
- April 11 – 2027 Japanese Grand Prix.
- July 24–25 – 2027 Tokyo ePrix.
- October 17 – 2027 Japanese motorcycle Grand Prix.

== See also ==
=== Country overviews ===
- Japan
- History of Japan
- Outline of Japan
- Government of Japan
- Politics of Japan
- Years in Japan
- Timeline of Japanese history

=== Related timelines for current period ===
- 2027
- 2020s
- 2020s in political history
