= Koichi Kato (politician, born 1964) =

Japanese politician

- 加藤 公一
- Official portrait, 2010

Member of the House of Representatives
- In office 25 June 2000 – 16 November 2012
- Preceded by: Yuriko Ono
- Succeeded by: Seiji Kihara
- Constituency: Tokyo 20th (2000–2005); Tokyo PR (2005–2009); Tokyo 20th (2009–2012)

Personal details
- Born: 6 April 1964 (age 62) Chiyoda, Tokyo, Japan
- Party: Democratic
- Education: Sophia University

Koichi Kato (加藤 公一, Katō Kōichi; born 6 April 1964) is a Japanese politician from Tokyo and a member of the Democratic Party of Japan. A native of Chiyoda, Tokyo and graduate of Sophia University, he worked at Recruit from 1988 to 1996. Kato was elected to the House of Representatives for the first time in 2000 and served until 2012.
