= In My Father's Room =

- Japanese: 無用の人
- Directed by: Maha Harada
- Screenplay by: Maha Harada
- Based on: "An Unnecessary Man" by Maha Harada
- Starring: Yū Aoi; Issey Ogata; Eita Nagayama; Eri Watanabe
- Cinematography: Yoshio Kitagawa
- Edited by: Azusa Yamazaki
- Music by: Mamiko Hirai
- Distributed by: Bitters End
- Release dates: 21 September 2026 (Zinemaldia); January 2027 (Japan)
- Country: Japan
- Language: Japanese

In My Father's Room (Japanese: 無用の人) is a 2026 Japanese drama film directed by Maha Harada (in her directorial debut) based on her own short story "An Unnecessary Man". It stars Yū Aoi, Issey Ogata, Eita Nagayama, and Eri Watanabe.

It had its world premiere at the 74th San Sebastián International Film Festival on 21 September 2026.

== Plot ==
The plot follows the plight of Satomi, an art museum curator, who unspools information about the last days of her father.

== Cast ==
- Yū Aoi
- Issey Ogata
- Eita Nagayama
- Eri Watanabe

== Release ==
Bitters End acquired international sales rights as well as Japanese distribution rights. The film premiered at the 74th San Sebastián International Film Festival on 21 September 2026. It was also programmed at the 31st Busan International Film Festival. It is scheduled to be released theatrically in Japan in January 2027.

== Reception ==
Matthew Joseph Jenner of International Cinephile Society rated the film 4 out of 5 stars, declaring it "a poetic ode to family and the often challenging elements that bind us together".

Jonathan Romney of ScreenDaily assessed that the film proves to be "ultimately more an objet d’art of preciousness than depth".

Enric Albero of El Cultural deemed the film to be "a beautiful ode to poetry" as well as a celebration of transience, extolling "the precision with which Harada shapes a story that conceals a process of (self-)discovery".

== Accolades ==
Year	Award	Category	Nominee(s)	Result	Ref.
2026	74th San Sebastián International Film Festival	FIPRESCI Award		Won	

== See also ==
- List of Japanese films of 2027
