= The Cowards Who Looked to the Sky =

- DVD cover art

Japanese name
- Kanji: ふがいない僕は空を見た
Transcriptions
- Revised Hepburn: Fugainai Boku wa Sora wo Mita
- Directed by: Yuki Tanada
- Written by: Misumi Kubo; Kosuke Mukai
- Produced by: Gen Sato; Toshiki Kimura
- Starring: Kento Nagayama; Tomoko Tabata; Masataka Kubota; Takahiro Miura
- Cinematography: Ryo Otsuka
- Music by: Shūhei Kamimura
- Distributed by: Tokyo Theatres
- Release date: 17 November 2012 (Japan)
- Running time: 142 minutes
- Country: Japan
- Language: Japanese

The Cowards Who Looked to the Sky (Japanese: ふがいない僕は空を見た, Hepburn: Fugainai Boku wa Sora wo Mita) is a 2012 Japanese drama film adaptation of a novel of the same name written by Misumi Kubo. It was released in Japan on 17 November 2012. The film stars Kento Nagayama as Takumi Saito, the lead hero; Tomoko Tabata as Satomi Okamoto (Anzu), the lead heroine; Masataka Kubota as Ryota Fukuda; and Takahiro Miura as Yoshifumi Taoka. The film was directed by Yuki Tanada.

== Reception ==
Tomoko Tabata won the 67th Mainichi Film Award for Best Actress for her role in the film.
