= Seiichiro Shimizu =

Japanese politician

- 清水 清一朗

Member of the House of Representatives
- In office 12 September 2005 – 21 July 2009
- Constituency: Tokyo PR

Member of the Tokyo Metropolitan Assembly
- In office 23 July 1993 – 8 October 1996
- Constituency: Kitatama 1st

Personal details
- Born: 23 February 1947 (age 79) Higashimurayama, Tokyo, Japan
- Party: Liberal Democratic
- Relatives: Kiyoshi Ozawa (father-in-law)
- Education: Nihon University

Seiichiro Shimizu (清水 清一朗, Shimizu Seiichirō; born 23 April 1947) is a Japanese politician of the Liberal Democratic Party, a member of the House of Representatives in the Diet (national legislature).

== Early life ==
Shimizu is a native of Higashimurayama, Tokyo and a graduate of Nihon University.

== Political career ==
He served in the assembly of Tokyo from 1993.

He was elected to the House of Representatives for the first time in 2005 after an unsuccessful run in 2003.
