= Maha Harada =

Japanese novelist

- 原田 マハ
- Born: 1962 (age 63–64); Kodaira, Tokyo, Japan
- Education: Kwansei Gakuin University
- Alma mater: Waseda University
- Occupation: Writer
- Writing career
- Language: Japanese
- Genres: Novel; historical fiction; thriller; biographical novel
- Notable works: Kafū o machiwabite; Rakuen no kanvasu; Master Leach
- Notable awards: Japan Love Story Grand Prize; Yamamoto Shūgorō Prize; Nitta Jiro Literature Prize
- Website: www.haradamaha.com

Maha Harada (原田 マハ, Harada Maha; born 1962) is a Japanese writer and filmmaker. She has won the Japan Love Story Grand Prize, the Yamamoto Shūgorō Prize, and the Nitta Jiro Literature Prize, she has been nominated multiple times for the Naoki Prize, and several of her novels have been adapted for film and television.

== Early life and education ==
Harada was born in 1962 in Kodaira, Tokyo, Japan. Her father, a seller of art books and encyclopedias, moved the family to Okayama, where Harada experienced bullying from her school classmates and started writing stories to combat her isolation. She graduated from high school in Okayama and entered Kwansei Gakuin University to study German literature, but later changed her focus and graduated with a degree in Japanese literature. After graduation she worked as a graphic designer and married her husband, then worked in a series of art direction and curation jobs, including five years at the Japanese conglomerate Itochu, while also attending graduate school in art history at Waseda University. Harada subsequently worked as an art curator for the Mori Art Museum, including a collaboration with the Museum of Modern Art, but left in 2002 to work as a freelance art curator.

== Career ==
Harada made her literary debut in her early 40s. Her first novel, Kafū o machiwabite (カフーを待ちわびて, Waiting for Good News), won the inaugural Japan Love Story Grand Prize, awarded to a newcomer writing in the love story genre, and was published in 2006 by Takarajimasha, the prize's sponsor. It sold over 370,000 copies. The book was later adapted into a 2009 Yu Nakai film of the same name starring Maiko and Tetsuji Tamayama.

After her debut Harada wrote several more novels that were subsequently adapted for film and television. Her 2007 novel Ippunkan dake (一分間だけ, Only a Moment) was later adapted into 2014 film of the same name, made in Taiwan and released nationwide in Japan. Her 2010 novel Honjitsu wa ohigara mo yoku (本日は、お日柄もよく, Today is a Good Day), about a woman whose romantic setbacks lead her to success as a speechwriter, was later adapted into the 2017 Wowow TV drama starring Manami Higa and Kyoko Hasegawa. Her 2010 cell phone novel Runway Beat (ランウェイ・ビート, Ran'uei bīto), about teenagers who organize a fashion show, was adapted into the 2011 Kentaro Otani film Runway Beat starring Nanami Sakuraba and Mirei Kiritani. Her 2011 novel Dērē gāruzu (でーれーガールズ, Fantastic Girls), about a broken friendship between two high school girls living in Okayama in 1980 who meet again thirty years later, was later adapted into a 2015 Akiko Ohku film starring Rika Adachi and Mio Yūki.

In 2012 Shinchosha published Harada's novel Rakuen no kanvasu (楽園のカンヴァス, Painting of Paradise), a story about a disgraced art curator asked to help with negotiations for a painting whose provenance she previously investigated. Rakuen no kanvasu won the 25th Yamamoto Shūgorō Prize. Later that year the book was nominated for the 147th Naoki Prize, but the prize went to Mizuki Tsujimura.

Harada was nominated twice more for the Naoki Prize without winning. In 2013 Harada's novel Jiveruni no shokutaku (ジヴェルニーの食卓, Dinner Tables of Giverny), a work of historical fiction that tells stories about French painters Claude Monet, Henri Matisse, Edgar Degas, and Paul Cézanne from the perspective of women in their lives, was nominated for the 149th Naoki Prize. Her 2016 suspense novel Anmaku no Guernica (暗幕のゲルニカ, Guernica Under Cover), a thriller about the return of Picasso's Guernica to the Museum of Modern Art that combines a fictionalized historical account of French photographer Dora Maar with an entirely fictional narrative about an art curator in New York City following the September 11 attacks, was nominated for the 155th Naoki Prize.

In 2017 Harada won the 36th Nitta Jiro Literature Prize for her 2016 novel Rīchi sensei (リーチ先生, Master Leach), a work of historical fiction in which the main character, a bilingual orphaned Japanese teenage boy, becomes an accomplished potter under the tutelage of British ceramic artist Bernard Leach. In 2018 her book Sweet Home (スイート・ホーム, Suīto hōmu), a collection of linked stories about a neighborhood pastry shop, was published by Popurasha. The following year she received her fourth Naoki Prize nomination, for her novel Utsukushii orokamonotachi no taburō (美しき愚かものたちのタブロー).

In 2026, Harada made her feature film directorial debut, In My Father's Room, an adaptation of her own short story, "An Unnecessary Man". The film premiered in competition at the 74th San Sebastián International Film Festival before continuing to the 31st Busan International Film Festival.

== Personal life ==
Harada's brother is the novelist Munenori Harada.

== Recognition ==
- 2005: 1st Japan Love Story Grand Prize
- 2012: 25th Yamamoto Shūgorō Prize
- 2017: 36th Nitta Jiro Literature Prize

== Film and other adaptations ==
=== Film ===
- Kafū o machiwabite (カフーを待ちわびて, Waiting for Good News), 2007
- Runway Beat (ランウェイ・ビート), 2011
- Ippunkan dake (一分間だけ, One Minute More), 2014
- Dērē gāruzu (でーれーガールズ, Fantastic Girls), 2015
- Muyō no hito (無用の人, In My Father's Room), 2026

=== Television ===
- Honjitsu wa ohigara mo yoku (本日は、お日柄もよく, Today is a Good Day), Wowow, 2017

== Selected works ==
- Kafū o machiwabite (カフーを待ちわびて, Waiting for Good News), Takarajimasha, 2006, ISBN 9784796652124
- Ippunkan dake (一分間だけ, Only a Moment), Takarajimasha, 2007, ISBN 9784796657747
- Runway Beat (ランウェイ・ビート, Ran'uei bīto), Takarajimasha, 2010, ISBN 9784796678346
- Honjitsu wa ohigara mo yoku (本日は、お日柄もよく, Today is a Good Day), Tokumashoten, 2010, ISBN 9784198629854
- Dērē gāruzu (でーれーガールズ, Fantastic Girls), Shōdensha, 2011, ISBN 9784396633714
- Rakuen no kanvasu (楽園のカンヴァス, Painting of Paradise), Shinchosha, 2012, ISBN 9784103317517
- Jiveruni no shokutaku (ジヴェルニーの食卓, Dinner Tables of Giverny), Shueisha, 2013, ISBN 9784087715057
- Anmaku no Guernica (暗幕のゲルニカ, Guernica Under Cover), Shinchosha, 2016, ISBN 9784103317524
- Rīchi sensei (リーチ先生, Master Leach), Shueisha, 2016, ISBN 9784087710113
- Sweet Home (スイート・ホーム, Suīto hōmu), Popurasha, 2018, ISBN 9784591156681
- Utsukushii orokamonotachi no taburō (美しき愚かものたちのタブロー), Bungeishunjū, 2019
