= Kento Nagayama =

Japanese actor (born 1989)

- Born: 7 March 1989 (age 37); Itabashi, Tokyo, Japan
- Occupation: Actor
- Years active: 2008–present
- Relatives: Eita Nagayama (brother); Kaela Kimura (sister-in-law)

Kento Nagayama (永山 絢斗, Nagayama Kento; born 7 March 1989), is a Japanese actor. He has appeared in more than 30 films since 2008. Nagayama has two elder brothers who are also actors: Tatsuya and Eita Nagayama.

== Personal life ==
On 17 May 2016, Nagayama and actress Hikari Mitsushima briefly dated, which was confirmed by both of their respective agencies.

=== Possession of illegal substances and arrest ===
On 16 June 2023, he was arrested for suspicion of violating the Cannabis Control Law in his apartment in Meguro. According to early reports, investigators from the Metropolitan Police Department stepped into his residence on 15 June, concluding with Nagayama's arrest after midnight on the 16th for possession of marijuana.

== Filmography ==
=== Film ===
Year	Title	Role	Notes	Ref
2009	Tsumitoka batsutoka			
2011	Hard Romantic-er			
2012	The Cowards Who Looked to the Sky		Lead role	
2013	See You Tomorrow, Everyone			
2013	Shield of Straw			
2014	Crows Explode			
2014	Clover	Haruki Hino		
2016	Sanada 10 Braves	Nezu Jinpachi		
2017	Ernesto	Mori		
2018	The Miracle of Crybaby Shottan			
2022	Love Like the Falling Petals			
2022	The Pass: Last Days of the Samurai	Matsuzō		
2022	Double	Yuujin		
2022	Love Life	Jirō		
2022	A Winter Rose			
2023	In Love and Deep Water	Shintarō Ibuki		
2023	#Manhole	Kase		
2023	Tokyo Revengers 2: Bloody Halloween Part 1	Keisuke Baji		
2023	Tokyo Revengers 2: Bloody Halloween Part 2	Keisuke Baji		

=== Television ===
Year	Title	Role	Notes	Ref
2016	Beppinsan	Norio Tanaka	Asadora	
2019	Idaten	Genzaburō Noguchi	Taiga drama	
2019	Kuro tokage	Kogorô Akechi	TV movie	
2021	Shikatanakatta to Iute wa Ikan no desu		TV movie	
2024	Invisible	Kirihito		
