= Kaho Nakayama (writer) =

Japanese novelist

Kaho Nakayama (Japanese: 中山 可穂, born 1960) is a Japanese writer. Her debut novel, The Stoop-Shouldered Prince (猫背の王子, Nekoze no Ouji), was published in 1993, and her subsequent novels have won and been nominated for a number of Japanese literary awards including the Yamamoto Shūgorō Prize. In the 2015 edition of the Routledge Handbook of Sexuality Studies in East Asia, she was identified as "Japan's only contemporary self-identified lesbian novelist". Her short story, "Sparkling Rain", was the titular short story of Barbara Summerhawk's anthology of queer Japanese women writers, Sparkling Rain: and other fiction from Japan of women who love women. This short story, and a selection from her novel Sentimental Education, translated by Allison Markin Powell, are her only works to have been translated into English.

== Life and works ==
Nakayama was born in Nagoya in 1960 and graduated from the Faculty of Education at Waseda University's Department of English. Between graduation and the publication of her first novel, she directed a theatrical troupe, including acting, writing, and directing. For five years, to get through the void after quitting acting, she worked in her thirties as an office worker while beginning to write her first novel.

In 1993, after winning a short story prize from Tokyo FM, Magazine House published her debut novel, The Stoop-Shouldered Prince. Her 1995 novel, Angel Bones (天使の骨, Tenshi no Hone) won the Asahi New Writers' Literary Award, and her 2001 novel, To the Depths of a White Rose (白い薔薇の淵まで, Shiroi Bara no Fuchi Made) was awarded the Yamamoto Shūgorō Prize.

=== Lesbian and homosexual themes ===
Nakayama's works, such as her 2000 novel Sentimental Education (感情教育, sharing a title with Gustav Flaubert's novel), are known for their frequent motifs of heartrending lesbian love and relationships. To the Depths of a White Rose and Sentimental Education were both published at the end of what has been described as Japan's 'gay boom', spanning the late 1980s and 1990s, where novels such as To the Depths of a White Rose and Chiya Fujino's A Promise for Summer, both won major Japanese literary awards. The title of her novel Love-Suicide in Marrakesh (マラケシュ心中, Marakeshu shinju) referenced the trope of love-suicide seen in 17th century Japanese literature, while the content more evoked the contemporary expressions and representations of same-sex female love and relationships seen in manga and anime.

In the early period of her career, her body of work was known for its radical portrayal of sex and gender, together with full and nuanced expressions of lesbianism. With the 2006 publication of Kehheru (ケッヘル), Nakayama's work expanded into depictions of love and relationships between gay men as well as heterosexuals, parents, and children. Despite this, she strongly disliked being called a 'lesbian writer' by the public, striving to continue publishing fleshed-out novels that keenly examined the foundational nature of human existence.

== Works ==
- The Stoop-Shouldered Prince (猫背の王子, Nekoze no ouji), 1993
- Angel Bones (天使の骨, Tenshi no hone), 1995
- La Sagrada Familia (サグラダファミリア : 聖家族, Sagurada famiria : seikazoku), 1998
- Sentimental Education (感情教育, Kanjo kyōiku), 2000
- Cut to the Quick (深爪, Fukadzume), 2000
- To the Depths of a White Rose (白い薔薇の淵まで, Shiroi Bara no Fuchi Made), 2001
- The Flower Temple (花伽藍 Hana-garan), 2002
- Love-Suicide in Marrakesh (マラケシュ心中, Marakeshu shinju), 2002
- Gigolo (ジゴロ, Jigoro), 2003
- Kehheru (ケッヘル), 2006
- The Blind Young Man (弱法師, Yoroboshi, likely a reference to the legend of Shuntokumaru and the 1960 Yukio Mishima Noh play of the same name), 2007
- Saigon Tango Cafe (サイゴン・タンゴ・カフェ, Saigon・Tango・Kafe), 2008
- Elegy (悲歌, Hika), 2009
- The Cat Who Writes Novels (小說を書く猫, Shōsetsu o kaku neko), 2011
- The Country of Love (愛の国, Ai no kuni) 2014
- Male Roles (男役, Otokoyaku), 2015
- Daughter Roles (娘役, Musumeyaku), 2016
- Zero Hour (ゼロ・アワー, Zero・awā), 2017
- Silver Bridge (銀橋, Ginkyō), 2018
