= Eri Watanabe =

Japanese actress (born 1955)

- Born: Eriko Watanabe (渡辺えり子); January 5, 1955 (age 71); Yamagata, Japan
- Other name: Eriko Watanabe
- Occupation: Actress
- Years active: 1978–present

Eri Watanabe (渡辺 えり, Watanabe Eri), who was previously known as Eriko Watanabe (渡辺 えり子, Eriko Watanabe), is a Japanese actress. She won the award for Best Supporting Actress at the 21st Hochi Film Awards for Shall We Dance?.

== Filmography ==
=== Films ===
- Comic Magazine (1986)
- Crest of Betrayal (1994)
- Shall We Dance? (1996)
- Swing Girls (2004), Sanae Suzuki
- Milk White (2004)
- Memories of Tomorrow (2006)
- Ichi (2008)
- Lady Maiko (2014)
- My Dad and Mr. Ito (2016)
- Survival Family (2017)
- Mary and the Witch's Flower (2017), Banks (voice)
- Talking the Pictures (2019)
- Tezuka's Barbara (2019)
- Romance Doll (2019)
- Labyrinth of Cinema (2020)
- Disease of Family (2026)
- In My Father's Room (2027)

=== Television ===
- Oshin (1983)
- Amachan (2013)

=== Dubbing ===
- Lilo & Stitch (2025), Tūtū
