= Yuriko Ono =

Japanese actress (born 1989)

- 小野 ゆり子
- Born: 4 August 1989 (age 36); Tokyo, Japan
- Occupation: Actress
- Years active: 2008–present
- Agent: Flying Box
- Height: 1.67 m (5 ft 6 in)
- Spouse: Nao Ōmori (m. 2012)
- Children: 1
- Relatives: Akaji Maro (father-in-law); Tatsushi Ōmori (brother-in-law)

Yuriko Ono (小野 ゆり子, Ono Yuriko; born 4 August 1989, in Tokyo, Japan) is a Japanese actress. She is represented with Flying Box.

== Biography ==
Ono was scouted by her former agency during elementary school, and during her first year of junior high school she appeared in a television advertisement for the Coca-Cola Company's Fanta called "3-nen S-gumi: Kurohige-sensei", but when her original office was subsequently closed, her activities were paused. Before graduating from junior high school she was invited by a model who was her mother's friend, and later came back to the entertainment industry.

Ono moved to Now Fashion Agency in 2008, and started working as a model. She later moved to its sister company in 2009, and started working as an actress. This broadens Ono's range of activities in the theatre, films and television dramas.

In 2009, she was selected as one of the winners of the Actor's Seminar Awards Audition, produced by the Japan Film and Television Producer Association, among sixty applicants.

On 14 March 2012, Ono announced that she married actor Nao Ōmori.

In 2013, she made her first television drama appearance in the Fuji Television series Saikou no Rikon. In 2014, Ono made her first leading drama role in Tenchu: Yami no Shioki Hito on the same network.

Her special skill is baton twirling. Ono's hobbies are reading, watching films and dancing.

== Filmography ==
=== Stage ===
Year	Title	Role	Ref.
2009	Todoroki no Sanmyaku		
2010	Minami e		
2011	Hanshin		
2012	Zetchō Macbeth		
2013	Notes from Underground		
2014	Pan-ya Bunroku no Shian: Zoku Kunio Kishida Hitomakugeki Collection		
2016	Katei-nai Shissō	Kasumi	

=== TV series ===
Year	Title	Role	Network	Notes	Ref.
2013	Saikou no Rikon	Chihiro Arimura	Fuji TV		
2013	Kasuteira	Keiko-sensei	NHK BS Premium		
2013	Keiji no Manazashi	Ryoko Adachi	TBS		
2014	Tenchu: Yami no Shioki Hito	Sana	Fuji TV	Lead role	
2014	Last Doctor: Kansatsu-i Akita no Kenshi Hōkoku	Ame	TV Tokyo	Episode 2	
2014	Dakara Kōya	Hyakuoto Sakurada	NHK BS Premium		
2014	Yube no Curry, Ashita no Pan	Rieko Yanagida	NHK BS Premium		
2014	Tokyo ni Olympic o Yonda Otoko	Miyako "Grace" Wada	Fuji TV		
2015	Onnamichi	Yumi Matsuo	NHK BS Premium		
2015	Kozure Shin Hyōe	Ono	NHK BS Premium	Episode 3	
2016	Higanbana: Keishichō Sōsa Nana-ka	Ayaka Harukawa	NTV	Episode 1	
2016	Shūgorō Yamamoto Ninjō Jidaigeki	Nobu Uemura	BS Japan	Episode 12	
2016	Ieuru Onna	Reona	NTV	Episode 6	
2016	Aibō Season 15	Hatsue Kurusu	TV Asahi	Episode 1	
2017	Kanjō 8-gōsen	Rina	Fuji TV Two	Lead role	
2021	Awaiting Kirin	Lady Tsukiyama	NHK	Taiga drama	

=== Films ===
Year	Title	Role	Ref.
2011	Looking for a True Fiancee		
2011	Hard Romantic-er	Mieko Nakamura	
2022	How to Find Happiness	Mariko	

=== Short films ===
Year	Title	Role	Notes	Ref.
2009	Jitensha no Onna		Lead role	
2009	Kekkon-gaku Nyūmon: Renai			
2010	Kekkon-gaku Nyūmon: Shinkon			
2010	Underwear Affair	Asako (teenager)		
2010	Technicolor			
2011	Nukunuku no Ki			

=== Advertisements ===
Year	Title
2004	Coca-Cola Fanta "3-nen S-gumi Kurohige Sensei"
	MOS Burger Nanchoriso
2008	Universal Music Ai no uta 2
2009	Gakkō Hōjin Mode Gakuen Hal "Sōzō Kaika"
2012	Recruit Kankoshi Tenshoku Partner Nurse Full
2013	Chifure Corporation Bihaku Series W "Double no Bihaku"
2013	Suntory Single Malt Whiskey Shirasu
2014	Asahi Kasei Saran

=== Mobile dramas ===
Year	Title	Website
2010	Shitte wa Ikenai Kowai Hanashi: Mayonaka no Mail	BeeTV

=== Magazines ===
Title	Publisher
melon	Shodensha
Candy	Hakusensha
Hyakunichisō	
