= Toru Miyamoto (politician) =

Japanese politician

- 宮本 徹
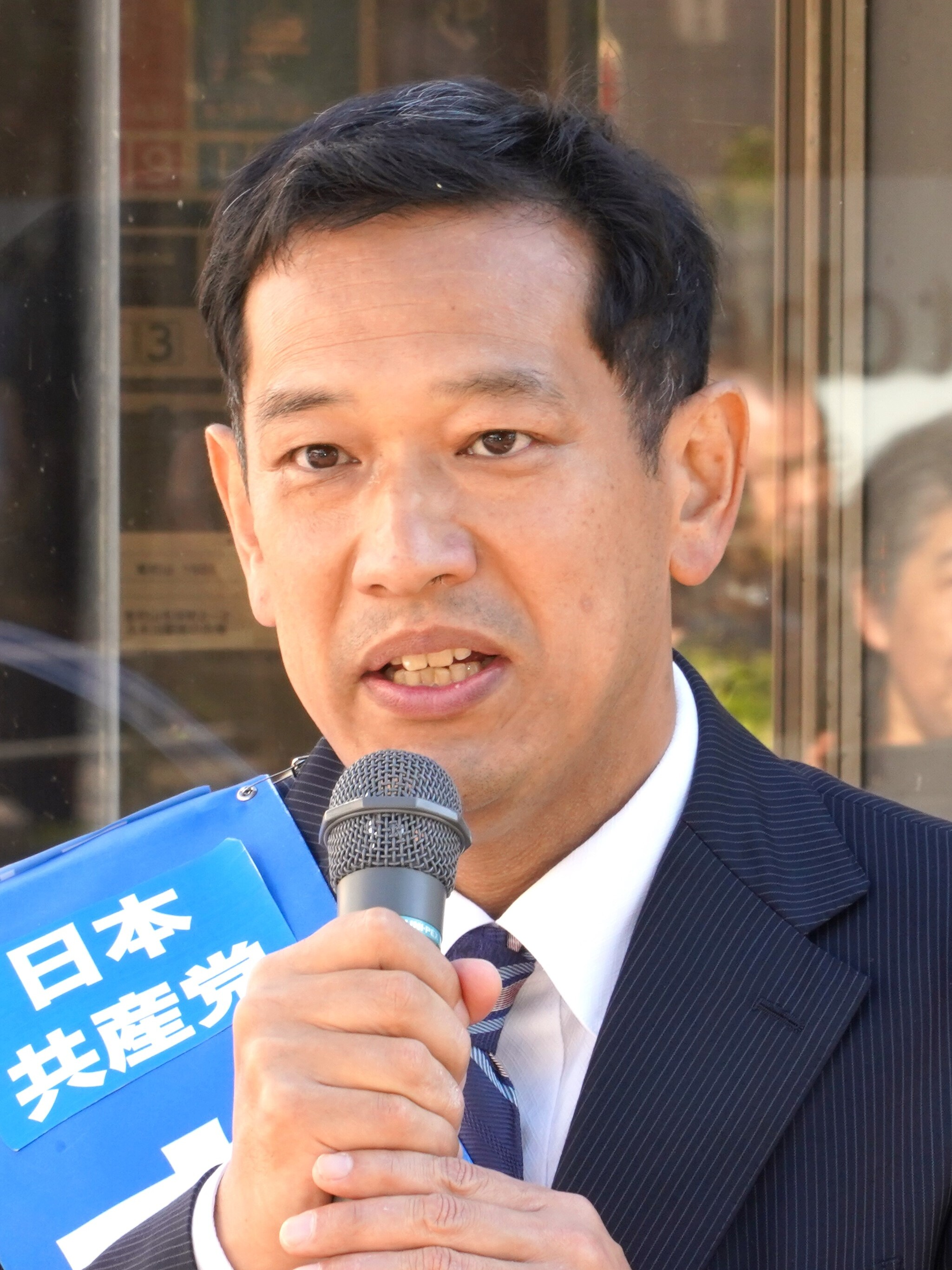
- Miyamoto in 2024

Member of the House of Representatives
- In office 19 December 2014 – 9 October 2024
- Constituency: Tokyo PR

Personal details
- Born: 22 January 1971 (age 55) Miki, Hyōgo, Japan
- Party: Communist
- Education: University of Tokyo

Tōru Miyamoto (宮本 徹, Miyamoto Tōru; born 22 January 1972) is a member of the Japanese Communist Party who served in the House of Representatives as a representative of the Tokyo proportional representation block for 3 terms between 2014 and 2024. Miyamoto was born in Miki City, Hyogo Prefecture.

== Education and early party career ==
He entered into the University of Tokyo in 1991, and graduated from the Faculty of Education (which he had entered in his 3rd year. After graduating, Miyamoto began working for the Japanese Communist Party, holding positions including : Chairman of the Musashino Mitaka District Committee, Vice Chairman of the Tokyo Metropolitan Committee, and Deputy Head of the Party Policy Committee.

== Election to office and subsequent political posts ==
Miyamoto’s first election that he ran in was 2005 [44th general election for the House of Representatives] in Tokyo’s 18th ward, but lost the seat to Kan Naoto of the DPJ. He ran in the 2012 [46th general] election for the Tokyo PR block, but lost. He ran again in the subsequent 2014 [47th] election and won a seat for the first time. In the 2017 [48th] election, there were plenty of candidates running for Tokyo’s wards and the PR block, but since Miyamoto was listed 2nd for the PR block, he was elected for a second term under proportional restoration. Although he was defeated again in the 2021 [49th] election, he was the sole second place for the Tokyo PR block and got re-elected through proportional revival. He continued to hold a seat for the JCP in the LH Tokyo PR block, and was a member of the Budget Committee and the Health, Labor, & Welfare Committee.

== Policy positions and views ==
Miyamoto supports same-sex marriage, supports postponing the consumption tax, supports free education daycare/kindergarten through university [which is his main goal/position], supports strengthening taxes on the wealthy, supports lowering voting age, supports the abolishment of nuclear power, supports allowing people to retain/use their maiden names after marriage if they choose, supports the idea that there are many different types of families, including single-parent families and DINKS, and supports adherence to the 3 non-nuclear principles. Miyamoto neither agrees nor disagrees with the concept that for the time being, fiscal stimulus should be used to stimulate the economy, rather than suppressing spending to rebuild the economy in Japan nor to promoting the acceptance of foreign workers. Miyamoto opposes Abenomics, opposes the enactment of security related bills [Abe cabinet], opposes initiatives to address the NK issue [Abe cabinet], opposes the revision of the Organized Crime Punishment Act (Conspiracy Act) [Abe cabinet], opposes response to the Moritomo Gakuen/Kake Gakuen issue [Abe cabinet], opposes raising the consumption tax higher than 10% in the long term, opposes restricting privacy and individual rights in the name of public safety/saying that doing so is natural, opposes the PM visiting Yasukuni shrine, opposes resuming operation of nuclear power plants that have passed the examination by the Nuclear Regulation Authority, opposes strengthening Japan’s defense power, opposes pre-emptive strike if an attack is expected from another country, and opposes the concept that pressure should be prioritized over dialogue with North Korea. The ‘If I had to say, closer to B’ questions were: ‘A. Prioritize improving economic competitiveness even if there are some social disparities. B. Prioritize narrowing disparities even if it means sacrificing economic competitiveness to some extent.’ and ‘A: The government bonds are being used up stably, so there is no need to worry about the budget deficit. B: The budget deficit is at a critical level, so government bond issuance should be suppressed.’

== Parliamentary activity and speeches ==
Miyamoto is an active force both within his party and within the House of Representatives. He has also spoken at public events, such as on 1 May [2024], he gave a speech on behalf of the JCP at the 95th Mitama May Day event held at Inokashira Park Nishizono Stadium. He is active in the House of Representatives chamber : on April 25, a plenary session was held on the treaty on Joint Development of Next-Generation Fighter Jets [the treaty with the UK and Italy, and the establishment of an IGO] was discussed. Miyamoto had some choice words on the topic : pointing out that in the past, the Diet had declared a complete ban on arms exports [part of the 1981 Three Principles of Arms Exports] in line with the constitution (and Article 9); He responded to the recent efforts of the Kishida administration to lift the 1981 ban (following the export of domestically-made weapons being authorized by a foreign company in Dec 2023), also citing the Constitution. Miyamoto called attention to this, saying : “How can a single cabinet meeting overturn national policy?” He stated that the agreement limits to countries that are signatories to agreements under the UN charter, and that the agreement contains the clause that the weapons must be used in accordance with the UN charter, but pointed out that countries like the US and UK [who led the Iraq War in violation of the UN charter] would still be included in the agreement. There is also an exception in the agreement in which the standard would not apply if there is no fighting within the territory of the country exporting the war. The US, which has started wars in Iraq and other countries, may fall under this exception. Miyamoto followed that point by stating that Japan should return to the previous arms embargo and called for the treaty to be scrapped.

Within the committee rooms specifically, Miyamoto has also been active. Lately, his key issue [within the Health, Labor, and Welfare committee] has been work-family life balance. On April 24, in the H/L/W Committee room, Miyamoto called for restrictions on work reassignments that involve relocation as balancing things like child/nursing care and work is difficult, forcing people to live single/alone. He pointed out that the recent ruling on transfer orders are “acceptable as long as the harms are not more burdenful than is usually tolerated.” On April 26, in the H/L/W Committee room, Miyamoto stated that termination of employment falls under the same conditions as dismissal, allowing for women in the workforce on fixed term employment to have peace of mind about carrying and birthing a child. The issue comes down to how while under the Equal Employment Opportunity Act the firing of a female employee who is either pregnant or within a year of birth is prohibited [with the blame/burden falling on the employer], fixed-term employees do not have the same protections [as the blame/burden is on the employee, and is only protected if proven what that the exact grounds for firing were the unfavorable treatment because of a pregnancy]. He brought up the fact that fixed-term employees are being fired as soon as announcing a pregnancy or trying to take a leave for childcare. He asked the committee, “Isn’t it necessary to revise the law to provide the same protections of dismissal to protect termination of employment?” He also pointed out that this phenomenon was affecting local government workers [a demographic overlooked in local government investigations on the topic], stating that there needs to be survey research into the amount of layoffs due to this reason, as well as the retention rates [and comparing this between employees and employee type]. On April 29, 2024, in the H/L/W Committee, Miyamoto raised/drew attention to the issue regarding childcare and nursing care.
