= Yuki Tanada =

Japanese film director and screenwriter (born 1975)

- Born: 12 August 1975 (age 50); Fukuoka Prefecture, Japan
- Occupations: Film director, screenwriter

Yuki Tanada (タナダユキ, Tanada Yuki; born 12 August 1975, in Fukuoka Prefecture) is a Japanese film director and screenwriter. Born in Kitakyushu, Tanada pursued theater in high school before entering the Image Forum Institute of the Moving Image to study filmmaking. Her newest work, My Broken Mariko, released on September 30, 2022 (Japan), is a work written and illustrated by Waka Hirako.

== Career ==
Born in Fukuoka Prefecture, Tanada pursued theater in high school before entering the Image Forum Institute of the Moving Image to study filmmaking. Her independently produced film Moru won the grand prize at the 2001 Pia Film Festival. Her next work, Takada Wataru: A Japanese Original, a documentary on a Japanese folk singer, was featured at the 2003 Tokyo International Film Festival. She won the Directors Guild of Japan New Directors Award for her 2008 film One Million Yen Girl. She has written the scripts for many of her films as well as contributed the script to Mika Ninagawa's Sakuran. She has also directed for television.

== Japanese female filmmaker ==
In the Japanese film industry, there is a big division between the huge, mega budget films and the small minor budgets films. This creates little to no space for the middle ground in the Japanese film industry. For Tanada, she represents more of the lower budget side, especially earlier in her career. She states that with a big budget film, you can get a really good PR, but her goal is to bring those low budget films in the industry up slightly more. The issue is that low budget films means no promotions and you have to create every single opportunity in order to promote. For One Million Yen Girl, even though it has a middle ground budget, the promotion for the film it is not enough to reach the people she wanted, which makes it seem like a low budget film. This is because the discrepancy in big budget compared to the low budget is so large that big budget films can promote and reach multiple countries and people at such a higher rate, which makes middle ground films seem like a low budget film. Tanada believes that is the biggest issue as the middle ground ceases to exist.

As a Japanese filmmaker. she noticed that in Japan, you can do anything you like in terms of profession. She states that those boundaries are gone these days. That being a good thing in the Japanese film industry compared to other film industries. Her vision for the future. more specifically in Japan, is the growth of internet platforms like Netflix. She talks about the Coen Brothers, who made the film Fargo.

== Feminism ==
Japanese female director, Yuki Tanada, looks towards defining gender role and space for women in her work. In her films she showcases many young, female protagonists to represent and rework women in film. Two of her most popular films Moon and Cherry (Tsuki to Cherī, 2004) and One Million Yen Girl (Hyakuman-en to nigamushi onna, 2008) has two female protagonist who retain narrative agency and manage ultimately to live their lives on their own terms. This in turn creates selfhood and individuality to these characters that want to fulfill a wishful life even though their actions are frequently problematic.

Looking at her debut film Moon and Cherry, a young university male Tadokoro, who after joining an erotic writing club, becomes involved with a girl named Mayumi. Tadokoro being a virgin falls in love with Mayumi and eventually gets involved with her sexually. Tadokoro doesn't know if he is being used for her sexual fantasies and begins to question Mayumi's intent. This control she has as a woman, especially with her body, is something that is very well highlighted throughout the film. It gives more attention to Tanada's agency to recognize individualistic values that woman carry whether it is with their career, body, mind, or life.

Her most popular film One Million Yen Girl is a concise attempt to negotiate a space for a girl to reflect on coming of age, a journey to adulthood (as she leaves home and jail), and more significantly to muliebrity and independence. The main character, Suzuko, before her migration away from home is constantly dragged by her problems with men; her imprisonment, comes after she angrily reacts after her potential male housemate kills her cat. This was because her housemate felt depression following a relationship break-up which led him to throw out the little kitten into the street. Her retaliation by throwing away all his possessions then lands her in jail, and she refuses to pose as the housemate’s girlfriend even when told by the police that this would result in a less severe penalty. She goes on a journey after her release from jail and finds revelation and self with the people she meets along the way. Her “great crime” if the opportunity was handed to us would be something we would all do and be guilty of. That relativity humanizes her to be a character that reaches a wider audience and speaks to a woman's determination. Her problems branching from multiple male figures in this film thrusts her determination to remain independent; to not be tied to a man, and be a strong, desired woman.

== Selected filmography ==
=== Film ===
- Moru (モル) (2001)
- Takada Wataru: A Japanese Original (タカダワタル的, Takada Wataru Teki) (2003)
- Moon and Cherry (2004)
- Akai bunka jūtaku no Hatsuko (赤い文化住宅の初子) (2007)
- One Million Yen Girl (2008)
- Ain't No Tomorrows (2008)
- The Cowards Who Looked to the Sky (2012)
- My Dad and Mr. Ito (2016)
- Romance Doll (ロマンスドール) (2019)
- The Cinematic Liars of Asahi-za (2021)
- My Broken Mariko (2022)

=== Video on demand ===
- Tokyo Women's Guidebook (東京女子図鑑, Tōkyō Joshi Zukan) (2016) [re-released as Tokyo Girl (2018)]
