= Akutagawa Prize =

Japanese literary award

- 芥川龍之介賞 (Akutagawa Ryūnosuke Shō)
- Awarded for: Best published literary story by a rising author
- Country: Japan
- Presented by: Society for the Promotion of Japanese Literature
- Reward: ¥1,000,000, pocket watch
- First award: 1935; 91 years ago
- Website: www.bunshun.co.jp/shinkoukai/award/akutagawa/

The Akutagawa Prize (芥川龍之介賞, Akutagawa Ryūnosuke Shō) is a Japanese literary award presented semi-annually. Because of its prestige and the considerable attention the winner receives from the media, it is, along with the Naoki Prize, one of Japan's most sought after literary prizes.

== History ==
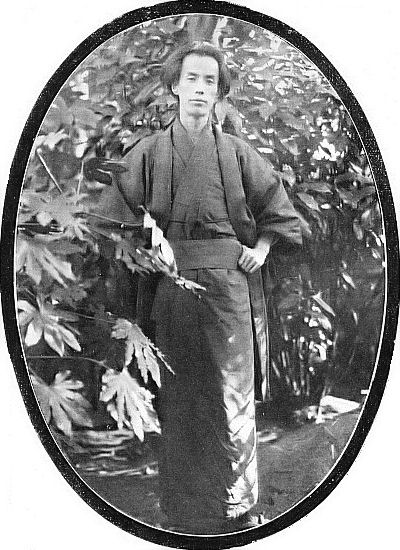
Ryūnosuke Akutagawa, author, after whom the prize is named

The Akutagawa Prize was established in 1935 by Kan Kikuchi, then-editor of Bungeishunjū magazine, in memory of author Ryūnosuke Akutagawa. It is sponsored by the Society for the Promotion of Japanese Literature, and is awarded in January and July to the best serious literary story published in a newspaper or magazine by a new or rising author. The winner receives a pocket watch and a cash award of 1 million yen. The judges usually include contemporary writers, literary critics, and former winners of the prize. Occasionally, when consensus cannot be reached between judges over disputes about the winning story or the quality of work for that half year, no prize is awarded. From 1945 through 1948 no prizes were awarded due to postwar instability. The prize has frequently been split between two authors.

On January 15, 2004, the awarding of the 130th Akutagawa Prize made significant news when two women became the award's youngest winners. The prize went to both Risa Wataya, 19, for her novel I Want to Kick You in the Back (蹴りたい背中, Keritai Senaka) and to Hitomi Kanehara, 20, for her debut novel Snakes and Earrings (蛇にピアス, Hebi ni Piasu). In 2013 Natsuko Kuroda won the 148th Akutagawa Prize at age 75, making her the oldest recipient in the history of the prize.

=== Controversies ===
In 1972, Akutagawa winner Akio Miyahara was found to have committed plagiarism. In 2018, a similar controversy occurred when the candidate novel Utsukushii Kao by Yuko Hojo was found to have reused text from its nonfiction source material without attribution, but the Society for the Promotion of Japanese Literature did not remove the book from the candidate list.

=== Records ===
- The youngest recipient of the prize to date is Risa Wataya who was 19 when she received the award for I Want to Kick You in the Back (Keritai Senaka (蹴りたい背中)).
- The best-seller title (in Japan only) is Spark (Hibana (火花)), by Naoki Matayoshi which sold 2,29 millions of copies.

== Winners ==
Bungeishunjū maintains an official archive of current and past winners on behalf of the Society for the Promotion of Japanese Literature.

Key
上	Indicates the first half of the given year.
下	Indicates the second half of the given year.

#	Year	Author	Work	Published in
1	1935上	Tatsuzō Ishikawa	Sōbō (蒼氓)	Seiza (星座)
2	1935下	No prize awarded.		
3	1936上	Takeo Oda	Jōgai (城外)	Bungaku Seikatsu (文學生活)
3	1936上	Tomoya Tsuruta	Koshamain-Ki (コシャマイン記)	Shōsetsu (小説)
4	1936下	Jun Ishikawa	The Bodhisattva (普賢, Fugen)	Sakuhin (作品)
4	1936下	Uio Tomisawa	Chichūkai (地中海)	Tōyō (東陽)
5	1937上	Kazuo Ozaki	Rosy Glasses (暢氣眼鏡 他, Nonki Megane)	Jinbutsu Hyōron (人物評論)
6	1937下	Ashihei Hino	Fun'nyōtan (糞尿譚)	Bungaku Kaigi (文學会議)
7	1938上	Gishū Nakayama	Atsumonozaki (厚物咲)	Bungakukai
8	1938下	Tsuneko Nakazato	Noriaibasha (乗合馬車 他)	Bungakukai
9	1939上	Yoshiyuki Handa	Niwatori Sōdō (鶏騒動)	Bungei Shuto (文藝首都)
9	1939上	Ken Hase	Asakusa no Kodomo (あさくさの子供)	(虚實)
10	1939下	Kōtarō Samukawa	Mitsuryōsha (密獵者)	Sōsaku (創作)
11	1940上	Takagi Taku refused by the author	Uta to mon no tate (歌と門の盾)	
12	1940下	Tsunehisa Sakurada	Hiraga Gen'nai (平賀源内)	Sakka Seishin (作家精神)
13	1941上	Yūkei Tada	Chōkō Deruta (長江デルタ)	Tairiku Ōrai (大陸往来)
14	1941下	Yoshiko Shibaki	Seika no Ichi (青果の市)	Bungei Shuto (文芸首都)
15	1942上	No prize awarded.		
16	1942下	Toshio Kuramitsu	Renrakuin (連絡員)	Seitō (正統)
17	1943上	Kikuzō Ishizuka	Tensoku no Koro (纏足の頃)	Mōkyō Bungaku (蒙疆文學)
18	1943下	Kaoru Tōnobe	Washi (和紙)	Tōhoku Bungaku (東北文學)
19	1944上	Yoshinori Yagi	Ryū Kanfū (劉廣福)	Nihon Bungakusha (日本文學者)
19	1944上	Jūzō Obi	Tōhan (登攀)	Kokumin Bungaku (國民文學)
20	1944下	Motoyoshi Shimizu	Karitachi (雁立)	Nihon Bungakusha (日本文學者)
21	1949上	Tsuyoshi Kotani	Kakushō (確証)	Sakka (作家)
21	1949上	Shigeko Yuki	Hon no Hanashi (本の話)	Sakuhin (作品)
22	1949下	Yasushi Inoue	The Bullfight (闘牛, Tōgyū)	Bungakukai
23	1950上	Ryōichi Tsuji	Ihōjin (異邦人)	Shin Shōsetsu (新小説)
24	1950下	No prize awarded.		
25	1951上	Kōbō Abe	Kabe—S. Karuma shi no Hanzai (壁—S・カルマ氏の犯罪)	Kindai Bungaku
25	1951上	Toshimitsu Ishikawa	Haru no Kusa (春の草 他)	Bungakukai
26	1951下	Yoshie Hotta	Hiroba no Kodoku (広場の孤独 他)	Chūōkōron
27	1952上	No prize awarded.		
28	1952下	Kōsuke Gomi	Sōshin (喪神)	Shinchō
28	1952下	Seichō Matsumoto	Aru "Kokura Nikki" Den (或る「小倉日記」伝)	Mita Bungaku
29	1953上	Shōtarō Yasuoka	Bad Company (悪い仲間, Warui Nakama)	Gunzō
29	1953上	Shōtarō Yasuoka	Inki na Tanoshimi (陰気な愉しみ)	Shinchō
30	1953下	No prize awarded.		
31	1954上	Junnosuke Yoshiyuki	Sudden Shower (驟雨・その他, Shūu, sono ta)	Bungakukai
32	1954下	Nobuo Kojima	The American School (アメリカン・スクール, Amerikan Sukūru)	Bungakukai
32	1954下	Junzō Shōno	Evenings at the Pool (プールサイド小景, Pūrusaido Shōkei)	Gunzō
33	1955上	Shūsaku Endō	White Man (白い人, Shiroi Hito)	Kindai Bungaku
34	1955下	Shintarō Ishihara	Season of Violence (太陽の季節, Taiyō no Kisetsu)	Bungakukai
35	1956上	Keitarō Kondō	Amabune (海人舟)	Bungakukai
36	1956下	No prize awarded.		
37	1957上	Itaru Kikumura	Iōjima (硫黄島)	Bungakukai
38	1957下	Takeshi Kaikō	The Naked King (裸の王様, Hadaka no Ōsama)	Bungakukai
39	1958上	Kenzaburō Ōe	Prize Stock (飼育, Shiiku)	Bungakukai
40	1958下	No prize awarded.		
41	1959上	Shirō Shiba	Santō (山塔)	Waseda Bungaku
42	1959下	No prize awarded.		
43	1960上	Morio Kita	Yoru to Kiri no Sumi de (夜と霧の隅で)	Shinchō
44	1960下	Tetsuo Miura	A Portrait of Shino (忍ぶ川, Shinobukawa)	Shinchō
45	1961上	No prize awarded.		
46	1961下	Kōichirō Uno	Kujiragami (鯨神)	Bungakukai
47	1962上	Akira Kawamura	Bidan no Shuppatsu (美談の出発)	Bungakugai (文学街)
48	1962下	No prize awarded.		
49	1963上	Kiichi Gotō	Shōnen no Hashi (少年の橋)	Yamagata Bungaku (山形文学)
49	1963上	Kōno Taeko	Crabs (蟹, Kani)	Bungakukai
50	1963下	Seiko Tanabe	Kanshō Ryokō (Senchimentaru Jāni) (感傷旅行 センチメンタル・ジャーニィ)	Kōro (航路)
51	1964上	Shō Shibata	Saredo Wareraga Hibi (されどわれらが日々──)	Zō (象)
52	1964下	No prize awarded.		
53	1965上	Setsuko Tsumura	Playthings (玩具, Gangu)	Bungakukai
54	1965下	Yūichi Takai	Kita no Kawa (北の河)	Sai (犀)
55	1966上	No prize awarded.		
56	1966下	Kenji Maruyama	Natsu no Nagare (夏の流れ)	Bungakukai
57	1967上	Tatsuhiro Ōshiro	The Cocktail Party (カクテル・パーティー, Kakuteru Pātī)	Shin Okinawa Bungaku (新沖縄文学)
58	1967下	Hyōzō Kashiwabara	Tokuyama Dōsuke no Kikyō (徳山道助の帰郷)	Shinchō
59	1968上	Saiichi Maruya	Toshi no Nokori (年の残り)	Bungakukai
59	1968上	Minako Ōba	The Three Crabs (三匹の蟹, Sanbiki no Kani)	Gunzō
60	1968下	No prize awarded.		
61	1969上	Kaoru Shōji	Akazukin-chan Ki o Tsukete (赤頭巾ちゃん気をつけて)	Chūōkōron
61	1969上	Hideo Takubo	Fukai Kawa (深い河)	Shinchō
62	1969下	Takayuki Kiyooka	Akashiya no Dairen (アカシヤの大連)	Gunzō
63	1970上	Tomoko Yoshida	Mumyōjōya (無明長夜)	Shinchō
63	1970上	Komao Furuyama	Pureō 8 no Yoake (プレオー8の夜明け)	Bungei
64	1970下	Yoshikichi Furui	Yoko (杳子, Yōko)	Bungei
65	1971上	No prize awarded.		
66	1971下	Kaisei Ri	The Woman who Fulled Clothes (砧をうつ女, Kinuta o Utsu Onna)	Kikan Geijutsu (季刊芸術)
66	1971下	Mineo Higashi	Child of Okinawa (オキナワの少年, Okinawa no Shōnen)	Bungakukai
67	1972上	Hiroshi Hatayama	Itsuka Kiteki o Narashite (いつか汽笛を鳴らして)	Bungakukai
67	1972上	Akio Miyahara	Dareka ga Sawatta (誰かが触った)	Bungei
68	1972下	Michiko Yamamoto	Betty-san (ベティさんの庭, Betei-san no Niwa)	Shinchō
68	1972下	Shizuko Gō	Requiem (れくいえむ, Rekuiemu)	Bungakukai
69	1973上	Taku Miki	Hiwa (鶸)	Subaru
70	1973下	Kuninobu Noro	Kusa no Tsurugi (草のつるぎ)	Bungakukai
70	1973下	Atsushi Mori	Gassan (月山)	Kikan Geijutsu (季刊芸術)
71	1974上	No prize awarded.		
72	1974下	Keizō Hino	Ano Yūhi (あの夕陽)	Shinchō
72	1974下	Hiro Sakata	Tsuchi no Utsuwa (土の器)	Bungakukai
73	1975上	Kyōko Hayashi	Ritual of Death (祭りの場, Matsuri no Ba)	Gunzō
74	1975下	Kenji Nakagami	The Cape (岬, Misaki)	Bungakukai
74	1975下	Kazuo Okamatsu	Shikanoshima (志賀島)	Bungakukai
75	1976上	Ryū Murakami	Almost Transparent Blue (限りなく透明に近いブルー, Kagirinaku Tōmei ni Chikai Burū)	Gunzō
76	1976下	No prize awarded.		
77	1977上	Masahiro Mita	Bokutte Nani (僕って何)	Bungei
77	1977上	Masuo Ikeda	Ēgekai ni Sasagu (エーゲ海に捧ぐ)	Shōsetsu Yasei Jidai
78	1977下	Teru Miyamoto	River of Fireflies (螢川, Hotarugawa)	Bungei Tenbō (文芸展望)
78	1977下	Shūzō Taki	Kaya no Ki Matsuri (榧の木祭り)	Shinchō
79	1978上	Kiichirō Takahashi	Nobuyo (伸予)	Bungei
79	1978上	Michitsuna Takahashi	Kugatsu no Sora (九月の空)	Bungei
80	1978下	No prize awarded.		
81	1979上	Yoshiko Shigekane	The Smoke in the Mountain Valley (やまあいの煙, Yamaai no Kemuri)	Bungakukai
81	1979上	Sō Aono	Gusha no Yoru (愚者の夜)	Bungakukai
82	1979下	Reiko Mori	Mokkingubādo no Iru Machi (モッキングバードのいる町)	Shinchō
83	1980上	No prize awarded.		
84	1980下	Katsuhiko Otsuji	Chichi ga Kieta (父が消えた)	Bungakukai
85	1981上	Rie Yoshiyuki	The Little Lady (小さな貴婦人, Chisana Kifujin)	Shinchō
86	1981下	No prize awarded.		
87	1982上	No prize awarded.		
88	1982下	Yukiko Katō	Yume no Kabe (夢の壁)	Shinchō
88	1982下	Jūrō Kara	Sagawa-kun Kara no Tegami (佐川君からの手紙)	Bungei
89	1983上	No prize awarded.		
90	1983下	Jun Kasahara	Mokuji no Sekai (杢二の世界)	Kaien
90	1983下	Nobuko Takagi	Hikari Idaku Tomo yo (光抱く友よ)	Shinchō
91	1984上	No prize awarded.		
92	1984下	Satoko Kizaki	The Phoenix Tree (青桐, Aogiri)	Bungakukai
93	1985上	No prize awarded.		
94	1985下	Fumiko Kometani	Passover (過越しの祭, Sugikoshi no matsuri)	Shinchō
95	1986上	No prize awarded.		
96	1986下	No prize awarded.		
97	1987上	Kiyoko Murata	In the Pot (鍋の中, Nabe no Naka)	Bungakukai
98	1987下	Natsuki Ikezawa	Still Life (スティル・ライフ, Sutiru Raifu)	Chūōkōron
98	1987下	Kiyohiro Miura	He's Leaving Home: My Young Son Becomes a Zen Monk (長男の出家, Chōnan no Shukke)	Kaien
99	1988上	Man Arai	Tazunebito no Jikan (尋ね人の時間)	Bungakukai
100	1988下	Keishi Nagi	Daiyamondo Dasuto (ダイヤモンドダスト)	Bungakukai
100	1988下	Lee Yangji	Yuhi (由煕)	Gunzō
101	1989上	No prize awarded.		
102	1989下	Akira Ōoka	Hyōsō Seikatsu (表層生活)	Bungakukai
102	1989下	Mieko Takizawa	Nekobaba no Iru Machi de (ネコババのいる町で)	Bungakukai
103	1990上	Noboru Tsujihara	Mura no Namae (村の名前)	Bungakukai
104	1990下	Yōko Ogawa	Pregnancy Diary (妊娠カレンダー, Ninshin Karendā)	Bungakukai
105	1991上	Yō Henmi	Jidō Kishō Sōchi (自動起床装置)	Bungakukai
105	1991上	Anna Ogino	Seoimizu (背負い水)	Bungakukai
106	1991下	Eiko Matsumura	Shikō Seisho Apatōn (至高聖所 アバトーン)	Kaien
107	1992上	Tomomi Fujiwara	Untenshi (運転士)	Gunzō
108	1992下	Yōko Tawada	The Bridegroom was a Dog (犬婿入り, Inu mukoiri)	Gunzō
109	1993上	Haruhiko Yoshimeki	Sekiryō Kōya (寂寥郊野)	Gunzō
110	1993下	Hikaru Okuizumi	The Stones Cry Out (石の来歴, Ishi no Raireki)	Bungakukai
111	1994上	Mitsuhiro Muroi	Odorudeku (おどるでく)	Gunzō
111	1994上	Yoriko Shōno	Taimu Surippu Konbināto (タイムスリップ・コンビナート)	Bungakukai
112	1994下	No prize awarded.		
113	1995上	Kazushi Hosaka	Kono Hito no Iki (この人の閾)	Shinchō
114	1995下	Eiki Matayoshi	Buta no Mukui (豚の報い)	Bungakukai
115	1996上	Hiromi Kawakami	Record of a Night Too Brief (蛇を踏む, Hebi o Fumu)	Bungakukai
116	1996下	Hitonari Tsuji	Kaikyō no Hikari (海峡の光)	Shinchō
116	1996下	Yū Miri	Kazoku Shinema (家族シネマ)	Gunzō
117	1997上	Shun Medoruma	Droplets (水滴, Suiteki)	Bungakukai
118	1997下	No prize awarded.		
119	1998上	Mangetsu Hanamura	Gerumaniamu no Yoru (ゲルマニウムの夜)	Bungakukai
119	1998上	Shū Fujisawa	Buenosu Airesu Gozen Reiji (ブエノスアイレス午前零時)	Bungei
120	1998下	Keiichirō Hirano	Eclipse (日蝕, Nisshoku)	Shinchō
121	1999上	No prize awarded.		
122	1999下	Gen Getsu	Kage no Sumika (蔭の棲みか)	Bungakukai
122	1999下	Chiya Fujino	Natsu no Yakusoku (夏の約束)	Gunzō
123	2000上	Kō Machida	Rip It Up (きれぎれ, Kiregire)	Bungakukai
123	2000上	Hisaki Matsuura	Hana Kutashi (花腐し)	Gunzō
124	2000下	Yūichi Seirai	Seisui (聖水)	Bungakukai
124	2000下	Toshiyuki Horie	The Bear and the Paving Stone (熊の敷石, Kuma no Shikiishi)	Gunzō
125	2001上	Sōkyū Gen'yū	Chūin no Hana (中陰の花)	Bungakukai
126	2001下	Yū Nagashima	Mō-Supīdo de Haha wa (猛スピードで母は)	Bungakukai
127	2002上	Shūichi Yoshida	Pāku Raifu (パーク・ライフ)	Bungakukai
128	2002下	Tamaki Daidō	Shoppai Doraibu (しょっぱいドライブ)	Bungakukai
129	2003上	Man'ichi Yoshimura	Hariganemushi (ハリガネムシ)	Bungakukai
130	2003下	Hitomi Kanehara	Snakes and Earrings (蛇にピアス, Hebi ni Piasu)	Subaru
130	2003下	Risa Wataya	I Want to Kick You in the Back (蹴りたい背中, Keritai Senaka)	Bungei
131	2004上	Norio Mobu	Kaigo Nyūmon (介護入門)	Bungakukai
132	2004下	Kazushige Abe	Gurando Fināre (グランド･フィナーレ)	Gunzō
133	2005上	Fuminori Nakamura	The Boy in the Earth (土の中の子供, Tsuchi no Naka no Kodomo)	Shinchō
134	2005下	Akiko Itoyama	Waiting in the Offing (沖で待つ, Oki de Matsu)	Bungakukai
135	2006上	Takami Itō	Hachigatsu no Rojō ni Suteru (八月の路上に捨てる)	Bungakukai
136	2006下	Nanae Aoyama	A Perfect Day to Be Alone (ひとり日和, Hitori Biyori)	Bungei
137	2007上	Tetsushi Suwa	Asatte no Hito (アサッテの人)	Gunzō
138	2007下	Mieko Kawakami	Chichi to Ran (乳と卵)	Bungakukai
139	2008上	Yang Yi	Toki ga Nijimu Asa (時が滲む朝)	Bungakukai
140	2008下	Kikuko Tsumura	Potosu Raimu no Fune (ポトスライムの舟)	Gunzō
141	2009上	Ken'ichirō Isozaki	Tsui no Sumika (終の住処)	Shinchō
142	2009下	No prize awarded.		
143	2010上	Akiko Akazome	Otome no Mikkoku (乙女の密告)	Shinchō
144	2010下	Mariko Asabuki	Kikotowa (きことわ)	Shinchō
144	2010下	Kenta Nishimura	Kueki Ressha (苦役列車)	Shinchō
145	2011上	No prize awarded.		
146	2011下	Toh EnJoe	Harlequin's Butterfly (道化師の蝶, Dōkeshi no Chō)	Gunzō
146	2011下	Shinya Tanaka	Cannibals (共喰い, Tomogui)	Subaru
147	2012上	Maki Kashimada	Touring the Land of the Dead (冥土めぐり, Meido Meguri)	Bungei
148	2012下	Natsuko Kuroda	ab Sango (abさんご)	Waseda Bungaku
149	2013上	Kaori Fujino	Nails and Eyes (爪と目, Tsume to Me)	Shinchō
150	2013下	Hiroko Oyamada	The Hole (穴, Ana)	Shinchō
151	2014上	Tomoka Shibasaki	Spring Garden (春の庭, Haru no Niwa)	Bungakukai
152	2014下	Masatsugu Ono	Kyūnenmae no Inori (九年前の祈り)	Gunzō
153	2015上	Keisuke Hada	Sukurappu Ando Birudo (スクラップ・アンド・ビルド)	Bungakukai
153	2015上	Naoki Matayoshi	Spark (火花, Hibana)	Bungakukai
154	2015下	Yūshō Takiguchi	Shinde Inai Mono (死んでいない者)	Bungakukai
154	2015下	Yukiko Motoya	An Exotic Marriage (異類婚姻譚, Irui Konin Tan)	Gunzō
155	2016上	Sayaka Murata	Convenience Store Woman (コンビニ人間, Konbini Ningen)	Bungakukai
156	2016下	Sumito Yamashita	Shinsekai (しんせかい)	Shinchō
157	2017上	Shinsuke Numata	Eiri (影裏)	Bungakukai
158	2017下	Chisako Wakatake	Ora Ora de Hitori Igumo (おらおらでひとりいぐも)	Bungei
158	2017下	Yūka Ishii	The Mud of a Century (百年泥, Hyakunen Doro)	Shinchō
159	2018上	Hiroki Takahashi	Okuribi (送り火)	Bungakukai
160	2018下	Ryōhei Machiya	1R 1-Pun 34-Byō (1R1分34秒)	Shinchō
160	2018下	Takahiro Ueda	Nimuroddo (ニムロッド)	Gunzō
161	2019上	Natsuko Imamura	The Woman in the Purple Skirt (むらさきのスカートの女, Murasaki no Sukāto no Onna)	Shōsetsu Tripper
162	2019下	Makoto Furukawa	Seitaka Awadachisō (背高泡立草)	Subaru
163	2020上	Haruka Tono	Hakyoku (破局)	Bungei
163	2020上	Haneko Takayama	Shuri no Uma (首里の馬)	Shinchō
164	2020下	Rin Usami	Idol, Burning (推し、燃ゆ, Oshi, Moyu)	Bungei
165	2021上	Li Kotomi	Higanbana ga saku shima (彼岸花が咲く島)	Bungakukai
165	2021上	Mai Ishizawa	The Place of Shells (貝に続く場所にて, Kai ni tsudzuku basho nite)	Gunzō
166	2021下	Bunji Sunakawa	Black Box (ブラックボックス)	Gunzō
167	2022上	Junko Takase	May You Have Delicious Meals (おいしいごはんが食べられますように, Oishii Gohan ga Taberaremasuyōni)	Gunzō
168	2022下	Iko Idogawa	Kono Yo no Yorokobi yo (この世の喜びよ)	Gunzō
168	2022下	Atsushi Satō (author)	Arechi no Kazoku (荒地の家族)	Shinchō
169	2023上	Saou Ichikawa	Hunchback (ハンチバック, Hunchback)	Bungei
170	2023下	Rie Kudan	Sympathy Tokyo Tower (東京都同情塔, Tokyō-to Dōjō-tō)	Shinchō
171	2024上	Aki Asahina	Sanshōuo no Shijūkunichi (サンショウウオの四十九日)	Shinchō
171	2024上	Sanzō K. Matsunaga	Bari Sankō (バリ山行)	Gunzō
172	2024下	Jose Ando	Dtopia	Bungei
172	2024下	Yuui Suzuki	Goethe wa Subete o Itta (ゲーテはすべてを言った)	Shōsetsu Tripper
173	2025上	No prize awarded.		
174	2025下	Makoto Toriyama	Toki no Ie (時の家)	Kodansha
174	2025下	Ushio Hatakeyama	Sakebi (叫び)	Shinchō
175	2026上	Chito Kosagawa	Zombie Kaishufu (ゾンビ回収婦)	Gunzō

== Winners and nominees available in English translation ==
=== Winners ===
- 1936 (4th) - Jun Ishikawa, The Bodhisattva (trans. William J. Tyler, Columbia University Press, 1990)
- 1937 (5th) - Kazuo Ozaki, Rosy Glasses (in Rosy Glasses and Other Stories, trans. Robert Epp, Paul Norbury Publications, 1988)
- 1949 (22nd) - Yasushi Inoue, The Bullfight (trans. Michael Emmerich, Pushkin Press, 2013)
- 1953 (29th) - Shōtarō Yasuoka, Bad Company (in A View by the Sea, trans. Karen Wigen Lewis, Columbia University Press, 1984)
- 1954 (31st) - Junnosuke Yoshiyuki, Sudden Shower (In New Writing in Japan, trans. Geoffrey Bownas, Penguin, 1972)
- 1954 (32nd)
  - Nobuo Kojima, The American School (In Contemporary Japanese Literature, trans. William F. Sibley, Alfred A. Knopf, 1977)
  - Junzo Shono, Evenings at the Pool (In Still Life and Other Stories, trans. Wayne P. Lammers, Stone Bridge Press, 1992)
- 1955 (33rd) - Shūsaku Endō, White Man (In White Man, Yellow Man, trans. Teruyo Shimizu, Paulist Press, 2014)
- 1955 (34th) - Shintaro Ishikawa, Season of Violence (In Season of Violence, trans. John G. Mills, Toshie Takahama, and Ken Tremayne, Tuttle, 1966)
- 1957 (38th) - Takeshi Kaiko, The Naked King (In Japan Quarterly, vol. 24, no. 2, trans. Howard Curtis, 1977)
- 1958 (39th) - Kenzaburō Ōe, Prize Stock (In Teach Us to Outgrow Our Madness, trans. John Nathan, Grove Press, 1977)
- 1960 (44th) - Tetsuo Miura, A Portrait of Shino (In Shame in the Blood, trans. Andrew Driver, Catapult, 2007)
- 1963 (49th) - Taeko Kono, Crabs (In Toddler-Hunting and Other Stories, trans. Lucy North, New Directions Publishing, 1996)
- 1965 (53rd) - Setsuko Tsumura, Playthings (In Japan Quarterly, vol. 27, no. 1, trans. Kyoko Evanhoe and Robert N. Lawson, 1980)
- 1967 (57th) - Tatsuhiro Ōshiro, The Cocktail Party (In Okinawa: Two Postwar Novellas, trans. Steve Rabson, Institute of East Asian Studies, 1989)
- 1968 (59th) - Minako Oba, The Three Crabs (in This Kind of Woman: Ten Stories by Japanese Women Writers, 1960-1976, trans. Yukiko Tanaka and Elizabeth Hanson, Stanford University Press, 1982)
- 1970 (64th) - Yoshikichi Furui, Yoko (In Child of Darkness: Yoko and Other Stories, trans. Donna George Storey, University of Michigan Center for Japanese Studies, 1997)
- 1971 (66th)
  - Kaisei Ri, The Woman Who Fulled Clothes (In Flowers of Fire: Twentieth-Century Korean Stories, trans. Beverly Nelson, University of Hawaii Press, 1986)
  - Mineo Higashi, Child of Okinawa (In Okinawa: Two Postwar Novellas, trans. Steve Rabson, Institute of East Asian Studies, 1989)
- 1972 (68th)
  - Michiko Yamamoto, Betty-san (In Betty-san, trans. Geraldine Harcourt, Kodansha International, 1985)
  - Shizuko Gō, Requiem (trans. Geraldine Harcourt, Kodansha International, 1983)
- 1975 (73rd) - Kyoko Hayashi, Ritual of Death (In Nuke Rebuke: Writers and Artists against Nuclear Energy and Weapons, trans. Kyoko Selden, The Spirit That Moves Us Press, 1984)
- 1975 (74th) - Kenji Nakagami, The Cape (In The Cape and Other Stories from the Japanese Ghetto, trans. Eve Zimmerman, Stone Bridge Press, 1999)
- 1976 (75th) - Ryū Murakami, Almost Transparent Blue (trans. Nancy Andrew, Kodansha International, 1977)
- 1977 (78th) - Teru Miyamoto, River of Fireflies (in Rivers, trans. Roger K. Thomas and Ralph McCarthy, Kurodahan Press, 2014)
- 1979 (81st) - Yoshiko Shigekane, The Smoke in the Mountain Valley (In Mississippi Review, vol. 39, no. 1/3, trans. John Wilson and Motoko Naruse, 2012)
- 1981 (85th) - Rie Yoshiyuki, The Little Lady (In Japanese Literature Today, no. 7, trans. Geraldine Harcourt, 1982)
- 1984 (92nd) - Satoko Kizaki, The Phoenix Tree (In The Phoenix Tree and Other Stories, trans. Carol A. Flath, Kodansha International, 1990)
- 1985 (94th) - Fumiko Kometani, Passover (In Passover, trans. by the author, Carroll and Graf, 1989)
- 1987 (97th) - Kiyoko Murata, In the Pot (In Japanese Women Writers: Twentieth Century Short Fiction, trans. Kyoko Iriye Seldon, Routledge, 2015)
- 1987 (98th)
  - Natsuki Ikezawa, Still Life (In Still Lives, trans. Dennis Keene, Kodansha International, 1997)
  - Kiyohiro Miura, He's Leaving Home: My Young Son Becomes a Zen Monk (trans. Jeff Shore, Tuttle, 1996)
- 1990 (104th) - Yōko Ogawa, Pregnancy Diary (In The Diving Pool, trans. Stephen Snyder, Picador, 2008)
- 1992 (108th) - Yoko Tawada, The Bridegroom was a Dog (In The Bridegroom was a Dog, trans. Margaret Mitsutani, Kodansha International, 2003)
- 1993 (110th) - Hikaru Okuizumi, The Stones Cry Out (trans. James Westerhoven, Harcourt, 1999)
- 1996 (115th) - Hiromi Kawakami, Record of a Night Too Brief (trans. Lucy North, Pushkin Press, 2017)
- 1997 (117th) - Shun Medoruma, Droplets (In Southern Exposure: Modern Japanese Literature from Okinawa, trans. Michael Molasky, University of Hawaii Press, 2000)
- 1998 (120th) - Keiichiro Hirano, Eclipse (trans. Brent de Chene and Charles De Wolf, Columbia University Press, 2024)
- 2000 (123rd) - Kō Machida, Rip It Up (trans. Daniel Joseph, Mercurial Editions, 2022)
- 2000 (124th) - Toshiyuki Horie, The Bear and the Paving Stone (In The Bear and the Paving Stone, trans. Geraint Howells, Pushkin Press, 2018)
- 2003 (130th)
  - Hitomi Kanehara, Snakes and Earrings (trans. David Karashima, Dutton, 2005)
  - Risa Wataya, I Want to Kick You in the Back (trans. Julianne Neville, One Peace Books, 2015)
- 2005 (133rd) - Fuminori Nakamura, The Boy in the Earth (trans. Allison Markin Powell, Soho Crime, 2017)
- 2005 (134th) - Akiko Itoyama, Waiting in the Offing (In Words Without Borders, April 2007, trans. Charles De Wolf)
- 2006 (136th) - Nanae Aoyama, A Perfect Day to Be Alone (trans. Jesse Kirkwood, MacLehose Press, 2024)
- 2011 (146th)
  - Toh EnJoe, Harlequin Butterfly (trans. David Boyd, Pushkin Press, 2024)
  - Shinya Tanaka, Cannibals (trans. Kalau Almony, Honford Star, 2024)
- 2012 (147th) - Maki Kashimada, Touring the Land of the Dead (trans. Haydn Trowell, Europa Editions, 2021)
- 2013 (149th) - Kaori Fujino, Nails and Eyes (trans. Kendall Heitzman, Pushkin Press, 2023)
- 2013 (150th) - Hiroko Oyamada, The Hole (trans. David Boyd, New Directions Publishing, 2020)
- 2014 (151st) - Tomoka Shibasaki, Spring Garden (trans. Polly Barton, Pushkin Press, 2017)
- 2015 (153rd) - Naoki Matayoshi, Spark (trans. Allison Watts, Pushkin Press, 2020)
- 2015 (154th) - Yukiko Motoya, An Exotic Marriage (In The Lonesome Bodybuilder, trans. Asa Yoneda, Soft Skull, 2018)
- 2016 (155th) - Sayaka Murata, Convenience Store Woman (trans. Ginny Tapley Takemori, Grove Press, 2018)
- 2017 (158th) - Yuka Ishii, The Mud of a Century (trans. Haydn Trowell, Gazebo Books, 2023)
- 2019 (161st) - Natsuko Imamura, The Woman in the Purple Skirt (trans. Lucy North, Faber and Faber, 2021)
- 2020 (164th) - Rin Usami, Idol, Burning (trans. Asa Yoneda, HarperVia, 2022)
- 2021 (165th) - Mai Ishizawa, The Place of Shells (trans. Polly Barton, New Directions Publishing, 2025)
- 2022 (167th) - Junko Takase, May You Have Delicious Meals (trans. Morgan Giles, Penguin, 2025)
- 2023 (169th) - Saou Ichikawa, Hunchback (trans. Polly Barton, Penguin, 2025)
- 2023 (170th) - Rie Kudan, Sympathy Tower Tokyo (trans. Jesse Kirkwood, Penguin, 2025)

=== Nominees ===
- 1949 (22nd) - Yasushi Inoue, The Hunting Gun (trans. Michael Emmerich, Pushkin Press, 2014)
- 1951 (25th) - Shōtarō Yasuoka, The Glass Slipper (In The Glass Slipper and Other Stories, trans. Royall Tyler, Dalkey Archive Press, 2008)
- 1952 (27th) - Shōtarō Yasuoka, Homework (In The Glass Slipper and Other Stories, trans. Royall Tyler, Dalkey Archive Press, 2008)
- 1952 (28th)
  - Shōtarō Yasuoka, Prized Possessions (In Contemporary Japanese Literature, trans. Edwin McClellan, Alfred A. Knopf, 1977)
  - Nobuo Kojima, The Rifle (In The Oxford Book of Japanese Short Stories, trans. Lawrence Rogers, Oxford University Press, 1997)
- 1960 (43rd) - Yumiko Kurahashi, Partei (In This Kind of Woman: Ten Stories by Japanese Women Writers, 1960-1976, trans. Yukiko Tanaka and Elizabeth Hanson, Stanford University Press, 1982)
- 1962 (46th) - Kōno Taeko, Snow (In Toddler-Hunting and Other Stories, trans. Lucy North. New Directions Publishing, 1996)
- 1964 (51st) - Masaaki Tachihara, Torchlight Nō (In Cliff's Edge and Other Stories, trans. Stephen W. Kohl, Midwest Publishers, 1980)
- 1965 (53rd) - Masaaki Tachihara, Cliff's Edge (In Cliff's Edge and Other Stories, trans. Stephen W. Kohl, Midwest Publishers, 1980)
- 1971 (65th) - Kin Sekihan, The Curious Tale of Mandogi's Ghost (trans. Cindi L. Textor, Columbia University Press, 2010)
- 1979 (81st) - Haruki Murakami, Hear the Wind Sing (in Wind/Pinball: Two Novels, trans. Ted Goossen, Alfred A. Knopf, 2015)
- 1980 (83rd) - Haruki Murakami, Pinball, 1973 (in Wind/Pinball: Two Novels, trans. Ted Goossen, Alfred A. Knopf, 2015)
- 1980 (84th) - Satoko Kizaki, Barefoot (In The Phoenix Tree and Other Stories, trans. Carol A. Flath, Kodansha International, 1990)
- 1981 (85th) - Satoko Kizaki, The Flame Trees (In The Phoenix Tree and Other Stories, trans. Carol A. Flath, Kodansha International, 1990)
- 1985 (94th) - Amy Yamada, Bedtime Eyes (In Bedtime Eyes, trans. Yumi Gunji and Marc Jardine, St. Martin's Press, 2006)
- 1986 (95th) - Amy Yamada, Jesse (In Bedtime Eyes, trans. Yumi Gunji and Marc Jardine, St. Martin's Press, 2006)
- 1989 (102nd) - Yōko Ogawa, The Diving Pool (In The Diving Pool, trans. Stephen Snyder, Picador, 2008)
- 1998 (120th) - Mari Akasaka, Vibrator (trans. Michael Emmerich, Faber & Faber, 2005)
- 2001 (125th) - Kazushige Abe, Nipponia Nippon (trans. Kerim Yasar, Pushkin Press, 2023)
- 2002 (128th) - Fuminori Nakamura, The Gun (trans. Allison Markin Powell, Soho Press, 2016)
- 2003 (129th) - Akiko Itoyama, It's Only Talk (trans. Raquel Hill, Japan Times Press, 2009)
- 2004 (132nd) - Nao-Cola Yamazaki, Don't Laugh at Other People's Sex Lives (trans. Polly Barton, Daunt Books, 2026)
- 2012 (148th) - Masatsugu Ono, Lion Cross Point (trans. Angus Turvill, Two Lines Press, 2018)
- 2016 (155th) - Nao-Cola Yamazaki, Beautiful Distance (trans. Charlotte Goff, Daunt Books, 2026)
- 2021 (166th) - Rie Kudan, Schoolgirl (In Schoolgirl, trans. Haydn Trowell, Gazebo Books, 2025)
- 2022 (167th) - Suzumi Suzuki, Gifted (trans. Allison Markin Powell, Transit Books, 2024)

== Current members of the selection committee and year appointed ==
- Amy Yamada, 2003
- Hiromi Kawakami, 2007
- Yōko Ogawa, 2007
- Masahiko Shimada, 2010
- Hikaru Okuizumi, 2012
- Shuichi Yoshida, 2016
- Hisaki Matsuura, 2019
- Keiichiro Hirano, 2020
- Mieko Kawakami, 2024

== See also ==
- List of Japanese literary awards
