= Fujino (surname) =

Fujino (written: 藤野 or 藤乃) is a Japanese surname. Notable people with the surname include:

- Chiya Fujino (藤野 千夜, born 1962), Japanese writer
- Emi Fujino (藤野 恵実, born 1980), Japanese mixed martial artist, kickboxer and professional wrestler
- Hideyuki Fujino (藤野 秀之, born 1974), Japanese drifting driver
- Kaori Fujino (藤野 可織, born 1980), Japanese writer
- Kaoru Fujino (藤野 かほる, born 1972), Japanese voice actress
- Maiko Fujino (藤野 舞子, born 1983), Japanese swimmer
- Makiko Fujino (藤野 真紀子, born 1949), Japanese politician
- Michimasa Fujino (藤野 道格), Japanese engineer and businessman
- Tomokazu Fujino (藤野 智一, born 1967), Japanese cyclist
- Tsuyoshi Fujino (藤野 強, born 1962), Japanese slalom canoeist
- Yasufumi Fujino (藤野 保史, born 1970), Japanese politician

== Fictional characters ==
- Shizuru Fujino (藤乃 静留), a character in the anime series My-HiME
- Shion Fujino (藤乃 紫音), a character in the hentai manga Hatsuinu

== See also ==
- Fujino (disambiguation)
