= Kazuo Okamatsu =

- Born: 23 June 1931; Fukuoka, Fukuoka, Japan
- Died: 21 January 2012 (aged 80); Kamakura, Kanagawa, Japan
- Occupations: Novelist, philologist
- Writing career
- Genre

Kazuo Okamatsu (岡松和夫, Okamatsu Kazuo; June 23, 1931 – January 21, 2012) was a Japanese philologist and novelist.

== Biography ==
Okamatsu was born in the city of Fukuoka in Kyushu, Japan. He graduated from the Department of French literature at the University of Tokyo, following which he decided to continue his studies in the field of philology and Japanese literature. His literary career began in 1955, with his participation in a national writing contest, which resulted in the publication of Yuri no kioku ( 百合の記憶 ) under the pen name of Kazuo Aoki in the literary magazine Bungei. In 1957, he married the niece of the noted translator Teiichi Hirai and began working as an instructor at a high school in Yokohama. In 1959, Okamatsu won the Bungakukai New Author's Award organized by the magazine Bungakukai. In 1964, he was invited by editor Tachihara Masaaki to join the literary cotiere Sai (犀), whose other members included Otohiko Kaga, Meisei Goto and Yuichi Takai. From 1966, he worked as a part-time professor of Japanese literature at Kanto Gakuin Women's Junior College in Yokohama. He was promoted to assistant professor in 1968 and full professor in 1973. During the 1970s, he was nominated for the prestigious Akutagawa Prize three times, before winning the award in 1975 for his work Shikanoshima (志賀島).

Okamatsu relocated to São Paulo in Brazil in 1980 for a number of years as a researcher. He was known in the 1980s for his works on the poet and Zen master Ikkyū. Okamatsu won the Kawabata Yasunari Prize in 1985, the Nitta Jiro Prize in 1986 and the Kiyama Shohei Prize in 1998. After his return to Japan, he was an active member of the Japanese branch of PEN International.

In January 2012, Okamatsu died of pneumonia at the age of 80 years.

== Noted works ==
- 1975 Kumano (熊野)
- 1975 Shikanoshima (志賀島)
- 1987 Kuchibeni (口紅)
- 1991 Ikkyū densetsu (一休伝説)
