= Yuka Ishii =

Japanese writer

- 石井 遊佳
- Born: 1963 (age 62–63); Hirakata, Osaka, Japan
- Education: Waseda University; University of Tokyo
- Occupation: Writer
- Writing career
- Language: Japanese
- Genre: Fiction
- Notable work: Hyakunen doro
- Notable awards: Akutagawa Prize; Shincho Prize for New Writers

Yuka Ishii (石井 遊佳, Ishii Yūka; born 1963) is a Japanese writer. Her book Hyakunen doro (100 Years Mud) won the 154th Akutagawa Prize and the 49th Shincho Prize for New Writers.

== Biography ==
Ishii was born in Hirakata, Osaka and lived there during her early school years. She later moved to Tokyo, where she graduated from Waseda University and worked at a variety of part-time jobs, including department store salesperson and snack hostess, while writing stories in her free time. After almost winning a literary prize at age 33 she moved back to her parents' home in Osaka to try writing full-time. In 2000 Ishii returned to Tokyo to pursue graduate study in Buddhism at the University of Tokyo.

In 2014 Ishii moved to Chennai, India, where her husband worked as a Sanskrit language researcher, and she started working as a Japanese language teacher. She made her literary debut at age 54 with her novel Hyakunen doro, about the aftermath of a once-in-a-century flood. The story was based on her experiences in Chennai during the 2015 South Indian floods. Hyakunen doro won the 49th Shincho Prize for New Writers. It also won the 158th Akutagawa Prize, which she shared with Chisako Wakatake.

Hyakunen doro was published in English by Sydney-based publisher Gazebo Books in a translation by Haydn Trowell as The Mud of a Century.

She has named Gabriel García Márquez and Yukio Mishima as two of her favorite authors.

== Recognition ==
- 2017: 49th Shincho Prize for New Writers
- 2018: 158th Akutagawa Prize (2017下)

== Works ==
- Hyakunen doro, Shinchosha, 2018, ISBN 9784103515319
