= Furui =

Furui (written: 古井) is a Japanese surname. Notable people with the surname include:

- Hirohito Furui (古井 弘人), Japanese music arranger and keyboardist
- Yoshikichi Furui (古井 由吉; 1937–2020), Japanese writer and translator
