= Kiyohiro =

- Gender: Male

Origin
- Origin: Japanese
- Meaning: Different meanings depending on the kanji used

Kiyohiro (written: 清寛, 清宏 or 輝良寛) is a masculine Japanese given name. Notable people with the name include:

- Kiyohiro Araki (荒木 清寛; born 1956), Japanese politician
- Kiyohiro Hirabayashi (平林 輝良寛; born 1984), Japanese footballer
- Kiyohiro Miura (三浦 清宏; born 1930), Japanese writer
- Torii Kiyohiro (鳥居 清広; died c. 1776), Japanese artist
