= Tetsushi =

- Gender: Male

Origin
- Origin: Japanese
- Meaning: Different meanings depending on the kanji used

Tetsushi (written: 哲司, 哲史, 哲志, 徹志 or 哲士) is a masculine Japanese given name. Notable people with the name include:

- Tetsushi Kondo (近藤 徹志; born 1986), Japanese footballer
- Miyabiyama Tetsushi (雅山 哲士; born 1977), Japanese sumo wrestler
- Tetsushi Sakamoto (坂本 哲志; born 1950), Japanese politician
- Tetsushi Suwa (諏訪 哲史; born 1969), Japanese writer
- Tetsushi Tanaka (田中 哲司; born 1966), Japanese actor
