= Mariko Asabuki =

Japanese writer

- 朝吹 真理子
- Born: 1984 (age 41–42); Tokyo, Japan
- Occupation: Writer
- Writing career
- Language: Japanese
- Genre: Fiction
- Notable works: きことわ (Kikotowa); 流跡 (Ryūseki)
- Notable awards: Akutagawa Prize; Bunkamura Deux Magots Prize

Mariko Asabuki (朝吹 真理子, Asabuki Mariko) is a Japanese writer. Her novels have won the Akutagawa Prize and the Bunkamura Deux Magots Prize, and she was named one of Vogue Japan's 2011 Women of the Year.

== Early life ==
Asabuki was born in 1984 in Tokyo, Japan, into a literary family that has lived in Tokyo since the Meiji period. Her father, Ryoji Asabuki, is a poet, and several other relatives are literary scholars and translators. Asabuki started writing stories at the age of 3. She attended an all-girls high school in Tokyo.

== Career ==
Asabuki entered graduate school at Keio University to study modern kabuki. In 2009 her first novel, Ryūseki (Ruins), was published in the literary magazine Shinchō. In the following year Ryūseki won the Bunkamura Deux Magots Prize and was published in book form by Shinchosha. In 2011, while Asabuki was still a Keio University graduate student, her second novel, titled Kikotowa, was published. Kikotowa won the 144th Akutagawa Prize, and Vogue Japan named Asabuki one of its 2011 Women of the Year. She later completed a master's degree. In 2016 she began serializing a new novel, titled TIMELESS, in Shinchō. From 2016 to 2017 Asabuki wrote the regular "#明日何着よう" ("What Should I Wear Tomorrow?) column for Asahi Shimbun. In 2018 Shinchosha published TIMELESS as a book.

Asabuki's first nonfiction book, a collection of essays written within the previous decade, was published under the title Hikidashi no naka no Umi (lit. The Sea in the Drawer, 抽斗のなかの海) by Chuokoron-Shinsha in 2019. According to Asabuki, the title comes from a fantasy that the back of her desk drawer is connected to the sea, which helps her imagine her work reaching other people even when she writes alone. Writing for the Yomiuri Shimbun, novelist Sayaka Murata described the book's essays as feeling almost like short stories, and the resulting work as a "treasure".

Asabuki regularly collaborates with other writers, artists, and musicians to create site-specific multimedia performances using readings from her work. She has cited Kenzaburo Oe, James Joyce, Mieko Kanai, and Roland Barthes as some of her favorite writers. Asabuki is a fan of shogi. She is married to designer Kōtarō Watanabe.

== Awards and honors ==
- 2010: Bunkamura Deux Magots Prize
- 2011: Vogue Japan Woman of the Year
- 2011: 144th Akutagawa Prize (2010下)

== Works ==
- 流跡 (Ryūseki), Shinchosha, 2010, ISBN 9784103284611
- きことわ (Kikotowa), Shinchosha, 2011, ISBN 9784103284628
- TIMELESS, Shinchosha, 2018, ISBN 9784103284635
- 抽斗のなかの海 (Hikidashi no naka no Umi), Chuokoron-Shinsha, 2019, ISBN 9784120052002
