= Michiko Yamamoto =

Japanese writer and poet

- 古屋道子
- Born: 4 December 1936; Tokyo, Japan
- Died: 29 January 2026 (aged 89); Chigasaki, Kanagawa, Japan
- Occupation: Writer
- Writing career
- Pen name: 山本道子
- Language: Japanese
- Genres: Fiction; Short story; Poetry
- Notable works: "Mahō"; "Betei-san no niwa"; Mofuku no ko
- Notable awards: Shincho Prize for New Writers; Akutagawa Prize; Izumi Kyoka Prize for Literature

Michiko Yamamoto (山本道子, Yamamoto Michiko; 4 December 1936 – 29 January 2026) is the professional name of Michiko Furuya (古屋道子, Furuya Michiko), a Japanese writer and poet. Yamamoto won the Shincho Prize for New Writers, the Akutagawa Prize, and the Izumi Kyoka Prize for Literature.

== Biography ==
Yamamoto was born in Nakano, Tokyo and graduated from Atomi University in 1957. Her first three short stories, "Mahō," "Ame no Isu," and "Betei-san no Niwa" appeared in Shinchō magazine in March, July and November 1972 editions, respectively. "Rōjin no Kamo" was published August 1972 in the magazine Fūkei. These four stories were based on her experience living in Darwin, Northern Territory, Australia, where she had accompanied her husband in 1967. They later appeared in a collective issue. “Betty-san” became the title story for the English version, which was translated by Geraldine Harcourt and published in 1984 by Kodansha.

She lived in Kamakura, Kanagawa with her husband. The couple had two grown daughters.

Yamamoto died on 29 January 2026 at a hospital in Chigasaki, at the age of 89.

== Literary awards ==
- 1972 4th Shinchō Prize for New Writers for Mahō (Powers)
- 1972 68th Akutagawa Prize for Betei-san no Niwa (Betty’s Garden)
- 1993 21st Izumi Kyōka Prize for Literature

== Bibliography ==
- Mahō (Powers)
- Ame no Isu (Chair in the Rain)
- Betei-san no Niwa (Betty-san)(1973), title story of four short stories
- Rōjin no Kamo (Father Gooze)
- Razō (1974), short stories
- Nichiyōbi no Kasa (1976), poetry
- Yamamoto Michiko Shishū (1976), poetry
- Tenshi yo Umi ni mae (1981), novel
- Umi no Satō-kibi (1982), short stories
- Birejji no Ame (1982), short stories
