= Tatsuhiro Ōshiro =

Japanese novelist and playwright (1925–2020)

- Born: September 19, 1925 Nakagusuku, Okinawa, Japan
- Died: October 27, 2020 (aged 95)
- Occupation: Novelist, playwright
- Language: Japanese, Okinawan
- Genre: Fiction, theatre

Tatsuhiro Ōshiro (大城 立裕, Ōshiro Tatsuhiro; 19 September 1925 – 27 October 2020) was an Okinawan novelist and playwright from Okinawa, Ryukyu Islands.

He was awarded the Akutagawa Prize in 1967 for his novella of the same year, The Cocktail Party, which has been adapted for the stage and made into a film.

Ōshiro has also been an innovator of the traditional Ryukyuan narrative dance form known as kumi odori. Having added twenty new pieces to the repertoire, Ōshiro is credited as having "single-handedly revived the genre that originated in the 18th century" by incorporating Okinawa shibai (dramas in the Okinawan language) and distinctive rhythms to construct a fluid, hybrid cultural identity.

His writings have been noted for making Okinawan culture and history accessible to Japanese readership, while his more popular works have been critically praised for "offering an acute perspective on the psychological and moral implications of war and military occupation."

== Education and background ==
In 1943, Ōshiro enrolled at Tōa Dobunshoin University (East Asian University of Literature), a Japanese institution of higher education established in Shanghai’s Hongqiao neighborhood. In 1946, he returned to Japan following the nation's defeat in World War II and worked as a high school teacher. He later worked in the governmental offices of Okinawa Prefecture, where he was in charge of editing materials in the fields of economics and history. From 1983 to 1986, he served as the director of the Okinawa Prefectural Museum & Art Museum.

== Works ==
Many of Oshiro's works depict the complex, controversial geopolitics of Okinawa. His stories show individuals caught in the turmoil of historical conditions such as the transformation of the premodern Ryukyu Kingdom into a prefecture of modern Japan, Okinawa's post-World War II military occupation by the United States, and the island's extensive hosting of U.S. military bases in the 21st century despite widespread local opposition and protests.

His book Noroeste Railway (1985) is considered one of the best works on the lives and minds of Japanese emigrants ('Nikkei'). It dwells on a Japanese couple who were amongst the first Japanese to emigrate to Brazil, in 1908, and their struggle to manage their dual national and cultural connections. (Prof. Nishi Masahiko)

=== The Cocktail Party ===
His first major success was The Cocktail Party (1967), for which he won an Akutagawa Prize in 1967, becoming the first Okinawan author to earn the distinction. The novella tells the story of an Okinawan man, the narrator, who is invited to a house party on a U.S. base also attended by American, Chinese, and Japanese guests. During the party, the narrator is forced to navigate a conversational minefield due to the cultural perceptions and divergent political views among the guests. When he returns home that evening, he learns that his daughter was raped by the U.S. serviceman renting a room from him. When he turns to friends and acquaintances, he discovers that unresolved historical issues will impede justice for his daughter.

The novella has been noted for addressing the epidemic of military rape, exemplified in such incidents as the Yumiko-chan incident, in which efforts to pursue criminal charges against a U.S. soldier over the rape and murder of a six-year-old girl were hampered by Okinawa's extraterritoriality.

In 2015, The Cocktail Party was made into an independent film directed by Regge Life. The novella has been adapted for the stage, with a premiere at the Hawaii Okinawa Center in 2011.

== Awards ==
- Akutagawa Prize for The Cocktail Party, 1967
- Medal of Honor, Purple Ribbon (Shiju Hōshō), 1990
- Okinawa Times Prize, 1991
- Taiko Hirabayashi Literary Prize, 1993
- Person of Cultural Merit, 1995
- Order of the Rising Sun, 1996
- Ryūkyū Shinpō Prize, 1998
- Okinawa Person of Merit, 2000
- Yasunari Kawabata Literary Prize, 2015

== Bibliography ==
- "Turtleback Tombs" (1966) - edited by Steve Rabson and Michael Molasky in Southern Exposure: Modern Japanese Literature From Okinawa (University of Hawaiʻi Press, 2000)
- The Cocktail Party (1967) - edited and translated by Steve Rabson in Okinawa: Two Postwar Novellas (Institute of East Asian Studies, 1989)
- The Ryūkyū Disposition: A Novel (1968)
- White Season (1968)
- Okinawa: An On-Location Report (1969)
- Hidden Okinawa: Its Heart and Culture (1972)
- Panari Island Fantasy (1972)
- On the Border of Assimilation and Dissimilation (1972)
- Japan: Torn Between Love and Hate (1972)
- Master of the Wind: The Life and Times of Takuji Iwasaki (1974)
- Island of the Gods (1974)
- Okinawa, Now Officially Japan: Reflections on the Transitional Era (1977)
- Visions of a Motherland (1978)
- After the Glorious Banquet (1979)
- Okinawan History Primer: An Alternative Japanese History of Life on the South Seas (1980)
- Views on Teaching About Okinawa (1980)
- The Heart Sutra: An Introduction (1981)
- Mornings in Shanghai: Works From Tōa Dobunshoin University (1983)
- Goddess (1985)
- Flower Monument (1986)
- Death of a Goddess (1987)
- A Restorative Energy: Okinawa's Place Within Asia (1987)
- Thoughts on Buddhist Peace: A Plea for the Wisdom to Avoid War (1987)
- Fish God (1989)
- Northwest Railroad (1989)
- Highlights of Okinawan Theater (1990)
- Echoes From the Afterlife (1992)
- Heroes of the Ryūkyū Kingdom (1992)
- The Season of the Ryūkyū Kingdom (1993)
- From the Day's End (1993)
- A Farewell to the Fuzhou Ryūkyū Hotel (1994)
- Halftime Okinawa (1994)
- 20 Days and Nights (1995)
- Burnt Wilderness (1995)
- Over the Ages: Collected Plays (1997)
- In Search of Light (1997)
- A Family That Sells Love (1998)
- The Finery of Water (2000)
- Pearl Road: Musical Dramas of the Ryūkyū Kingdom (2001)
- The Collected Works of Tatsuhiro Ōshiro (2002)
- Tsushima Maru (2005)
- Fateful Scenes: 100 Selected Tales (2007)
- The Vision of a Flower: Ryūkyūan Kumi Odori No. 10 (2007)
- To Futenma (2011)
- Northern Winds Blow: A Sequel to Ryūkyūan Kumi Odori No. 10 (2011)
- The Hills of Life: Selected Ryūkyūan Autobiographical Poems (2013)

=== Selected Kumi Odori ===
- Gods Beyond the Sea (Umi no Tenzakai)
- Escape, Marriage (Hingire, Niibichi)
- The Rainbow Over Madama Bridge (Madamamichi)
- Life in the Moonlight (Tsukiyo no Jinsei)
- The Vision of a Flower (Hana no Maboroshi)
