= Shinsuke =

- Gender: Male

Origin
- Origin: Japanese
- Meaning: Different meanings depending on the kanji used

Shinsuke (written: 真介, 真輔, 真佑, 信介, 信亮, 伸介, 晋介, 晋輔, 紳介, 紳助, 晋丞, 進介 or 慎介) is a masculine Japanese given name. Notable people with the name include:

- Shinsuke Ashida (芦田 伸介; 1914–1999), Japanese actor
- Beppu Shinsuke (別府 晋介; 1847–1877), Japanese samurai
- Shinsuke Kashiwagi (柏木 真介; born 1981), Japanese basketball player
- Shinsuke Kayama (香山 進介; born 1959), Japanese swimmer
- Shinsuke Mikimoto (御木本 伸介; 1931–2002), Japanese actor
- Shinsuke Nakamura (中邑 真輔; born 1980), Japanese professional wrestler and mixed martial artist
- Shinsuke Numata (沼田 真佑; born 1978), Japanese writer
- Shinsuke Ogawa (小川 紳介; 1935–1992), Japanese film director
- Shinsuke Ogura (小椋 真介; born 1980), Japanese baseball player
- Shinsuke Okuno (奥野 信亮; born 1944), Japanese politician
- Shinsuke Sakimoto (嵜本 晋輔; born 1982), Japanese footballer
- Shinsuke Sato (佐藤 信介; born 1970), Japanese film director, screenwriter and video game designer
- Shinsuke Shimada (島田 紳助; born 1956), Japanese comedian and television presenter
- Shinsuke Shiotani (塩谷 伸介; born 1970), Japanese footballer
- Shinsuke Suematsu (末松 信介; born 1955), Japanese politician
- Shinsuke Tayama (田山 真輔; born 1982), Japanese skeleton racer
- Shinsuke Yamanaka (山中 慎介; born 1982), Japanese boxer

== Fictional characters ==
- Shinsuke Kita (北 信介), a character from the manga and anime Haikyu!! with the position of wing spiker and the captain of Inarizaki High
- Shinsuke Takasugi (高杉 晋助) a character from the manga and anime Gintama
