= The Book of Tokyo =

2015 anthology of stories about Shanghai

The Book of Tokyo is an anthology of ten stories from various Japanese writers, edited by Michael Emmerich, Jim Hinks as well as Masashi Matsuie and published on 9 April 2015. It is the third book of the Reading the City series, focused on stories from and about a certain city, in this case Tokyo in Japan.

== Content ==
- Introduction by Michael Emmerich
- Model T Frankenstein by Hideo Furukawa, translated by Samuel Malissa
- Picnic by Kaori Ekuni, translated by Lydia Moed
- A House for Two by Mitsuyo Kakuta, translated by Hart Larrabee
- Mummy by Banana Yoshimoto, translated by Takami Nieda
- The Owl's Estate by Toshiyuka Horie, translated by Jonathan Lloyd-Davies
- Dad, I Love You by Nao-Cola Yamazaki, translated by Morgan Giles
- Mambo by Hitomi Kanchara, translated by Dan Bradley
- Vortex by Osamu Hashimoto, translated by Asa Yoneda
- The Hut on the Roof by Hiromi Kawakami, translated by Lucy Fraser
- An Elevator on Sunday by Shuichi Yoshida, translated by Ginny Tapley Takemori
- About the authors
- About the translators

== Reviews ==
David Evans wrote for The Independent, that "the characters’ habit of introspection gives these tales a hazy, dreamlike quality; the physical environment of Tokyo is rarely described directly. What gives them their sense of place is, rather, their shared sense of the ephemeral aspect to life in the big city – and the various pleasures and sadnesses it brings." Michelle Johnson wrote for World Literature Today, that the book is "an intriguing impression of what it’s like to come of age and face middle age in contemporary Tokyo." The Japan News wrote that the book "showcases the lesser-known diversity of the city’s people." Singapore Review of Books found the book "an enigmatic, yet elegant work of art." Asian Review of Books found it a "highly recommended short story collection, one that should be kept close at hand to reread."
