= Reiko Mori =

Reiko Mori may refer to:

- Reiko Mori, birth name of Noriko Sengoku (1922–2012), Japanese actress
- Reiko Mori (novelist) (1928–2014), Japanese novelist who won the 82nd Akutagawa Prize in 1979
- Reiko Mori (politician) (born 1968), Japanese politician who is serving in the Wakayama Prefectural Assembly

== See also ==
- Reiko Ōmori
