= Man Arai =

Japanese writer and singer (1946–2021)

- Born: 7 May 1946; Niigata, Occupation of Japan, Japan
- Died: 3 December 2021 (aged 75); Hakodate, Japan
- Occupations: Writer; Singer

Man Arai (Japanese: 新井満 Arai Man; 7 May 1946 – 3 December 2021) was a Japanese writer and singer. In 1987, he won the Noma Literary New Face Prize for Vexation and Akutagawa Prize in 1988 for Tazunebito no Jikan.
