= Masatsugu Ono =

Japanese writer

- 小野正嗣
- Born: 1970 (age 55–56)
- Writing career
- Language: Japanese
- Genre: Fiction
- Notable work: Kyūnen-mae no inori
- Notable awards: Mishima Yukio Prize (2002); Akutagawa Prize (2014)

Masatsugu Ono (小野 正嗣, Ono Masatsugu; born 1970) is a Japanese writer.

He resides in Ōita Prefecture and is associate professor at the Rikkyo University. He was awarded the 152nd Akutagawa Prize (for 2014, presented in 2015), for the novel Kyūnen-mae no inori ("A Prayer Nine Years Ago").

== Works in Translation ==
Novels

- Echo on the bay (にぎやかな湾に背負われた船, Nigiyaka na wan ni seowareta fune), translated by Angus Turvill, Two Lines Press, 2020. ISBN 9781949641035
- Lion cross point (獅子渡り鼻, Shishiwataribana), translated by Angus Turvill, Two Lines Press, 2018. ISBN 9781931883702

Short Stories

- Katachichi (片乳)
  - A breast, translated by Juliet Winters Carpenter, in At the edge of the wood, Strangers Press, 2017. ISBN 9781911343066
  - A breast, translated by Juliet Winters Carpenter, in At the edge of the woods, Two Lines Press, 2022. ISBN 9781949641288
- Mori no okashiya (森のお菓子屋)
  - The pastry shop at the edge of the wood, translated by Juliet Winters Carpenter, in At the edge of the wood, Strangers Press, 2017. ISBN 9781911343066
  - The cake shop in the woods, translated by Juliet Winters Carpenter, in At the edge of the woods, Two Lines Press, 2022. ISBN 9781949641288
- Furui kawa no fukuro (古い皮の袋)
  - The old leather bag, translated by Juliet Winters Carpenter, in At the edge of the woods, Two Lines Press, 2022. ISBN 9781949641288
- Nemuru kobu (眠る瘤)
  - The dosing gnarl, translated by Juliet Winters Carpenter, in At the edge of the woods, Two Lines Press, 2022. ISBN 9781949641288
