= Akiko Itoyama =

Japanese writer

- 絲山秋子
- Born: November 22, 1966 (age 59); Setagaya, Tokyo, Japan
- Education: Waseda University
- Occupations: Writer, novelist
- Writing career
- Language: Japanese
- Genre: Fiction
- Notable works: It's Only Talk; Oki de matsu
- Notable awards: Bungakukai New Face Prize; Akutagawa Prize; Kawabata Yasunari Prize; Tanizaki Prize

Akiko Itoyama (絲山秋子, Itoyama Akiko; born November 22, 1966) is a Japanese novelist. She has won the Akutagawa Prize, the Kawabata Yasunari Prize, and the Tanizaki Prize, and her work has been adapted for film.

== Biography ==
After graduation from Shinjuku High School and Waseda University, she worked as a saleswoman for a major household equipment company and, as is common in Japanese corporate life, was transferred several times to various localities. Treatment for cyclic psychosis led to her writing.

Her works, which focus on human relations, have been nominated for and received literary awards. She was recipient of the 96th Bungakukai New Face Award and a nominee for the 129th Akutagawa Prize for her first volume, It's Only Talk (イッツ・オンリー・トーク), in 2003. The book was later adapted into the 2005 Ryūichi Hiroki film It's Only Talk. Itoyama won the Akutagawa Prize in January 2006 for her short story "Oki de matsu". An English translation of her "Oki de matsu" appeared in the April 2007 issue of Words Without Borders under the title "Waiting in the Offing." Her book Tōbō kusotawake (逃亡くそたわけ, In Pursuit of Lavender) was adapted into a 2007 film starring Minami Hinase. An English version of the book, translated by Charles de Wolf, was published in 2013 under the title In Pursuit of Lavender.

An English translation of It's Only Talk was published by The Japan Times in March 2009. In 2010 her novel Bakamono (ばかもの, Fools) was adapted into a film by Shusuke Kaneko. In 2016 Itoyama won the 52nd Tanizaki Prize for her 2015 book Hakujō (薄情, Heartless).

She has been praised for her ability to describe provincial scenery and represent regional accents and dialects, reflecting the characters' image, even though she was brought up in Tokyo. She explains that she learned them through repeated company transfers all over Japan.

== Recognition ==
- 2004 55th MEXT Award for New Artists
- 2004 30th Kawabata Yasunari Prize
- 2006 134th Akutagawa Prize (2005下)
- 2016 52nd Tanizaki Prize

== Bibliography ==
=== Books in Japanese ===
- Ittsu onrī tōku (イッツ・オンリー・トーク, It's Only Talk), Bungeishunjū, 2004, ISBN 9784163226309 (won the 96th Bungakukai New Face Award, nominated for the 129th Akutagawa Prize)
- Umi no sennin (海の仙人, Sea Hermit), Shinchosha, 2004, ISBN 9784104669011 (nominated for the 130th Akutagawa Prize, also won the Minister of Education and Science's Art Encouragement Prize for New Artists, in book form)
- Fukurokōji no otoko (袋小路の男, Dead End Street Man), Kodansha, 2004, ISBN 9784062126182 (won the 30th Kawabata Yasunari Prize)
- Tōbō kusotawake (逃亡くそたわけ, In Pursuit of Lavender), Chuokoron Shinsha, 2005, ISBN 9784120036149 (nominated for the 133rd Naoki Prize and New Face Award of the 27th Noma Prize for Literature)
- Sumōru tōku (スモールトーク, Small Talk), Nigensha, 2005, ISBN 9784544040999
- Nīto (ニート), Kadokawa Shoten, 2005, ISBN 9784048736435
- Oki de matsu (沖で待つ, Waiting in the Offing), Bungeishunjū, 2006, ISBN 9784163248509 (won the 134th Akutagawa Prize)

- includes 勤労感謝の日 Kinrō kansha no hi (Labor Thanksgiving Day), nominated for the 131st Akutagawa Prize

- Bakamono (ばかもの, Fools), Shinchosha, 2008, ISBN 9784104669035
- Ririku (離陸, Takeoff), Bungeishunjū, 2014, ISBN 9784163901220
- Hakujō (薄情, Heartless), Shinchosha, 2015, ISBN 9784104669073

=== Selected works in English ===
- "Waiting in the Offing," trans. Charles de Wolf, Words Without Borders, April 2007 issue
- It's Only Talk, trans. Raquel Hill, The Japan Times, 2009, ISBN 9784789013475
- In Pursuit of Lavender, trans. Charles de Wolf, Anthem Press, 2013, ISBN 9780857280466
