= Eiko Matsumura =

Japanese novelist

Eiko Matsumura (松村栄子; born July 3, 1961) is a Japanese novelist. She is best known for her novel Abaton (至高聖所（アバトーン)) which won the Akutagawa Prize in 1991.

== Biography ==
Matsumura was born in Shizuoka, Japan on July 3, 1961. She graduated from Tsukuba University. After graduation, she worked at a computer software company and began writing fiction. Her first work, Boku wa Kagayaku Hime (僕はかぐや姫) was published in 1990, and was well-received by critics. It won the Kaien Award for New Writers and was nominated for the Mishima Yukio Prize.

Matsumura's next story, Abaton (至高聖所（アバトーン)) won the Akutagawa Prize in 1991.

== Selected works ==
- Boku wa Kagayaku Hime (僕はかぐや姫), 1990
- Abaton (至高聖所（アバトーン)), 1991
