= Fujino =

Fujino may refer to:

- Fujino (surname), a Japanese surname
- Fujino, Shizuoka, a region covering the southwestern foot of Mount Fuji, Japan
- Fujino, Kanagawa, a former town in Tsukui District, Kanagawa Prefecture, Japan
- Fujino Station, a railway station in Midori-ku, Sagamihara, Kanagawa Prefecture, Japan
