= Masaaki Tachihara =

Japanese writer (1926–1980)

Tachihara Masaaki
- 立原 正秋
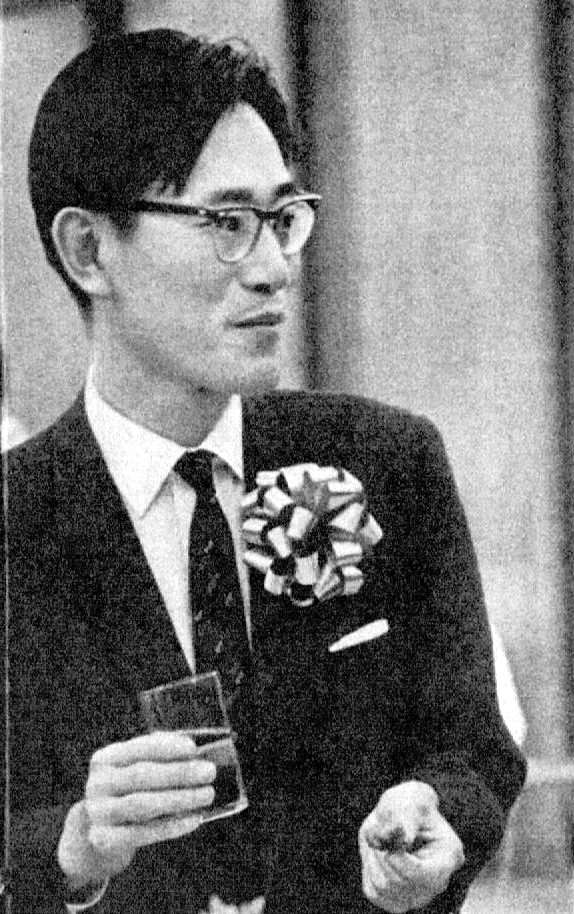
- Born: Kim Yun-kyu (김윤규); 6 January 1926; Andong city, Gyeongsangbuk-do province, Korea
- Died: 12 August 1980 (aged 54); Kamakura, Kanagawa, Japan
- Resting place: Zuisen-ji, Kamakura, Japan
- Education: Waseda University
- Occupation: Writer
- Writing career
- Language: Japanese
- Genres: novelist, poet, critic

Tachihara Masaaki (立原 正秋; 6 January 1926 – 12 August 1980) was the pen-name of a Japanese novelist, essayist, poet and literary critic of Korean descent, active during the Shōwa period.

== Early life ==
Tachihara was born in Andong city, Gyeongsangbuk-do province, Korea to Korean parents. His father was a member of the former Korean aristocracy and a military officer serving the Joseon Dynasty, who became a Zen priest after the Japanese annexation of Korea, and subsequently committed suicide when Tachihara was five.

Four years after his father's death in 1931, Tachihara moved with his mother to Yokosuka city, Kanagawa prefecture, Japan. His Korean name was Kim Yun Kyu (金胤奎: 김윤규), but he changed his name to Nomura Shintarō (野村 震太郎) when his mother married a Japanese man. Later, he registered his name as Kanai Masaaki under the soushi-kaimei policy, but after his own marriage (to a Japanese woman), he once again changed his name to Yonemoto Masaaki (米本 正秋). He has been naturalized in Japan in 1947.

He was a student at Waseda University in Tokyo, and was initially enrolled in the Law Department. However, he gradually shifted over the Literature Department, drawn by his interest in the novels of Yasunari Kawabata and the literary criticism of Hideo Kobayashi.

Tachihara was strongly attracted to medieval Japanese culture, particularly Noh drama, and traditional Japanese gardens, and his novels are patterned after the aesthetics in Zeami's Noh treatise Fushi Kaiden. Tachihara's interests included the collection of ceramics, especially many Korean Yi Dynasty works. It was not until after his death that his Korean ethnic background became widely known.

== Literary career ==
Tachihara's first novel, Bakushū (“Autumn Wheat”) was published in the literary magazine Bungei kenkyūkai. It was well received by literary critics, which led to his decision to become a professional writer. In 1958, he published Tanin no jiyū (“Other People's Freedom”) in the magazine Gunzō, followed by Takigi nō (“Firelight Noh”), Tsurugigasaki (“Cape Tsurugi”) and Urushi no hana (“Lacquer Flower”).

He won the 55th Naoki Award for his novel Shiroi keshi (“White Poppy”, 1965). He also declined the Akutagawa Prize twice, as he felt that the reward would damage his reputation as an author of serious literature.

One of his books, Wind and Stone, has been translated into English by Stephen W. Kohl.

Tachihara lived in Kamakura, Kanagawa prefecture from 1950 until his death of esophageal cancer. Before he died, he officially changed his name to Tachihara Masaaki. His grave is at the temple of Zuisen-ji in Kamakura.

== Works in translation ==
- Cliff's edge, and other stories. Translated by Stephen W. Kohl. Midwest Publishers, 1980. ISBN 9780936208008. Contains the following short stories:
  - Cliff's edge (Translation of: 剣ヶ崎 Tsurugigasaki)
  - The archer (Translation of: 流鏑馬 Yabusame)
  - Torchlight nō (Translation of: 薪能 Takiginō)
- Wind and stone. Translated by Stephen W. Kohl. Stone Bridge Press, 1992. ISBN 9780962813771 (Translation of: 夢は枯野を Yume wa kareno o)

== See also ==
- Lee Hoesung, first Zainichi Korean winner of the Akutagawa Prize
- Japanese literature
- List of Japanese authors
