= Nobuo Kojima =

Japanese writer

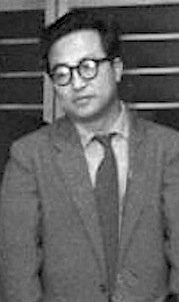
A picture of Nobuo Kojima

Nobuo Kojima (小島 信夫, Kojima Nobuo; February 28, 1915 – October 26, 2006) was a Japanese writer prominent in the postwar era. He is most readily associated with other writers of his generation, such as Shōtarō Yasuoka, who describe the effects of Japan's defeat in World War II on the country's psyche.

From an early age, Kojima read a wide variety of literature, both Japanese and Western, and such writers as Nikolai Gogol, Franz Kafka, and Fyodor Dostoevsky had a strong influence on his work. In addition to his fiction, he had a long career as a professor of English literature at Meiji University in Tokyo, publishing criticism and making translations of many major American writers, including Dorothy Parker, Irwin Shaw, and Bernard Malamud.

== Selected works ==
Year	Japanese Title	English Title
1948	汽車の中; Kisha no Naka	In a Train
1952	小銃; Shoujuu	The Rifle
1954	アメリカン・スクール; Amerikan Sukuuru	The American School
1965	抱擁家族; Houyou Kazoku	Embracing Family

== Awards ==
- 1954 Akutagawa Prize – American School (Amerikan sukūru 「アメリカン・スクール」)
- 1970 Tanizaki Prize – Embracing Family (Hōyō kazoku, 「抱擁家族」)
