= Tetsushi Suwa =

Japanese writer

Tetsushi Suwa (諏訪哲史, Suwa Tetsuhi, born 1969) is a Japanese writer from Nagoya, Aichi. He was awarded the 137th Akutagawa Prize in 2007 for Asatte no Hito (アサッテの人, "The person of the day after tomorrow").

== Early life ==
Suwa was born in Nagoya in 1969, and grew up both there and in Sendai. He graduated from the Department of Philosophy, Faculty of Letters, Kokugakuin University in Tokyo.

== Writing career ==
Suwa’s debut novel, Asatte no hito (アサッテの人, Lit. The Day-after-tomorrow Man, usually translated into English as “A Distracted Man”) gained him immediate interest, winning the 137th Akutagawa Prize for 2007. The novel was first published in the literary magazine Gunzo, and won the magazine’s Gunzo Prize for New Writers the same year.

Since then, Suwa has gone on to publish several other novels.

== Works ==
=== Asatte no hito ===
Asatte no hito (A Distracted Man) was Suwa’s debut novel. The title refers to the protagonist, an eccentric middle-aged man who is constantly distracted and lives his life outside of the usual rules of society. The narrator is the protagonists nephew, an author, who has to solve the mystery of his uncle’s disappearance, having decided to write a book about it. The novel uses an epistolary metafictional form, combining various in-world texts to tell the story.

== Bibliography ==
- Asatte no hito (アサッテの人). Kōdansha, 2007, ISBN 978-4-06-214214-4
- Risun (りすん). Kōdansha, 2008, ISBN 978-4-06-214643-2
- Lombardia enkei (ロンバルディア遠景). Kōdansha, 2009, ISBN 978-4-06-215548-9
- Ryōdo (領土). Shinchōsha, 2011, ISBN 978-4-10-331381-6, Kurzgeschichtensammlung
- Suwa-shi monjū (スワ氏文集). Kōdansha, 2012, ISBN 978-4-06-218109-9
- Hen-ai zōshoshitsu (偏愛蔵書室). Kokushokankōkai, 2014, ISBN 978-4-33-605828-7
- Gan-yen no Joō (岩塩の女王). Shinchosha, 2017, ISBN 978-4-10-331382-3

== Translations ==
Asatte no hito has been translated into Norwegian under the title En hinsides mann (A man beyond).
