= It's Only Talk =

- It's Only Talk film poster
- Directed by: Ryūichi Hiroki
- Written by: Akiko Itoyama (original book); Haruhiko Arai (screenplay)
- Produced by: Akira Morishige
- Starring: Shinobu Terajima; Etsushi Toyokawa; Akira Emoto; Shunsuke Matsuoka; Nao Omori; Tomorowo Taguchi; Satoshi Tsumabuki
- Cinematography: Kazuhiro Suzuki
- Edited by: Junichi Kikuchi
- Music by: Nido
- Distributed by: Gold View Co., Ltd (international)
- Release dates: November 23, 2005 (Tokyo FILMeX); June 10, 2006 (Japan)
- Running time: 126 minutes
- Country: Japan
- Language: Japanese

It's Only Talk (Japanese: やわらかい生活, Hepburn: Yawarakai Seikatsu) is a 2005 Japanese film directed by Ryūichi Hiroki, based on the prize-winning novel of the same title written by Akiko Itoyama.

== Plot summary ==
Yuko, is 35 years old; unemployed, single and is on medication to combat manic depression. There are a number of men in Yuko's life:

- her college friend, Homma, now a member of parliament;
- K, a confessed pervert who she meets on the Internet;
- Yasuda, a manic depressive young gang member;
- Soichi, Yuko's cousin who separated from his wife and child, and was also dumped by his mistress.

Yuko seems to create a different persona depending on whom she is talking to at the time. By the end of the movie, Yuko knows that she needs more than what Soichi and the other men in her life can give her. We all need a soft life—the literal meaning of "Yawarakai Seikatsu"—once in a while, but as Yuko discovers, there's also something to be said for this hard thing called reality.

== Cast ==
- Shinobu Terajima as Yuko.
- Etsushi Toyokawa as Shoichi, Yuko's cousin.
- Shunsuke Matsuoka as Homma, Yuko's friend.
- Tomorowo Taguchi as "K", an architect and self-confessed pervert.
- Satoshi Tsumabuki as Noboru, a manic depressive gang member, whom Yuko meets him through the Internet.

== Awards ==
Award	Date	Category	Result	Ref(s)
Brisbane International Film Festival	2005	FIPRESCI Award	Won	
Singapore International Film Festival	2006	Grand Prize	Won	
Barcelona Asian Film Festival	2006	Audience Award	Won	
