= Motoyoshi Shimizu =

Japanese novelist and poet (1918–2008)

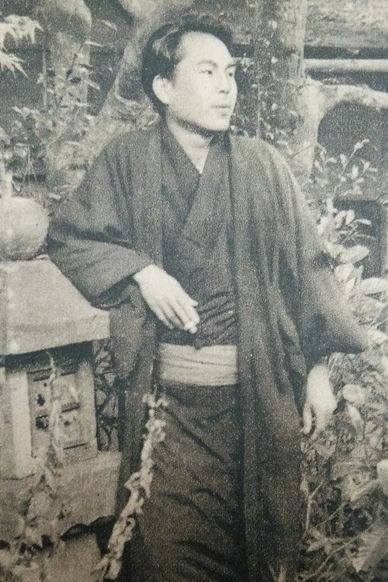
- Shimizu Motoyoshi in 1947
- Born: August 31, 1918; Shibuya, Tokyo, Japan
- Died: March 30, 2008 (aged 89); Kamakura, Kanagawa, Japan
- Writing career
- Notable work: Karitachi
- Notable awards: Akutagawa Prize for Karitachi

Motoyoshi Shimizu (清水 基吉, Shimizu Motoyoshi; August 31, 1918 – March 30, 2008) was the pen name of a Japanese novelist and poet, active during the Shōwa and Heisei periods of Japan. His real name was Shimizu Motoyoshi (清水基嘉), pronounced the same, but written in different kanji.

== Biography ==
Shimizu was born in Shibuya, Tokyo, and attended the Seisoku Eigo Gakko in Kanda. From 1938 to 1941, he travelled around the country, and met noted author Riichi Yokomitsu in 1940 under whom he studied fiction writing. His first work, Tsuru (“Crane”) published in 1941 caught the attention of noted poet Ishida Hakyo, who took him on as a student. In 1944, his novel Karitachi (“Wild Geese”) was awarded the prestigious Akutagawa Prize.

His output was prolific in the post-war years, and he also turned towards literary criticism, particularly on poetry. From 1991 to 2004, he was director of the Kamakura Museum of Literature, which he had helped create. He died in 2008 of prostate cancer.
