= Natsuko Kuroda =

Japanese writer (born 1937)

- 黒田 夏子
- Born: 1937 (age 88–89); Tokyo, Japan
- Education: Waseda University
- Occupation: Writer
- Writing career
- Language: Japanese
- Genres: Fiction, short story
- Notable work: a b sango
- Notable awards: Akutagawa Prize; Waseda Bungaku New Writer Prize; Yomiuri Shimbun Short Story Newcomer Prize

Natsuko Kuroda (黒田 夏子, Kuroda Natsuko; born 1937) is a Japanese writer. At the age of 75, she won the 148th Akutagawa Prize, making Kuroda the oldest winner in the history of the prize.

== Biography ==
Kuroda was born in 1937 in Tokyo, Japan, and attended Waseda University. While at Waseda University she started the journal Sajo (Sandcastles), where she published her fiction. She graduated from Waseda University with a degree in Japanese, then worked various jobs as a teacher, administrator, and copy editor while continuing to write fiction.

== Career ==
In 1963, her story "Mari" ("Ball") won the 63rd Yomiuri Shimbun Short Story Newcomer Prize. For decades, Kuroda wrote stories that were published but did not win recognition in the form of literary awards. In 2012, nearly fifty years after her previous literary award, Kuroda won the Waseda Bungaku new writer competition for her experimental story a b sango, which was written mostly in hiragana rather than kanji, composed horizontally rather than vertically, and used no names or pronouns. The next year, a b sango won the 148th Akutagawa Prize, making Kuroda, at the age of 75, the oldest winner in the prize's history. The Akutagawa Prize committee was not unanimous in its decision, but committee members commended Kuroda's experimental style. In 2013, her story Kanjutai no odori, which she had written many years before a b sango, was published in book form.

== Recognition ==
- 1963: Yomiuri Shimbun Short Story Newcomer Prize
- 2012: Waseda Bungaku New Writer Prize
- 2013: 148th Akutagawa Prize (2012下)

== Bibliography ==
=== Books in Japanese ===
- Ruiseitai meijaku, Shinbisha, 2010, ISBN 9784788331365
- a b sango, Waseda Bungakkai, 2013, OCLC 862829243
- Kanjutai no odori : sanbyakugojūban, Bungeishunjū, 2013, ISBN 9784163828404

=== Selected work in English ===
- "From Ball", translated by Angus Turvill, Comparative Critical Studies, 2015
- "Waymarkers", translated by Asa Yoneda, Words Without Borders, 2015
