= Tamaki Daido =

Japanese writer

- 大道 珠貴
- Born: 1966 (age 59–60); Fukuoka, Japan
- Occupations: Novelist, essayist
- Writing career
- Language: Japanese
- Genres: Fiction; Short story; Essay
- Notable works: Hadaka; Shoppai doraibu; Kizuguchi ni wa uokka
- Notable awards: Kyushu Arts Festival Literary Prize; Bunkamura Deux Magots Literary Prize; Akutagawa Prize

Tamaki Daido (大道 珠貴, Daidō Tamaki; born 1966) is a Japanese writer. She has won the Kyushu Arts Festival Literary Prize, the Bunkamura Deux Magots Literary Prize, and the Akutagawa Prize.

== Early life and education ==
Daido was born in Fukuoka, Japan and graduated from Fukuoka Central High School. Her father worked for the Japan Self-Defense Forces. She worked as a radio scriptwriter for several years before focusing on writing novels.

== Career ==
In 2000 her first published story Hadaka (裸, Naked) won the Kyushu Arts Festival Literary Prize and was nominated for the Akutagawa Prize, but did not win. Two years later, after three more Akutagawa Prize nominations, Daido won the 128th Akutagawa Prize for Shoppai doraibu (しょっぱいドライブ, Salty Drive), a novel about a relationship between a younger woman and older man. In 2005 Taeko Tomioka selected Daido as the winner of the Bunkamura Deux Magots Literary Prize for Kizuguchi ni wa uokka (傷口にはウオッカ, Vodka for Wounds). An English translation of her short story "Milk" was published in the 2006 anthology "Inside" and Other Short Fiction. Since 2011 Daido has contributed a regular column to the Asahi Shimbun.

Daido has never married, and has claimed that marriage, children, or any particular sexual preference would constrain her ability to live her own life.

== Recognition ==
- 2000 30th Kyushu Arts Festival Literary Prize
- 2003 128th Akutagawa Prize (2002下)
- 2005 Bunkamura Deux Magots Literary Prize

== Works ==
=== In Japanese ===
- Somuko ko (背く子), Kodansha, 2001, ISBN 9784062102957
- Hadaka (裸, Naked), Bungeishunjū, 2002, ISBN 9784163213408
- Shoppai doraibu (しょっぱいドライブ, Salty Drive), Bungeishunjū, 2003, ISBN 9784163217604
- Gin no sara ni kin no ringo o (銀の皿に金の林檎を), Futabasha, 2003, ISBN 9784575234664
- Hisashiburi ni sayõnara (ひさしぶりにさようなら), Kodansha, 2003, ISBN 9784062119269
- Miruku (ミルク, Milk), Chuokoron-Shinsha, 2004, ISBN 9784120035685
- Suteki (素敵, Lovely), Kobunsha, 2004, ISBN 9784334924485
- Kizuguchi ni wa uokka (傷口にはウオッカ, Vodka for Wounds), Kodansha, 2005, ISBN 9784062127387
- Tama tama-- (たまたま--), Asahi Shimbunsha, 2005, ISBN 9784022500212
- Ushiromuki de arukō (後ろ向きで步こう), Bungeishunjū, 2005, ISBN 9784163241807
- Hana to umi (ハナとウミ), Futabasha, 2005, ISBN 9784575235357
- Kesaran pasaran (ケセランパサラン), Shōgakukan, 2006, ISBN 9784093861700
- Chõ ka ga ka (蝶か蛾か, Butterfly or Moth?), Bungeishunjū, 2006, ISBN 9784163256009
- Oni ga kita (オニが来た), Kobunsha, 2007, ISBN 9784334925352
- Shokkingu pinku (ショッキングピンク, Shocking Pink), Kodansha, 2007, ISBN 9784062142427
- Rippa ni narimashitaka (立派になりましたか?), Futabasha, 2008, ISBN 9784575236019
- Kireigoto (きれいごと), Bungeishunjū, 2011, ISBN 9784163810508
- Bonnō no ko (煩悩の子), Futabasha, 2015, ISBN 9784575238990

=== In English ===
- "Milk", trans. Louise Heal Kawai, "Inside" and Other Short Fiction, 2006
