= Makoto Furukawa (writer) =

Japanese writer

Makoto Furukawa (Japanese: 古川真人) is a Japanese writer. In January 2020, he won the 162nd Akutagawa Prize for his book Seitaka Awadachisō.
