= Rie Qudan =

Japanese novelist (born 1990)

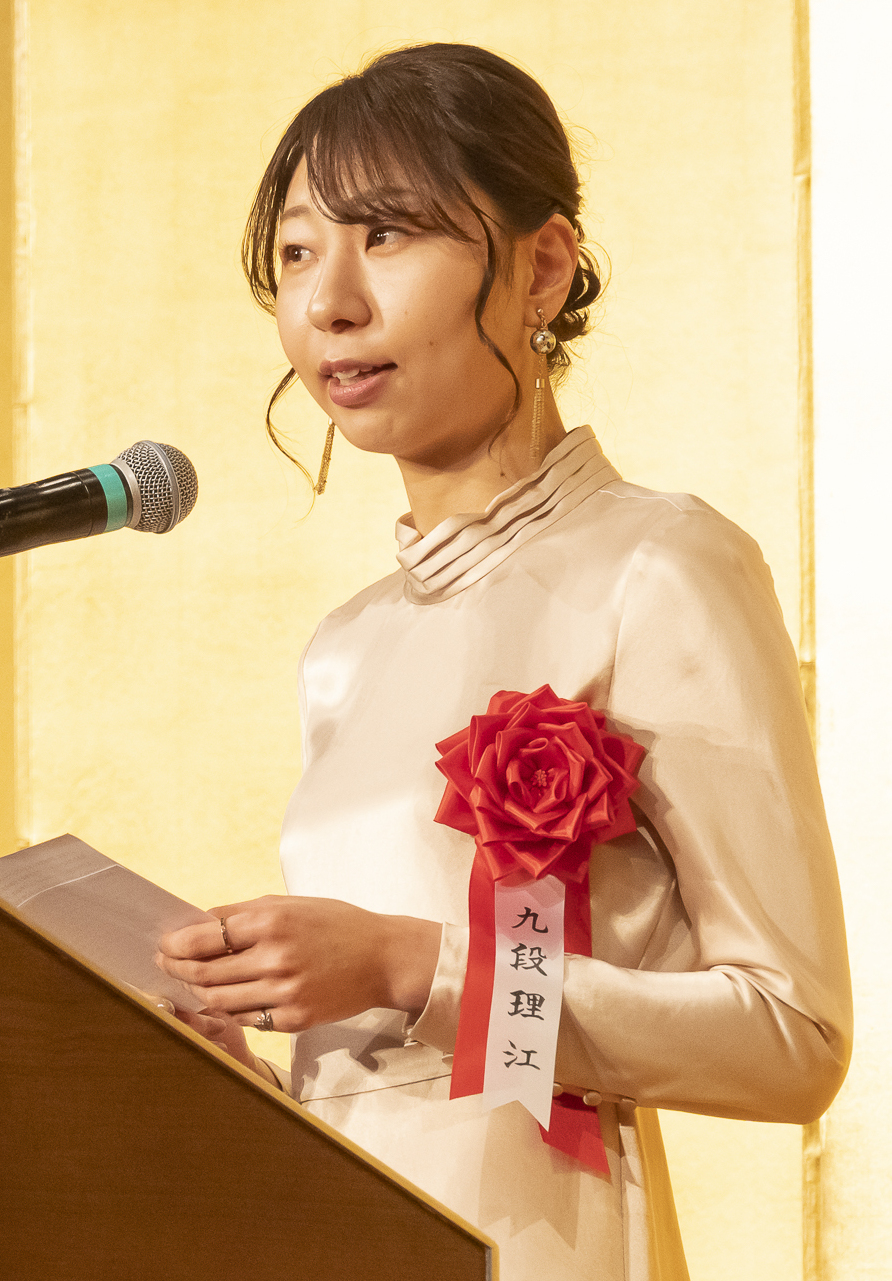
Qudan in 2023

Rie Qudan (Note: Japanese: 九段理江, romanized: Kudan Rie) or Rie Kudan (born September 27, 1990, in Saitama, Japan) is a Japanese novelist. In 2024, Qudan won the 170th Akutagawa Prize for her novel Tōkyō-to Dōjō Tō (Note: Japanese: 東京都同情塔) ("Tokyo Sympathy Tower").

== Early life and education ==
Qudan was born on September 27, 1990, in Urawa (now Saitama) in Saitama Prefecture, Japan.

She won her first writing award for an essay she wrote during sixth grade in elementary school.

== Career ==
Qudan worked as a laboratory assistant after graduation from university.

In 2021, Qudan won the 126th Bungakukai Newcomer Award with her debut novel, Warui Ongaku (Note: Japanese: 悪い音楽) ("Bad music").

Warui Ongaku and Schoolgirl were translated into English by Haydn Trowell and published by Gazebo Books in March 2025 in a volume titled Schoolgirl.

Her 2024 novel Tōkyō-to Dōjō Tō ("Tokyo sympathy tower") is a science fiction story about an architect who designs a tower to be built in Tokyo's Shinjuku Gyo-en garden and used as a prison to rehabilitate criminals comfortably. Set in a version of Tokyo in the near future where Zaha Hadid's unrealized version of the National Stadium for the Tokyo Olympics would have been built, the story is told from the perspective of the architect and her would-be biographer. The novel contains themes concerning artificial intelligence.

Tōkyō-to Dōjō Tō won Qudan the 170th Akutagawa Prize, one of Japan's most prestigious literary awards for new authors. During a press conference, Qudan mentioned that she used ChatGPT, a chatbot based on generative artificial intelligence, to write about 5% of her novel. (Note: Some sources reported that she made the statement during the award ceremony, while The Asahi Shimbun noted that the award ceremony was scheduled to take place in February.) She later clarified that AI was only used to write the AI's dialogue in the novel.

Upon its English-language release, Tōkyō-to Dōjō Tō ("Tokyo Sympathy Tower") was described by David Vernon writing in The Spectator as 'a lyrical, witty, satirical but meditative and meticulous text', one that 'feels so über-zeitgeisty that it might have been written this morning ... Yet it is far more than merely topical or trendy, as deep moral, political, social, cultural, architectural and lingual problems collide, merge and inform (on) each other throughout'.

== Works in English ==
- Sympathy Tower Tokyo. Translated by Jesse Kirkwood. Simon and Schuster. 2025-09-02. ISBN 978-1-6680-9412-9.

== Personal life ==
Qudan lives in Chiba Prefecture.
