= Mieko Takizawa =

Japanese novelist

Mieko Takizawa (瀧澤美恵子; March 1, 1939–August 9, 2020) was a Japanese novelist. She was best known for her 1989 work Nekobaba no iru Machi de (ネコババのいる町で), which won the Akutagawa Prize.

== Biography ==
Takizawa was born Mieko Okamoto in Niigata prefecture, Japan on March 1, 1939. She studied Chinese at the Tokyo University of Foreign Studies, but did not graduate. Instead, she worked a few part-time jobs before being hired for a position at Marsh McLennan. She married Atsushi Takizawa in 1980, and left her job to become a housewife. She began writing at this time. Her first novel, Nekobaba no iru Machi de (ネコババのいる町で), won the Bungakukai Newcomers Award and the Akutagawa Prize.

Takizawa died on August 9, 2020.

== Critical reception ==
Researcher Sachiko Schierbeck wrote that Takizawa's stories deal with the contradictory nature of human life, and observes them without judgement. She notes, however, that some of Takizawa's characters strain the suspension of disbelief.

== Selected works ==
- Nekobaba no iru Machi de (ネコババのいる町で), 1989
- Yūgao no Yado (夕顔の宿), 1991
- Dontsuku Hayashi (ドンツク囃子), 1995
- Hiren Kirubeshi (悲恋斬るべし), 1995
- Butai ura (舞台裏)
