= Kyoko Hayashi =

Japanese writer (1930–2017)

Kyōko Hayashi (林 京子, Hayashi Kyōko; 28 August 1930 – 19 February 2017) was a Japanese writer associated with the Atomic Bomb Literature genre.

== Biography ==
Hayashi was born in Nagasaki and spent the years from 1931 to 1945 with her family in Shanghai. She returned to Nagasaki in 1945 and enrolled in Nagasaki Girls' High School, where she was mobilized in the Mitsubishi Munitions Factory. She was working at the factory when the atomic bomb destroyed Nagasaki on August 9, 1945. Hayashi was seriously ill for two months, and suffered afterwards from fragile health. She later studied nursing in a special course the Welfare Faculty for Women attached to the Nagasaki Medical School, but left before graduation. She started to write in 1962.

In 1967, her story Procession on a Cloudy Day (Kumoribi no kōshin) was published in Bungei Shuto. She first drew wide attention in 1975 with an autobiographical story about the bombing, Ritual of Death (Matsuri no ba), which received that year's Akutagawa Prize. Two Grave Markers (Futari No Bohyō), also based on her experiences in the bombing, was published that same year. Her works in the 1970s include a collection of twelve short stories titled Giyaman bīdoro ("Cut glass, blown glass"), containing The Empty Can (Aki kan) and Yellow Sand (Kousa), both first published in 1978.

In 1980, Hayashi published her first full-length novel, Naki ga gotoki ("As if nothing had happened"), with a semi-autobiographical lead character. The Nagasaki theme continued through the 1980s with her collections Sangai no ie ("Home in the three worlds"), which won in 1984 the Kawabata Yasunari Literature Prize, and Michi ("The Path"). Her work Yasurakani ima wa nemuri tamae won the 1990 Tanizaki Prize. Hayashi lived near Washington, D.C. from 1985 to 1988.

== Selected works ==
- Matsuri no ba (Ritual of death), Tokyo: Kodansha, 1975.
- Shanhai, Tōkyō : Chūō Kōronsha, 1983.
- Sangai no ie (三界の家), Tōkyō : Shinchōsha, 1984.
- Michi (道), Tōkyō : Bungei Shunju, 1985.
- Tanima (谷間), Tōkyō : Kōdansha, 1988.
- Rinbu (輪舞), Tōkyō : Shinchōsha, 1989.
- Yasuraka ni ima wa nemuritamae (やすらかに今はねむり給え), Tōkyō : Kōdansha, 1990.
- Seishun (青春), Tōkyō : Shinchōsha, 1994.
- Bājinia no aoi sora (ヴァージニアの蒼い空), Tōkyō : Nihon Tosho Sentā, 2005.
- Matsuri no ba. Giyaman bīdoro (祭の場. ギヤマン ビードロ), Tōkyō : Nihon Tosho Sentā, 2005.
- Missheru no kuchibeni (ミッシェルの口紅. 上海), Tōkyō : Nihon Tosho Sentā, 2005.
- Nagai jikan o kaketa ningen no keiken (長い時間をかけた人間の経験), Tōkyō : Nihon Tosho Sentā, 2005.
- Rinbu. Kashi no ki no tēburu (輪舞. 樫の木のテーブル), Tōkyō : Nihon Tosho Sentā, 2005.
- Sangai no ie. Michi (三界の家. 道), Tōkyō : Nihon Tosho Sentā, 2005.
- Shizen o kou. Shunkan no kioku (自然を恋う. 瞬間の記憶), Tōkyō : Nihon Tosho Sentā, 2005.
- Yasuraka ni ima wa nemuritamae. Seishun (やすらかに今はねむり給え. 青春), Tōkyō : Nihon Tosho Sentā, 2005.

== Awards ==
- 1975 Akutagawa Prize for Ritual of Death (Matsuri no ba)
- 1983 Kawabata Prize for Sangai no ie ("Home in the three worlds")
- 1990 Tanizaki Prize for Yasurakani ima wa nemuri tamae (やすらかに今はねむり給え)
- 2000 Noma Literary Prize for Nagai zikan o kaketa ningen no keiken
- 2005 Asahi Prize for 林京子全集

== Selected works in English translation ==
- The Empty Can, trans. Margaret Mitsutani, in Atomic Aftermath: Short Stories about Hiroshima and Nagasaki, ed. Kenzaburo Oe. Tokyo: Shueisha, 1984; Fire from the Ashes: Japanese Stories about Hiroshima and Nagasaki, London: Readers International, 1985; The Crazy Iris and Other Stories of the Atomic Aftermath, New York: Grove Press, 1985. pp. 127–143.
- From Trinity to Trinity, trans. Eiko Otake, Station Hill, NY: Station Hill Press, 2010.
- Procession on a Cloudy Day, trans. Hirosuke Kashiwagi, Bulletin of Concerned Asian Scholars 25.1 (1993), pp. 58–69.
- Ritual of Death, trans. Kyoko Selden, Japan Interpreter 12 Winter（1978, pp. 54–93. Anthologized in Nuke Rebuke: Writers and Artists against Nuclear Energy and Weapons, ed. Marty Sklar, Iowa City: The Spirit That Moves Us Press, 1984. pp. 21–57.
- Two Grave Markers, trans. Kyoko Selden, The Bulletin of Concerned Asian Scholars 18.1 January–March (1986): pp. 23–35. Anthologized in The Atomic Bomb Voices from Hiroshima and Nagasaki, eds. Kyoko and Mark Selden, An East Gate Book, New York: M.E. Sharpe, 1989. pp. 24–54.
- Yellow Sand, trans. Kyoko Selden, in Japanese Women Writers: Twentieth Century Short Fiction, 1991. pp. 207–216.
