= Akiko Akazome =

Japanese writer

- 瀬野 晶子
- Born: October 31, 1974; Kyoto Prefecture, Japan
- Died: September 18, 2017 (aged 42); Uji, Kyoto Prefecture, Japan
- Education: Kyoto University of Foreign Studies; Hokkaido University
- Occupation: Writer
- Writing career
- Pen name: 赤染 晶子
- Language: Japanese
- Genre: Fiction
- Notable work: Otome no mikkoku
- Notable awards: Akutagawa Prize; Bungakukai Prize

Akiko Akazome (赤染 晶子, Akazome Akiko), born Akiko Seino (瀬野 晶子, Seino Akiko), was a Japanese writer. Akazome won the 143rd Akutagawa Prize and the 99th Bungakukai Prize before her death in 2017.

== Biography ==
Akazome graduated from the Kyoto University of Foreign Studies, where she studied German, in 1996. She entered graduate school at Hokkaido University intending to become an academic, but instead started writing stories that reflected her Kyoto upbringing.

In 2004 Akazome won the 99th Bungakukai Prize for her story "Hatsuko-san," which was later published in book form as Utsutsu utsura (うつつ・うつら). Her 2010 book Otome no mikkoku (乙女の密告, The Maiden's Betrayal), about a group of women in a German class reading Anne Frank's The Diary of a Young Girl, generated controversy for using a casual writing style to discuss serious subject matter. Otome no mikkoku won the 143rd Akutagawa Prize, with the selection committee praising the use of humor to discuss social problems. The next year her book Uonteddo kaijin nijūichimensō (WANTED!!かい人21面相) was published by Bungeishunjū. It was nominated for the Oda Sakunosuke Prize.

Akazome died of acute pneumonia in 2017 at the age of 42.

== Recognition ==
- 2004 99th Bungakukai Prize
- 2010 143rd Akutagawa Prize (2010上)

== Works ==
- Utsutsu utsura (うつつ・うつら), Bungeishunjū, 2007, ISBN 9784163259307
- Otome no mikkoku (乙女の密告, The Maiden's Betrayal), Shinchosha, 2010, ISBN 9784103276616
- Uonteddo kaijin nijūichimensō (WANTED!!かい人21面相), Bungeishunjū, 2011, ISBN 9784163807409

== See also ==
- List of Japanese women writers
