= Hikaru Okuizumi =

Japanese novelist (born 1956)

- Born: 6 February 1956 (age 70); Mikawa, Yamagata Prefecture, Japan
- Occupation: novelist

Hikaru Okuizumi (奥泉 光, Okuizumi Hikaru), born Yasuhiro Okuizumi (奥泉康弘) 6 February 1956, is a Japanese novelist. His real name is Yasuhiro Okuizumi.

== Biography ==
Okuizumi was born in Mikawa, Yamagata Prefecture, and attended high school in Saitama Prefecture, before studying Humanities at ICU in Tokyo. He completed a master's course at the same university, but dropped out midway through his doctoral course. In 1993, he won the Noma Literary Prize for New Writers for the novel, Novalis no Inyō, and the Akutagawa Prize for The Stones Cry Out the following year. The Stones Cry Out has been translated into a number of languages including English and French. Okuizumi started working at Kinki University in 1999, and continues to teach there.

== Awards ==
- Noma Literary Prize for New Writers (1993)
- Akutagawa Prize (1994)
- Noma Literary Prize (2009)
- Tanizaki Prize (2014) for Tōkyō jijoden

== Selected works ==
- Novalis no Inyō (1993)
- The Stones Cry Out (Japanese title: Ishi no Raireki) (1993)
- Banal na Genshō (1994)
- Wagahai wa Neko de Aru Satsujin Jiken (1996)
- Plato Gakuen (1997)
- Grand Mystery (1998)
- Chōrui Gakusha no Fantasy (2001)
- The New Journey to the Center of the Earth (2002–2003)
- Modaru na Jishō (2005)
- Shinki: Gunkan "Kashihara" Satsujin Jiken (2009)
- Shuman no yubi (2010)
- Kuwagata Kōichi Junkyōju no sutairisshu na seikatsu (2011)
- Chi no tori ten no gyogun (2011年9月 幻戯書房)
- Kiiroi mizugi no nazo: kuwagata kōichi junkyōju no sutairisshu na seikatsu 2 (2012)
- Chūju ongakushū (2012)
- Mefisutoferesu no teiri: Jigoku sheikusupia sanbusaku (2013)
- Tōkyō jijoden (2014)
