= Tetsuo Miura =

Japanese writer, including novelist (1931–2010)

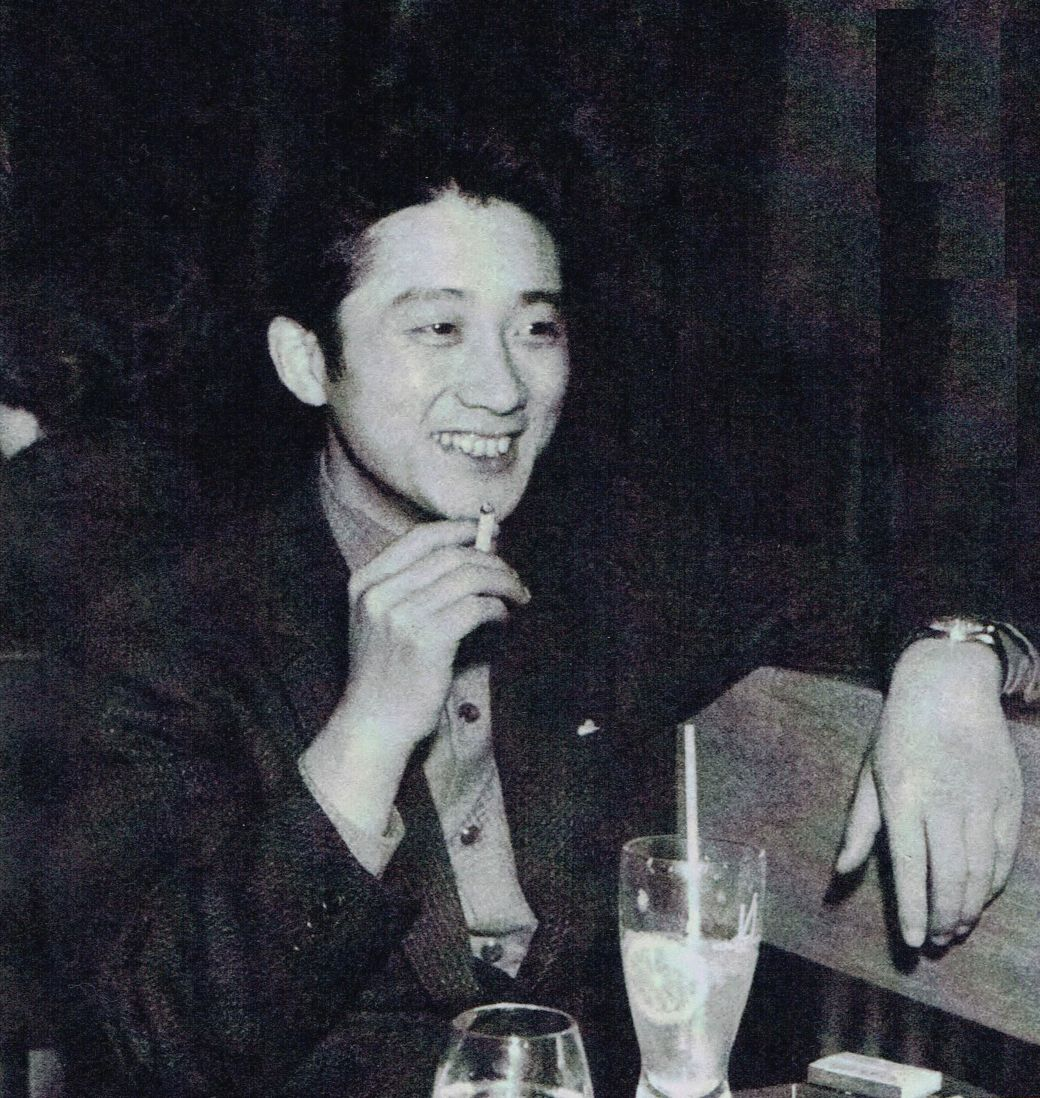
Tetsuo Miura (1961)

Tetsuo Miura (三浦 哲郎, Miura Tetsuo; 16 March 1931 – 29 August 2010) was a Japanese writer.

== Biography ==
Miura was born on 16 March 1931, in Hachinohe, Aomori Prefecture, the youngest of six children. His family ran a kimono shop in downtown Hachinohe under the name Marusan (丸三). On the day of his sixth birthday, his second-oldest sister committed suicide by jumping off a ferry in the Tsugaru Strait after failing a college-entrance examination. The following year, his older brother committed suicide with sleeping pills. In 1984, Miura recounted these events in 白夜を旅する人々 (Hakuya o tabisuru hitobito), for which he received the Jirō Osaragi Award.

After graduating from Hachinohe, he began studying economics at Waseda University (located in Shinjuku, Tokyo) in 1949. The following year, his second-eldest brother, who had financed his studies, disappeared without a trace. Miura was then forced to abandon his studies. He worked as a sports and English teacher at the local middle school. Miura then began his first attempts at writing.

In 1953, the family moved to the nearby city of Ichinohe, and Miura resumed his studies at Waseda University, this time in romance studies. He founded the literary magazine The Soulless (非情, Hijō) with some classmates. During his studies in 1955, his work and publications in this magazine earned him his first literary prize, the Shinchō Dōjinzasshi Shō (新潮同人雑誌賞) from Shinchōsha, for his story 'Jugosai no Shui'. The novelist and essayist Masuji Ibuse praised him.

In 1956, a year before his graduation, he married Tokuko Ebisawa, with whom he had three daughters.

Years of poverty followed until he found a job at a public-relations agency in 1960 and published the novel The Secret River (Shinobugawa) in the literary magazine Shinchō that same year. A year later, this novel received the Akutagawa Prize. In 1972, his novel Shinobugawa was made into a film by director Kei Kumai with Komaki Kurihara and Gō Katō in the lead roles.

After this breakthrough, Miura published tirelessly in the following years. For his children's book Yuta to Fushigina Nakamatachi, published in 1971, he was praised by literary critics. For his novel Kenjū to jūgo no tampen (拳銃と十五の短篇), he received the Noma Award in 1976. In 1977, a musical based on Yuta and His Wonderful Companions (Yuta to Fushigi na Nakamatachi) was staged by the Shiki Theatre Society (劇団四季).

In 1982, he published a historical novel Hymn to These Young People. In it, he describes a historical event that occurred in the 16th century : at the instigation of the Jesuit Alessandro Valignano, a Christian delegation of four men was sent to Rome. They traveled for two years from 1582 to 1584 via Macau, Malaga, St. Helena, Lisbon to Rome, where they were received by Pope Gregory XIII. The delegation returned to Japan in 1590 with a Gutenberg printing press.

In addition to his work as a writer, he was also a member of the selection committee for the Akutagawa Prize from 1984 to 2003 and a member of the Japan Academy of Arts since 1988. In 2001, Miura suffered a stroke that paralyzed his right hand. Nevertheless, he continued to publish and published a collection of his essays under the title Ofukuro no Yomawari in June 2010.

In addition to his longer stories, he also wrote many short stories such as Jinenjo and Minomushi, both of which received the Yasunari Kawabata Prize in 1990 and 1995.

=== Death and legacy ===
Miura died on 29 August 2010, of heart failure in Tokyo.

Miura is an honorary citizen of his hometown Hachinohe, which erected a memorial stone at the town hall.

== Works ==
- 1960 – 忍ぶ川 (Shinobugawa), novel
- 1975/76 – 拳銃 (Kenjū), novel
- 1978 – 接吻 (Seppun)
- 1982 – 少年讃歌 (Shōnen sanka)
- 1984 – 白夜を旅する人々 (Hakuya o tabisuru hitobito)
- 2010 – おふくろの夜回り (Ofukuro no Yomawari), short-story collection

== See also ==
- List of children's literature writers
- List of Japanese writers
- List of novelists
- List of short story writers
