= Yoshiko Shigekane =

Japanese writer

- 重兼 芳子
- Born: March 7, 1927; Hokkaido, Japan
- Died: August 22, 1993 (aged 66)
- Occupation: Writer
- Writing career
- Language: Japanese
- Genre: Fiction
- Notable work: Yama ai no kemuri
- Notable awards: Akutagawa Prize

Yoshiko Shigekane (重兼 芳子, Shigekane Yoshiko; March 7, 1927 – August 22, 1993) was a Japanese writer from Hokkaido. She won the Akutagawa Prize in 1979, and her work has been adapted for film.

== Early life ==
Shigekane was born in Hokkaido, Japan on March 7, 1927. Her father worked for a mining company. Throughout her childhood she had problems with her hips dislocating, requiring multiple surgeries to address and providing experience that she would later incorporate into her story Miesugiru me (見えすぎる目, Eyes That See Too Well), about a child with similar problems who has a troubled relationship with her mother. The family later moved to Fukuoka. In 1946 Shigekane was baptized as a Protestant, and the next year she married her husband, with whom she subsequently had three children.

== Career ==
After raising her children Shigekane started taking writing courses. In 1978 she published her first story in a literary journal, with Sui-i appearing in Bungakukai, and received her first nomination for the Akutagawa Prize, for her story Baby Food. The next year Shigekane was nominated again for the Akutagawa Prize and won, becoming one of only six women to receive the prize in the 1970s. Her story Yama ai no keburi (やまあいの煙, The Smoke in the Mountain Valley), about a diligent crematorium worker, was chosen over Haruki Murakami's nominated story Hear the Wind Sing, which the committee considered to be too imitative of American literature to be awarded the Akutagawa Prize. Later that year Bungeishunjū published a collection of Shigekune's stories that included the title story Yama ai no keburi, Miesugiru me, and two other stories.

Shigekane wrote several more novels after winning the Akutagawa Prize, including the 1980 novel Usui kaigara (うすい貝殻, Thin Seashells), about a woman who conforms to the expectations of those around her, and the 1986 novel Kumazasa no hara no kaze no michi (熊笹の原に風の道, A Windy Pass in the Field of Low Striped Bamboos), about a bank worker whose new bride develops a fatal tumor. In 1985 Toho released a film adaptation of Yama ai no keburi titled Itoshiki hibi yo, starring Rino Katase and Masami Shimojō.

Shigekane died of cancer on August 22, 1993.

== Recognition ==
- 1979: 81st Akutagawa Prize (1979上)

== Film and other adaptations ==
- Itoshiki hibi yo (Fondness of Days Past), 1985

== Works ==
=== Selected works in Japanese ===
- Yama ai no keburi (やまあいの煙, The Smoke in the Mountain Valley), Bungeishunjū, 1979, OCLC 766261707
- Usui kaigara (うすい貝殻, Thin Seashells), Bungeishunjū, 1980, OCLC 673600529
- Kumazasa no hara no kaze no michi (熊笹の原に風の道, A Windy Pass in the Field of Low Striped Bamboos), Chuokoron-Shinsha, 1986, ISBN 9784120015441

=== Works in English ===
- "The Smoke in the Mountain Valley", trans. John Wilson and Motoko Naruse, Mississippi Review, 2012
