= Lee Hoesung =

Zainichi Korean novelist (1935–2025)

Lee Hoesung (李恢成)
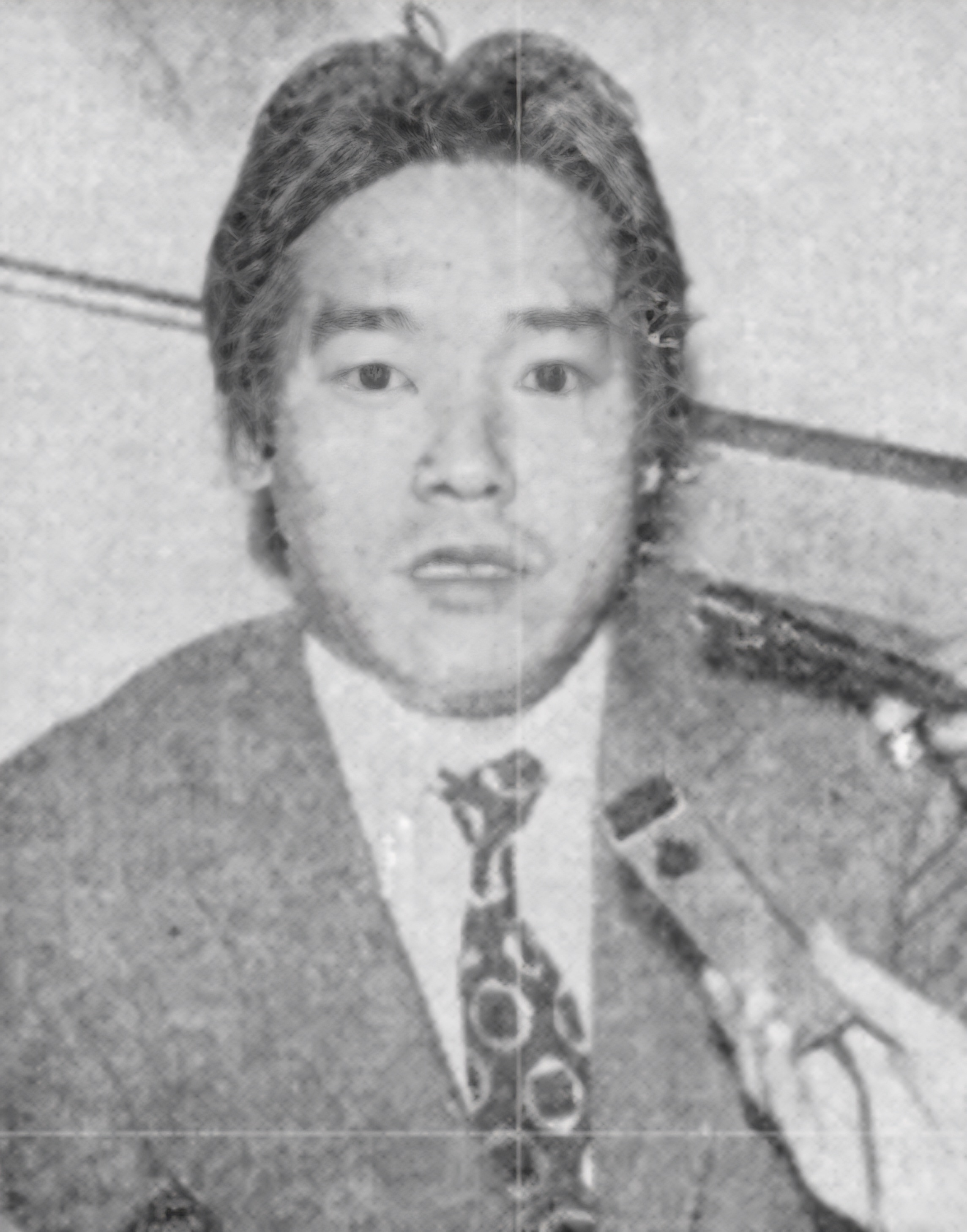
- Born: February 26, 1935; Maoka, Karafuto, Empire of Japan (present-day Kholmsk, Sakhalin, Russia)
- Died: January 5, 2025 (aged 89); Tokyo, Japan
- Occupation: Novelist
- Writing career
- Notable works: Hyakunen no tabibitotachi (百年の旅人たち; Travellers of a Hundred Years)

- Lee Hoesung
- Hangul: 이회성
- Hanja: 李恢成
- RR: I Hoeseong
- MR: I Hoesŏng

Lee Hoesung (Korean: 이회성; February 26, 1935 – January 5, 2025) was a Japanese Zainichi Korean novelist. He wrote under the pen name Ri Kaisei, the Japanese reading of his Korean name. In 1972, he became the first ethnic Korean to win the Akutagawa Prize for his story "The Woman Who Fulled Clothes" (Kinuta wo utsu onna). Other representative works of his include Mihatenu Yume (見果てぬ夢; Unfulfilled Dream) and Hyakunen no tabibitotachi (百年の旅人たち; Travellers of a Hundred Years).

== Life and career ==
Lee was born on February 26, 1935 to Korean immigrant parents in Maoka, Karafuto Prefecture (the southern half of modern-day Sakhalin), and lived there until age 10. After the surrender of Japan which ended World War II, Lee's family, having mixed in with Japanese settlers, escaped the Soviet troops and fled Karafuto. They went to a processing center in Nagasaki that repatriated migrants from former territories of the Empire of Japan, but finding themselves unable to return to Korea as they had planned, they settled down in Sapporo, Hokkaidō. Lee's older sister was left behind in Karafuto; in his later works, he describes the traumatic experience this was for him. From Sapporo's West High School, Lee went to Tokyo's Waseda University, where he studied literature. While there, he was active in exchange student activities. After graduation, he first aimed at doing creative work in Korean, but then decided to do it in Japanese instead. He was also employed at the Choson Sinbo, a Korean newspaper run by the pro-North Korea ethnic activist group Chongryon, but would later separate himself from them, and in 1969, having been awarded the Gunzo Prize for New Writers for Kinuta wo utsu onna, dedicated himself to literature. Kinuta wo utsu onna was notable at the time for its sporadic use of Korean words.

In 1970, he secretly visited South Korea, and went again after winning the Akutagawa Prize in 1972. At that time, he held Chōsen-seki rather than South Korean nationality. Afterwards, due to the problem of his nationality, he was refused a visa several times by the South Korean government, and it would not be before November 1995 that he was granted permission to visit again. However, in 1998, with the start of Kim Dae-jung's Sunshine Policy, he was able to obtain South Korean citizenship. He was later criticised by fellow zainichi writer Kim Sok-pom (金石範) for his comments about the democratization of South Korea and his naturalization as a South Korean, over which the two had a vigorous debate in magazines.

On the problem of North Korean abductions of Japanese, Lee stated: "The confession of Kim Jong-il, who apologised for his errors, should be accepted by Japanese people in the spirit of historical consciousness and the peace constitution."

Lee died on January 5, 2025, at the age of 89.

== Awards ==
- 1969: 12th Gunzo Prize for New Writers (群像新人文学賞) for Mata futatabi no michi (またふたたびの道)
- 1972: 66th Akutagawa Prize for Kinuta wo utsu onna (砧をうつ女)
- 1994: Noma Literary Prize for Hyakunen no tabibitotachi (百年の旅人たち)

== Major works ==
Title translations are not official English titles

- Kinuta wo utsu onna (砧をうつ女)
- Watashi no Saharin (私のサハリン; My Sakhalin)
- Kayako no tameni (伽倻子のために; For Kayako; made into a movie by 小栗康平 in 1984)
- Imujingawa wo mezasu toki (イムジン江をめざすとき; Eyes on the Imjin River)
- Ryūminten (流民伝; Refugee Tales)
- Kanōsei toshite no "Zainichi" (可能性としての「在日」; "Zainichi" as a possibility)
- Chijō seikatsusha (地上生活者; Living on land; serialized in Gunzo Magazine)
