= Minako Ōba =

Japanese writer (1930-2007)

Minako Ōba (大庭 みな子, Ōba Minako; born November 11, 1930, death May 24, 2007) was a Japanese author and social critic.

She was awarded the 1968 Akutagawa Prize for Sanbiki no kani (Three Crabs), and the 1982 Tanizaki Prize for Katachi mo naku (寂兮寥兮).

Ōba suffered a stroke in 1996 and died on May 24, 2007.

== Selected works ==
- Sanbiki no kani (Three Crabs), 1968.
- Funakuimushi (ふなくい虫), Tokyo : Kodansha, 1970.
- Yūreitachi no fukkatsusai, 1970
- Sabita kotoba, 1971.
- Shishu sabita kotoba (A Poetry Collection of Tarnished Words), 1971.
- Tsuga no yume, 1971.
- Uo no namida, 1971.
- Kokyū o hiku tori, 1972.
- Yasō no yume, 1973.
- Aoi kitsune, Tokyo : Kodansha, 1975.
- Garakuta hakubutsukan, 1975.
- Yamauba no Bisho (The Smile of the Mountain Witch), 1976.
- Urashimasō, 1977.
- Aoi chiisana hanashi, 1978.
- Samete miru yume, 1978.
- Hāna to mushi no kioku, 1979.
- Onna no danseiron, 1979.
- Taidan sei to shite no onna, 1979.
- Tankō, 1979.
- Katachi mo naku (寂兮寥兮), Tokyo : Kawade Shobō Shinsha, 1982.
- Shima no kuni no shima (島の国の島), Tokyo : Ushio Shuppansha, 1982.
- Kakeru otoko no yokogao (駈ける男の横顔), Tokyo : Chūō Kōronsha, 1984.
- Mae mae katatsumuri (舞へ舞へ蝸牛), Tokyo : Fukutake Shoten, 1984.
- Naku tori no (啼く鳥の), Tokyo : Kodansha, 1985.
- Onna otoko inochi (女・男・いのち), Tokyo : Yomiuri Shinbunsha, 1985.
- Onna (女), Tokyo : Sakuhinsha, 1987.
- Manʾyōshu (万葉集), Tokyo : Kōdansha, 1989.
- Kaoru ki no uta : haha to musume no ōfuku shokan (郁る樹の詩: 母と娘の往復書簡), Tokyo : Chūō Kōronsha, 1992.
- Nihyakunen (二百年), Tokyo : Kodansha, 1993.
- Yuki (雪), Tokyo : Fukutake Shoten, 1993.
- Warabeuta mutan (わらべ唄夢譚), Tokyo : Kawade Shobō Shinsha, 1995.

== English translations ==
- Tarnished Words: The Poetry of Oba Minako, translated by Janice Brown. EastBridge, Signature Books Series, 2005. ISBN 1-891936-38-7.
- Of Birds Crying, translated by Michiko N. Wilson and Michael K. Wilson. Cornell East Asia Series, 2011. ISBN 978-1-933947-30-3

== Bibliography ==
- Gender Is Fair Game: (Re)Thinking the (Fe)Male in the Works of Oba Minako, by Michiko Niikuni Wilson, M. E. Sharpe, 1998, ISBN 0-7656-0313-6.
