= Kenji Maruyama =

Japanese writer

Kenji Maruyama (丸山 健二, Maruyama Kenji; born December 23, 1943) is a Japanese author. He received the Akutagawa Prize for one of his novels, Summer’s Passage (夏の流れ, Natsu no nagare), in 1966, at the age of 23, becoming the third of an often touted group of college seniors to win the prize at age 23, following Ishihara Shintaro and Oe Kenzaburo.

== See also ==
- Japanese literature
