= Society for the Promotion of Japanese Literature =

The Society for the Promotion of Japanese Literature (日本文学振興会, Nihon Bungaku Shinkōkai) is an organisation, established in 1938, to promote Japanese literature.

It organises five literary prizes:

- Akutagawa Prize
- Kikuchi Kan Prize
- Matsumoto Prize
- Naoki Prize
- Ohya Prize
