= Reiko Mori (novelist) =

Japanese novelist and playwright

Reiko Mori (森禮子; July 7, 1928 – March 28, 2014) was a Japanese novelist and playwright. She was awarded the Akutagawa Award for her book Mokkingubado no iru machi (モッキングバードのいる町) in 1979.

== Early life and education ==
Mori was born Reiko Kawada on July 7, 1928 in Fukuoka, Japan. Her father died in 1933, and her one of her sisters died in 1945. Mori was a sickly child, and while ill in bed, would often read. However, the family did not have much money, so she could not afford to go to university. She but was able to audit classes while working at the Seinan University library, and began writing after meeting a group of poets while working at the library. She became a Baptist Christian in 1947.

== Career ==
In 1952, Naoki Kojima moved into the house next door to Mori's. He published her poems, stories, and essays in his literary magazine, the Kyushu Bungaku. She wrote under the penname "Reiko Mori". Mori moved to Tokyo in 1956, and was encouraged to continue publishing by Ashihei Hino. After meeting Rinzo Shiina in 1960, she began to write about similar themes to his works. Many of her early works were nominated or shortlisted for awards.

She visited Europe in 1972 and the United States in 1975. After the latter trip she wrote a book called Mokkingubado no iru machi (モッキングバードのいる町), which won the Akutagawa Award in 1979. She then visited South Korea and wrote a book called Sansai no onna (三彩の女) in 1983.

Mori died of pancreatic cancer on March 28, 2014.

== Style ==
Mori began her career by writing short stories and plays. After meeting Shiina, she began to write more plays that had themes of emancipation. She frequently wrote about hidden Christians during the Edo period. After Shiina died in 1973, she began to write children's plays and essays about her faith. She also began writing literary criticism. Toward the end of her career, Mori wrote about women's issues and published two biographies, one of Sumako Matsui and another of Yaeko Batchelor.

== Selected bibliography ==
- Chinkon kyoku (鎮魂曲), 1957
- Mokkingubado no iru machi (モッキングバードのいる町), 1979
- Goto kuzure (五島崩れ), 1980
- Jinsei no mawari michi (人生のまわり道), 1981
- Sansai no onna (三彩の女), 1983
- Kamin chu (神女), 1989
