= Chiya Fujino =

Japanese writer

Chiya Fujino (藤野 千夜, Fujino Chiya; born February 27, 1962) is a Japanese writer of literary fiction. She has published several novels and short stories, and has been awarded three major Japanese literary prizes.

Fujino is a transgender woman who reflects the difficulties of her own life journey in the characterisations of her writing. Many of her characters are social misfits in conflict with the conventions and mores of wider Japanese society.

Born in the city of Fukuoka, Fujino attended Chiba University. In the 1980s, she worked in a major Japanese publishing house before beginning her own writing career.

== Selected works ==
- Gogo no jikanwari (Afternoon timetable), 1995 (Winner, 14th Kaien New Novelists Prize)
- Shonen to shojo no poruka [Boy's and Girl's Polka] Benesse Corporation, 1996; Kodansha, 2000 (paperback)
- Oshaberi kaidan [Chatty] Kodansha, 1998; paperback 2001 (Winner, 20th Noma New Writers Prize)
- Natsu no yakusoku [Summer promise] Kodansha, 2000 (Winner, 122nd Akutagawa Prize)
- Ruuto 225 [Route 225] Rironsha, 2002; Shinchosha, 2004 (paperback)
- "The Housewife and the Police Box" (English translation of "Shufu to koban"), included in Tokyo Fragments: Short Stories of Tokyo by Five of Japan's leading Contemporary Writers (translated by Giles Murray), IBC Publishing, 2004
- Bejitaburu haitsu [Vegetable apartment] Kobunsha, 2005
- "Her Room" (English translation of "Kanojo no heya"), included in Inside and Other Short Fiction - Japanese Women by Japanese Women Kodansha, 2006

=== Print ===
- "Preface" in Tokyo Fragments: Short Stories of Tokyo by Five of Japan's leading Contemporary Writers (translated by Giles Murray), IBC Publishing, 2004
