= Yoriko Shono =

Japanese writer (born 1956)

- Born: 16 March 1956 (age 70); Yokkaichi, Mie, Japan
- Occupation: Writer

Yoriko Shono (笙野 頼子, Shōno Yoriko), born 16 March 1956, is a Japanese writer who describes her writing as 'avant-pop'.

== Biography ==
Yoriko Shono (real name Yoriko Ishikawa) was born in Yokkaichi, Mie Prefecture, grew up in Ise and studied in the Law Department at Ritsumeikan University in Kyoto. She started writing while she was at university, and made her debut with the story "Gokuraku" in 1981, but was not published again until her 1991 collection Nani mo Shitenai, which won the Noma Literary Prize for New Writers. She really began to draw attention in 1994 when her story "Ni Hyaku Kaiki" won the Yukio Mishima Prize, and another story, "Time Slip Kombinat" won the Akutagawa Prize in the same year. For winning these three prizes she became known as the 'new writer's prize triple crown winner.'

== Selected works ==
- Nani mo Shitenai (1991)
- Ni Hyaku Kaiki (1994)
- Time Slip Kombinat (1994)
  - excerpt in English “Time Warp Complex”
- Gokuraku (1994)
- Haha no Hattatsu (1996)
- Yūkai Morimusume Ibun (2001)
- Suishōnai Seido (2003)
