= Toshiyuki Horie =

Japanese writer

Toshiyuki Horie (堀江 敏幸, Horie Toshiyuki, born January 3, 1964) is a Japanese author, translator, and scholar of French literature.

== Biography ==
Horie was born in Gifu Prefecture, and studied at Waseda University, where he is now a professor of creative writing. He studied for three years at the University of Paris III on a French government scholarship. Horie, who is also a member of many literary prize selection committees, is a critic and translator of authors including Michel Foucault, Hervé Guibert, Michel Rio, and Jacques Réda. His books have been translated into French, Korean, and English.

== Books (selection) ==
- Kōgai e (郊外へ, "To the Suburbs"), 1995
- Shigosen wo motomete (子午線を求めて, "In Search of the Meridian"), 2000
- Kakareru te (書かれる手, "The Hand Which is Written"), 2000
- Kuma no shikiishi (熊の敷石, "The Bear and the Paving Stone"), 2000

== Prizes ==
- 1999 Mishima Yukio Prize for Oparavan (おぱらばん)
- 2001 Akutagawa Prize for Kuma no shikiishi (The Bear And The Paving Stone, 熊の敷石)
- 2004 Tanizaki Prize for Yukinuma to sono shūhen (Yukinuma and Its Environs, 雪沼とその周辺)
- 2005 Yomiuri Prize for Kagan bōjitsushō
- 2010 Yomiuri Prize, Section for Essay & Travelogue, for Seigen Kyokusen (正弦曲線, "Sine Curve")
- 2012 Sei Itō Literary Prize for Nazuna (なずな)
- 2013 Mainichi Book Review Prize for Furiko de kotoba wo saguru yō ni (振り子で言葉を探るように, "Like Fumbling for Words with a Pendulum")
