= Chisako Wakatake =

Japanese writer (born 1954)

- 若竹 千佐子
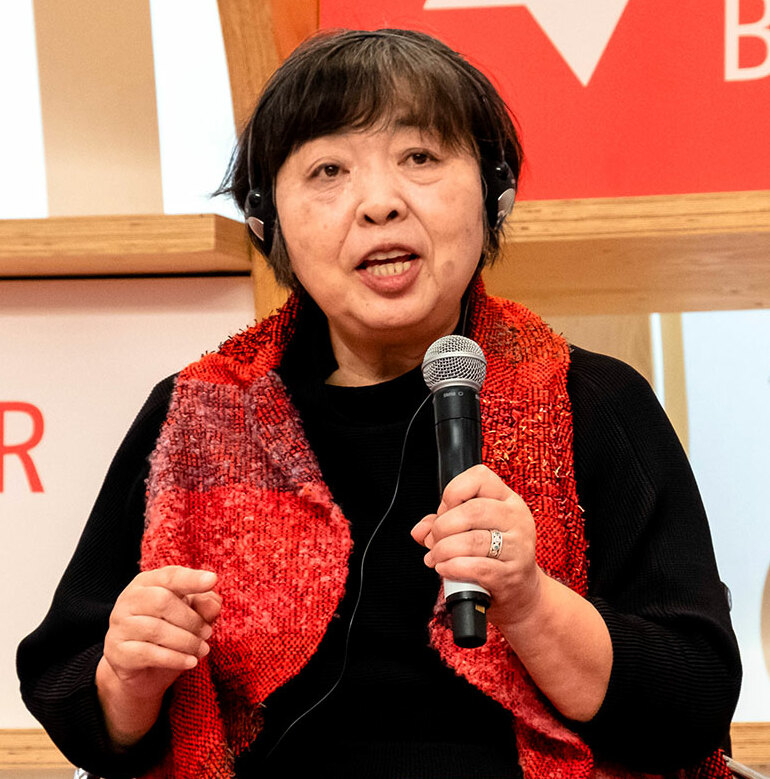
- Wakatake in 2022
- Born: 1954 (age 71–72); Tōno, Iwate, Japan
- Education: Iwate University
- Occupation: Writer
- Writing career
- Language: Japanese
- Genre: Fiction
- Notable work: Ora ora de hitori igu mo
- Notable awards: Akutagawa Prize; Bungei Prize

Chisako Wakatake (若竹 千佐子, Wakatake Chisako; born 1954) is a Japanese writer. Her 2017 book Ora ora de hitori igu mo won the Akutagawa Prize and the Bungei Prize.

== Biography ==
Wakatake was born in 1954 in Tōno, Iwate, Japan. She started writing while in school, but after graduating from Iwate University she worked briefly as a teacher, then married and became a housewife. While working at home Wakatake wrote occasionally and won a small local literary prize for a story she submitted, but she never seriously pursued a writing career. At the age of 55, after the death of her husband, she started writing full-time, drawing on her own experiences of age and loneliness.

Wakatake's first book, Ora ora de hitori igu mo (I'll Live By Myself), about a Tōhoku dialect-speaking widow coping with life alone after the death of her husband, was published in 2017. Ora ora de hitori igu mo won the 54th Bungei Prize, making Wakatake the oldest recipient of the award, at age 63. Shortly thereafter it also won the 158th Akutagawa Prize, making Wakatake the second oldest recipient of the award. After winning the Akutagawa Prize, Wakatake visited her hometown of Tōno, Iwate, where she received a local citizens' honor recognizing her for raising awareness of the town throughout Japan.

Critic Roland Kelts, writing for The Times Literary Supplement, has described the themes of Wakatake's work as "loneliness and repressed turmoil."

== Personal life ==
Wakatake lives in Kisarazu, Chiba Prefecture.

== Recognition ==
- 2017 54th Bungei Prize
- 2018 158th Akutagawa Prize (2017下)

== Bibliography ==
- Ora ora de hitori igumo, Kawade Shobō Shinsha, 2017, ISBN 9784309026374
