= Shinsuke Numata =

Japanese writer

- 沼田真佑
- Born: 1978 (age 47–48); Otaru, Hokkaido, Japan
- Writing career
- Language: Japanese
- Genre: Fiction
- Notable work: Eiri
- Notable awards: Akutagawa Prize

Shinsuke Numata (Japanese: 沼田真佑) is a Japanese writer. He is a winner of the Akutagawa Prize for literature.

== Biography ==
Numata was born in Otaru, in Hokkaido, Japan, in 1978.

== Works ==
Eiri (2017) - A book dealing with the relationship between two men and the aftermath of the 3/11 Tohoku earthquake and tsunami. Eiri was adapted into the film Beneath the Shadow in 2020 by Japanese director Keishi Otomo.

=== Translations ===
Eiri was translated into French as La Pêche au toc dans le Tôhoku (Fishing in Tohoku) by Patrick Honnoré and published in 2020 .

== Awards ==
Numata was awarded 157th Akutagawa Prize in 2017, for his first published work, Eiri (影裏).
