= Yoshikichi Furui =

Japanese writer (1937–2020)

- 古井 由吉
- Born: 19 November 1937; Tokyo, Japan
- Died: 18 February 2020 (aged 82); Tokyo, Japan
- Occupations: Author; translator

Yoshikichi Furui (古井 由吉, Furui Yoshikichi; 19 November 1937 – 18 February 2020) was a Japanese author and translator. He has won the Akutagawa Prize, the Tanizaki Prize, and the Yomiuri Prize, among other literary awards.

== Biography ==
Furui was born in Tokyo, Japan. He was educated at the University of Tokyo, where he majored in German literature, receiving a BA in 1960. His undergraduate thesis was on Franz Kafka. He remained at Tokyo University for graduate work for another two years, earning an MA in German literature in 1962. After graduating, he accepted a position at Kanazawa University where he taught German language and literature for three years. He subsequently moved to Rikkyo University in Tokyo where he remained as an assistant professor of German literature until the watershed year of 1970.

The early 1970s was a period of rapid economic growth and cultural efflorescence. In the literary sphere, a new group of authors was emerging. These authors differed notably from their predecessors because of their move away from the overt social and political commentary—particularity as directed against the system that supported Japan's involvement in World War II—then common both in recent works of literature, and as a measure by which literature was measured. Because this new group of authors turned their gaze from society to the individual, looking inward, engaging the fears and fantasies of an urban population beset by a crisis of identity in a time of rapid economic growth, they were called the introverted generation (内向の世代, Naikō no Sedai), and Furui was, perhaps, their exemplar.

In 1970 Furui resigned from Rikkyo University to become a full-time writer. In 1971 his novella Yōko was awarded the Akutagawa Prize, and he has subsequently won both the Tanizaki Prize and Kawabata Prize.

Furui has also translated Robert Musil and Hermann Broch.

On 18 February 2020, Furui died of hepatocellular carcinoma in his home in Tokyo. He was 82.

== Major prizes ==
- 1970 Akutagawa Prize – Yoko (杳子, Yōko)
- 1983 19th Tanizaki Prize – Asagao (槿; Morning Glory)
- 1987 14th Kawabata Prize – On Nakayama Hill (中山坂, Nakayama-saka)
- 1990 41st Yomiuri Prize – Accounts of Rebirth: A Provisional Draft (仮往生伝試文, Kariōjō Den Shibun)
- 1997 Mainichi Art Award – White-Haired Melody (白髪の唄, Hakuhatsu no Uta)

== Selected works in translation ==
- White-Haired Melody, trans. Meredith McKinney; University of Michigan Center for Japanese Studies, Michigan Monograph Series in Japanese Studies, No. 61, 2008; ISBN 978-1-929280-46-9.
- Child of Darkness: Yoko and Other Stories, trans. Donna George Storey; University of Michigan Center for Japanese Studies, Michigan Monograph Series in Japanese Studies, No. 18, 1997; ISBN 0-939512-79-3.
- Ravine and Other Stories, trans. Meredith McKinney; Stone Bridge Press, Rock Spring Collection of Japanese Literature, 1997; ISBN 1-880656-29-9.
- "Wedlock", trans. Howard Hibbett, in Contemporary Japanese Literature; Knopf, 1977; pp. 3–40; ISBN 0-394-49141-6.
