= Kaori Fujino =

Japanese writer

- 藤野 可織
- Born: 1980 (age 45–46); Kyoto, Japan
- Education: Doshisha University
- Occupation: Writer
- Writing career
- Notable works: Tsume to me; Iyashii tori
- Notable awards: Akutagawa Prize; Bungakukai Prize

Kaori Fujino (藤野 可織, Fujino Kaori) is a Japanese writer from Kyoto. Her work has won the 103rd Bungakukai Prize and the 149th Akutagawa Prize.

== Early life and education ==
Fujino was born in Kyoto in 1980 and lived there through her school years, eventually completing a master's degree at Kyoto's Doshisha University with a thesis on the photographer Ihei Kimura. Though she had originally planned to become a museum curator, after graduating Fujino worked a part-time job at a publishing company to support her writing.

== Career ==
In 2006 Fujino made her literary debut with the story Iyashii tori, which won the 103rd Bungakukai Prize and was later published in a book of the same title. Her short novel Tsume to me (Nails and Eyes), about a young girl observing the behavior of her father's lover, was published in 2013. Tsume to me won the 149th Akutagawa Prize. Since winning the Akutagawa Prize Fujino has primarily published short stories, many of which have been collected in the 2014 book Fainaru Gāru (Final Girl) and the 2017 book Doresu (Dress).

In 2017 the Japan Foundation sponsored Fujino's residency in the International Writing Program at the University of Iowa.

== Recognition ==
- 2006 103rd Bungakukai Prize
- 2013 149th Akutagawa Prize (2013上)

== Works ==
=== Books in Japanese ===
- Iyashii tori, Bungei Shunjū, 2008, ISBN 9784163274409
- Patorone, Shueisha, 2012, ISBN 9784087714449
- Ohanashishitekochan, Kodansha, 2013, ISBN 9784062186308
- Tsume to me (Nails and Eyes), Shinchosha, 2013, ISBN 9784103345114
- Fainaru gāru (Final Girl), Fusōsha, 2014, ISBN 9784594070281
- Doresu (Dress), Kawade Shobō Shinsha, 2017, ISBN 9784309026244

=== Selected work in English ===
- "You Okay For Time?", trans. Ginny Tapley Takemori, Granta, 2017
- "Nails and Eyes", trans. Kendall Heitzman, Pushkin Press, 2023, ISBN 978-1-78227-954-9
