= Kiyohiro Miura =

Japanese writer

Kiyohiro Miura (三浦清宏, Miura Kiyohiro, born 1930 in Muroran, Hokkaido) is a Japanese writer. After attending the University of Tokyo he went to the United States for further education. He received his B.A. from San Jose State University in 1955 and his MFA from University of Iowa in 1958. His novel Chōnan no shukke (長男の出家) or My Young Son Becomes a Zen Monk won the Akutagawa Prize in 1988.
