= Yuichi Takai =

Japanese writer

- 高井 有一
- Born: April 27, 1932
- Died: October 26, 2016 (aged 84)
- Occupation: Author
- Writing career
- Notable awards: Akutagawa Prize (1965); Tanizaki Prize (1984); Yomiuri Prize (1989)

Yuichi Takai (高井 有一, Takai Yūichi; April 27, 1932 – October 26, 2016) was a Japanese author.

Takai won the 1965 Akutagawa Prize for Kita no kawa (Northern Stream), the 1984 Tanizaki Prize for Kono kuni no sora (この国の空, This Country's Sky), and the 1989 Yomiuri Prize for Yoru no ari (夜 の 蟻).

== Selected works ==
- Shōnentachi no senjo, 1968.
- Yoake no tochi, 1968.
- Tanima no michi, 1969.
- Yuki no hate no fūsō, 1970.
- Tōi hi no umi, 1972.
- Mushitachi no sumika (蟲たち の 棲家), Tōkyō : Bungei Shunjū, 1973.
- Kuregata no mori ni te, 1976.
- Yume no ishibumi, 1976.
- Kansatsusha no chikara, 1977.
- Shinjitsu no gakko, 1980.
- Kono kuni no sora (この 国 の 空), Tōkyō : Shinchōsha, 1983.
- Bara no nedoko (薔薇 の 寝床), Tōkyō : Chūō Kōronsha, 1985.
- Chiri no miyako ni (塵 の 都 に), Tōkyō : Kōdansha, 1988.
- Yoru no ari (夜 の 蟻), Tōkyō : Chikuma Shobō, 1989.
- Shohan (初版) Tōkyō : Shōgakkan, 1991.
- Tachihara Seishū (立原 正秋), Tōkyō : Shinchōsha, 1991.
- Sakka no ikishini (作家 の 生き死), Tōkyō : Kadokawa Shoten, 1997.
