= Gunzo (magazine) =

Japanese literary magazine

Gunzō
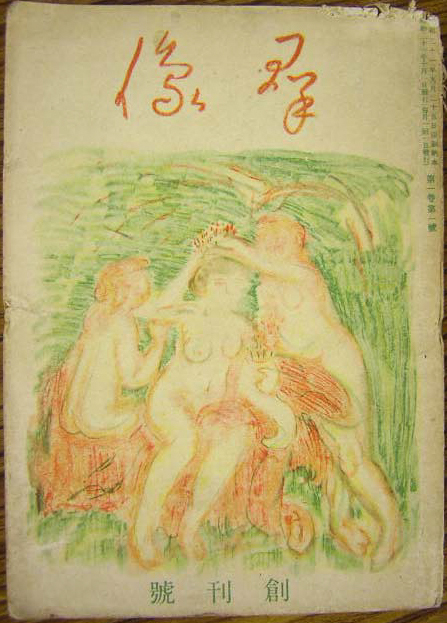
- The cover of the first issue of Gunzō in October, 1946.
- Categories: junbungaku
- Frequency: Monthly
- First issue: October 1946
- Company: Kodansha
- Country: Japan
- Language: Japanese
- Website: gunzo.kodansha.co.jp

Gunzō (群像, group sculpture) is a Japanese monthly literary magazine published in Japan.

== History and profile ==
Gunzō was first published in October 1946 as junbungaku (純文学; lit. "pure literature") oriented publication. The magazine is published by Kodansha.

The past contributors for the magazine include: Kenzaburō Ōe, Haruki Murakami and Yoriko Shono. Along with Shinchō, Bungakukai, Subaru and Bungei magazines, Gunzō is among the leading thick literary magazines in Japan.

Gunzō is also aimed at discovering new talent, both among writers and critics. It runs the annual Gunzo Prize for New Writers, and provides informational support for the Noma Prize. It had a policy of running stories anonymously to encourage people not to read stories for the name of the author.
