= Steve Rabson =

American Japanologist

Steve Rabson (born May 7, 1943) is an American Japanologist, historian, translator, academic and professor emeritus of East Asian Studies at Brown University.

== Career ==
Rabson's research has focused on modern Japanese literature, especially works depicting war, its aftermath, and the experiences of women and minorities. He is regarded as an expert on Okinawa, subject of several of his books, and has spoken of wartime rape there to the New York Times. He is also a Japan Focus associate. As a U.S. Army draftee he was stationed in Okinawa in 1967-68.

== Selected works ==
In an overview of writings by and about Rabson, OCLC/WorldCat lists roughly 11 works in 17 publications in 2 languages and 360+ library holdings.

- The poetry of Kaneko Mitsuharu, 1979
- Okinawa : Two Postwar Novellas (Institute of East Asian Studies, University of California, Berkeley, 1989, reprinted 1996)
- Shimazaki Tōson on war, 1991
- Yosano Akiko on War : To Give One's Life or Not : A Question of Which War, April 1991
- Righteous Cause or Tragic Folly: Changing Views of War in Modern Japanese Poetry, (Center for Japanese Studies, University of Michigan, 1998)
- Southern exposure: modern Japanese literature from Okinawa, co-edited with Michael Molasky (University of Hawaii Press, 2000)
- Edo senryū on waka and women, 2003
- The Okinawan Diaspora in Japan: Crossing the Borders Within (University of Hawaii Press, 2012)
- Kpop Crash Course: Beyond Gangnam Style, Dr Steve Rabson with Alexandra Swords
- Islands of Protest: Japanese Literature from Okinawa, co-edited with Davinder Bhowmik (University of Hawaii Press, 2016)
- Training and Deployment of America's Nuclear Cold Warriors in Asia (Cambridge Scholars Publishing, 2022)
