= Shinchō =

Japanese literary magazine

Shincho (新潮, Shinchō; New Tide) is a Japanese literary magazine published monthly by Shinchosha. Since its launch in 1904 it has published the works of many of Japan's leading writers. Along with Bungakukai, Gunzo, Bungei and Subaru, it is one of the five leading literary journals in Japan.

The magazine features English translations of Japanese literary works. It presents the Shincho Literary Award.

== See also ==
- List of literary magazines
