= Japan–U.S. Friendship Commission Prize for the Translation of Japanese Literature =

American award presented by Columbia University

- Type: Literary Translation
- Awarded for: The best translation of a Japanese literary work (modern or classical) into English.
- Country: United States
- Presented by: Donald Keene Center of Japanese Culture at Columbia University
- Reward: $6,000 (USD) annually (can be divided between two translations)
- First award: 1979; 47 years ago

The Japan–U.S. Friendship Commission Prize for the Translation of Japanese Literature was established in 1979 and is administered by the Donald Keene Center of Japanese Culture at Columbia University. It is the oldest prize for Japanese literary translation in the United States.

Works entered into competition are judged on the literary merit of the translation and the accuracy with which it reflects the spirit of the Japanese original.

The Keene Center annually awards $6,000 (USD) in Japan–U.S. Friendship Commission Prizes for the Translation of Japanese Literature. A prize is given for the best translation of a modern work or a classical work, or the prize is divided between equally distinguished translations.

== List of winners ==
The following is a list of the winners:

Year	Winner(s) ^{1}	Publisher ^{2}	Notes
1979	Mr. Ian Hideo Levy for Man'yōshū (万葉集) and Prof. Robert Epp for Poetry by Kinoshita by Yuji Kinoshita	Princeton University Press, Yuji Katydid Books	The first prize ever given was a shared prize.
1980	Prof. Juliet Winters Carpenter for Secret Rendezvous (密会, Mikkai) by Kōbō Abe	Alfred A. Knopf	
1981	Prof. Kären Wigen for A View by the Sea (海辺の光景, Kaihen no kōkei) by Shōtarō Yasuoka, a collection of short fiction including the titular novella	Columbia University Press	
1982	Prof. Laurel Rasplica Rodd for Kokinshū: A Collection of Poems Ancient and Modern (古今集, Kokinshū)	Princeton University Press	
1983	Prof. Phyllis Lyons for The Selected Works of Dazai Osamu by Osamu Dazai	Stanford University Press	
1984	-	-	No prize was awarded
1985	Mr. Lane Dunlop for A Late Chrysanthemum: Twenty-four Stories from the Japanese (a short story collection including works by Naoya Shiga, Yasunari Kawabata, Osamu Dazai, Kōbō Abe, Fumiko Hayashi, among others)	North Point Press	
1986	-	-	No prize was awarded
1987	Prof. William E. Naff for Before the Dawn (夜明け前, Yoakemae) by Tōson Shimazaki	University of Hawaiʻi Press	
1988	Prof. Carol Apollonio Flath for The Phoenix Tree and Other Stories (青桐, Aogiri) by Satoko Kizaki	Kodansha International	
1989	Modern: Ms. Phyllis Birnbaum for Confessions of Love (色ざんげ, Iro zange) by Chiyo Uno; Classical: Prof. Steven Carter for Waiting for the Wind: 36 Poets of Japan's Late Medieval Period	University of Hawaiʻi Press, Columbia University Press	
1990	Modern: Prof. Stephen Snyder for The Signore (安土 往還記, Azuchi ōkanki) by Kunio Tsuji; Classical: Prof. Paul Gordon Schalow for The Great Mirror of Male Love (男色大鏡, Nanshoku Ōkagami) by Ihara Saikaku	Kodansha International, Stanford University Press	
1991	Modern: Prof. Paul McCarthy for A Cat, A Man, and Two Women (猫と庄造と二人の女, Neko to Shōzō to futari no onna) by Jun'ichirō Tanizaki; Classical: Prof. Margaret Childs for Rethinking Sorrow: Revelatory Tales of Late Medieval Japan	Kodansha International, University of Michigan Center for Japanese Studies	
1992	Modern: Ms. Eve Zimmerman for Strawberry Road by Ishikawa Yoshimi; Classical: Prof. Edwin Cranston for A Waka Anthology: The Gem-Glistening Cup. Vol I	Kodansha International, Stanford University Press	
1993	-	-	No prize was awarded
1994	Modern: Mr. Wayne P. Lammers for Still Life and Other Stories (静物, Seibutsu) by Junzo Shono; Classical: Prof. H. Mack Horton for The Journal of Socho by Saiokuken Socho	Stone Bridge Press, Stanford University Press	
1995	-	-	No prize was awarded
1996	Modern: Prof. John Solt Glass Beret for The Selected Poems of Kitasono Katsue (1902-78) by Katué Kitasono; Classical: Prof. Makoto Ueda for Modern Japanese Tanka	Morgan Press, Columbia University Press	
1997	-	-	No prize was awarded
1998	Modern: Prof. Elaine Gerbert for Love of Mountains (Yamagoi) by Kōji Uno; Classical: Prof. J. Thomas Rimer and Prof. Jonathan Chaves for Japanese and Chinese Poems to Sing: The Wakan Roei-shu	University of Hawaiʻi Press, Columbia University Press	
1999	Modern: Prof. Jay Rubin for The Wind-Up Bird Chronicle (ねじまき鳥クロニクル, Nejimakidori Kuronikuruu) by Haruki Murakami; Classical: Mr. Hiroaki Sato for Breeze Through Bamboo by Ema Saikō	Alfred A. Knopf, Columbia University Press	
2000	Modern: Ms. Meredith McKinney for Ravine and Other Stories by Yoshikichi Furui; Classical: Prof. Roger K. Thomas for A Tale of False Fortunes (Namamiko Monogatari) by Fumiko Enchi	Stone Bridge Press, University of Hawai’i Press	
2001	Modern: Prof. James Philip Gabriel for Life in the Cul-De-Sac (群棲, Gunsei) by Kuroi Senji; Classical: Prof. Mae J. Smethurst for Dramatic Representations of Filial Piety: Five Noh in Translation	Stone Bridge Press, Cornell University Press	
2002	Prof. Royall Tyler for The Tale of Genji (源氏物語, Genji monogatari) by Murasaki Shikibu	Viking Press	
2003	Modern: Shogo Oketani and Leza Lowitz for America and Other Poems by Ayukawa Nobuo; Classical: Charles S. Inouye for Japanese Gothic Tales (Volume Two) by Kyōka Izumi	Kaya Press, University of Hawai’i Press	
2004	Prof. Lawrence Rogers for Tokyo Stories: A Literary Stroll, a collection of short fiction set in different areas of Tokyo, including pieces by Kyūsaku Yumeno, Yukio Mishima, Ryūnosuke Akutagawa, Yasunari Kawabata, Natsume Sōseki and others	University of California Press	
2005	Modern: Prof. Yosei Sugawara The Gift of Numbers by Yōko Ogawa; Classical: Prof. Damian Flanagan for The Tower of London by Natsume Sōseki	Picador, Peter Owen Publishers	
2006	Modern: Prof. Edward Fowler A Man with No Talents: Memoirs of a Tokyo Day Laborer by Ōyama Shirō; Classical: Prof. Joel Cohn for Botchan: A Modern Classic by Natsume Sōseki	Cornell University Press, Kodansha USA	
2007	Modern: Prof. Kozue Uzawa and Ms. Amelia Fielden for Ferris Wheel: 101 Modern and Contemporary Tanka; Classical: Prof. Anthony H. Chambers for Tales of Moonlight and Rain (雨月物語, Ugetsu Monogatari) by Ueda Akinari	Cheng & Tsui, Columbia University Press	
2008	Prof. Dennis C. Washburn for The Temple of the Wild Geese (雁の寺, Gan no tera) and Bamboo Dolls of Echizen (越前竹人形, Echizen takeningyō) by Tsutomu Mizukami.	Dalkey Archive Press	
2009	Modern: Prof. Jeffrey M. Angles for Forest of Eyes: Selected Poems of Tada Chimako by Tada Chimako; Classical: Prof. Esperanza Ramirez-Christensen Murmured Conversations. A Treatise on Poetry and Buddhism by the Poet-Monk Shinkei by Shinkei	University of California Press, Stanford University Press	
2010	Modern: Prof. Michael Emmerich for Manazuru (真鶴) by Hiromi Kawakami; Classical: Prof. Tom Hare for Zeami: Performance Notes by Zeami Motokiyo	Counterpoint, Cambridge University Press	
2011	Matthew Fraleigh for New Chronicles of Yanagibashi and Diary of a Journey to the West: Narushima Ryūhoku Reports from Home and Abroad by Narushima Ryūhoku; J. Keith Vincent for A Riot of Goldfish (金魚撩乱, Kingyo ryōran) by Kanoko Okamoto, including The Food Demon (Shokuma).	Cornell University Press, Hesperus Press	
2012	-	-	No prize was awarded
2013	W.S. Merwin and Takako Lento for Collected Haiku of Yosa Buson by Yosa Buson	Copper Canyon Press	
2014	Juliet Winters Carpenter for A True Novel (本格小説, Honkaku Shōsetsu) by Minae Mizumura; Rebecca Copeland for The Goddess Chronicle (女神記, Joshinki) by Natsuo Kirino	Other Press, Canongate Books	
2015	Steven D. Carter for The Columbia Anthology of Japanese Essay; Terry Gallagher for Self-Reference ENGINE by Toh EnJoe; Stephen D. Miller and Patrick Donnelly for The Wind from Vulture Peak	Columbia University Press, VIZ Media, Cornell University Press	
2016	-	-	No prize was awarded
2017	David Boyd for Slow Boat by Hideo Furukawa; Hiroaki Sato for The Silver Spoon: Memoir of a Boyhood in Japan by Kansuke Naka	Pushkin Press, Stone Bridge Press	
2018	Takako Lento for Pioneers of Modern Japanese Poetry by Mitsuharu Kaneko	Cornell University Press	
2019	Janine Beichman for Beneath the Sleepless Tossing of the Planets, Selected Poems 1972-1989 by Makoto Ōoka; Sam Bett for Star by Yukio Mishima	Kurodahan Press, New Directions Publishing	
2020	Gerald Groemer for Portraits of Edo and Early Modern Japan: The Shogun's Capital in Zuihitsu Writings, 1657-1855	Palgrave Macmillan	
2021	David Boyd for The Hole (穴, Ana) by Hiroko Oyamada; Glynne Walley for Eight Dogs, or Hakkenden: Part One—An Ill-Considered Jest by Kyokutei Bakin	New Directions Publishing, Cornell University Press	
2022	Brian Bergstrom for Trinity, Trinity, Trinity by Erika Kobayashi	Astra House	
2023	Torquil Duthie for The Kokinshū: Selected Poems; Kendall Heitzman for Nails and Eyes by Kaori Fujino	Columbia University Press, Pushkin Press	
2024	David Boyd for Takaoka’s Travels by Tatsuhiko Shibusawa	Stone Bridge Press, MONKEY imprint	
2025	Joshua S. Mostow for Hyakunin’shu: Reading the Hundred Poets in Late Edo Japan	University of Hawaiʻi Press	

^{1} Note: From 1979 to 1988, only a single translation prize was given annually. Beginning in 1989, the prize was given in two categories: translations from Japanese classical literature and translation from Japanese modern literature (although such distinctions vary as does the number of winners in a given year). In some years only the classical translation is awarded.
^{2} Note: Where it applies, first the publisher of the first work mentioned then the publisher of the second work mentioned, separated by a comma.

== See also ==
- Japan–United States Friendship Act of 1975
