= John Whittier Treat =

American academic (born 1953)

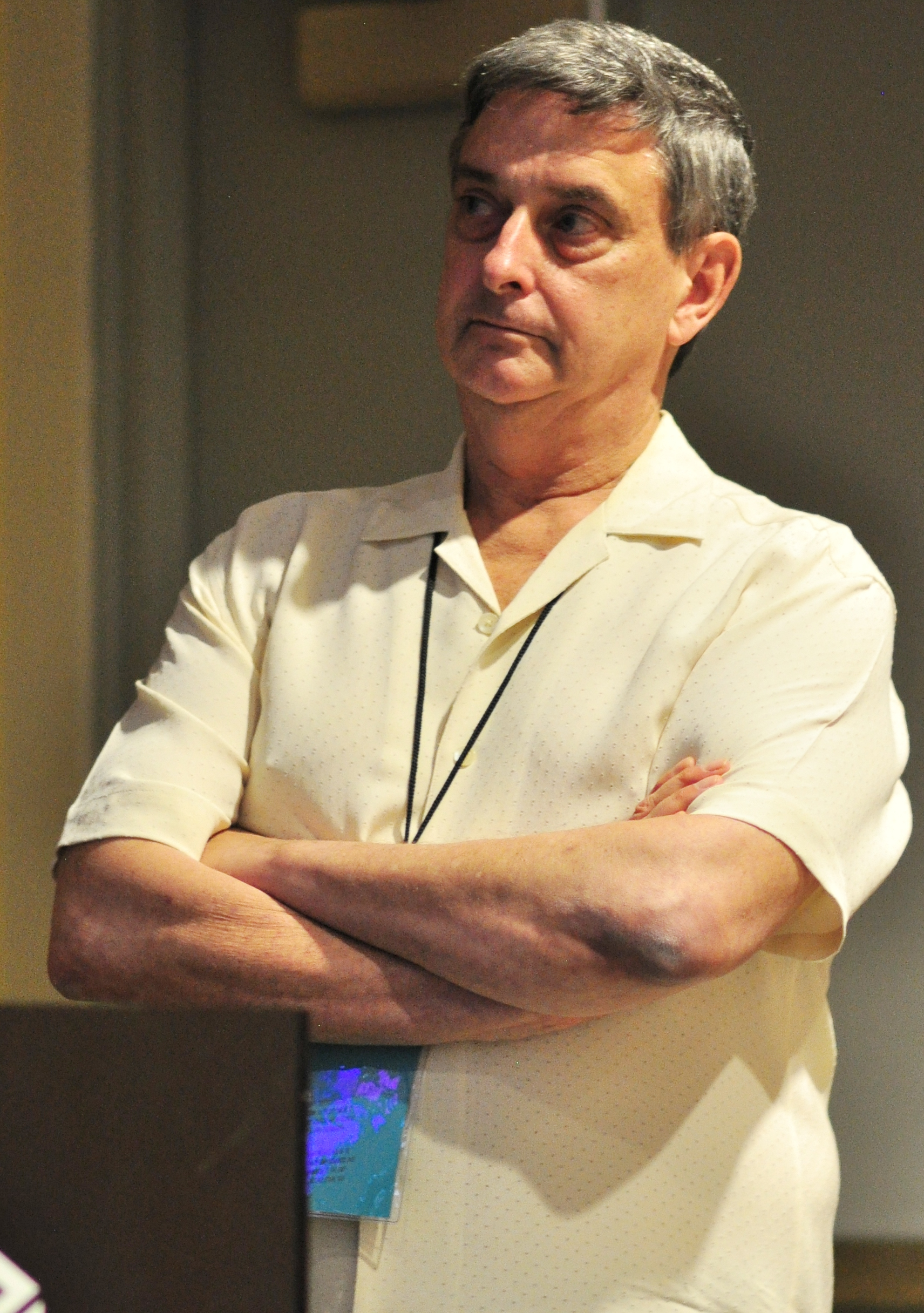
Treat presenting at the 2015 EMP Pop Conference

John Whittier Treat (born August 10, 1953 in New Haven) is Professor Emeritus of East Asian Languages and Literature at Yale University, Connecticut, United States, where he teaches Japanese literature and culture. He was co-editor of the Journal of Japanese Studies. He has published numerous essays and several books on Japan-related topics. In 2008 he discussed his work with Peter Shea at the University of Minnesota.

He received his BA in Asian Studies 1975 from Amherst College, Massachusetts, and his MA and PhD in East Asian Languages and Literatures from Yale University in 1979 and 1982, respectively. In 2011 he translated Yi Gwangsu's short story, "Maybe Love" (사랑인가, 1909), which was then published in the journal Azalea by the University of Hawaiʻi Press.

== Selected works ==
=== Nonfiction ===
- Pools of Water, Pillars of Fire: The Literature of Ibuse Masuji (1988) ISBN 978-0-295-96625-0
- Contemporary Japan and Popular Culture (1995) ISBN 978-0-8248-1854-8
- Writing Ground Zero: Japanese Literature and the Atomic Bomb (1995) ISBN 978-0-226-81178-9
- Great Mirrors Shattered: Homosexuality, Orientalism, and Japan (1999) ISBN 978-0-19-510923-8
- The Rise and Fall of Modern Japanese Literature (2018) ISBN 978-0-226-81170-3

=== Fiction ===
- The Rise and Fall of the Yellow House (2015) ISBN 978-0-9965405-7-5
- Maid Service (2020) ISBN 978-1-64656-403-3
- First Consonants (2022) ISBN 978-1-938841-86-6

=== Peer-reviewed articles ===
- “Early Hiroshima Poetry.” Journal of the Association of Teachers of Japanese, vol. 20, no. 2 (November 1986), pp. 209–31.
- “Atomic Bomb Literature and the Documentary Fallacy.” Journal of Japanese Studies, vol. 14, no. 1 (Winter 1988), pp. 27–57.
- “Hiroshima and the Place of the Narrator.” The Journal of Asian Studies, vol. 48, no. 1 (February 1989), pp. 29–49.
- “Yoshimoto Banana Writes Home: Shōjo Culture and the Nostalgic Subject.” Journal of Japanese Studies, vol. 19, no. 2 (Summer 1993), pp. 353–387.
- “Symposium on Contemporary Japanese Popular Culture: Introduction.” Journal of Japanese Studies, vol. 19, no. 2 (Summer 1993), pp. 289–93.
- “The Beheaded Emperor and the Absent Figure in Contemporary Japanese Literature.” PMLA, vol. 109, no. 1 (January 1994), pp. 100–15.
- “Hiroshima, Ground Zero.” PMLA, vol. 124, no. 5 (October 2009), pp. 1883–85.
- “Introduction to Yi Kwang-su’s ‘Maybe Love’ (Ai ka, 1909).” Azalea: Journal of Korean Literature and Culture, vol. 4 (2011), pp. 315-27.
- “Choosing to Collaborate: Yi Kwang-su and the Moral Subject in Colonial Korea.” The Journal of Asian Studies, vol. 71, no. 1 (February 2012), pp. 81–102.

=== Other published writing ===
- Studies in Modern Japanese Literature: Essays and Translations in Honor of Edwin McClellan with Alan Tansman and Dennis Washburn, eds. Center for Japanese Studies, University of Michigan (1997). ISBN 0-939512-84-X

== Honors ==
- 1998: Social Science Research Council Grant
- 1997: Association for Asian Studies, John Whitney Hall Book Prize, 1997.
- 1996-97: Mary Weeks Senior Fellowship, Center for the Humanities, Stanford University
- 1994: NEH Summer Stipend
