= Edwin McClellan =

British Japanese academic and translator

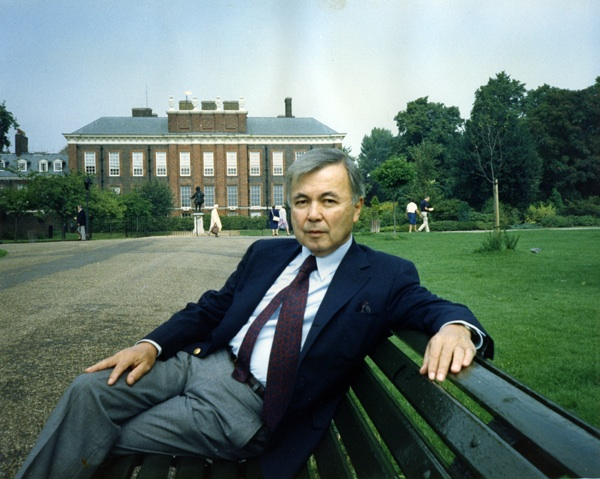
Edwin McClellan

Edwin McClellan (24 October 1925 – 27 April 2009) was a British Japanologist, teacher, writer, translator and interpreter of Japanese literature and culture.

== Biography ==
McClellan was born in Kobe, Japan in 1925 to a Japanese mother, Teruko Yokobori and a British father who worked for Lever Brothers in Japan. His mother and older brother died when he was two. Bilingual from birth and educated at the Canadian Academy in Kobe, McClellan and his father were repatriated to Britain in 1942 aboard the Tatsuta Maru, a passenger liner requisitioned by the Imperial Japanese Navy to repatriate British nationals from throughout Southeast Asia.

In London, McClellan taught Japanese at the School of Oriental and African Studies as part of the war effort. At 18, he joined the Royal Air Force, hoping to become a fighter pilot, but his fluency in Japanese made him more useful to Allied intelligence. He spent the years 1944–1947 in Washington, D.C. and at Langley Air Force Base in Maryland, analyzing intercepted Japanese communications.

In 1948, he went to the University of St. Andrews, where he earned a degree in British history and met his future wife, Rachel Elizabeth Pott. At St. Andrews he also met the noted political theorist Russell Kirk, who took him on as his graduate student at Michigan State University. Two years later, McClellan transferred to the Committee on Social Thought at the University of Chicago to work with classicist David Grene and economist and philosopher Friedrich von Hayek. McClellan appealed to Hayek to write his doctoral dissertation on the novelist Natsume Sōseki, whose work was much admired in Japan but unknown in the West. To persuade Hayek of Sōseki's importance as a writer and interpreter of Japanese modernity, McClellan translated Sōseki's novel Kokoro into English. McClellan's definitive translation of Kokoro was published in 1957.

Awarded his doctorate in 1957, McClellan taught English at Chicago until 1959 when he was asked to create a program in Japanese studies, housed in the university's Oriental Institute. He became full professor and founding chair of the Department of Far Eastern Languages and Civilizations in 1965 and later was made the Carl Darling Buck Professor. In 1972, he moved to Yale University and served as chair of the Department of East Asian Languages and Literature 1973–1982 and 1988–1991. He was appointed as the Sumitomo Professor of Japanese Studies in 1979, the first chair at a U.S. university to be endowed by a Japanese sponsor. In 1999, McClellan was named a Sterling Professor, Yale's highest professorial honor.

McClellan was elected to the American Academy of Arts and Sciences in 1977. In 1998 he was honored by the Japanese government with the Order of the Rising Sun, Gold Rays with Neck Ribbon. His other major awards include the Kikuchi Kan Prize (菊池寛賞) for literature in 1994, the Noma Prize for literary translation in 1995 and the Association for Asian Studies Award for Distinguished Contributions to Asian Studies in 2005.

In addition to his committee work at Chicago and Yale, McClellan served on the board of the Council for International Exchange of Scholars (CIES), the American Advisory Committee of the Japan Foundation, the American Oriental Society, the National Endowment for the Humanities (NEH), the editorial board of the Journal of Japanese Studies and visiting committees in East Asian studies at Harvard and Princeton.

His publications include translations of novels by Natsume Sōseki (in addition to Kokoro, Grass on the Wayside) and Shiga Naoya (A Dark Night's Passing); the translation of a memoir by Yoshikawa Eiji; a book of essays, Two Japanese Novelists: Soseki and Toson; and a biography of 19th-century Japanese "bluestocking" Shibue Io, Woman in a Crested Kimono.

A festschrift published in his honor by the University of Michigan Center for Japanese Studies, notes: "Among McClellan's students his seminars have become lore. ... The depth and breadth of readings these seminars required were a revolution in pedagogy when McClellan first began them over 20 years ago; and they continue to represent an ideal of graduate training in the field. ... He taught his students to ask the most fundamental questions about the literary imagination: how language functions within the history of literary forms and in the context of society, history, politics and the existential yearnings of a singular imagination."

McClellan remained a British citizen until his death. His wife, Rachel, died in January 2009.

== Festschrift ==
A festschrift was published in his honor by the University of Michigan Center for Japanese Studies. The 16 critical essays and selected modern period translations were compiled to demonstrate the high standards set by Professor McClellan. The contributors' work was intended to acknowledge the esteem McClellan earned as teacher and mentor.

- Alan Tansman and Dennis Washburn. (1997). Studies in Modern Japanese Literature: Essays and Translations in Honor of Edwin McClellan. Ann Arbor: Center for Japanese Studies, University of Michigan. ISBN 0-939512-84-X (cloth)

The McClellan Visiting Fellowship in Japanese Studies at Yale was inaugurated in 2000 by the Council on East Asian Studies in honor of Edwin McClellan, who was the Sterling Professor Emeritus of Japanese Literature.

== Honors and awards ==
Order of the Rising Sun (3rd Class) rosette

- 1977 – American Academy of Arts and Sciences.
- 1994 – Kikuchi Kan Prize
- 1995 – Noma Prize, Literary Translation Prize
- 1998 – Order of the Rising Sun, Gold Rays with Neck Ribbon, 1998.
- 2005 – Association for Asian Studies (AAS), Award for Distinguished Contributions to Asian Studies

== Published work ==
- 1969 – Two Japanese Novelists: Soseki and Toson. Chicago: University of Chicago Press. ISBN 978-0-226-55652-9
  - _____. (1971) Tokyo: Tuttle Publishing. ISBN 978-0-8048-3340-0
- 1985 – Woman in the Crested Kimono : The Life of Shibue Io and Her Family Drawn from Mori Ōgai's 'Shibue Chusai'. New Haven: Yale University Press. ISBN 978-0-300-04618-2

=== Translations ===
- Natsume Sōseki. (1957). Kokoro. Chicago: Regnery Gateway. ISBN 0-89526-715-2
  - _____. (1957). Kokoro... ISBN 978-0-8092-6095-9
  - _____. (1967). Kokoro... ISBN 978-0-89526-951-5
  - _____. (1992). Kokoro. Lanham, Maryland: National Book Network. ISBN 0-8191-8248-6
  - _____. (1996). Kokoro... ISBN 978-0-89526-715-3
  - _____. (2002). Kokoro... ISBN 1-57646-585-3
  - _____. (2006). Kokoro... ISBN 0-486-45139-9
  - _____. (2007). Kokoro. London: Peter Owen Ltd. ISBN 978-0-7206-1297-4
- Natsume Sōseki. (1969). Grass on the Wayside. Chicago: University of Chicago Press. ISBN 978-0-226-76831-1
  - _____. (1990). Grass on the Wayside. Ann Arbor: University of Michigan, Center for Japanese Studies. ISBN 978-0-939512-45-4
- Shiga Naoya. (1976) A Dark Night's Passing. Tokyo: Kodansha. ISBN 978-0-87011-279-9 and ISBN 978-0-87011-362-8
- Yoshikawa Eiji. (1993). Fragments of a Past: A Memoir. Tokyo: Kodansha. ISBN 978-4-7700-1732-1 (cloth) and ISBN 978-4-7700-2064-2 (paper)

== See also ==
- Mitsuo Nakamura
- Eto Jun – contributor, Studies ... in Honor of Edwin McClellan.
- Jay Rubin – contributor, Studies ... in Honor of Edwin McClellan.
- John Whittier Treat – contributor, Studies ... in Honor of Edwin McClellan.
