= Dennis Washburn =

American scholar and translator of Japanese literature

Dennis Washburn (born July 30, 1954) is an American academic and translator. He is the Jane and Raphael Bernstein Professor of Asian Studies at Dartmouth College where he has taught since 1992. He has served as chair of the Department of Asian and Middle Eastern Languages and Literatures and is currently chair of the Comparative Literature Program. Washburn has published extensively on Japanese literature and culture and is an active translator of both modern and classical Japanese fiction. In 2004 he received the Japanese Foreign Ministry's citation for contributions to cross-cultural understanding, and in 2008 he received the Japan-US Friendship Commission Translation Prize for translating Tsutomu Mizukami's The Temple of the Wild Geese and Bamboo Dolls of Echizen.

== Education ==
- Harvard University: BA (June, 1976) – While at Harvard University, Dennis studied with some notable figures in American literature, such as Elizabeth Bishop.
- Pembroke College, Oxford University: MA (August, 1979)
- Waseda University: Monbusho Fellow (October, 1983 to March, 1985)
- Yale University: Ph.D. (June, 1991) – Along with Alan Tansman, Dennis earned his Ph.D under the tutelage of Edwin McClellan.

== Selected works ==
=== Academic studies ===
- Translating Mount Fuji: Modern Japanese Fiction and the Ethics of Identity, New York: Columbia University Press, 2006.
- The Dilemma of the Modern in Japanese Fiction, New Haven: Yale University Press, 1995.

=== As editor ===
- Converting Cultures: Ideology, Religion, and Transformations of Modernity (Editor with A. Kevin Reinhart), Leiden: Brill, 2007.
- Word and Image in Japanese Cinema (Editor with Carole Cavanaugh), New York: Cambridge University Press, 2000.

=== Translations from Japanese ===
- Shanghai (上海, Shanhai) by Riichi Yokomitsu, Ann Arbor: Center for Japanese Studies, University of Michigan, 2001.
- The Temple of the Wild Geese (雁の寺, Gan no tera) and Bamboo Dolls of Echizen (越前竹人形, Echizen takeningyō), two novellas by Tsutomu Mizukami, Dalkey Archive Press, 2008.
- Laughing Wolf (笑い狼, Warai okami) by Yūko Tsushima, Ann Arbor: Center for Japanese Studies, University of Michigan, 2011.
- The Tale of Genji (源氏物語, Genji monogatari) by Murasaki Shikibu (unabridged with annotations and with an introduction), New York: W. W. Norton & Co., 2015.
