= The Phoenix Tree and Other Stories =

1985 short story collection by Satoko Kizaki

First English edition (publ. Kodansha)

The Phoenix Tree and Other Stories is a short story collection by Satoko Kizaki. It was translated into English in 1990 by Carol A. Flath. The book contains four stories: "Barefoot", "The Flame Trees", "Mei Hwa Lu", and "The Phoenix Tree". "The Phoenix Tree" is known for being the story that won Kizaki the 1985 Akutagawa Prize.

== Stories ==
- "Barefoot" – Seiko convinces her French lover to commit suicide. When she returns to Japan after his death, she lives with her extended family who abused her as a child.
- "The Flame Trees" – Makiko lives in California in the 1960s. She is pregnant, but is terrified of having a child because of her own childhood trauma in Manchuria, where her mother died and her father was taken by Russian soldiers.
- "Mei Hwa Lu" – A Japanese businessman returns to his childhood village in Manchuria and thinks about his family relationships. He returns to his daughter and wife with a deer heart, and they are disgusted.
- "The Phoenix Tree" – Mitsue cannot marry because of the large burn scar on her face she has had since childhood. As she nurses her aunt, who is dying of breast cancer, she learns that the burn was actually caused by her aunt.

== Critical reception ==
"The Phoenix Tree" (Aogiri (青桐)) won the Akutagawa Prize when it was published in Japan. The story was put together with Kizaki's other stories, including her debut work "Barefoot", when it was published in English.

Each story is about a person who successfully copes with a difficult situation that is rooted in past traumas. Donald J. Pearce wrote as much in a positive review for Library Journal. Publishers Weekly wrote that Kizaki "shattered" the stereotype of the impassive Japanese woman with this work. However, Amy Vladeck Heinrich wrote in World Literature Today that while the stories stand well on their own, putting them together in a collection makes the unresolved endings more obvious. This may make readers more interested in the autobiographical elements of the stories, rather than Kizaki's skill as a writer.

Rebecca Copeland wrote in her review for Japan Quarterly that the stories carry a common theme of alienation, and that the strangeness of the stories underscores the protagonists' feelings of uncertainty. She also points out that the protagonists of "Barefoot", "The Flame Trees", and "The Phoenix Tree" are orphans, which further adds to their sense of displacement. Copeland also says that Kizaki hints at mysteries, but resolves them with simple, unsatisfying answers. She also wrote that Kizaki's writing style is "magical", and that she is especially good at descriptions of nature (potentially because her husband is a botanist).

All of the reviewers said that Flath wrote an elegant, unobtrusive translation.

== See also ==
- The Sunken Temple
