= Tom Hare =

Thomas Hare (born 1952) is the William Sauter LaPorte '28 Professor in Regional Studies and the Chair of the Department of Comparative Literature at Princeton University.

Originally trained as a Japanologist and spending much of his career at Stanford University, Hare has broken new ground by applying post-structuralist analysis of semiotics and discourse of the body to ancient Egyptian language and culture in his book ReMembering Osiris: Number, Gender, and the Word in Ancient Egyptian Representational Systems (1999, Stanford), and, most recently, brought speech-act theory and performance studies to bear on Japanese Noh drama in his translation and commentary on Zeami's Performance Notes (2008, Columbia University Press) for which he received the Japan–U.S. Friendship Commission Prize for the Translation of Japanese Literature given by the Donald Keene Center of Japanese Culture at Columbia University in 2010. He has also written on Kūkai and Kamo no Chōmei.
