= Royall Tyler (academic) =

Japanese-English translator (born 1936)

Royall Tyler (born 1936 in London, England) is a scholar, writer, and translator of Japanese literature. Major works include English translations of The Tale of the Heike (平家物語, Heike Monogatari) which won the 2012 Lois Roth Award, and The Tale of Genji (源氏物語, Genji Monogatari) which received the Japan-US Friendship Commission Translation Prize in 2001.

== Career ==
Tyler completed his B.A. in Far Eastern Languages at Harvard University in 1957. He then obtained a master's degree in Japanese history and PhD in Japanese literature at Columbia University, where he was supervised by Donald Keene. After teaching at Ohio State, the University of Wisconsin-Madison and the University Oslo (Norway) became head of the Japan Centre in the faculty of Asian Studies at the Australian National University in Canberra. With his wife, Susan Tyler, he retired in 2000 to rural New South Wales. Between 1993 and 2023 the couple bred alpacas on their property near the town of Braidwood.

== Honors ==
- Japan-U.S. Friendship Commission Translation Prize, 2002
- Japan Foundation: Japan Foundation Award, 2007
- Order of the Rising Sun, Gold Rays with Neck Ribbon, 2008
- Lois Roth Award, 2012.

== Selected works and translations ==
- Japanese Tales, Pantheon, 1987
- French Folktales, Pantheon, 1989
- Japanese Nô Dramas, Penguin, 1990
- The Miracles of the Kasuga Deity, Columbia University Press, 1992
- The Tale of Genji, Viking, 2001 (hardback) and Penguin, 2002 (softcover)
- Mistress Oriku: Stories from a Tokyo Teahouse by Kawaguchi Matsutarô, Tuttle, 2007
- The Glass Slipper and Other Stories by Yasuoka Shôtarô, Dalkey Archive Press, 2008
- The Ise Stories: Ise monogatari, University of Hawai'i Press, 2010 (with Joshua Mostow)
- Flowers of Grass by Fukunaga Takehiko, Dalkey Archive Press, 2012
- The Tale of the Heike, Penguin, 2012
- A Great Valley Under the Stars, Isobar Press, 2014
- The Castelvecchio Family, by William R. Tyler (formatted and supplemented), 2014
- From the Bamboo-View Pavilion: Takemuki-ga-ki, Blue-Tongue Books, 2016
- A Reading of The Tale of Genji, Blue-Tongue Books, 2016
- Joy, Despair, Illusion, Dreams: Twenty Plays from the Noh Tradition, Columbia University Press, 2024
- The Dawn of the Warrior Age: War Tales from Medieval Japan, Columbia University Press, 2024
- A Shattered Realm: Wars and Lives in Fourteenth-Century Japan, Kindle Direct Publishing, 2024
