= Bamboo Dolls of Echizen =

1963 Japanese novella

- Author: Tsutomu Mizukami
- Original title: Echizen take ningyo
- Translator: Dennis Washburn
- Language: Japanese
- Publisher: Chūōkōron-sha
- Publication date: 1963
- Publication place: Japan
- English publication date: 2008
- Media type: Print

Bamboo Dolls of Echizen (Japanese: 越前竹人形, Hepburn: Echizen take ningyo) is a novella by Japanese writer Tsutomu Mizukami first published in 1963.

== Plot ==
Kisuke Ujiie grows up in the small village of Takekami in Echizen Province as the only child of Kizaemon Ujiie, a widower who lost his wife when Kisuke was only three. From his father, Kisuke has inherited his small stature, but also a distinguished talent for the art of bamboo crafts. When Kizaemon dies, handing down his manufacture to his 21-year-old son, a woman in her thirties named Tamae shows up in the village and asks Kisuke to allow her to say a prayer at his father' grave. She explains that she is from the town of Aware and that his father had treated her kindly years ago. A few weeks later, Kisuke looks for Tamae in Aware, discovering that she is working as a prostitute in the town's illegal pleasure quarters and that his father had once been a regular client of hers. Kisuke takes Tamae as his wife on the grounds that their marriage is celibate, as he sees in Tamae foremost a surrogate mother.

Motivated by a meticulously crafted bamboo doll which his father once had made for Tamae, Kisuke starts making his own dolls, which soon become sought after artifacts. When the head clerk of a Kyoto based artware store, Chūbei, arrives in Takekami for a business call, he recognises Tamae from her early years as a prostitute whom he often frequented. Sexually unsatisfied and out of nostalghia, Tamae gives in to his rough advances, but soon feels guilty for her deed. A few months later, Tamae's health deteriorates, and she learns that she is pregnant by Chūbei. Tamae travels to Kyoto under the pretence that she wants to collect the money Kisuke's customers owe him, but actually wants Chūbei to help her get an abortion. Chūbei seduces her again, only to claim later that he can't find anyone for the procedure, as abortions without the husband's consent are illegal. Tamae eventually loses her child by accident, and she returns to the unknowing Kisuke, helping him in his flourishing business as before. During the next Winter, she falls ill with tuberculosis and finally dies. It is the year 1925.

In the final chapter it is revealed that Kisuke stopped making dolls after Tamae's death and committed suicide three years later. His marker stone stands next to Tamae's and his father's in the bamboo grove which his family once cultivated.

== Background ==
Bamboo Dolls of Echizen was published by Chūōkōron-sha in 1963 and met with critical acclaim, including the praise of writer Jun'ichirō Tanizaki. It became a best-selling book and is still regarded as one of Mizukami's most popular works in Japan.

In his 2004 obituary for Mizukami in The Independent, James Kirkup described Bamboo Dolls of Echizen as being "full of […] peculiar local colour" and "a fascinating ethnographical study of a primitive and spooky culture".

== Translations ==
Bamboo Dolls of Echizen was published in an English translation provided by Dennis Washburn in 2008 as part of a two-novella-anthology (the other being Mizukami's 1961 The Temple of the Wild Geese). It has also been translated into French language.

== Adaptations ==
Mizukami's novella was adapted into a feature film in 1963 by director Kōzaburō Yoshimura and adapted for Japanese television in 1966 and 1973. Mizukami also turned his novella into a stage play, as he did with many of his works.
