= Satoko Kizaki =

Japanese novelist (born 1939)

Satoko Kizaki (木崎 さと子, Kizaki Satoko, born November 6, 1939) is a Japanese novelist. She is best known for The Phoenix Tree (Aogiri), which won the 1985 Akutagawa Prize.

== Early life ==
Kizaki was born on November 6, 1939, in Hsin Cheng, Manchuria. Her birth name is Masako Yokoyama. After Japan's defeat in World War II, Kizaki and her family returned to Japan, where her father worked as a chemistry professor in Toyama prefecture. She graduated from Tokyo Woman's Christian University, Junior College in 1960.

== Career ==
After graduation Kizaki worked at Teijin. She married her husband, a botanist named Hiromu Harada, in 1962, and they both moved to France and had two daughters. They briefly lived in Pasadena, California, but soon returned to France. She studied comparative literature at the University of Paris from 1976 to 1979. She returned to Japan in 1979, and began writing novels, short stories, and essays. In 1980 Kizaki was awarded Bugakukai Prize for New Writers for her debut story, Rasoku. Her novel Shizumeru Tera received the Ministry of Education's Geijutsu Sensho New Writer's Award.

She was awarded the Akutagawa Prize for Aogiri, in 1985. It is a story about a young woman who nurses her aunt as she dies of breast cancer. Though she was awarded the prize two members of the committee were critical of Aogiri. Hideo Nakamura thought it was unlikely that the aunt would choose to die of cancer, while Saiichi Maruya said that her portrayal of the aunt was irresponsible to her readers and the characters. On the other hand, Fumio Niwa was impressed with her portrayal, and Shotaro Yasuoka and Shusaku Endo were impressed that she chose to write about a cancer patient at all.

Kizaki was baptized into the Catholic Church in 1982, which may explain the Christian themes in her work. Her work tends to be about women who overcome physical or spiritual problems. Kizaki has said that she draws spiritual guidance from Thérèse of Lisieux. Her work also hints at mysteries with deep, meaningful answers that end up having simple explanations.

== Publications ==
- "Bare Feet" (Rasoku (裸足), 1982
- The Phoenix Tree and Other Stories (Aogiri (青桐)), 1985
- Umi to Rosoku (海と蝋燭), 1985
- The Sunken Temple (Shizumeru Tera (沈める寺), 1987
- Nami Half Way... (波 ハーフ・ウェイ...), 1988
- Sanzoku no Haka (山賊の墓), 1989
- Kofuku no Tani (幸福の谷), 1990
- Kagami no Tani (鏡の谷), 1990
- Ato naki Niwa ni (跡なき庭に), 1991
- Toki no Shizuku (時の雫), 1991
- Kofuku no Chisana Tobira (幸福の小さな扉), 1994
- Hikaru Numa (光る沼), 1996
- Tanjōseki Monogatari (誕生石物語), 1999
- Hoshi Ochiru Machi no Monogatari (星降る街の物語), 1999
- Yomigaeri no Mori (蘇りの森), 1999
- Hi no Shiro (緋の城), 2002
- Shōsetsu Seisho no Joseitachi (小説 聖書の女性たち), 2004
