= The Tale of Genji =

Classic work of Japanese literature

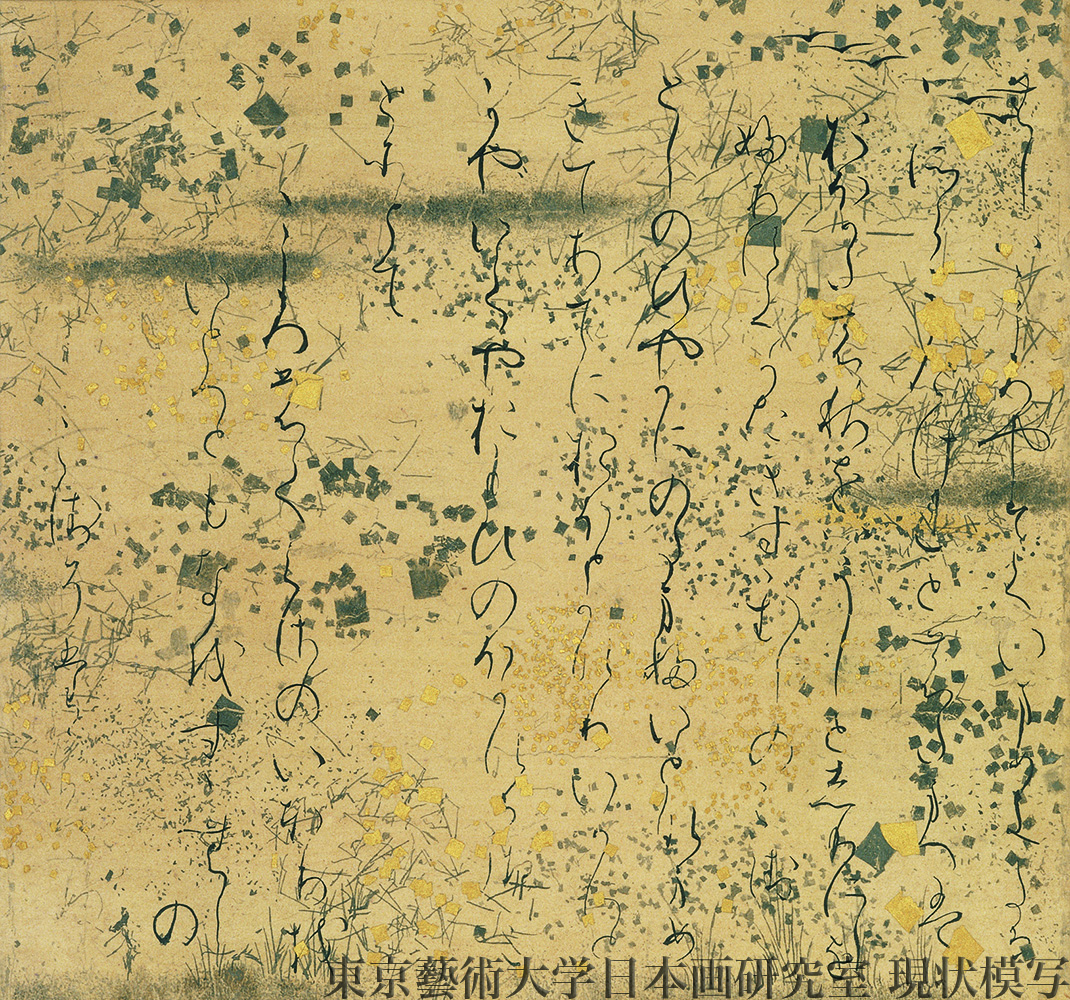
- Written text from the earliest illustrated handscroll (12th century)
- Author: Murasaki Shikibu
- Original title: Genji Monogatari (源氏物語)
- Translator: Suematsu Kenchō, Arthur Waley, Edward G. Seidensticker, Helen McCullough, Royall Tyler, Dennis Washburn
- Language: Early Middle Japanese
- Genre: Monogatari
- Published: Before c. 1021
- Publication place: Japan
- Media type: Manuscript
- Dewey Decimal: 895.63 M93

Japanese name
- Kanji: 源氏物語
- Kana: げんじものがたり
Transcriptions
- Romanization: Genji Monogatari

The Tale of Genji (源氏物語, Genji Monogatari; Japanese pronunciation: [ɡè̞ɲ̟́.ɟ̟͡ʑí mó̞.nó̞.ɡä́.tä̀.ɾʲì, -ŋä́-, ɡé̞ɲ̟́-]) is a classic work of Japanese literature said to have been written by the noblewoman, poet, and lady-in-waiting Murasaki Shikibu around the peak of the Heian period, in the early 11th century. It is the first novel written by a woman to have won global recognition. In Japan, The Tale of Genji has a stature similar to that of Shakespeare's works in English.

The work is a depiction of the lifestyles of high courtiers during the Heian period. It is written mostly in Japanese phonetic script (hiragana), in a vernacular style (not the same as "vernacular Japanese", which only appeared in late 19th century) associated with women's writing of the time, not in Chinese characters (kanji) used for more prestigious literature, and its archaic language and poetic style require specialised study. The original manuscript no longer exists but there are more than 300 later manuscript copies of varying reliability. It was made in "concertina" or orihon style: several sheets of paper pasted together and folded alternately in one direction then the other. In the early 20th century Genji was translated into modern Japanese by the poet Akiko Yosano. The first English translation of Genji was made in 1882 by Suematsu Kencho, but was of poor quality and left incomplete. Arthur Waley translated an almost complete version which excludes only the 38th chapter (Suzumushi/The Bell Cricket) between 1925 and 1933. Since then, complete English translations have been made by Edward Seidensticker, Royall Tyler, and Dennis Washburn.

The first section, chapters 1-33, center on the early life and amorous encounters of Hikaru Genji, or "Shining Genji". Genji is the son of the emperor (known to readers as Emperor Kiritsubo) and a low-ranking concubine called Kiritsubo Consort. However, for political reasons, the emperor removes Genji from the line of succession, demoting him to commoner status by giving him the surname Minamoto. The second section, chapters 34–41, tell of his old age and death, while the final section, chapters 42–54, shift to Genji's grandson, Niou, and supposed son, Kaoru.

== Historical context ==
Murasaki lived at the height of the Fujiwara clan's power. Fujiwara no Michinaga was the regent in all but name, and the most significant political figure of his day. Consequently, Murasaki is believed to have formed the character of Genji partly through her experience of Michinaga.

The Tale of Genji may have been written chapter by chapter, as Murasaki delivered installments to aristocratic women (ladies-in-waiting). It has many elements found in a modern novel: a central character and a large number of major and minor characters, well-developed characterization of the major players, a sequence of events covering the central character's lifetime and beyond. There is no specified plot, but events play out and characters grow older. Despite a dramatis personæ of some four hundred characters, it maintains internal consistency; for instance, all characters age in step, and both family and feudal relationships stay intact throughout.

Almost none of the characters in the original text are given an explicit name. They are instead referred to by their function or role (e.g. Minister of the Left), an honorific (e.g. His Excellency), or their relation to other characters (e.g. Heir Apparent), which changes as the novel progresses. This lack of names stems from Heian-era court manners that would have made it unacceptably familiar and blunt to freely mention a person's given name. Modern readers and translators have used various nicknames to keep track of the many characters.

== Authorship ==
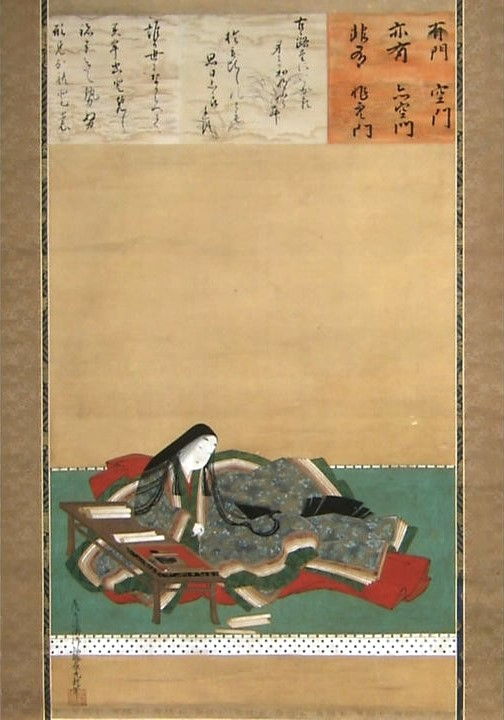
Murasaki Shikibu, illustration by Tosa Mitsuoki who created a series of illustrations of The Tale of Genji (17th century)

There is debate over how much of Genji was actually written by Murasaki Shikibu. Debates over the novel's authorship have gone on for centuries, and are unlikely to ever be settled unless some major archival discovery is made.

It is generally accepted that the tale was finished in its present form by 1021, when the author of the Sarashina Nikki wrote a diary entry about her joy at acquiring a complete copy of the tale. She writes that there are over 50 chapters and mentions a character introduced at the end of the work, so if other authors besides Murasaki did work on the tale, the work was finished very near to the time of her writing. Murasaki's own diary includes a reference to the tale, and indeed the application to herself of the name 'Murasaki' in an allusion to the main female character. That entry confirms that some if not all of the diary was available in 1008 when internal evidence convincingly suggests that the entry was written.

Murasaki is said to have written the character of Genji based on the Minister on the Left at the time she was at court. Other translators, such as Tyler, believe the character Murasaki no Ue, whom Genji marries, is based on Murasaki Shikibu herself.

Yosano Akiko, who made the first modern Japanese translation of Genji, believed that Murasaki had written only chapters 1 to 33, and that chapters 35 to 54 were written by her daughter, Daini no Sanmi. Other scholars have also doubted the authorship of chapters 42 to 54, particularly 44, which contains continuity mistakes (in the rest of the book such mistakes are rare). Royall Tyler writes that computer analysis has turned up "statistically significant" discrepancies of style between chapters 45–54 and the rest, and also among the early chapters.

== Plot ==
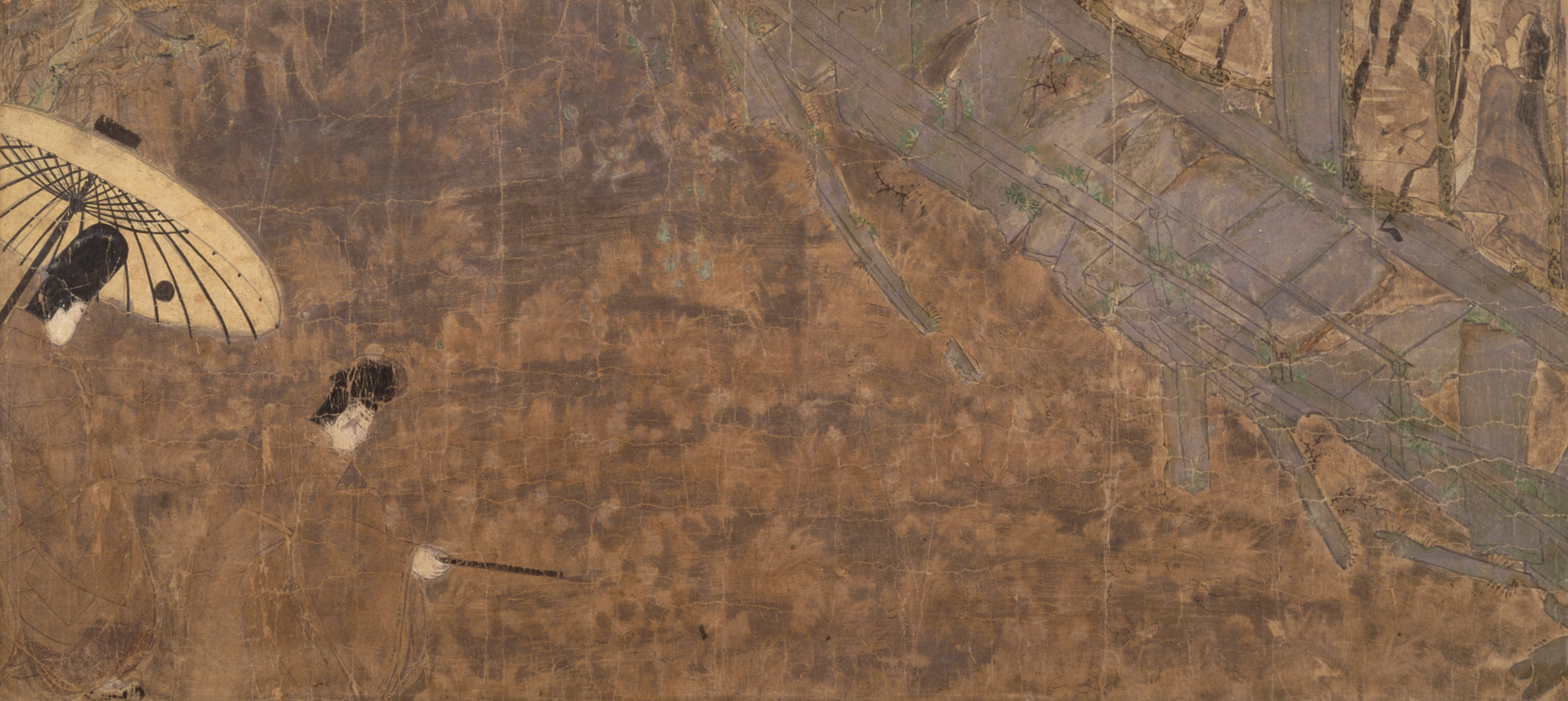
Chapter 15 – Yomogiu (蓬生, "Waste of Weeds"). Scene from the 12th-century illustrated handscroll Genji Monogatari Emaki kept at the Tokugawa Art Museum.

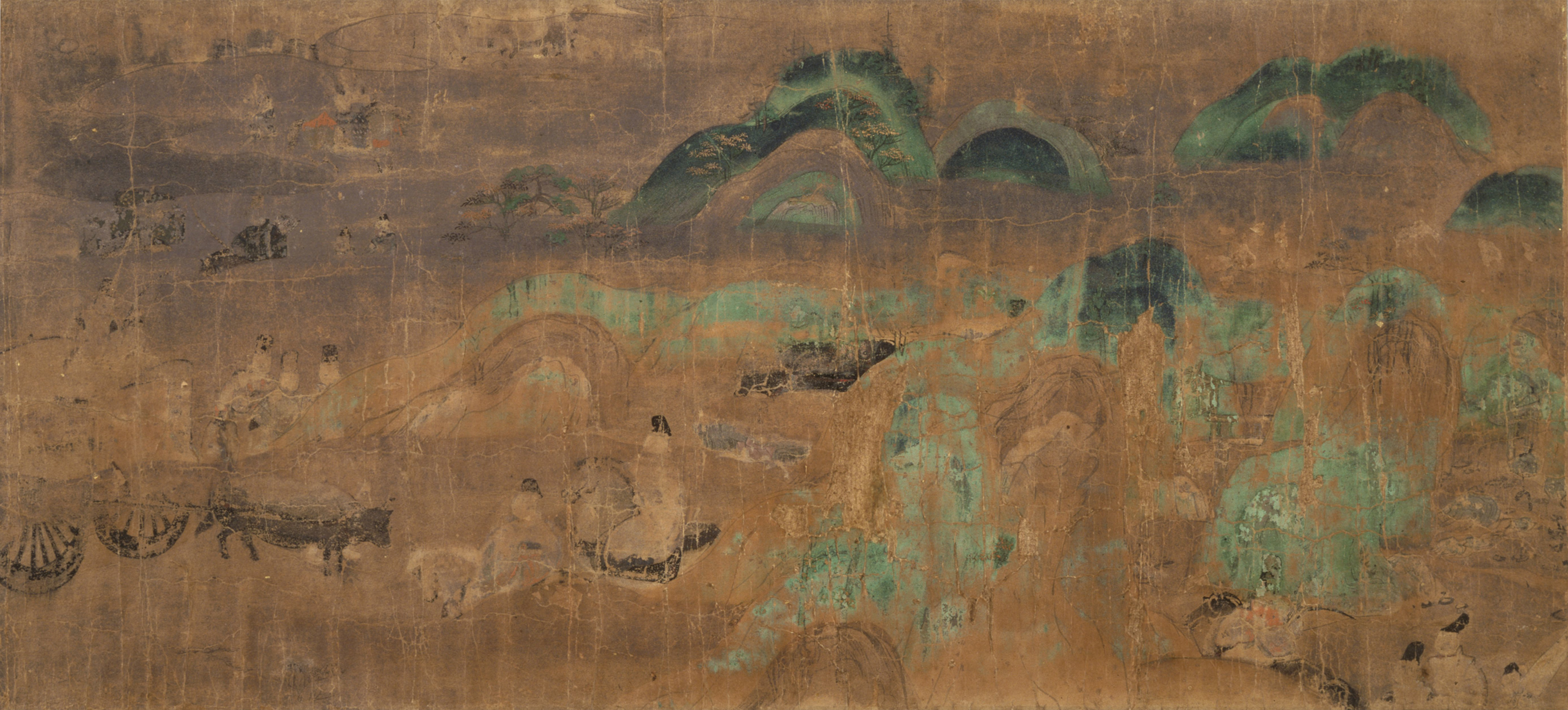
Chapter 16 – Sekiya (関屋, "At The Pass")

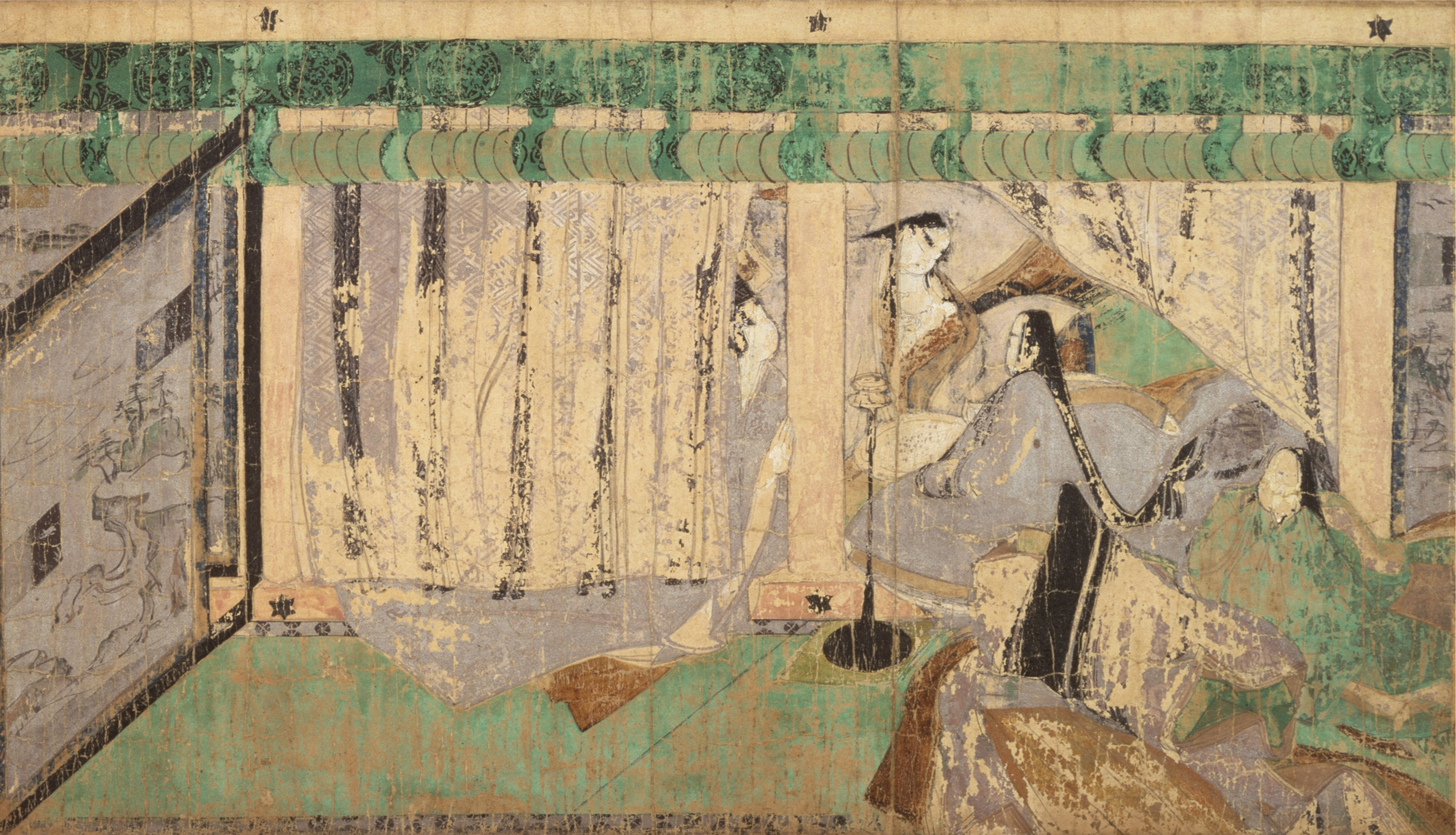
Chapter 37 – Yokobue (横笛, "Flute")

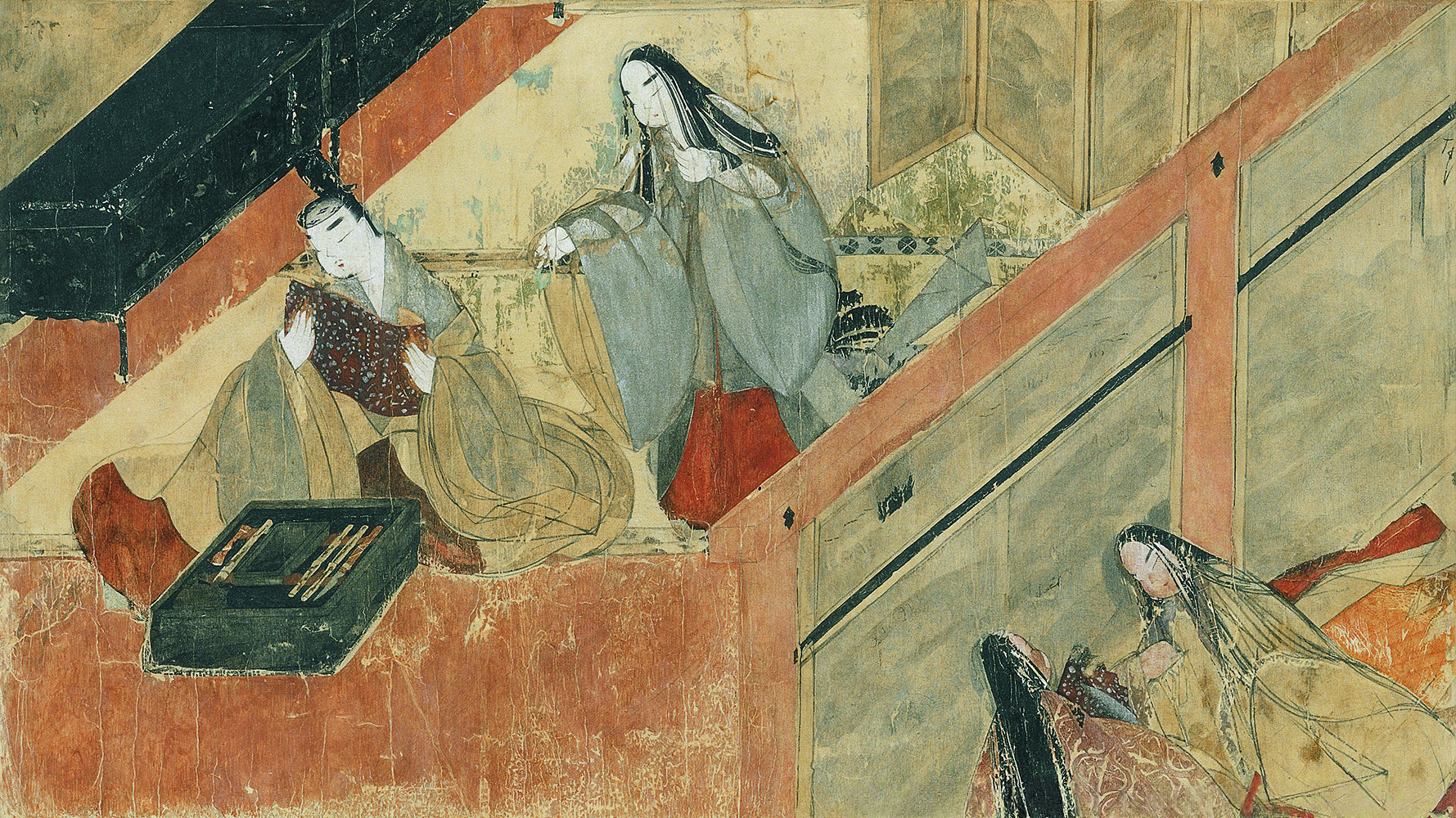
Chapter 39 – Yūgiri (夕霧, "Evening Mist"). 12th-century Gotoh Museum handscroll.

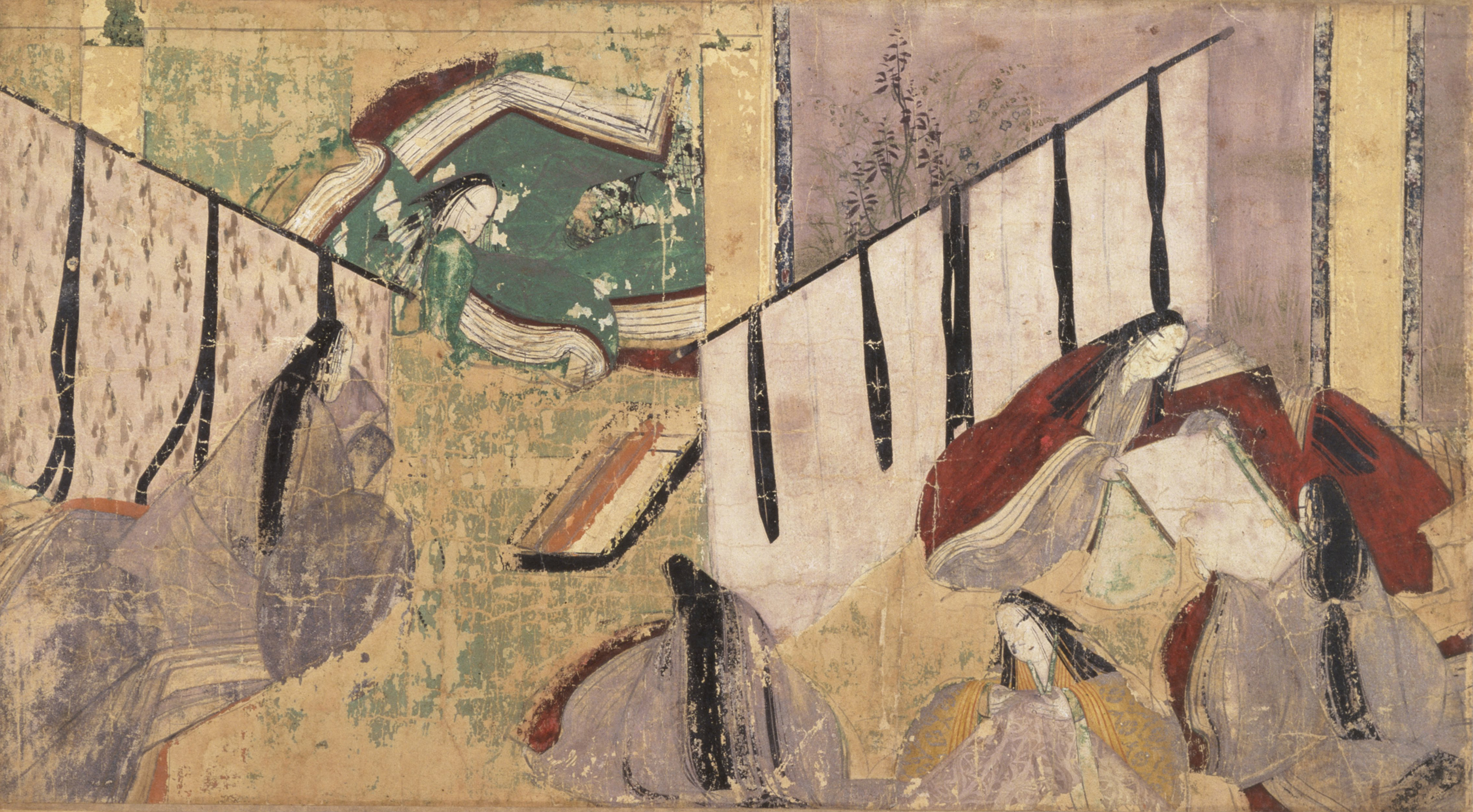
Chapter 48 – Sawarabi (早蕨, "Bracken Shoots"). Tokugawa Art Museum's illustrated handscroll.

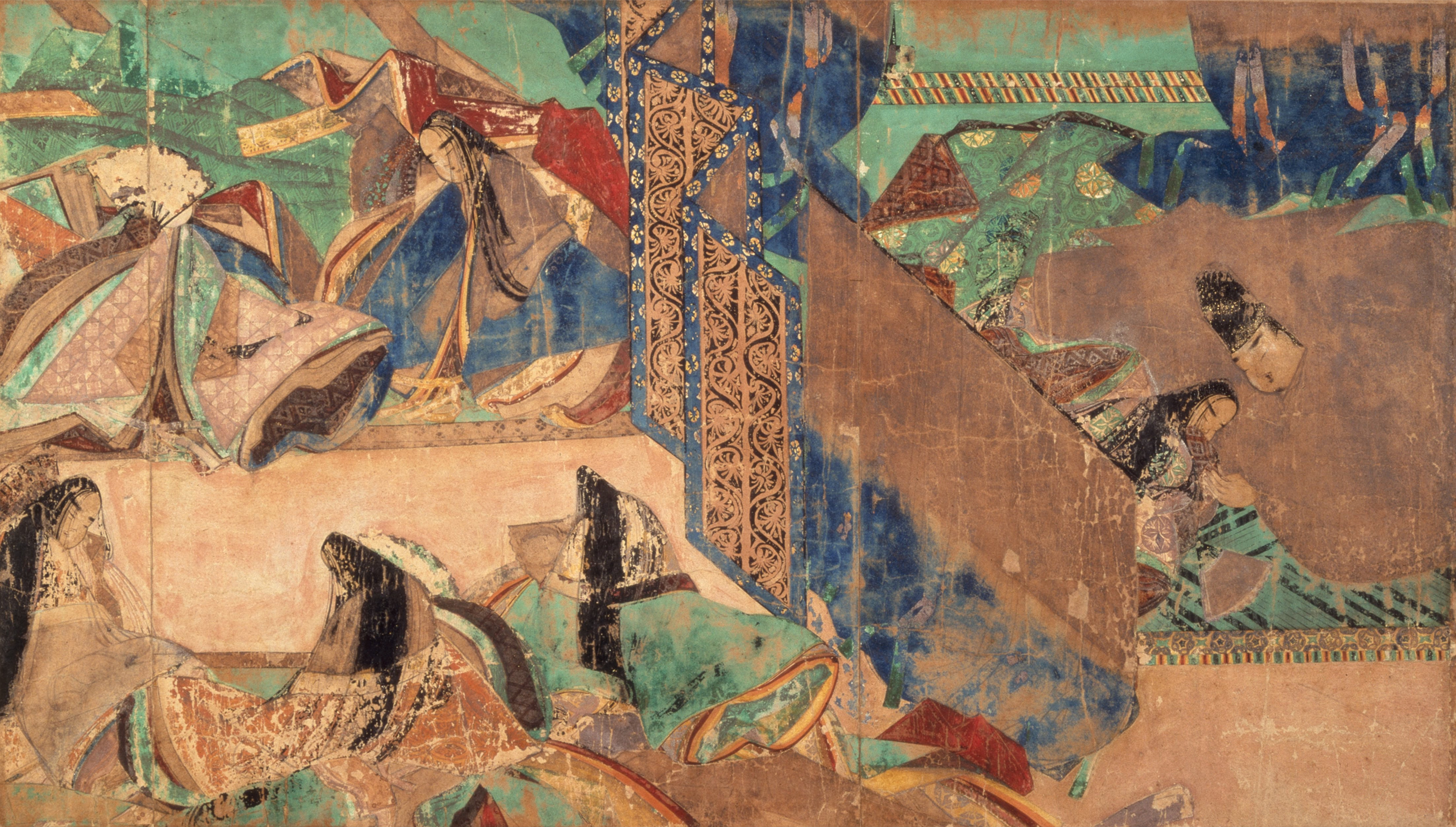
Chapter 49 – Yadorigi (宿り木, "Ivy"). Tokugawa Art Museum's illustrated handscroll.

Genji's mother dies when he is three years old and his father, the Emperor, cannot forget her. The Emperor Kiritsubo then hears of a woman (Lady Fujitsubo), formerly a princess of the preceding emperor, who resembles his deceased concubine, and later she becomes one of his wives. Genji loves her first as a stepmother, but later as a woman, and they fall in love with each other. Genji is frustrated by his forbidden love for the Lady Fujitsubo and is on bad terms with his own wife (Aoi no Ue, the Lady Aoi). He engages in a series of love affairs with many other women. These are however unfulfilling, as in most cases his advances are rebuffed, or his lover dies suddenly, or he becomes bored.

Genji visits Kitayama, a rural hilly area north of Kyoto, where he finds a beautiful ten-year-old girl. He is fascinated by this little girl (Murasaki no Ue), and discovers that she is a niece of the Lady Fujitsubo. Finally he kidnaps her, brings her to his own palace and educates her to be like the Lady Fujitsubo, who is his womanly ideal. During this time Genji also meets Lady Fujitsubo secretly, and she bears his son, Reizei. Everyone except the two lovers believes the father of the child is the Emperor Kiritsubo. Later the boy becomes the Crown Prince and Lady Fujitsubo becomes the Empress, but Genji and Lady Fujitsubo swear to keep the child's true parentage secret.

Genji and his wife, Lady Aoi, reconcile. She gives birth to a son but dies soon after. Genji is sorrowful but finds consolation in Murasaki, whom he marries. Genji's father, the Emperor Kiritsubo, dies. He is succeeded by his son Suzaku, whose mother (Kokiden), together with Kiritsubo's political enemies, take power in the court. Then another of Genji's secret love affairs is exposed: Genji and a concubine of the Emperor Suzaku are discovered while meeting in secret. The Emperor Suzaku confides his personal amusement at Genji's exploits with the woman (Oborozukiyo), but is duty-bound to punish Genji even though he is his half-brother. He exiles Genji to the town of Suma in rural Harima Province (now part of Kobe in Hyōgo Prefecture). There, a prosperous man known as the Akashi Novice (because he is from Akashi in Settsu Province) entertains Genji, and Genji has an affair with Akashi's daughter. She gives birth to Genji's only daughter, who will later become the Empress.

In the capital, the Emperor Suzaku is troubled by dreams of his late father, Kiritsubo, and something begins to affect his eyes. Meanwhile, his mother, Kokiden, grows ill, which weakens her influence over the throne, and leads to the Emperor ordering Genji to be pardoned. Genji returns to Kyoto. His son by Lady Fujitsubo, Reizei, becomes the emperor. The new Emperor Reizei knows Genji is his real father, and raises Genji's rank to the highest possible.

However, when Genji turns 40 years old, his life begins to decline. His political status does not change, but his love and emotional life begin to incrementally diminish as middle age takes hold. He marries another wife, the Third Princess (known as Onna san no miya in the Seidensticker version, or Nyōsan in Waley's). Genji's nephew, Kashiwagi, later rapes the Third Princess, and she bears Kaoru (who, in a similar situation to that of Reizei, is legally known as the son of Genji). Genji's new marriage changes his relationship with Murasaki, who had expressed her wish of becoming a nun (bikuni) though the wish was rejected by Genji.

Genji's beloved Murasaki dies. In the following chapter, Maboroshi ("Illusion"), Genji contemplates how fleeting life is. The next chapter is titled Kumogakure ("Vanished into the Clouds"), which is left blank, but implies the death of Genji.

Chapter 45–54 are known as the "Uji Chapters". These chapters follow Kaoru and his best friend, Niou. Niou is an imperial prince, the son of Genji's daughter, the current Empress now that Reizei has abdicated the throne, while Kaoru is known to the world as Genji's son but is in fact fathered by Genji's nephew. The chapters involve Kaoru and Niou's rivalry over several daughters of an imperial prince who lives in Uji, a place some distance away from the capital. The tale ends abruptly, with Kaoru wondering if Niou is hiding Kaoru's former lover away from him. Kaoru has sometimes been called the first anti-hero in literature.

== Completion ==
The tale has an abrupt ending. Opinions vary on whether this was intended by the author. Arthur Waley, who made the first English translation of the whole of The Tale of Genji, believed that the work as we have it was finished. Ivan Morris, however, author of The World of the Shining Prince, believed that it was not complete and that later chapters were missing. Edward Seidensticker, who made the second translation of the Genji, believed that Murasaki Shikibu had not had a planned story structure with an ending as such but would simply have continued writing as long as she could.

== Literary context ==
Because it was written to entertain the Japanese court of the 11th century, the work presents many difficulties to modern readers. First and foremost, Murasaki's language, Heian-period court Japanese, was highly inflected and had very complex grammar. Another problem is that almost none of the characters are named within the work. Instead, the narrator refers to men often by their rank or their station in life, and to women often by the color of their clothing, or by the words used at a meeting, or by the rank of a prominent male relative. This results in different appellations for the same character, depending on the chapter.

In the Heian period monogatari meant prose fiction in the vernacular of the time (not the same as the "vernacular Japanese" as it is known in the present, which is intelligible to modern Japanese), which was suitable only to women and children who could not read Chinese, the official language of government and religion. Genji was written mostly in kana (Japanese phonetic script), specifically hiragana, and not in kanji. Writing in kanji was at the time a masculine pursuit. Women were generally discreet when using kanji, confining themselves mostly to native Japanese words (yamato kotoba).

Another aspect is the importance of poetry in conversations. Modifying or rephrasing a classic poem according to the current situation was expected behavior in Heian court life, and often served to communicate thinly veiled allusions. The poems in the Genji are often in the classic Japanese tanka form. Many of the poems were well known to the intended audience, so usually only the first few lines are given, and the reader is supposed to complete the thought themselves, leaving the rest – which the reader would be expected to know – unspoken.

Outside of vocabulary related to politics and Buddhism, Genji contains remarkably few Chinese loan words (kango). This has the effect of giving the story a very even smooth flow. However it also introduces confusion: there are a number of homophones (words with the same pronunciation but different meanings); and for modern readers context is not always sufficient to determine which meaning was intended.

== Structure ==
=== Outline ===
The novel is traditionally divided into three parts, the first two dealing with the life of Genji and the last with the early years of two of Genji's prominent descendants, Niou and Kaoru. There are also several short transitional chapters which are usually grouped separately and whose authorships are sometimes questioned.

1. Genji's rise and fall
  1. Youth, chapters 1–33: Love, romance, and exile
  2. Success and setbacks, chapters 34–41: A taste of power and the death of his beloved wife
2. The transition (chapters 42–44): Very short episodes following Genji's death
3. Uji, chapters 45–54: Genji's official and secret descendants, Niou and Kaoru

The 54th and last chapter, "The Floating Bridge of Dreams", is sometimes argued by modern scholars to be a separate part from the Uji part. It seems to continue the story from the previous chapters but has an unusually abstract chapter title. It is the only chapter whose title has no clear reference within the text, although this may be due to the chapter being unfinished. This question is made more difficult by the fact that we do not know exactly when the chapters acquired their titles.

=== List of chapters ===
The English translations here are taken from the Arthur Waley, the Edward Seidensticker, the Royall Tyler, and the Dennis Washburn translations. It is not known for certain when the chapters acquired their titles. Early mentions of the Tale refer to chapter numbers, or contain alternate titles for some of the chapters. This may suggest that the titles were added later. The titles are largely derived from poetry that is quoted within the text, or allusions to various characters.

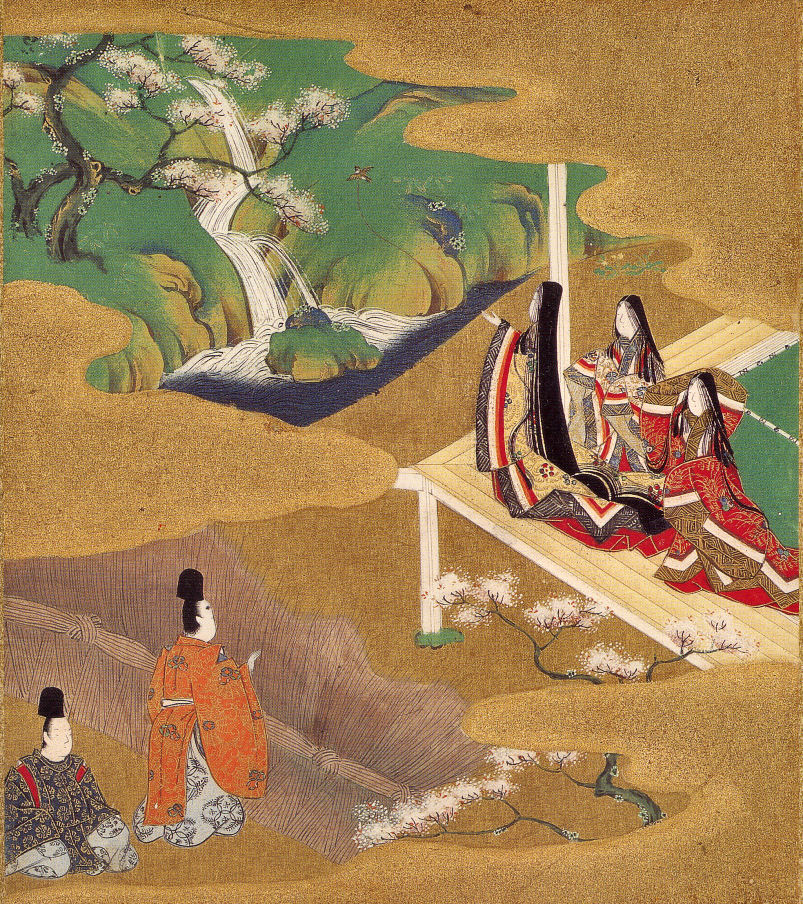
Chapter 5 – Wakamurasaki (若紫, "Young Murasaki"). Tosa Mitsuoki, 1617–91.

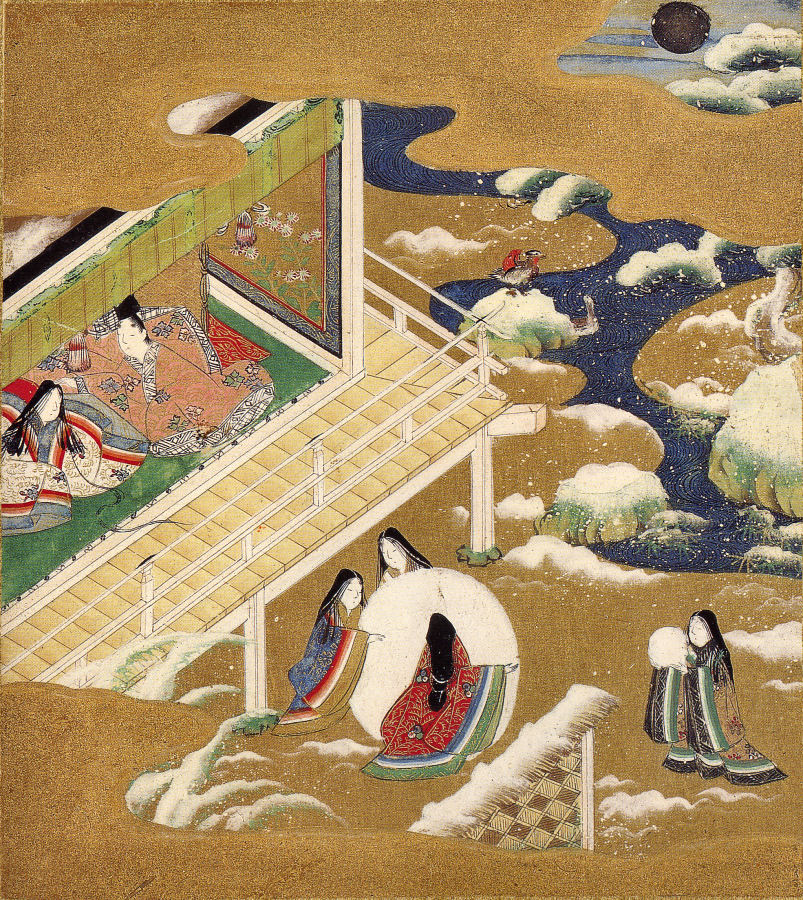
Chapter 20 – Asagao (朝顔, "The Bluebell"). Tosa Mitsuoki.

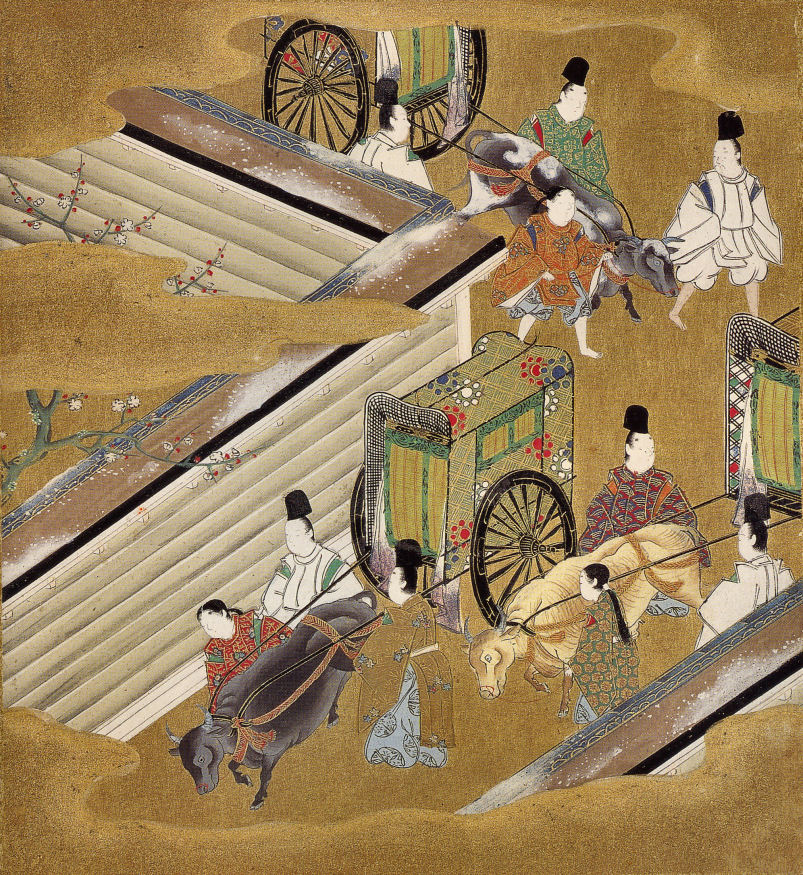
Chapter 42 – Niō no Miya (匂宮, "The Perfumed Prince"). Tosa Mitsuoki.

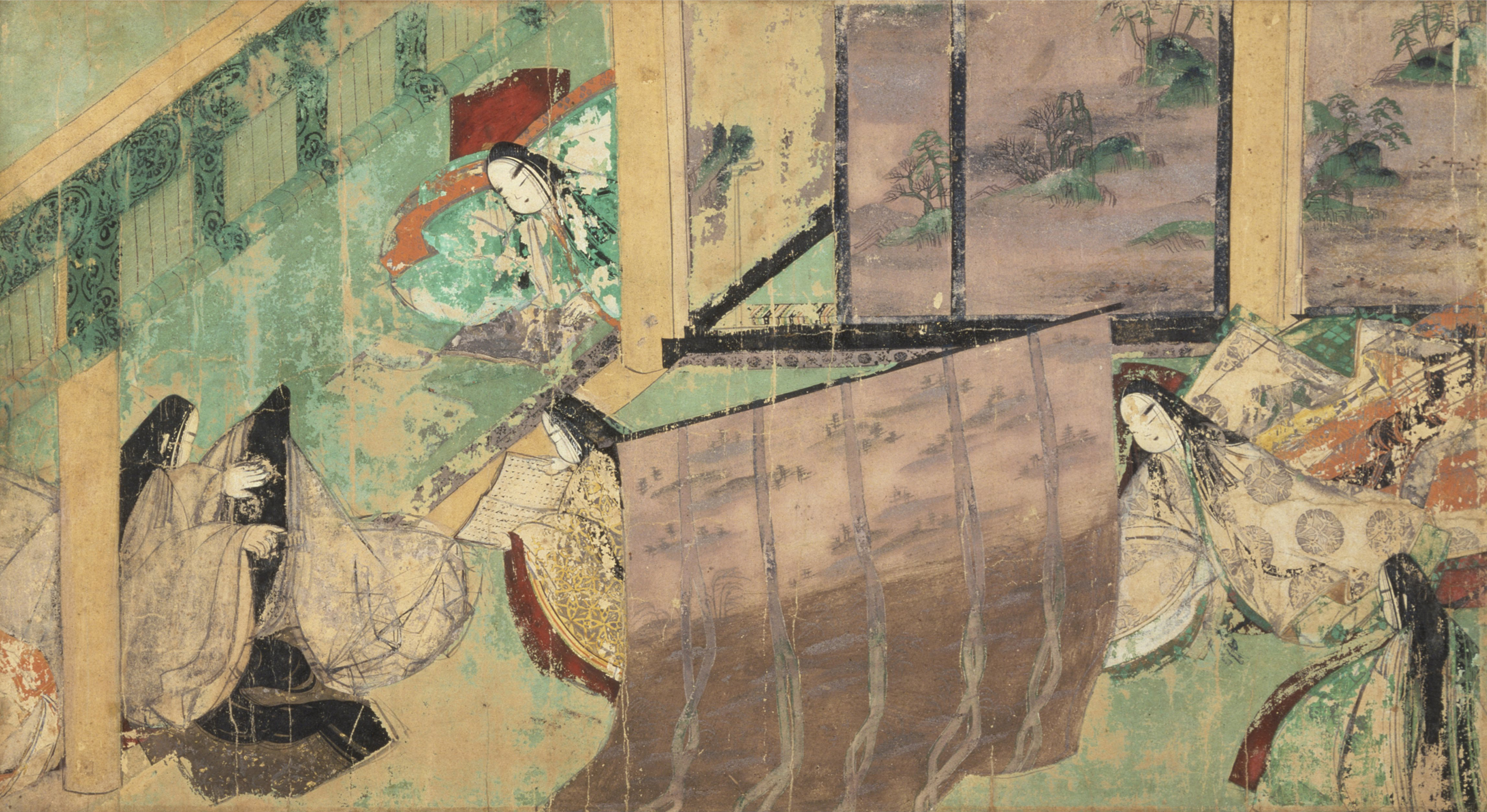
Chapter 50 – Azumaya (東屋, "Eastern Cottage"). 12th-century Tokugawa Art Museum handscroll.

Chapter	Japanese	Waley	Seidensticker	Tyler	Washburn
01	Kiritsubo (桐壺)	"Kiritsubo"	"The Paulownia Court"	"The Paulownia Pavilion"	"The Lady of the Paulownia-Courtyard Chambers"
02	Hahakigi (帚木)	"The Broom-Tree"			"Broom Cypress"
03	Utsusemi (空蝉)	"Utsusemi"	"The Shell of the Locust"	"The Cicada Shell"	"A Molted Cicada Shell"
04	Yūgao (夕顔)	"Yugao"	"Evening Faces"	"The Twilight Beauty"	"The Lady of the Evening Faces"
05	Wakamurasaki (若紫)	"Murasaki"	"Lavender"	"Young Murasaki"	"Little Purple Gromwell"
06	Suetsumuhana (末摘花)	"The Saffron-Flower"	"The Safflower"		
07	Momiji no Ga (紅葉賀)	"The Festival of Red Leaves"	"An Autumn Excursion"	"Beneath the Autumn Leaves"	"An Imperial Celebration of Autumn Foliages"
08	Hana no En (花宴)	"The Flower Feast"	"The Festival of the Cherry Blossoms"	"Under the Cherry Blossoms"	"A Banquet Celebrating Cherry Blossoms"
09	Aoi (葵)	"Aoi"	"Heartvine"	"Heart-to-Heart"	"Leaves of Wild Ginger"
10	Sakaki (賢木)	"The Sacred Tree"		"The Green Branch"	"A Branch of Sacred Evergreens"
11	Hana Chiru Sato (花散里)	"The Village of Falling Flowers"	"The Orange Blossoms"	"Falling Flowers"	"The Lady at the Villa of Scattering Orange Blossoms"
12	Suma (須磨)	"Exile at Suma"	"Suma"		"Exile to Suma"
13	Akashi (明石)	"Akashi"			"The Lady at Akashi"
14	Miotsukushi (澪標)	"The Flood Gauge"	"Channel Buoys"	"The Pilgrimage to Sumiyoshi"	"Channel Markers"
15	Yomogiu (蓬生)	"The Palace in the Tangled Woods"	"The Wormwood Patch"	"A Waste of Weeds"	"A Ruined Villa of Tangled Gardens"
16	Sekiya (関屋)	"A Meeting at the Frontier"	"The Gatehouse"	"At the Pass"	"The Barrier Gate"
17	E Awase (絵合)	"The Picture Competition"	"A Picture Contest"	"The Picture Contest"	"A Contest of Illustrations"
18	Matsukaze (松風)	"The Wind in the Pine-Trees"	"The Wind in the Pines"	"Wind in the Pines"	
19	Usugumo (薄雲)	"A Wreath of Cloud"	"A Rack of Clouds"	"Wisps of Cloud"	"A Thin Veil of Clouds"
20	Asagao (朝顔)	"Asagao"	"The Morning Glory"	"The Bluebell"	"Bellflowers"
21	Otome (乙女)	"The Maiden"		"The Maidens"	"Maidens of the Dance"
22	Tamakazura (玉鬘)	"Tamakatsura"	"The Jewelled Chaplet"	"The Tendril Wreath"	"A Lovely Garland"
23	Hatsune (初音)	"The First Song of the Year"	"The First Warbler"	"The Warbler's First Song"	"First Song of Spring"
24	Kochō (胡蝶)	"The Butterflies"	"Butterflies"		
25	Hotaru (螢)	"The Glow-Worm"	"Fireflies"	"The Fireflies"	"Fireflies"
26	Tokonatsu (常夏)	"A Bed of Carnations"	"Wild Carnation"	"The Pink"	"Wild Pinks"
27	Kagaribi (篝火)	"The Flares"	"Flares"	"The Cressets"	"Cresset Fires"
28	Nowaki (野分)	"The Typhoon"			"An Autumn Tempest"
29	Miyuki (行幸)	"The Royal Visit"	"The Royal Outing"	"The Imperial Progress"	"An Imperial Excursion"
30	Fujibakama (藤袴)	"Blue Trousers"	"Purple Trousers"	"Thoroughwort Flowers"	"Mistflowers"
31	Makibashira (真木柱)	"Makibashira"	"The Cypress Pillar"	"The Handsome Pillar"	"A Beloved Pillar of Cypress"
32	Umegae (梅枝)	"The Spray of Plum-Blossom"	"A Branch of Plum"	"The Plum Tree Branch"	"A Branch of Plum"
33	Fuji no Uraba (藤裏葉)	"Fuji no Uraba"	"Wisteria Leaves"	"New Wisteria Leaves"	"Shoots of Wisteria Leaves"
34	Wakana: Jō (若菜上)	"Wakana, Part I"	"New Herbs, Part I"	"Spring Shoots I"	"Early Spring Greens: Part 1"
35	Wakana: Ge (若菜下)	"Wakana, Part II"	"New Herbs, Part II"	"Spring Shoots II"	"Early Spring Greens: Part 2"
36	Kashiwagi (柏木)	"Kashiwagi"	"The Oak Tree"		
37	Yokobue (横笛)	"The Flute"			"The Transverse Flute"
38	Suzumushi (鈴虫)	(omitted)	"The Bell Cricket"		"Bell Crickets"
39	Yūgiri (夕霧)	"Yugiri"	"Evening Mist"		
40	Minori (御法)	"The Law"	"Rites"	"The Law"	"Rites of Sacred Law"
41	Maboroshi (幻)	"Mirage"	"The Wizard"	"The Seer"	"Spirit Summoner"
X	Kumogakure (雲隠)			"Vanished into the Clouds"	
42	Niō Miya (匂宮)	"Niou"	"His Perfumed Highness"	"The Perfumed Prince"	"The Fragrant Prince"
43	Kōbai (紅梅)	"Kobai"	"The Rose Plum"	"Red Plum Blossoms"	"Red Plum"
44	Takekawa (竹河)	"Bamboo River"			
45	Hashihime (橋姫)	"The Bridge Maiden"	"The Lady at the Bridge"	"The Maiden of the Bridge"	"The Divine Princess at Uji Bridge"
46	Shii ga Moto (椎本)	"At the Foot of the Oak-Tree"	"Beneath the Oak"		"At the Foot of the Oak Tree"
47	Agemaki (総角)	"Agemaki"	"Trefoil Knots"		"A Bowknot Tied in Maiden's Loops"
48	Sawarabi (早蕨)	"Fern-Shoots"	"Early Ferns"	"Bracken Shoots"	"Early Fiddlehead Greens"
49	Yadorigi (宿木)	"The Mistletoe"	"The Ivy"		"Trees Encoiled in Vines of Ivy"
50	Azumaya (東屋)	"The Eastern House"	"The Eastern Cottage"		"A Hut in the Eastern Provinces"
51	Ukifune (浮舟)	"Ukifune"	"A Boat upon the Waters"	"A Drifting Boat"	"A Boat Cast Adrift"
52	Kagerō (蜻蛉)	"The Gossamer-Fly"	"The Drake Fly"	"The Mayfly"	"Ephemerids"
53	Tenarai (手習)	"Writing-Practice"	"The Writing Practice"	"Writing Practice"	"Practising Calligraphy"
54	Yume no Ukihashi (夢浮橋)	"The Bridge of Dreams"	"The Floating Bridge of Dreams"		"A Floating Bridge in a Dream"

The additional chapter between 41 and 42 in some manuscripts is called Kumogakure (雲隠) which means "Vanished into the Clouds"—the chapter is a title only, and is probably intended to evoke Genji's death. Some scholars have posited the earlier existence of a chapter between 1 and 2 which would have introduced some characters that seem to appear very abruptly in the book as it stands.

The Waley translation completely omits the 38th chapter.

Later authors have composed additional chapters, most often either between 41 and 42, or after the end.

== Manuscripts ==
The original manuscript written by Murasaki Shikibu no longer exists. According to Ikeda Kikan, some 300 later manuscript copies exist with differences between each. Murasaki often went back and edited early manuscripts introducing discrepancies from earlier copies.

The manuscripts are classified into three categories:

- Kawachibon (河内本)
- Aobyōshibon (青表紙本)
- Beppon (別本)

In the 13th century, Minamoto no Chikayuki and Fujiwara Teika made two major attempts to edit and revise the differing manuscripts. The Chikayuki manuscript is known as the Kawachibon; edits were many beginning in 1236 and completing in 1255. The Teika manuscript is known as the Aobyōshibon; its edits are more conservative and thought to better represent the original. These two manuscripts were used as the basis for many future copies.

The Beppon category represents all other manuscripts not belonging to either Kawachibon or Aobyōshibon. This includes older but incomplete manuscripts, mixed manuscripts derived from both Kawachibon and Aobyōshibon, and commentaries.

On 10 March 2008, it was announced that a late Kamakura period (1192–1333) manuscript had been found in Kyoto, containing the sixth chapter, Suetsumuhana; the manuscript was 65 pages in length. Most remaining manuscripts are based on copies of the Teika manuscript which introduced revisions in the original; this manuscript, however, belongs to a different lineage and was not influenced by Teika. Professor Yamamoto Tokurō, who examined the manuscript, said, "This is a precious discovery as Kamakura manuscripts are so rare." Professor Katō Yōsuke said, "This is an important discovery as it asserts that non-Teika manuscripts were being read during the Kamakura period."

On 29 October 2008, Konan Women's University announced that a mid-Kamakura period manuscript had been found, containing the 32nd chapter, Umegae. The manuscript was recognized as the oldest extant copy of this chapter, dating to between 1240 and 1280. The manuscript, considered to be of the Beppon category, is 74 pages in length and differs from Aobyōshi manuscripts in at least four places, raising the "possibility that the contents may be closer to the undiscovered Murasaki Shikibu original manuscript".

On 9 October 2019, authorities announced that an original copy of Teika's Aobyōshibon had been found in Tokyo at the home of the current head of the Okochi-Matsudaira clan, who ran the Yoshida Domain. The manuscript is the 5th chapter, Wakamurasaki (若紫), and is the oldest version of the chapter. Blue ink common in Teika's manuscript and handwriting analysis confirmed that the manuscript was written by Teika, making it among the 5 original versions of the Aobyōshibon known to exist.

== Illustrated scrolls ==
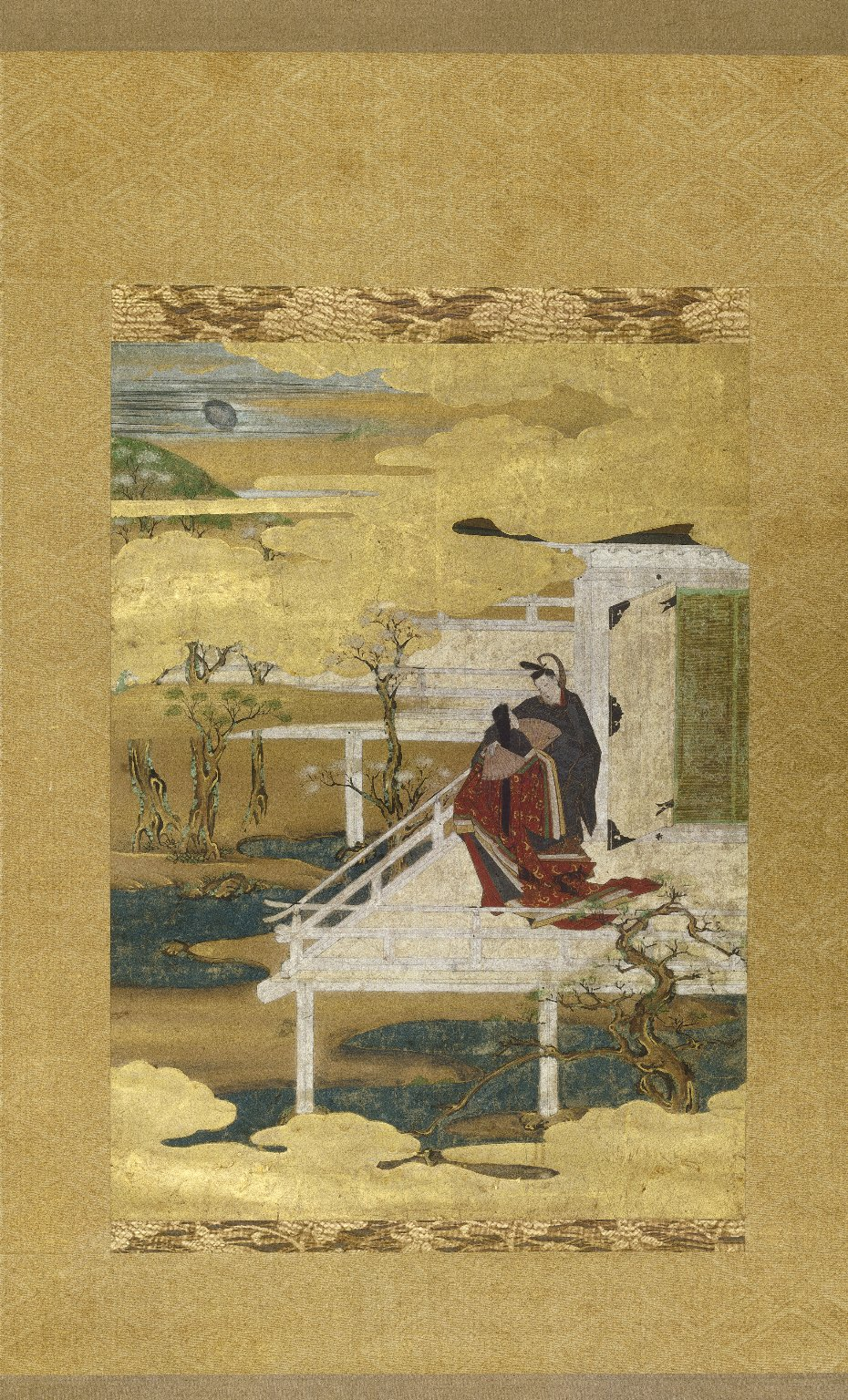
Late-16th- or early-17th-century hanging scroll in ink and gold leaf illustrating a scene from Genji

Numerous illustrations of scenes from Genji have been produced, most notably a 12th-century scroll, the Genji Monogatari Emaki, containing illustrated scenes from Genji together with handwritten sōgana text. This scroll is the earliest extant example of a Japanese "picture scroll": collected illustrations and calligraphy of a single work. The original scroll is believed to have comprised 10–20 rolls and covered all 54 chapters. The extant pieces include only 19 illustrations and 65 pages of text, plus nine pages of fragments. This is estimated at 15% of the envisioned original.

The Tokugawa Art Museum in Nagoya has three of the scrolls handed down in the Owari branch of the Tokugawa clan and one scroll held by the Hachisuka family is now in the Gotoh Museum in Tokyo. The scrolls are designated National Treasures of Japan. The scrolls are so fragile that they normally are not shown in public. The original scrolls in the Tokugawa Museum were shown from 21 November to 29 November in 2009. Since 2001, they have been displayed in the Tokugawa Museum annually for around one week in November. An oversize English photoreproduction and translation was published in limited edition in 1971 by Kodansha International.

Other notable illustrated scrolls of Genji are by Tosa Mitsuoki, who lived from 1617 to 1691. His paintings are closely based on Heian style from the existing scrolls from the 12th century and are fully complete. The tale was also a popular theme in ukiyo-e prints from the Edo period.

== Modern readership ==
=== Japanese ===
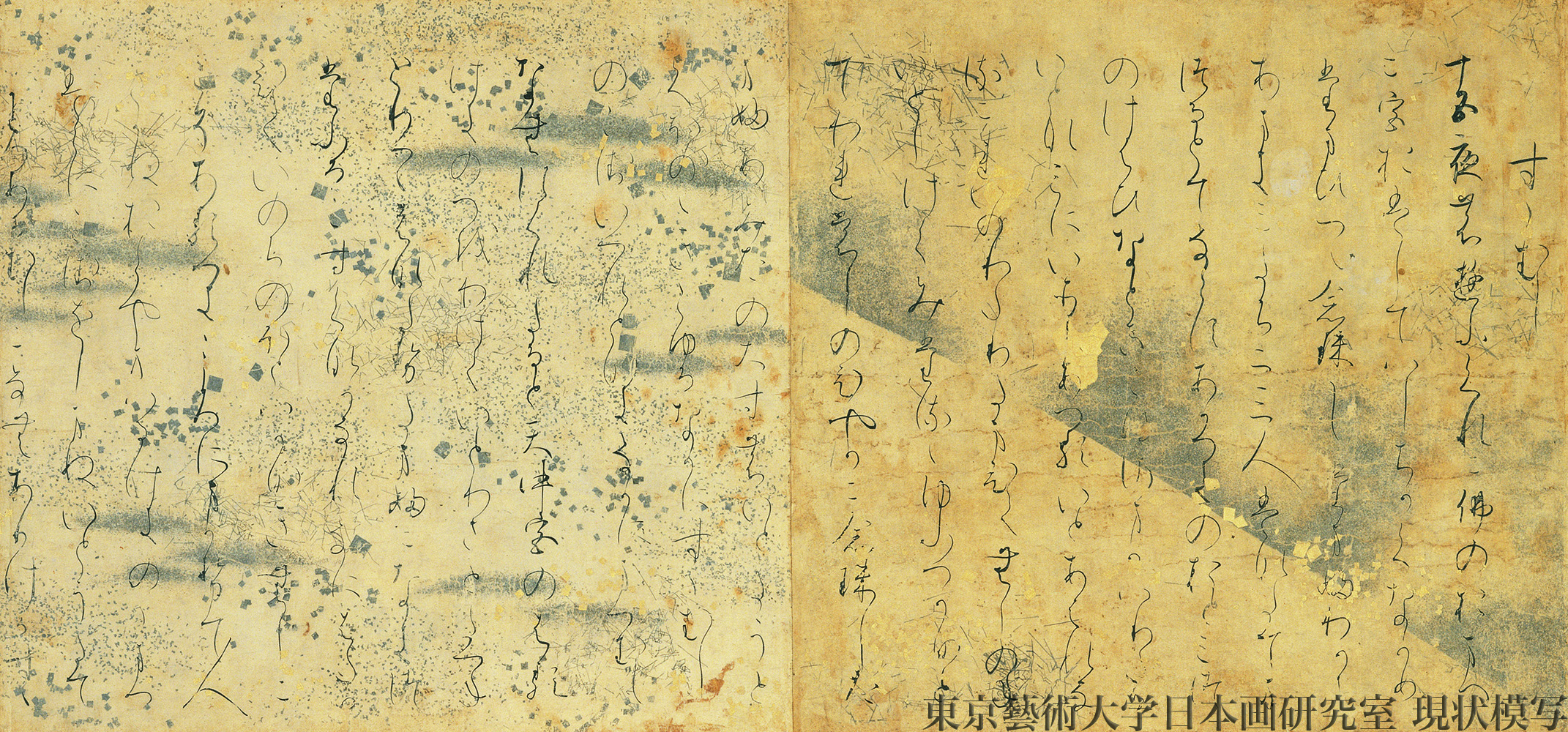
Pages from the illustrated handscroll from the 12th century

The Tale of Genji was written in an archaic court language, and a century after its completion it was difficult to read without specialized study. Annotated and illustrated versions existed as early as the 12th century. It was not until the early 20th century that Genji was translated into modern Japanese by the poet Akiko Yosano. Translations into modern Japanese have made it easier to read though changed some meaning, and has given names to the characters, usually the traditional names used by academics. This gives rise to anachronisms; for instance, Genji's first wife is named Aoi because she is known as the lady of the Aoi chapter, in which she dies.

Other known translations were done by the novelists Jun'ichirō Tanizaki and Fumiko Enchi.

Because of the cultural differences, reading an annotated version of the Genji is quite common, even among Japanese readers. There are several annotated versions by novelists, including Seiko Tanabe, Jakucho Setouchi and Osamu Hashimoto.

=== Translations ===
==== Other than English ====
In addition to the translations into modern Japanese mentioned above.

- Finnish: Kai Nieminen. 2025. Genjin tarina. 2 volumes. Helsinki: Kustannusosakeyhtiö Otava. ISBN 9789511180876 & ISBN 9789511180883 Translation already started in 1980s by Martti Turunen and Kai Nieminen (poems).
- French: René Sieffert. 1977. Le Dit Du Genji. Paris: Publications orientalistes de France. ISBN 9782716900980
- German:
  - Herberth E. Herlitschka: Die Geschichte vom Prinzen Genji, wie sie geschrieben wurde um das Jahr Eintausend unserer Zeitrechnung von Murasaki, genannt Shikibu, Hofdame der Kaiserin von Japan. 2 volumes. Insel-Verlag, Leipzig 1937. (numerous new editions). Translated from Waley.
  - Oscar Benl. Die Geschichte Vom Prinzen Genji. (Zürich: Manesse Verl, Manesse-Bibliothek Der Weltliteratur : Corona-Reihe Vollst. Ausg, 1966; 1992).
- Hindi: लेखिका, मुरासाकी शिकाबू ; अनुवादक, छविनाथ पाण्डेय ; भूमिका, महामहिम सेजिरा योशिज़ावा., et al. गेंजीकी कहानी : जापानी साहित्यका उत्कृष्टतम उपन्यास. , Translated by पाण्डेय, छबिनाथ and Chabinātha Pāṇḍeya, Prathama Hindī saṃskaraṇa, साहित्य अकादेमी की ओरसे ज्ञानमण्डल लिमिटेड, 1957.
- Italian: Maria Teresa Orsi, La storia di Genji, (Torino: Einaudi, 2012) ISBN 978-88-06-14690-0. The first translation from the Japanese rather than from Waley, including all 54 chapters.
- Korean: 柳呈譯., 紫式部, Chŏng Yu, Yu Chŏng, 源氏物語. (Seoul: T’ŭkpyŏlsi: 乙西文化社 1982)
- Russian: The complete Russian translation of The Tale of Genji (Повесть о Гэндзи) was finalised in 1993. The translation was published by Vostochnaya Literatura Publishing House. The work was translated by Tatiana Sokolova-Deliussina and issued in four volumes and Appendix.
- Spanish: Fernando Gutiérrez. Genji Monogatari = Romance de Genji. Lunas, 1992. ISBN 9788476510506
- Ukrainian: The complete Ukrainian translation of The Tale of Genji (Повість про Ґендзі) was finalised in 2022. The translation was published by Folio Publishing House as part of the World Literature Library series. The work was translated by Ivan Dziub and issued in three volumes: The Tale of Genji. Book 1. Chapters 1–20 (2018), Book 2. Chapters 21–38 (2020), and the concluding chapters in 2022. An excerpt from the chapter "The Wind in the Pines" (Вітер у соснах), translated by Y. V. Osadcha, was previously included in the anthology Japanese Literature (2010).
- Urdu: لىڈى موراساکى ؛ مترجم، سيد احتشام حسىن., et al. گنجى کى کهانى : ناول, Translated by حسىن، سيد احتشام، Sayyid Iḥtishām Ḥusain, بک ٹائم،, 2020.

==== Selected English translations ====
The first partial translation of Genji into English was by Suematsu Kenchō, published in 1882. Arthur Waley published a six-volume translation of all but one chapter, with the first volume published in 1925 and the last in 1933. In 1976, Edward Seidensticker published the first complete translation into English, made using a self-consciously "stricter" approach with regards to content if not form. The English translation published in 2001 by Royall Tyler aims at fidelity in content and form to the original text.

The major translations into English are slightly different, reflecting the choices of the translator and the period in which the translation was made. Each version has its merits, its detractors and its advocates, and each is distinguished by the name of the translator. For example, the version translated by Arthur Waley would typically be referred to as "the Waley Genji". In 2025, a team at Boston University launched genjipoems.org to digitize an English translation of the work's poetic content, drawing from full translations by Waley, Seidensticker, Tyler, and Washburn, as well as Edwin Cranston's 2006 translation of its poems.

- The Suematsu Genji (1882) – Suematsu's Genji was the first translation into English, but is considered of poor quality and is not often read today. It includes seventeen of the chapters.
- The Waley Genji (1925–1933) – Waley's Genji is considered a great achievement for his time, although some purists have criticized Waley's changes to the original. Others have criticized as overly-free the manner in which Waley translated the original text. Regardless, it continues to be well-appreciated and widely read today. When the Waley Genji was first published, it was eagerly received. For example, Time explained that "the reviewers' floundering tributes indicate something of its variegated appeal. In limpid prose The Tale combines curiously modern social satire with great charm of narrative. Translator Waley has done service to literature in salvaging to the Occident this masterpiece of the Orient." The translation omits the 38th chapter completely.
- The Seidensticker Genji (1976) – Seidensticker's Genji is an attempt to correct what were perceived to have been Waley's failings without necessarily making his translation obsolete. Seidensticker hews more closely to the original text, but in the interests of readability, he takes some liberties. For example, he identifies most of the characters by name so that the narrative can be more easily followed by a broad-based audience of Western readers.
  - In 2008, a 4,400-page Braille version of the Seidensticker Genji was completed. This Braille edition was the product of five Japanese housewives from Setagaya, Tokyo, working voluntarily for five years and was subsequently donated to the Japan Braille Library (日本点字図書館) and the Library of Congress. It is also available for download.
- The McCullough Genji (1994) – A selection from ten chapters of The Tale of Genji along with selections from The Tale of the Heike, translated by Helen Craig McCullough for Stanford University Press.
- The Tyler Genji (2001) – Tyler's Genji contains more extensive explanatory footnotes and commentary than the previous translations, describing the numerous poetical allusions and cultural aspects of the tale. Tyler consciously attempted to mimic the original style in ways that the previous translations did not. For example, this version does not use names for most characters, identifying them instead by their titles in a manner which was conventional in the context of the 11th-century original text. Writing for The New York Times, reviewer Janice Nimura described it as "wonderfully evocative of the original, [but] can be difficult to follow". According to Michael Wood, Tyler's version "makes a special virtue of attending to a certain ceremonial indirectness in the way the characters address one another. The great temptation for a translator is to say the unsaid things, and Tyler never gives in to it." Machiko Midorikawa notes in a review of Genji translations that more recent translators from classical Japanese "have endeavoured to find ways of preserving more of what once seemed unfamiliar or strange to English readers".
- The Washburn Genji (2015) – Dennis Washburn's Genji separates the poems from the prose and puts interior thoughts in italics. The translation has been received slightly more controversially than Tyler's, with most criticism aimed at the perceived over-clarification of the text and addition of modern colloquialisms.

== Reception and legacy ==
The Tale of Genji is an important work of world literature. Jorge Luis Borges is among the modern authors who have cited it as inspiration. He said of it, "The Tale of Genji, as translated by Arthur Waley, is written with an almost miraculous naturalness, and what interests us is not the exoticism—the horrible word—but rather the human passions of the novel. Such interest is just: Murasaki's work is what one would quite precisely call a psychological novel ... I dare to recommend this book to those who read me. " It is noted for its internal consistency, psychological depiction, and characterization. The novelist Yasunari Kawabata said in his Nobel Prize acceptance speech: "The Tale of Genji in particular is the highest pinnacle of Japanese literature. Even down to our day there has not been a piece of fiction to compare with it."

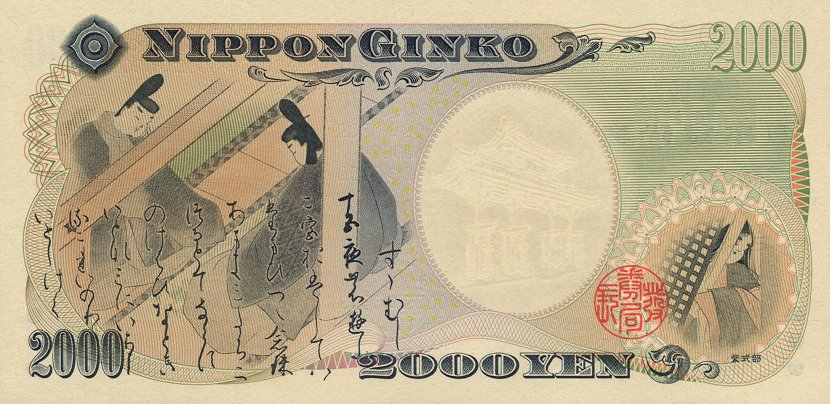
2000 yen note with The Tale of Genji and Murasaki Shikibu on the right corner

The Genji is also often referred to as "the first novel", though there is considerable debate over this; other texts that predate Genji, such as the 7th-century Sanskrit Kādambari, or the Greek and Roman novels from classical antiquity, such as Daphnis and Chloe and the Satyricon, are considered to be novels, and there is debate around whether Genji can even be considered a "novel". Ivan Morris considers the psychological insight, complexity and unity of the work to qualify it for "novel" status while simultaneously disqualifying earlier works of prose fiction. Others see these arguments as subjective and unconvincing.

Related claims, perhaps in an attempt to sidestep these debates, are that Genji is the "first psychological novel" or "historical novel", "the first novel still considered to be a classic" or other more qualified terms. However, critics have almost consistently described The Tale of Genji as the oldest, first, and/or greatest novel in Japanese literature, though enthusiastic proponents may have later neglected the qualifying category of 'in Japanese literature', leading to the debates over the book's place in world literature. Even in Japan, the status of Tale of Genji as "first" is not universally embraced; the slightly earlier Ochikubo Monogatari has been proposed as the "world's first full-length novel", even though its author is unknown. Despite these debates, The Tale of Genji enjoys solid respect, and its influence on Japanese literature has been compared to that of Philip Sidney's Arcadia on English literature.

The novel and other works by Lady Murasaki are staple reading material in the curricula of Japanese schools. The Bank of Japan issued the 2000 yen banknote in her honor, featuring a scene from the novel based on the 12th-century illustrated handscroll. Since a 1 November 1008 entry in The Diary of Lady Murasaki is the oldest date on which a reference to The Tale of Genji has appeared, 1 November was designated as the official day to celebrate Japanese classics. According to Act on Classics Day, the "classics" that are honored not only include literature, but encompass a wide range of arts such as music, art, traditional performing arts, entertainment, lifestyle art including tea ceremony and flower arrangement and other cultural products.

The names of the chapters became a central element in an incense-based game called Genjikō, part of the larger practice of Monkō popular among the nobility. In Genjikō, players must match the scents of a series of five incense samples without being told the names of said samples. Each possible combination was matched to a symbol, called a genji-mon, that represented a chapter from the story.

== Adaptations ==
Many works are derived from The Tale of Genji, including different television dramas and at least five manga adaptations.

Writer Funahashi Seiichi adapted novel for screenplay for kabuki play supervised by Tanizaki Jun'ichirô and directed by the playwright Kubota Mantarô The first part was premiered in March 1951, at the Kabukiza starting Ichikawa Ebizō IX , it was massive successes revived Kabuki popularity during post-war. Some of the major adaptations are:

- 12th-century illustrated hand scroll, Genji Monogatari Emaki
- 1951 film The Tale of Genji by Kōzaburō Yoshimura
- 1966 film by Tetsuji Takechi
- 1980 manga Asaki Yume Mishi by Waki Yamato
- 1981 theatre performance run by the Takarazuka Revue
- 1987 anime film The Tale of Genji by Gisaburō Sugii – covers only the first 12 chapters, while adding in some psychological motivation that is not explicit in the novel.
- 1987 film O Desejado ou As montanhas da lua by Paulo Rocha
- 1988 manga Genji Monogatari by Miyako Maki, which won the Shogakukan Manga Award in 1989.
- 1989 theatre performance run by the Takarazuka Revue
- 2000 opera by Miki Minoru
- 2001 film Sennen no Koi Story of Genji
- 2009 anime series Genji Monogatari Sennenki by Osamu Dezaki
- 2011 film Genji Monogatari: Sennen no Nazo
- 2015 theatre performance run by the Takarazuka Revue; actress Asumi Rio received the Arts Festival award for her portrayal of Genji.
- 2022 manga in English Lady Murasaki’s Tale of Genji by Ai Takita and Sean Michael Wilson

== See also ==
- The Golden Ass
- Ghost stories
- Hagiwara Hiromichi
- Jūnihitoe, the layered, colour-coded robes worn by female members of the Imperial court
- Sudare
- The Pillow Book
- The Tale of Genji Museum
- Tales of Ise
- Yang Guifei
- You Xian Ku

== Bibliography ==
- Allen, James Sloan (2008). "How Beautiful, How Sad," in Worldly Wisdom: Great Books and the Meanings of Life. Savannah: Frederic C. Beil.
- Arntzen, Sonja (2005). "The Heart of History The Tale of Genji". Education About Asia. 10 (3). Association for Asian Studies: 25–30.
- Bargen, Doris G (June 1988). "Spirit Possession in the Context of Dramatic Expressions of Gender Conflict: The Aoi Episode of the Genji monogatari". Harvard Journal of Asiatic Studies. 48 (1): 95–130. doi:10.2307/2719274. JSTOR 2719274.
- Bargen, Doris G (June 1991). "The Search for Things Past in the Genji monogatari". Harvard Journal of Asiatic Studies. 51 (1): 199–232. doi:10.2307/2719245. JSTOR 2719245.
- Bargen, Doris G (1997). A Woman's Weapon : Spirit possession in the Tale of Genji. Honolulu: University of Hawaiʻi Press.
- Bowring, Richard John (1988). Murasaki shikibu, The Tale of Genji. Cambridge; New York: Cambridge University Press.
- Childs, Margaret H (1999). "The value of vulnerability: Sexual coercion and the nature of love in japanese court of literature". Journal of Asian Studies. 58 (4): 1059–80. doi:10.2307/2658495. hdl:1808/16325. JSTOR 2658495. S2CID 161992068.
- Chisholm, Julianne Kaui (November 1994). "The Steel-belted Radial of Karma: The End of Genji". The Journal of the Association of Teachers of Japanese. 28 (2): 183–93. doi:10.2307/489291. JSTOR 489291.
- De Wolf, Charles (2014). "Glimpses of Genji Through the Looking-Glass of Language". The Transactions of the Asiatic Society of Japan. fifth series, volume 6.
- D'Etcheverry, Charo B (2007). Love after The Tale of Genji : Rewriting the World of the Shining Prince. Cambridge, MA: Harvard University Press.
- Field, Norma (1987). The Splendor of Longing in the Tale of Genji. Princeton, NJ: Princeton University Press.
- Friday, Karl (Summer 1988). "Teeth and Claws. Provincial Warriors and the Heian Court". Monumenta Nipponica. 43 (2): 153–85. doi:10.2307/2384742. JSTOR 2384742.
- Gatten, Aileen (Spring 1977). "A Wisp of Smoke. Scent and Character in the Tale of Genji". Monumenta Nipponica. 32 (1): 35–48. doi:10.2307/2384070. JSTOR 2384070.
- Gatten, Aileen (June 1981). "The Order of the Early Chapters in the Genji monogatari". Harvard Journal of Asiatic Studies. 41 (1): 5–46. doi:10.2307/2718998. JSTOR 2718998.
- Gatten, Aileen (April 1986). "Weird Ladies: Narrative Strategy in the Genji monogatari". The Journal of the Association of Teachers of Japanese. 21 (1): 29–48. doi:10.2307/489516. JSTOR 489516.
- Goff, Janet Emily (1991). Noh Drama and the Tale of Genji : The Art of Allusion in Fifteen Classical Plays. Princeton, NJ: Princeton University Press.
- Henitiuk, Valerie (2008). "Going to Bed with Waley: How Murasaki Shikibu Does and Does Not Become World Literature". Comparative Literature Studies. 45 (1): 40–61. doi:10.1353/cls.0.0010. JSTOR 25659632. S2CID 161786027.
- Hirota, Akiko (Fall 1997). "The Tale of Genji: From Heian Classic to Heisei Comic". Journal of Popular Culture. 31 (2): 29–68. doi:10.1111/j.0022-3840.1997.00029.x.
- Jackson, Reginald (2021). A Proximate Remove: Queering Intimacy and Loss in 'The Tale of Genji.' Oakland, CA: University of California Press. doi:10.1525/luminos.106. ISBN 978-0-520-38254-1.
- Kamens, Edward B (1993). Approaches to Teaching Murasaki Shikibu's The Tale of Genji. New York: Modern Language Association of America.
- Kato, Shuichi (1979). A History of Japanese Literature: The First Thousand Years. David Chibbett. New York: Kodansha International, Ltd. ISBN 0-87011-491-3.
- Knapp, Bettina L (Spring 1992). "Lady Murasaki Shikibu's the Tale of Genji: Search for the Mother". Symposium. 46 (1): 34–48. doi:10.1080/00397709.1992.10733759.
- Kornicki, P. F., "Unsuitable Books for Women? "Genji Monogatari" and "Ise Monogatari" in Late Seventeenth-Century Japan", Monumenta Nipponica, Vol. 60, No. 2 (Summer, 2005), pp. 147–93, Sophia University, JSTOR
- Kokusai Bunka Shinkokai, ed. (1970). Introduction to Classic Japanese Literature. Greenwood Printing. ISBN 0-8371-3118-9.
- McCormick, Melissa (2003). "Genji Goes West: The 1510 "Genji Album" and the Visualization of Court and Capital". The Art Bulletin. 85 (1): 54–85. doi:10.2307/3177327. JSTOR 3177327.
- McCullough, William H (1967). "Japanese Marriage Institutions in the Heian Period". Harvard Journal of Asiatic Studies. 27: 103–67. doi:10.2307/2718385. JSTOR 2718385.
- Morris, Ivan I (1964). The World of the Shining Prince: Court Life in Ancient Japan. New York: Kodansha International.
- Morris, Ivan I (1971). The Tale of Genji Scroll [Genji monogatari emaki]. Tokyo: Kodansha International.
- Mostow, Joshua S (Autumn 1992). "Painted Poems, Forgotten Words. Poem-Pictures and Classical Japanese Literature". Monumenta Nipponica. 47 (3): 323–46. doi:10.2307/2385102. JSTOR 2385102.
- Mostow, Joshua S (April 1999). ""Picturing" in The Tale of Genji". The Journal of the Association of Teachers of Japanese. 33 (1): 1–25. doi:10.2307/489628. JSTOR 489628.
- Murase, Miyeko (1983). Iconography of the Tale of Genji : Genji monogatari ekotoba. New York: Weatherhill.
- Murase, Miyeko (2001). The Tale of Genji : Legends and Paintings. New York: G. Braziller.
- Nickerson, Peter (Winter 1993). "The Meaning of Matrilocality. Kinship, Property, and Politics in Mid-Heian". Monumenta Nipponica. 48 (4): 429–67. doi:10.2307/2385292. JSTOR 2385292.
- Nihon Koten Bungaku Daijiten: Kan'yakuban [A Comprehensive Dictionary of Classical Japanese Literature: Concise Edition]. Tōkyō: Iwanami Shoten. 1986. ISBN 4-00-080067-1. OCLC 22820487.
- Okada, H. Richard (1991). Figures of Resistance : Language, Poetry, and Narrating in the Tale of Genji and Other Mid-Heian Texts. Durham: Duke University Press.
- Pekarik, Andrew (1982). Ukifune : Love in the tale of genji. New York: Columbia University Press.
- Puette, William J (1983). Guide to the Tale of Genji by Murasaki Shikibu. Rutland, VT: C.E. Tuttle. ISBN 9780804814546.
- Rowley, Gillian Gaye (2000). Yosano Akiko and the Tale of Genji. Ann Arbor: Center for Japanese Studies, University of Michigan.
- Sestili Daniele (1996). Musica e danza del principe Genji. Le arti dello spettacolo nell’antico Giappone. Lucca: LIM,
- Shirane, Haruo (December 1985). "The Aesthetics of Power: Politics in the Tale of Genji". Harvard Journal of Asiatic Studies. 45 (2): 615–47. doi:10.2307/2718974. JSTOR 2718974.
- Shirane, Haruo (1987). The Bridge of Dreams : A Poetics of the Tale of Genji. Stanford: Stanford University Press.
- Shirane, Haruo (2008). Envisioning the Tale of Genji: Media, Gender, and Cultural Production. New York: Columbia University Press.
- Stevenson and Ho, Barbara and Cynthia O (2000). Crossing the Bridge : Comparative Essays on Medieval European and Heian Japanese Women Writers. New York: Palgrave. ISBN 9780312221676.
- Tyler, Royall (1999). "'I Am I': Genji and Murasaki". Monumenta Nipponica. 54 (4): 435–80. doi:10.2307/2668318. JSTOR 2668318.
- Tyler, Royall (March 2002). "Marriage, Rank and Rape in The Tale of Genji". Intersections: Gender, History and Culture in the Asian Context. 7.
- Tyler, Royall and Susan (2002). "The Possession of Ukifune". Asiatica Venetiana. 5: 177–209.
- Tyler, Royall (2003). "Rivalry, Triumph, Folly, Revenge: A Plot Line through the Tale of Genji". Journal of Japanese Studies. 29 (2): 251–87.
- Ury, Marian (1988). "A Heian Note on the Supernatural". The Journal of the Association of Teachers of Japanese. 22 (2): 189–94. doi:10.2307/488941. JSTOR 488941.
- Lawrence, Hollendaisde (1958). Nihon Koten Bungaku Taikei 14: Genji Monogatari 1 (in Japanese). Tōkyō: Iwanami Shoten. ISBN 4-00-060014-1.
- Yoda, Tomiko (December 1999). "Fractured Dialogues: Mono no aware and Poetic Communication in the Tale of Genji". Harvard Journal of Asiatic Studies. 59 (2): 523–57. doi:10.2307/2652721. JSTOR 2652721.
