= Tsutomu Mizukami =

Japanese writer (1919–2004)

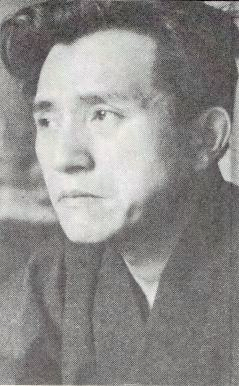
- Tsutomu Mizukami in 1963
- Born: 8 March 1919; Wakasa, Fukui Prefecture, Japan
- Died: 8 September 2004 (aged 85); Nagano Prefecture, Japan
- Occupation: Writer
- Children: Seiichiro Kuboshima (son)

Tsutomu Mizukami (水上勉, Mizukami Tsutomu; 8 March 1919 – 8 September 2004), also known as Tsutomu Minakami, (Note: The original characters of Mizukami's family name can also be read as Minakami. The standard reading has been set to Mizukami.) was a Japanese writer of novels, biographies, and plays. Mizukami's major works include The Temple of the Wild Geese, Kiga kaikyō and Bamboo Dolls of Echizen. His writings earned him, among other awards, the Tanizaki Prize and the Naoki Prize.

== Biography ==
Mizukami was born in Wakasa, Fukui Prefecture, to a poor family. In 1929, he became a novice in a Zen temple in Kyoto, moving between the branch temples. Disillusioned by the conduct of the temple's head priest, he left the temple in 1936, the same year in which he finished Middle School.

Mizukami entered Ritsumeikan University in 1937, but unable to keep up with his schedule while working, he withdrew already half a year later. After World War II, during which he worked in a variety of jobs, he studied under writer Kōji Uno, and in 1948 published the autobiographical novel Furaipan no uta (lit. "Song of the frying pan"). The novel was a moderate success, but the attention received fell short of Mizukami's expectations. As a result, but also due to a divorce and his daughter's illness, he did not publish again before 1959. His novels Kiri to kage (lit. "Fog and shadow", 1959) and Umi no kiba (lit. "The sea's fangs", 1960), the latter of which centered on Minamata disease, started his career as a writer of detective stories which incorporated social themes.

His autobiographic novella The Temple of the Wild Geese about the relationship between a mundane priest, his mistress and a young acolyte received the Naoki Prize in 1961. He followed this with Kiga kaikyō (lit. "Starvation straits", 1962), Gobanchō Yūgirirō (lit. "The Yūgiri brothel at Gobanchō", 1962) and Bamboo Dolls of Echizen (1963). Starting in the 1970s, Mizukami repeatedly turned to biographic works, such as Uno Kōji (1971) about his former mentor, Ikkyū (1975), a biography of 15th century monk and poet Sōjun Ikkyū, for which he received the Tanizaki Prize, and Ryōkan (1984) about Taigu Ryōkan, an Edo period monk known for his poetry and calligraphy.

Mizukami was a member of the Japan Art Academy and was honoured as a Person of Cultural Merit in 1986.

== Works (selected) ==
- 1948: Furaipan no uta
- 1959: Kiri to kage
- 1959: Umi no kiba
- 1961: The Temple of the Wild Geese (Gan no tera)
- 1962: Kiga kaikyō
- 1962: Gobanchō Yūgirirō
- 1963: Bamboo Dolls of Echizen (Echizen take ningyo)
- 1971: Uno Kōji
- 1975: Ikkyū
- 1977: Teradomari
- 1979: Kinkaku enjō
- 1984: Ryōkan
- 2002: Utsutake no fue

== Adaptations (selected) ==
- 1962: Temple of Wild Geese, dir. Yūzō Kawashima
- 1963: Bamboo Doll of Echizen, dir. Kōzaburō Yoshimura
- 1965: A Fugitive from the Past, dir. Tomu Uchida (based on Kiga kaikyō)
- 1983: Hakujasho, dir. Shunya Itō
- 2022: The Zen Diary, dir. Yuji Nakae

== Translations ==
- Mizukami, Tsutomu (2008). The Temple of the Wild Geese and Bamboo Dolls of Echizen. Translated by Washburn, Dennis. Champaign and London: Dalkey Archive Press.
- Mizukami, Tsutomu (2006). "One Night With Mother". In Rimer, J. Thomas; Angles, Jeffrey (eds.). Japan: A Traveler's Literary Companion. Translated by Ōmori, Kyōko. Berkeley: Whereabouts Press.
- Mizukami, Tsutomu (1989). Boonah, the Tree-Climbing Frog. Translated by Miller, Scott. Ginzaya Publishing Company.
