= The Temple of the Wild Geese =

1961 Japanese novella

- Author: Tsutomu Mizukami
- Original title: Gan no tera
- Translator: Dennis Washburn
- Language: Japanese
- Publisher: Bungeishunjū
- Publication date: 1961
- Publication place: Japan
- English publication date: 2008
- Media type: Print

The Temple of the Wild Geese (Japanese: 雁の寺, Hepburn: Gan no tera) is an autobiographical novella by Japanese writer Tsutomu Mizukami first published in 1961. It received the Naoki Prize the same year.

== Plot ==
Shortly before his death, painter Nangaku asks Jikai, head priest of the Kohōan Zen Buddhist temple in the outskirts of Kyoto, to take care of his mistress Satoko. The married Nangaku had once decorated the temple's interiors with his paintings of wild geese and, while working on these, shared a room with Satoko in the temple's facilities. Jikai does as he has been asked and takes Satoko in, immediately making her his mistress and starting a feverish affair with her, although he is 25 years her senior. Meanwhile, Jikai's novice Jinen, an intelligent but disfigured boy, lives an austere life under the head priest's tight rein, who himself leads a mundane life and regularly gets drunk when playing Go with priests from affiliated temples. When Jinen, exhausted from military training at school, oversleeps, Jikai even attaches a rope to Jinen's wrist, waking him up by pulling it. Satoko learns that Jinen had been abandoned by his natural parents as a child and, intending to comfort him, makes sexual advances towards him.

One day, Heikichi Hisama, one of the temple's patrons, shows up and asks for an anniversary service in remembrance of his deceased father, at the same time declaring that the eldest of his brothers is lying on the deathbed. Jikai sends Jinen to hold the service instead and goes out, but does not return. When the eldest brother dies and Jikai remains missing, a priest of an affiliated temple holds the funeral service. Jikai's colleagues speculate if he went on an ascetic's journey, died somewhere due to his repeated drinking, or simply ran away from Satoko, but the case remains unsolved.

In the concluding chapter it is revealed that Jinen murdered Jikai upon his drunken return home, later disposing of the body by hiding it in the coffin of the deceased eldest brother of the Hisama family. Jinen then announces to the unknowing Satoko that he will follow on Jikai's path and disappears after tearing out a detail from the geese paintings showing a female goose and her offspring.

== Background ==
Mizukami (b. 1919) became a novice in a Kyoto-based Zen temple in 1929, moving between the branch temples before finally breaking ties with the head priest in 1936. His novella, an artistic realisation of this period in his life, was published by Bungeishunjū in 1961 and awarded the same year's Naoki Prize.

In his 2004 obituary for Mizukami in The Independent, James Kirkup called The Temple of the Wild Geese a "finely atmospheric" work, whose thriller techniques "are on a par with those of Georges Simenon, Patricia Highsmith, François Mauriac and Leonardo Sciascia".

== Translations ==
The Temple of the Wild Geese was published in an English translation provided by Dennis Washburn in 2008 as part of a two-novella-anthology (the other being Mizukami's 1963 Bamboo Dolls of Echizen). It has also been translated into French and German language.

== Adaptations ==
Mizukami's novella was adapted into a feature film in 1962 by director Yūzō Kawashima and remade for Japanese television in 1989. Mizukami also turned his novella into a stage play, as he did with many of his works.
