= The Sunken Temple =

1987 novel by Satoko Kizaki

The Sunken Temple (Shizumeru Tera (沈める寺)) is a 1987 novel by Satoko Kizaki. It was translated into English in 1994 by Carol A. Flath. While it was well received in Japan, reviewers of the English version had mixed feelings.

== Synopsis ==
Yuko lives in a Buddhist temple called the Shoenji in a town called Hie in the Hokuriku mountains. Her son, Harumitsu, returns home one summer, and Yuko finds that he does not want to take over the family temple. Instead, he would rather sketch, play guitar, or pursuing Chikoni, a young woman who supposedly has magic powers. A boy named Shoji also returns to town to live with his father, the assistant priest, after his mother had spirited him away to Tokyo. Finally, Yuko's childhood friend Fujiki returns to town. The story follows the relationships between the returning men and the three women who live in the temple or the town: Yuko, Chikoni, and Akemi (a young Noh actress).

== Reception ==
The Sunken Temple received the Ministry of Education's Geijutsu Sensho New Writer's Award.

The English translation received mixed reviews. Publishers Weekly wrote that the prose was "well-written and evocative", but said that the ending felt rushed. Kirkus Reviews said it was "disappointing", writing that while it had an "evocative setting and premise", the themes were heavy-handed. In World Literature Today Marleigh Grayer Ryan wrote that readers may find the large number of characters and relationships difficult to keep track of. This could, however, be intentional. Rebecca L. Copeland wrote in a review for Japan Quarterly that the characters and relationships blur together as they do similar things. Even Yuko regularly confuses Harumitsu and Fujiki. However, like other reviewers Copeland was unimpressed by the novel. She wrote that the flap copy of the book said that it's a suspense novel, but readers can easily guess what will happen based on character tropes and imagery. She also wrote that Kizaki tends to overwrite, spoiling the book's eerie atmosphere.

Kizaki refers to other works of Japanese literature throughout the novel. She regularly refers to the legend of Urashima Taro, suggesting that the men's return to the village to the titular character, while the women are like the Sea Princess in the same legend. Copeland also suggests that Kizaki's constant references to snakes when writing about the women refers to the noh play Dojoji, which also takes place at a Buddhist temple.
