= Kōji Uno =

Japanese author

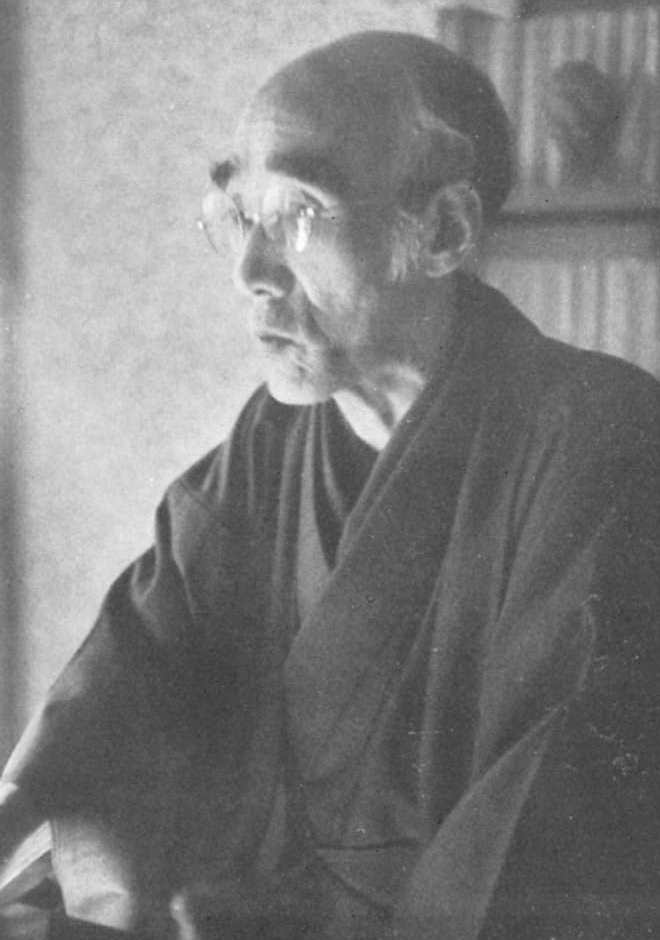
Uno in 1953

Kōji Uno (宇野 浩二, Uno Kōji, July 26, 1891 - September 21, 1961) was a noted Japanese novelist and short story writer.

Uno was born in Fukuoka to parents of Samurai origin. His grandfather was a police captain and his father a teacher. After his father's death when Uno was four, his family lost all their savings speculating in the stock market. When Uno was eight, he was sent to live with his grandmother and an uncle in Sōemonchō as his mother became a waitress. There he lived, beside the Dōtonbori entertainment district, among geisha, prostitutes, wig-makers, and gamblers, as he attended Rikugun elementary school from 1899 to 1901. He attended Tennōji middle school, where he learned to read English and acquired a taste for Nikolai Gogol's fiction. In 1910 he moved to Tokyo to study English literature at Waseda University, where he read Symbolist poetry and Russian modernists including Leonid Andreyev, Mikhail Artsybashev, Konstantin Balmont, Aleksandr Kuprin, Fyodor Sologub, and Boris Konstantinovich Zaytsev.

At age 28, Uno published his first major work, "In the Storehouse", whose colloquial and ironic style was criticized as "flippant" and "popular". After seven years (1927–1933) of mental illness and silence, his publications became more conventional and Uno participated in the literary life of the day. During World War II, he wrote essays on literary life in the Taishō period (1912–1926).

He received the Yomiuri Prize in 1950 for his 1948 novel Omoigawa (思ひ川, River of Thought), and highly praised for his 1951 critical biography of author Ryūnosuke Akutagawa. In 1953 he campaigned for the release of twenty Communist factory workers accused of sabotaging a Japan National Railways freight train, publishing two novels on their behalf, and touring China in 1956 on a personal invitation from Zhou Enlai. Uno died of pulmonary tuberculosis.
