= Alan Tansman =

Academic background
- Education: Columbia University (BA, MSJ); Yale University (PhD)

Academic work
- Discipline: Japanese culture
- Institutions: University of California, Berkeley

Alan Tansman is an American Japanologist. He is a professor of Japanese studies at the University of California, Berkeley.

== Biography ==
Tansman received his B.A. from Columbia University in East Asian Studies, M.S.J. from the Columbia University Graduate School of Journalism, M.A., M.Phil., and Ph.D. from Yale University in Japanese literature. He was the Chair of Berkeley's Department of East Asian Languages and Cultures. Tansman is considered an expert in his field of Japanese literature and culture, and has written extensively about Japanese fascism.

Tansman was a former co-chair of the editorial board of Representations, an interdisciplinary journal in the humanities published quarterly by the University of California Press. He was also a former director of Berkeley's Townsend Center for the Humanities.

In 2019, he was suspended by Berkeley for a two-year term after being accused of sexual harassment by a former student.
