= Mina's Matchbox =

2006 novel by Yōko Ogawa

- Author: Yoko Ogawa
- Original title: ミーナの行進 (Mina's March)
- Translator: Stephen B. Snyder
- Language: Japanese
- Genre: Literary fiction
- Publisher: Chuokoron Shinsha (Japanese), Pantheon Books (English)
- Publication date: 2006 (Japanese), 2024 (English)
- Publication place: Japan
- English publication date: August 13, 2024
- Pages: 348 (Chuokoron Shinsha) 288 (Pantheon Books)
- Awards: Tanizaki Prize
- ISBN: 978-0593316085
- Preceded by: 博士の愛した数式 (The Housekeeper and the Professor)
- Followed by: 寡黙な死骸みだらな弔い (Revenge: Eleven Dark Tales)

Mina's Matchbox (ミーナの行進, Mi-na no Kōshin; "Mina's March") is a novel by Yōko Ogawa. It was originally serialized in Yomiuri Shimbun in 2005 before being published as a novel in 2006 by Chuokoron-Shinsha, after which it won the 42nd Tanizaki Prize. In 2024, an English translation of the novel by Stephen B. Snyder was released.

== Synopsis ==
The novel, set in 1972, follows a twelve-year-old girl named Tomoko who leaves Okayama to stay with her aunt in Ashiya. There, she lives in a large, pristine mansion with her aunt, uncle, and great-aunt, who's German. She also meets her cousin, Mina, whom she befriends and gets closer to.

The novel briefly touches upon certain events of the time, such as Yasunari Kawabata's suicide and the Munich Olympic Massacre.

== Critical reception ==
=== Japanese ===
The novel was awarded the forty-second Tanizaki Prize. Hisashi Inoue wrote that the story felt disjointed but was nonetheless refreshing through Ogawa's depiction of life in Ashiya.

=== English ===
In a starred review, Kirkus Reviews called Ogawa's take on bildungsroman "charming" with "reflective poignancy." Also in a starred review, Publishers Weekly wrote that "Ogawa pulls off the rare feat of making childhood memories both credible and provocative. Readers will be hypnotized."

The New York Times wrote that the novel continued, in "effervescent prose", Ogawa's enduring interest in memory manifested also in her previously translated novels, The Memory Police and The Housekeeper and the Professor. The Asian Review of Books found it a "truly beautiful coming-of-age novel written from a mature adult's perspective." Similarly, The New Yorker called it a "beguiling coming-of-age". World Literature Today noted its "precious, tender prose".

The Star Tribune lauded Snyder's sensitivity in translation, particularly in the scene where the characters of Tomoko's name are explicated to her grand-aunt. The Financial Times noted that "In Stephen Snyder's elegant translation, the tone is whimsical but never syrupy."

Several publications, like Time Magazine, placed the novel on their lists of must-reads and best books. The New York Times included it on their weekly Editor's Choice.
