= Hiromi Kawakami =

Japanese writer

- 川上 弘美
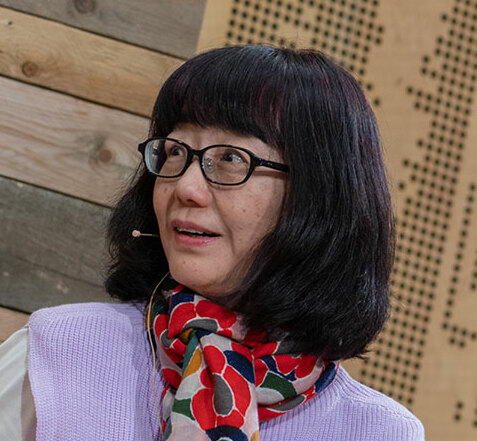
- Kawakami in 2023
- Born: 1 April 1958 (age 68); Tokyo, Japan
- Education: Ochanomizu Women's College
- Occupation: Novelist
- Writing career
- Period: 1990–present
- Genres: Fiction, poetry
- Notable works: Tread on a Snake, The Briefcase/Strange Weather in Tokyo
- Notable awards: Akutagawa Prize; Tanizaki Prize; Yomiuri Prize; Izumi Kyōka Prize for Literature; MEXT Art Encouragement Prize

Hiromi Kawakami (川上 弘美, Kawakami Hiromi; born April 1958) is a Japanese writer, known for her off-beat fiction, poetry, and literary criticism. She has won numerous Japanese literary awards, including the Akutagawa Prize, the Tanizaki Prize, the Yomiuri Prize, and the Izumi Kyōka Prize for Literature. Her work has been adapted for film and has been translated into more than 15 languages.

== Early life and education ==
Kawakami was born in 1958 in Tokyo. She grew up in the Takaido neighborhood of Suginami City in Tokyo Prefecture, Kanto Region. She graduated from Ochanomizu Women's College in 1980.

== Career ==
After graduating from college Kawakami began writing and editing for NW-SF, a Japanese science fiction magazine. Her first short story, "Sho-shimoku" ("Diptera"), appeared in NW-SF in 1980. She also taught science in a middle school and high school, but became a housewife when her husband had to relocate for work.

In 1994, at the age of 36, Kawakami debuted as a writer of literary fiction with a collection of short stories entitled Kamisama (God). In 1996 Hebi wo fumi (Tread on a Snake) won the Akutagawa Prize, one of Japan's most prestigious literary awards. It was later translated into English under the title Record of a Night Too Brief. She received the Tanizaki Prize in 2001 for her novel Sensei no kaban (The Briefcase or Strange Weather in Tokyo), a love story about a friendship and romance between a woman in her thirties and her former teacher, a man in his seventies. After the Fukushima Daiichi nuclear disaster, Kawakami rewrote her debut short story "Kamisama" ("God"), keeping the original plot but incorporating the events of Fukushima into the story.

In 2014 the film Nishino Yukihiko no Koi to Bōken, based on Kawakami's 2003 novel of the same name and starring Yutaka Takenouchi and Machiko Ono, was released nationwide in Japan. That same year Kawakami's novel Suisei (水声) was published by Bungeishunjū. Suisei won the 66th Yomiuri Prize in 2015, with selection committee member Yōko Ogawa praising the book for expanding the horizon of literature. In 2016 Kawakami's book Ōkina tori ni sarawarenai yō (大きな鳥にさらわれないよう), a collection of 14 short stories published by Kodansha, won the 44th Izumi Kyōka Prize for Literature. In 2025, Under the Eye of the Big Bird, Asa Yoneda's English translation of this collection, was shortlisted for the International Booker Prize.

== Writing style ==
Kawakami's work explores emotional ambiguity by describing the intimate details of everyday social interactions. Many of her stories incorporate elements of fantasy and magical realism. Her writing has drawn comparisons to Lewis Carroll and Banana Yoshimoto, and she has cited Gabriel García Márquez and J. G. Ballard as influences. Many of her short stories, novel extracts, and essays have been translated into English, including "God Bless You" ("Kamisama"), "The Moon and the Batteries" (extract from Sensei no kaban), "Mogera Wogura", "Blue Moon", "The Ten Loves of Nishino", and "People in My Neighborhood."

== Awards and honors ==
- 1996 Akutagawa Prize for 蛇を踏む - Hebi wo fumu (A Snake Stepped On)
- 1999 Murasaki Shikibu Prize for 神様 - Kamisama (God's Bear)
- 2000 Itō Sei Literature Prize and Woman Writer's Prize for 溺レる - Oboreru (Drowning)
- 2001 Tanizaki Prize for センセイの鞄 - Sensei no kaban (The Briefcase / Strange Weather in Tokyo)
- 2007 57th MEXT Minister's Award for Literature
- 2012 Man Asian Literary Prize shortlist for センセイの鞄 - Sensei no kaban (The Briefcase / Strange Weather in Tokyo)
- 2014 Independent Foreign Fiction Prize shortlist for センセイの鞄 - Sensei no kaban (The Briefcase / Strange Weather in Tokyo)
- 2015 66th Yomiuri Prize for 水声 - Suisei
- 2016 44th Izumi Kyōka Prize for Literature for 大きな鳥にさらわれないよう - Ōkina tori sarawarenai yō (Under the Eye of the Big Bird)
- 2019 Medal with Purple Ribbon
- 2025 International Booker Prize shortlist for 大きな鳥にさらわれないよう - Ōkina tori sarawarenai yō (Under the Eye of the Big Bird)

== Film adaptation ==
- 2014 Nishino Yukihiko no Koi to Bōken

== Selected works ==
| Original publication | | English publication | |
| Title | Year | Title | Year |
|---|---|---|---|
| 神様; Kamisama | 1994 | Partial translation included in Read Real Japanese Fiction, trans. Michael Emmerich, Kodansha, ISBN 9784770030580 | 2008 |
| 蛇を踏む; Hebi wo fumu | 1996 | Record of a Night Too Brief, trans. Lucy North, Pushkin Press, ISBN 9781782272717 | 2017 |
| 溺れる; Oboreru | 2000 | N/A | N/A |
| センセイの鞄; Sensei no kaban | 2001 | The Briefcase, trans. Allison Markin Powell, Counterpoint, ISBN 9781582435992; Strange Weather in Tokyo, trans. Allison Markin Powell, Counterpoint, ISBN 9781640090163 | 2012; 2017 |
| パレード; Parēdo | 2002 | Parade: A Folktale, trans. Allison Markin Powell, Soft Skull Press, ISBN 9781593765804 | 2019 |
| 龍宮; Ryūgū | 2002 | Dragon Palace, trans. Ted Goossen, Stone Bride Press, ISBN 9781737625377 | 2023 |
| ニシノユキヒコの恋と冒険; Nishino Yukihiko no koi to bōken | 2003 | The Ten Loves of Nishino, trans. Allison Markin Powell, Europa Editions, ISBN 9781609455330 | 2019 |
| 古道具 中野商店; Furudōgu Nakano shōten | 2005 | The Nakano Thrift Shop, trans. Allison Markin Powell, Europa Editions, ISBN 9781609453992 | 2016 |
| 真鶴; Manazuru | 2006 | Manazuru trans. Michael Emmerich, Counterpoint, ISBN 9781582436272 | 2010 |
| どこから行っても遠い町; Doko kara itte mo tōi machi | 2008 | Far From Everywhere, trans. Allison Markin Powell, Granta Books, ISBN 9781803512679, Algonquin Books, ISBN 9781643758107 | 2027 |
| パスタマシーンの幽霊; Pasutamashīn no yūrei | 2010 | N/A | N/A |
| 水声; Suisei | 2014 | N/A | N/A |
| 大きな鳥にさらわれないよう; Ōkina tori ni sarawarenai yō | 2016 | Under the Eye of the Big Bird, trans. Asa Yoneda, Soft Skull Press, ISBN 9781593766115 | 2024 |
| このあたりの人たち; Kono atari no hitotachi | 2016 | People From My Neighborhood, trans. Ted Goossen, Soft Skull Press (publisher), ISBN 9781593767112 | 2021 |
| 三度目の恋; Sandome no koi | 2020 | The Third Love, trans. Ted Goossen, Granta Books, ISBN 9781783788873 | 2024 |
