= Tsujihara =

Tsujihara (written: 辻原) is a Japanese surname. Notable people with the surname include:

- Kevin Tsujihara (born 1964), American businessman
- Noboru Tsujihara (辻原 登, born 1945), Japanese novelist
