= Taku Miki =

Japanese poet and novelist (1935–2023)

Tomita Miki (三木 卓, Miki Taku; May 13, 1935 – November 18, 2023), known by his pen name Taku Miki, was a Japanese poet and novelist during the Showa and Heisei era.

== Biography ==
Miki was born in Tokyo, and grew up in Manchukuo. He returned to Japan in 1946 and graduated in 1959 from Waseda University where he majored in Russian literature. During college he wrote poems and reviews for literary magazine Bungaku soshiki, and after graduation formed part of the poetry circle around Han ("Inundation").

Miki's principal works include the poetry collection Tokyo gozen sanji (3 AM in Tokyo, 1966), the fairy tale Horobita kuni no tabi ("Travels in a Ruined Country", 1969); and Hogeki no ato de ("After the Bombardment", 1973), which contains the Akutagawa Prize-winning story Hiwa ("Finch").

His novels include Furueru shita ("With Quivering Tongue", 1974), Karera ga hashirinuketa hi ("The Day They Went the Distance", 1978), Gyosha no aki ("The Charioteer in Autumn", 1985), and Koguma-za no otoko ("The Man from the Little Dipper", 1989). He has also written literary criticism (Kotoba no suru shigoto, "The Work Words Do", 1975), essays (Tokyo bishiteki hokō, "Microscopic Strolls Through Tokyo", 1975), and a work of juvenile fiction, (Potapota, "Drip, Drip", 1984).

The poem "Genealogy," translated from the Japanese by Whang Insu, appears in the text One World of Literature (1993) by Shirley Geok-lin Lim and Norman A. Spencer.

In 2007, he was selected as a member of the Japan Art Academy.

Miki died on November 18, 2023, at the age of 88.

== Major prizes ==
- 1967 H-Shi Prize, for Tokyo gozen sanji
- 1970 Takami Jun Prize, for Waga kidi rando (Our kiddy land)
- 1973 Akutagawa Prize, for Hiwa (Finch)
- 1984 Noma Jido Bungei Prize (Noma Juvenile Literary Prize), for Potapota (Drip drip)
- 1986 Hirabayashi Taiko Prize, for Gyosha no aki (Autumn of the driver)
- 1997 Tanizaki Prize for Roji
- Geijutsu Sensho Monbu Daijin Prize
