= Takehiro Irokawa =

Japanese writer

Takehiro Irokawa (色川 武大, Irokawa Takehiro; March 28, 1929 – April 10, 1989) was a noted Japanese writer who published both serious literature and light fiction under a variety of pseudonyms including Asada Tetsuya (阿佐田哲也) and Budai Irokawa (色川武大). Many of his works were autobiographical in nature and concerned his life as a mahjong gambler.

== Biography ==
Irokawa was born in Shinjuku, Tokyo. His father was a retired navy captain who remained at home on a military pension, and with whom Irokawa had troubled relations. Irokawa began skipping school from an early age to see movies and vaudeville in the Asakusa entertainment district. In 1943 he was drafted to work in the factory labor mobilization, and at the end of the war, was expelled from school when it was discovered that he had been editing a mimeographed magazine deemed rebellious. As his father's pension lapsed, he took to small-time criminal activities and gambling, particularly mahjong.

In the early 1950s Irokawa began writing under pseudonyms. He first received literary recognition in 1961 for a short story, winning the Chuokoron Newcomers Prize and praise from Yukio Mishima and Taijun Takeda. He continued to publish copiously through the 1970s. Over the years, Irokawa won the 79th Naoki Prize (1978上), the 9th Kawabata Yasunari Literature Prize (1982), and the 40th Yomiuri Prize (1988) for Kyōjin nikki. He was briefly hospitalized in 1968 for visual and auditory hallucinations, perhaps related to narcolepsy; he died of a heart attack in 1989 at the age of 60. He was buried in Tokyo and enshrined at a temple in Kyoto where the New Japan Mahjong Federation holds a festival every year in his honor.

== Adaptations ==
In 1984 Makoto Wada directed a film adaptation of Irokawa's most famous novel, Mahjong Drifters Chronicles (麻雀放浪記) which was titled Mahjong hōrōki.

A video game adaptation named Mahjong Mahjong Wanderers Story CLASSIC was developed by Alpha Unit and published by Imagineer (Japanese company) on August 1, 1997, for the Nintendo 64.

The manga and anime The Legend of the Gambler: Tetsuya was inspired by Irokawa's novels and includes many of his characters.

== English translations ==
- "Sparrows" (Suzume) in Tokyo stories: a literary stroll, translated by Lawrence Rogers, University of California Press, 2002. ISBN 978-0-520-21788-1.
