= Tanizaki Prize =

Japanese literary award

- 谷崎潤一郎賞 (Tanizaki Jun'ichirō Shō)
- Awarded for: Outstanding work of fiction or drama
- Country: Japan
- Presented by: Chuokoron-Shinsha
- Reward: ¥1,000,000, commemorative plaque
- First award: 1965; 61 years ago
- Website: www.chuko.co.jp/aword/tanizaki/

The Tanizaki Prize (谷崎潤一郎賞 Tanizaki Jun'ichirō Shō), named in honor of the Japanese novelist Jun'ichirō Tanizaki, is one of Japan's most sought-after literary awards. It was established in 1965 by the publishing company Chūō Kōronsha Inc. to commemorate its 80th anniversary as a publisher. It is awarded annually to a full-length representative work of fiction or drama of the highest literary merit by a professional writer. The winner receives a commemorative plaque and a cash prize of 1 million yen.

== Winners ==
Award sponsor Chuokoron-Shinsha maintains an official list of current and past winning works.

- 1965 Kojima Nobuo for Embracing Family (Hōyō kazoku, 抱擁家族)
- 1966 Endō Shūsaku for Silence (Chinmoku, 沈黙)
- 1967 Kenzaburō Ōe for The Silent Cry (Manen gannen no futtoboru, 万延元年のフットボール)
- 1967 Abe Kobo for Friends (Tomodachi, 友達)
- 1968 (no prize awarded)
- 1969 Enchi Fumiko for Shu wo ubau mono; Kizu aru tsubasa; Niji to shura (朱を奪うもの/傷ある翼/虹と修羅)
- 1970 Yutaka Haniya for Black Horse In The Midst Of Darkness (Yami no naka no kuroi uma, 闇のなかの黒い馬)
- 1970 Yoshiyuki Junnosuke for The Dark Room (Anshitsu, 暗室)
- 1971 Noma Hiroshi for Seinen no wa (青年の環)
- 1972 Maruya Saiichi for A Singular Rebellion (Tatta hitori no hanran, たった一人の反乱)
- 1973 Kaga Otohiko for Kaerazaru natsu (帰らざる夏)
- 1974 Usui Yoshimi for Azumino (安曇野)
- 1975 Minakami Tsutomu for Ikkyū (一休)
- 1976 Fujieda Shizuo for Denshin ugaku (田紳有楽)
- 1977 Shimao Toshio for Hi no utsuroi (日の移ろい)
- 1978 Nakamura Shin'ichirō for Summer (Natsu, 夏)
- 1979 Tanaka Komimasa for Poroporo (ポロポロ)
- 1980 Kono Taeko for Ichinen no banka (一年の牧歌)
- 1981 Fukazawa Shichiro for Michinoku no ningyotachi (みちのくの人形たち)
- 1981 Goto Akio for Yoshinotayū (吉野太夫)
- 1982 Oba Minako for Katachi mo naku (寂兮寥兮)
- 1983 Furui Yoshikichi for Morning Glory (Asagao, 槿)
- 1984 Kuroi Senji for Life in the Cul-de-Sac (Gunsei, 群棲)
- 1984 Takai Yuichi for This Country's Sky (Kono kuni no sora, この国の空)
- 1985 Haruki Murakami for Hard-Boiled Wonderland and the End of the World (Sekai no owari to Hādoboirudo Wandārando, 世界の終わりとハードボイルド・ワンダーランド)
- 1986 Hino Keizo for Sakyu ga ugoku yō ni (砂丘が動くように)
- 1987 Tsutsui Yasutaka for Yumenokizaka bunkiten (夢の木坂分岐点)
- 1988 (no prize awarded)
- 1989 (no prize awarded)
- 1990 Hayashi Kyoko for Yasurakani ima wa nemuri tamae (やすらかに今はねむり給え)
- 1991 Inoue Hisashi for Shanghai Moon (Shanhai Mūn, シャンハイムーン)
- 1992 Setouchi Jakucho for Hana ni toe (花に問え)
- 1993 Ikezawa Natsuki for The Navidad Incident: The Downfall of Matías Guili (Mashiasu giri no shikkyaku, マシアス・ギリの失脚)
- 1994 Tsujii Takashi for Rainbow Cove (Niji no misaki, 虹の岬)
- 1995 Tsuji Kunio for Saigyō kaden (西行花伝)
- 1996 (no prize awarded)
- 1997 Hosaka Kazushi for Kisetsu no kioku (季節の記憶)
- 1997 Miki Taku for Roji (路地)
- 1998 Tsushima Yūko for Mountain of Fire: Account of a Wild Monkey (Hi no yama - yamazaruki, 火の山―山猿記)
- 1999 Takagi Nobuko for Translucent Tree (Tokō no ki, (透光の樹)
- 2000 Tsujihara Noboru for Yudotei Maruki (遊動亭円木)
- 2000 Murakami Ryū for A Symbiotic Parasite (Kyoseichu, 共生虫)
- 2001 Hiromi Kawakami for The Briefcase/Strange Weather in Tokyo (Sensei no kaban, センセイの鞄)
- 2002: (no prize awarded)
- 2003: Tawada Yoko for Suspect On The Night Train (Yōgisha no yakōressha, 容疑者の夜行列車)
- 2004: Horie Toshiyuki for Yukinuma and Its Environs (Yukinuma to sono shūhen, 雪沼とその周辺)
- 2005: Machida Kō for Confession (Kokuhaku, 告白)
- 2005: Amy Yamada for Wonderful Flavor (Fūmizekka, 風味絶佳)
- 2006: Yōko Ogawa for Mina's March (Mīna no Kōshin, ミーナの行進)
- 2007: Seirai Yuichi for Bakushin (爆心)
- 2008: Natsuo Kirino for Tokyo-jima (東京島)
- 2009: (no prize awarded)
- 2010: Kazushige Abe for Pistils (Pisutoruzu, ピストルズ)
- 2011: Mayumi Inaba for To the Peninsula (半島へ)
- 2012: Genichiro Takahashi for Goodbye, Christopher Robin (さよならクリストファー・ロビン)
- 2013: Mieko Kawakami for Dreams of Love (Ai no Yume to ka, 愛の夢とか)
- 2014: Hikaru Okuizumi for The Autobiography of Tokyo (Tōkyō jijoden, 東京自叙伝)
- 2015: Kaori Ekuni for Geckos, Frogs, and Butterflies (Yamori Kaeru Shijimichō, ヤモリ、カエル、シジミチョウ)
- 2016: Akiko Itoyama for Hakujyō (薄情)
- 2016: Yū Nagashima for San no Tonari wa Gogōshitsu (三の隣は五号室)
- 2017: Hisaki Matsuura for honour and trance (Meiyo to Kōkotsu, 名誉と恍惚)
- 2018: Tomoyuki Hoshino for Honō (焰)
- 2019: Kiyoko Murata for Hizoku (飛族)
- 2020: Kenichiro Isozaki for Nihon Momai Zenshi (日本蒙昧前史)
- 2021: Kanehara Hitomi for Unsocial Distance (Ansōsharudisutansu, アンソーシャルディスタンス)
- 2022: Banana Yoshimoto for Miton to fubin (ミトンとふびん)
- 2023: Kikuko Tsumura for Suishagoya no Nene (水車小屋のネネ)
- 2024: Tomoka Shibasaki for Tsuzuki to hajimari (続きと始まり)
- 2025: Kumi Kimura for Kuma wa doko ni iru no (熊はどこにいるの)

== See also ==
- List of Japanese literary awards
