= Saiichi Maruya =

Japanese writer (1925–2012)

- 丸谷才一
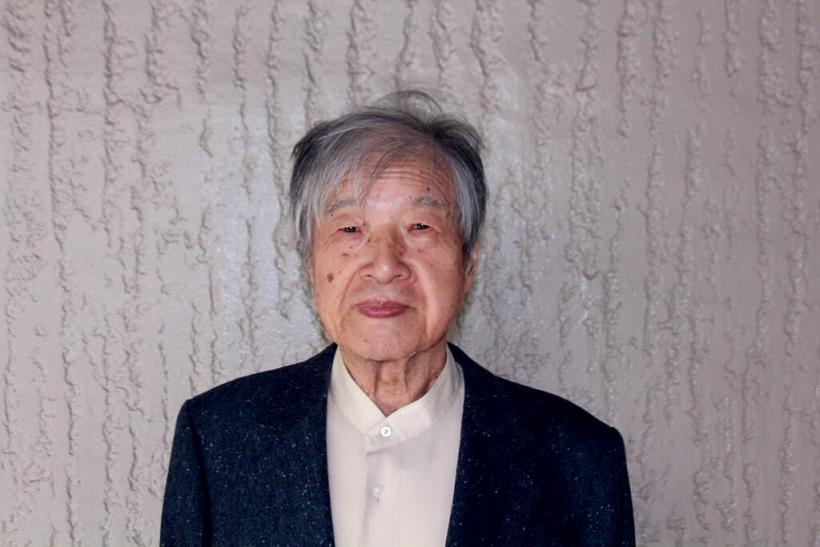
- Saiichi Maruya in 2011
- Born: Saiichi Nemura (根村才一); August 27, 1925
- Died: October 13, 2012 (aged 87)
- Education: University of Tokyo
- Occupations: Writer, translator, critic
- Writing career
- Language: Japanese
- Genre: Fiction
- Notable works: Toshi no nokori; Tatta hitori no hanran
- Notable awards: Akutagawa Prize; Tanizaki Prize; Kawabata Prize; Noma Literary Prize; Order of Culture

Saiichi Maruya (丸谷 才一, Maruya Saiichi; August 27, 1925 – October 13, 2012) was a Japanese author and literary critic.

== Biography ==
Maruya, whose real name was Saiichi Nemura, was born in Tsuruoka city, Yamagata Prefecture on August 27, 1925. His father was a doctor, and apparently wealthy enough to have a big personal library, which whetted Maruya's literary appetite.

Maruya was mobilized into the Japanese Army in March 1945 when still a high school student, but did not see battlefield action as Japan surrendered shortly thereafter. Following the war's end, he completed his high school studies in Niigata, then in 1947 entered the University of Tokyo to major in English literature, although he also studied classical Japanese literature. To develop his own writing style he began translating English works. He translated Joyce's Ulysses in collaboration with Takamatsu Yūichi and Nagai Reiji (1964) and A Portrait of the Artist as a Young Man in 1969. James Joyce's works became a major influence on his writing. After completing his degree, he taught English literature at Kokugakuin University and then at the University of Tokyo. During this time, he wrote several novels, including Ehoba no kao o sakete (エホバ の 顔 を さけて, 1958), Kanata e (彼方 へ, 1962), and Sasamakura (笹まくら, Grass for My Pillow, 1966).

Maruya was also an influential literary critic, publishing reviews in the magazine Shukan Asahi and in the Mainichi Shimbun. Maruya said that improving the quality of book reviews in Japan was one of the things he was most proud of. His criticism and essays include Go-Toba In (後鳥羽 院, The Retired Emperor Go-Toba, 1973), Nihon bungakushi hayawakari (日本文学史 早わかり, A Quick Guide to the History of Japanese Literature, 1976), Asobi jikan (遊び 時間, Play Time, 1976) and Chūshingura to wa nani ka (忠臣蔵 と は 何 か, What is the Chūshingura?, 1984).

Maruya died of heart failure on October 13, 2012.

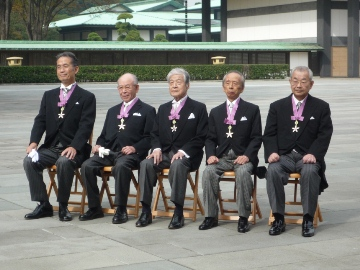
Maruya received the Order of Culture. After that, they posed for the photo. (at the East Garden of the Tokyo Imperial Palace on November 3, 2011)

== Awards ==
In 1968 Maruya won the Akutagawa Prize for Toshi no nokori (年 の 残り, The Rest of the Year). In 1972 he published Tatta hitori no hanran (たった ひとり の 反乱, Singular Rebellion), for which he won the Tanizaki Prize. He also received the Kawabata Prize, the Kikuchi Kan Prize for Cultural Merit and the Noma Literary Prize (1985), and the Order of Culture, awarded in 2011 by the Emperor of Japan.

== Selected works in translation ==
- Singular Rebellion. trans. Dennis Keene. Kodansha America. 1986. ISBN 978-0870117633.
- Rain in the Wind: Four Stories. trans. Dennis Keene. Kodansha America. 1990. ISBN 978-0870119408.
- A Mature Woman. trans. Dennis Keene. Kodansha International. 1995. ISBN 978-4770018649.
- Grass for My Pillow. trans. Dennis Keene. Columbia University Press. 2002. ISBN 978-0231126588.
