= The Diving Pool =

Novella collection by Yōko Ogawa

- Author: Yōko Ogawa
- Original title: Daibingu pūru (ダイヴィング・プール); Ninshin karendā (妊娠カレンダー); Domitorii (ドミトリイ)
- Translator: Stephen Snyder
- Language: Japanese
- Genre: Psychological horror, magical realism, surrealism
- Publication date: 1990/1991
- Publication place: Japan
- English publication date: 2008
- Pages: 164
- ISBN: 9780099521358
- Dewey Decimal: 895.635

The Diving Pool: Three Novellas is a novella collection by Japanese author Yōko Ogawa, first published in English in 2008. It was Ogawa's first book-length work to be translated.

The Diving Pool is a triptych of psychological horror stories with a loosely connected theme about Japanese femininity, loneliness, and societal alienation. All three novellas have young female protagonists, a schoolgirl in "The Diving Pool" and young adult women in "Pregnancy Diary" and "Dormitory", who feel isolated and alienated by Japanese society and lash out at their surroundings. The novellas focus on the domestic world, reinterpreting it as a prison for its characters which they try gainlessly to escape; the protagonists are at times uncaring, schizoid, or monstrous in their behaviour towards themselves and the world around them.

The Diving Pool received a positive reception in translation, becoming an object of critical praise and academic study. In the original Japanese, the novellas had been published in separate collections up to a year apart, where they were each individually well received.

== Plot ==
"The Diving Pool", "Pregnancy Diary", and "Dormitory" have similar but unrelated plots.

=== The Diving Pool ===
The protagonist of "The Diving Pool" is Aya, a schoolgirl in her early teens. Aya's parents run a Christian orphanage at which she is "the only child who is not an orphan, a fact that has disfigured my family"; she develops an infatuation with Jun, one of the orphans, a kind-hearted, talented diver. Aya obsessively watches Jun practice, sneaking into the orphanage's pool room to watch without him noticing.

As her infatuation builds, Aya also develops a sadistic obsession with Rie, the youngest resident of the orphanage. Rie's suffering and trauma enrapture Aya and encourage her to torment the child until she eventually traps her in an urn, in an emotionally and sexually charged sequence. The sadistic thoughts then culminate in her feeding Rie a rotten cream puff, whereby Rie becomes extremely ill and almost dies. Jun eventually discovers Aya's sadism, revealing his knowledge of it to her after a diving session and destroying her dreams of a relationship.

=== Pregnancy Diary ===
The unnamed narrator of "Pregnancy Diary" is a young woman who lives with her sister, newly pregnant, and her sister's husband. "Pregnancy Diary" is told in an epistolary format, with the narrator keeping a meticulous journal of her sister's pregnancy and reactions to it. The narrator's sister grows obsessed with scents and food, particularly sweet food, and entrusts the narrator to cook for her to sate her cravings.

The narrator of "Pregnancy Diary" is unemotional, with little reaction to or concern for her sister, while the sister is portrayed in the diary as "nervous and hysterical", dependent on a psychiatrist who makes regular house visits. As the sister's pregnancy grows, she first becomes repulsed by food and later obsessed with it; the narrator remarks on her sister's pronounced weight gain late in the pregnancy, noting the disapproval of her doctors. The narrator purchases ingredients to make a homemade jam for her sister, specifically grapefruits imported from America, which she is warned are treated with a pesticide that "destroys the chromosomes" of growing fetuses. As she makes batches of the jam, the tether of the sisters to reality weakens, and it becomes unclear what is real and what is delusion in their folie à deux.

=== Dormitory ===
The also-unnamed narrator of "Dormitory" is isolated in Tokyo; her husband is working overseas in Sweden, and while she quit her job, she hasn't yet travelled to join him. Her younger cousin is starting university, and she assists him to stay in the same dormitory hall she herself lived in as a student. She strikes up a friendship with the manager, a triple amputee who nonetheless lives independently and can perform complex manual tasks such as sewing buttons with his only remaining limb. Not long after moving in, the narrator's cousin disappears; however, she is uninterested in trying to find him.

"Dormitory" is the most surreal novella in the collection, being told primarily on the metaphorical rather than the literal level. Few of the questions it raises are answered, and the ending is symbolic rather than literal.

== Themes ==
The Diving Pool is a psychological horror collection with subversive and metaphorical themes. The novellas are dream-like, using loosely connected imagery to evoke feelings and questions without providing answers. The collection relates to a subverted form of femininity and domesticity, with Ogawa's work as a whole being described as about "the horrific femininities of daily life".

A recurring theme of the collection is food, particularly the subversion of feeding other people from an act of caring into one of sadistically undermining the other's wellbeing. In "The Diving Pool", one of the ways Aya torments Rie is to feed her spoiled and rotten food, hoping to sicken the girl under the guise of rewarding her; in "Pregnancy Diary", the focus of the story is the narrator's subverted caregiving for her pregnant sister, feeding her food made with tainted ingredients with the hopes of disfiguring her child. Grace En-Yi Ting, assistant professor of gender and literature at the University of Hong Kong, analyzes this as an element of Ogawa's broader body of literature, where femininity and caregiving being subverted by sadism and schizoid detachment is a wide-ranging theme. Ting understands Ogawa's work as a reflection of Japanese society more broadly, where traditional gender roles and modern capitalist workforce norms combine into unreachable expectations. Furuya Takanori concurs with Ting, describing "Pregnancy Diary" in its original Japanese publication as "妊娠カレンダー (Ninshin karendā)" as part of a greater body of work by Japanese female authors on the human body as an object of discomfort.

The protagonists of each story in The Diving Pool are in different landmark developmental stages; "The Diving Pool" relates to first love, "Pregnancy Diary" to pregnancy, and "Dormitory" to married life. The coming-of-age concept is subverted, as in each case the characters fail to attain developmental milestones and recuse themselves from society. The obstacles between the protagonists and their passions are insurmountable, and their ability to enter mainstream society hampered.

The prose style of The Diving Pool is detailed and intricate regarding locations and inanimate objects, but sparse as to people, furthering the sense of detachment. Despite being told from a first-person perspective, the narration in each story is opaque and reveals little about the thoughts and feelings of the narrators; however, the settings around them are described in detail, with vivid descriptions given of places such as shopping strips and maternity clinics.

== Reception ==
The Diving Pool received a positive reception upon translation. Writing for The Guardian, Joanna Briscoe described Ogawa as a "conspicuously gifted" writer who needed to be discovered in the Anglosphere. Publishers Weekly described The Diving Pool as "crafty" and "suspenseful" with a "gnawing, erotic edge", while Kirkus Reviews praised it as "a masterfully twisted triptych" that demonstrated the power of short fiction. Victoria James for The Independent called it a "welcome introduction" to Ogawa's work, though criticized the stories for having overly similar structures and premises.

In the original Japanese publication, "Pregnancy Diary" and "Dormitory" won the Akutagawa Prize, one of Japan's most prestigious and sought-after literary prizes. The works were praised for their sense of aesthetics. "The Diving Pool", which was originally published in a separate collection from the other two novellas, was shortlisted for the Akutagawa Prize. In translation, The Diving Pool was awarded the 2008 Shirley Jackson Award for Best Collection and longlisted for the 2009 Independent Foreign Fiction Prize.
