= Keizo Hino =

Japanese writer

Keizo Hino (日野 啓三, Hino Keizō; June 14, 1929 – October 14, 2002) was a Japanese author.

He won the 1974 Akutagawa Prize for Ano yūhi (The Evening Sun) and the 22nd Tanizaki Prize for Sakyū ga ugoku yō ni (砂丘が動くように). Born in Tokyo, he accompanied his parents to Korea, when the country was still under Japanese colonial rule. After the war, he returned to Japan, graduating from the University of Tokyo and joining the staff of the Yomiuri Shimbun, a leading Japanese newspaper in 1952. He served as a foreign correspondent in South Korea and Vietnam before becoming a novelist.

Though he is often described as an environmentalist author, the focus of much of his fiction is the urban physical environment. Hino's works are striking for being simultaneously autobiographical and surrealistic. His novel Yume no Shima has been translated into English by Charles de Wolf as Isle of Dreams, and into German by Jaqueline Berndt and Hiroshi Yamane as Trauminsel; a short story, Bokushikan, has been translated into English by Charles de Wolf as The Rectory; another short story, Hashigo no tatsu machi 梯の立つ街, has been translated by Lawrence Rogers as "Jacob's Tokyo Ladder" and printed in 2002's Tokyo stories: a literary stroll.

== Selected works ==
- Seinaru kanata e : waga tamashii no henreki, Kyoto : PHP Kenkyūjo, 1981.
- Hōyō, Tokyo : Shueisha, 1982.
- Tenmado no aru garēji, Tokyo : Fukutake Shoten, 1982.
- Kagaku no saizensen, Tokyo : Gakuseisha, 1982.
- Seikazoku, Tokyo : Kawade Shobō Shinsha, 1983.
- Nazukerarenu mono no kishibe nite, Tokyo : Shuppan Shinsha, 1984.
- Yume no shima (夢の島), Tokyo : Kodansha, 1985. Translated as Isle of Dreams by Charles de Wolf: Dalkey Archive Press, 2010.
- Sakyū ga ugoku yōni (砂丘が動くように), Tokyo : Chūō Kōronsha, 1986.
- Sō (葬), Tōkyō : Sakuhinsha, 1987.
- Ribingu zero (リビング・ゼロ), Tokyo : Shueisha, 1987.
- Kyō mo yume miru monotachi wa (きょうも夢みる者たちは－), Tokyo : Shinchōsha, 1988.
- Doko de mo nai doko ka (どこでもないどこか), Tokyo : Fukutake Shoten, 1990.
- Dangai no toshi (断崖の年), Tokyo : Chūō Kōronsha, 1992.
- Taifū no me (台風の眼), Tokyo : Shinchōsha, 1993.
