= Tokyo Stories: A Literary Stroll =

2002 anthology of short stories

- Authors: Translated and edited by Lawrence Rogers
- Cover artist: Frances Baca
- Language: English
- Published: 2002 (University of California Press)
- Publication place: United States
- Media type: Print
- Pages: 267 pp
- ISBN: 0520-21788-8

Tokyo Stories: A Literary Stroll is an anthology of Japanese short stories set in Tokyo. The translator and editor Lawrence Rogers won the Japan–U.S. Friendship Commission Prize for the Translation of Japanese Literature from the Donald Keene Center of Japanese culture in 2004 for his work on this book. The stories are ordered by the areas of Tokyo in which they take place.

== Contents ==
=== Central Tokyo ===
- "Mire" by Motojirō Kajii
- "Terrifying Tokyo" by Kyūsaku Yumeno
- "The Image" by Rintaro Takeda
- "Fountains in the Rain" by Yukio Mishima
- "Meeting Again" by Kuniko Mukōda
- "Jacob's Tokyo Ladder" by Keizo Hino

=== Shitamachi ===
- "The Death Register" by Ryūnosuke Akutagawa
- "Kid Ume, the Silver Cat" by Yasunari Kawabata
- "The First Day of the Fair" by Rintaro Takeda
- "Elegy" by Ineko Sata
- "The Old Part of Town" by Fumiko Hayashi
- "Fireworks" by Yukio Mishima
- "Azuma Bridge" by Kafū Nagai
- "An Unclaimed Body" by Michiko Ikeda

=== West of the Palace ===
- "From Behind the Study Door" by Natsume Sōseki
- "Firefly Tavern by Kazuko Saegusa
- "Swallows" by Takehiro Irokawa

=== The South End ===
- "Morning Comes Twice A Day" by Mayumi Inaba
