= Mayumi Inaba =

Japanese writer and poet (1950–2014)

- 稲葉 真弓
- Born: Mayumi Hirano 平野 眞弓; 8 March 1950; Saya, Ama, Aichi, Occupied Japan
- Died: 30 August 2014 (aged 64); Shinagawa, Tokyo, Japan
- Occupations: Novelist, poet, university professor
- Writing career
- Pen name: Yumi Kurata ( 倉田 ゆみ ) Yuko Kurata ( 倉田 悠子 )
- Period: 1973 – 2014
- Notable awards: Taiko-Hirabayashi Prize (1995); Kawabata Prize (2008); Tanizaki Prize (2011); Shinran Prize (2012); Medal of Honor, Purple ribbon (2014)

Mayumi Inaba (稲葉 真弓, Inaba Mayumi; 8 March 1950 – 30 August 2014) was a Japanese writer and poet. She won the Tanizaki Prize in 2011 for her memoir To the Peninsula (半島へ). Her short story Asa ga nido kuru (朝が二度くる, Morning Comes Twice a Day) was translated into English by Lawrence Rogers for the collection Tokyo Stories: A Literary Stroll.

== Biography ==
Inaba was born in Aichi Prefecture in 1950. Her writing career began when she was 16 and won a poetry competition sponsored by the magazine Bungei Shunjū. She soon began writing fiction and won the Prize for Young Female Authors in 1973 for her short story Aoi kage no itami wo (青い影の痛みを, The Pain of Blue Shadows). She was also awarded the Hirabayashi Taiko Prize for short story Koe no Shoufu (声の娼婦, The Voice Prostitute). Inaba published a memoir about her life with her cat, Mii no inai asa (ミーのいない朝, Mornings Without Mii), in 1999. Inaba's short story Miru (海松), named after a type of seaweed commonly known as dead man's fingers, won the 2007 Yasunari Kawabata Prize for best short story.

She died of pancreatic cancer at age 64.
