= Nishino Yukihiko no Koi to Bōken =

- Poster
- ニシノユキヒコの恋と冒険
- Directed by: Nami Iguchi
- Screenplay by: Nami Iguchi
- Based on: A novel by Hiromi Kawakami
- Starring: Yutaka Takenouchi
- Cinematography: Akihiko Suzuki
- Edited by: Nami Iguchi
- Music by: Ashiya Gary
- Distributed by: Toho
- Release date: February 8, 2014 (Japan)
- Running time: 122 minutes
- Country: Japan
- Language: Japanese

Nishino Yukihiko no Koi to Bōken (Japanese: ニシノユキヒコの恋と冒険), also known as The Tale of Nishino, is a 2014 Japanese romance film based on the novel by Hiromi Kawakami. It was directed by Nami Iguchi who also directed Hito no Sex o Warauna in 2008. The film was released on February 8, 2014.

== Cast ==
- Yutaka Takenouchi as Yukihiko Nishino
- Machiko Ono as Manami
- Riko Narumi as Subaru
- Fumino Kimura as Tama
- Tsubasa Honda as Kanoko
- Kumiko Asō as Natsumi
- Sawako Agawa as Sayuri Sasaki
