= Strange Weather in Tokyo =

2001 novel by Hiromi Kawakami

- Author: Hiromi Kawakami
- Original title: センセイの鞄 (Sensei's bag)
- Translator: Allison Markin Powell
- Language: Japanese
- Genre: Literary fiction
- Publisher: Heibonsha (Japanese) Counterpoint (English)
- Publication date: June 1, 2001 (Japan); April 10, 2012 (English, first edition); November 14, 2017 (English, second edition)
- Publication place: Japan
- Pages: 277 (Japanese); 208 (English, first edition); 192 (English, second edition)
- Awards: Tanizaki Prize
- ISBN: 978-1582435992
- Preceded by: 溺れる (Remember)
- Followed by: パレード (Parade)

Strange Weather in Tokyo (センセイの鞄, Sensei no kaban; lit. Sensei's bag) is a 2001 novel by Hiromi Kawakami, published by Heibonsha. It won the 37th Tanizaki Prize in the same year. In 2012, an English translation by Allison Markin Powell was published by Counterpoint with the title The Briefcase. In 2013, The Briefcase was shortlisted for the Man Asian Literary Prize and the Independent Foreign Fiction Prize. Later, in 2017, Counterpoint republished Powell's translation with the new title Strange Weather in Tokyo.

== Synopsis ==
Strange Weather in Tokyo follows Tsukiko Omachi, a woman in her thirties and office worker, as she stumbles upon her old high school teacher, Harutsuna Matsumoto—referred to mostly by his title, Sensei—at an izakaya. From then on, a romance ensues.

== Critical reception ==
The English translation of Strange Weather in Tokyo made it on several recommendation lists, including those published by The Guardian and NPR. The New York Times, in an article recommending 52 books for 52 places, recommended the novel for Tokyo. The Japan Society called it "an understated, poetic, gentle, profound, thoughtful, poignant, beautiful book" and lauded Powell, "who has skilfully retained the poetry and beauty of the original."

In 2013, The Briefcase was shortlisted for the Man Asian Literary Prize and the Independent Foreign Fiction Prize.

== Adaptations ==
=== Japan ===
In 2003, the novel was adapted as a television series for Wowow directed by Teruhiko Kuze. It won several awards, including the Galaxy Award.

In 2005, Kuze and screenwriter Kikumi Yamagishi adapted the novel to stage starring Kenji Sawada as Sensei and Maki Sakai as Tsukiko. Performances ran from August through September in Bunkamura, Shin-Kobe Oriental Theater, and Meitetsu Hall. Another stage adaptation, directed by Makino Nozomi with Kenji Sawada reprising his role as Sensei, was shown in 2010. It was shown in Kinokuniya Southern Theater and recast Tsukiko with Yasuko Tomita.

In 2008, NHK Radio 1 adapted the novel to a five-episode radio drama aired from October 12 to November 23, narrated by Toshiyuki Nishida and Keiko Takeshita.

From 2008 to 2009, Futabasha adapted the novel to a serialized manga, with Kawakami requesting that Jiro Taniguchi handle its illustration. The manga adaptation also included Kawakami's novella, Parade.
