= Jakucho Setouchi =

Japanese Buddhist nun and author (1922–2021)

- 瀬戸内 寂聴
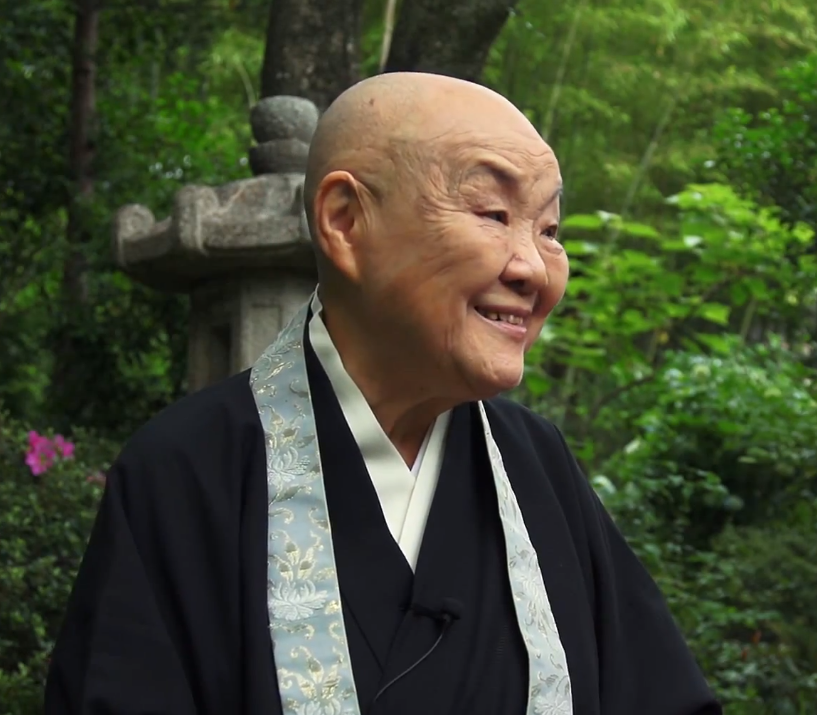
- Setouchi in 2012
- Born: Harumi Mitani; 15 May 1922; Tokushima, Japan
- Died: 9 November 2021 (aged 99); Kyoto, Japan
- Occupation: Writer
- Writing career
- Genre: Novels
- Notable works: Kashin, Natsu no Owari, Hana ni Toe, The Tale of Genji

Jakucho Setouchi (Note: Japanese: 瀬戸内 寂聴, Hepburn: Setouchi Jakuchō) (15 May 1922 – 9 November 2021; born Harumi Mitani), (Note: 三谷 晴美, Mitani Harumi) formerly known as Harumi Setouchi, (Note: 瀬戸内 晴美, Setouchi Harumi) was a Japanese Buddhist nun, writer, and activist. Setouchi wrote a best-selling translation of The Tale of Genji and over 400 fictional biographical and historical novels. In 1997, she was honoured as a Person of Cultural Merit, and in 2006, she was awarded the Order of Culture of Japan.

== Biography ==
Setouchi was born Harumi Mitani on 15 May 1922 in Tokushima, Tokushima Prefecture to Toyokichi and Koharu Mitani. Toyokichi was a cabinetmaker who made Buddhist and Shinto religious objects. In 1929, her family began using the surname Setouchi after her father was adopted by a family member.

Setouchi studied Japanese literature at Tokyo Woman's Christian University before her arranged marriage to scholar Yasushi Sakai in 1943. She moved with her husband after the Ministry of Foreign Affairs sent him to Beijing, and gave birth to their daughter in 1944. In 1945, her mother was killed in an air raid and a grandmother was also killed during the war. She returned to Japan in 1946, settled with family in Tokyo in 1947, and in 1948, left her husband and daughter for a relationship with another man.

In 1950 she divorced her husband and serialized her first novel in a magazine. She continued to have sexual relationships, including affairs with married men, and some of her novels were semi-autobiographical.

In 1957, she won her first literary award for her novel "Qu Ailing, the Female College Student". She then published Kashin ("Center of a Flower"), which was criticized for the sexual content, and to which she responded, "The critics who say such things all must be impotent and their wives frigid." Publishing her work was difficult for several years afterwards, and critics called her a "womb writer".

She began to shift her novel writing focus to historical female writers and activists, eventually including Kanoko Okamoto, Toshiko Tamura, Sugako Kanno, Fumiko Kaneko, and Itō Noe. In 1963, she was awarded The Women's Literature Prize (Joryu Bungaku Sho) for her 1962 book Natsu no Owari ("The End of Summer"), which became a best-seller. In 1968, she published the essay Ai no Rinri ("The Ethics of Love").

In 1973, Setouchi began training to become a Buddhist nun within the Tendai school of Buddhism, and received her name Jakuchō, which means "silent, lonely listening." From 1987 to 2005, she was the chief priestess at the Tendaiji temple in Iwate Prefecture. Setouchi was a pacifist and became an activist, including by participating in protests of the Persian Gulf War in 1991 and the 2003 invasion of Iraq as well as anti-nuclear rallies in Fukushima after the 2011 earthquake and tsunami, including an anti-nuclear hunger strike in 2012. She also opposed capital punishment.

She received the Tanizaki Prize for her novel Hana ni Toe ("Ask the Flowers") in 1992, and was named a Person of Cultural Merit in 1997. Her translation of The Tale of Genji from Classical Japanese took six years to complete and was published in ten volumes in 1998. She considered Prince Genji to be a plot device for the stories of the women of the court and used a contemporary version of Japanese for her translation. The novel sold more than 2.1 million volumes by mid-1999. After the book was published, she gave lectures and participated in discussion groups organized by her publisher for more than a year.

She received the Japanese Order of Culture in 2006. She also wrote under the pen name "Purple", and in 2008 revealed she had written a cell phone novel titled Tomorrow's Rainbow. In 2016, she helped found the nonprofit Little Women Project to support young women experiencing abuse, exploitation, drug addiction, or poverty. In 2017, she published her novel Inochi ("Life"), and then continued to publish her writing in literary magazines.

At the time of her death, her home temple was in the Kyoto Sagano area. Setouchi died of heart failure in Kyoto, Japan, on 9 November 2021 at the age of 99.

== Works ==
- Joshidaisei Chui Airin ("Qu Ailing, the Female College Student") (1957)
- Natsu no owari ("The End of Summer") (1962), translated by Janine Beichman ISBN 978-4-77001-746-8
- Kashin ("Center of a Flower") (1963) OCLC 51236673
- Miren ("Lingering Affections") (1963)
- Kiji ("Pheasant") (1963) translated by Robert Huey in ISBN 978-4-77002-976-8
- Hana ni toe ("Ask the Flowers") (1992)
- Beauty in Disarray (1993), translated by Sanford Goldstein and Kazuji Ninomiya ISBN 978-0-80483-322-6
- The Tale of Genji (1998)
- Basho ("Places") (2001)

== Honours and awards ==
- 1957 Shinchosha Coterie Magazine Award for Joshidaisei Chui Airin
- 1963 Women's Literature Prize (Joryu Bungaku Sho) for Natsu no Owari
- 1992 Tanizaki Prize for Hana ni Toe
- 1997 Person of Cultural Merit
- 2001 Noma Prize in literature for Basho
- 2006 Order of Culture of Japan
- 2006 International Nonino Prize
