= Under the Eye of the Big Bird =

2016 novel by Hiromi Kawakami

- 2024 book jacket
- Author: Hiromi Kawakami
- Translator: Asa Yoneda
- Subject: Fictional evolution, Biological alteration, Humanity, Survival, Extinction
- Genre: Speculative and Post-apocalyptic fiction
- Set in: Earth
- Published: 2016
- Publisher: Kodansha, Granta Publishing, Soft Skull Press
- Publication place: United Kingdom, United States
- English publication date: 2024
- Media type: Print, E-book,
- Pages: 278
- ISBN: 9781803512983 9781803512358,
- OCLC: 1467885598
- Website: Official website Soft Skull Press; Official website Granta Books

Under the Eye of the Big Bird (Japanese: 大きな鳥にさらわれないよう, romanized: Ōkina tori ni sarawarenai yō, lit. 'To Avoid Being Carried Away By Big Birds') is a 2016 speculative fiction novel set in a post-apocalyptical future depicting humanity's precarious survival spanning geologic time periods. It was written by Hiromi Kawakami in Japanese and translated into English by Asa Yoneda. The book was published by Granta Books in 2025. This book was previously released by Soft Skull Press in 2024. It was short-listed for the 2025 International Booker Prize.

== Plot ==
In a future where humanity is close to extinction and is barely hanging on through science, this novel's overarching story unfolds through a series of non-linear short interconnected pieces. In this future, Earth is populated by many unique and sparsely-connected communities, all of which employ different adaptations in order to survive.

Child-rearing is sometimes handled by constructs called "Mothers", which are considered to be separate from humans. These Mothers share one memory and consciousness and are benevolent, though many see them as boring, and some characters abuse them. While some advanced technology exists such as computers and hovercraft, important knowledge like space travel is lost. The central problem these communities face is how to preserve even a small chance for humanity's future success on the planet. Cloning plays a central role in the perpetuation of many communities, and the technology and process of this is controlled by the Mothers.

In the first chapter, "Keepsakes", a small community is composed of humans which are grown in a factory using the DNA of animals. When someone passes away, a small skull in the shape of the animal they were based on is retrieved from their corpse given to their spouse. The lifespan of these cloned humans is based upon the animal from which they were cloned.

In a later chapter, "Changes", some people have developed psychic powers, such as pyrokinesis. The narrator, Kyla, can read minds and senses her future partner Noah's sadness as the color amethyst. When Kyla reads the mind of a Mother, she is bored and disinterested.

Throughout the novel, there are a group of overseers called Watchers, which are responsible for monitoring and guiding communities. Two Watchers, Jakob and Ian, are responsible for setting up this system of small communities monitored by Watchers. Jakob and Ian have lived for thousands of years with their consciousnesses being transferred between clones. The other Watchers are also clones, raised by the Mothers, although they do not retain their memories.

Towards the end of the book, it is revealed that Mothers are a form of hybrid human, who have had their stomachs colonized by AI. From the stomach, these AI were able to influence human behavior, growth, and evolution by means of the gut microbiome. Over time, these hybrid humans began to shift in form, and are described as "Squat".

The novel concludes with the story of the supposed last two humans, who are living with a "Great Mother". Great Mothers are a rare variation of the Mothers, which are able to feel more emotion but live much shorter lives. Over the course of the lives of these two humans, one begins to discover how to clone humans, although only with the use of animal tissue and DNA. Notably, this process is distinct from cloning as the Great Mother understands it. The Great Mother monitors their progress, and is eventually impressed to see that this human has created many cloned humans, using mice as a basis, and they have begun to form their own towns and villages. The book concludes with these communities growing, and it being unclear when exactly this final story takes place.

== Critical reception ==
The novel received mostly positive reviews from critics, particularly for its imagination and creativity. The New Yorker magazine wrote that "[Kawakami's] terse, candid prose emphasizes the alienation of a world where death, sex, and clones all feel equally mechanical. At the same time, the processes by which these not-quite-humans begin to re-create religion and society feel innately familiar."

James Bradley, writing for The Guardian wrote, "[This novel] offers a powerful corrective to the assumption of human primacy, instead reminding us that we are not the endpoint in the process of evolution, but simply one link in a much longer chain."

Molly Templeton, reviewing the book for Esquire magazine, praised the imaginative premise of the stories and their depth, commenting that that Under the Eye of the Big Bird depicts imagined scenes of a world after an unexplained catastrophe. Templeton also says that the writing style is calm, even when suggesting the end of humanity. The narrative communicates a feeling of destiny within each of Kawakami's interconnected stories, and has been produced by an original imagination, with more depth revealed in subsequent readings.

Niall Harrison, writing for Locus magazine, described the novel as "accomplished", and commented that "[t]he power and the pain of the novel lies in its ability to bridge between humanity as an abstract and humanity as a characteristic, to pick out moments from a vast sweep of time and show their insignificance and their simultaneous, ultimate importance."

Hannah Beckerman of The Guardian gave a mixed review, praising Kawakami's imagination, but criticizing the narrative and lack of coherence, commenting that the book was "a somewhat disjointed and at times confusing tale". Lionel Shriver of the Financial Times gave a negative review, criticizing the tone, lack of compelling characters, the lack of narrative and forward momentum, and the lack of world development.
