= Manazuru (novel) =

2006 novel by Hiromi Kawakami

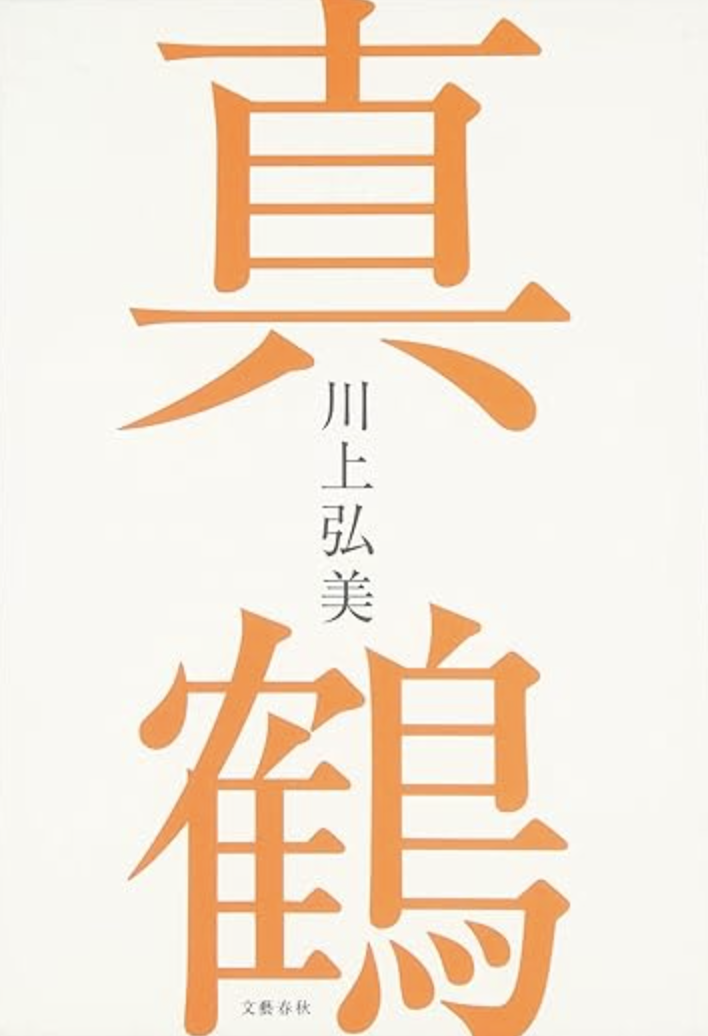
- Author: Hiromi Kawakami
- Translator: Michael Emmerich
- Language: Japanese
- Genre: Literary fiction
- Publisher: Bungeishunjū (Japan) Counterpoint (English)
- Publication date: October 30, 2006 (Japanese) September 1, 2010 (English)
- Publication place: Japan
- Pages: 266 (Japanese); 224 (English)
- Award: Minister of Education, Culture, Sports, Science and Technology Prize
- ISBN: 978-4163248608
- Preceded by: 古道具 中野商店 (The Nakano Thrift Shop)
- Followed by: パスタマシーンの幽霊 (Pasta Machine Ghost)

Manazuru (真鶴) is a 2006 novel by Hiromi Kawakami, published by Bungeishunjū. In Japan, it won the Minister of Education, Culture, Sports, Science and Technology Prize. Later, in 2010, an English translation by Michael Emmerich was published by Counterpoint, marking Kawakami's first English novel translation.

== Synopsis ==
The book follows Kei, a widow whose husband, Rei, disappeared 12 years ago, leaving her behind with a daughter, Momo. Together, Kei, Momo, and Kei's mother live in Tokyo. Periodically, for years, Kei visits Manazuru, a place which makes her ambiguously reminisce about her past—memories of which she is unsure.

== Critical reception ==
=== Japanese ===
The Asahi Shimbun's book column noted its atmosphere of darkness, eeriness, and primordial feeling. Many readers lauded the book's emotional sensibilities, relationships, and sense of location at Manazuru's seaside.

=== English ===
Kirkus Reviews, calling it a "dreamlike novel", wrote that the book was an "Evocative, original exploration of grief—more of a journey than a destination, with plot almost beside the point." Publishers Weekly said "Kawakami has a remarkable ability to obscure reality, fantasy, and memory, making the desire for love feel hauntingly real."

Three Percent, an international literature site at the University of Rochester, stated Emmerich "did an amazing job translating this, capturing the oddness of the prose and punctuation in a way that's poetic, dreamlike, and fun to read."
