= Noboru Tsujihara =

Japanese writer

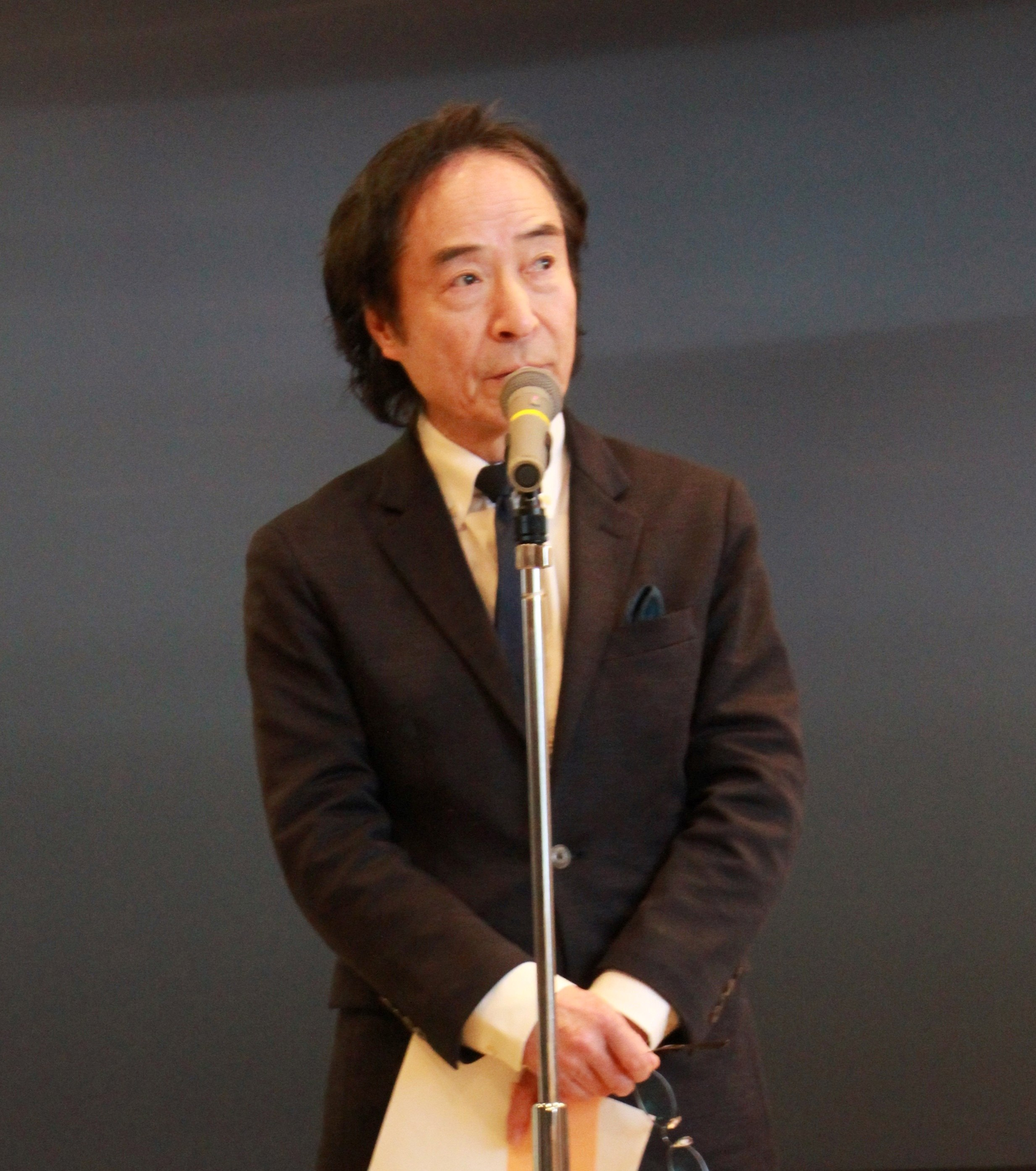
Noboru Tsujihara

Noboru Tsujihara (辻原 登, Tsujihara Noboru; born 1945) is a prize-winning Japanese novelist.

== Early life ==
Tsujihara was born in 1945.

== Prizes and honours ==
- 1990 Akutagawa Prize for Mura no namae (村の名前, A Village's Name)
- 1999 Yomiuri Prize for Tobe kirin (Fly, Kirin!)
- 2000 Tanizaki Prize for Yudotei Enboku (遊動亭円木)
- 2005 Kawabata Yasunari Prize for Kareha no naka no aoi honoo (枯葉の中の青い炎, Blue Flames Among the Dry Leaves)
- 2012 Medal with Purple Ribbon
- 2022 Person of Cultural Merit
- 2024 Order of the Rising Sun, 3rd Class, Gold Rays with Neck Ribbon

== Selected works ==
- Manon no nikutai (マノンの肉体), Tōkyō : Bungei Shunjū, 1990.
- Mura no namae (村の名前), Tōkyō : Bungei Shunjū, 1990. ISBN 4-16-312050-5.
- Yuri no kokoro (百合の心), Tōkyō : Kōdansha, 1990.
- Shinrinsho (森林書), Tōkyō : Bungei Shunjū, 1994. ISBN 4-16-314460-9.
- Kazoku shashin : tanpenshū (家族 写真 : 短編集), Tōkyō : Bungei Shunjū, 1995. ISBN 4-16-315390-X.
- Dare no mono demo nai kanashimi (だれのものでもない悲しみ), Tōkyō : Chūō Kōronsha, 1995.
- Sōgyōsha wa nanadaime : Jasuko kaichō, Okada Takuya no ikikata (創業者は七代目 : ジャスコ会長, 岡田卓也の生き方), Tōkyō : Mainichi Shinbunsha, 1995.
- Yūdō Teienboku (遊動亭円木), Bungei Shunjū, 1999.
- Hatsunetsu (初熱), Tōkyō : Nihon Keizai Shinbunsha, 2001.
- Yakusoku yo (約束よ), Tōkyō : Shinchōsha, 2002.
- Jasumin (ジャスミン), Tōkyō : Bungei Shunjū, 2004.
- Yūdōtei Enboku (遊動亭円木), Tōkyō : Bungei Shunjū, 2004.
- Kareha no naka no aoi honoo (枯葉の中の青い炎), Tōkyō : Shinchōsha, 2005.
