= The Memory Police =

1994 novel by Yōko Ogawa

- First edition cover (Kodansha, 1994)
- Author: Yōko Ogawa
- Audio read by: Traci Kato-Kiriyama
- Original title: 密やかな結晶 (Hisoyaka na Kesshō)
- Translator: Stephen Snyder
- Cover artist: Michiaki Mochizuki
- Language: Japanese
- Genre: Science fiction, Dystopian fiction
- Publisher: Kodansha
- Publication date: 26 January 1994
- Publication place: Japan
- English publication date: 13 August 2019 (Pantheon)
- Media type: Print (Hardcover and Paperback)
- Pages: 411 (Kodansha); 288 (Pantheon)
- ISBN: 978-4-06-205843-8
- Dewey Decimal: 895.63/5
- LC Class: PL858.G37 H5713 2019

The Memory Police (Japanese: 密やかな結晶, Hepburn: Hisoyaka na Kesshō; "Secret Crystallization" or "Quiet Crystallization") is a 1994 science fiction dystopian novel by Yōko Ogawa. The novel, dream-like and melancholy in tone in a manner influenced by modernist writer Franz Kafka, takes place on an island with a setting reminiscent of that in George Orwell's Nineteen Eighty-Four. An English translation by Stephen Snyder was published by Pantheon Books and Harvill Secker in 2019. A film adaptation was announced in October 2020, with Lily Gladstone in the lead role and with Reed Morano slated as director and Charlie Kaufman as screenwriter.

== Plot ==
The story follows a novelist on an island under the control of the Memory Police. An unknown force causes the people of the island to collectively 'forget' and lose their attachment to objects or concepts, e.g. hats, perfume, birds and ribbon. As the inhabitants move on from the disappearances, the Memory Police enforce the removal of the disappeared objects from the island. The people who continue to remember, such as the author's mother, attempt to escape from the island or hide in safe houses to evade capture by the Police.

R, the author's editor, reveals himself to be one of those who still remembers the disappeared objects, and fears that he will be taken by the Memory Police. With the help of an old family friend, the protagonist arranges and hides R in a secret room in her home. While hiding, R then tries to help them recall some of the long disappeared objects to the author and the old man, though to no avail.

As the calendars disappear, the winter continues and spring never comes. Food is becoming scarce on the island. The Memory Police raid the author's house as they celebrate the old man's birthday, but fail to discover the secret room, leaving them free. Subsequently, novels disappear as well, and the protagonist works as a typist. On R's insistence, she continues to work on her novel and keeps some books. After an earthquake, some of her mother's sculptures, given back by a family friend, break and reveal more objects that had disappeared, including a ferry ticket and a harmonica. She decides to investigate her mother's cabin, which R believes contains more objects that have long disappeared. The author, along with the old man, manage to retrieve the objects and hide them in her home.

One day, the old man dies from a brain hemorrhage. Soon after, the inhabitants are made to forget some of their body parts, with the Memory Police capturing those who continue to retain their sense of the "disappeared" body parts. The author, despite much difficulty, manages to finish her novel of a love story that took a dark turn. The inhabitants, including the author, slowly began to accept their fate as they forget their own existence and vanish. Before disappearing, the author reassures R that he will be able to come out of hiding along with others who manage to preserve their memories.

== Reception ==
In an article naming it one of the best books of the Summer of 2019, Time wrote, "Ogawa's fable echoes the themes of George Orwell's 1984, Ray Bradbury's Fahrenheit 451, and Gabriel Garcia Marquez's 100 Years of Solitude, but it has a voice and power all its own." The Chicago Tribune called it: "A masterful work of speculative fiction [...] An unforgettable literary thriller full of atmospheric horror."

The New York Times compared it to the novels of Samuel Beckett and Kobo Abe, saying "Ogawa's ruminant style captures the alienation of being alive as the world's ecosystems, ice sheets, languages, animal species and possible futures vanish more quickly than any one mind can apprehend."

Michael Adam Carroll, writing in Ploughshares, was chilled by its timeliness: "Ogawa hits on something real in her novel—we must remember to write and write to remember, to ensure the survival of truth."

== Awards and recognition ==
The Memory Police was named a finalist for the 2019 National Book Award for Translated Literature, as well as for the 2020 International Booker Prize. It was also named a finalist for the 2020 World Fantasy Award.

== Publication history ==
- 密やかな結晶. Japan: Kodansha. 26 January 1994. ISBN 406205843X. 411 pages.
- The Memory Police. United States: Pantheon Books. 13 August 2019. ISBN 978-1-101-87060-0. 288 pages.
- The Memory Police. United Kingdom: Harvill Secker. 15 August 2019. ISBN 978-1-84655-949-5. 288 pages.

== Adaptations ==
=== Theatre ===
Angeliki Papoulia and Christos Passalis produced the play Absolute Magic (Απόλυτη Μαγεία) for the National Theatre of Northern Greece, inspired by Ogawa's novel.

=== Film adaptation ===
In October 2020, Amazon Studios announced a film adaptation of the novel with Reed Morano slated as director and Charlie Kaufman as screenwriter. In January 2024, it was reported that Lily Gladstone was attached to star.
