= The Housekeeper and the Professor =

Novel by Yōko Ogawa

- English language cover
- Author: Yōko Ogawa
- Original title: 博士の愛した数式
- Translator: Stephen Snyder
- Language: Japanese
- Genre: Fiction
- Set in: Japan
- Published: 2006
- Publisher: Picador
- Publication place: Japan
- English publication date: February 1, 2009
- Pages: 192
- Awards: Hon'ya Taisho
- ISBN: 978-0312427801

The Housekeeper and the Professor (博士の愛した数式, hakase no ai shita suushiki) (literally "The Professor's Beloved Equation") is a novel by Yōko Ogawa set in modern-day Japan. It was published in Japan in August 2003, by Shinchosha. In 2009, the English translation by Stephen Snyder was published.

== Background ==
The story centers around a mathematician, "the Professor," who suffered brain damage in a traffic accident in 1975 and since then can produce only 80 minutes' worth of memories. His interactions with the housekeeper (the narrator) and her son "Root" deepens as the Professor shares the beauty of equations and mathematics with them. The novel's bibliography lists the book The Man Who Loved Only Numbers, a biography of the mathematician Paul Erdős. It has been said that Erdős was used as a model for the Professor.

The novel received the Hon'ya Taisho award. Soon after, it was adapted into a film version in January 2006. After the paperback was published in December 2005, one million copies were sold in two months. This was faster than any other Shinchosha paperback.

== Plot summary ==
The narrator's housekeeping agency dispatches her to the house of the Professor, a former mathematician who can remember new memories for only 80 minutes. She is more than a little frustrated to find that he loves only mathematics and shows no interest whatsoever in anything or anyone else. Despite his memory condition, the Professor keeps notes clipped to his suit to remind himself of important facts, including the name and relationship of the housekeeper. One day, upon learning that she has a 10-year-old son waiting home alone until late at night every day, the Professor flies into a rage and tells the narrator to have her son come to his home directly from school from that day on. The next day, her son comes and the Professor nicknames him "Root". The nickname comes from the shape of the boy’s flat head, which reminds the Professor of a square root symbol. From then on, their days begin to be filled with warmth. The three of them develop a daily rhythm grounded in the Professor’s passion for mathematics, solving problems and exploring number theory together. As Root and the narrator grow fond of the Professor, his condition becomes less of a barrier and more a part of their unique bond. The Professor's quiet dignity and brilliance gradually transform their lives, revealing the emotional depth of a man who, despite his cognitive limits, expresses profound humanity through math.

== Characters ==
The Professor
64 years old. Former mathematician who earned a Ph.D in algebraic number theory from Cambridge and worked as a researcher at the institute under university. He loves numbers, children, and the Hanshin Tigers (especially Yutaka Enatsu, who was playing for the Tigers at the time of the Professor's accident and whose uniform number was 28, the second smallest perfect number). After being in an auto accident at the age of 47, he can retain new memories for only 80 minutes. He keeps important information on notes that are attached all over his suits. He keeps baseball cards and other important mementos in a cookie tin. He has trouble interacting with other people and a habit of talking about numbers when he does not know what else to say. He has a talent for reading things backwards and finding the first star in the sky. His 80 minutes of memory eventually begins to fail, and thus he is moved to a nursing home where he spends the rest of his remaining days. But the Housekeeper, her son Root, and his sister-in-law continue to visit him. While the Housekeeper is working for him, he teaches her and Root about many of the math skills he knows and loves.
The Narrator/Housekeeper
The Professor's housekeeper and a single mother. 28 years old. She was hired by the Professor's sister-in-law through the housekeeping agency and is the tenth housekeeper the Professor has gone through. She initially feels frustration at the Professor, who shows interest only in mathematics, but through observing the Professor's kindness and his passion for mathematics, comes to feel respect and affection for him. She first manages to connect with the Professor when he discovers that her birthday is February 20 (220), which is an amicable number with the number 284, which is imprinted on the underside of his watch, which he received as the University President's Award for a thesis he wrote in university on transcendental number theory. She cannot pronounce the title of the Journal of Mathematics (to which the Professor submits contest entries) very well, so she refers to it as "Jaanaru obu." Towards the end of the novel and at a pivotal point in the story, she and Root give the Professor a rare baseball card of Yutaka Enatsu as a congratulatory present.
Root
Ten years old. The Housekeeper's son. The Professor refers to him as "Root" on account of the top of his head being flat like a square root ($\sqrt{~~~~~}$) symbol. He is the only character given something close to a name. He is an avid fan of baseball as well as the Hanshin Tigers just like the Professor, and gets the Professor to repair his old radio so that they can listen to baseball broadcasts together. His relationship with the Professor is close to that of a father and son, for the Professor is the first fatherly figure in his life. He eventually grows up to become a junior high school mathematics teacher.
The Widow/Sister-in-Law
Sister-in-law of the Professor (wife of the Professor's brother). Initially, she fired the Housekeeper for disregarding the employment contract rules (bringing her child into a client's home, staying past her assigned hours) and accused the Housekeeper's affection as an attempt to extort money from the Professor. However, after the Professor writes down Euler's formula during this confrontation, the Widow immediately comes to accept the Housekeeper and Root. She cannot walk well, which the Housekeeper later discovers was a result of her being in the same auto accident as the Professor. While browsing through the Professor's baseball card collection in the cookie tin, the Housekeeper discovers an old photograph of a younger Professor and his sister-in-law. It is hinted that perhaps long ago the Professor and his sister-in-law once had romantic feelings for each other.

== Mathematical terminology that occurs in the story ==
- root
- imaginary number
- factorial
- amicable number
- prime number
- twin prime
- perfect number
- abundant number
- deficient number
- triangular number
- Ruth-Aaron pair
- Mersenne prime
- Napier's constant
- Euler's identity
- Fermat's Last Theorem
- Artin's conjecture

== Critical reception ==
The novel was the inaugural winner of the Hon'ya Taishō Award. A review for the Japan Times wrote: "Ogawa gently unfolds an elegant, charming equation for success, leaving the reader to muse about loss, memory and the magic of mathematics."

Dennis Overbye, writing for the New York Times, called it a "deceptively elegant" novel. Kirkus Reviews gave a positive review, writing the novel "deftly balances whimsy with heartache" and ultimately calling it a "simple story, well told". The New Yorker gave a mixed review, writing that although there were some touching scenes, the relationship between the housekeeper and the professor never built up to any great revelations.

== Film ==
A film based on the novel was released on January 21, 2006. It was directed by Takashi Koizumi.

In contrast to the original work, which is told from the perspective of the narrator, the film is shown from the perspective of 29-year-old "Root" as he recounts his memories of the Professor to a group of new pupils. Though there are a few differences between the film and the original work (for example, the movie touches on the relationship between the Professor and the widow, while the book does not give much detail), the film is generally faithful to the original.
