= Yōko Ogawa =

Japanese writer (born 1962)

Yōko Ogawa 小川 洋子
- Born: March 30, 1962 (age 64); Okayama, Okayama Prefecture, Japan
- Occupations: Novelist, short story writer, essayist
- Writing career
- Period: 1988–present
- Notable works: The Housekeeper and the Professor, The Memory Police
- Notable awards: Akutagawa Prize; 1990

Yōko Ogawa (小川 洋子, Ogawa Yōko; born March 30, 1962) is a Japanese writer. Her work has won every major Japanese literary award, including the Akutagawa Prize and the Yomiuri Prize. Internationally, she has been the recipient of the Shirley Jackson Award and the American Book Award. The Memory Police was also shortlisted for the International Booker Prize in 2020.

Some of her most well known works include The Memory Police, The Housekeeper and the Professor, The Diving Pool and Hotel Iris.

== Background and education ==
Ogawa was born in Okayama, Okayama Prefecture. Growing up in a family that followed the Konkōkyō religion, she was influenced by her upbringing in a household with deep religious and educational values. She graduated with a degree in literature from Waseda University, Tokyo. When she married her husband, a steel company engineer, she quit her job as a medical university secretary and wrote while her husband was at work. Initially, she wrote only as a hobby, and her husband didn't realise she was a writer until her debut novel, The Breaking of the Butterfly, received a literary prize. Her novella Pregnancy Diary, written in brief intervals when her son was a toddler, won the prestigious Akutagawa Prize for literature, thus cementing her reputation in Japan.

She currently lives in Ashiya, Japan.

== Career ==
Since 1988, Ogawa has published more than fifty works of fiction and nonfiction. Much of her work has yet to be translated into English. In 2006, she worked alongside the mathematician Masahiko Fujiwara to co-write "An Introduction to the World's Most Elegant Mathematics", a dialogue on the extraordinary beauty of numbers.

Her work has been published in the New Yorker, A Public Space and Zoetrope.

The 2005 French film L'Annulaire (The Ringfinger) was based in part on Ogawa's Kusuriyubi no hyōhon. Her novel The Housekeeper and the Professor was adapted into the movie The Professor's Beloved Equation. In partnership with Amazon studios, Reed Morano and Charlie Kaufman are set to adapt The Memory Police.

== Themes and influences ==
Kenzaburō Ōe has said, "Yoko Ogawa is able to give expression to the most subtle workings of human psychology in prose that is gentle yet penetrating." Her English translator, Stephen Snyder, has said that "There is a naturalness to what she writes so it never feels forced...Her narrative seems to be flowing from a source that's hard to identify."

Frequently, she explores the theme of memory in her works. For instance, The Housekeeper and the Professor follows a mathematics professor who cannot remember anything for longer than eighty minutes, and The Memory Police is about a group of islanders who gradually forget the existence of certain things, such as birds or flowers. Human cruelty features as another prominent theme in her work, as she is interested in exploring what drives people to commit acts of physical or emotional violence. She often writes about female bodies and the woman's role in a family, which has led many to label her as a feminist writer. Ogawa is hesitant about this label, stating instead that she "just peeked into [the world of her characters] and took notes from what they were doing".

The Diary of Anne Frank has been a significant source of inspiration to her throughout her career. She first encountered the diary as a teenager, and was inspired to start a diary of her own, writing back to Anne as though they were friends. She notes how "Anne's heart and mind were so rich," and that "her diary proved that people can grow even in such a confined situation. And writing could give people freedom." Given its themes of persecution and confinement, The Memory Police in particular is a response to Anne's diary and the Holocaust in general.

While at Waseda University, she was influenced by fellow Japanese authors such as Mieko Kanai, Kenzaburō Ōe, and Haruki Murakami. She also felt influenced by the American author Paul Auster, who she believes "writes a spoken literature—it feels like he's written down a story someone told him, rather than creating it himself. Shibata's translation was also very important, but when I read Moon Palace I thought 'This is how I'd like to write.' Like I'm just a medium for transferring a story from the world outside."

== Awards and honors ==
- 1988: Kaien Literary Prize (Benesse) for her debut The Breaking of the Butterfly (Agehacho ga kowareru toki, 揚羽蝶が壊れる時)
- 1990: Akutagawa Prize for Pregnancy Diary (Ninshin karendaa, 妊娠 カレンダー)
- 2004: Yomiuri Prize, Bookseller's Award for The Professor's Beloved Equation (Hakase no aishita sūshiki, 博士の愛した数式; translated as The Housekeeper and the Professor)
- 2004: Izumi Kyōka Prize for Burafuman no maisō, ブラフマンの埋葬
- 2006: Tanizaki Prize for Mina's Matchbox (Mīna no kōshin, ミーナの行進)
- 2008: Shirley Jackson Award for The Diving Pool
- 2014: Independent Foreign Fiction Prize shortlist for Revenge: Eleven Dark Tales (Japanese; trans. Stephen Snyder)
- 2020: American Book Award for The Memory Police (Japanese; trans. Stephen Snyder)
- 2021: Medal with Purple Ribbon
- 2022: Royal Society of Literature International Writer

== Works in English translation ==
=== Novels and novellas ===
- The Diving Pool (Daivingu pūru, ダイヴィング・プール, 1990; Ninshin karendā, 妊娠カレンダー, 1991; Dormitory, ドミトリイ, 1991); translated by Stephen Snyder, New York: Picador, 2008. ISBN 0-312-42683-6; published on The New York Times in 2006
- The Memory Police (Hisoyaka na kesshō, 密やかな結晶, 1994), translated by Stephen Snyder, Pantheon Books, 2019.
- Hotel Iris (Hoteru Airisu, ホテル・アイリス, 1996), translated by Stephen Snyder, Picador, 2010.
- The Housekeeper and the Professor (Hakase no ai shita sūshiki, 博士の愛した数式, 2003); translated by Stephen Snyder, New York: Picador, 2008. ISBN 0-312-42780-8
- Mina's Matchbox (Mīna no kōshin, ミーナの行進, 2006); translated by Stephen Snyder, New York: Pantheon, London: Harvill Secker, 2024.

=== Short stories and collections ===
- "Pregnancy Diary" (Ninshin karendā, 妊娠カレンダー, 1991); translated by Stephen Snyder, The New Yorker, 12/2005. Read here
- "The Cafeteria in the Evening and a Pool in the Rain" (Yūgure no kyūshoku shitsu to ame no pūru, 夕暮れの給食室と雨のプール, 1991); translated by Stephen Snyder, The New Yorker, 9/2004. Read here
- "Transit" (Toranjitto, トランジット, 1996); translated by Alisa Freedman, Japanese Art: The Scholarship and Legacy of Chino Kaori, special issue of Review of Japanese Culture and Society, Vol. XV (Center for Inter-Cultural Studies and Education, Josai University, December 2003): 114–125. ISSN 0913-4700
- "The Man Who Sold Braces" (Gibusu o uru hito, ギブスを売る人, 1998); translated by Motoyuki Shibata, Manoa, 13.1, 2001.
- Revenge: Eleven Dark Tales (Kamoku na shigai, midara na tomurai, 寡黙な死骸みだらな弔い,1998) Translated by Stephen Snyder, Picador, 2013.

== Other works ==
- Agehachō ga kowareru toki, 揚羽蝶が壊れる時, 1989, Kaien Prize
- Kanpeki na byōshitsu, 完璧な病室, 1989
- Same nai kōcha, 冷めない紅茶, 1990
- Shugā taimu, シュガータイム, 1991
- Yohaku no ai, 余白の愛, 1992
- Angelina Sano Motoharu to 10 no tanpen, アンジェリーナ―佐野元春と10の短編, 1993
- Yōsei ga mai oriru yoru, 妖精が舞い下りる夜, 1993
- Hisoyaka na kesshō, 密やかな結晶, 1994
- Kusuriyubi no hyōhon, 薬指の標本, 1994
- Rokukakukei no shō heya, 六角形の小部屋, 1994
- Anne Furanku no kioku, アンネ・フランクの記憶, 1995
- Shishū suru shōjo, 刺繍する少女, 1996
- Yasashī uttae, やさしい訴え, 1996
- Kamoku na shigai, midara na tomurai, 寡黙な死骸みだらな弔い, 1998
- Kōritsui ta kaori, 凍りついた香り, 1998
- Fukaki kokoro no soko yori, 深き心の底より, 1999
- Gūzen no shukufuku, 偶然の祝福, 2000
- Chinmoku hakubutsukan, 沈黙博物館, 2000
- Mabuta, まぶた, 2001
- Kifujin A no sosei, 貴婦人Aの蘇生, 2002
- Burafuman no maisō, ブラフマンの埋葬, 2004, Izumi Kyōka Prize
- Yo ni mo utsukushī sūgaku nyūmon, 世にも美しい数学入門, 2005 (An Introduction to the World's Most Elegant Mathematics)
- Inu no shippo o nade nagara, 犬のしっぽを撫でながら, 2006
- Otogibanashi no wasuremono, おとぎ話の忘れ物, 2006 (illustrated)
- Umi, 海 2006
- Hajimete no bungaku Ogawa Yōko, はじめての文学 小川洋子 2007
- Hakase no hondana, 博士の本棚, 2007
- Monogatari no yakuwari, 物語の役割, 2007
- Ogawa Yōko taiwa shū, 小川洋子 対話集, 2007 (conversations)
- Yoake no fuchi wo samayou hitobito, 夜明けの縁をさ迷う人々, 2007
- Kagaku no tobira wo nokku suru, 科学の扉をノックする, 2008
- Karā hiyoko to kōhīmame, カラーひよことコーヒー豆, 2009
- Kokoro to hibikiau dokusho annai, 心と響き合う読書案内, 2009
- Neko wo daite zou to oyogu, 猫を抱いて象と泳ぐ, 2009
- Genkou reimai nikki, 原稿零枚日記, 2010
- Mōsō kibun, 妄想気分, 2011
- Hitojichi no roudokukai, 人質の朗読会, 2011
- Tonikaku sanpo itashimasho, とにかく散歩いたしましょう, 2012
- Kotori, ことり, 2012
- Saihate ākēdo, 最果てアーケード, 2012
- Itsumo karera wa dokoka ni, いつも彼らはどこかに, 2013
- Kohaku no matataki, 琥珀のまたたき, 2015
- Fujichaku suru ryūsei tachi, 不時着する流星たち, 2017
- Kuchibue no jōzu na shirayukihime, 口笛の上手な白雪姫, 2018
- Kobako, 小箱, 2019
- Yakusoku sareta idō, 約束された移動, 2019

== Interviews ==
- "Writer Ogawa Yōko’s Stories of Memory and Loss" (by Kimie Itakura),'"Nippon com", March 2020
- Yoko Ogawa Loves Finding Love at the Bookstore August 2024
