= Revenge: Eleven Dark Tales =

1998 short story collection by Yōko Ogawa

- Author: Yoko Ogawa
- Original title: 寡黙な死骸みだらな弔い
- Translator: Stephen Snyder
- Language: Japanese
- Publisher: Picador (imprint)
- Publication date: 1998
- Publication place: Japan
- English publication date: 2013
- ISBN: 9784408533407 Original Japanese edition
- OCLC: 759914122

Revenge: Eleven Dark Tales (寡黙な死骸みだらな弔い, Kamoku na shigai, Midara na tomurai) is a collection of interconnected short stories by Yōko Ogawa. It was published in Japan in 1998, and in the United States by Picador in 2013. Stephen Snyder translated the book into English.

== Stories ==
=== "Afternoon at the Bakery" ===
A narrator of an unknown gender visits a bakery on their son's birthday. When they arrive, no one is at the counter, and they sit down to wait. While waiting, an elderly woman comes in and sits next to them, and after some conversation, the narrator reveals that their son is dead. As they sit meditating on the day they found their son—who died of suffocation after crawling into a refrigerator—and the aftermath of his death, they notice a young woman in the back of the shop, weeping. Rather than intervene, they watch the woman cry and wait for her to come out. The story ends with the narrator repeating to themselves what they plan to say when the young woman comes out: “Two strawberry shortcakes, please.”

=== "Fruit Juice" ===
The narrator, whose gender remains ambiguous throughout the story, is approached by a girl in their university library, where she asks them to lunch on the coming Saturday. Though the invitation comes as a surprise, they accept, and the girl is visibly relieved. On Saturday, when they meet, the girl reveals that her mother is dying has instructed her to contact a man who she has never met, who we are made to understand is her father. They sit down in an upscale French restaurant, where the girl's father orders an ostentatious amount of expensive food, making no mention of her mother or the financial struggles they've faced in the years that he has refrained from contacting them. The narrator does little to contribute to the conversation and watches them interact stiltedly until dessert arrives. The girl's father offers to give them a ride home, but she refuses, notably also refusing to take the subway back to their neighborhood. On their walk, during which the girl is incredibly exhausted, she expresses gratitude for the narrator's presence during the meeting, and tells the narrator about her mother, who is a musician-turned-typist with beautiful, elegant hands. They take a break on a bench and the narrator remarks on the girl's own hands, which are like her mothers. They are sitting in front of a closed post-office that has been there since they were children and, curious, the girl decides to take a look inside. She and the narrator peer through a crack in the door to see a mountain of kiwis. Violently, the girl breaks the lock on the door, and once inside, gorges herself on kiwis. The narrator remarks that the girl left university soon afterwards to pursue culinary school. They never saw each other again, but the narrator called her five years afterwards at her place of work—a bakery—to apologize for not being much help during the lunch with her father, causing her to weep and thank them again for being there.

=== "Old Mrs. J" ===
A woman moves into an apartment next to a large kiwi orchard. She lives across the courtyard from her elderly landlady, Mrs. J, who owns the orchard and cultivates a large garden in the complex and distributes produce to her favorite tenants. The narrator finds herself watching Mrs. J often, becoming familiar with her daily routine. After the narrator tells Mrs. J that the best way to keep the cats away from her produce beds is to spread pine needles around them, Mrs. J brings her fresh produce and comes over for tea frequently, often remarking that the narrator seems tense and that she would gladly offer her a massage for free. When the narrator asks Mrs. J where her husband is, Mrs. J states that he was a drunk who gambled away all the money she made from rent and didn't work and that one night he disappeared, presumably falling drunkenly into the sea. One night, as the narrator is up late working on a manuscript, she sees Mrs. J on top of a middle aged man on her bed. She remarks that it appears Mrs. J is strangling him, though she is just giving him a massage. Another night, she sees Mrs. J running across the kiwi orchard, carrying a large box entirely full of kiwis away at a full sprint. Soon afterwards, Mrs. J begins to dig up carrots that look like pudgy human hands. She gives the first to the narrator, but as they become more plentiful, begins to distribute them amongst her tenants. This brings the attention to the local press, and Mrs. J is photographed with the narrator and a few other tenants holding the oddly shaped carrots. After what seems like some time, the narrator is interviewed by the police, who ask her if she knew what had happened to Mrs. J's husband, or if she had seen anything strange. The narrator repeats what her landlady told her about her husband and tells them about the incident with the kiwis. The police search an abandoned post office nearby and find a large number of kiwis and the corpse of a cat, but nothing else. It's only when they bulldoze the garden that they find the body of Mrs. J's husband, whose hands are missing.

=== "The Little Dustman" ===
A man travels on a train to the funeral of a woman he refers to as "Mama," which is what he called his father's second wife, a writer. The narrator lost his mother when he was very young after she picked at a pimple inside of her nose and died of sepsis when it became infected. Mama was a noticeably diminutive woman who was only 14 years older than the narrator when she married his father. Though only in his life for two years, the narrator was deeply affected by Mama's presence in his life. She was a writer, but instructed him to never tell his father this fact, and loved to share her stories with him. The narrator describes walking in on her talking to herself often, though he never understood what she was saying. The bulk of the story is taken up by his remembering a particular trip to the zoo where Mama remarked on the absurdity of giraffes' long necks. He vividly remembers getting mediocre ice cream and doing his best to look like he was enjoying himself to make her feel better. After the funeral, he is given a box of her belongings, and it includes a picture of Mama with a thin old woman, both of them holding carrots shaped like human hands.

=== "Lab Coats" ===
Two women work as secretaries in a large hospital. As part of their duties, they count and sort dirty lab coats and place them in the laundry. The narrator is very attracted to the woman she's working with, to the point of ignoring rather large faults in her personality, such as her tendency to talk only about herself, her blaming a mistake in a presentation for a doctor on the narrator, and the fact that her boyfriend is a married doctor with children. One night, while they are sorting the coats, the beautiful woman is distracted and cannot stop talking about her boyfriend. She relays that her boyfriend had taken a train to see his in-laws a few nights before, ostensibly to tell them about his pending divorce (which he still hasn't told his wife, who has just given birth, about). He was supposed to see her afterwards and tell her how it went. Over the course of the conversation, the woman completely abandons the task and focuses solely on what happened when her boyfriend came over, late, and told her that he felt an invisible force was holding him back from telling them and he hadn't even made it there. She states he is always full of excuses, when it comes to telling his wife, why he is late, or whenever he breaks off plans. Finally, she reveals that the night before, overcome with hurt, frustration, and rage, she killed him. The narrator comes across his lab coat, and as she takes note of it and shakes it, a tongue falls out of the pocket.

=== "Sewing for the Heart" ===
The narrator walks into a hospital, where a doctor is being called repeatedly over the intercom to report to illustration. When the narrator asks a secretary why they are calling him, they state they have not seen him all day. The narrator then makes his way to the cardiac ward, and we begin to travel backwards to how he got to this point. The narrator is a bagmaker, and is known for being able to make or repair any kind of bag. He is very proud of the purpose of bags, and is fascinated by them—his nightly routine includes watching people walk past on the street, observing the bags they carry. One day, a pretty woman comes into his shop and tells him that she needs him to make a bag that can hold a human heart. The woman reveals that she was born with her heart outside of her body and she is seeking a bag to protect and hold it. The bagmaker is disgusted but curious about what it will look like to see a human heart outside of the body, and agrees. They agree that sealskin is the best material, she leaves, and he gets to work. Once he has a prototype sketched for the bag, he leads her up to his apartment to take measurements in private. She takes off her blouse, and while he remarks on the shapeliness of her body, he is transfixed by her heart, which is fully visible and connected to her by large visible veins and ventricles. As he takes measurements, his fingers brush the heart and he remarks on how warm it is. He becomes obsessed with it, and the bag that will hold it. Over an indeterminable period of time, he neglects his other duties, including regular clients and his pet hamster, whose corpse he disposes of in a trashcan outside a fast food restaurant, to work on the bag. He is obsessed with the idea of making something that no one else could make. Once he has a prototype for the bag, he goes to the club where she works, and watches her sing, obsessing over every movement and every measure she takes to conceal her heart. Soon afterwards, she comes back to his apartment for a fitting, and while there are a couple adjustments that need to be made, he is overwhelmingly pleased with his work, and so is she. However, after he has made these adjustments, she tells him that she has found a heart surgeon who has devised a new method to place her heart inside of her body, and while she will pay him for the bag, she will no longer be needing it. The narrator is distressed by this, the idea of her not wearing it, of the heart not being inside the bag he made unbearable. Now back in the elevator, the narrator reveals he is there to convince the woman to try on the bag, so that once it is inside he can cut her heart away from her body and take it with him.

=== "Welcome to the Museum of Torture" ===
A woman who lives in the same building where the woman from apartment 508 use to live, gets dumped by her boyfriend when she tells him about what the woman from apartment 508 did to her boyfriend “Dr Y”. Now the woman roams around the plaza next day where the bakery and fountain is, after walking a little further she finds a house and it is named “the museum of torture.” She felt an urge to go inside and explore so she goes in and finds no one. The house looked like someone rich lived in it. Suddenly a man comes in, pretty old but well built and dressed. He then asks her if she's here to contribute an object of torture or to take the tour. She asks for a tour so the man takes her inside. They explore various torture items from 18th century and before. The woman is a hair dresser and when she is shown a torture object related to hair, she decides that she'll take it and torture her boyfriend with it. She imagines it and feels really good. At the end of the tour, she asks the guide if she can come again, the guide answers that she's welcome anytime, he'll be expecting her to come soon.

=== "The Man Who Sold Braces" ===
A man starts to reminisce about his uncle after getting a call that he has died by strangulation. The man remembers when he was young, and when his uncle would come visit his family. His uncle was kind but strange, always bringing a gift for the boy and telling stories of the work he had been doing. But he is very clumsy and "Everything my uncle touched seemed to fall apart in the end." At one visit, the uncle brings the boy a brace that he has made which he promises will make him taller. When the boy puts it on, it causes him extreme discomfort and even some pain, and so he takes it off immediately. Another time, the uncle tells him of the work he is doing, which entails taking care of a Bengal tiger in the possession of two rich old women. He also takes care of their collection of torture devices. The story flash forwards to the man visiting his uncle on his deathbed, in an apartment full of junk. The two share a heartfelt moment before the uncle gifts him a fur coat, and the man leaves. As the man leaves the apartment, the fur coat falls apart, piece by piece.

=== "The Last Hour of the Bengal Tiger" ===
The narrator, who is married to a doctor, is driving to the apartment of their husband’s secretary and wants to confront her for having an affair with him. On the way there, the narrator uses repeated observations of objects to dictate the route of their journey. Just as they enter a bridge, they get held up by traffic, which was caused by an overturned truck. The narrator observes that tomatoes roll out of the truck and decides to hit them with their car. They then recall the first time they saw their husband’s secretary – they peeked into the secretarial pool and saw her chaotically working on documents, contravening the narrator’s expectations of the secretary “discharging her duties in an elegant manner”.

The narrator eventually parks near the apartment and walks there while recalling instances in their life where they were rejected. They get lost and end up at a large stone house. The narrator enters the house and finds a crouching tiger next to an old man. They approaches the old man and enquires him about the tiger, and he reveals that the tiger is dying. The narrator and the old man pets and strokes the tiger until it dies. The old man continues to craddle the tiger while the narrator leaves the house and returns to their car. After turning on the car’s ignition switch, the narrator reflects on what “[their palms] had just done” and drives off. While driving, they notice that the tomatoes are no longer on the bridge.

=== "Tomatoes and the Full Moon" ===
A man goes on a work trip to write about a hotel for woman's magazine. Upon opening the door to his room, he finds a lady, described to be "doll-like", and a black labrador dog that accompanies her. The lady claims that the room is hers, but as she does not have a room key, the narrator forces her to vacate. The next day, the man is about to leave the hotel to visit a fish market, but he notices that the lady who was in his room yesterday was now outside of the hotel's kitchen persuading a cook to buy her tomatoes. The narrator goes into the hotel's dining room and tastes the food, but noticed that his omelette and salad had a lot of tomatoes on them. The lady sits at the narrator's table and engages in a conversation with him – she reveals that the tomatoes were sourced from a truck carrying tomatoes that overturned at a bridge. The lady departs from the conversation before the narrator can leave the dining room. At night, the narrator climbs up a hill to an observation point, and the lady joins him again. The man enquires to the lady why she is here, and she confesses that the narrator was the same person as a man who saved her and her ten-year-old child thirty years ago in a snow storm. The narrator reveals that he has a ten-year-old son, but following a divorce with his wife seven years ago, he has not seen the son since.

The next day, the man does a photo shoot of the lady in the hotel library. He asks the lady to lower a bundle she was holding, but she refuses to. After the photo shoot, he asks the lady what was in the bundle. She reveals that the bundle contains a manuscript of a book she was writing since pages of her previous manuscript kept getting stolen from her home by burglars, and was eventually published by a lady with hunchback who claimed to have written the book. She gives the narrator a copy of one of her books that was not affected by the burglaries, entitled An Afternoon at the Bakery. At night, the narrator reads the book, finding himself to keep rereading the book. He inspects the book's back cover and found the picture of the book's author to be a lady with a hunchback, along with the fact that she disappeared in 1997. A day later, the man exercises in the hotel's pool, with the lady cheering him on, but when he finished exercising, the man found the lady and the dog to have disappeared. As he was checking out of his room, he enquired about the lady to the hotel concierge staff, and they reveal that they were familiar with her. Before the narrator leaves the hotel, he notices that the lady's bundle was on a deckchair at the hotel pool. He opens the bundle to find a blank piece of paper.

- "Poison Plants"

== Reception ==
The work won the 2014 Independent Foreign Fiction Prize shortlist.

Alan Cheuse of National Public Radio wrote that "this collection may linger in your mind — it does in mine — as a delicious, perplexing, absorbing and somehow singular experience."

Kirkus Reviews wrote that the book was "well-written" and that "although the stories may be perceived as gruesome, the author paints each tale exquisitely."
