= Phil Day (artist) =

Australian artist

- Born: Phillip Warren Day; 13 August 1973 (age 53); Goulburn, New South Wales
- Education: Australian National University
- Known for: Drawing, printmaking, artist's books, writing

Phil Day (born 13 August 1973) is an Australian artist. He is formally recognised as a Notable Graduate from the Graphic Investigation Workshop, Australian National University (ANU), alongside Alex Hamilton, Paul McDermott, Danie Mellor and Paul Uhlmann.

Day's body of work comprises prints, artist's books, drawings and watercolours. Various institutions have collected his work, including the National Gallery of Australia, National Library of Australia, State Library of New South Wales, State Library of Queensland, State Library Victoria, and the Baillieu Library (Melbourne University).

== Life ==
Day, a lineal descendant of Wong Ah Sat, was born in Goulburn, New South Wales, living in the same house for his entire childhood and adolescent years. At age 16, he briefly trained as a graphic designer at the NSW Police Academy. Rather than pursue graphic design as a career, Day enrolled at the local technical college to study art. In 1992, he moved to Canberra to study at the Canberra School of Art, ANU (graduating with a Bachelor of Art with First Class Honours). While still a student, he worked as an illustrator and caricaturist at The Canberra Times. He abandoned this path in 1996, choosing instead to work as a printer, binder, and designer of books for the Edition + Artist's Book Studio, ANU. In 1997, Day co-founded Finlay Press, and in the same year he lost the vision in his left eye due to a congenital deformity. In early 2010, he moved to Melbourne, founded Mountains Brown Press, and met his future wife. Together they moved to Toronto, Canada (2010), then to Brooklyn, NY (2011). Day lives in Melbourne, with his wife and their daughter.

== Drawings ==
Day first came to public attention in 2000 when he was invited to exhibit in the Australian Drawing Biennale. There his drawings were shown alongside those of Davida Allen, Rick Amor, Guo Jian, Euan Macleod, John Olsen, Gloria Petyarre, and Harry Wedge, among others. The exhibition catalogue states:

"[Day] looks at things for himself … This is a rare quality, particularly when so many practitioners in the visual arts claim to be bored with image-making and, as a substitute, flirt with ideas."

Primarily, Day's work is pictorial: at times detailed and realistic, while at other times brief and gestural – Peter Keneally describes Day's brief-gestural drawings as: deliriously smudgy and slapdash.

There is an understated mood in Day's work, both in subject and material. His pictures invite the viewer into a one-on-one relationship with common things, this includes domestic objects, urban animals, garden plants, and the occasional portrait. It also includes memories, thoughts, and imaginary figurative inventions. All of which, are almost exclusively worked on modest size sheets of paper with modest materials (often coloured pencil and watercolour). In 2003, Sasha Grishin, art historian and critic, said:

"There is a certain disarming honesty in [Day's] drawing, which are as much visual observations as they are thought-pictures ... between the seen and observed reality, and the realm of abstract thoughts and carnal desires."

From 2004 onward, Day has almost exclusively created images for artist's books, often in collaboration with Australian authors, including: Cassandra Atherton, Gary Catalano, Julian Davies, James Grieve, and Robin Wallace-Crabbe. In 2015, Day discussed aspects of illustration as a guest panellist on Collaboration at the Adelaide Writers' Week.

== Artist's books ==
A brief biographical note states: Phil Day has enjoyed illustrating other people's writing, then binding the results into books, since he was sixteen. An early example of an artist's book illustrated by Day is Imaginary Thoughts and Their Beings (1995). Day became more prolific when he co-founded Finlay Press in 1997. By the close of Finlay Press in 2009, Day had illustrated 16 of Finlay Press's 23 titles. They are: Burly Gryphon (1997), Hungry Magpies (1997), Bomber (1997), Fth (1998), The Last Lost Doughnut (1998), Formingle (1998), Household: Eleven Poems (1998), A Pile of Hair (2003), Top Ten Twentieth Century Monsters (2003), Through Hoops (2005), Familiar Objects (2005), Goodbye Eggcup (2006), Cat's Eye (2008), I’ll Build A Stairway To Paradise (2008), Day By Day (2009), Four Men and Their Ideas on the Erotic. Caren Florance remarked:

" ... some of the most exciting untraditional private press work in Australia."

In 2010, Day moved to Melbourne, and founded his private press – Mountains Brown Press. No longer having access to printing presses, Day altered his approach in order to continue his interest in making books. The most notable change being each book written in pencil by his hand. State Library of Victoria, History of the Book manager, Des Cowley observed:

"… [Day's Mountain Brown Press artist's books] represent an art stripped back to basics, a cathartic attempt to re-engage with the physical properties of the book, without the intervening layer of metal type and presses … there is a sense of spiritual renewal to be found here."

As of 2017, Day began collaborating with lithographer Adrian Kellett (of Sunshine Editions); artist and intaglio printer Greg Harrison; and designer binder Suzanne Schmollgruber (of Centro del bel libro Ascona, Switzerland).

=== Mountains Brown Press: titles ===
- New Leaves (2010)
- An Amateur's Look at Ornithology Around the World (2010)
- A Very Short Poem (2010)
- The Elusive Moose (2010)
- The Day is Hers (2010)
- Look Look! Chook! Chook! Tuk-tuk! (Gorakhpur) (2010)
- 425 (2011)
- Poppy-cock (sure) (2013)
- Look See! Said the Cyclops (2013)
- Nothing Doing (2013)
- Sketch-Notes (Vol. 1, 2, & 3). (2015)
- Dilly Dally. (2016)
- 000001. (2014-2016)
- Sketch-Notes (Vol. 4). (2018)

=== Published artist's books: titles ===
- Shoe is Undone. (2017)

== Writings ==
Day's earliest writings appear in two Finlay Press titles: Familiar Objects (2005), and Goodbye Eggcup (2006). From 2010 to 2013 all Mountains Brown Press titles contain his writing. In 2012, Day wrote an essay for publication and review: Why Qi Baishi is better for me than Damien Hirst. Scott McCulloch, Australian Book Review, commented:

"Spontaneous in his approach, Day utilizes various bits of visual information: tables, lists, Shakespeare quotes, typography that verges on concrete poetry … it sounds messy, but the connection and slippages of these digression make for an intoxicating and dissonant piece of prose."

Exaggerated self-reflection [...] makes the joy of beauty, or art, hard to hold. It's like picking up fresh snow with the dirtiest mittens. Not only do you tarnish the clean white snow, you can also no longer feel its soft powdery touch.

— Phil Day, 2014. Why Qi Baishi is Better for Me than Damien Hirst.

Day has continued to write using 'connections', 'slippages', and 'digressions', evident in his A Chink in a Daisy-Chain (2017), the first in a three-book series. A Chink in a Daisy-Chain concentrates on the embattled nature of individual intellectual and creative autonomy. Fiona Capp (Sydney Morning Herald) comments:

"In the spirit of the absurdist and playful logic that characterises the Alice books, A Chink in a Daisy-Chain takes us into the rabbit warren of Day's mind as he free associates, one thought leading to another in a stream of consciousness ..."

Similar to his artist's books, included in Chink in a Daisy-Chain is a drawing by Day illustrating The Wasp in a Wig – the suppressed chapter from Carroll's Through the Looking-Glass, and What Alice Found There. Day's illustration recreates the style of John Tenniel's original illustrations.

=== Non-fiction books ===
- Lost Art: two essays on cultural dysfunction (with Julian Davies) (2012) ISBN 9780977567768
- A Chink in a Daisy-Chain (with a foreword by Anna Welch) (2017) ISBN 9780994516527

=== Contributions to journals and newspapers ===
- Beating Richie Knucklez: the making of a Space Invaders world champion, (Mon 12 Nov 2018)
- Three Artists' Relationship to the Book, Imprint, Volume 49 (2014)
- When a Book Becomes a Work of Art, Verso, 5. (2017) ISSN 2205-4405

== Illustrated books ==
In 1995, while still a student, Day held his first solo exhibition displaying his illustrations for François Rabelais's Gargantua and Pantagruel. Inspiration from these early illustrations has carried into Day's recent work. Dorothy Johnston, Sydney Morning Herald, observed:

His line drawings enhance the mood of each scene, lightening it, sending up characters locked in earnest or self-serving conversation, or hopelessly in love; at other times giving a darker, sinister flavour to events ... revellers disguised as politicians, celebrities and cartoon animals tumble over one another right out of the frame.

Day has created illustrations (cover or page) for the following titles.

- Lost Words, Xavier Hennekinne (author) (2019) ISBN 9780987619167
- Call Me, Julian Davies (2018) ISBN 9780994516541
- Pika-Don Cassandra Atherton and Alyson Miller, (2017) ISBN 978-0646979823
- And Jump, Adam Collier (2016) ISBN 9780995090705
- Who said what, exactly, Hartmann Wallis (Robin Wallace-Crabbe) (2016) ISBN 9780994516510
- Trace, Cassandra Atherton (2015) ISBN 9780987592996
- Crow Mellow, Julian Davies (2014) ISBN 9780987592941
- Six, John Clanchy (2014) ISBN 9780987592934
- The Wild Goose, Mori Ogai. English translation: Meredith McKinney (2014) ISBN 9780987592927
- Bruno Kramzer, A. S. Patrić (2013) ISBN 9780987592903
- Something in Common, James Grieve (2010) ISBN 9780977567744
- The Harp & The Sword, John Kelly Q.C. (1996) ISBN 0867861819

== Exhibitions ==
The first public exhibition of Day's work was in Switzerland at Museum of Art, Le Locle, Switzerland (1995). His books and drawings have since been exhibited in numerous exhibitions both locally and abroad. Most recently: Mirror of the World, State Library of Victoria, Melbourne (2016); and Impact 9, China Academy of Art, Hangzhou, China (2015).

== Residencies/grants ==
VicArts Grants (with Cassandra Atherton & Alyson Miller), for international research and development of a graphic verse novel, that reflects on the anniversary of the first atomic bomb being dropped on Hiroshima and the 150th anniversary of the publication of Alice's Adventures in Wonderland.

Artist-in-residence at Edith Cowan University (ECU), Perth. 2013. While at ECU, Day commenced and complete an artist's book: And the dead & And the beast (Fold Editions).

== Miscellaneous ==
2020, Day was invited by Julia Leigh to illustrate her cartoon captions and concepts for submission to The New Yorker. Their first cartoon was published in the 31 August 2020 issue of The New Yorker under the initials 'J.P'. New Yorker cartoonist, Michael Maslin, said of Day's illustrative style: '[...] reminded me, stylistically, in various ways, of Felipe Galindo, C.E.M. [Charles Elmer Martin], and ever-so-slightly, Edward Gorey.'

2018, Day was invited to compete at Meow Wolf's Score Wars: Galaga World Championship, Santa Fe, New Mexixo, USA.

2015, Day wrote, designed, and illustrated Sol, a tabletop role-playing game. ISBN 9780994411303

2009, Day claimed the world record for the arcade game Galaga officiated by Twin Galaxies.
