= Gazebo Books =

Publishing company in Sydney

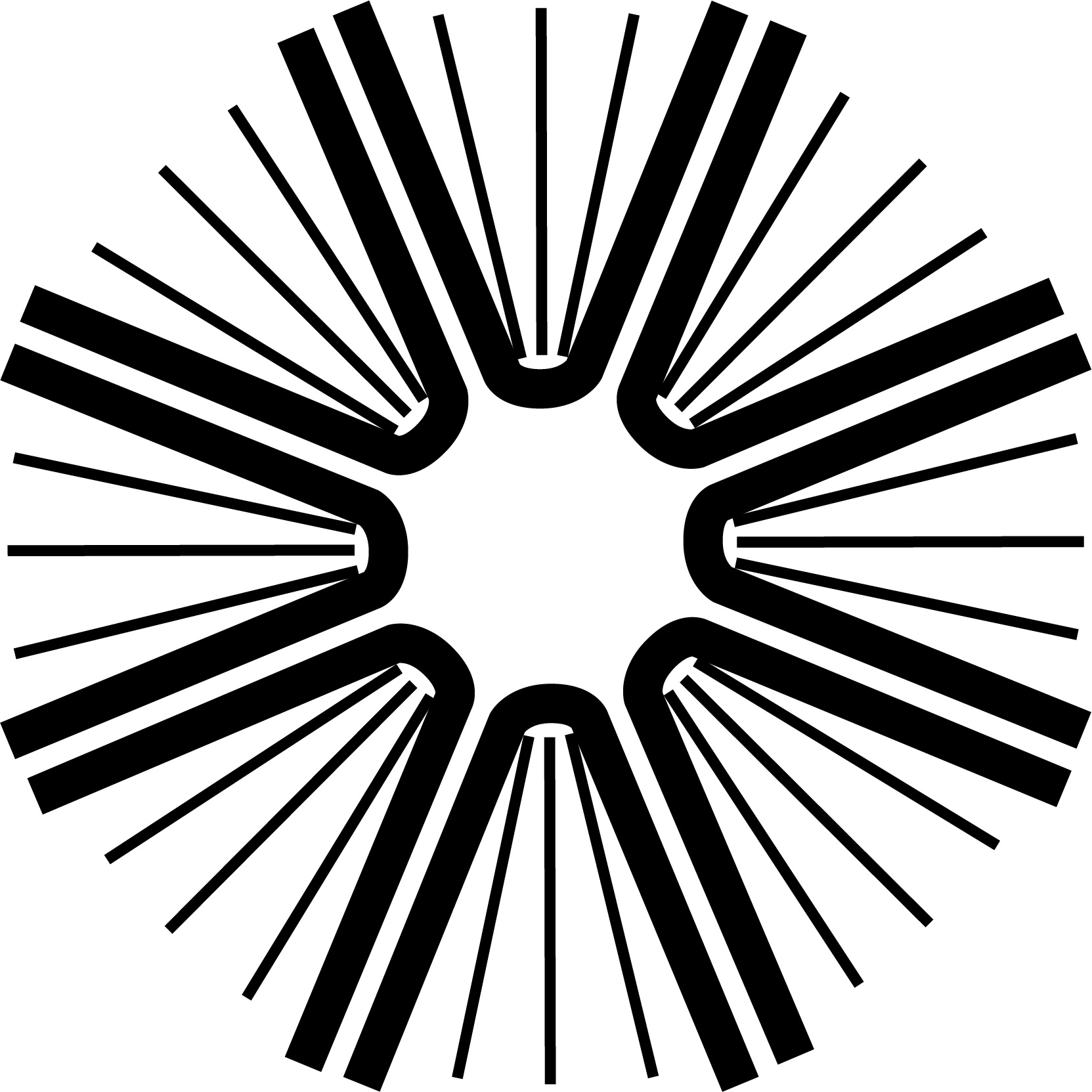
Gazebo Books' logo

Gazebo Books is an Australia-based independent publisher of literary fiction, non-fiction and poetry.

== Background ==
Gazebo Books was co-founded by writer Xavier Hennekinne and has been publishing literary works of international and Australian fiction and non-fiction since 2018. Authors published include Catherine Rey, Sanaz Fotouhi, Sreedhevi Iyer, Katia Ariel, artist Patrick Hartigan, Lydie Salvayre, Wanjikũ Wa Ngũgĩ, comic artist Mandy Ord and Nobel Prize winner Elfriede Jelinek.

In 2020, Gazebo Books launched its poetry imprint Life Before Man, edited by artist Phil Day, and releasing collections by S. K. Kelen, Cassandra Atherton, Paul Hetherington, Subhash Jaireth, Anthony Lawrence, Alex Selenitsch, Naveen Kishore, Kimberly Williams and Natalie Cooke, and the international anthology Alcatraz (subscription required). Alan Fyfe's poetry collection G-d, Sleep, and Chaos, published under Gazebo's Life Before Man imprint, won both the Western Australian Premier's Book Award for Poetry Book of the Year and the overall Book of the Year (sponsored by Writing WA) in 2025, announced 29 August 2025 — Fyfe's first win after three consecutive years on the shortlist.

Gazebo Books commissions translations into English. Notably, in December 2022, it released Around the world with writers, scientists and philosophers, by French philosopher Michel Serres, translated by Gila Walker, and in August 2023, The Mud of a Century by Yuka Ishii, translated by Haydn Trowell. Trowell also translated Schoolgirl by Rie Qudan, which was released in March 2025.

In March 2024, Katia Ariel's memoir The Swift Dark Tide was shortlisted for the Stella Prize.

Gazebo Books publications are distributed by New South Books through Alliance Distribution Services.
