= Light and Water =

2002 poetry collection by Gary Catalano

- Author: Gary Catalano
- Illustrator: Robin Wallace-Crabbe
- Language: English
- Genre: Prose poetry collection
- Publisher: Finlay Press
- Publication date: 2002
- Publication place: Australia

Light and Water is a Finlay Press title. It is a collection of forty prose poems by Gary Catalano. None of the poems takes more than a page. They are set in 10pt Baskerville with no italic, except for the book or journal titles listed in the acknowledgements; no bold; and no colour, except for Flame Red for the title on the title page and a stripe of etching down the front cover printed in Ruby Red. This stripe – an etching by Robin Wallace-Crabbe - matches similar etching stripes also drawn by Wallace-Crabbe on sixteen of the forty pages of text. Each stripe bleeds off the fore-edge and, indeed, bleeds over onto the next page. So there are eight etchings, each providing two stripes. The etchings were printed first on an etching press followed by the text printed on a flatbed machine. Printing is on one side only of each sheet of Magnani paper, which is folded and bound with Japanese stabs into the spine of the French false cover. The slipcase is Kraft stock, on which a linocut by Robin Wallace-Crabbe is printed in warm red.
