= Julian Davies (author) =

Australian author

- Born: 23 June 1954 (age 72); Melbourne, Australia
- Occupation: Novelist
- Writing career
- Genre: Literary fiction

Julian Davies (born 23 June 1954) is an Australian author, co-founder and publisher of the non-profit press Finlay Lloyd, and Executive Officer of the Consensus Education Foundation.

== Life ==
Davies was born on 23 June 1954 in Melbourne. Best known as a novelist, Davies has also written stories and non-fiction, made ceramics and paintings, and established the non-profit art gallery The Left Hand. A short bio describes Davies as: ... writer, potter, painter and front-man for a non profit art gallery. Davies also co-founded the non-profit press Finlay Lloyd Publishers. Between 1972 and the late 1980s Davies trained and worked as a ceramicist, establishing a workshop and gallery in Canberra. In the early 80s he spent two years in New York, (subsequently, two of his novels, Revival House and The Boy were set in New York). Returning from New York, he built a ceramic workshop and painting studio and house in the mountains near Braidwood, NSW, moving there permanently in 1988. Building in this remote setting are written about in the biographical essay Out of Town. By the late 80s he began to concentrate on writing novels. In 2005, he co-founded Finlay Lloyd Publishers. And in 2010 Davies established The Left Hand.

== Works ==
Davies sent his first manuscript, Revival House, to Penguin unsolicited in 1990, where it was published in 1991. While the book proved controversial, it received many enthusiastic reviews. Helen Elliott wrote in the Melbourne Herald: ‘The prose is spare and clean, the assurance is enviable, the tone measured, infallible...’ and Rob Johnson wrote in the Adelaide Advertiser: ‘...a tour de force... a strikingly accomplished performance.’

Davies’ novels are considerably varied in their stylistic approach and thematic concerns but share an overall interest in the relationship between sensual experience and how we conduct our lives, between our passions and our ethical concerns. James Bradley wrote for the Sydney Morning Herald, ‘The point for Davies, in this beautifully crafted and exquisitely controlled novel (The Beholder) is that... it is only through affection and engagement that we can ever truly live nobly.’ Fiona Capp, writing for Australian Book Review, stated that Revival House was ‘...tremendously impressive... the writing is controlled and elegant,’. Pete Wolfe, a professor for the University of Missouri, wrote that ‘The area where he (Davies) exerts his mastery with most cunning is that of language. Luminous and tactile, the prose tracks so smoothly it conceals the grip it exerts. Again and again, he finds the right word, the right inflection, and the right angle... Style lends distinction of all kinds...

His most recent novel, with drawings on nearly every page by Phil Day (artist), takes the novel to a new place. 'Crow Mellow makes no secret of its strangeness... (it) wants not simply to look different but to be read differently too.’ (Michael Richardson, The Newtown Review of Books).

== Acclaim ==
Revival House was shortlisted for the NBC Fiction Award, for the FAW Barabara Ramsdaen Best Book of the Year Award, and for the Commonwealth Writers' Prize (South East Asia and South Pacific Region) Best First Book. Moments of Pleasure was shortlisted for the 1995 Talking Book of the Year Award. The Beholder was shortlisted the NSW Premiers Award for Fiction. The Boy was shortlisted for the Victorian Premiers Award for Fiction.

== Bibliography ==
=== Novels ===
- Revival House (1991) ISBN 9780140146240
- Love Parts (1992) ISBN 9780140169850
- Moments of Pleasure (1994) ISBN 9780140239669
- The Beholder (1996) ISBN 9780140257649
- The Boy (2003) ISBN 9781877008818 (also Actes Sud, France; Anthos, Netherlands; istiklal kitabevi, Turkey)
- Crow Mellow (with drawings by Phil Day) (2014) ISBN 9780987592941
- Call Me (with drawings by Phil Day) (2018) ISBN 9780994516541

=== Non-Fiction Books ===
- Lost Art: two essays on cultural dysfunction (with Phil Day) (2012) ISBN 9780977567768
- Backlash: Australia’s conflict of values over live exports (with Bidda Jones) (2016) ISBN 9780994516503

=== Stories in Collections, Journals and Hand-Printed Books ===
- Ducks in Microstories (1993) ISBN 9780207177699
- In Praise of Eva in Men Love Sex, (1995) ISBN 9780091831011
- Footloose in National Library of Australia News, vol.5, No 6., (1995)
- Saxophone in Red Hot Notes, (1996) ISBN 9780702228537
- Love and Nuts in Below the Waterline (1999) ISBN 9780732266165
- A Pile of Hair, (with etchings by John Pratt and monotypes by Phil Day) (2003) Finlay Press artist's book
- Memento Mori in Meanjin, vol 63. no 3., (2004)
- Cats Eye, with engravings by Phil Day (artist) (2008) Finlay Press artist's book

=== Short Non-Fiction in Collections and Journals ===
- Wet and Dry Dreams, in There is no Mystery (1999)
- Explicit Sex, Anyone? in When Books Die (2006) ISBN 9780977567706
- Out of Town, in Meanjin vol.72 no1., (2013)

== Finlay Lloyd ==
Late in 2005, frustrated by the increasing commercialism of publishing, Davies co-founded Finlay Lloyd with Phil Day (artist), Ingeborg Hansen and Robin Wallace-Crabbe. The intention of the press was to encourage the writing larger publishers were too risk averse to support. From 2010 Davies and Day continued the press as the two remaining founders, Day concentrating on the setting and design of the books, and Davies on their editing, publicising and distribution.

== Collaboration ==
Davies and Phil Day have collaborated on books since 2008. Their first collaboration being Cat's eye (2008), a short story by Davies, with copper engravings by Day. Their most recent collaborations are the "tangentially related" novels Crow Mellow (2014) and Call Me (2018). Dorothy Johnston, Sydney Morning Herald, wrote that:

"Crow Mellow is a sophisticated hybrid, a marriage of words and visual images, and it is this which most clearly sets the book apart ... Davies plus Day is a new creature entirely."

== The Left Hand ==
In 2010, Davies established the Left Hand in Braidwood, NSW. The premise behind the gallery was to establish a non-commercial model for art exhibition where artists felt encouraged and supported regardless of the extent of the sales of their work. His critical evaluation of the art world is contained an essay in Lost Art (another collaboration with Phil Day).

== Talks and Interviews ==
- Eroticism
- The Left Hand
- "Crow Mellow". smh.com.au. 11 October 2014.

== Miscellaneous ==
Davies has also worked as a volunteer in public education since 2005, running classes and workshops that encourage critical thinking.
