= Julian Davies =

Julian Davies may refer to:

- Julian Davies (author) (born 1954), Australian author
- Julian Davies (judoka) (born 1971), British judoka
- Julian Davies (microbiologist), British microbiologist
