= Finlay Press =

Private press (publisher) in NSW, Australia

Finlay Press is the name of an independent private press founded by Ingeborg Hansen and Phil Day. It began production in Goulburn, NSW, Australia in 1997. In 2001 the press moved to Braidwood, New South Wales, Australia, where it printed its final publication in 2009.

Two pages from 'Burly Gryphon' by Ingeborg Hansen with illustrations by Phil Day. (2007).

Woodcut by John Pratt for the cover of 'A Pile of Hair' by Julian Davies. (2003).

Hansen and Day were graduates of the Graphic Investigation Workshop, Australian National University, where they studied under Petr Herel and Peter Finlay. Herel, an advocate of the artist's book, Head lecturer of the Graphic Investigation Workshop, and founder of the Artist Book Studio, and Finlay, a compositor and printer by trade, both inspired Hansen and Day to continue making books after their graduation.

== Press name ==
Peter Finlay's name was chosen for their press name largely because of his lifelong involvement in letterpress printing, starting as an apprentice compositor, then working professionally as a printer, as a teacher of all aspects of book production in numerous technical colleges, and assisting other private press printers including Alec Bolton in the early days of Brindabella Press – a role in private press productions that Hansen and Day thought would otherwise be overlooked.

== Early history ==
Hansen and Day's first collaborative book was Imaginary Thoughts and Their Beings (1995), printed in the Graphic Investigation Workshop's Artists Book Studio (ABS) established by Herel (1994). Hansen supplied a prose poem while Day supplied eight etchings. Earlier books by Hansen were often experimental, unique copies using her own writing, some including textiles for pages, and mostly letterpress printed onto cheap coloured papers. Day's earlier books were more typical fine book productions utilizing tradition printmaking and letterpress techniques printed onto art papers. In 1996 Hansen and Day collaborated on a zine titled PAB (taking its name from the initials of the French poet Pierre Albert-Birot), and invited others to contribute to each issue. There were 3 issues in an edition of 100 each. In 1996 the Artists Book Studio was separated from the Graphic Investigation Workshop to make an independent studio space. Herel chose to stay with the Graphic Investigation Workshop. The ABS was renamed the Edition and Artist Book Studio (E+ABS) and was headed by Dianne Fogwell. The E+ABS employed Day as its first printer and binder. Hansen was also employed as a printer for some titles. By late 1996 Hansen and Day had started gathering equipment to found a press. By 1997 they had printed their first title Burly Gryphon, dedicated to ‘Peter and Petr’ (Finlay and Herel) under the press name Finlay Press.

== Press Contributors ==
Finlay Press set out to work with authors and artists domiciled in Australia. The press wanted to establish a close working relationship with its contributors. Some authors, such as Gary Catalano, Julian Davies, and Robin Wallace-Crabbe had more than one title published; Wallace-Crabbe also contributed as a visual artist to three book titles, one folio, and a broadsheet (see Bibliography, below).

G. W. Bot. 'Offerings' (1997).

== Yabber Yabber Publications ==
Yabber Yabber was the publishing arm of Finlay Press. The publishing arrangements were simple: Finlay Press supplied half the money for the edition, and the remaining contributors supplied the other half, making all contributors publishers of the title. The finances were used solely for covering the cost of paper, nothing else. Once the edition was completed Finlay Press retained half the edition and the remainder were divided equally among the contributors. Hansen and Day closed Yabber Yabber Publications to gain complete control over all aspects of each title knowing that this would allow them to create a house style and print larger runs.

== Early titles ==
Early titles from Finlay Press were printed in small runs ranging between twelve and thirty copies (with the exception of one title: The Seven Proses, which ran to two hundred copies). These early books were experimental in binding and layout, but were always true to the traditional notions of a book. Conscious of contemporary changes in paper, inks, bindings and printing techniques, Hansen and Day continued to find a way to a house style suitable for editions of over one hundred that was affordable on both money and time.

== Establishment of a house style ==
Slipcase with linocut by Robin Wallace-Crabbe for 'Light and Water' by Gary Catalano. (2002).

Later titles, editions between 25 and 150 copies, were printed and bound with a firm house style. Each publication used Magnani paper folded on the fore-edge, stitched with a Japanese binding and bound with a French false cover, then inserted into a slip case made from cardboard (usually a kraft stock). Some titles employed a concertina fold. Almost all titles were printed letterpress using hand-set Baskerville (with the exception of titling). The first title printed in the house style was Light and Water: Forty Prose Poems 1980-1999 (2002). Some of the later titles deviated from the house style to varying degrees. Two titles, I’ll Build You a Stairway to Paradise and Day by Day show the beginning of an abandonment of the house style. Day by Day was to be the last title published by Finlay Press.

== Finlay Lloyd ==
By 2005 Hansen and Day wanted to print lengthy prose, particularly fiction, in higher editions, but the practicalities of doing this with hand-set type was simply not possible due to time, and limited type stock. James Grieve approached Finlay Press with the possibility of printing a novel; using a linotype machine was the only possibility, but this didn't solve the problem of binding approximately 500 copies. The solution was to create a new publishing arm. Hansen and Day discussed these ideas with Julian Davies and Robin Wallace-Crabbe (two author/artists they had already collaborated with) and enthused by the idea of independent publishing they founded Finlay Lloyd. The name Finlay, again, came from Peter Finlay and was retained from Finlay Press, and Lloyd was the name of Davies's father, a man who had little interest in books. The first title, a collection of essays loosely discussing the fate of the book and literature titled When Books Die could be seen as a loose-fitting manifesto; it was released in 2006.

== Bibliography ==
=== Individual editions ===
Burly Gryphon (1997) - Ingeborg Hansen (prose) - Phil Day (etchings)

Hungry Magpies (1997) - Bernard Hardy (poetry) - Ingeborg Hansen (lino cut, wood engraving) - Phil Day (etchings)

Bomber (1997) - Emma Veal (poem) - Phil Day (etching)

Offerings (1997) - G. W. Bot (poem, lino cuts)

Fth (1998) - James Pollock (short story) - Ingeborg Hansen (lino cuts) - Phil Day (etchings)

The Last Lost Doughnut (1998) - Robin Wallace-Crabbe (play) - Ingeborg Hansen (typography) - Virginia Wallace-Crabbe (bichromate photographs) - Phil Day (lino cut paper masks)

Formingle (1998) - Craig Charlton (musical composition) - Kirsten Wolf (handmade paper) - Phil Day (etching)

Household: Eleven Poems (1998) - Gary Catalano (poems, lino cuts) - Robin Wallace-Crabbe (lino cuts) - Ingeborg Hansen (lino cuts) - Phil Day (lino cuts)

Jabberwocky (1998) - Julian McLucas

I, I Am, A Blind Man (1999) - Petr Herel (etchings)

The Seven Proses (2000) - Bernard Hardy (poems, wood engravings)

Pandora’s Cat (2000) - Robin Wallace-Crabbe (poem) - Ingeborg Hansen (typography) - Katie Clemson (lino cut)

Goodbye Eggcup (2006) - Phil Day (poetry, copper engraving, collograph)

=== House style editions ===
Light and Water (2002) - Gary Catalano (poetry) - Robin Wallace-Crabbe (etchings and lino cut)

A Pile of Hair (2003) - Julian Davies (short story) - John Pratt (etchings and woodcuts) - Phil Day (Monotypes)

Through Hoops (2005) - Gina Dow (poetry) - Robin Wallace-Crabbe (etchings) - Phil Day (copper engravings and linocut) - Ingeborg Hansen (wood engravings)

Familiar Objects (2005) - Phil Day (essay, lithography – some copies hand coloured)

Cat’s Eye (2008) - Julian Davies (short story) - Phil Day (copper plate engravings and monotype)

I’ll Build A Stairway To Paradise (2008) - Hartmann Wallis (poetry) - Phil Day (lithography)

Day By Day (2009) - James Grieve (translations of Pierre Albert Birot poems) - Phil Day (potato prints)

=== Print Folios ===
Top Ten Twentieth Century Monsters (2003) - Phil Day (lino cut, copper engraving, monotype)

Four Men and Their Ideas on the Erotic - Ingeborg Hansen (lino cut) - Robin Wallace-Crabbe (photo etching) - Robert Jones (lino cut) - Julian Davies (monotype) - Phil Day (copper engraving)

=== Broadsheet ===
An Egyptian - Hartmann Wallis (poem) - Robin Wallace-Crabbe (etchings)
