= The Swift Dark Tide =

2023 memoir by Katia Ariel

- Author: Katia Ariel
- Genre: Memoir
- Publisher: Gazebo Books
- Publication date: May 2023
- Publication place: Australia
- Pages: 230
- ISBN: 9780645633719

The Swift Dark Tide is a 2023 memoir by Katia Ariel. The book describes Ariel's experience of falling in love with another woman while in a long-term heterosexual marriage. The book was shortlisted for the 2024 Stella Prize.

== Reception ==
In a review published in The Saturday Paper, Linda Jaivin described the book as a "parade of lyrical fragments – sensual moments, family stories, ethical inquiries and daily records". Reviewing the book in Westerly, Fiona Wilkes described the book as "a marvel" and wrote that "each page is heavy with love for all parties and an awareness of the pain that often comes when one follows their heart". The judging panel of the Stella Prize wrote that the book was written in "delicate and delicious strokes" and that its subject was "no mid-life crisis...rather, it is a mid-life realising of desire and possibility; of queer becoming".

== Awards ==
Awards for The Swift Dark Tide
Year	Award	Category	Result	Ref.
2024	Stella Prize	—	Shortlisted	

== See also ==
- LGBTQ literature in Australia
