= James Grieve (Australian translator) =

Australian writer and translator (1934–2020)

James Alexander Grieve (14 November 1934 – 15 January 2020) was an Australian translator of French literature and an author. His translations have included scientific works, books for children and two volumes of Marcel Proust's À la recherche du temps perdu (ANU, 1982 and Penguin, London, 2002). Grieve's translated second part of Proust's 7-part Remembrance of Things Past is the first completely new English translation since the 1920s. There were six other translators working on the other parts, for this project by Penguin. Grieve's Penguin translation received positive review from Alain de Botton who remarked: "... if one ends up with a favourite [of the 7 volumes] (mine was James Grieve, who did Volume 2)." Grieve is also the author of the language study text Dictionary of Contemporary French Connectors (Routledge, London, 1996).

Grieve's translations have been illustrated by Petr Herel (Uncollected Works Press) and Phil Day (Finlay Press). Grieve is the author of three published novels (in English):

- A Season of Grannies (1987)
- They're Only Human (2001)
- Something in Common (2010)
- Swann's way, by Marcel Proust, New York : New York Review Books, 2023, ISBN 978-1-68137-629-5

Grieve also developed a text, deriving from his set of fiches correctives, which is now available to download as a PDF, entitled The One-Stop Fiche-Shop and its contents run over 3000 pages.

Grieve taught French language and literature at the Australian National University in Canberra.

Grieve died after a short illness on 15 January 2020, at the age of 85.
