= Robin Wallace-Crabbe =

- Born: 1938 (age 87–88); Melbourne
- Known for: Artist and writer

Robin Wallace-Crabbe (born 1938, Melbourne) has been actively involved in the Australian arts scene since the 1960s as a curator of exhibitions, literary reviewer, cartoonist, illustrator, book designer, publisher and a commenter on art. He is best known as a writer and visual artist where he has moved between the two mediums for over fifty years, having had thirteen novels published (either in Australia, the UK, and the USA), five under his own name, and eight under the pseudonym – Robert Wallace, and since the early sixties he has had numerous solo exhibitions in Australian capital cities. Including a Survey Exhibition held at the Australian National University in 1980. And another Survey Exhibition touring Australian Regional galleries across Australia between 1990 and 1991. Sasha Grishin describes him as ‘ … a brilliant draughtsman and colourist, his [pictures] experiment with ideas of levels of perception. The observer and the observed share a common, ambiguous space which opens up an intellectual dimension to the [pictures], where the witty and provocative gestures suggest further levels of interpretation.’

Robin Wallace-Crabbe Lovers at Port Macquarie. Oil on canvas. (1968)

== Painting and drawing ==
Wallace-Crabbe was in his early twenties when his paintings caught the attention of the art historian Bernard Smith. Smith described his paintings with: "Lovers of solitary nudes inhabit interiors … the feeling of something held in reserve". The solitary nude inhabiting interiors is a continuing theme in Wallace-Crabbe's art, in 2004 Wallace-Crabbe explained why:

One of my main pleasures when I'm drawing is talking to the model, just the exchange between two people … I don't want to produce those self-important drawings that once came out of art schools.

Evidence of Wallace-Crabbe conversing with the model is repeated throughout his art practice. In 1996 he received a Creative arts Fellowship at the Australian National University (ANU) where he produced a limited edition book titled Scratchings. The book includes a group of etchings each displaying portraits. Twelve of the thirteen portraits are professors at the ANU, including a portrait of John Passmore, accompanying them is a narrative essay by Wallace-Crabbe describing the conversations he had while talking to each sitter for their portrait. Conversing with the model while drawing is also evident in chapter seven 'In the Shade of Young Maidens' of his autobiography A Man's Childhood (1997). In 2003 a collection of charcoal drawings of his many models was exhibited at the Queen Victoria Building, Sydney, the exhibition was accompanied with a book ‘Conversations and Portraits’ written by himself and including pieces written by some of his models. And in 2004 the publication ‘Studio: Australian Painters on the Nature of Creativity’ Wallace-Crabbe can be seen in his Canberra studio observing and painting the nude model. Art historian and critic, John McDonald, suggests the continuing theme of the nude and the interior has to do with pleasure, rather than conscious art making.

‘[Wallace-Crabbe] thinks of art as a private pleasure. If artists don’t find pleasure in their studios he argues that it is because they are not focused on making art, but on a business called ‘being an artists.’

Rather than ‘being an artist’, as McDonald suggest, Gary Catalano argues that Wallace-Crabbe is in search of the primal psychological aspects of picture making, ‘… Wallace-Crabbe wants to recapture something of the freshness of perception that comes naturally to children when they are first exposed to the external world.’.

== Novels ==
Wallace-Crabbe's literary career began in 1978 with the publication of Feral Palit.

"[Feral Palit] was published without any notice at all and then it suddenly got a very good review in The National Times. Then about three months later Geoffrey Dutton gave it a very good review, mentioning that I think Patrick White and David Campbell had drawn his attention to it."

Patrick White's fondness for Feral Palit formed a correspondence between White and Wallace-Crabbe.

- Feral Palit (1978) ISBN 978-0732225162
- Goanna (1982) ISBN 0949559016
- Australia, Australia (1989) ISBN 0732225523
- Dogs (1993) ISBN 0207177368
- A Man's Childhood (1997) ISBN 1875892532
- ISLANDS (2000) ISBN 1876827076
- CONVERSATIONS and PORTRAITS ISBN 0646425366

=== Under the pseudonym Robert Wallace ===
- To Catch a Forger (1988) ISBN 0575046007
- An Axe to Grind (1989) ISBN 0312050542
- Pay Day (1989) ISBN 0207175667
- Paint Out (1990) ISBN 0575048999
- Flood Rain (1991) ISBN 0207168989
- Finger Play (1991) ISBN 0575049022
- Art Rat (1993) ISBN 0732249899
- The Forger (2003) ISBN 1876631821

=== Under the pseudonym Hartmann Wallis ===
- When Books Die (2006) ISBN 9780977567706
- I'll Build A Stairway To Paradise (illustrated by Phil Day (artist)) (2008) Finlay Press artist's book
- Who said what, exactly (with drawings by Phil Day (artist)) (2016) ISBN 9780994516510

Between 2008 and 2016, Wallace-Crabbe occasionally wrote essays and poems using the name 'Hartmann Wallis'. Finlay Lloyd publishers explain:

Hartmann Wallis, [...] has a wild and somewhat incestuous relationship with the well-known author and artist Robin Wallace-Crabbe.

Through Hartmann, Wallace-Crabbe mused on various reoccurring subjects: art, love/lust, loneliness and animals; usually with a tone of disdain regarding cruelty toward animals and our fellow man. Wallace-Crabbe also composed a short biography (under the name R. C. Brace) for Hartmann. The short biography claims Hartmann spent much of his life living in either Australia, or in an outsider community in remote Northern Canada. Living out the latter yet years of his life in a 'wigwam' on the banks of the Yarra River in Melbourne.

Adam Collier (playwright), of Toronto, composed a monologue titled My friend Rodney. Collier wrote the monologue under the pretence that he and Hartmann had had many conversations. Collier explains:

... I got to know Hartmann while he lived on Parliament Street in Toronto. We would meet most days at a coffee shop, and talk about art, everyday life, and Australian football (what he called ‘footy’). I haven’t spoke to Hartmann since he moved to the Yukon.

Hartmann's poems were describe by Peter Keneally as:

"... a glorious romp or rant, ranging across history, the minutiae of surburbia, and acerbic view of the literary and artistic world."

Robin Wallace-Crabbe cover design for 'Gardening for Australians'.

== Book design, illustration, and publishing ==
Wallace-Crabbe has been involved in the writing, illustrating, designing, and publishing of books for almost fifty years. He designed the cover for the Penguin Publication of R. T. M. Pescott's 'Gardening for Australians' (1965); he also designed books covers for Melbourne University Press (Melbourne) including Vincent Buckley's 'Arcady and Other Places' (1966). Later Wallace-Crabbe collaborated with three presses on the production of limited edition books: 'Elegies: Nine Poems' Brindabella Press (1976); 'Scratchings: a brief account of interloping with a pristine etching plate in hand and other matters' The Edition and Artists Book Studio (1996); and seven titles with Finlay Press (1998-2009).
