= Catherine Rey =

French writer

- Born: 1956 (age 69–70); Saintes, Charente-Maritime, France
- Occupation: Writer
- Writing career
- Language: French, English
- Genre: Novel
- Notable works: L'Ami intime (novel, 1994); Ce que racontait Jones (novel, 2003); Une femme en marche (novel, 2007); The Lovers (novel, 2018); Lisette (a tribute to Lisette Nigot, 2024)

Catherine Rey, born in 1956 at Saintes, in Charente-Maritime, is a French writer.

== Biography ==
After studying literature in Bordeaux and before devoting herself fully to writing, Rey worked for several years as a teacher of French literature. In 1997, she left her work to settle in Perth, Western Australia, where her father was born in 1918. Her paternal grandparents had emigrated to Australia in 1912. She lived in Perth for eight years before returning to Charente-Maritime in 2006. She returned to Australia in 2008 and currently lives in Illawarra.

Rey graduated from the University of Bordeaux III with a CAPES degree in Modern Literature. She also holds a PhD from the University of Western Australia. Her dissertation, The New Babel, deals with language, identity and moral in the works of Emil Cioran, Milan Kundera and Andrei Makine. Rey analyses how these three writers have abandoned their original language to adopt French in their creative work. Rey is the author of several novels and short stories. Highly noticed by critics and booksellers right after the launch of her first novel L'ami intime published in 1994 by Le Temps qu'il fait, she was selected as a finalist for the 1995 Prix Femina for a First Novel. Continuing her exploration of the dark and sordid side of humanity, she published Les jours heureux and Eloge de l'oubli over the next two years. She published Lucy comme les chiens in 2001. Rey takes the reader through the painful journey of an intellectually disabled young woman who, despite the beatings and humiliations of an abusive mother and an abusive old man, remains loving and faithful.

In 2003, her novel, Ce que racontait Jones, published by Phébus, received the Thyde Monnier scholarship from the Société des gens de lettres, and was shortlisted for the prestigious Prix Renaudot literary award and the Prix Femina literary award that same year.

In 2007, Rey published Une femme en marche, an autobiographical novel in which she confronts her mother and her family's past.

In September 2010, she published Les extraordinaires aventures de John Lofty Oakes, a novel that retraces the heroic quest of a man of small size but possessing the gift of crying tears of gold in the style of a philosophical tale and an epic. Being the object of all desires for fortune that flows from his eyes, this Tom Thumb-esque figure embarks on a journey that takes him from Guildford, Western Australia, where he was born, to Panaji, a city on the West coast of India, passing through Fiji, before finally returning to his homeland.

In 2011, Rey published Plus calme que le sommeil, a meditation on death in the form of a long love letter.

In 2018, she published The Lovers, her first novel in English. In The Sydney Morning Herald, author and critic Catherine Ford described it as a "timely and sophisticated thriller". In 2024, she published Lisette, a tribute to fellow French friend Lisette Nigot. In The Sydney Morning Herald, awarded author and critic Steven Carroll described it as a "moving, deeply thoughtful meditation on youth, ageing and death. Impressively crafted."

== Work ==
Novels in French :

- L’Ami intime, Le temps qu’il fait, 1994 (ISBN 2-86853-183-0)
- Les jours heureux, Le Temps qu’il fait, 1995 (ISBN 2-86853-210-1)
- Eloge de l’oubli, Le temps qu’il fait, 1996 (ISBN 2-86853-257-8)
- Lucie comme les chiens, Le temps qu’il fait, 2001 (ISBN 2-86853-342-6)
- Ce que racontait Jones, Phébus, 2003 (ISBN 2-85940-924-6)
- Une femme en marche, Phébus, 2007 (ISBN 978-2-7529-0288-7)
- Les extraordinaires aventures de John Lofty Oakes, Joëlle Losfeld Publishing, 2010 (ISBN 978-2-07-078786-9)
- Plus calme que le sommeil, Le Temps qu’il fait, 2011 (ISBN 978-2-86853-562-7)

Novels translated into foreign languages :

In English :

- The Spruiker's Tale (Ce que racontait Jones), Andrew Riemer, Giramondo (Australian Edition), 2005 (ISBN 978-1-920882-07-5)
- Stepping Out, Translation: Julie Rose, Giramondo (Australian edition), 2008 (ISBN 978-1920882389)

In German :

- Was Jones erzählt (Ce que racontait Jones), Translation: Claudia Kalscheuer, Unionsverlag (German edition), 2005 (ISBN 978-3293003477)

Novel in English :

- The Lovers, Edited by Gazebo Books, Sydney, 2018, (ISBN 9780987619112)
- Lisette, Edited by Gazebo Books, Sydney, 2024, (ISBN 9780645920994)

Beautiful books

- Memoires d'un vignoble, photographs by Jean-Luc Chapin, Éditions la Part des Anges, 1998 (ISBN 2-912882-00-1)

Articles and essays

- How Do The Salamanders die? Essay, 2005, Heat n.9, Giramondo, Sydney.
- Do You Still Write? Essay, 2011, In Australian Journal of French Studies, Volume XLVIII, Number 3, 2011, University of Sydney.
- To Make A Prairie It Takes a Clover and a Bee, Essay, 2013, In Joyful Strains, an anthology published by Affirm Press, Melbourne.
- Jean Mariotti, Six poems, translation, 2013, In Cordite Journal on line, Kent Mc Karthy, editor.

== Adaptation for the stage ==
In 2010, the director Valérie Goma adapted for the Lucy theater as the dogs, repositioning the world of Catherine Rey's little heroine in the context of a multicultural and multilingual Guiana plateau, where many questions of identity related migrations of populations. Created in Cayenne under the title of Lucy, the play will tour the region (in Guyana, Suriname and Brazil) and Guadeloupe, before being presented in 2011 at the Chapel of the Word Incarnate as part of the Festival off of Avignon.

== Awards ==
- 1995 : L'ami intime selected for the Femina Prize of the first novel.
- 1995 : L'ami intime Prix Fureur de Lire from the City of Cherbourg.
- 1995 : L'ami intime Prix of the first novel at the Chambéry Festival.
- 1996: Eloge de l’oubli Prix des Mouettes from the Regional Council of Charente-Maritime.
- 2001: Lucie comme les chiens Book Award of Poitou-Charente.
- 2003 : Ce que racontait Jones, shortlisted for the Renaudot, Voted winner in the first round of voting.
- 2003 : Ce que racontait Jones shortlisted for the Femina.
- 2003 : Ce que racontait Jones awarded by the Thyde Monnier Scholarship of the Société des Gens de Lettres.
- 2005 : The Spruiker's Tale Longlisted for the International IMPAC, Dublin.

== See also ==
- List of French-language authors
