= Cassandra Atherton =

Australian writer

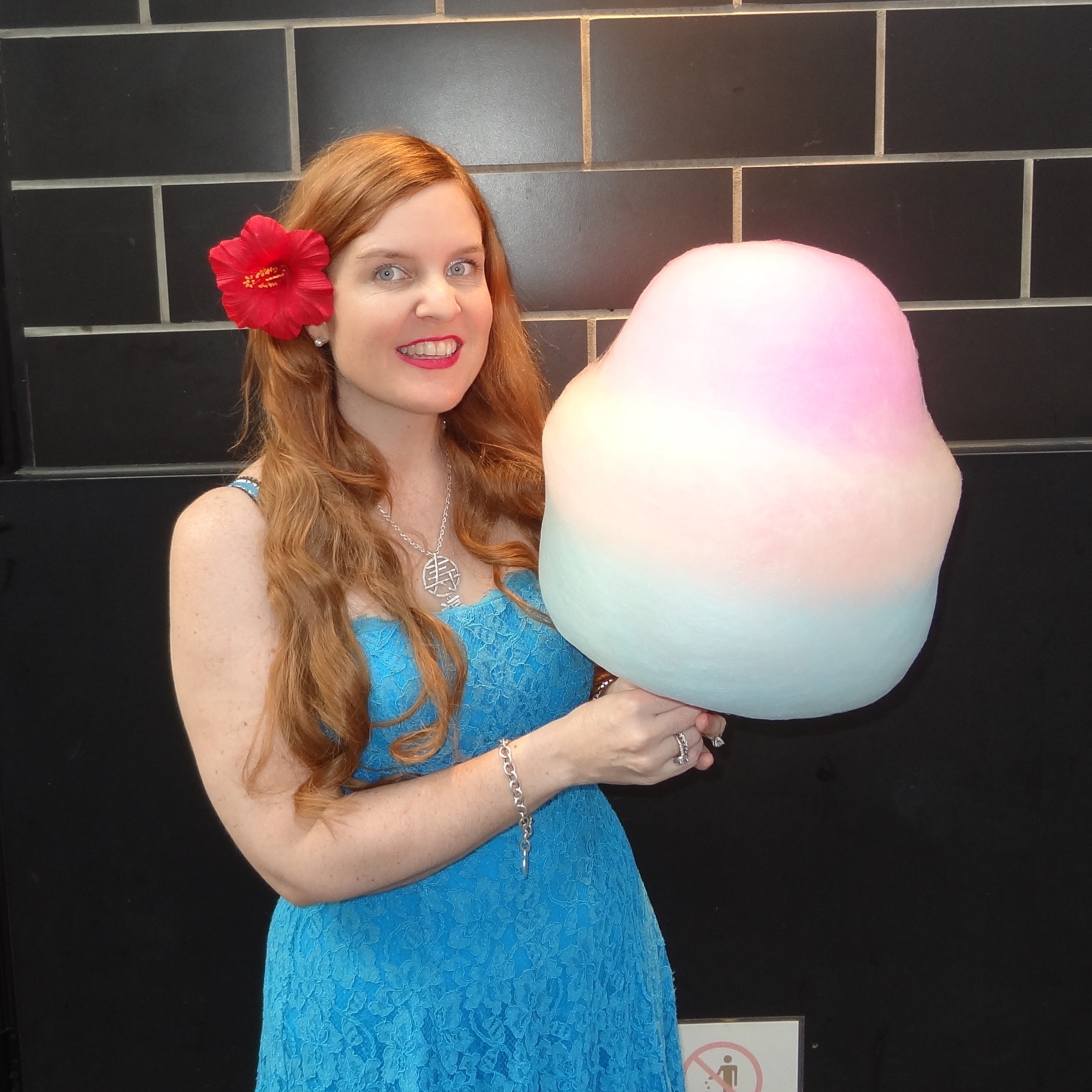
- Atherton in Tokyo, 2016
- Born: Rose Park, Adelaide
- Education: University of Melbourne
- Known for: Prose poetry; Ekphrastic poetry; Dark poetry (including poetry on the atomic bomb); Ballophrasis

Cassandra Atherton is an Australian prose-poet, critic, and scholar. She is one of the leading international experts on prose poetry. She is also renowned for her work in the scholarly field of ekphrastic poetry and is celebrated for coining the terms dark poetry—for poetry that attempts to reanimate a dark event, and ballophrasis—for works based on dance. She is married to historian Glenn Moore.

Cassandra has her own publishing imprint, FarFlung Press, at MadHat Press in the US and is Dispatches editor for The Fortnightly Review, UK.

== Academic and literary work ==
Atherton completed her Bachelor of Arts (Honours in English and History), Master of Arts, Graduate Diploma of Education, and PhD at The University of Melbourne. She was supervised by Australian poet, Chris Wallace-Crabbe.

She was Harvard Visiting Scholar in English in 2015–16, sponsored by Stephen Greenblatt, a visiting fellow at the Institute of Comparative Culture at Sophia University, Tokyo, in 2014, and an affiliate of the Japan Studies Centre at Monash University from 2015. She was an editorial advisor for Australian Book Review in 2012–15 and Poetry Editor of Westerly Magazine. She is now Commissioning Editor for Westerly (magazine) and Series Editor of Microlit Anthologies for Spineless Wonders.

Her prose-poetry has been widely anthologised in publications such as The Best Australian Poems (2012, 2013, 2014, 2015, 2017), the Hunter Anthology of Contemporary Australian Feminist Poetry (2016), the International Prose Poetry Project's anthologies Seams (2015), Pulse (2016) and Tract (2017) and Strange Cargo: Five Australian Poets published by Smith/Doorstop in the UK. Her prose poetry has been published in international journals, including New Orleans Review, Fortnightly Review, The Ekphrastic Review, Stoneboat Literary Journal, Wisconsin, Stride Magazine, United Kingdom, and Scrivener Creative Review, Montreal. Readings of her poetry are collected on Penn Sound.

Atherton was a judge of the Australian Book Review's Elizabeth Jolley Short Story awarding 2014; the Victorian Premier's Literary Awards: Prize for Poetry in 2015 and 2016, the joanne burns microlit award from 2016 - 2024, and Melbourne's Lord Mayor's Poetry Prize in 2016 and 2017.

She has been awarded many grants and prizes, including VicArts Grants, Australia Council Grants, and Australian-Korean Foundation Grant (2016) [with Jessica L. Wilkinson and Dan Disney] and the Felix Meyer Fellowship. She received the University of California, Davis Mary Schroeder Award for her interview with Howard Zinn, the non-fiction Sanlane prize (United States) for In So Many Words and a Blanc Literary Prize (United Kingdom) for The Man Jar.

She is currently a Distinguished Professor in Writing and Literature at Deakin University where she received the Vice-Chancellor's Award for University Teacher of the Year. She is currently Associate Head of School (Research).

In 2017, Cassandra and Paul Hetherington signed an advance contract with Princeton University Press to write a book on prose poetry, which was published in 2020. In 2023, they signed with Princeton University Press to write a book on ekphrastic poetry.

William Carlos Williams was a genius. And he has my lover’s initials. Or rather my lover has his initials. I often eat the plums that were in the fridge. But I don’t expect to be forgiven. Not everything depends upon that. Or the wheelbarrow of promises that still lies at the bottom of his heart.

— Cassandra Atherton, 2015. Plum(b).

=== Themes ===
Atherton's prose poetry explores the reanimation of canonical texts against a backdrop of popular culture references. She appeals to humour noir and the politicisation of the poet's private spaces. Geoff Page writes: "Though many of the poems are anecdotal they also advance by sound associations and other aleatory devices. They tend to be seriously playful with a bent towards the satirical, even the self-mocking."

=== Critical response ===
Atherton is praised for her prose poetry, and is likened to masters of the form. Michael Farrell writes: "Cassandra Atherton’s nervy style is distinct from an earlier generation of prose poets (Joanne Burns, Gary Catalano, Ania Walwicz); it feels both post-punk and post-John Forbes." While others, such as Chloe Wilson, have praised her for exploring the fundamental question of any poet: "They are works in which the speaker, moving back and forth between text and experience, continually asks an unanswerable question: 'How do I write the space between my heart and my pen?'" While Atherton's prose poetry is informed by previous poets and investigates the anxiety of the artist, Ivy Ireland has observed dark humour in her collection of prose poetry, Exhumed: "Dazzling, vibrant and terribly witty, ... Exhumed does not give itself over entirely to the horribly serious, gruesome images invoked by its title." Australian writer Kerryn Goldsworthy notes in a critique of Atherton's Trace (2015) that "The dense, intense prose is often funny, and incorporates all kinds of cultural allusions."

"It seems that for Atherton experience can excavate uncanny resonances; for this writer-as-reader, the canon perhaps acts as a repository of thematic models, patterns, and ideals as if a searchable archive reconstituted in this book in a mode Majorie Perloff terms elsewhere (and in other contexts) as récriture. If these texts are indeed expressions of desire, as [Lisa] Gorton asserts, then here is a poet ventriloquizing a pantheon of archetypes in order to extend fragmentarily and formally into narrative, her catharses presented as participatory and multi-vocal prose-like inventions".

— Dan Disney, Antipodes, vol. 30, issue. 1, June 2016, pp. 236-7.

== Collaboration ==
Atherton most often collaborates with artist and writer Phil Day and scholar and poet, Paul Hetherington. She is currently engaged in collaborating on Sketch Notes 4 and 5 with Day and a series of artist's books with both Hetherington and Day.

She was awarded a VicArts Grant (2016) to collaborate on writing a prose poetry graphic novel with Day and scholar/poet Alyson Miller, titled Pika-don.

== Bibliography ==
=== Critical Works ===
- Prose Poetry: An Introduction, with Paul Hetherington, Princeton University Press, NJ (2020).
- The Unfinished Atomic Bomb: Shadows and Reflections (New Studies in Modern Japan), David Lowe, Cassandra Atherton and Alyson Miller, eds. Lexington Books, Maryland, (2018)
- Travelling Without Gods: A Chris Wallace-Crabbe Companion, Cassandra Atherton (ed.), Melbourne University Press, Melbourne (2014) ISBN 9780522864519.
- In So Many Words: Interviews with Writers, Scholars and Intellectuals (interviews with American intellectuals: Harold Bloom, Noam Chomsky, Stephen Greenblatt, Camille Paglia, Howard Zinn, et al.), Australian Scholarly Publishing, Melbourne (2013) ISBN 9781925003062.
- Flashing Eyes and Floating Hair: A Reading of Gwen Harwood's Pseudonymous Poetry (2007) ISBN 1740971299.
- Intersections: Gender and History, Cassandra Atherton (ed.), Melbourne University Press, Melbourne (1997) ISBN 0732515467.

=== Novels ===
- The Man Jar, Printed Matter Press, Tokyo (2010).

=== Prose-poetry ===
- Salty, in 'Five Tastes, Authorised Theft', Recent Work Press, Canberra (2022). [Chapbook]
- The Heroic Age, in 'Five Ages, Authorised Theft', Recent Work Press, Canberra (2021). [Chapbook]
- Post-Raphaelite, in 'C19, Authorised Theft', Recent Work Press, Canberra (2020). [Chapbook]
- Leftovers, Gazebo Books, Potts Point (2020).
- Fugitive Letters, Recent Work Press, Canberra (2020) with Paul Hetherington.
- Touch, in 'The Six Senses, Authorised Theft', Recent Work Press, Canberra (2019). [Chapbook]
- Pre-Raphaelite: and other prose poems, Garron Publishing, Adelaide (2018).
- Pika-Don [with Phil Day and Alyson Miller], Mountains Brown Press, Melbourne (2017).
- Yellow, in 'Colours', Recent Work Press, Canberra (2017). [Chapbook]
- Dilly Dally and Moon, [concertina books] Mountains Brown Press, Victoria (2016), with Phil Day (artist) and Paul Hetherington (poet). [Artist's book]
- The Taoist Elements: Water, International Poetry Studies Institute: Recent Work Press, Canberra (2016). [Chapbook]
- Sketch-Notes Vol. (1, 2 & 3), Mountains Brown Press, Victoria (2015), with Phil Day (artist), [Artist's book].
- Exhumed, Grand Parate Poets, New South Wales (2015) ISBN 9780987129192.
- Trace, Finlay Lloyd, New South Wales (2015), illustrated by Phil Day (artist) ISBN 9780987592996.
- Pegs, International Poetry Studies Institute: Authorised Theft, Canberra (2015). [Chapbook]
- After Lolita, Ahadada Books, Ontario (2010).

=== As editor ===
- Remnant: An Anthology of Microlit, Spineless Wonders, Sydney (2024).
- Play: An Anthology of Microlit, Spineless Wonders, Sydney (2023).
- Dreaming Awake: New Contemporary Prose Poetry from the United States, Australia, and the United Kingdom (with Peter Johnson (poet)), MadHat Press, USA (2023).
- Alcatraz (with Paul Hetherington), Gazebo Books, Sydney (2022).
- The Language in My Tongue: An Anthology of Australian and New Zealand Poetry (with Paul Hetherington), MadHat Press, USA (2022).
- Travel: An Anthology of Microlit, Spineless Wonders, Sydney (2022).
- Pulped Fiction: An Anthology of Microlit, Spineless Wonders, Sydney (2021).
- Memory Book: Portraits of Older Australians in Poetry and Watercolours (with Jessica Wilkinson), Hunter Publishers, Brisbane (2021).
- The Anthology of Australian Prose Poetry, Melbourne University Press, Melbourne (2020).
- Scars: An Anthology of Microlit, Spineless Wonders, Sydney (2020).
- Shuffle: An Anthology of Microlit, Spineless Wonders, Strawberry Hills (2019).
- Time: An Anthology of Microfiction and Prose Poems, Strawberry Hills, NSW: Spineless Wonders (2018).
- Landmarks: An Anthology of Microfiction and Prose Poems, Strawberry Hills, NSW: Spineless Wonders (2017).
- Cordite Poetry Review (with Paul Hetherington) (2016).
- Rabbit: A Journal of Nonfiction Poetry,(with Paul Hetherington) (2016).
- Contemporary Women’s Writing, (with Jessica Wilkinson) (2016).
- Axon: Creative Explorations, (with Antonia Pont) (2016).
- Media International Australia, (with David Marshall) (2015).
- Mascara Literary Review (2014).
- Ekleksographica (2010).
