= G. W. Bot =

Australian artist (born 1954)

- Born: Christine Falkland; 1954; Quetta, Pakistan
- Spouse: Sasha Grishin
- Website: gwbot.net

G. W. Bot is the signature name for the Australian artist Christine Grishin, nee Christine Falkland, who has been a full-time artist for more than 30 years. She is a printmaker, sculptor, painter and graphic artist who works with her own shapes and glyphs to represent the landscapes she loves. Since 1985 her primary work is linocut printing. She is known nationally and internationally from about 50 solo exhibitions, and more than 200 mixed, group exhibitions. Her work is held in more than 100 art collections including: the National Gallery of Australia; the British Museum; The Victoria and Albert Museum, London; the Bibliotheque National, Paris; The Museum of Modern Art, Osaka, Japan; and the Fogg Museum at Harvard University in Cambridge, Massachusetts.

== Biography ==
Bot was born 1954 in Quetta, Pakistan, of Australian parents, and later travelled widely with them. She studied art in London, Paris and Australia and graduated from the Australian National University in 1982. She has had residencies at Bundanon and Riversdale, NSW, properties Arthur Boyd left to Australians.

Bot lives in Canberra surrounded by gardens and views into bush land, which inspire the shapes and glyphs that define her work. She has a studio at the Strathnairn Arts Association in Holt, ACT.

Like many female artists who have experienced motherhood, Bot felt isolation when the children were young. Her choice of linocuts facilitated working on a kitchen table, and she expanded her skills and scope of work during this domestic period. She also loves poetry and draws on it for much of her work. She adopted the name G. W. Bot because she wanted a totem and there are many wombats on the property where she lives. The early French explorers recorded the name for the animal as le Grand Wam Bot and from this she derived G. W. Bot.

== Work ==
Bot has worked in many mediums: gouache and watercolour, oils and tempura, intaglio, lithography, and relief printing, but mainly linocut.

Bot has stated: “Like the unexplored and unmapped Australian landscape, the linocut is an unchartered medium without codified orthodoxies. It can detail a preciousness and intricate fragility like the spikes of a banksia or a vast monotony of tone.”

In the 1980s her works were figurative. But then in the 1990s Bot began to evolve the glyphs that represent for her the metaphysical and spiritual elements of landscape. She also began to use layering, and sometimes added collage or textiles to her works. For Bot the glyphs are a system of marks, a language, that have evolved from many rough sketches of the landscape.

Typically, Bot’s work features strong silhouettes, a natural colour palette, course visual texture and complex, rhythmic patterns and glyphs. These glyphs are symbols of natural elements.

She credits Aboriginal artist Rover Thomas with teaching her about black in the Australian landscape. After a fire, the black land bursts into bloom, so black is the colour not of death but of regeneration.

In 2013 Bot began to sculpt glyphs in steel and Treaty Glyphs (2013) and Glyphs – Between Worlds (201) and were shown in two separate exhibitions. She makes them from plain carbon steel. After cutting and smoothing the sculptures, she puts them into the ground to rust to a ruby-brown colour. They are then bolted to a backing, standing out slightly to cast their shadows.

== Ethos ==
During the COVID-19 pandemic (2020) she was interviewed at Strathnairn Arts Association in Canberra, ACT, Australia:

“What would you most like people to know about your Arts practice? "Art matters – art is a voice that reaches out to others so that they can see the world again as if for the first time. Like a child who sees the moon and is so overcome that they need to share the experience with others just in case we hadn’t ever seen the moon. In surreal times – like this COVID-19 pandemic – we all perhaps need to hear the voice of the child/artist for inspiration, for hope, for sanity and survival.“
