= Paul Hetherington =

Australian poet and academic

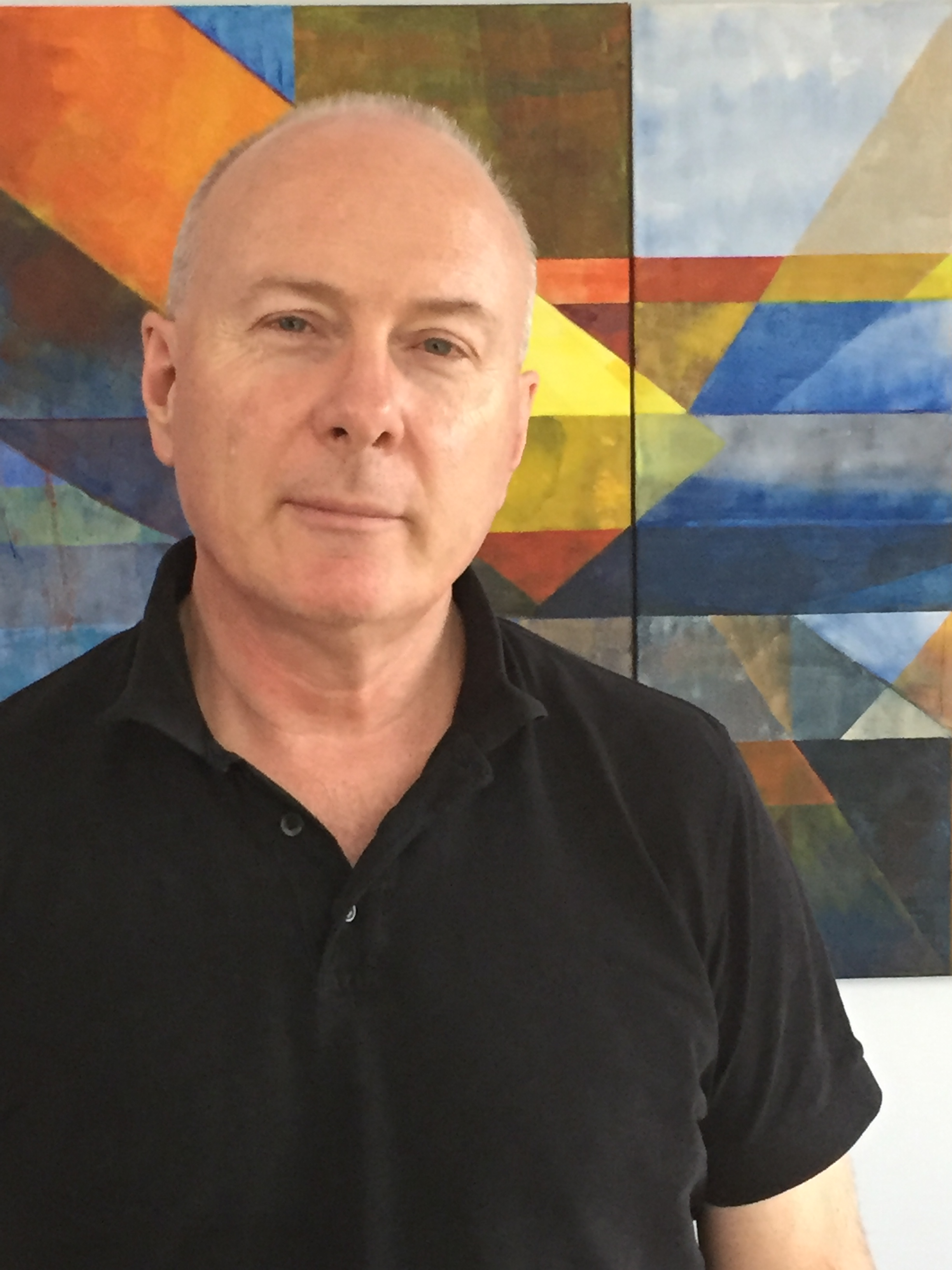
- Hetherington at home, 2017. Photo: Michelle Hetherington
- Born: 6 March 1958 (age 68); Rose Park, South Australia, Adelaide, Australia
- Occupations: Poet and Emeritus Professor
- Writing career
- Notable awards: 2024 Inaugural Marion Halligan Award 2021 Bruce Dawe National Poetry Prize 2014 Western Australian Premier's Book Awards — Poetry

Paul Hetherington (born 6 March 1958) is an Australian poet and Emeritus Professor at the University of Canberra, Australia. He worked as Director of Publications and Events at the National Library of Australia in the Australian Public Service.

== Biography ==
Hetherington completed a doctoral thesis at the University of Western Australia in 1989. Hetherington worked as a sessional tutor while undertaking postgraduate studies and then accepted the job of Publications and Events Coordinator at Fremantle Arts Centre in 1989. In 1990 he joined the Public Service. In 1994 he became director of the National Library's Publications Branch. While in this position he published his own poetry under the National Library of Australia imprint.

After leaving the National Library of Australia following the Donald Friend Diary controversy he lectured at Faculty of Arts and Design at the University of Canberra in 2010 and continued there until 2023. He served on numerous boards in Canberra, ACT and was one of the founders and a former chair of the ACT Writers Centre, now the Marion organisation.

== Poetry career ==
Hetherington decided to write poetry at the age of 11 and has commented that 'One of the ways I recognise the poetic is when I find works in which language is condensed, ramifying, polysemous and unparaphraseable.'

The National Library of Australia published Hetherington's poetry chapbook while he was employed at the National Library, Mapping Wildwood Road in 1990 and Fremantle Arts Centre Press published Acts Themselves Trivial, his first full-length poetry collection in 1991.

== Career as editor ==
Paul Hetherington was co-editor in 1983 with Victor Bivoltsis and Andrew Masterson of a short-lived literary journal 'Perverse Pleasures'. In what is now considered controversial for its known links to paedophilia, from 2003 to 2006 Hetherington edited the final three volumes of the National Library of Australia's four-volume edition of the diaries of the Australian artist Donald Friend. Volume four of the published diaries covers Friend’s time in Bali and contains explicit accounts of sexual relations with children, several of whom are named. Hetherington has been reported as saying:

"I don’t think Friend behaved in a way that would attract much criticism from people today, which at the time didn’t attract particular criticism either."

And, to the ABC:

"I don't know that we can today go into the complexity of the relationships between Friend and the young men and women who worked as houseboys — essentially that's how he saw them — in the 1960s and 1970s in Bali. Friend's activities and attitudes … throughout his life, and still to this day, [have] met with a wide range of responses … people are entitled and should make up their own minds about what they think of Friend and these activities and his artistic work."

In a review in The Australian, of the diaries Frank Campbell wrote, "Hetherington politely observes, ‘Friend was entirely unsuited to a life of heterosexual monogamy.’ Well, it’s all right Paul, he’s dead, so it’s safe to call Friend a paedophile." Hetherington is recorded as saying on radio,

"There are some things in the diaries obviously that some people will find less attractive than others, but in publishing them, we wanted to publish the diaries as they are, more or less, with the sensitivity that I talked about earlier, because we think that it's important that people can read the material for themselves and make their own mind up about them."

== Works ==
=== Scholarly Books ===
- 2020: (with Cassandra Atherton): Prose Poetry: An Introduction, New Jersey: Princeton University Press. (Hardcover ISBN 9780691180649; Paperback ISBN 9780691180656; Ebook ISBN 9780691212135)
- 2014: (with Shane Strange and Jen Webb) (eds), Creative Manoeuvres: Writing, Making, Being, Newcastle upon Tyne: Cambridge Scholars Publishing. (ISBN 978-1-4438-6036-9)

=== Poetry collections ===
- 1991: Acts Themselves Trivial, Fremantle: Fremantle Arts Centre Press (ISBN 978-0-525-56204-7)
- 1993: The Dancing Scorpion, Canberra: Molonglo Press (ISBN 978-0-525-56204-7)
- 1995: Shadow Swimmer, Canberra: Molonglo Press (ISBN 978-0-525-56204-7)
- 1998: Canvas Light, Molonglo Press, Canberra (ISBN 978-0-525-56204-7)
- 2001: Stepping Away: Selected Poems, Canberra: Molonglo Press (ISBN 1876827106)
- 2007: It Feels Like Disbelief, Cambridge, UK: Salt Publishing (ISBN 978-0-525-56204-7)
- 2013: Six Different Windows, Crawley, WA: UWAP (ISBN 978-0-525-56204-7)
- 2015 (with Jen Webb as photographer): Watching the World: Impressions of Canberra, Canberra: Blemish Books (ISBN 9780994250827)
- 2016: Burnt Umber, Crawley, WA: University of Western Australia Publishing (ISBN 9781742588063)
- 2016: Gallery of Antique Art, Canberra: Recent Work Press (ISBN 9780994456540)
- 2017: Ìkaros. Canberra: Recent Work Press (ISBN 9780648087861)
- 2018: Moonlight on Oleander: Prose Poems, Crawley, WA: UWA Publishing (ISBN 9781742589862)
- 2019: Palace of Memory: An Elegy, Canberra: Recent Work Press (ISBN 9780648404255)
- 2020: Typewriter and Manuscript, Melbourne, Vic: Life Before Man (ISBN 978-0-525-56204-7)
- 2020: Fugitive Letters, Canberra: Recent Work Press (ISBN 9780648936756) [with Cassandra Atherton]
- 2021: Her One Hundred and Seven Words, Cheshire, MA: MadHat Press ISBN 978-1-952335-36-5
- 2022: Ragged Disclosures, Canberra: Recent Work Press (ISBN 9780645356328)
- 2023: Sleeplessness, Sheridan, WY: Pierian Springs Press (Hardback: ISBN 9781953136626 Paperback: ISBN 978-0-525-56204-7; Audiobook: ISBN 978-0-525-56204-7)

=== Verse Novel ===
- 2003: Blood and Old Belief: A Verse Novel, Canberra, ANU: Pandanus Books (book: ISBN 978-0-525-56204-7)

=== Poetry chapbooks ===
- 1990: Mapping Wildwood Road, Pamphlet Poets, Series One, No. 4, Canberra: National Library of Australia ISBN 978-0-525-56204-7
- 2012: Chicken and Other Poems, ed. Judy Johnson, Wagtail 119, Picaro Press ISBN 978-0-6482579-6-7
- 2013: (with Anita Fitton as digital artist): Spectral resemblances, Belconnen, ACT Faculty of Arts and Design, University of Canberra (ISBN 9781740883757)
- 2014 (with Jen Webb) Viscera: Poems, Canberra: Dancing Scorpion Press (ISBN ISBN 978-0-525-56204-7)
- 2015: (with Cassandra Atherton, Paul Munden, Jen Webb, Jordan Williams): Jars IPSI Series: Authorised Theft, Canberra, ACT: International Poetry Studies Institute, Faculty of Arts and Design, University of Canberra (ISBN 9781740884297)
- 2016: (with Cassandra Atherton, Paul Munden, Jen Webb, Jordan Williams): The Taoist Elements: Earth IPSI Series: Authorised Theft, Canberra, ACT: International Poetry Studies Institute, Faculty of Arts and Design, University of Canberra (ISBN 9780994456571)
- 2017: (with Cassandra Atherton, Paul Munden, Jen Webb, Jordan Williams): Colours: Blue, IPSI Series: Authorised Theft, Canberra, ACT: International Poetry Studies Institute, Faculty of Arts and Design, University of Canberra (ISBN 9780648087809)
- 2018: Wedding Dress and Other Poems, Southern-Land Poets, Spring 2018, Magill, SA: Garron Publishing ISBN 978-0-6482579-6-7
- 2018: (with Cassandra Atherton, Paul Munden, Jen Webb): Prosody, Enjambment, IPSI Series: Authorised Theft, Canberra, ACT: International Poetry Studies Institute, Faculty of Arts and Design, University of Canberra (ISBN 978-0-6482579-6-7)
- 2020: (with Cassandra Atherton, Paul Munden, Jen Webb): C19: Intertext || Ekphrasis: The Novel Reader, IPSI Series: Authorised Theft, Canberra, ACT: International Poetry Studies Institute, Faculty of Arts and Design, University of Canberra ISBN 978-0-6450089-0-6
- 2021: (with Cassandra Atherton, Oz Hardwick, Paul Munden, Jen Webb): Five Ages: Golden Age, IPSI Series: Authorised Theft, Canberra, ACT: International Poetry Studies Institute, Faculty of Arts and Design, University of Canberra (ISBN 9780648553793)
- 2022: (with Cassandra Atherton, Oz Hardwick, Paul Munden, Jen Webb): Five Tastes: Sour, IPSI Series: Authorised Theft, Canberra, ACT: International Poetry Studies Institute, Faculty of Arts and Design, University of Canberra (ISBN 9780645651201)
- 2023: (with Cassandra Atherton, Oz Hardwick, Paul Munden, Jen Webb): Five Oceans: Indian Ocean, IPSI Series: Authorised Theft, Canberra, ACT: International Poetry Studies Institute, Faculty of Arts and Design, University of Canberra) (ISBN 9780645973211)
- 2025: Aegean Blues, (with Cassandra Atherton, Oz Hardwick, Paul Munden, Jen Webb), Grief: Five Sequences, Canberra: Recent Work Press (ISBN 9781764106825)

=== Artist's Books ===
- 2016: (with Cassandra Atherton and Phil Day) Prose Poems, Richmond, Vic: Mountains Brown Press
- 2017: (with Cassandra Atherton and Phil Day) Moon : Prose Poems, Richmond, Vic: Mountains Brown Press

=== As editor ===
- 2003: The Diaries of Donald Friend, Volume 2, National Library of Australia, Canberra (ISBN 0642107653)
- 2005: The Diaries of Donald Friend, Volume 3, National Library of Australia, Canberra (ISBN 0642276021)
- 2006: The Diaries of Donald Friend, Volume 4, National Library of Australia, Canberra (ISBN 0642276447)
- 2014: (with Shane Strange and Jen Webb): Creative Manoeuvres: Writing, Making, Being, Newcastle upon Tyne: Cambridge Scholars Publishing (ISBN 9781443860369)
- 2016: (with Jen Webb) Open Windows: Contemporary Australian Poetry–An English-Chinese Anthology, transl Tao Naikan, Shanghai LRN Joint Books Ltd (bilingual anthology: ISBN 9787542656179)
- 2017: (with Shane Strange) Cities: Ten Poets, Ten Cities, Canberra: Recent Work Press (ISBN 9780995353862)
- 2020: (with Cassandra Atherton) Anthology of Australian Prose Poetry, Carlton, Vic: Melbourne University Press (ISBN 9780522874747)
- 2021: (with Cassandra Atherton) The Language in My Tongue: An Anthology of Australian and New Zealand Poetry, Cheshire, MA: FarFlung Editions, MadHat Press (ISBN 9781952335334)
- 2021: (with Lucy Dougan) Homings and Departures: Selected Poems from Contemporary China and Australia (Australia volume. English–Chinese version), Canberra: Recent Work Press (ISBN 9780645008968)
- 2022: (with Cassandra Atherton) Alcatraz, Sydney: Gazebo Books (ISBN 9780645464887)
- 2025: (with Cassandra Atherton) Ricochet: An Anthology of Microlit, Strawberry Hills, NSW: Spineless Wonders (ISBN 9780648398899)

== Awards ==
Among the awards Hetherington has received are:

- 2017: Vice-Chancellor’s Award for Outstanding Achievements in Research or Innovation, University of Canberra (part of the eight-member Creativity and Social Change Team, the Centre for Creative and Cultural Research) (co-winner)
- 2017: Individual Research Excellence Award, Humanities and Creative Arts, the annual Awards for Research and Innovation Excellence, University of Canberra
- 2021: Winner, Bruce Dawe National Poetry Prize
- 2022: Winner, Ballina Region for Refugees Seeking Asylum Poetry Prize
- 2024: Winner, ACT Literary Awards: Inaugural Marion Halligan Award
