= Xavier Hennekinne =

French-Australian writer

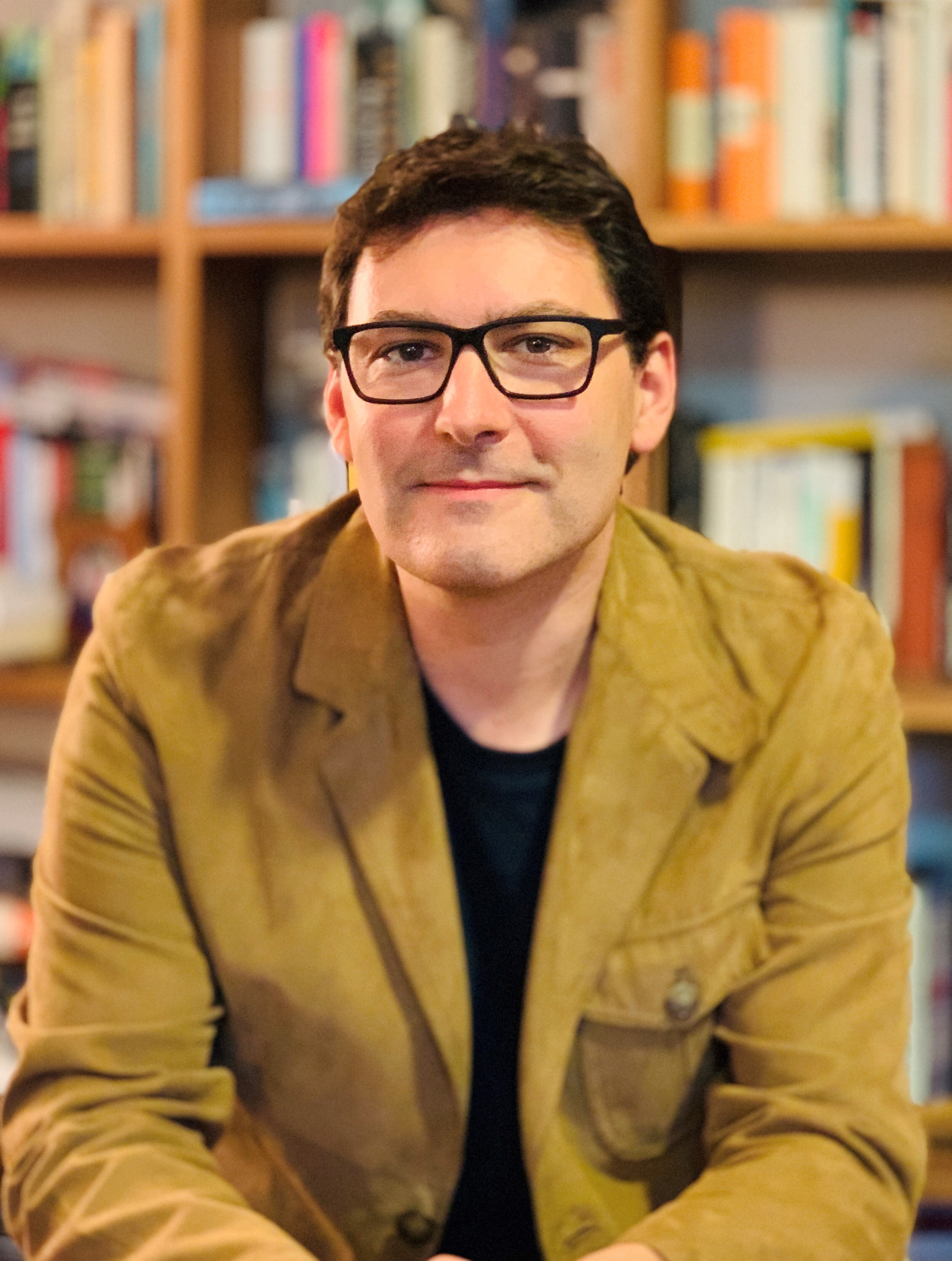
Xavier Hennekinne

Xavier Hennekinne (born 1973) is a French Australian writer, publisher and international aid and development professional.

== Early life and education ==
Born in 1973 in Meulan, France, Hennekinne grew up in the Parisian suburb of Achères and in Villiers-en-Désoeuvre in Normandy. Hennekinne attended a classe préparatoire aux grandes écoles in Caen before studying business administration at the Institut de Management International de Paris. He graduated from the University of Sydney with a Master of Arts in Peace and Conflict Studies in 2007.

== Career ==
Since 2005, Hennekinne has worked in the international aid and development sector. Between 2007 and 2012, he managed the global human resources services of the International Organization for Migration (IOM) at the Manila centre and acted as advisor at headquarters in Geneva. During his time at IOM, Hennekinne completed missions in many countries, most notably in Haiti after the 2010 earthquake, and in South Sudan. In 2012, he settled in Sydney, Australia.

Hennekinne is a co-founder of Sydney-based publisher Gazebo Books, which has been publishing works of literary fiction and non-fiction since 2018.

Hennekinne is the author of Lost Words (2019) and the novel Unequal Loves (2025).

He has also published essays and short stories in the Griffith Review, Kyoto Journal and Courant d'Ombres.

In an interview with Kate Holden for The Saturday Paper in January 2023, Hennekinne talks about the influence French philosopher Michel Serres has had on his work.
