= Petr Herel =

Australian artist

Petr Herel. 'I'll Be Your Mirror'. Three pen and ink drawings with perforation, unique book. (2004)

Petr Herel (19 May 1943 – 2 April 2022) was born in Czechoslovakia. He studied at the Prague College of the Visual Arts between 1957 and 1961. Later he studied the Prague Academy of Applied Arts where he received a Master of Arts. In 1971 he was awarded a scholarship by the French Government of Parts. In 1973 he moved to Australia. Herel is known for making, the not so easily distinguished, artist's books – "... an art form which he has pioneered in this country [Australia]."; an art form where Herel "... embraces the figurative and the abstract, transcends fashion, yet occupies a place which is concentrated in the graphic mediums of drawing, printmaking, and the livre d'artiste."

Herel died in Melbourne on 2 April 2022.

== Artists Books ==
The artist's book has allowed Herel to linger between the written word and the figurative image for more than three decades. In 1976 Franz Kempf remarked that Herel's images are " ... spontaneous in their conception, the final form crystallized in the intention to find harmony between the subconscious and the conscious, the real and the unreal." Kempf's statement could also describe the behaviour of the poet or a reader of poetry, which is arguably why Herel found himself making artist's books. Sasha Grishin, art historian, suggests that it is Herel's interest in literature (most notably in Czech, French, and English) that led Herel to make artists books: "The literary influence may serve as the initial point of departure for a very personal path of exploration." Grishin demarcates the 'personal' from more typical illustration suggesting that Herel is not only exploring the text, he is also exploring himself. Grishin isn't the only art historian to notice the 'personal' in Herel's books. Anne Gray, art historian, elaborates on this point: "[Herel’s books] are unique and intensely personal works,..." Gray's description might call a typical diary to mind, but she assures us this is not the case with Herel's books: "... although superficially similar to artists’ sketchbooks, [Herel's books] differ in that they were created with an idea of unity". Unlike an artists sketchbook or a diary, Herel's books are more conscious of what they are to contain, and how their contents will be delivered: "Herel’s books are blend of image and text, in which both have integrity and are enhanced by being placed together." As early as 1975, Elizabeth Cross identified Herel's inspiration coming from "... the work of Henri Michaux. ... [and] the less well known delicately evocative use of calligraphy in transforming figurative studies. They share a lyricism and spatial flexibility with many of Herel's works."

There have been two presses which Herel has made the majority of his titles under. Labyrinth Press which he co-founded with Thierry Bouchard in 1980, and Uncollected Works Press which Herel founded in 2007.

== Labyrinth Press ==
In 1980, Herel, who was then living in Canberra, Australia, co-founded Labyrinth Press with Thierry Bouchard in France. The last title from Labyrinth Press was in 2007. Bouchard's health resulted in their Labyrinth Press coming to an end. Bouchard died in 2008.

== Uncollected Works Press ==
In 1991, Herel had used the imprint 'Uncollected Works' for Ruth Cowen's 'Real Estates of the Heart'. In 2007, Herel produced the first title under Uncollected Works Press in Melbourne.

== The Graphic Investigation Workshop (and the Artist's Book Studio) ==
In 1979, he became the head lecturer of the Graphic Investigation Workshop (GIW) at the Canberra School of Art (renamed the Canberra Institute of Arts at the Australian National University in 1986). "[The Graphic Investigation Workshop] fostered an artistic sensibility coupled with a sense of technical excellence, rather than expertise in any given medium." An advocate of the artist's book he introduced his students to the book as a vehicle for graphic expression. In 1994, he co-founded the Artist's Book Studio with Peter Finlay. Herel designed the first major publication for the Artist's Book Studio – 'And Still I See' by Udo Sellbach (1995). In 1996, the studio was renamed the Edition and Artists Book Studio). In 1998, Herel retired from teaching and the GIW closed. In almost two decades the staff, students and visiting artists of the GIW created 246 artist's book titles, Herel presented the GIW collection of books to Australian National University, Canberra.

== Bibliography ==
=== Uncollected Works Press editions ===
Truth About Monsters: (Letter to a Visionary Engraver) (2007) – Text translation by James Grieve.

The Third Book of Gaspard de la Nuit. The night and its Wonders (2008)

Longing for the Earth (2008)

Poems and Days (2009) – Text translation by James Grieve.

Pascal Commère (2009) – Text translation by James Grieve.

The Nine Doors to your Body (2011)

Mlčeni (2011)

L’ Irréveillé (2011)

The Distant Present : Three Poems from ‘The Book of Epigrams’ (2011)

Bibliographie des livres imprimés en typographie de 1975 à 2006 par Thierry Bouchard sur ses presses de Losne. (2012)
