= Gary Catalano =

Australian poet and art critic (1947–2002)

- Born: 30 October 1947; Brisbane, Queensland, Australia
- Died: 8 December 2002 (aged 55); Melbourne, Victoria, Australia
- Occupations: Poet; art critic
- Spouse: Helen Hewitt (m. 1990)
- Writing career
- Notable awards: Grace Leven Prize for Poetry (1992)

Gary Catalano (30 October 1947 – 8 December 2002) was an Australian poet and art critic.

== Life ==
Calatano was born on 30 October 1947 in Brisbane. He married writer Helen Hewitt in 1990. Prominent amongst regular art critics for news periodicals, he wrote for The Age 1985–1990.

He died on 8 December 2002 in Melbourne.

== Awards ==
- 1992 Grace Leven Prize for Poetry (with Kevin Hart)
- 1997 Australia Council's Keesing Studio in Paris residency
- 2002 Harold White Fellowship from the National Library in Canberra

== Bibliography ==
=== Poetry ===
==== Collections ====
- Remembering the Rural Life. University of Queensland Press. 1978. ISBN 978-0-7022-1309-0.
- Heaven of Rags: Forty Poems, 1978-1981. Hale & Iremonger. 1982. ISBN 978-0-86806-021-7.
- Slow Tennis. University of Queensland Press. 1984. ISBN 978-0-7022-1775-3.
- Fresh Linen, sixty prose poems, 1980-1986. University of Queensland Press. 1988. ISBN 978-0-7022-2114-9.
- The Empire of Grass. University of Queensland Press. 1991. ISBN 978-0-7022-2321-1.
- Selected Poems 1973-1992. University of Queensland Press. 1993. ISBN 978-0-7022-2542-0.
- Household : eleven poems. Finlay Press. 1998.
- Jigsaw. Paper Bark Press, Craftsman House. 1999. ISBN 978-0-9586482-5-7.
- Light and Water. Finlay Press. 2002.
- New and Selected Poems, 1973-2002. Brandl & Schlesinger. 2006. ISBN 978-1-876040-87-1.
- The King of Clarity and Other Poems. Picaro Press. 2010.
- Collected Prose Poems. Gazebo Books. 2021. ISBN 978-0-6451-0305-2.

==== Selected list of poems ====
Title	Year	First published	Reprinted/collected
The cupboard	1998	Catalano, Gary (July 1998). "The cupboard". Jacket. 4.	
Sacred site	1998	Catalano, Gary (July 1998). "Sacred site". Jacket. 4.	
Thoughts	1998	Catalano, Gary (July 1998). "Thoughts". Jacket. 4.	
Translation	1995	Catalano, Gary (December 1995). "Translation". Quadrant. 39 (12): 61.	
Creek	1995	Catalano, Gary (December 1995). "Creek". Quadrant. 39 (12): 61.	

=== Short stories ===
- The Woman Who Lives Here and Other Stories. Champion Books. 1983. ISBN 978-0-908483-05-1.

=== Non-fiction ===
- The Years of Hope: Australian Art and Criticism, 1959-1968 1981
- The Bandaged Image: a study of artists' books 1983
- An Intimate Australia: The Landscape and Recent Australian Art 1985
- Catalano, Gary (December 1995). "Vivian Smith". Quadrant. 39 (12): 57–60.
- Building a Picture: Interviews with Australian Artists 1997
- The Solitary Watcher: Rick Amor and His Art 2001

=== Anthologies ===
- Peter Porter, ed. (1998). The Oxford Book of Modern Australian Verse. Oxford University Press. ISBN 978-0-19-550706-5.
- Martin Duwell; Bronwyn Lea, eds. (2003). "Arles". The Best Australian Poetry 2003. University of Queensland Press. ISBN 978-0-7022-3420-0.
- Thomas W. Shapcott, ed. (1998). "The Great Museum". The moment made marvellous: a celebration of UQP poetry. University of Queensland Press. ISBN 978-0-7022-3012-7.
- Cassandra Atherton; Paul Herrington, eds. (2020). Anthology of Australian Prose Poetry. Melbourne University Press. ISBN 978-0-5228-7474-7.
