= Sasha Grishin =

Australian art historian and art critic

Sasha Grishin AM FAHA
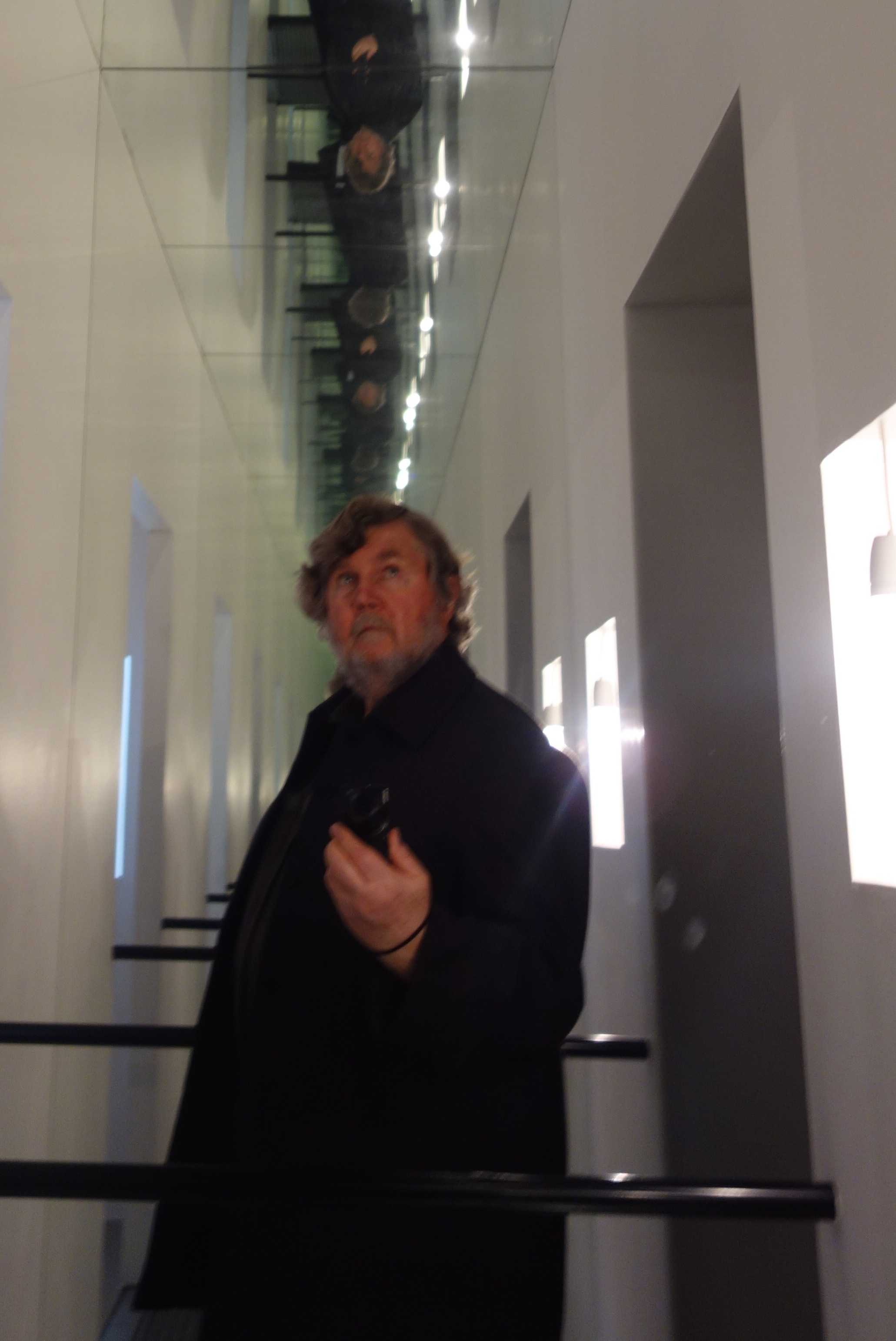
- Grishin at ARoS Museum, Aarhus, Denmark
- Born: Alexander Dmitrievich Grishin; Australia
- Education: University of Melbourne
- Occupations: Art historian, art critic, curator

Alexander "Sasha" Dmitrievich Grishin AM FAHA is an Australian art historian, art critic and curator based in Victoria and Canberra. He is known as an art critic, and for establishing the academic discipline of art history at the Australian National University (ANU).

== Early life and history ==
Grishin is the Australian-born child of Russian parents Dmitry Vladimirovich Grishin and Natalia Dmitrievna Luzgina, who arrived in Melbourne in September 1949. He studied art history at the University of Melbourne, State University of Moscow, London and Oxford.

== Career ==
Grishin established the academic discipline of art history in Canberra, when he founded the Fine Art Program at the Australian National University in 1977. In 1987 this program became the Department of Art History.

As curator, Grishin has been responsible for a number of exhibitions, including:

- Australian Sketchbook: Colonial Life and the Art of S.T. Gill, State Library of Victoria, 17 July – 25 October 2015, and subsequently shown at the National Library of Australia
- Baldessin/Whiteley: Parallel Visions, National Gallery of Victoria, Australia, Federation Square, Melbourne 31 August 2018 – 28 January 2019

He has written articles on Ken Tyler, Bruno Leti, William Robinson, Garry Shead, Wentja Morgan Napaltjarri, Ruth Faerber, Salvatore Zoffrea, Sydney Ball, Mandy Martin, Charles Blackman, Andrew Sibley, and many others.

In 1977 Grishin became senior art critic for The Canberra Times.

Grishin's professional archive is held at the National Library of Australia.

== Recognition and honours ==
Grishin was elected Fellow of the Australian Academy of the Humanities in 2004. In the 2005 Queen's Birthday Honours he was made a Member of the Order of Australia (AM) for "service to the visual arts and to contemporary Australian artists as an educator, critic and writer, and as an art historian".

In 2008, he was awarded a Citation for Outstanding Contribution to Student Learning from the Australian Learning and Teaching Council, for "the creation of innovative and vocationally orientated methods of teaching art history and curatorship".

A pencil portrait of Grishin by Andrew Sibley is held by the National Portrait Gallery in Canberra.

== Publications ==
Grishin has written on many art-related topics. Published titles include:

- Australian Art: A history
- John Wolseley: Land Marks III
- The Art of John Brack.
- A Pilgrim's Account of Cyprus: Bars'kyj's Travels in Cyprus,

== Personal ==
Grishin lives in Victoria and Canberra and is married to artist G.W. Bot.
