= Theatre of Japan =

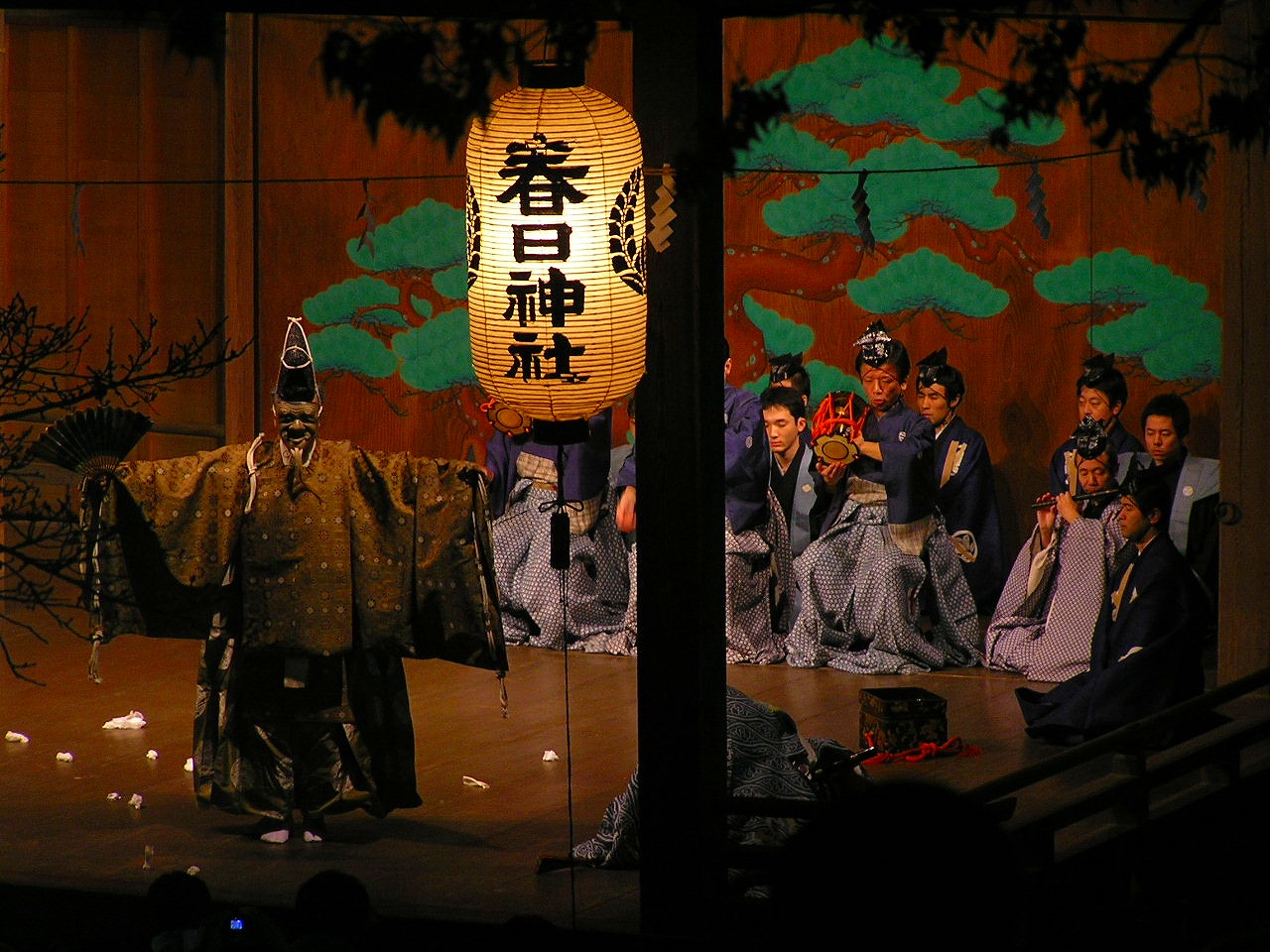
Noh is one of the four major types of Japanese theatre.

Traditional Japanese theatre is among the oldest theatre traditions in the world. Traditional theatre includes Noh, a spiritual drama, and its comic accompaniment kyōgen; kabuki, a dance and music theatrical tradition; bunraku, puppetry; and yose, a spoken drama.

Modern Japanese theatre includes shingeki (experimental Western-style theatre), shinpa (new school theatre) and shōgekijō (little theatre). In addition, there are many classical Western plays and musical adaptations of popular television shows and movies that are produced in Japan.

== Traditional forms of theatre ==
=== Noh and kyōgen ===
Noh and kyōgen theatre traditions are among the oldest continuous theatre traditions in the world. The earliest existing kyōgen scripts date from the 15th century. Noh was a spiritual drama, combining symbolism from Buddhism and Shinto and focusing on tales with mythic significance. Kyōgen, its comic partner, served as a link between the theological themes of the Noh play and the pedestrian world by using theatrical farce and slapstick. Noh theatre was generally performed for the elite aristocratic class, but there were occasions where Noh was also performed for common audiences. Noh and kyōgen plays were performed together in a series of nine, alternating between the two styles, with short kyōgen plays acting as interludes between the lengthy Noh plays.

Both men and women were allowed to perform kyōgen until 1430.

=== Kabuki ===
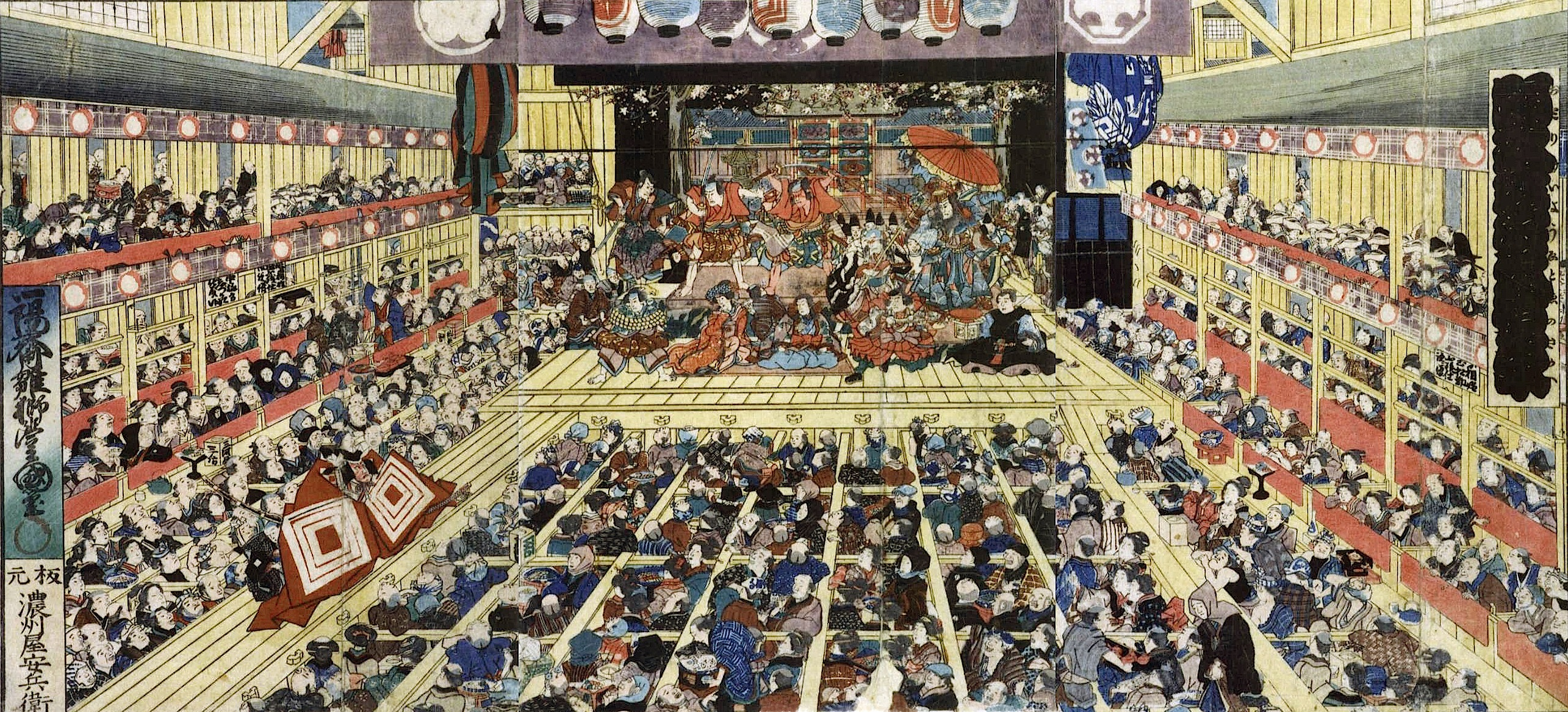
The July 1858 production of Shibaraku at the Ichimura-za theatre in Edo. Triptych woodblock print by Utagawa Toyokuni III.

Kabuki combines music, drama, and dance, often using period-accurate costumes and intense choreography. Types of kabuki play include jidaimono (historical plays) and sewamono ("contemporary" plays), as well as shosagoto ('dance-drama') plays primarily focused around set dance pieces. Styles of kabuki performance include aragoto ('rough style'), wagoto ('soft style') and onnagoto ('female style').

Kabuki developed out of opposition to the staid traditions of Noh theatre, a form of entertainment primarily restricted to the upper classes. Traditionally, Izumo no Okuni is considered to have performed the first kabuki play on the dried-up banks of the Kamo River in Kyoto in 1603. Like Noh, however, over time, kabuki developed heavily into a set art form, with importance given to preserving the integrity of certain plays, down to using the same costume designs used several centuries ago.

=== Bunraku ===
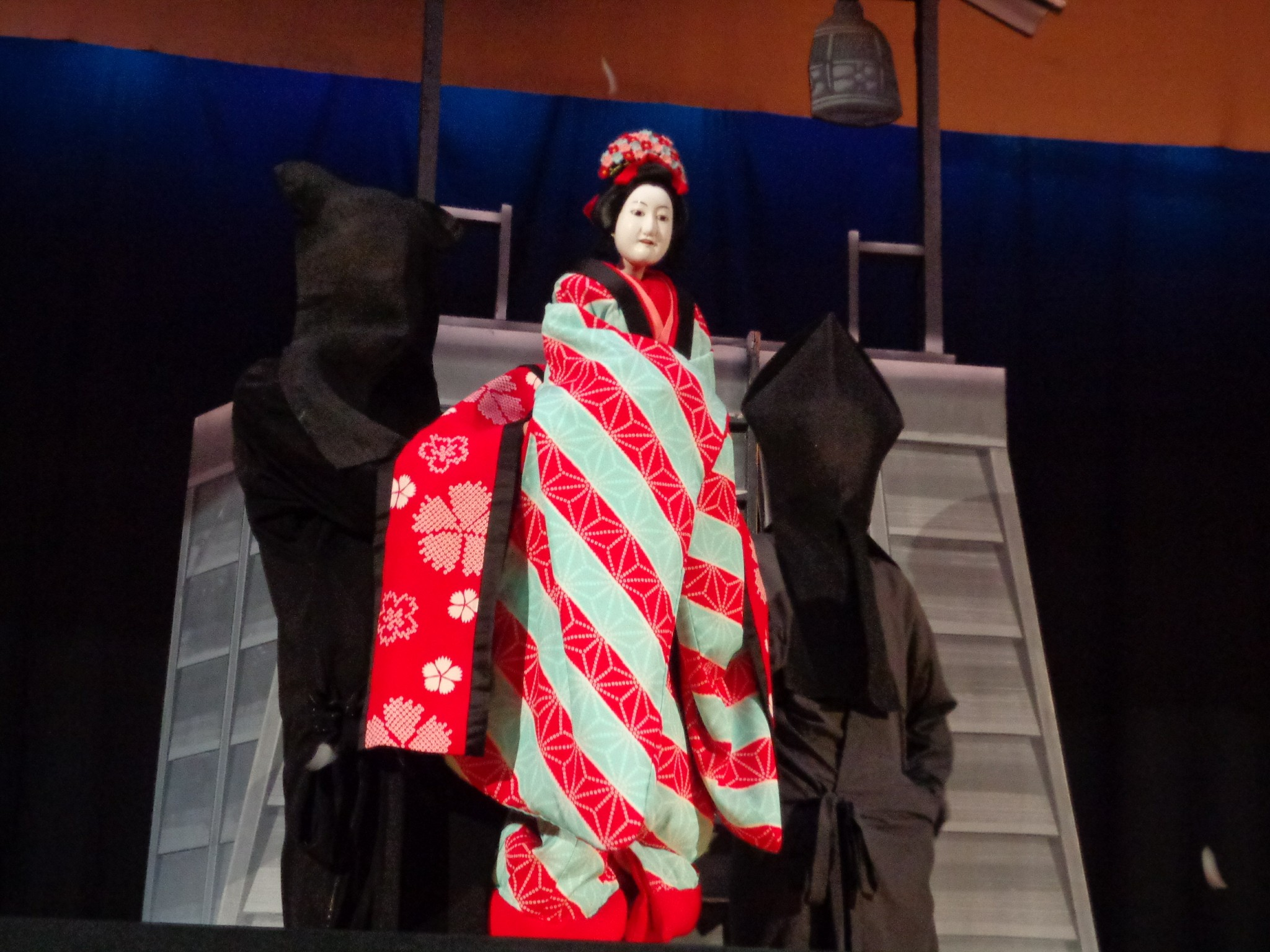
Bunraku scene from Date Musume Koi no Higanoko (伊達娘恋緋鹿子) depicting Yaoya Oshichi climbing the tower

Bunraku began in the 16th century. Puppets and bunraku were used in Japanese theatre as early as the Noh plays. Medieval records prove the use of puppets in Noh plays too. The puppets were 3–4 feet (0.91–1.22 m) tall, and the dolls were manipulated by puppeteers in full view of the audience. The puppeteers controlling the legs and hands of the puppets were dressed entirely in black, while the head puppeteer, in contrast, wore a colourful costume. Music and chanting are popular conventions of bunraku, and the shamisen player is usually considered to be the leader of the production. The shamisen player also has the shortest hair.

=== Yose ===
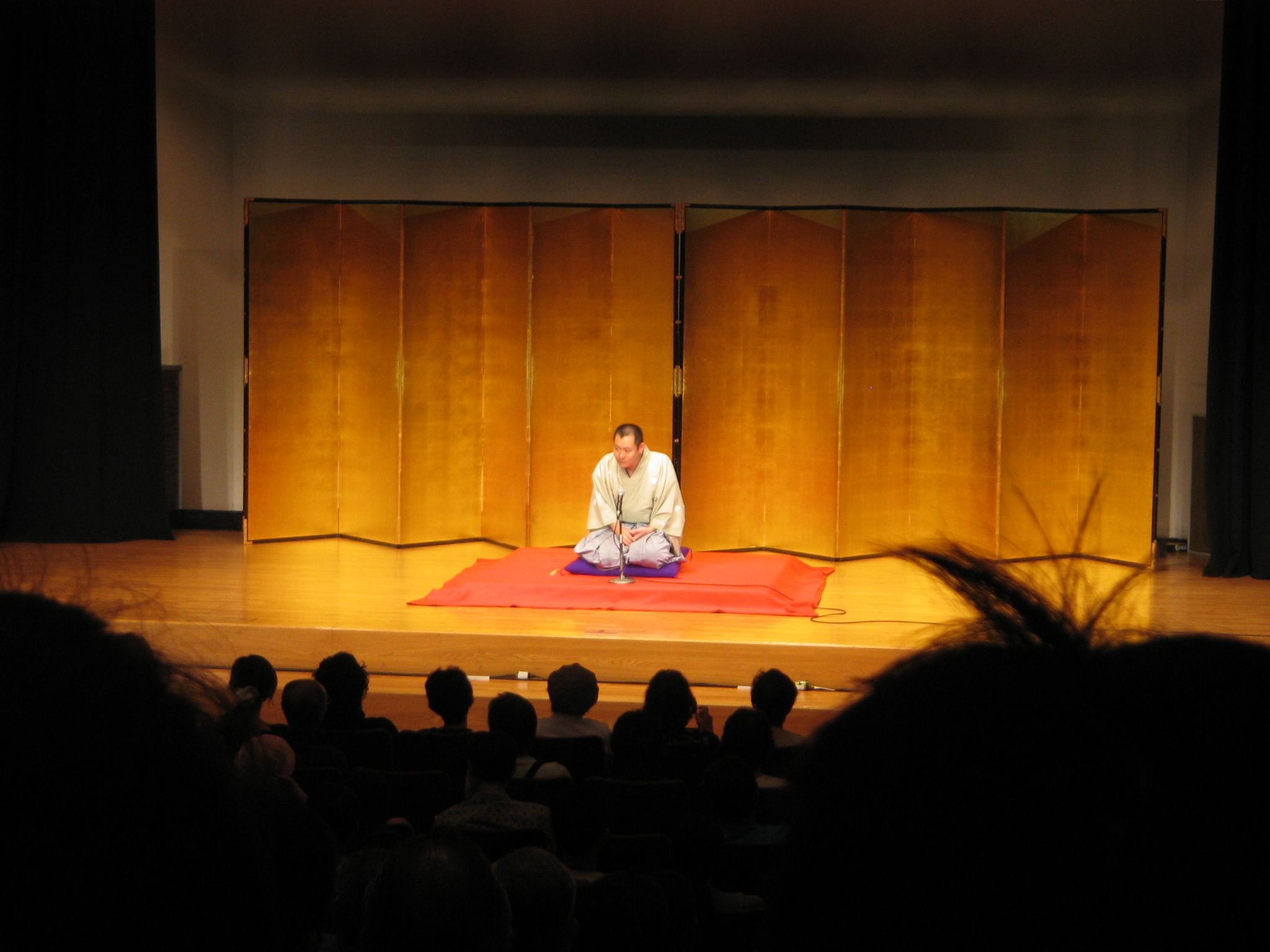
Rakugo, a form of yose

Yose was a popular form of spoken theatre in the Edo period. The term is the shortened form of Hito yose seki (人寄せ席, roughly "where people sit together"). Towards the end of the Edo period, there were several hundred theatres, about one per district (町, chō). The entrance fee, the "wooden door penny" (木戸銭, Kido-zeni) was small.

A number of variants existed:

- "Narrative stories" (講談, Kōdan)
- "Erotic stories" (人情噺, Ninjō-banashi)
- "Comic stories" (落語, Rakugo)
- "Magic arts" (手品, Tejina)
- "Shadow theatre" (写し絵, Utsushi-e)
- "Imitation of several people" (八人芸, Hachinin-gei)
- "Ghost stories" (怪談, Kaidan)
- "Artful tales" (芸屋噺)

== Modern theatre ==
Japanese modern drama in the early 20th century consisted of shingeki (experimental Western-style theatre), which employed naturalistic acting and contemporary themes in contrast to the stylized conventions of kabuki and Noh. Hōgetsu Shimamura and Kaoru Osanai were two figures influential in the development of shingeki.

In the post-war period, there was a phenomenal growth in creative new dramatic works, which introduced fresh aesthetic concepts that revolutionized the orthodox modern theatre. Challenging the realistic, psychological drama focused on "tragic historical progress" of the Western-derived shingeki, young playwrights broke with such accepted tenets as conventional stage space, placing their action in tents, streets, and open areas located all over Tokyo. Plots became increasingly complex, with play-within-a-play sequences, moving rapidly back and forth in time, and intermingling reality with fantasy. Dramatic structure was fragmented, with the focus on the performer, who often used a variety of masks to reflect different personae.

Playwrights returned to common stage devices perfected in Noh and kabuki to project their ideas, such as employing a narrator, who could also use English for international audiences. Major playwrights in the 1980s were Kara Juro, Shimizu Kunio, and Betsuyaku Minoru, all closely connected to specific companies. In contrast, the fiercely independent Murai Shimako who won awards throughout the world for her numerous works focusing on the Hiroshima bombing, performed plays with only one or two actresses. In the 1980s, Japanese stagecraft evolved into a more refined, sophisticated, and complex format than earlier post-war experiments but lacked their bold critical spirit. In this time period, women began to run their own theater companies such as Kishida Rio, Kisaragi Koharu, Nagai Ai, and Watanabe Eriko.

Tadashi Suzuki developed a unique method of performer training which integrated avant-garde concepts with classical Noh and kabuki techniques, an approach that became a major creative force in Japanese and international theatre in the 1980s. Another highly original East–West fusion occurred in the inspired production Nastasya, adapted from Dostoevsky's The Idiot, in which Bando Tamasaburo, a famed kabuki onnagata (female impersonator), played the roles of both the prince and his fiancée.

=== Shinpa ===
Shinpa is a modern form of theatre. It earned the name "shinpa" (literally meaning "new school") to contrast it from "kyūha" ("old school" or kabuki) due to its more contemporary and realistic stories. With the success of the Seibidan troupe, however, shinpa theater ended up with a form that was closer to kabuki than to the later shingeki because of its continued use of onnagata and off-stage music. As a theatrical form, it was most successful in the early 1900s as the works of novelists such as Kyōka Izumi, Kōyō Ozaki, and Roka Tokutomi were adapted for the stage. With the introduction of cinema in Japan, shinpa became one of the first film genres, in opposition again to kyūha films, as many films were based on shinpa plays.

=== Shōgekijō ===
The 1980s also encouraged the creation of the shōgekijō, literally "little theatre". This usually meant amateur theatrical troupes making plays designed to be seen by anyone and everyone — not necessarily as meaningful in nature as they were simply entertaining. Some of the more philosophical playwrights and directors of that time are Noda Hideki and Shōji Kōkami.

Popular shōgekijō theatrical troupes include Nylon 100, Gekidan Shinkansen, Tokyo Sunshine Boys, and Halaholo Shangrila.

Recently, a new generation of shōgekijō artists who are labelled as the "Generation of the Lost Decade" or the "Generation of 2000s" has emerged. Principal artists among this generation include: Toshiki Okada, Shiro Maeda, Kuro Tanino, Daisuke Miura, Tomohiro Maekawa.

=== Western plays in Japan ===
Many classics of the Western canon from Ancient Greek theatre, William Shakespeare, Fyodor Dostoevsky to Samuel Beckett, are performed in Tokyo today. A large number of performances, perhaps as many as 3,000, are given each year, making Tokyo one of the world's leading theatrical centers.

The opening of the replica of the Globe Theatre was celebrated by importing an entire British company to perform all of Shakespeare's historical plays, while other Tokyo theatres produced other Shakespearean plays including various new interpretations of Hamlet and King Lear. The Globe Theatre, located in Shin-Ōkubo in Tokyo, now belongs mostly to Johnny's Entertainment and the promotion of pop idols in the acting field.

Yukio Ninagawa is an internationally known Japanese director and playwright who often turns to elements of Shakespeare for inspiration. In 1995 he performed the Shakespeare Tenpo 12Nen, an interpretation of the wildly popular British theatre Shakespeare Condensed: all of Shakespeare's plays in two hours. Famous actors such as Natsuki Mari and Karawa Toshiaki were involved.

== Popular entertainment in Japan ==
=== Musical Theatre ===
Western-style musical theatre first came to Japan in 1911, with the opening of the Imperial Theatre, the first Western-style theatre in Japan. The theatre was demolished and rebuilt, with the second iteration opening in 1966. It is run by Toho. Major productions staged in the theatre include translated productions of Les Miserables (a West End replica) and Elisabeth (an original staging), two of Toho's biggest hits, as well as original musicals such as Lady Bess, Spy x Family, and SHIROH, a 2004 collaboration with Gekidan Shinkansen. In 2025, the theatre is being demolished, with a rebuilding set to open in 2030.

In 1953, the Shiki Theatre Company formed. The company produces both Broadway replicas and original plays and musicals.

Death Note, originally produced by Horipro and composed by Frank Wildhorn, has been one of the biggest successes for Japanese musicals internationally, largely due to the fame of its source material, a popular manga series. It has had several runs in South Korea. In 2024, it had its first English-language production in London.

Umeda Arts Theatre, the Musicals of Japan Origin project, Meijiza, and other companies have also produced original musicals in Japan.

Japan has also seen productions of musicals from South Korea, France, Austria, and other places around the world that have not had English-language productions. Elisabeth is the most famous of these. Others include Mozart!, Frankenstein (Lee and Wang), Smoke, Fan Letter, Mozart L'Opera Rock, and 1789: Les Amants de la Bastille.

=== Theatrical revues ===
Outside of traditional theatrical entertainment, theatrical revues began to be recognized as popular entertainment in Japan during the early 1900s. Originating in the West, the light theatrical entertainment offered by theatrical revues inspired the creation of famed Japanese revue companies such as the Takarazuka Revue, founded by Ichizō Kobayashi in 1914, with a failed swimming pool in Takarazuka turned into a theatre.

Following the rise of Western and European culture influencing Japanese social, political, and economic culture, Japan's entertainment culture was additionally influenced. Within the popular entertainment of the Takarazuka Revue Company, its repertoire consisted of Euro-Western performance and musical styles alongside traditional Japanese performance elements. This would consist of Western and European stories (such as The Rose of Versailles), Western musical arrangements (such as CHICAGO), as well as the inclusion of traditional Japanese stories and music.

=== 2.5D musical ===
2.5D musicals are stage adaptations of anime, manga, and video game series. While stage adaptations of anime and manga have existed since the 1970s, they gained popularity around the 2000s through Musical: The Prince of Tennis. Modern 2.5D musicals use projection mapping for backgrounds and special effects.

Notable modern productions included: Hunter x Hunter, Pretty Guardians Sailor Moon, Death Note: the Musical and Your Lie in April.

== See also ==
- Glossary of Japanese theater
- Culture of Japan
- Takarazuka Revue
- GEAR, the first unlimited-run show in Japan with original contents.
- Bugaku
- Performing arts
