= Larisa Rudakova =

Russian soprano singer (born 1963)

Larisa Rudakova Лариса Рудакова
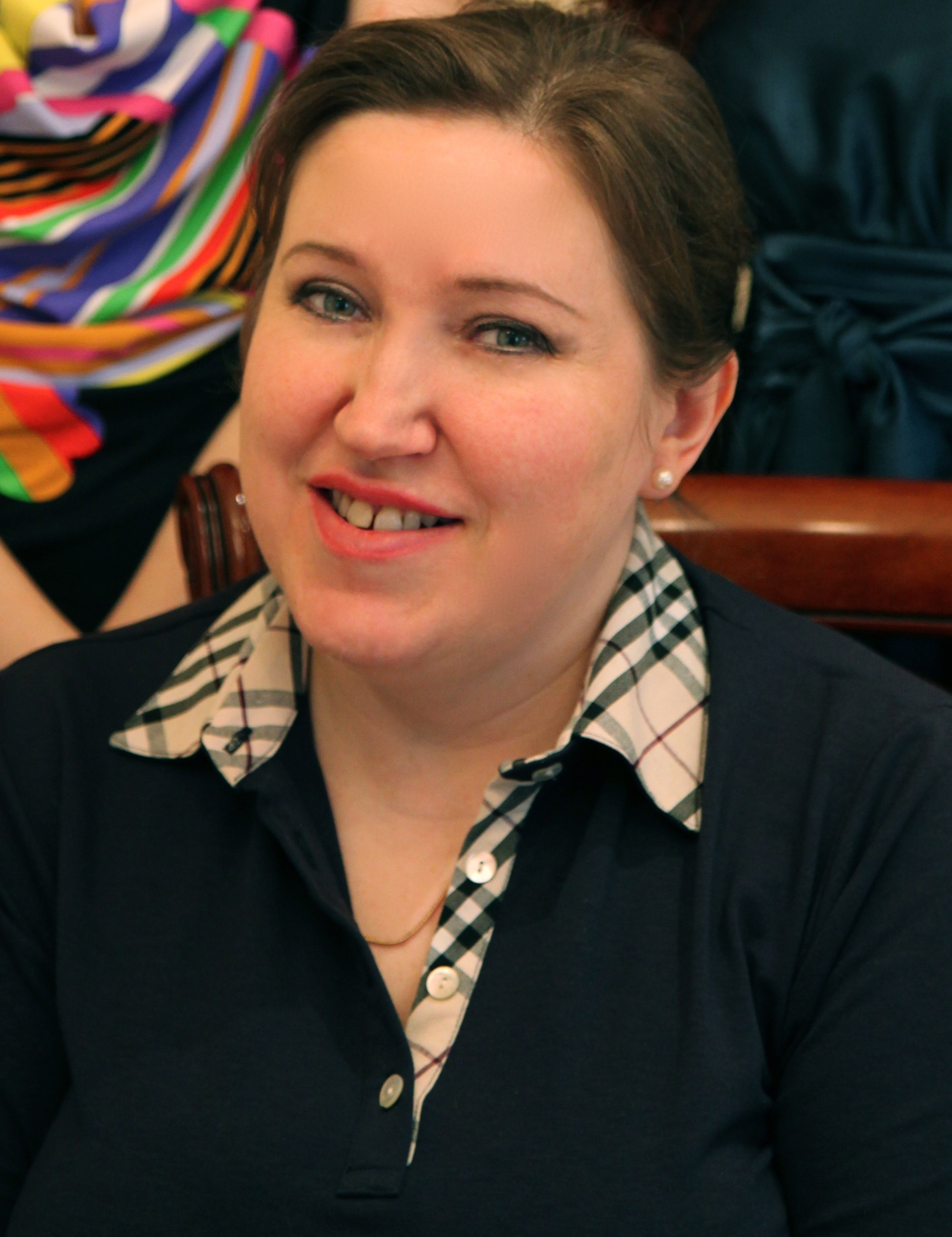

Background information
- Born: Larisa Borisovna Rudakova; 9 April 1963 (age 62); Lesnoy, Sverdlovsk Oblast
- Occupation: Opera singer (soprano)
- Years active: 1997-present
- Employer: Bolshoi Theatre

Larisa Borisovna Rudakova (Russian: Лариса Борисовна Рудакова) is a Russian soprano singer.

== Early life ==
Rudakova was born in Yekaterinburg and then somewhere in the 1990s moved to Moscow where he attended and then graduated from the Moscow Conservatory in 1992. There she was under guidance from Irina Maslennikova, and following that was hired by the Bolshoi Theatre where she became a terrific performer because she sang the role of Rosina 11 times in the Gioachino Rossini’s The Barber of Seville.

== Career ==
By 1993 she became the soloist of the theatre. She used to travel for performances as well to such opera houses as Metropolitan, Hamburg and Vienna State Operas. From 1997 to 1998 she sang Mozart's The Magic Flute at the Wallonian Royal Opera and the same year was a participant of the Salzburg Festival where she sang another Mozart's work called Mitridate, re di Ponto under Roger Norrington's conduction. Later on, she became a participant of the All-World Theatre Olympiad where she sang a role of Regan in a contemporary opera based on Toshio Hosokawa's work called Vision of Lear which at that time was Tadashi Suzuki's production.

In 2001 she was awarded with the Order of Friendship and three years later performed at the Belgrade National Opera where she sang the heroine of La traviata. In 2005 she appeared as Gilda in a Rigoletto opera at Sofia's National Opera and Ballet and the same year participated at the Jan Kiepura Festival which was named after famous Polish tenor Jan Kiepura. From 2006 to 2007 she had appearances at both the Cadogan Carnegie Halls as well as Latvian Dzintari Concert Hall and was a probationist at the Deutsche Grammophon.

== Bolshoi Theatre ==
- The Golden Cockerel — The Queen of Shemakha
- La traviata — Violetta
- The Tsar’s Bride — Marfa
- Ivan Susanin — Antonida
- Lucia di Lammermoor — main role
- La bohème — Musetta
- Un ballo in maschera — Oscar
- The Snow Maiden — main role
- Iolanta — main role
- The Tale of Tsar Saltan — The Swan Princess
- The Magic Flute — Queen of the Night
- Rigoletto — Gilda
- Tancredi — Amenaide
- Semiramide — main role
- Carmen — Micaela
- Betrothal in a Monastery — Louisa
- Ruslan and Lyudmila — Lyudmila
