= Yoshiyuki Fukuda =

Japanese playwright and screenwriter (1931–2025)

Yoshiyuki Fukuda 福田 善之
- Born: 21 October 1931; Nihonbashi, Chūō-Ku, Tokyo, Empire of Japan
- Died: 21 August 2025 (aged 93); Kawasaki, Kanagawa, Japan
- Education: University of Tokyo
- Occupations: Playwright; screenwriter; director
- Writing career
- Years active: 1953–20??
- Genres: Shingeki, Angura, television screenwriting

Yoshiyuki Fukuda (福田 善之, Fukuda Yoshiyuki; Kōnosu Taizō (鴻巣 泰三), 21 October 1931 – 21 August 2025) was a Japanese playwright, screenwriter and director. Remembered as one of the founding figures of the Angura ("underground") theatre movement in Japan, Fukuda also served as chairman of the Japan Directors Association from 2003 to 2007.

== Early life ==
Yoshiyuki Fukuda was born Taizō Kōnosu in the Nihonbashi district of Tokyo on 21 October 1931. After graduating from Azabu High School, he enrolled at the University of Tokyo where he graduated with a degree in French literature in 1954. While still in school, he co-wrote a play with playwright Asaya Fujita and staged it at the 1953 May Festival. After graduating, Fukuda briefly worked as a reporter for the Tokyo Times newspaper before joining the Mingei Theatre Company as an assistant director, later branching out into play writing under the guidance of his mentor Junji Kinoshita.

== Shingeki and Angura ==
As a member of the Shingeki ("new theatre") movement, Fukuda's early works adopted a socialist realist stance, as reflected in plays such as Long Rows of the Gravestones, which dramatized the Kawai Eijiro incident of 1938, in which a liberal professor had his books banned, and which had left a profound impression on Fukuda's mentor Kinoshita when he was a student. Another early play in this mode was Oppekepe, which dramatized the struggle of the Freedom and People's Rights Movement during the Meiji period and received the National Arts Festival's Encouragement Award (奨励賞) in 1958.

From 1959 to 1960, virtually the entire Shingeki movement was mobilized to take part in the massive Anpo protests against revision of the U.S.-Japan Security Treaty (known as "Anpo" in Japanese), under the auspices of an umbrella organization called the Shingeki Workers Association (新劇人会議 Shingekijin Kaigi). However, many younger members of the movement, including Fukuda, sympathized with the student radicals in the Zengakuren student federation and were extremely disappointed that the Shingeki Association enforced strict conformity to the passive and ineffectual protest policies of the Japan Communist Party, even after right-wing counter-protesters brutally attacked Shingeki members during a protest march at the National Diet on 15 June 1960, resulting in 80 members being injured. Although discontent had been building throughout the 1950s, the radicalizing experience of the Anpo Protests helped convince Fukuda and other younger Shingeki members to break away and found their own theater troupes, where they could experiment with much more radical forms of theater.

In 1960, Fukuda became one of the founders, along with noh actor Hideo Kanze, composer Hikaru Hayashi, and 20 actors from the third graduating class of Mingei's training program, of the new Seinen Geijutsu Gekijō ("Youth Art Theater"), abbreviated Seigei. Immediately following the Anpo Protests, Seigei staged a play written by Fukuda called Record Number 1, which is often cited as the first play in the newly emerging Angura ("underground") theatre movement in Japan. Record Number 1 was extremely unorthodox and experimental, blurring the lines between reality and play and breaking the fourth wall. In this play, the actors of Seigei expressed their emotions and frustration around their experiences in the recently concluded Anpo protests. Historian of Japanese theater David G. Goodman has called Record Number 1 “a pivotal moment in the history of the modern Japanese theater movement,” one that “challenged every aspect of the Shingeki orthodoxy.”

A large number of Angura directors and playwrights worked with Seigei and Fukuda in the early 1960s, including Jūrō Kara, Makoto Satō, and Minoru Betsuyaku. They then went on to found their own experimental theater troupes later in the 1960s.

Fukuda's next major play was Brave Records of the Sanada Clan (Sanada fuunroku), an account of Sanada Yukimura's doomed defense of Osaka Castle in 1615 which straddled a fine line between honoring and mocking his earlier works valorizing social struggle by turning it into a musical. First staged as a play in 1962, the work was released as a film the following year, proving to be a box office bomb, but achieving cult film status in later years. The original play was nominated for the Kishida Prize for Drama, but did not win.

Perhaps Fukuda's most famous play is Find Hakamadare! (Hakamadare wa doko da), which was staged by Seigei in 1964. In this satyrical play, a group of medieval peasants search for a Robin Hood-like figure called "Hakamadare" to lead them in their struggles, but when the finally find him and he turns out to be a self-serving villain, they kill him and establish their own government. Find Hakamadare! was awarded the Kishida Prize for Drama, but Fukuda turned it down due to past conflicts with some of the judges.

== Later life and death ==
In 1966, Seigei dissolved. Thereafter, Fukuda became a prolific screenwriter, penning numerous episodes of a variety of television dramas, including NHK's Taiga Drama series of historical epics, as well as feature films and anime. He was the sole screenwriter of the 1976 Taiga Drama Wind, Clouds, and Rainbows (Kaze to kumo to niji to).

Having participated in the founding of the Japan Directors Association in 1960, Fukuda served as its Chairman from 2003 to 2007.

Fukuda died on 21 August 2025, at the age of 93.
