= Elena Stikhina =

Russian operatic soprano (born 1986)

- Елена Стихина
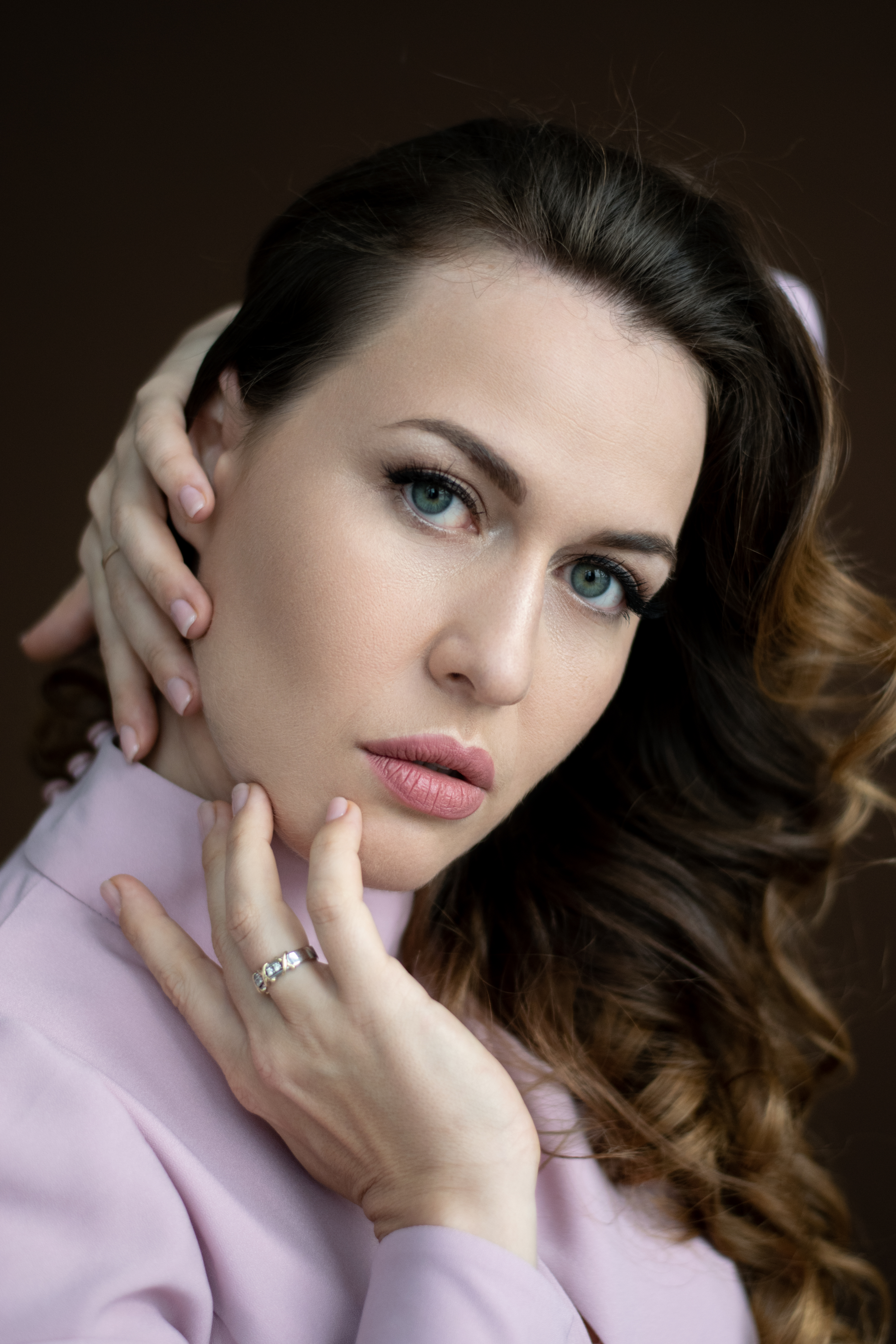
- Born: 25 December 1986 (age 39); Lesnoy, Soviet Union
- Citizenship: Russian
- Education: Moscow Conservatory
- Occupation: Operatic soprano
- Years active: 2012–present
- Awards: Operalia

Elena Stikhina (born 25 December 1986) is a Russian opera singer (soprano).

Stikhina performed several times in Salzburg Festival: Médée (2019), Aida (2022), Falstaff (2023).

== Biography ==
Born in Lesnoy, Stikhina studied piano at the city children's music school under T. P. Mochalova. After completing her studies at the music school, she continued her education at the city House of Culture. Thanks to her teacher Olga Sergeyevna Khruleva, who taught vocal techniques, Stikhina developed a love for classical music.

Stikhina graduated from the Moscow Conservatory in 2012, where she studied under the guidance of Larisa Rudakova. During her studies, she became the first performer of works such as "My Love", "Musical Offering to A. Tarkovsky", "Cycle of Works on Verses by A. Voznesensky" by K. Shiryayev, and "Cycle on Verses by Persian Poets" by F. Khaidarova.

From 2012 to 2014, she studied under Makvala Kasrashvili at the Center for Opera Singing led by Galina Vishnevskaya.

After graduating from the conservatory, she joined a Russian-German ensemble of young performers. She auditioned at the Primorsky Theater of Opera and Ballet and began performing the role of Nedda in Ruggero Leoncavallo's opera Pagliacci.

In 2013, she participated in the International Opera Masterclass in Zürich and performed at the Beethoven Festival in Bonn, Brucknerhaus in Linz, and Tonhalle, Zürich.

Stikhina became the laureate of the 1st degree of the 2nd International Rachmaninoff Vocalists Competition. In 2013, she received a special prize from the Rostov State Musical Theatre. In Austria, in 2014, she became the 1st degree laureate of the International Competizione dell' Opera Competition and received the Audience Choice Award.

In 2014, she became a soloist at the State Primorsky Theater of Opera and Ballet. In 2016–2017, she made her debut performances at Theater Basel (Leonora in La forza del destino), Mariinsky Theatre (in Salome), Finnish National Opera, and Paris Opera. She performed the role of Desdemona in Verdi's opera Otello on the Primorsky stage of the Mariinsky Theatre. She participated in concerts by José Carreras as part of his farewell tour.

In 2017, she became a soloist at the Mariinsky Theatre, where she performed roles such as Salome (Salome), Electra (Idomeneo), Floria Tosca (Tosca), Lisa (The Queen of Spades), Nedda (Pagliacci), Donna Leonora (La forza del destino).

Stikhina's repertoire also includes roles like Olga (The Story of a Real Man), Tatiana (Eugene Onegin), Micaëla (Carmen), Nedda (Pagliacci), Countess (The Marriage of Figaro), Violetta (La traviata), Zemfira (Aleko), the title role in the opera Iolanta and Medea (Médée). At the Royal Opera House Covent Garden she sang Tosca, Aida, and in July 2025 Leonora in Il trovatore.

Stikhina received the national opera award "Onegin" and the highest theatre award of Saint Petersburg, the "Golden Sofit". She was nominated for the "Golden Mask" award.

On 31 May 2017, during the final performance of Eugene Onegin at the Paris Opera, Elena stood in for Anna Netrebko in all the shows of the minimalist production by director Willy Decker from 1995, which was revived on the stage of the Opéra Bastille. She recalls how she sang Tatiana: "Anna fell ill, and when it was announced in the hall before the curtain rose that I would be performing instead of her, the audience started booing. I thought: just don't start crying. But after the aria 'I am writing to you – what else is there to do?' I physically felt the audience's tension release, along with mine. However, it wasn't easy to come out for the final bows – you had given all your energy, but you can't be responsible for other people's emotions, you don't know how they'll react. A shower of applause followed, and it lasted for a long time."

== Awards ==
- 2025/2026: 'Singer of the year' by the opera magazine Opernwelt.
