= Kuro Tanino =

Japanese theatre director and playwright (born 1976)

Kuro Tanino (タニノクロウ) (born 1976) is a Japanese theatre director and playwright.

Born into a family of psychiatrists, Tanino also himself trained and worked as a psychiatrist before turning to theatre. He founded the theatre group Niwa Gekidan Penino (literally "garden theatre company Penino") in 2000, and he writes, directs and designs all productions. He is also a painter and sculptor.

His plays are highly surrealistic, filled with bizarre characters and creatures, influenced by Juro Kara. He prefers to use storyboards to writing regular play texts. The design is often very meticulous and colorful, with strange, incongruous elements crammed into small spaces.

Influenced by Marcel Duchamp's method of creating miniatures of his work and carrying them around with him, Tanino considers his sets and plays to be like fully formed pictures, arranging performers like parts of an installation or tableaux.

His series of "Hakobune" (ark) plays were staged at his apartment and involved elaborate sets in spite of the cramped sizes. "Frustrating Picture Book for Adults" (2008) was later also staged in Germany, Switzerland, the Netherlands and Finland, while "The Room, Nobody Knows" (2012) was performed in America in January 2014 and has also been staged in Europe.

For "The Frustrating Picture Book for Adults" the stage was divided into upper and lower platforms, with the upper part inhabited by two old women, one with a pig’s face and the other with a sheep’s face. In the low-ceilinged room of the set, there is a log piercing the ceiling and another log that pierces the floor between the upper and lower levels. In the lower level a young man in student uniform was tied to one of the trees, causing him to ejaculate when the tree was stroked by the "pig" or the "sheep". They would then eat the white liquid that came out of the tree.

"The Town Where the Sun and Underwear are seen" (2009) was staged at Festival/Tokyo 2009 Autumn, while "Box in the Big Trunk" (2013), which combined the three Hakobune productions into one "set", was performed in Tokyo and Kyoto.

He has also directed adaptations of Ibsen and Chekhov.
