= Angura =

Japanese theatrical movement

Angura (アングラ), also known as the "Little Theater" (小劇場, shōgekijō) movement, was a Japanese avant-garde theater movement in the 1960s and 1970s that reacted against the Brechtian modernism and formalist realism of postwar Shingeki theater in Japan to stage anarchic "underground" productions in tents, on street corners, and in small spaces that explored themes of primitivism, sexuality, and embodied physicality. The term "Angura" was an abbreviation of the Japanese phrase "underground theater" (アンダーグラウンド演劇, andaaguraundo engeki).

Major figures in the Angura movement included Shūji Terayama, Jūrō Kara, Makoto Satō, Minoru Betsuyaku, Yoshiyuki Fukuda, and Tadashi Suzuki. Renowned graphic artist Yokoo Tadanori produced numerous promotional artworks for Angura productions, and helped co-found the Angura theater troupe Tenjō Sajiki.

== Background ==
Angura emerged in the early 1960s, in reaction to the structural and ideological constraints of the Japanese modern theater movement known as Shingeki (literally, "new theater"). Shingeki itself had developed in the early years of the 20th century in response to the perceived "irrationality" of premodern forms of Japanese theater, such kabuki and noh. As a result, Shingeki theater troupes sought to present Western-style productions in modern, Western-style theaters with realistic sets, costumes, dialogues, and situations.

In the 1920s, Shingeki fell under the influence of the left-leaning Proletarian Arts Movement in Japan and was suppressed by the militarist regime during World War II. After the war, the Shingeki movement fell strongly under the influence of the Japan Communist Party (JCP), and became increasingly dependent on attendance by JCP-affiliated labor unions to sell tickets and fill seats. This meant that Shingeki productions had to conform to Communist Party ideology and the conservative tastes of the labor unionist attendees.

Another issue was the pyramidal structure of the most prestigious Shingeki troupes. Leading Shingeki troupes such as Bungaku-za, Haiyū-za, and Gekidan Mingei recruited members out of leading Japanese universities and put them through rigorous training programs, but then made them wait years or even decades to have starring roles or any input into the artistic direction of the troupe. In some cases, recruits completed the entire training program, but were then not even offered a job with the troupe.

== The 1960 Anpo Protests ==
In 1960, virtually the entire Shingeki community was mobilized to battle against revision of the U.S.-Japan Security Treaty (known as "Anpo" in Japanese), under the auspices of an umbrella organization called the Shingeki Workers Association (新劇人会議 Shingekijin Kaigi). However, many younger members of the troupes, who tended to sympathize with the student radicals in the Zengakuren student federation, were extremely disappointed that the Shingeki Association enforced strict conformity to the protest policies of the Japan Communist Party, which they deemed passive and ineffectual, even after right-wing counter-protester brutally attacked the Shingeki members during a protest march at the National Diet on June 15, 1960, resulting in 80 members being injured. Although discontent had been building throughout the 1950s, the radicalizing experience of the Anpo Protests helped convince many younger Shingeki members to break away and found their own theater troupes, where they could experiment with much more radical forms of theater.

One of the earliest new troupes to break away was the Seinen Geijutsu Gekijō ("Youth Art Theater"), abbreviated Seigei, founded by 20 members of the third graduating class of Mingei's training program, several of whom had been denied jobs, as well as playwright Yoshiyuki Fukuda, noh actor Hideo Kanze, and composer Hikaru Hayashi. Immediately following the Anpo Protests, Seigei staged its first production, which included a play written by Fukuda called Record Number 1, which is often cited as the first Angura-style play. Record Number 1 was extremely unorthodox and experimental, blurring the lines between reality and play and breaking the fourth wall. In this play, the actors of Seigei expressed their emotions and frustration around their experiences in the recently concluded Anpo protests. Historian of Japanese theater David G. Goodman has called Record Number 1 “a pivotal moment in the history of the modern Japanese theater movement,” one that “challenged every aspect of the Shingeki orthodoxy.”

A large number of Angura directors and playwrights worked with Seigei and Fukuda in the early 1960s, including Jūrō Kara, Makoto Satō, and Minoru Betsuyaku. They then went on to found their own experimental theater troupes later in the 1960s. Kara would go on to found the Situation Theater, also known as the "Red Tent Theater" because they performed in a red tent, and Satō would go on to form the Black Tent Theater, which performed in a black tent. Betsuyaku helped co-found the Waseda Little Theater with Tadashi Suzuki. Other influential Angura troupes included Shūji Terayama's Tenjō Sajiki, Kazuyoshi Kushida's Free Theater, Yukio Ninagawa's Contemporary Theater, and Shogo Ōta's Transformation Theater.

== Characteristics ==
Angura troupes and playwrights sought to challenge the conservative Shingeki modern theater orthodoxy in every way possible. To this end, they staged wild, raucous productions in unconventional venues, outdoors, or in tents, featuring non-linear plots, frequent breaking of the fourth wall and direct interaction with audiences, bizarre costumes and makeup, intensely emotional outbursts by characters, and fantastic and phantasmagorical elements. In contrast to Shingeki productions, Angura made extensive use of music and actively sought to evoke audience laughter or even anger or shock. Major emphases of Angura productions included intense physicality, overt sexuality, and the use of fantasy or "primitive" motifs. In these ways, Angura had much in common with Butoh dance, which emerged around the same time, and helped pave the way for the emergence of Pink film in Japan.

== Angura today ==
The Angura theater movement remains active to this day (as does Shingeki). Major Angura troupes active at the present time include Jūrō Kara's Kara Group (renamed from "Situation Theater"), Tadashi Suzuki's Suzuki Company of Toga (aka SCOT, renamed from "Waseda Little Theater"), Yukichi Matsumoto's Osaka-based Ishinha ("Revolution School") company, Ei Takatori's Gesshoku Opera Company, a musical troupe nicknamed "Dark Takarazuka" for its female-focused cast and Angura versions of Takarazuka-style musical productions, and Theater Laboratory Universal Gravitational Force, founded by members of Tenjō Sajiki after the death of Shūji Terayama in 1983.

== Suzuki Tadashi’s Acting Methodology ==
Suzuki Tadashi was instrumental in creating a training system for actors to understand the physical elements of Angura. He taught the effects of hybridity on the Angura space and how it relates to the culture and politics of the time. Tadashi started his work at the Waseda Little Theatre in the early 1960s. In 1976 he moved to the Suzuki Company of Toga. During his time with these establishments his work explored theories about the incorporeal elements of theatre like archetypal plot. His work pays homage to no, kyogen and classical Greek theatre. The main tenets of his theory was that the actor operates inside a field of spatial and cultural dynamics. Theatre is not only the play, but how the actor inhabits the space they’re in and the “collective consciousness commonly associated with the ritual dimensions of traditional theatres” (p59). In Tadashi’s theory, Angura interrupts this traditional space by hosting plays in unconventional locations while still drawing on historical consciousness. His actors displayed formal movement patterns, fully voiced delivery of texts and use of chants to present the audience with a classically informed stage that incorporated layers of contemporary humor and farce.

Tadashi’s training method aimed to free actors of their own mental and physical blocks and ground them in the present. On the stage, the actor was encouraged to live in their own creative instincts. Despite the end goal of creative liberty on the stage, Tadashi’s training consisted of very rigid and disciplined physical exercises. Actors were led on walks and marches to help them form a sense of their body within space and control the intensity of their performance energy. Their bodies were rigorously trained through repetition and precise movements in time to the drum of a bamboo kendo sword beaten on the floor. Through this type of archetypal acting, Tadashi’s scenes were driven through mise-en-scene of bodies interacting with each other through space.

== Shūji Terayama's Tenjō Sajiki and the Absurd ==
Terayama’s company was one of the most infamous theatre groups in angura. They were known for their “radical disarticulation of theatrical space." In some of the spaces they performed in, one member of the audience could have an entirely different experience than another. Tenjō Sajiki was known for using intense lighting or near pitch black darkness. They would use different levels of sound, create dozens of intricate and strange props and regularly perform in environments that were subjected to the chaos of the outside world. Some of the props were used to chain actors to the stage and act out gory scenes. Other actors were hidden in the audience, so much so that after a play held in a public bathhouse, one play goer remarked that “nobody could be sure who were the spectators and who were the actors."

The Hunchback of Amori is one such play that audiences raved and criticized for its macabre atmosphere. It contains themes of sexual assault between a servant and her wealthy employer and a mother and her child who is physically deformed. The mother also claims to murder her child in the play. The grotesque and eerie and traditional are weaved into the play in the unique art characteristic of Tenjō Sajiki. There are multiple poem readings and actors dressed as shadows that appear from the audience to frighten them. Audiences were left in fear of what’s behind them.

One of the most pivotal moments in Terayama’s career is when he declared that theatre had become “the slave of writing” and that “we must purge the theatre from the play.” In a play he writes after this entitled The Knock, actors are given their lines, but can choose to speak them whenever they wish.
