= Jūrō Kara =

Japanese playwright (1940–2024)

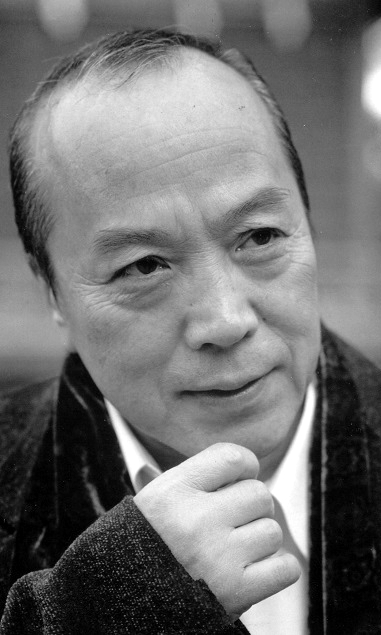
- Born: 11 February 1940; Tokyo, Japan
- Died: 4 May 2024 (aged 84); Tokyo, Japan
- Education: Meiji University
- Occupations: Theatre director, playwright, actor, author, songwriter
- Writing career
- Years active: 1963–2024
- Genre: Angura

Jūrō Kara (唐十郎, Kara Jūrō; born Ōtsuru Yoshihide (大靏 義英); 11 February 1940 – 4 May 2024) was a Japanese avant-garde playwright, theatre director, author, actor, and songwriter. He was at the forefront of the Angura ("underground") theatre movement in Japan.

== Career ==
Graduating from Meiji University, Kara formed his own theatre troupe, Jōkyō Gekijo (Situation Theatre), in 1963. They began performing in a red tent in Hanazono Shrine in Shinjuku in 1967. According to the theatre historian, David G. Goodman, "Kara conceived his theatre in the premodern mold of kabuki—not the sanitized, aestheticized variety performed today, but the erotic, anarchic, plebeian sort performed during the Edo period (1600–1868) by itinerant troupes of actors who were rejected by bourgeois society as outcasts and 'riverbed beggars.' Emulating their itinerant forebears, Kara and his troupe performed throughout Japan in their mobile red tent." Kara won the Kishida Prize for Drama for Shojo kamen (The Virgin's Mask) in 1969, and the Akutagawa Prize for his novel Sagawa-kun kara no tegami in 1982. He later became a professor at Yokohama National University.

=== The Little Theatre Movement ===
The "Little Theatre" movement, also known as Angura, sought to free itself of the mainstream social norms and fixated on fantasy and dream versus the realistic portrayal of daily life of other theatrical forms. It was widely popular with the public because the new forms were more entertaining than enlightening and did not require a high level of education to be enjoyed.

The Little Theatre Movement in 1960s Japan didn't arise from nothing. It corresponded with many foreign influences such as the rise of the Off-Off-Broadway movement in New York, the productions of The Living Theatre, and Polish director Jerzy Grotowski's ideas of the importance of the body, who also had many of his writings translated into Japanese at the time. These and other experiments had a very real influence in Japan, but it would be wrong to conclude that it was foreign works that led to the birth of the Small Theatre Movement in Japan. The movement was very much a Japanese development which cultivated on Japanese soil even though it also received stimulation from the so-called international avant-garde. In Japan, this produced a few important things. First of all, it had created a bona fide and authentic Japanese contemporary theatre rooted in the Japanese character in lieu of being an imitation of the west. Second, these groups began creating their own works instead of depending on translated work often with the director of the company, usually a resident playwright, writing and staging a play on a subject of their choice. Third, the structure of dramatic literature in Japan transformed immensely. What was once mainly linear, realistic plays, became complex, multi-layered structures where time sequences were distorted and where the barriers that disconnected the ordinary from the extraordinary and reality from illusion were cast away. Fourth, there was a new attentiveness to the body of the actor, a movement away from the texts and oration. Kara's theory of the privileged body and Tadashi Suzuki's physical method arose from this range of work. This was a pursuit to absorb into contemporary theatre some of the characteristics of traditional Japanese theatre where the actor was primary over the text. Fifth, the theatre spaces were evolving. Formal theatres weren't the only places to venue performances anymore. Works were performed in small theatres, open spaces, tents, and even streets. And finally, there were numerous pursuits to bridge the gap between the traditional and contemporary. reinventing the practices and aesthetics of centuries of traditional theatre was a component in the creation a rooted theatre.

=== The Situation Theatre ===
During the 1960s and 1970s, established theatre companies had risen and fallen with a handful of them closing down entirely or renewing themselves with new names and directors. Many tried to rejuvenate theatre into something immediate and alive, which led to a myriad of approaches to that goal. Some tried new dramatic form, and others attempted to transform "modern theatre" by exploiting the pre-modern aspects in our lives. It was during those years that a new movement of spirit started to arise in the shingeki community as alternative-minded producing parties started appearing with distinct differences to those that had appeared before. Jūrō Kara formed one of the first major alternative groups called Jōkyō Gekijo (Situation Theatre), which was later known as Kara-gumi (the Kara Group). Kara and his Situation Theatre for example, explored the idea of freeing themselves from the limits of the theatre buildings.

The red tent had become as much their trademark as it was their mobile theatre. But Kara and his troupe didn't want to prove that they too could hop onto the bandwagon of bringing culture to the masses. Instead, he wanted to disprove the notion that people ought to be cultured. The ideas that Kara experimented with were based in the spirit of traditional Japanese theatre. In the past, actors couldn't even live amongst the poorest men and were treated with ridicule, yet at the same time they captivated those in the normal world. It was somewhat masochistic to attend the actors' performances, because the audience intentionally immersed themselves in a climactic world created by the lowly. The idea was that they felt the actors reflected their darker, more suppressed desires, frustrations, and hardships placed on them by the outside world. He implemented kabuki techniques and referred to the actors as "riverbed beggars", referencing the founding of kabuki.

=== Influences ===
One of the first companies that headed into the post-shingeki style of theatre was the Youth Art Theatre (Seinen Geikutsu Gekijō), established in 1959 by actors trained in Mingei's training program who were provided no spot in the shingeki troupe upon finishing their training. This group was also driven by the intensity and passion arising from their experiences participating in the massive Anpo Protests against the U.S.-Japan Security Treaty in 1959 and 1960. Yoshiyuki Fukuda, a committed socialist, joined Seinen as the resident playwright, best known for his work Find Hakamadare! (Hakamadare wa doko da, 1964), in which peasants look for a legendary hero to lead them. When he is exposed to being a self-serving opportunist and tells them a secret police is needed for his rule, they kill him and set up their own government. Fukuda had influenced Kara, as well as Minoru Betsuyaku and Satoh Makoto, all influential angura playwrights who worked with Seinen.

Large figures like Yamazaki Tetsu, born in 1947, rose from the 1960s and lifted theatre into a new direction. Kara took him in as an assistant director after Yamazaki had dropped out of Hiroshima University in 1970.

Hideki Noda, born in 1955, who was also influenced by Kara Jūrō, was the founder of the Dream Wanderers (Yume no Yūminsha) in 1976 at the University of Tokyo.

== The Theory of the Privileged Body ==
Through the theatre company Jōkyō Gekijo that Kara had created, he started to have guerrilla-like performances that adopted what is known as the tokkenteki nikutairon (the theory of the privileged body). He boldly affirmed that there was no longer a need for great play manuscripts in contemporary drama, and that it was the dramatic body of those who were on stage that was more important. Kara's beliefs of the "privileged body" was a dichotomy where the actor was a social pariah and a medium for the manifestation of the audience's dreams and desires.

In many of Kara's plays' dialogue, which have been criticized as being irrational, he removes the restraints of cause and effect. To counter the flowing and coherent narratives of modern drama, he liberates the bodies of the actors from the constraints of the script and brings back the bizarre and eerie being and grim emotions that arise from Japan's Noh and Kabuki tradition. One of Kara's major early works, Shōjo kamen (The Virgin's Mask 1969), which was translated by John K. Gillespie, details Kara's opposition to realism, which is embodied by Stanislavski's system. Gillespie had commented on Kara's emphasis on the bodies of the actors: "Kara recalls the very origin of kabuki and the riverbed beggars who were dissipating their bodies for the highest bidder but were looking, perhaps in vain, for a stage body through which they could express themselves." A short passage from the opening of Shōjo kamen will help to represent this point.

OLD WOMAN: It's what ghosts always want.

KAI: Which is? ...

OLD WOMAN: A body. (sings)

As time going by the virgin becomes an old woman,

if times till goes by I wonder if the old woman becomes a virgin.

I had children in the past,

only one of them, the smooth talker,

came back alone from the mountain -

Zarathustra rubbing his big grimy feet on my thighs,

this is a superman, rub, rub, rub.

Listen, mother, the body is big reason.

If so, Son, is the reason a bid body?

Then his big feet suddenly stopped ...

(Spoken, aside.) "Logic cannot make a U-turn so easily"

The creep of a superman with that mouth said,

in an instant putting his chin in his hand like a dwarf.

Alchemy to Saint-German.

The art of forming the eye to Merleau-Ponty.

To who[m] the art of forming the body?

As time goes by the virgin becomes an old woman,

if still time goes by

who knows the U-turn secret

of an old woman becoming a virgin?

OLD WOMAN AND KAI: (Together:) More than anybody, the body!

This text makes clear the absurdity of Kara's text and his obsession with the body.

== Death ==
Kara died on 4 May 2024, at the age of 84.

== Filmography ==
=== Actor ===
Hanchô: Jinnansho Azumihan (TV Series, episode 4.1), 2011

Ekrio (TV Movie), 2009

The Woman Prosecutor of Kyōto (TV Series, episode 4.7), 2007

Dreaming of Light (as Jūrō Kara), 2005

Yoru o Kakete, 2002

Kita no Kuni Kara 2002 Yuigon (TV Movie), 2002

Dr. Akagi (as Umemoto), 1998

Umihoozuki (as Haida), 1995

800 Two Lap Runners (as Yasu-san), 1994

Rasuto Furankenshutain, 1991

Jazz Daimyo (as Kyunosuke), 1986

Yasha-ga-ike (as Denkichi), 1979

The Boxer, 1977

Kyōfu Gekijō Umbalance (TV Series), 1973

Demons (as Sango),1971

Zenigeba, 1970

Violated Angels (as The Handsome Boy), 1967

Summer (as Yoshihide Ôtsuru), 1956

=== Writer ===
Dreaming of Light (novel "Garasu no Tsukai" - as Jūrō Kara) / (screenplay - as Jūrō Kara), 2005

Nonki na Neesan (novel), 2004

Genji Monogatari: Asaki Yume Mishi (written by), 2000

Umihoozuki, 1995

Namidabashi (writer), 1983

Violated Angels, 1967

=== Director ===
Genkai-Nada, 1976

=== Self ===
The Shiatorikaru: Juro Kara and His Stagework (Documentary, as himself), 2007

Gekiteki Document Report '78-'79 (Documentary, as himself), 1979

Diary of a Shinjuku Thief (as himself/singer), 1969

== Honours ==
- Person of Cultural Merit (2021)
