= Toshio Hosokawa =

Japanese composer (born 1955)

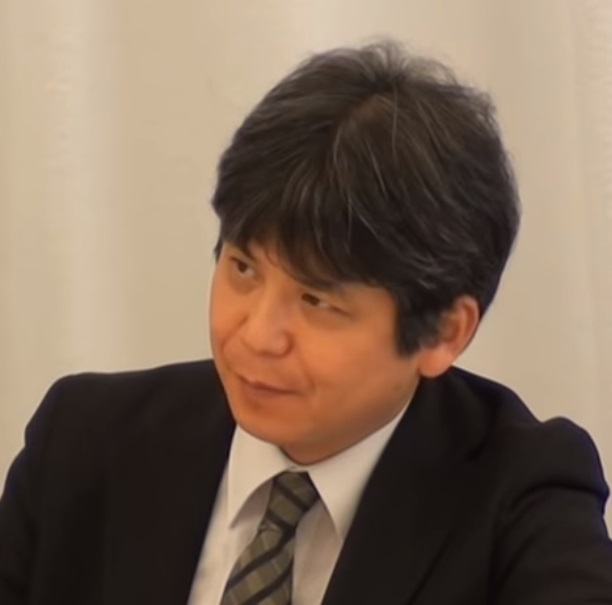
- Hosokawa in 2011
- Born: 23 October 1955 (age 71); Hiroshima, Japan
- Education: Berlin University of the Arts; Hochschule für Musik Freiburg
- Occupation: Composer
- Awards: Rheingau Musik Preis; Suntory Music Award; BBVA Foundation Frontiers of Knowledge Award

Toshio Hosokawa (細川 俊夫, Hosokawa Toshio; born 23 October 1955) is a Japanese composer of contemporary classical music.

Internationally active as one of the leading composers of contemporary music, he has received numerous commissions from major orchestras, music festivals, and opera houses in Japan and abroad.

== Career ==
Hosokawa was born in Hiroshima on 23 October 1955. His grandfather was a master of ikebana (Japanese flower arrangement), and his mother practiced the koto, although Hosokawa initially found traditional Japanese performing arts "boring". Having begun studying the piano at an early age, he decided to become a composer at the age of 15 after hearing a recording of Tōru Takemitsu's November Steps. The following year, he moved to Tokyo and enrolled at the high school affiliated with Kunitachi College of Music. He subsequently continued his studies in composition at Kunitachi College of Music. After being deeply impressed by a work by Isang Yun that he heard at a concert, he decided to study in Germany. In 1976, he entered the Berlin University of the Arts, where he studied composition with Yun. During his studies, he won first prize in both the composition competition commemorating the centenary of the Berlin Philharmonic and the Valentino Bucchi International Composition Competition. From 1983, he studied composition with Klaus Huber and musical analysis with Brian Ferneyhough at the Hochschule für Musik Freiburg. In 1985, on Huber's recommendation, he spent six months in Tokyo studying traditional Japanese music. He graduated in 1987 and returned to Japan. In 1980, he first took part in the Darmstädter Ferienkurse, including the performance of his compositions. He lectured there regularly beginning in 1990. In the following years, he became known internationally and received several commissions.

During his studies in Berlin, Hosokawa met Tōru Takemitsu at the Berlin Festival Weeks in 1981, marking the beginning of a lasting friendship. Takemitsu subsequently commissioned Hosokawa's Neben dem Fluss (1982) for the "Music Today" festival, where it received its world premiere by harpist Ayako Shinozaki. After returning to Japan in 1987, Hosokawa developed relationships with Japanese intellectuals and artists, including Arata Isozaki, Kenzaburō Ōe, Tadashi Suzuki, Yūjirō Nakamura, and Hiroshi Ichikawa. Through these exchanges, he deepened his knowledge of contemporary art, philosophy, and religion.

Hosokawa has composed numerous operas. His first opera, The Vision of Lear, directed by Tadashi Suzuki, received its world premiere at the Munich Biennale in 1998. This was followed by Hanjo, directed by Anne Teresa De Keersmaeker and conducted by Kazushi Ono, which premiered at the Festival d'Aix-en-Provence in 2004; Matsukaze, directed by Sasha Waltz and conducted by Pablo Heras-Casado, premiered at La Monnaie in Brussels in 2011; Stilles Meer, directed by Oriza Hirata and conducted by Kent Nagano, premiered in Hamburg in 2015; Futari Shizuka, directed by Hirata and conducted by Matthias Pintscher, premiered in Paris in 2016 in a production involving the Ensemble intercontemporain; Erdbeben. Träume, directed by Jossi Wieler and conducted by Sylvain Cambreling, premiered in Stuttgart in 2018; and Natasha, directed by Christian Räth and conducted by Kazushi Ono, premiered at the New National Theatre Tokyo in 2025.

Hosokawa's works have been performed by major orchestras and ensembles in Japan and abroad, including the Berlin Philharmonic, Vienna Philharmonic, Cleveland Orchestra, NHK Symphony Orchestra, Tokyo Metropolitan Symphony Orchestra, Ensemble intercontemporain, and Klangforum Wien. His music has been conducted by Seiji Ozawa, Kazushi Ono, Jun Märkl, Sylvain Cambreling, Kent Nagano, Simon Rattle, and Paavo Järvi, among others. It has also been performed by numerous internationally active musicians, including pianists Momo Kodama and Tomoki Kitamura; violinists Irvine Arditti and Daishin Kashimoto; violist Nobuko Imai; flautists Pierre-Yves Artaud, Emmanuel Pahud, and Yukie Ueno; harpist Naoko Yoshino; shō player Mayumi Miyata; and saxophonist Masanori Oishi.

In 1989, he cofounded the annual Akiyoshidai International Contemporary Music Seminar and Festival in Yamaguchi and was its artistic director until 1998. He was also the artistic director of the Japanese Takefu International Music Festival in Fukui starting in 2001. The festivals are meeting places for musicians from Asian and Western music traditions in concerts and seminars. Hosokawa served as a visiting professor at the Tokyo College of Music from 2001 to 2025. He has also held a visiting professorship at Elisabeth University of Music and an invited professorship at Kunitachi College of Music.

Hosokawa was a member of the Academy of Arts, Berlin from 2001. He did research in 2006/07 and 2008/09 at the Institute for Advanced Study (Wissenschaftskolleg) in Berlin. He was invited to be composer in residence at festivals such as the Venice Biennale, in both 1995 and 2001; the Lucerne Festival in 2000; musica viva in Munich in 2001; Musica Nova in Helsinki in 2003; and the Warsaw Autumn in 2005 and 2007. Since 2012, he is artistic director of the Suntory Hall International Program for Music Composition.

== Musical style ==
Hosokawa's musical style developed against the background of two artistic cultures: Western music and traditional Japanese music and art. While maintaining a strong interest in Western music before the twentieth century, including Bach, Beethoven, and Schubert, he was also influenced by postwar European composers such as Luigi Nono, Helmut Lachenmann, and Klaus Huber. The music and thought of Tōru Takemitsu were another major influence. During the early years of his studies in Germany, Hosokawa concentrated primarily on Western contemporary music, but his encounters with Isang Yun and Huber led him to rediscover Japanese traditional culture and to study traditional Japanese music, including gagaku and Noh. Drawing on these experiences, he developed a distinctive musical language rooted in both Western music and Japanese traditional culture. Several concepts recur frequently in Hosokawa's discussions of his own music; some of the most important are outlined below.

=== 'Calligraphy', 'line', and 'song' ===
Hosokawa conceives of his music as "calligraphy of space and time", associating calligraphy with 'song' and the idea of a core melodic line. This conception is rooted in an understanding of melody in East Asian music that he acquired through his studies with Isang Yun. In this view, melody is not constructed by combining individual notes; rather, a single tone emerges from silence, develops and transforms like a line drawn with a calligraphy brush, and eventually fades away. Glissando, vibrato, and tone color changes are understood as expressions of this process, reflecting the 'life' of a single tone. Hosokawa has also stated that his conception of the 'line' was influenced by Japanese calligraphy, placing particular emphasis on the blank space surrounding the brushstroke. Just as a line in calligraphy stands out against the surrounding blank space sound and silence are interdependent in Hosokawa's music, with sound acquiring its expressive power through silence. An early work exploring the process of drawing a calligraphic line within musical space is "Sen I" (1984) for solo flute. In this work, slurs extending from rests to notes express the process by which sound emerges from silence. This conception of calligraphy and the line is closely connected to Hosokawa's idea of 'song'. He has stated that "the foundation of my music is the calligraphic line of sound, which I call 'song'" and further declared that "the essence of my music is 'song'". In "Vertical Song" (1995), Hosokawa explores the idea of a 'song' rising vertically through time. In "Lied" (2007), he conceives of the flute as an extension of the human voice, presenting what he calls the "archetypal form of song" as a "song without words" (German: Lieder ohne Worte).

=== 'Womb' and 'mother sound' ===
Hosokawa's concepts of 'calligraphy', 'line', and 'song' are thus closely interconnected, describing the process by which a single sound emerges from silence, undergoes transformation, and eventually fades back into silence. Hosokawa refers to the background from which this sound emerges as the 'womb' (botai). He began to place greater emphasis on this concept in the late 1980s as he deepened his engagement with gagaku, conceiving of the melodies of the ryūteki and hichiriki as emerging from a 'womb' formed by silence or the sustained tones of the shō. He also associates the relationship between the melodies of the ryūteki and hichiriki and the sustained tones of the shō in gagaku with the relationship "between humanity and nature, and between humanity and the universe". He has extended this conception to works for solo instruments and orchestra, including concertos, such as Landscape III (1993), the Saxophone Concerto (1998/99), and the Voyage series (Voyage I–X, 1997–2009). Furthermore, he refers to the sustained sound that forms this background as the 'mother sound' (botai onkyō) and has developed a compositional technique in which the music unfolds around a central pitch or chord. More recently, Hosokawa has also described such sustained sounds as a "tunnel of sound". As a central pitch, Hosokawa frequently used F♯, which he described as "my tonality and the fundamental pitch of my body". In 2012, however, he stated that he had also begun to use E♭. Many of his works also employ a central chord referred to by scholars as the 'mother chord' (botai waon). The term derives from the German Mutterakkord, which Hosokawa himself has used, although its Japanese equivalent is employed primarily by scholars and is not always clearly distinguished from the concept of 'mother sound'. One specific form of this chord consists of the pitches C–F♯–G–D♭. Containing two perfect fifths, it has been associated with the aitake (chordal formations) of the shō in gagaku, as well as with the fourth movement of Anton Webern's Six Bagatelles for String Quartet, Op. 9. Hosokawa frequently combines this chord with its transposition down a minor third (E–A–B♭–E♭) and derives new chords and melodic materials from the intervals contained in these chords. Together, the two chords form an eight-note collection corresponding to the octatonic scale (Olivier Messiaen's second mode of limited transposition). This pitch organization has played an important role in Hosokawa's works since the mid-1990s.

=== Yin and yang ===
Hosokawa regards the concept of yin and yang, in which two contrasting elements complement one another rather than negate each other, thereby forming a unified musical cosmos, as one of the fundamental principles of his compositional thought. This concept was influenced by his teacher Isang Yun, whose idea of a "musical cosmos of yin and yang" Hosokawa identifies as one of the "central concerns of his compositional principles." In Hosokawa's works, yin and yang manifest themselves through contrasting elements such as light and shadow, male and female, high and low registers, and loud and soft dynamics. These elements "coexist, complement, and unite with one another without destroying each other, thereby creating cosmic harmony." This principle appears in various forms throughout his compositions. For example, musicologist Yayoi Uno Everett observes that in Hiroshima: Voiceless Voice (1989/2000–01), "the duality of yin and yang manifests itself within each movement" while also shaping the large-scale structure that unifies the work's five movements. According to Everett, the first movement, "Preludio 'Night'", the third movement, "Winter Voice", and the fifth movement, "Temple Bells Voice", represent the introspective and shadowy aspects of nature (yin). By contrast, the second movement, "Death and Resurrection," which incorporates a collage of texts concerning the atomic bombing, and the fourth movement, "Signs of Spring," which heralds "spring and the power of rebirth," correspond to the extroverted and luminous aspects (yang). The work as a whole is thus structured through the alternation and interaction of yin and yang. In the opera Matsukaze (2011), the two sisters, the "frenzied" Matsukaze and the "calm and rational" Murasame, are conceived as yin and yang, representing "two aspects of a single woman." Similarly, in Light and Darkness (2020/2021) for shō and saxophone, Hosokawa combines "repetitions of simple melodic fragments" played by the two instruments, as though "weaving threads of song." By interweaving "bright and dark intervals" and "ascending and descending melodic figures," he seeks to create a "cosmos of yin and yang."

=== Verticality and Temple Bells ===
"Verticality" is regarded as an important keyword characterizing Hosokawa's music. This concept is particularly prominent in his works and writings from the 1980s and 1990s, and appears explicitly in titles such as Vertical Song I (1995) and Vertical Time Study I–III (1992–94). In Vertical Time Study, rather than developing music along a horizontal axis of time, as in Western music, Hosokawa explores a conception of time inspired by "the dynamic movements of the tsuzumi (hand drum) in Noh theatre" and "the cyclical movement of inhalation and exhalation in the playing of the shō". In this conception, vertical strokes that cut through individual moments are repeated in a circular pattern. The concept of verticality is also closely connected to Hosokawa's approach to listening deeply to the resonance unfolding within each individual sound, rather than treating sounds merely as elements in a temporal sequence. In In die Tiefe der Zeit (Into the Depths of Time, 1995), he stated that he sought to perceive "each individual sound and voice as the resonance of a Buddhist temple bell" and to evoke "the vertical depth of a chaotic world before the emergence of words". The Japanese Buddhist temple bell (bonshō) is a recurring motif in Hosokawa's writings from the late 1990s. He regarded its resonance as a model for his musical conception, referring to this approach as his "temple bell style". In Ferne-Landschaft II (1996), inspired by the sounds of Japanese temple bells struck at long intervals, the resonance of a single bell emerges from the background, and its reverberations mingle with those of other bells to create new sonorities. The bell is represented by "a brief, violently swelling orchestral tutti," from which softer sounds gradually emerge like distant echoes, forming a background suggestive of "air" or "fog". Hosokawa also considers the sound of distant bells capable of evoking memories of the past while opening up an unknown world of sound. This conception of the temple bell can also be observed in Hiroshima: Voiceless Voice (1989–2001). In the fifth movement, "Temple Bells Voice" (2001), Hosokawa evokes the resonance of a temple bell submerged at the bottom of the sea, inspired by a haiku by Matsuo Bashō: "No moon tonight. The sound of the temple bell sinks to the bottom of the sea." He describes the movement as "music of prayer" and "music based on the temple bell style".

=== Shaman ===
In recent years, Hosokawa has frequently used the term "shaman" (miko, or Shinto priestess). He conceives of performers as shamans who mediate, through sound, between the human world and nature or the cosmos, as well as between the living and the dead or otherworldly realms. Particularly since Matsukaze (2010), Hosokawa has described his music as having acquired a ceremonial form in which performers act as shamans or priestess-like figures, communicating with a transcendent world through singing and performing, thereby bringing about a purification of the soul. In The Raven (2012), the female singer is conceived as a shaman who communicates with the dead and mysterious realms, while in Three Angel Songs (2014), the soprano is intended to sing not only as an angel but also as a shaman. In the Violin Concerto "Prayer" (2023), the soloist represents a shaman, while the orchestra embodies the cosmos and nature extending both within and beyond the soloist. The work depicts a process in which the cosmos responds to or resists the soloist's calls, until the two eventually become one. This relationship between soloist and orchestra is closely connected to the concepts of "song" and the relationship between humanity and nature or the cosmos discussed above. The idea of the shaman can also be observed in many of Hosokawa's recent works, including Ceremony (2021–22) and Natasha (2025).

=== 'The sea' and 'flowers' ===
Images of nature, such as the sea and flowers, frequently play an important role in Hosokawa's music. The relationship between nature and humanity is one of the central themes of his compositions. Hosokawa has stated that, before the 2011 Great East Japan Earthquake, the ultimate theme of his music was to "become one with nature and dissolve into it". The sea is one of the most significant images reflecting this view of nature. The philosopher and aesthetician Nobuyuki Kakigi has observed that, for Hosokawa, who was "born in Hiroshima and grew up gazing at the island-studded Seto Inland Sea," the seascape can be regarded as the "primordial landscape of his compositions". Ferne-Landschaft III -Seascapes of Fukuyama- (1996) is closely associated with this primordial landscape, and Hosokawa himself has described it as the "first piece about the sea" that he composed. Works such as Seascapes – Night (1997) and Seascape – Daybreak (1998) represent further developments of Ferne-Landschaft III. In Circulating Ocean (2005), Hosokawa conceives of sound as water and seeks to express its flow and transformation through music. The cycle of water, from the sea to clouds, rain, and storms, and eventually back to the sea, is associated not only with natural phenomena but also with the cycle of life. Following the Great East Japan Earthquake and the Fukushima Daiichi nuclear disaster, however, Hosokawa's attitude toward nature underwent a change. He has explained that works such as Stilles Meer (2016) address the destruction of nature itself by human activity. Flowers are another recurring image of nature in Hosokawa's music. Particularly since the 2000s, he has composed numerous works exploring the themes of flowers and blossoming. Hosokawa has attributed his interest in flowers to several influences: his grandfather was a master of ikebana (Japanese flower arrangement); Zeami, the medieval theorist of Noh theatre, compared the finest performers to flowers; and flowers have traditionally been among the most important subjects of Japanese poetry. In Blossoming (2006–2007/2009) for string quartet, the sustained B-flat at the opening represents the surface of the water, while the low register symbolizes "what is happening beneath the water". From this underwater world, a lotus flower emerges and gradually unfolds into full bloom, a process closely connected to the musical development of the work. A similar process of growth and blossoming forms the central theme of concertos such as Lotus under the Moonlight: Homage to Mozart (2006) for piano and orchestra and Horn Concerto -Moment of Blossoming- (2010). In these works, the solo instrument symbolizes the lotus flower, while the orchestra represents water or nature. This relationship reflects the same conception of the relationship between humanity and nature, or between humanity and the cosmos, discussed above. In Die Lotosblume -hommage à Robert Schumann (2006) for mixed choir and percussion, Hosokawa explores the theme of the lotus in a vocal composition, setting Heinrich Heine's poem "Die Lotosblume," which Schumann had also set to music. Hosokawa has observed that the lotus, which appears in these works, is "the most revered flower in the Buddhist world of the East" and that "its blossoming resembles human prayer". He also associates the image of blossoming with the "blossoming" or "awakening" of human beings themselves. Thus, flowers and blossoming are not merely images of nature but serve as important symbols of the emergence of life from nature and the process leading toward human spiritual awakening.

== Vocal music ==
Hosokawa has composed numerous vocal works, including operas, monodramas, large-scale vocal compositions, and choral works. These are closely related to the concerns he explores in his instrumental music, such as the relationships between sound and silence, foreground and background, and humanity and nature, as well as his interest in "song" and the physicality of musical expression. The dramatic character created by contrasting musical gestures in his instrumental works also plays an important role in his operas and large-scale vocal compositions. One of the defining features of Hosokawa's stage works, including his operas and monodramas, is the influence of Japanese Noh theatre. Hosokawa is particularly interested in the integration of voice, bodily movement, instrumental music, and silence in Noh, and incorporates its conception of time and physicality into Western opera. In works such as Hanjo (2003–04) and Matsukaze (2010), dramatic tension is created through a limited number of characters, a slow unfolding of time, sustained tones, and repeated musical figures. At the same time, emphasis is placed not only on singing but also on the body that produces the voice and on movement on stage. This interest in corporeality is also reflected in the fact that these two works were staged by the choreographers Anne Teresa De Keersmaeker and Sasha Waltz, respectively. In Matsukaze, in particular, the physical expression of singers and dancers through Waltz's choreography constitutes an essential element of the production. The structure of Noh, in which the living and the dead, and the earthly world and the otherworld, intersect, is also reflected in various forms in his works. In Matsukaze and Futari Shizuka – The Maiden from the Sea (2017), the dead appear in the world of the living, while in The Raven (2011), a nonhuman being, the raven, intervenes in the human world. These works reflect Hosokawa's worldview, in which humanity is not regarded as the centre of existence but as part of a larger world encompassing the dead, nature, and other forms of being. Alongside this worldview, Hosokawa's vocal works frequently address themes of mourning and prayer for the dead, as well as contemporary social issues such as nuclear weapons, war, natural disasters including earthquakes and tsunamis, and environmental pollution. Having been born and raised in Hiroshima, Hosokawa has regarded the atomic bombing as an issue of particular personal significance, and the memory of Hiroshima and the atomic bombings forms an important background to his creative work. Hiroshima – Voiceless Voice (1989/2000–01), which expanded the two-movement Hiroshima Requiem (1989–92) into a five-movement work, takes the atomic bombing of Hiroshima as its subject. Similar concerns can be observed in Sternlose Nacht – Requiem für Jahreszeiten (2010), which juxtaposes the wartime destruction of Dresden and Hiroshima with the cyclical succession of the seasons. Other works reflecting related concerns include Stilles Meer, which addresses the loss caused by the 2011 Great East Japan Earthquake and tsunami, and Natasha (2023–25), which deals with contemporary issues including environmental pollution, natural disasters, and consumer society. These works are connected to Hosokawa's fundamental concern with the relationships between humanity and nature, and between humanity and the world. Thus, Hosokawa's vocal music brings together the reinterpretation of traditional Japanese theatre and music, particularly Noh, the exploration of the voice as rooted in the body and breath, encounters with the dead and the otherworld, and an engagement with contemporary social issues. In these works, the "voice" is not merely a means of conveying a narrative through words, but serves as a medium arising from the body and connecting the living and the dead, humanity and nature, the self and the other, and the earthly world and the otherworld.

== Composer-in-residence ==
- Tokyo Symphony Orchestra (1998–2007)
- Lucerne Festival (2000)
- Musica Nova Helsinki (2003)
- Acanthes International Composition Course (2003, Avignon)
- Schleswig-Holstein Musik Festival (2005)
- Deutsches Symphonie-Orchester Berlin (2006–2007)
- WDR Rundfunkchor Köln (2006–2008)
- Saarländischer Rundfunk "Mouvement. Musik im 21. Jahrhundert" (2008)
- Salzburg Biennale (2009)
- Rheingau Musik Festival (2009, Wiesbaden)
- Tongyeong International Music Festival (2012, 2019, South Korea)
- Composium (2012, Tokyo)
- Salzburg Festival, featured composer of "Salzburg Contemporary" (2013)
- Santiago de Compostela Contemporary Music Festival (2014, Spain)
- Netherlands Philharmonic Orchestra (2013–2014)
- Mozart Festival Würzburg (2015)
- Acht Brücken | Musik für Köln (2016, Cologne)
- Gstaad Menuhin Festival (2017, Switzerland)
- University of Toronto, New Music Festival (2019)
- AFEKT Festival (2019, Estonia)
- Musikfestival Bern 2020 (2020)
- Hiroshima Symphony Orchestra (2019–2021)
- Tonhalle-Orchester Zürich (2022)
- Musikene (2022, San Sebastián, Spain)
- Gaida Festival 2023 (2023, Vilnius, Lithuania)
- Valencia Orchestra (2025)

== Awards ==
Hosokawa has received several awards and honors, including:

- 1982: First prize in the composition competition which marked the 100th anniversary of the Berliner Philharmoniker
- 1982: Irino Prize for young composers
- 1984: Arion-Musikpreis
- 1985: Composition prize of the young generation in Europe
- 1988: Kyoto Music Prize
- 1998: Rheingau Musik Preis
- 1998: Duisburger Musikpreis
- 2001: musica viva-Preis of ARD and BMW
- 2007: Suntory Music Award
- 2008: Fifth Roche Commission
- 2021: Goethe Medal
- 2024: BBVA Foundation Frontiers of Knowledge Award

== Compositions ==
IRCAM has a detailed list of Hosokawa's works, also Schott Music, and several works are held by the German National Library:

=== Operas ===
Premiere	Title	Description	Libretto and source	Notes
19 April 1998, Gasteig / Munich Biennale	Vision of Lear	Opera in 2 acts, 105'	Tadashi Suzuki, after his stage play The Tale of Lear	
8 July 2004, Théâtre du Jeu de Paume / Festival d'Aix-en-Provence	Hanjo	Opera in one act, 80'	The composer, after the English translation by Donald Keene of the modern Noh play by Yukio Mishima	
3 May 2011, La Monnaie, Brussels	Matsukaze	Opera in one act, 80'	Hannah Dübgen, after the Noh play Matsukaze by Zeami	
17 March 2012, La Raffinerie, Brussels	The Raven	monodrama for soprano, 45'	Setting of Poe's The Raven	
24 January 2016, Staatsoper Hamburg	Stilles Meer	Opera in one act, 90'	Hannah Dübgen, after an original text by Oriza Hirata in the German translation by Dorothea Gasztner	
1 July 2018, Staatstheater Stuttgart	Erdbeben. Träume.	Opera in one act, 90'	Marcel Beyer, based on Das Erdbeben von Chili by Heinrich von Kleist	
August 2025, New National Theatre Tokyo	Natasha	Opera	based on Dantes Inferno	

=== Oratorio ===
- Voiceless Voice in Hiroshima for soloists, narrators, chorus, tape (ad lib.) and orchestra (1989/2001) after Matsuo Bashō, Paul Celan and the film Genbaku no Ko

=== Orchestral ===
- Ferne Landschaft I (1987)
- Ferne Landschaft II (1996)
- Ferne Landschaft III – Seascapes of Fukuyama (1996)
- Memory of the Sea – Hiroshima Symphony (1998)
- Seascapes – Daybreak (1998)
- Seascapes – Oita (1998)
- Circulating Ocean (2005)
- Wind from the Ocean (2006)
- Skyscape (2006–07)
- Danses imaginaires (2007)
- Woven Dreams (2009–10)
- Blossoming II (2011)
- Singing Garden in Venice for baroque orchestra (2011)
- Meditation – to the Victims of Tsunami 3.11 (2012)
- Uzu (2019)
- Sakura (2021)

=== Concertante ===
- Piano
  - Piano Concerto Ans Meer (1999)
  - Lotus under the Moonlight (Hommage à Mozart) for piano and orchestra (2006)
- Violin
  - Landscape III for violin and orchestra (1993)
  - Voyage I for violin and ensemble (1997)
  - Violin Concerto Genesis (2020)
- Viola
  - Voyage VI for viola and strings (2002)
- Cello
  - In die Tiefe der Zeit for cello, accordion and strings (1994)
  - Cello Concerto (1997)
  - Chant for cello and orchestra (2009)
  - Sublimation for cello and orchestra (2016)
- Woodwinds
  - Flute Concerto Per Sonare (1988)
  - Voyage II for bassoon and ensemble (1997)
  - Saxophone Concerto (1998)
  - Clarinet Concerto Metamorphosis (2000)
  - Voyage V for flute and chamber orchestra (2001)
  - Sorrow River for recorder and strings (2016)
  - Ceremony for flute and orchestra (2021–2022)
- Brass
  - Voyage III for trombone and ensemble (1997)
  - Voyage VII for trumpet and strings with percussion (2005)
  - Voyage VIII for tuba and ensemble (2006)
  - Horn Concerto Moment of Blossoming (2010)
  - Trumpet Concerto Im Nebel (2013)
- Traditional Japanese Instruments
  - Shō Concerto Cloud and Light (2008)
  - Voyage X for shakuhachi and ensemble (2009)
  - Autumn Wind for shakuhachi and orchestra (2011)
- Others
  - Voyage IV – Extasis for accordion and ensemble (2000)
  - Percussion Concerto Tabi-bito (2000)
  - Harp Concerto Re-turning (2001)
  - Voyage IX – Awakening for guitar and strings with percussion (2007)

=== Chamber ===
- for strings
  - String Quartet No. 2 Urbilder (1980)
  - Landscape I for string quartet (1992)
  - Landscape IV for string quintet (1993)
  - Duo for violin and cello (1998)
  - Silent Flowers for string quartet (1998)
  - Blossoming for string quartet (2007)
  - Kalligraphie for string quartet (2007)
  - Distant Voices for string quartet (2013)
  - Weaving Song for string quartet (2020)
- Dan-sô for piano trio (1984)
- Fragmente II for alto flute and string quartet (1989)
- Birds Fragments III for sho and bass flute (1990)
- Landscape II for harp and string quartet (1992)
- Vertical Time Study I for clarinet, cello and piano (1992)
- Landscape V for shō and string quartet (1993)
- Vertical Time Study II for tenor saxophone, piano and percussion (1993–94)
- Memory for piano trio (1996)
- Deep Silence (2002) for shō and accordion in Gagaku style
- Stunden-Blumen (Toki no Hana) for clarinet, violin, cello and piano (2008)
- Für Walter for soprano saxophone, piano and percussion ad libitum (2010)
- Piano Trio (2013)
- Ancient Voices – In memory of Wolfgang Schulz for wind quintet (2013)
- Water of Lethe for piano quartet (2016)

=== Instrumental ===
- Sen series
  - Sen I for flute (1986)
  - Sen II for cello (1986)
  - Sen III for sangen (1988)
  - Sen IV for organ (1990)
  - Sen V for accordion (1992)
  - Sen VI for percussion (1993)
  - Sen VII for bassoon (1995)
- Melodia for accordion (1979)
- Vertical Time Study III for violin and piano (1994)
- Vertical Song I for flute (1995)
- Atem-Lied for bass flute (1997)
- Slow Motion for accordion (2002)
- Reminiscence for marimba (2002)
- Serenade for guitar (2003)
- Lied for flute and piano (2007)
- Lied II for viola and piano (2008)
- Lied III for cello and piano (2007)
- Spell for violin (2010)
- Lullaby of Itsuki: from Japanese Folk Songs for violin and piano (2011)
- Threnody: To the victims of the Tōhoku 3.11 earthquake for viola (2011)
- Im Nebel for trumpet and piano (2016)
- Voice for trombone (2020)

=== Vocal ===
- Renka I for soprano and guitar (1986)
- Koto-uta for voice and koto (1999)
- Three Love Songs for voice and alto saxophone (2005)
- Klage for soprano and orchestra (2013)
- Drei Engel-Lieder for soprano and harp (2014)
- Nach dem Sturm for two sopranos and orchestra (2015)

=== Choral ===
- "Ave Maria for 16-part mixed choir a cappella" (1991)
