= Yose =

Japanese theatrical form

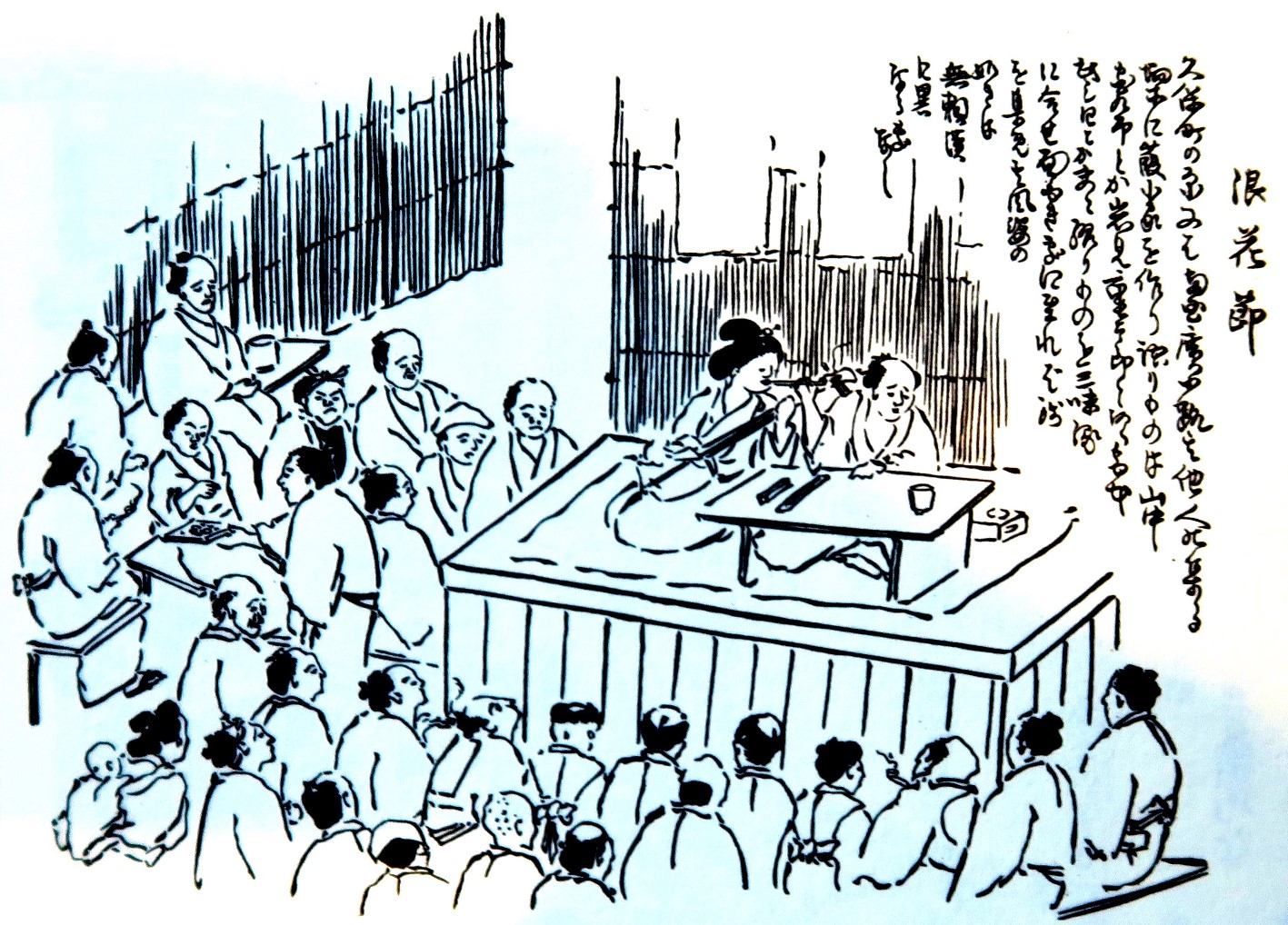
Drawing depicting a yose scene

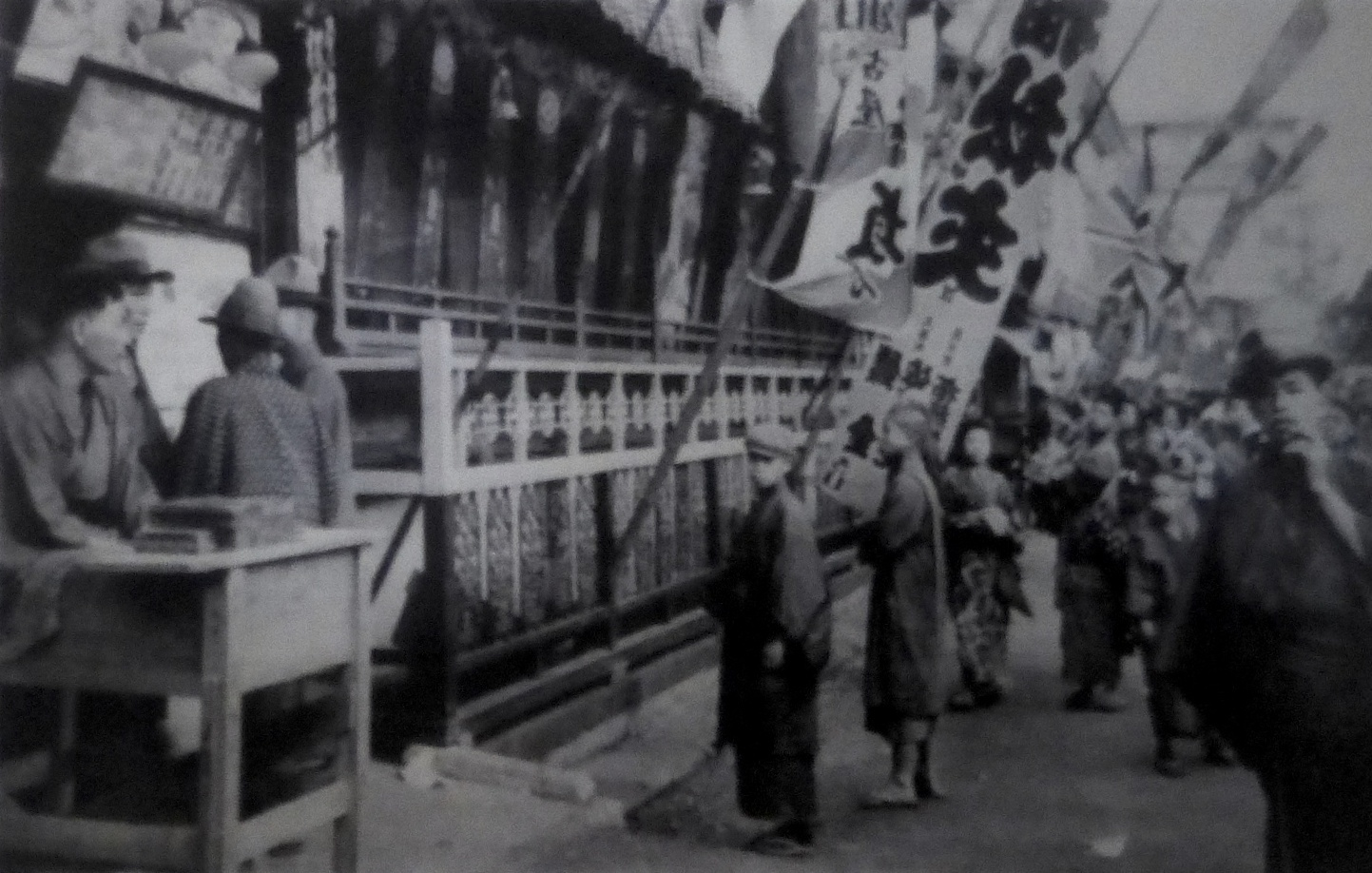
The Asakusa yose

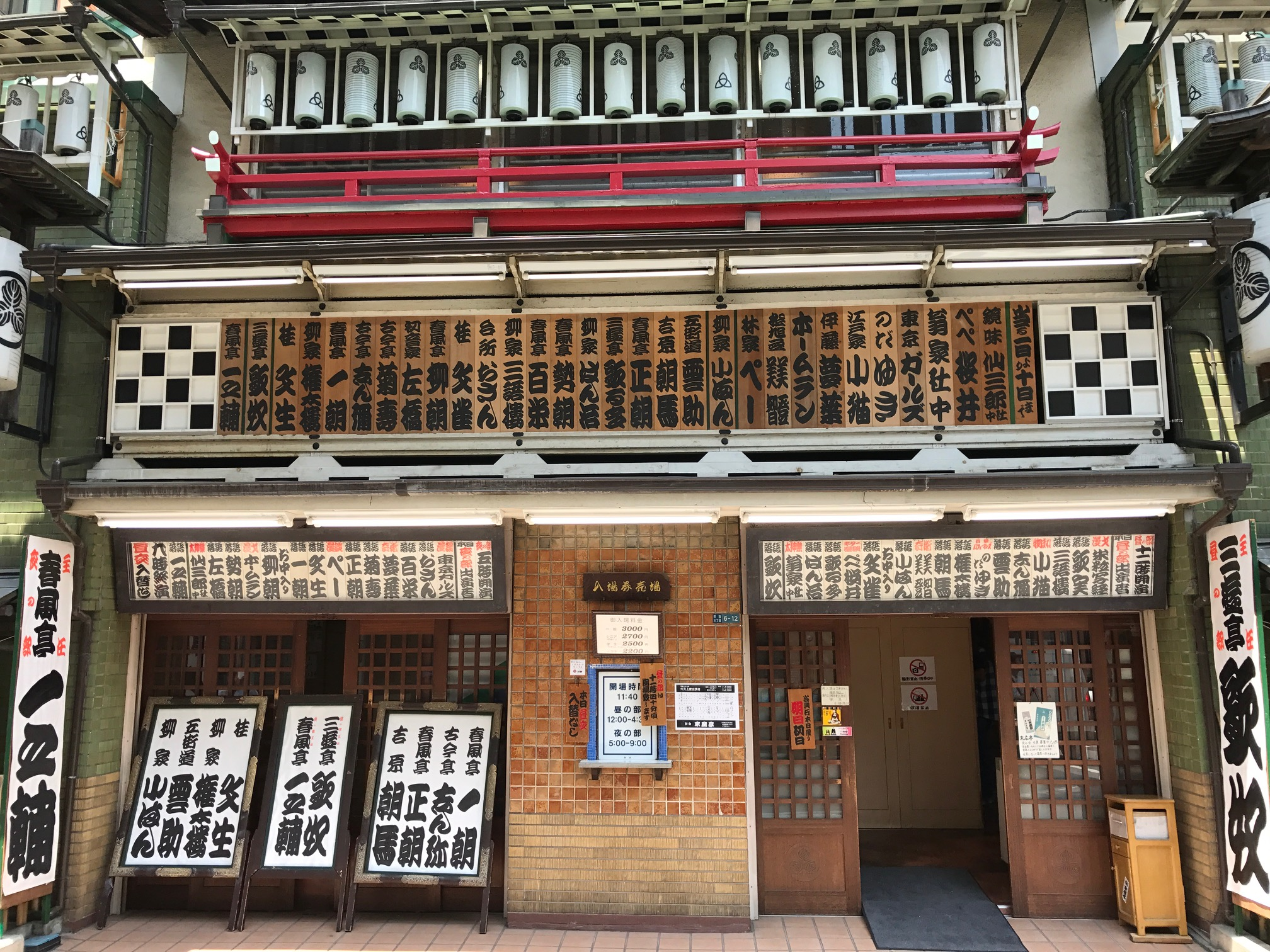
Suehiro-tei in Shinjuku

Yose (Japanese: 寄席) is a form of spoken vaudeville theatre of Japan cultivated since the 18th century. The term also refers to the exclusive theater where yose is held.

== History ==
The yose was a popular form of spoken theatre in the Edo period. The term is the shortened form of Hito yose seki (人寄せ席), roughly "Where people sit together". Towards the end of the Edo period, there were several hundred theatres, about one per district (町, chō). The entrance fee, the "wooden door penny" (木戸銭, Kido-zeni), was small.

A number of variants existed:

- "Narrative stories" (講談, Kōdan)
- "Emotional stories" (人情噺, Ninjō-banashi)
- "Comic stories" (落語, Rakugo)
- "Magic Arts" (手品, Tejina)
- "Shadow theatre" (写し絵, Utsushi-e)
- "Imitation of several people" (八人芸, Hachinin-gei)
- "Ghost Stories" (怪談, Kaidan)
- "Artful Tales" (芸屋噺)

and others.

The main direction was the kōdan, the narrative stories. The beginning goes back to the beginning of the Edo period, to the Taiheiki-yomi (太平記読), the recitation of the Taiheiki. In addition, there were military stories such as the "revenge stories" (仇討物, Adauchi-mono), "chivalric stories" (俠客物, Kyōgaku-mono), "civic stories" (世話物), etc. When this form of lecture developed, it was called Kōshaku (講釈), roughly "Explanatory Lectures", and was only common in places where the bushi (武士), i.e. the Japanese nobility, played a role in which the common people were interested. The lecturers, called hanashi-ka (噺家), corresponded to the rakugo narrators of the present day.

A well-known lecturer at the end of the Edo period into the Meiji era was San'yūtei Enchō (三遊亭 圓朝; 1839-1900), who was a master of all variants and laid the foundation for modern performance practice. He published his lectures under the title "Peony Lantern" (牡丹燈籠, Botan dōrō) and Shiobara Tasuke (塩原多助). The later Kaidan botan dōrō (怪談牡丹燈籠) from 1884 was also successful, with Enchō's lectures having been taken down in shorthand.

Small theatre spaces typically seating 200 people existed for performances. Most theatres operated on an Iromonoseki (色物席) basis, i.e., after a series of younger lecturers, the master performed. Around 1900, 70 such theatres were still active, of which the Suehiro-tei (末廣亭) in Shinjuku district, the Tachibana-tei (立花亭) in Kanda and the Suzumoto-tei (鈴本亭) in Ueno were the best known. They were broadcast on radio from the 1920s onwards, while most yose theatres later had to close due to the surge in cinema competition. So the yose lives on today on television and radio and in special live broadcasts. Other forms include Manzai (漫才) and Naniwa-bushi (浪花節).

== Yosemoji ==
Example of Yosemoji

Edomoji (Japanese: 江戸文字; furigana: えどもじ) are Japanese lettering styles invented for advertising during the Edo period. The name yosemoji (寄席文字(よせもじ)) literally means "letters for yose". It was used for posters and flyers. Unlike other calligraphic styles, yosemoji allows and even encourages multiple brushstrokes in order to fill in the characters as much as possible.

== Bibliography ==
- Hanabuki Kazuo (ed.): Yose. in: O-Edo mono-shiri zukan. Shufu-to-seikatsusha, 2000. ISBN 4-391-12386-X. pp. 392.
- S. Noma (ed.): Yose. in: Japan. An Illustrated Encyclopedia. Kodansha, 1993, ISBN 4-06-205938-X, pp. 1755.
