= Voiceless Voice in Hiroshima =

Oratorio

- Oratorio by Toshio Hosokawa
- Composed: 1989, expanded in 2000
- Performed: 4 May 2001 Munich
- Scoring: soloist(s); narrator(s); choir; orchestra; (optional) tape

Voiceless Voice in Hiroshima is an oratorio by Toshio Hosokawa.

== History ==
Hosokawa was born in Hiroshima in 1955, 10 years after the atomic bombing of the city during World War II. In 1989, Hosokawa completed this oratorio, reflecting on the bombings, and he revised it in 2000.

The text was compiled by Arata Osada using texts by Matsuo Bashō and Paul Celan and from the film Children of Hiroshima (Genbaku no Ko) in English, German and Japanese. Hosokawa scored the work for vocal soloists, a narrator, choir, orchestra, and (optional) tape.

The oratorio was premiered on 4 May 2001 at the Herkulessaal in Munich by contralto Nathalie Stutzmann, speakers Theresa Kohlhäufl, Tim Schwarzmaier, and August Zirner, and choir and orchestra of Bayerischer Rundfunk conducted by Sylvain Cambreling. The choir was prepared by Rupert Huber. It was recorded by the same performers. The music was published by Schott.

== Music and structure ==
The work is structured in five section which can be performed individually:

1. Preludio "Night" (1989)
2. Death and Resurrection (1989, 2001)
3. Winter Voice (2001)
4. Signs of Spring (2001)
5. Temple Bells Voice (2001)

Hosokawa used extreme musical language, a "brutal tonal world" of brass and percussion and a "colourful chordal landscape" in the choir.

== Recordings ==
- Hosokawa, Toshio; Osada, Arata; Celan, Paul; Matsuo, Bashō; Stutzmann, Nathalie; Kohlhäufl, Theresa; Schwarzmaier, Tim; Zirner, August; Cambreling, Sylvain; Bayerischer Rundfunk (2002), Voiceless voice in Hiroshima (in German), [Vienne]: Col legno, OCLC 122309154
