= Misako Watanabe =

Japanese actress (born 1932)

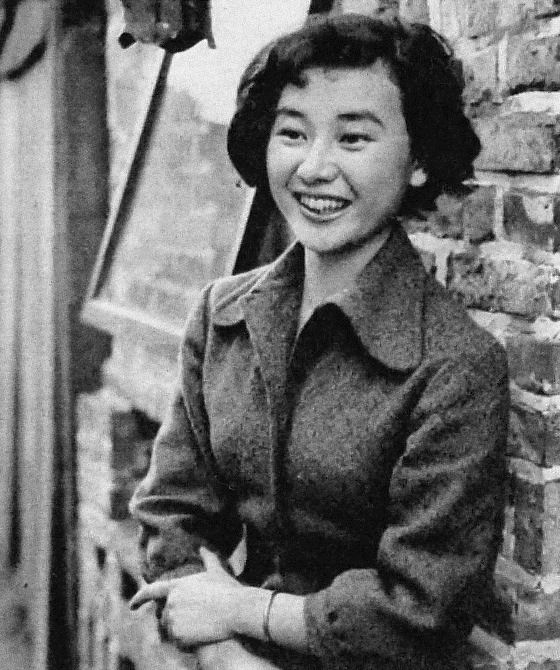
- Misako Watanabe in 1956
- Born: October 23, 1932 (age 93); Azabu, Tokyo, Japan
- Occupation: Actress
- Years active: 1953–present

Misako Watanabe (渡辺 美佐子, Watanabe Misako; born 23 October 1932) is a Japanese stage, film and television actress.

== Career ==
A graduate of the Haiyuza Theatre Company, Watanabe gave her film debut in Tadashi Imai's Tower of Lilies (1953) before becoming a contract player at the Nikkatsu film studios. She appeared in almost 100 films of directors like Shōhei Imamura, Masahiro Shinoda and Masaki Kobayashi.

She received the Blue Ribbon Award for Best Supporting Actress for her performance in the 1958 Endless Desire. In 1997 she was awarded a Medal of Honor with Purple Ribbon and in 2004 the Order of the Rising Sun.

== Filmography ==
Date	Work	Role	Notes	Ref.
1953	Tower of Lilies	Yoshiko Tomiyasu		
1958	Endless Desire	Shima		
1959	The Wandering Guitarist			
1962	Being Two Isn't Easy	Aunt Setsuko		
1963	Brave Records of the Sanada Clan	Musasabi No Ogiri		
1963	Bushido, Samurai Saga	Yasu, Sajiemon's wife		
1964	Kwaidan	Second Wife (segment "Kurokami")		
1965	With Beauty and Sorrow	Fumiko Ōki		
1967	The Wife of Seishu Hanaoka	Kuriko		
1973	Long Journey into Love	Kaito Takeno		
1982	Tattoo Ari	Sadako Takeda		
1983–1984	Oshin (TV series)	Madam Taka Hasegawa	Asadora	
1990	Tugumi	Masako		
2010	Shiawase no Pan	Aya		
2013	The Great Passage	Take		
2024	Route 29			
