= Brave Records of the Sanada Clan =

- DVD cover
- Directed by: Tai Kato
- Written by: Yoshiyuki Fukuda; Ryūnosuke Ono; Fumio Konami
- Starring: Kinnosuke Nakamura; Misako Watanabe; Jerry Fujio; Mickey Curtis; Minoru Chiaki; Kei Satō; Mikijirō Hira
- Cinematography: Osamu Furuya
- Edited by: Shintarō Miyamoto
- Music by: Hikaru Hayashi
- Distributed by: Tōei
- Release date: 2 June 1963 (Japan)
- Running time: 90 minutes
- Country: Japan
- Language: Japanese

Brave Records of the Sanada Clan (Japanese: 真田風雲録, Hepburn: Sanada fūunroku; aka Sasuke and His Comedians) is a Japanese film directed by Tai Kato in 1963. It is a jidaigeki musical about Sasuke Sarutobi and the Sanada Ten Braves who, under the leadership of Yukimura Sanada, try to defend Toyotomi Hideyori during the siege of Osaka Castle by the Tokugawa armies. Yoshiyuki Fukuda helped adapt his own stage play for the screen.

== Cast ==
- Kinnosuke Yorozuya as Sasuke
- Misako Watanabe
- Minoru Chiaki as Sanada Yukimura
