= Slow Motion (Hosokawa) =

2002 composition for accordion

Slow Motion is a composition for accordion by Toshio Hosokawa written in 2002 for Teodoro Anzellotti, who premiered it in Vienna's Konzerthaus on April 3 that year. Lasting circa 13 minutes, it is a contemplative work inspired in gagaku and its "integration of the dancer's bodies with the earth", with the accordion emulating a shō playing a nocturnal dance in the moonlight.

== Discography ==
- Teodoro Anzellotti. Winter & Winter Records, 2007.
