= Vision of Lear =

1998 opera by Toshio Hosokawa

- Opera by Toshio Hosokawa
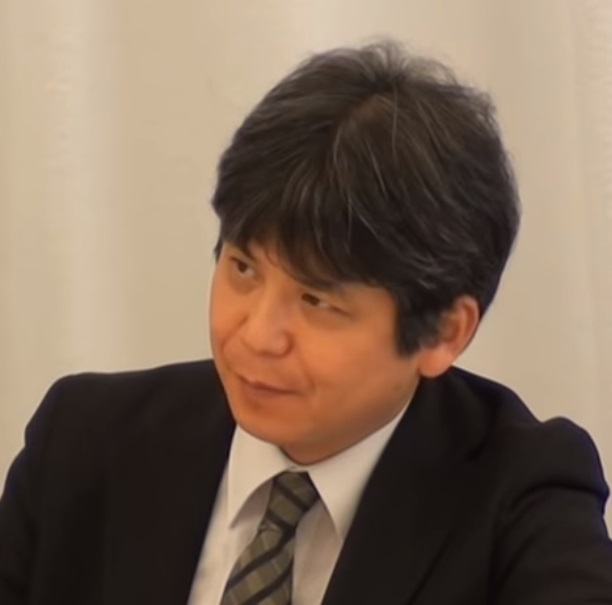
- The composer on VioWorld in 2011
- Librettist: Tadashi Suzuki
- Language: English
- Based on: Shakespeare's King Lear
- Premiere: 19 April 1998; Gasteig, by Munich Biennale

Vision of Lear is the first opera by Toshio Hosokawa which premiered at the Munich Biennale in 1998. The opera in two acts is an adaptation of Shakespeare's King Lear, including elements from the traditional Japanese Noh theatre. The libretto was written in English by Tadashi Suzuki.

== History ==
Toshio Hosokawa composed his first opera in 1997 and 1998 on a commission of the City of Munich for its 1998 Munich Biennale. The libretto was written in English by Tadashi Suzuki, based on Shakespeare's play King Lear. The opera in two acts includes elements from the traditional Japanese Noh theatre.

The world premiere at the Carl-Orff-Saal of the Gasteig on 19 April 1998, as part of the festival, was staged by Suzuki who was also responsible for stage, costume, and lighting design. It was performed by the Xsemble Munich, conducted by Georges-Elie Octors, in a co-production of the Biennale and the Shizuoka Performing Arts Center. The UK premiere was given in the Linbury Studio of the Royal Opera House on 31 January 2002, staged by director Harry Ross and designer Mike Jardine, and conducted by Gregory Rose, with Nicholas Garrett in the title role.

== Roles ==
Roles, voice types, premier cast
Role	Voice type	Premiere cast 19 April 1998 Conductor: Georges-Elie Octors
Lear	bass	Nicholas Isherwood
Goneril	contralto	Annette Elster
Regan	high soprano	
Cordelia	soprano	
Alnany, Goneril's husband	low baritone	
Cornwall, Regan's husband	high baritone	
Edgar	baritone	
Edmund	tenor	
Gloucester	low baritone	
Oswald	tenor	

Supporting roles are: Servant/Captain/Gentleman, sung by one tenor, two nurses, played by actors, and an optional children's choir or female choir.

== Plot ==
The Lear story is framed by a situation in which a nurse reads from Shakespeare's play to an old man. His memories of his life, and the events in the drama connect. He has visions of bringing Goneril and Regan to court, and speaks in Lear's words to imagined figures from the drama. His life ends with a vision of Lear dying with Cordelia's corpse in his arms. The nurse keeps reading.
