= Ninjō =

Human feeling or compassion (Japanese)

Ninjō (人情; "human emotion or compassion") in Japanese, is human feeling that complements and opposes the value of giri, or social obligation, within the Japanese worldview. Broadly speaking, ninjō is said to be the human feeling that inescapably springs up in conflict with social obligation. As ninjō is a culture-specific term, the validity or importance of this concept is subject to a wide range of viewpoints, inextricably tied into one's perspective on nihonjinron, which compares Japan with other cultures to establish what is unique about the country.

== Concept ==
Ninjō is roughly translated as "human feeling" or "emotion" and could also be interpreted as a specific aspect of these terms such as generosity or sympathy towards the weak. The classic example of ninjō is that of a samurai who falls in love with an unacceptable partner (perhaps a person of lower social class or a member of an enemy clan). As a loyal member of his clan, he then becomes torn between the obligation to his feudal lord and his personal feelings, with the only possible resolution being shinjū or double love-suicide. This demonstrates how giri is superior to ninjō in the Japanese worldview since the latter could weaken an individual's devotion to his duty.

== See also ==
- Ren (philosophy)
- Yose
