= Utsushi =

The Japanese term, Utsushi (写) can be translated as, appropriation, emulation, inspiration, attribution, etc. However, the word Utsushi encompasses the meanings found in all the terms mentioned. An Utsushi can be a work where an artist is inspired by a traditional motif and incorporates the design in a work of art or the artist is emulating a masterpiece of the past to surpass the original subtly.

In Japan today, the meaning found in the term Utsushi is slowly fading and being misinterpreted or wrongly associated with the term, mozo (模造) which means to copy or reproduce. Utsushi is simply not copying or reproducing a masterpiece or motif from the past. Instead, Utsushi promotes a dialogue between the artist and the masters of the past, connecting past, present, and future.

== History and culture ==
The tradition of Utsushi has been part of the history of traditional Japanese art extending across numerous artistic fields, especially in calligraphy, painting, sculpture, architecture, lacquer, ceramics, textiles, metalwork, basketry, etc. Emulating or making an Utsushi of an existing work might be done for a variety of purposes. Appropriating the work of predecessors is one of the developmental methods in training artists across all ranges of Japanese artistic genres. Through the process of replicating the techniques and style of a noted or established master, the artist experiences firsthand the technology, material requirements, and aesthetic understanding necessary in producing an artwork of the utmost quality.

For nearly a millennium prior to the invention of printing or photographic reproduction, the process of multiple recension was the primary method of preserving literary, religious, and artistic tradition. Thus, copying was the purview not of artists in training but of seasoned veterans.

Additionally, the process of Utsushi can be seen in Japanese poetry. Honka Dori (本歌取り), or allusive variation, is a classical poetic technique that dates back to the Heian Period. Poets construct their skills through the study of works by past masters. Once the knowledge has been absorbed so deeply that it is part of the poets' psyche, then they may quote another poet's work into their own verse without losing individuality or creativity. Also the poet expects the reader to be well versed, and to understand both quotation and originality, where “a poetic work the added weight of tradition while preventing it from being a smug expression of personal conceit.”

== Chanoyu and Utsushi ==
Within the way of tea, a new perspective is cast upon Utsushi especially when objects that display an acute sensibility of the original and its reinterpretation are displayed and used in the tea room. The aesthetic quality is highly valued where it brings both the newly conceived version and the reinterpreted into a sharper perspective. Moreover, objects favored by succeeding masters of the various schools in the way of tea have a close connection with the notion of Utsushi. Over the history of the way of tea, certain designs and objects preferred by specific masters have been emulated where individuals can enjoy and be familiar with the object in a different manner.

== See also ==
- Yose
