= Makoto Satō (theatre) =

Japanese theatre director and playwright

- 佐藤信; Satō Makoto
- Born: 23 August 1943 (age 83); Shinjuku, Tokyo, Japan
- Occupations: Theatre director, playwright
- Writing career
- Years active: 1965–present
- Genre: Angura

Makoto Satō (佐藤信, Satō Makoto; born 23 August 1943) is a Japanese avant-garde theatre director and playwright. He was at the forefront of the Angura ("underground") theatre movement in Japan.

== Early life and education ==
Makoto Satō was born in Shinjuku, Tokyo, on 23 August 1943. In 1965, he dropped out of Waseda University to complete Haiyuza Theatre Company's training program.

== Career ==
In 1966, Satō co-founded the Angura theatre troupe "Liberty Theatre" (自由劇場, Jiyū Gekijō) to perform Angura-style productions. The troupe staged its early productions in a tiny rented basement beneath a plate glass store, which it promoted as its "Underground Theater" (アンダーグラウンド・シアター, Andāguraundo Shiatā). This seems to have been the origin of the name "Angura," which was an abbreviation for "underground."

In the late 1960s, the Liberty Theatre merged with several other groups to eventually become the Black Tent Theatre, primarily under Satō's creative direction, which traveled around Japan staging productions in a large black tent and became one of the most successful and profitable Angura troupes.
