= Haiyuza Theatre Company =

Japanese theatre company

- 劇団俳優座; Gekidan Haiyūza
- Formation: 1944
- Type: Theatre group
- Purpose: Shingeki
- Location: Tokyo, Japan
- Website: haiyuza.net

The Haiyuza Theatre Company (劇団俳優座, Gekidan Haiyūza) is a Japanese theatre company based in Tokyo. Along with the Mingei Theatre Company and Bungakuza, it is considered one of the "Big Three" among Shingeki (new theatre) troupes.

== History ==
The Haiyuza Theatre Company was founded in February 1944 by ten theatre artists including Sugisaku Aoyama, Eitarō Ozawa, Teruko Kishi, Koreya Senda, Eijirō Tōno, Chieko Higashiyama and Sachiko Murase. The first official performance was Nikolai Gogol's The Government Inspector in March 1946. The group specialised in Shingeki, performing classical and contemporary Japanese and international plays by Yutaka Mafune, Chikao Tanaka, Kōbō Abe, Yushi Koyama, Shakespeare, Chekhov, Brecht, Tennessee Williams, Arthur Miller and others. In addition to stage work, the Haiyuza Theatre Company maintained an actors training school, founded in 1949 and disbanded in 1967. In 1954, the group opened its own theatre house in Roppongi, Minato Ward, Tokyo. It was renovated in 1980 and is now operated separately from the theatre group.

== Former Members (selected) ==
- Eijirō Tōno
- Koreya Senda
- Eitarō Ozawa
- Teruko Kishi
- Sugisaku Aoyama
- Koreya Senda
- Chieko Higashiyama
- Sachiko Murase
- Tatsuya Nakadai
- Mikijirō Hira
- Gō Katō
- Ichirō Nakatani
- Kin Sugai
- Kunie Tanaka
- Hisashi Igawa
- Yoshio Harada
- Atsuo Nakamura
- Etsuko Ichihara
- Michiko Otsuka

== Haiyuza Theatre Company School (selected) ==
- Makoto Satō
- Tsutomu Yamazaki
- Isao Kimura
- Kei Satō
- Shigeru Tsuyuguchi
- Makoto Satō
- Mikio Narita
- Ken Utsui
- Shoichi Ozawa
- Isao Natsuyagi
- Takeo Chii
- Taisaku Akino
- Takehiko Ono
- Gin Maeda
- Nobuyo Ōyama
- Hideyo Amamoto
- Kunio Murai
- Yoshio Tsuchiya
- Akiji Kobayashi
- Toshiya Fujita
- Kiwako Taichi
- Misako Watanabe
- Ikko Furuya
