= Lesnoy, Sverdlovsk Oblast =

Closed town in Sverdlovsk Oblast, Russia

Lesnoy Лесной
- Town
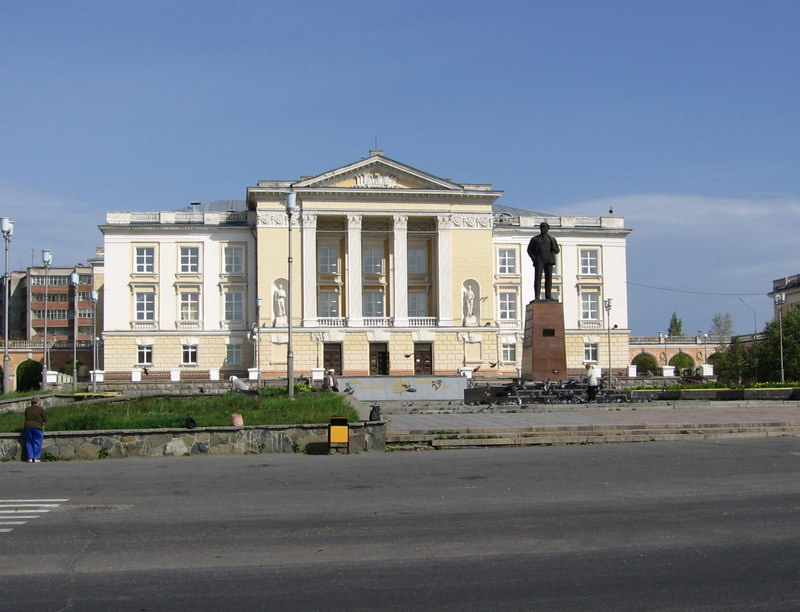
- House of Culture in Lesnoy

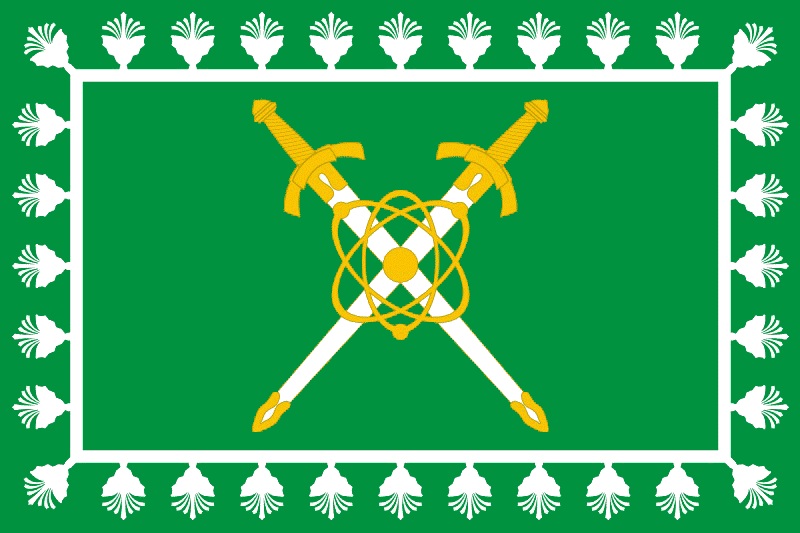
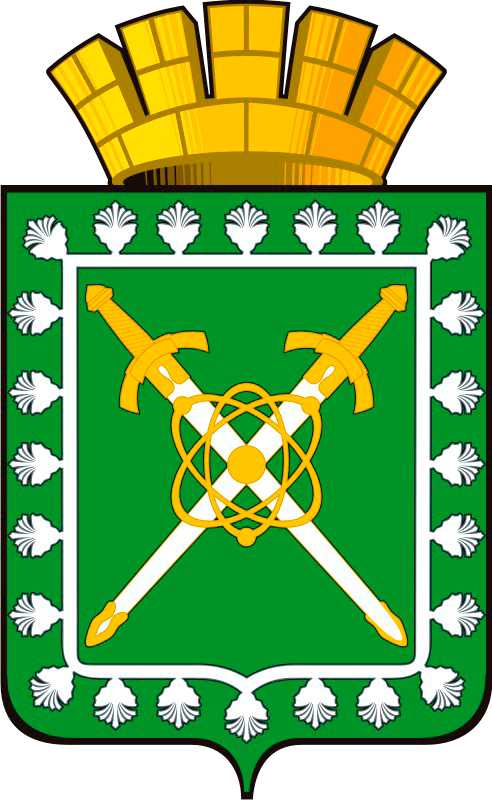
- Flag Coat of arms
- Interactive map of Lesnoy
- Location of Lesnoy Lesnoy (Sverdlovsk Oblast)
- Coordinates: 58°38′N 59°47′E
- Country: Russia
- Federal subject: Sverdlovsk Oblast
- Founded: 1947

Government
  - Mayor: Sergey Cherepanov
- Elevation: 200 m (660 ft)

Population (2010 Census)
  - Total: 50,363
  - Estimate (2025): 47,994 (−4.7%)
  - Rank: 316th in 2010

Administrative status
  - Subordinated to: closed administrative-territorial formation of Lesnoy
  - Capital of: closed administrative-territorial formation of Lesnoy

Municipal status
  - Urban okrug: Lesnoy Urban Okrug
  - Capital of: Lesnoy Urban Okrug
- Time zone: UTC+5 (MSK+2)
- Postal code: 624200
- Dialing code: +7 34342
- OKTMO ID: 65749000001

Lesnoy (Russian: Лесно́й) is a closed town in Sverdlovsk Oblast, Russia, located 254 kilometers (158 mi) north of Yekaterinburg on the banks of the Tura River. Population: 50,363 (2010 census); 53,195 (2002 census).

== History ==
It was founded in 1947 when Plant 418 was constructed to produce highly enriched uranium (HEU) for the production of nuclear weapons. Nuclear weapons were also assembled there. In 1954, it became the closed town of Sverdlovsk-45 to support production of nuclear weapons.

Sverdlovsk-45 remained secret until President Boris Yeltsin decreed in 1992 that such places could use their historical names; the town had not appeared on official maps until then.

== Administrative and municipal status ==
Within the framework of the administrative divisions, it is, together with one work settlement and three rural localities, incorporated as the closed administrative-territorial formation of Lesnoy—an administrative unit with the status equal to that of the districts. As a municipal division, the closed administrative-territorial formation of Lesnoy is incorporated as Lesnoy Urban Okrug.
