= Minoru Betsuyaku =

Japanese playwright (1937–2020)

Minoru Betsuyaku (別役 実, Betsuyaku Minoru; 1937 – March 3, 2020) was one of Japan's most prominent postwar playwrights, novelists, and essayists, associated with the Angura ("underground") theater movement in Japan. He won a name for himself as a writer in the "nonsense" genre and helped lay the foundations of the Japanese "theater of the absurd." His works focused on the aftermath of the war and especially the nuclear holocaust.

== Early life ==
Minoru Betsuyaku was born in the Japanese colony of Manchuria in 1937. Betsuyaku's early years were difficult because in addition to experiencing severe deprivation during World War II, his father also died. In July 1946, a year after the sudden Soviet invasion of Manchuria, his mother succeeded in repatriating by ship with her children. The family spent two years in Kōchi, his father's hometown, before moving to Shimizu, Shizuoka, where his mother's family lived. Betsuyaku's family then moved to Nagano, where he finished high school. At this time Betsuyaku hoped to become a painter, but due to his family's strong disapproval, he instead moved to Tokyo in 1958 and enrolled in Waseda University with the intention of becoming a newspaper correspondent. On his first day of classes, an upperclassman suggested that he look into becoming an actor since he was tall. Thus, he joined a drama club called the Jiyu Butai, where he met Tadashi Suzuki, the director who would start the Waseda Little Theater Company with Betsuyaku.

== Early career and influences ==
In 1960, Betsuyaku and Suzuki became involved in the Anpo protests against the US–Japan Security Treaty. The pair began producing a political theatre of protest, which eventually evolved into the Waseda Little Theatre Company. This led Betsuyaku to neglect both his studies and his finances, causing him to drop out of Waseda in 1961 due to non-payment of tuition. Around this time, Betsuyaku took a leave of absence from the theatre to become involved in protests against the establishment of a military base on the island of Niijima. When he returned from his hiatus later that year, Betsuyaku wrote his first play, A and B and a Certain Woman. The play was about a man, man B, who felt inferior to man A. Man B is continuously derided by man A until man B finally kills man A. The play was inspired in part by the 1957 film An Eye for an Eye, which had a similar plot with an irresolvable conflict.

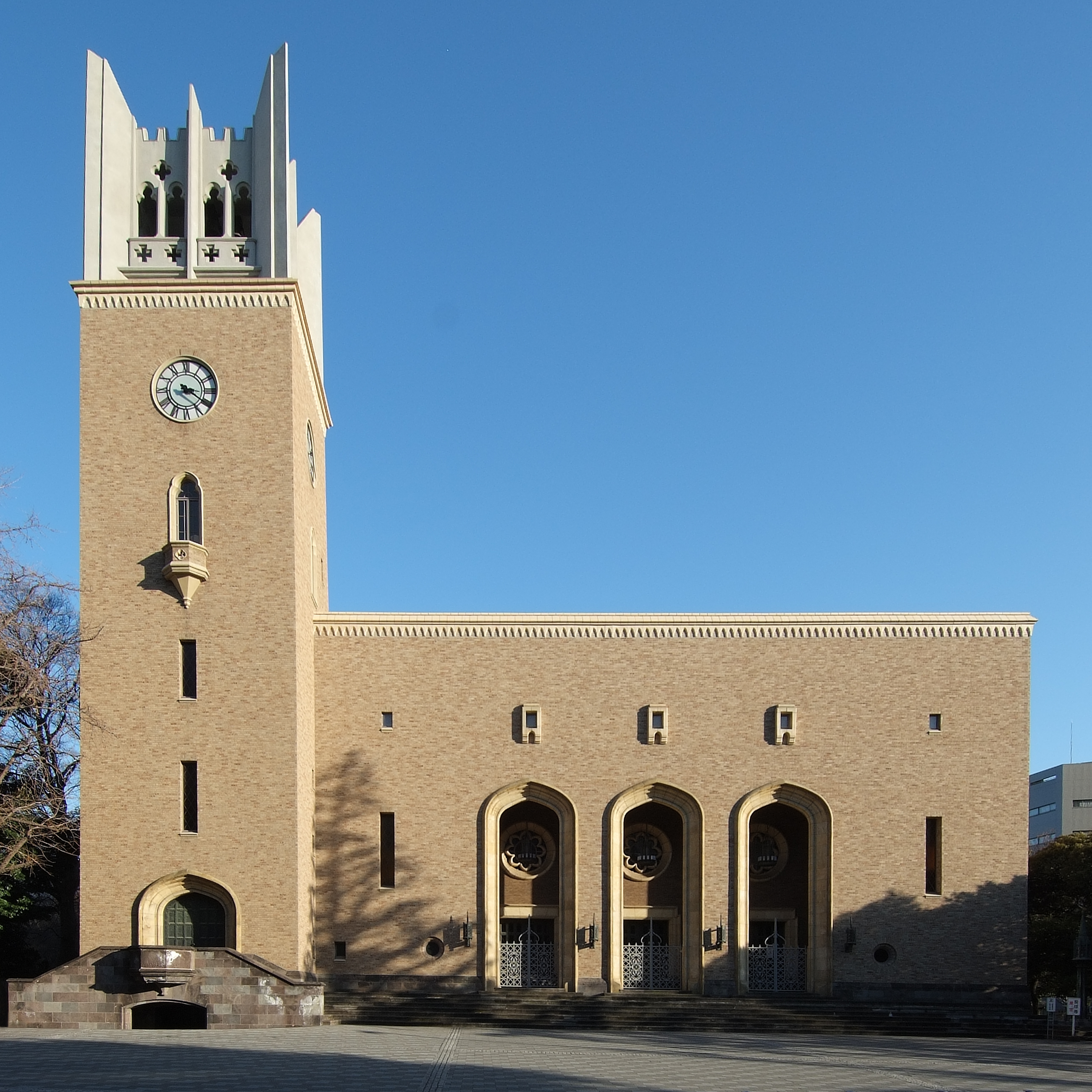
Waseda University

Another early influence was Samuel Beckett, whose works came to be known in Japan around the time that young playwrights in Japan were seeking to break away from realist plays, and especially socialist realism, which sought to further the cause of socialist revolution. Realist plays featured an impenetrable fourth wall that was only visible to the actors, and typically made use of extensive props and detailed backdrops to make the play more realistic. However, Betsuyaku's work was like Beckett's work in the sense that it had no walls and it had very few props or background objects. For example, some of his plays had only a telephone pole, like the lone tree in Beckett's Waiting for Godot. Betsuyaku called this "Beckett space". Realist plays feature complex characters with names to make the play more realistic. However, Betsuyaku's and Beckett's plays had simple characters with no names. This style of play was unique and open to interpretation. For example, the characters were identified as man A and man B instead of Paul or John.

== Style of work ==
Betsuyaku's career took off when he joined the Waseda Little Theater Company. He created many works with the principle of theater of the absurd; however, his style of play changed multiple times along the way. For example, he moved into the concept of isolation in the post-war period. His motivation was the "animosity and agony" aroused by the condition of the times. Betsuyaku believed that "the moment we understood that it is a solitude resulting from animosity and agony, that solitude could become a weapon". However, this theme disappeared in his writing by the 1980s.

Betsuyaku was also influenced by Anton Chekhov during his career. He focused mainly on "Japanizing" Chekhov's work. For example, Betsuyaku wrote his play Three Sisters in a Thousand Years based on Chekhov's Three Sisters. The plot and characters were unchanged but the setting was changed to Japan. Betsuyaku is trying to say that meaning of life is completely lost and that the search for identity is empty. This is a reference to the people of Japan after the loss in World War II.

== Personal life ==
He left Waseda Little Theatre in 1968, and in 1970 he married actress Yuko Kusunoki, an indispensable partner in many productions of Betsuyaku's work, especially in her small theatre group, the Snail Theatre Group Katatsumuri no Kai (1978–1799). In 1971 a daughter was born.

== Awards ==
- 1968 – 13th "New Theatre" Kishida Kunio Drama Award ("The Little Match Girl" and "A Scene With A Red Bird")
- 1971 – Kinokuniya Theater Award ("A Town and a Blimp" and "Alice in Wonderland")
- 1972 – "New Artist" Award of the Ministry of Education's Selected Artists Encouragement Awards ("The Revolt of the Breeze Tribe")
- 1987 – Yomiuri Literature Award ("The Story of the Two Knights Traveling Around the Country" and other plays)
- 1988 – Minister of Education Award for the Arts ("Giovanni's Journey to His Father")
- 1997 – Cultural Award of Hyogo Prefecture
- 1998 – Special Award of the 39th Mainichi Art Award
- 2007 – Kinokuniya Theater Award ("Godot Has Come" and "If a Dog Turns to the West, Its Tail Faces the East")
- 2008 – 11th Tsuruya Nanboku Play Award and the Asahi Award ("Godot Has Come")

== Famous works ==
- A to B to Hitori no Onna (A and B and a Certain Woman) [1961]

This is a work that shows a fight resulting from unidentified animosity and feelings of inferiority between two men A and B who deride each other and argue.

- Match Uri no Shojo (The Little Match Girl) [1966]

It is about a woman paying a visit to the home of an ordinary middle-class elderly couple. She makes a claim that she was the daughter of the couple. She brings herself a younger brother and her children to the house. It is a work that criticizes the postwar attitude of pretending that the war had never happened.

- Zō (The Elephant) [1962]

The Elephant is one of his most famous plays and was first presented by Jiyu Butai (Free Stage). It is a story about a patient who is a victim of the atomic bombing with a strange desire to show off his scar in order to get sympathy and applause from his audiences. His nephew tries to stop him and convince him that the audience neither loves, hates, nor cares about the atomic bombing victims. Additionally, he tries to convince his uncle that victims should suffer their pain in silence. These contradicting characters depict how victims of war deal with their pain.

- I Am Alice [1970]

Alice lives in a country where a republican government and a monarchy exist simultaneously. Alice is then given double sentences of exile by these two organizations. Alice rediscovers her true identity during exile and tells the world, "I Am Alice": the theme is that a person must rediscover their true self.

- Suji de Kakareta Monogatari – "Shinou Dan" Tenmatsuki (A story told in numbers – the end of the "let's die group") [1974]

Seven men and women have gathered for "Rite of Death by Starvation". They isolated themselves with the intention of dying, but they must starve together as a group.

- Godot Has Come [2007] – Godot Has Come is based on Samuel Beckett's "Waiting for Godot".

The story is about two men, Estragon and Vladimir, who wait for a person named Godot. Godot Has Come features the same characters and plot as Waiting for Godot, with an added twist. There are two women who meet Estragon and Vladimir while waiting for Godot. Before long, Godot does arrive. He looks like a traveler, wearing a trench coat and carrying a suitcase and an umbrella. He lets everybody know that he is Godot and that he has arrived. But by the time Estragon and Vladimir hear the news, they already have their hands full with other things to do. It turns out that the lady waiting for the bus may be Estragon's mother and that the child carried by the other woman may be Vladimir's son. The characters are depicted as being so busy with their real lives that they forget what or who they are waiting for.

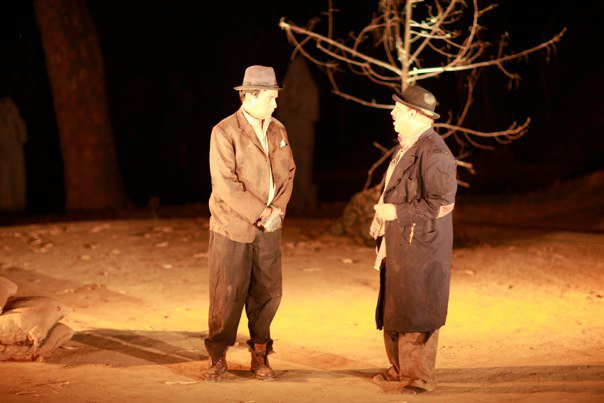
Vladimir and Estragon (June 2010 production of the play at The Doon School, India)
