= Tadashi Suzuki =

Japanese theatre director and acting theorist

- 鈴木 忠志
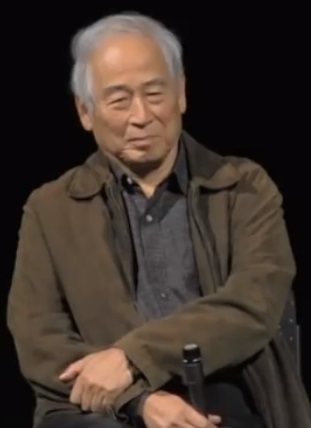
- Tadashi Suzuki in 2017
- Born: Shizuoka, Shizuoka Prefecture, Japan
- Education: Waseda University
- Occupations: Theatre director, playwright
- Writing career
- Genre: Angura

Tadashi Suzuki (鈴木 忠志; born June 20, 1939) is a Japanese avant-garde theatre director, writer, and philosopher.

He is the founder and director of the Suzuki Company of Toga (SCOT), and organizer of Japan’s first international theatre festival (Toga Festival). With American director Anne Bogart, he co-founded the Saratoga International Theatre Institute (SITI) in Saratoga Springs, New York.

He is the creator of the "Suzuki method" of actor training, which emphasizes stylized body work and physicality drawing from dance and elements of traditional Japanese theater.

Suzuki was the general artistic director of Shizuoka Performing Arts Center (SPAC) (1995–2007), an international committee member of the Theatre Olympics; a founding member of the BeSeTo Festival (演劇祭), jointly organized by leading theatre artists from Japan, China and Korea; and, chairman of the Board of Directors for the Japan Performing Arts Foundation, a nationwide network of theatre professionals in Japan.

== Career ==
Suzuki became involved in the Angura ("underground") theater movement in Japan in the early 1960s and founded a theater troupe called the Waseda Little Theatre, which focused on the physical talents of star actress Kayoko Shiraishi. It was with the Waseda Little Theatre that Suzuki began to develop his Suzuki Method of actor training.

He relocated his company from Tokyo to the remote mountain village of Toga in 1976. The Toga Art Park now comprises six theaters, rehearsal facilities, offices, lodgings, and restaurants. It continues to host a summer and winter season of performances, symposiums, workshops and competitions. There, his company was renamed the Suzuki Company of Toga (SCOT).

Suzuki's works include On the Dramatic Passions, The Trojan Women, Dionysus, Vision of Lear, Cyrano de Bergerac, and Madame de Sade, among others.

His work has been seen internationally, beginning in 1972 at the Théâtre des Nations Festival in France. In the United States, The Bacchae was shown in 1982 at La MaMa Experimental Theatre Club, and The Trojan Women at the 1984 Los Angeles Olympics Arts Festival. The Trojan Women was performed in 2017 as part of a symposium on the Suzuki Method with SITI Company at Skidmore College, SCOT's first performance in the US since 2001.

Besides productions with his own company, he has directed several international collaborations. In 1988, four American regional theaters, Arena Stage, Berkeley Repertory Theatre, Milwaukee Repertory Theater, and Stage West, many of whose actors had studied with Suzuki, co-produced an all-male version of Suzuki's The Tale of Lear, his only production with an all-American cast; King Lear, presented with the Moscow Art Theatre; Oedipus Rex, co-produced by Cultural Olympiad and the Düsseldorf Schauspielhaus; and Electra, produced by Ansan Arts Center / Arco Arts Theatre in Korea and the Taganka Theatre in Russia.

=== Saratoga International Theater Institute ===
In 1992, Suzuki founded the Saratoga International Theater Institute with Anne Bogart, to create theatre, train actors and develop a "new approach to world theatre." For the Institute's first season in Saratoga Springs, New York, he directed SCOT and American actors together in Dionysus. While his direct involvement in SITI was planned to, and did, only last a few years, the Institute continued until 2022, evolving into a New York based theatre company with year round programs and a resident acting company, with an annual summer institute at Skidmore College.

== The Suzuki Method of Actor Training ==
The Suzuki Method of actor training emphasizes developing the ability control one's breathing to allow actors to speak powerfully with clear articulation and at the same time allow the whole body to ”speak”, even in silence. It centers on a physically grueling training regimen of approximately two hours, featuring much stomping on the ground said to be derived from ancient Japanese rituals. Trainees are required to assume a squatting posture for lengthy periods in order to "enhance their affinity with the ground."

== Teaching and writing ==
Suzuki has articulated his theories in a number of books. Two collections of his writing have been published in English.

He has taught his system of actor training in schools and theatres, including The Juilliard School in New York and the Moscow Art Theatre.

== Bibliography ==
- Fragments of Glass: A Conversation between Hijikata Tatsumi and Suzuki Tadashi
- Interview: The Word Is an Act of the Body by William O. Beeman, Tadashi Suzuki and Kosho Kadogami
- The Way of Acting: The Theatre Writings of Tadashi Suzuki by Tadashi Suzuki, Theatre Communications Group, (1993), ISBN 978-0-930452-56-8
- Culture is the Body by Tadashi Suzuki, Theatre Communications Group, (2015), ISBN 978-1-55936-496-6
