= Kaito Nakahori =

Japanese composer

Katsunari Nakahori
- Born: September 14, 1989; Chiba, Japan
- Education: San Francisco Conservatory of Music
- Occupations: Composer, Artistic Director

Katsunari Nakahori (Japanese: 中堀 克成, born September 14, 1989) known by his stage name Kaito Nakahori (Japanese: 中堀 海都 Nakahori Kaito), is a Chinese Japanese composer of contemporary classical music based in New York City, United States.

== Career ==
=== Early life and education ===
Nakahori was born in Chiba, Japan, in 1989. After Tōru Takemitsu's Gagaku Shuteiga (In An Autumn Garden) inspired him at the age of 14, he began studying composition independently. He later pursued formal studies in composition in Japan and the United States, and received a Bachelor of Music degree from Toho College of Music (2012) and a Master of Music degree from San Francisco Conservatory of Music (2014). In 2013, the Japan Cultural Institute in Rome invited him to speak about Japanese contemporary music at a symposium, during which his piano solo piece Hidden Instincts was performed by Aki Takahashi.

=== Early work ===
After graduating, Nakahori moved to New York City. In 2015, he held a portrait concert at the United Nations headquarters, where he conducted his own work Summit of Mt. Fuji. He was described by the Shenzhen newspaper Chin po as a “Half Chinese, half Japanese, gifted composer”.

He has explored the fusion of traditional Japanese and Western instruments in several works. In 2014, his Japanese Footbridge for koto and chamber ensemble was performed, described by Harry Rolnick as having "the misty feeling of Japanese gagaku music, court music so regal, that it seems static, only the colors changing. Mr. Nakahori blended his instruments with such impeccable taste, that the entire blend could have had a lulling, a mesmeric feeling on the listener." In 2017, Hotarubi for hichiriki and string quartet, commissioned by the Goethe-Institut, premiered at the Tongyeong International Music Festival.

At the recommendation of Toshio Hosokawa, Nakahori conducted his chamber work Two Different Paintings at the 150th anniversary concert of Japan–Hungary diplomatic relations in 2019, commissioned by Tokyo Bunka Kaikan.

=== Theater Opera and contemporary total artwork ===
In 2020, his first opera, Zero, with a libretto by Oriza Hirata, premiered at the Toyooka Theater Festival. The opera was inspired by Haruki Murakami's Norwegian Wood, and arias for the work had been composed since 2015. Between 2015 and 2016, he served as composer-in-residence with the Khemia Ensemble, touring South America. One of the arias, Zero I, was performed in Argentina and Colombia, and the work received the Brian M. Israel Prize.

In 2021, his stage work Countless Wells for soprano, cello, and electronics (32 speakers + IRCAM Spat), commissioned by the Fondation Royaumont in co-production with IRCAM, premiered at the Festival de Royaumont in France. He has since continued to develop compositions incorporating immersive, multichannel sound in his staged works.

In 2025, Nakahori's Theatre Opera The Star Has No Sound – Clockwork Universe collaborated with Oriza Hirata, was produced in co-produced by the Toyooka Theater Festival, the Setouchi Triennale, and the Mito International Music Festival. The work integrates contemporary theater, visual art, music, and spatial sound (produced in collaboration with Yamaha Corporation), exploring a new form of Theatre Opera proposed by Nakahori and Hirata, and creating a new form of total art that connects different festivals and regions.

In the same year, he founded the Mito International Music Festival and assumed the role of artistic director, with a focus on integrating music and cultural tourism.

== Musical style ==
- His compositions explore the integration of nature and the inner world.
- Influenced by both Western contemporary classical music and Japanese traditional music, particularly Gagaku, he developed an approach that emphasizes subtle timbral shifts, a sense of suspended temporality, and a detailed exploration of micro-acoustic textures—an aesthetic he describes as “Timeless Music.”

== Awards ==
- Impronta Ensemble Composition Competition – 1st prize (2019)
- Brian M. Israel Prize (Society for New Music/NY Federation of Music Clubs Award) (2016)

== Major works ==
=== Stage works ===
- Theater Opera The Star Has No Sound – Clockwork Universe (2025, co-production with the Toyooka Theater Festival, the Setouchi Triennale, and the Mito International Music Festival, text by Oriza Hirata)
- Countless Wells for soprano, cello, and electronics (32 speakers + IRCAM Spat), (2021, commissioned by the Fondation Royaumont in co-production with IRCAM
- Theater Opera Zero (2020, commissioned by the Toyooka Theater Festival, text by Oriza Hirata

=== Orchestra works ===
- Self Portrait for orchestra (2017)
- Leading to the Paradise for orchestra (2010)

=== Chamber works ===
- Abyss for string quartet (2022, dedicated to the Arditti Quartet, commissioned by the Takefu International Music Festival)
- Shroud of the Rain (2022, commissioned by the Mandolin Orchestra Guild)
- Two Different Pictures (2018, commissioned by Tokyo Bunka Kaikan, commemorating the 150th anniversary of Japan–Hungary diplomatic relations)
- Sand Ripples (2018, commissioned by Kyoto Art Center and Rosetta Ensemble)
- Hotarubi for hichiriki and string quartet (2017, commissioned by the Goethe-Institut, premiered at the Tongyeong International Music Festival)
- Zen in Kyudo – Concentration (2015, Boston Early Music Festival)
- Zero I (2015, Khemia Ensemble South America tour; awarded the 2016 Brian M. Israel Prize)
- Japanese Footbridge for koto and chamber ensemble (2014, Markin Hall, New York and Jordan Hall, Boston)
- Setsurei (2014, dedicated to Mayumi Endo, Hagoromo Hotel, and Mayumi Miyata, shō player)
- Yaeyama Hirugi for clarinet and string quartet (2014, first prize, Impronta Ensemble Composition Competition)
- Hyle α – Melancholy for vibraphone and piano (2014, commissioned by Shinichi Ueno, Sala Radio Hall, Romania)
- Summit of Mt. Fuji (2014) for chamber ensemble

=== Gagaku works ===
- Starlight and Frost (Seisō) (2023–2025, commissioned by Naoyuki MANABE GAGAKU Ensemble, Tokyo Opera City)

=== Solo works ===
- Fragments (2022, commissioned by Takaaki Shibata, mandolin)
- Contemplation (2021, commissioned by Francesco D'Orazio, violin, Nuova Consonanza Festival)
- Meigetsu (2017) for shakuhachi
- Hidden instincts (2012) for piano (2022, dedicated to Aki Takahashi)

=== Film music ===
- After Spring, the Tamaki Family... (2016) Director: Huang Yin-Yu (2016) Taipei Film Awards, Nomination.
