= Toshiki Okada =

Japanese writer and theater director

- 岡田 利規
- Born: July 3, 1973 (age 53); Yokohama, Kanagawa, Japan
- Occupations: Playwright, director, novelist
- Writing career
- Years active: 1997–present
- Notable works: Enjoy, Five Days in March
- Notable awards: Yokohama Cultural Award (2005); Kishida Prize for Drama (2005); Ōe Kenzaburō Prize (2008)

Toshiki Okada (岡田 利規, Okada Toshiki; born July 3, 1973) is a Japanese playwright, theater director, novelist, and founder of the theatrical company chelfitsch. He is known for "his use of hyper-colloquial Japanese and his unique choreography."

== Life and career ==
=== Personal life ===
Born in Yokohama in 1973, Okada attended Nagatadai Elementary and Nagata Secondary School there. In 1992, he started attending Keio University under the Faculty of Business and Commerce. Being a fan of Jim Jarmusch and Wim Wenders, Okada aspired to be a movie director when he was in middle school, which led him to join a theater club in Keio University. During this process, he gained experience in writing scenarios and scripts, which piqued his interest in stage directing as well. In his first year at Keio, he learned of Hideki Noda through Noda's troupe, The Dream Wanderers (夢の遊眠社, Yume no Yūmin-sha), who had their final performance in 1992. Noda's modern and "unexpected" style influenced Okada's earlier works.

=== Career ===
In 1997, Okada formed the theatrical company chelfitsch in collaboration with dancer, Natsuko Tezuka. The name chelfitsch (チェルフィッチュ) is a play on the English word "selfish," and is always written with a lowercase c. After the 2011 Tōhoku earthquake and tsunami, chelfitsch relocated from Yokohama to Kumamoto to avoid the threats of the earthquake and nuclear contamination. Okada has written all the scripts and directed all of the company's productions.

Okada first started writing in a hyperrealistic style with Behold Their Hopes! (彼等の希望に瞠れ, Karera no kibō ni mihare) in 2001, and he started choreographing his plays with Five Days in March (三月の5日間, Sangatsu no itsukakan) in 2005. He received his first award, Yokohama Cultural Award / Yokohama Award for Art and Cultural Encouragement in 2005. In the same year, Five Days in March, a play that juxtaposes a couple spending five days in a love hotel against the beginning of the Iraq War, won the 49th Kishida Prize for Drama. Air Conditioner (クーラー, Kūrā) was a finalist at the 2005 Toyota Choreography Awards. In 2006, Okada participated as the representative for Japan in the Stuecke '06/International Literature Project in Mülheim, Germany during the 2006 FIFA World Cup. In December 2006, Enjoy (エンジョイ, Enjoi) was presented at the New National Theatre Tokyo. In contrast to his international acclaim, Enjoy was not well received by Japanese theater critics, who voted the play as the year's worst play. Between 2006 and 2007, he was appointed the director of the Performing Arts Festival "Summit" at the Komaba Agora Theater, where one of his role models, Oriza Hirata served as the artistic director. His book, The End of the Special Time We Were Allowed (わたしたちに許された特別な時間の終わり, Watashitachi ni yurusareta tokubetsu na jikan no owari), was published in February 2007 and consisted of two novels. One is a reworking of his play Five Days in March; the other, an earlier piece, is called Our Many Places (わたしの場所の複数, Watashitachi no basho no fukusū). The book received the 2008 Ōe Kenzaburō Prize. In 2015, Okada was nominated for the 28th Mishima Yukio Prize for his novel adaptation of his play, Current Location (現在地, Genzaichi), which was first staged at the Kanagawa Arts Theatre on April 20, 2012.

Besides directing his own plays, he has also directed Samuel Beckett's Cascando for the Tokyo International Arts Festival and Beckett Centennial Memorial Festival, and Kōbō Abe's Friends at the Setagaya Public Theater. Since 2012, he has been a judge for Kishida Prize for Drama. He also leads workshop programs with theater students in Japanese universities during his free time.

== Style ==
Okada's works represent the "lost generation," the generation that is most affected by the Japanese recession in the 1990s. Faced with economic and political challenges that were set by the bubble burst, young Japanese people are forced to have part-time work for which they are overqualified. One of his plays, Enjoy (エンジョイ, Enjoi; 2006), explores this issue of unemployment and temporary employment. The story follows the stories of struggling freeters in their 20s and 30s who work in a manga café. Okada’s works deal with everyday life, pertaining to work, love, and personal life. Rather than directly addressing recent social issues in Japan like Ai Nagai and Yōji Sakate, Okada focuses on connecting to his audience's sense of alienation by separating speech and movement in his plays. Okada's hyperrealistic style is often referred to as "super real Japanese," which draws influence from Oriza Hirata's "quiet theater" movement from the 1980s.

His works are distinguished by the use of fragmented and abbreviated idiosyncratic language in the vernacular of Japanese in their twenties, which is deliberately inarticulate, drawn out, and circular. Exaggerating the natural rhythms in human speech, his works comically integrate "natural" Japanese speech that is filled with passive verb forms and chains of dependent clauses, with no periods. A typical example is from the opening of Enjoy, translated by Aya Ogawa:

ACTOR 1: We'll begin with Act One... This guy named Kato was riding the subway the other day, he was riding the Keio line and, he had an encounter then, when he sat next to... There were these two women who were talking, but... Kato had no intention of eavesdropping at all, of course but, while he was listening, to be honest, he... in the end, from the middle of the conversation, it did turn completely into eavesdropping but... you know how for text messaging they have those screen stickers that you put on your phone to keep your screen hidden from the person standing next to you, well there aren't such things for voices, so in a way, it's a little like too bad, you know, which may be like totally an excuse but.... but with that conversation, it was a little like no matter how you look at it, their voices were, clearly above and beyond what is a standard volume, I mean come on, was the way it seemed and that was because... on top of that the content of the conversation itself also like, would have piqued anyone's interest in this...

Accompanying the broken phrases is the physical body language of the performers, made up of disjointed and abstract movements that combine isolated pedestrian gestures. The choreography he uses in his play is very different from highly coordinated dancing, as it focuses on "junk body" or "child’s body" choreography that rejects adult sexuality and Western dance techniques.

Okada was inspired by Hirata's quote, "It is strange for the actors to tap into their self-consciousness when speaking their lines." Okada believes that his actors should be able to manipulate their consciousness and balance their attention on both their words and movement. The gap between language and the body is the lived experiences each performer gathers from their environment to bring to their performances, and they use the external body to reflect those lived experiences or "images." Okada advises his actors to not be overly attached with the language or the physicality of the performance so that the audience can interpret the "image," themselves. Actors are one single entity to the image; in addition, Okada uses "the performance's disjointed elements of language, movement, design, music, and more" to signify the "image" in his plays.

His works are heavily influenced by Bertolt Brecht's Verfremdungseffekt technique that detaches the audience from the action in the play. Okada refers to the theater as a place for performers to interact with the audience. Therefore, his performers usually use indirect, third-person speech in their monologues and narrate directly to the audience in his plays, which breaks the fourth wall. His characters are often labelled only "Actor One," with the same "character" played by more than one performer.

Okada constantly implements contemporary issues and speech styles into his text. Following the Tōhoku earthquake in 2011, he wrote Current Location, a play that reintroduces the concept of "haisha no tachiba" which literally translates to "from the standpoint of the afflicted people." He confronts the reality that post-earthquake victims in Fukushima faced by juxtaposing distinct voices using the particle, wa, which allows the victims to speak harmoniously while in discord.

== International production and reception ==
Okada's first overseas activity was his re-staging of Five Days in March at the Kunsten Festival des Arts in Brussels, Belgium in 2007. Since then, he has been invited to other festivals such as the Vienna Art Week in Vienna and Festival d'Automne à Paris in Paris. Those collaborations led to the creation of Freetime (フリータイム, Furītaimu) in March 2008. In October 2009, Hot Pepper, Air Conditioner, and the Farewell Speech (ホットペッパー、クーラー、そしてお別れの挨拶, Hottopeppā, kūrā, soshite, owakare no aisatsu), which was co-produced by Hebbel am Ufer, premiered in Berlin. In 2013, Okada collaborated with Hebbel am Ufer again to produce Ground and Floor, which had its premiere in Kunsten Festival des Arts in Brussels along with an eight-country European tour. In 2014, Okada was invited to present Super Premium Soft Double Vanilla Rich (スーパープレミアムソフトWバニラリッチ, Sūpā puremiamu sofuto W banira ricchi) at the Theater der Welt festival in Mannheim, Germany. The play explores Japan's consumerism culture by introducing characters who have different perspectives pertaining to konbini or Japanese convenient stores, whose numbers have increased since the 1970s. His newest work, God Bless Baseball is set to premiere in Gwangju, Korea for the Asian Arts Theatre Festival in September 2015. chelfitsch has also toured Seoul, Cardiff, Salzburg, Singapore, Seattle, Vancouver, and other cities.

=== America ===
Okada made his American debut in 2009 with a seven-city tour of Five Days in March. The premiere of the play was presented with supertitles by chelfitsch Theater Company at Japan Society in February 2009. The following year in April–May 2010, New York-based company, the Play Company, produced Enjoy at the 59E59 Theaters with Dan Rothenberg from Pig Iron Theatre Company as the director and Aya Ogawa as the translator. The Play Company has also produced works of other renowned Japanese playwright-directors such as Yōji Sakate in the past. In May 2010, Daniel Safer adapted Five Days in March in English based on Ogawa's translations at La MaMa. Since then, Okada's works has been produced numerous times in New York, where he has received generally favorable reviews from various media outlets such as New York Times, nytheater now, Time Out, and The Village Voice. Jason Zinoman from New York Times claimed that, "[Okada's] melancholy style suits the current recession-era America." In 2012, Hot Pepper, Air Conditioner, and the Farewell Speech (ホットペッパー、クーラー、そしてお別れの挨拶, Hottopeppā, kūrā, soshite, owakare no aisatsu) was presented by the Japan Society as part of the 2012 Under the Radar Festival. Also in that year, Okada had his first English-language world premiere with Zero Cost House, which was a collaboration with Pig Iron Theatre Company, as a part of the Philadelphia Live Arts Festival. Set in the aftermath of the Tōhoku earthquake, the play is partly an autobiography of Okada's life, and is also influenced by Henry David Thoreau's Walden and Kyōhei Sakaguchi's nonfiction essay, To Start an Urban Hunter-Gatherer Life from Zero (ゼロから始める都市型狩猟採集生活, Zerokara hajimeru toshigata shuryō saishū seikatsu). On March 11, 2012, in collaboration with other playwrights and theaters from Japan and New York, one act from Okada'sThe Sonic Life of a Giant Tortoise (ゾウガメのソニックライフ, Zōgame no sonikku raifu) was showcased at the Segal Theater for the event "Shinsai: Theaters for Japan." The purpose of the event was to raise funds for members of Japan’s theater community who were affected by the 2011 Tōhoku earthquake. In 2014, Okada returned to New York with The Sonic Life of a Giant Tortoise, which was staged by the Play Company and performed at the JACK Theater.

== Awards and nominations ==
=== Awards ===
- 2005: Yokohama Cultural Award/Yokohama Award for Art and Cultural Encouragement
- 2005: 49th Kishida Prize for Drama for Five Days in March
- 2007: 56th Kanagawa Culture and Sports Award
- 2008: 2nd Ōe Kenzaburō Prize for The End of the Special Time We Were Allowed

=== Nominations ===
- 2005: 2005 Toyota Choreography Awards for Air Conditioner
- 2015: 28th Mishima Yukio Prize for Current Location

== Works ==
=== Stage works ===
- 1997: Canyon (峡谷, Kyōkoku)
- 1998: The Hat and the Satellite (帽子と人工衛星, Bōshi to jinkōeisei)
- 1999: 2 Soldiers and the TACHIMACHINEGI (二人の兵士とタチマチネギ, Futari no heishi to tachimachinegi)
- 2000: 3 Days, 3 Nights, and 100 Years (三日三晩、そして百年, Mikkamiban, soshite hyakunen)
- 2001: Behold Their Hopes! (彼等の希望に瞠れ, Karera no kibō ni mihare)
- 2001: A Trip to Mind of Apartment Complex (団地の心への旅, Danchi no kokoro he no tabi)
- 2002: Apartment (マンション, Manshon)
- 2003: Love and Myself (恋と自分／とんかつ屋, Koi to jibun / Tonkatsu-ya)
- 2003: On the Harmful Effects of Marijuana (マリファナの害について, Marifana no gai ni tsuite)
- 2004: Five Days in March (三月の5日間, Sangatsu no itsukakan)
- 2004: Air Conditioner (クーラー, Kūrā)
- 2004: The End of Toil (労苦の終わり, Rouku no owari)
- 2005: Destination (目的地, Mokutekichi)
- 2006: The Time That Is Not Related to the Body (体と関係のない時間, Karada to kankei no nai jikan)
- 2006: Enjoy (エンジョイ, Enjoi)
- 2008: Freetime (フリータイム, Furītaimu)
- 2009: Hot Pepper, Air Conditioner, and the Farewell Speech (ホットペッパー、クーラー、そしてお別れの挨拶, Hottopeppā, kūrā, soshite, owakare no aisatsu)
- 2009: We Are Someone Else Being Not Injured (わたしたちは無傷な別人である, Watashitachi wa mukizu na betsujin de aru)
- 2011: The Sonic Life of a Giant Tortoise (ゾウガメのソニックライフ, Zōgame no sonikku raifu)
- 2012: Zero Cost House
- 2012: Current Location (現在地, Genzaichi)
- 2013: Ground and Floor (地面と床, Jimen to yuka)
- 2014: Super Premium Soft Double Vanilla Rich (スーパープレミアムソフトWバニラリッチ, Sūpā puremiamu sofuto W banira ricchi)
- 2015: God Bless Baseball

=== Adaptations ===
- 2008: Friends (友達, Tomodachi), Original: Kōbō Abe
- 2009: Tätowierung, Original: Dea Loher

=== Novels ===
- 2007: The End of the Moment We Had (わたしたちに許された特別な時間の終わり, Watashitachi ni yurusareta tokubetsu na jikan no owari)
- 2008: The Case of the More Optimistic One (楽観的な方のケース, Rakkanteki na hou no kēsu)
