= Ai Nagai =

Ai Nagai 永井愛
- Born: 16 October 1951 (age 74); Tokyo, Japan
- Education: Tōhō Gakuen College
- Occupations: Stage director, playwright, company founder, company leader
- Writing career
- Years active: 1981–present
- Notable awards: Tsuruya Nanboku Drama Award (1997); Kishida Drama Award (1999); Yomiuri Literature Prize (2000); Asahi Drama Awards Grand Prix (2005)

Ai Nagai (永井愛, Nagai Ai; born on 16 October 1951) is a Japanese playwright, stage director, and the co-founder and leader of the theater company Nitosha. She is known for adopting realism as her primary writing style. Two of her major works, The Three Hagi Sisters (萩家の三姉妹, Hagi-ke no san shimai) and Time's Storeroom (時の物置, Toki no mono oki), both exemplify her utilization of realism.

According to The Japan Foundation's Performing Arts Network, Nagai is currently regarded as one of the most sought-after playwrights in Japan because of her "well-made plays," in which social issues are treated from a critical perspective.

== Life and work ==
=== Early life ===
Ai Nagai was born on October 16, 1951, in Tokyo, as the daughter of a painter and a member of the Communist Party, Kiyoshi Nagai. Since her parents divorced when she was still young, she was raised by her father and her paternal grandmother, Shizu Nagai. Her father's connections with the theater world when she was young influenced her to take on a path to a theatrical career. In Time's Storeroom (時の物置, Toki no mono oki), the character Grandmother Nobu is modeled on Nagai's own grandmother. Also, in Look, How High the Plane Flies! (見よ、飛行機の高く飛べるを, Miyo, hikōki no takaku toberu wo), Nagai writes about her grandmother's experiences at a teachers college.

After graduating high school, she became a member of the Friends of the Haiyu-za theater company, which enabled her to watch all the company's productions. In 1970, Nagai studied at the theater department of Tōhō Gakuen College for four years, including two years in the postgraduate drama program. The theater department used to be an acting school that was affiliated with the Haiyu-za, where many professional actors had been trained. She chose this college because she became a fan of the actress Etsuko Ichihara and aspired to become a member of the Haiyu-za company. As the popularity of the "Angura" (underground) theater movement grew, she attended performances at small underground theaters. Examples include Jūrō Kara's Jōkyō Gekijo, Makoto Satō's Kuro Tento and Ren Saitō's Jiyū Gekijō. Seeing these types of performances made her lose her aspirations of joining a theater company of the Shingeki genre.

After graduating in 1974, Nagai was invited to join the theater company, Spring and Autumn Group (Shunjūdan), where she met Shizuka Ōishi. Since the company disbanded after two years, Nagai and Ōishi decided to write and produce their own plays.

=== Nitosha Theatre Company ===
In 1981, Nitosha (The Two Rabbits) Company was established as a theater company. Nagai and Ōishi named their theater company "Nitosha" because they were both born in the Year of the Rabbit. They also acted in original Nitosha productions as they alternate as playwrights. Their quick-changing two women shows such as Kazuo (かずお, Kazuo) helped them gain popularity. In 1991, Ōishi left the company to have a career in TV scenario writing. This left Nagai to direct her own plays herself for Nitosha's productions. This company is still active and it is located in Nerima, Tokyo. Nitosha has consistently provided plays that do not only entertain the audience but also make them feel actually involved and committed to the issues presented on stage.

== Theatrical career ==
Nitosha continues to put works on stage as Nagai writes and directs them. Other organizations like the New National Theatre, Tokyo benefits from her works because she writes for them too. Nagai also used to be the president of the Japan Playwrights Association.

Nagai is active in other countries such as the United Kingdom, the United States, and South Korea. Her plays are also presented as staged readings. For example, on February 22, 2010, Japan Society in New York read the English translation of Women in a Holy Mess (片付けたい女たち, Katadzuketai on'na-tachi) in an English translation developed in late 2007.

=== Time's Storeroom ===
Nagai's The Trilogy of Post-war Life (戦後生活史劇三部作, Sengo seikatsu shigeki sanbusaku) portrayed tough times faced by ordinary Japanese people as they evolve as a response to the turning points of Japanese history. Examples include the immediate aftermath of Japan's defeat in World War II, the high-growth period of Japanese economy, and the final period of campus riots in 1970 against the renewal of the Japan-U.S. Security Treaty

The trilogy consists of these three plays: Time's Storeroom (時の物置, Toki no mono oki), in which she depicts the first half of the 1960s; Daddy's Democracy (パパのデモクラシー, Papa no demokurashī), in which she depicts the period immediately after World War II; and My Tokyo Diary (僕の東京日記, Boku no Tokyō Nikki), in which she depicts life in the early 1970s. The characters in these works are not interrelated, but Nagai's approach is consistent because the postwar social issues and the plays' significance are portrayed by a particular family or by the events in an apartment building, their living conditions, and what they lost as Japan prioritizes the economic growth in the postwar period.

Nagai also connects Time's Storeroom (時の物置, Toki no mono oki) to another social change, the abolition of legal prostitution in 1958. The play illustrates ordinary people at the verge of the changes in life style and people's consciousness because of the rapid economic growth. She also illustrates the anti-Ampo movement that emerged among students at the 1970 renewal of the treaty ten years later.

=== The Three Hagi Sisters ===
Adapted from Anton Chekhov's Three Sisters, Nagai wrote The Three Hagi Sisters (萩家の三姉妹, Hagi-ke no san shimai) in 2000. The three main characters in Chekhov's play are reflected in Nagai's adaptation. Nagai transforms Chekhov's drama into a comedy. This adaptation confronts current feminist issues and brings to light the disparity between traditional expectations of men and of women. She also depicts the liberation from the socially constructed gender roles in a society that is deeply influenced by a division of labor, attitudes, and behavior by gender. Nagai's adaptation does not commend the old androcentric idea and the patriarchal perspective of families. Instead, it regards feminism with humor. While Japanese modern family dramas around the 1970s portray family breakdowns, Nagai's adaptation comically depicts the breakdown of the internal world of the sisters.

The play Time's Storeroom (時の物置, Toki no mono oki) has 14 scenes and is first staged in 1994 by the Nitosha Theatre Company. This play is also available in the English, Chinese, and Russian languages.

=== Men Who Try to Make Them Sing ===
One of Nagai's most popular plays, Men Who Want to Make Them Sing (歌わせたい男たち, Utawasetai otoko-tachi) is a one-act play written in 2005. It is a social comedy depicting the Tokyo Board of Education's decision in 2003, in which teachers are punished if they fail to abide by the ruling to raise the flag and sing the national anthem at graduation ceremonies.

This play is first staged in 2005 by the Nitosha Theatre Company. The casts included Keiko Toda, Ryosuke Otani, Moeko Koyama, Masami Nakagami, and Yoshimasa Kondo. This play is available in the English language from the Nitosha Theatre Company.

=== Women in a Holy Mess ===
Nagai's play Women in a Holy Mess (片付けたい女たち, Katadzuketai on'na-tachi) is "a hilarious portrayal of post-menopausal life" that portrays three women's lives and friendship. The play's English translation was developed by Kyoko Yoshida and Andy Bragen in late 2007 at The Playwrights' Center in Minneapolis, Minnesota. This is one of her plays that was read in front of an audience and featured American actors led by Cynthia Croot, a New York City theater director.

== Style ==
Nagai's works focus on using realism. She depicts familiar places, subconscious problems, and issues about language, gender, family, and community. She presents ordinary Japanese people who have experienced some social changes in a comical way in contemporary Japan. Three of her highly evaluated works, Daddy's Democracy (パパのデモクラシー, Papa no demokurashī), Brother Returns (兄帰る, Ani kaeru), and Men Who Want to Make Them Sing (歌わせたい男たち, Utawasetai otoko-tachi), portray contemporary Japanese lives satirically. She also incorporates some word play into her plays like in The Three Hagi Sisters (萩家の三姉妹, Hagi-ke no san shimai), although not as much as Noda Hideki, another contemporary playwright.

Nagai and another playwright, Hisashi Inoue, have similarities in their approaches because they both aim to write about ordinary people going through extraordinary situations. Both playwrights also write differently compared to other playwrights in their own generation — such as Toshiki Okada and Oriza Hirata. The clear and logical structure of Nagai's plays makes it naturalistic The characters are caught in some predicament and the motor for the play's theatricality is how the characters are liberated from the predicament. Nagai's plays are easily accessible to Western audiences because her works are both traditionally Japanese while also being very universal at the same time. Another playwright, Yōji Sakate, also resembles Nagai because the motivation behind his dramas is his social conscience. Sakate and Nagai both combine elements of Shingeki and Angura.

== Awards ==
=== Awards and nominations ===
- 1997: 1st Tsuruya Nanboku Drama Award for The Murderous Malice of Language (ら抜きの殺意, Ranuki no satsui)
- 1999: 44th Kishida Drama Award for Brother Returns (兄帰る, Ani kaeru)
- 2000: 52nd Yomiuri Literature Prize for Scenario and Drama for The Three Hagi Sisters (萩家の三姉妹, Hagi-ke no san shimai)
- 2001: Akimoto Matsuyo Award of the 1st Asahi Performing Arts Award for The Topography of Higure (日暮れの地形, Higure no chikei) and Hello, Mother (こんにちは、母さん, Konnichiwa, kāsan)
- 2003: Nagai was nominated for the 8th Yomiuri Theatre Award for Best Direction of The Three Hagi Sisters (萩家の三姉妹, Hagi-ke no san shimai)
- 2005: Nagai was nominated for the 13th Yomiuri Theatre Prize for Best Direction of Men Who Want to Make Them Sing (歌わせたい男たち, Utawasetai otoko-tachi)
- 2015: Minister of Education Award for Fine Arts for Ougai's Mystery (鴎外の怪談, Ougai no kaidan)

=== Awards and nominations for Nitosha Productions ===
- 2001: The Topography of Higure (日暮れの地形, Higure no chikei)
  - Nitosha won the 1st Backer's Prize
- 2003: The Three Hagi Sisters (萩家の三姉妹, Hagi-ke no san shimai)
  - Nitosha won the 27th Kinokuniya Theatre Prize for Group Achievement
  - Nitosha was nominated for Best Production of the 8th Yomiuri Theatre Award
- 2005: Men Who Want to Make Them Sing (歌わせたい男たち, Utawasetai otoko-tachi)
  - Keiko Toda starred and won both the Akimoto Matsuyo Award of the 5th Asahi Performing Arts Award and the 13th Yomiuri Theatre Prize for Best Actress
  - Nitosha won both the Grand Prix of the 5th Asahi Performing Arts Award and the 13th Yomiuri Theatre Prize for Best Production
- 2006: Writing Woman (書き込み女, Kakikomi on'na)
  - Shinobu Terajima starred and won both the 6th Asahi Performing Arts Award and the 14th Yomiuri Theatre Award for Best Actress for her performance
- 2015: Ougai's Mystery (鴎外の怪談, Ougai no kaidan)
  - Nitosha won the Hayakawa "Higeki Kigeki" ("Comedy and Tragedy") Award

== Major works ==
=== Plays and adaptations ===
- 1983: I, Too, Am a Camera: A Report on the Kurokami-sensei case (私もカメラ黒髪先生事件報告, Watashi mo kamera kurokami sensei jiken hokoku)
- 1984: Kazuo (かずお, Kazuo)
- 1984: Fan Letter: A Ham Actor's Murder Case (不安れた大根役者殺人事件, Fuan reta daikon yakusha satsujin jiken)
- The Trilogy of Post-war Life (戦後生活史劇三部作, Sengo seikatsu shigeki sanbusaku)
  - 1994: Time's Storeroom (時の物置, Toki no mono oki)
  - 1995: Daddy's Democracy (パパのデモクラシー, Papa no demokurashī)
  - 1996: My Tokyo Diary (僕の東京日記, Boku no Tokyō nikki)
- 1997: The Murderous Malice of Language (ら抜きの殺意, Ranuki no satsui)
- 1999: Brother Returns (兄帰る, Ani kaeru)
- 2000: The Three Hagi Sisters (萩家の三姉妹, Hagi-ke no san shimai)
- 2001: The Topography of Higure (日暮れの地形, Higure no chikei)
- 2001: Hello, Mother (こんにちは、母さん, Konnichiwa, kāsan)
- 2002: New Light and Darkness (新明暗, Shin meian)
- 2004: Look, How High the Plane Flies! (見よ、飛行機の高く飛べるを, Miyo, hikōki no takaku toberu wo)
- 2005: Men Who Want to Make Them Sing (歌わせたい男たち, Utawasetai otoko-tachi)
- 2006: Writing Woman (書き込み女, Kakikomi on'na)
- 2010: Women in a Holy Mess (片付けたい女たち, Katadzuketai on'na-tachi)
- 2010: The Katari Chairs (かたりの椅子, Katari no isu)
- 2011: Single Mothers (シングルマザーズ, Shinguru mazāzu)
- 2014: Ougai's Mystery (鴎外の怪談, Ougai no kaidan)
