= Aya Ogawa (playwright) =

American playwright and translator (born 1974)

- Born: 1974 (age 51–52); Tokyo, Japan
- Occupations: playwright, translator, director
- Known for: experimental theater
- Awards: Doris Duke Artist Award
- Website: ayaogawa.com

Aya Ogawa (born 1974) is an American playwright, translator, stage director and actor based in Brooklyn, New York City. They are a translator of plays by contemporary Japanese playwrights, including several by Toshiki Okada. A recipient of the Doris Duke Artist Award, they won an Obie Award for their autofictional off-Broadway play The Nosebleed, which they wrote and directed.

== Early life ==
Ogawa was born in 1974 in Tokyo, Japan. At age two, they moved with their father, who worked for the Bank of Tokyo, to Houston, Texas, then Atlanta, Georgia, and, at age six, back to Tokyo. In 1985, the family moved to California, where Ogawa began acting in high school. They saw acting "as a way to channel the energy, tensions and experiences as a human being living in uncertain circumstances."

They moved to New York City to study drama at Columbia University, from which they graduated in 1997. After graduating, Ogawa became an American citizen and joined the theater company International WOW Company.

== Career ==
=== Early career ===
In 1999, Ogawa worked as rehearsal interpreter for Japanese playwright and director Yōji Sakate in New York, which led to Ogawa co-translating Sakate's play The Emperor and The Kiss.

Ogawa translated and directed Yasunari Kawabata's novel Beauty and Sadness in 2003. The International WOW Company presented Ogawa's adaptation of the story in May of that year, titled A Girl of 16, about a writer who wrote a novel about an affair he had with a sixteen-year-old girl which he is revisiting twenty years later, at the LaTea Theater. They left WOW in 2003 to pursue work as an individual artist. While working as a program officer at Japan Society, which Ogawa described as a "hugely influential" environment, as they previously had little interaction with Japanese people or the language outside of their childhood home, they formed their own theater company, Knife, Inc.

In 2004, Ogawa played Noam Chomsky in the Butane Group's The Loneliness of Noam Chomsky. Ogawa's play oph3lia, a triptych of contemporary characters derived from Ophelia, the character in Hamlet, was performed at Here Arts Center in June 2008.

Ogawa travelled to Japan with director Dan Rothenberg to observe Toshiki Okada in rehearsal as preparation to translate Okada's play Enjoy for Play Company, which Rothenberg was to direct. Ogawa's translation of Enjoy premiered at 59E59 Theaters in April 2010. Enjoy was the third Okada play that Ogawa translated.

In 2013 while in residency at Lower Manhattan Cultural Council's Workspace studio, Ogawa developed Ludic Proxy, which was under commission from Play Company. They directed the premier of Ludic Proxy at the off-off-Broadway theater Walkerspace in 2015. The play deals with virtual reality and includes audience participation in the form of a poll. The play received a mixed review in The New York Times and a "pan" by Helen Shaw in Time Out New York.

In 2018, they directed Haruna Lee's play Suicide Forest at the Bushwick Starr with Ma-Yi Theater Company. In March 2021, Japan Society and Play Company had presented part of Ludic Proxy in a revised, streaming version titled Ludic Proxy: Fukushima.

They were also a finalist for the Barbara Whitman Award in 2021.

=== Off-Broadway ===
A negative review of Ludic Proxy was a "catalyst" for Ogawa's 2021 play, The Nosebleed, an autobiographical work that deals with their relationship with their father. To Ogawa, the review had been a "devastating dismissal that lodged the notion of failure inside [them]," demanding examination. In the play, Ogawa plays their father at various ages, as well as their son, while four other actors play versions of Ogawa. The play includes a Japanese Buddhist funeral ritual in which the audience may participate. The Nosebleed opened in 2021 at Japan Society, and at Lincoln Center Theater's Claire Tow Theater in 2022. Ogawa received a 2023 Obie Award for the creation, writing, and direction of The Nosebleed. The show has toured, including presentations at Woolly Mammoth in Washington, DC, and On the Boards in Seattle.

Ogawa's play Meat Suit opened off-Broadway in February 2026 at the Pershing Square Signature Center presented by Second Stage Theater. Ogawa directed the comedy about motherhood.

Other directing credits include 9000 Paper Balloons, a multimedia puppet show previously shown as a recorded video, it premiered on stage at Japan Society in October 2022. They also directed Dan Fishback's Dan Fishback is Alive, Unwell, and Living in His Apartment, which has played at Joe's Pub.

Ogawa received a 2025 Doris Duke Artist Award.

They are a 2017-2026 resident playwright at New Dramatists.

== Awards and recognition ==
- 2021: Barbara Whitman Award (finalist)
- 2023: Obie Award
- 2025: Doris Duke Artist Award

== Personal life ==
Ogawa lives in Brooklyn and has two sons.

== Works ==
=== Playwright ===
- Serendipity, or a postmodern farce (10 minute play)
- Eating Dirt (one act), 1999
- a girl of 16 (adapted from Yasunari Kawabata's novel Beauty and Sadness), 2003
- oph3lia, 2008
- Artifact (one act), 2009
- Journey to the Ocean, 2010
- Ludic Proxy, 2015
- The Nosebleed, 2021
- Meat Suit, 2026

=== Selected translations ===
- The Bacchae – Holstein Milk Cows by Satoko Ichihara
- Enjoy by Toshiki Okada
- Five Days in March by Toshiki Okada
- Ground and Floor by Toshiki Okada
- Hot Pepper, Air Conditioner and the Farewell Speech by Toshiki Okada
- The Sonic Life of a Giant Tortoise by Toshiki Okada
- Zero Cost House by Toshiki Okada
