= New National Theatre Tokyo =

Opera house in Tokyo, Japan

New National Theatre, Tokyo
- 新国立劇場
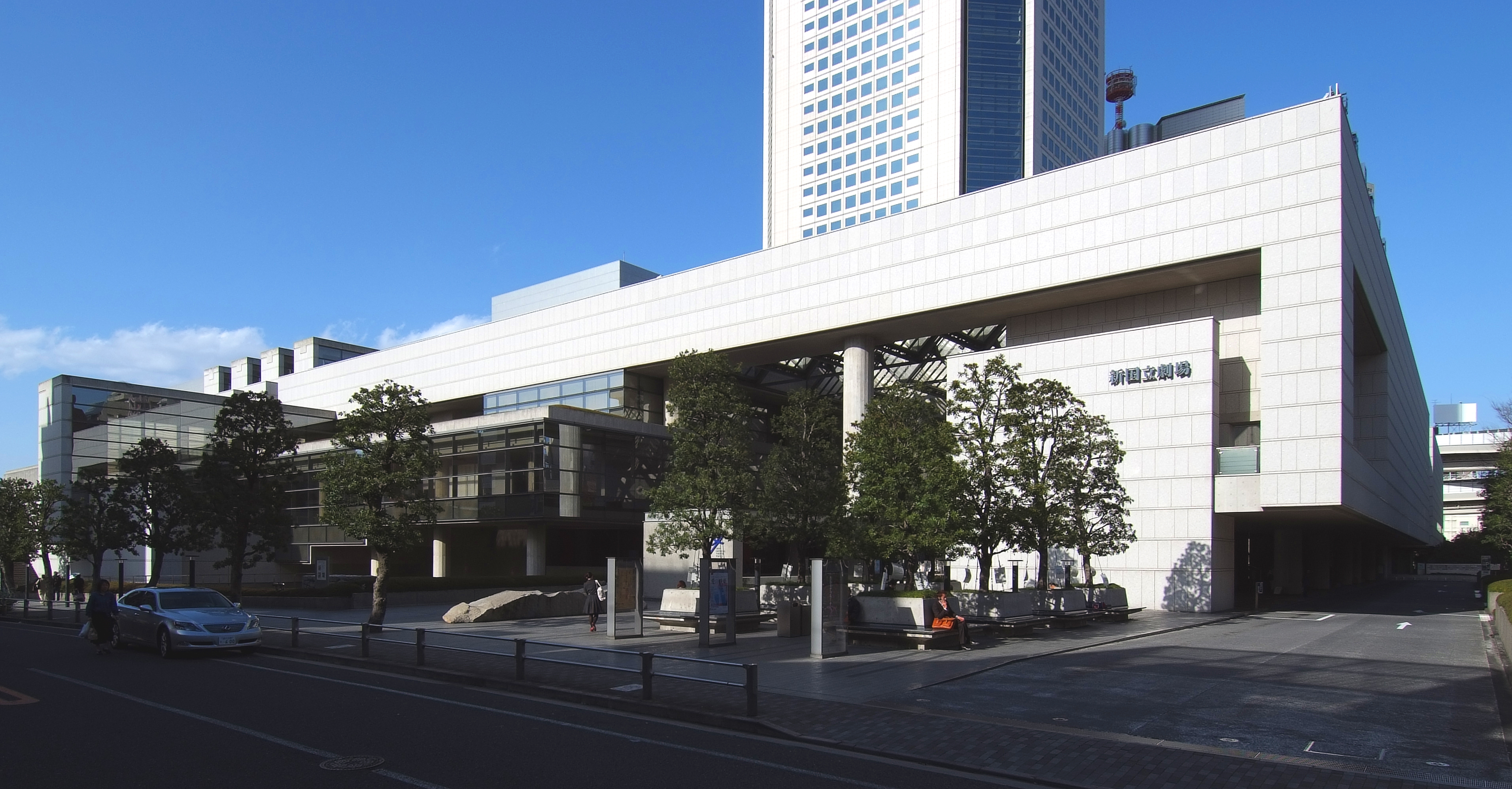
- New National Theatre, Tokyo
- Interactive map of New National Theatre, Tokyo
- Address: 1-1-1 Honmachi, Shibuya-ku; Tokyo; Japan
- Coordinates: 35°40′57″N 139°41′8″E
- Capacity: 1,814 (Opera House), 1,038 (Playhouse), 340-468 (The Pit)

Construction
- Opened: 1997
- Architect: Takahiko Yanagisawa

Website
- http://www.nntt.jac.go.jp/

The New National Theatre, Tokyo (NNTT) (新国立劇場, Shin Kokuritsu Gekijō) is Japan's first and foremost national centre for the performing arts, including opera, ballet, contemporary dance and drama. It is located in the Shinjuku area of Tokyo. Since 1997 more than 650 productions were staged. There are about 300 performances per season with approximately 200,000 theatergoers. The centre has been praised for its architecture and state-of-the-art modern theatre facilities, which are considered among the best in the world. In 2007, the NNTT was branded with the advertising slogan: Opera Palace, Tokyo.

== Background ==
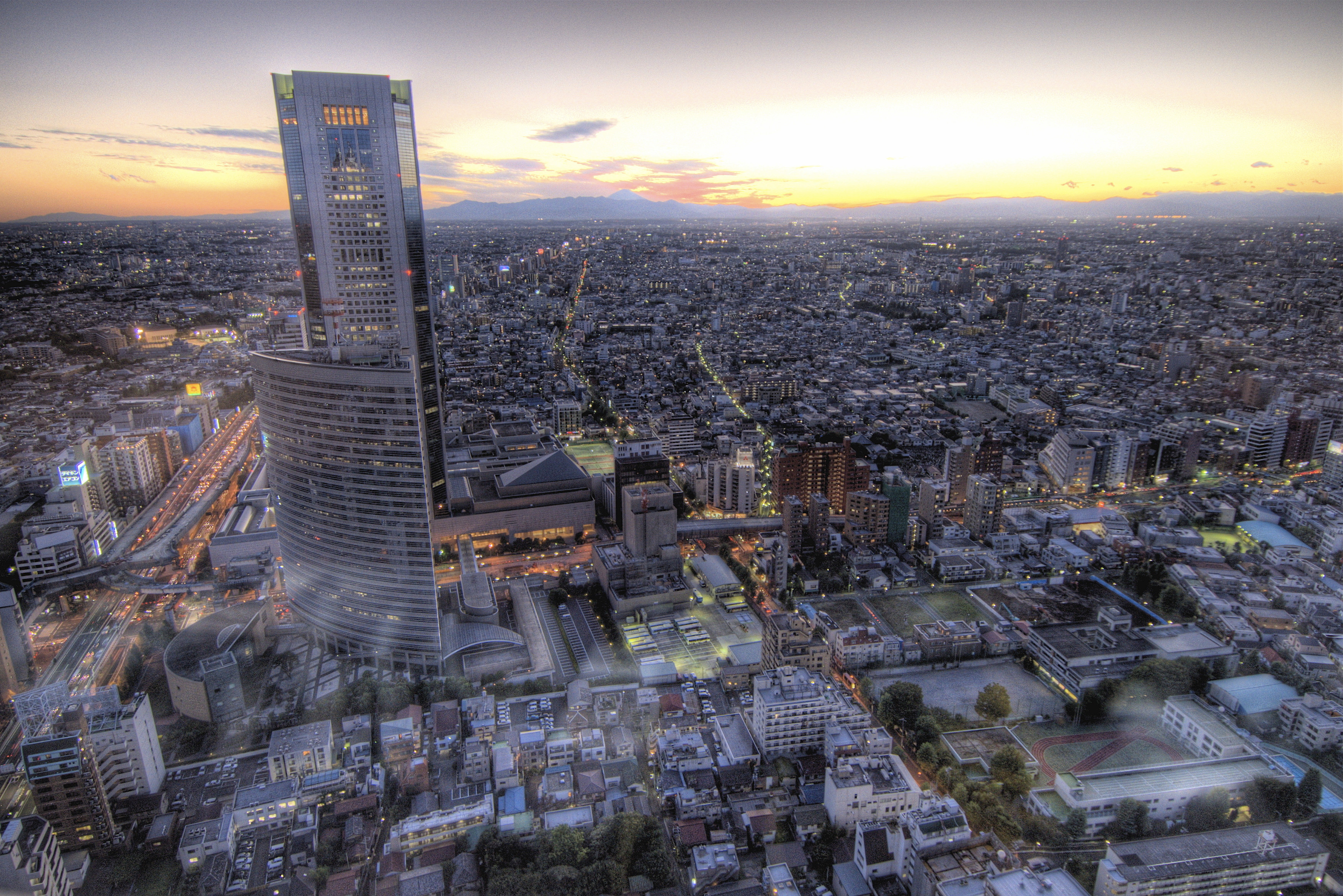
View of New National Theatre Tokyo and Tokyo Opera City Tower with Mount Fuji and sunset.

The construction of the NNTT was completed in February 1997. Its first public performances took place in October of that year. The Tokyo Opera City Tower is connected to the theatre. It has concert halls, an art gallery, a media-art museum, office space, many restaurants and shops. The combined complex of the skyscraper tower and the theatre is called the "Tokyo Opera City".

Besides the public performances, various enterprises are undertaken, such as the young artist training programs (for ballet, opera, and theatre), theatre rental for other performing arts groups, performing arts-related exhibitions, public usage of its video library and book library, public performances for children and young students, backstage tours, and most importantly, international exchanges for performing arts events, etc. Moreover, The Stage Set & Design Centre (located in Choshi city, Chiba Prefecture) stores and exhibits previously used stage scenery and costumes.

The arts management of NNTT, including the enterprises in above, is commissioned to New National Theatre Foundation (NNTF) from the independent administrative institution, known as The Japan Arts Council. NNTT is managed by several trust funds, government grants, admission revenues, and private donations from many supporting companies.

=== Criticism ===
The NNTT has been repeatedly criticized for its bureaucratic arts administration, which is very representative of usual Japanese politics. Although NNTT is financed by the Japanese government, major conductors, directors, and performing artists have all complained that their creative ideas are restricted by the bureaucratic style of the arts management. In 2010, the government decided to cut down the ¥4.8 billion grant NNTT received the previous year by half, and reduce the government grants to trainees who want to work and study abroad.

== Theatres and performance facilities ==
- Steel reinforced concrete construction 5 floors above ground, 4 floors below ground
- Total floor area: 68,879 m^{2} (741,410 sq ft)
- Design: Takahiko Yanagisawa + TAK Architectural Institute
- The NNTT contains three main theaters.

=== Opera House (Opera Palace) ===
- Number of seats: 1,814
- There are 4 seats on the 1st to 4th floors.
- Mainly used for performances such as opera and ballet. There have been several concerts in the past.
- An orchestra pit with a maximum of 120 players (4 pipes) is permanent, and the depth can be adjusted according to the performance.
- A proscenium format with four stages. Using the upper and lower back stage mechanism, performances are often swapped.
- Opera subtitle devices are installed on the left and right sides of the stage, and are displayed in vertical writing.
- The theater solicited nicknames, and on March 29, 2007, the opera palace (OPERA PALACE Tokyo) was decided.

=== Playhouse ===
- Proscenium format: 1,038 seats, open format: 1,010 seats
- There are two seats on the first and second floors.
- Mainly used for performances such as theater and contemporary dance. Opera and ballet performances are also possible.
- There is also a four-stage stage and a temporary orchestra pit.

=== The Pit ===
- Number of seats: 340-468 seats
- Located on B1F.
- It has a movable stage and seat.
- It is used for performances of contemporary stage performances with open stage performances.

=== Other ===
- Information center (5F), rehearsal room (B2F), training room, roof garden (5F), etc.
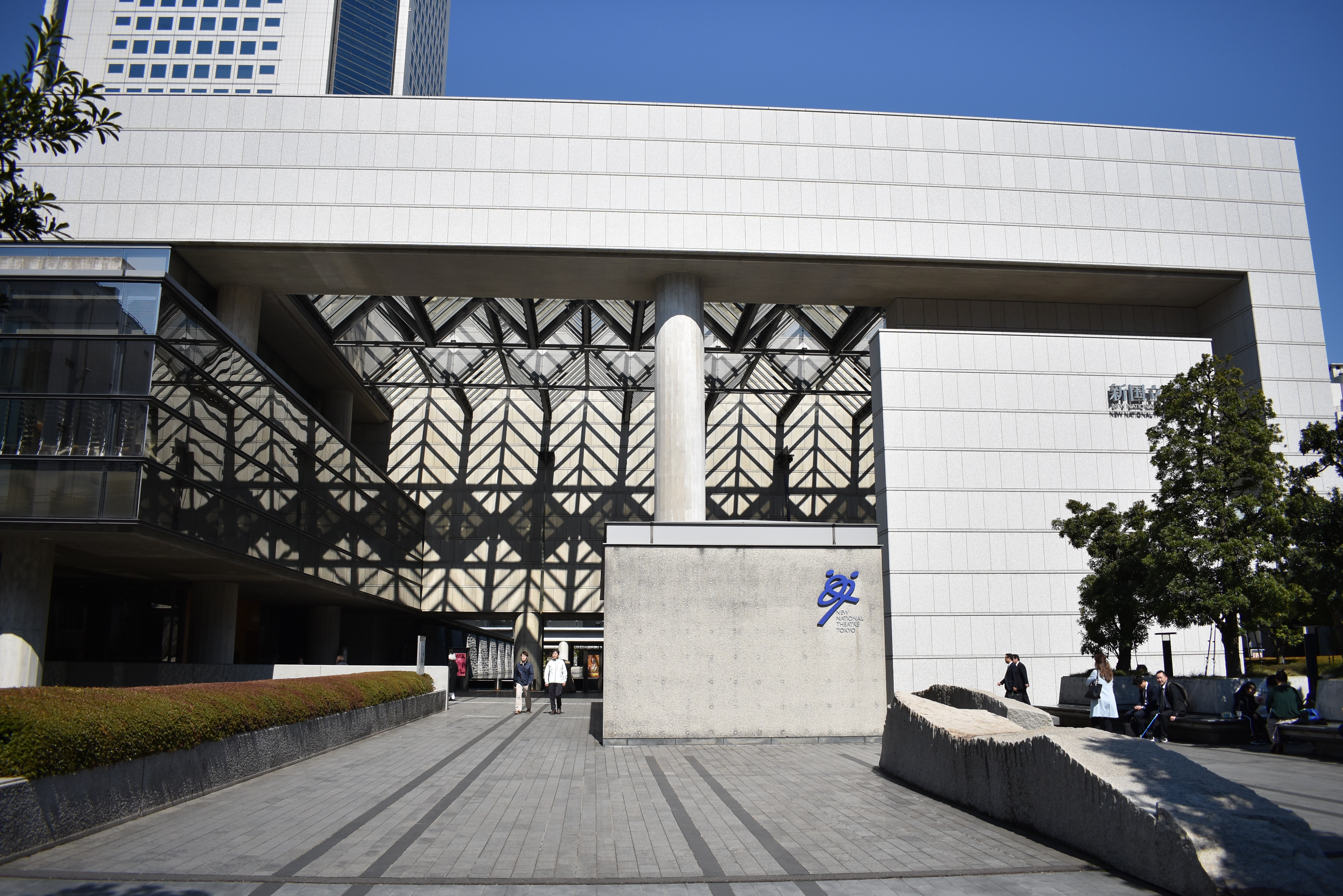
Approach (2019)

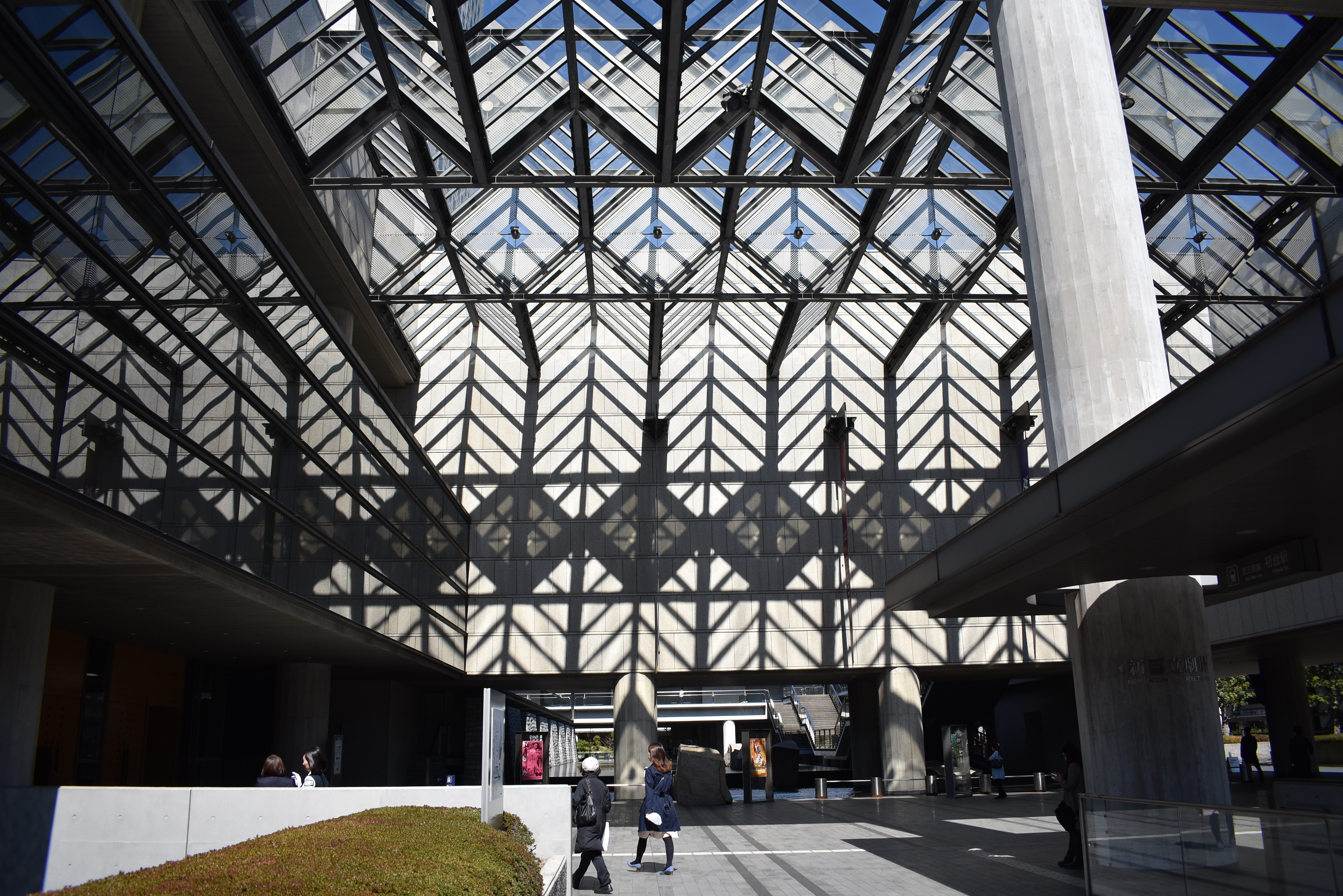
Promenade (2019)

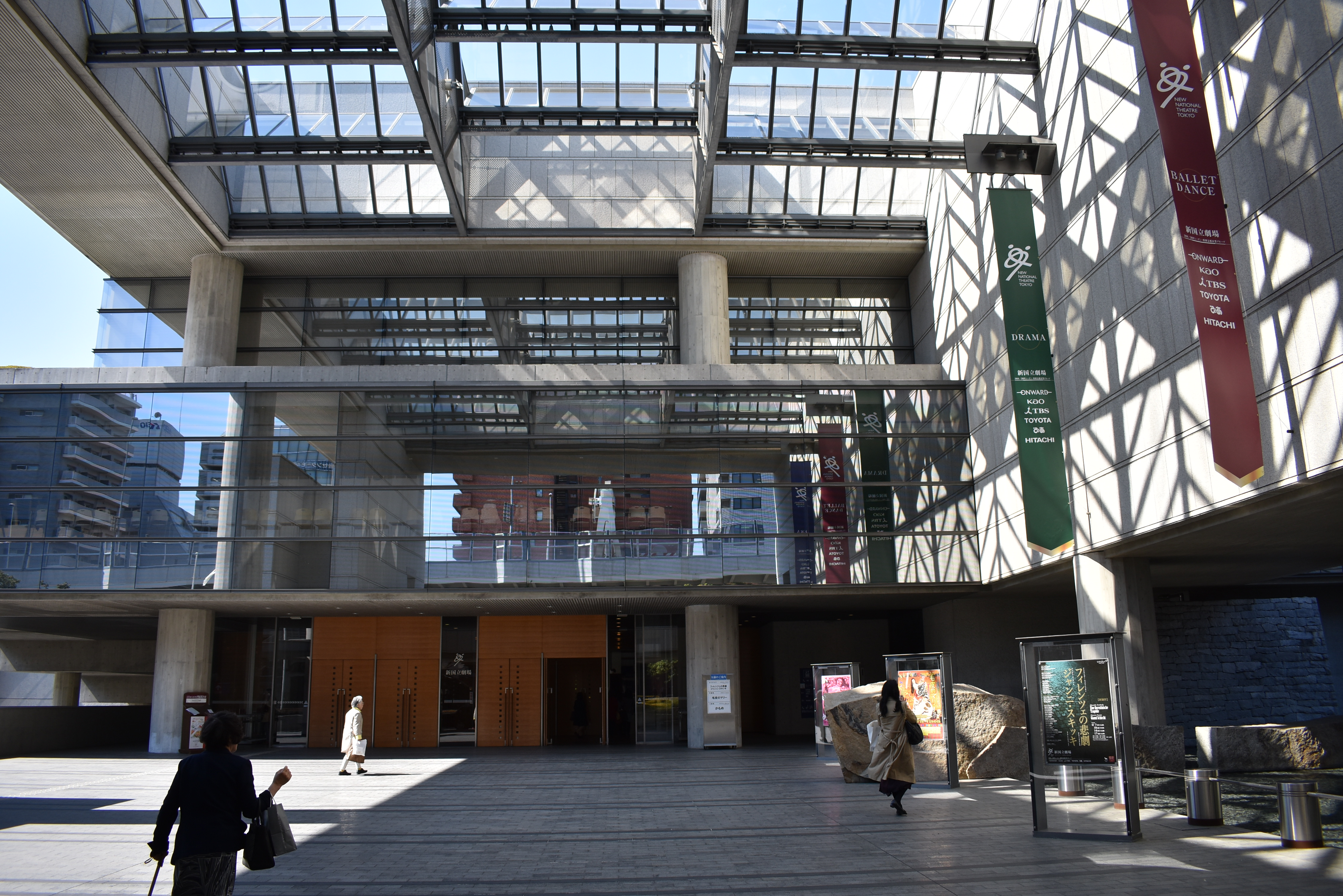
Promenade (2019)

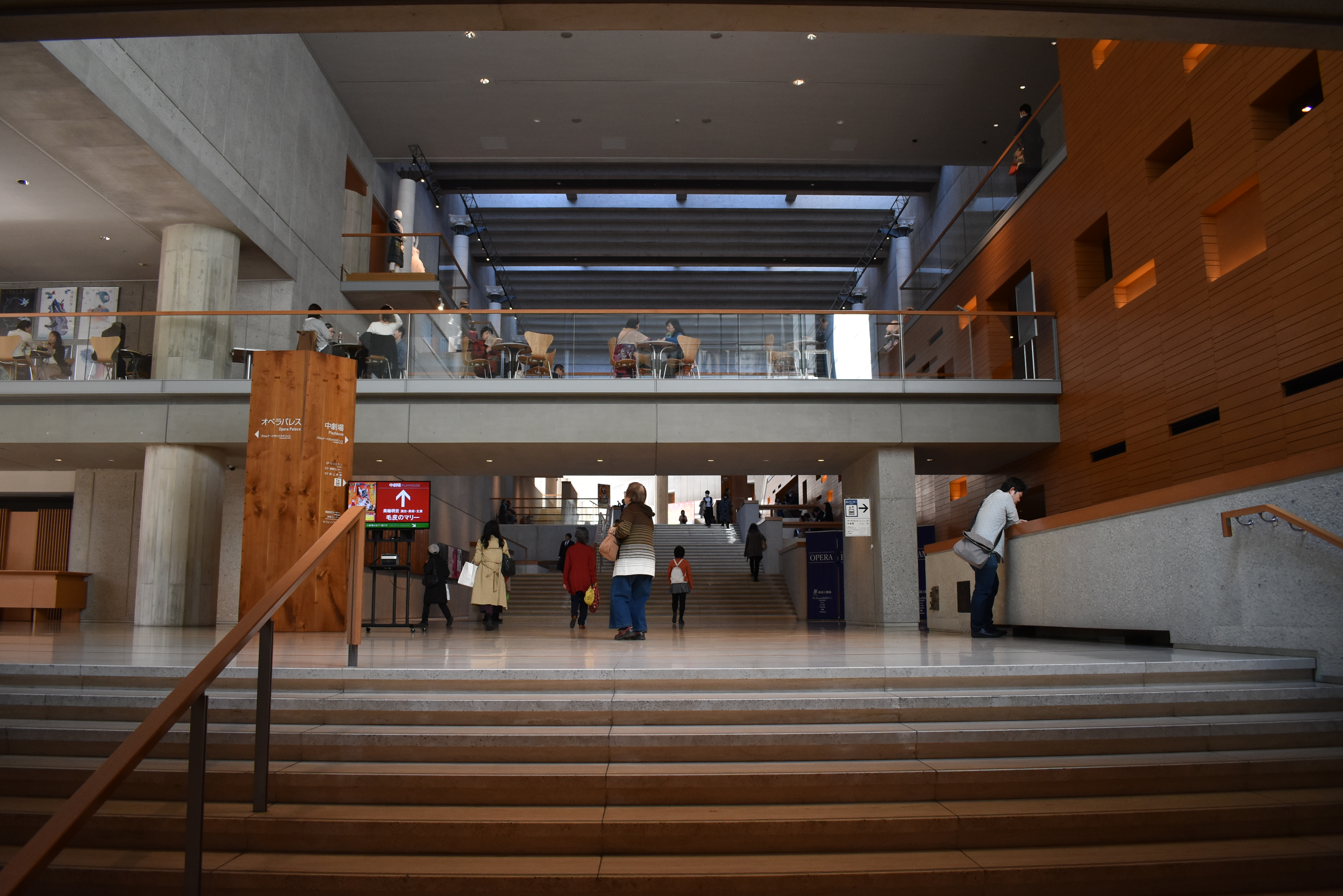
Main entrance (2019)

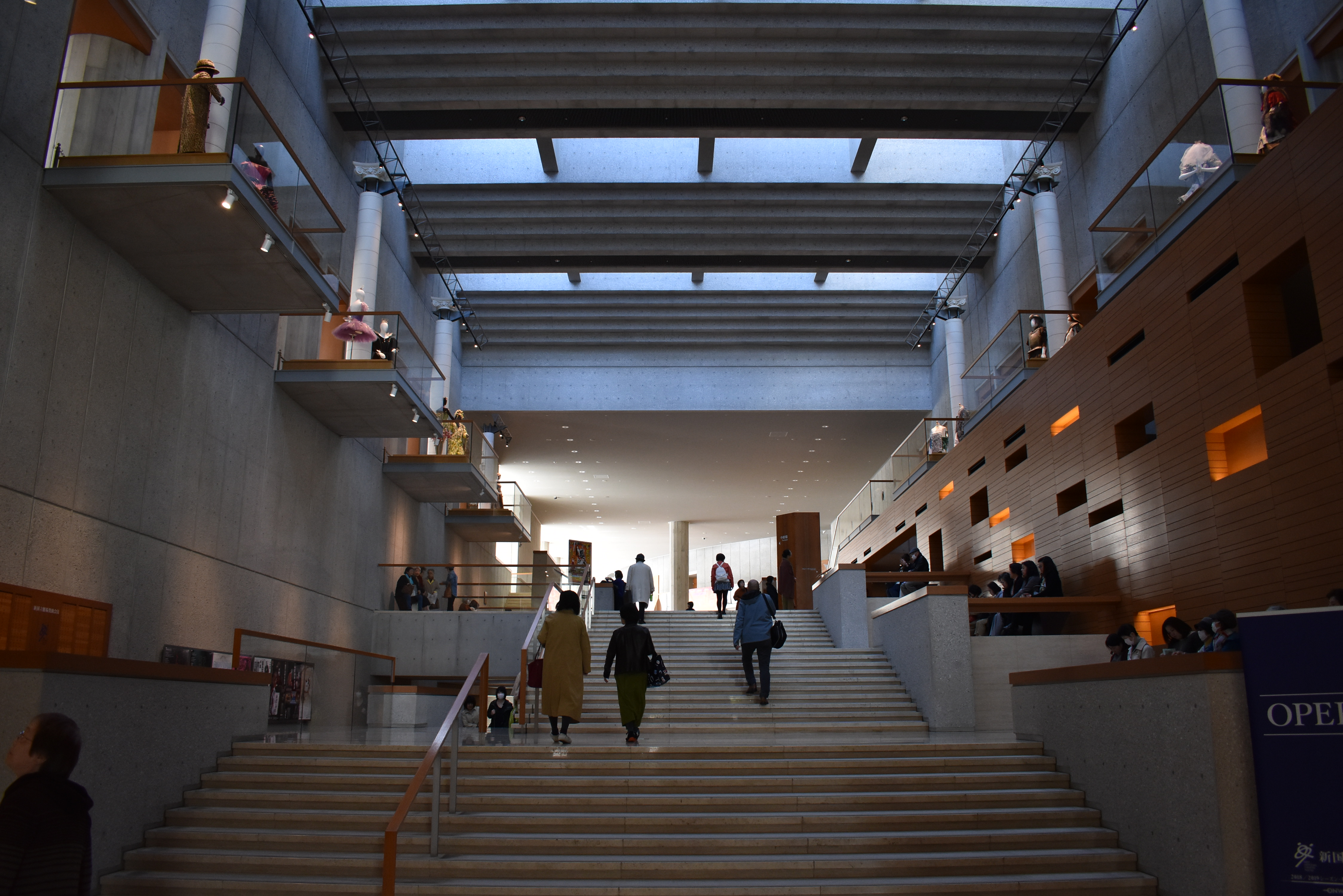
Foyer (2019)

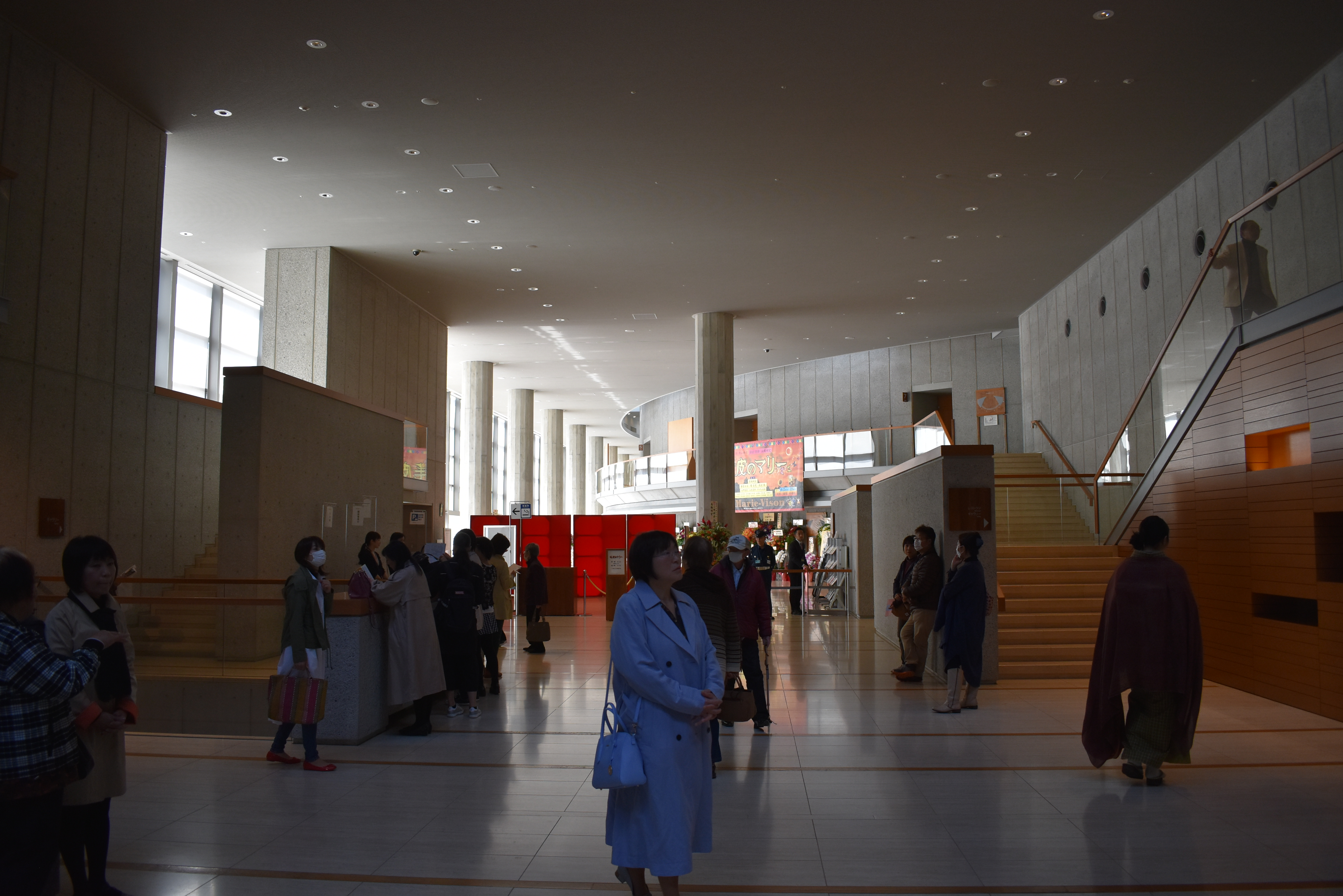
Middle Theater Foyer (2019)

== New National Theatre Opera (NNTO) ==
In 2005, conductor Hiroshi Wakasugi was named artistic consultant to the opera division of the New National Theatre (also known as New National Theatre Opera, or NNTO). This post preceded his appointment as artistic director (i.e. Music Director of the New National Theatre) from September 2007. However, Wakasugi died in July 2009 and Tadaaki Otaka was appointed as 'acting artistic director' for 2009/2010.

The company's productions are usually conservative, and the principal lead singers are frequently drawn from a circle of top foreign opera singers from Europe and elsewhere. World-class Japanese singers who are famous abroad are often invited to sing lead roles as well. To introduce Japanese-related works into the operatic world, the NNTO has embarked on producing works such as Shuzenji Monogatari, composed by Osamu Shimizu (June 2009), and Ikebe Shinichiro's Rokumeikan (June 2010).

== New National Theatre Ballet (NNTB) ==
The current Artistic Director of the New National Theatre Ballet (otherwise known as NNTB) is Miyako Yoshida, who was the first Japanese principal dancer at the Royal Ballet. Frequent foreign guest artists include Svetlana Zakharova and Denis Matvienko. The company's balletic identity draws from Russian, British, and French classical ballet traditions. The NNBT has performed at the Kennedy Center in Washington, D.C. (Asami Maki's Raymonda in February 2008), and performed Asami Maki's version of La dame aux camellias, as a guest company at the Bolshoi Theatre in September 2009.

== Artistic director selection controversy ==
In the summer of 2008, the government-appointed theater board officials decided to replace artistic director Hitoshi Uyama with Keiko Miyata. The decision was announced at a June 30 board meeting, taking many of the board members by surprise because no prior discussion of replacing the director had taken place. When one of the board members, Ai Nagai, tried to question the decision, her questions were ignored by the board presidency. Nagai later went public with her questions on the decision in a statement signed by other prominent theater dramatists, including Hisashi Inoue, Yukio Ninagawa, and Yōji Sakate, but the board never responded to the questions.

Preceded by TBS Broadcasting Center	Host of the Japan Record Awards; 2004 – present	Succeeded by current
