= Rio Kishida =

Japanese playwright and director

- Born: January 3, 1946; Okaya, Nagano Prefecture, Japan
- Died: June 28, 2003 (aged 57); Okaya, Nagano Prefecture, Japan
- Occupations: dramatist, writer

Rio Kishida (岸田 理生, Kishida Rio; 1946–2003) was a Japanese playwright and director. She wrote several plays about women and the problems they faced in a patriarchal society that run parallel with the second wave of the feminist movement in Japan. Even though she did not strictly identify herself as a feminist, she believed that the system of a male dominated society had to change in order for women to gain equal rights as their male counterpart.

== Biography ==
=== Early life and career ===
Kishida was born in 1946 in the Nagano Prefecture, Japan. In 1974, Kishida graduated from the Law School of Chuo University. She was qualified for the bar, but instead chose to join Shūji Terayama’s theater company Tenjō Sajiki (Ceiling Gallery). She collaborated with Terayama, who she viewed as a mentor, in writing Shintokumaru (Poison Boy), The Audience Seats, and Lemmings. Even though Terayama had collaborated with several people, Kishida was the only one in his troupe to have collaborated with him several times. It is not clear as to who wrote which parts of the plays.

Kishida, with the permission from Terayama, founded her own company Because of My Older Brother Theater and wrote her own plays that were independent from Tenjō Sajiki in 1978. Kishida wanted to write plays about women and issues that they faced against as the main focus. Kishida changed the name of her theater company to The Kishida Office after she had left Tenjō Sajiki in 1981. It wasn't until after her mentor's death in 1983 that she had established herself as being completely independent from Tenjō Sajiki and left Terayama's shadow.

=== Later life and career ===
In 1983, The Kishida Office became The Kishida Office & The Optimists Group after merging with Yoshio Wada's theater company, The Optimists Group. Kishida's play Itojigoku (Thread Hell), was first produced in 1984 and won the Kishida Prize for Drama in 1985. She began to write her plays independently again after 1993 with her company, The Kishida Rio Company. At this time, she was interested in Korea's art and even invited Korean actors to create bilingual plays with the actors of her company. Her play Tori yo, Tori yo, Aoi Tori yo (Bird, Bird, Blue Bird!) deals with the destruction of Korea's language and culture due to Japan's occupation in Korea.

While working with the Singaporean director Ong Keng Sen, Kishida rewrote several of William Shakespeare's plays for performances in multiple languages. In 1997, Kishida wrote Lear and Ong Keng Sen was the director of the play. She wrote her own version of Othello in 2001 called Desdemona. Both Desdemona and Lear were written with characters from all around the world and different backgrounds including a noh actor, a Burmese puppeteer, and a Korean musician. Kishida became the lead organizer of 3rd Asian Women's Theatre Conference after Kahoru Kisaragi died in 2001.

She died on June 28, 2003, at a hospital in Okaya. Each year on the anniversary of her death, members of her theater company hold an event called RIOFEST, where actors and companies come together and perform Kishida's plays.

== Works ==
=== Knock ===
Knock was one of her collaborative plays with Terayama. Many people collaborated in creating the play that experimented with multiple authorship, but Kishida was responsible for writing a large portion of the play, including the public bath sequence. Knock was one of Tenjō Sajiki's largest street performances. The sequences of the play were dictated by a "time schedule", but actors were free to say their lines whenever they wanted to. The actors body movements were also regarded as being more important to the performance than the spoken dialogue.

=== Thread Hell ===
The play Thread Hell takes place in a silk thread factory, which is in reality a prostitution house, in 1939. The story revolves around 12 women, all named after Hanafuda cards, and two girls named Mayu (meaning cocoon) and a girl referred to as School Girl. Mayu comes to the factory in search of her mother and has no memories. After she finds her mother amongst the workers at the factory, Mayu becomes infuriated that her mother chose to be a prostitute and abandon her role as a mother to Mayu. In a fit of anger and an attempt to cut all connections with her mother, Mayu kills her mother. The play criticizes what little power women have in a traditional family oriented household. The silk thread factory represents a family house and the women are a part of the house, but do not have full membership and rights that the rest of the family have. The factory can also be seen as a metaphor for the Japanese state where the links (threads) between women are not recorded in the national family record (koseki).
