= Haruna Lee =

American dramatist and playwright (born 1985)

- Born: 1985 (age 40–41); Hong Kong
- Occupations: Experimental Playwright, Theater Maker, Professor
- Writing career
- Notable work: Suicide Forest
- Notable awards: Obie Award; Guggenheim Fellowship
- Website: www.harunalee.com/home

Haruna Lee (born 1985) is a Taiwanese-Japanese-American experimental playwright, theater maker, educator, and community steward based in Brooklyn, New York.

== Early life and education ==
Lee was born in Hong Kong and grew up in Japan. They moved from Japan to the United States when they were eight. They received an undergraduate degree from the Experimental Theatre Wing at Tisch School of the Arts NYU, and later received their graduate degree from Brooklyn College's MFA Playwriting Program under the mentorship of Mac Wellman and Erin Courtney.

== Career ==
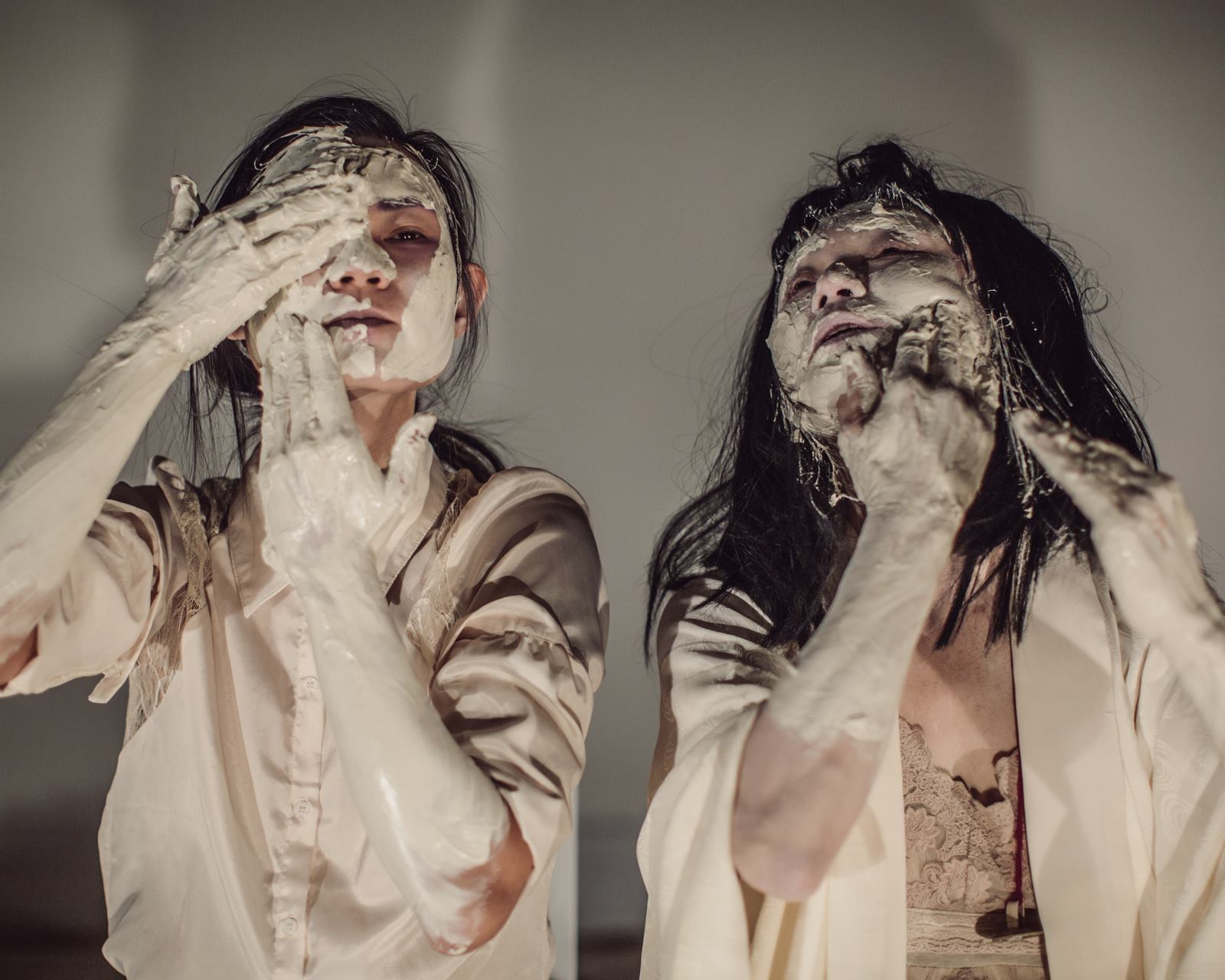
Communing with You at Brooklyn Arts Exchange, 2016. Haruna Lee and Aoi Lee.

In 2010, Lee started the Harunalee Theater Company (stylized as harunalee theater company) with Stivo Arnoczy, Sasha Arutyunova, Karen Boyer, Andrew R. Butler, Greg Laffey, Sarah Lurie, and Lauren Swan-Potras; an ensemble of theater makers and designers collaborating across artistic disciplines to create experimental plays helmed by Lee. They produced six shows: TROIKA, Plum de Force, Drunkfish Oceanrant, War Lesbian, to the left of the pantry and under the sugar shack, and Memory Retrograde. They received support from Ars Nova's Makers Lab, Brooklyn Arts Exchange Artist-in-Residence program, Dixon Place Mondo Cane! Residency and Commission, The Public's Devised Theatre Working Group, The Foundation for Contemporary Arts, The Indie Theater Fund, The Mental Insight Foundation, and The Lower Manhattan Cultural Council Arts Grant. The company disbanded in 2020.

As an experimental playwright, Lee created and performed in plural (love), a collaboration with Jen Goma and various artists, an auto-theoretical performance installation that flirts with the boundaries of desire, power, and responsibility, creating a performance piece that feels like stepping into a soft BDSM roleplay. Between 2016–2021, they developed the project with New Georges, the Soho Rep Writer/Director Lab, and WP Pipeline Festival. In 2022, they premiered a short film with the same title. In 2016, Lee performed Communing with You with their mother, Aoi Lee. The 30-minute Butoh piece was performed at Brooklyn Arts Exchange.

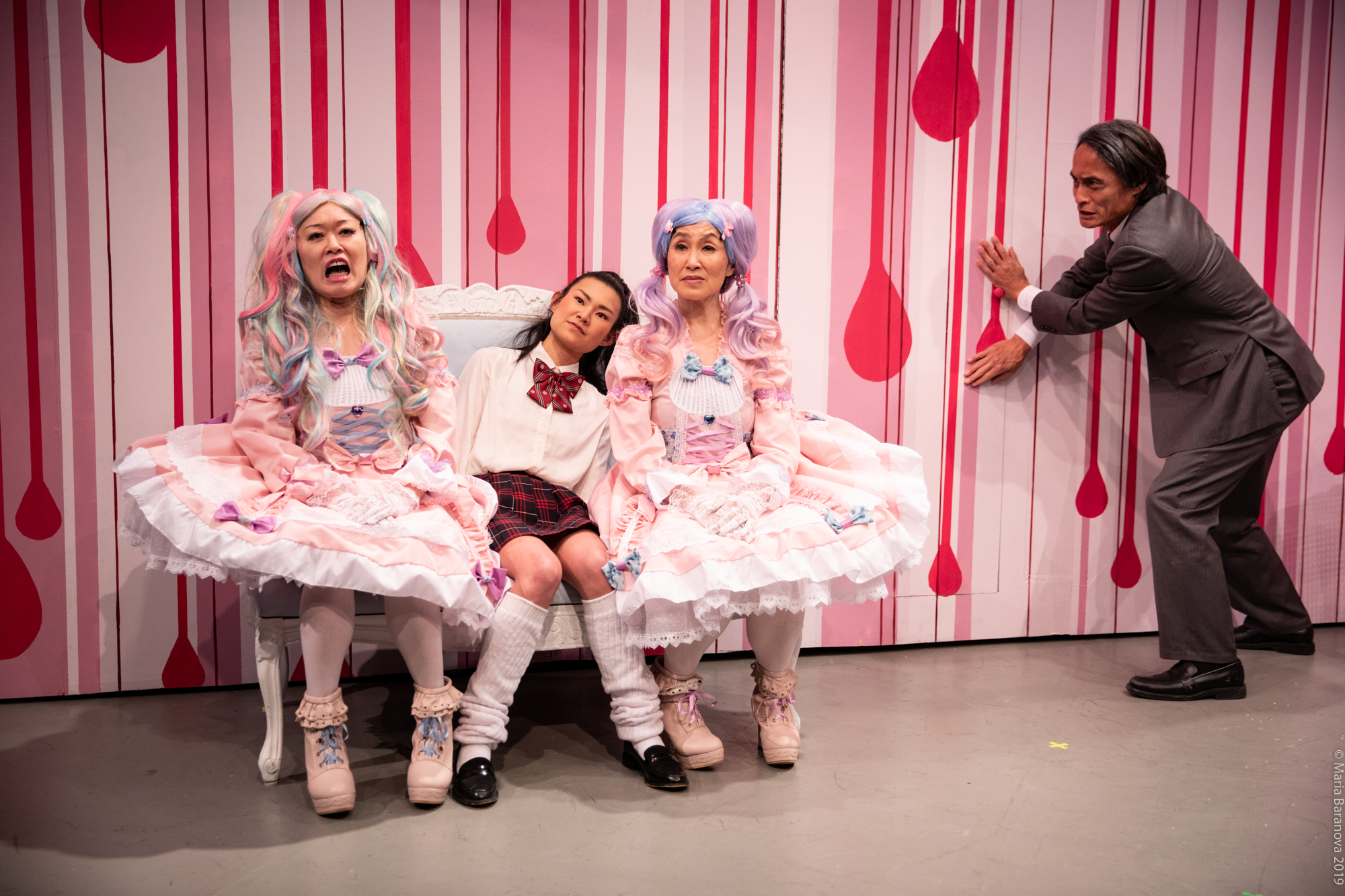
Production of Suicide Forest at The Bushwick Starr, March 2019.

Lee's most notable play, Suicide Forest, premiered in 2019 at The Bushwick Starr with Ma-Yi Theater Company and was directed by Aya Ogawa and was performed by Haruna Lee, alongside their mother Aoi Lee. It is an investigation of how Japanese suicide has symbolically permeated the playwright's identity, and received grants from the MAP Fund, the National Endowment for the Arts, and the New York State Council for the Arts. It was hailed by the New York Times as "Vivid, haunted, heart-stingingly tender and explicitly personal... A wild ride of a production and was a Critic's Pick. It received an Off-Broadway remount in 2020 with Ma-Yi Theater Company at A.R.T/NY and won an Obie Award in Playwriting and made The Kilroys List. The remount ran for two weeks before shutting down due to Covid. In 2023, Lee was invited to join the New Dramatists' resident playwright company until 2030. Lee began developing their play 49 Days, a bilingual radio play about what's gained and what's lost when a family holds too tightly to their grief and rage, at the Eugene O'Neill Theater Center's National Playwrights Conference in 2025, with previous workshops from New Dramatists, Playwrights Horizons, and Ma-Yi Theater Company. It is slated to premiere with the National Asian American Theater Company and New Georges in 2027.

Lee has also begun work on DADBOT, a hybrid technology performance piece where they resurrect their dead dad using conversational AI to be in a simulation of the iconic father-child conversation. They received the Berkeley Rep Ground Floor Residency and a Mercury Store residency. In 2025, they won a Creative Capital Award for DADBOT.

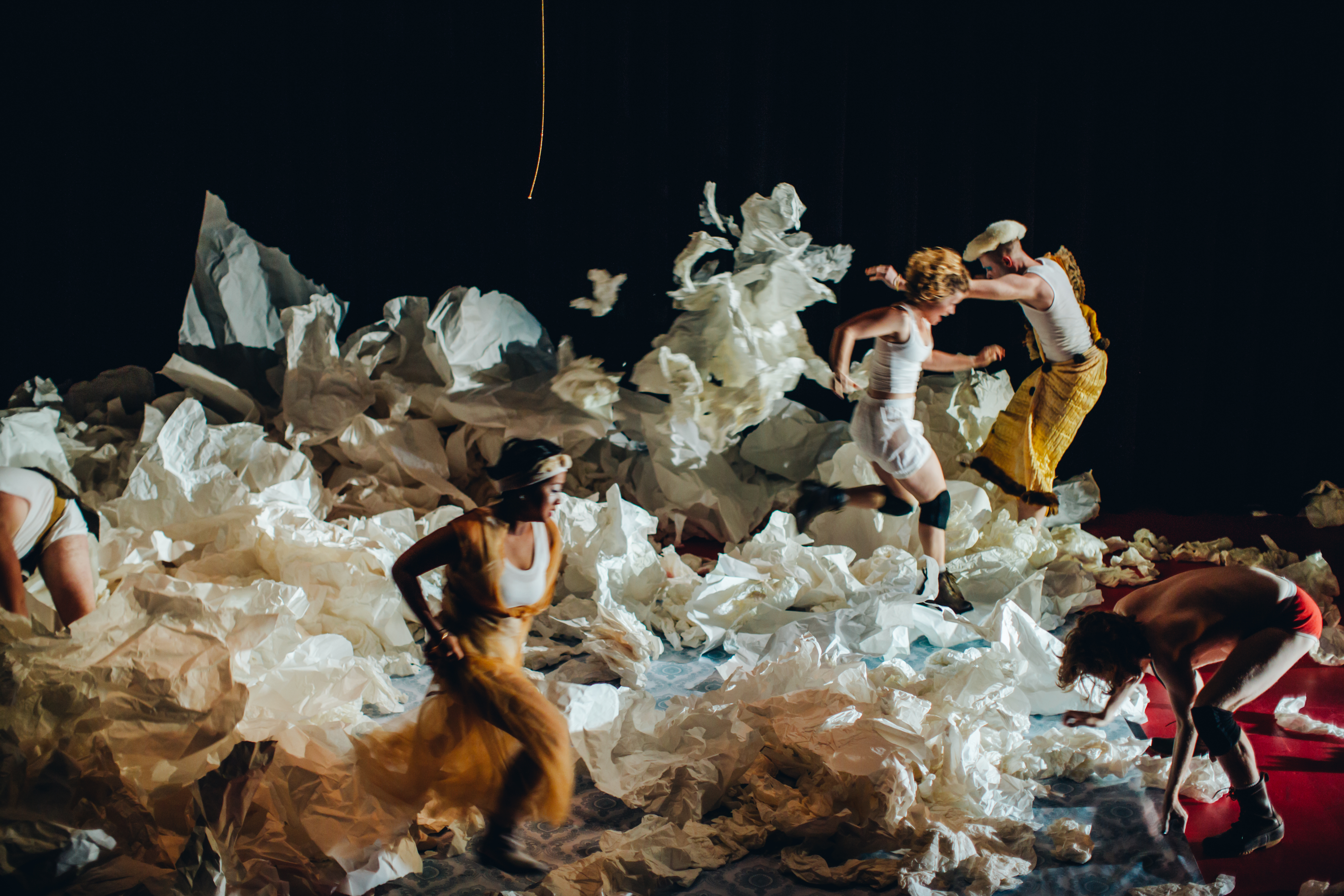
Production of War Lesbian at Dixon Place, Dec 2014.

Lee received the Guggenheim Fellowship in 2026, and was a 2025 finalist for the Susan Smith Blackburn Prize receiving a Special Commendation for 49 Days. They have also won the Steinberg Playwriting Award (2021), The Bret Adams and Paul Reisch Foundation Ollie New Play Award (2021), and a Foundation for Contemporary Arts Grants to Artists Award (2021). Their writing has been published by Broadway Licensing, Yale's Theater Magazine, Table Work Press, and 53rd State Press.

As a performer and writer, they have collaborated with artists such as Lynn Nottage, Vanessa German, Mac Wellman, Taylor Mac, Minor Theater, Ralph Lee and the Mettawee River Theater Company, Anohni, and many more.

Lee teaches at Yale University and Hunter College in the MFA Playwriting Programs. They have previously taught at Brooklyn College, Stanford, NYU, Pace University, and York College.

== Personal life ==
Lee is half Japanese and half Taiwanese.

== Plays ==
- Troika
- Plum de Force
- Drunkfish Oceanrant
- Communing with You
- Suicide Forest
- War Lesbian
- to the left of the pantry and under the sugar shack
- Memory Retrograde* plural (love)
- DADBOT
- 49 Days

== Filmography ==
=== Television ===
Year	Television show	Credited as writer	Notes	Ref.
2020	The Flight Attendant	Yes	Season 2	
2022	Pachinko	Yes	Season 2	

== Awards and nominations ==
Year	Award	Category	Work	Result	Ref.
2020	Obie Awards	Playwriting	Suicide Forest	Won	
2021	Ollie New Play Award	Playwriting	n/a	Won	
2021	FCA Grants to Artists Award	Theater	n/a	Won	
2021	Steinberg Playwright Awards	n/a	n/a	Won	
2025	Susan Smith Blackburn Award	Playwriting	49 Days	Finalist, Special Commendation	
2025	Creative Capital Award	Theater & Performance Art	DADBOT	Won	
2026	Guggenheim Fellowship	Drama & Performance Art	DADBOT	Won	
