= Masakazu Yamazaki =

Japanese writer (1934–2020)

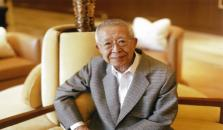
- Born: 26 March 1934; Kyoto, Empire of Japan
- Died: 19 August 2020 (aged 86); Hyōgo Prefecture, Japan
- Occupations: Playwright; Philosopher; Literary critic

Masakazu Yamazaki (山崎 正和, Yamazaki Masakazu; 26 March 1934 – 19 August 2020) was a Japanese writer, literary critic, and philosopher.

== Biography ==
Born in Kyoto, Yamazaki grew up in Manchuria during World War II. He studied philosophy with a concentration in aesthetics and art history at Kyoto University. After his studies in Kyoto, he studied at Yale University from 1965 to 1967, where he would also teach. Upon his return to Japan, he taught at Kansai University and, until his retirement, at Osaka University. In 1972, alongside Minoru Betsuyaku, he co-founded the Te no Kai theatre company, where he wrote the plays Fune wa Hosen yo and Mokuzō Haritsuke.

Yamazaki's most well-known play, Zeami, was dedicated to the founder of the Noh genre of theatre, Zeami Motokiyo. For this play, he won the Kishida Prize for Drama in 1963. In 1975, he won the Mainichi Shuppan Bunka Shō for Yamiagari no Amerika. In 1984, he was awarded Yomiuri Prize for Oedipus shōten and the Yoshino-Sakuzō Prize for Yawarakai kojinshugi no tanjō. In 2006, he was named as a Person of Cultural Merit, and in 2011, he received the Prize of the Japanese Academy of Arts.

Yamazaki died in the Hyōgo Prefecture on 19 August 2020 at the age of 86.
