= Kishida Prize for Drama =

Japanese theater award

The Kishida Prize for Drama (岸田國士戯曲賞, Kishida Kunio Gikyokushō) is a Japanese theater award given by the publisher Hakusuisha in honor of the playwright Kunio Kishida. It was begun in 1955 to honor new playwrights, and is known in Japan as the gateway to recognition for contemporary playwrights.

== List of winners ==
=== 1955–1960 ===
- 1955 - Not awarded
  - Honorable mention: Hekiga (壁画) Seiichi Yashiro
- 1956 - Kiichi Ohashi for Kusunoki Sankichi no seishun (楠三吉の青春) and Kinji Obata for Kikeiji (畸形児)
- 1957 - Not awarded
  - Honorable mention: Ashita o tsumuzu musumetachi (明日を紡ぐ娘たち)
- 1958 - Hotta Hotta Kiyomi for Shima (島)
- 1959 - Not awarded
  - Honorable mention: Nagai Bohyō no retsu (長い墓標の列) Yoshiyuki Fukuda and Gyoko (漁港) of Gen'ichi Hara and Yūjōbutōkai (友情舞踏会) Masayuki Hiroda
- 1960 - Masaru Kobayashi for Ori (檻) and Hisako Hayasaka for Saga (相聞)

=== 1961–1970 ===
- 1961 - Not awarded
- 1962 - Ken Miyamoto for Nihonjin tami Kyowakoku (日本人民共和国) The sakusen Mechanism (メカニズム作戦) and Shuichiro Yagi for Hatoba Kojiki rokunin no musukotachi (波止場乞食と六人の息子たち) (The Beggar Docks and Six Sons) and Kombeya wa tomaranai (コンベヤーは止まらない) (The Conveyor Belt That Never Stops)
- 1963 - Masakazu Yamazaki for Zeami Motokiyo (世阿彌)
- 1964 - Hitomi Kakuhiko for Tomoe no tsuzumi (友絵の鼓) and Ryuichi Suga for Onna no Gongyo (女の勤行) and Yoshiyuki Fukuda for Hakamatare wa doko da (袴垂れはどこだ)
- 1965 - Not awarded
- 1966 - Koji Kawamata for Kantō heiya (関東平野) and Masayuki Hirota for Suna to shiro (砂と城)
- 1968 - Minoru Betsuyaku for Match uri no Shōjo (マッチ売りの少女) and Akai tori no iru Fukei (赤い鳥の居る風景)
- 1969 - Satoshi Akihama for Yōjitachi no ato no matsuri (幼児たちの後の祭り) ua
- 1970 - Juro Kara for Shōjo kamen (少女仮面)

=== 1971–1980 ===
- 1971 - Makoto Sato for Nezumi Kozō Jirokichi (鼠小僧次郎吉)
- 1972 - Hisashi Inoue to Dōgen no Bōken (道元の冒険)
- 1974 - Kōhei Tsuka for Atami satsujin jiken (熱海殺人事件) and Kunio Shimizu for Bokura ga hijo no taiga o kudaru Toki (ぼくらが非情の大河をくだるとき)
- 1975 - Not awarded
  - Honorable mention: Mokuren numa (木蓮沼) Tomiko Ishizawa
- 1976 - Tomiko Ishizawa for Biwa-den (琵琶伝)
- 1977 - Not awarded
- 1978 - Shōgo Oda Komachi kaze-den (小町風伝) and Seishin Chinen for Jinruikan (人類館)
- 1979 - Kodai Okabe for Hizen Matsuura kenmai shinjū (肥前松浦兄妹心中)
- 1980 - Ren Saitō for Vance King Shanghai (上海バンスキング)

=== 1981–1990 ===
- 1981 - Jūichirō Takeuchi for Ano daikarasu saemo (あの大鴉,さえも)
- 1982 - Tetsu Yamazaki for Hyōryū kazoku (漂流家族) and Uo densetsu (うお伝説)
- 1983 - Hideki Noda for Nokemono kitarite (野獣降臨) and Kiyokazu Yamamoto for Pinocchio janbaraya (比野置ジャンバラヤ) and Eri Watanabe for Gegege no ge (ゲゲゲのげ)
- 1984 - Sō Kitamura for Jūichijin no shōnen (十一人の少年)
- 1985 - Rio Kishida for Ito jigoku (糸地獄)
- 1986 - Takeshi Kawamura for Shinjuku Hakkenden daiikkan inu no tanjo (新宿八犬伝第一巻-犬の誕生-)
- 1987 - Not awarded
- 1988 - Yasuhiko Ohashi for Gojira (ゴジラ)
- 1989 - Riyo Iwamatsu for Futon to daruma (蒲団と達磨)
- 1990 - Not awarded

=== 1991–2000 ===
- 1991 - Yōji Sakate for Breathless Gomibukuro o kokyūsuru no yoru monogatari (ブレスレスゴミ袋を呼吸する夜の物語)
- 1992 - Kensuke Yokouchi for Gusha ni wa mienai La Mancha no Osama no hadaka (愚者には見えないラ·マンチャの王様の裸)
- 1993 - Akio Miyazawa for Hinemi (ヒネミ) and Miri Yū for Sakana no matsuri (魚の祭)
- 1994 - Yoshinobu Tei for Za Terayama (ザ·寺山)
- 1995 - Shoji Kokami for Sunafukin no tegami (スナフキンの手紙) and Orisa Horisa for Tokyo nōto (東京ノート)
- 1996 - Toshirō Suzue for Kami o kakiageru (髪をかきあげる) and Masataka Matsuda for Umi to Higasa (海と日傘)
- 1997 - Suzuki Matsuo for Funky! Uchū wa mieru tokoro made shika nai (ファンキー!宇宙は見える所までしかない)
- 1998 - Fukatsu Shigefumi for Uchiya matsuri (うちやまつり)
- 1999 - Keralino Sandorovich (KERA) for Frozen Beach (フローズン·ビーチ)
- 2000 - Ai Nagai for Ani kaeru (兄帰る)

=== 2001–2010 ===
- 2001 - Kōki Mitani for Okepi! (オケピ!)
- 2002 - Not awarded
- 2003 - Kazuki Nakashima for Aterui (アテルイ)
- 2004 - Yutaka Kuramochi for One man show (ワンマン·ショー)
- 2005 - Kankurō Kudō for Donjū (鈍獣) and Toshiki Okada for Five Days in March (Sangatsu no itsukakan (三月の5日間)
- 2006 - Norohiko Tsukuda for Nukegara (ぬけがら) and Daisuke Miuara for Ai no uzu (愛の渦)
- 2007 - Not awarded
- 2008 - Shirō Maeda for Ikiteru mono wa inai no ka (生きてるものはいないのか)
- 2009 - Ryuta Horai for Mahoroba (まほろば) and Yukiko Motoya for Shiawase Saiko Arigato maji de (幸せ最高ありがとうマジで!)
- 2010 - Yukio Shiba for Waga Hoshi (わが星)

=== 2010s ===
- 2011 - Shū Matsui for Jiman no musuko (自慢の息子)
- 2012 - Seiji Nozoe for 00 to aru Fukei (○○トアル風景) and Fujita Takahiro for Kaeri no Aizu matteta Shokutaku soko Kito shiofuru sekai (かえりの合図,まってた食卓,そこ,きっと,しおふる世界) and Mikuni Yanaihana for Maemuki! Taimon (前向き!タイモン)
- 2013 - Masaaki Akahori for Itchōmei zomeki (一丁目ぞめき) and Hideto Iwai for Aru onna (ある女)
- 2014 - Ameya Norimizu for Blue Sheet (ブルーシート)
- 2015 - Kenji Yamauchi for Troisgros (トロワグロ)
- 2016 - Kuro Tanino for The Dark Inn (地獄谷温泉 無明ノ宿)
- 2017 - Makoto Ueda for This New World that Had to Come (来てけつかるべき新世界)
- 2018 - Kamisato Yūdai for Valparaiso no nagai saka o kudaru hanashi (バルパライソの長い坂をくだる話) and Fukuhara Mitsunori for Atarashii explosion (あたらしいエクスプロージョン)
- 2019 - Shuntaro Matsubara for "Yamayama" (I Would Prefer Not To)
- 2020 - Satoko Ichihara for "The Bacchae – Holstein Milk Cows"; and Kenichi Tani for "Fukushima Trilogy"
