= Yōji Sakate =

Japanese playwright

Yōji Sakate 坂手洋二
- Born: March 11, 1962 (age 64); Okayama, Japan
- Education: Keiō University
- Occupations: Playwright, director, company founder
- Writing career
- Notable awards: Fifteenth Kinokuniya Drama Award (1990); Kishida Prize for Drama (1991); Tsuruya Nanboku Drama Award (2005)
- Website: Official Blog; Rinkōgun Official Website

Yōji Sakate (坂手 洋二, Sakate Yōji; born March 11, 1962) is a contemporary Japanese playwright notable for his plays that frequently comment on social and political issues in Japan. His most prominent plays are The Attic (屋根裏 Yaneura, 2002), Come Out (カムアウト Kamu auto, 1989), Tokyo Trial (トーキョー裁判 Tōkyō saiban, 1988), and Epitaph for the Whales (くじらの墓標 Kujira no bohyō, 1993). In his works, he focuses on dramatizing real-life events, and also depicts the historical past. In 1983, he founded his own theater company called the Phosphorescence Troupe (燐光群 Rinkōgun). Sakate is currently the president of the Japanese Playwrights Association, and the director of both the Japan Directors Association and Japanese Center of International Theater Institute.

== Biography ==
Sakate was born in Okayama, Japan, in 1962. He studied Japanese literature at Keiō University in Tokyo. During his time at Keiō University, he was inspired and learned from Tetsu Yamazaki, a second wave playwright, to utilize theater as a method to confront contemporary issues in society. He later joined Yamazaki’s theater company called Transposition 21.

=== Historical events ===
The 1980s in Japan was a time of economic growth and prosperity. Japanese arts and culture had also expanded to more modern forms of media such as television broadcasts, magazines, manga, and anime. Japanese theater in the 1980s was characterized by playwrights focusing more on the idea of “little theater.” Foundations like the Japan Arts Fund have helped to create more funding and promote Japanese theater on an international level. In the 1990s, a time period also known as the Lost Decade, the economic prosperity Japan had experienced came to a halt when Japan’s bubble economy collapsed. This period was characterized by a number of economic issues, an aging population, high unemployment rates, and lack of stable lifetime careers. These events translate into Sakate’s works through his criticisms of society’s issues.

Sakate directly discusses specific controversial and historical events of this era in his plays, such as the occupation of Okinawa by the United States in the aftermath of World War II in The Last of the Okinawa Milk Plant (沖縄ミルクプラントの最后 Okinawa miruku puranto no saigo, 1998), the 1995 Subway Sarin Incident in Breathless, and the March 11, 2011 Great East Japan earthquake in some of his latest plays Dropping By the House and A Problem of Blood.

== Career ==
=== Phosphorescence Troupe (燐光群 Rinkōgun) ===
Drawing influence from Yamazaki and fellow playwright Hirata Oriza, he created his own theater company Phosphorescence Troupe (燐光群 Rinkōgun) in 1983. Along with his plays that reveal commentary on Japanese society, he was also active in the radical angura movement that flourished in the 1960s. The Phosphorescence Troupe focuses on performing mostly Sakate’s works and plays, and they have been met with positive reviews from outside Japan.

In 2007, The Attic made its first American premiere in Manhattan, New York. In The New York Times, editor Ginia Bellafante describes Sakate’s language usage in the play as “economical [and] poignant”. In this play, Sakate focuses on the social phenomenon in Japan known as hikikomori, where young adults withdraw from society and isolate themselves typically in their homes. For the company’s 30th anniversary, the Phosphorescence Troupe presented four of Sakate’s original plays: Honchos’ Meeting in Cowra (カウラの班長会議 Kaura no hanchō kaigi, 2013), Return Home (帰還 Kikan), The Attic (屋根裏 Yaneura, 2002), and his newest play, There Was A Cinema Here (ここには映画館があった Koko ni wa eigakan ga atta, 2013).

=== Influences ===
Yamazaki’s work in Transposition 21 heavily influenced Sakate’s theater work, as it was the first kind of theater he had encountered. Inspired from his time in the theater company, he established his own company on this principle. By using real live and historical events as a basis for his plays, they are able to concentrate on political and social commentary going on in modern Japan. Sakate was also influenced by Yamazaki’s journalistic style of writing social criticism by dramatizing contemporary events. The commentary and criticism made within his plays is not solely his view on these incidents, but instead they are a shared opinion of the troupe. The topics that his plays directly addresses are usually taboo or controversial topics within society.

Other figures that significantly impacted the style of Sakate’s works were European playwrights Anton Chekhov and Henrik Ibsen. Sakate has adapted and translated several of Chekhov's works into the nō style, thus creating his contemporary nō series. In 2010, these adapted plays were collected into The Contemporary Nō Collection (現代能楽集 Gendai nōgakushū). Although Chekhov and Ibsen were not part of the nō style, Sakate took these works and created them to fit the general view of nō and also making unique adaptations to create his own style. Plays of Chekhov he translated include The Seagull, Uncle Vanya, The Cherry Orchard, and Three Sisters.

== Themes ==
Through his plays, Sakate challenges a plethora of contemporary issues such as social and political issues, censorship, and sexuality. In Epitaph for the Whales (くじらの墓標 Kujira no bohyō, 1993), he presents the issues related to the 1988 whaling ban and the reactions against it. This play is an example of a “dream play”, and is also the start of a series known as “contemporary nō”, in which the play takes place in a dream. The Attic (屋根裏 Yaneura, 2002) is an example of the lives that take place amongst those with antisocial syndromes. He also satirizes Japan’s legal system in response to the bombing of a Korean Airlines plane in Tokyo Trial (トーキョー裁判 Tōkyō saiban, 1988), and explores female sexuality in Come Out (カムアウト Kamu auto, 1989). Social criticism is the focus in The Last of the Okinawa Milk Plant (沖縄ミルクプラントの最后 Okinawa miruku puranto no saigo, 1998) in where he writes about the problems related to the US military in Okinawa in the aftermath World War II. In his newest work, There Was A Cinema Here (ここには映画館があった Koko ni wa eigakan ga atta, 2013), he presents criticism of the lack of nostalgia in society by reminiscing about the times in Japan where movie theaters were the center of entertainment and life. Not only are his plays harsh criticisms of the modern society, they also present questions about the nature of theater itself. Other playwrights at the time, like Ai Nagai, offered a different approach to these issues. They often wrote in a more comical way to satirize societal issues.

If we are to confront such circular patterning, we must make theater an indisputable “coming-out”. An individual, by coming out, can liberate himself from his own internalized social system and give birth to a new self. Such a process seems analogous to what a theatrical vision requires in order for a play to be even minimally dramatic.

— Yōji Sakate, (Japan Playwrights Association, 16)

In light of the 1st anniversary of the March 11, 2011 Great East Japan earthquake, Sakate and several other prominent Japanese and American playwrights collaborated in Shinsai: Theaters for Japan. This event took play in New York City at the Segal Theater and included other notable playwrights such as Hirata Oriza, Okada Toshiki, and Nen Ishihara. Sakate’s contributed plays, Dropping By the House and A Problem of Blood, dealt with several issues related to the disaster such as the fear of radiation, generational differences, and the effort to create a sense of everyday life in the midst of disaster. The funds raised from the plays were directly allocated to theater companies in Japan affected by the disaster. The triple disaster in 2011, which consisted of an earthquake, tsunami, and nuclear meltdown, took the lives of over 18,000 people and thousands missing, injured, or displaced from their homes.

== Awards and nominations ==
As a playwright, he has been awarded several accolades such as the Fifteenth Kinokuniya Drama Award in 1990 and the Kishida Prize for Drama in 1991 for Breathless (ブレスレス Buresuresu, 1990). This play focuses on the issue of Tokyo’s garbage disposal problem and the events of the 1995 Subway Sarin Incident. His works have also been published and translated in over 10 languages.

- Kishida Prize for Drama (1991)
  - Breathless (ブレスレス Buresuresu, 1990)
- Tsuruya Nanboku Drama Award
  - Won: DA-RU-MA-SA-N-GA-KO-RO-N-DA (だるまさんがころんだ Daruma san ga koronda, 2004) (2005)
  - Nominated for:
    - The Boiling Point of the Sea (海の沸点 Umi no futten, 1997) (1998)
    - The Emperor and The Kiss (天皇と接吻 Ten'nō to seppun, 1999) (2000)
    - Pikadon Kijimunā (ピカドン・キジムナー Pikadon kijimunaa, 1997) (2002)
    - The Attic (屋根裏 Yaneura, 2002) (2003)
- Yomiuri Prize for Literature
- Yomiuri Prize for Theater
  - Best Director Awards:
    - The Emperor and The Kiss (天皇と接吻 Ten'nō to seppun, 1999) (2000)
    - The Attic (屋根裏 Yaneura, 2002) (2003)
    - DA-RU-MA-SA-N-GA-KO-RO-N-DA (だるまさんがころんだ Daruma san ga koronda, 2004) (2005)
- Fifteenth Kinokuniya Drama Award (1990)
- Asahi Performing Arts Award

== Notable works ==
- Come Out (カムアウト Kamu auto, 1989)
- Tokyo Trial (トーキョー裁判 Tōkyō saiban, 1988)
- A Dangerous Story (危険な話 Kiken na hanashi, 1988)
- Breathless (ブレスレス Buresuresu, 1990)
- Epitaph of the Whales (くじらの墓標 Kujira no bohyō, 1993)
- The Capital of the Kingdom of the Gods (神々の国の首都 Kamigami no kuni no shuto, 1993)
- The Origin of the Fire (火の起源 Hi no kigen, 1994)
- Sōseki and Hearn (漱石とヘルン Sōseki to Herun, 1997)
- The Boiling Point of the Sea (海の沸点 Umi no futten, 1997)
- Pikadon Kijimunā (ピカドン・キジムナー Pikadon kijimunā, 1997)
- The Last of the Okinawa Milk Plant (沖縄ミルクプラントの最后 Okinawa miruku puranto no saigo, 1998)
- The Emperor and The Kiss (天皇と接吻 Ten'nō to seppun, 1999)
- The Attic (屋根裏 Yaneura, 2002)
- DA-RU-MA-SA-N-GA-KO-RO-N-DA (だるまさんがころんだ Daruma san ga koronda, 2004)
- Dropping by the House (2012)
- A Problem of Blood (2012)

=== Notable productions by Phosphorescence Troupe ===
- 1983-1990
  - The Yellow Dog - The Flaming Flag (黄色犬 紅蓮旗篇 Oushoku inu gurenbata hen, 1983)
  - Execution Airport (処刑空港 Shokei kūkō, 1983)
  - Wild Rumors in Orleans (オルレアンのうわさ Orurean no uwasa, 1984)
  - Nutria's Battle (ヌートリアズバトル Nūtoriazu batoru, 1985)
  - Jail of the Butterflies (蝶たちの獄 Chōtachi no goku, 1985)
  - Beyond Tokyo (ビヨンド･トーキョー Biyondo Tōkyō, 1986)
  - Dead Zone (デッド･ゾーン Deddo zōn, 1986)
  - Three Women (三人の女 Sannin no onna, 1987)
  - The Tokyo Trial (トーキョー裁判 Tōkyō saiban, 1988)
  - A Dangerous Story (危険な話 Kiken na hanashi, 1988)
  - Come Out (カムアウト Kamu auto, 1989)
  - Breathless (Tokyo Garbage Bag) (ブレスレス Buresuresu, 1990)
- 1991-1995
  - Notorious (汚名 Omei, 1991)
  - Picnic Conductor (ピクニック･コンダクタ Pikunikku kondakuta, 1991)
  - Life on a Bargain Sale (ライフ･バーゲン Raifu bāgen, 1991)
  - Epitaph for the Whales (くじらの墓標 Kujira no bohyō, 1993)
  - Contemporary Noh Collection (現代能楽集 Gendai nōgakushū, 1993)
  - Capital City of the Gods (神々の国の首都 Kamigami no kuni no shuto, 1993)
  - The Wife of Kandagawa (神田川の妻 Kandagawa no tsuma, 1994)
- 1996-2000
  - Noctilucae (夜光るもの Yoru hikaru mono, 1996)
  - La Dolce Vita (甘い生活 Amai seikatsu, 1996)
  - Life of a Man (男の一生 Otoko no isshō, 1997)
  - Sōseki and Hearn (漱石とヘルン Sōseki to Herun, 1997)
  - The Last of the Okinawa Milk Plant (沖縄ミルクプラントの最后 Okinawa miruku puranto no saigo, 1998)
  - The Emperor and The Kiss (天皇と接吻 Ten'nō to seppun, 1999)
  - 2.5 Minute Ride (2000)
  - Whalers in the South Seas (南洋くじら部隊 Nanyō kujira butai, 2000)
- 2001-2005
  - The Laramie Project (ララミー・プロジェクト Raramī purojekuto, 2001)
  - MOBY DICK (白鯨 Hakugei, 2001)
  - Once Upon A Time in Kyoto (ワンス・アポン・ア・タイム・イン京都 Wansu apon a taimu in Kyōto, 2002)
  - The Attic (屋根裏 Yaneura, 2002)
  - Until the Last Person Standing (最後の一人までが全体である Saigo no hitori made ga zentai de aru, 2002)
  - ABESADA and MUTSUO (阿部定と睦夫 Abesada to Mutsuo, 2002)
  - The Elephant (象 Zō, 2003)
  - DA-RU-MA-SA-N-GA-KO-RO-N-DA (だるまさんがころんだ Daruma san ga koronda, 2004)
  - The Unperformed Three Sisters (上演されなかった『三人姉妹』Jōen sarenakatta "sannin shimai", 2005)
- 2006-2010
  - Stuff Happens (スタッフ・ハプンズ Sutaffu hapunzu, 2006)
  - Vagabond (さすらい Sasurai, 2006)
  - Checkpoint Sunspot Island (チェックポイント黒点島 Chekkupointo kokutenjima, 2006)
  - WORLD TRADE CENTER (ワールド・トレード・センター Wārudo Torēdo Sentā, 2004)
  - War and Citizen (戦争と市民 Sensō to shimin, 2008)
  - Contemporary Noh Plays "Ibsen" (現代能楽集 イプセン Gendai nōgakushū Ibusen, 2009)
  - Contemporary Noh Collection "Chehov" (現代能楽集 チェーホフ Gendai nōgakushū Chēhofu, 2010)
  - Life of a Woman of Three Minutes (3分間の女の一生 Sanpunkan no onna no isshō, 2010)
- 2011-
  - Ura YANEURA (裏屋根裏 Ura yaneura, 2011)
  - Suishinha (推進派 Suishinha, 2011)
  - Tatta hitori no Sensō (たった一人の戦争 Tatta hitori no sensō, 2011)
  - Hoshi no Musuko (星の息子 Hoshi no musuko, 2012)
  - Dropping by the House (2012)
  - A Problem of Blood (2012)
  - Honchos’ Meeting in Cowra (カウラの班長会議 Kaura no hanchō kaigi, 2013)
  - Return Home (帰還 Kikan, 2013)
  - There Was A Cinema Here (ここには映画館があった Koko ni wa eigakan ga atta, 2013)
  - 8 Minutes (8分間 Happunkan, 2014)
