= Harry Rolnick =

American author, editor and music critic

Harry Rolnick is an American author, editor and music critic. His writing often examines Asian lifestyles and culinary traditions.

Eating Out In China (1979) was the first book to explore People's Republic restaurants. His other restaurant guides, to Hong Kong, Bangkok, and Macau, prompted Alan Levy to write in The Foodie’s Guide to the World, "Nobody eats in Asia without consulting Harry Rolnick first".

Rolnick has written a history of coffee to promote the Melitta brand, a guide to feng shui, and a social history of Macau. He also co-authored The Chinese Gourmet with William Mark.

A native of New York, Rolnick was a Merchant Marine before taking residence in Thailand, where he was one of the first editors of the Bangkok Post and later Hong Kong, from where he traveled throughout Asia and East Africa for two decades.

He has written articles for Lonely Planet, Newsweek, International Herald Tribune, Wall Street Journal, Travel & Leisure, GEO, and many other publications. In 1998, he edited the first English-language lifestyle magazine in Budapest, before returning to Manhattan. Rolnick's most recent book is Spice Chronicles: Exotic Tales of a Hungry Traveler (2008, Seven Locks Press).

Rolnick is also a New York correspondent for ConcertoNet.com, a classical music review site.
