= Hideki Noda (playwright) =

Japanese actor and playwright

Hideki Noda 野田秀樹
- Born: 20 December 1955 (age 70); Saikai, Nagasaki, Japan
- Occupations: Theatre director, actor, dramatist
- Years active: 1976–present

Hideki Noda (野田 秀樹, Noda Hideki; born 20 December 1955) is a Japanese actor, playwright and theatre director who has written and directed more than 40 plays in Japan.

== Biography ==
Noda was born in Nagasaki, Japan. He briefly attended Tokyo University to study law but eventually dropped out. Noda debuted his first play, An Encounter Between Love and Death, during his second year of high school. His second play, The Advent of the Beast, was well received by critics in 1981. This led to his invitation to perform at the Edinburgh International Festival, which he already participated in three years earlier. In 2008 he was also appointed artistic director of Tokyo Metropolitan Art Space in Ikebukuro, and became a professor in the Department of Scenography Design, Drama, and Dance at Tama Art University.

In 2006, Noda Hideki wrote The Bee which is coauthored by Colin Teevan. This play was adapted to theater from Tsutsui Yasutaka's novel Mushiriai (Plucking at Each Other). In 2006, The Bee was first staged in English by Soho Theatre and NODA MAP, and in 2007 in Japan by NODA MAP. He is currently in charge of the Tokyo Metropolitan Theatre, where he works as a director. His plays focus on including celebrities to attract a wider audience rather than experimenting with different forms. Even though he primarily focuses on who he casts to play characters, "he brings in new audiences aplenty and also surreptitiously manages to sneak in satirical themes that only someone with his calibre could."

He became artistic director at the Tokyo Metropolitan Theatre in 2009.

== Style ==
The most notable characteristics of Noda's plays are his use of limericks and word play.

== Works ==
The turning point in Noda's career was in late 1992 while he was living in London. A year later, he founded Noda Map where he worked at kabuki and opera and produced his own plays. Noda's plays have moved beyond the child's dream world to social issues such as nationalism, colonialism, sexuality and crime. The major full-length works are Kill (Kiru, 1994) and Pandora's Bell (Pandora no kane, 1999).

== Plays ==
Noda has been collaborating with the playwright Colin Teevan and the actress Kathryn Hunter, producing English versions of The Bee (2006) and The Diver (2008) in London. He was also a member of the cast for these productions. The Japanese version of The Diver was performed in Tokyo in 2009 with Shinobu Otake.

Yume no Yuminsha garnered enough popular reception to be invited to the Edinburgh international Theatre Festival in 1987 with Nokemono Kitarite, and in 1990 with Hanshin: Half-God. Also in 1990, the company was invited to the first New York International Art Festival to perform Suisei no Siegfried (A Messenger from the Comet). Noda was getting more involved in working with other dramatists and actors outside of Yume no Yuminsha; which led to acclaimed stagings of his radical takes on Shakespeare's Twelfth Night, Much Ado About Nothing and A Midsummer Night’s Dream. Both were collaborated with Toho, one of the Japan's leading production companies.

== Noda Map ==
Noda Map works
Noda Map #	Name	Period	Ref
1	Kill	1994/01/07 - 1994/03/13	
2	Gansaku tsumitobachi	1995/04/01 - 1995/06/11	
3	Taboo	1996/04/04 - 1996/05/26	
4	Kill (1997)	1997/07/03 - 1997/08/31	
5	Rolling Stone	1998/04/04 - 1998/05/13	
6	Hanshin	1999/04/02 - 1999/05/16	
7	Pandora's bell	1999/11/06 - 1999/12/26	
8	Canon	2000/04/01 - 2000/05/28	
9	Oil	2003/04/11 - 2003/06/15	
10	Hashire Merus	2004/12/03 - 2005/01/30	
11	Gansaku tsumitobachi (2005)	2005/12/06 - 2006/02/18	
12	Rope	2006/12/05 - 2007/01/31	
13	Kill (2007)	2007/12/07 - 2008/01/31	
14	Piper	2009/01/04 - 2009/02/28	
15	The Character	2010/06/20 - 2010/08/08	
16	To the south	2011/02/10 - 2011/03/31	
17	Egg	2012/09/05 - 2012/10/28	
18	Miwa	2013/10/04 - 2013/12/08	
19	Egg (2015)	2015/02/03 - 2015/04/19	
20	Gekirin	2016/01/29 - 2016/04/04	
21	Ashiato hime ~ jidai sakugo fuyu yūrei ~ (Footprint Princess)	2017/01/18 ~ 2017/03/12	
22	Gansaku sakura no mori no mankai no shita (In the forest, under cherries in full bloom)	2018/09/01 ~ 2018/11/25	
23	Q: A Night At The Kabuki	2019/10/08 ~ 2019/12/11	
24	Fakespeare	2021/05/24 ~ 2021/07/25	
25	Q: A Night At The Kabuki (2022)	2022/07/29 ~ 2022/10/30	
26	Usagi, Nami wo hashiru (Rabbit Runs on the Waves)	2023/06/17 ~ 2023/08/27	
27	Sei sankaku kankei (Love In Action)	2024/07/11 ~ 2024/10/10	
28	Kashi minus 320 ° (Minus 320 Degrees Fahrenheit)	2026/04/10 ~ 2026/08/02	

== Awards and honors ==
- 1983 – The 27th Kunio Kishida Drama Award for Nokemono Kitarite (野獣降臨（のけものきたりて）)
- 1985 – Kinokuniya Drama Award: Individual Awards
- 1990 – Arts Festival Award of Agency for Cultural Affairs for Sandaime, Richard (三代目、りちゃあど)
- 1994 – The 19th Teatoru Drama Award
- 1998 – The 23rd Kazuo Kikuta Drama Award for the direction of Kill (キル)
- 1999 – The 2nd Nanboku Tsuruya Drama Award for Right Eye
- 2000 – The 34th Kunio Kishida Drama Award (Individual Award) and the 50th Minister of Education Award for the direction of Pandora no Kane (パンドラの鐘, The Bell of Pandora)
- 2001 – The 1st Asahi Performing arts Award Grand Prix for Noda-ban Toghi-Tatsu no Utare (野田版 研辰の討たれ)
- 2007 – The 58th Yomiuri Prize for Rope (ロープ)
- 2009 - the Asahi Prize
- 2009 - Honorary Officer of the British Empire (OBE)
- 2011 - the Medal with Purple Ribbon for his contributions to education and culture
- 2023 - Distinguished Artist Award by International Society for the Performing Arts
- 2025 - Person of Cultural Merit

== See also ==
- Ai Nagai Japanese playwright, stage director, co-founder and leader of Nitosha
- Toshiki Okada Japanese playwright, theater director, novelist, founder of Chelfitsch
- Kunio Shimizu Japanese playwright
