= Oriza Hirata =

Japanese writer and director

Oriza Hirata 平田オリザ
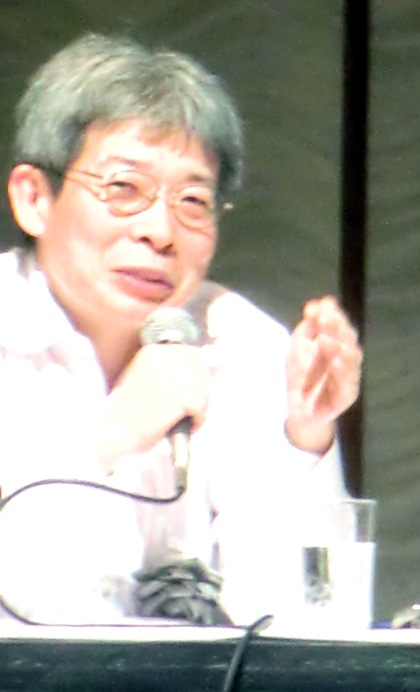
- in Tokyo (September, 2013)
- Born: November 8, 1962 (age 63); Tokyo, Japan
- Occupations: Playwright, director, academic
- Years active: 1989-present
- Known for: Tōkyō Notes, Citizens of Seoul
- Website: www.seinendan.org/eng/oriza/

Oriza Hirata (平田オリザ, Hirata Oriza; born on 8 November 1962, in Tokyo) is a Japanese playwright, director, and academic. For the majority of his life, he has been best known for his work in theater and creating what he has coined, “contemporary colloquial theater,” or as theater critics call it, “quiet drama.”

== Career ==
Oriza Hirata graduated from International Christian University as a part of their Humanities division. In 1983, he formed the Seinendan Theater Company, which he established in order to practice contemporary colloquial theater. In 1984, Seinendan settled into using the Komaba Agora Theater as their main base of operations. Hirata remains as the theater's primary artistic director and has continued to play a major role in the theater's management.

Hirata's first play, Citizens of Seoul (ソウル市民, Seoul shimin), first premiered in 1989, and has remained one of his most famous plays. 6 Years later, in 1994, he debuted Tōkyō Notes (東京ノート, Tōkyō nōto), which is still considered his magnum opus. As a playwright, Hirata has continued to write and direct plays both at Komaba Agora theater, as well as theaters in Europe, the Americas, and other parts of Asia. He is also known for doing international collaborations both in Japan and all around the world, where he has worked with a multitude of playwrights and artists to introduce his own work to new audiences, as well as introduce foreign work to Japan.

Hirata worked at Obirin University for six years as a professor in their theater department before moving onto Osaka University, where he works in their communication-design and robotics departments.

== Contemporary colloquial theater ==
Contemporary colloquial theater is a theatrical style Oriza Hirata founded as an answer to the “boisterous and festive nature of 1980s Japanese theater.” This style emphasizes colloquial Japanese language use that is designed to sound distinctly typical of the linguistic tendencies and patterns of everyday Japanese speaking. As a result, his plays oftentimes feature multiple characters talking at once, sentence fragments, inaudible speech, and an understated, "normal" speaking tone. This style informs his plays stylistically, both in language and plot, in the sense that Hirata emphasizes realism throughout. However, Hirata has preferred his own stylistic title of "contemporary colloquial theater" because he thinks that relatable terms like Shingeki or realism "sounded too much like the Western drama that [they] emulated." Hirata's style is partially due to his identification the impact of Western style was having on Japanese arts. As a reaction, he has sought to create an artistic style more representative of typical Japanese language and culture. As a playwright, he founded the Seinendan theater company in 1983 as a way to push his acting style into the greater Japanese and international theatre scenes. Hirata has worked closely with international actors when translating his work to preserve the Japanese identity of the speech, which has particularly resonated with French audiences. This style also tends to emphasize a small, intimate set of characters—usually represented by the actors playing the role of a family—to serve as a “microcosm of Japanese society as a whole.” Japanese theater scholar, M. Cody Poulton, describes Hirata's style as an emphasis of the Greek idea of ethos, "the prevalent tone of sentiment of a people or community; the genius of an institution or system."

== Interdisciplinary work ==
After working at Obirin University as a theater professor, Oriza Hirata moved to work for Osaka University, where he collaborated in the scientific fields of communication-design and robotics.

Hirata has participated in designing university classes that emphasize the communication environment for different fields in order for them to perform more successfully.

There are design elements and organizational elements that can encourage better communication in the doctor’s office, such as the positions of the doctor’s and the patient’s chairs, the color of the walls, the lighting, and these elements can create an environment that encourages the patient to ask the doctor questions and bring out answers that can reduce medical/diagnostic error.

— Hirata Oriza,

For robotics, Hirata used his theater experience to attempt to make robots that act similarly to humans. While his work has been used to generally fulfill this role, he has also brought his work in robotics back to the theater, where he has incorporated robots in plays to explore themes of humanity. His play, I, Worker uses two robots as main characters to explore this very idea. He has collaborated with robotics expert Hiroshi Ishiguro for his theatrical experiments using robots.

== International work and acclaim ==
Shortly after beginning his career as a playwright, Oriza Hirata has had a successful international career—both touring his work around the world, as well as staging foreign playwrights work at his own theater in Japan.

Beginning in the early 2000s, Hirata's work started to garner international attention. With the help of Japan's Saison Foundation, a grant-making foundation that supports Japanese Theater, and Manhattan's Nonprofit organization Japan Society, Hirata's most famous work, Tōkyō Notes was debuted in the United States in October 2000 in New York City. Japan Society's theater series, Japanese Theatre NOW, has helped bring a number of contemporary Japanese dramas to the United States, Hirata's being notable since Tōkyō Notes was one of the first.

Since then, Hirata's work and company have traveled much of the world, including France, Belgium, Switzerland, Ireland, Germany, the United Kingdom, Korea, China, Australia, and Brazil. Hirata says that he believes he has "done the best work in France," where "the people in France have been very enthusiastic about [his] work." Both in France and Belgium, Hirata has collaborated with international actors and directors to bring his theatrical work to an international audience, as well as creating new commissioned work as both a playwright and director.

Hirata has also collaborated on many international works inside of Japan, using his theater to stage plays by playwrights from France, Switzerland, Italy, Spain, the United States, Korea, and China. Hirata's admiration for the French theater scene can be seen with these collaborations as well, as he has tended to stage more French plays than any other country he has collaborated with.

A year after the Fukushima Daiichi nuclear disaster, Hirata submitted a 10-minute play, along with 18 other American and Japanese artist, to be performed and documented in an event called Shinsai: Theaters For Japan. The event happened that the Great Hall at Cooper Union in New York City. Hirata's play, entitled "Sayonara II", tells the story of a partially-broken robot who is asked to read poems to the people who died after the disaster.

== Accolades ==
- 39th Kishida Prize for Drama for his play Tōkyō Notes (1995).
- 5th Yomiuru Theater Outstanding Director Award for producing Masataka Matsuda's play The Cape of the Moon (1998).
- 9th Yomiuri Theater Award for Outstanding Production on his play Attacking Ueno Zoo for the Fourth Time (2002).
- Association Internationale des Critiques des Théâtre Critique Award for his book Arts as the Basis of a Nation (2002).
- Winner of the Grand Prix of the 2nd Asahi Performing Arts Awards for his play Across the River in May (2003).
- Montblanc de la Culture Arts Patronage Award (2006).

== List of works ==
=== Major works ===
- 1989: Citizens of Seoul (ソウル市民, Seoul shimin): One of Hirata's earliest and most critically acclaimed works, Citizens of Seoul tackles Japan's superiority complex over Korea during their colonization.
- 1994: Tōkyō Notes (東京ノート, Tōkyō nōto): Hirata's most famous and praised work around the world, Tōkyō Notes takes place in a museum where a number of people's personal lives are examined in order to gain a fuller picture of the political, social, and cultural context of a near-future Japan.
- 2002: The Yalta Conference (ヤルタ会談, Yaruta kaidan): Summarizing the world's history post-WWII, this is one of Hiraza's most grand dramas in terms of scope. Winston Churchill, Franklin D. Roosevelt, and Joseph Stalin are the only 3 characters in the play.

=== Recent works ===
- 2009: Par-dessus bord -Tori no tobu takasa (鳥の飛ぶ高さ, Tori no tubu takasa)
- 2009: The Tongue-Cut Sparrow (舌切り雀, Shitakiri Suzume)
- 2009: Christmas in Tehran (クリスマス イン テヘラン, Kurisumasu in Teheran)
- 2008: I, Worker (働く私, Hataraku Watashi)
- 2008: A Long Night in the Tropics (眠れない夜なんてない, Nemurenai Yorunante nai)
- 2008: A Cold Wind Blows through Cherry Blossoms (風のつめたき櫻かな, Kaze no Tsumetaki Sakura kana)
- 2008: In the Heart of a Forest (森の奥, Mori no Oku)
- 2007: Citizens of Seoul 1929: Graffiti (ソウル市民 昭和望郷編, Seoul Shimin Shōwa Bōkyō Hen)
- 2007: Songs of Farewell (別れの唄, Wakare no Uta)

=== Other notable works ===
- 2005: Sand and Soldiers (砂と兵隊, Sunato Heitai)
- 2005: Conference before the Throne (御前会議, Gozen Kaigi)
- 2003: No More Winds Blow (もう風も吹かない, Mō Kazemo Fukanai)
- 2003: The Journal of POWs (南島俘虜記, Nantō Furyoki)
- 2002: Across the River in May (その河をこえて、五月, Sono Kawa o Koete, Gogatsu)
- 2001: Attacking the Ueno Zoo for the Fourth Time (上野動物園再々々襲撃, Ueno Dōbutsuen sai-sai-sai Shūgeki)
- 2000: Suddenly Married (隣にいても一人, Tonari ni Itemo Hitori)
- 2000: Citizens of Seoul 1919 (ソウル市民1919, Seoul Shimin 1919)
- 1999: People of the Far Away Days (遠い日々の人, Tooi Hibi no Hito)
- 1999: The Night Longer than the Sea (海よりも長い夜, Umi yorimo Nagai Yoru)
- 1999: The Treasury of Loyal Retainers (忠臣蔵, Chūshingura)
- 1999: A Couple's Story (夫婦善哉, Meoto Zenai)
- 1998: Komachi's Tale - New Version (新版・小町風伝, Shinpan Komachifūden)
- 1997: Revolutionists (革命日記, Kakumei Nikki)
- 1997: Cause the Moon is So Bright Tonight (月がとっても蒼いから, Tsuki ga Tottemo Aoikara)
- 1997: The Little Match Girls (マッチ売りの少女たち, Matchi Uri no Shōjotachi)
- 1997: The Balkan Zoo (バルカン動物園, Balkan Dōbutsuen)
- 1996: The Dancer (踊り子, Odoriko)
- 1996: Kings of the Road (冒険王, Bōken Ō)
- 1996: A Hard Life to Accept (この生は受け入れがたし, Kono Sei wa Ukeiregathashi)
- 1995: A Burning House, or Shambles? (火宅か修羅か, Kataku ka Shura ka)
- 1994: Transfer Student (転校生, Tenkōsei)
- 1994: Some Forgotten Dream (思い出せない夢のいくつか, Omoidasenai Yume no Ikutsuka)
- 1992: Northernmost Monkeys (北限の猿, Hokugen no Saru)
- 1992: Run in Your Sleep (走りながら眠れ, Hashirinagara Nemure)
- 1992: Isn't Life More than Goodbyes? (さよならだけが人生か, Sayonara dakega Jinsei ka)
- 1992: My Days of Mah-jong (麻雀放浪記, Mājyan Hōrōki)
- 1991: From S Plateau (Ｓ高原から, S Kōgen Kara)
- 1991: Travel on Train (阿房列車, Ahō Ressha)
- 1991: Confession of a Feeble Mind (暗愚小傳, Angu Shoden)
- 1990: Southward (南へ, Minami e)
- 1990: The Scientifically Minded (カガクするココロ, Kagakusuru Kokoro)
