= Unterm Radar =

- Written by: Henriette Buegger
- Screenplay by: Dagmar Zeisberg
- Directed by: Elmar Fischer
- Starring: Christiane Paul; Heino Ferch
- Music by: Matthias Beine
- Country of origin: Germany
- Original language: German

Production
- Producers: Fritjof Hohagen; Nicole Swidler
- Cinematography: Sten Mende
- Editor: Eva López Echegoyen
- Running time: 90 minutes
- Production companies: Enigma Film; WDR

Original release
- Release: 17 September 2015

Unterm Radar is a 2015 German television film directed by Elmar Fischer.

== Plot ==
The orderly world of German judge Elke Seeberg goes completely out of joint when a terrorist bomb explodes in a Berlin bus and the federal police comes bursting through her door: Allegedly her teenage daughter played a part in the attack and is now on the run. What follows is a kafkaesque nightmare.

== Cast ==
- Christiane Paul ... Elke Seeberg
- Heino Ferch ... Heinrich Buch
- Fabian Hinrichs ... Richard König
- Inka Friedrich ... Anna Bittner
- Matthias Matschke ... Tom Henskind
- Hans Werner Meyer ... Ferdinand Hochheim
- Linn Reusse ... Marie Seeberg (as Linn Sara Reusse)
- Lara Mandoki ... Nina
- Nursel Köse ... Amira
- Mirko Lang ... Johannes

== Awards ==
Year	Award	Category	Nominated	Result
2016	44th International Emmy Awards	Best Performance by an Actress	Christiane Paul	Won
