= Jacqueline Macaulay =

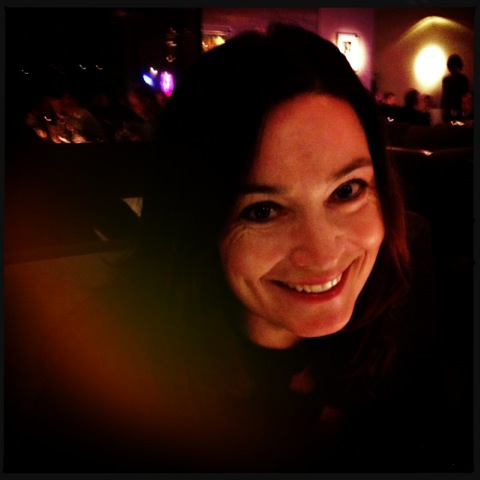
Jacqueline Macaulay 2012

Jacqueline Macaulay (born 24 April 1967) is an English actress who mainly works in Germany.

== Life and career ==
Jacqueline Macaulay was born in Doncaster, England, to a Scottish father, an army officer, and a Hungarian mother. She grew up in England (until 1973) and the Netherlands (1973–1986), where she graduated in 1985. In 1986, she moved to Germany to study at the State University of Music and Performing Arts in Stuttgart (1987–1990).

Later she had engagements at the (Theater Bonn), (Schauspielhaus Zürich) as well as in Luxembourg and Berlin, until she became a staff member of the Maxim-Gorki-Theater in Berlin in 1998 and stayed there until 2006. For her interpretation of Luise Miller in Schiller's Kabale und Liebe (Intrigue and Love), directed by András Fricsay (Bonn, 1994) she was awarded a prize as most talented new actress in North Rhine-Westphalia.

The following year she won the vote for most talented new actress in Germany in a critics' poll of the magazine Theater Heute for her double role as Carol and Klara in Oleanna/ Music directed by Harald Clemen (Bonn). With Arthur Miller's Der große Knall (originally:The great depression), directed by David Mouchtar-Samorai, she was invited to the Berlin Theater Meeting and received the award "Ensemblepreis" in NRW.

While she acted in supporting roles in films and on TV she has frequently portrayed main characters on the theatre stage.

Jacqueline Macaulay is married to the German actor Hans Werner Meyer.

== Filmography and theatre credits ==
=== Select filmography ===
- 1995: Zwei Brüder (TV)
- 1998–2003: Die Cleveren (TV) (irregular appearances)
- 1999: Und morgen geht die Sonne wieder auf
- 2000: Der König vom Block
- 2003–2004: Die Albertis (TV)
- 2005: Typisch Sophie
- 2006: Früher oder später (TV)
- 2008: The Reader
- 2009: Meine Familie bringt mich um (TV)
- 2010: Ameisen gehen andere Wege

=== Theatre credits ===
- 1990: Die Räuber (Luzern)
- 1993: Der Pelikan (Bonn)
- 1994: Kabale und Liebe (Bonn)
- 1996: Emilia Galotti (Bonn)
- 1996: Der große Knall (Bonn)
- 1997: Ein Traumspiel (Luxembourg)
- 1997: Maß für Maß (Measure for measure) (Deutsches Theater, Berlin)
- 1998: Väter und Söhne (Maxim Gorki Theater, Berlin)
- 2002: Romeo und Julia (Romeo and Juliet) (Maxim Gorki Theater, Berlin)
- 2004: Dreigroschenoper (The Threepenny Opera) (Maxim Gorki Theater, Berlin)
- 2005: Die glückliche Reise (Maxim Gorki Theater, Berlin)
- 2007: Quato Tasso Theater Ruhrfestspiele, Recklinghausen
- 2009: Dantons Tod Hans Otto Theater, Potsdam)
- 2010-2012: Frau Müller muss weg (Staatsschauspiel Dresden)
- 2011: Der Aufstand (Theater Ruhrfestspiele, Recklinghausen)

== Awards ==
- 1994: most talented new actress in NRW
- 1995: most talented new actress in Germany ("Theater Heute" critics' poll)
