= Justizpalast (Munich) =

Judicial complex in Munich, Germany

Coordinates: 48°8′26″N 11°33′53″E

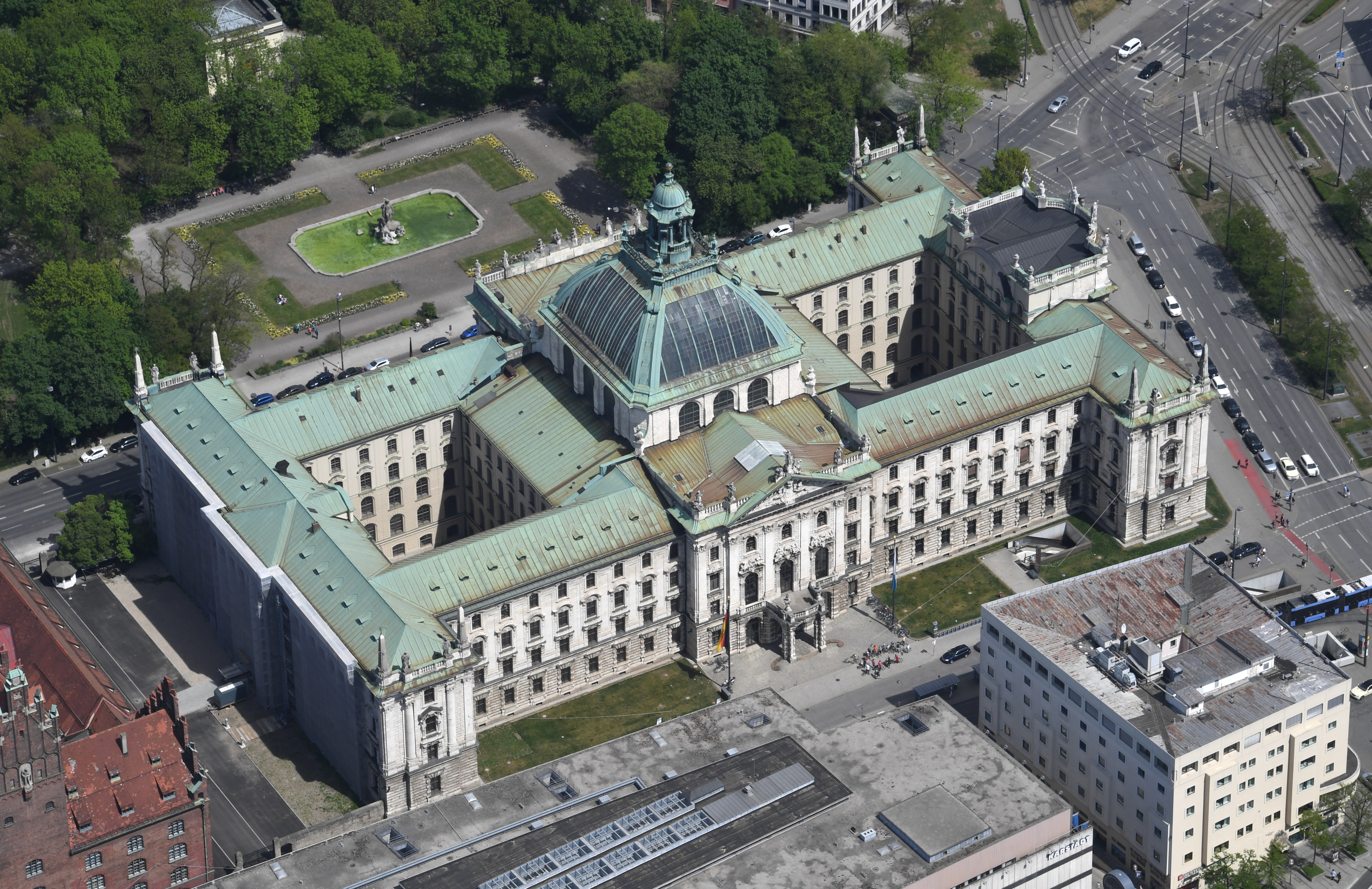
Aerial image of the Justizpalast Munich

The Justizpalast Munich (Palace of Justice) are two courthouses and administrative buildings in Munich, Bavaria, Germany.

== Buildings ==
=== Justizpalast ===
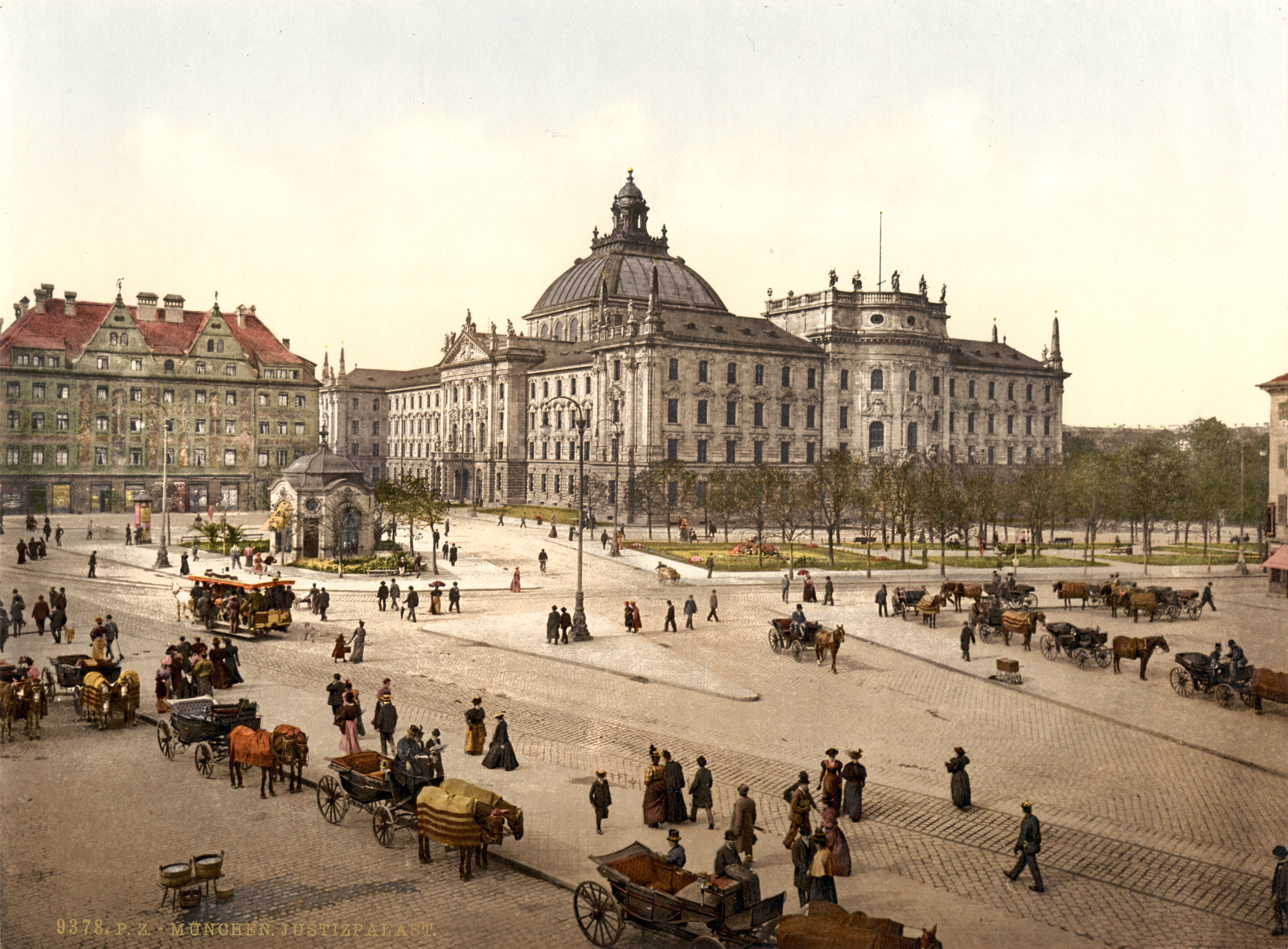
Postcard from the late 19th century

The palatial (old) Palace of Justice was constructed in 1890–97 by the architect Friedrich von Thiersch in Neo-Baroque style at the west side of the Karlsplatz (Stachus). The building of the Gründerzeit is dominated by a central glass dome (67 meters). The building is 138 meters long and 80 meters deep. The center of the building, which was designed around two courtyards, is the central hall measuring 19 m x 29 m.

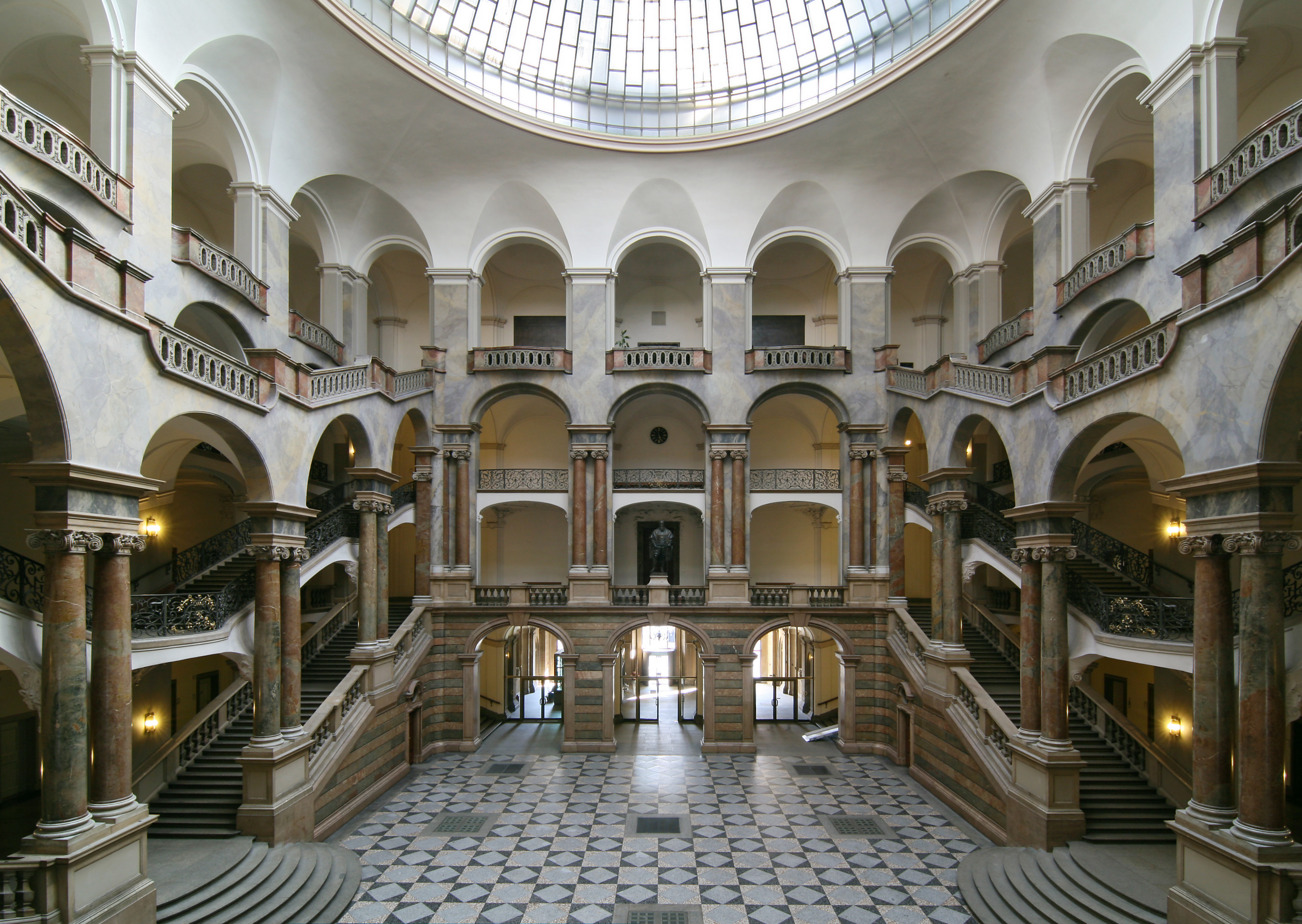
Justizpalast, areaway and staircase

The four façades of the free-standing building are of varying proportions, but they have similarities with the granite base as a substructure and the colossal arrangement of pilasters or columns on the central structure and the corners. The three upper floors are surrounded by window frames and gables, the second floor being emphasized the most. On the northern façade, the east and west wings are projected as a corner avant-corps and the central section. Six columns with Corinthian capitals here form the upper floor. The longitudinal fronts and corner protrusions of the southern façade are similar to those of the northern façade, but the middle avant-corps is less prominent and is divided by pilasters. On the ground floor there is an open porch, which once served as an underpass for carriages. On the first floor, the front porch serves as a balcony. The three central axes of the avant-corps are crowned by a gable with the Bavarian coat of arms. On the pediment stands the statue of Justitia, flanked by Innocence and Vice. The east facade is strongly marked by the central avant-corps with a convex front and obelisks at all four corner points.

The Justizpalast houses the Bavarian Department of Justice and the District Court I of Munich.

The People's Court sentenced the members of the White Rose in the Justizpalast in 1943. The "White Rose Hall" in the building is today a memorial place. In 1962 Vera Brühne and in 2014 Uli Hoeneß were convicted in the Justizpalast.

=== New Justizpalast ===
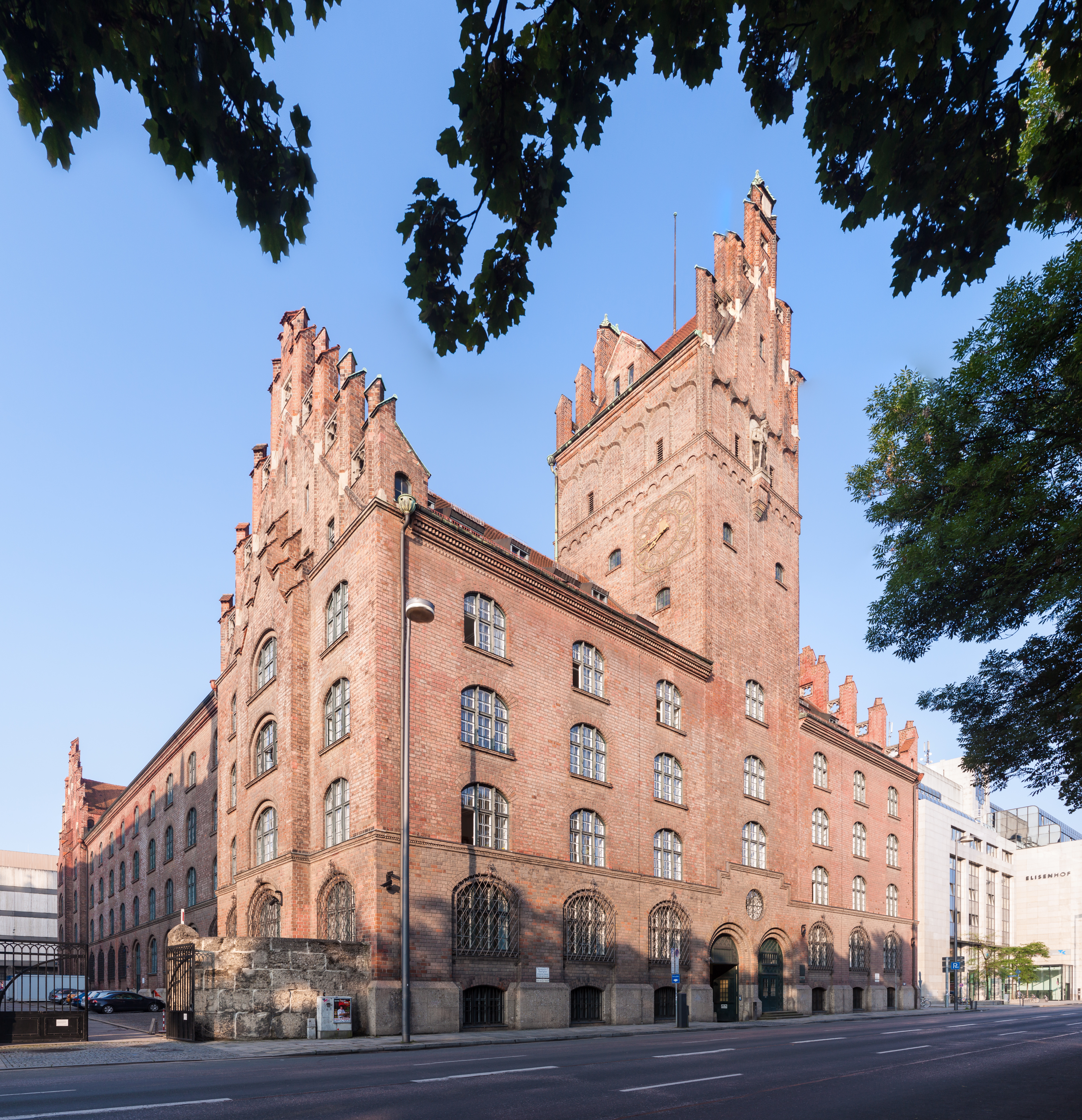
New Justizpalast Munich

Since the huge building turned out to be too small Friedrich von Thiersch constructed already in 1905 at the west side of the building the so-called New Justizpalast. This time he created the courthouse in strong contrast to the Justizpalast in red brick stone in northern Brick Gothic style with two towers. The New Justice Building was once decorated with facade murals, now gone. The end facades are marked by high stepped gables and central dock towers on each of the sides are flanked by similar gables.

The New Justizpalast houses the Bavarian Constitutional Court and the Higher Regional Court.
