= Heiner Lauterbach =

German actor (born 1953)

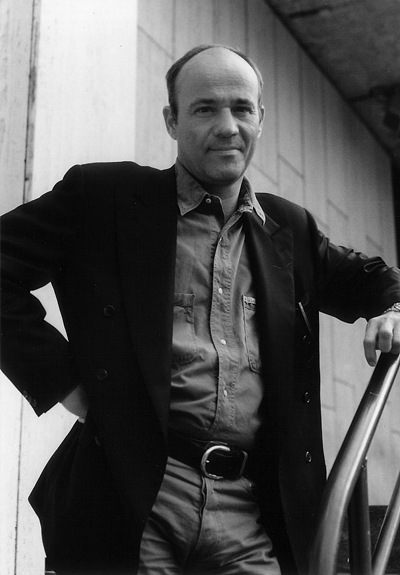
- Born: 10 April 1953 (age 73); Cologne, West Germany
- Occupation: Actor
- Years active: 1976–present

Heiner Lauterbach (German: [ˈhaɪnɐ ˈlaʊtɐbax]; born 10 April 1953) is a German actor.

== Life and work ==
Heiner Lauterbach was married to German actress Katja Flint who is the mother of his son Oscar (born 1988). Later he had a relationship with Jenny Elvers. Since 7 September 2001 he has been married to Viktoria Skaf. They have two children: Maya (born 2002) and Vito (born 2007). Heiner Lauterbach is the dubbed German voice for several American actors. Among others, he has dubbed Richard Gere, Jack Nicholson and Christopher Reeve.

=== Early life ===
Lauterbach attended a Waldorf school, from which he graduated with a general certificate (Mittlere Reife).

== Awards ==
- 1986 Deutscher Filmpreis
- 1996 Bayerischer Filmpreis (Bavarian Film Awards), Best Actor
- 1997 Bambi
- 1998 Darstellerpreis der Deutschen Akademie der Künste
- 1998 Bayerischer Fernsehpreis

== Filmography ==
=== Film ===
Year	Title	Role	Director	Cast	Notes
1984	Kolp	Karl	Roland Suso Richter	Frank Röth	
1985	Men...	Julius	Doris Dörrie	Uwe Ochsenknecht, Ulrike Kriener	
1986	Paradise	Viktor	Doris Dörrie	Katharina Thalbach, Sunnyi Melles	
1989	Bangkok Story	Michael Brandau	Rolf von Sydow	Günther Maria Halmer, Rolf Hoppe	
1989	African Timber	Peter Bechtle	Peter F. Bringmann	Deborah Lacey, Julien Guiomar, Dietmar Schönherr	
1993	Ebbie's Bluff	Ebbie	Claude-Oliver Rudolph	Til Schweiger	
1994	Charlie & Louise – Das doppelte Lottchen	Wolf Palfy	Joseph Vilsmaier	Corinna Harfouch	
1996	The Superwife	Viktor Lange	Sönke Wortmann	Veronica Ferres	
1997	Rossini	Oskar Reiter	Helmut Dietl	Götz George, Mario Adorf, Veronica Ferres, Gudrun Landgrebe	
1998	Der Campus	Professor Hackmann	Sönke Wortmann	Sandra Speichert, Martin Benrath	
1998	Cascadeur: The Amber Chamber	Oberst	Hardy Martins	Hardy Martins, Charles Régnier	
1998	The Polar Bear	Gesundheitsinspektor	Til Schweiger	Til Schweiger, Benno Fürmann	
1999	Enlightenment Guaranteed	Heiner	Doris Dörrie	Uwe Ochsenknecht	
1999	Paradise Mall	Mark Popp	Friedemann Fromm	Franka Potente, Daniel Brühl	
2000	Marlene	Erich Pommer	Joseph Vilsmaier	Katja Flint	
2012	Vatertage – Opa über Nacht	Lambert	Ingo Rasper	Sebastian Bezzel	
2013	Break Up Man	Georg Adler	Matthias Schweighöfer	Matthias Schweighöfer, Catherine De Léan	
2013	Harms	Harms	Nikolai Müllerschön		
2013	The Blind Spot	Hans Langemann	Daniel Harrich	Benno Fürmann, Nicolette Krebitz	
2013	Stalingrad	Oberstleutnant Henze	Fyodor Bondarchuk	Pyotr Fyodorov	
2014	Wir sind die Neuen	Eddi	Ralf Westhoff	Gisela Schneeberger	
2016	Welcome to Germany	Dr. Richard Hartmann	Simon Verhoeven	Senta Berger	
2017	Unter deutschen Betten	Friedrich Berger	Jan Fehse	Veronica Ferres	
2019	The Collini Case	Richard Mattinger	Marco Kreuzpaintner	Elyas M'Barek, Franco Nero, Alexandra Maria Lara	
2023	The Interpreter of Silence	Wilhelm Boger			

=== Television ===
Year	Title	Role	Cast	Notes
1978	Derrick: Ein Hinterhalt	Hacker	Horst Tappert, Fritz Wepper	
1979	Derrick: Anschlag auf Bruno	Schraudolf	Horst Tappert, Fritz Wepper	
1986	Die Andere	Walter Scheit		
1987	Duett in Bonn	Michail Koslow	Karin Boyd	6 episodes
1988	Ignaz Semmelweis: Gynecologist	Ignaz Semmelweis		
1988–1993	Eurocops	Thomas Dorn		16 episodes
1989	Liebe, Tod und Eisenbahn	Raimund	Christina Scholz	
1990	Derrick: Der Einzelgänger	Ingo	Horst Tappert, Fritz Wepper	
1991	Tatort: Wer zweimal stirbt	Zenker	Miroslav Nemec, Udo Wachtveitl	
1991	No Mention of Violence	Max Steinbecker	Katja Riemann	
1991	Der Fahnder: Tauschgeschäfte	Lutz	Klaus Wennemann	
1992	Wolffs Revier: Geldwäscher	Bela Ungaro	Jürgen Heinrich	
1992	Eine phantastische Nacht	Michael Jardeen	Heidelinde Weis	
1993	Derrick: Geschlossene Wände	Rob Simon	Horst Tappert, Fritz Wepper, Constanze Engelbrecht, Hanns Zischler	
1993	Tatort: Flucht nach Miami	Kampen	Martin Lüttge, Klaus J. Behrendt	
1994–1997	Faust	Oskar Faust		24 episodes
1996	The Shadow Man	Fritz Gehlen	Mario Adorf, Heinz Hoenig, Günter Strack	TV miniseries
1996	A Girl Called Rosemary	Konrad Hartog	Nina Hoss, Til Schweiger, Mathieu Carrière, Hannelore Elsner	
1997	Tatort: Mord hinterm Deich	Hanno Dehart	Manfred Krug	
1997	The Scorpion	Josef Berthold		
1998	Opernball	Kurt Frazer	Franka Potente, Caroline Goodall, Richard Bohringer, Gudrun Landgrebe, Désirée Nosbusch	
1998	Der dreckige Tod	Oskar Kunze		
1998	One Step Too Far	Bert Feltoff	Gudrun Landgrebe, Rolf Hoppe	
1998	Tödliche Diamanten	Paul Schalla	Jan Niklas	
2000	Zwei Asse und ein König	Jan de Fries	Martin Benrath, Heinz Hoenig	
2000	Nicht heulen, Husky	Oliver	Barbara Rudnik	
2001	The Publisher	Axel Springer		
2002	Die Affäre Semmeling	Friedrich Asmus	Mario Adorf, Heike Makatsch, Robert Atzorn, Heinz Hoenig	TV miniseries
2002	Deadly Rendezvous	Mike Hansen	Sandra Speichert, Heinz Hoenig, Martin Semmelrogge	
2003	Eine Liebe in Afrika	Jo	Hannelore Elsner, Renée Soutendijk	
2004	Kommissarin Lucas: Vergangene Sünden	Ernst Schenker	Ulrike Kriener	
2006	Storm Tide	Alexander Claussen	Götz George	
2006	Dresden	Carl Mauth		
2006	Donna Leon: Death in a Strange Country	Augusto Viscardis	Uwe Kockisch	
2007	Mitten im Leben	Alex Krüger	Sandra Speichert	9 episodes
2007	Abducted	Robert Lund	Claudia Michelsen	
2008	Ship of No Return: The Final Voyage of the Gustloff	Kapitänleutnant Harald Kehding		
2008	Final Proclamation	Rami Hamdan	Gottfried John	
2008	The Wall: The Final Days	Bert Schäfer		
2009	Volcano	Gerhard Maug		
2010	Ice Fever	Stanley Oxenford	Isabella Ferrari	Based on Whiteout
2011	Hindenburg: The Last Flight	Hugo Eckener	Greta Scacchi, Stacy Keach	
2013	Heroes	Chancellor of Germany	Christiane Paul, Christine Neubauer, Hannes Jaenicke, Armin Rohde, Emilia Schüle, Jannis Niewöhner, Yvonne Catterfeld	
2013	The Old Fox: Gestern ist nie vorbei	Andreas Kroesinger	Jan-Gregor Kremp	
2015	Tannbach	Georg von Striesow		TV miniseries
2015	Master of Death	Alexander Stengele	Veronica Ferres	
2016	Spuren der Rache	Frank Hennings		
2017	Gift	Günther Kompalla		
2018	Unzertrennlich nach Verona	Jan Biggemann	Veronica Ferres	
