= Gloria Gray =

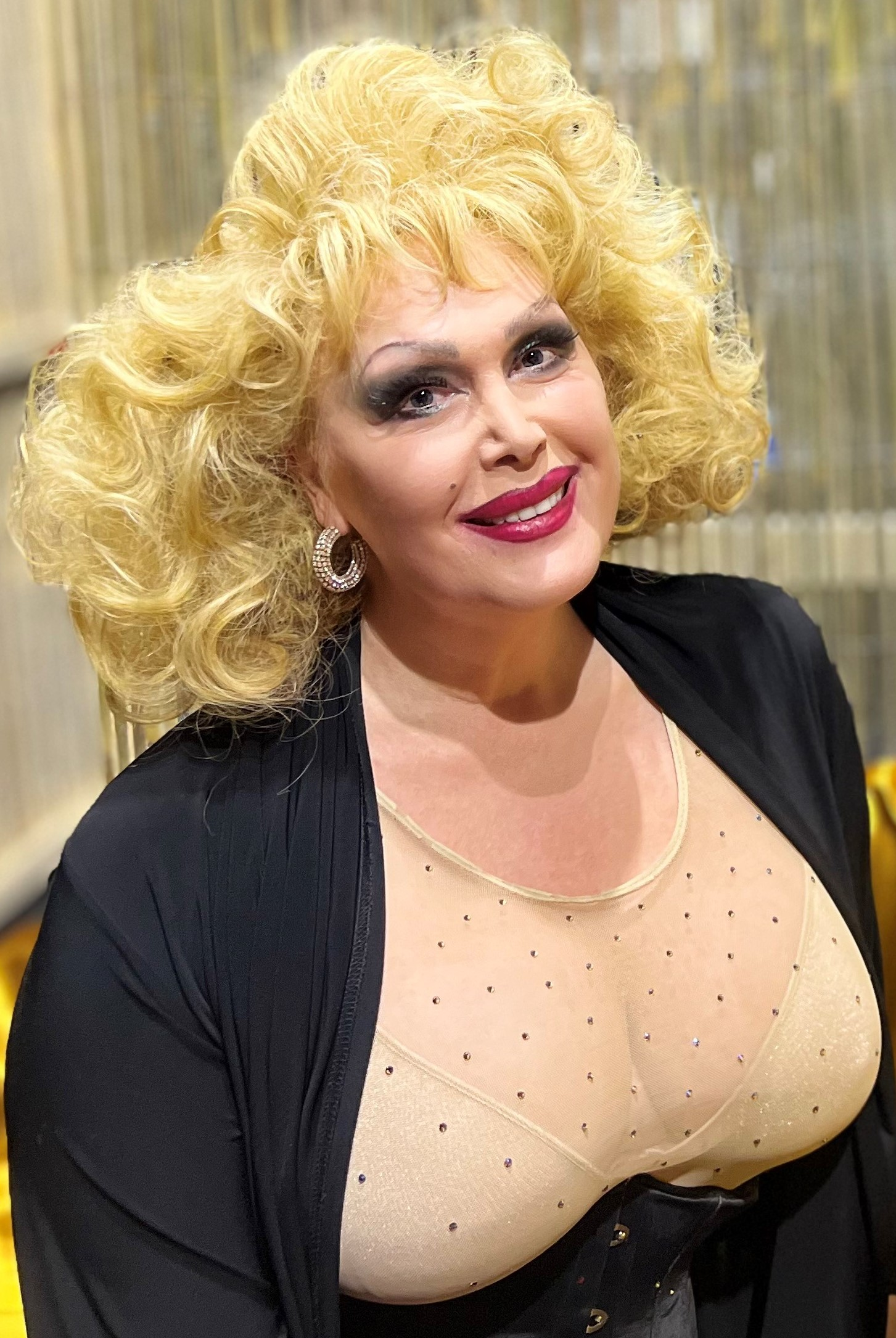
Gloria Gray in 2024

Gloria Gray (born 22 December 1965 in Zwiesel; real name: Gloria Gehring) is a German actress, singer, author, entrepreneur, model and entertainer.

== Career ==
Gray was born in Zwiesel, Lower Bavaria, and spent her childhood and school years there. After an apprenticeship, she moved to Munich and later completed acting training at the German Drama Academy.

She made her first appearances as an artist in Munich in various small off-theaters, in the off- and lesbian, gay, and transgender scenes, as well as at private events with travesti theatre companies. She performed with a friend as the Twilight Girls and the Munich Follies. From 1991 she had her own Gloria Gray Show. In 1993 she became known to a wider audience in Germany through the Sat.1-Comedy show Halli Galli. Since 1994 she has performed as a Varieté artist. Her premiere was at the Munich Theater am Platzl, where she played over 300 performances En-suite-Spielbetrieb.

Gray first made her international debut in 2000 as Revue-Diva Mae West in Joseph Vilsmaier's film Marlene. That same year, she performed alongside musician Fancy in the German preliminary round of the Eurovision Song Contest. Gray toured for months with comedian Tom Gerhardt and appeared on stage with Marianne Sägebrecht in Säge+Brecht.

Spanish television hired Gloria Gray as a presenter and singer for a live broadcast during Gay Pride in 2004 and 2005. At Christopher Street Day 2006 in Munich, she premiered her program "Songs in a Bodice" in the old town hall. In 2007, Gray modeled for photographer Folker Schellenberg for the two photo exhibitions "Magic of Diversity" and "Weibsbilder" (Women). Since October 2008, Gray has accompanied the dinner show " Giovane Elber 's do Brazil" as "Mistress of Ceremony." She co-organized the first AIDS benefit gala in Munich and regularly supports charitable events.

In the summer of 2010, Gloria Gray moved from her adopted home of Munich back to Zwiesel and opened her Café Gloria with an adjoining cabaret stage in a disused horse stable. Her move and the opening of her event café were documented and broadcast by Sat.1 as part of the reportage series 24 Hours.

In addition to the daily coffeehouse business, various artists exhibited their works in the café, among them Peter Knirsch – the long-time partner of Lisa Fitz – who exhibited his paintings under his artist name PAKO in 2011. Other prominent artists who performed and exhibited at Café Gloria included Marianne Sägebrecht, Willy Michl , Cleo Kretschmer, Eisi Gulp, Lilo Wanders and Nepo Fitz. At the end of 2013, Gray closed her restaurant.

From 2012 to 2014, Gray performed in various theaters and cabarets with her musical Verwurzelt (Rooted) (directed by Gerd Riffeser). In this program, she focused on her connection to her homeland, or rather, her "roots." In addition to the stage production, Munich photographer Manuel Jacob showcased her in the photo exhibition of the same name, Und es gibt sie wirklich (And They Really Exist ). Bayerischer Rundfunk took this opportunity to broadcast another documentary about Gloria Gray, this time in the program Bergheimat (Mountain Homeland).

At the Carnaval International de Maspalomas in Spain in February 2015, the Bavarian entertainer sat on the jury for Spanish television.

In the 2014/2015 season, Gloria Gray appeared in the variety show Crazy Palace in Karlsruhe. At the end of 2015, she launched her show Glanz & Gloria to celebrate her 30th stage anniversary and her 50th birthday. This show toured for two years and was accompanied by an exhibition about Gray's work and life in Zwiesel.

In autumn 2024, Gray played the title role in Dirk Dobbrows's play of the same name. In Bernd Seidel's production, which premiered on October 26, 2024, at the Wolf-Ferrari-Haus in Ottobrunn, Gloria Gray played alongside Patrick Gabriel and Robert Dudek.

== Politics ==
In December 2010, Gray announced her candidacy in the mayoral election in Zwiesel, which took place at the end of January 2011, but did not receive enough supporting signatures. In 2016, she ran again in the mayoral election and this time received the signatures required for her candidacy. In the election on November 27, 2016, she received 20.12 percent of the votes cast without party affiliation. In May 2020, she was elected to the district council of the Regen district on the FDP list. She ran again in the mayoral election in Zwiesel on November 27, 2022, achieving the best result of the five candidates with 31.56 percent and reaching the runoff election, in which she was defeated by the SPD candidate Karl-Heinz Eppinger with 46.03 percent on December 11, 2022. In the district election on 8 October 2023, Gray achieved 11.3 percent in the first round (Ronny Raith (CSU) was elected with 60.4 percent ahead of Johann Müller (AfD) with 23 percent).

== Personal life ==
Privately, Gray lived in Munich for many years before returning to her hometown of Zwiesel in 2010. In May 2006, she announced her intention to marry her long-term partner in Munich's Asam Church. The planned wedding was first scheduled and then canceled by the Catholic Church. Gloria Gray's transgender status was also always in the focus of public interest.

In 2009, she published her biography With All That I Am: My Life with private insights into her life.

== Publications ==
- Mit allem, was ich bin: Mein Leben. Nymphenburger. 2009. ISBN 978-3-485-01170-9.
- mit Robin Felder: Zurück nach Übertreibling. Vikki Victorias erster Zwischenfall – Krimi. dtv Verlagsgesellschaft, 2021. ISBN 978-3-423-22009-5
- mit Robin Felder: Grüße aus Bad Seltsham. Vikki Victorias zweiter Zwischenfall – Krimi. dtv Verlagsgesellschaft, 2022. ISBN 978-3-423-22019-4
- mit Robin Felder: Jenseits von Verhausen. Vikki Victorias dritter Zwischenfall – Krimi. dtv Verlagsgesellschaft, 2024. ISBN 978-3-423-21887-0
