= Vera Brühne (film) =

2001 film

- Directed by: Hark Bohm
- Starring: Corinna Harfouch; Uwe Ochsenknecht
- Country of origin: Germany
- Original language: German

Production
- Running time: 4h 46min

Original release
- Release: 24 May 2001

Vera Brühne (English: The Trials of Vera B.) is a 2001 two-part German TV film about Vera Brühne who was convicted of murder.

== Cast ==
- Corinna Harfouch as Vera Brühne
- Uwe Ochsenknecht as Johann "Hans" Ferbach
- Ulrich Noethen as Prosecutor Böck
- Hans Werner Meyer as Dr. Haddenhorst
- Fritz Wepper as Lawyer Dr. Wallner
- Bernd Fischerauer as Dr. Vogt
- Udo Wachtveitl as Sternmüller
- Anton Pointecker as Dr. Dietrich Schwarz
- Kai Ivo Baulitz as Pfeffer
- Hark Bohm as Prof. Peters
- Mavie Hörbiger as Stephanie Virno
- Valerie Niehaus as Helga Haddenhorst
- Hanns Zischler as Kanzleramtsminister Prof. Behmke
- Michael Degen as Ernst Virno
- Katja Flint as Isabel Mende
