= Katja Flint =

German actress (born 1959)

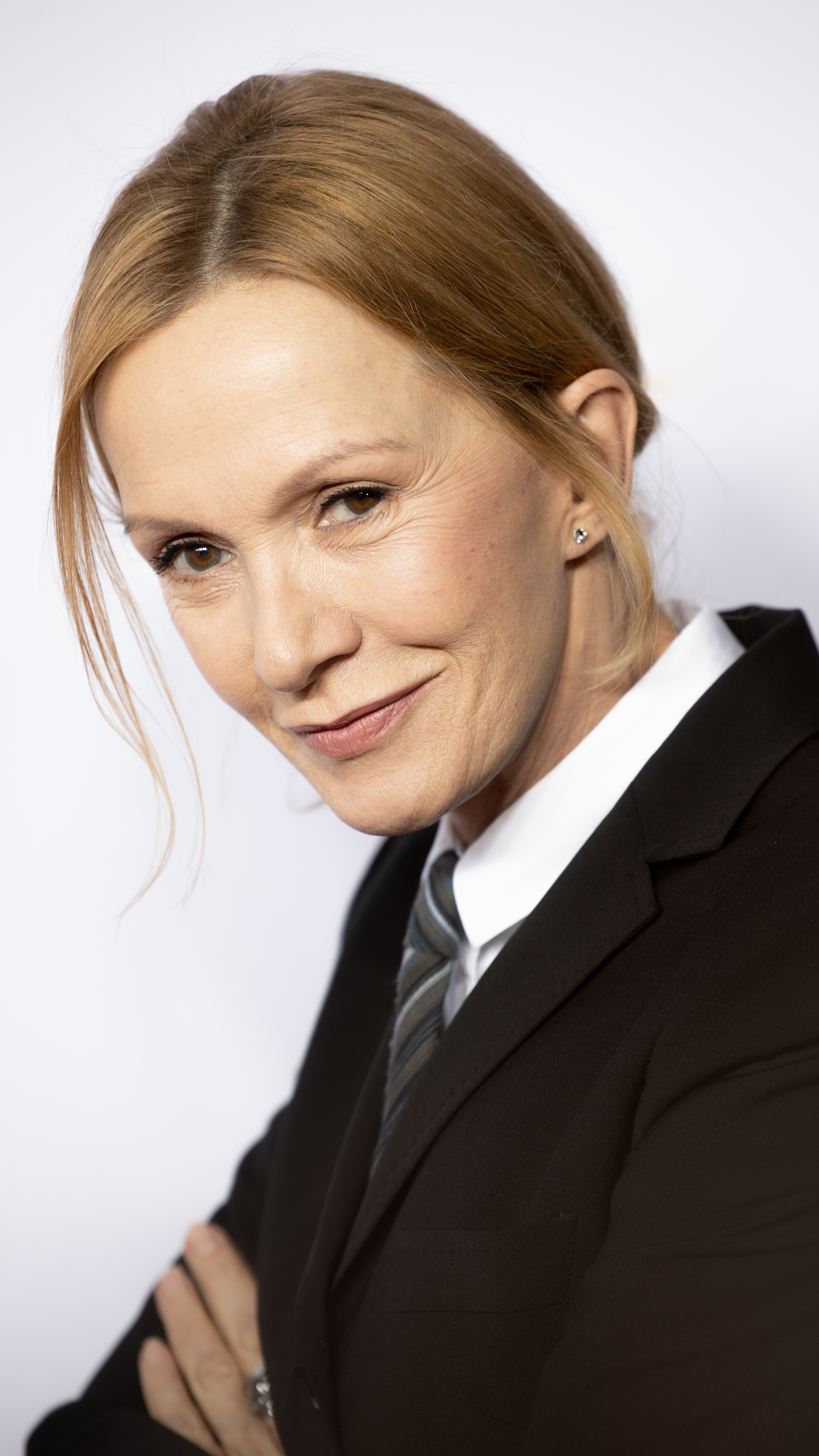
Flint at the Berlinale 2020

Katja Flint (born 11 November 1959 in Stadthagen, Lower Saxony) is a German actress. She has appeared in over 100 film and television productions since 1982. Among her more notable roles is Marlene Dietrich in the film biopic Marlene (2000).

Born in Germany, Flint grew up in Utah and was married to German actor Heiner Lauterbach between 1985 and 2001, although they already separated in 1991. They have a son named Oscar who was born in 1988. She was in long-term relationships with Bernd Eichinger, a German film-producer, in the 1990s and Peter Handke, an Austrian author, in the early 2000s.

== Filmography ==
- Piratensender Powerplay (1982)
- Kolp (1984)
- Forget Mozart (1985)
- Leo und Charlotte (1991, TV miniseries)
- The Democratic Terrorist (1992)
- The Invincibles (1994)
- The Venus Killer (1996, TV film)
- A Girl Called Rosemary (1996, TV film)
- Vicky's Nightmare (1998, TV film)
- Widows – Erst die Ehe, dann das Vergnügen (1998)
- Rhapsody in Blood (1998, TV film)
- A Big Job (1999, TV film)
- Straight Shooter (1999), as Regina Toelle
- Marlene (2000)
- Vera Brühne (2001, TV film)
- Il giovane Casanova (2002, TV film)
- Olgas Sommer (2003)
- Love and Desire (2003, TV film)
- Chaos Mum (2004, TV film)
- Pfarrer Braun: Der Fluch der Pröpstin (2004, TV series episode)
- Intrigue and Love (2005, TV film)
- The White Masai (2005)
- Beyond the Balance (2006)
- Why Men Don't Listen and Women Can't Read Maps (2007)
- Der verlorene Sohn (2009, TV film)
