= Delia Mayer =

Swiss actress and singer

Delia Mayer (born 8 March 1967) is a Hong Kong-born Swiss actress and singer. She is known for her roles as Isabel Becker in the German television series Die Cleveren and as Miriam Shapiro in the German-American television drama mini-series Unorthodox.

== Biography ==
Mayer was born on 8 March 1967 in Hong Kong. She is the daughter of Swiss jazz musician Vali Mayer and sister of Jojo Mayer, and grew up near Zürich. She trained in acting, dance, and singing in Vienna and classical singing at the Zürich Conservatory and the BGZ Opera School.

She played Isabel Becker in the German television series Die Cleveren and as Miriam Shapiro in the German-American television miniseries Unorthodox.
