= Charlie & Louise – Das doppelte Lottchen =

1994 film by Joseph Vilsmaier

- Directed by: Joseph Vilsmaier
- Based on: Das doppelte Lottchen by Erich Kästner
- Produced by: Peter Zenk
- Starring: Fritzi Eichhorn; Floriane Eichhorn
- Cinematography: Joseph Vilsmaier
- Edited by: Hannes Nikel
- Music by: Norbert Jürgen Schneider
- Production company: Bavaria Film
- Distributed by: Bavaria Film
- Release date: 17 February 1994
- Running time: 98 minutes
- Country: Germany
- Language: German

Charlie & Louise – Das doppelte Lottchen is a German children's film directed by Joseph Vilsmaier in 1994, starring Corinna Harfouch. It is a film adaptation of the 1949 novel Lisa and Lottie (German: Das doppelte Lottchen) by Erich Kästner.

== Plot ==
Two 12-year-old girls, Charlotte "Charlie" Palfy from Berlin and Louise Kröger from Hamburg, meet on a train going to a language school in Scotland. They are shocked to see how much they look alike. They soon find out they are identical twins. Shortly after their birth, their parents split up, and each of them took one girl. Neither girl knew she had a twin sister, and they both believed their other parent was dead. Though they look alike, they are very different in personality. Charlie, as the daughter of a music hall composer, is cool, self-confident, and somewhat impolite, dresses accordingly, and listens to techno music. Louise, who grew up with her mother, who works in advertising, wears conservative clothing and is rather shy and quiet.

The two girls concoct a plan to find out why they were separated by their parents. Charlie travels to their mother in Hamburg, pretending to be Louise, who in turn pretends to be Charlie and travels to their father in Berlin. Much chaos ensues as both girls try to settle into their new lives without anyone noticing the difference. The girls' situation gets even more difficult when they realise both parents have new partners, whom they intend to marry.

In the end, Charlie and Louise can think of no other way than to run away to get their parents back together. They travel to Scotland and hide in an old lighthouse, from where they are rescued by their parents.

Back in Hamburg, the father agrees that both girls can stay with their mother. He gets on the train back to Berlin, but before the train has pulled out of the station, he finds a note by Charlie in his pocket saying "Es gibt Momente im Leben, da muss man die Notbremse ziehen" ("There are moments in life in which you've got to pull the emergency brake" - Note: In German, the expression "die Notbremse ziehen" can also mean "to pull out of a situation before it's too late"). He pulls the emergency brake, leaves the train, and decides to stay with his family after all.

== Cast ==
- Fritzi Eichhorn: Charlotte "Charlie" Palfy
- Floriane Eichhorn: Louise Kröger
- Corinna Harfouch: Sabine Luiselotte Kröger
- Heiner Lauterbach: Wolf Palfy
- Hanns Zischler: Dieter Reich, Sabine Kröger's boyfriend
- Hans Werner Meyer: English teacher Jochen
- April Hailer: Sunny, Wolf Palfy's girlfriend

== Differences between the film and Erich Kästner's book ==
The whole story has been modernised. It now takes place in the 1990s. Due to that fact, many aspects of the original story have been changed. Here are some of the important differences:

- In the original version, Luise (note also the different spelling) is the lively girl who lives with her father, whereas Lotte is the shy girl who lives with her mother. In the movie, it is the other way around, probably because these days, Luise/Louise is a rather old-fashioned name that better fits a shy, conservative girl.
- The parents' names have been changed, as well. This is most interesting in the case of the mother. Her original first name, Luiselotte, has now become her middle name. The reason is probably the same as in the case of the girls' names: In the 1990s, it would be very unusual for a middle-aged woman to have an old-fashioned name such as Luiselotte.

== Soundtrack ==
Lessmann/Ziller released a single in 1994 entitled "Charlie & Louise" for which the Germany musical duo, known from Bonfire, perform four different versions of the title song from the movie.
