= Lara Mandoki =

German actress

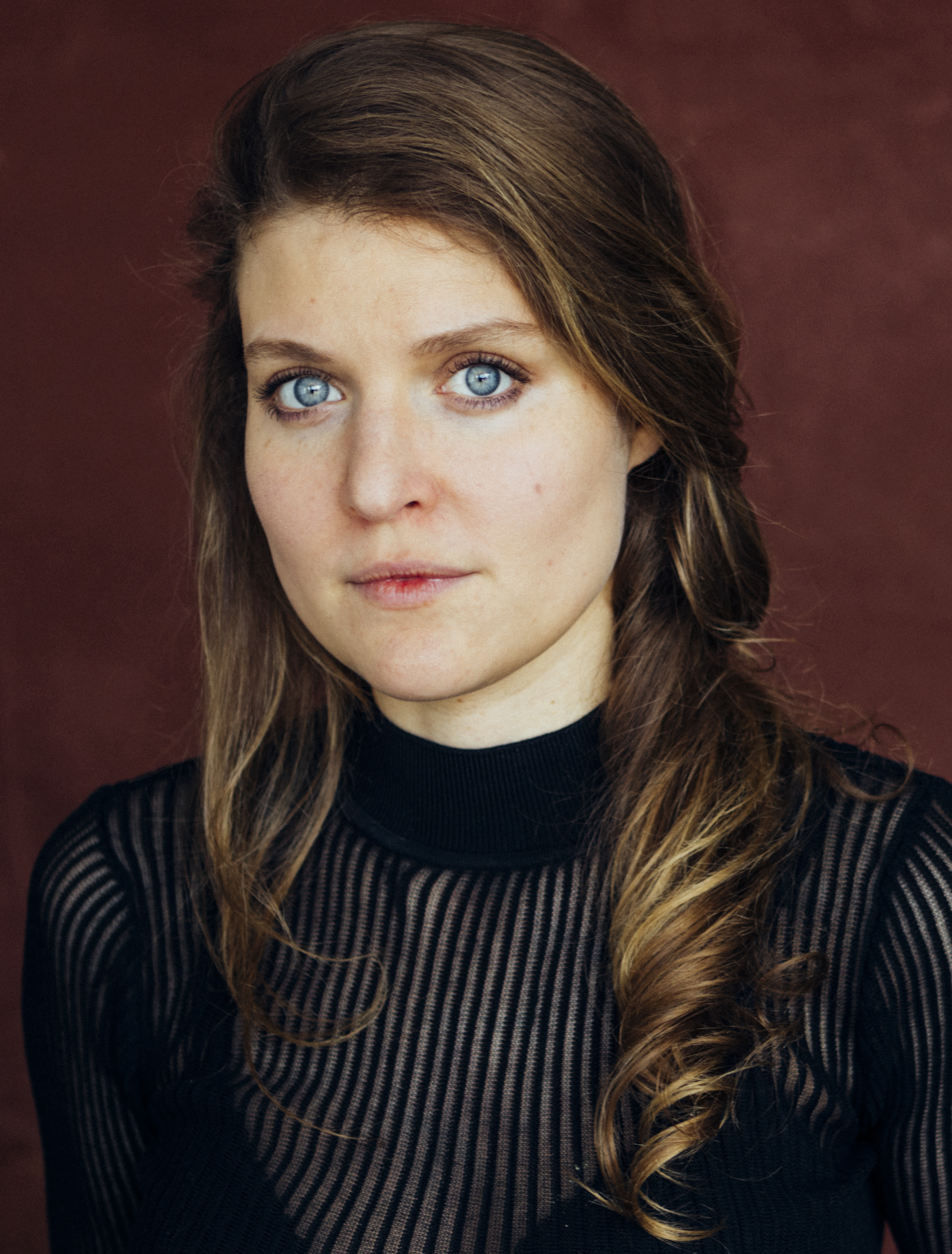
- Lara Mandoki in 2024
- Born: 17 September 1992 (age 33); Munich, Bavaria, West Germany
- Occupation: Actress
- Years active: 2006–present
- Known for: Das Boot (Sky) Unterm Radar (Emmy-winning thriller); X Company (Canadian–Hungarian WWII series) Erzgebirgskrimi (ZDF series; lead detective since 2018)
- Website: laramandoki.com

Lara Mandoki (born September 17, 1992) is a German actress with a diverse career spanning television, film, and theatre. She began her acting career in 2006 and has since appeared in a variety of notable productions, including the Sky Series Das Boot, the Emmy-winning thriller Unterm Radar, and the ZDF Show Erzgebirgskrimi where she has been playing the lead detective since 2018. Her theatre work includes a significant role in the 240-hour performance installation Meat at the Schaubühne Berlin. In 2015, Mandoki gained international recognition with her role in the Canadian-Hungarian co-production X Company. In 2023, Mandoki played a leading role in the ARTE international documentary drama-series A World Divided as Hedwig Höss.

== Background, education, and theatre ==
Lara Mandoki, the daughter of Hungarian musician Leslie Mandoki, pursued her acting studies in Munich and Los Angeles. Next to German, Mandoki speaks Hungarian natively, as a result of her family's Hungarian origin. During her training, she gained experience in numerous theatre productions, including performances at the Münchner Kammerspiele. Her involvement extended to significant projects such as the 240-hour performance installation Meat at the Schaubühne Berlin and Dieter Wedel’s Shakespeare production Die Komödie der Irrungen at the Bad Hersfelder Festspiele, where she played the role of Maisha.

== Film and television ==
Mandoki played her first film role in 2006 in the short film Lia. Her television career then gained momentum with her role as Herta Levin in the ZDF historical drama Die Holzbaronin (2012), where she appeared alongside Christine Neubauer. Her versatility was showcased in 2014 when she hosted the ZDF documentary miniseries Nicht alles war schlecht, in which the post-Cold War generation attempts to understand what life was like in a divided Germany.

Mandoki further established her reputation with roles in the Emmy Award-winning thriller Unterm Radar (2015) and Mira Thiel’s film comedy Gut zu Vögeln (2016). Her performance in Lars Montag’s tragicomedy Sex, Pity and Loneliness (2017) earned critical acclaim and multiple German Film Award nominations.

She made her international breakthrough with her role in the highly successful Canadian-Hungarian co-production X Company (2017), an espionage thriller about World War II. This success was followed by her appearance in Duncan Jones' Mute (2018) for Netflix.

The year 2018 also saw her in Der große Rudolph, directed by Alexander Adolph, where she portrayed Dolly alongside Hannelore Elsner, Florian Stadlhuber, and Sunny Melles. Additionally, she starred in the political thriller Die Affäre Borgward directed by Marcus H. Rosenmüller, and played the lead role in the Sat.1 comedy Babyboom, directed by Kai Meyer-Ricks. Her role in the ARD drama Daddy Blues involved portraying a young woman who must assume responsibility for her paralyzed friend after an accident.

Since 2018, Mandoki has been widely recognized for her portrayal of Commissioner Karina Szabo in the ZDF Saturday night crime series Erzgebirgskrimi. Several films in the series have been successful, including notable films like Familienband by Thorsten M. Schmidt, which attracted nearly seven million viewers. In the same year, she made a guest appearance in the film Leberkäsjunkie from the Eberhofer crime series alongside Simon Schwarz and Sebastian Bezzel. In 2019, Mandoki starred in the thriller Jan Römer for ARD, directed by Felix Herzogenrath, as a young investigative journalist.

Mandoki took a lead role in the ZDFneo series Macht der Kränkung – Sunshine City (2020), directed by Umut Dag, and worked with Wolfgang Murnberger in the Steirerkrimi in Graz, where she portrayed a Hungarian forced prostitute.

Her 2021 projects included a lead role in the Amazon Prime series Der Beischläfer and the highly acclaimed ZDF crime drama Tod einer Hoffnung. The following year, she appeared in the ARD comedy Vätertage, where she made her on-camera singing debut. Mandoki also worked on the BBC series Vienna Blood, filming in Mandoki's second home, Budapest.

In 2023, Mandoki was featured in the fourth season of Das Boot (Sky) as Dagmar Dewitt. She also starred as Hedwig Höss in the series The End of Dreams (ARTE), filmed at the Auschwitz site under the direction of Olga Chajdow. Additionally, she worked on Simon Verhoeven’s Girl You Know It’s True, which delves into the 80s/90s music scene. In the autumn of 2023, Mandoki continued her role as Commissioner Szabo in the ZDF prime time series Erzgebirgskrimi, filming two additional episodes. Her performance in the series, which includes episodes directed by Markus Imboden, has been well-received.

Looking ahead, 2024 will see Mandoki in the crime drama Wintermord directed by Tim Trageser and in the dramatic film Über die Grenze with Thorsten M. Schmidt. She will also star in the dramedy Petra geht baden, directed by Rainer Kauffman in Prague, and in Vienna, she will take a leading role in the dark comedy Mama ist die Besti(e) (AT) alongside Adele Neuhaus, both for ZDF prime time.

== Filmography ==
=== Film ===
Year	Title	Role	Notes
2012	Die Holzbaronin	Herta Lenvin	Television Film
2014	Gut zu Vögeln	Pia	
2014	Schwägereltern	Alina Schumann	Television Film
2015	Unterm Radar	Nina	Television Film
2015	Eine Sommerliebe zu dritt	Betty	Television Film
2016	Einsamkeit und Sex und Mitleid	Vivien	
2016	Ein Dorf rockt ab	Roxy	Television Film
2016	Mute	Judie	
2017	Der große Rudolph	Dolly	Television Film
2018	Die Affäre Borgward	Betty Zech	Television Film
2018	Leberkäsjunkie	Amy	
2019	Das Lied des toten Mädchens	Stefanie 'Mütze' Schneider	Television Film
2022	Wenn Papa auf der Matte steht	Tilda	Television Film
2023	Girl You Know It's True	Nina	
2024	Petra geht baden	Georgette	Television Film

=== Television ===
Year	Title	Role	Notes
2011	Lena Fauch	Hundeverkäuferin	"Lena Fauch und die Tochter des Amokläufers"
2012	Heiter bis tödlich: Hubert und Staller	Alina Bayer	"Finger im Brot"
2012	Sturm der Liebe	Mandy Meier	115 episodes
2013	Mordsfreunde – Ein Taunuskrimi	Marion Rehmer	
2013	Rosamunde Pilcher		"Alte Herzen rosten nicht"
2013	Die Garmisch-Cops	Peggy Lang	"Tod auf dem Eis"
2015	Der Alte	Karo Wilke	"Tödliche Ideale"
2015	SOKO Stuttgart	Isa Neumann	2 episodes
2016	X Company	Bertha	2 episodes
2017	Die Bergretter	Dana	"Entzug"
2017	Tonio & Julia – Kneifen gilt nicht	Lisa	
2018	SOKO Donau	Maria Radu	"Tod im Taxi"
2018	Toni, männlich, Hebamme – Daddy Blues	Romy	
2018	Der Tote im Stollen	Karina Szabo	Erzgebirgskrimi
2019	Ein starkes Team – Parkplatz bitte sauber halten	Ely Hadraschek	
2019	Tödlicher Akkord	Karina Szabo	Erzgebirgskrimi
2020	Am Anschlag – Die Macht der Kränkung	Bettina	4 episodes
2020	Landkrimi – Steirertod	Bianca	
2020	Der Tote im Burggraben	Karina Szabo	Erzgebirgskrimi
2020	Der letzte Bissen	Karina Szabo	Erzgebirgskrimi
2021	Der Beischläfer	Frida Fenris	Season 2 - 7 episodes
2021	Verhängnisvolle Recherche	Karina Szabo	Erzgebirgskrimi
2021	Tödliche Abrechnung	Karina Szabo	Erzgebirgskrimi
2022	Vienna Blood – Rendezvous mit dem Tod	Selma Wirth	
2022	Ein Mord zu Weihnachten	Karina Szabo	Erzgebirgskrimi
2022	Familienband	Karina Szabo	Erzgebirgskrimi
2023	Die Tränen der Mütter	Karina Szabo	Erzgebirgskrimi
2023	Mord auf dem Jakobsweg	Karina Szabo	
2023	Die Spaltung der Welt / A World Divided / 1939-1961 : Les Divisions du Monde	Hedwig Höss	
2024	Wintermord	Karina Szabo	Erzgebirgskrimi
2024	Über die Grenze	Karina Szabo	Erzgebirgskrimi
2024	Mama ist die Best(i)e	Henny Baumann	

== Theatre (selection) ==
Year	Title	Role	Theatre	Director
2006	Von einem der auszog das Fürchten zu lernen	Rotkäppchen	Kammerspiele München	Ruth Fendel
2006	Madonna Live	Madonna Wannabe	Kammerspiele München	Ruth Fendel
2007	Lieb mich weg	Aynur	Kammerspiele München	Agnese Cornelio
2014	Meat	Nicolett Katona	Schaubühne Berlin	Bo Nilsson
2015	Die Komödie der Irrungen	Maisha	Bad Hersfelder Festspiele	Dieter Wedel
