= Marlene (2000 film) =

- Theatrical release poster
- Directed by: Joseph Vilsmaier
- Screenplay by: Christian Pfannenschmidt
- Produced by: Jutta Lieck-Klenke; Katharina M. Trebitsch
- Starring: Katja Flint; Herbert Knaup; Heino Ferch; Hans Werner Meyer; Christiane Paul; Suzanne von Borsody; Armin Rohde
- Cinematography: Joseph Vilsmaier
- Edited by: Barbara Hennings
- Music by: Harald Kloser; Thomas Wanker
- Distributed by: Senator Film
- Release date: 9 March 2000
- Running time: 132 min (Germany); 125 min (US)
- Countries: Germany, Italy
- Language: German
- Budget: $9 million
- Box office: $2,061,924

Marlene is a 2000 German biopic film directed by Joseph Vilsmaier and starring Katja Flint, Hans Werner Meyer and Herbert Knaup. It follows the life of the German actress Marlene Dietrich and her success in Hollywood.

== Cast ==
- Katja Flint as Marlene Dietrich
- Herbert Knaup as Rudolf Sieber
- Heino Ferch as Carl Seidlitz
- Hans Werner Meyer as Josef von Sternberg
- Christiane Paul as Tamara Matul
- Suzanne von Borsody as Charlotte Seidlitz
- Armin Rohde as Emil Jannings
- Josefina Vilsmaier as Maria aged 6
- Theresa Vilsmaier as Maria aged 10
- Janina Vilsmaier as Maria aged 13
- Monica Bleibtreu as Witwe von Losch
- Cosma Shiva Hagen as Resi
- Katharina Müller-Elmau as Margo Lion
- Oliver Elias as Jossi Winter
- Sandy Martin as Louella Parsons
- Richard Keats as Travis Banton
- Mike Wimberly as Harry
- Elvira Jimenez as Juanita
- Otto Sander as stage manager
- Heiner Lauterbach as Erich Pommer
- Ben Becker as Ernst Linke
- Jürgen Schornagel as Friedrich Mollner
- Götz Otto as Gary Cooper
- Ute Cremer as Maria Riva
- George Valencia as Carlos
- Gloria Gray as Mae West
- Michel Francoeur as Maurice Chevalier
- Heinrich Schafmeister as pianist

== Cited films ==
The movie contains "episodes" of the following films:

- The Blue Angel (1930)
- Morocco (1930)
- The Scarlet Empress (1934)

== Reception ==
The film was not well received in Germany and also did not open well at the box office, opening on 420 screens and grossing $700,000 in its first four days and finishing fifth at the German box office.
