= Straight Shooter (1999 film) =

1999 film

- Directed by: Thomas Bohn
- Starring: Dennis Hopper; Heino Ferch; Katja Flint; Hannelore Hoger; Ulrich Mühe; Errol A. C. Trotman Harewood
- Release date: 1999
- Running time: 88 min.
- Country: Germany
- Languages: English; German

Straight Shooter is a 1999 German film directed by Thomas Bohn and starring Dennis Hopper, Heino Ferch, Katja Flint, Hannelore Hoger, Ulrich Mühe, and Errol A. C. Trotman Harewood.

== Synopsis ==
An ex-member of the French Foreign Legion holds the German government responsible for the death of his family and goes on a killing spree to stop the operation of a nuclear plant.

The police are helpless and so the ex-instructor of the killer is brought to Germany to hunt the killer down.
