= A Girl Called Rosemary =

1996 film

- Directed by: Bernd Eichinger
- Starring: Nina Hoss; Heiner Lauterbach
- Country of origin: Germany
- Original language: German

Production
- Producer: Bernd Eichinger
- Running time: 135 min

Original release
- Release: 13 December 1996

A Girl Called Rosemary (German: Das Mädchen Rosemarie) is a 1996 German biography film directed by Bernd Eichinger. It is a remake of the 1958 film Rosemary.

== Cast ==
- Nina Hoss as Rosemarie Nitribitt
- Heiner Lauterbach as Konrad Hartog
- Mathieu Carrière as Fribert
- Hannelore Elsner as Marga Hartog
- Katja Flint as Christine
- Horst Krause as Willi
- Til Schweiger as Toni Nadler
- Heinrich Schafmeister
- Hanns Zischler
