= Heino Ferch =

German actor (born 1963)

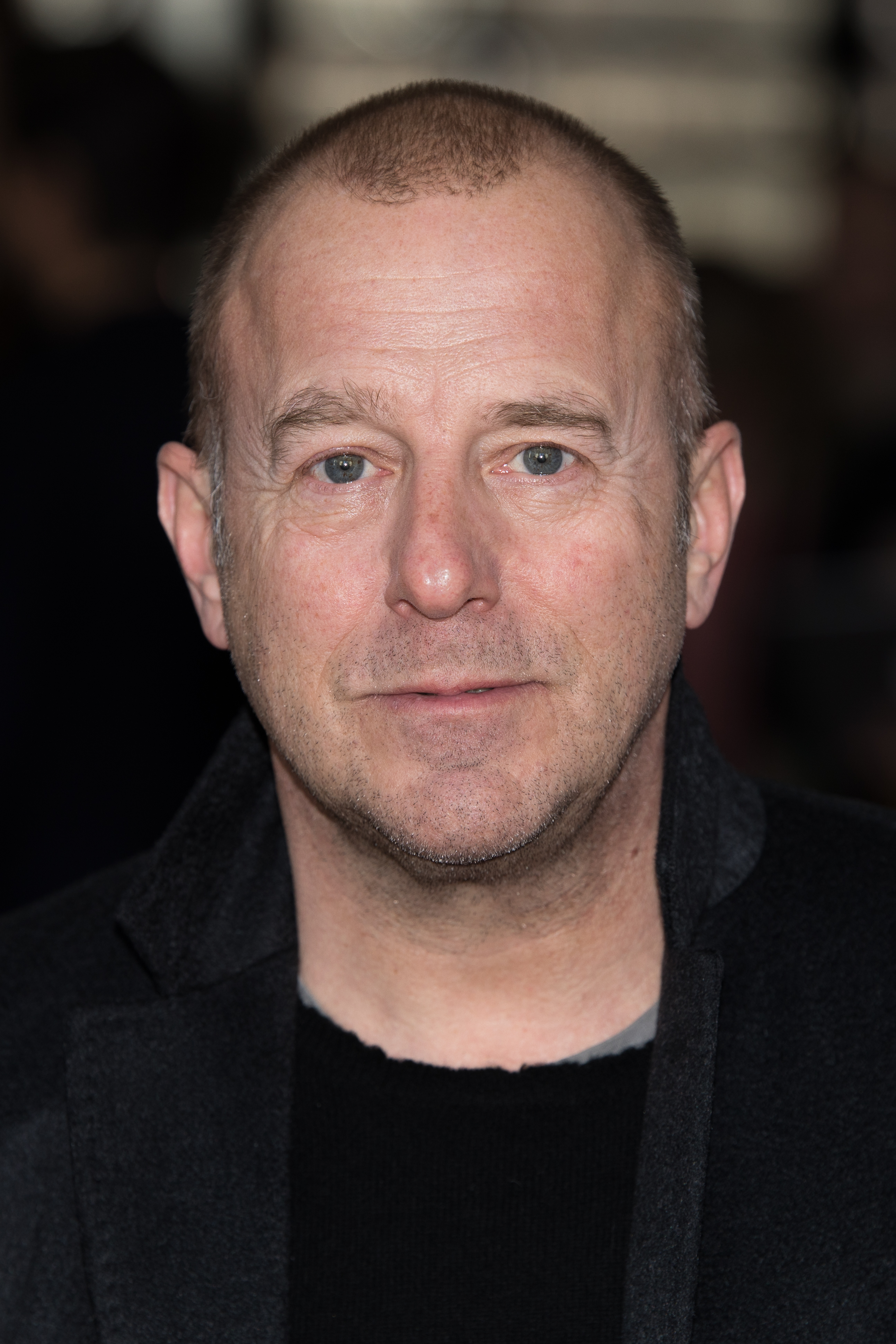
- Ferch in 2018
- Born: 18 August 1963 (age 63); Bremerhaven, West Germany
- Education: Mozarteum, Salzburg
- Occupations: Actor, voice actor
- Years active: 1985–present
- Spouse: Marie-Jeanette Steinle (m. 2005)
- Partner: Suzanne von Borsody (1990–1999)
- Children: 4
- Awards: Adolfe Grimme Award; Bambi Award; Bavarian Film Awards; Bavarian TV Awards; Golden Camera; Jupiter Award

Signature
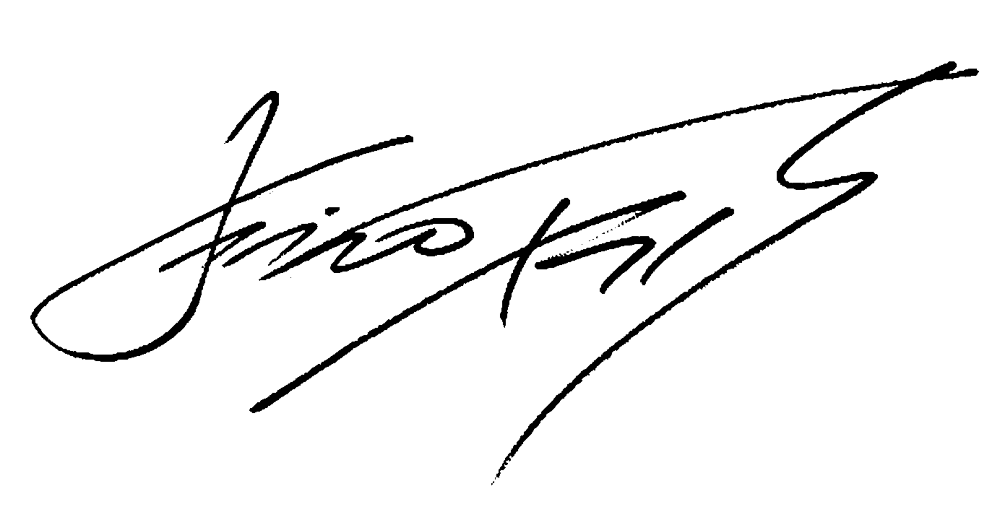

Heino Ferch (born 18 August 1963) is a German film, theatre and television actor. His notable film roles include Albert Speer in Downfall (2004) and Harry Melchior in The Tunnel (2001).

== Biography ==
The son of a merchant sea captain, Heino Ferch was on stage at the age of 15, while still attending grammar school. As a member of the stage ballet company in the musical Can-Can, he performed the tumbling acrobatics at the Stadttheater Bremerhaven in his home town. During this time, he also traveled through Europe as a federal member of the National League of Gymnastics.

Ferch studied acting at the University of Music and Performing Arts "Mozarteum" in Salzburg, Austria. He graduated in 1987. In addition to his main subject, drama, he also took courses in tap dancing, ballet, and singing.

Between 1987 and 2006, Ferch lived in Berlin, a city whose division after World War II and reunification in 1989 is repeatedly reflected in his work as a movie actor (The Tunnel, Mord am Meer, The Airlift, Cold Summer and The Miracle of Berlin). After his wedding in 2005, he moved his main residence to Bavaria.

Until 1999, he was in a nine-year relationship with actress Suzanne von Borsody but in 2000 he met Julia von Pufendorf, the daughter of the former under-secretary of state for cultural affairs for the city of Berlin. From this relationship, he fathered a daughter (Louisa, born 2000).

In 2002, Ferch met Marie-Jeanette Steinle, a National League Member of the military eventing squad, at the Bavarian Television Award celebration.

Three years later, in 2005, Ferch and Steinle married during the world's biggest sailing ship unification event, Sail 2005. The ceremony took place in the captain's lounge of the three-mast sailing ship Dar Młodzieży in Bremerhaven. A church wedding followed ten days later in Munster St. Maria Ascension in Dießen, Bavarian Ammersee. On 10 November 2008 Marie-Jeanette and Heino Ferch became parents to a daughter named Ava Vittoria Mercedès. The couple also became parents to a boy, Gustav Theo Cian on 4 November 2013.

The couple are highly active in polo sports - as players and in the promotion to the young. Both have DPV-Handicap of 0 (season 2010).

Ferch can speak German and English fluently, as well as some French.

== Work ==
=== Theatre ===
Ferch's first job after completing his studies was at the Freie Volksbühne Berlin. He was an ensemble player from 1987 to 1990, under the direction of Hans Neuenfels amongst others.

From 1990 to 1994 he was ensemble player at the Schiller Theatre, Berlin (Die Räuber; Mockinpott; Kasimir und Karoline; As you like it - director: Katharina Thalbach).

In 1992 he appeared at the Theater des Westens in Der Blaue Engel (screenplay after a novel by Heinrich Mann) under the direction of Peter Zadek.

He also appeared as guest actor at the Salzburg Festival (Un re in ascolto; Jedermann; Macbeth; Il ritorno d´Ulisse), at the Scala Milan and at the Burgtheater Vienna (Die Geisel).

=== Film ===
In 1987 Ferch made his feature film debut with a brief appearance in Schloß Königswald (directed by Peter Schamoni). In 1989 he played his first leading part in Wedding (which is the name of a Berlin working class quarter), as runner gone amok Klaus Asmus (director: Heiko Schier).

In 1994 he followed among many others works, a part in the notable TV-mini production Deutschlandlied (directed by Tom Toelle) where he played the part of Hanno Schmidbauer, a young cabinet maker at the end of World War II.

In 1996 he appeared as Napola-Commander Obersturmbannfuehrer Raufeisen in The Ogre (quote by Oscar award winner, director Volker Schloendorff: "…the young sympathetic social climber Raufeisen, wonderfully portraied by Heino Ferch..").

1997 was the year of his breakthrough as a film actor with his appearance as Jewish singer Roman Cycowski in The Harmonists (director: Josef Vilsmaier), a famous German a cappella singing ensemble of the early 1930s.

In 1997 he also played the leading part in Winter Sleepers, an early work by director Tom Tykwer (Run Lola Run, The Parfume)

In 1997 Ferch portrayed no less than nine different movie characters. In seven of these he played the leading role or co-lead. (Comedian Harmonists, Winter Sleepers, Life is All You Get, Play for your life, The Guardian Angel, Coma, Buddies, Lucie Aubrac, It happened at broad daylight)

In 1998 he starred as gangster Ronnie in Tom Tykwer`s breakthrough movie Run Lola Run.

In 2001 the TV-mini series The Tunnel (director: Roland Suso Richter) focused on the dramatic escape of 32 persons from the GDR. It received seven film awards and was sold to more than 28 countries. Ferch received the Golden Camera award as best actor for his role as Harry Melchior, a fictional figure based on real-life escapee Hasso Herschel.

In 2004 the film The Downfall (director: Oliver Hirschbiegel) was released. It received an Oscar nomination and was subsequently sold to 145 countries around the world. In this film Ferch played Hitler's architect and Minister for Armaments, Albert Speer.

After the turn of the millennium the German film production company teamworx started a new TV-format: the so-called event movies. Striking events form German history are combined with semi fictional story telling „making the past come alive" (teamworx-claim) (e.g. The Tunnel, The Airlift, Dresden, Storm Tide). Heino Ferch repeatedly spearheaded this format as featuring lead actor.

In 2005 eight million German viewers watched the TV-event The Airlift with Heino Ferch starring as American General Philipp Turner, a fictional character after General William H. Tunner, the organizer of the air-supply bridge in 1948/49 for the locked-in city of Berlin. The film received the Golden Camera award as best TV film of the year and was sold for transmission into 43 countries.

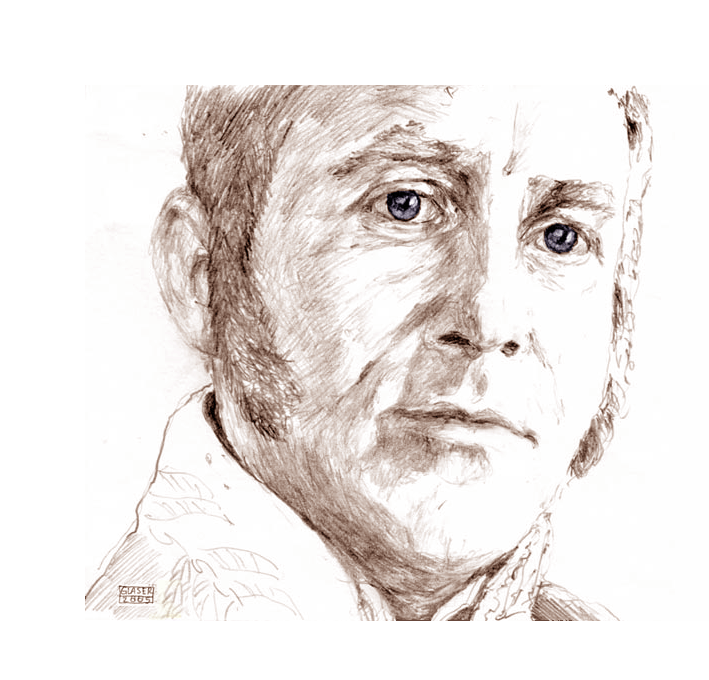
Heino Ferch as Marquis de Caulaincourt in "Napoléon"

In 2007 he starred in the teamworx production of The Hunt for Troy, the story of German businessman and amateur archeologist Heinrich Schliemann's search for the treasures of Homer's ancient Troy. The film aired in 32 countries. Ferch played the title role.

Heino Ferch also appears regularly in leading parts in smaller productions – often high quality thrillers. Most of these received various film awards. (e.g. The lawyer and his guest, The account, Hell in the head, Killing at seaside, Hunt for Justice.) Now (2013) gets his role in the Italian serie My Heaven Will Wait as Frederick Khoner. He also has character parts in European co-productions and in Canada, namely as Lucie Aubrac (directed by Claude Berri), Julius Caesar (directed by Uli Edel), Napoléon (dir.: Yves Simoneau), The Seagull's Laughter (dir: Ágúst Guðmundson), Hunt for Justice (dir.: Charles Binamé) The Trojan Horse – H2O Part II (dir: Charles Binamé) and D´Artagnan et les trois Mousquetaires (dir.: Prierre Aknine) helped to establish the German actor's visibility in an international setting.

Ferch also did voice acting, performing the German dubbing voices for Agent Classified (Benedict Cumberbatch) in The Penguins of Madagascar and Ernesto de la Cruz (Benjamin Bratt) in Coco.

== Selected filmography ==
- 1988: Schloß Königswald - Funker
- 1990: Wedding - Klaus
- 1991: Who's Afraid of Red, Yellow and Blue - Müller
- 1991: Death Came As a Friend (TV film) - Korten
- 1992: All Lies - Representative
- 1993: Gefährliche Verbindung (TV film) - Andy
- 1994: Lauras Entscheidung (TV film) - Galreith
- 1995: Küß mich! - Johannes
- 1996: The Ogre - SS-Officer Raufeisen
- 1997: Life Is All You Get - Hoffmann
- 1997: Lucie Aubrac - Barbie
- 1997: Winter Sleepers - Marco
- 1997: The Harmonists - Roman Cycowski
- 1998: Widows – Erst die Ehe, dann das Vergnügen - Vince Travelli
- 1998: Four for Venice - Nick
- 1998: Run Lola Run - Ronnie
- 1998: Mortal Friends - Max Klausmann
- 1998: Tower of the Firstborn - Léon
- 1999: Straight Shooter - Volker Bretz
- 1999: The Green Desert - Simon
- 2000: Marlene - Carl Seidlitz
- 2000: The Unscarred - Johann
- 2001: Der Tunnel - Harry Melchior
- 2001: The Seagull's Laughter - Björn Theódór
- 2002: At Night in the Park - Steffen Hennings
- 2002: Napoléon (TV miniseries, FR) - Armand de Caulaincourt
- 2002: Extreme Ops - Mark
- 2002: Julius Caesar (TV film, USA, IT, FR) - Vercingetorix
- 2003: A Light in Dark Places (TV film) - Franz Wolbert
- 2004: Downfall - Albert Speer
- 2004: Mord am Meer (TV film) - Anton Glauberg
- 2005: About the Looking for and the Finding of Love - Hermes - Aphrodite
- 2005: D'Artagnan et les trois mousquetaires (TV film, FR) - Athos
- 2005: Hunt for Justice (TV film, CAN) - Keller
- 2005: The Airlift (TV film) - General Philipp Turner
- 2006: Ghetto - Gens
- 2006: Cold Summer (TV film) - Hans Kuhlke
- 2007: The Hunt for Troy (TV film) - Heinrich Schliemann
- 2007: Messy Christmas - Jan Meinhold
- 2008: The Miracle of Berlin (TV film) - Jürgen Kaiser
- 2008: The Trojan Horse (TV film, CAN, US) - Christian Kruse
- 2008: Der Baader Meinhof Komplex - Horst Herold's Assistant
- 2008: The Caesar Code (TV film) - Manuel Aranda
- 2009: Abducted (TV film) - Kommissar Thomas Danner
- 2009: Krupp: A Family Between War and Peace (TV miniseries) - Gustav Krupp von Bohlen und Halbach
- 2009: Vision - Mönch Volmar
- 2010: Jerry Cotton - Klaus Schmidt
- 2010: Kennedy's Brain (TV film) - Dr. Christian Holloway
- 2010: Vincent Wants to Sea - Robert
- 2010: Hanni & Nanni - George Sullivan
- 2010: Max Schmeling - Max Machon
- 2010: In the Jungle (TV film) - Henning Lohmann
- 2010: Life Is Too Long - Professor Mohr
- 2010–2021: Anatomy of Evil (TV series, 9 episodes) - Richard Brock
- 2012: Munich '72 (TV film) - Dieter Waldner
- 2012: Glory: A Tale of Mistaken Identities - Ralf Tanner
- 2012: Hanni & Nanni 2 - George Sullivan
- 2012: Deckname Luna (TV film) - Moll
- 2013: Hotel Adlon: A Family Saga (TV miniseries) - Louis Adlon
- 2013: Where Friendship Ends (TV film) - Peter Staude
- 2013: The Wagner-Clan (TV film) - Houston Stewart Chamberlain
- 2014: Sarajevo - Dr. Herbert Sattler
- 2014: Tigers - Michael
- 2014: Suite Française - Major
- 2014: The Penguins of Madagascar - Agent Classified (voice, German version)
- 2015: Death of a Girl (TV film) - Simon Kessler
- 2015: Mara and the Firebringer - Dr. Thurisaz
- 2015: Unterm Radar (TV film) - Heinrich Buch
- 2016: Fritz Lang - Fritz Lang
- 2016: Conni & Co - Schuldirektor
- 2017: Coco - Ernesto de la Cruz (voice, German version)
- 2018: Hot Dog - Hedmann

== Awards ==
Adolfe Grimme Award

- Adolf Grimme Award for series/miniseries (A Light in Dark Places / Das Wunder von Lengede)

Bambi Awards

- Bambi Award for national film (Downfall)
- Bambi Award for TV event of the year (A Light in Dark Places / Das Wunder von Lengede)

Bavarian Film Awards

- 1997 Special Award (The Harmonists / Comedian Harmonists)

Bavarian TV Awards

- Bavarian TV Award (Der Tunnel)

Golden Camera

- Golden Camera (Der Tunnel)

Jupiter Award

- Jupiter Award (The Wall - Berlin ´61)
