= Hans Werner Meyer =

German actor

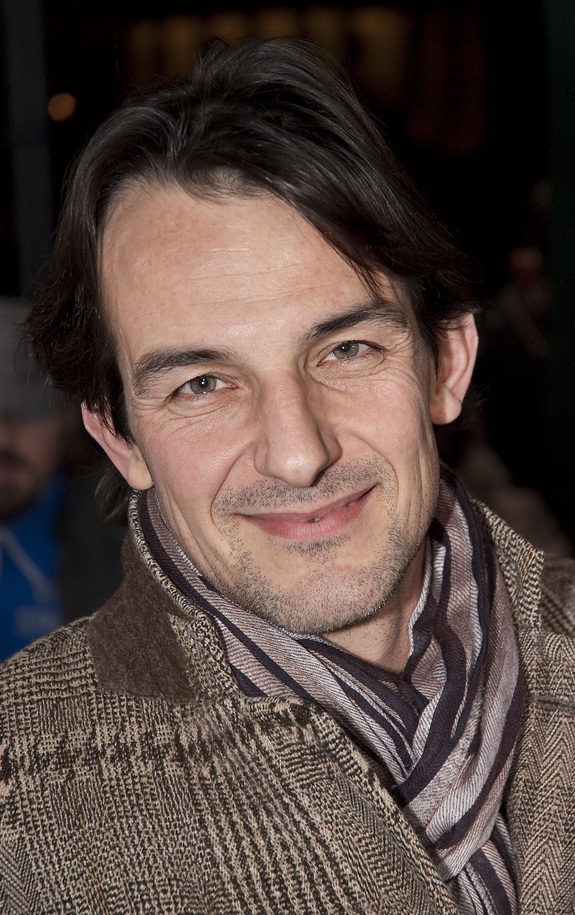
- Hans-Werner Meyer at Berlinale 2008
- Born: Hans Werner Meyer; 14 April 1964 (age 61); Hamburg, West Germany
- Occupation: Actor
- Years active: 1993–present

Hans Werner Meyer (born 14 April 1964 in Hamburg, West Germany) is a German film and television actor.

== Life and career ==
Hans-Werner Meyer attended the Albert Schweitzer Gymnasium in Hamburg. He studied at the School for Music and Theater in Hannover and started his acting career at the Residenztheater in Munich. In 1993 he went to Berlin and worked at the Schaubühne am Lehniner Platz with renowned directors such as Andrea Breth, Luc Bondy, Leander Haußmann, Robert Lepage.

His first film was Charlie & Louise in 1992 directed by Joseph Vilsmaier, followed by more movie and television work. In 1997 Meyer gave up his Schaubühne engagement and mainly concentrated on film and TV work. Meanwhile he has starred or featured in about 80 film or TV productions, among them the 48 episodes of the crime TV series Die Cleveren, with Meyer starring as a police psychologist, for which he was awarded the Bavarian TV award. In 2000 and 2001 he was a nominee for the German TV award.

In the following years his roles became more and more versatile, comprising diverse characters, such as long distance runner Dieter Baumann in Ich will laufen – der Fall Dieter Baumann (English: “I want to run – the case of Dieter Baumann”) or the son of a Prussian Officer, Albrecht Sterenberg, who slowly develops insanity in the historical two-part TV production Platinum. He also acted as Thomas Menz, a loser suffering from posttraumatic stress disorder in Doppelter Einsatz – Fluch des Feuers .

Meyer published his first audio book "Spider" in 2007 and was awarded the "Ohrkanus Award".

Since April 2006 Meyer has been an honorary board member of the German actors’ trade union Bundesverband der Film- und Fernsehschauspieler.

Hans Werner Meyer is married to the British actress Jacqueline Macaulay.

== Selected filmography ==
=== Movies ===
- 1993: Charlie & Louise – Das doppelte Lottchen
- 1994: Der Schatten des Schreibers
- 1996: Busenfreunde
- 1997: Ende des Frühlings
- 1998: Marlene
- 2000: Laissez-Passer
- 2006: Lapislazuli: In the Eyes of the Bear
- 2008: Der Baader Meinhof Komplex
- 2009: Albert Schweitzer
- 2010: Someone Like Him
- 2013: Adieu Paris

=== Television ===
- 1997: It Happened in Broad Daylight
- 1997: Schimanski: Blutsbrüder
- 1998: Hauptsache Leben
- 1998–2006: Die Cleveren (TV series)
- 1999: Gefährliche Wahrheit
- 2000: Und morgen geht die Sonne wieder auf
- 2000: Vera Brühne
- 2001: Liebe darf alles
- 2001: Tatort: Gute Freunde
- 2002: An Unusual Affair
- 2003: Two Days of Hope
- 2004: Platinum
- 2004: Ich will laufen – Der Fall Dieter Baumann
- 2004: Doppelter Einsatz: Der Fluch des Feuers
- 2005: Was für ein schöner Tag
- 2006: Prager Botschaft
- 2007: Contergan
- 2007: Ich leih' mir eine Familie
- 2008: The Secret of Loch Ness
- 2008: Mordshunger
- 2008: The Wall: The Final Days
- 2010: Das zweite Wunder von Loch Ness
- 2011: Die Schäferin
- 2011: Beate Uhse
- 2012: Kennen Sie Ihren Liebhaber?
- 2013: Kleine Schiffe
