= Christiane Paul =

German actress (born 1974)

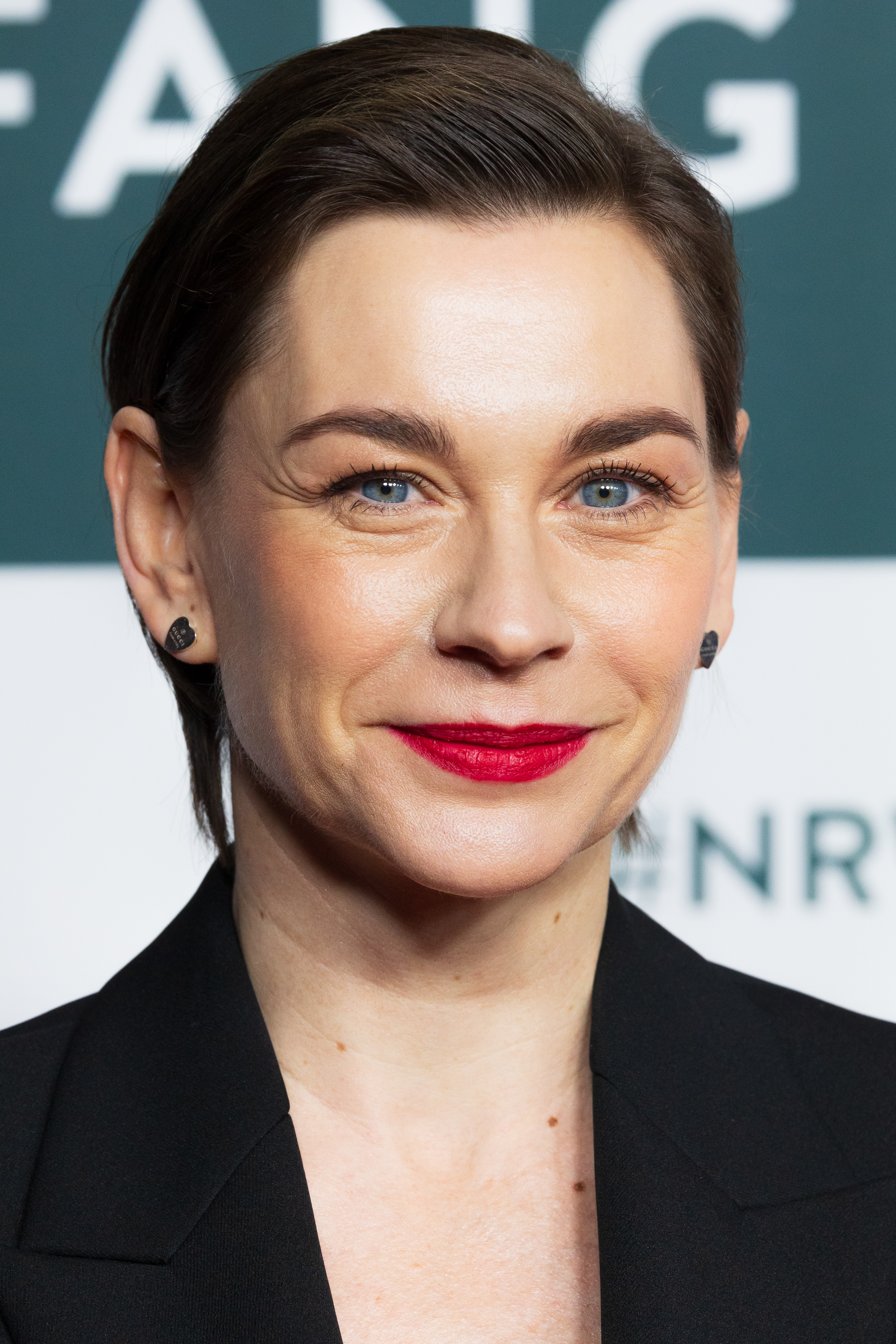
- Christiane Paul at a premiere in Cologne, 2023
- Born: 8 March 1974 (age 52); Pankow, East Berlin, East Germany
- Education: Humboldt University of Berlin
- Occupation: Actor
- Years active: 1992–present
- Spouses: Wolfgang Schwenk (m. 2002; div. 2006) undisclosed (m. 2016)
- Children: 2
- Website: www.christianepaul.de

Christiane Paul (German: [kʁɪsˈti̯a.nə paʊ̯l]; born 8 March 1974) is a German film, television and stage actress.

== Career ==
Paul first worked as a model for magazines such as Bravo. She was 17 when she obtained her first leading role in the film Border Frenzy. Prior to her acting career (she has no formal acting training), she studied medicine and successfully completed her studies at the Humboldt University of Berlin; however, she gave up medicine in 2006.

== Personal life ==
Paul was married to physician Prof. Dr. Wolfgang Schwenk from 2002 to 2006. She has a son with Schwenk and a daughter from a previous relationship. Since January 2016, Paul has been married to a German physicist and lives with him in Berlin.

== Filmography ==
(This is a selection, for the full list see Christiane Paul at IMDb)

Film
Year	Title	Role	Director	Notes
1992	Border Frenzy	Sascha	Niklaus Schilling	
1993	Me and Christine	Christine	Peter Stripp	
1995	Ex	Sarah	Mark Schlichter	
1996	Under the Milky Way		Matthias X. Oberg	
1996	Workaholic	Rhoda Tramitz	Sharon von Wietersheim	
1997	Knockin' on Heaven's Door	Boutique attendant	Thomas Jahn	
1997	Life Is All You Get	Vera	Wolfgang Becker	
1997	Gone Wrong	Sabrina Rotenbacher	Peter Timm	
1999	Tails You Win, Heads You Lose	Cora	Hans-Günther Bücking	
2000	Marlene	Tamara Matul	Joseph Vilsmaier	
2000	Trust Me	Caro	Martin Eigler	
2000	In July	Juli	Fatih Akın	
2002	I'm the Father	Ilona	Dani Levy	
2003	Echte Männer?	Sophie	Christian Zübert	
2006	No Sweat	Nadinchen Molinski	Eoin Moore	
2006	A Mere Formality	Pola	Ralf Huettner	
2007	Neues vom Wixxer	Victoria Dickham	Cyrill Boss, Philipp Stennert	
2007	Vorne ist verdammt weit weg	Chantal	Thomas Heinemann	
2008	The Wave	Anke Wenger	Dennis Gansel	
2009	The Dust of Time	Helga	Theo Angelopoulos	
2010	The Day of the Cat	Dr. Bässler	Wolfgang Panzer	
2010	Jerry Cotton	Zanuck	Cyrill Boss, Philipp Stennert	
2012	Vampire Sisters	Elvira Tepes	Wolfgang Groos	
2013	Parents	Christine	Robert Thalheim	
2016	Wunderlich's World	Manuela Wunderlich	Dani Levy	

TV
Year	Title	Role	Director	Notes
1995	Nur der Sieg zählt	Claudia Schumacher	Uwe Janson	
1998	Der Pirat	Meike	Bernd Schadewald	
1998	Sugar for the Beast	Tanja Krieger	Markus Fischer	
1998	Mammamia	Paula	Sandra Nettelbeck	
1999	Bombs Under Berlin	Sandra Fechtner	Joe Coppoletta	
2002	Himmelreich auf Erden	Julie Stiller	Torsten C. Fischer	
2005	Außer Kontrolle	Lisa Korff	Christian Görlitz	
2005	A Witch's Kiss	Karla	Diethard Küster	
2005	The Night of the Great Flood	Gerda Brandt	Raymond Ley	
2006	Die Tote vom Deich	Lona Vogt	Matti Geschonneck	
2007	Ein verlockendes Angebot	Maria Werther	Tim Trageser	
2011	Hindenburg: The Last Flight	Anna Kerner	Philipp Kadelbach	
2011	Ein mörderisches Geschäft	Alina Liebermann	Martin Eigler	
2013	Hotel Adlon: A Family Saga	Undine Adams	Uli Edel	
2013	Generation War	Lilija	Philipp Kadelbach	TV miniseries
2013	Heroes	Sophie Ritter	Hansjörg Thurn	
2015	After the Fall	Anna Roth	Carlo Rola	
2015	Unterm Radar	Elke Seeberg	Elmar Fischer	
2016	Paranoid	Linda Felber	Mark Tonderai	TV miniseries
2018	Counterpart	Mira	Alik Sakharov	TV series, 9 episodes
2020	Parlement	Ingeborg	Noé Debré	TV series, 10 episodes
2021–2022, 2023, 2025	FBI: International	Europol Agent Katrin Jaeger		TV series, 23 episodes
2026	Hijack	Chief Ada Winter, head of the Federal Police, Berlin Division	Jim Field Smith; Mo Ali	TV series, 8 episodes

== Audiobooks (selection) ==
Read by Christiane Paul:

- Kafka Collection von Franz Kafka, Christiane Paul liest die Erzählung Kinder auf der Landstraße. Patmos audio 2008, ISBN 978-3-491-91260-1.
- Am Weihnachtsabend – Die schönsten Geschichten zum Fest. Christiane Paul liest die Erzählung Die Fähre. von Joan Aiken, Patmos audio 2007, ISBN 978-3-491-91248-9.
- Halbnackte Bauarbeiter. von Martina Brandl, Patmos audio 06/2007, ISBN 978-3-491-91247-2.
- Im Dunkel der Wälder. von Brigitte Aubert, Patmos audio 03/2007, ISBN 978-3-491-91229-8.
- Reliquienblut und Gottesurteil. von Rebecca Gablé, Der Hörverlag 2006, ISBN 3-89940-837-3.
- Sigmund Freud: Krankengeschichten, die wie Novellen zu lesen sind. Der Hörverlag 2006, ISBN 3-89940-838-1.
- Für immer verzaubert - Die schönsten Prinzessinnen – Geschichten. von Martina Patzer (Hrsg.), Cbj Verlag 2006, ISBN 3-86604-097-0.
- Morpheus. von Jilliane Hoffman, Argon Verlag 2005, ISBN 3-87024-093-8.
- Wie es leuchtet. von Thomas Brussig, Roof Music 2005, ISBN 3-936186-85-5.
- Hans Christian Andersen: Märchen. Hörcompany 2004, ISBN 3-935036-60-4.
- Alice im Wunderland. von Lewis Carroll, Roof Music 2003, ISBN 3-936186-26-X.
- Die Gesetze. von Connie Palmen, Roof Music 2002, ISBN 3-936186-06-5.
- Sandmännchens Geschichtenbuch. von Gina Ruck-Pauquèt, Der Audio Verlag 2009, ISBN 978-3-89813-873-4.
- Sandmännchens Geschichtenbuch 2. von Gina Ruck-Pauquèt, Der Audio Verlag 2009, ISBN 978-3-89813-902-1.
- Puck der Zwerg. von Jakob Streit, Sauerländer audio 2010, ISBN 978-3-7941-8506-1.
- Die Lieblingsmärchen der Deutschen. von den Brüdern Grimm und Hans Christian Andersen, Christiane Paul liest drei Märchen, Patmos audio 2010, ISBN 978-3-491-91312-7.

== Bibliography ==
- Paul, Christiane. Einflussfaktoren auf die perioperative Morbidität und Mortalität in der primären Hüftendoprothetik: eine retrospektive, fallkontrollierte, unselektierte Studie über 628 Implantationen. Dissertation, Humboldt University of Berlin, 2002.

== Awards ==
- Max-Ophüls-Preis for Ex – 1996
- Bayerischer Filmpreis for Workaholik – 1996
- Goldene Kamera as Best Upcoming Actress – 1998
- Telestar nominated for Best Actress - 1998
- Berliner Bär Zeitung Culture prize – 1999
- TV-film festival Baden-Baden as Best Actress for Unterm Radar - 2015
- International Emmy Award as best actress for lead role in Unterm Radar - 2016
- German Academy Award nominated as Best Supporting Actress - 2017
- Order of Merit of the Federal Republic of Germany - 2017
