= Vera Brühne =

German woman accused of murder (1910–2001)

Vera Brühne (February 6, 1910 in Essen – April 17, 2001 in Munich) became famous throughout Germany as a victim of miscarriage of justice. In 1961/62, she was convicted, together with Johann Ferbach, of having murdered the physician Otto Praun and his housekeeper.

Ulrich Sonnemann considered the case as a new Dreyfus affair. In 1979, she was pardoned by Bavarian governor Franz Josef Strauss.

== Dramatization ==
- Vera Brühne (2001), film
