= Die Cleveren =

German television series

- Starring: Hans Werner Meyer
- Opening theme: Crime
- Country of origin: Germany
- No. of seasons: 6
- No. of episodes: 48

Production
- Running time: 43 minutes

Original release
- Network: RTL
- Release: 1998 – 2006

Die Cleveren (English: The Smart Ones) is a German television series that was produced from 1998 to 2003 on RTL. It is about a nationwide special unit of the German Bundeskriminalamt (BKA), dealing with serial offenders. The main characters are the profiler Dr. Dominik Born and a policewoman of the BKA, who co-ordinates the necessary steps to be taken by the local police authorities.

== Cast ==
- Dr. Dominik Born (Hans Werner Meyer): is a profiler in the service of the BKA. With his career he has fulfilled a childhood dream, yet he sometimes suffers greatly from his work. He was previously married to Helen Born, the marriage was divorced and his wife moved to Munich with their son Philip. In the beginning of the fourth season, he and his colleague Eva Glaser start a relationship. After her tragic death, he nearly commits suicide and stops his service to the BKA. The police officer Isabel Becker persuaded the now alcohol-addicted Born to return. He's in a monastery on detoxification and wants to lead a normal life again at the end of the fifth season. In Episode 6 # 01 On the run, he finds Isabel Becker murdered in a hotel room and is blamed for a sudden whole series of murders. Hunted by the BKA official Katrin he quickly tries to prove his innocence, the two then team on.
- Eva Glaser (Astrid M. Fünderich): is the first woman police officer to search for serial offenders with Dominik Born. She is Detective Chief Commissioner of the BKA and starts an affair with Born in the fourth season. The two lovers try to arrest a psychopath, supported police officer Isabel Becker. In an attempt to arrest the perpetrator, Eva Glaser is seriously injured by a bullet and dies later in hospital.
- Prof. Konstanze Korda (Barbara Magdalena Ahren): is a medical examiner and supports the Serial Crimes special Unit. She is one of the best in their profession, always expensively dressed and a chain smoker. She is widowed. To Glaser, she has a rather cool relationship, but appreciates her work. She has a special relationship to Born and supports him when he is suspected to have shot Isabel Becker.
- Isabel Becker (Delia Mayer) appears for the first time in Episode 4 # 05 The Goddess - Part 1 as a supporting officer. After Eva Glaser’s death she takes over her position and takes care of the mentally ailing Born. She can prevent him from committing suicide, and persuades him to return to his job in the police force. Isabel Becker is married and has two children. Her family’ support gives strength for her police work . In Episode 6 # 01 On the run she is killed and Born is wrongly suspected of having killed her.
- Katrin Rasch (Esther Schweins), who is unmarried, is a detective chief commissioner of the BKA and first appears at the beginning of season six. She suspects Dominik Born of being a murderer and tries everything to convict him, but she cannot. When Born succeeds in convincing her of his innocence he and Katrin become a team. Their relationship is somewhat distant, determined by common sense and purpose.

== Broadcast ==
The pilot was a ninety-minute telefilm broadcast on March 10, 1998, which was more than eighteen months before the regular first season in November 1999.

On 30 April 2003 the series came to an end after the fifth season. It took about three years until the sixth season was shown. RTL had already completed eight new episodes in 2003, which they kept in the archives until September 2000, then they were aired in a twin pack. RTL said that no sequel was planned, but there is the option to continue the series in an irregular series of films.

== See also ==
- List of German television series
- List of all episodes and actors (in German) in the German article here
