= Das Boot (2018 TV series) =

German television series

- Cast
- Genre: War
- Created by: Johannes W. Betz; Tony Saint
- Based on: Das Boot and Die Festung by Lothar-Günther Buchheim
- Written by: Benedikt Röskau; Colin Teevan; Johannes W. Betz; Judith Angerbauer; Laura Grace; Matthias Glasner; Simon Allen; Tim Loane; Tony Saint
- Directed by: Andreas Prochaska; Dennis Gansel; Hans Steinbichler; Matthias Glasner; Rick Ostermann
- Composer: Matthias Weber
- Country of origin: Germany
- Original languages: German; English; French; Italian; Portuguese
- No. of seasons: 4
- No. of episodes: 32 (list of episodes)

Production
- Executive producers: Moritz Polter; Oliver Vogel; Jan S. Kaiser; Marcus Ammon; Frank Jastfelder; Jenna Santoianni
- Producers: Caroline Fischer; Judith Niemeyer; Sebastian Rybing; Nick Shuttleworth
- Production locations: Czech Republic; Malta; United Kingdom
- Cinematography: Armin Franzen
- Production companies: Bavaria Fiction; Sky Studios; Samsung, in corporation (from s. 3); Sonar Entertainment (s. 1)

Original release
- Network: Sky One
- Release: 23 November 2018 – October 7, 2023

Related
- Das Boot

Das Boot is a German television series produced by Bavaria Fiction for Sky One and a sequel to the film of the same name, based on Lothar-Günther Buchheim's book Die Festung, the series focuses on events on land and sea in World War II.

== Plot ==
In late 1942, a mutiny occurs on U-612 against Captain Klaus Hoffmann, while French Resistance in La Rochelle recruit German translator Simone Strasser. In 1943, Captain von Reinhartz attempts to defect to America on U-822, while Hoffmann's loyalty to Germany is divided. The war continues to exert its forces on unexpected territories, neutral Portugal and Kiel, while Royal Navy Commander Swinburne pursues U-949 in the Atlantic. Opposition to Adolf Hitler gains strength from within the Kriegsmarine, and Hoffmann's conviction to save Germany takes U-330 in the thick of the Allied invasion of Italy.

== Cast ==
Introduced in season 1

- August Wittgenstein as Oberleutnant zur See (1WO) Karl Tennstedt (seasons 1–2)
- Ben Münchow as Maschinengefreiter Lutz Rizenhoff (season 1)
- Clara Ponsot as Nathalie (season 1)
- Fleur Geffrier as Margot Bostal (seasons 1–2)
- Franz Dinda as Oberleutnant zur See and Leitender Ingenieur (LI) Robert Ehrenberg
- James D'Arcy as Philip Sinclair (season 1)
- Joachim Foerster as Elektro-Maschinenmaat Ralf Grothe (seasons 1–2)
- Julius Feldmeier as Obersteuermann Eugen Strelitz (seasons 1–2)
- Kevin McNally as Jack Greenwood (seasons 1–2)
- Klaus Steinbacher as Obermechanikermaat Josef Wolf (season 1)
- Leon Blaschke as Torpedogast Thorsten Hecker (seasons 1–2)
- Leonard Kunz as Bootsmann Günther Maas (seasons 1, 4)
- Leonard Scheicher as Oberfunkmaat Frank Strasser (seasons 1–2)
- Lizzy Caplan as Carla Monroe (season 1)
- Olivier Chantreau as Émile Charpentier (season 1)
- Philip Birnstiel as Leutnant zur See (2WO) Benno Schiller (seasons 1–2)
- Pit Bukowski as Obermaschinenmaat Pips Lüders (seasons 1–2)
- Rafael Gareisen as Mechanikerobergefreiter Max von Haber (seasons 1–2)
- Rainer Bock as Fregattenkapitän Heinrich Gluck
- Rick Okon as Kapitänleutnant (Kaleun) Klaus Hoffmann
- Robert Stadlober as Oberfähnrich and Ingenieur (Ing) Hinrich Laudrup (seasons 1–2)
- Stefan Konarske as Korvettenkapitän Ulrich Wrangel (seasons 1–2)
- Thierry Frémont as Inspector Pierre Duval (seasons 1–2)
- Tom Wlaschiha as Kriminalrat Hagen Forster (seasons 1–3)
- Vicky Krieps as Marinehelferin Simone Strasser (seasons 1–2)
- Vincent Kartheiser as Samuel Greenwood (seasons 1–2)

Introduced in season 2

- Clemens Schick as Korvettenkapitän Johannes von Reinhartz (season 2)
- Dimitrij Schaad as SS-Standartenführer Gustav Eckermann (season 2)
- Joseph Konrad Bundschuh as Leutnant zur See (2WO) Julius Fischer (season 2)
- Michael McElhatton as Deputy chief Thomas O'Leary (season 2)
- Paul Bartel as Gestapo auxiliary officer Anatole Desjesquier (season 2)
- Rochelle Neil as Cassandra Lloyd (season 2)
- Thomas Kretschmann as Friedrich Berger (season 2)
- Ulrich Matthes as Kapitän zur See Wilhelm Hoffmann (season 2)

Introduced in season 3

- Alessandro Schuster as Steuermann Pauli Müller (seasons 3–4)
- Aniol Kirberg as Funkgast Harry Weidner (season 3)
- Anna Schudt as Bettina Gruber (seasons 3–4)
- Artjom Gilz as Oberleutnant zur See (1WO) Alois Erdmann (seasons 3–4)
- Elisa Schlott as Greta Nussmeier (season 3)
- Ernst Stötzner as Kapitän zur See a.D. Wilhelm Hoffmann (seasons 3–4)
- Florian Panzner as Fregattenkapitän Albrecht Lessing (seasons 3–4)
- Franz Hartwig as Oberleutnant zur See and Leitender Ingenieur (LI) Rudi Vogts (season 3)
- Julius Nitschkoff as Obermaschinenmaat Öli Meierjohann (season 3)
- Laurids Schürmann as Matrose Willi Niedermeier (season 3)
- Fritzi Haberlandt as Ulrike Buchner (season 3)
- Jo Hartley as Daisy Swinburne (season 3)
- John Schwab as Lt Commander Tom Gardiner (season 3)
- Joana Ribeiro as Inês de Pina (season 3)
- Johann von Bülow as Gustav Gruber (seasons 3–4)
- Konstantin Gries as Kapitänleutnant Franz Buchner (seasons 3–4)
- Luise Wolfram as Hannie Hoffmann Lessing (season 3)
- Pierre Kiwitt as Korvettenkapitän Robert Schulz (seasons 3–4)
- Ray Stevenson as Commander Jack Swinburne (season 3)
- Samuel Valentine as Lt Commander David Mercer (season 3)
- Coalan Byrne as Lieutenant Mick Walsh (season 3)
- Simon Licht as SS-Obersturmbannführer Koch (seasons 3–4)
- Trystan Pütter as Reinhard Weiss (season 3)
- Yuri Völsch as Maschinengast Bernd Cremer (seasons 3–4)

Introduced in season 4

- Anne-Kathrin Gummrich as Mathilde Schorlau (season 4)
- Benjamin Schroeder as Oberleutnant zur See Matthias Breitner (season 4)
- Frederic Linkemann as SS-Gruppenführer Tobias Werner (season 4)
- Jakub Horak as Obersteuermann Bischof (season 4)
- Joshua Collins as Private First Class Clifford P. MacKenzie (season 4)
- Kai Maertens as Konteradmiral Kreutzer (season 4)
- Lara Mandoki as Dagmar DeWitt (season 4)
- Marco Leonardi as Sal "Toto" Giuliano (season 4)
- Roberto Thoenelt as SS-Oberscharführer Jäger (season 4)
- Rosalie Thomass as Hannie Hoffmann Lessing (season 4)
- Sascha Alexander Geršak as Oberbootsmannmaat Otto Rahn (season 4)
- Simon Rußig as Matrose Carsten (season 4)
- Stefan Murr as Konteradmiral Lothar (season 4)
- Steffan Rhodri as Admiral George Kenton (season 4)
- Sven Daniel Bühler as Mechanikermaat Röhrle (season 4)
- Waldemar Kobus as Vizeadmiral Knappertsbusch (season 4)
- Wilson Gonzalez Ochsenknecht as Funkgast Nudel (season 4)

== Episodes ==
Series	Episodes	Originally released	
Series	Episodes	First released	Last released
1	8	23 November 2018	14 December 2018
2	8	24 April 2020	15 May 2020
3	10	14 May 2022	11 June 2022
4	6	22 September 2023	22 September 2023

=== Season 1 (2018) ===
No. overall	No. in season	Title	English title	Directed by	Written by	Original release date
1	1	"Neue Wege"	"New Paths"	Andreas Prochaska	Tony Saint	23 November 2018 (Note: All episodes of the first season were released on 23 November 2018 on Sky Go, Sky On Demand and Sky Ticket, ahead of their broadcast on television.)
U-113 receives an air attack, and Captain Wrangel goes overboard whilst the boat dives, and is sunk by depth charge. In La Rochelle, U-612 prepares for its first patrol under the inexperienced Captain Klaus Hoffmann, who gives evidence at the court-martial of a submariner accused of cowardice in the face of the enemy. At the execution, he performs a mercy killing. Simone Strasser arrives from Alsace to work at the Police HQ and billets with nurse Margot Bostal. The night before leave, the crew visit a brothel and try to get Mechanikergast Thorsten Hecker to lose his virginity with a prostitute, as it is considered bad luck to have a virgin on board. Diesel-Maschinenmaat Pips Lüders gets into fight after a game of cards. Inspector Pierre Duval wants to detain him but Lüders says he can give him information to avoid this happening. A fire in the radio room requires Frank Strasser, Simone's brother, to stay on board. Frank asks Simone to pass a document on to a member of the French resistance; Frank is involved with them. The meeting ends when police arrive, Duval having been tipped off. Simone evades capture with help by a priest.
2	2	"Geheime Missionen"	"Secret Missions"	Andreas Prochaska	Johannes Betz	23 November 2018
Bostal's boss, Gestapo inspector Hagan Forster, asks Simone to interpret as he interrogates Frank's contact, Jacqueline. Forster is unaware of Simone's involvement. On U-612, Hoffmann irritates his crew, in particular adjutant Oberleutnant zur See Karl Tennstedt, by making them perform drills. He further annoys them by aborting an attack when he receives orders to go on a secret mission, ordered directly by Goebbels, Forster having advised Fregattenkapitän Gluck to choose Hoffmann as it would be risking a less experienced captain. Simone, in Frank's flat, finds photos of Frank and a young woman called Nathalie who works behind the bar in a local brothel and visits her. Carla, the leader of the local French resistance cell, visits Simone and pressures her into giving Jacqueline morphine so she can overdose and kill herself before she can talk. Police HQ is evacuated during an air raid and Simone uses this chance to get the morphine to Jacqueline but has to administer it. U-612 reaches a supply ship to pick up an American passenger, Samuel Greenwood, before Allied aircraft attack and a crewman is mortally wounded.
3	3	"Verluste"	"Casualties"	Andreas Prochaska	Tony Saint	30 November 2018
On U-612, Tennstedt expresses his dislike for Hoffmann, particualy how Hoffmann has benefitted from having a famous U-boat commander as his father. The crew spread rumours that Greenwood is Jewish, that Hoffmann shot the court-martialled submariner in cold blood and that two U-boats were lost in the attack. Greenwood, brash and over-familiar, irritates the officers but later is more circumspect after seeing Mechanikergefreiter Matthias Loidl lose his arm in an accident while loading the torpedo and the sinking of a ship. In La Rochelle, Simone follows Nathalie back to her house and discovers she has had a child with Frank, is Jewish and has a forged identity. Simone shows her the document which she was supposed to pass onto Jacqueline; it is the circuit diagram for the radio on the U-boat and it was to be exchanged for forged passports for Frank and Nathalie. Carla brings Simone to their hideout and ascertains what happened to Jacqueline and gives Simone the passports; Simone warns Carla that Forster is aware of her. Carla vows to take her revenge and bombs the welcoming parade for another U-boat. At the brothel, Nathalie is raped by a submariner.
4	4	"Zweifel"	"Doubts"	Andreas Prochaska	Benedikt Röskau	30 November 2018
As reprisal for the bombing, the German High Command orders Gluck to execute French citizens. The mayor is asked which names to place on the list of people to be shot. Gluck assures a distraught Forster that no-one else will die if the perpetrators are found. At Margot's request, Simone visits Nathalie in the hospital and finds her with head and abdominal injuries. On U-612, Mechanikerobergefreiter Max von Haber is revealed to have come from a wealthy background and dropped out of officer training school to be of a lower rank. This creates further resentment in the men, who already blame Haber for Loidl's injury and beat him. They arrive at their rendezvous for handing over Greenwood but as he is about to leave he insults Tennstedt, who punches him overboard. On the American ship, Greenwood's father reveals a prisoner to be exchanged, Wrangel. He was picked up by the Americans. Greenwood tells Hoffmann that it is a trap, with two US destroyers on their way. On the U-boat, Wrangel tries to exert his authority over Hoffmann by suggesting he torpedo the American ship. However, Hoffmann refuses as they handed over Loidl so he can be cared for.
5	5	"Loyalität"	"Loyalty"	Andreas Prochaska	Laura Grace	7 December 2018
After her encounter with Carla, Simone passes on the diagram from Frank to the resistance. On U-612, Hoffmann falls ill. Wrangel takes over as captain and reinstates Tennstedt. After resisting, Strasser and Bootsmann Günther Mann are detained. Hoffmann challenges Wrangel, whom the officers support. Hoffmann will be placed overboard in a dinghy with provisions. Hoffmann addresses the men and calls them mutineers, Max Von Haber declares his support for Hoffmann. In La Rochelle, Nathalie dies and Simone informs Margot about the child. Englishman Philip Sinclair, who fought with Carla in the International Brigade during the Spanish Civil War, visits the cell. Sinclair asks Carla to re-think her strategies and attack non-human targets if she wishes to continue to receive support from Britain. Forster and Duval discover that the bomb had a timing device stolen from a factory time-clock. A time-clock was stolen from an iron foundry two weeks before. U-612 comes across ships which Wrangel decides to attack without following protocol. Tennstedt realises that Wrangel has a death wish; he sets the boat on course with a destroyer. Sonar pings increase in frequency.
6	6	"Gegen die Zeit"	"Nick of Time"	Andreas Prochaska	Simon Allen	7 December 2018
Depth charges damage U-612, which grounds on the sea-bed of the Laura Ethel Bank. Tennstedt retires to his bunk; Ehrenberg is forced to take command. There is an air leak and the batteries are damaged. The resistance cell learns from Britain that weapons are to arrive by sea. Carla asks Simone to investigate the German patrol boat times. Simone and Margot visit Nathalie's mother. The baby (Anna) has pneumonia. On U-612, the men start repairing air leaks. Hecker admits to Obermechanikermaat Josef Wolf that he did not have sex with a prostitute the night before the U-boat sailed. Because of the sustained damage, chlorine gas begins escaping. Lüders and Haas return with breathing equipment but a cell explodes and they cannot repair the damage. Fixing the damage alone, Tennstedt dies. Forster and Duval question the porter who works at the iron foundry and get the name of the person he helped acquire the time-clock. They then threaten his family, and he leads them to the cell safe house. Simone, who was interpreting for the porter, cycles to the cell to warn them and begins removing evidence. The Germans arrive and begin shooting, killing a resistance member. Simone hides. The weapons arrive by sea. Sinclair and Carla collect them and drive to the safe house. There, they exchange fire with the Germans. Sinclair dies but Carla escapes. Simone arrives at home to find Carla already there, before Forster appears and forces himself on Simone. As they have sex, Carla declines to kill Forster.
7	7	"Verdammt"	"Damned"	Andreas Prochaska	Johannes Betz	14 December 2018
At the hospital, Duval tells Margot that she is on the list of hostages. A piece of paper that Simone used to write down the patrol times is found at the safe house and handed to Forster. On U-612, the diesel is getting low, as the crew head for the French coast, hoping to find a German ship. Strasser suggests that they could alter the log to fabricate a cover story. In La Rochelle, Carla is suffering withdrawal symptoms and asks Simone to get more morphine. Gluck informs Forster that U-612 is missing and that he should inform Simone. On U-612, an SOS signal is picked up from a seemingly abandoned ship. Wrangel resumes command and leads some men onto the ship. The ship's German captain claims that their machinist went mad and destroyed the engine. Wrangel arranges that if Lüders can fix it, they can have diesel. Hecker finds a girl chained up and rapes her, thinking that his virginity is creating bad luck. Wrangel ascertains that the Captain is not who he says he is, accuses him of desertion and shoots him. The rest of the ship's crew are killed and Wolf also dies. Jewish refugees are found in the hull in filthy conditions. Two of them, the girl's parents, ask Strasser to give them his gun so they can kill themselves. After the men return to the U-boat, the ship is torpedoed and sunk. Carla is at resistance member Emile Charpentier's farm. They kidnap Gluck. On learning about her brother, Simone asks Margot to leave with Anna and gives her the forged passport that Nathalie was to use. Forster receives a note from the resistance confirming Gluck's capture. He orders the round-up of the 100 hostages plus another 50 for the shooting of his adjutant. Back at Police HQ, he compares the writing on the note with the patrol times to see that it is Simone's writing.
8	8	"Abrechnung"	"Reckoning"	Andreas Prochaska	Tony Saint	14 December 2018
Duval concludes that the resistance must have someone on the inside; Forster suspects Simone. The hostages are rounded up. On U-612, officers begin to forge entries in the ship's log, under the guise of Hoffman. In La Rochelle, Simone persuades Margot to escape with Frank's child, then leaves a note informing the whereabouts of the resistance cell at Charpentier's farm. A patrol carries out a surprise attack on the farm and Charpentier, his father, and Forster kills Carla. Gluck is freed but Forster still orders the killing of five hostages, as a warning to prevent further resistance attacks. U-612 arrives in La Rochelle, and Gluck is sceptical of the logbook story, but Wrangel persuades him to overlook his doubts. Simone ambushes Forster at her home with a gun. She reveals she had sex with Carla. Forster disarms her, and tries to rape Simone, who stabs him in the thigh. She helps apply a tourniquet to his leg. Frank later reunites with Simone. Margot escapes with Frank's baby. Forster recovers and decides not to shoot any more hostages. In the office of Greenwood in New York, Hoffmann, who is alive, visits him.

=== Season 2 (2020) ===
No. overall	No. in season	Title	English title	Directed by	Written by	Original release date
9	1	"Überlebensstrategien"	"Survival Strategies"	Matthias Glasner	Colin Teevan	24 April 2020 (Note: "Überlebensstrategien" was first streamed online on Sky.de on 21 April 2020.) (Note: All episodes of the second season were released on 24 April 2020 on Sky Go, Sky Q and Sky Ticket/Sky X, ahead of their broadcast on television.)
U-822 Lt Commander Johannes von Reinhartz torpedoes a cargo vessel. The victims include women and children. He is forced to avoid a destroyer by diving beneath the survivors. In La Rochelle, Margot returns from Marseille as a Resistance member. She gives Simone the address of the orphanage where Anna is being cared for. Frank looks for his daughter but is arrested for desertion and then reprieved. A Christmas dinner for the heroes of the Kriegsmarine is celebrated. Receiving new orders to depart for New York, Reinhartz sees a chance to defect and writes to his wife. Joining U-822 are former crewmates of U-612 Schiller, Strelitz, Laudrup and Frank; their passengers, SS officers Friedel, Salz and Freund. At a night club in Harlem, Hoffmann meets German-born lawyer Frederich Berger and Cassandra Lloyd, a jazz singer and Sam Greenwood's girlfriend. In La Rochelle, Anatole Desjesquier gives Forster the name of the German who is hiding escaped Jews. Forster asks Simone to organise a unit to round up the Jews after sundown. At the hiding place, the troops arrive as Margot helps the family escape. Simone stays behind with a gun to cover them but is shot. Forster observes her mortally wounded.
10	2	"Unbequeme Allianzen"	"Inconvenient Alliances"	Matthias Glasner	Tim Loane	24 April 2020
Margot takes David Goldblatt and his children to hide in the cathedral crypt until they can travel to Saint-Rémy. At the hospital, Forster orders the doctor not to give Simone morphine. Ehrenberg comes clean about the Hoffmann mutiny to Gluck. The U-612 crew and Wrangel are arrested. Gluck berates the crew for sticking by to what is recorded in the logbook. Wrangel rebukes him for trusting the word of a recovering alcoholic. In New York, Hoffmann asks for Berger's help to return to Germany. Forster learns that Reinhartz intends to hand over the U-boat and its Enigma machine to the Americans. He suggests sending Wrangel after him. Gluck orders Ehrenberg to recant his allegations and admit to being drunk when he made them. On U-822, the crew welcome in the year 1943. In the radio room, a message comes through, ordering Reinhartz to return to La Rochelle. Frank hands it to Reinhartz, who lets him in on his plans to defect. They contemplate sabotaging the radio to break contact with Lorient. The U-612 crew and Wrangel are released, Ralf and Pips torture Ehrenberg. Alcohol is eventually forced down his throat.
11	3	"Sabotage"	"Sabotage"	Matthias Glasner	Laura Grace, Colin Teevan	1 May 2020
On U-612, Wrangel's officers are not correctly following orders. Taking it out on Ehrenberg, Wrangel instructs Ralf to allow him only one shot of alcohol per day. On U-822, Frank sabotages the radio. When Kraushaar arrives for his shift and turns the wavelength dial, the radio catches fire. He accuses Frank of sabotage and deliberately ignoring a message from Lorient. Reinhartz dismisses his allegations and removes him from radio duties. Friedel shows the SS officers a suitcase of dynamite that will be used to blow up the naval base in Virginia. In Gluck's office, Forster brings news that Hoffmann is still alive and in New York. In the Greenwoods' office, Sam threatens Hoffmann to make him divulge information about German radar technology. Hoffmann says that Germany was anticipating British development of aircraft radars (ASV) that could detect periscopes. Near Saint-Rémy, Duval warns Desjesquier not to trust Forster. Margot reveals that her husband died at Dunkirk. She and David look for a place for Elias, David's sick son, to recuperate. Approaching a farmhouse, they find a man hanging from a tree. Desjesquier placed him there as a warning to the Resistance. Margot and David stop at the house.
12	4	"Die Würfel sind gefallen"	"The Dice Have Fallen"	Matthias Glasner	Matthias Glasner	1 May 2020
U-822 stops in a "safe zone". An enemy aircraft appears and opens fire, killing six men. Reinhartz gives the order to dive. Schiller continues to fire at the bombers, not hearing Frank's call to get inside. Seizing the opportunity to be rid of him, Frank goes below and closes the hatch. When Strelitz asks about Schiller, Frank lies that he was hit by bullets. The officers suggest that they return to a nearby supply vessel for repairs. Reinhartz asks Frank to make contact via VHF using U-612's codename, Scorpion, to avert any suspicion from Lorient. In Saint-Rémy, Margot goes to the village to fetch a doctor for Elias and meets Father Etienne, who directs her to Camille's Bistro. Forster, Duval and Desjesquier are in the square, encouraging collaboration from the villagers. Duval spots Margot leaving. He tells her that he switched allegiance and wants to help. In New York, Berger reveals that he is coordinating an attack on US naval bases with help from SS officers who will be arriving on a U-boat. Hoffmann could assist them and return to Germany on the boat. Returning to Cassandra's place, Cassandra and Hoffmann become lovers.
13	5	"Befehl zum Töten"	"Command to Kill"	Rick Ostermann	Tim Loane	8 May 2020
In La Rochelle, Standartenführer Gustav Eckermann offers Forster a promotion to the east to "re-organise" the Jews. Meanwhile Scorpion is to rendezvous with a supply vessel. Suspecting that Scorpion is really Reinhartz's boat, Gluck orders Wrangel to intercept Reinhartz near the vessel and obtains Admiral Dönitz's permission to sink U-822, forsaking all forty crew and the SS officers. In Saint-Rémy, Elias dies. On the ocean, Reinhartz spots U-612's periscope and aborts the approach to the supply vessel. On U-612, Pips accidentally starts a fire with an oily rag, which burns Ehrenberg's arm. From U-822, Reinhartz sees smoke rising from U-612 but does not turn back to help. Running submerged at ten per cent capacity, U-822 is struck by depth charges from three American corvettes. Wrangel orders the loading of the torpedo tubes, but Ehrenberg warns against engaging the enemy. U-612 then destroys two ships, but casualties in the torpedo room prevent an attack on the third one. On U-822, officers and SS men confront Reinhartz for not helping their comrades. At gunpoint, Friedel relieves him of his command "forever". Via intercom, Reinhartz pleads to his crew that defecting is "the only moral option" and that there is no victory if more men, women and children die. Friedel slaps him and asks Fischer to steer them back to aid U-612.
14	6	"Letzte Entscheidungen"	"Final Decisions"	Rick Ostermann	Colin Teevan	8 May 2020
On U-822, Frank and Reinhartz's Falcons come forward to help their captain take back control. On U-612, Pips commits suicide. In La Rochelle, Eckermann shows Forster the site plans for the Jewish labour camps, which include incinerators. In Saint-Rémy, Margot asks Etienne to forge certificates for David and Ruth. At the train depot, Forster demands that Baptiste, the train driver, make room in the cattle carriage for the prisoners bound for the Drancy internment camp. Later, Duval asks Baptiste to help the prisoners escape by stopping the train at a level crossing near the forest; then he tries to loosen the floorboards in the cattle car. Meanwhile, Forster has a new informant. Returning to the farmhouse, she is assaulted by Desjesquier but flees. David and Ruth go with Sylvie to the Spanish border. In New York, Cassandra breaks up with Sam for allowing her father to use her. Incensed with Hoffmann for stealing her, Sam threatens again to report him to the authorities. Hoffmann later saves a suicidal Max from drowning. Hoffmann goes with Berger to the Greenwoods' office to get the American radar plans, not knowing that Berger has orders to "eliminate" him. While Hoffmann is distracted, Berger pulls out a gun, but pauses when Sam arrives. While retrieving a file that proves his father's involvement with the Nazis, Sam is killed by Berger. In Berger's apartment, Hoffmann is shot and wounded but escapes with the plans for Maine.
15	7	"Kopf an Kopf"	"Head to Head"	Rick Ostermann	Colin Teevan	15 May 2020
Separated from David and Ruth, Sylvie returns to the farmhouse. After realising that Etienne betrayed them, Margot shoots him. At the Gestapo headquarters, Duval is arrested and tortured to extract information about the Resistance. In New York, police chief Thomas O'Leary shows Jack Greenwood the incriminating file that was found near Sam. In Maine, Hoffmann tells Cassandra that he is actually a German U-boat captain; she calls him a liar and walks out on him. Meanwhile, Reinhartz's wife commits suicide. On U-612, spotting U-822 from a distance, Wrangel orders an attack. U-822 dives, appearing to be hit. Reinhartz feigns destruction by ordering the spillage of diesel and the sending of items to the surface. In the torpedo room, the SS men momentarily seize control but Reinhartz shoots one of them dead. The corpse is also sent to the surface. Wrangel, not convinced by the signs of destruction, circles the area. Both captains eventually surface; U-612 rams U-822's port stern, and U-822 sinks U-612 with a torpedo. Wrangel, Neumann and Ehrenberg are the only survivors. On U-822, Reinhartz places Wrangel under arrest, but the power reverses when armed mutineers take control of the bridge. Wrangel then places Reinhartz under arrest.
16	8	"Auf der anderen Seite"	"On the Other Hand"	Rick Ostermann	Colin Teevan	15 May 2020
In La Rochelle, Duval is executed by firing squad. On the train bound for Drancy, David and Ruth are among the prisoners. At the level crossing, Baptiste stops the train so that Margot and other Resistance members can help the prisoners escape but they manage to get only the children out. The Gestapo surround them and Margot begs Forster for mercy. Forster refuses and has them all locked up in the cattle car. Desjesquier is also locked up. Near the Maine coast, the SS men, Friedel and Salz, disembark and row ashore. In the engine room, Frank appeals to Ehrenberg to set things right for his friend, Hoffmann, by helping them escape. Ehrenberg pretends to be drunk and runs the boat aground. Frank and the other prisoners escape through the torpedo hatch and swim ashore. Seeing Reinhartz escaping, Wrangel shoots him as he swims away. On the beach, seven men are recovering while another is lying face down in the distance. Frank and Laudrup run up to find Reinhartz dead. They leave him behind and walk on. At dawn, Hoffmann finds Cassandra returned to the diner. On U-822, Ehrenberg gets the boat out to sea. When Wrangel asks why he did not defect with the others, Ehrenberg plunges Hoffmann's blade into Wrangel's abdomen and says, "I can't swim". Near Maine, police officers ask to look at the SS men's suitcases. In Europe, Forster puts away his Gestapo uniform.

=== Season 3 (2022) ===
No. overall	No. in season	Title	English title	Directed by	Written by	Original release date
17	1	"Eine zweite Chance"	"A Second Chance"	Hans Steinbichler	Colin Teevan	14 May 2022 (Note: The third season was first screened on Sky Deutschland from 14 May to 11 June 2022.)
Royal Navy destroyer captain Jack Swinburne receives news that his son died in action. Set on revenge, he forces a U-boat to surface, shoots its captain and sinks it without picking up the survivors. In Kiel, Germany, at a gathering to welcome the Imperial Japanese Navy, Klaus Hoffmann's father and sister, Wilhelm and Hannie and Hannie's husband, Captain Albrecht Lessing, listen to Lt Commander Schulz's lauding that Germany is recruiting 40,000 new U-boat men and acquiring more iron ore and wolfram to build 300 new boats. At home, Wilhelm receives from Lorient U-612's logbook and weeps seeing his son's handwriting. Nearby, Ehrenberg visits the site where his wife and son died in a British bombing raid. Later, he is introduced by fellow engineer, Rudi Vogts, to Commander Franz Buchner and First Watch Officer Alois Erdmann of the new U-949. When questioned by Vogts about how he now has a post on land and the circumstances of Wrangel's death, Ehrenberg is not forthcoming. The next day, Vogts advises that U-949's sea trials will need to be delayed because the periscope is damaged. Ehrenberg, now in charge of new boats' first operations, takes the periscope's eyepiece to an optical store in town and meets Greta Nussmeier who repairs the lens. In Düsseldorf, pick-pocketers Pauli Müller and Harry Weidner are arrested. They are not yet seventeen years old but are coerced into volunteering for U-boat service. They are now called the "sewer rats" there. In Portugal, Forster steps off a plane with a new identity, Werner Giese.
18	2	"Neue Befehle"	"New Commands"	Hans Steinbichler	Tony Saint	14 May 2022
In Lisbon, at the German Consulate, Forster receives orders from Reinhard Weiss to investigate the death of Gestapo agent Dorfmann. At the morgue, he receives Dorfmann's belongings from Inspector Da Costa. In England, Swinburne's ship, Perseverance, gets new equipment and weapons. Later, he learns that his son's convoy was left unprotected because the escorts unexpectedly withdrew. In Kiel, Greta and her daughter Fanny visit Ehrenberg on his boat; he says that "not far from here there's a VIIC U-boat with your lens in it". At the Hoffmann's, Wilhelm asks Lessing to arrange a meeting with Ehrenberg to get a personal account of U-612's first mission. At the docks, Pauli, Harry and Bernd Cremer arrive for service on U-949. Resentful of Buchner's family status, Pauli pickpockets the notebook that Buchner uses to write down what he learns. This leads to the failure of the first Alarm drill because the commander does not know how to proceed. Afterwards, Pauli boasts about his prank to Willi, Bernd and Harry, who are angry with him for jeopardising their lives and future. Pauli is left alone, gets drunk and awaits a crashing bomber during an air raid.
19	3	"Das Blatt wendet sich"	"The Tide Is Turning"	Hans Steinbichler	Tony Saint	21 May 2022
Ehrenberg saves Pauli and urges him to stay alive. In Lisbon, the clues from Dorfmann's belongings lead Forster to his hotel's casino and a potential suspect, Dr. Beck. In England, Commodore Francombe reveals to Swinburne that his son's convoy was "under impending attack" from the German battleship Tirpitz and the convoy and the escorts were ordered to scatter and withdraw to reduce losses. At the Hoffman's home, Wilhelm asks Ehrenberg for the truth of his son's fate on U-612, but Ehrenberg can only say that Klaus was a good man and his friend. Submerged in the ocean, U-949 temporarily gets caught on the anchor chain of a moored sea mine, sustaining damages to a starboard steering rudder and the stern dive rudder. Afterwards, while Vogts, Erdmann and Ehrenberg are momentarily absent from the bridge, Harry's warning of a new sound from the surface is ignored by Buchner. The commander orders to the boat surface without first raising the periscope to check for clearance and U-949 collides with a German ship, killing a sailor. Vogts blames Ehrenberg for not reporting Buchner's incompetence. Hearing Vogts's admission that he does not wish to drown and leave his wife and children behind, Ehrenberg realises that it was he who sabotaged the periscope's lens. In Lessing's office, Ehrenberg learns that a court martial will hold Harry and Pauli accountable for the accident. When Ehrenberg protests, Schulz threatens him.
20	4	"Krieg mit anderen Mitteln"	"War By Other Means"	Hans Steinbichler	Colin Teevan, Tony Saint	21 May 2022
In Liverpool, a Swinburne eager to return to sea tells Daisy to move on with her life. In Lisbon, Forster meets Beck at the casino and finds evidence that he is planning to flee Portugal. Beck's mission is to negotiate for wolfram on behalf of Speer's Armaments Ministry but he prevaricates. At a lecture, Forster drugs Beck's drink and abducts him. Out on his boat with Pauli, Harry, Willi, Bernd, Greta and Fanny, Ehrenberg listens to Pauli's recollection of his experience of begging on the street and seeing the look of guilt from people who appeared to care but would not help. Pauli is troubled to find the same look from Ehrenberg now. Ehrenberg's guilt, he admits later to Greta, is failing in his duty to the boys. On U-949, Vogts intentionally inflicts an injury to his arm that leads to amputation. To save Vogts from a desertion charge as well as restore the crew's morale, Ehrenberg proposes a plan to Buchner and Erdmann that goes against his wish not to serve at sea again. At the court martial, Ehrenberg testifies that U-949 had "mechanical defects" that "caused it to surface unexpectedly"; therefore, neither the commander nor the crew are to blame. Ehrenberg is willing to take Vogts's place on the boat. His testimony surprises Lessing and Schulz but they accept it and order U-949 to leave the next day to catch up to the North Atlantic fleet. The repairs to the boat are not yet completed.
21	5	"In die Tiefe"	"In Depth"	Hans Steinbichler	Colin Teevan	28 May 2022
Forster kills a policeman about to interrupt his plan to abduct Beck, who is emphatic that he is loyal to Germany and Viktor Gruber, the German First Consul, can vouch for him. After handing Beck to Schröder for interrogation, Forster spends the night at Ines de Pina's (a waitress at the casino) place. That morning, Da Costa and the police come to Ines's to arrest him but he escapes through a window. Ines betrayed him. At the Consulate, Gruber's wife, Bettina, pressures him to sign the wolfram contract which requires payment in gold. In Kiel, Wilhelm asks Hannie if she knew that Klaus was alive in New York. Hannie admits that she and Albrecht were interrogated about his defection. Greta is overwhelmed by the responsibilities of managing her father's business, raising her daughter and now caring for her paralysed husband. Ehrenberg wants her to make the decision that is right for herself and Fanny. The men of U-949 work into the night to prepare for departure. Catching up to the pack, U-947 and U-948, they prepare for battle. Ehrenberg is virtually the commander. On Perseverance, Swinburne reveals the plan to bait the U-boats with the convoy. Swinburne notices that U-949 is moving in a "zigzag pattern" and suspects damage. From the conning tower, Buchner fires torpedoes one and two. One destroys a steamer but the other did not launch. Diving to hide from Perseverance, U-949 has five minutes to dislodge a live torpedo before it detonates.
22	6	"Eingekesselt"	"Encircled"	Dennis Gansel	Colin Teevan, Tony Saint	28 May 2022
Perseverance sinks U-947 and U-948. On U-949, Pauli crawls inside the torpedo tube and removes a rag stuck in the torpedo's propeller. The torpedo is released. On Perseverance, Swinburne watches the torpedo trail into nothingness and orders another salvo from the Hedgehog mortar. Harry reports hearing something peculiar, which Ehrenberg deduces is a new contact-detonated weapon. Doubling back towards the Mid-Atlantic gap, U-949 lures the destroyer further from its convoy. During those hours in hiding, Willi serves meals and looks after the crew, despite sustaining a deep cut on his hand. As a last attempt to evade ASDIC, Ehrenberg uses the boat's tendency to run in circles to generate bubbles and successfully confuse the signals. Swinburne orders the ASDIC to be turned off. Believing that the destroyer abandoned the search, Buchner raises the periscope, which is detected by Perseverance. Hedgehogs and depth charges strike U-949, sinking it. Seeing diesel spillage, First Officer David Mercer implores Swinburne to return to the convoy, reminding him how his son died. U-949 surfaces with Buchner raising the white flag but the destroyer left. After receiving news that twelve U-boats were lost in the last twenty-four hours, U-949 changes course for Africa. In Lisbon, Forster sees Da Costa harassing Ines. He follows Gruber to a park and meets Gardiner, the American novelist. At Gardiner's place, Forster finds compromising photos of Gruber. As he is about to confront Gardiner, Klaus Hoffmann appears and knocks him unconscious.
23	7	"Der Feind meines Feindes"	"The Enemy of My Enemy"	Dennis Gansel	Judith Angerbauer	4 June 2022
After the ordeals in New York and Maine, Klaus was interrogated by Lt Commander Gardiner of the US Navy who has a plan to end the war. It has been three weeks since Klaus arrived in Lisbon and nine months since he first met Forster in La Rochelle. Forster swears that he has proof that the wolfram negotiations between Portugal and Germany is illegal, because the trade for the wolfram is Beck's scientific expertise. Gardiner sees the possibility of ending the war if Germany no longer has wolfram for war munitions. In Kiel, Gruber invites Wilhelm to give a lecture in Lisbon and gives him Klaus's torpedo timer. Hannie and Albrecht separate after quarrelling about Klaus, the Hoffmann name and their failure to conceive. Soon after, Schulz makes his move on Hannie. Perseverance is en route to Gibraltar to join another convoy and Swinburne and his officers celebrate the birth of Mercer's son. Off the West Africa coast, U-949 waits for a delivery from a Japanese submarine. Erdmann and Buchner dress up as King and Mrs Neptune to raise the crew's morale. While drunk, Harry inadvertently exposes Pauli as an expert pickpocketer and it dawns on Buchner how his notebook had gone missing on the first day. At night, the Japanese submarine signals to U-949 that the cargo weighs five tonnes. Ehrenberg throws a line across, and Meierjohann, Pauli and Harry make the transfer via a raft. Willi is on deck to help pull the rope even though his hand injury has worsened. When he drops the rope, gold bars spill out onto the deck. On the submarine, a dangling crate knocks Pauli overboard. Harry dives in to pull him up but runs out of breath as he surfaces.
24	8	"Narrengold"	"Fool's Gold"	Dennis Gansel	Tony Saint, Colin Teevan	4 June 2022
The Japanese sailors rescue Harry and Pauli. On U-949, the crates of gold are stowed in the engine room bilge and under the beds. Heading to Portugal, Buchner and Ehrenberg calculate that they will need to travel at 23 kn (26 mph; 43 km/h) to arrive at the rendezvous on time but the extra weight and the damaged rudder slow them. Ehrenberg suggests staying on the surface and using the Tarfaya current to gain speed. The infection on Willi's hand has spread and Buchner drains the abscess. Near the Canary Islands, U-949 is spotted by British reconnaissance planes. On Perseverance, the report that "the U-boat has a kink in its wake" reawakens Swinburne's interest. With two days available, because their convoy has not fully assembled, Swinburne orders a pursuit of "Herr Zigzag" without air cover. In Kiel, Schulz reveals to Hannie his plan to embed a Party member on each U-boat to spy for them. In Lisbon, Bettina and Weiss are having an affair. Gardiner goes to the locker where the wolfram contract is kept. When he turns the key, a bomb explodes, killing him and others nearby. Forster is injured and shocked that Weiss wants him dead even though Germany will get wolfram from the new deal anyway. At Ines's, she removes a shrapnel from his shoulder and explains that Da Costa has been threatening to make things worse for her brother, who is in prison for protesting against the wolfram mining. Klaus offers to find out why Weiss has double-crossed Forster. He follows him from the Consulate to Schröder's where he overhears their arrangements for the arrival of a U-boat south of Lisbon. Nearby, the Grubers welcome to Lisbon the author of Do Not Fear the Depths, Captain Wilhelm Hoffmann.
25	9	"Der Seemannspsalm"	"The Sailor's Psalm"	Dennis Gansel	Colin Teevan	11 June 2022
In Kiel, Greta's husband wants to end his life but she is determined to keep him alive. In Lisbon, Ines makes contact with Wilhelm and receives Klaus's torpedo timer. Weiss and Bettina go over their plans to steal the gold shipment from the U-boat. On Perseverance's radar, the U-boat is travelling at 22 kn (41 km/h; 25 mph), which Swinburne finds "barely believable". U-949 passes the Canary Islands when Ehrenberg spots Perseverance; he and Buchner are shocked that it is the ship that was chasing them before. The gold bars tumble from their crates as the boat crash dives. Sustaining damage and sinking even deeper, Ehrenberg urges surrender but Buchner proposes a bluff. He orders torpedo three to be loaded, then U-949 surfaces, aligning its starboard in parallel with the destroyer's. Buchner swaps uniforms with Ehrenberg, and all, except for Ehrenberg and Willi, abandon ship. From Perseverance, Mercer notices that the white flag is not raised. Swinburne takes his boarding party across and greets Ehrenberg, believing him to be the commander. In the torpedo room, Pauli crawls out of tube one and waits for the signal. In the water, Buchner relays the order for the men to swim to the stern. Mercer is alarmed that the U-boat has rotated and its bow is pointing toward Perseverance. Buchner and his crew all sing Erika as Pauli fires torpedo three, destroying Perseverance, killing many, including Mercer, to Swinburne’s horror and the jubilation of the crew of U-949. After U-949 has regained control and the British crew have been rescued, Swinburne commends Ehrenberg for his skills but points out that his victory is dishonourable. Ehrenberg believes that war "strips us all of honour". When U-949 reaches the neutral waters of Portugal and must dive, Swinburne, taking responsibility for the loss of his ship, declares that he will accompany his crew in death. Ehrenberg salutes him. As U-949 submerges, Swinburne ties himself to the tower and recites the Sailor's Psalm.
26	10	"Ein richtiger U-Boot-Mann"	"A Real Submarine Man"	Dennis Gansel	Tony Saint	11 June 2022
U-949 releases the British crew off the coast of Portugal. Forster deduces that Weiss plans to steal the gold and asks Ines to get Da Costa to intercept. At night, Forster and Klaus wait at the bay. Weiss and Schröder arrive with trucks. Buchner steps off U-949 and asks Weiss for the password, "Danzig". The crew form a line to pass the gold bars down to the trucks. Pauli jokingly asks Schröder to help them but the disgraced former U-boat officer takes offence. While Weiss rewards the crew with beer, Klaus discovers a schematic drawing of a U-boat inside a truck, and warns the crew that they are in danger. Buchner orders retreat. Aiming his gun at Pauli, Schröder yells insults, "You're not real U-boat men!" Klaus puts him down. Seeing Buchner in the tower, Klaus salutes him and Buchner returns the salute. Da Costa arrives in time to end the conflict and takes five gold bars for himself. Afterwards, he informs Gruber that the Portuguese authorities have received the gold for the wolfram. Bettina is shocked that the plan failed and Weiss is dead. Klaus asks Gruber to stage an announcement of his escape from America, then he and his father reunite. Wilhelm is appalled by Forster's denial of responsibility for the atrocities in France and Poland. On U-949, Willi dies "a senseless death". Looking ahead, Buchner has an idea for their boat's emblem – a sewer rat, which delights Pauli and Harry. Disembarking in Kiel, Buchner is unmoved by Schulz's insinuations about six missing gold bars. The boat is searched but no gold is found. Harry, Pauli and Bernd feel let down to have been treated like thieves. When Harry jokes about Pauli pickpocketing the gold, Pauli mischievously smiles. Ehrenberg is happy to see Greta again but his hopes are dashed when Fanny appears with her father. In Lisbon, Forster shows Bettina the two plane tickets to Brazil that were found in Weiss's possession, and tells her he knows that she and Weiss had conspired to have Dorfmann killed. Returning to his boat, Ehrenberg finds Klaus at the pier and they tearfully embrace. Forster smokes his last cigarette and commits suicide. Da Costa orders to bury him as a "nobody".

=== Season 4 (2023) ===
No. overall	No. in season	Title	English title	Directed by	Written by	Original release date
27	1	"Ein deutscher Held"	"A German Hero"	Dennis Gansel	Tony Saint	23 September 2023 (Note: All episodes of season four were released on 23 November 2023 on Sky Go and Sky Q.)
In August 1943, Franz Buchner finds himself in action with U-949 while an informer on board divides his crew. Meanwhile, the Hoffmann family gathers in Berlin to attend the premiere of a film about Klaus. A private fight between Wilhelm and Schulz over Hannie's reputation leads to Wilhelm's death.
28	2	"Ziel erfasst"	"Target Locked"	Dennis Gansel	Colin Teevan	23 September 2023
Not long after the Grubers' return to Germany from Portugal, Gustav is entrapped and imprisoned for his homosexuality. In Kiel, at Wilhelm's funeral, Ehrenberg offers Klaus his condolences and support in their work as agents of Fidelio and gives Klaus Hoffmann a clue, but Bobby Schulz is on his trail while U-949 comes under fire in the Strait of Gibraltar.
29	3	"Hüter meines Bruders"	"My Brother's Keeper"	Dennis Gansel	Colin Teevan	23 September 2023
Buchner, Cremer and Pauli are the only survivors after the destruction of U-949, and reach the coast of Naples, where Klaus is also heading to, while his sister Hannie finds herself meeting with the 12-year-old Hertha.
30	4	"Frontlinien"	"Battle Lines"	Dennis Gansel	Judith Angerbauer	23 September 2023
Klaus Hoffmann commands the ailing U-330 on a secret dive, but not all the men trust him. Meanwhile, Hannie wants to take Hertha in, and staff officer Heinrich Gluck has to make a decision. Unveiling Rubens's Het Pelsken painting from a crate, Koch proposes to Werner and a Vatican contact the 'Lisbon Line' as a safe route for relocating the looted art works. Feeling the pressure from Hitler to identify Fidelio, Werner presses Koch to arrest any likely suspect; Schulz, too, threatens to expose conspiracies from within Gluck's office. Ehrenberg begs Gluck for another chance to come clean about La Rochelle, U-612, Tennstedt and Wrangel, and prevent further atrocities. Later, Gluck confesses to Hannie, his goddaughter, that he is to blame for U-612's mutiny against Klaus and the tragedies that follow. Hannie breaks with Schulz after he coerces her to reveal Klaus's secret location. In Naples, Klaus is surprised to find that Rahn and the crew of U-330 have been expecting him. With a crew of eight, including Buchner and Cremer, Rahn reluctantly seeks out a local man who has control of the docks to negotiate the release of their gunman from jail. Sal loathes the Germans but offers his services in exchange for meats and cigarettes. The gunman turns out to be Gunther Maas who defended Klaus on U-612; he and Klaus happily reunite. En route to Toulon, Buchner and Klaus spot a burning German transport ship and an enemy plane. To Buchner's surprise, Klaus raises a white flag to surrender; the plane does not acknowledge.
31	5	"Punkt ohne Wiederkehr"	"Point of No Return"	Dennis Gansel	Tony Saint	23 September 2023
U-330 shows up next to a US Navy ship after conducting a risky manoeuvre, SS man Koch uncovers the identity of the spy Fidelio, and Hannie gets on the trail of the Lebensborn organisation. The Allies land in the Gulf of Salerno. After uncovering a file about Gretchen's placement in the Lebensborn programme, Hannie overhears of Werner's involvement. Hiding in a car that takes her to Werner's, Hannie finds Gretchen and Herta but they are quickly surrounded by Werner and his men.
32	6	"Nichts persönliches"	"Nothing Personal"	Dennis Gansel	Colin Teevan	23 September 2023
Schulz kills again, Klaus Hoffmann has to realise that the Allied invasion is already underway, and a man with a murder mission is waiting in Naples.

== Production ==
=== Conception and development ===
In June 2015, it was announced that a television series adaptation of the 1981 film, Das Boot, would be made. In July 2016, it was further announced that the series would be in eight parts, to be directed by Andreas Prochaska and produced by Bavaria Fiction, Sky Deutschland and Sonar Entertainment. The series was based on Lothar-Günther Buchheim's book Das Boot (1973) with additions from Die Festung (1995).

The director of season one, Andreas Prochaska, explained that it was important for the series to maintain the anti-war stance and "explore the perennial theme of what war does to people", but it would not be possible to sustain "the original film's relentless focus on a submarine crew ... over an eight-part TV series". Therefore, the decision by the creators and co-writers, Tony Saint and Johannes W. Betz, to set the series in late 1942, "after the Allies have cracked the German military's Enigma code and can track the movement of their submarine fleets", enabled a foretelling of the impacts of these events, not only upon the U-boat crews but also their loved ones and others connected to them. Prochaska discussed the series as "[going] a step further than the film did" by adding the Resistance storyline, stating, "[it] gives a chance to bring in strong female characters".

=== Casting ===
The cast for season one, announced in September 2017, included Vicky Krieps, Tom Wlaschiha, Vincent Kartheiser, James D'Arcy and Thierry Frémont, Lizzy Caplan, Rick Okon, August Wittgenstein, Rainer Bock, Leonard Scheicher, Robert Stadlober, Franz Dinda, and Stefan Konarske.

In season two, Clemens Schick, Thomas Kretschmann, Michael McElhatton, Ulrich Matthes and Rochelle Neil joined the cast.

The new cast in season three included Ray Stevenson, Luise Wolfram], Elisa Schlott, Anna Schudt, Joana Ribeiro, Florian Panzner, Artjom Gilz, Jo Hartley, Fritzi Haberlandt, Johann von Bülow, Trystan Pütter, Franz Hartwig, and Ernst Stötzner who replaced Ulrich Matthes as Wilhelm Hoffmann. Jürgen Prochnow, who starred in the original film, was offered a role but refused.

Joining the cast season four are Sascha Geršak, Steffan Rhodri, Marco Leonardi, Wilson Gonzalez Ochsenknecht, Lara Mandoki, Stefan Murr, Benjamin Dilloway, Joshua Collins, and Rosalie Thomass, who replaces Luise Wolfram as Hannie Hoffmann Lessing.

=== Cinematography ===
From 2020, the series is filmed in 8K resolution. Cinematographer Armin Franzen explains that an advantage of the larger 8K format is not having to use wide camera lenses such as the 21mm when shooting inside the small enclosed interiors of the submarine sets. By using longer focal lengths, such as the 29mm, 35mm and 50mm, the subjects are brought closer to the camera, thus allowing the audience to "be closer to the characters' emotions" as the tragedies of war mount.

=== Filming and locations ===
Filming for season one started on 31 August 2017 and finished on 20 February 2018. The budget was 33 million euro (USD 39 million). In December 2018, plans for a second season were announced. Malta, Germany (Munich), France (La Rochelle) and Czech Republic (Prague) were chosen for the location shooting.

Filming for season two began in April and completed in July 2019, taking place again in Malta, Prague and La Rochelle, and a new location, England. In England, specifically, Liverpool and Manchester were used for the scenes set in New York. When the COVID-19 pandemic struck in 2020 and it was no longer possible for the production team to travel to the Prague studios, some of the post-production work, such as visual effects and sound mixing, were completed by the remote work arrangement.

In season three, Prague was the location for the exterior scenes set in Kiel and Liverpool, while Malta was used for the interiors of Lisbon and Liverpool.

For the fourth season, filming of the six episodes began in June 2022 and wrapped in September 2022. The locations for season four included Kalkara, Marsa and Kordin in Malta.

=== Languages ===
With dialogue in German, French, English, Portuguese and Italian, the series features characters (e.g., Simone and Frank Strasser) who not only speak in multiple languages but also embody different language identities. German and British writers, Johannes W. Betz, Tony Saint, Colin Teevan and Judith Angerbauer, among others, collaborate to ensure that the nuances of the languages are appropriately translated and deployed.

=== Music ===
For the opening theme, composer Matthias Weber added to composer Klaus Doldinger's anthem for the 1981 film "a simple piano" melody and "an underlying bass pulse". Working with director Andreas Prochaska in season one, their goal was to find a balance between the emotional and the abstract in order to express "a sense of loneliness" as well as "vast space". For the remainder of the score, Weber also wanted to achieve a contemporary feel in a similar way to Doldinger by employing only the sounds of the Haken Continuum without accompaniment and adding drone-like rhythms. After previewing the first episode of the series in 2018, Doldinger commented: "it was fascinating to see how the world of Das Boot is brought to life together with the play of images and Matthias Weber's interpretation of the main motif. I'm happy to be back on board Das Boot and compliments to Matthias Weber". The score for season one was nominated for the 2019 German Television Award for Best Music, and the score for season three won the 2022 Hollywood Music in Media Awards for Score - TV Show/Limited Series (Foreign Language).

=== Picture format and sound ===
Das Boot is produced in 8K resolution and Dolby Atmos three-dimensional audio technology.

=== Submarines, replicas and emblems ===
Like U-96, the featured submarine of the 1981 film, the U-boats in the series are also of the Type VIIC. The submarine used in filming the series was the non-diving replica built in Malta as the 'modified' S-33 for the film U-571, also shot in Malta. Footage, sets and models from that movie have been reused for other productions, including Submerged, depicting the loss of USS Sailfish, and the fictional HMS Scorpion in Ghostboat. The replica is still afloat, moored at Cassar ship repair yard, Marsa, in the inner part of the Grand Harbour. A special rig was built for the production by a Maltese armoury team, that allowed the submarine's anti-aircraft gun to both fire and recoil, which had not been done before with a blank-firing gun.

The submarine set is designed by production designer Nick Palmer and is constructed in Barrandov Studios in Prague, Czech Republic. It is 45 metres long, 5 metres wide, filling up an area of 235 square metres, and able to simulate the motion of a submarine in water.

Like the infamous laughing swordfish (Der lachende Schwertfisch) emblem that adorned U-96 in the film, each featured U-boat in the series also bears an emblem on either side of the conning tower which represents, at times incongruously, the characters of the boat's captain and its crew. The emblem for Wrangel's U-113 is a skeleton; Hoffmann's first U-boat, U-612, a scorpion; Reinhartz's U-822, a falcon; Buchner's U-949, a sewer rat; the boat scuttled by Swinburne, a fox; and Hoffman's last U-boat, U-330, a cockroach.

=== Tropes ===
The trope of the hunter becomes the hunted, a plot device that was used in the film, continues to be developed in the series. Other nautical fiction and non-fiction tropes include: mutiny, sailors' superstitions, Ahab-like obsessions, and the cliches of the submarine screen genre, namely "claustrophobia, fire and flood, creaking hulls, dwindling oxygen, an unstable crew member, ... periscope POV, playing possum, depth charges, silent running", and frantic calls of "Alarm!".

== Release ==
=== Broadcast ===
The series premiered on 23 November 2018 on Sky One in Germany. The broadcast rights were sold to more than 100 countries before the series premiered. It was broadcast on Sky Atlantic in the United Kingdom in February 2019, Hulu in the United States in June 2019, SBS in Australia, and TVNZ in New Zealand. Season three was originally scheduled to screen in Europe on 9 April 2022 but was deferred until 14 May 2022 out of consideration for the Russian invasion of Ukraine.

=== Marketing ===
According to Samsung, in 2020, "the series was the first native 8K produced TV series ... [to be] launched exclusively in 8K on Samsung TV Plus in Germany". In 2022, streaming for season three was available on Samsung QLED 8K SmartTVs via Sky Q in Germany.

== Reception ==
=== Viewership ===
For season one, it was reported in Europe that there were 1.44 million viewers on Sky Deutschland during the first month of screening, between 23 November to 16 December 2018, and an additional 2.8 million viewers on non-linear distribution platforms. Outside Europe, one source in the United States reported 1.13 million linear viewers and 1.89 million on-demand viewers.

=== Critical response ===
On the review aggregation website Rotten Tomatoes, the series holds an approval rating of 85% based on 34 reviews. The critics' consensus reads: "Das Boot possesses the atmospheric pressure of its cinematic forebear while adding new depth to its compelling ensemble, making for a riveting international production".

The reviews for season one from Germany were mixed. German historian, Sven Felix Kellerhoff, criticised the plot around the industrial family Greenwood and their financial ties with Nazi Germany as potentially relativising German guilt. Kathleen Hildebrandt from Süddeutsche Zeitung found the portrayal of the women to be rather clichéd, and the series could have been more relevant if it had not cared so much about getting good audience numbers. Thomas Klein from Berliner Zeitung noted that there were "no Nazis in Das Boot, no 'Heil Hitler', no staunch party members", and the series was more about the commercialisation of a famous brand.

Irish writer Colin Teevan, who became the lead writer of season two, found that "critics everywhere love the show, except in Germany" because, in Germany, the critics considered to be unacceptable the perspective that "Germany is not totally and wholly responsible, wrong and guilty".

Outside Germany, the reviews were favourable. Some critics found season one to be "clever and utterly thrilling", season two, innovative in taking the WWII film and television genre to "somewhere new", and season three, sensitive to the grief that was experienced on both sides of the war. According to Adam Sweeting of i [newspaper], Das Boot stands apart from its predecessor by going beyond inducing the feeling of claustrophobia inside a submarine and offers instead a "satellite-vision scope". In season two, in particular, this perspective shows how von Reinhartz, Simone, Frank Strasser and Margot Bostal, react to the pains of war and make compromises which they know to be "soul-destroying" in order to survive and stand up to the Nazis.

Anita Singh in The Telegraph gave it three out of five and was unimpressed by the plot. Other reviews were also mixed, comparing it negatively with the original film. Prochnow said, "it has absolutely nothing to do with [the film]. Not even with [the] book... [This is] a completely different story and shouldn't be called ["Das Boot"] in my opinion".

=== Awards and nominations ===
Award	Year (Note: The listed year refers to the date of the ceremony.)	Category	Nominee(s)	Result	Ref.
American Society of Cinematographers Award	2020	Episode of a Series for Non-Commercial Television	David Luther for Das Boot: Gegen die Zeit (S1, E6)	Nominated	
Bavarian TV Award	2019	Special Prize of the Jury for the Outstanding Achievement in Production	Das Boot	Won	
Bavarian TV Award	2021	Best Actor	Rainer Bock	Won	
C21 International Drama Award	2019	Best Non-English Language Drama Series	Das Boot	Nominated	
German Academy for Television (DAfF)	2022	Best Director	Hans Steinbichler and Dennis Gansel	Nominated	
German Academy for Television (DAfF)	2019	Best Music	Matthias Weber	Nominated	
German Academy for Television (DAfF)	2019	Best Production Design	Nick Palmer	Nominated	
German Academy for Television (DAfF)	2019	Best VFX/Animation	Viktor Muller and Vít Komrzý	Won	
German Academy for Television (DAfF)	2020	Best Sound Design	Ed Cantú, Peter Hilcansky, Dominik Leube, Kath Pollard, Pavel Rejholec, David Titera, Manuel Vogt	Won	
German Camera Award	2019	Cinematographer	David Luther for Das Boot (S1, E6)	Won	
German TV Award	2019	Best Actress	Vicky Krieps	Won	
German TV Award	2019	Best Cinematography	David Luther	Won	
German TV Award	2019	Best Actor	Tom Wlaschiha	Nominated	
German TV Award	2019	Best Directing for a Movie Made for Television or Miniseries	Andreas Prochaska	Nominated	
German TV Award	2019	Best Drama Series	Das Boot	Nominated	
German TV Award	2019	Best Editing	Ueli Christen, Karin Hartusch	Nominated	
German TV Award	2019	Best Music	Matthias Weber	Nominated	
German TV Award	2019	Best Writing	Tony Saint and Johannes W. Betz	Nominated	
German TV Award	2019	Best Production and/or Costume Design	Nick Palmer (production designer) / Chattoune (costume designer)	Nominated	
Golden Nymph Award	2019	Outstanding Actress	Vicky Krieps	Won	
Golden Nymph Award	2019	Best Actor	Tom Wlaschiha	Nominated	
Golden Nymph Award	2019	Best TV Drama Series	Das Boot	Nominated	
GQ Men of the Year Award	2018	TV National	Das Boot	Won	
GQ Men of the Year Award	2021	Best Actor National	Tom Wlaschiha	Won	
Grimme Award	2019	Fiction	Das Boot	Nominated	
Hollywood Music in Media Awards	2022	Score - TV Show/Limited Series (Foreign Language)	Matthias Weber	Won	
Jupiter Award	2021	Best TV Series (National)	Das Boot	Nominated	
Jupiter Award	2022	Best Actor (National)	Tom Wlaschiha	Nominated	
Jupiter Award	2022	Best TV Series (National)	Das Boot	Nominated	
New York TV & Film Award	2020	Best Camerawork	David Luther	Gold	
New York TV & Film Award	2020	Drama	Das Boot	Finalist	
New York TV & Film Award	2021	Best Costume Design	Chattoune	Gold	
New York TV & Film Award	2021	Best Sound Design	Pavel Rejholec	Gold	
New York TV & Film Award	2021	Drama	Das Boot	Silver	
Operators Award Television Drama	2021	British Society of Cinematographers	Benjamin Treplin	Won	
Quotenmeter TV Award	2019	Best Actress	Vicky Krieps	Nominated	
Rockie Awards	2021	Drama Series: Non-English Language	Das Boot	Nominated	
ROMY Award	2019	Prize of the Jury	Das Boot	Won	
Rose d'Or Award	2020	Drama	Das Boot	Nominated	
Seoul International Drama Awards	2021	Best Mini-Series	Das Boot	Nominated	
Shanghai TV Festival Magnolia Award	2019	Best Foreign Film/Miniseries	Das Boot	Won	
Shanghai TV Festival Magnolia Award	2021	Best Foreign TV Series	Das Boot	Nominated	
TBI Innovation Award	2019	Best Debut Drama Series	Das Boot	Nominated	
TV Choice Award	2021	Best Drama Series	Das Boot	Nominated	
