= LNH =

LNH may refer to:

- Ligue Nationale de Hockey, the French name for the National Hockey League
- Ligue Nationale de Handball, the governing body of men's professional team handball in France
- Dirac large numbers hypothesis, a hypothesis in cosmology
- Lanoh language, ISO 639-3 code lnh
- Lanhsa Airlines, ICAO code LNH
- Luftnachrichtenhelferinnen (LNH), a designation in the German Women's Auxiliary Services
- Laku noć, Hrvatska (Good Night Croatia), a satirical Croatian-language cartoon
