= Colin Teevan =

Irish playwright (born 1968)

Colin Teevan (born 1968 in Dublin) is an Irish playwright, translator and writer for screen.

Teevan has written for multiple shows including Das Boot (Sky), Silk (BBC) Vera (ITV) and Single Handed (ITV). He also created, wrote and was co-executive producer of Rebellion (Netflix and RTE) and Charlie (RTE). Both Rebellion and Charlie won multiple IFTAs including Best Actor for Aidan Gillen as Charlie Haughey in Charlie.

Teevan's theatre work has been produced at The West End, The Barbican, Royal National Theatre, The Young Vic, Soho Theatre, Tokyo Metropolitan Theatre, the National Theatre of Scotland, The Abbey Theatre, Andrews Lane Theatre and the Bouffes du Nord. He has collaborated with Sir Peter Hall, Hideki Noda and Kathryn Hunter. His shows have starred Kit Harington, Sally Hawkins and Clare Higgins.

== Film ==
- The Tiger (in post production)

== Television ==
- Titans of the Ancient World (in post production)
- Das Boot, Series 4, (in post production)
- Colosseum (2022)
- Das Boot, Series 3 (2022)
- Das Boot, Series 2 (2021)
- Rebellion 2: Resistance, (2019)
- Rebellion, (2016)
- Charlie (2015)
- Silk, Series 3, Episode 3 (2014)
- Vera, Sandancers , 2 episodes (2012)
- Single Handed, Between Two Fires (2011)

== Plays ==
- The Seven Pomegranate Seeds (2021)
- The Emperor, adapted from Ryszard Kapuściński (2018)
- Doctor Faustus (play), adapted from Christopher Marlow (2013)
- The Kingdom, (2012)
- There Was A Man, There Was No Man (2012)
- The Lion of Kabul (2009)
- The Diver, co-written with Hideki Noda, (2008)
- Peer Gynt, adapted from Ibsen (2007)
- Don Quixote, adapted from the novel by Miguel de Cervantes, with Pablo Ley (2007)
- How Many Miles to Basra? (2006)
- The Bee, co-written with Hideki Noda,(2006)
- Missing Persons; Four Tragedies and Roy Keane (2006)
- Alcmaeon in Corinth (2005)
- Bacchai, translated from Euripides (2002)
- Monkey, based on Journey to the West (2001)
- The Walls (2001)
- Cuckoos, translation of Zozos by Giuseppe Manfridi (2000)
- Marathon, translation of Maratona di New York by Edoardo Erba (1999)
- Iph. . . adapted from Iphigeneia of Euripides (1999)
- Svejk, from the novel by Jaroslav Hasek (1999)
- Vinegar and Brown Paper (1995)
- The Big Sea (1991)

== Radio Plays ==
- Marathon Tales, BBC Radio 3 (2012)
- Massistonia, BBC Radio 3(2011)
- Myrrha, BBC Radio 4 (2008)
- The Devil Was Here Yesterday, BBC Radio 3 (2008)
- The Revanant, BBC Radio 3 (2007)
- Arse, BBC Radio 3 (2007)
- Glass Houses, BBC Radio 4 (2007)
- What we said about the whale and what the whale said about us, BBC Radio 3 (2006)
- Roy Keane and the Wrath of Apollo, BBC Radio 3 (2006)
- How Many Miles to Basra?, BBC Radio (2004)
- Medea: The Last Word BBC Radio 3, (2003)
- Blair on Blair, BBC Radio 3 (2004)
- Tricycles, BBC Radio 3 (2002)
- RoyKeaneiad Part 2, BBC Radio 3 (2002)
- RoyKeaneiad Part 1, BBC Radio 3 (2002)
- Iph. . . BBC Radio 3 (2001)
- Farquhar’s Bequest, RTE (1997)
- Le Grande Large, Radio France Culture (1993)
