= The Tunnel (2001 film) =

2001 German television film

- 'DVD cover
- German: Der Tunnel
- Written by: Johannes W. Betz
- Directed by: Roland Suso Richter
- Starring: Heino Ferch; Nicolette Krebitz; Alexandra Maria Lara; Sebastian Koch
- Music by: Harald Kloser; Thomas Wanker
- Country of origin: Germany
- Original language: German

Production
- Producers: Nico Hofmann; Ariane Krampe
- Running time: 157 min.

Original release
- Release: 21 January 2001

The Tunnel (German: Der Tunnel) is a 2001 German made-for-television historical drama film directed by Roland Suso Richter. It is loosely based on true events in Berlin following the closing of the East German border in August 1961 and the subsequent construction of the Berlin Wall. The theatrical release is 20 minutes shorter than the original television version. The subtitled English version was released in 2005.

== Plot ==
The central character of the film is Harry Melchior, based on the real tunneler, Hasso Herschel. Despite being imprisoned for several years for his role in the June 1953 uprising in East Germany, Melchior competes for and wins the national swimming championship in 1961. With the aid of a false passport and disguise, Harry succeeds in fleeing to West Berlin. His best friend, Matthis, manages to escape through the underground sewer, but Matthis's pregnant wife Carola is caught and remains in East Berlin. Harry's beloved sister, Lotte, and her husband and daughter are ambivalent about leaving the confines of the GDR.

Committed to getting their loved ones out of the GDR but knowing that ground routes are heavily guarded, Harry and Matthis have the idea of going underground. Matthis is an engineer by training. They link up with a small circle of others, initially Vittorio 'Vic' Constanza and Fred von Klausnitz. They find an unused factory building close to the Wall that has ample underground space. They are eventually joined by Fritzi Scholz, whose fiancé, Heiner, is also trapped in the east.

The work is slow, hard and sometimes dangerous, and the group reluctantly agrees to take in several more helpers. Over a span of months, the tunnel takes shape following Matthis' design, with the necessary shoring, lights and even a railbed. Discovering a film crew from NBC in the city one day, the leaders convince the network to fund their efforts in exchange for exclusive footage of the digging and eventual escape.

In the meantime, communication with the would-be rescuees in the east is necessary but hazardous. Vic, an American citizen, can pass through the border freely. He is in contact with Lotte and with Carola. The latter, however, has been blackmailed by the Stasi to inform; if she does not cooperate, the state will take her soon-to-be-born baby. Carola informs on Vic and he is detained when trying to cross back to West Berlin. He is released after a while but cannot go back to the east. Fritzi's love, Heiner, makes a futile attempt to cross the barbed wire and walls, but is shot by the East German border guards and left to die in a scene mirroring the true case of Peter Fechter. The American soldiers prevent Harry from climbing the wall to help Heiner.

Overseeing the efforts to thwart tunnelers and other efforts at "illegal emigration" is Colonel Kröger.

Finally the pieces are all in place for the planned escape of about 30 people. Word is spread by surreptitious means, though the Stasi are watching closely. They go to the home of Fred's widowed mother to take her into custody, but she takes her own life first.

Carola has admitted to Lotte that she has been an informant but swears she can now be trusted. In a ruse that means leaving her baby with Lotte's family, she leads her Stasi tail to a remote location far from the actual escape site. In the meantime, Fritzi has crossed the border with a fake passport to guide the escapees through the tunnel. After the true location of the escape is discovered, Harry enters East Berlin through the tunnel and, surprising a border guard, takes his uniform, helmet and gun, and blends in with the troops swarming the area in order to send them in wrong directions. The would-be escapees gather in a café across from the building where the tunnel begins, and Fritzi gradually escorts them over. Tense moments ensue as Colonel Kröger closes in, and pursues the escapees through the tunnel. A sign has been erected in the tunnel marking the boundary of the French sector, and the pursuing guards have the political sense to know they cannot go further.

== Cast ==
- Heino Ferch - Harry Melchior
- Nicolette Krebitz - Friederike 'Fritzi' Scholz
- Sebastian Koch - Matthis Hiller
- Alexandra Lara - Lotte Lohmann
- Mehmet Kurtuluş - Vittorio Costanza
- Heinrich Schmieder - Theo Lohmann
- Dorothea Moritz - Hermine
- Claudia Michelsen - Carola Langensiep
- Felix Eitner - Fred von Klausnitz
- Uwe Kockisch - Oberst Krüger
- Karin Baal - Marianne von Klausnitz
- Wolf-Dietrich Sprenger - Fotograf Grüner
- Florian Panzner - Heiner

== Awards ==
- Winner of the 2001 Bavarian TV Award (Heino Ferch and Roland Suso Richter)
- Winner of the 2001 German Television Award (best TV film/mini-series)
- Heino Ferch was awarded the Golden Camera in 2002
