= Wie die Karnickel =

- Directed by: Sven Unterwaldt
- Written by: Ralf König
- Produced by: Jens Nieswand
- Starring: Michael Lott; Sven Walser; Anna Böttcher; Heinrich Schmieder; Heinrich Schafmeister; Andreja Schneider; Nicole Heyka
- Cinematography: Klaus Liebertz
- Edited by: Christel Suckow, Stefan Essl
- Music by: Marius Ruhland
- Release date: September 12, 2002
- Running time: 84 minutes
- Language: German

Wie die Karnickel (Like Rabbits) is a comedy film by Sven Unterwaldt from 2002, with a script by Ralf König, who also wrote a comic based on the script.

== Storyline ==
Horst Bömmelburg's relationship to his girlfriend Vera is stressful and unsatisfactory in every aspect. When Vera finds a pornographic film in the trash, she leaves him and moves in with her mother.

Horst makes friends with his new gay neighbour, Siggi, who introduces him to a new and much more relaxed perspective on his sex drive. At the same time he starts an affair with the famous soprano singer Kriemhild Nastrowa, who is guesting with the orchestra that Horst plays double bass in.

Vera does not know any of this and, on her friend Gilla's advice, attempts to seduce Horst over dinner with sexy underwear. However, the attempt fails miserably. Gilla then introduces Vera to Gudrun and Britta, editors of a lesbian/feminist magazine called Xanthippe. They interpret Vera's story in their own way and publish an article in which Horst is presented as an inconsiderate "offender".

Soon after, Vera turns up at Horst and Siggi's flat party. When Horst makes a crude attempt at lessening Vera's feelings of humiliation from the disastrous dinner, she kicks him in the groin and walks out of the party. On the same evening, Kriemhild ends her affair with Horst, who is feeling rather relieved, as her insatiable sexual appetite was beginning to exhaust him. Kriemhild marries the geriatric conductor of the orchestra, who arranges a job for her at the Scala.

Siggi has just split up with his longtime partner Hubert, and lives his life between one-night stands and the desire to return to him. When his mother announces a visit, he plans to finally come out to her and present Hubert as his steady partner. However, he declines, and so Benny, a one-night stand, is asked instead. When Siggi's mother visits, Hubert unexpectedly does appear, thereby blowing Siggi's cover, and on top of this starting an affair with Benno.

Horst admits his passion for porn star Kelly Trump to Siggi. Without Horst knowing, Siggi signs him up to be a guest on the trash talk show Catch your Dreams, where Kelly Trump and another actress, as well as the Xanthippe editors are also invited. Horst arrives with Siggi as a supposed audience member, and when he is asked on stage, he is publicly exposed as addicted to pornography. The talk-show host introduces the other guests and does his best to play everyone off against each other.

Siggi had only wanted to help Horst meet Kelly, and so tries to leave the live show with him. Vera suddenly turns up, having watched the show at home. She has become so enraged when the skewed presentation of her relationship in Xanthippe was read out on TV, that she rushed into the studio to set things right. While angry discussions are raging on stage, Vera starts to make friends with Kelly Trump, and Horst returns to the show. He demands to know what all the fuss has been about and asks everyone in the audience who has seen a porn movie to stand up. After some hesitation the entire room ends up standing.

After the show Vera and Horst make peace and agree that their relationship had no real basis. Vera goes to the pub with Kelly, and Horst and Siggi go home contemplating.

== Background ==
Ralf König wanted to put heterosexual relationships to the forefront for the first time with this film, after his preceding works always centered on homosexuality in German society. His own perspective on heterosexual relationships, as a homosexual, is shown through the character of Siggi.

This story, as opposed to all other films by König, was first written as a script, and then published as a comic.

As the film managed to cast one of the most famous German porn stars of the 90's in Kelly Trump, her name was used instead of the name in the script. For the comic the original name was kept.
