= Ralf König =

German comic book creator (born 1960)

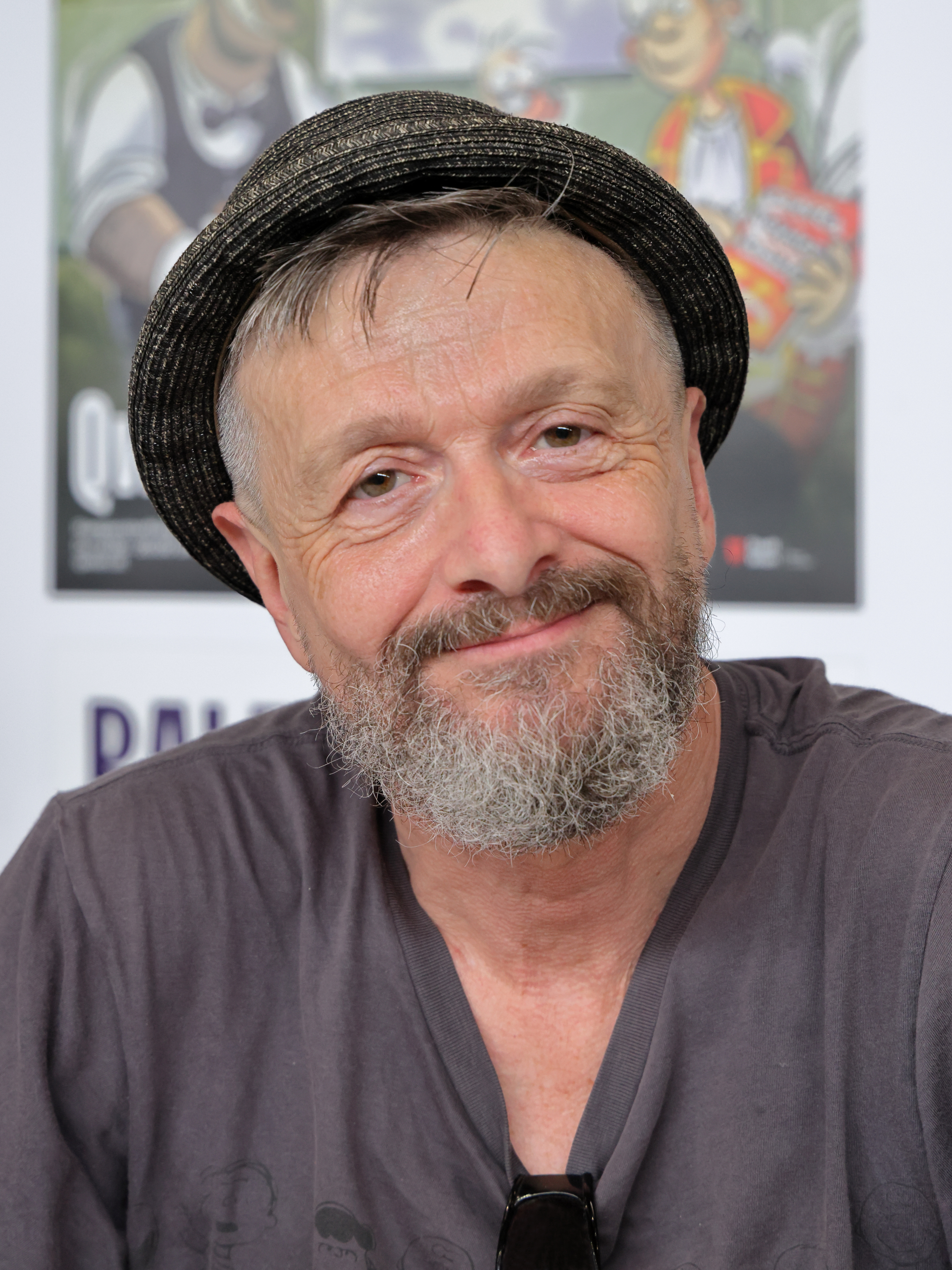
- König in 2026
- Born: 8 August 1960 (age 66) Soest, West Germany
- Notable works: The Killer Condom; Der bewegte Mann; Lysistrata; Pretty Baby; Wie die Karnickel
- Awards: Full list

Ralf König (born 8 August 1960) is one of the best known and most commercially successful German comic book creators. His books have been translated into many languages. He has resided in Soest, Dortmund and Berlin and now lives in Cologne.

== Biography ==
After attending a German Hauptschule, König completed an apprenticeship, learning the trade of a joiner. In 1979, he came out as a gay man, and about this time he created short comics stories that appeared in the Munich underground magazine Zomix and the gay periodical Rosa Flieder. He returned to school from 1981 to 1986, attending the public Kunstakademie Düsseldorf and pursuing a major in free art (Freie Kunst). Also in 1981, his early collected comics were published by the gay publishing house Verlag rosa Winkel as SchwulComix (GayComix). In 1987, he wrote The Killer Condom (Kondom des Grauens), his first comic with a continuous story, which was later produced as a film.

In the German-speaking world, König's comics have a vast homosexual fan base. Despite initial skepticism about the prospect of a broader audience due to his works' frequent setting within the gay milieu, his comics have achieved considerable popularity among heterosexual readers as well. A few of his comics have been adapted into films, and several have translated into other languages. By 2008, his total publications exceeded 5 million copies. Since November 2017, König is an Ambassador of intaktiv e.V., an association against ritual circumcision of male children.

== Style ==
Mural in Brussels, disfigured with the words transphobia and racism

König's stories are drawn in an expressive cartoon style. Consistently written with humour, they occasionally deal with serious themes such as the tension between sexual freedom and the risk of AIDS infection. His work has repeatedly portrayed daily routines of gay life, often based on personal experiences of himself and his friends. He has also written works that deal centrally with heterosexuals (Der bewegte Mann, Hempels Sofa) and with religious themes, criticizing literalist readings of the bible (Prototyp and Archetyp) as well as Islamic fundamentalism (Dschinn Dschinn).

== Awards ==
- Joop Klepzeiker Prijs, 1988
- Best German comic creator, Grenoble, 1990
- Max-und-Moritz Prize, 1992
- Best International Comic Creator, Barcelona, 1992
- Bundesfilmpreis for the movie Der bewegte Mann, 1995
- Goldene Leinwand mit Stern for the movie Der bewegte Mann, 1995
- Goldener RIK, Köln, 2002
- Zivilcourage-Preis des Berliner CSD, Berlin, 2004
- Prix Alph’Art, Angoulême, 2005
- Premio miglior storia lunga, 2005
- Max-und-Moritz Prize, 2006
- Max-und-Moritz Prize, 2010

== Works ==
=== Comics ===
- Sarius, 1981
- Das sensationelle Comic-Book, 1981
- SchwulComix (Gay Comics), 1981
- SchwulComix 2 (Gay Comics 2), 1984
- Macho Comix (Macho Comix), 1984
- SchwulComix 3 (Gay Comics 3), 1985
- SchwulComix 4 (Gay Comics 4), 1986
- Der bewegte Mann (Maybe...Maybe Not), 1987
- Lysistrata, 1987
- Pretty Baby (Maybe...Maybe Not Again!, sequel to Der bewegte Mann), 1988
- Kondom des Grauens (The Killer Condom), 1988
- Comics, Cartoons, Critzeleien, 1988
- Safere Zeiten (Safer Times), 1988
- Beach Boys, 1989
- Prall aus dem Leben (Life to the Full), 1989
- Bis auf die Knochen (Down to the Bone), 1990 (sequel to Kondom des Grauens)
- Heiße Herzen (Flaming Hearts), 1990 (with Detlev Meyer)
- Zitronenröllchen (Lemon cake), 1990
- Schwulxx-Comix (Gay Comix), 1990 (with Walter Moers)
- Deutsche Tuntenpost, 1991
- Bullenklöten! (Bull's Balls), 1992
- ...und das mit links!, 1993
- Konrad und Paul, 1993
- Konrad und Paul 2, 1994
- Konrad und Paul 3, 1997
- Jago, 1998
- Superparadise, 1999 (sequel to Bullenklöten)
- Poppers! Rimming! Tittentrimm!, 2001
- Wie die Karnickel (like bunnies), 2002
- Sie dürfen sich jetzt küssen, 2003 (Third part of Bullenklöten)
- Suck my duck, 2004
- Roy und Al, 2004
- Dschinn Dschinn: Der Zauber des Schabbar, 2005
- Dschinn Dschinn 2: Schleierzwang im Sündenpfuhl, 2006
- Trojanische Hengste, 2006
- Hempels Sofa, 2007
- Stutenkerle, 2008
- Prototyp, 2008
- Archetyp, 2009
- Antityp, 2010
- Der Dicke König, 2011
- Elftausend Jungfrauen, 2012
- Herbst in der Hose, 2017
- Santa Claus Junior, 2017
- Stehaufmännchen, 2019

==== English translations ====
Some of König's books have been translated into English. First was Kondom des Grauens, published as The Killer Condom (1991, reprint 2009). The two-part book Der bewegte Mann/Pretty Baby appeared as Maybe... Maybe Not (1998)/Maybe... Maybe Not Again! (1999). Later translations include Bullenklöten as Bull's Balls (2002), Roy und Al as Roy & Al (2006) and Down to the Bone (2011).

=== Films ===
- Der bewegte Mann, 1994
- Kondom des Grauens, 1996 (script by Ralf König)
- Wie die Karnickel, 2002 (script by Ralf König)
- Lisístrata, Spain 2002 (following Lysistrata)

== Documentary ==
A 2012 German documentary film directed by Rosa von Praunheim named König des Comics follows König's life and work. Besides König, those interviewed include Hella von Sinnen, Ralph Morgenstern, Joachim Król as well as friends and admirers of the cartoonist, like a Swiss fan who visits his beloved writer, a couple of friends who played important roles during König's youth, a comic book seller etc. The film also includes clips from König's comic public readings. It was screened at various festivals such as Berlin, Buenos Aires, and San Sebastian. It reached a wider audience than most of von Praunheim's documentaries and it is available for streaming on digital platforms.
