= Heinrich Schmieder =

German actor (1970–2010)

- Born: 14 February 1970; Schwäbisch Hall, West Germany
- Died: 21 July 2010 (aged 40); Livigno, Italy
- Occupation: Actor
- Years active: 1991–2010
- Children: 2

Heinrich Schmieder (14 February 1970 – 21 July 2010) was a German actor.

== Life ==
Heinrich Schmieder was the son of Albanian-Banatdeutsch immigrants. From 1991 to 1994 he studied acting at the private Zinner Studio in Munich.

From 1999 to 2001, Schmieder had the role of the Commissioner Tobias von Sachsen in the TV series Tatort broadcast by Radio Bremen. He appeared alongside Heino Ferch and Sebastian Koch in the internationally successful 2001 TV movie The Tunnel in the role of Theo Lohmann. In 2003 he was nominated for a German Television Award for best actor. In 2004 he was directed by Oliver Hirschbiegel in the role of Rochus Misch in the Oscar-nominated film Downfall. He joined the German Film Academy in 2005.

Schmieder was found dead on 21 July 2010, at the age of 40, by his teammate, in a hotel in Livigno, Italy, while participating in the Bike Transalp. He left behind a wife and two children. The cause of his death is unknown.

== Filmography (selection) ==
- 1992-2006: Tatort (TV series, five episodes) – Kommissar Tobias von Sachsen / Ralf Schaufler / Kalle Seidel
- 1992: Wir Enkelkinder – Mephisto
- 1995-1996: Against the Wind (TV series) – Boje
- 1997: Babes' Petrol – Young Man
- 1997: Ein Held – Polizist 2
- 1998: The Bubi Scholz Story – Klaus Eckleben – jung
- 2000: Anniversaries – Thorsten
- 2001: The Tunnel – Theo Lohmann
- 2001: Dead Man – Richard
- 2002: Like Rabbits – Hubert
- 2002: Extreme Ops – Goran
- 2003: Man Bites Fashion – Tom
- 2004: Hunger for Life – Günter
- 2004: Downfall – Rochus Misch
- 2004: The Fall – Dino
- 2005: Margarete Steiff – Lehrer
- 2005-2008: A Case for BARZ (TV series)
- 2006: Warchild – Tony
- 2006: Suspect (TV series, episode:A New Life) – Walter Krohn
- 2007: Prague Embassy – Frank Ziesche
- 2008: The Suspicion (Short Film) – Udo
- 2008: So – Lohman
- 2008: The Legend of Brandner Kaspar – Pfarrer
- 2009: Hitler in Court – Hans Ehard
- 2009: Flight into the Night – The Accident at Überlingen – Bernd Wegmann
- 2010: Metropolitan Area (TV series, one episode) – Gerd Banzer

== Awards ==
- Nominated German Television Award
