= The Diver (play) =

The Diver is a dramatic play written in 2008 by Hideki Noda and Colin Teevan. It premiered in London in 2008 at the Soho Theatre and the US premiere occurred in 2010 at The University of Michigan. The play combines a modern psychiatric case with traditional Japanese Noh theatre and includes elements of the world's first novel, The Tale of Genji and a Noh play, Ama (also the term for Japanese pearl divers).

== Plot ==
The show focuses around a Japanese woman named Yumi Yamanaka who is accused of murdering her lover's two children. As she spends time with a Psychiatrist, she drifts in and out of reality and assumes characters from both The Tale of Genji and Ama while a Prosecutor and the Chief of Police work to determine her guilt.

== Productions ==
The Diver was originally performed from June 19 to July 19, 2008, under the direction of Hideki Noda. The cast included Kathryn Hunter, Hideki Noda, Harry Gostelow, and Glyn Pritchard. The production team included Denzaemon Tanaka as composer, design by Catherine Chapman, lighting design by Christoph Wagner, and sound design by Paul Arditti.

The first production in the US of The Diver was performed at the University of Michigan from October 21–23 in 2010 under the direction of Rebecca Spooner.
