= Wehrmachthelferin =

Military unit in Nazi Germany

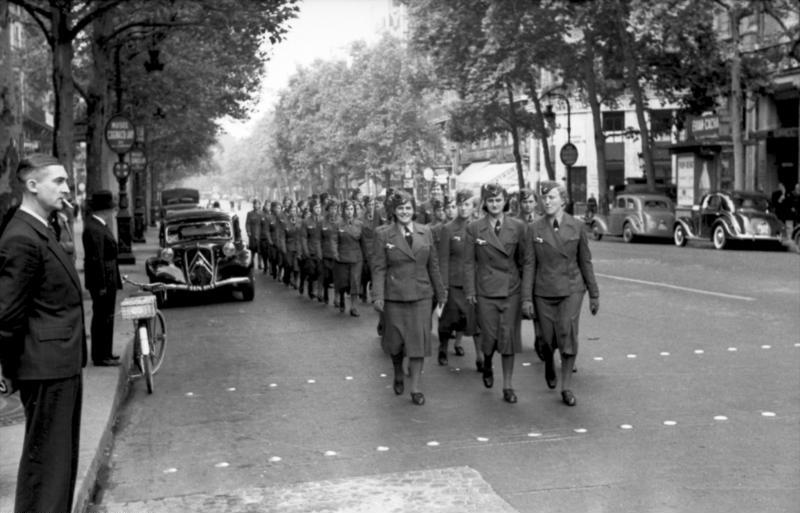
Wehrmachthelferinnen in occupied Paris, 1940

Wehrmachthelferin ('female Armed Forces helper', plural -innen) was the name for girls and young women who served during the Second World War with the German Wehrmacht as auxiliaries.

== History ==
In the beginning, women in Nazi Germany were not involved in the Wehrmacht, as Adolf Hitler ideologically opposed conscription for women, stating that Germany would "not form any section of women grenade throwers or any corps of women elite snipers." However, with many men going to the front, women were placed in auxiliary positions within the Wehrmacht, called Wehrmachtshelferinnen (transl. Female Wehrmacht helpers), participating in tasks such as:

- telephone, telegraph and transmission operators,
- administrative clerks, typists and messengers,
- operators of listening equipment, in anti-aircraft defense, operating projectors for anti-aircraft defense, employees within meteorology services, and auxiliary civil defense personnel
- volunteer nurses in military health service (similar to the role of women working with the German Red Cross or other voluntary organizations).

They took part, under the same authority as prisoners of war (Hiwis), as auxiliary personnel of the army (Behelfspersonal) and they were assigned to duties not only within the heart of the German Reich, but also within the German-occupied territories, for example in the General government of Poland, in France, in Spain and later in Yugoslavia, in Greece and in Romania.

By 1945, 500,000 women were serving as Wehrmachtshelferinnen, half of whom were volunteers, while the other half performed obligatory services connected to the war effort (Kriegshilfsdienst).

== In the media ==
- 1958 Blitzmädels an die Front, directed by Werner Klingler.

== See also ==
- Ranks and insignia of the German Women’s Auxiliary Services
