= Johannes W. Betz =

German screenwriter

Johannes W. Betz is a German screenwriter and writer who works in the German language.

Ty Burr, film critic for The Boston Globe, called his film The Tunnel "a breakout success." He also worked on The Spiegel Affair.
