= Ranks and insignia of the German Women's Auxiliary Services =

The ranks and insignia of German Women's Auxiliary Services were the ranks given to women who served in the German military and paramilitary forces during World War II.

== Wehrmacht ==
The first female auxiliary service in the Wehrmacht was the Army signals communications female auxiliaries, formed on 1 October 1940. Others followed suit, in the army and in the other services. Until December 1941, recruitment was by volunteer enlistment, but by that date unmarried women in the age group 18–40 years could be drafted into auxiliary service. All female auxiliary services were uniformed and under military discipline, with free rations, quarters and clothing. Yet, they were paid according to civil service pay rates and were not considered members of the armed forces, but auxiliaries of the armed forces. Their ranks did not correspond to military ranks.

=== Army ===
Nachrichtenhelferinnen (NH) des Heeres

Army signals communications female auxiliaries.

Insignia (1940–1942)										No insignia
Insignia (1940–1942)			NH-Hauptführerin	NH-Oberführerin	NH-Führerin	NH-Unterführerin		NH-Oberhelferin		Nachrichtenhelferin
Insignia (1942–1945)										No insignia
Insignia (1942–1945)	NH-Oberstabsführerin	NH-Stabsführerin	NH-Hauptführerin	NH-Oberführerin	NH-Führerin	NH-Unterführerin	NH-Haupthelferin	NH-Oberhelferin	NH-Vorhelferin	Nachrichtenhelferin

=== Navy ===
Insignia									No insignia
Insignia	Marineoberstabsführerin	Marinestabsführerin	Marinehaubtführerin	Marineoberführerin	Marineführerin	Marinehaupthelferin	Marineoberhelferin	Marinevorhelferin	Marinehelferin

=== Air force ===
Flugmeldediensthelferinnen (FMDH)

Female air warning service auxiliaries

Insignia (6 July 1940–2 August 1940)						No insignia
Insignia (6 July 1940–2 August 1940)		Hauptgruppenführerin (Senior work group officer)	Betriebsgruppenführerin (Work group officer)	Aufsicht (Warden, supervisor)	Helferin (Female auxiliary)	Anwärterin (Applicant)
Insignia (2 August 1940–26 February 1941)						No insignia
Insignia (2 August 1940–26 February 1941)	Kameradschaftsführerin (Comradeship leader)	Betriebsgruppenführerin (Work group officer)	Betriebsgruppenunterführerin (Work group junior officer)	Aufsichtshelferin (Female supervisor auxiliary)	Flugmeldehelferin (Female air warning auxiliary)	Anwärterin (Applicant)

On 26 February 1941, the Flugmelde-Helferinnen were incorporated into the Luftnachrichtenhelferinnen (Luftwaffe female signals communications auxiliaries).

Luftnachrichtenhelferinnen (LNH)

Insignia
Luftnachrichten-Flugmelde	Luftnachrichten-Flugmelde-Stabsführerin	Luftnachrichten-Flugmelde-Hauptführerin	Luftnachrichten-Flugmelde-Oberführerin	Luftnachrichten-Flugmelde-Führerin
Luftnachrichten-Betriebs			Luftnachrichten-Betriebs-Oberführerin	Luftnachrichten-Betriebs-Führerin
Insignia
Luftnachrichten-Flugmelde	Luftnachrichten-Flugmelde-Haupthelferin (major plane spotter auxiliary)	Luftnachrichten-Flugmelde-Oberhelferin (senior plane spotter auxiliary)	Luftnachrichten-Flugmelde-Helferin (plane spotter auxiliary)	Luftnachrichten-Flugmelde-Anwärterin (applicant)
Luftnachrichten-Betriebs	Luftnachrichten-Betriebs-Haupthelferin (major plane spotter auxiliary)	Luftnachrichten-Betriebs-Oberhelferin (senior plane spotter auxiliary)	Luftnachrichten-Betriebs-Helferin (plane spotter auxiliary)	Luftnachrichten-Betriebs-Anwärterin (applicant)

Flakwaffenhelferinnen

Female anti-aircraft auxiliaries 1944.

Insignia								No insignia
Insignia	Flakw. Stabsführerin	Flakw. Hauptführerin	Flakw. Oberführerin	Flakw. Führerin	Flakw. Obertruppführerin	Flakw. Truppführerin	Flakw. Oberhelferin	Flakw. Helferin

Luftschutzwarndiensthelferinnen

Civil defence air-raid warning service female auxiliaries.

Insignia					No insignia
Insignia	LS-Warndienst-Oberführerin	LS-Warndienst-Führerin	LS-Warndienst-Hapthelferin	LS-Warndienst-Oberhelferin	LS-Warndienst-Helferin

=== Wehrmachthelferinnenkorps ===
On 29 November 1944 all female auxiliary organizations, except the Civil defence air-raid warning service female auxiliaries, were merged into one corps, the Wehrmacht Female Auxiliary Corps.

Insignia										No insignia
Insignia	Oberstabsführerin	Stabsführerin	Hauptdienstführerin	Oberdienstführerin	Dienstführerin	Obertruppführerin	Truppführerin	Haupthelferin	Oberhelferin	Helferin

== Ordnungspolizei ==
Helferinnen der Ordnungspolizei

During the war, the female civilian employees of the Ordnungspolizei were augmented with drafted female police auxiliaries; Stabshelferinnen performed office work, Nachrichtenhelferinnen worked with signals communications, while Kraftfahrhelferinnen drove automobiles.

Rank insignia for Female Police Auxiliaries was introduced in 1944. The three ranks were Führerin, Unterführerin and Helferin.

Feuerwehr-Helferinnen

Female fire fighting auxiliaries were drafted into the fire service from 1943.

Rank insignia for Female Fire Fighting Auxiliaries was introduced in 1944.

Insignia					No insignia
Insignia	Kreishelferin d. Fw.	Unterkreishelferin d. Fw.	Haupthelferin d. Fw.	Oberhelferin d. Fw.	Helferin d. Fw.

== Paramilitary ==
=== Female Reich Labour Service, Auxiliary War Service ===
During the war, the six months mandatory service in the Female Reich Labour Service was extended with another six months in the Kriegshilfsdienst (the auxiliary war service). The auxiliary war service of RAD was prolonged with another six months in April 1944, and at the end of November all time limits for service were removed. The majority of the additional draft of 150,000 young women were to serve in the Luftwaffe air defenses. They should not be confused with the Flakwaffenhelferinnen of the Luftwaffe. They formed special RAD-Flak units with RAD uniforms. While female Wehrmacht personnel saw extensive deployment throughout German-occupied Europe, members of the RAD Auxiliary War Service only served within the borders of Germany.

Insignia										No insignia
Insignia	Stabshauptführerin*	Stabsoberführerin*	Stabsführerin*	Maidenhauptführerin*	Maidenoberführerin*	Maidenführerin*	Maidenunterführerin*	Jungführerin	Kameradschaftsälteste	Arbeitsmaid
* = professional leaders

== Bibliography ==
- Absalon, Rudolf (1995). Die Wehrmacht im Dritten Reich: 19. Dezember 1941 bis 9. Mai 1945 (in German). H. Boldt. ISBN 978-3764619404.
- Cassin-Scott, Jack (1980). Women at War. Osprey Publishing. ISBN 978-0850453492.
- Davis, Brian L. (2001). Uniforms and Insignia of the Luftwaffe, Vol 2 (in German). Stuttgart: Motorbuch Verlag. ISBN 978-1854091079.
- Deuster, Dieter (2009). Deutsche Polizei-Uniformen 1936-1945 (in German). Motorbuch Verlag. ISBN 978-3613031050.
- Heineman, Elisabeth D. (1999). What Difference Does a Husband Make?: Women and Marital Status in Nazi and Postwar Germany. University of California Press. ISBN 978-0520937314.
- Kompisch, Kathrin (2008). Täterinnen: Frauen im Nationalsozialismus (in German). Böhlau Verlag. ISBN 978-3412201883.
- Krimmer, Elisabeth (2018). German Women's Life Writing and the Holocaust. Cambridge University Press. ISBN 978-1108563758.
- Maubach, Franka (2009). Die Stellung halten: Kriegserfahrungen und Lebensgeschichten von Wehrmachthelferinnen (in German). Vandenhoek & Ruprecht. ISBN 978-3525361672.
- Amtliches Werk (1943). Reichsgesetzblatt Teil I (in German). Reichsministerium des Innern.
- Schlicht, Adolf; Angolia, John R. (1999). Die deutsche Wehrmacht - Uniformierung und Ausrüstung 1933-1945, Band 3: Die Luftwaffe (in German). Stuttgart: Motorbuch Verlag. ISBN 978-3613020016.
- United States War Department (1945). Handbook on German military forces, part I (TM-E 30-451). Washington, DC: United States Government Printing Office.
- Williamson, Gordon (2003). World War II German Women's Auxiliary Services. Osprey Publishing. ISBN 978-1841764078.
