= Hayashiya =

Hayashiya is a surname. Notable people with the surname include:

- Kikuō Hayashiya (born 1937), Japanese comedian
- Sanpei Hayashiya I (1925–1980), Japanese comedian
- Hayashiya Sanpei II (born 1970), Japanese comedian
- Hayashiya Shōzō IX (born 1962), Japanese storyteller, actor, and voice actor
