= Katsura =

Katsura or Katsuura may refer to:

== Architecture ==
- The Katsura imperial villa, one of Japan's most important architectural treasures, and a World Heritage Site

== Botany ==
- Katsura, the common name for Cercidiphyllum, a genus of two species of trees native to eastern Asia

== Geography ==
- Katsuura, Chiba, city located in Chiba Prefecture, Japan
- Katsura, Tokushima, a town in Tokushima Prefecture, Japan
- Katsura, Ibaraki, a former village in Ibaraki Prefecture, Japan
- Katsura River, a Japanese river
- Katsura, the name of the upper reaches of Sagami River
- Katsura, Kyoto, a suburb of Kyoto City in Kyoto Prefecture, Japan

== People ==
- Marquess Katsura Taro (1848–1913), Japanese Prime Minister 1901–1906, 1908–1911, 1912–1913
- Katsura Hattori (服部 桂; born 1951), Japanese editor
- Hiromi Katsura (桂 宏美; born 1975), Japanese singer
- Katsura Kogorō (桂 小五郎; 1833–1877), a former name of Kido Takayoshi during the late Tokugawa period.
- Masakazu Katsura (桂 正和; born 1962), Japanese manga artist
- Masako Katsura (桂 マサ子; 1913–1995), Japanese carom billiards player
- Hoshino Katsura (星野 桂; born 1980), a Japanese manga artist
- Katsura Shinnosuke (桂 伸乃介; 1952–2020), Japanese rakugoka
- Prince Katsura (桂宮宜仁親王; 1948–2014), cousin of Emperor Akihito
- Katsura Bunshi VI (六代 桂 文枝; born 1943), Japanese TV presenter
- Shijaku Katsura II (2代目 桂 枝雀; 1939–1999), Japanese rakugo performer
- Katsura Sunshine (桂 三輝; born 1970), Canadian traditional Japanese rakugo comic storyteller
- Katsura Utamaru (桂 歌丸; 1936–2018), Japanese rakugo comedian
- Katsura Sato (佐藤 桂; born 1989), Japanese biathlete

== Fictional characters ==
- Hinagiku Katsura from the Hayate the Combat Butler anime and manga
- Kotaro Katsura from the Gintama anime and manga
- Mafune Katsura in the film Terror of Mechagodzilla
- Kotonoha Katsura from the visual novel School Days
- Katsura Tenjoin from YAT Anshin! Uchū Ryokō

== Other ==
- Katsura-no-miya, a branch of the Japanese Imperial Family
