= Makate Asai =

Japanese writer

- 朝井 まかて
- Born: 1959 (age 66–67); Habikino, Osaka, Japan
- Education: Konan Women's University
- Occupations: Writer, novelist
- Writing career
- Language: Japanese
- Genres: Fiction; Historical fiction
- Notable works: Nukemairu; Renka; Oranda Saikaku; Kurara
- Notable awards: Naoki Prize; Oda Sakunosuke Prize

Makate Asai (朝井 まかて, Asai Makate) is a Japanese writer of historical fiction. She has won the Naoki Prize and the Oda Sakunosuke Prize, and two of her novels have been adapted for television by NHK.

== Early life and education ==
Asai was born in 1959 in Habikino, Osaka, Japan. After graduating from Konan Women's University she took a job writing copy for advertising.

== Career ==
Asai made her literary debut in 2008 with Mi sae hana sae (実さえ花さえ), which won the Shōsetsu Gendai Novel Newcomer Encouragement Prize from Kodansha. She chose the pen name "Makate" to honor her Okinawan grandmother. More novels followed, including the 2010 novel Chanchara (ちゃんちゃら) and the 2012 novel Nukemairu (ぬけまいる), which NHK later adapted into a television series starring Rena Tanaka, Rie Tomosaka, and Eriko Sato.

In 2014 Asai won both the Naoki Prize and the Oda Sakunosuke Prize, but for different books. Her 2013 novel Renka (恋歌, Love Song), a story based on the life of the poet Nakajima Utako, won the 150th Naoki Prize, which she shared with Kaoruko Himeno. Her book Oranda Saikaku (阿蘭陀西鶴), a story based on the life of the poet Ihara Saikaku, won the 31st Oda Sakunosuke Prize.

Her novel Kurara (眩), about the relationship between the painter Katsushika Ōi and her father, the painter Hokusai, was published in 2016. Kurara won the 22nd Gishū Nakayama Literature Prize, and was adapted into the 2017 NHK television movie Kurara: The Dazzling Life of Hokusai's Daughter (眩 ～北斎の娘～, Kurara ~Hokusai no Musume~) starring Aoi Miyazaki.

== Recognition ==
- 2018 Osaka Culture Prize
- 2008 3rd Shōsetsu Gendai Novel Newcomer Encouragement Prize
- 2014 150th Naoki Prize (2013下)
- 2014 31st Oda Sakunosuke Prize
- 2016 22nd Gishū Nakayama Literature Prize

== Television adaptations ==
- Kurara: The Dazzling Life of Hokusai's Daughter (眩 ～北斎の娘～, Kurara ~Hokusai no Musume~), NHK, 2017
- Nukemairu ~Onna sannin Ise mairi (ぬけまいる~女三人伊勢参り), NHK, 2018

== Works ==
- Mi sae hana sae (実さえ花さえ), Kodansha, 2008, ISBN 9784062150422
- Chanchara (ちゃんちゃら), Kodansha, 2010, ISBN 9784062164207
- Nukemairu (ぬけまいる), Kodansha, 2012, ISBN 9784062180023
- Love Song (恋歌, Renka), Kodansha, 2013, ISBN 9784062185004
- Oranda Saikaku (阿蘭陀西鶴), Kodansha, 2014, ISBN 9784062191418
- Kurara (眩), Shinchosha, 2016, ISBN 9784103399711
