= Natsuki Okamoto (actress, born 1965) =

Japanese television personality (born 1965)

- 岡本 夏生
- Born: 12 September 1965 (age 60); Shizuoka Prefecture, Japan
- Other name: Yūki Hayakawa (stage name during first appearance on TV)
- Occupations: Television personality; actress
- Years active: 1986–
- Modeling information
- Height: 165.4 cm (5 ft 5 in) (2010)

Natsuki Okamoto (岡本 夏生, Okamoto Natsuki; born 12 September 1965) is a Japanese tarento, race queen and gravure idol. Her real name is Sachiko Kanemura (金村 幸子, Kanemura Sachiko).

Currently, she works freelance rather than being associated with an agency.

== Life and career ==
She was born in Aoi-ku, Shizuoka, Shizuoka Prefecture. She is the fifth of six siblings (with three brothers and two sisters). After graduating from high school, she joined a modeling club in Shizuoka Prefecture and debuted as a local model with the stage name Chinatsu Murakami (村上千夏, Murakami Chinatsu). Starting in April 1986, she made regular appearances for one year on the late-night informational programme Jōhō Kōsaten Do! at the local station TV Shizuoka. At that time, she used the stage name Yuki Hayakawa (早川 ゆうき, Hayakawa Yūki).

She left the aforementioned programme and went to Tokyo in May 1987, and changed the agency she worked with. She made her nationwide debut on 11PM. She changed to her current stage name of Natsuki Okamoto.

In 1989, she became the race queen of Nissin Cup Noodle Racing Team, made her full debut as a celebrity with her appearance to Waratte Iitomo!, and became widely known as the High Leg Queen (ハイレグ女王, Hai Regu Joō) (

In the 1990s, she became widely active as a sexy-type of tarento in a similar vein as Ai Iijima and Aya Sugimoto. She also appeared on dramas as an actress.

In 1991, she starred in the Toei V-Cinema direct-to-video film Joshū Sasori: Satsujin Yokoku (女囚さそり 殺人予告), an installment of the Joshū Sasori series, where she gained popularity. She was scheduled to star again in the full cinema version of the film, but it was canceled when she stepped down from the role. The reasons given for her resignation were the decision to take a break for her health and arguments over her refusal to go nude. She used this opportunity to put her entertainment work on hold, during which time there were reports on theories regarding her mental health as well as her severe weight loss. She changed agencies during this time.

After that, she became a regular on the television variety programme, Hey! Say! A Board of Education, where she acted like an airhead and often gave off-the-wall responses. She shifted from being a tarento selling her sex appeal to a casual character up for anything.

In June 1995, she caused a scene at her hotel which resulted in police being dispatched, leading to talk about her. This was followed closely by a report of her causing trouble returning items at a cosmetics store, resulting in articles claiming there was a plan to eliminate her from the entertainment industry. That same year, it was reported her staff broke away from her

She was removed from the show Shinkon-san Irasshai at the end of March 1996 due to her prioritizing her appearances on stage, after having appeared on the show since 1992. At the same time, she lost her status as a regular on the shows Hey! Say! A Board of Education, Ken Shimura no Daijōbudaa, and Monomane Ōzakettei-sen broadcast on Fuji Television, which left her with no regular positions on programs by April 1996. She received fewer offers for work during this period, and she looked back on that time as a period where she was "getting scolded."

Her television appearances were rare in the 2000s, but she appeared frequently in golf pro-am tournaments. She made regular appearances in the late-night television programme Yorubijo in April 2005. Prior to that in February of the same year, she appeared in Cream Nantoka as a mother in a skating rink. After that, she had almost no work until 2010, though she was regularly appearing at the local Shizuoka Asahi Television in Tobikkiri! Shizuoka during that period.

In September 2009, she made a guest appearance on a project modeled after the TV program, Ano Hito wa Ima!?, and tried to go on the show in a high-leg swimsuit similar to what she became known for wearing during her Nissin Cup Noodle Racing Team race queen years, but another member of the cast covered her with their coat.

She started a blog on 2 February 2010 at, time of 2:22:22. Despite being in her forties at the time, her blog received enough views to put it in first place for the most viewed gravure idol blog on Ameba Blog, resulting in a comeback for her with her entertainment appearances returning full scale that same year. She also resumed her work as a gravure idol, for which she became known as the oldest gravure idol as a woman in her 40s. She received several offers to appear on talk shows. She would often use a pun greeting referencing briefs (Konyanyachiwa~ Ohisashi buri-fu, Okamoto Natsuki desu). She also often put "mambo" at the end of her phrases such as "bikkuri mambo yo" (I'm shocked, mambo). She has spoken about how her catchphrase shitsurei bukkoki mambo (失礼ぶっこきマンボ) was something she thought up while she was not working.

She volunteered frequently in the aftermath of the Tōhoku earthquake and tsunami of 2011. In a blog post dated 7 June, she wrote something that many interpreted as meaning she would step down from her work as an entertainer, but she denied that possibility in a post on 12 June.

On 1 August 2013, she climbed to the peak of Mount Fuji, a goal she decided on due to her love of the mountain. Her experience was broadcast on the show 5-Ji ni Muchū! on 20 and 27 August 2013.

In March 2016, she stepped down as a regular from the Tuesday broadcast of Tokyo MX's 5-Ji ni Muchū!, a position she had held from October 2011.

In May 2017, she returned to television for the first time in a year for the special edition of Cream Nantoka broadcast by AbemaTV.

=== Stage name origin ===
"Oka" of Natsuki Okamoto came from her hometown Shizuoka, as well as from the professional golfer Ayako Okamoto who was active when Okamoto made her stage name. "Natsuki" she took from a co-worker who used the name as her hostess name when the two worked at a hostess club in Ginza, because Okamoto liked the sound of the name.

She changed her stage name from Yūki Hayakawa to Natsuki Okamoto because there was a more established entertainer named Youki Kudoh at the entertainment agency she was affiliated with. The agency told her the names were too similar and would be confusing, and therefore she needed to choose a new name. They gave her two hours to do so as they needed to print a promotional brochure.

== Controversies ==
=== Profile validity ===
The validity of the profiles Okamoto has released have been questioned, and the content has been described as self-purported.

==== Age misrepresentation ====
She originally lied about her age, claiming she was born in 1967, two years after her real date of birth. In February 1991, reports speculated she was actually 25 years old, not 23, at which point she changed her profile to reflect her real date of birth.

In 1995, the magazine Shūkan Josei printed a rumor that she was 35 years old. Two years later on 3 February 1997, she ate 37 beans at the Setsubun holiday on the television talk show Lion no Gokigenyou, a custom where you are meant to eat the number of beans matching your age. This implied she was 37 years old. Later, in 2010, Okamata stated, "I was trying to eat a lot of beans at once to make people laugh."

She was again accused of lying about her age in 2000, and Okamoto maintained a stance that partway confirmed the suspicion, and the controversy subsided.

In the 2010s, she released an identity document to prove her date of birth, and during the broadcast of Jōhō Live Miyane-ya on 17 December 2010, she showed her drivers license showing her date of birth as 12 September 1965. Okamoto has gone as far as to tell others to go get her family register, speaking of how people refuse to believe her age even if she shows her health insurance certificate.

== Relationships ==
Okamata had a friendship with Izumi Sakai (Zard), a fellow race queen for the Nissin Cup Noodle Racing Team in 1990 and later singer. Sakai died unexpectedly in 2007.

She was a member of a unit, Hyōryū Gals, with Mitsuyo Ota, president of the entertainment company Titan, and Renhō, a politician, during their days as TV personalities. Later, Okamoto visitied Mitsuyo's house where she met Bakushō Mondai. The group broke up after that and have remained separated since.

Others she is close to are Aya Sugimoto, who is of the same generation and was active in entertainment during the same period, as well as Akira Hokuto who was a co-star on 5-Ji ni Muchū!.

== Trivia ==
- She lived in a house in Shizuoka when her career first took off and later purchased apartments in Gifu and Tokyo. She earned a living on rent income during the period when she was not working in the entertainment industry. Furthermore, in an interview published in the magazine Fujin Kōron on 22 November 2011, she said she had already run calculations planning to use rental income from her apartments if necessary.
- She has admitted to undergoing cosmetic surgery, but says she has not had breast implants. She also says she refuses to appear in adult videos.
- She has atopic dermatitis.
- Early on in the manga Crayon Shin-chan, Natsuki Okamoto along with Fumie Hosokawa and Komiya Etsuko are mentioned as favorite tarento of the main character, Shinnosuke Nohara. In addition, weather commentator Toshio Fukui and political critic Ryuichiro Hosokawa talked about how she was the only entertainment celebrity whose name they knew.

== Appearances ==
=== Variety and informational ===
- Jōhō Kōsaten Do! (SUT) Apr 1986—about 2 years, programme backup MC (her first television appearance under her first stage name of Yūki Hayakawa)
- Hey! Say! A Board of Education (Oct 1991 – Mar 1993, CX) – Appeared in nearly episode.
- Sekai no Chō Gōka Chinpin Ryōri (1991–96, CX) – Semi-regular
- Ken Shimura no Daijōbudaa (CX)
- Shinkon-san Irasshai (24 May 1992 – 31 Mar 1996, ABC) – 5th assistant
- Kaikai! Takada Byōin e Ikō (4 Oct 1992 – 28 Mar 1993, CTV) – moderator with Junji Takada (as Fuchō)
- Naruhodo! The World (1992–96, CX) – temporary reporter. She also appeared as a studio solver rarely.
- Roba no Mimi sōji (1994–96, NTV)
- Tensai Takeshi no Genki ga Deru TV (NTV) – Always appeared on site in a high-leg swimsuit as part of the "Busters" series.
- Sekaimaru Mie! TV Tokusō-bu (NTV) – Semi-regular in the first half of the 1990s
- Cream Nantoka (EX) – She was a regular on the Entertainment Cleverness Championships (Geinoukai Binkan Senshuken) section, while rarely appearing on other sections.
- Shirushiru Mishiru (EX) – Staff was the same as on Cream Nantoka. Was brand rep during 19 May 2010 broadcast programme.
- Tobikkiri! Shizuoka (SATV) – Occasional Friday appearances. She also appeared as a guest after her breaks.
- Monomane Ōzakettei-sen (CX)
- Ano Hito wa Ima!? (NTV) – reporter
- Super Jockey (NTV) – Occasional appearances
- Yorubijo (5 Apr 2003 – 31 Mar 2007, Sun TV) – Regular
- Doyō Special (TX) – Occasional appearances
- Naruhodo! High School (NTV) – Semi-regular
- Dynamic Tsūhan (2008, TBS) – Studio panellist
- Sunday Japon (2010, TBS) – On-site semi-regular
- 5-Ji ni Muchū! (4 Oct 2011 – 29 Mar 2016, Tokyo MX) – Tuesday regular

=== Dramas ===
- Nettaiya Academy / Misty Blue (1989, EX)
- Umiterashi (13 Nov – 4 Dec 1989, NHK)
- Sugishi Hi no Serenade (1989–90, CX)
- Ucchan Nanchan no Convenience Monogatari (1990, TX)
- Yonimo Kimyōna Monogatari "Yami no Seirei-tachi" (1990, CX)
- Dramatic 22 Jōdan Janai yo! My Home (26 Jan 1991, TBS)
- High Leg Queen Romance Pit ni Kakeru Koi! (23 Sep 1991, CX)
- Nandara Mandara (16 Oct – 18 Dec 1991, CX)
- Suteki ni Damashite! (15 Apr – 24 Jun 1992, NTV) – as Linda
- Tonosama Fūraibō Kakure Tabi (1994, EX) – as Okyo
- Otōsan wa Shinpaishō (12 Apr – 17 May 1994, EX)
- Konya, subete no Bar de (7 Jan 1995, NTV)
- Moto Rōnin Daikichi Hanayama (1 Apr 1995, EX)
- Hitori ni Shinai de (6 Jul – 21 Sep 1995, CX) – as Reiko Sakurai
- Doyō Drama Aki no Sentaku (23 Nov 1996, NHK)
- Doyō Wide Gekijō Sakura Fubuki Bijin Suri Sanshimai ga Iku (1997, EX) – as Katsumi Sakurafubuki (starring)
- Three Sisters Investigate Episode 8 "Hatsukoi wa Kiken na Yūkai!? Shikenmondai Tōnan ni Hime rareta Wana" (1998, NTV)
- Abarenbō Shōgun IX Episode 16 "Ōoku no Kaikaku Jō-sama, Ourami Itashimasu!" (1999, EX) – as Ukifune
- Asadora Watashi no Aozora (2000, NHK)
- Hagure Keiji Junjōha: Dai 14 Series Episode 2 "Yasuura Keiji ga Sakanaya ni Mukoiri!? Nioi o Kagu Onna" (2001, EX)
- Bōsan Bengoshi Muei Goda 1 (2003) – Naoe Yamamoto
- 13-sai no Hello Work Episode 1 (Jan 2012, EX) – as herself
- Toranaide Kudasai!! Gravure Idol Ura Monogatari Episode 11 (Mar 2012, TX) – as herself

=== Advertisements ===
- Showa Note Japonica Gakushū-chō
- Pizza-La
- Unilever
- Mizkan Ajipon – Co-starring Toshiyuki Nishida
- JKA Foundation Auto Sport
- Fuji-Q Highland
- Money Partners
- Kincho Gokiburi ga Inaku naru Spray
- Big – Co-starring Junji Takada
- She has also performed in multiple commercials in Shizuoka Prefecture (Kikuchi Kensetsu, Shizuoka Mitsubishi Motors, etc.) under her previous stage name while she was active in Shizuoka

=== Films ===
- Bakayaro! 3: Henna Yatsura Episode 3 "Kaisha o Name ru na" (1990) – as Nobuko Motoki
- Docchi Modocchi (1990) – as woman with red car
- Joshū Sasori Satsujin Yokoku V-Cinema (1991) – starring; as Nami Matsushima
- Dai Gekitotsu (1993)
- Mamushi no Kyōdai (1997) – as Ranko
- Katana Karu mono (2008) – as Kyoko Kobayakawa
- MR Iyaku Jōhō Tantōsha fourthstage Phase IV V-Cinema (14 Feb 2014)

=== Music videos ===
- Purple Days "Still think of you"
- Cascade "Yasashī Sagi-shi no Negoto no yō ni"
- Altima "Burst The Gravity"

=== Internet ===
- Natsuki ni Muchū! (2 Aug 2011 –, Abema Studio)
- Natsuki Okamoto Kisha Kaiken Tokyo Auto Salon 2012 with NAPAC (26 Feb 2012 –, WWS Channel)

=== Pachinko ===
- CR Natsuki Okamoto no Maboroshi no Suzume Jin Reika (2005, Masamura Yuki)

== Discography ==
=== Singles ===
- Suru No? Shinai No? / Ikenai Bosanoba (16 Dec 1990, CRDP-8)
- Gold / Urami-bushi (1 May 1991, CRDP-13)
- Kinu no Kutsushita / Oasis de Onemuri (21 Nov 1991, CRDP-27, is a cover song by Mari Natsuki)
- Sukidakara / Ai wa Kisetsu no naka de (1 Jul 1992, TODT-2874, Shinkon-san Irasshai theme song / duet with Katsura Sanshi (now Katsura Bunshi VI))

=== Albums ===
- Dakishimete (21 Jul 1990, CRCP-20006)
1. Dakishimete Destiny
2. Ikenai Bosanoba
3. Akuma no sasayaki
4. Natsu ga Kaeru Koro
5. TYO from N.Y.
6. Akuma no sasayaki
7. Aoi Chiheisen -Blue Horizon-
8. Motto Heart beat
9. Tasogare no Please
- Kinu no Kutsushita/Best Selection (21 Nov 1991, CRCP-20028)
1. Kinu no Kutsushita
2. Water Flower
3. Dakishimete Destiny
4. Savage Night
5. Urami-bushi
6. Suru No? Shinai No?
7. Oasis de Onemuri
8. Gold
- Talk Mans: Kyokyojitsujitsu Monogatari (21 Nov 1994, COCC-12072)

== Works ==
=== Photo albums ===
- Venus (20 Aug 1989 Kindaieigasha) ISBN 4-7648-1609-1
- Splash (10 Aug 1990 Wani Books) ISBN 4-8470-2150-9
- Giddy (24 Jun 1991 Hakusensha) ISBN 4-592-73097-6
- Hitomi no Doku (10 Nov 1992 Wani Books) ISBN 4-8470-2296-3
- Nudie (30 Aug 1992 Bauhaus) ISBN 4-89461-905-9

=== Videos ===
- Tropical Wind (20 Jul 1989 Tairiku Shobō) ISBN 4-8033-2129-9
- Sun Beam (6 May 1990 Tairiku Shobō) ISBN 4-8033-2713-0

=== DVD ===
- Nudie (14 Apr 2003 Bauhaus) ISBN 4-89461-724-2
