= 桂 =

桂 (Hanyu Pinyin: guì; Japanese pronunciation: kei/katsura) may refer to:

- The abbreviation for Guangxi
- Gui (surname)
- Cercidiphyllum japonicum, known in Japanese as katsura
- Guilin province
- Japanese destroyer Katsura

== See also ==
- Gui (disambiguation)
- Kei (disambiguation)
- Katsura (disambiguation)
