= San'yūtei =

Sanyutei may refer to:

- San'yūtei Enchō (1839–1900)
- San'yūtei Enraku V (1932–2009)
- San'yūtei Enraku VI (born 1950)
