= Masugi Shizue =

Japanese author

- 真杉 静枝
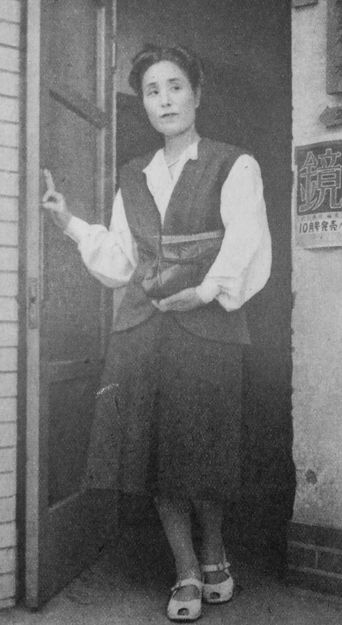
- Shizue Misugi, 1948
- Born: 3 October 1901; Denga Fukui, Japan
- Died: 29 June 1955 (aged 53); Tokyo
- Occupation: Author
- Notable work: Ekichō no wakaki tsuma; Kozakana no kokoro
- Movement: I-Novel

Japanese name
- Kanji: 真杉 静枝
- Hiragana: ますぎ しずえ
Transcriptions
- Romanization: Masugi Shizue

Masugi Shizue (真杉 静枝); born 3 October 1901 in Denga (today: Fukui prefecture); died 29. June 1955) was a Japanese author. Most of her works belong to the genre of Japanese "I-Novel" (Shishōsetsu).

== Life and work ==
Shizue was born in 1901 as an illegitimate daughter of a shinto priest in Denga (today Fukui prefecture). In 1908, she moved to Taiwan to be with her father, where he worked as high priest in a Shinto shrine. After a brief stay in Japan in 1911, the family returned to Taiwan. Shizue visited a nursing school, finishing her apprenticeship as a nurse in 1916 and subsequently started working in a hospital. She got married at 17 (Note: This marriage was never legally registered.) to a railway employee 13 years her senior, who worked at train station Taichung in Taiwan. In 1921 Shizue separated from him and went back to Ōsaka, Japan where she lived with her grandparents.

First Shizue was a stenographer, then she began to work as a journalist for the Mainichi Shimbun in Mainichi Shimbun. During this time she got to know author and stage performer Iruru Masaoka (1904–1958). She planned double suicide for love shinjū with him but it failed. In 1927 she became the lover of Mushanokōji Saneatsu. He encouraged her to write and so in the same year she published her first piece Ekichō no wakaki tsuma (駅長の若き妻, roughly: „The Stationmaster's young wife“) in number 8 of Daichōwa (大調和) magazine. After this she made her official debut in the world of literature with a novel called Kozakana no kokoro (小魚の心), which was equally valued by Saneatsu and Nakamura Chihei alike.

Shizue published a series of articles in a magazine called Josei geijutsu (女人藝術, roughly: „Women's Art“), edited by Shigure Hasegawa. After she got separated from Saneatsu, she had brief relationships with Kikuchi Kan and Nakamura Chihei, but married neither of them. With Nakamura she went to Taiwan again in 1939, where she stayed for the next 18 years. In 1942 she married the author Gishū Nakayama, and then divorced him four years later. Post-war she published a few pieces in the newspaper Kagami until this was cancelled after the third issue. After that she was responsible for an advice-column at Yomiuri Shimbun, targeted at young girls affected by the Atomic bombings of Hiroshima and Nagasaki (Hibakusha). John Hersey described her short stories as being about "the bitter loves and bitter solitude of women". While in Hiroshima, she started a campaign for funds in the Yomiuri for hibakusha girls to receive plastic surgery in Tokyo or Osaka.

In 1953 she travelled to Europe and saw the Coronation of Elizabeth II and took part in a meeting of the PEN International.

Shizue died in 1955 due to lung cancer in Koishikawa university hospital in Tokyo at age 53. Although she became a catholic before her death, she chose to be buried at Tōkei-ji in Kita-Kamakura

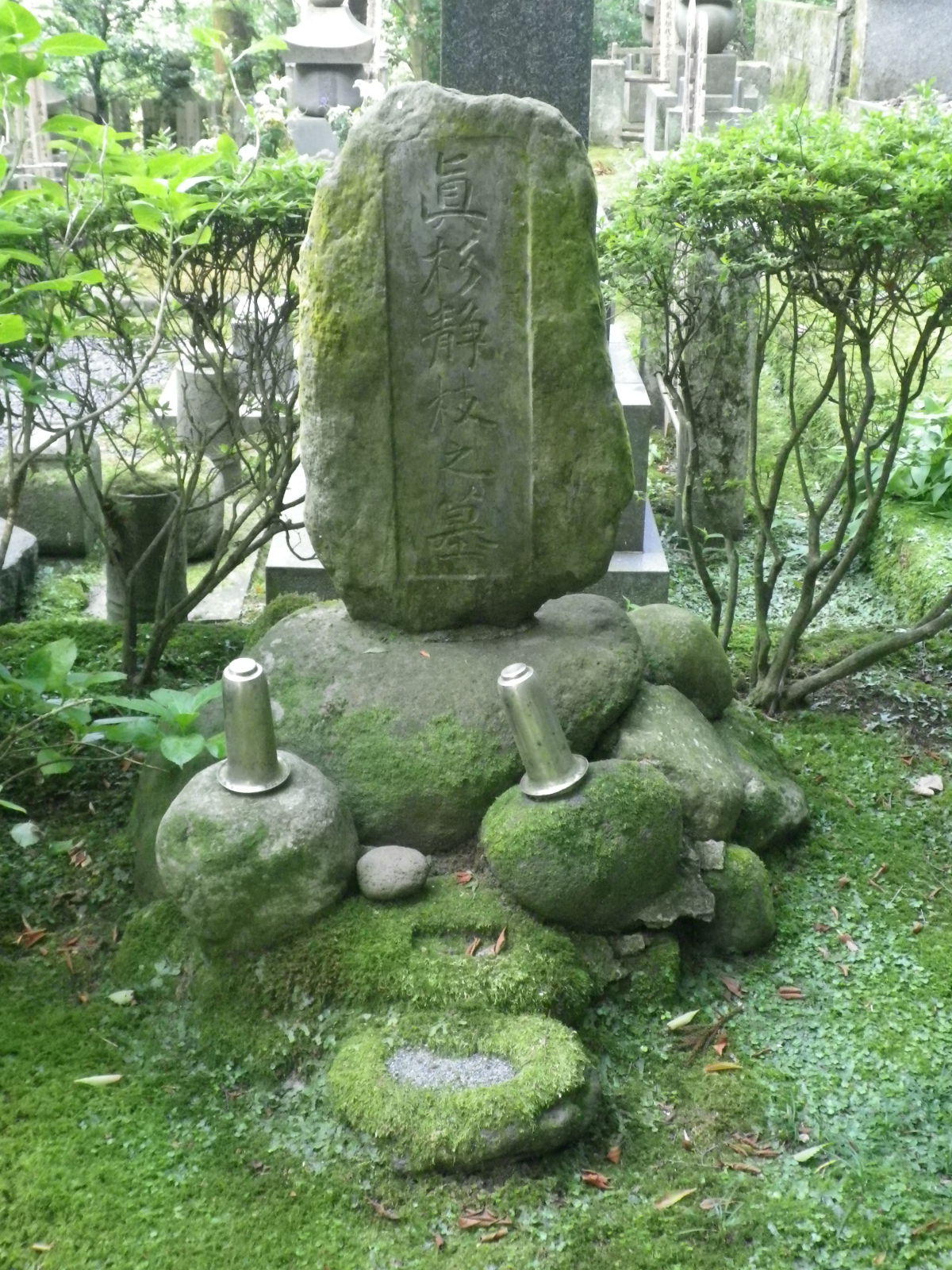
Shizue Masugi's grave.

founded in 1285 by a monk who felt sorry for women with cruel husbands.

== Works (Selection) ==
- 1939 Hinadori (ひなどり)
- 1940 Sono ato no kōfuku (その後の幸福)
- 1940 Aijō no mon (愛情の門)
- 1940 Rekishi monogatari hakkō no himemiya (歴史物語薄幸の姫宮)
- 1941 Nampo kikō (南方紀行)
- 1943 Haha to tsuma (母と妻)
- 1948 Kaen (花怨)
- 1948 Utsukushii hito (美くしい人)
