= Yasuha =

- Born: Yasuha Ebina (海老名 泰葉); January 17, 1961 (age 65); Taitō, Tokyo, Japan
- Occupations: Singer; songwriter; tarento; record producer
- Years active: 1981–1988; 2007–present
- Spouse: Shūnpūtei Koasa (m. 1988; div. 2007)
- Parent: Hayashiya Sanpei I (father)
- Relatives: Hayashiya Shōzō IX (brother); Hayashiya Sanpei II (brother)
- Musical career
- Genres: J-pop; city pop; Kayokyoku
- Instruments: Vocals; piano
- Labels: Polydor; Broadway; Universal Music; Iron Candles; Sanpeido; Yasuha Entertainment; Tsubasa Records
- Website: Yasuha Official Site & Blog

Yasuha Ebina (海老名 泰葉, Ebina Yasuha; born January 17, 1961) is a Japanese singer-songwriter, tarento and producer. She is known for her debut song "Fly-Day Chinatown" (1981) which peaked at number sixty-nine on the Oricon Weekly Singles Chart.

Born to rakugo performer Hayashiya Sanpei I, she established her singing career in 1981. She hosted the variety television program Gogo wa MaruMaru Omoikkiri TV (1987–1988). In 1988, Ebina retired from the entertainment business after her marriage to rakugo performer Shūnpūtei Koasa. After publicly divorcing Koasa in 2007, Ebina returned to the entertainment industry, founding the production company Iron Candle.

== Early life ==
Ebina was born on January 17, 1961, in Taitō, Tokyo, the second child of rakugo performer Hayashiya Sanpei I and novelist Kayoko Ebina. Her grandfather, Hayashiya Shōzō VII was also a rakugo performer, as well as her two brothers, Hayashiya Shōzō IX and Hayashiya Sanpei II. Her sister, Midori Ebina is a former actress. As a child, Ebina learned classical music, however, after failing to enter college of music, she began pursuing a career as a J-pop singer instead.

== Career ==
Ebina began her tarento career in 1979, appearing in numerous television and radio programs such as the Japanese television variety shows Variety Do Re Mi Fa So La Ti Do (1979–1982) and Gogo wa MaruMaru Omoikkiri TV (1987–1988).

Ebina established her singing career in 1981 with the release of her debut single "Fly-Day Chinatown" via Polydor Records. The song was a moderate success, peaking at number sixty-nine on the Oricon Weekly Singles Chart and selling approximately 56,000 copies. As a singer, she has released seven studio albums and two compilation albums as of June 2020. She has also written a few songs for other artists, including Shohjo-Tai's hit "Motto Charleston" (1986), which reached number sixteen in Japan.

In June 1988, Ebina married rakugo performer Shūnpūtei Koasa, and subsequently retired from the entertainment industry to support Koasa in his role as president of his production company, Haru Haru Dō. However, in November 2007, the couple announced their divorce in a press conference at the Imperial Hotel, Tokyo, and the relaunch of Ebina's entertainment career. Ebina drew mass public attention for publishing a book about the divorce, "Kaiun Rikon", and appearing in a professional wrestling match with Yoji Anjo. In November 2008, she released her first single in twenty-two years, "Ohisama yo Hohoende", via her own record label, Iron Candles.

== Personal life ==
Ebina married rakugo performer Shūnpūtei Koasa in June 1988 and retired from the entertainment business in order to support Koasa as his wife. Ebina and Koasa announced their separation on November 12, 2007, in a press conference.

== Discography ==
=== Albums ===
==== Studio albums ====
| Title | Album details |
|---|---|
| Transit | Released: November 1, 1981; Label: Polydor; Format(s): CD, LP |
| Vivid | Released: April 25, 1982; Label: Polydor; Format(s): LP |
| Waffusshigii. (わっ不っ思議ー。) | Released: June 11, 1982; Label: Polydor; Format(s): LP |
| Reserved | Released: March 25, 1983; Label: Polydor; Format(s): LP |
| Waffusshigii. Part.2 (わっ不っ思議ー。 Part.2) | Released: November 1, 1983; Label: Polydor; Format(s): LP |
| White Key | Released: September 5, 1984; Label: Polydor; Format(s): LP |
| Yahhoo! | Released: September 25, 1986; Label: Broadway; Format(s): CD, LP |

==== Compilation albums ====
| Title | Album details |
|---|---|
| Yasuha: Single Collection | Released: March 25, 1986; Label: Polydor; Format(s): CD |
| Golden Best Yasuha | Released: March 1, 2006; Label: Universal Music; Format(s): CD |

=== Singles ===
==== As a lead artist ====
| Title | Year | Album |
|---|---|---|
| "Fly-Day Chinatown" (フライディ・チャイナタウン) | 1981 | Transit |
| "Blue Night Blue" (ブルーナイト・ブルー) | 1982 | Vivid |
| "Mizuiro no One Piece" (水色のワンピース) | 1982 | Waffusshigii. |
| "Paul Poly Paula" (ポール・ポーリー・ポーラ) | 1983 | Yasuha: Single Collection |
| "Cool Town" | 1983 | Waffusshigii. Part.2 |
| "Natsu no Koi, Jealousy" (夏の恋・ジェラシー) | 1984 | White Key |
| "Shitamachi Swing" (下町スウィング) | 1984 | White Key |
| "Sincerely Yours" | 1986 | Yahhoo! |
| "Ohisama yo Hohoende" (お陽様よほほえんで) | 2008 | Non-album singles |
| "I Believe" | 2009 | Non-album singles |
| "Sakura Mau Hi wa" (桜舞う日は) | 2015 | Non-album singles |
| "Smile" | 2017 | Non-album singles |
| "Shinnai no Mythology" (深愛のmythology) | 2018 | Non-album singles |

=== Songwriting credits ===
| Title | Year | Artist | Album |
|---|---|---|---|
| "Meguro no Jikka e Kaerimasu" (目黒の実家へ帰ります) | 1986 | Yuko Igarashi | Non-album songs |
| "Fushigi nanowa Sayonara no Hoho" (不思議なのはサヨならの方法) | 1986 | Iyo Matsumoto | Tenshi no Baka |
| "Baby's Rock" | 1986 | Shohjo-Tai | Untouchable |
| "Yes It's My Heart" | 1986 | Shohjo-Tai | Untouchable |
| "Motto Charleston" (もっとチャールストン) | 1986 | Shohjo-Tai | ABCD... |
| "Misty Morning Stranger" | 1986 | Shohjo-Tai | Shohjo-Tai Complete Singles Forever 1984-1999 |
| Rubber Sole | 1986 | Shohjo-Tai | Shohjo-Tai Complete Singles Forever 1984-1999 |
| "Cheer Girl no Houkago" (チアガールの放課後) | 1987 | Shohjo-Tai | Zoo |

== Bibliography ==
| Date | Title | Publisher | Code |
|---|---|---|---|
| Feb 2008 | Kaiun Rikon (開運離婚) | Shogakukan | ISBN 4093637180 |

== Selected filmography ==
Television roles
| Year | Title | Role | Note |
|---|---|---|---|
| 1979–1982 | Variety Do Re Mi Fa So La Ti Do | Host | |
| 1987–1988 | Gogo wa MaruMaru Omoikkiri TV | Host | |
| 2009, 2012 | Beat Takeshi no Zettai Micha ikenai TV | Narrator | Also performed "Fly-Day Chinatown" |
