= Takezō =

- Gender: Male

Origin
- Origin: Japanese
- Meaning: Different meanings depending on the kanji used

Takezō, Takezo or Takezou (written: 武三 or 竹蔵) is a masculine Japanese given name. Notable people with the name include:

- Takezo Nakai (中井 武三; born 1949), Japanese handball player
- Takeso Shimoda (下田 武三; died 1995), Japanese politician, diplomat, judge and baseball commissioner
- Takezō Tachibanaya (橘家 竹蔵; born 1947), Japanese rakugo artist
- Miyamoto Musashi (宮本 武蔵; born c. 1584 – 13 June 1645), born Takezō Shinmen (新免 武蔵), Japanese swordsman, strategist, artist, and writer
