= Shōten =

Japanese TV series

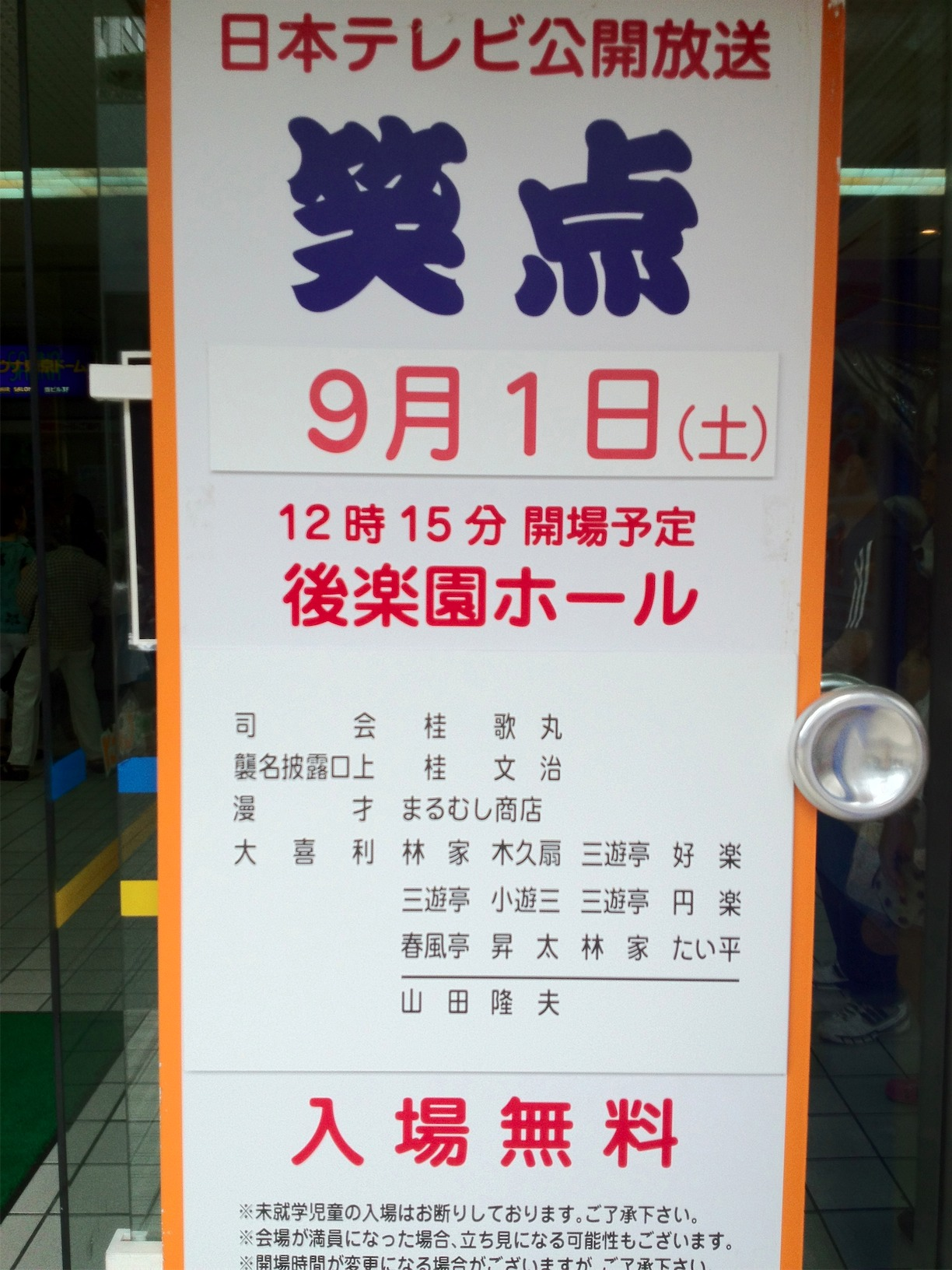
- NTV Shōten at Korakuen Hall in 2012
- Genre: Owarai, Variety show
- Directed by: Ken Obata, Jin Obata
- Starring: Shunpūtei Shōta (Host); San'yūtei Kōraku; San'yūtei Koyūza; Hayashiya Taihei; Katsura Miyaji; Shunpūtei Ichinosuke; Tatekawa Harenosuke; Takao Yamada
- Theme music composer: Hachidai Nakamura
- Country of origin: Japan
- Original language: Japanese

Production
- Executive producer: Motoi Umehara
- Production location: Korakuen Hall
- Running time: 30 minutes
- Production company: Nippon Television

Original release
- Network: NNS (NTV)
- Release: May 15, 1966 – present

Shōten (笑点; "Laughing Point") is a Japanese TV comedy program that has been continuously broadcast on Sunday evenings on Nippon TV since 15 May 1966, making it the second-longest running variety TV show in Japan.

== Format ==
The show is based on the Ogiri style of rakugo, a form of traditional Japanese storytelling. The ogiri system sees a host put questions to a panel of fellow rakugo storytellers who must produce a funny or witty response. Shoten's format thus sees the host—currently Shunpūtei Shōta—pose questions to six storytellers (known as "ogiri members") seated left to right (as the audience sees them) as follows: San'yūtei Koyūza (sky-blue kimono), Shunpūtei Ichinosuke (purple kimono), San'yūtei Kōraku (pink kimono), Tatekawa Harenosuke (cream kimono), Hayashiya Taihei (orange kimono), and Katsura Miyaji (yellow green kimono).

Rakugo performers such as Hayashiya Sanpei II, Katsura Utamaru,Hayashiya Kikuo, and San'yūtei Enraku VI were formerly part of the cast.

The rules are simple. In every 15-minute ogiri contest, the host will pose the ogiri members three questions. Each question can be answered an unlimited number of times by any member, and the custom is that everyone must answer each question at least once. Should a member wish to answer a question, he should simply raise his hand and wait to be called by the host. Should the resultant answer be funny or witty, the member will receive one or more floor cushions (zabuton) - the number increasing with the level of audience response and the host's own amusement or admiration. The floor cushion is brought to the stage by hapless sidekick Takao Yamada, formerly a successful popstar with the 70s idol group Zūtorubi, but now confined to an object of ridicule in his red kimono. Should, on the other hand, a member's answer fall flat with the audience, be excessively distasteful, or be construed as insulting to the host or fellow members, the member will lose one or more floor cushions. On some extreme occasions, the host may confiscate everyone's zabuton if he deems that all the members have conspired to humiliate him. This phenomenon is often referred by the public jokingly as a "genocide", and in most cases as an "Utamaru genocide", since previous host Katsura Utamaru was the first to order a complete confiscation of the entire cast's zabuton in 2006 after San'yūtei Enraku VI (then known as San'yūtei Rakutarō), in concert with the other members, compared the elderly host to a "talking corpse". Indeed, Enraku was particularly renowned during Utamaru's tenure as host for frequently insulting Utamaru with his characteristically merciless wit and accuracy, often resulting in the confiscation of all of his zabuton. It is also noteworthy that Utamaru's last act as a host was to commit a final "genocide" after San'yūtei Koyūza jokingly asked Utamaru to have sex with him, much to Utamaru's disgust.

The zabuton used are supposedly extra-heavy ones weighing 4 kg (9 pounds), so even a stack of ten or more will not topple. Should an ogiri member acquire 10 zabuton, he is entitled to that day's special prize, which is usually related to a famous quote, such as 'Boys, Be Ambitious'. Since Utamaru was notoriously keen on removing zabuton, especially from the intelligent yet arrogant Enraku, it is very rare for anyone to actually achieve the magical 10.

The show is also famous for its catchy theme music written by Hachidai Nakamura. This music has been continuously broadcast since 1969. The titles are written in edomoji, but were originally written to show an animated smiling face.

== See also ==
- Tatekawa Danshi - original host (1966–1969)
- San'yūtei Enraku V - former host (1983 - 2006)
- Katsura Utamaru - former host (2006 - 2016)
