= Shinkon-san Irasshai =

- Also known as: Welcome, Newlyweds
- Presented by: Bunshi Katsura VI
- Country of origin: Japan
- Original language: Japanese
- No. of episodes: 2, 231

Production
- Production company: Asahi Broadcasting Television

Original release
- Network: ANN (ABC TV, TV Asahi)
- Release: January 31, 1971

Shinkon-san Irasshai! (新婚さん、いらっしゃい; "Welcome, Newlyweds") is a Japanese talk show produced by ABC TV. The show is hosted by Bunshi Katsura VI and has run since January 1971. The show involves newlywed couples being interviewed by Katsura and a co-host. The current co-hostess is Mami Yamase.

A Vietnamese version of the program, Vợ Chồng Son, has been airing on Ho Chi Minh City Television since 2013, making it the first Asahi Broadcasting Television program to have an international version.

== Guinness World Record ==
In July 2015, the show was awarded a Guinness World Record as the longest-running talk show to be hosted by the same person.
