= Shunpūtei Shōta =

Japanese rakugo comedian (born 1959)

- 春風亭 昇太
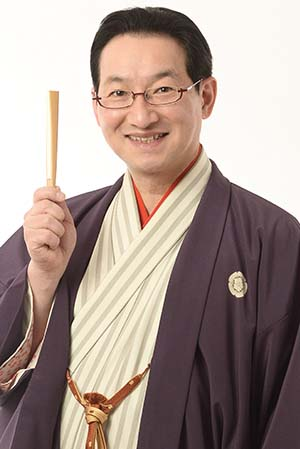
- Born: Yūji Tanoshita; December 9, 1959 (age 66); Shimizu-ku, Shizuoka, Shizuoka, Japan
- Education: Tokai University
- Notable work: Shōten

Comedy career
- Genre: Rakugo

Shunpūtei Shōta (春風亭 昇太; born December 9, 1959) is a Japanese rakugo comedian best known for performing on the Shōten comedy show on Nippon TV. He is known as a master of the Japanese comic art of rakugo, in which a single performer or storyteller appears on stage and tells comedic stories to the audience.

== Career ==
Shōta was born as Yūji Tanoshita (田ノ下 雄二, Tanoshita Yūji). In 1978, he entered Tokai University and joined the college rakugo club. His kōzamei (高座名; the stage name of rakugo) then was Tōkaitei Kirido (頭下位亭 切奴). When he was a student, he entered the Daigaku Taikō Rakugo Senshuken (大学対抗落語選手権; a championship tournament of Rakugo for college and university students) and won the championship.

In 1982, he left the university and became a disciple of Shunpūtei Ryūshō V (5代目春風亭 柳昇). He first used Shōhachi as his stage name. In 1986, he became futatsume (二ツ目; the middle rank of rakugo) and assumed his current stage name. In 1992, he was promoted to shinuchi (真打, shin'uchi; the senior rank of rakugo).

Since May 2006, he has appeared on Shōten as an ogiri (大喜利, ōgiri) member. On May 22, 2016, it was announced that he would become the sixth host in the show's 50-year history.

Shōta performs both classical repertoire and original material. During his performances, he often made use of his persona as unmarried bachelor, for which he used to get mocked by his fellow performers on Shōten. However, Shōta got married in 2019, after announcing the marriage on air.

== Kōzamei ==
- Shunpūtei Shōhachi (春風亭 昇八; 1982-1986)
- Shunpūtei Shōta (春風亭 昇太; 1986-)

== Filmography ==
=== Film ===
- Cape Nostalgia (2014)
- The Crimes That Bind (2018)
- Whistleblower (2019), Takami Iiyama
- The Setting Sun (2022)
- My Mom, My Angel: A Journey of Love and Acceptance (2024)

=== Television ===
- Tiger and Dragon (2005)
- Naotora: The Lady Warlord (2017), Imagawa Yoshimoto
- DCU: Deep Crime Unit (2022), Mamoru Hayakawa
