= Showko Showfukutei =

Japanese comedian and ventriloquist

Showko Showfukutei 笑福亭笑子
- Born: Kobe, Japan
- Occupations: Actor; Comedian; Ventriloquist; Rakugo Performer
- Organization: Kamigata Rakugo Association
- Family: Showfukutei
- Website: showkocomedy.com

Showko Showfukutei (笑福亭 笑子, Shōfukutei Shōko) is a Japanese actor, comedian, ventriloquist, professional rakugo performer (Japanese traditional comedy), actor, and based in Melbourne.

Showko trained in method acting at the Actors Lab based on the Lee Strasberg technique. Showko plays the role of Kimie in the feature film Saccharine premiering at the Sundance Film Festival and Berlin International Film Festival “a fine, touching performance.” - Variety

Showko is a professionally trained rakugo artist and is a member of the Kamigata Rakugo Association in Osaka.

She has lived and worked in London, Tokyo, Osaka, Singapore and regularly performs internationally, including the Edinburgh Fringe and Melbourne International Comedy Festival. Showko was a finalist on Australia's Got Talent appears in the Amazon Prime Video special Absolutely Normal.

== Early life ==
Showko was born in Kobe, Japan. She graduated from Kobe Yamate University with a degree in psychology.

Her interest in ventriloquism began in childhood, and she later worked at a local police station teaching traffic safety to children using a ventriloquist puppet at Hyogo Traffic Safety Association.

After three years in that role, she moved to Canada to study English. During her time there, she focused on language immersion. Upon returning to Japan, she trained as a professional radio announcer, a decision influenced by her experience listening to English-language radio during her studies abroad.

== Career ==
Prior to becoming a comedian, Showko was a radio presenter and DJ with regular programs for Radio Osaka, FM Uji, Yes FM and Beach Station FM in Japan, and later in Singapore at FM96.3 for MediaCorp.

Showko did her rakugo training with Rakugo Master Shōfukutei Kakushow to become a professional rakugo performer. Showko Showfukutei is a stage name awarded to her after completing a three-year Rakugo apprenticeship and she is the only fully trained professional rakugo performer living outside of Japan.

Showko has written, produced and performed shows at the Edinburgh Festival Fringe, Brighton Fringe (UK), Avignon Festival (France), Melbourne International Comedy Festival, Sushi Dictator, The Butterfly Club, Melbourne Fringe Festival, The Athenaeum Theatre and was directed by Heath McIvor for her latest show Absolutely Normal at the 2018 Melbourne International Comedy Festival at the Malthouse Theatre and the Adelaide Fringe receiving 5 star review.

Showko has appeared on a Japanese TV show Gooto Chikyu bin (グッと地球便) documenting her life and career, TV Tokyo Sekai Naze Sokoninihonjin (世界なぜそこに日本人海外で超有名人スペシャル). NHK Tsurube no Kazokini Kampai (鶴瓶の家族に乾杯), Singapore (Channel NewsAsia: “Primetime Morning”) and Australia on Australia's Got Talent 2016 as a finalist, ABC TV for the "International Women's Day Debate" as well as being interviewed on ABC National Radio with John Faine.
