= Isao Hashizume =

Japanese actor (born 1941)

- Born: 17 September 1941 (age 85); Osaka, Japan
- Occupation: Actor
- Years active: 1961–present
- Children: Ryō Hashizume

Isao Hashizume (橋爪功, Hashizume Isao; born 17 September 1941) is a Japanese actor. He also worked as a narrator for documentaries, both on television and film. He trained as an actor at Bungakuza.

== Selected filmography ==
=== Film ===
Year	Title	Role	Notes	Ref.
1962	A Wanderer's Notebook	Student		
1969	A Thousand and One Nights	Aslan (voice)		
1983	World Famous Fairy Tale Series	Various voices	Series of short films	
1983	Shōsetsu Yoshida Gakkō	Takeo Fukuda		
1985	Love Letter	Counselor		
1987	A Taxing Woman			
1990	Tales of a Golden Geisha			
1992	Future Memories: Last Christmas			
1993	Kozure Ōkami: Sono Chiisaki Te ni			
2005	Lorelei: The Witch of the Pacific Ocean			
2006	Tears for You			
2010	Railways	Kurihara		
2010	Space Battleship Yamato	Heikurō Tōdō		
2011	I Wish	Shūkichi Ōsako		
2013	The Eternal Zero	Genjirō Izaki		
2013	Tokyo Family	Shūkichi Hirayama	Lead role	
2013	The Tale of the Princess Kaguya	Prince Kuramochi (voice)		
2014	The Little House			
2015	Nagasaki: Memories of My Son	Professor Kawakami		
2016	What a Wonderful Family!	Shūzō Hirata	Lead role	
2016	After the Storm			
2017	What a Wonderful Family! 2	Shūzō Hirata	Lead role	
2017	Hamon: Yakuza Boogie	Takao Koshimizu		
2017	The Third Murder	Akihisa Shigemori		
2017	Destiny: The Tale of Kamakura			
2018	Girl's Play			
2018	What a Wonderful Family! 3	Shūzō Hirata	Lead role	
2018	Usuke Boys	Usuke Asai		
2019	The Day's Organ	Kondō		
2019	Whistleblower	Kazuhiro Miyano		
2019	The Great War of Archimedes	Shigetarō Shimada		
2019	They Say Nothing Stays the Same			
2019	Tora-san, Wish You Were Here	Kazuo Oikawa		
2021	End-of-Life Concierge	Sin'ichi Ohara		
2021	Under the Open Sky	Tsutomu Shōji		
2021	The Bonds of Clay			
2022	Dreaming of the Meridian Arc			
2023	Shylock's Children	Kōichi Ishimoto		
2023	Revolver Lily			
2023	The Silent Service	Daigo Unabara		
2024	The Ohara Family Rhapsody	Sin'ichi Ohara		
2024	Voices of Loved One			
2024	City Hunter	Akutsu		
2025	The Tales of Kurashiki			
2026	Goodbye, My Loved Ones!	Sin'ichi Ohara		

=== Television ===
Year	Title	Role	Notes	Ref.
1966	Minamoto no Yoshitsune		Taiga drama	
1972	Key Hunter			
1974–78	Taiyō ni Hoero!		5 episodes	
1976	Daitokai Tatakainohibi		Episode 20	
1979	Kusa Moeru	Itō Sukekiyo	Taiga drama	
1979	Oretachi wa Tenshi da!	Detective Hashizume	Episode 1	
1985	Kage no Gundan IV	Hyōsai		
1985	Kage no Gundan Bakumatsu Hen	Hyōsai		
1988	Takeda Shingen	Sanada Yukitaka	Taiga drama	
1994	Papa wa Newscaster Kaetekita Kagami Ryutarō	Kogure Hideo		
1995	Aishiteiru to Itte Kure	Nobuyoshi Sakaki		
2009	The Waste Land	Masaharu Tanigawa		
2013	Samurai Rebellion	Yanagase Sanzaemon	TV movie	
2014	Leaders	Matazō Ishiyama		
2014	Tokyo ni Olympic o Yonda Otoko	Kazushige Hirasawa	TV movie	
2016	Shizumanu Taiyō	Issei Ryuzaki		
2017	Leaders 2	Matazō Ishiyama		
2017	Hagoku	Nukui		
2017	Fuku Kaze wa Aki	Yahei	Lead role, TV movie	
2018	Manpuku	Ryōzō Mitamura	Asadora	
2018	Cold Case Season 2			
2020	The Return		TV movie	
2021	Bullets, Bones and Blocked Noses	Shishiba	Miniseries	
2023	Vivant	Shirō Uehara		
2024	The Silent Service	Daigo Unabara		
2025	Gannibal Season 2	Masamune Kamiyama		

== Awards and honours ==
Awards

Year	Award	Category	Result	Ref.
1990	13th Japan Academy Film Prize	Best Supporting Actor	Nominated	
1992	15th Japan Academy Film Prize	Best Supporting Actor	Nominated	
1997	20th Japan Academy Film Prize	Best Actor	Nominated	
2014	37th Japan Academy Film Prize	Best Actor	Nominated	

Honours

Year	Honour	Ref.
2021	Order of the Rising Sun, 4th Class, Gold Rays with Rosette	
