= Kenji Yanobe =

Japanese artist

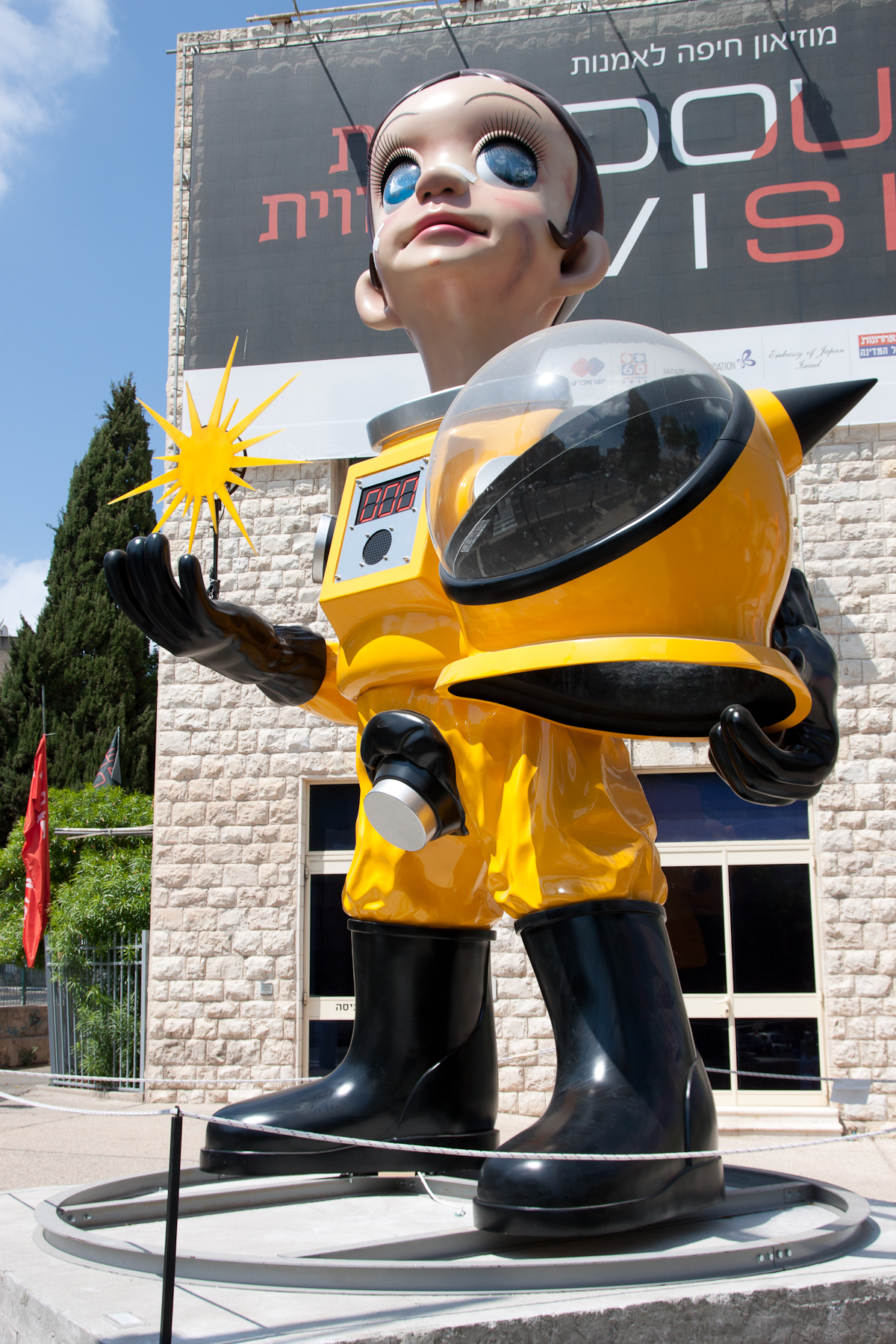
Kenji Yanobe's "Sun Child" outside the Haifa Museum of Art

Kenji Yanobe (ヤノベケンジ Yanobe Kenji) is a Japanese contemporary artist known for his upbeat yet dystopian artwork. His sculpture simulates consumer products designed for survival after a nuclear holocaust.

He is a professor at Kyoto University of Art and Design. He is also the director of Ultra Factory there.

He was born in Ibaraki City, Osaka. After graduating from high school, he studied at Kyoto City University of Arts in 1989, majoring in sculpture. After studying at the Royal College of Art in England for a short time, he completed the Graduate School of Kyoto City University of Arts in 1991.

== Artwork ==
Yanobe's sculptures closely fit a modern Japanese consumer aesthetic. His pieces, often based on robots, appear to be the products of the most modern industrial design: bright colors, polished metal, articulable joints, and shiny finish. However, they betray a fear of nuclear war. Yanobe's artwork includes brightly colored hazmat suits and tiny action figures with built-in geiger counters. They pose the question: Would life after a nuclear war be possible, and if it were, would it be worth living?

Yanobe has had art shows throughout the world, including the United States, Europe, and his native Japan. His artwork was displayed at the grounds of the 1970 World's Fair in Osaka, Japan. It was the last show there before the site was taken down in March 2004.

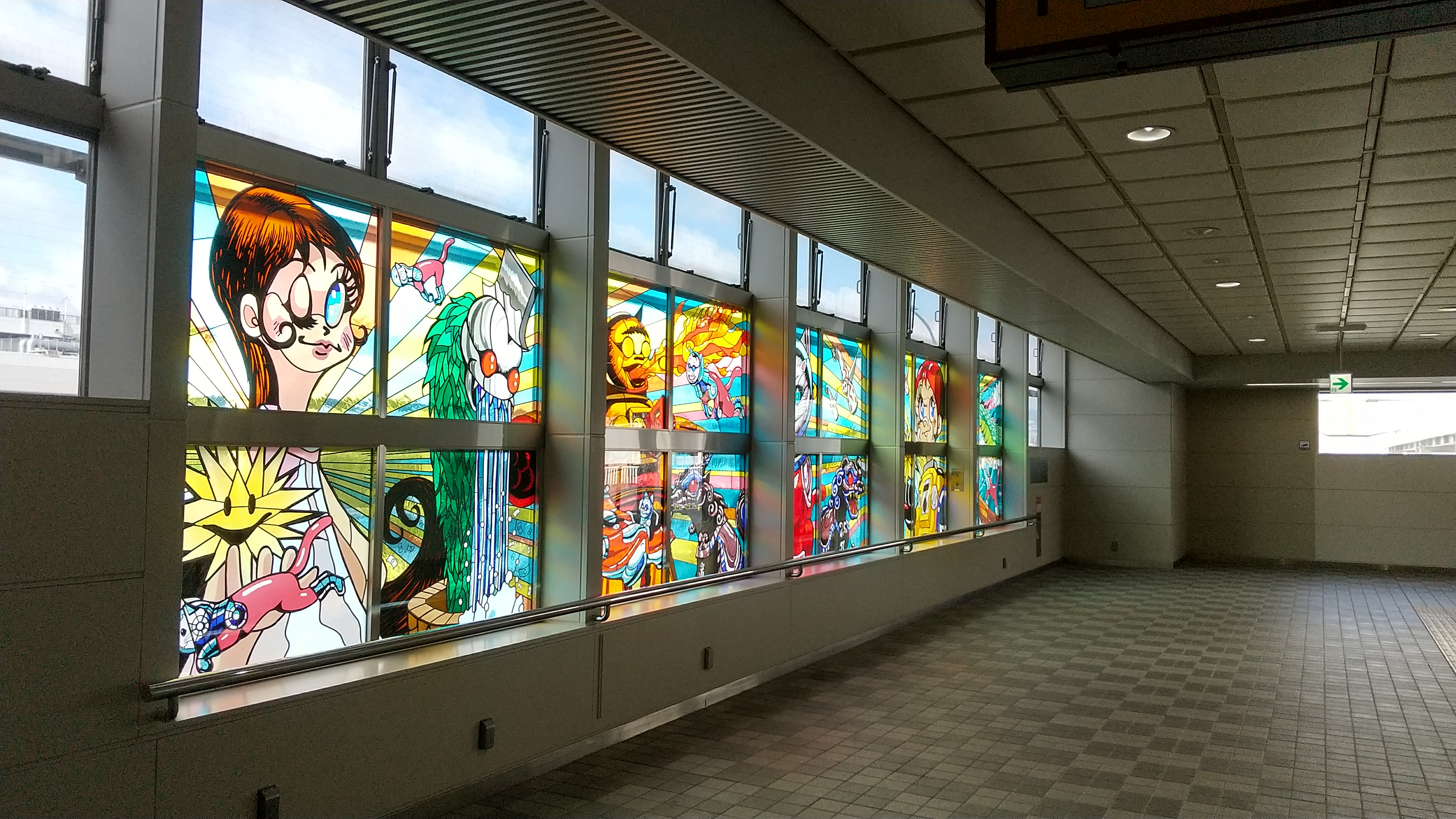
Stained-glass windows by Kenji Yanobe, Osaka International Airport.

In 2009, he won the Osaka Culture Prize.
