= Osaka Culture Prize =

- Country: Japan
- Presented by: Osaka Prefecture
- First award: 1963
- Website: https://www.osaka-bunka.jp/index.html

The Osaka Culture Prize (大阪文化賞, Osaka Bunka Shou) is an annual award presented by the Osaka prefectural government to groups or individuals who have made outstanding contributions to the arts and the improvement and promotion of Osaka's art culture.

Since 2009, it has been presented to one individual or group each year. Prior to 2008, it was divided into five arts and culture subcategories. No prize was awarded in 2008.

== Recipients ==
=== Osaka Culture Prize ===
Year	Recipient
2019	Masayuki Toyoshima
2018	Makate Asai
2017	Michiyoshi Inoue
2016	Yasumasa Morimura
2015	Yūkichi Matsumoto
2014	Marutaka Akio
2013	Kataoka Ainosuke VI
2012	Kiritake Kanjuro
2011	Hiroshi Ishiguro
2010	Yuta Iyama
2009	Kenji Yanobe
2007	Keiko Nakamura
2006	Nobuaki Kumagai

=== Osaka Arts Prize ===
Year	Recipient
2007	Nizaemon Kataoka
2006	Toshizo Namba

=== Osaka Culture Special Prize ===
Year	Recipient
2006	Katsura Bunshi VI

=== Osaka Arts Special Prize ===
Year	Recipient
2007	Machie Oguri
2006	Eiji Oue

=== Osaka Cultural Transmission Prize ===
Year	Recipient
2007	Naomi Fujiyama
2006	Sakata Tōjūrō IV
