= What a Wonderful Family! =

- Poster

Japanese name
- Kanji: 家族はつらいよ
Transcriptions
- Revised Hepburn: Kazoku wa Tsurai yo
- Directed by: Yoji Yamada
- Written by: Yoji Yamada; Emiko Hiramatsu
- Produced by: Hiroshi Fukazawa
- Starring: Isao Hashizume; Kazuko Yoshiyuki; Masahiko Nishimura; Yui Natsukawa; Tomoko Nakajima; Hayashiya Shōzō IX; Satoshi Tsumabuki; Yū Aoi
- Cinematography: Masashi Chikamori
- Edited by: Iwao Ishii
- Music by: Joe Hisaishi
- Distributed by: Shochiku
- Release dates: February 11, 2016 (Sanuki Film Festival); March 12, 2016 (Japan)
- Running time: 108 minutes
- Country: Japan
- Language: Japanese
- Box office: ¥173 million

What a Wonderful Family! (Japanese: 家族はつらいよ, Hepburn: Kazoku wa Tsurai yo) is a 2016 Japanese comedy film directed by Yoji Yamada and starring Isao Hashizume, Kazuko Yoshiyuki, Masahiko Nishimura, Yui Natsukawa, Tomoko Nakajima, Hayashiya Shōzō IX, Satoshi Tsumabuki and Yū Aoi. It was released in Japan by Shochiku on March 12, 2016. The film uses the same cast as Yamada's 2013 film Tokyo Family.

== Plot summary ==
A husband (Isao Hashizume) and wife (Kazuko Yoshiyuki) have been married for 50 years. For her birthday, the husband asks the wife what she wants for her birthday present. She replies that she wants a divorce. The wife's divorce announcement sends the entire family into chaos. Their children are thrown into a state of panic to hear this news of separation. Amid the sudden tumult of life, each member of the family begins to voice out their respective grievances.

== Cast ==
- Isao Hashizume
- Kazuko Yoshiyuki
- Masahiko Nishimura
- Yui Natsukawa
- Tomoko Nakajima
- Hayashiya Shōzō IX
- Satoshi Tsumabuki
- Yū Aoi
- Nakamura Takanosuke
- Jun Fubuki
- Shōfukutei Tsurube II
- Nenji Kobayashi

== Reception ==
On its opening weekend in Japan, the film was fourth placed, with 151,422 admissions and ¥173 million in gross.

== Sequels ==
Two sequels have been made from the film, featuring the same cast and characters: What a Wonderful Family! 2 (家族はつらいよ2, Kazoku wa Tsurai yo 2) (released 27 May 2017) and What a Wonderful Family! 3: My Wife, My Life (妻よ薔薇のように 家族はつらいよIII, Tsuma yo, Bara no yo ni: Kazoku wa Tsurai yo 3) (released 25 May 2018).

== Remake ==
In December 2016 it was confirmed that the film would be remade in China, under a co-production between Edko and Shanghai Yiyantang Entertainment. The remake was directed by Huang Lei, who co-starred alongside his wife Sun Li.
