= Tatekawa Danshi =

Japanese politician and rakugoka (1936–2011)

Danshi Tatekawa
- 立川 談志
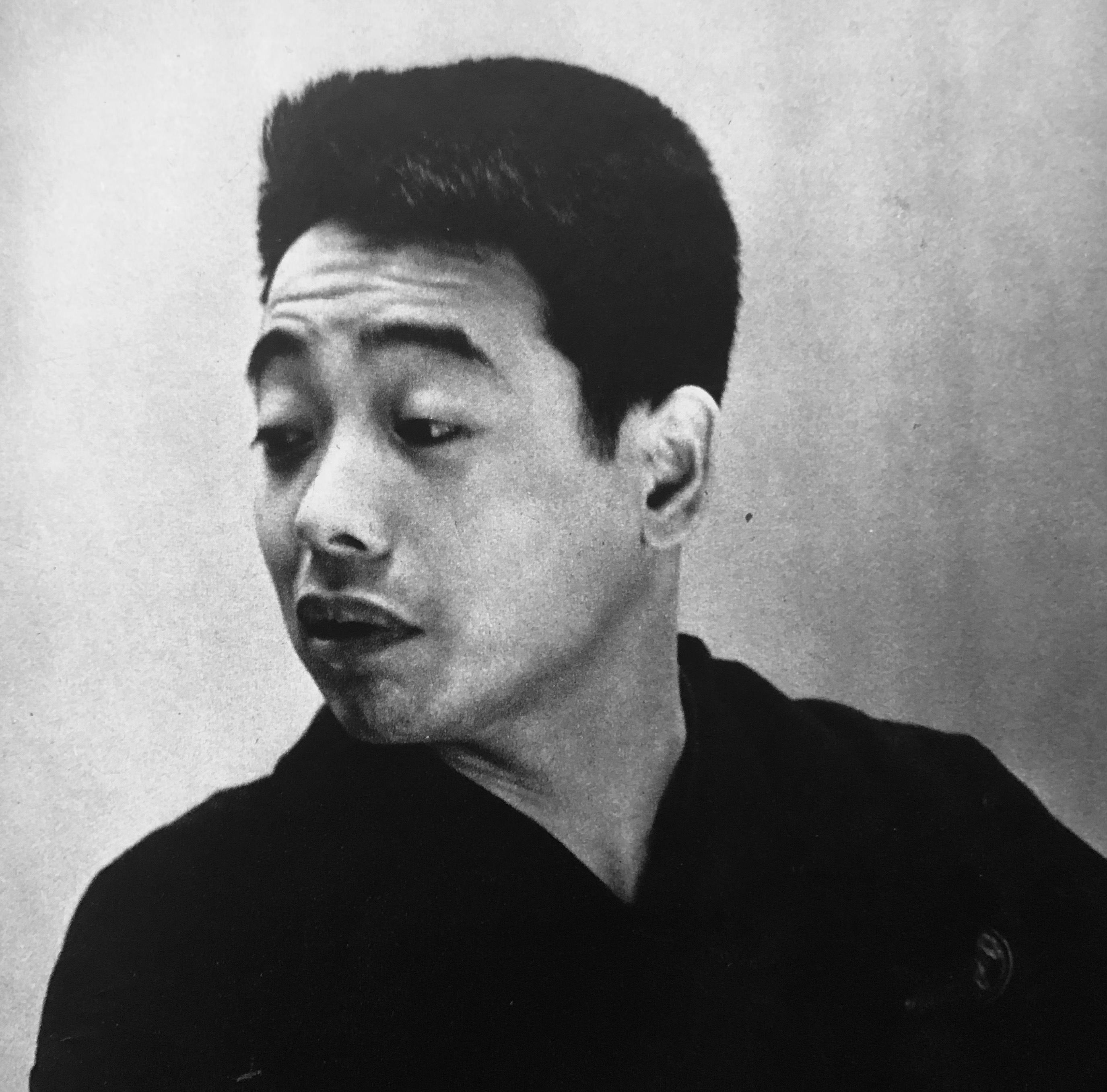
- Tatekawa in 1964

Member of the House of Councillors
- In office 4 July 1971 – 3 July 1977
- Constituency: National district

Personal details
- Born: Katsuyoshi Matsuoka (松岡 克由); 2 December 1935 Koishikawa, Tokyo, Japan
- Died: 21 November 2011 (aged 75) Bunkyō, Tokyo, Japan
- Party: Independent
- Other political affiliations: LDP (1971–1976)
- Education: Tokyo High School
- Occupation: Rakugo
- Known for: Shōten

Kamon
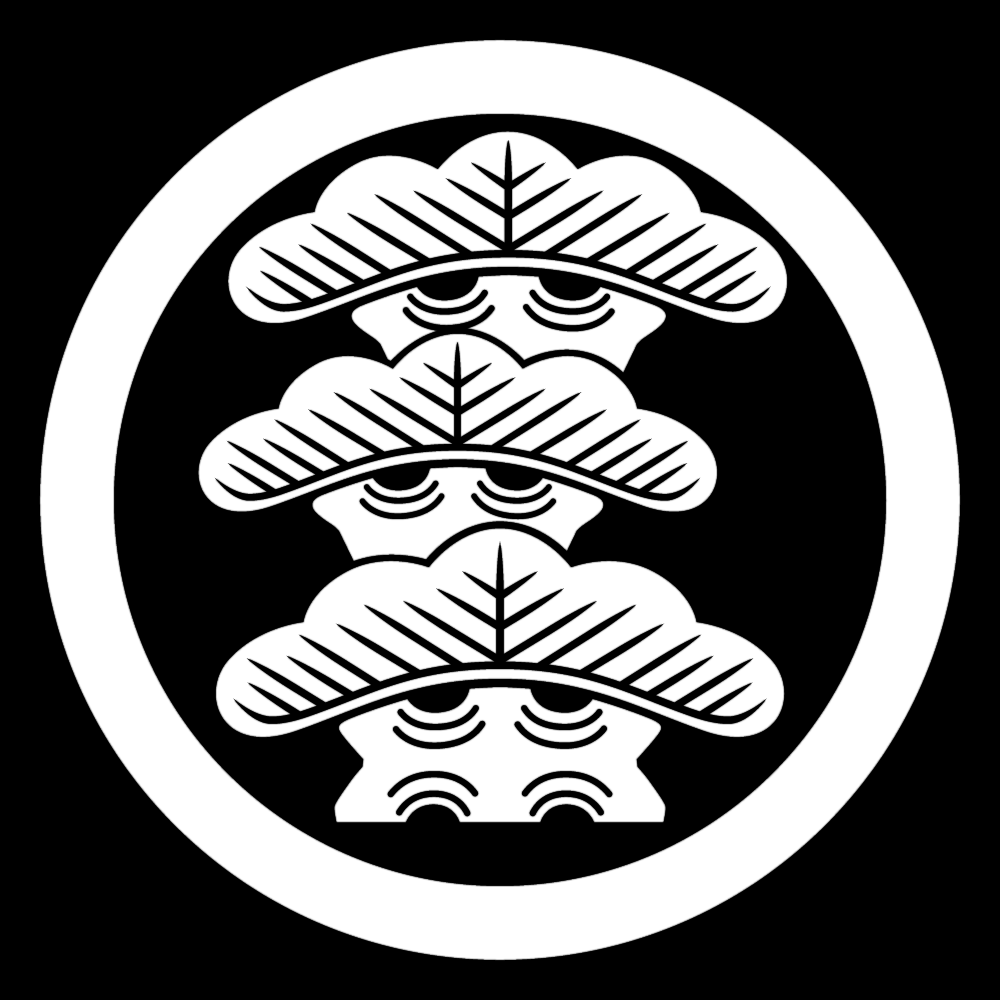

Danshi Tatekawa (立川 談志; 2 December 1935 – 21 November 2011) was a popular Japanese rakugo entertainer from Koishikawa, Tokyo.

Born Katsuyoshi Matsuoka (松岡 克由), he was a disciple of Kosan Yanagiya. Katsuyoshi would adopt the name of the famed Meiji era rakugoka Danshi Tatekawa (ja) in 1963 upon his recognition in rakugo as "shin'uchi", or a rakugo master (ja). Tatekawa was the presenter of the long running NTV variety show Shōten when it first aired in 1966, and host of the popular radio program "Danshi Tatekawa Kayo Battle" (談志・円鏡 歌謡合戦) with Tsukinoya Enkyō from 1969 through 1973. He would go on to host many other radio and television programs during his long career, and write more than a dozen books on Rakugo theory.

In 1971, Tatekawa ran for one of the 50 at-large upper house seats in the Japanese Diet, coming in at 50th place and serving for one term. In typical rakugoka fashion, his response to coming in last was "the best is always the last to go up".

Failing to win a second term, Tatekawa returned to entertainment, withdrawing from his mentor Yanagiya's Rakugo Kyokai association and establishing his own school, the Tatekawa-Ryū, mentoring a number of successful rakugo, including Tatekawa Shinosuke.

A fan of Osamu Tezuka, Tatekawa developed a friendship with the prolific animator and had guest star roles in A Thousand and One Nights and Jungle Emperor Leo, and wrote an introduction to Black Jack.

Tatekawa would die at 75 of laryngeal cancer at his home in Tokyo on 21 November 2011.

According to Gendai Business columnist Kenichiro Horii, the character Issho Arakawa in the 2022 rakugo manga series Akane-banashi is modeled after Tatekawa Danshi.

== Kōzamei ==
- Yanagiya Koyoshi (柳家小よし; 1952-1954)
- Yanagiya Koen (柳家小ゑん; 1954-1963)
- Tatekawa Danshi (立川 談志; 1963-2011)
