= San'yūtei Enraku VI =

Japanese rakugo comedian (1950–2022)

- 6代目 三遊亭 円楽
- Born: Yasumichi Ai; February 8, 1950; Sumida, Tokyo, Japan
- Died: September 30, 2022 (aged 72)
- Education: Aoyama Gakuin University
- Notable work: Shōten

Comedy career
- Genre: Rakugo
- Website: Official website

6th Sanyutei Enraku (6代目 三遊亭 円楽, Rokudaime San'yūtei Enraku; February 8, 1950 – September 30, 2022) was a Japanese rakugo comedian known for performing on the Shōten comedy show on Nippon TV.

Born Yasumichi Ai (會 泰通, Ai Yasumichi), he used Enraku as his stage name. He was known as a master of the Japanese comic art of rakugo, in which a single performer or storyteller appears on stage and tells comedic stories to the audience.

While a student at Aoyama Gakuin University, he began studying rakugo under San'yūtei Enraku V. His first stage name was San'yūtei Rakutarō (三遊亭 楽太郎, San'yūtei Rakutarō), until he inherited his teacher's name in March 2010.

Enraku was a producer of the Hakata Tenjin Rakugo Matsuri, a rakugo festival held in Fukuoka city from 2007.

On January 25, 2022, Enraku's agency announced that he suffered from a cerebral infarction, further complicated by his ongoing treatment for lung cancer. After his hospitalization, rakugo artists who had a close relationship with Enraku served as guests on Shōten. He died on September 30, 2022, at the age of 72.
