= Fly-Day Chinatown =

1981 song by Yasuha

- 1981 single cover

Single by Yasuha

from the album Transit
- Language: Japanese
- B-side: "Morning Date"
- Released: 21 September 1981
- Genre: City pop
- Label: Polydor Records
- Composer: Yasuha (as Yasuha Ebina)
- Lyricist: Toyohisa Araki
- Producers: Norio Misawa; Hideaki Uehiro

Yasuha singles chronology
"Fly-Day Chinatown" (1981)	""Blue Night Blue"" (1982)

"Fly-Day Chinatown" (フライディ・チャイナタウン, Furaidi Chainataun) is the 1981 debut song of Japanese singer Yasuha, released as part of her debut album Transit. As part of the 2020s city pop wave, it returned to popularity after Night Tempo's video of his own remix of the song became viral. It was subsequently re-issued on vinyl and digital platforms.

== Production and composition ==
"Fly-Day Chinatown" was the debut single of Yasuha. Toyohisa Araki was lyricist, Yasuha was composer (credited under her full name Yasuha Ebina) and Akira Inoue was arranger.

Music release collector Chappy Kato said of the song's composition: "playing the keyboard and singing powerfully about a night in Yokohama, where foreigners hang out, Yasuha was a city pop diva." Aki Ito of Real Sound called the song's groove "a good match for today's dance floor music", noting that it "allows [Yasuha's] voice to take center stage without being lost in the groovy music" and uses transposition (between notes and lyrics) and vibrato. Nikkan Cyzo said that "Fly-Day Chinatown" has "a slightly funny little song aspect". Hitoshi Kurimoto cited Billy Joel and yacht rock as an influence on the song.

Singer and comedian Tablet Jun remarked that the titular Chinatown in the song may be Yokohama Chinatown and that Fly-Day refers to how "the mysterious neon lights of Chinatown are brilliant, exuding an aphrodisiac-like quality just from the fleeting encounter between a man and a woman". Kotetsu Shoichiro said that the Anglosphere has an interest in the division of the word "Fly" into three kana syllables.

== Original release ==
"Fly-Day Chinatown" was released by Polydor Records on 21 September 1981. Its B-side was "Morning Date", which had the same lyricist, composer, and arranger as the A-side. Both songs were also part of Yasuha's debut album Transit. The single peaked at #69 on the Oricon Singles Chart. She was once invited to perform the song at the FIS Nordic World Ski Championships 1982.

"Fly-Day Chinatown" appeared on the 2004 compilation album Yokohama Fantasy. It was reportedly heard on variety shows when they reported on Yasuha's 2007 divorce press conference. On 18 September 2017, she performed the song on Nicoradi, attracting widespread praise on social media. A titular mini-album with the song was to be released two days later by Crown Tokuma, but was cancelled.

In June 2020, singer Ms.Ooja released her cover of "Fly-Day Chinatown" as a single. Other artists who have covered the song include Sora Amamiya, Beni, Atsuko Enomoto, Yuji Kurokawa of Yourness with Koujun, Re:inc, Re:Re:Re:Tune, and Taningoto (ft. Harusaruhi). In 2026, a video of several cast members from The Specials dancing to "Fly-Day Chinatown", which is one of the film's insert songs, was released.

== 2020s revitalization ==
In November 2021, Night Tempo posted a video of himself spinning his remix of "Fly-Day Chinatown" at the Los Angeles nightclub The Novo; it went viral on Twitter amidst a 2020s wave of overseas city pop popularity. It also became popular on TikTok, though covers and remixes were used on videos there since the original had no digital release at the time. It also spawned a TikTok meme where the song would be lower-pitched to sound like the Hunter × Hunter character Killua Zoldyck. In May 2023, Night Tempo released a vinyl release of his remix of "Fly-Day Chinatown" as part of his Showa Groove series, also featuring a new remix of "Bluenight Blue" (another Yasuha song). Other remixers of the song include Aests and Evade from Uchuu.

Takanori Chujyo called "Fly-Day Chinatown" an example of the overseas rise of city pop, and Kotetsu compared its newfound popularity to "Plastic Love" and "Mayonaka no Door". Kurimoto called it "the song that has generated the most buzz" in 2022. Tablet Jun said of the song's 2020s rediscovery that "the melody that Yasuha herself spun is imbued with the soaring wings of a phoenix". The song also became so popular it could be heard among teenage bicycle riders.

On 25 May 2022, "Fly-Day Chinatown" received its first digital music release. In June 2022, it charted at second place on Spotify's Daily Viral Songs (Japan). On 29 June 2022, Universal Music Japan re-issued the song's 7-inch vinyl release alongside the first release of the City Pop Selections series. A lyric video depicting illustrations by Bob a.k.a. Enchan was also released, achieving 780,000 views by July 2022.

== Track listing ==
Cited from the single's liner notes.

Side one
No.	Title	Lyrics	Music	Arrangement	Length
1.	"Fly-Day Chinatown" (フライディ・チャイナタウン)	Toyohisa Araki	Yasuha Ebina	Akira Inoue
2.	"Morning Date" (モーニング・デート)	Araki	Ebina	Inoue

== Credits and personnel ==
- Katsuyuki Handa – mixer
- Norio Misawa – producer
- Tadashi Mutō – photographer
- Ryō Shinohara – director
- Hideaki Uehiro – producer
- Mitsuru Yamada – designer
