= Tokyo High School =

- 東京高等学校

- The High School in 2005

Location
- 2-39-1 Unoki; Ōta, Tokyo, 146-0091; Japan; 35.5740°N 139.6763°E

Information
- Type: High school
- Established: 1872; 154 years ago
- Enrollment: co-educational in 1971
- Affiliation: independent
- Website: http://www.tokyo-hs.ac.jp/

Tokyo High School (東京高等学校 Tōkyō Kōtōgakkō) is an independent high school in Ōta, Tokyo, Japan. It was founded in 1872 in what is now Ueno district of Taitō under the name Ueno-juku. It moved to its present location in Ōmori, Ōta in 1934, and assumed its present name in 1954 (a former "Tokyo High School" having become part of Tokyo University). It became co-educational in 1971.

== Notable alumni ==
=== Writers ===
- You Sano, mystery novelist
- Yūzō Yamamoto, playwright

=== Entertainers ===
- Hiroya Ishimaru, voice actor
- Makidai, dancer
- Shinji Maki, ukulele player
- Yuka Nomura, actress
- Tatekawa Danshi, Rakugoka

=== Athletes ===
- Taku Bamba, race car driver
- Asuka Cambridge, sprinter
- Kyosuke Horie, rugby player
- Yuya Iwadate, footballer
- Chinatsu Mori, shot putter
- Yuya Saito, rugby player
- Tomokazu Soma, rugby player

=== Others ===
- Shigetarō Shimada, Imperial Japanese Navy admiral and war criminal

== See also ==
- List of high schools in Tokyo
