= Hayashiya Shōzō IX =

Japanese rakugoka, tarento and voice actor

- 林屋正造 9代目
- Born: Yasutaka Ebina; December 1, 1962 (age 63); Negishi, Taito, Tokyo, Japan
- Occupation: Associate professor of humanities at Josai International University
- Known for: Rakugoka Tarento Voice acting
- Notable work: Tokyo Family
- Father: Hayashiya Sanpei I
- Relatives: Hayashiya Shōzō VII (grandfather); Hayashiya Sanpei I (father); Hayashiya Sanpei II (younger brother); Yasuha (sister); Hayashiya Ponpei (Son); Azuki Ebina (daughter); Hayashiya Tamahei (Son)

Hayashiya Shōzō IX (九代目 林家 正蔵, Kudaime Hayashiya Shōzō; born Yasutaka Ebina (海老名 泰孝, Ebina Yasutaka), December 1, 1962 in Negishi, Taito, Tokyo, Japan), formerly known as Hayashiya Kobuhei (林家 こぶ平, Hayashiya Kobuhei), is a Japanese rakugoka, tarento and voice actor. He is an associate professor of humanities at Josai International University. He is the son of Hayashiya Sanpei I.

== Filmography ==
=== Films ===
- Tokyo Family (2013)
- What a Wonderful Family! (2016)
- What a Wonderful Family! 2 (2017)
- What a Wonderful Family! 3: My Wife, My Life (2018)
- The Day's Organ (2019)
- The Lone Ume Tree (2021)
- The Tales of Kurashiki (2025)

=== TV dramas ===
- Sasurai Keiji Ryojōhen (xxxx)
- Seibu Keisatsu (xxxx)
- Ishikawa Goemon (2016), Tokugawa Ieyasu
- Segodon (2018), Ōmura Masujirō
- Unbound (2025), Matsudaira Nobuyoshi

=== Anime ===
- Anpanman (xxxx) (Hayashi Riceman)
- Hiatari Ryōkō! (xxxx) (Takashi Ariyama)
- KochiKame: Tokyo Beat Cops (xxxx) (Yōichi Terai)
- Oishinbo (xxxx) (Kichijō Kairakutei)
- Sekai Dōbutsubanashi Tao Tao Ehonkan (xxxx)
- Super Doll Licca-chan (1998) (Wire)
- Ton Ton Atta to: Niigata no Mukashibanashi (xxxx) (narrator, all male characters)
- Touch (xxxx) (Kōtarō Matsudaira)
- Pom Poko (xxxx) (Ponkichi)

== Commercials ==
- Niki Golf
- U-Can (narrator)
- Ishinoya, Inc.

== Variety shows ==
- Anzen Patrol
- Hayashiya Shōzō no Tokyo Michi Tankentai
- Hotchpotch Station
- Kiseki no Tobira: TV no Chikara
- Mogu Mogu GOMBO
- Morita Kazuyoshi Hour Waratte Ii tomo!
- Tensai Quiz
- TV Tanteidan

== Radio ==
- Hayashiya Shōzō no Sengaku Banrai
- Hayashiya Shōzō no Sunday University
- Kuru Kuru Dial the Gorilla
- Teyandi! Kobu JA de Dōdi
