= Shijaku Katsura II =

Japanese comedian (1939–1999)

Crest of the Katsura school of rakugo

Katsura Shijaku II (2代目 桂 枝雀, Nidaime Katsura Shijaku; August 13, 1939 – April 19, 1999) was a Japanese rakugo performer of the late 20th century, who often performed in English. He was born Tōru Maeda (前田 達, Maeda Tōru) in Kobe, the son of a brick-maker. In 1960, he entered the tutelage of the rakugo performer Katsura Beichō III (桂米朝), and upon completion of his study, was given the stage name Katsura Koyone X (桂小米). He changed his stage name to Shijaku Katsura (Shijaku Katsura II) in 1974.

Katsura studied English in the early 1980s, and gave his first English-language rakugo performance in 1983. For the rest of his career, he often performed rakugo in the United States, Canada, and elsewhere, making an otherwise inaccessible form of comedy accessible for non-Japanese speakers.

He also assisted in launching the career of Bill Crowley, the non-Japanese professional rakugo performer.

Katsura died of heart failure on April 19, 1999, after a suicide attempt at his home in Suita, Osaka. He was discovered by his wife Eyo and his brother, the magician Takeshi Maeda.
