= Tachibanaya Takezō II =

Japanese comedian (born 1947)

Tachibanaya Takezō II (2代目 橘家 竹蔵, Nidaime Tachibanaya Takezō; born Tokio Kōketsu (纐纈 勅男, Kōketsu Tokio), born October 22, 1947, in Iida, Nagano, Japan) is a rakugo artist. He currently resides in Tokyo.

== Rakugo career ==
Tachibanaya first performed in September, 1965 at Shinjuku Suehirotei, with a story called Karanuke. He regular performs in Shinjuku, Asakusa, Ueno and Ikebukuro. In 2005, he released a DVD from Avex titled Tachibanaya Takezou.
