= Hayashiya Sanpei I =

Japanese comedian

- 初代 林家 三平
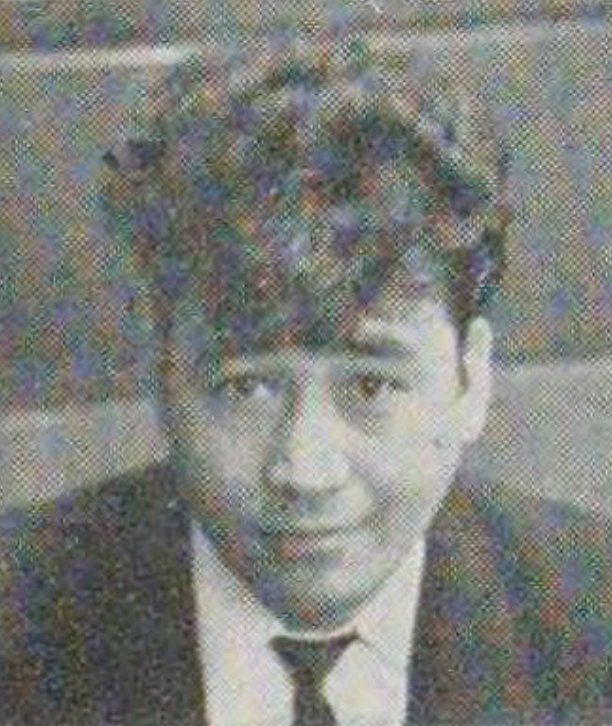
- Hayashiya in 1962
- Born: Eizaburō Ebina; 30 November 1925; Taitō, Tokyo
- Died: 20 September 1980 (aged 54)
- Other name: Yasuichirō Ebina
- Children: Hayashiya Shōzō IX; Hayashiya Sanpei II; Yasuha

Comedy career
- Genre: Rakugo

Hayashiya Sanpei I (初代 林家 三平, Shodai Hayashiya Sanpei; born Eizaburō Ebina (海老名 栄三郎, Ebina Eizaburō), later Yasuichirō Ebina (海老名 泰一郎, Ebina Yasuichirō), 30 November 1925 - 20 September 1980) was a Japanese rakugoka and comedian. His trademark line was "Sō nansu, okusan!" (That's the way it is, madam!). Rakugoka Hayashiya Shōzō IX and Hayashiya Sanpei II are his sons and singer Yasuha is his daughter.

== Life ==
Hayashiya was born in Taitō, Tokyo on 30 November 1925. He died on 20 September 1980, aged 54.

== Legacy ==
The Pokémon species Wobbuffet is a homage to Hayashiya.
