= Katsura Utamaru =

- 桂歌丸
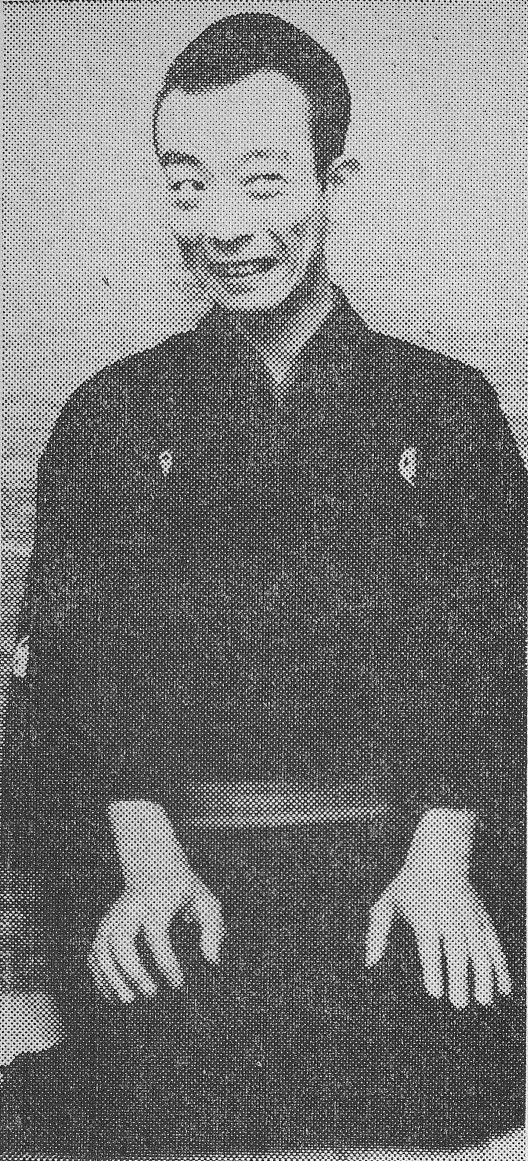
- Utamaru in 1966.
- Born: Iwao Shiina; 14 August 1936; Yokohama
- Died: 2 July 2018 (aged 81)
- Awards: Order of the Rising Sun (2007)
- Comedy career
- Genres: Rakugo

Katsura Utamaru (桂 歌丸; 14 August 1936 – 2 July 2018) was a Japanese rakugo comedian best known for hosting the Shōten comedy show on Nippon TV. He is known as a master of the Japanese comic art of rakugo, in which a single performer or storyteller appears on stage and tells comedic stories to the audience.

== Career ==
Born in Yokohama, Utamaru's real name was Iwao Shiina. He became an apprentice of the rakugoka Kokontei Imasuke V in 1951 at the age of 15, assuming the name Kokontei Imaji. He left rakugo for a while, then became the apprentice of Katsura Yonemaru, assuming the new name Katsura Yonebo. He changed his name to Katsura Utamaru in 1964 and rose to the shin'uchi rank in 1968.

He was one of the first members of Shōten when it started in 1966. He became its host in 2006, but retired in 2016 for health reasons. He became the head of the Rakugo Geijutsu Kyokai in 2004, and received many honors, including the Order of the Rising Sun in 2007. He died of chronic obstructive pulmonary disease on 2 July 2018 at a hospital in Yokohama.

== Kōzamei ==
- Kokontei Imaji (古今亭 今児; 1951-1961)
- Katsura Yonebo (桂 米坊; 1961-1964)
- Katsura Utamaru (桂 歌丸; 1964-2018)
