= Japanese destroyer Katsura =

Two warships of Japan have borne the name Katsura (桂, "Cercidiphyllum japonicum") :

- Japanese destroyer Katsura (1915), a Kaba-class destroyer launched in 1915 and struck in 1932
- Japanese destroyer Katsura (1945), a Tachibana-class destroyer launched in 1945 but never completed
