= Kikuō Hayashiya =

Japanese rakugo performer

- 林家 木久扇
- Born: Hiroshi Toyota; 19 October 1937 (age 87); Nihonbashi, Japan
- Occupations: Rakugoka; singer

YouTube information
- Channel: KIKUKIN TV
- Years active: 2019 -
- Genre: Vlog
- Subscribers: 48.8 thousand
- Views: 2.52 million
- Last updated: 4 September 2024

Kikuō Hayashiya (Japanese: 林家 木久扇, Hepburn: Hayashiya Kikuō; born October 19, 1937) is a Japanese rakugo performer and a featured member of the long-running television comedy show Shōten. His real name is Hiroshi Toyota (豊田 洋, Toyota Hiroshi), although he is most widely known by his previous comedian name Kikuzō Hayashiya (林家 木久蔵), a name he was the first to assume. The new Kikuzō Hayashiya is his son, the former Kikuo Hayashiya (林家 きくお, Hayashiya Kikuo). On Shōten he always wears a yellow kimono. He is known for making commonplace jokes and usually "plays the fool".

== Discography ==
=== Singles ===
List of singles, with selected chart positions
Release date	Title	Notes
December,1975	"Yoihime Elegy" (酔姫エレジー)	
April,1978	"Iya'n baka'n" (いやんばか〜ん)	
April,1978	"Kikuzō no na'nt'yate kazoeuta" (木久蔵のナンチャッテ数え唄)	

== Kikuzō Ramen ==
Kikuō has a chain of noodle shops named after him called "Kikuzō Ramen." On Shōten, he often advertises Kikuzō Ramen, but other members joke about it being very flavorless.

== Other Websites ==
- Kikuō's HP
- Kikuō Hayashiya at IMDb
