= Hayashiya Sanpei II =

Japanese rakugo comedian and tarento (born 1970)

- 2代目 林家 三平
- Born: Taisuke Ebina; December 11, 1970 (age 55); Negishi, Taitō, Tokyo, Japan
- Other names: Hayashiya Ippei
- Education: Tokyo Metropolitan Takenodai High School; Chuo University Faculty of Economics
- Occupations: Rakugo comedian, tarento
- Years active: 1989–present
- Agents: Horipro; Rakugo Kyokai; Negishi Sanpeido
- Spouse: Sachiko Kokubu (m. 2011)
- Relatives: Hayashiya Shōzō VII (grandfather); Hayashiya Sanpei I (father); Kayoko Ebina (mother); Midori Ebina (sister); Yasuha (sister); Hayashiya Shōzō IX (brother)

Hayashiya Sanpei II (2代目 林家 三平, Nidaime Hayashiya Sanpei; real name Taisuke Ebina (海老名 泰助, Ebina Taisuke), born 11 December 1970, in Negishi, Taitō, Tokyo, Japan) is a Japanese rakugo comedian and tarento. His debayashi is "Matsuri-bayashi". He is sometimes called Nidai Hayashiya Sanpei (二代 林家 三平). He was known as Hayashiya Ippei (林家 いっ平).

Hayashiya was the star performer of Rakugo Kyodai. He was once represented with Horipro. Hayashiya is now represented with Negishi Sanpeido. He is not only good in English, he can also speak Chinese.

From May 2016 Hayashiya became a member of "Ōgiri" of Shōten. He is left-handed.

== Filmography ==
=== TV series ===
Year	Title	Network	Notes
1984	Alfee no Aru Nitsui Totsuzen!	TBS	
1999	Shizen to Asobo	NHK E TV	Narration
2006	Mezamashi TV	Fuji TV	
2008	NHK Archives	NHK	
2008	Kachō Kōsaku Shima	NTV	
2009	Mito Kōmon	TBS	Parts 40 to 43
2010	Pittanko Kankan	TBS	
2011	Onihei Gaiden: Yousagi no Sumi Uemon	Sky PerfecTV!, Jidaigeki Senmon Channel	
2011	Ebina-san-ka no Cha Bu-dai	TBS	
2012	run for money: Tōsō-chū	Fuji TV	
2014	Tokumei Tantei	TV Asahi	Final episode
2015	Ōedo Sōsamō	TV Tokyo	
2016	Shōten	NTV	

=== Advertisements ===
Title
Niki Co
Tsūshin Hanbai CM Seigyoku "Chlorella Supply"
Tsuchikura
NTT-BJ

=== Radio series ===
Year	Title	Network
2010	Listen Soul!	TBS Radio
2015	Sanpei desu. Irasshai!	

=== Radio drama ===
Year	Title	Role
1999	Shaberedomo Shaberedomo	Kosekitei Mitsuba

=== Films ===
Year	Title	Role
2005	Ashita Genki Ninare	Tadayoshi (voice)
