= Konan Women's University =

Private women's college in Higashinada-ku, Kobe, Hyōgo, Japan

Coordinates: 34°44′4.35″N 135°17′15.29″E

- 甲南女子大学
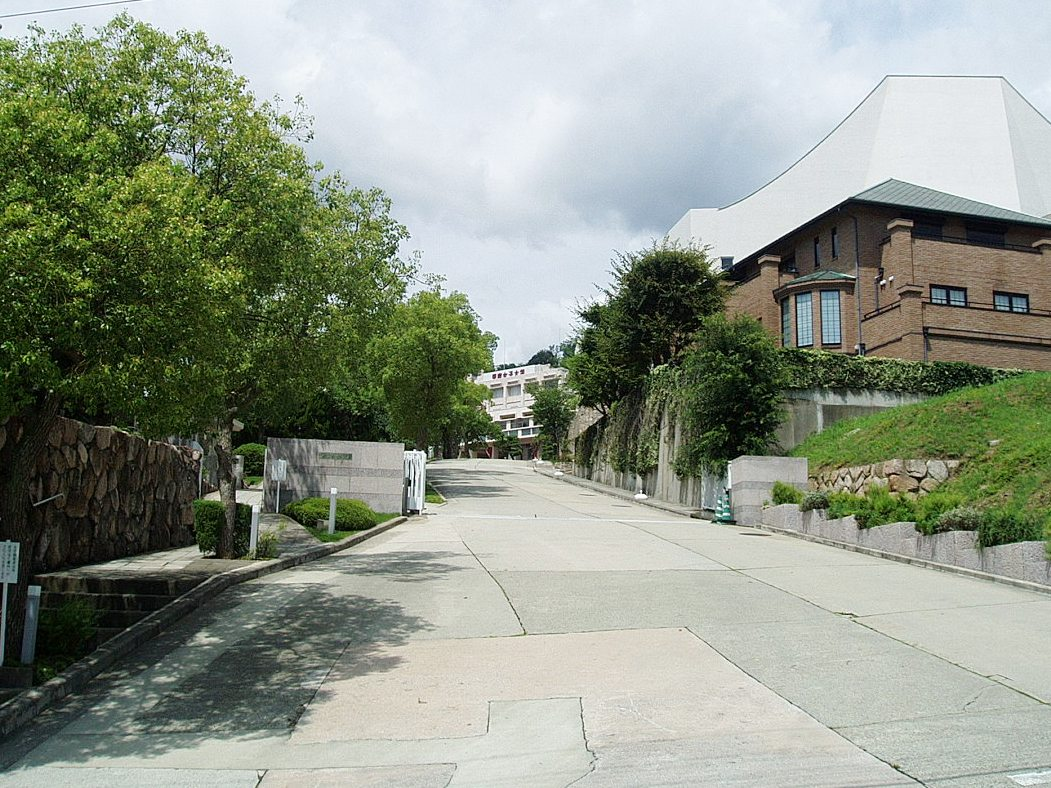
- Main entrance
- Type: Private
- Established: Founded 1920; Chartered 1955
- Academic staff: 161 full-time
- Students: 1618
- Location: Kobe, Hyogo, Japan
- Campus: Suburb
- Website: www.konan-wu.ac.jp/en

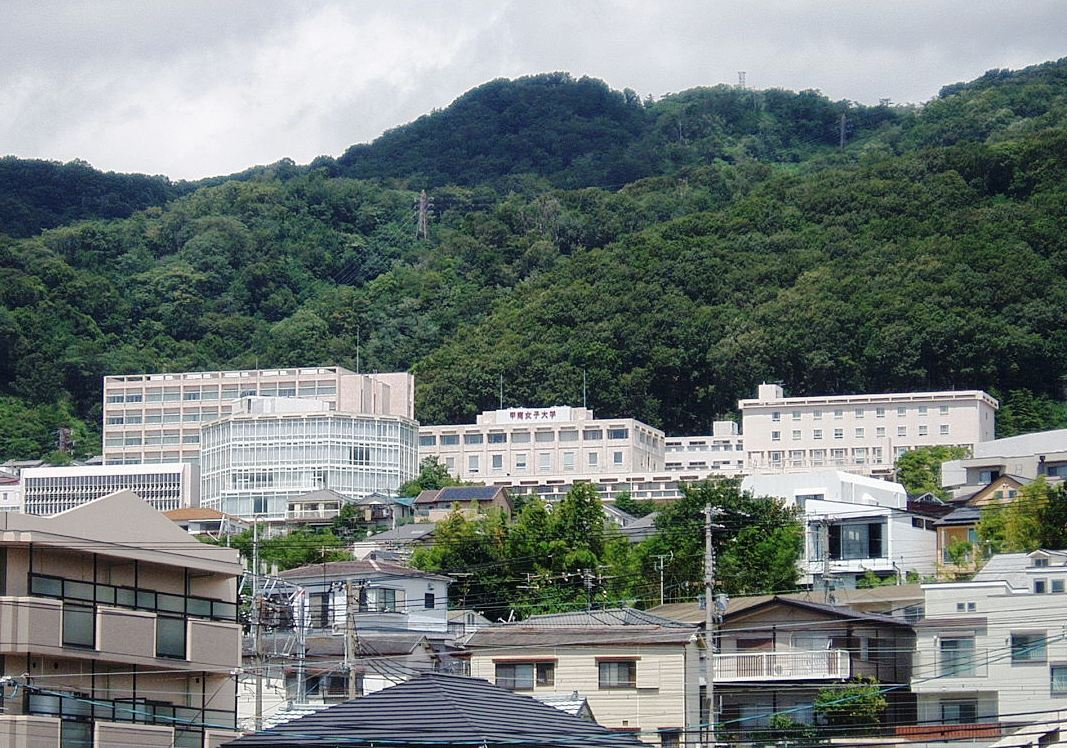
A far view from Kōnan-Yamate Station

Konan Women's University (甲南女子大学, Kōnan joshi daigaku) is a private women's college in Higashinada-ku, Kobe, Hyōgo, Japan. The predecessor of the school was founded in 1920, and it was chartered as a junior college in 1955. In 1964 it became a four-year college.

== Faculties ==
- Faculty of Letters
  - Department of Japanese Language and Culture
  - Department of English Language and Culture
  - Department of Multicultural Communication
  - Department of Creative Media Studies
- Faculty of Human Sciences
  - Department of Psychology
  - Department of Childhood Development and Education
  - Department of Cultural Sociology
  - Department of Human Life Environments
- Faculty of Nursing and Rehabilitation
  - Department of Physical Therapy

== Graduate Schools ==
- Graduate School of Humanities and Human Sciences
  - Master's Program in Psychology and Education
  - Master's Program in Sociology, Anthropology and Environmental Studies
- Graduate School of Nursing
  - Master's Program in Nursing
