= Gishū Nakayama =

Japanese writer

- 中山 義秀
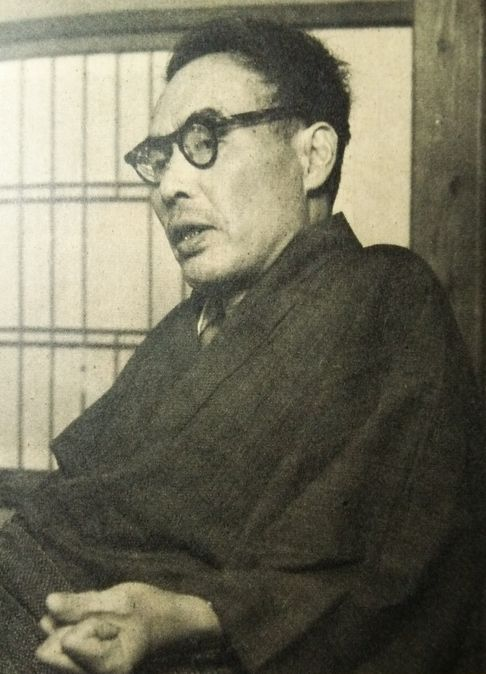
- Nakayama in 1955
- Born: 5 October 1900; Shirakawa, Fukushima Prefecture, Japan
- Died: 19 August 1969 (aged 68); Kamakura, Kanagawa prefecture, Japan
- Resting place: Engaku-ji, Kamakura, Japan
- Education: Waseda University
- Occupation: Writer
- Writing career
- Genres: historical novels, short stories
- Notable awards: Akutagawa Prize (1938); Noma Literary Prize (1964); Japan Art Academy Prize (1966)

Gishū Nakayama (中山 義秀, Nakayama Gishū; 5 October 1900 – 19 August 1969) was the pen-name of a Japanese writer active in Shōwa period Japan. His real name was Yoshihide Takama.

== Early life ==
Gishū was born in rural Nishishirakawa District, Fukushima, in what is now part of the city of Shirakawa. He was a graduate of Waseda University. While at Waseda, he befriended Yokomitsu Riichi, whose poetry he would later compare to the haiku of Matsui Basho. After his time in the university, he taught English at a middle school in Mie Prefecture with his new wife, but returned to the Tokyo area two years later to accept a post as an English teacher at a middle school in Narita, Chiba.

== Literary career ==
While a student at Waseda, Gishū founded a literary magazine, To (“Tower”) together with Yokomitsu Riichi and others, to which he contributed his first story, Ana (“The Hole”).

In 1935, despondent at the death of his wife, he drifted around Japan and drank heavily, but in 1938, he published his first short story collection, Denko (“Electric Light”), and two years later, won the 7th Akutagawa Prize for his novelette Atsumonozaki (厚物咲). These works were followed by the short stories, Ishibumi (“Monument”), Seifu Sassa (“Swift Breeze”) and Fuso (“Wind and Frost”), which secured his reputation in the literary world.

Gishū moved to Kamakura, Kanagawa prefecture, from 1943 to the end of his life and took an active interest in the lending library, Kamakura Bunkō, and the publishing house of the same name.

His experiences as a war correspondent in World War II led to the short story Teniyan no matsujitsu in 1948, about two young intellectuals who died on Tinian in the Mariana Islands towards the end of the war. This marked a new start for Gishū, who later concentrated on historical novels, with the main subject being historical figures fighting for lost causes. These works include Shōan, about the 16th century warrior Akechi Mitsuhide, which won the Noma Prize in 1964, and the Japan Art Academy Prize in 1967.

Gishū died of acute anemia in 1969. Shortly before his death, he converted to Christianity; however, his grave is at Shōrei-in sub-temple of the Zen-sect temple of Engaku-ji in Kamakura. A memorial museum was opened in his home town of Shirakawa in 1993.

== Awards ==
- 1938 Akutagawa Prize---Atsumonozaki,『厚物咲』
- 1964 Noma Literary Award---Sakuan,『咲庵』
- 1966 Award of the Japan Art Academy---Sakuan,『咲庵』

== See also ==
- Japanese literature
- List of Japanese authors
