= Katsura Sunshine =

Canadian rakugo comic storyteller and television personality,

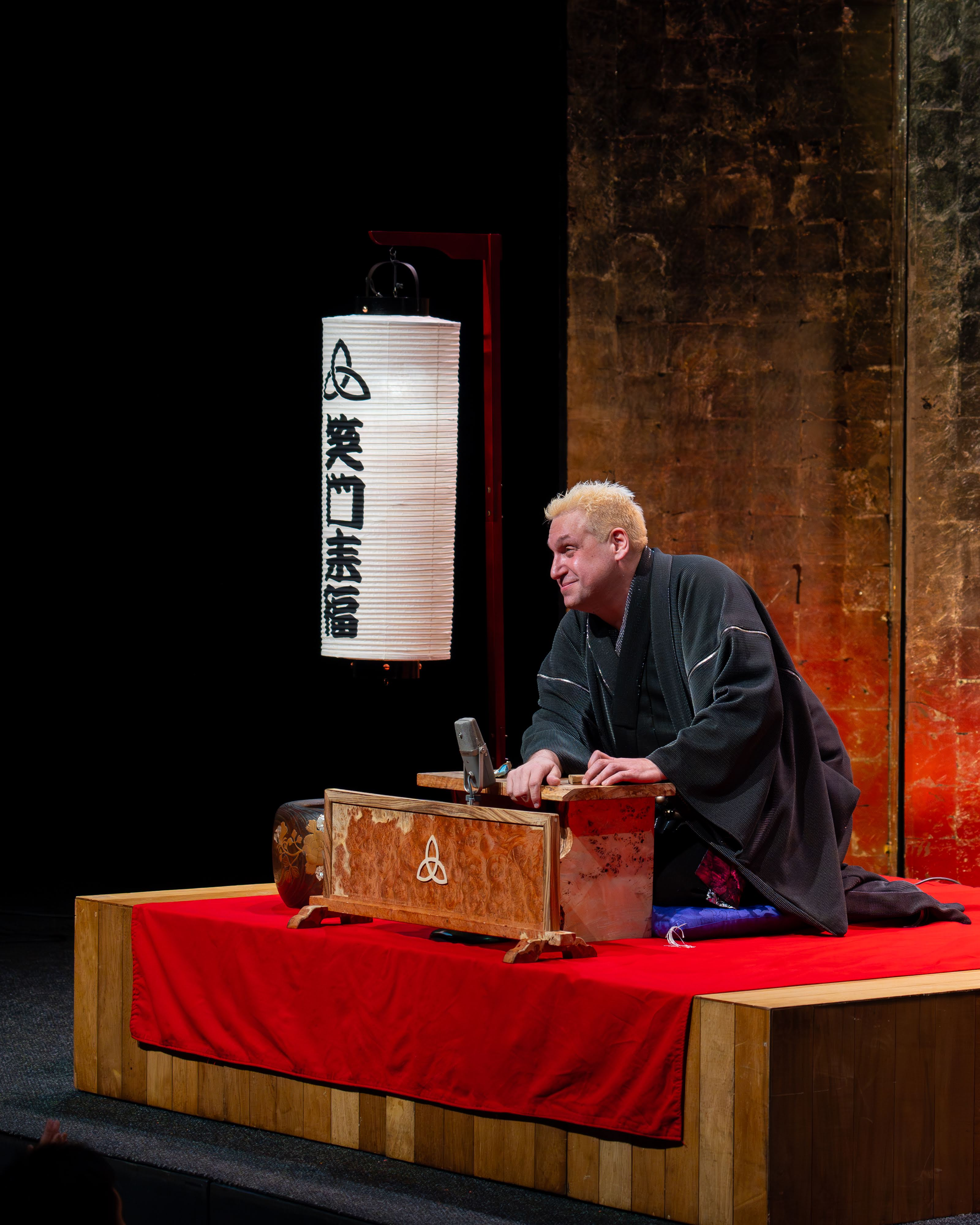
- Katsura Sunshine
- Born: Gregory Robic; Toronto, Ontario, Canada
- Occupations: Traditional Japanese "Rakugo" comic storyteller, television personality, playwright, composer
- Website: rakugo.lol

Katsura Sunshine (桂 三輝, Katsura Sanshain; born Gregory Robic, 6 April 1970) is a Canadian rakugo comic storyteller, theatre producer, and playwright.

Katsura Sunshine received his professional debut in Singapore on April 26, 2009, and completed his three-year rakugo apprenticeship in November 2011. Sunshine has also performed in the United States, Canada, the United Kingdom, France, Slovenia, Ghana, Senegal, South Africa, Gabon, Nepal, Sri Lanka, Hong Kong, Thailand, and Australia, as well as throughout Japan. He currently resides in New York City. In July 2012, he opened his own rakugo theatre in his home in Ise, called the Ise Kawasaki Kikitei, where for two years he regularly performed rakugo stories.
