= Katsura Bunshi VI =

Japanese comedian

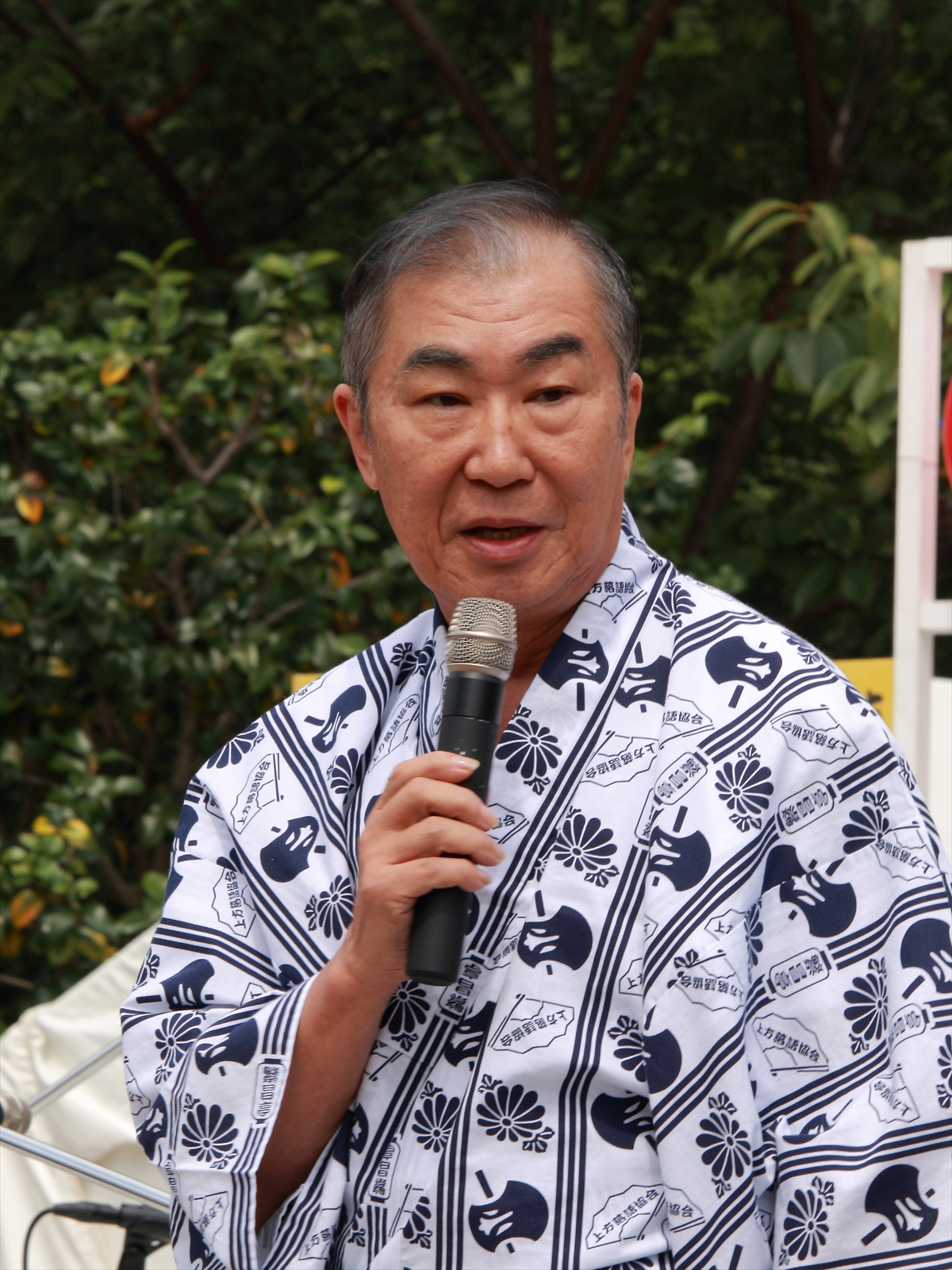
- Born: Kawamura Shizuya; 16 July 1943 (age 83); Sakai, Osaka Prefecture, Japan

Comedy career
- Years active: 1964–present
- Medium: Stand up, television
- Genre: Rakugo

Shizuya Kawamura (河村 靜也, Kawamura Shizuya), known by his stage name Katsura Bunshi VI (六代 桂 文枝, Rokudai Katsura Bunshi), is a Japanese TV presenter and rakugo artist.

His former stage name was Katsura Sanshi (桂 三枝, Katsura Sanshi). Sanshi received this name from his shishô (master) and one of the celebrated postwar Kamigata Rakugo greats, Katsura Bunshi V (五代目 桂 文枝, Godaime Katsura Bunshi; 1930-2005). Sanshi's "san" came from, originally, being Bunshi's third deshi (pupil) and "shi" came from the second half of shishos stage name. Sanshi succeeded his shisho's stage name in 2012.

== Earlier years ==
Sanshi was born in Higashi-ward, Sakai, Osaka on 16 July 1943. His father died when he was an 11-month-old baby. Despite early unfortunate circumstances, his efforts in the entertainment business have brought him success.

== Youth ==
Sanshi entered Kansai University (Faculty of commerce), after graduating from Ichioka Commercial High School in Osaka. He immediately gained fans at University with his storytelling and humor, though he had no professional careers. After university, Sanshi entered the artistic school or Katsura Bunshi V and later signed with agents at Yoshimoto Kogyo.

== TV presenter ==
Sanshi worked as a master of ceremonies on:

=== Punch De Date ===
An audience participation matching and marriage TV program produced by Kansai Telecasting Corporation and broadcast from 1973 to 1985 co-starring Kiyoshi Nishikawa. The show's opening catchphrase was "Hitome atta sono hi kara, koi no hana saku koto mo aru, mishiranu anata to mishiranu anata ni, date o torimotsu Punch De Date!" (approximate translation: Even though they are not acquainted with each other, the pairings will bring us shot-gun couples. Punch De Date makes amazing matches!).

=== Shinkonsan Irasshai ===
An audience participation program featuring honeymoon couples. Using Sanshi's original pitch and tone, the opening phrase "Irasshai!" (Welcome!) was his trademark.

== Filmography ==
=== Films ===
- Porco Rosso (1992), Mr. Piccolo (voice)
- Notomitori Samurai (2018), Tanuma Okitsugu

=== Television ===
- Sanada Maru (2016), Sen no Rikyū
- guest judge on Iron Chef Japan for the 100th challenger episode featuring lotus roots & challenger Toshiro Kandagawa

== Recent Activities ==
Sanshi is on the board of the Kamigata Rakugo Kyoukai (Rakugo artists and performers' Guild in Kansai region), and is the director of Yoshimoto Kogyo.

In the rakugo world, Sanshi is known mostly for his "New rakugo" (in Japanese "創作落語"). He has been a guest professor at Kansai University.

== Sanshi School ==
Sanshi has many deshi apprentices and all of them have been given stage names that have the "san" (number 3, 三), for example, Katsura SANpo, Katsura SANpu, Katsura SANpatsu, Katsura SANshain, and so on.

== Awards ==
- 2006 Osaka Culture Prize — Culture Special Prize
