= San'yūtei Enraku V =

Japanese rakugo comedian (1932-2009)

- 5代目 三遊亭 圓楽
- Born: Hiroumi Yoshikawa; December 29, 1932; Tokyo, Japan
- Died: October 29, 2009 (aged 76)
- Notable work: Shōten

Comedy career
- Genre: Rakugo

5th Sanyutei Enraku (5代目 三遊亭 圓楽, Godaime San'yūtei Enraku; December 29, 1932 - October 29, 2009) was a Japanese rakugo comedian best known for hosting the Shōten comedy show on Nippon TV. His comedic career spanned several decades.

He was born Hiroumi Yoshikawa (吉河 寛海, Yoshikawa Hiroumi) and at the time used Enraku as his stage name. He was known using the Japanese comedic style of rakugo, in which a single performer or storyteller appears on stage and tells comedic stories to the audience. Enraku's last public rakugo performance took place at the National Engei Hall in Tokyo in February 2007.

Sanyutei Enraku died of lung cancer on October 29, 2009, at the age of 76.
