= Rakugo =

Traditional Japanese verbal entertainment

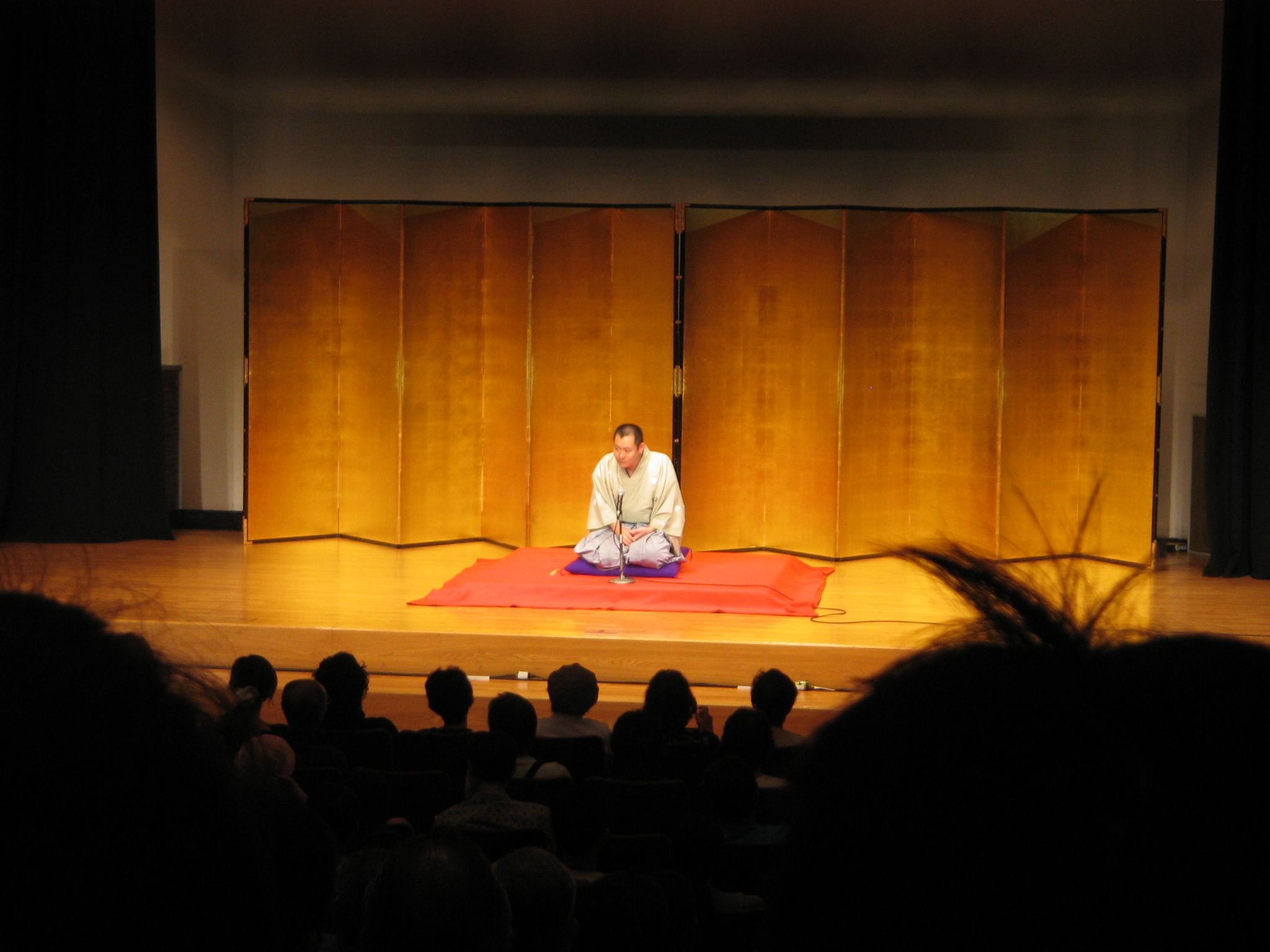
Rakugoka at Sanma Festival

Rakugo (落語; literally 'story with a fall') is a form of Japanese verbal comedy, traditionally performed in yose theatres. The lone storyteller (落語家, rakugoka) sits on a raised platform, a kōza (高座). Using only a paper fan (扇子, sensu) and a small cloth (手拭, tenugui) as props, and without standing up from the seiza sitting position, the rakugo artist depicts a long and complicated comical (or sometimes sentimental) story. The story always involves the dialogue of two or more characters. The difference between the characters is depicted only through change in pitch, tone, and a slight turn of the head.

== Description ==
The speaker is in the middle of the stage, and their purpose is to stimulate the general hilarity with tone and limited, yet specific body gestures. The monologue always ends with a narrative stunt (punch line) known as ochi (落ち; lit. "fall") or sage (下げ; lit. "lowering"), consisting of a sudden interruption of the wordplay flow. Twelve kinds of ochi are codified and recognized, with more complex variations having evolved through time from the more basic forms.

Early rakugo has developed into various styles, including the shibaibanashi (芝居噺; theatre discourses), the ongyokubanashi (音曲噺; musical discourses), the kaidanbanashi (怪談噺; ghost discourses, see kaidan), and ninjōbanashi (人情噺; sentimental discourses). In many of these forms the ochi, which is essential to the original rakugo, is absent.

Rakugo has been described as "a sitcom with one person playing all the parts" by Noriko Watanabe, assistant professor in the Department of Modern Languages and Comparative Literature at Baruch College.

== Lexical background ==
The precursor of rakugo was called karukuchi (軽口; literally 'light-mouth'). The oldest appearance of the kanji which refers specifically to this type of performance dates back to 1787, but at the time the characters themselves (落とし噺) were normally read as otoshibanashi ("dropping story").

In the middle of the Meiji period (1868–1912) the expression rakugo first started being used, and it came into common usage only in the Shōwa period (1926–1989).

== History ==
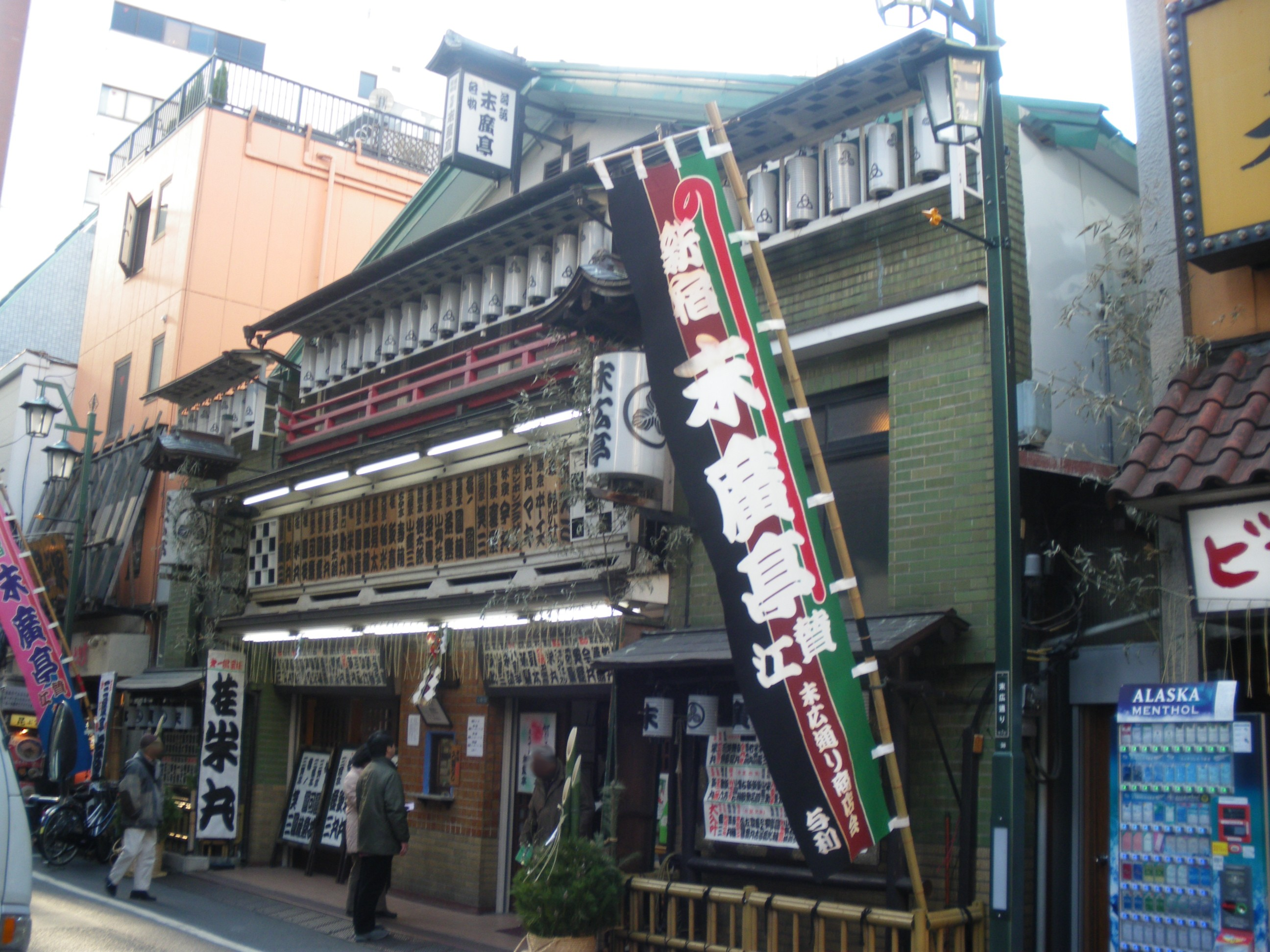
Shinjuku suehirotei is a famous vaudeville theater in Tokyo which hosts rakugo events.

One of the predecessors of rakugo is considered to be a humorous story in setsuwa. The Konjaku Monogatarishū and the Uji Shūi Monogatari were setsuwa collections compiled from the Heian period (794–1185) to the Kamakura period (1185–1333); they contained many funny stories, and Japanese Buddhist monks preached Buddhism by quoting them. In Makura no Sōshi, it is described that the monks had gained a reputation for their beautiful voices and narrative arts.

The direct ancestor of rakugo is a humorous story among the stories narrated by otogishū in the Sengoku Period (1467–1615). Otogishū were scholars, Buddhist monks and tea masters who served daimyo (feudal lords), and their duty was to give lectures on books to daimyo and to be a partner for chatting. Anrakuan Sakuden, who was an otogishū and a monk of the Jōdo-shū, is often said to be the originator of rakugo, and his 8 volumes of Seisui Sho contain 1000 stories, including the original stories of rakugo.

Around 1670 in the Edo period (1603–1867), three storytellers appeared who were regarded as the first rakugoka. Tsuyuno Gorobe in Kyoto, Yonezawa Hikohachi in Osaka, and Shikano Buzaemon in Edo built simple huts around the same age and began telling funny stories to the general public for a price. Rakugo in this period was called Tsujibanashi, but once it lost popularity, rakugo declined for about 100 years.

In 1786, Utei Emba presided over a rakugo show at a ryōtei, a traditional Japanese catering venue, in Mukōjima. He is regarded as the father of the restoration of rakugo. His performances led to the establishment of the first theater dedicated to rakugo (yose) by Sanshōtei Karaku and Sanyūtei Enshō, and the revival of rakugo.

During the Edo period, thanks to the emergence of the merchant class of the chōnin, rakugo spread to the lower classes. Many groups of performers were formed, and collections of texts were finally printed. During the 17th century the actors were known as hanashika (found written as 噺家, 咄家, or 話家; "storyteller"), corresponding to the modern term, rakugoka (落語家; "person of the falling word").

Before the advent of modern rakugo there were the kobanashi (小噺): short comical vignettes ending with an ochi, popular between the 17th and the 19th centuries. These were enacted in small public venues, or in the streets, and printed and sold as pamphlets. The origin of kobanashi is to be found in the Kinō wa kyō no monogatari (Yesterday Stories Told Today, c. 1620), the work of an unknown author collecting approximately 230 stories describing the common class.

== Types of ochi ==
Niwaka ochi: An ochi using a pun, it is also called 'Jiguchi Ochi.'

Hyoshi ochi: An ochi that uses repeated punchlines.

Sakasa ochi: An ochi with a twist punchline, one where roles are reversed

Kangae ochi: A punchline that is hard to understand but people will laugh after pondering for a while.

Mawari ochi: A punchline that ends the story by returning to the beginning.

Mitate ochi: An ochi that uses unexpected punchlines.

Manuke ochi: An ochi that ends the story with a dumb or ridiculous joke

Totan ochi: An ochi using a signature phrase.

Buttsuke ochi: An ending with a punch line based on a misunderstanding.

Shigusa ochi: A punchline that uses a physical gesture.

== Important contributors ==
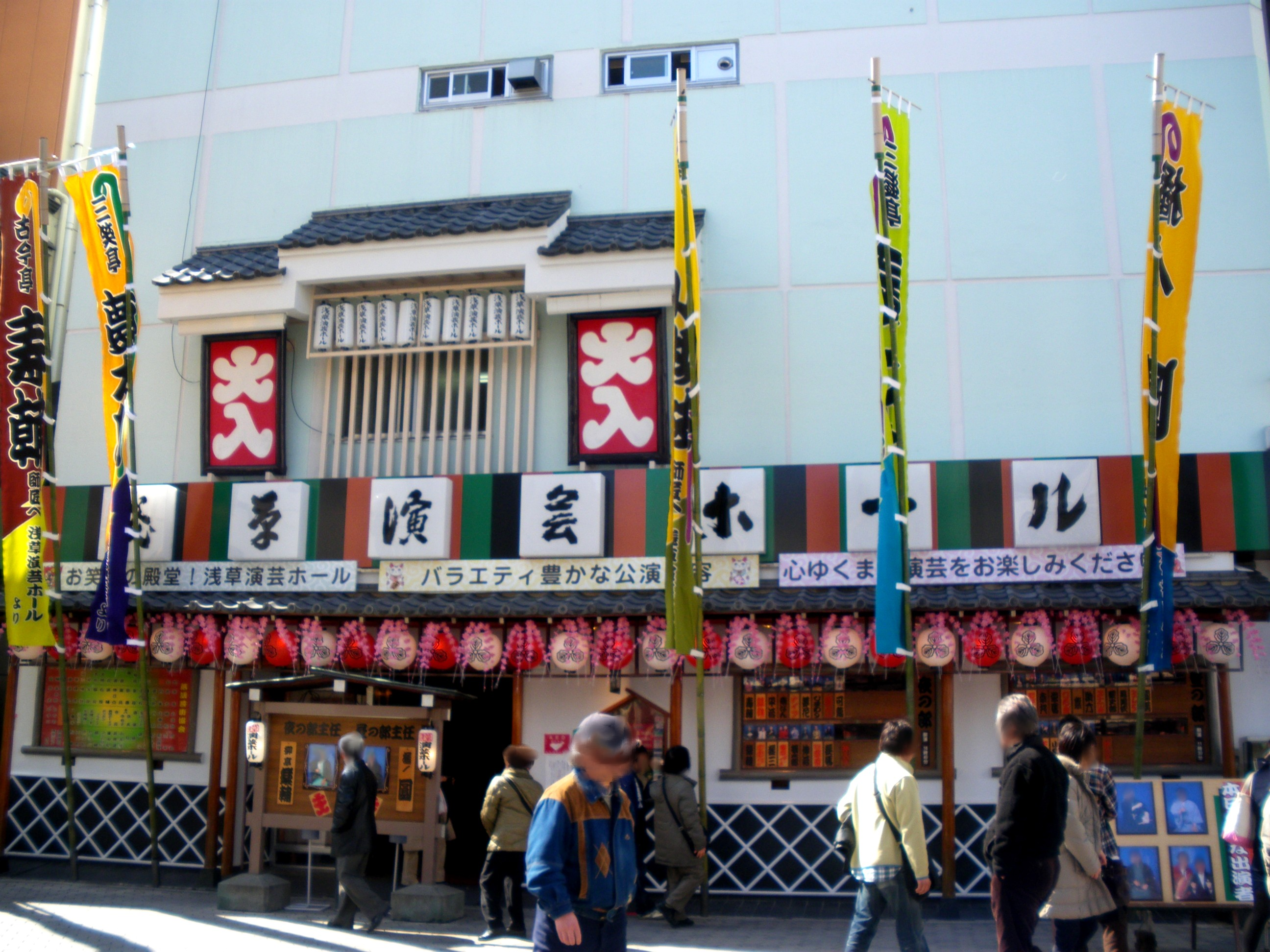
Asakusa Engei Hall is another famous vaudeville theater in Tokyo which hosts rakugo events.

Many artists contributed to the development of rakugo. Some were simply performers, but many also composed original works.

Among the more famous rakugoka of the Tokugawa period were performers like Anrakuan Sakuden (1554–1642), the author of the Seisuishō (Laughter to Chase Away Sleep, 1628), a collection of more than 1,000 stories. In Edo (today's Tokyo) there also lived Shikano Buzaemon (1649–1699) who wrote the Shikano Buzaemon kudenbanashi (Oral Instruction Discourses of Shikano Buzaemon) and the Shika no makifude (The Deer's Brush, 1686), a work containing 39 stories, eleven of which are about the kabuki milieu. Tatekawa Enba I (1743–1822) was author of the Rakugo rokugi (The Six Meanings of Rakugo).

Kyoto was the home of Tsuyu no Gorobei I (1643–1703), who is considered the father of the rakugo tradition of the Kamigata area (Kamigata rakugo (上方落語)). His works are included in the Karukuchi tsuyu ga hanashi (Jocular Tsuyu's Stories, date of composition unknown), containing many word games, episodes from the lives of famous literary authors, and plays on the dialects of the Tokyo, Osaka, and Kyoto areas.

Of a similar structure is the Karukuchi gozen otoko (One-liners: An Important Storyteller, date of publication unknown) in which are collected the stories of Yonezawa Hikohachi I, who lived in Ōsaka towards the end of the 17th century. An example from Yonezawa Hikohachi's collection:

A man faints in a bathing tub. In the great confusion following, a doctor arrives who takes his pulse and calmly gives the instructions: "Pull the plug and let the water out." Once the water has flowed completely out of the tub he says: "Fine. Now put a lid on it and carry the guy to the cemetery."

For the poor man is already dead. The joke becomes clearer when one notes that a Japanese traditional bathing tub is shaped like a coffin.

=== Current performers ===
Current rakugo artists include Tachibanaya Enzō, Katsura Bunshi VI, Tachibanaya Takezō II, Tatekawa Shinosuke and Hayashiya Shōzō IX. Furthermore, many people regarded as more mainstream comedians originally trained as rakugoka apprentices, even adopting stage names given to them by their masters. Some examples include Akashiya Sanma, Shōfukutei Tsurube II, and Shōfukutei Shōhei. Another famous rakugo performer, Shijaku Katsura II, was known outside Japan for his performances of rakugo in English. English rakugo performances have been studied for how they convey traditional Japanese cultural values through adapted scripts, making the art form more accessible while preserving its original narrative style.

== Titles and repertoire ==
Rakugo stories are generally divided into two categories: classical repertoire stories (koten rakugo, 古典落語) and original stories (shinsaku rakugo, 新作落語). Koten rakugo consists of traditional tales that, in principle, can be adapted and performed by any storyteller. In contrast, shinsaku rakugo refers to new, original works created by individual performers. As the copyright holders, these performers must grant permission before their stories can be performed by others. While some classical repertoire stories are attributed to specific authors, these authors have often been deceased for a considerable time, allowing the stories to enter the shared repertoire.

Notable examples of classical repertoire stories include:

- The Peony Lantern (Botan Dōrō) (ja:牡丹灯籠, Botandōrō) – a kaidanbanashi, or ghost story
- Jugemu (ja:寿限無, Jugemu) – the life of a boy with a ridiculously long name
- Manjuu kowai (ja:饅頭こわい, Manjuu kowai; Manjū are scary) – a group of boys try to scare off a boaster
- Meguro no Sanma (ja:目黒のさんま, Meguro no sanma; Pacific saury of Meguro) – a naive lord enjoys commoners' foods
- Momotarō (桃太郎, Momotarō) – a meta-joke in which a son mocks his father for telling the Japanese folktale "Momotarō" poorly
- Mt. Head (ja:頭山, Atamayama) – a tree begins growing out of a man's head
- Neko no sara (ja:猫の皿, Neko no sara; The cat's plate) – a man tries to outwit the owner of a piece of antique porcelain
- Shibahama (ja:芝浜, Shibahama) – a good-for-nothing husband finds a huge sum of money
- Teresuko (ja:てれすこ, Teresuko) – cash reward to whom that could identify a strange fish

== Notable rakugoka ==
=== Edo (Tokyo) ===
- Hayashiya Kikuō (formerly Hayashiya Kikuzō I)
- Hayashiya Konpei
- Hayashiya Sanpei I
- Hayashiya Shōzō IX
- Hayashiya Taihei
- Kairakutei Black I (Henry Black)
- Katsura Utamaru
- Katsura Yonesuke
- Kokontei Shinchō
- Kokontei Shinshō
- Reireisya Bafū
- Reireisya Suzumaru (Yamada Takao)
- Ryūtei Chiraku
- San'yūtei Enchō
- San'yūtei Enraku V
- San'yūtei Enraku VI (formerly San'yūtei Rakutarō)
- San'yūtei Kōraku
- San'yūtei Koyūza
- Sanshōtei Yumenosuke
- Shunpūtei Koasa
- Shunpūtei Ryūshō
- Shunpūtei Shōta
- Tachibanaya Enzō
- Tachibanaya Takezō
- Tatekawa Danshi
- Tatekawa Shinosuke
- Yanagiya Kosan
- Yanagiya Kosanji

=== Kamigata (Osaka and Kyoto) ===
- Hayashiya Somemaru IV
- Katsura Beichō
- Katsura Bunchin
- Katsura Bunshi V
- Katsura Bunshi VI (formerly Katsura Sanshi)
- Katsura Harudanji
- Katsura Shijaku II
- Katsura Sunshine
- Shōfukutei Kakushow
- Shōfukutei Matsunosuke
- Shōfukutei Nikaku
- Shōfukutei Shōkaku
- Shōfukutei Tsurube
- Showko Showfukutei
- Tsukitei Happō
- Tsukitei Hōsei (formerly Yamasaki Hōsei)
- Tsukitei Kachō
- Tsuyoshi Ihara

== See also ==
- Akane-banashi
- Descending Stories: Showa Genroku Rakugo Shinju
- Fallen Words
- Joshiraku
- Mt. Head
- Kyōgen
- Manzai
- Stand-up comedy
