= Help Yourself =

Help Yourself may refer to:

== Films ==
- Help Yourself (1920 film), a 1920 American comedy film directed by Hugo Ballin
- Help Yourself (film), a 1932 British comedy film

== Literature ==
- Help Yourself (book), a 2001 book by Dave Pelzer
- Help Yourself (play), 1936 Broadway play by John J. Coman

== Music ==
=== Groups ===
- Help Yourself (band), a 1970s rock group

=== Albums ===
- Help Yourself (Tom Jones album), 1968
- Help Yourself (Eddy Clearwater album), 1992
- Help Yourself (Faye Wong album), 1997
- Help Yourself (Julian Lennon album), a 1991 album by Julian Lennon and its title song
- Help Yourself (Peggy Scott-Adams album)

=== Songs ===
- "Help Yourself" (Tom Jones song), Tom Jones' cover of a popular song and the name of Jones' eponymously titled 1968 album
- "Help Yourself" (Amy Winehouse song), a 2003 song by Amy Winehouse
- "Help Yourself (To All of My Lovin')", a 1968 single by James & Bobby Purify
- "Help Yourself", a 1978 single by Brass Construction
- "Help Yourself", an original song by Sad brad smith for the Oscar-nominated film, Up in the Air (2009)
- "Help Yourself", a track from the 2019 Jeff Lynne's ELO album From Out of Nowhere
