= Undisputed Queen =

Studio album by Peggy Scott-Adams
- Released: June 15, 1999
- Recorded: 1999
- Genre: Soul, R&B, Blues
- Length: 47:27
- Label: Miss Butch
- Producer: Jimmy Lewis

Peggy Scott-Adams chronology
Contagious (1997)	Undisputed Queen (1999)	Live in Alabama & More (2000)

Undisputed Queen is the third studio album by soul singer, Peggy Scott-Adams. The album included the singles, "That's How I Do It" "Mommy's No Dummy" "It Ain't All Good" "When You're Married To a Fool" and "You Will Always Be My Man."

== Track listing ==
1. "That's How I Do It"
2. "Let The Door It Ya!"
3. "That's OK with Me"
4. "It Ain't All Good"
5. "Mommy's No Dummy"
6. "When You're Married to a Fool"
7. "You Will Always Be My Man"
8. "Be Careful In The Name of Love"
9. "You're Too Freaky for Me"
10. "I'm Willing To Be Your Friend"
