= Busting Loose (album) =

Studio album by Peggy Scott-Adams
- Released: June 17, 2003
- Recorded: 2002–2003
- Genre: Soul, R&B, blues
- Length: 55:23
- Label: Miss Butch
- Producer: Jimmy Lewis

Busting Loose is the sixth album by soul singer, Peggy Scott-Adams. The album peaked at number 12 on the Billboard Top Blues Albums chart. The album included the hit singles, "If You Wanna Hear Me Holler, Lick Me Up Some Dollars", and "See You Next Weekend", the latter of which was co-written by Scott-Adams.

== Track listing ==
1. "If You Wanna Hear Me Holler, Lick Me Up Some Dollars"
2. "I've Had It With You"
3. "Freddy This, Freddy That"
4. "Good Little House Wife"
5. "I'm Changing (A Tribute to Johnny Taylor)"
6. "A Good Woman Thinking Bad"
7. "A Woman Knows How to Please Herself"
8. "Love Me Like I Want You To"
9. "When Did You Leave Heaven"
10. "See You Next Weekend"
11. "Hi Class, Lo Class, No Class"
12. "Fresh Out of Tears"
