= Keisuke Kuwata =

Japanese singer-songwriter (born 1956)

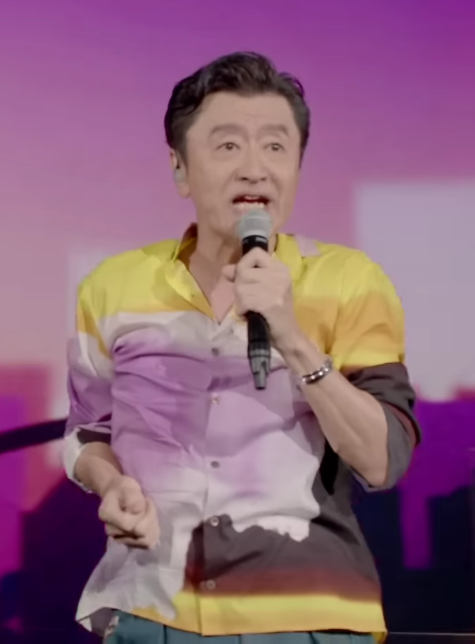
- Kuwata performing in 2022

Background information
- Born: February 26, 1956 (age 70); Chigasaki, Kanagawa, Japan
- Genres: Rock; pop; blues; folk; kayōkyoku
- Occupations: Musician; singer-songwriter; producer; film score composer
- Instruments: Vocals; guitar; bass guitar; drums; keyboards
- Years active: 1974–present
- Label: Victor Entertainment
- Member of: Southern All Stars
- Website: Southern All Stars

Keisuke Kuwata (Japanese: 桑田 佳祐, Hepburn: Kuwata Keisuke; born February 26, 1956) is a Japanese singer-songwriter and multi-instrumentalist, best known as frontman of the rock band Southern All Stars. He also has a successful solo career and has worked as a record producer, film composer, and film director.

In 2003, Southern All Stars was ranked No. 1 and Kuwata himself was ranked No. 12 on HMV Japan's list of the top 100 Japanese musical acts. In 2014, the Japanese government awarded Kuwata the Medal with Purple Ribbon for his contributions to the arts.

== Biographical information ==
Keisuke Kuwata was born February 26, 1956, and raised in Chigasaki, Kanagawa, Japan. He went to Aoyama Gakuin University.

Kuwata's wife, Yuko Hara, is also a member of the Southern All Stars. She is a vocalist and plays keyboards. The two met while in college, where they were in the same circle of musicians. They married in 1982, after the success of the band's single "Chako no Kaiganmonogatari", and invited 3000 fans of the band to their wedding reception. They share a love of the blues and have two sons together.

On July 28, 2010, Kuwata announced that he had been diagnosed with esophageal cancer. The operation to remove the cancer was successful and he has made several public appearances since June 2011.

Kuwata wrote and performed both the opening theme song, "Hitotarashi", and the ending theme, "Akane on My Mind: Manjū Kowai", for the 2026 Akane-banashi anime adaptation.

== Musical style ==
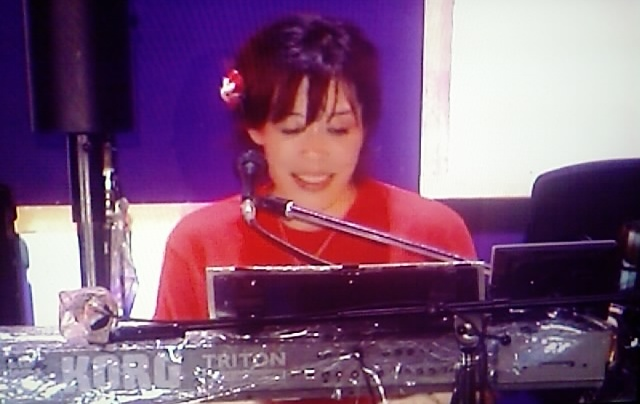
Kuwata's wife, Yuko Hara, performing with their band, Southern All Stars in August 2008

Kuwata plays guitar, bass, drums and keyboards. For one album, Suteki Na Mirai Wo Mite Hoshii (素敵な未来を見て欲しい), Kuwata played every musical instrument and recorded the entire album himself.

Kuwata's Western musical influences are varied. Along with his wife, the band's keyboardist and backing vocalist, Yuko Hara, the couple have long been inspired by American folk music, where preferences run from Bob Dylan, the Band, Blues, and Southern rock music, to British and American influences that are arguably pure rock and Roll; with a flattering number of songs covered from the work of Eric Clapton.

Aside from Dylan, Kuwata's work has shown emphasis on music of the American South, including that of Creedence Clearwater Revival and Little Feat. Along with the Southern All Stars, Kuwata has performed with Little Feat on several occasions, and recorded cover songs from the band. He was a participant and performer in a tribute concert to the late Lowell George, (Little Feat's original frontman), recording a medley on video that contained his version of "Dixie Chicken".

In 1990, American musician Ray Charles released an English-language version of "Ellie My Love", a song whose music and original Japanese lyrics were written by Kuwata, on Charles's album Would You Believe? The song was already successful in Japan prior to the album's release, having been used in a Japanese television commercial.

In 1991, Kuwata began a series of concerts, similar to MTV Unplugged performances, called the "Acoustic Revolution", featuring Hirokazu Ogura on guitar, and Yoshiyuki Sahashi on mandolin, along with other musicians using acoustic instruments. Here again, Dylan's influence shone through their work choosing standards including "Like a Rolling Stone".

Kuwata also developed a love for rock music. The influence from Eric Clapton is strong and can be heard even when Kuwata performs songs in same manner and style as those that Clapton himself covered, and did not write. In addition, other artists covered have been Jimi Hendrix, Bob Marley, and Sam Cooke.

In 1994, the "On Air Music Fair", "I Shot the Sheriff" by Bob Marley was performed by Kuwata and Ann Lewis.

== Philanthropy ==
Kuwata has performed with his band, and collaborated with several others annually to donate money towards AIDS research and treatment. To draw the largest possible audiences, Kuwata performs additional Western songs so the concerts are more inclusive. Depending upon the year of the concert, sometimes the chosen songs have a theme.

Kuwata has been joined in benefit concerts by other bands and musicians. Most notable is the frequent appearance of Yamagen, a band featuring guitarists Hirokazu Ogura (小倉 博和, Ogura Hirokazu) and Yoshiyuki Sahashi (佐橋 佳幸, Sahashi Yoshiyuki). The band features a combination of jazz, blues, and rock, along with their own combination of ambient experimental music. Yamagen is considered a "guitar support unit", in the same way Westerners would think of a horn section. Some of these concert songs included:

- 1996 Theme: Jazz Cafe
- 1997 Theme: Kayou Suspense Theater
- 1998 Theme: All Request Show
- 1999 Theme: Eric Claptoso
  - "Little Wing", by Jimi Hendrix, and "Why Does Love Got to Be So Sad?", recorded by Eric Clapton several decades earlier.
- 2000 Theme: Best Songs of The 20th Century Selected By Kuwata
- 2001 Theme: Plays The Beatles
- 2003 Theme: Disco And Soul Of Glory
- 2004 Theme: The Golden Age Of British Rock
  - "Time" by Pink Floyd, "Highway Star" by Deep Purple, "We Will Rock You" by Queen.
- 2006 Theme: Stars And Stripes Forever!? My American Heros
  - "Proud Mary" by Creedence Clearwater Revival
- 2008 Theme: Hitori Kohaku Utagassen 1
- 2009 Theme: Movie Songs
- 2013 Theme: Hitori Kohaku Utagassen 2

== Discography ==
=== Studio albums and mini-albums ===
- Keisuke Kuwata (July 9, 1988)
- Solitude Soleil (孤独の太陽, Kodoku no Taiyō; 'The Sun of Solitude', September 23, 1994)
- Rock and Roll Hero (September 26, 2002)
- Musicman (February 23, 2011)
- Garakuta (がらくた; 'Junk', August 23, 2017)
- Gohan Misoshiru Nori Otsukemono Tamagoyaki feat. Umeboshi (ごはん味噌汁海苔お漬物卵焼き feat. 梅干し; mini-album, September 15, 2021)

=== Singles ===
- "Kanashī Kimochi (Just a Man in Love)" (悲しい気持ち (JUST A MAN IN LOVE); 'Sad Feelings (Just a Man in Love)', 1987)
- "Itsuka Dokokade (I Feel the Echo)" (いつか何処かで (I FEEL THE ECHO); 'Somewhere Some Time (I Feel the Echo)', 1988)
- "Mayonaka no Dandy" (真夜中のダンディー; 'Midnight's Dandy', 1993)
- "Tsuki" (月; 'Moon', 1994)
- "Matsuri no Ato" (祭りのあと; 'After the Carnival', 1994)
- "Naminori Jonī" (波乗りジョニー; 'Johnny the Surfer', 2001)
- "Shiroi Koibito-tachi" (白い恋人達; 'White Lovers', 2001)
- "Tokyo" (東京, Tōkyō; 2002)
- "Ashita Harerukana" (明日晴れるかな; 'Will it Be Sunny Tomorrow?', 2007)
- "Kaze no Uta wo Kikasete" (風の詩を聴かせて; 'Listen to the Wind's Song', 2007)
- "Darling" (ダーリン, Dārin; 2007)
- "Kimi ni Sayonara wo" (君にサヨナラを; 'Good-Bye to You', 2009)
- "Hontō ha Kowai Ai to Romance" (本当は怖い愛とロマンス; 'The Truth About Love and Romance', 2010)
- "Asu e no March" / "Let's Try Again -Kuwata Keisuke Ver.-" / "Hadaka de Ondo -Matsuri da!! Naked-" (明日へのマーチ/Let's try again 〜kuwata keisuke ver.〜/ハダカ DE 音頭 〜祭りだ!! Naked〜; 2011)
- "Yin Yang" / "Namida wo Buttobase!!" / "Oishī Himitsu" (Yin Yang/涙をぶっとばせ!!/おいしい秘密; 2013)
- "Yoshiko-san" (ヨシ子さん; 2016)
- "Kimi e no Tegami" (君への手紙; 'A Letter to You', 2016)
- "Hitotarashi" (人誑し / ひとたらし; 2026)

=== Compilation albums ===
- From Yesterday (フロム イエスタデイ; June 27, 1992)
- Top of the Pops (November 27, 2002)
- I Love You - Now & Forever - (July 18, 2012)
- Itsumo Dokokade (いつも何処かで; November 23, 2022)

=== Live albums ===
- Kamon Yūzō & Victor Wheels Live (嘉門雄三 & VICTOR WHEELS LIVE!; March 2, 1982)

=== With Kuwata Band ===
- "Ban Ban Ban" (April 5, 1986)
- "Skipped Beat" (スキップ・ビート; July 5, 1986)
- "Merry Christmas in Summer" (July 5, 1986)
- Nippon no Rock Band (July 14, 1986)
- One Day (November 5, 1986)
- Rock Concert (live album, December 5, 1986)

=== With Super Chimpanzee ===
- "Kuri to Itsumademo" (クリといつまでも; 'Kuri Forever', September 26, 1991)
- "Kuri to Itsumademo no Karaoke-tsuki" (クリといつまでものカラオケ付き; 'Kuri Forever Karaoke Version', November 21, 1991)

=== With other artists ===
- "Kiseki no Hoshi" (奇跡の地球; 'Earth of Miracle', 1995) with Mr. Children
- "Let's Try Again" (2011) with Team Amuse!!
- "Kissin' Christmas (Christmas Dakara Janai)" (Kissin' Christmas (クリスマスだからじゃない); 2012) with Kuwata Keisuke & His Friends
- "Shizuka na Legend" (静かな伝説; 2014) with Mariya Takeuchi
- "Budda no Yō ni Watashi wa Shinda" (ブッダのように私は死んだ; 2020) with Fuyumi Sakamoto
- "Jidai Okure no Rock 'n' Roll Band" (時代遅れのRock'n'Roll Band; 2022) with Motoharu Sano, Masanori Sera, Char and Goro Noguchi
- "Kissin' Christmas (Christmas Dakara Janai) 2023" (Kissin' Christmas (クリスマスだからじゃない) 2023; 2023) with Yumi Matsutoya
- "Fukagawa no Akko-chan" (深川のアッコちゃん; 2025) with Junya Tauchi

=== Film work ===
Kuwata directed the movie, Inamura Jane, for which he composed the music. It was released on September 8, 1990, by Toho. Previously, he composed the music for Aiko 16-sai in 1983, which won the Award of the Japanese Academy for Newcomer of the Year, and the Yokohama Film Festival's Festival Prize for Yasuko Tomita as Best New Actress. He has also written the scores for several Japanese films. Kuwata wrote the theme song, "Ashita Hareru Kana", featured in the popular Japanese television drama series, Operation Love, which won the award for "Best Television Theme Song" at the 53rd Japanese Television Awards, in 2007.

Kuwata is known as a skilled whistler and whistled demos of his music before writing the lyrics. In 2025, director Naoto Kumazawa asked Southern All Stars to make the theme song for Banjo no Himawari/Sunflower On The Chessboard. Kuwata sent in a whistled version of the song, called "Two People in the Twilight City", and Kumazawa and his theme liked it, and kept it in.

== Honors ==
- Medal with Purple Ribbon (2014)
