= Would You Believe =

Would You Believe may refer to:

== Music ==
=== Albums ===
- Would You Believe (Billy Nicholls album) or the title song, 1968
- Would You Believe? (Hollies album), 1966
- Would You Believe? (Ray Charles album), 1990

=== Songs ===
- "Would You Believe" (song), by Ace of Base, 2015
- "Would You Believe", by Daniel Karlsson a.k.a. The Moniker, 2008
- "Would You Believe?", by Roxy Music from Roxy Music, 1972
- "Would You Believe", by Screaming Lord Sutch from Lord Sutch and Heavy Friends, 1970
- "Would You Believe?", by Stereophonics from Scream Above the Sounds, 2017

== Television ==
- Would You Believe? (game show), a 1970-1974 Australian game show
- Would You Believe (TV series), an Irish religious programme

== See also ==
- Would You Believe It!, a 1929 British silent comedy film
