= Palzer =

Palzer may refer to:

- 29148 Palzer, outer main-belt asteroid
- Palzer (surname), German-language surname
