= Pelzer =

Pelzer (German, meaning "furrier") is an occupational surname. Notable people with the surname include:

- Dave Pelzer (born 1960), American author
- Frank Pelzer (1876–1944), American politician in Iowa
- Jacques Pelzer (1924–1994), Belgian musician
- Richard B. Pelzer (1965–2019), American public speaker, memoirist and author
- Teresa Pelzer (1825–1852), noblewoman buried in the Cerasi Chapel

== See also ==
- Pelzer, Indiana, an unincorporated community
- Pelzer, South Carolina, town in Anderson County, South Carolina, United States
- 16177 Pelzer, main-belt asteroid
