= Hot and Sassy =

Studio album by Peggy Scott-Adams
- Released: October 30, 2001
- Recorded: 2001
- Genres: Soul, R&B, blues
- Length: 49:32
- Label: Miss Butch
- Producer: Jimmy Lewis

Hot and Sassy is the fifth album by soul singer Peggy Scott-Adams. Includes the hit singles, "Mr. Right or Mr. Wrong", "You're Divorce Has Been Denied" and "If I'm Still Not Married."

== Track listing ==
1. "Mr. Right or Mr. Wrong"
2. "Your Divorce Has Been Denied"
3. "If It Ain't Broke Don’t Fix It"
4. "This Time It's About Me"
5. "Just Go Away"
6. "If I'm Still Not Married"
7. "If I Was Getting It At Home"
8. "I'm That Kinda Woman"
9. "You Got to Be Good to Me"
10. "Some Things You Just Don't Do"
11. "She's Getting Into My Pants"
