= Solomon King (film) =

1974 independent blaxpolitation film

- Theatrical release poster
- Directed by: Jack Bomay; Sal Watts
- Screenplay by: Sal Watts
- Story by: Jim Alston; James "Bootsie" Parker
- Produced by: Sal Watts; Restoration: Dennis Bartok
- Starring: Sal Watts
- Cinematography: Chuck Colwell; Phil Caplan
- Edited by: Chuck Colwell; Joe Holsen
- Music by: Jimmy Lewis; Carol L. King; Joyce Steiger
- Production companies: Sal/Wa Productions; Stage Struck, Inc. Omni Pictures Corp.
- Distributed by: Entertainment Pyramid Corp.
- Release dates: September 14, 1974 (Oakland, California); November 5, 1974 (Los Angeles)
- Running time: 88 or 110 minutes Restored: 85 minutes
- Country: United States
- Language: English
- Budget: $140,000

Solomon King is a 1974 independent blaxploitation film produced, written, co-directed, and starring Sal Watts, and featuring "Little Jamie" Watts, Claudia Russo, Felice Kinchelow, and Samaki Bennett, with baseball player Tito Fuentes as "Special Guest Star". The film was co-directed by Jack Bomay.

== Plot ==
Maney King is in a Middle Eastern country overseeing oil fields. When Prince Hassan starts a coup to take over the country, Maney escapes with Princess Oneeba, his brother's girlfriend. They head to Oakland, California, where his brother – Solomon King, a former special forces operative and CIA agent – is a rich and influential businessman. When the princess is killed, dying in Solomon's arms, he takes revenge, rounding up his former Green Beret pals to stage a counter-coup.

== Cast ==
- Sal Watts as Solomon King
- "Little Jamie" Watts as Maney King
- Claudia Russo as Princess Oneeba
- Felice Kinchelow as Albert
- Samaki Bennett as Samaki Miller
- Louis Zito as O'Malley
- Bernard B. Burton as Abdulla
- Richard Scarso as Hassan
- Joyce T. Watts as Teresa
- Belinda B. Burton as Jasmaine
- Tiny Powell as Uncle John
- Tito Fuentes as Himself
- C. B. Lyons as Preacher

== Production ==
Sal Watts was a businessman in Oakland, California who raised $140,000 from within the African American community to make this film in response to "black complaints about 'blaxploitation movies'". The working title was "Black Agent Lucky King". Production for the film took place from late 1973 to early 1974, with location shooting taking place in Oakland and around the San Francisco Bay area. The entire process of financing and making the film took two years.

The men's clothing for the film came from Watts' chain of clothing stores.

When the film premiered in Oakland, it ran two hours. Watts then trimmed it to 88 minutes.

As of the 2020s, the original negative and all other printing elements of the film were believed to have been lost. The UCLA Film and Television Archive owned a complete 35mm Eastman Kodak print, which was badly faded to pink and was damaged, and Watts' widow, Belinda Burton-Watts, had a 35mm sound track negative. From these Deaf Crocodile Films made a 4K restoration, which was released at the Fantastic Fest at the Alamo Drafthouse Cinema in Austin, Texas in 2022. The restored film is 85 minutes long.

== Songs ==
The soundtrack album was arranged and produced by Jimmy Lewis and features these 6 tracks. The 2026 reissue features bonus tracks.

- "Theme from Solomon King" written by Joyce Stiger
- "Ain't That Nothing" written by Joyce Stiger
- "Changes" written by Carol L. King, sung by Helena Hollins
- "Teach Me" written by Jimmy Lewis, sung by Jimmy Lewis
- "The Love Affair Is Over" written by Jimmy Lewis
- "Sad Feeling" written by Joyce Stiger.
