= Live in Alabama & More =

Remix album by Peggy Scott-Adams
- Released: May 2, 2000
- Recorded: 2000
- Genre: Soul, R&B, Blues
- Length: 54:43
- Label: Miss Butch
- Producer: Jimmy Lewis

Live in Alabama & More is a part live, mostly studio album by soul singer, Peggy Scott-Adams. It is her fourth album release. Includes the new hit singles, "Sweaty Men" and "When I'm With You."

== Track listing ==
1. "That's How I Do It" (Live)
2. "Burning" (Live)
3. "I'll Take Care of You" (Live)
4. "Sweaty Men" (New Smash)
5. "When I'm With You" (New Smash)
6. "I'm Getting What I Want" (2000 Millennium Mix)
7. "Her, You and His" (Hot to Trot Mix)
8. "Be Careful In The Name of Love" (Asses on the Floor Mix)
9. "Sweaty Men" (Doggie Style Mix)
10. "Sweaty Men" (Back That Thang Up Mix)
