= Help Yourself (Peggy Scott-Adams album) =

Studio album by Peggy Scott-Adams
- Released: 1997
- Recorded: 1996
- Genre: Soul; R&B; blues
- Length: 44:41
- Label: Miss Butch
- Producer: Jimmy Lewis

Help Yourself is the debut album by soul-blues singer Peggy Scott-Adams, released in 1997. The record peaked at No. 72 on the Billboard 200, and it includes the hit single "Bill". Other hits include "I'll Take Care of You", "Slow Drag", "I'm Getting What I Want", and the title track.

== Critical reception ==
Professional ratings
Review scores
Source	Rating
Muzik	7/10

The Baltimore Sun wrote that "where 'Bill' brings an unexpected twist to the spurned-woman blues style, the best the other songs can manage is a well-phrased line or two."

== Track listing ==
No.	Title	Length
1.	"Bill"	5:11
2.	"Help Yourself"	4:16
3.	"I'll Take Care of You"	3:56
4.	"You, Her and His"	4:40
5.	"Cleaning House"	4:01
6.	"I'm Getting What I Want"	4:32
7.	"Slow Drag"	4:59
8.	"I Don't Wanna Steal It"	3:56
9.	"Burning"	4:59
10.	"Part Time Lover, Full Time Fool"	4:11
Total length:		44:41

== Personnel ==
- Jimmy Lewis - arranged by, background vocals, producer
- Peggy Scott-Adams - vocals
- Rich Cason - arranged by, engineer, keyboards
