= Jo Jo Benson =

American R&B/soul singer (1938–2014)

- Born: Joseph M. Hewell; April 15, 1938; Phenix City, Alabama, U.S.
- Died: December 23, 2014 (aged 76) Columbus, Georgia, U.S.
- Genres: R&B, soul
- Occupations: Singer, club owner
- Label: SSS International

Joseph M. Hewell (April 15, 1938 – December 23, 2014) was an American R&B and soul singer better known under his stage name Jo Jo Benson. He was best known for his recordings in the late 1960s with Peggy Scott.

== Life and career ==
He was born in Phenix City, Alabama, and began singing in nightclubs when in his teens. He joined Chuck Willis as a backing singer in the 1950s, before joining forces with fellow singer Peggy Scott, who previously backed Ben E. King, in a duo. The pair were heard and encouraged by record producer Huey Meaux, and were recruited by Shelby Singleton's SSS International label in Nashville, Tennessee, in order to record duets. Their first recording for the label, "Lover's Holiday", reached No. 8 on the Billboard R&B chart and No. 31 on the pop chart in 1968, eventually becoming a gold record. They followed it up with "Pickin' Wild Mountain Berries", which was also a hit and for which they were nominated for a Grammy. Benson and Scott had two more hits in 1969, "Soulshake" and "I Want to Love You Baby", and released two albums together, Lover's Heaven and Soulshake.

The pairing of Benson and Scott split up in 1971. Benson later owned several nightclubs in the Chattahoochee Valley, and was seriously wounded in a shooting incident in 1979. He and Scott temporarily reunited in the mid-1980s for an album. In 1999, Benson recorded a solo album, Reminiscing in the Jam Zone, which Living Blues magazine called "among the finest soul albums of the year - indeed, of the decade". In 2001, he followed it up with the album Everybody Loves to Cha Cha Cha.

On December 23, 2014, Jo Jo Benson was found dead at a motel in Columbus, Georgia, at the age of 76. The coroner's office stated that he died of natural causes.

== Discography ==
=== Chart singles with Peggy Scott ===
Year	Single	Chart Positions	
Year	Single	US Pop	US R&B
1968	"Lover's Holiday"	31	8
1968	"Pickin' Wild Mountain Berries"	27	8
1969	"Soulshake"	37	13
1969	"I Want to Love You Baby"	81	24

=== Albums ===
==== With Peggy Scott ====
- Lover's Heaven (1969)
- Soulshake (1969)
- Nothing Can Stand In Our Way (1984)

==== Solo ====
- Reminiscing in the Jam Zone (1999)
- Everybody Loves to Cha Cha Cha (2001)
