= Akane-banashi =

Japanese manga series

- First tankōbon volume cover, featuring Akane and her father

あかね噺
- Genre: Comedy drama; Coming-of-age
- Manga
- Written by: Yuki Suenaga
- Illustrated by: Takamasa Moue
- Published by: Shueisha
- English publisher: NA: Viz Media
- Imprint: Jump Comics
- Magazine: Weekly Shōnen Jump
- Original run: February 14, 2022 – present
- Volumes: 24
- Anime television series
- Directed by: Ayumu Watanabe
- Written by: Michihiro Tsuchiya
- Music by: Akio Izutsu
- Studio: Zexcs
- Licensed by: Netflix (streaming): SEA: Medialink
- Original network: ANN (TV Asahi), BS Asahi, AT-X, TV Asahi Channel 1, Animax
- Original run: April 4, 2026 – present
- Episodes: 12
- icon

Akane-banashi (あかね噺; lit. 'Akane's Story') is a Japanese manga series written by Yuki Suenaga and illustrated by Takamasa Moue. It follows teenager Akane Osaki as she aims to reach the highest rank in rakugo, partly to avenge her father, who was expelled from the profession six years earlier. The rakugo in the series is supervised by professional rakugoka Kikuhiko Hayashiya. Akane-banashi has been serialized in Shueisha's shōnen manga magazine Weekly Shōnen Jump since February 2022, with the chapters collected in 24 tankōbon volumes as of October 2026. Viz Media has licensed the series for English release in North America. An anime television series adaptation produced by Zexcs aired from April to June 2026. A second season is set to premiere in January 2027.

Akane-banashi has received a positive reception from reviewers and has been nominated for various awards.

== Plot ==
Growing up, Akane admired her father and his rakugo, a traditional Japanese form of storytelling where a lone performer, called a rakugoka, depicts a long, complicated, and usually funny story involving multiple characters, who are distinguished by changes in pitch, tone, slight turns of the head, and hand movements, all while sitting in place. But when she was in elementary school, her father and all the other applicants were expelled from the Arakawa School during the promotional test to obtain rakugo's third and highest rank of shin'uchi. Six years later, Akane, who had been secretly receiving lessons from her father's former master, sets out to become a shin'uchi of the Arakawa School to avenge her father and prove rakugo is a legitimate profession.

== Characters ==
=== Osaki family ===
Akane Osaki (桜咲 朱音, Osaki Akane) / Akane Arakawa (阿良川 朱音, Arakawa Akane)
Voiced by: Akane Yamaguchi (voice comic), Anna Nagase (anime) (Japanese); Abby Trott (English)
A 17-year-old high school girl with a love of rakugo that she developed while watching her father, a former rakugoka. As a child, she got angry whenever a classmate or their parents looked down on her father for his chosen career, and hates that he was forced to give up his dream and get a "real job". Akane becomes a formal rakugoka apprentice, starting at the first rank known as zenza after graduating high school, under Shiguma Arakawa (VI).
Tohru Osaki (桜咲 徹, Osaki Tōru) / Shinta Arakawa (阿良川 志ん太, Arakawa Shinta)
Voiced by: Kappei Yamaguchi (voice comic), Jun Fukuyama (anime) (Japanese); Xander Mobus (English)
A former rakugoka who used the stage name "Shinta Arakawa" while studying under Shiguma Arakawa (VI); he was expelled following his shin'uchi promotion test. Before the shin'uchi test, he participated in futatsume events with his friends Chocho Konjakutei and Taizen Arakawa. After leaving the Arakawa School, he became a salaryman, selling concrete.
Masaki Osaki (桜咲 真幸, Osaki Masaki)
Voiced by: Shizuka Itō (Japanese); Rebecca Wang (English)

=== Arakawa School ===
Arakawa School rakugoka in Akane-banashi

Schools	Arakawa 阿良川
Shiguma (V) (Note: Founder of the Arakawa School, formerly Kiroku Kashiwaya (柏家 生禄)) 志ぐま
Masters (Note: All masters hold shin'uchi rank)	Issho (Note: Head of the Arakawa school) 一生	Shiguma (VI) (Note: Arakawa Arch 4) 志ぐま	Zensho 全生
Ikken 一剣	Maikeru まいける	Taizen 泰全
Kaisei (F) 魁生	Kaichi (Z) 嘉一	Yuzen (F) 悠全	Zenmai (Z) ぜんまい
Students (Note: Students are ranked according to ability and experience. In ascending order, these ranks are: (A) apprentice; (Z) zenza; (F) futatsume; (S) shin'uchi)	Kendama (Z) けん玉	Hikaru (F) (Note: Promoted during timeskip) ひかる	Taison (Z) 泰そん
Akane (F) 朱音	Koguma (F) こぐま	Kyoji (F) 享二	~~Shinta (F)~~ 志ん太	Guriko (F) ぐりこ

==== Arakawa masters ====
Issho Arakawa (阿良川 一生, Arakawa Isshō)
Voiced by: Yuki Tamai (voice comic), Akio Otsuka (anime) (Japanese); Evan Michael Lee (English)
The top-ranked master and head of the Arakawa School, who is considered one of the greatest rakugoka of his generation. Six years ago, he was the chief judge who expelled Akane's father and the other shin'uchi applicants. He is the first-born son of the Kurogane family who was disowned for his vow of independence, and later worked at Soba Shop Kikuhiko with Shiguma (VI). Educated in the Kashiwaya school as Kisoba Kashiwaya (柏家 生そば, Kashiwaya Kisoba).
Shiguma Arakawa (阿良川 志ぐま, Arakawa Shiguma) (VI)
Voiced by: Takuya Saito (voice comic), Masaki Terasoma (anime) (Japanese); Brook Chalmers (English)
The number two master of the Arakawa School who specializes in sentimental tales of the ninjo-banashi style and who taught Akane's father. After Shinta was expelled, Shiguma felt unfit to take on any more pupils. But he has been secretly teaching Akane rakugo for the last six years, and agrees to formally take her on as a pupil after she graduates high school, which is unusually late. Grew up without formal education in the backstreets of Tokyo, later working at Soba Shop Kikuhiko with Issho. Born as Yosuke Shiranami (白波洋輔, Shiranami Yōsuke), he was educated in the Kashiwaya school as Rokuen Kashiwaya (柏家 禄ゑん, Kashiwaya Rokuen) and later inherited the legendary myoseki stage name of his master, Shiguma Arakawa V (formerly Kiroku Kashiwaya), who also founded the Arakawa School.
Ikken Arakawa (阿良川 一剣, Arakawa Ikken)
Voiced by: Hiroaki Hirata (Japanese); Kirk Thornton (English)
The media-savvy master of the Arakawa School who also acts in the television drama Yin-Yang Cops. He is billed as the brains behind the Arakawa School.
Zensho Arakawa (阿良川 全生, Arakawa Zenshō)
Voiced by: Fumihiko Tachiki (Japanese); Rich Brown (English)
Zensho holds a grudge against Shiguma (VI); he is honest to his feelings. The grudge stems from Zensho's frustration: every rakugo he performs turns into a farce, as his overbearing personality shows through in each character, despite his best efforts to follow the teachings and example of Shiguma (V). After one particular performance, Shiguma (VI) told him that he has an enviable skill that allows the audience to connect with him; that admission of jealousy has fueled his grudge.
Taizen Arakawa (阿良川 泰全, Arakawa Taizen)
Nicknamed "The Furious". Before becoming a shin'uchi, he participated in futatsume events with his friends Shinta Arakawa and Chocho Konjakutei. After he tearfully begged Zensho for Shinta's reinstatement, Zensho made him feel responsible for the expulsion by telling him Issho faulted Taizen for not making a larger impact like Chocho after Taizen was promoted to shin'uchi, the year before the disastrous test.
Maikeru Arakawa (阿良川 まいける, Arakawa Maikeru)
Voiced by: Nobunaga Shimazaki (Japanese); Landon Mcdonald (English)
The most senior pupil under Master Shiguma after Shinta was expelled and a highly popular performer. He fancies himself a ladies' man and acts in a carefree manner, but is deeply caring to his master, fellow pupils, and is the closest student to Shinta. With his strong technical skill and charisma, Maikeru is immensely talented and excel at everything he does, including activities outside of rakugo. During the story, he passes his shin'uchi test.
Shiguma Arakawa (阿良川 志ぐま, Arakawa Shiguma) (V)
The founder of the Arakawa School; he was the master of both Issho (Kisoba) and Shiguma VI (Rokuen) in the Kashiwaya school and formerly used the stage name Kiroku Kashiwaya (柏家 生禄, Kashiwaya Kiroku) before he was expelled and revived the myoseki name Shiguma Arakawa, as the fifth to take that name. Served as an officer in the Japanese military during World War II at Rabaul.

==== Arakawa students ====
Guriko Arakawa (阿良川 ぐりこ, Arakawa Guriko)
Voiced by: Masayuki Suzuki (voice comic), Seiichiro Yamashita (anime) (Japanese); Darius Marquis Johnson (English)
Master Shiguma's youngest pupil until Akane; he joined shortly before Shinta was expelled and just recently reached rakugo's second rank of futatsume. Assigned to Taizen while Shiguma recovers.
Kyoji Arakawa (阿良川 享二, Arakawa Kyōji)
Voiced by: Yōhei Azakami (Japanese); Jonathon Ha (English)
A 28-year-old futatsume in his ninth year of rakugo under Master Shiguma. Ever since Shinta was expelled, Kyoji is the disciplinarian who keeps the other pupils in line. His seriousness makes the back-and-forth banter in his rakugo even funnier. He is a lightweight, and gets drunk after one sip of alcohol. He offers to take Akane under his wing. Educated in the Kashiwaya school as Kiyoichi Kashiwaya. Assigned to Zensho while Shiguma recovers.
Koguma Arakawa (阿良川 こぐま, Arakawa Koguma)
Voiced by: Chiaki Kobayashi (Japanese); Khoi Dao (English)
A 29-year-old futatsume in his 11th year of rakugo under Master Shiguma. He is a Tokyo University graduate and the Shiguma School's best terakoya; master of old literary teachings. He meticulously researches every rakugo story he performs, including the daily customs of the period it came from, and turns into a completely different person onstage as far as his appearance and demeanor. Assigned to Ikken while Shiguma recovers.
Kaisei Arakawa (阿良川 魁生, Arakawa Kaisei)
Voiced by: Akihisa Shiono (Japanese); Matt Shipman (English)
An obnoxious futatsume under Master Issho. He reached that rank at 19-years-old, after only two years of zenza apprenticeship. He is particularly skilled at portraying seductive characters, which makes his silly ones stand out even more. Initially knew Issho as a regular patron of his mother's bar who helped with her hospital bills.
Hikaru Arakawa (阿良川 ひかる, Arakawa Hikaru)
Voiced by: Rie Takahashi (Japanese); Anne Yatco (English)
Hikaru competed with Akane and Karashi in the Karaku Cup as Hikaru Koragi; specializes in "heart-warming rakugo" and the heretical "eight blind men" technique, which draws upon her strengths as a voice actress. She is a zenza studying under Master Ikken.
Kaichi Arakawa (阿良川 嘉一, Arakawa Kaichi)
Kaichi is one of the finalists in the Arakawa zenza renseikai event. He is in his 30s, a former salesman who was inspired by Master Issho to leave his job and make his audiences happy; officially, he is Akane's junior, as he joined the Arakawa School later than she did.
Taison Arakawa (阿良川 泰そん, Arakawa Taison)
Taison is a new zenza student of Arakawa school under Master Taizen. He joined the school in the 3 years timeskip when Akane was in France.

=== Other schools ===
Other rakugoka in Akane-banashi

Schools
Masters (Note: All masters hold shin'uchi rank)
Students (Note: Students are ranked according to ability and experience. In ascending order, these ranks are: (A) apprentice; (Z) zenza; (F) futatsume; (S) shin'uchi)

Kashiwaya 柏家
Miroku (IV) 三禄
~~Kiroku~~ (Note: Later expelled from Kashiwaya school; founds Arakawa School as Shiguma Arakawa (V)) 生禄	Miroku (V) 三禄
Rokuro (Note: Promoted during timeskip) 禄郎
~~Kisoba~~ (Z) (Note: Follows Master Kiroku to Arakawa School, becomes Issho Arakawa) 生そば	~~Rokuen~~ (Z) (Note: Follows Master Kiroku to Arakawa School, becomes Shiguma Arakawa (VI)) 禄ゑん

Sanmeitei 三明亭
Enso (VI) 円相	~~Ensha~~ (Note: Later become Sharaku of Ransaika school) 円しゃ
Karashi (F) からし

Ransaika 蘭彩歌
Sharaku しゃ楽
Urara うらら
Mayura (F) まゆら

Konjakutei 今昔亭
Chocho ちょう朝
Asagao (F) 朝がお

Tsubakiya 樁家
Shomei (IX) 正明	Hassho 八正

Kenputei 暄風亭
Ryu'un 流雲
Un'un (Z) 雲うん

==== Kashiwaya ====
Miroku Kashiwaya (柏家 三禄, Kashiwaya Miroku) (V)
Voiced by: Hōchū Ōtsuka (Japanese); SungWon Cho (English)
Master Miroku Kashiwaya (V), aka "The National Treasure", was a zenza alongside Urara, Shiguma, and Issho. He is the fifth to take the name "Miroku"; these myoseki stage names are established by legendary rakugoka and passed down within a school.
Rokuro Kashiwaya (柏家 禄郎, Kashiwaya Rokurō)
Rokuro Kashiwaya, aka "The Wonder Child", believes the sound of rakugo is paramount and styles his performances after musicians, including John Coltrane; on "Coltrane days", the story begins in a gentle manner and ends aggressively. He defended Akane from unfair criticism by Rien Konjakuan and warned that her revenge strategy would have repercussions. He got promoted to shin'uchi during the timeskip.

==== Sanmeitei ====
Karashi Sanmeitei (三明亭 からし, Sanmeitei Karashi)
Voiced by: Takuya Eguchi (Japanese); Kellen Goff (English)
Karashi competed with Akane and Hikaru in the Karaku Cup as Karashi Nerimaya; specializes in "adapted rakugo", which takes a classic story and adds modern elements. While somewhat smug and prickly, Karashi very intelligent, observant, and talented in everything he does, including being a two-time champion of the Karaka Cup. He is a zenza studying under master Enso Sanmeitei (三明亭円相, Sanmeitei Enso), and was promoted to futatsume during the timeskip.

==== Ransaika ====
Urara Ransaika (蘭彩歌 うらら, Ransaika Urara)
Voiced by: Mutsumi Tamura (Japanese); Kari Wahlgren (English)
Master Urara Ransaika is an ookanban, a superstar capable of filling a venue on the basis of her name alone. Urara is the sole apprentice of Sharaku Ransaika (蘭彩歌しゃ楽, Ransaika Sharaku) "The Unteaching", who believed no one could properly inherit his art until he met her. Sharaku performed kuruwa-banashi, rakugo set in brothels, which emphasized the importance of dialogue and conversation, and Urara's seductive manner is capable of immersing the audience fully into those settings. Has known Issho/Kisoba, Shiguma (V)/Kiroku, and Shiguma (VI)/Rokuen since 1964, when they met after she was accosted by the son of a yakuza kumichō (family head).

==== Konjakutei ====
Chocho Konjakutei (今昔亭 ちょう朝, Konjakutei Chōchō)
Voiced by: Tomokazu Seki (Japanese); Ben Diskin (English)
Master Chocho Konjakutei was the youngest to ever be considered an ookanban headliner. He is an inveterate gambler, choosing the story he will perform just before taking the stage, based on a roll of the dice. Before becoming a shin'uchi, he participated in futatsume events with his friends Shinta Arakawa and Taizen Arakawa.
Asagao Konjakutei (今昔亭 朝がお, Konjakutei Asagao)
Voiced by: Taku Yashiro
Asagao was the senior (tate) zenza at the Yasaka-tei theatre when Akane arrived for her initial training. At that time he was a zenza known to have a hot temper, which cost him a chance for a futatsume promotion after he punched Rien Konjakuan for insulting his master. Later, he is promoted to futatsume at a debut with Akane, Taizen, and Chocho.

==== Tsubakiya ====
Hassho Tsubakiya (樁家 八正, Tsubakiya Hasshō)
Voiced by: Yōji Ueda
Master Hassho Tsubakiya prefers his cushion to be precisely 80 cm (31 in) from the microphone and performs in a gentle manner. He takes great pride in the craft of rakugo and does not wish to see the art cheapened by revenge stunts.
Shomei Tsubakiya (樁家 正明, Tsubakiya Shōmei) (IX)
Voiced by: Ryōtarō Okiayu (Japanese); Crispin Freeman (English)
Shomei Tsubakiya is a rare ookanban whose myoseki name is hereditary, passed on from father to son. The current Shomei is the ninth of the line, and the son of the eighth Shomei Tsubakiya—also known as "The Stain of Tsubakiya". Shomei (IX) is a vice-chair of the Rakugo Federation.

==== Konjakuan ====
Rien Konjakuan (今昔庵 りゑん, Konjuakuan Rien)
Rien Konjakuan is an inconsiderate futatsume nicknamed "the rookie-crusher" for making unreasonable demands of zenza. He has held a grudge against Akane for years after she ridiculed him during one of her first performances.

=== Other rakugo-related people ===
Gakumon Saito (斎藤 学問, Saitō Gakumon)
Gakumon-sensei is a traditional art critic who served as a judge for the zenza renseikai event held by the Arakawa school. His granddaughter (daughter of his daughter), Emilie Dupont, lives in Paris and helped Akane when she was sent to Europe for training by Issho.
Kimihisa Kashio (樫尾 公久, Kashio Kimihisa)
Voiced by: Ryota Iwasaki (Japanese); Clifford Chapin (English)
Kimihisa is a writer for Monthly Rakugo, a magazine covering the events of rakugo.
Saki Yoshino (吉乃 紗季, Yoshino Saki)
Voiced by: Yumiko Konatsu (Japanese); Mona Marshall (English)
Akiko Ganari
Akiko is a longtime patron and fan of the Arakawa School. At the Isshokai, she reveals the source of the rift between Issho and Shiguma (VI).

== Production ==
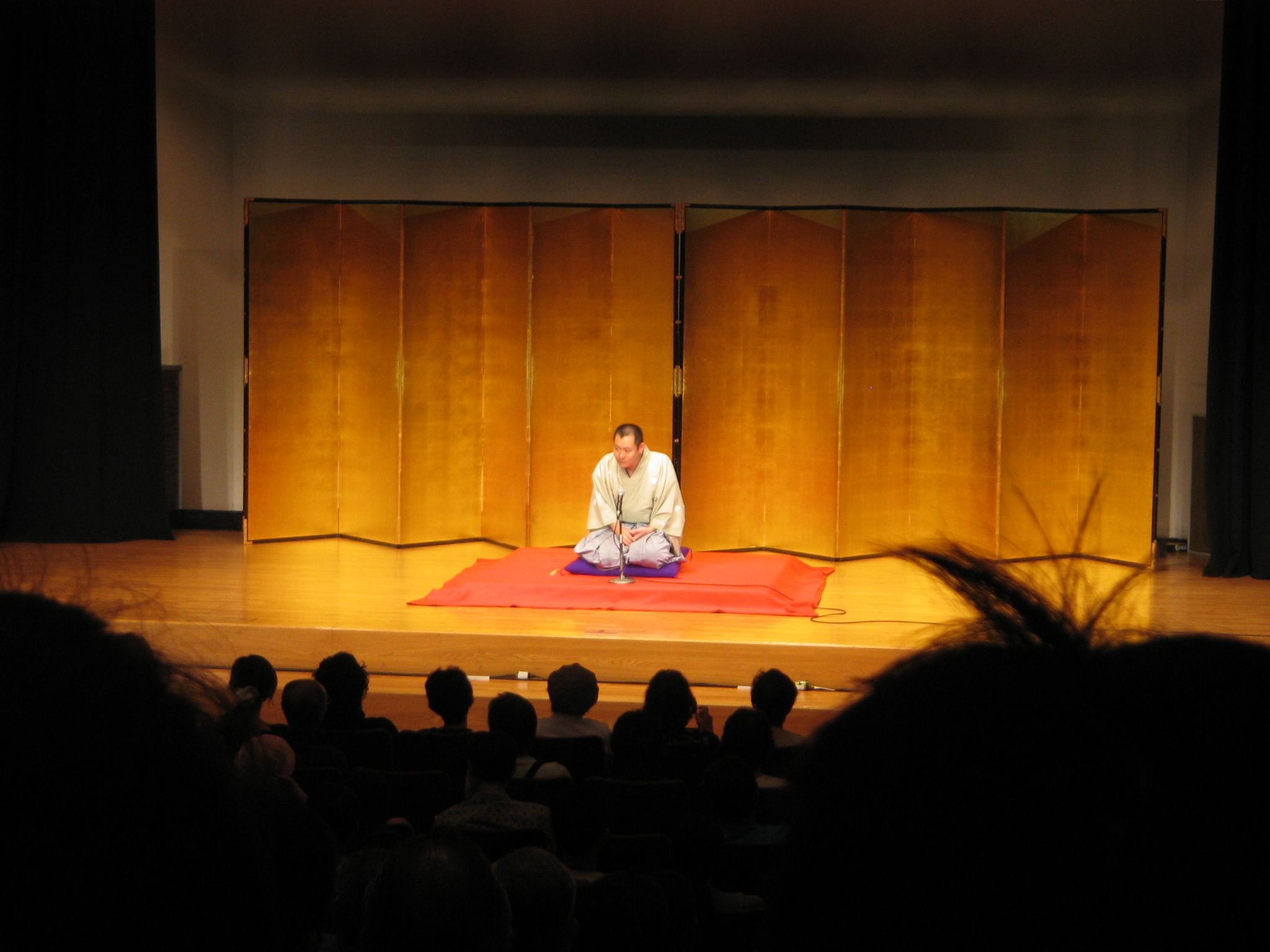
A rakugo performance

When author Yuki Suenaga submitted a story about high school comedians to his editor Murakoshi at Weekly Shōnen Jump, Murakoshi chose artist Takamasa Moue to illustrate because the manga needed a rare combination of realistically-drawn characters and comical facial expressions. The one-shot, Tatarashido, was published in Weekly Shōnen Jump issue 27 of 2021. Because it was quite popular, Suenaga and Murakoshi discussed turning it into a serial. But after several storyboards were rejected, they realized a series about comedians was extremely difficult and Suenaga suggested rakugo instead. Suenaga stated that Akane-banashi originated with Akane, a character he created but did not know what to do with. She had been created for an abandoned manga proposal about ballet, before he suggested using her for the new manga. A fan of manzai and conte, Suenaga was interested in rakugo, but felt it was too difficult to get into. Suspecting there were many people who felt the same way, and that it would be unexpected of the character, he decided to have Akane perform rakugo. Suenaga stated that because he is new to rakugo, he is able to predict the things readers might not know, and can depict them in the manga in a way they will understand. The serialization of Akane-banashi was proposed in Q4 2021. The rakugo in the manga is supervised by professional rakugoka Kikuhiko Hayashiya. (Note: Hayashiya is credited as "Keiki Hayashiya" until chapter 150, published on March 17, 2025. That month, he was promoted to shin'uchi and changed his stage name to "Kikuhiko Hayashiya".) Hayashiya had first worked for Shueisha by writing columns analyzing the rakugo seen in One Piece for One Piece Magazine after they had seen his tweets doing the same. Around the end of 2021, he was approached by the publisher about supervising a new rakugo manga. Thanks to help from Hayashiya, Suenaga interviewed more than 20 rakugoka, including Momoka Chokaroh and Miyaji Katsura.

After creating a name or rough draft, Suenaga has Hayashiya check it for accuracy, including mannerisms and dialogue, before Moue begins drawing. In addition to consulting his rakugoka colleagues, Suenaga said Hayashiya also has a deep understanding of the manga medium and often makes suggestions. Moue said when he first heard about the series he found it interesting, but worried whether readers of Weekly Shōnen Jump would be interested in rakugo. Realizing it was his job to make them interested, he said he tried to get readers emotionally invested in the characters, and to broaden the scope to appeal to those unfamiliar with rakugo. Having previously only had a passing interest in rakugo, Moue said he had fun researching it for Akane-banashi. To draw the rakugo scenes in the manga, Moue listens to a performance of the relevant story and thinks about how to convey the speed and intonation. According to Araki, the manga's second editor, Moue does much on-location research to draw things as realistically accurate as possible.

Suenaga, Moue and Hayashiya have meetings together with the manga's editor once every few months. Although they ensure Suenaga's storylines are plausible in the world of rakugo, the team aims to strike a balance between elements that are grounded in reality and those that are purely fictional. For example, although Kaisei's colorful kimonos and Issho's beard would be frowned upon in real life, in manga, characters need a signature look or visual icon. The author stated that he tries to never lose sight of the fact that the work is, first and foremost, a shōnen manga with rakugo simply "layered on top".

Gendai Business columnist Kenichiro Horii wrote that Akane-banashi's Arakawa School is clearly modeled after the real-life Tatekawa School of rakugo, whose master, Danshi Tatekawa VII, expelled a group of zenza in 2002, after feeling that they were not showing enough effort to reach futatsume. Although Kazuhiro Ito of Good Life with Books also noted the similarities, he reported that Suenaga stated Issho was instead modeled after Enshō Sanyūtei VI. Horii also pointed out that the Rakugo Cafe seen in the series is modeled after a real café with a similar name in Jinbōchō, Tokyo. According to Hayashiya, the Yasaka-tei and Edobashi-tei theaters in the manga were modeled after the Suehiro-tei in Shinjuku and the Oedo Nihonbashi-tei in Nihonbashi, respectively. For the colored title page of chapter 29, Moue was inspired by The Breakfast Club. The Shikisai Festival seen in the manga was modeled after the Rakugo Association's Sharakusai Festival.

Akane-banashi features real-life rakugo stories. When deciding which ones to include, Suenaga said he typically starts with a specific emotion that he wishes to convey, and then searches for the story that best aligns with that emotion. However, there are also times when he finds himself with a desire to see a specific character perform a specific story. Kyoji's performance of "Three Men Lose One Ryo" being one such example. The author said that, while he wants it to be clear what the stories are about, he also strives to avoid letting them become nothing more than exposition. To this end, he uses various creative devices to evoke the sensation of actually listening to a rakugo performance—for example, juxtaposition is created by using a different art style for the characters from the story than that of the manga's original characters. The story "Giboshi" that is depicted in chapter 87 is a little-known rakugo story that was revived by Kyotaro Yanagiya. Suenaga stated that he received permission to use it in Akane-banashi. "Monkey See, Monkey Do" is an original rakugo story and performance that Suenaga, Moue and Hayashiya created specifically for the manga.

== Media ==
=== Manga ===
Written by Yuki Suenaga and illustrated by Takamasa Moue, Akane-banashi began serialization in Shueisha's shōnen manga magazine Weekly Shōnen Jump on February 14, 2022. The rakugo in the series is supervised by professional rakugoka Kikuhiko Hayashiya. Publisher Shueisha is collecting the individual chapters into tankōbon volumes, with the first released on June 3, 2022. As of October 2, 2026, 24 volumes have been released.

Both Shueisha and Viz Media began releasing the series in English digitally the same day it began in Japan, the former on its Manga Plus website and application. Viz began publishing Akane-banashi in print on August 8, 2023.

=== Anime ===
An anime television series adaptation was announced on August 4, 2025. It is produced by Zexcs and directed by Ayumu Watanabe, with series composition by Michihiro Tsuchiya, characters designed by Kii Tanaka, who also served as chief animation director, and music composed by Akio Izutsu. The opening theme song is "Hitotarashi", while the ending theme song is, "Akane on My Mind: Manjū Kowai", both written and performed by Keisuke Kuwata. The series aired from April 4 to June 20, 2026, on the IMAnimation programming block on TV Asahi and its affiliates.

Before the television airing, the Japan Society hosted the world premiere of the anime's first episode in New York on April 1 of the same year. In North America and Latin America, the anime is streaming on YouTube, (Note: Via the "Akane-banashi Global" YouTube channel.) and also on Netflix worldwide. An English dub, produced by Bang Zoom!, premiered on Netflix on May 17, 2026. Medialink licensed the series in South-East Asia for streaming on Ani-One Asia's YouTube channel.

A second season was announced after the finale of the first season, and is set to premiere in January 2027 on the same programming block.

==== Episodes ====
No.	Title	Directed by	Storyboarded by	Original release date
1	"On That Day"; Transliteration: "Ano Hi" (Japanese: あの日)	Yu Harima	Ayumu Watanabe	April 4, 2026
Akane Osaki, a fifth-grade student, explains her respect for her father, Tohru (stage name Shinta Arakawa), with an improvised rakugo performance in front of a classmate and his parents after she lashed out against the classmate in retaliation for looking down on her father. Tohru arrives to calm Akane down before the situation got out of hand. Afterwards, Tohru tells Akane that he will become a shin'uchi, the highest ranking for rakugoka, to take care of the family's struggling financial status. On the day of the shun'uchi promotion test, Issho Arakawa, the headmaster of the Arakawa School, arrives to be the judge for the test. Tohru performs, and under immense pressure he initially struggles as he forgets a crucial part of the story, but still captivates the audience with his improvisation. After the test, Issho announces that Tohru and the rakugoka who took the test is expelled. Six years later, Akane, now a high school student, is determined to become a rakugoka in order to revive her father's legacy.
2	"First Performance"; Transliteration: "Hatsu Kōza" (Japanese: 初高座)	Tsuyoshi Yamane	Yu Harima	April 11, 2026
Guriko Arakawa, a futatsume (second-highest rank) rakugoka under the apprenticeship of Tohru's former master, Shiguma Arakawa VI, tails Shiguma to a karaoke parlor where he learns that he had been secretly training Akane for the past six years. Following his expulsion, Tohru has since become a salesman for a company that sells concrete and earns a stable income from it, but Akane misses his rakugo so much that she dedicated herself to replicating his style of rakugo. Afterwards, Akane is asked to fill in for a late-arriving rakugoka at the Rakugo Cafe that Tohru used to perform regularly at. Akane puts on her first live performance as a rakugoka with her story Scared of Manju, receiving rave reviews from the audience. After the performance, the originally-scheduled rakugoka, Kaisei Arakawa, a rising star who was promoted to futatsume at age 19 and Issho's apprentice, performs and Akane realizes the gap in talent. Kaisei asks Akane to become Issho's apprentice, but refuses and decides she will only learn under Shiguma and runs out of the cafe.
3	"Senior Apprentices"; Transliteration: "Anideshi" (Japanese: 兄弟子)	Kenta Mimuro	Kenta Mimuro	April 19, 2026 (Note: This episode aired at 12:00 a.m. JST, 30 minutes after the original air time on TV Asahi.)
Akane Osaki performs publicly for the first time, inspired by Kaisei Arakawa's Rakugo performance, and is officially accepted as Shiguma's apprentice. Shiguma introduces her to the senior apprentices, and the highly disciplined Kyoji Arakawa becomes her mentor. Surprisingly, Kyoji sends her to work at the Umi izakaya hoping she will learn attentiveness and how to meet a client's needs. A week later, happy with her progress, Kyoji invites her to accompany him on a business trip.
4	"Beyond Joy"; Transliteration: "Yorokobi no Saki" (Japanese: 喜びの先)	Yūsuke Nakagama	Seishirō Nagaya	April 25, 2026
Kyoji takes Akane with him to a job at a retirement home, where a Rakugo performance seen as a special occasion. Akane puts into practice what she learned at the izakaya, building rapport with the audience and presenting a story that would entertain them, and in a way that kept them engaged. Kyoji then follows her, presenting his story in a completely different style, maintaining a serious demeanor while simultaneously making the audience laugh. Following the performance, Kyoji asks Akane to call him "Kyoji Ani-san", but then angrily reprimands her when he learns she has been neglecting her schoolwork.
5	"Her Path Forward"; Transliteration: "Susumu Michi" (Japanese: 進む道)	Miwa Sasaki	Miwa Sasaki	May 2, 2026
Following the midterm exams, Akane has a career counseling session with her homeroom teacher, Ms. Iwashimizu, referred to by the students as the "Ice Lady". She pressures Akane to complete her career survey form and tries to discourage her from becoming a Rakugoka even as Akane invites her to a Rakugo performance. Akane's friend, Jumbo Ozaki later encourages the teacher to attend, and she does. Ms. Iwashimizu is pleasantly surprised by Akane's performance and dedication, and later shows her a flyer for a student Rakugo competition. Iwashimizu suggests that she enter, mentioning that one of the judges will be Issho Arakawa, the current patriarch of the Arakawa school.
6	"Terakoya" (Japanese: 寺子屋)	Hayato Sakai	Hiroyuki Morita	May 9, 2026
The 20th Student Rakugo Competition, the Karaku Cup, is announced. Host and chief judge, Issho Arakawa, has requested that school students be invited as well, so he can see the talent of younger practitioners. Master Shiguma Arikawa agrees that Akane can enter, but only if she performs "Jugemu", a story about a child with a very long name. Guriko Arakawa takes her to meet Koguma Ani-san, the Shiguma School's 'Terakoya', or grassroots teacher. After first refusing to help, Koguma watches her perform and then gives her some advice. Later, she attends his performance of "Foxes of Imado" which impresses her, and prompts her to do more research into Rakugo.
7	"Karaku Cup"; Transliteration: "Karaku Hai" (Japanese: 可楽杯)	Ryōko Nakano	Ryōko Nakano	May 16, 2026
8	"What They Want"; Transliteration: "Nīzu" (Japanese: ニーズ)	Shizue Kaneko & Yu Harima	Shizue Kaneko	May 23, 2026
9	"Performer"; Transliteration: "Hyōgensha" (Japanese: 表現者)	Mie Ōishi	Mie Ōishi	May 30, 2026
10	"Jugemu" (Japanese: 寿限無)	Wang Chihsia	Wang Chihsia	June 6, 2026
11	"Answer"; Transliteration: "Kotae" (Japanese: 答え)	Fujino Sora	Hideaki Uehara	June 13, 2026
12	"Graduation"; Transliteration: "Sotsugyō" (Japanese: 卒業)	Miwa Sasaki & Yu Harima	Miwa Sasaki	June 20, 2026

=== Other media ===
The first chapter of Akane-banashi received a motion comic adaptation, where voice actors, music and sound effects are heard as the manga images appear on screen. It was uploaded to Jump Comics' official YouTube channel in two parts on June 4 and 5, 2022. Akane and her father are voiced by Akane and Kappei Yamaguchi. In addition to being actual daughter and father, the Yamaguchis are also both rakugoka.

Several rakugo events related to Akane-banashi have been held. The Akane-banashi no Kai (あかね噺の会) was first held at Uchisaiwai Hall on February 5, 2023, to commemorate the first anniversary of the manga's serialization. The second installment took place at the same venue on June 2, 2024, while the third was held at Kandamyoujin Hall on November 30, 2025. The Akane-banashi Rakugo Kai: Tousei Okamban Hyakugei Ryoran was held at Yurakucho Yomiuri Hall on May 7 and 8, 2026.

== Reception ==
=== Sales and accolades ===
By September 2022, the collected volumes of Akane-banashi had over 200,000 copies in circulation and volume one had been reprinted four times. With the release of volume 13 in September 2024, the manga had 2 million copies in circulation; with the release of volume 20 in January 2026, the manga had over 3 million copies in circulation. The series was nominated for the 2022 Next Manga Award in the print manga category and ranked third out of 50 nominees. The series ranked fourth in the 2023 edition of Takarajimasha's Kono Manga ga Sugoi! list of best manga for male readers. It ranked third in the Nationwide Bookstore Employees Recommended Comics of 2023. Akane-banashi ranked second in the 16th Manga Taishō, losing to Draw This, Then Die! by two points. It was also nominated for the 47th Kodansha Manga Award in the shōnen category in 2023. The New York Public Library included Akane-banashi on its 2023 list of the Best Books for Teens. Anime News Network's Richard Eisenbeis chose it as the Best New Manga of 2023, while Brigid Alverson of School Library Journal included it as one of the Top 10 Manga of 2023. The Young Adult Library Services Association included the first volume of Akane-banashi on its 2024 list of Great Graphic Novels for Teens. In 2024, Stephen Paul's English translation of the series for Viz Media was nominated for Best Translation at the inaugural American Manga Awards, which is co-organized by Anime NYC and Japan Society.

=== Critical response ===
Steven Blackburn of Screen Rant praised the first chapter of Akane-banashi. He wrote that the sudden shift in protagonists from Shinta, "a stereotypical hero who embodies everything that makes a successful shonen [manga]", to Akane, an unconventional hero who is essentially a wunderkind, already makes the latter character compelling. "That's a difficult dynamic to achieve, but Akane-banashi has somehow succeeded before it's even begun". In a review for Multiversity Comics, Zach Wilkerson gave the "immensely charming and well crafted" first chapter an 8.5 rating, with particular praise for Moue's art. Robbie Pleasant of the same website strongly praised the series and its art for successfully conveying how a performer's demeanor and voice changes as they perform different characters, despite manga being a static and soundless medium. The series has been recommended by Eiichiro Oda and Hideaki Anno.

In May 2022, Kota Mukaihara of Real Sound wrote that Akane-banashi was poised to be a breakout hit. He felt that although Akane's progress in rakugo seemed to be going unusually fast and smooth, with her not yet being confronted by a tough challenge or failing at something, this allows readers to follow her growth without unnecessary stress. Mukaihara speculated that, while this could simply be because the manga was still new and needed to develop quickly in order to gain momentum, it emphasizes Akane's cleverness and the depth of her determination and is a testament to the charm of the characters and the skill with which the story is written. He also wrote that while Akane's outgoing personality and unprecedented skill make her seem like a maverick, her positivity and down-to-earth nature make her a likable character. Blackburn's colleague Ben Sockol praised later chapters of the series for "subverting the classic tournament arc trope", writing that Akane-banashi feels fresh and different from anything else in Weekly Shōnen Jump and is one of the most exciting manga currently running in the magazine as of June 2022.
