= The Lost Boy (memoir) =

1997 memoir by Dave Pelzer

- Author: David Pelzer
- Language: English
- Publisher: Health Communications, Inc.
- Publication date: 1997
- Publication place: United States
- Preceded by: A Child Called "It"
- Followed by: A Man Named Dave

The Lost Boy (1997) is the second installment of a trilogy of books about the life of David Pelzer, who as a young boy was physically, emotionally, mentally, and psychologically abused by his mother and alcoholic father. A sequel to the Pulitzer Prize-nominated A Child Called It, in 2002 The New York Times Magazine reported that The Lost Boy had spent 160 weeks on its bestseller list for non-fiction paperbacks.

The book discusses Pelzer's defiant, rebellious behavior as he struggles to adapt to foster care, living in five different foster homes and in juvenile detention. It also talks about the kindness of his foster parents and other people around him, as well as his inability to brush his mother aside.

The Lost Boy is included as the second book in Dave Pelzer's compilation My Story.

== Reception ==
A 1997 review in Library Journal recommending The Lost Boy said that Pelzer's "honest, sometimes rambling" account was "never bitter" and sure to "find many sympathetic readers". A 2002 article in The New York Times Magazine suggested that Pelzer had "devoted significant space in The Lost Boy to rehashing abuse incidents from his earlier book" because his experiences in foster homes were "dull in comparison".

== Plot ==
The book continues after the ending of the previous book, A Child Called "It" with David Pelzer, 9 years old, running away from his home in Daly City, California. He ends up in a bar, getting caught by a staff member named Mark for stealing a quarter. Mark calls the police while tricking David to stay by baiting him with a pizza. The police brings David to the police station while sharing a pizza Mark gave David before he left. David's father arrives to bring David home to his abusive mother, telling the police that David is just upset for not being allowed to ride his bicycle. David's teachers eventually contact the authorities, causing David to be placed with a social services worker named Ms. Gold. Before the trial of whether or not to permanently remove him from his mother's custody, David becomes confused about whether he may have deserved the treatment his mother gave him. Ms. Gold, on the other hand, assures him it had nothing to do with him, and that his mother is sick. David eventually tells the truth about his mother, and becomes a permanent ward of the court, escaping from the abuse of his mother.

After the trial, he is put into a home under the care of a woman he calls Aunt Mary. He is admired by the other foster children for being able to steal, and he is active and disruptive in this new setting. When his mother and brothers visit, she swears to David that she will get him back. Later, David meets his first 'permanent' foster parents---Lilian and Rudy Catanze. Following another visit from his mother, and the return of his broken bike, David is distraught. He decides to earn money to fix the bicycle by doing chores. Afterwards, he rides the repaired bicycle down the road where his old home is. His family sees him riding on the road, and contacts his foster family.

Later in the book, a person who he thinks is his friend starts using him to do illegal things. One of those times is when they plan to set a teacher's classroom on fire. The fire gets out of control, though David tries to stop it. His "friend" later tells the teacher that it was David. As a result, he is removed from his foster home, and sent to Juvenile Hall. He returns to the California foster care system upon his release.

In his sophomore year of high school, he is placed into a class for slow learners. He then decides that he is more interested in earning money than school because he will be out of foster care in less than a year. He also looks for his father, only to find out he lost his job at the fire station due to his alcoholism, but he gives David his fireman's badge as a proper goodbye present before he and David part ways. When he is out of foster care, he enlists in the US Air Force.

As he talked to his mother and began to cry, he then hopes that his mother will say the three special words that he has always wanted her to say, "I love you." She does not say it and he believes she is just playing with his emotions. He soon realizes that the mother's love that he has always been searching for was in the arms of his foster mother, Alice.

The story ends with him beginning his career in the Air Force so he can learn how to treat others. From then on, it continues to the book A Man Named Dave.
