= Eddy Clearwater =

American blues musician

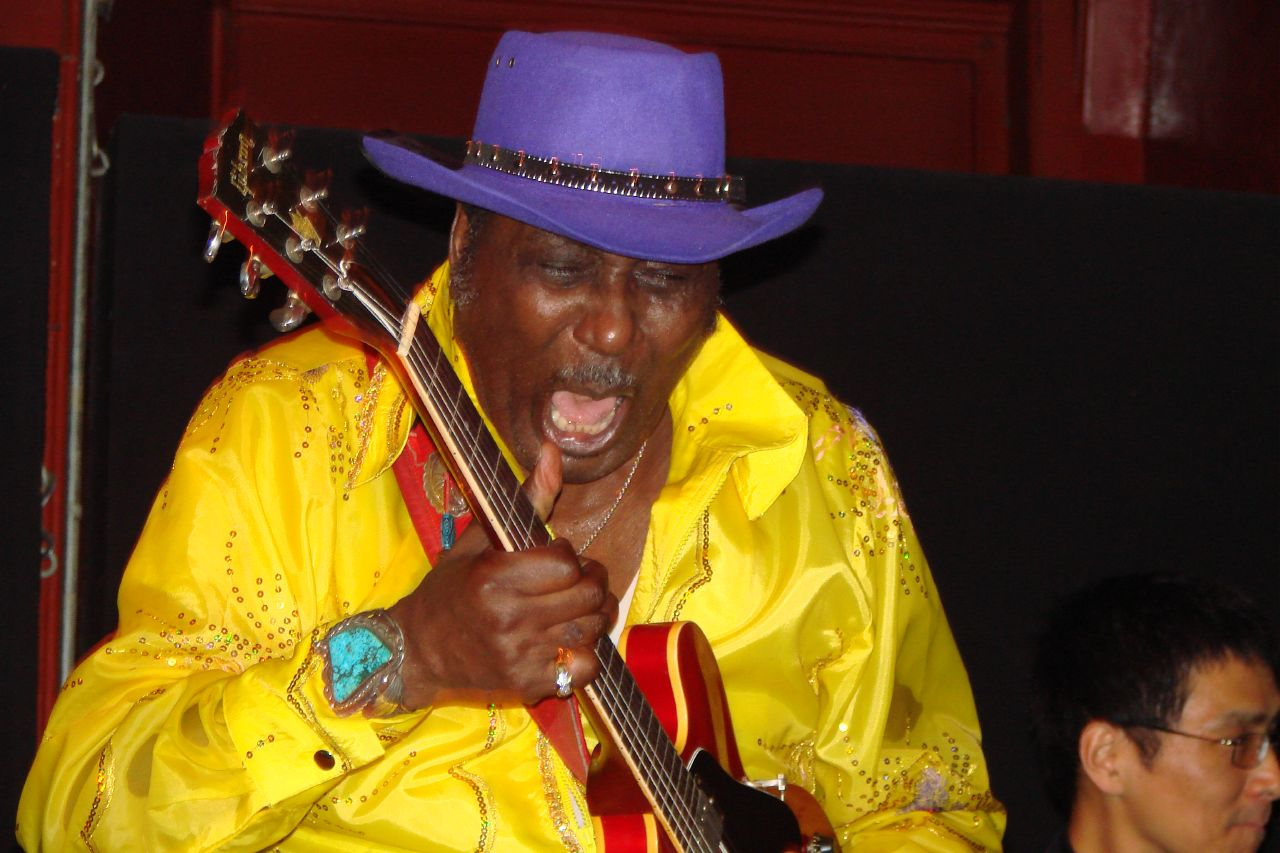
- Clearwater at the Iron Horse Music Hall, Northampton, Massachusetts, April 20, 2008

Background information
- Also known as: Guitar Eddy, Clear Waters, The Chief
- Born: Edward Harrington; January 10, 1935; Macon, Mississippi, U.S.
- Died: June 1, 2018 (aged 83) Skokie, Illinois, U.S.
- Genres: Chicago blues Electric blues
- Occupation(s): Musician, singer
- Instrument(s): Vocals, electric guitar
- Years active: 1953–2018
- Labels: Alligator, Blind Pig, Rounder, Delmark
- Website: eddyclearwater.com

Edward Harrington (January 10, 1935 – June 1, 2018), better known by his stage name Eddy Clearwater, was an American blues musician who specialized in Chicago blues. Blues Revue said he plays "joyous rave-ups…he testifies with stunning soul fervor and powerful guitar. One of the blues' finest songwriters."

== Early life ==
Edward Harrington was born in Macon, Mississippi, on January 10, 1935. He was raised by his part-Cherokee grandmother in Mississippi. His family moved to Birmingham, Alabama, in 1948. He was a cousin of the blues harmonica player Carey Bell.

He began playing guitar at age 13, teaching himself left-handed and upside down. He began performing with gospel groups, including the Five Blind Boys of Alabama.

He moved to Chicago in 1950, playing predominantly gospel, and later developed his blues artistry after working with Magic Sam, Otis Rush, and others.

== Career ==
Clearwater is best known for his activity in the Chicago blues scene since the 1950s. He performed in the US (especially around the Chicago area, where he resides) and internationally, having played at blues festivals in France, Germany, Denmark, Sweden, Poland, Turkey and the Netherlands. His sound has been described as "hard-driving Windy City blues, soul-tinged balladry, acoustic country blues and gospel uplift….good natured fretboard fireworks."

When he left the South for Chicago in 1950, he worked as a dishwasher while living with an uncle, through whom he met many of Chicago's blues masters, including Otis Rush (who also was a left-handed playing the guitar upside down) and Magic Sam. Inspired by the music of Chuck Berry, he began performing some of Berry's songs and writing in a style influenced by him. Clearwater regularly performed songs by Rush, Magic Sam, and Berry, as well as original compositions. In 1953, then known as Guitar Eddy, he began working regularly in bars on Chicago's South and West Sides. His first single, the Berry-styled "Hill Billy Blues", was recorded in 1958 for his uncle's Atomic H label, under the moniker Clear Waters, a name given to him by his booking agent, drummer Armand "Jump" Jackson, as a play on the name of the famous Muddy Waters.

He recorded a few more singles, which had some local radio airplay. Eventually the name Clear Waters evolved into Eddy Clearwater. He worked steadily throughout the 1960s and 1970s and was among the first blues musicians to find success with Chicago's North Side college audiences. He was a regular Saturday act on the north stage of the blues club Kingston Mines, while bluesman Linsey Alexander played on the south stage. He toured Europe twice during the 1970s and appeared on BBC Television. Clearwater acquired the nickname The Chief and often performed wearing a Native American headdress.

The release of his 1980 album, The Chief, on the Rooster Blues label, made him known on the Chicago blues scene. Two encores for Rooster Blues, Help Yourself (1992) and Mean Case of the Blues (1996), cemented Clearwater's reputation. His album Cool Blues Walk was released in 1998, followed by Chicago Daily Blues in 1989 and Reservation Blues in mid-2000. In 2004, he was nominated for a Grammy Award with Los Straitjackets for their collaborative album Rock 'n' Roll City.

His album West Side Strut, released by Alligator Records in 2008, was described by Vintage Guitar magazine as "great blues. Eddy's tone shows a masterful command of the guitar. It's hard to believe he can reach such heights in a recording studio. One listen and you'll wonder why Clearwater's name isn't respectfully spoken in the same breath as Freddie King and Otis Rush."

== Personal life ==
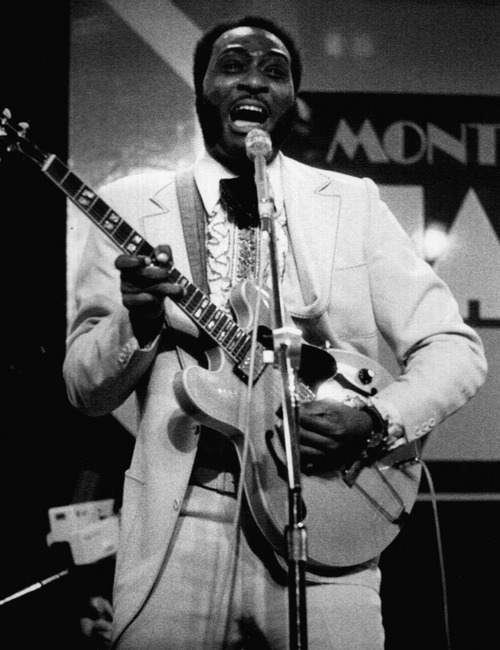
Clearwater in 1978

Clearwater was first married to Earlean Harrington of Chicago and was the stepfather of her son Daryl Thompson.

Clearwater was later married to his manager, Renee Greenman. They owned Reservation Blues, a Wicker Park (Chicago) blues bar and restaurant, in the early 2000s (and no longer in operation). It featured Clearwater regularly as well as local and national blues talent.

He fathered two sons, Jason and Edgar.

On January 8, 1997, Clearwater underwent successful triple heart bypass surgery.

Clearwater's hometown for the last few decades of his life was Skokie, Illinois, a northern suburb of Chicago. Skokie's mayor declared January 6 as Eddy "The Chief" Clearwater Day.

Clearwater died at his home in Skokie on June 1, 2018, of heart failure at the age of 83.

== Discography ==
- Black Night (1979)
- The Chief (1980)
- Two Times Nine (1981)
- Flimdoozie (1986)
- Blues Hang Out (1989)
- Real Good Time: Live!, live (1990)
- Help Yourself (1992)
- Live at The Kingston Mines, 1978, live (1992)
- Boogie My Blues Away (1995)
- Mean Case of the Blues (1996)
- Cool Blues Walk (1998)
- Chicago Blues Session, vol. 23, live (1998)
- Chicago Daily Blues (1999)
- Reservation Blues (2000)
- Rock 'n' Roll City, with Los Straitjackets (2003)
- West Side Strut (Alligator Records, 2008)
- Soul Funky, with Ronnie Baker Brooks and Billy Branch (Cleartone, 2014)

== See also ==
- Chicago Blues Festival
- List of Chicago blues musicians
- List of electric blues musicians
- San Francisco Blues Festival
