= Itta Bena, Mississippi =

- City
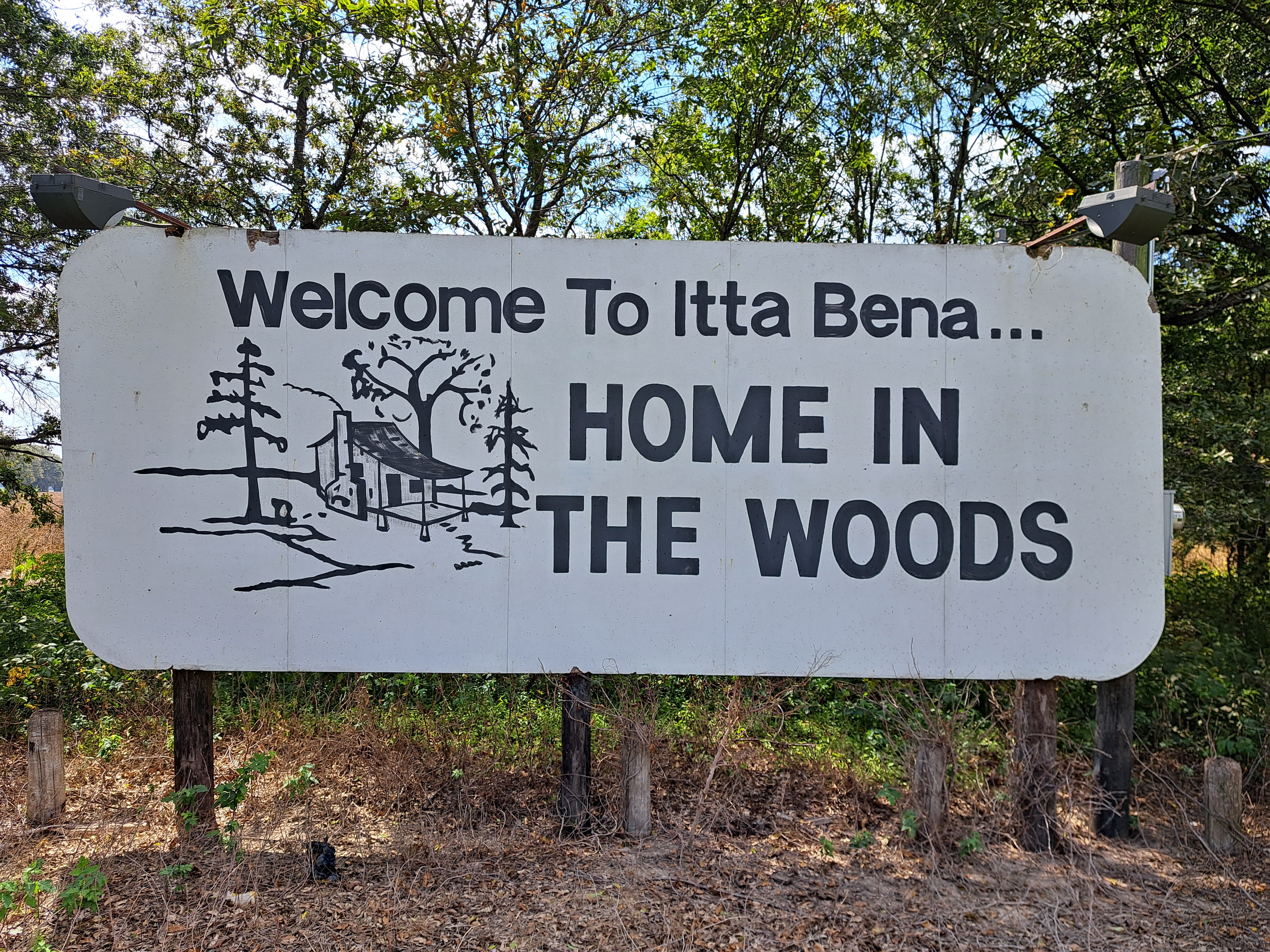
- Home in the Woods

- Location of Itta Bena, Mississippi

- Location in the United States
- Coordinates: 33°29′51″N 90°19′28″W
- Country: United States
- State: Mississippi
- County: Leflore

Government
  - Mayor: Mary Tyes-Williams

Area
  - Total: 1.46 sq mi (3.77 km^{2})
  - Land: 1.41 sq mi (3.65 km^{2})
  - Water: 0.046 sq mi (0.12 km^{2})
- Elevation: 125 ft (38 m)

Population (2020)
  - Total: 1,679
  - Density: 1,190.0/sq mi (459.48/km^{2})
- Time zone: UTC−6 (Central (CST))
  - Summer (DST): UTC−5 (CDT)
- ZIP code: 38941
- Area code: 662
- FIPS code: 28-35260
- GNIS feature ID: 2404772
- Website: www.cityofittabena.gov

Itta Bena is a city in Leflore County, Mississippi, United States. As of the 2020 census, Itta Bena had a population of 1,679. The town's name is derived from the Choctaw phrase iti bina, meaning "forest camp". Itta Bena is part of the Greenwood, Mississippi micropolitan area. It developed as a trading center of an area of cotton plantations.

== History ==
=== Early history ===
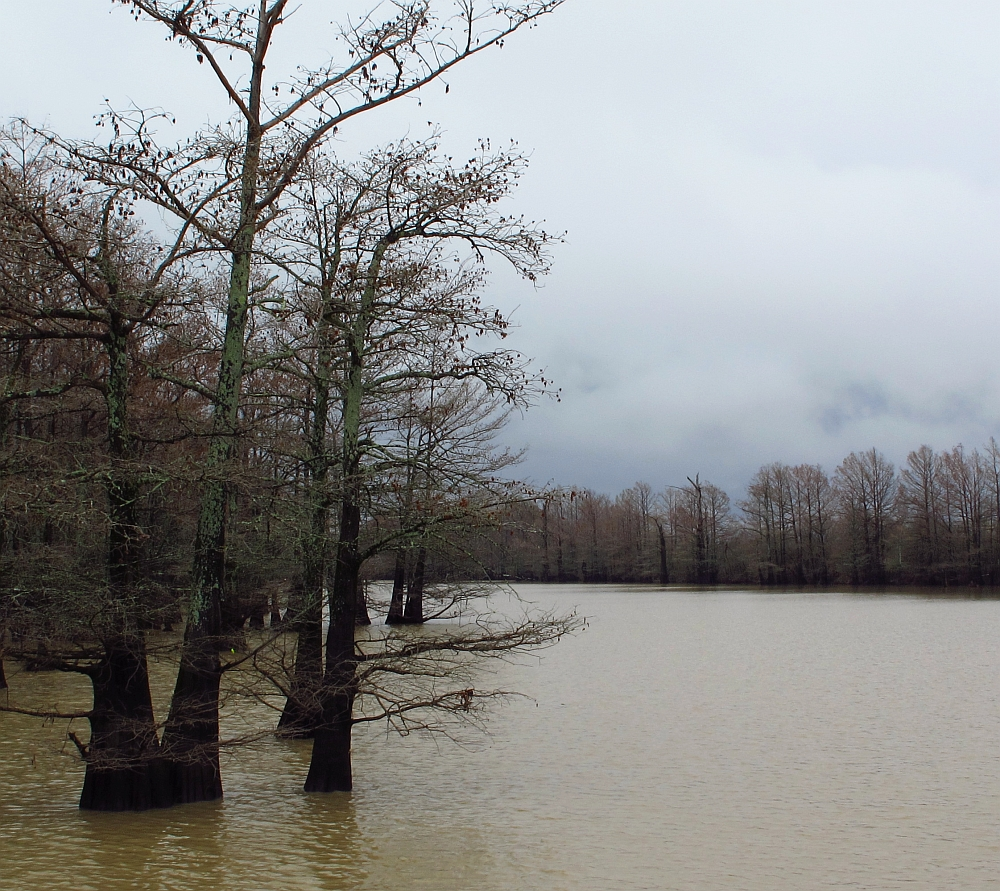
Roebuck Lake in Itta Bena

The indigenous Choctaw Indians occupied the Delta region for hundreds of years prior to the arrival of European settlers, with ancestors stretching thousands of years into the past. The first removal treaty carried out under the Indian Removal Act was the 1830 Treaty of Dancing Rabbit Creek, by which the Choctaw ceded about 11 million acres of the Choctaw Nation (now Mississippi) to the United States in exchange for about 15 million acres in Indian Territory (now Oklahoma).

Benjamin Grubb Humphreys, a state senator from Claiborne County, Mississippi, is credited with the founding of Itta Bena. Following several crop failures in the 1850s at his home in Claiborne County, Humphreys took a trip by river steamer up into the Yazoo wilderness to look for a new farming opportunity in the former Choctaw area.

He found such an opportunity on Roebuck Lake, a stretch of old channel that the river had discarded a few miles west of Greenwood, in what was then Sunflower County. Bringing a group of slaves up from his plantations during the winter, when boats could use high water to pass from the Yazoo into Roebuck, he directed them in clearing timber and brush from the overgrown bottomland to develop agricultural fields for cultivation of cotton. Longtime Claiborne County friends became interested in his project, and others began to acquire land in the area two years later.

Humphreys had established a permanent winter residence, "Lucknow", in Claiborne County. He did not bring his family to his Itta Bena plantation until slaves had completed construction of a substantial home in 1857, which he christened as Itta Bena, the Choctaw words for "camp in the woods". It was built from lumber from the land of the plantation, logs which were plastered and painted. The earliest substantial home built in the frontier Yazoo country, it was the center of the plantation’s many hundred acres. The main portion of the original Humphreys home was still used as a residence in 1954 (thought to be the home of Dr. B. B. Harper on Lakeshore Street). Following the Civil War, Humphreys was elected as governor of Mississippi.

As other settlers moved into the area, the village that grew up around the plantation was also called Itta Bena. Planters used the Yazoo River to ship cotton downriver, ultimately to New Orleans for transport to markets in the United States and Great Britain. Cotton continued as the commodity crop and the source of local wealth after the American Civil War.

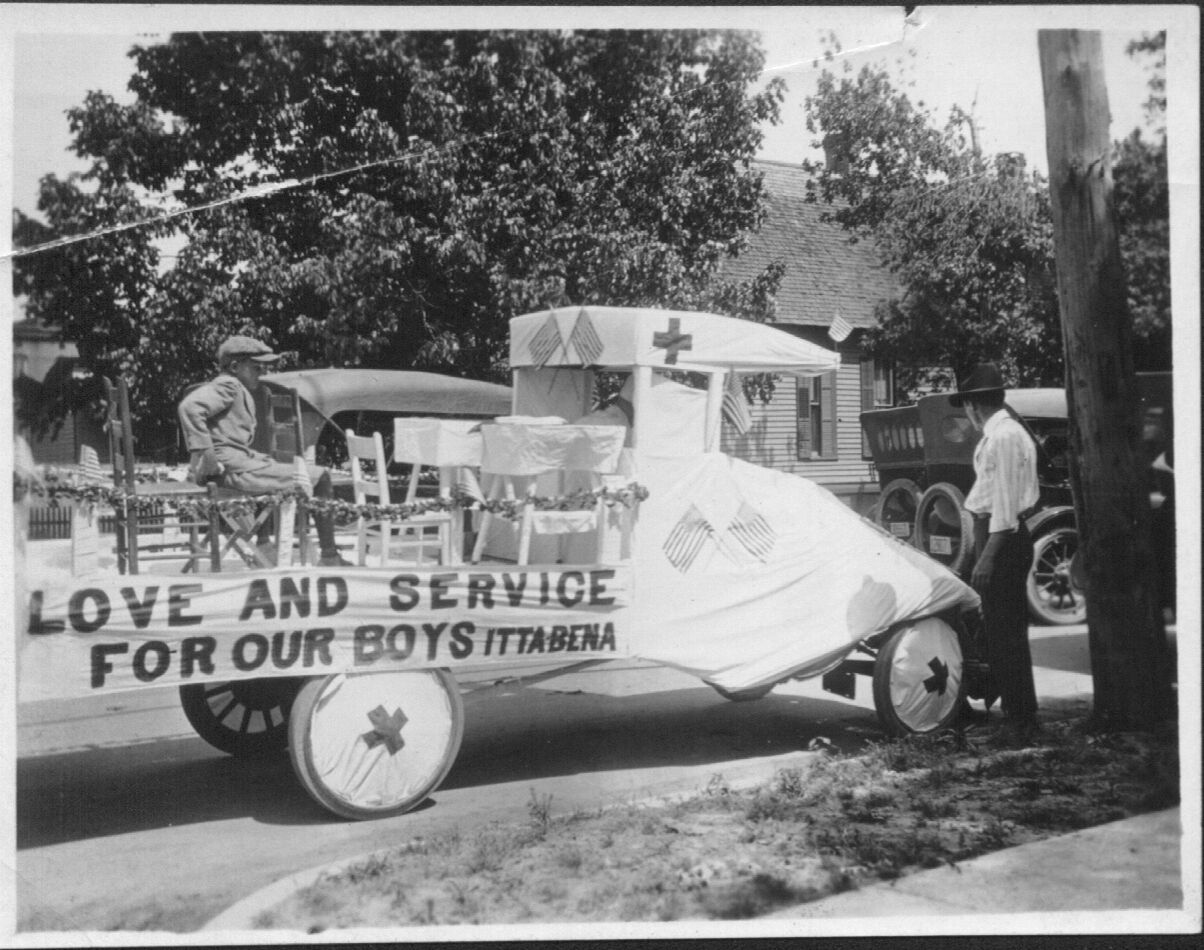
WW I parade float

Construction of the Columbus and Greenville Railway, begun in 1888 and serving the village, stimulated trade and growth. Among the first to build stores were J. B. Humphreys, P. Cohen, and Uriah Ray. The first store was operated by H. M. Weber and a man named Long. The town’s first school, a one-room building only for white students, was built in 1888 and Emma Cross served as the first teacher.

=== 20th century to present ===
Development of the growing city continued in the early 20th century. The first high school was erected in 1905, across from the present-day First Baptist Church. The post office in Itta Bena was opened in 1918. The white minority dominated politics and the economy, as the state legislature essentially disenfranchised blacks by the constitution of 1890. Working as sharecroppers and tenant farmers, they had difficulty getting ahead in the agricultural economy. During the 20th century, many left the county for work in industrial cities of the north and midwest, in the Great Migration.

On a march in 1966 between Itta Bena and nearby Greenwood, coordinated by the SNCC but led by Martin Luther King Jr., Stokely Carmichael coined the rallying phrase "Black power!". Byron De La Beckwith, known as the murderer of Medgar Evers, drove his truck by the marchers three times while the local police looked on.

The city reached its peak of population in 1980. Population has declined since then, reflecting limited opportunities in the rural region. The population has decreased more markedly in the county outside the city, as agricultural jobs have been reduced.

== Geography ==
According to the United States Census Bureau, the city has a total area of 1.5 square miles (3.9 km^{2}), of which 1.4 square miles (3.6 km^{2}) is land and 0.04 square miles (0.10 km^{2}) (2.72%) is water.

== Demographics ==
Historical population
Census	Pop.	Note	%±
1900	416		—
1910	1,427		243.0%
1920	1,620		13.5%
1930	1,370		−15.4%
1940	1,795		31.0%
1950	1,725		−3.9%
1960	1,914		11.0%
1970	2,489		30.0%
1980	2,904		16.7%
1990	2,377		−18.1%
2000	2,208		−7.1%
2010	2,049		−7.2%
2020	1,679		−18.1%
U.S. Decennial Census

=== Racial and ethnic composition ===
Itta Bena city, Mississippi – Racial and ethnic composition Note: the US Census treats Hispanic/Latino as an ethnic category. This table excludes Latinos from the racial categories and assigns them to a separate category. Hispanics/Latinos may be of any race.
Race / Ethnicity (NH = Non-Hispanic)	Pop 2000	Pop 2010	Pop 2020	% 2000	% 2010	% 2020
White alone (NH)	394	206	80	17.84%	10.05%	4.76%
Black or African American alone (NH)	1,773	1,828	1,550	80.30%	89.21%	92.32%
Native American or Alaska Native alone (NH)	0	1	0	0.00%	0.05%	0.00%
Asian alone (NH)	5	0	0	0.23%	0.00%	0.00%
Native Hawaiian or Pacific Islander alone (NH)	0	0	0	0.00%	0.00%	0.00%
Other race alone (NH)	0	0	5	0.00%	0.00%	0.30%
Mixed race or Multiracial (NH)	2	3	19	0.09%	0.15%	1.13%
Hispanic or Latino (any race)	34	11	25	1.54%	0.54%	1.49%
Total	2,208	2,049	1,679	100.00%	100.00%	100.00%

=== 2020 census ===
As of the 2020 census, Itta Bena had a population of 1,679. The median age was 39.6 years. 23.2% of residents were under the age of 18 and 16.3% of residents were 65 years of age or older. For every 100 females, there were 79.2 males, and for every 100 females age 18 and over, there were 72.5 males.

0.0% of residents lived in urban areas, while 100.0% lived in rural areas.

There were 685 households in Itta Bena, of which 33.4% had children under the age of 18 living in them. Of all households, 21.9% were married-couple households, 20.0% were households with a male householder and no spouse or partner present, and 52.4% were households with a female householder and no spouse or partner present. About 32.6% of all households were made up of individuals, and 13.3% had someone living alone who was 65 years of age or older.

There were 804 housing units, of which 14.8% were vacant. The homeowner vacancy rate was 2.3% and the rental vacancy rate was 10.9%.

=== 2010 census ===
As of the 2010 United States census, there were 2,049 people living in the city. The racial makeup of the city was 89.2% Black, 10.1% White, <0.1% Native American and 0.1% from two or more races. 0.5% were Hispanic or Latino of any race.

=== 2000 census ===
As of the census of 2000, there were 2,208 people, 763 households, and 559 families living in the city. The population density was 1,541.5 inhabitants per square mile (595.2/km^{2}). There were 797 housing units at an average density of 556.4 per square mile (214.8/km^{2}). The racial makeup of the city was 81.34% African American, 18.16% White, 0.23% Asian, and 0.27% from two or more races. Hispanic or Latino of any race were 1.54% of the population.

There were 763 households, of which 38.9% had children under the age of 18 living with them, 32.6% were married couples living together, 35.4% had a female householder with no husband present, and 26.7% were non-families. 24.0% of all households were made up of individuals, and 12.8% had someone living alone who was 65 years of age or older. The average household size was 2.89 and the average family size was 3.43.

In the city, the population was spread out, with 33.3% under the age of 18, 11.7% from 18 to 24, 25.6% from 25 to 44, 18.3% from 45 to 64, and 11.1% who were 65 years of age or older. The median age was 29 years. For every 100 females, there were 82.2 males. For every 100 females age 18 and over, there were 71.4 males.

The median income for a household in the city was $20,968, and the median income for a family was $24,271. Males had a median income of $21,917 versus $16,136 for females. The per capita income for the city was $11,132. About 29.5% of families and 34.5% of the population were below the poverty line, including 43.1% of those under age 18 and 33.1% of those age 65 or over.

== Education ==
Mississippi Valley State University is located 1 mile (1.6 km) northwest of Itta Bena in unincorporated Leflore County. It was the state of Mississippi's black vocational college before educational segregation ended. The Mississippi Valley State Delta Devils football team play at Itta Bena's 10,000-seat Rice–Totten Stadium.

The City of Itta Bena is served by the Greenwood-Leflore Consolidated School District. Public schools in Itta Bena include Leflore County Elementary School and Leflore County High School. It was previously in the Leflore County School District. Effective July 1, 2019 this district consolidated into the Greenwood-Leflore School District.

== Notable people ==
- Andre Allen, former Canadian Football League defensive end
- Smoky Babe, blues musician
- Marion Barry, civil rights activist, city councilman and former mayor of Washington, D.C.
- James Bevel, civil rights activist
- Robert "Big Mojo" Elem, Chicago blues bass guitarist and singer
- Katie Hall, U.S. Representative from Indiana; attended Mississippi Valley State University in Itta Bena
- Luther "Guitar Junior" Johnson, blues musician
- B.B. King, blues musician, was born near Itta Bena in 1925
- Jimmy Lewis, soul singer, producer, and songwriter
- Lewis Nordan, author, grew up in Itta Bena
- Robert Petway, delta blues musician was possibly born here in 1903
- Euvester Simpson, voting rights activist and Student Nonviolent Coordinating Committee (SNCC) member
- Pervis Spann, broadcaster and music promoter
