= Euvester Simpson =

American voting rights activist

Euvester Simpson (yu-ves-tor; born December 12, 1945) is an American voting rights activist and contributor to the Civil Rights Movement in the 1950s and 1960s. A Student Nonviolent Coordinating Committee (SNCC) member at the age of 17, she helped black people learn to read, write, and register to vote in Mississippi during the movement. She was an active member in the movement through its entirety. She was involved in the Winona, Mississippi bus incident.

== Biography ==
Simpson was originally from Itta Bena, Mississippi. Her father sent her to Wisconsin to continue schooling following the murder of Emmett Till. Simpson went to Mississippi and enrolled in Amanda Elzy High School. She became involved in the civil rights movement.

Simpson joined the Student Nonviolent Coordinating Committee (SNCC) at the age of 17 in 1963. On June 9, she and a group of SNCC members were on their way home from a literacy workshop in Charleston, South Carolina. In Winona, Mississippi, the group was arrested and jailed for being in a white only area of the bus terminal, although a previous Interstate Commerce Commission (ICC) ruling had given them the right to be there. That night some members of the group were beaten and sexually assaulted by the officers at the jail. The incident was reported extensively in the press.

Following this incident, Simpson began helping blacks learn to read, write, and register to vote. She was arrested while acting as a poll watcher for elections in Madison County.

Simpson married in 1965 and had five children. She remained active in SNCC through the 1960s. Following the movement, Simpson obtained her bachelor's degree from Millsaps College in 1995.

In 2013, Simpson was presented with an award from the Fannie Lou Hamer Institute at Jackson State University.

Simpson served on the board of the Veterans of the Mississippi Civil Rights Movement. She helped organize the 30th anniversary of the Freedom Summer in 1994 and was involved in coordinating its 50th anniversary in 2014. She attends memorials, celebrations, and anniversaries of the Civil Rights Movement, and continues to conduct interviews and discussions surrounding the movement.

== Personal ==
In 2015, Simpson, a grandmother of 12, resides in Jackson, Mississippi.
