= Hitotarashi =

2026 single by Keisuke Kuwata

Single by Keisuke Kuwata
- Language: Japanese
- Released: June 24, 2026
- Studio: Victor; Neko ni Koban
- Length: 4:42
- Label: Taishita
- Songwriter: Keisuke Kuwata
- Producer: Keisuke Kuwata

Keisuke Kuwata singles chronology
"Kimi e no Tegami" (2016)	"Hitotarashi" (2026)

"Hitotarashi" (Japanese: 人誑し / ひとたらし) is a song by Japanese musician Keisuke Kuwata. It was released as his eighteenth single on June 24, 2026, by Taishita Label. Kuwata wrote the track to be the opening theme song of the Akane-banashi anime adaptation, and its lyrics feature references to its protagonist and the rakugo art form. One of the single's six other tracks is "Akane on My Mind: Manjū Kowai" (AKANE On My Mind～饅頭こわい), the anime's ending theme song. "Hitotarashi" topped multiple Oricon and Billboard Japan charts, and has sold over 118,000 copies.

== Background and composition ==
Keisuke Kuwata received the offer to write both the opening and ending theme songs, which is considered unusual, to Akane-banashi by the anime's staff. He accepted after reading the original manga, which is about rakugo, something he is a fan of. The songs mark the first time he had completely written and composed an anime theme song in his 48-year career. (Note: Although Kuwata performed and composed the music to the Chibi Maruko-chan theme "Hyaku-man Nen no Shiawase!!", its lyrics were written by Momoko Sakura.) The collaboration was unveiled on February 26, 2026 (Kuwata's 70th birthday), via an animated video created by Zexcs, the studio behind the anime, where Kuwata voiced himself.

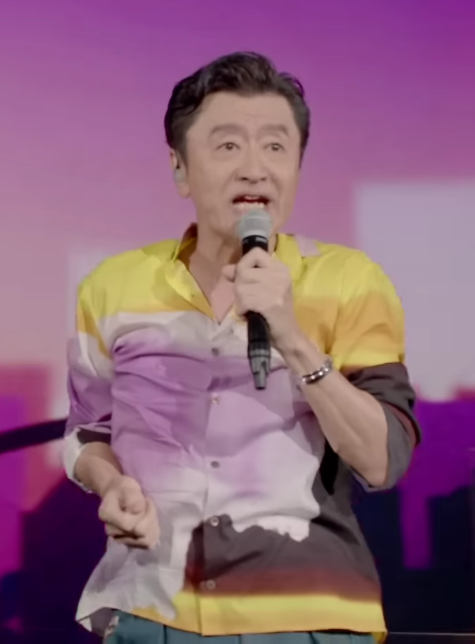
"Hitotarashi" and "Akane on My Mind: Manjū Kowai" mark the first time Keisuke Kuwata had written anime theme songs in his 48-year career.

Because he was unfamiliar with modern anime music, the staff gave Kuwata materials analyzing anime songs from recent years, such as their BPMs, and he was shown the anime's visuals. He then began production by figuring out the song's progression and tempo; using the words "rakugo" and "female performer" as a guide, he built a mental image by picturing the rakugo setting, the female protagonist's age, what her father is like, what her rival looks like, and so on, while playing the guitar. Kuwata finished "Akane on My Mind: Manjū Kowai" first, but felt it did not capture the tension needed for an opening theme and that it did not fit the Reiwa era. It was ultimately used for the closing credits instead. Its title and lyrics feature numerous references to the protagonist of Akane-banashi: for example, "Manjū Kowai" is the name of a rakugo story she performs in the series.

Kuwata then started creating "Hitotarashi" by thinking about how songs by Ado, Fujii Kaze and Kenshi Yonezu have a sense of tension and momentum. The word "Hitotarashi" refers to a person who easily charms others, but can also imply a manipulative nature, and likely refers to a skilled rakugoka who enchants audiences through their art. The lyrics reference real rakugo stories, such as "Ukiyodoko", "Kaen Daiko" and "Kubittake". Makoto Hasegawa of Spice found several phrases in the lyrics to symbolize gender-based barriers, and interpreted them as cheering on the anime's protagonist, given that female performers had not established themselves in rakugo until the 1970s. The song's chorus includes an English-language call-and-response. Atsuo Katayama co-arranged the song with Kuwata and handled the string arrangements, and the track features Makoto Saito on guitar, Kaoru Yamauchi on bass and Chieko Kinbara on violin. Junichi Soga programmed the rhythm and synthesizers, while Tiger and Kuwata's wife and Southern All Stars bandmate Yuko Hara are both credited as backing vocalists.

The third song on the single is "Nanya Music City". The "Nanya" in the title refers to Seiko Nanya, a stage director who has worked on the concerts by Kuwata and Southern All Stars for years. Influenced by the Beatles, Kuwata likes to include people he is close to in his songs and also finds it easier to write lyrics when he does. In this particular case, the idea came to him while he was in the midst of the usual "battle" of trying to fit Japanese lyrics onto Western melodies; he had come up with the phrase "Music City" and was debating between using "In the Music City" or "What a Music City", when he realized "Nanya" would fit, and wrote the song in dedication to the stage director.

When the Kanro candy company made Kuwata an offer to appear in a commercial and write the jingle for it, he surprised them by offering four jingles in different music genres: enka, disco, rock and a cappella. This led to the production of four distinct commercials featuring either "Mitarashi Bojo / Enka Version", "Ame to Mirrorball / Disco Version", "Ame-chan Man / Rock Version" or "Seinaru Kanro Ame / Doo-wop Version". All four commercial tracks are included on "Hitotarashi".

== Release ==
The title track of "Hitotarashi" was first released digitally on April 3, 2026, while "Akane on My Mind: Manjū Kowai" was released digitally on June 8, 2026. The single, Kuwata's first in ten years, was released on CD on June 24, 2026. The cover art features Kuwata laying amongst trash bags and other discarded items and was taken from the title track's music video. Its limited edition contains an acrylic stand of an image drawn by Takamasa Moue, the illustrator of Akane-banashi, that depicts Kuwata playing guitar alongside the manga's protagonist, Akane Arakawa.

The single was released on vinyl on July 8, 2026. The vinyl edition's cover art features a flower mimicking a human mouth, in reference to the meaning of the word "Hitotarashi". Those who pre-ordered any physical edition, received a wooden keychain featuring Kuwata's name carved in yosemoji on one side and a printed design based on the cover art to the digital version of "Hitotarashi" on the other.

Kuwata performed both "Hitotarashi" and "Akane on My Mind: Manjū Kowai" on the June 26, 2026, episode of Music Station.

== Music videos ==
The music video for "Hitotarashi" was released on June 24, 2026. Featuring over 200 cast members, it was the largest video shoot of his career. It opens with Kuwata driving a convertible sports car, before coming upon a highway traffic jam. Getting out, he walks past various unusual scenes and follows a beautiful woman, played by Sumire Sato. Performance sequences of Kuwata and a band, composed of bassist Kaoru Yamauchi, backing vocalist Tiger, violinist Crusher Kimura, guitarist Issei Kobayashi of Ryokuoushoku Shakai and drummer Hona Ikoka from Gesu no Kiwami Otome, are inter-cut throughout. The video ends with Kuwata being beaten up and thrown into the back of a pickup truck alongside trash bags and other discarded items.

An animated music video for "Akane on My Mind: Manjū Kowai", created by the staff of the Akane-banashi anime, was released on June 27, 2026. Serving as a prequel to the special animated video released earlier on February 26, in which an animated version of Kuwata announced that "Hitotarashi" had been selected as the opening theme, it features Kuwata eating a manjū while watching Akane-banashi on a TV in his dressing room.

== Reception ==
"Hitotarashi" topped both the Oricon Albums Chart and the Billboard Japan Hot Albums chart, with 118,221 copies sold in its first week. (Note: Despite being a single, Oricon classifies "Hitotarashi" as an album because of how many tracks it contains.) It also topped the Oricon Combined Albums Chart, which combines physical sales, digital downloads and streams, and Billboard Japan's Top Albums Sales chart, which is based solely on physical sales.

Makoto Hasegawa of Spice described "Hitotarashi" as representing a "fusion of tradition and the avant-garde, brimming with a playful spirit and a sense of adventure." They wrote that it reconstructs and updates Western and Japanese music from the 1970s, finding the guitar riff that begins the song to be reminiscent of the group sounds era, while the inclusion of flute and strings evokes both Japanese and Irish influences.

Masaki Uchida of Real Sound pointed out the lyrical references to rakugo and the story of Akane-banashi in "Hitotarashi". Like Hasegawa, he suggested the minor-key Merseybeat groove, driven by both electric and acoustic guitar, likely originates from group sounds. Uchida praised the violin melody, which he found reminiscent of Romani music.

In a review for Mikiki, Tomoyuki Mori wrote that the song features a message of encouragement for those who challenge established values and conventions in order to chase after their goals, and noted the lyrics are targeted not only to the protagonist of Akane-banashi and real-life female rakugoka, but to anyone fighting gender-barriers. He also felt that the word "Hitotarashi" is an appropriate term for both rakugoka and Kuwata, and praised Kuwata's vocal performance, opining that artificial intelligence would never be able to replicate it.

== Track listing ==
All music is composed by Keisuke Kuwata. All tracks arranged by Kuwata, except tracks 1–3, arranged by Kuwata and Atsuo Katayama.

No.	Title	Length
1.	"Hitotarashi" (人誑し / ひとたらし)	4:42
2.	"Akane on My Mind: Manjū Kowai" (AKANE On My Mind〜饅頭こわい)	4:18
3.	"Nanya Music City" (南谷ミュージック・シティー)	4:03
4.	"Mitarashi Bojō / Enka Version" (みたらし慕情 / 演歌編)	0:33
5.	"Ame to Mirrorball / Disco Version" (飴とミラーボール / ディスコ・ヴァージョン)	0:32
6.	"Ame-chan Man / Rock Version" (飴ちゃんマン / ロック編)	0:39
7.	"Seinaru Kanro Ame / Doo-wop Version" (聖なるカンロ飴 / ドゥーワップ・ヴァージョン)	0:37

== Personnel ==
- Keisuke Kuwata – vocals, electric guitar, tambourine, kazoo, cowbell and finger snaps
- Atsuo Katayama – synthesizers, pianos, Hammond organ, accordion and glockenspiel
- Junichi Soga – rhythm and synth programming on tracks 1–6
- Makoto Saito – electric and acoustic guitar on tracks 1–3
- Kaoru Yamauchi – bass on tracks 1–3
- Hiroshi Matsuda – drums on tracks 2 and 3
- Tiger – backing vocals on tracks 1 and 3
- Takuo Yamamoto – tenor saxophone and baritone saxophone on tracks 2 and 3
- Chieko Kinbara – violin on track 1
- Yuko Hara – backing vocals on track 1
- 401st All Stars – backing vocals on track 1
- Koji Nishimura – trumpet on track 3
- Ryosuke Kano – trombone on track 3
