= Palzer (surname) =

Palzer may be either a variant of Pelzer or a habitational surname for someone from the Palatinate. Notable people with the surname include:

- Al Palzer (1890–1917), American boxer
- Anton Palzer (1993), German ski mountaineer and cyclist
- Jacques Palzer (1900–1979), Luxembourgish gymnast
