= Peggy Scott-Adams =

American singer (1948–2023)

- Born: Peggy Stoutmeyer; June 25, 1948; Opp, Alabama, US
- Died: March 27, 2023 (aged 74) Pensacola, Florida, US
- Genres: soul; blues; R&B
- Instruments: vocals

Peggy Scott-Adams (born Peggy Stoutmeyer; June 25, 1948 – March 27, 2023) was an American soul, blues and R&B singer. Earlier in her career, she was billed as Peggy Scott, and was known as 'The Little Lady with the Big Voice'.

== Early life and career ==
Peggy Stoutmeyer was born on June 25, 1948, in Opp, Alabama, but grew up in Pensacola, Florida. Throughout her early career, Scott toured with Ben E. King as a teenager. She hit the Top 40 three times with "Lover's Holiday" (July 1968) (No. 19, Canada), "Pickin' Wild Mountain Berries" (November 1968) (No. 31, Canada), and "Soulshake" (February 1969) (No. 36, Canada) as a duet act with Jo Jo Benson. All of these singles were released by SSS International Records. Not long after that, out of the music industry since the late 1960s, she was working as a lounge singer in Pensacola until she moved to California, where she married Robert L. Adams Sr. in 1988. He died in 2005.

== Solo career ==
Scott was persuaded to return to the studio by singer-songwriter and producer Jimmy Lewis. With his guidance, they recorded her solo debut album, Help Yourself, released on October 22, 1996.

One of the Jimmy Lewis songs was a track about a woman complaining that her husband had romantic and sexual desires for another man. Released as a single initially just to blues radio stations, the song, "Bill", also began getting airplay on Urban contemporary radio and soon gained most-requested status at several larger stations. It peaked at number 87 on the Billboard Hot 100. The music video to "Bill" also became popular. The album, Help Yourself began selling well, making the Billboard 200 albums chart, peaking at number 72, number 9 on the R&B chart and number 1 on the Top Blues Albums chart.

The release of Contagious later in 1997 also featured the hit single "Spousal Abuse", which tackled the issue of domestic abuse in relationships. Her third album, Undisputed Queen, was released in 1999. She continued in 2000 with Live in Alabama & More, which featured the ballad, "When I'm With You" and the dance track "Sweaty Men". Both singles became hits. The next album was Hot and Sassy.

== Later life and death ==
Her fifth album, Busting Loose, was released in 2003. It featured the lead single, "If You Wanna Hear Me Holler, Lick Me Up Some Dollars". In 2006, she issued her first gospel album entitled God Can, And He Will. Her second gospel album, Back To The Roots, was released in 2009 on her own independent label, Nora Records.

Adams died on March 27, 2023, at the age of 74, in her native Pensacola, Florida.

== Discography and Chart Singles ==
=== Chart singles ===
Year	Single	Chart Positions	
Year	Single	US Pop	US R&B
1968	"Lover's Holiday"	31	8
1968	"Pickin' Wild Mountain Berries"	27	8
1969	"Soulshake"	37	13
1969	"I Want to Love You Baby"	81	24
1997	"Bill"	87	

=== Singles ===
- "Bill"
- "Slow Drag"
- "Help Yourself"
- "Spousal Abuse"
- "I'm in Love"
- "I'll Take Care of You"
- "That's How I Do It"
- "When You're Married To a Fool"
- "You Will Always Be My Man"
- "When I'm With You"
- "Sweaty Men"
- "If I'm Not Still Married"
- "Mr. Right or Mr. Wrong"
- "See You Next Weekend"
- "Your Divorce Has Been Denied"
- "What'cha Doin' to Me"
- "If You Wanna Hear Me Holler, Lick Me Up Some Dollars"
- "I Intend To Take Your Place"

=== Albums ===
- 1996: Help Yourself (Miss Butch/Mardi Gras Records)
- 1997: Contagious (Miss Butch)
- 1999: Undisputed Queen (Miss Butch)
- 2000: Live in Alabama & More (Miss Butch)
- 2001: Hot and Sassy (Miss Butch)
- 2005: Busting Loose (Miss Butch)
- 2006: Best Of Peggy Scott-Adams:16 Hits! (Miss Butch)
- 2006: God Can, And He Will (Mardi Gras)
- 2009: Back To The Roots (Nora Records)
- 2012: Life After Bill (CD Baby)

== See also ==
- Jo Jo Benson
- R&B
- Blues
