= Would You Believe? (Ray Charles album) =

Studio album by Ray Charles
- Released: 1990
- Label: Warner Bros.
- Producer: Ray Charles, Jimmy Lewis

Ray Charles chronology
Seven Spanish Angels and Other Hits (1989)	Would You Believe? (1990)	The Classic Years (1991)

Would You Believe? is an album by the American musician Ray Charles, released in 1990. He supported the album by touring with B.B. King. Would You Believe? was Charles's first album for Warner Bros. Records. The first single was "I'll Take Care of You".

== Production ==
The album was produced by Jimmy Lewis, who also wrote some of the songs. It is evenly divided between songs describing the joys of love and songs about the sorrows of love. Charles employed drum machines and synthesizers for the first time on an album. He provided the backing vocals on many of the tracks. "Your Love Keeps Me Satisfied" is a cover of the Billy Preston song. "Living Without You" was written by Johnny Mandel. "Let's Get Back Where We Left Off" is a duet with Peggy Scott.

== Critical reception ==
Professional ratings
Review scores
Source	Rating
AllMusic	2.5/5 stars
Chicago Tribune	3/4 stars
Entertainment Weekly	B−
The Rolling Stone Album Guide	1.5/5 stars
The Virgin Encyclopedia of R&B and Soul	2/5 stars
Windsor Star	B+

The Chicago Tribune determined that "Charles matches his gritty vocals against a backing of synthesizers and drum machines and—amazingly—triumphs over technology." Entertainment Weekly wrote that "Living Without You" "lightens up a touching, jazzy lament with a flittering sound that crosses clarinet and viola." The Kingston Whig-Standard stated that "because Mr. Charles is still a marvelous singer and the songs are carefully chosen, this album is a delight." The Star Tribune deemed the album "a frustrating mix of substandard songs and amateurish production guaranteed to disappoint even the most ardent fan." LA Weekly concluded that Charles's "voice is still harsh/pretty, carrying an edge of ache and melancholy even in the light moments."

== Track listing ==
No.	Title	Length
1.	"I'll Take Care of You"
2.	"Your Love Keeps Me Satisfied"
3.	"Ellie, My Love"
4.	"I Can't Get Enough"
5.	"Let's Get Back Where We Left Off"
6.	"Child Support, Alimony"
7.	"Fresh Out of Tears"
8.	"Living Without You"
9.	"Where's the Stairs?"
10.	"Leave Him!"
