= Richard B. Pelzer =

American public speaker and author (1965–2019)

- Born: Richard Bryan Pelzer; June 16, 1965; San Francisco, California, U.S.
- Died: September 13, 2019 (aged 54)
- Education: Southern New Hampshire University
- Occupations: Memoirist, novelist, public speaker
- Children: 4
- Family: Dave Pelzer (brother)

Richard Bryan Pelzer (June 16, 1965 – September 13, 2019) was an American public speaker, memoirist and author. He was the author of A Brother's Journey and its follow up, A Teenager's Journey.

== Biography ==
Pelzer was the fourth of five sons of Stephen Pelzer and Catherine Roerva. He received his bachelor's degree in child and adolescent development from Southern New Hampshire University in 2015.

He was divorced with four children.

Pelzer published his memoir, A Brother's Journey, an account of the story of his young adult life. Pelzer was also the author of A Teenager's Journey, which recounts his teenage years. His brother, Dave Pelzer, was severely abused by their mother when he was a child.

== Controversy ==
Pelzer and his brother Dave Pelzer, who wrote A Child Called "It" about his own abuse by their mother, have raised questions about each's depictions of their childhoods. Articles in The New York Times Magazine and Slate have expressed skepticism of claims made by Dave Pelzer.

== Death ==
Richard Pelzer died by suicide on September 13, 2019, after a difficult battle with his mental health.

== Bibliography ==
Pelzer wrote two memoirs about the abuse he suffered as a child at the hands of his mother.

- A Brother's Journey: Surviving a Childhood of Abuse
- A Teenager's Journey: Overcoming a Childhood of Abuse

== Resources ==
- Contemporary Authors Online, Gale, 2006. Reproduced in Biography Resource Center. Farmington Hills, Mich.: Thomson Gale. 2006.
