= Help Yourself (book) =

2000 book by Dave Pelzer

Help Yourself: Finding Hope, Courage, and Happiness
- First edition
- Author: Dave Pelzer
- Language: English
- Genre: Self-help book
- Publisher: Dutton
- Publication date: 2000
- Publication place: United States
- Pages: 218
- ISBN: 0-452-28276-4
- OCLC: 47847799

Help Yourself: Finding Hope, Courage, and Happiness is a 2000 self-help book by American author Dave Pelzer. It is the fourth book that Pelzer has written prior to The Privilege of Youth which continues the "Child Called "It" series.

== Content ==
In the book, Pelzer discusses the path to the accomplishment of life's goals. He explains how anyone can move beyond a painful past full of negativity and setbacks, recalling struggles from his own life and that of others. The last paragraph of this book contains the following: "I beg of you to take this with you always: Help Yourself...to a life you are not only capable of living, but one you are worthy of living."

== Reception ==
Jack Canfield, coauthor of Chicken Soup for the Soul, says that this book shows "a living example that all of us have the capability to better ourselves no matter what the odds... Dave Pelzer inspires us all."

A book review at circlesoflight.com blog praised Help Yourself's simplicity, stating that "unlike many self-help works, this book is written on a level that anyone with an [sic] 7th or 8th grade reading ability can benefit from it." It also mentions, though, that the book can apply just as well to a person with a higher reading aptitude.
