= Help Yourself (Eddy Clearwater album) =

Studio album by Eddy Clearwater
- Released: 1992
- Genre: Blues
- Label: Blind Pig
- Producer: Jerry Del Giudice, Michael Freeman

Eddy Clearwater chronology
Real Good Time: Live! (1990)	Help Yourself (1992)	Live at the Kingston Mines, 1978 (1992)

Help Yourself is an album by the American musician Eddy Clearwater, released in 1992. He supported the album with North American and international tours that included shows in Turkey.

== Production ==
The album was produced by Jerry Del Giudice and Michael Freeman. Clearwater added elements of country music and rock and roll to his blues sound on many of the tracks. His cousin Carey Bell played harmonica on the album. The title track is a version of the Jimmy Reed song. "All Your Love" is a cover of the Otis Rush song. The interpretation of "Poison Ivy" was based on Willie Mabon's version of the song. The closing track, "We're Out of Here", is an instrumental.

== Critical reception ==
Professional ratings
Review scores
Source	Rating
AllMusic	3/5 stars
The Buffalo News	3.5/5 stars
The Grove Press Guide to the Blues on CD	4/5 stars
The Indianapolis Star	3/4 stars
MusicHound Blues: The Essential Album Guide	3.5/5 stars
The Penguin Guide to Blues Recordings	2.5/4 stars
The Press of Atlantic City	3.5/4 stars
The Rolling Stone Jazz & Blues Album Guide	3.5/5 stars
The Virgin Encyclopedia of the Blues	2/5 stars

The Chicago Tribune said that Clearwater "serves up slow blues, shuffles and rockers, sad songs, think pieces and good jokes." The Indianapolis Star opined that "Clearwater still sounds like a young Chuck Berry, notably on the rock and soul 'Little Bit of Blues'". Stereo Review stated that "Clearwater has a compelling voice and properly rooted guitar style... He handles the pop-oriented material skillfully, including slivers of country-and-western, but he is at his best when he digs deep down into the blues". The Washington Post concluded that "most [songs] feature toss-away lyrics ... and seem lightweight or derivative compared with the album's occasional strong points". In 1996, the Toronto Star praised Clearwater's "unique, durable recipe of belting West Side blues and rockabilly rollers".

== Track listing ==
No.	Title	Length
1.	"Who Loves You Baby"
2.	"Help Yourself"
3.	"Set It Out"
4.	"All Your Love"
5.	"Chicago Weather Woman"
6.	"Crossover"
7.	"That's My Baby"
8.	"Big Time Gambler"
9.	"Little Bit of Blues"
10.	"Poison Ivy"
11.	"Messed Up World"
12.	"We're Out of Here"
