= Dave Pelzer =

American author (born 1960)

David Pelzer
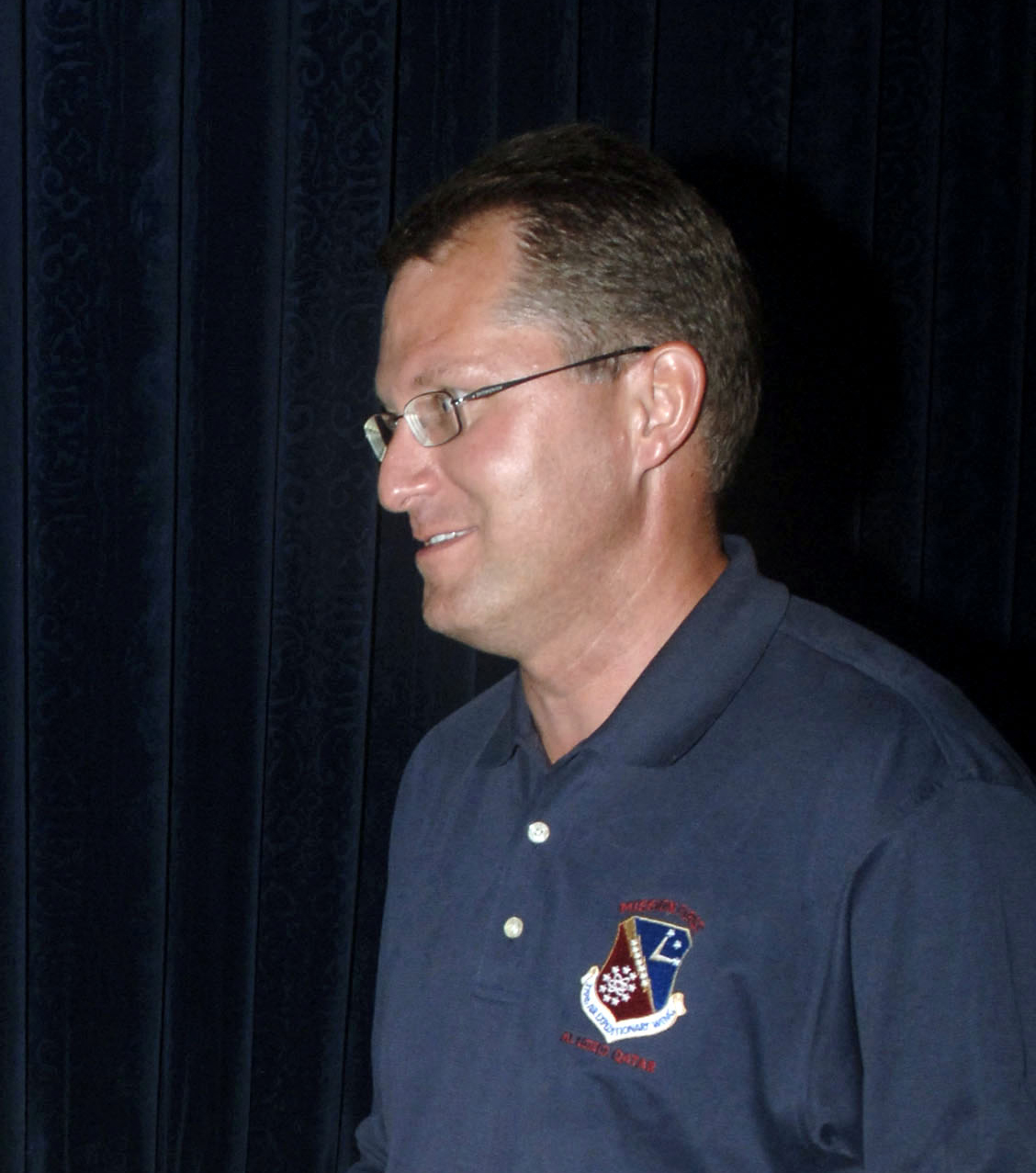
- Pelzer in 2006
- Born: December 29, 1960 (age 65); San Francisco, California, U.S.
- Occupations: Autobiographer, motivational speaker
- Spouse(s): "Patsy" (m. 198?; div. ??); Marsha Donohoe (m. 199?)
- Relatives: Richard B. Pelzer (brother)
- Writing career
- Notable works: A Child Called "It", Help Yourself
- Website: www.davepelzer.com

David James Pelzer (born December 29, 1960) is an American author of several autobiographical and self-help books. His 1995 memoir of childhood abuse, A Child Called "It": One Child's Courage to Survive, was listed on The New York Times Best Seller list for several years, and in 5 years had sold at least 1.6 million copies. The book brought Pelzer fame, and has also been a source of controversy: family members and journalists have accused Pelzer of fabricating several events in the book.

== Biography ==
Pelzer was born in San Francisco, California on December 29, 1960, and was the second of five boys. He grew up in Daly City, California. He is the son of Catherine Roerva Christensen Pelzer (1929–1992) and San Francisco fireman Stephen Joseph Pelzer (1923–1980). Pelzer's books describe the abuse he suffered for several years of his childhood, including continual mistreatment and beatings by his mother, who he said thought of it as a game. His teachers stepped in on March 5, 1973, and 12-year-old Pelzer was placed in foster care. At age 18, in 1979, he joined the United States Air Force. Serving as an in-flight refueling technician (boom operator), he served in the Gulf War and left the U.S. Air Force after thirteen years of service at the rank of Technical Sergeant. In the 1980s, Pelzer married his first wife, Patsy (a pseudonym), with whom he had a son. In 1996, he carried a torch in the Summer Olympics torch relay. Pelzer and Patsy divorced, and many years later, he married his second wife, Marsha Donohoe, who was his editor.

== Childhood experiences ==
Pelzer's book A Child Called "It" describes from his viewpoint the severe abuse he suffered as a child. He refers to his relatives by pseudonyms. He writes how his mother was physically and emotionally abusive towards him from ages 4 to 12. He describes how his mom starved him, forced him to drink ammonia, stabbed him in the stomach, burned his arm on a gas stove, and forced him to eat his own vomit. He mentioned that his father was not active in resolving or stopping the conflicts between Pelzer and his alcoholic mother. He was sent to a foster family at age 12 in 1973. His second book The Lost Boy covers the time frame when he was in foster care. By the time Pelzer was taken out of the home, he had already suffered a great deal mentally. This caused Pelzer to act out growing up. Although the main abuse had stopped, he continued to face mental anguish. Throughout his teen years, he struggled to feel loved. Being in a foster home and having suffered abuse caused him to yearn for the family and love he could not have. He later forgave his father for ignoring the abuse, and wrote a letter to his mom saying he loved her as his mother, but would never see her again. She died before he could send it. Throughout the rest of his life, he somewhat healed from the abuse but would never forget what he had been through. He has written several self help books to help others overcome the challenges and abuse they have suffered.

One of Pelzer's brothers, Richard B. Pelzer, published his own autobiography, A Brother's Journey, that detailed his experiences. Richard Pelzer said in the afterword of his book that his objective for his story was to show how a parent can become abusive and how the human spirit can triumph and survive.

== Books ==
Pelzer's first book, A Child Called "It", was published in 1995 and describes the abuse Pelzer suffered in his childhood. His second book, The Lost Boy: A Foster Child's Search for the Love of a Family was published shortly after in 1997. The book covered Pelzer's teen years. The third book in his series, A Man Named Dave: A Story of Triumph and Forgiveness was about Pelzer's experiences as an adult and how he forgave his father. In 2001, he wrote Help Yourself: Finding Hope, Courage, And Happiness which was a self-help book. When discussing his seventh book Moving Forward he said, "My message has always been about resilience."

- A Child Called "It" – Pelzer's first book, it tells his story and describes the physical and mental abuse he suffered from ages 4–12 at the hands of his mother. This book goes into detail about the abuse, including beatings, starvation, manipulation games, and being stabbed. The book ends with Pelzer being placed into foster care.
- The Lost Boy – Pelzer's second book and a continuation of his first book, A Child Called "It". This book was released in 1997 and covers the time period in Pelzer's life when he was in foster care. During this book, Pelzer faces great emotional turmoil. He went to court and described what his mother had done, ending with him in the foster care system. Pelzer wondered if the abuse he endured was his fault. While in his first foster home, Pelzer acted out frequently and was involved in petty theft. He would still see his mother, who would promise to get him back, but he eventually ended up going to different foster families, getting in more trouble, and finally getting sent to a juvenile hall. After Pelzer aged out of foster care, he enlisted in the Air Force. The book ends with Pelzer having learned how to treat others and be a better person.
- A Man Named David – This book is the third in the A Child Called "It" series. This book takes place when Pelzer is an adult. It describes him becoming the person he is now, and how he handles what happened in the past. He tries to find answers and ways to heal in this book, as well as trying to find closure with his biological parents.

=== Reception of A Child Called "It" ===
His first book, A Child Called "It," was successful and generated interest. It was listed on The New York Times Best Seller list for several years and in five years had sold at least 1.6 million copies. Pelzer was invited to television shows such as The Montel Williams Show and The Oprah Winfrey Show to give interviews after the book was published.

In a 2001 news article, Orion UK Publishing's Trevor Dolby said, "We get 10 letters a day from people saying the first book mirrors their own childhood, which is very depressing." One reader was quoted: "(The book) made me see that I wasn't the only one out there...that had this...in their life. That there's people who do understand."

Writer David Plotz criticized Pelzer in an article he wrote for Slate. In the article Plotz says that because Pelzer's parents are dead they cannot question how they are depicted.

==== Awards ====
A Child Called "It" has received the following accolades:

- 2010 Popular Paperbacks for Young Adults
- 2002 Popular Paperbacks for Young Adults

==== Challenges ====
According to the American Library Association, A Child Called "It" has been frequently banned and challenged in the United States. The book landed the 36th spot on the list of the top books challenged between 2010 and 2019.

== Controversy ==
In 2002, Pat Jordan wrote a disputed article in The New York Times Magazine that questioned the reliability of Pelzer's recollections. He said that "Pelzer has an exquisite recall of his abuse, but almost no recall of anything that would authenticate that abuse", such as any details about his mother. Pelzer's younger brother, Stephen Pelzer, has disputed his book, denying that any abuse took place, and stating that he thinks Pelzer was placed in foster care because "he started a fire and was caught shoplifting", and goes on to accuse Pelzer of having been discharged from the U.S. Air Force on psychological grounds. However, another brother, Richard Pelzer, author of the book A Brother's Journey, affirms much of what Pelzer has said and describes his own abuse when Dave was finally removed from the home. In regard to Stephen's comments, Pelzer has said that Stephen is "semi-retarded, he has Bell's palsy. He worshipped my mum. He misses her terribly because she protected him." Furthermore, he has documented proof that – contrary to Stephen's accusations – he was honorably discharged from the U.S. Air Force. Due to the criticism from The New York Times Magazine article, Pelzer does not give interviews often.

In an article in The Boston Globe, Pelzer's maternal grandmother said she believed Pelzer had been abused but not as severely as he described. She also said she did not believe his brother Richard was abused. It was revealed, however, that Pelzer's grandmother did not live in the same state as his family and was not in contact with them at the time of the abuse.

In a review for The Guardian, Geraldine Bedell notes that gaps in the background narrative "makes the foreground harder to trust", but believes that "substantially, [Pelzer]'s telling the truth ... But there is a definite feeling of exaggeration in the later two books...". More than any concern about the veracity of all the minutiae in the novel, she was bothered by the trend of authors even writing about their abusive childhoods, grouping Pelzer with Andrea Ashworth, Jennifer Lauck, Martin Amis and Tony Thornton as authors who she feels are merely profiting from their abuse by writing in an entertaining style – though she does mention examples of "national and local agencies working with sexual-abuse survivors" appreciating the honest portrayal of what happens in these situations.

== Other work ==
Pelzer does community work and has given lectures across the country. As a motivational speaker, he speaks to high school students and adults about the concept of resilience.

== Work ==
- A Child Called "It" (1995)
- The Lost Boy: A Foster Child's Search for the Love of a Family (1997)
- A Man Named Dave: A Story of Triumph and Forgiveness (2000)
- Help Yourself (2000)
- The Privilege of Youth (2004)
- Help Yourself for Teens (2005)
- Moving Forward (2009)

== See also ==
- Richard B. Pelzer
