= Jimmy Lewis (musician) =

American musician (1937–2004)

- Born: James Eddie Lewis; November 19, 1937; Itta Bena, Mississippi, U.S.
- Died: September 11, 2004 (aged 66) Los Angeles, California, U.S.
- Genres: R&B, soul, jazz
- Occupations: Singer, songwriter, record producer
- Instruments: Guitar, piano, vocals
- Years active: c.1960 to 2000
- Labels: Era, Tangerine, Buddah, Hotlanta, Miss Butch
- Formerly of: The Drifters

James Eddie Lewis (November 19, 1937 – September 11, 2004) was an American soul singer, songwriter, arranger and producer. He was a member of the Drifters in the 1960s, worked as a songwriter and producer with Ray Charles, and wrote songs for Z. Z. Hill, among many others.

== Biography ==
Born in Itta Bena, Mississippi, he moved to Los Angeles, California, by the late 1950s. He worked with songwriter Cliff Chambers and arranger James Carmichael (later the producer with The Commodores and Lionel Richie), and released a string of singles on the Cyclone and Four-J labels, including "Wait Until Spring" and "What Can I Do Now", but with limited commercial success. In 1963, he joined the Drifters, replacing Bobby Hendricks as lead singer, and remained with the group for two years. Resuming his solo career, Lewis then released singles on the Minit label, including "The Girls from Texas" / "Let Me Know", produced by Jimmy Holiday, which later became popular on the British Northern soul scene.

In 1968, some of his songs were heard by Ray Charles, who was impressed and started a long period of collaboration with Lewis. Their duet, "If It Wasn't For Bad Luck", reached number 21 on the Billboard R&B chart and number 77 on the Hot 100 in 1969, and Lewis wrote and arranged every track on Charles’ album Doing His Thing, which was nominated for a Grammy Award. Lewis also wrote Charles' 1970 hit "If You Were Mine", and recorded several singles under his own name on Charles' Tangerine record label, including "I'll Be Here" and "We Can Make It". Though critically acclaimed, his solo records continued to fail to reach the national charts. Nevertheless, he continued as a successful songwriter and producer for other musicians, including Arthur Adams ("It's Private Tonight", 1973), and John Edwards, whose version of Lewis' song "Careful Man" reached number 8 on the R&B chart in 1974.

In 1974, Lewis moved to the Hotlanta label, and released the album Totally Involved, described by critic Richie Unterberger as "respectable Southern-styled soul", on which he wrote and produced all the tracks. The album included the track "Help Me Understand You", which reached number 95 on the R&B chart in 1975, his only solo chart hit. Equally in 1974, the soundtrack was released for the Blaxploitation film Solomon King for which Lewis arranged and produced the music.

"Fans of monopoly capital will please explain how this belated subclassic of hortatory soul could happen anywhere but on a Southern indie label. Lewis, a former Ray Charles factotum, sounds a lot like Joe Tex, and like both Tex and the Genius he has little use for 'good taste.' Especially historic is the opening track, in praise of women who are not fine."

— More More More Latimore review in Christgau's Record Guide: Rock Albums of the Seventies (1981).

As a writer, he had further success in 1977, when Z. Z. Hill's "Love Is So Good When You're Stealing It" reached the R&B chart. Lewis continued to write for Hill after the latter's move to Malaco Records. Lewis continued to work as a writer, producer, and occasional recording artist, through the 1980s and 1990s, writing and producing on two of Ray Charles' albums, Would You Believe? (1990) and Strong Love Affair (1996). He also set up his own label, Miss Butch; wrote Peggy Scott-Adams' 1997 hit single, "Bill"; and produced Malaco musician Latimore. Around this time, he cut a few sides with Little Richard.

Lewis died in Los Angeles in 2004, aged 66, from unknown causes.
