= Eunyoung Choi =

South Korean animator

Choi Eun-young
- 최은영
- Born: South Korea
- Occupations: Studio executive; film producer; film director; animator
- Years active: 2005–present
- Known for: As director: Star Wars: Visions - Akakiri; As producer: Dandadan; The Night Is Short, Walk On Girl; Keep Your Hands Off Eizouken! The Heike Story
- Website: www.sciencesaru.com

Eunyoung Choi (Korean: 최은영) is a South Korean studio executive, producer, director and animator. She is the president and CEO of Science Saru, a Japanese animation studio which she co-founded with Masaaki Yuasa in 2013, and has served as producer of the company's works. In 2020, following the announcement that Yuasa would step down from an executive role at Science Saru, Choi assumed responsibility for the management of the studio. In 2021, she directed a short animated film entitled Akakiri for the short film anthology Star Wars: Visions.

== Early life ==
Eunyoung Choi was born in South Korea. Having painted since childhood, her preference in style gradually shifted from realistic painting to impressionism, and later to modern art. She graduated from Yeungnam University in 1998 with a Bachelor of Arts in both fine arts and sculpture. Choi was not initially interested in animation, but after moving to London for postgraduate art studies at Central Saint Martins, began studying character animation. She graduated from Central Saint Martins in 2005, and subsequently moved to Japan to work in the animation industry.

== Career ==
=== Initial collaborations with Masaaki Yuasa ===
After arriving in Japan in 2005, Choi's first job was working as a key animator at the animation studio Gonzo; Choi later said that this was a point of struggle in her career. After learning that director Masaaki Yuasa was setting up a crew for a new television animated series, Kemonozume (2006), at the animation studio Madhouse, Choi submitted her portfolio and was selected to work on the project. Choi's work on Kemonozume as a key animator and episode animation director won praise from fellow animators and fans. Yuasa and Choi continued working together on subsequent projects produced at Madhouse throughout the 2000s, including the animated series Kaiba (2008) and The Tatami Galaxy (2010); independent of Yuasa, Choi also worked on other Madhouse productions, including Casshern Sins (2008–09).

=== Leading Ankama Japan ===
In 2009, Choi became studio director of Ankama Japan, a Japan-based subsidiary of the French entertainment and animation company Ankama. The newly opened studio combined techniques of hand-drawn and digital animation created via Adobe Animate. Ankama Japan relocated 25 European animators to its studio in Tokyo and produced an episode of the company's Wakfu animated series entitled Noximilien the Watchmaker; Choi helmed the episode, while Yuasa served as character designer. In 2011, Ankama closed the Japan studio. However, Choi felt that the ideas of mixing digital and hand-drawn animation techniques, as well as working with a multicultural staff, were important for the Japanese industry to continue. These ideas served as the foundations for her later studio, Science Saru. After the studio was founded, several of Ankama Japan's former members, including Creative Team Director and Flash Animation Chief Abel Góngora, were among the first to join the new company.

=== Foundation of Science Saru ===
Following the closure of Ankama Japan, Choi and Yuasa continued to collaborate. Together, they produced the short animated film Kick-Heart (2013), which was the first large-scale Japanese animated project to be successfully crowdfunded on Kickstarter. During the production of Kick-Heart, Choi proposed establishing a studio with Yuasa; in February 2013, the new company, Science Saru, was established. By the end of 2013, the company had expanded to a staff of five. Choi was instrumental in establishing Science Saru's production methodology (combining hand drawn and digital animation) and recruiting its multicultural staff. The studio's first project was an episode of the American Adventure Time animated series entitled Food Chain (2014). Yuasa directed the episode, while Choi served as creative director. The episode was subsequently nominated for an Annie Award and at Annecy. In 2014, Choi also directed episodes of Yuasa's animated television series Ping Pong the Animation and the Bones television series Space Dandy. She also directed the short promotional mini-series What's Debikuro?, designed to promote the live-action film Miracle: Devil Claus' Love and Magic. The following year saw Choi direct the short music video Song of Four Seasons.

=== Transition to producing ===
As Science Saru increased its number of productions, Choi shifted her focus from animating and directing to producing and managing the studio. By early 2016, the company was ready to undertake its first large-scale project and began production on its first feature film, Lu Over the Wall (2017). The film was produced in less than 16 months using a combination of hand drawn and 'digitally assisted' animation techniques. During production of Lu Over the Wall, Science Saru was approached with the opportunity to produce a second film, the comedy romance The Night Is Short, Walk On Girl (2017). This resulted in the pre-production work on The Night Is Short, Walk On Girl overlapping with the post-production of Lu Over the Wall. Although Lu Over the Wall was completed first, it was released after The Night Is Short, Walk On Girl. Choi served as animation producer on both films, which received immediate critical acclaim. Lu Over the Wall received the Annecy Cristal du long métrage, the Mainichi Film Awards' Ōfuji Noburō Award, and the Japan Media Arts Festival Grand Prize for Animation. The Night is Short, Walk On Girl was awarded the Japan Academy Film Prize for Animation of the Year, the Ottawa International Animation Festival Grand Prize for Best Animated Feature, and has been listed as one of the best Japanese animated films of the decade.

In 2018, Choi served as the animation producer for Science Saru's first animated series, the action/horror Devilman crybaby. Released worldwide by Netflix, the series was an immediate and massive international hit, with 90% of the series' viewers outside of Japan. The series won the Crunchyroll Anime Awards for Anime of the Year and Director of the Year, and was listed as one of the best Japanese animated series of the decade.

In 2019, Choi produced the romance film Ride Your Wave (2019), which received the studio's best reviews to date. The film received nominations from Annecy, the Annie Awards, and the Mainichi Film Awards, and went on to win the Best Animated Feature Film awards at the Shanghai International Film Festival, Fantasia International Film Festival, and Sitges Film Festival. Choi also produced the comedy television series Super Shiro, inspired by the popular Crayon Shin-chan manga and anime franchise.

In 2020, Choi produced two animated series: the comedy television series Keep Your Hands Off Eizouken!, and the Netflix series Japan Sinks: 2020. Keep Your Hands Off Eizouken! won the Japanese Broadcast Critics Association's Galaxy Award for the month of March 2020, received critical acclaim as one of the best Japanese animated series of the season and the year as a whole, and was recognized by The New York Times and The New Yorker as one of the best television series of 2020. The series also won the Crunchyroll Anime Awards for Director of the Year and Best Animation, was awarded the Grand Prize for Television Animation at the Tokyo Anime Awards Festival, and received the Japan Media Arts Festival Grand Prize for Animation. Japan Sinks: 2020 attracted attention for its multiculturalism and inclusiveness, and was named as one of the best anime series of 2020. The first episode of the series was awarded the Annecy Jury Prize for a Television Series, and the series as a whole received two nominations at the Crunchyroll Anime Awards. A film compilation version of Japan Sinks: 2020 was subsequently released in Japanese theaters in November 2020, and was awarded a Jury Selection Prize at the Japan Media Arts Festival; Choi served as animation producer for the film compilation.

On March 25, 2020, Masaaki Yuasa stepped down as president and representative director of Science Saru. Choi subsequently became CEO and president of the studio, and noted that in addition to working with Yuasa on future productions, the studio will look to develop additional projects with other directors.

In 2021, Choi produced a pair of related projects: the feature film Inu-Oh and the animated television series The Heike Story, both based on works by the novelist Hideo Furukawa. Inu-Oh, directed by Yuasa and adapted from Furukawa's novel of the same name, made its world debut at the 78th Venice International Film Festival in September 2021, with a worldwide theatrical release following in August 2022. Inu-Oh received universal critical acclaim, won the Best Animated Feature Film award at the Fantasia International Film Festival, and was nominated for the Golden Globe Award for Best Animated Feature Film. The Heike Story was based on Furukawa's translation of the epic ancient Japanese historical narrative The Tale of the Heike. It premiered on global streaming platforms in September 2021 ahead of its broadcast on Japanese television in January 2022, and was named one of the best series of the year.

Also in 2021, Choi returned to directing and helmed one of nine short films created for Star Wars: Visions, a short film anthology project depicting diverse stories within the Star Wars universe. The short film Choi directed, entitled Akakiri, centered on the story of a princess and a Jedi. In addition to Akakiri, Choi produced another short film that Science Saru contributed to the anthology: T0-B1, directed by Abel Góngora. Both films were released worldwide on September 22, 2021 on Disney+. The anthology as a whole received stellar reviews, with Choi's directorial work attracting praise.

== Works ==
Year	Title	Format	Director	Writer	Producer	Storyboard	Animation Director	Key Animator	Notes
2006	Witchblade	TV series						Yes (episode 2)	
2006	Kemonozume	TV series					Yes (episode 6)	Yes (episodes 1–3, 5, 8; episode 10 avant title)	
2006-07	Tokyo Tribe2	TV series						Yes (episode 6)	
2006-07	Ghost Slayers Ayashi	TV series						Yes (episode 12)	
2008	Kaiba	TV series	Yes (episodes 5, 8)	Yes (episode 5)		Yes (episodes 5, 8)	Yes (episodes 5, 8)	Yes (episodes 5, 8, 11)	
2008-09	Casshern Sins	TV series	Yes (episode 20)			Yes (episode 20)	Yes (episode 20)	Yes (episodes 5, 20, 22, 24)	
2010	Wakfu: Noximilien the Watchmaker	TV Episode	Yes			Yes			
2010	The Tatami Galaxy	TV series	Yes (episode 10)			Yes (episode 10)		Yes (episode 10)	
2013	Kick-Heart	Short Film	Yes (assistant director)					Yes	
2014	Adventure Time: Food Chain	TV Episode	Yes (creative director)		Yes				
2014	Space Dandy	TV series	Yes (episode 9)	Yes (episode 9)				Yes (episode 9)	
2014	Ping Pong The Animation	TV series	Yes (episode 10)					Yes (ending credit sequence)	
2014	What's Debikuro?	Promotional Mini-Series	Yes (episodes 1–3)						
2014–15	Garo: The Animation	TV series	Yes (opening credit sequence 2)			Yes (opening credit sequence 2)			
2015	Song of Four Seasons	Music Video	Yes						
2015	Crayon Shin-chan: My Moving Story! Cactus Large Attack!	Feature Film						Yes (animation assistance)	
2017	The Night Is Short, Walk On Girl	Feature Film			Yes (animation producer)	Yes			
2017	Lu Over the Wall	Feature Film			Yes (animation producer)				
2018	Devilman crybaby	Original Net Animation			Yes (animation producer)				
2019	Ride Your Wave	Feature Film			Yes				
2019–20	Super Shiro	Original Net Animation			Yes				
2020	Keep Your Hands Off Eizouken!	TV series			Yes				
2020	Japan Sinks: 2020	Original Net Animation			Yes				
2020	Japan Sinks: 2020 Theatrical Edition	Compilation Feature Film			Yes (animation producer)				
2021	Inu-Oh	Feature Film			Yes				
2021	The Heike Story	Original Net Animation			Yes (executive producer)				
2021	Star Wars: Visions - Akakiri	Short Film	Yes						
2022	Tatami Time Machine Blues	Original Net Animation			Yes				
2022	Yurei Deco	TV Series			Yes (chief producer)				
2023	Scott Pilgrim Takes Off	Original Net Animation			Yes (executive producer)				
2023	Zom 100: Bucket List of the Dead	TV Series					Yes (episode 9)		
2024	Dandadan	TV Series			Yes				
2024	The Colors Within	Feature Film			Yes (executive producer)				
