= Shinya Ohira =

Japanese animator

Shinya Ohira 大平晋也
- Born: December 12, 1966 (age 59); Nagoya, Aichi, Japan
- Other name: Shinnosuke Harada
- Occupations: Animator, director, character designer
- Years active: 1985–present
- Known for: Akira; FLCL; Spirited Away; Ping Pong The Animation

Shinya Ohira (Japanese: 大平晋也, Hepburn: Ōhira Shin'ya; born December 12, 1966) is a Japanese animator, director and character designer. He is known for his animation style with constantly shifting linework, described as being both realistic and surreal. He is part of the animator circle Studio Break, along with animators like Atsushi Yano and Shinji Hashimoto. He has worked on several Studio Ghibli films, with Hayao Miyazaki even storyboarding certain scenes with Ohira in mind for the animation.

== Career ==
After graduating school, Ohira decided to start working as animator due to family circumstances making it difficult for him to pursue higher education. He joined Studio Pierrot after seeing an opening for work in the magazine Animage. 8 months later, he was promoted to key animator and Ninja Senshi Tobikage (1985) was his first work as Key animator.

After leaving Pierrot he worked as a freelancer on various mecha anime by studios AIC and Ashi Productions. Ohira describes his work on the AIC anime Gall Force (1987) as a turning point for his animation style, when he started experimenting with full animation.

When he learned that the manga Akira would be turned into an animated film, he brought some his work to director Katsuhiro Otomo so that he could work on the movie. He drew parts of the elevator scene, as well as parts of the iconic explosion scene. His work on the film would influence his style towards realistic animation.

Ohira's first work on a Studio Ghibli movie was on Only Yesterday (1991). Subsequently, he received a handwritten letter from Hayao Miyazaki asking him if he would work on the movie Porco Rosso (1992). He would go on to become a frequent collaborator with Miyazaki on his films.

He worked as director on Episode 4 of The Hakkenden: A New Saga (Hakkenden Shin Sou) (1994) "Hamaji's Resurrection". Impressed by animator Masaaki Yuasa's work on Crayon Shin-chan, he invited him to work on the episode. Yuasa ended up working as Ohira's partner, helping him with layouts, key animation and animation direction. The production of the episode went beyond the planned schedule, with layouts taking 4 months and 2 months for corrections. The episode featured constantly moving characters, in contrast to the limited animation seen in commercial anime. In-spite of a lack of visual coherence, the episode was well received and provoked a lot of conversation within the industry. Ohira would later work on several of Yuasa's anime such as Ping pong The Animation and Lu Over the Wall.

After The Hakkenden, Ohira would briefly retire from animation, returning to his hometown of Nagoya and taking over his parents' sewing factory business. However he was convinced by animator Norimoto Tokura to return to the anime industry.

In Spirited Away (2001), he animated the scene where the main character Chihiro meets the spider man Kamaji. Ohira's animation is described as being "looser and weirder" in comparison with the previous scene, his style serving to convey the character's suspense and hesitation.

He worked on the episode "Kid's story" directed by Shinichirō Watanabe from the anthology The Animatrix (2003). His work in the episode is described as resembling "unfinished pencil sketches", his style emphasizing "the materiality of Kid's world and the status of his body as a drawn construct".

He participated in the climax of the "Wano arc'" in episode 1072 of One piece, animating a scene of the main character Monkey D. Luffy's "Gear 5" power up along with animator Akihiro Ota.

Ohira was one of the first animators to join the production of The Boy and the Heron (2023). He animated the scene at the beginning of the film, where the main character Mahito runs through a fire. Reviewers described the scene as "feverish and desperate", "frenzied and fluid" and "bone chilling". Joshua Fox of Screen Rant called it "one of the best scenes to ever appear in a Studio Ghibli film".

== Style ==
Shinya Ohira's animation style features exaggerated motion and constantly shifting line work. His style has been described as "expressionist". Ohira has stated that the way he draws is free of logic and restrictions. Director Masaaki Yuasa referred to Ohira as "one of those masters capable of not only rendering beautifully realistic drawings, but also of imbuing animation with a sense of freedom". He is an experimental animator who sometimes draws key animation with color pencils and crayons. He prefers to express his individuality, even ignoring the storyboard. This mentality has gotten Ohira banned from some productions, but he also believes that it is what brought him to where he is today.

Ohira's style has evolved significantly over the years. Originally a mecha animator, he was influenced by the work of animator Masahito Yamashita to use black paint in his animation. After leaving studio Pierrot, he worked on various OVAs which were less restrictive than TV anime, allowing Ohira to develop his special style. He would experiment with fluid effects animation, such as on the anime Gall Force, which featured 300 drawings for just 5 seconds of animation. His work with several well-known realist animators in Akira would then influence him to pursue more realistic animation, such as his work in Only Yesterday. His work on The Hakkenden is described as "a type of realism different from Ghibli". The Hakkenden would also feature the first instance of Ohira's loose and constantly deforming animation style, which he would solidify in the 2000s with his work on titles like The Animatrix: Kids story, Kill Bill: Volume 1, Windy Tales and Mind Game.

Due to his tendency to stray away from model sheet and style that "defies assimilation" his work is often corrected by animation directors to be more visually coherent, sometimes to the point of losing his characteristic style. His animation featuring chaotic movement in the movie Lu Over the Wall was heavily altered to work with Flash, which drew criticism. His work on the anime Pluto was post processed with digital effects. While his work in Spirited Away was corrected to be visually consistent with the rest of the film, his scene in The Boy and the Heron was left uncorrected and appears in the film exactly as he drew it.

== Works ==
=== Animated television series ===
- Star Musketeer Bismarck (1984-1985) In-between animation
- Ninja Senshi Tobikage (1985-1986) In-between animation, Key animation
- Machine Robo: Revenge of Cronos (1986-1987) Key animation
- Mobile Suit Gundam ΖΖ (1986-1987) Key animation
- Around the World in 80 Days (1987-1988) Key animation
- Peter Pan and Wendy (1989) Key animation
- Momotaro Densetsu PEACHBOY LEGEND (1989-1990) Opening Animation, Key animation / Transformation Bank
- City Hunter 3 (1989-1990) Opening animation, Key animation
- Sci-Fi Harry (2000-2001) Opening animation (as Shinnosuke Harada)
- WIndy Tales (2004-2005) Key animation
- Ping Pong THE ANIMATION (2014) Opening animation, Storyboard, Animation director, Key animation
- Space Dandy (2014) Key animation
- Lupin III Part IV (2015) Key animation
- ONE PIECE (1999-) Key animation
- Pluto (2023) Key animation

=== Animated films ===
- Bats & Terry (1987) Key animation
- Mobile Suit Gundam: Char's Counterattack (1988) Key animation
- AKIRA (1988) Key animation
- Utsunomiko (1989) Key animation
- Only Yesterday (1991) Key animation
- Porco Rosso (1992) Key animation
- Junkers Come Here (Pilot) (1995) Character design, Animation director, Key animation
- Junkers Come Here (1995) Ending
- SPRIGGAN (1998) Key animation (uncredited)
- My Neighbors the Yamadas (1999) Key animation
- Spirited Away (2001) Key animation
- Ghiblies Episode 2 (2002) Key animation
- The ANIMATRIX "Kid's Story" (2003) Key animation
- Mind Game (2004) Key animation (uncredited)
- Ghost in the Shell: Innocence (2004) Key animation
- Howl's Moving Castle (2004) Key animation
- Portable Airport (2004) Key animation
- Space station No.9 (2005) Key animation
- Prince of Tennis: The First Game (2005) Key animation
- Tsubasa Reservoir Chronicle the Movie: The Princess in the Birdcage Kingdom (2005) Key animation
- xxxHOLiC the Movie: Midsummer Night Dream (2005) Key animation
- Tekkonkinkreet (2006) Key animation
- Genius Party Beyond "Wanwa" (2008) Director, Storyboard, Character Design, Animation Director, Key animator
- REDLINE (2010) Key animation
- A Letter to Momo (2012) Key animation
- Rainbow Fireflies (2012) Key animation
- Berserk: The Golden Age III: Advent (2013) Storyboard (co-)
- The Wind Rises (2013) Key animation
- Giovanni's Island (2014) Key animation
- The Last: Naruto the Movie (2014) Key animation
- The Night Is Short, Walk On Girl (2017) Storyboard
- Mary and the Witch's Flower (2017) Key animation
- Lu Over the Wall (2017) Key animation
- Batman Ninja (2018) Key animation (under the name of Shinnosuke Harada)
- The Boy and the Heron (2023) Key animation

=== Live-action films ===
- Kill Bill: Volume 1 (2003) Key animator (Animation Part)
- The World of Kanako (2014) Animation director, Storyboard

=== OVA ===
- Armored Gallian Part III Iron Emblem (1986) Key animation (uncredited)
- Ai City (1986) Key animation
- Megazone 23 Part II (1986) Key animation
- GALL FORCE 2 DESTRUCTION (1987) Key animation
- Bubblegum Crisis (1987) Key animation
- Gakuen Special Search Hikaru On (1987) Key animation
- Blackmagic M-66 (1987) Key animation
- GOD BLESS DANCOUGA (1987) Key animation
- Dragon's Heaven (1988) Key animation
- Project A-Ko 3: Cinderella Rhapsody (1988) Key animator (uncredited)
- Riding Bean (1989) Key animation
- Gosenzo-sama Banbanzai! (1989) Key animator
- Angel Cop (1989) Key animation
- Mobile Suit Gundam 0080: War in the Pocket (1989) Effect settings, original publicity video "ALL THAT GUNDAM"
- Peacock King 2 Phantom Castle (1989) Key animation
- The Hakkenden (1990) Animation Director (Co-)
- Project A-ko: Gray Side/Blue Side (1990) Key animation (uncredited)
- Violence Jack Hellwind (1990) Key animation
- Yume Pillow (1991) Director, Script, Storyboard, Character design, Animation Director
- The Hakkenden – A New Saga – Episode 4 "Hamaji's Resurrection" (1994) Director, Storyboard, Key animator
- Blue Submarine No. 6 (1998-2000) Key animation (uncredited)
- FLCL (1999) Key animation
- Slime Bōkenki (1999) Key animation
- JoJo's Bizarre Adventure (2000-2002) Key animation (under the name of Shinnosuke Harada)
- Kage (2004) Art setting and original art (under the name of Shinnosuke Harada)

=== Web animation ===
- Japan Animator Expo "20min Walk From Nishi-Ogikubo Station, 2 Bedrooms, Living Room, Dining Room, Kitchen, 2mos Deposit, No Pets Allowed" (2014) Key animation
- Blade Runner Blackout 2022 (2017) Key animation

=== Games ===
- Captain Power Training Video (1988) Animation Director (Co-Production)
- Blood: The Last Vampire (2000) Key animation
- Tales of the Abyss (2005) Event animation
- Asura's Wrath Episode 11.5 "Forging ahead" (2012) Director, Character design, Storyboard, Animation Director

== In popular culture ==
In the first episode of Keep Your Hands Off Eizouken!, the character Tsubame rushes home to watch a fictional anime by "the dream team, Inoue-san, Iso-san and Ohira-san" referring to Toshiyuki Inoue, Mitsuo Iso and Shinya Ohira.
