= Inu-Oh =

2021 Japanese animated film by Masaaki Yuasa

- Theatrical release poster
- Directed by: Masaaki Yuasa
- Written by: Akiko Nogi
- Based on: Tales of the Heike: Inu-Oh by Hideo Furukawa
- Produced by: Eunyoung Choi; Fumie Takeuchi; Akiko Yodo
- Starring: Avu-chan; Mirai Moriyama
- Cinematography: Yoshihiro Sekiya
- Edited by: Kiyoshi Hirose
- Music by: Yoshihide Otomo
- Production company: Science Saru
- Distributed by: Asmik Ace; Aniplex
- Release dates: September 9, 2021 (Venice); May 28, 2022 (Japan)
- Running time: 98 minutes
- Country: Japan
- Language: Japanese
- Box office: $434,332

Inu-Oh (Japanese: 犬王), lit. Dog King is a 2021 Japanese animated musical film directed by Masaaki Yuasa and produced by Science Saru. Based upon the novel Tales of the Heike: Inu-Oh by Hideo Furukawa, the film is set in 14th century Japan and centers on the friendship between Inu-Oh, a dancer born with unique physical characteristics, and Tomona, a blind musician. Ostracized by society due to their physical differences, Inu-Oh and Tomona nonetheless utilize their artistic abilities to propel themselves to stardom.

Inu-Oh premiered at the 78th Venice International Film Festival in September 2021, with the film releasing in Japan in May 2022.

== Plot ==
A withered biwa player narrates a tale of how 900 years ago, the Genji clan sought the Imperial Regalia to unite the emperor's throne. They defeat the rival Heike clan at the Battle of Dan-no-ura, wherein the child emperor drowns while carrying the Kusanagi-no-Tsurugi, the legendary Japanese sword. Three hundred years later, agents of Ashikaga Yoshimitsu hire young Tomona and his father to retrieve a box from a Heike shipwreck. They find a sword inside the box. Not realizing that it is Kusanagi-no-Tsurugi, Tomona's father unsheathes the sword, letting loose a blade of energy that cuts him in half and blinds Tomona. Tomona then goes on a years long journey to find answers for what happened, with the ghost of his father accompanying him. He meets a member of a whole troupe of blind biwa players, and decides to learn the biwa and join the troupe. Tomona changes his name to "Tomoichi", but the name change makes it difficult for his father's spirit to find him.

At the same time, a Noh dance troupe leader dons a demonic mask. A series of murders of biwa players follow, and then the leader's third son is born with three stubby limbs, a very elongated right arm, skin covered in scales, and a hideously deformed face. The troupe leader has such contempt for his deformed son that he forces him to always wear a mask and treats him like a dog. But one day, the deformed son sees his father try to teach Noh dancing to his other sons. The deformed son practices along with them, and his dance magically restores his legs.

The deformed son wanders the village and soon meets Tomoichi. He bonds with Tomoichi as he can't see his deformity, and so he reveals to him that he has chosen the name "Inu-Oh" (lit. "Dog King") for himself. Tomoichi tells Inu-Oh about how he can see his father's spirit, and he then notices that many spirits of Heike warriors surround Inu-Oh, telling him their stories. This vision inspires the two to form a new performing troupe, with Tomoichi now renaming himself "Tomoari".

Soon after, a long-haired Tomoari debuts the new act on a bridge, performing his song in a style resembling modern hair metal. Below the bridge, Inu-Oh dances to the music, telling a story of how the Heike soldiers clung on to their ship in retreat but had all their arms cut off. At the end of the song, both of Inu-Oh's arms change to normal length. Their act is an instant hit, and Tomoari and Inu-Oh become huge celebrities.

In their next performance, about the Heike warriors waiting for a "whale that never arrived", the scales on Inu-Oh's skin disappear. But the new troupe arouses the attention of Ashikaga, who only wants his clan's version of the Heike stories told. He sends agents to Inu-Oh's now envious father, offering fame if he sabotages his son's act.

The troupe's next act reveals the truth behind Inu-Oh's origin: his father made a deal with the demon mask for fame. The demon mask demanded the lives of biwa players, and the innocence of his unborn son. The murders that followed released the spirits of Heike soldiers that followed the players, but the spirits flocked to Inu-Oh instead of his father, helping him win fame and undoing his curse. His father demands the mask kill Inu-Oh, violating the terms of their original agreement. Outraged, the mask kills Inu-Oh's father instead.

At the end of the performance, Inu-Oh's face is restored. However, Ashikaga cracks down on the troupe, forcing Tomoari to stop playing. Ashikaga himself demands that Inu-Oh perform only the official version of Heike history, or else he will behead Tomoari. Inu-Oh concedes, but Tomoari continues to perform and speak out against the Ashikaga clan, so the clan's men behead him. Inu-Oh goes on to more years of fame as a Noh dancer, but he is forgotten after his death.

The narrator turns out to be Tomoari's spirit, who has remained on Earth up to modern times, and now uses his original name "Tomona". Inu-Oh's spirit appears, explaining that it took 600 years to find Tomona since he changed his name. Inu-Oh restores Tomona to his youthful form, and reverts to his deformed version. The two then perform again.

== Characters ==
Inu-Oh (犬王; lit. 'Dog King')
Voiced by: Avu-chan (Japanese); Joshua Waters, Holden Thomas (English)
The titular character and co-protagonist of the film, Inu-Oh is an outcast whose body is always covered with clothing designed to hide his appearance; even his face is perpetually masked. Inu-Oh's character is based upon a real noh performer of the same name, though little is known about him aside from legends. While developing his novel about Inu-Oh, which served as the basis for the film, writer Hideo Furukawa expanded upon these legends to re-imagine the historical Inu-Oh as a performer who subverts societal prejudice to become a cultural icon.
Tomona (友魚; lit. 'Friend Fish')
Voiced by: Mirai Moriyama (Japanese); Sena Bryer, Carter Young (Young), Jonathan Leon (Teen) (English)
The co-protagonist of the film alongside Inu-Oh, Tomona is a blind musician who plays the biwa, an instrument used to accompany the telling of tales. Following the conclusion of the Genpei War, it was common for biwa players to recite The Tale of the Heike, a historical account of the conflict which mourned the fallen and valorized the losing Heike clan in order to pacify their spirits.
Ashikaga Yoshimitsu (足利義満)
Voiced by: Tasuku Emoto (Japanese); Cory Yee (English)
Inu-Oh's father (犬王の父)
Voiced by: Kenjiro Tsuda (Japanese); Jason Marnocha (English)
Tomona's father (友魚の父)
Voiced by: Yutaka Matsushige (Japanese); Keythe Farley (English)
Hino Nariko
Voiced by: Misato Matsuoka (Japanese); Suzie Yeung (English)
Heike spirit (平家の亡霊)
Voiced by: Otomo Yoshihide

== Production ==
Hideo Furukawa's novel Tales of the Heike: INU-OH was published in Japan in 2017. In adapting this story about ancient times, director Masaaki Yuasa described the film as a tale with parallels and relevance to the modern day, a story which asks "whether to align with fate and fashion to seize glory, or to forgo reward to live according to your beliefs." The film was scored by composer and multi-instrumentalist Otomo Yoshihide. The soundtrack to the film was released on May 25, and features original songs performed in character by Avu-chan and Moriyama, as well as instrumental interstitial music performed by Otomo. The original songs were written by Avu-chan, Otomo, director Masaaki Yuasa and soundtrack musician Yohei Matsui. Character designs were created by manga author, Taiyō Matsumoto.

== Release ==
Inu-Oh had its world premiere at the Venice International Film Festival on September 9, 2021. The film was the first Japanese hand-drawn animated film to screen in competition in the festival's Horizons category. The film subsequently screened at the 2021 Toronto International Film Festival, where it made its North American debut. Inu-Oh held its Japanese premiere at the Tokyo International Film Festival on November 3, 2021. The film received a wide theatrical release in Japan in May 28, 2022, with Asmik Ace and Aniplex serving as co-distributors.

In North America, the film has been licensed for theatrical and home-video distribution by GKIDS, with theatrical exhibition set to begin August 12, 2022 while Anime Limited has licensed distribution in the United Kingdom, Ireland, France, Belgium, the Netherlands and Luxembourg. The film is slated to receive a theatrical release in the UK in the summer of 2022. Outside of these territories and Asia, sales agency Fortissimo Films has acquired international rights and will represent the film to distributors.

== Reception ==
=== Critical reception ===
Upon its premiere at the Venice International Film Festival, Inu-Oh received immediate critical acclaim. On review aggregator Rotten Tomatoes, the film holds a 91% based on 57 reviews, with an average rating of 7.7/10. The site's critical consensus reads: "Masaaki Yuasa fans will come to Inu-Oh expecting a visual feast – and this musical animated extravaganza won't leave them disappointed." On Metacritic, which assigns a weighted average score out of 100 to reviews from mainstream critics, the film received an average score of 77 out of 100 based on 16 reviews, indicating "generally favorable reviews".

William Bibbiani of TheWrap noted that "Inu-Oh is a story about using art to speak truth to power... It's a story about why some stories go untold, and why some people tell them anyway, no matter what the cost," and praised the film as "a siren scream of a musical: angry and beautiful, rapturously animated and highly infectious." Writing for IndieWire, David Ehrlich rated the film a B+, highlighted the film's "affection for the marginalized and misunderstood," and noted that "not since 1973's Belladonna of Sadness has an anime feature reimagined ancient history in such hypnotically psychedelic fashion." Wendy Ide of Screen Daily called the work a "singular piece of filmmaking" with "an originality of approach which should set it apart within the anime landscape."

=== Accolades ===
Year	Award	Category	Recipient	Result	Ref.
2021	Bucheon International Animation Festival	International Competition: Feature Film – Special Distinction Prize	Inu-Oh	Won	
2022	Fantasia International Film Festival	The Satoshi Kon Award for Best Animated Feature	Inu-Oh	Won	
2022	Satellite Awards	Best Motion Picture – Animated or Mixed Media	Inu-Oh	Nominated	
2022	Florida Film Critics Circle	Best Animated Film	Inu-Oh	Nominated	
2023	Golden Globe Awards	Best Animated Feature Film	Inu-Oh	Nominated	
2023	Annie Awards	Best Indie Feature	Inu-Oh	Nominated	
2023	Annie Awards	Best Writing – Feature	Akiko Nogi	Nominated	
2023	Mainichi Film Awards	Best Animation Film	Inu-Oh	Nominated	
2023	Mainichi Film Awards	Ōfuji Noburō Award	Inu-Oh	Won	
2023	Crunchyroll Anime Awards	Best Film	Inu-Oh	Nominated	
2023	Japan Academy Film Prize	Animation of the Year	Inu-Oh	Nominated	
