= Tadanari Okamoto =

Japanese anime director (1932–1990)

- Born: January 11, 1932; Toyonaka, Osaka, Japan
- Died: February 16, 1990 (aged 58)
- Occupation: Director of animated films
- Years active: 1965–1990

Tadanari Okamoto (岡本 忠成, Okamoto Tadanari; January 11, 1932 – February 16, 1990) was a Japanese independent animator. From 1965 until his death he completed at least 37 short subject films in a wide variety of mediums, many of them winning award-winning, his honorific nicknamed "Sheldon Cohen and Hans Fischerkoesen of Japan".

== Career and legacy ==
Eight of his films have been awarded the Ōfuji Noburō Award at the Mainichi Film Awards (more than any other director in the history of the prize) and his films have altogether earned at least 24 other awards internationally. His work is also the subject a two-hour-long documentary The Magic Ballet, released in 1990, and in 2003 four of his films placed in a list of the best 150 animated films and series as voted for by practitioners and critics of animation from around the world in a survey commissioned by Tokyo's Laputa Animation Festival: most notably with The Magic Fox (おこんじょうるり, Okon Jōruri; literally "The Ballad Drama of Okon", 1982), which came twenty-eighth.

After working at MOM Productions, known for its stop motion work for Rankin/Bass, he founded his own production company, Echo Incorporated, in 1964, and soon after made a trip to visit Czech animator and director Břetislav Pojar. One of his last films, "Metropolitan Museum" (メトロポリタンミュージアム, Metoroporitanmyūjiamu; 1984), was commissioned and broadcast across the nation by NHK, the national public broadcasting organization of Japan, as one of their Minna no Uta interstitial programs. He died during the production of The Restaurant of Many Orders (注文の多い料理店, Chūmon no Ōi Ryōriten; also known as "A Well-ordered Restaurant"), an adaptation of the Kenji Miyazawa story of the same name for which he enlisted the talents of Reiko Okuyama, a former Tōei Dōga animator and animation director who had for many years abandoned animation in favour of illustration, including copperplate engraving, to aid in realising the engraving-inspired visual style envisioned for the film. Posthumously completed under the supervision of Kihachirō Kawamoto, it débuted in 1991 and was awarded with, amongst others, that year's Ōfuji Noburō and Minister of Education prizes (the latter being an NHK Japan Prize for achievement in an audiovisual work relevant to primary education) and prompted a special lifetime achievement Mainichi Film Award for Okamoto.

== Home media ==
A selection of Okamoto's films was released on Laserdisc on August 24, 1986, and re-released on September 25, 1994. A more complete collection was released across three DVD-Video discs on June 24, 2009: these were available separately or as a box set, exclusive to which there was a fourth disc of additional materials such as university and advertising work.

== Filmography ==
- Fushigi na Kusuri (ふしぎなくすり, The Mysterious Medicine, 1965)
- Kitsutsuki Keikaku (キツツキ計画, The Woodpecker Plan, 1966)
- Hana to Mogura (花ともぐら, 1970)
- 12-gatsu no uta (12月のうた, December Song, 1971)
- Chikotan (チコタン, 1971)
- Nanmu Ichibyō Sokusai (南無一病息災, 1973)
- Mizu no Tane (水のたね, 1975)
- Frypan Jiisan (ふらいぱんじいさん, 1981)
- Metropolitan Museum (メトロポリタンミュージアム, 1984)
- Chūmon no Ōi Ryōriten (注文の多い料理店, The Restaurant of Many Orders, 1991), based on Kenji Miyazawa

== See also ==
- Tadahito Mochinaga
- Nihon University
- Karel Zeman
