= Bakudan Johnny =

Japanese rock band

Bakudan Johnny 爆弾ジョニー
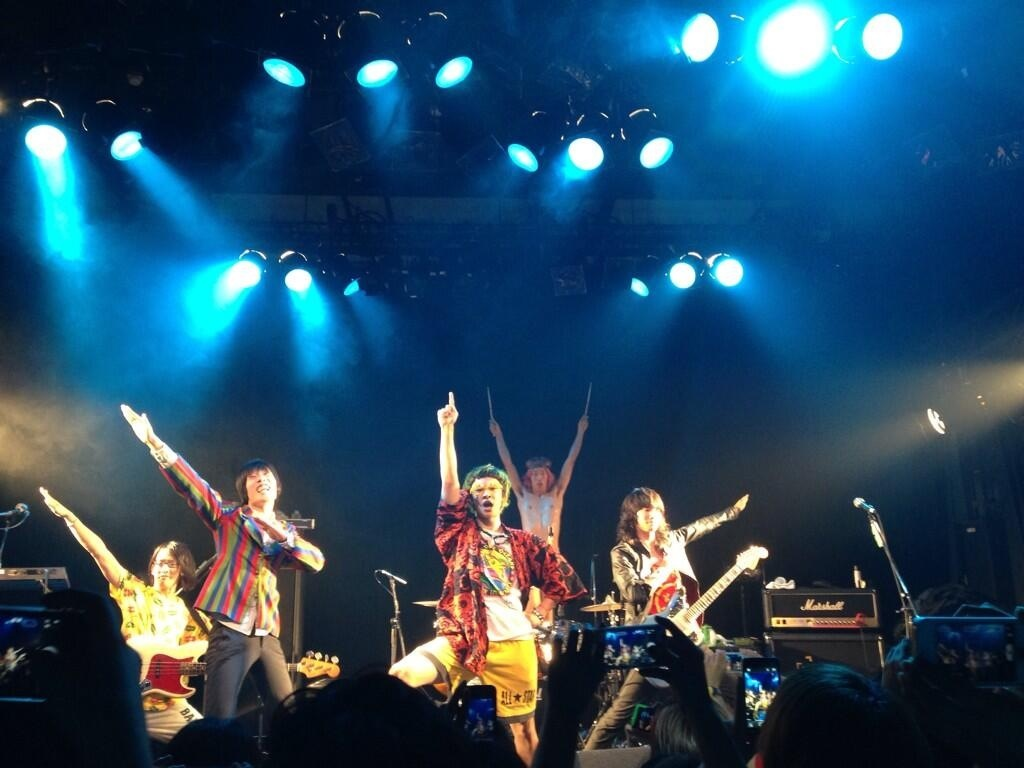

Background information
- Origin: Hokkaido, Japan
- Genres: J-pop, indie pop, pop rock, alternative rock
- Years active: 2010–2022
- Label: Ki/oon Music. (2013–present)
- Members: Ryome (vocals, guitar); Kyosuke (guitar, chorus); Romantic Yasuda (keyboard, chorus); Kobori Fire (bass, scream); Taichi Thunder (drums, scream)
- Website: bakudanjohnny.amebaownd.com

Bakudan Johnny (爆弾ジョニー) was a Japanese rock band formed in Hokkaido in 2010. The band consisted of five members: Ryome, Kyosuke, Romantic Yasuda, Kobori Fire and Taichi Thunder. The band disbanded in October 2022.

== History ==
=== 2011-2013 ===
The five members formed Bakudan Johnny in high school. During the summer break of their last year in high school, they went on a nationwide tour with fellow Hokkaido band, Drop's.

=== 2014 ===
Bakudan Johnny made their major debut on April 23 with the album, はじめての爆弾ジョニー(Hajimete no Bakudan Johnny). Two tie-ups further increased the band's recognition around the nation. The first was 唯一人 (Tada Hitori), which was released on June 4 and used as the theme song for the anime, Ping Pong. The second tie-up was with the movie, Hibi Rock. Bakudan Johnny's single, 終わりなき午後の冒険者(Owarinaki Gogo no Boukensha), was chosen as the theme song for this comedy

== Discography ==
=== Singles ===
Release date	Title	Tracks	Peak chart position
June 4, 2014	唯一人 (Tada Hitori)	1. 唯一人 (Tada Hitori); 2. P.P.P (Power to the Party People)	28
October 22, 2014	終わりなき午後の冒険者(Owarinaki Gogo no Boukensha)	1. 終わりなき午後の冒険者(Owarinaki Gogo no Boukensha); 2. Super KOBORI.; 3. アッチ向いて☆恋っ! (Acchi Muite Koi!); 4. Secret Track	73

=== Albums ===
Release date	Title	Tracks	Album details	Peak chart position
April 23, 2014	はじめての爆弾ジョニー (Hajimete no Bakudan Johnny	1. Intro; 2. なあ～んにも (Naa〜nnimo); 3. おかしな2人 (Okashi na Futari); 4. 男の子 (Otoko no Ko); 5. 真夜中の××× (Mayonaka no xxx); 6. ダイナマイトラヴ (Dynamite Love); 7. へんしん (Henshin); 8. キミハキミドリ (Kimi ha Kimidori); 9. 青空ベイビー (Aozora Baby); 10. イミナシ！ (Iminashi!); 11. うたかたの日々 (Utakata no Hibi); 12. 賛歌 (Sanka); 13. かなしみのない場所へ (Kanashimi no nai Basho he); 14. ギャルがゲル暮らし ～遊牧民～(Gal ga Gel Gurashi ～Yuubokumin～)	-	34
October 22, 2014	Owarinaki Gogo No Boukensya	-	-	-
December 3, 2014	みんなの幸せ (Minna no Shiawase)	1. KNOCK; 2. ◎△$♪×¥●&%#？！; 3. 唯一人 (Tada Hitori) Album Mix); 4. 電車/ROCK (Densha/ROCK); 5. ZENSOKU SWAN ～走れスワン～ (ZENSOKU SWAN ～Hashire Swan～); 6. 柑橘サンバ (Kankitsu Sanba); 7. いたいけBOY♂イケナイGIRL♀(Itaike BOY♂ Ikenai GIRL♀); 8. 冷奴 (Hiyayakko); 9. P.P.P (Power to the Party People); 10. 終わりなき午後の冒険者 (Owarinaki Gogo no Boukensha); 11. さすらい (Sasurai); 12. ステキ世界 (Suteki Sekai); 13. みんなの幸せ(Minna no Shiawase); 14. ぼくらの (Bokura no)	3.唯一人 (Tada Hitori) was used as the theme song for the anime, Ping Pong, and 10.終わりなき午後の冒険者 (Owarinaki Gogo no Boukensha) was used as the theme song for the movie 日々ロック (Hibi Rock).	62
February 22, 2017	Live to BAKUDANIUS	-	-	-
July 17, 2017	BAKUDANIUS	-	-	-
November 22, 2017	Crazy Beat Lariat	-	-	-
September 23, 2020	ホープ (H1OPE)	-	-	-
