= Masaaki Yuasa =

Japanese anime director and writer (born 1965)

Masaaki Yuasa 湯浅 政明
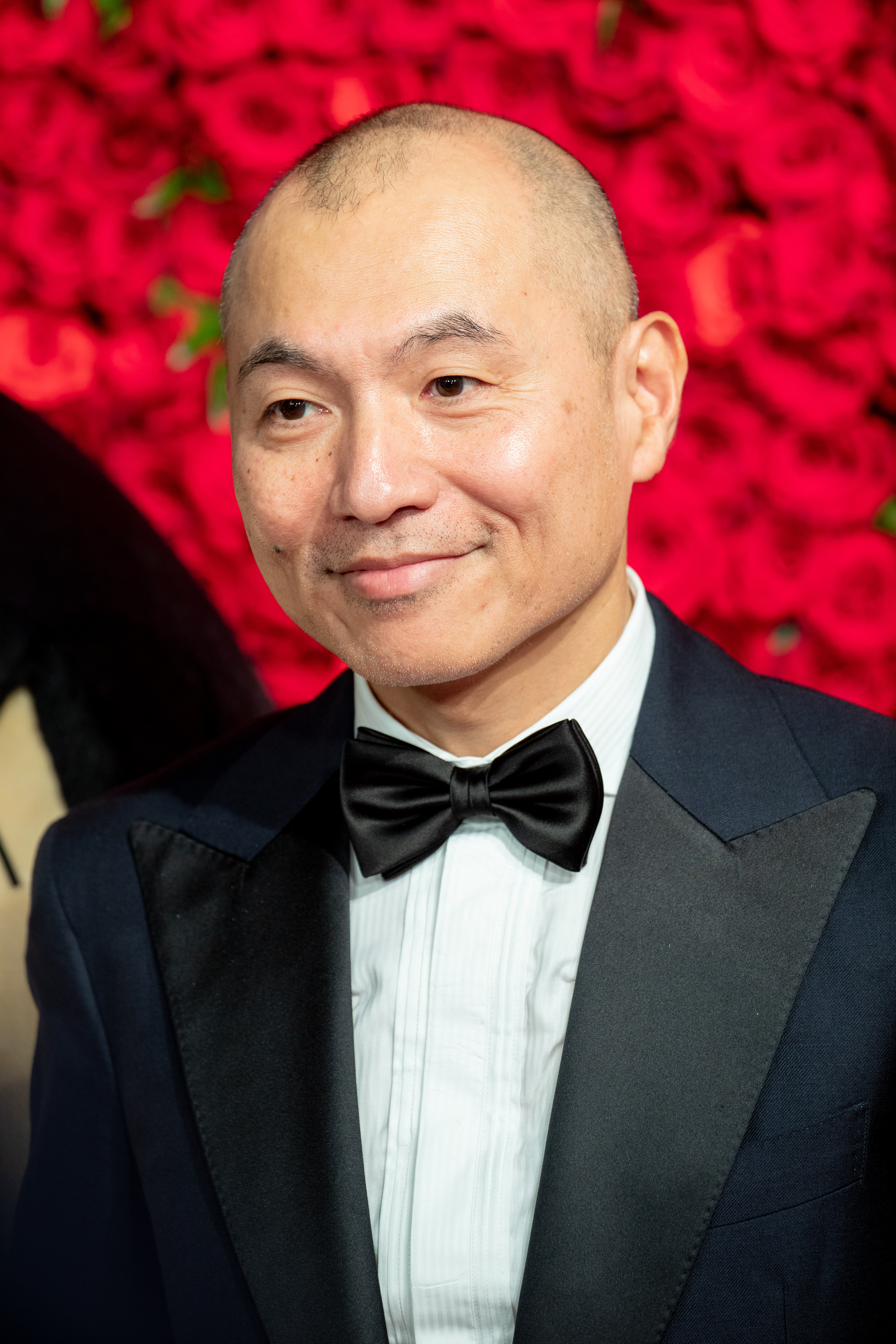
- Yuasa at the 30th Tokyo International Film Festival (2018)
- Born: March 16, 1965 (age 61); Fukuoka, Japan
- Education: Kyushu Sangyo University
- Occupations: Film director; screenwriter; animator
- Years active: 1987–present
- Employers: Freelance affiliated with Ajiado (1987–1994); Freelance (1994–2013); President of Science Saru (2013–2020); Freelance (2020–2025); CEO of ame pippin (2025–present)

Masaaki Yuasa (湯浅 政明, Yuasa Masaaki; born March 16, 1965) is a Japanese director, screenwriter, and animator. He is the former president of Science Saru, a Japanese animation studio which he co-founded with producer Eunyoung Choi in 2013. Yuasa previously served as president of Science Saru, but stepped down from this role in 2020. In 2025, he founded the studio ame pippin. Recognized for his idiosyncratic art style and directorial voice, Yuasa began his career as an animator on the landmark television series Chibi Maruko-chan (1990–1992) and Crayon Shin-chan (1992–present), before moving into directing with the feature film Mind Game (2004) and developing a cult appeal following.

Yuasa spent much of the 2000s and early 2010s working in television directing, helming a trio of series, Kemonozume (2006), Kaiba (2008), and The Tatami Galaxy (2010), before releasing the crowdfunded short film Kick-Heart (2013). During the production of Kick-Heart, Choi proposed the establishment of Science Saru, and the resultant works created at the studio, combined with increased international distribution, led to mainstream breakout successes in the 2010s and saw Yuasa rise to prominence as one of Japan's foremost independent creators. At Science Saru, Yuasa focused on directing both television and feature film productions, starting with an episode of the American animated series Adventure Time (2014), and continuing with Ping Pong the Animation (2014), The Night Is Short, Walk On Girl (2017), Lu Over the Wall (2017), Devilman Crybaby (2018), Ride Your Wave (2019), Super Shiro (2019), Keep Your Hands Off Eizouken! (2020), Japan Sinks: 2020 (2020), and Inu-Oh (2021).

Yuasa's productions have won international critical acclaim, receiving awards from Annecy, the Japan Academy Film Prize, the Mainichi Film Awards, and the Japan Media Arts Festival. In recognition of his collective career accomplishments, he has been recognized by the Japanese government and received the Medal of Honor with Purple Ribbon, as well as the Agency for Cultural Affairs' Cabinet Minister Award for Media Fine Arts.

Yuasa's latest project is the musical drama feature film Inu-Oh, which premiered at the Venice International Film Festival in September 2021 and was released worldwide in August 2022. It was his first film nominated for a Golden Globe.

== Early life ==
Yuasa was born on March 16, 1965, in Fukuoka, Japan. As a child, Yuasa liked animation, and as early as his kindergarten years found he could entertain classmates with his drawings. When Yuasa was in his first year of junior high school and thinking it was time to move away from anime and manga, Space Battleship Yamato The Movie was released in 1977, triggering a huge anime boom in Japan, followed in 1979 by the simultaneous release of Hayao Miyazaki's Lupin III: The Castle of Cagliostro, Osamu Dezaki's Aim for the Ace! The Movie and Rintaro's Galaxy Express 999 The Movie and several other films. He decided to pursue a career in the manga/anime industry, encouraged by public opinion (whether it was true or not), including newspaper and television reports that Japanese animation can withstand adult viewing. He had no idea about the animation industry and initially thought about becoming a manga artist. However, when he saw animators being treated like stars as creators in a succession of new animation magazines, he decided he wanted to become an animator. He then studied design in high school and majored in oil painting at the art department of Kyushu Sangyo University. During his college years, Yuasa worried he would not be able to make a living as an animator, but continued to study television animation as it aired and familiarize himself with animators whose personal styles resonated with him.

=== Influences ===
In his youth, Yuasa was initially drawn to the animated television series Mazinger Z (1972–1974) and Space Battleship Yamato (1974–1975). A crucial influence which led Yuasa to work in the industry was Hayao Miyazaki's landmark feature film debut Lupin III: The Castle of Cagliostro (1979). In the 1980s, Yuasa began to focus on the study of individual animators, namely Takashi Nakamura and his work on Golden Warrior Gold Lightan (1981–1982). He also studied international animation, with particular influences being the works of Tex Avery, the British film Yellow Submarine (1968), The King and the Mockingbird (1980) by French filmmaker Paul Grimault, and Glen Keane's animation work on the climactic fight sequence in The Fox and the Hound (1981). Some of his other favorite animations include Unico in the Island of Magic (1983), Wicked City (1987), Aim for the Ace! (1979), Galaxy Express 999 (1979), Mazinger Z vs. The Great General of Darkness (1974), Fantastic Planet (1973), Pinocchio (1940), Sing (2016), Night on the Galactic Railroad (1985), How to Train Your Dragon (2010), The Wrong Trousers (1994), Gamba no Bouken (1972), Future Boy Conan (1978), Tensai Bakabon (1970), Lupin the 3rd Part I: The Classic Adventures (1971–1972), Tom and Jerry, Heidi, Girl of the Alps (1974), Doraemon: Nobita's Great Adventure into the Underworld (1984), The Man Who Planted Trees (1987), Hedgehog in the Fog (1975), 3000 Leagues in Search of Mother (1976), Anne of Green Gables (1979), The Gutsy Frog (1972–1974), Doraemon: The Records of Nobita, Spaceblazer (1981), Kumo to Tulip (1943), and The Animal Neighborhood Community (1941). Outside of animation, Yuasa was also influenced by the art of Salvador Dalí.

Yuasa described his process of inspiration:

I get inspired with a lot of things I see, hear, smell, and touch in everyday life... I often derive inspiration even from really modest visuals; a commercial, a cut from a movie, a movement from an anime as well as nameless flowers and grasses blooming on the road, clouds, stars, and moons in the sky. I’m also inspired with what I’m currently interested in and feeling. My humble wish for creating anime is to have common images, conversations, and scenes sublimed into art works.

== Career ==
=== Beginnings as an animator ===
Upon graduation, Yuasa sought work by consulting recruitment advertisements published in the animation magazine Animage. After answering an advertisement posted by Ajia-do, he was hired by the studio as an in between animator. Yuasa initially struggled and came to believe he lacked talent and therefore had no future in the business. After an illness, he contemplated quitting, but lacking a good opportunity to actually do so, he continued on. A key turning point in his perception of his artistic skills came during his transition from drawing in between animation, which requires clean, uniform lifework that is consistent from artist to artist, to drawing key animation, which establishes the key poses of motion and are more reflective of the individual sensibilities of movement of each artist. Yuasa's natural drawing style was fast, intuitive, and rough; it lacked the fine lines emphasized for inbetweening. As a result, when Yuasa became a key animator, he was able to utilize his rougher line style for greater personal expression and began to make a name for himself. During this time, Yuasa also received encouragement and advice from Ajia-do's co-founder Osamu Kobayashi, a veteran animator with decades of experience. Kobayashi told Yuasa that he could not consider himself a master of animation unless he utilized abstract drawings as part of his movement; though these individual frames are not distinguishable in the blur of completed motion, they subconsciously influence viewer perception of the motion and the scene as a whole. The advice synchronized with Yuasa's own study of international animation techniques, and increasingly, he integrated them into his work. Yuasa was also advised by another co-founder of Ajia-do, animator and director Tsutomu Shibayama, who served as a mentor and gave him formative artistic guidance.

Yuasa earned his first significant credits as a key animator in 1990 on the landmark television series Chibi Maruko-chan (1990–1992), which Ajia-do worked on as a subcontractor studio. Based on a popular manga, Chibi Maruko-chan was a major hit and provided opportunities for Yuasa to refine his skills. His next breakthrough came with the film Chibi Maruko-chan: My Favorite Song (1992), on which he was entrusted with two musical sequences. Yuasa storyboarded the sequences, the first time he'd taken on this responsibility, and was able to animate them in his own characteristic style; he later identified these segments as the first time that appreciation of his work by fellow artists led him to view his own work as good.

In 1992, the next major step in Yuasa's animation career occurred when he joined the production team of the long-running and immensely popular series Crayon Shin-chan (1992–present). Consisting of a television series, numerous television specials, and annual theatrical film releases, the Crayon Shin-chan franchise quickly became a massive undertaking with continuous work and production opportunities. Working under the guidance of supervising director Mitsuru Hongo, Yuasa took on a variety of roles within the franchise's many television and film productions, including key animation, storyboarding, set and background design, prop and vehicle design, and contribution of story concepts and ideas. Yuasa quickly became a specialist at imagining, designing, and animating the inventive visual climaxes of the annual Crayon Shin-chan films, a practice he continued for nearly a decade. It was during his work on Crayon Shin-chan that Yuasa at last found enjoyment in his artistic work, as well as his first desire to become a director. That same year, Yuasa had his first chance to direct with an episode of the original video animation (OVA) series Anime Rakugo Kan (1992). Yuasa directed the third episode of the series, entitled The Squash Seller. Stylistically, the episode reflected Yuasa's admiration for the animation created by Kobayashi and Shimoyama earlier in their careers, and thus had a different visual aesthetic than Yuasa's later works. More than just an homage, the episode reflected a continuation of Yuasa's personal artistry; though he initially thought he would develop a completely different style, in the end, he incorporated elements of Kobayashi and Shimoyama's animation into his own.

1994 saw two significant developments in Yuasa's animation career: leaving Ajia-do to become a freelance animator, and participating as an animation director on the fourth episode of the landmark OVA series The Hakkenden: A New Saga (1993–1995). Based on the epic historical novel Nansō Satomi Hakkenden (1814–1842) and animated in a serious, realistic style, The Hakkenden was a unique challenge to Yuasa, who until that point had worked on comedic works with a loose, free-flowing visual aesthetic. This resulted in initial mistrust of Yuasa by the production team at AIC, the studio responsible for the series. However, Yuasa had been invited to join the production by episode director and maverick animator Shinya Ohira, who after seeing his work on Crayon Shin-chan sought him out and placed him in a position of responsibility for overseeing the animation on his episode of the series, entitled Hamaji’s Resurrection. Although the production was chaotic due to a compressed schedule which did not allow sufficient time for ensuring the visual coherence traditionally prized in animation, the result was a distinctive episode with an emphasis on realism, moving camera techniques, and expressive attention to small character acting details. As a result of this work, Ohira collaborated with Yuasa on subsequent productions. Hamaji's Resurrection generated considerable conversation within Japan's animation industry, was cited as one of the most important Japanese animated productions of the 1990s, and described as a masterpiece of Japanese animation.

Following the success of Hamaji's Resurrection, Yuasa continued working as a freelance animator for the remainder of the 1990s, including work on the Studio Ghibli feature film My Neighbors the Yamadas (1999). This freelance work brought additional early directorial and supervisory opportunities. These included the television pilot film Vampiyan Kids (1999), which Yuasa directed and storyboarded; the short film Slime Adventures: Yay, the Sea! (1999), based on the popular Dragon Quest franchise, which Yuasa directed; and the acclaimed short film Cat Soup (2001), on which he served as screenwriter and animation producer. Cat Soup was a critical success, winning an Excellence Award for animation at the Japan Media Arts Festival. The Cat Soup project in particular served as a springboard for Yuasa to move fully into the directorial phase of his career.

=== Move to directing and Mind Game ===
Yuasa's opportunity to move into feature film directing came when Eiko Tanaka, the co-founder and CEO of Studio 4°C, requested Yuasa adapt the Robin Nishi manga Mind Game. Although the manga was little-known by the general public, several prominent staff members of Studio 4 °C were passionate about the title, and studio co-founder Kōji Morimoto had previously introduced Yuasa to the series. Yuasa felt the material suited him and agreed to direct the project. The production utilized an experimental visual sensibility, incorporating a variety of illustrated styles and including the use of live-action footage. Yuasa was inspired to make use of this combination of styles in order to preserve the feeling of the original manga, which was drawn in a rough, visual-gag style. In Yuasa's words, "I wanted it to look as though we hadn’t worked very hard on it, though of course we had." Although the film's story stuck closely to that of the original manga, Yuasa made one significant change: he altered the ending to be more positive for all of the characters, not only the protagonist. The intent of this change would be reflected in Yuasa's future works: a desire to create positive stories, where passionate action results in the culmination of dreams and desires.

Produced on a small budget, the making of Mind Game took two years and nine months from planning to completion. The production was also Yuasa's first project with frequent artistic collaborator Nobutake Ito, who was tasked with animating the film's climactic sequence; Ito would subsequently serve as a character designer and animation director on many of Yuasa's later projects. Mind Game was released in 2004 but did not achieve commercial success; following the release of the film, Yuasa struggled to find producers who would support him. However, Mind Game went on to become a cult hit and achieved widespread global critical acclaim, winning the Mainichi Film Awards' Ōfuji Noburō Award, the Japan Media Arts Festival Grand Prize for Animation, and the Fantasia International Film Festival awards for Best Film, Director, Screenplay, and Visual Accomplishment, as well as the Audience Award for Best Animated Film. Upon the film's eventual release in the United States, Mind Game achieved a 100% rating on the review aggregator Rotten Tomatoes.

=== Television directing at Madhouse ===
Following the release of Mind Game, Yuasa's next directorial opportunity came when Masao Maruyama, the co-founder of Madhouse, provided a unique chance. Maruyama, who over his decades in the business had developed a reputation for making animated projects that no other producer would consider, offered Yuasa the chance to direct television series' at Madhouse. Moreover, Maruyama used his power as a veteran producer to push the television networks to take risks, allowing Yuasa creative freedom and the opportunity to make precisely the sort of content that he wanted to make. The first of these projects was the original horror romance series Kemonozume (2006), which Yuasa created, directed, and wrote. The production marked a significant development in Yuasa's career, as it resulted in him meeting a key collaborator: South Korean artist Eunyoung Choi, who had recently moved to Japan to become an animator. Choi's work on Kemonozume as a key animator and episode animation director won praise from fellow animators and fans, and led to her participation in Yuasa's subsequent projects. Kemonozume was awarded a Jury Selection Prize at the Japan Media Arts Festival, continuing Yuasa's run of critical successes.

Before beginning his next project at Madhouse, Yuasa briefly returned to Studio 4 °C to direct a short film for the studio's anthology project Genius Party (2007). The film, entitled Happy Machine, centered on an infant's travels through a mysterious and dangerous world. Produced with a small crew of just four key animators, Happy Machine represented a continuation of the development of Yuasa's surreal visual style, winning acclaim both for its atmospheric sense of wonderment, and for Yuasa himself as a leader of Japan's experimental animation scene.

The following year Yuasa helmed his next television production at Madhouse, the original sci-fi drama series Kaiba (2008), which he created, directed, and wrote. The project saw an expansion of the collaboration with Eunyoung Choi, who directed and storyboarded episodes of the series, as well as co-writing an episode with Yuasa. A narratively-ambitious series dealing with memory, identity, and societal inequality, Kaiba received an Excellence Award at the Japan Media Arts Festival, and earned positive critical attention for its dreamlike visuals and imaginative story, with particular focus on the emotional impact generated from combining childlike imagery with mature themes and at times devastating loss.

In 2010, Yuasa completed his third and final television series at Madhouse, the absurdist psychological dramedy The Tatami Galaxy (2010). Adapted from a novel by Tomihiko Morimi, the series follows the misadventures of a nameless student who, via supernatural means, repeatedly relives his final year at college in an attempt to achieve his idealized conceptions of romance and happiness. After being approached with the opportunity to adapt the novel, Yuasa quickly saw the story's appeal and agreed, though the project presented challenges in transferring the witty, dialogue-intensive style of the original work into a visual medium. To capture the appeal of the novel, Yuasa emphasized the use of rapid-fire editing and fast-paced dialogue, in order to convey the protagonist's stream of consciousness narration. Unlike the earlier Kemonozume and Kaiba, which aired on the satellite television network WOWOW, The Tatami Galaxy was broadcast on national television via Fuji TV's Noitamina programming block. The broadcasting deal with Fuji TV marked the start of an ongoing relationship with producer Kōji Yamamoto, who served as the chief producer of Noitamina before leaving to found his own development company Twin Engine; this relationship would cover the release of several later projects over the following decade. The Tatami Galaxy was an immediate critical success, winning both the Japan Media Arts Festival Grand Prize for Animation, as well as the Award for Outstanding Television Animation at the Tokyo Anime Awards Festival. As the first of Yuasa's projects to receive a streaming release in North America, the series helped increase awareness of his work globally, and was subsequently named one of the best Japanese animated series of the decade.

Following the completion of The Tatami Galaxy, Madhouse was acquired by the broadcasting media conglomerate NTV. The studio's corporate culture underwent change, and Madhouse's creative head Masao Maruyama left to found a new production company. Yuasa once again sought opportunities with other studios, including briefly joining the production of the A-1 Pictures film Welcome to the Space Show (2010), for which he directed and animated a short sequence. He also directed the short series Shin-men (2010–2012), a group of special episodes embedded within the main Crayon Shin-chan television series.

=== Collaboration, crowdfunding, and the founding of Science Saru ===
Yuasa took advantage of the conclusion of his work at Madhouse to reunite with collaborator Eunyoung Choi, who had left Madhouse after working on The Tatami Galaxy to lead Ankama Japan, a Japan-based subsidiary of the French entertainment and animation company Ankama. The newly opened studio combined techniques of traditional hand-drawn animation with digital animation created via Adobe Animate and other programs, a new approach which Yuasa had not previously used. The studio was not only an international business enterprise, but a creative one as well, with 25 European animators working in the Tokyo-based studio. In a reversal of their prior roles, Yuasa joined a project which Choi had organized, an episode of the company's Wakfu animated series entitled Noximilien the Watchmaker (2010); Choi directed the episode, while Yuasa served as character designer. Shortly after completion of the episode, the 2011 Tōhoku earthquake and tsunami occurred and Ankama closed the Japan studio. However, the experience at Ankama Japan, which mixed an international animation crew with a production method utilizing both traditional and digital animation, served as a model for Yuasa and Choi's later studio, Science Saru.

Yuasa and Choi continued their collaboration on their next project, the crowdfunded short film Kick-Heart (2013), which Yuasa directed and wrote, and for which Choi served as assistant director. An unlikely love story revolving around a masochistic male wrestler and his sadistic female opponent, the film was produced at Production I.G and was the first large-scale Japanese animated project to be successfully crowdfunded on Kickstarter, raising over $200,000 from more than 3,200 backers worldwide. The film received a pair of unannounced surprise screenings on Cartoon Network's Toonami programming block which achieved viewer ratings of 708,000 and 618,000, and earned positive reviews for its colorful visual storytelling. Kick-Heart was an official competition selection at Annecy, was awarded a Jury Selection Prize at the Japan Media Arts Festival, and won the prize for Best Animated Short Film at the Fantasia Festival.

During the production of Kick-Heart, Choi proposed establishing a studio with Yuasa. In February 2013, the new company was established under the name Science Saru. Yuasa and Choi settled on the name, which translates into English as "Science Monkey", in an attempt to combine both an international, technological focus (the 'Science' portion of the name, rendered in English), with a Japanese, traditional animation identity (the 'SARU' portion, rendered in Japanese). Additionally, Yuasa, who frequently drew himself as a monkey in self-portraits, wanted the studio to be smarter than an ape; as a result, he added the word Science in front of SARU with the intent of having a company that possesses both instinct and intelligence. The studio's first production location was a small suburban house converted into an impromptu workspace; by the end of 2013, the company had expanded to a staff of five.

=== Early works at Science Saru ===
Yuasa's new studio began its corporate activities by taking on subcontracting work, as well as by collaborating with other companies. Science Saru's first project was an episode of the American television series Adventure Time; the episode, entitled "Food Chain" (2014), was directed by Yuasa, co-directed by Choi, and produced entirely in-house. "Food Chain" received critical acclaim as one of the best episodes of the series, was an official competition selection at Annecy, and was nominated for the Annie Award for Outstanding Television Direction.

Later the same year, Yuasa returned to television series direction with an adaptation of Taiyō Matsumoto's sports manga Ping Pong the Animation (2014). In addition to directing the series, Yuasa wrote and storyboarded all of the episodes. Science Saru provided 'digitally assisted' animation production services, while Tatsunoko Production served as the primary studio. The series also reunited Yuasa with his old animation collaborator Shinya Ohira, who contributed the opening credits sequence. A major critical success, the series was highlighted as one of the best Japanese animated series of the decade. Ping Pong the Animation was awarded a Jury Selection Prize at the Japan Media Arts Festival, and won the Grand Prize for Television Animation at the Tokyo Anime Awards Festival; additionally, character designer and longtime collaborator Nobutake Ito won the Best Animator award for individual achievement.

Yuasa finished 2014 by directing an episode of the BONES television series Space Dandy (2014). The episode, entitled "Slow and Steady Wins the Race, Baby", was jointly produced by Bones and Science Saru and received critical acclaim.

=== Return to feature films ===
By early 2016, Science Saru had gained experience and was ready to undertake large-scale projects. The studio's first feature film production, the family-friendly fantasy film Lu Over the Wall (2017), was produced in less than 16 months using 'digitally assisted' animation techniques. Yuasa directed and co-wrote Lu Over the Wall; it was his first feature film with an original story. The film features the importance of self-expression as a central theme; Yuasa emphasized this aspect of the story in hopes of encouraging young people in Japan, who he felt were often not able to express their true feelings and emotions. Yuasa also decided to focus this project on a family audience out of a desire to return to the sensibility of his earlier works as an animator, including Crayon Shin-chan and Chibi Maruko-chan.

During the production of Lu Over the Wall, Yuasa was offered the opportunity to produce a second feature film, the comedy romance The Night Is Short, Walk On Girl (2017), based on the novel by Tomihiko Morimi. The offer served as a unique chance for Yuasa, who had previously hoped to adapt the novel in 2010 after the completion of The Tatami Galaxy, but due to circumstances at the time was unable to. When he was given another chance in 2016, he immediately agreed and made use of the preparatory work he had done when initially offered the project. The film reunited a majority of the key creative staff who had worked on The Tatami Galaxy, with the story serving both as a spiritual successor and as a parallel narrative to the earlier series. The timing of the project resulted in the pre-production work on The Night is Short, Walk On Girl overlapping with the post-production of Lu Over the Wall. Although Lu Over the Wall was completed first, it was released after The Night is Short, Walk On Girl; this was in part due to a marketing suggestion that it might be preferable for the studio's first film to be based on a pre-existing property familiar to Japanese audiences.

Both Lu Over the Wall and The Night is Short, Walk On Girl received immediate critical acclaim. Lu Over the Wall received the Annecy Cristal du long métrage, the Mainichi Film Awards' Ōfuji Noburō Award, and the Japan Media Arts Festival Grand Prize for Animation. The Night is Short, Walk On Girl was awarded the Japan Academy Film Prize for Animation of the Year, the Ottawa International Animation Festival Grand Prize for Best Animated Feature, a Jury Selection Prize at the Japan Media Arts Festival, and has been listed as one of the best Japanese animated films of the decade.

=== International recognition ===
In 2018, Yuasa achieved widespread international recognition following the release of his prior feature film works, as well as the debut of a landmark new series. The beginning of the year saw Mind Game, Lu Over the Wall, and The Night is Short, Walk On Girl licensed for North American release by acclaimed animation distributor GKIDS. However, even more important for Yuasa's international prominence was the release of the Netflix series Devilman crybaby (2018), based on the manga by Go Nagai. Yuasa had been a fan of the original manga since childhood, but had never dreamed he would have the opportunity to adapt it. Among his key creative decisions in adapting the story were to depict the sexual and violent content in an unrestricted way that was not possible when the manga was initially published, and to update the juvenile delinquent characters of the original as young rappers who use music to speak their minds freely. Devilman Crybaby was an immediate and massive international hit; with 90% of its viewers outside Japan, the series achieved the largest global audience for both Yuasa and Science Saru to that date. The series inspired internet memes, was profiled by YouTuber PewDiePie, and was widely discussed on Twitter. The series was nominated in 7 categories at the Crunchyroll Anime Awards and won for Anime of the Year and Director of the Year, was awarded a Jury Selection Prize at the Japan Media Arts Festival, was cited by Vulture as containing one of the 100 most influential sequences in global animation history, and was listed as one of the best Japanese animated series of the decade.

In 2019, Yuasa directed his next feature film, the romance Ride Your Wave (2019). An original story, the film centers on an unlikely couple who are able to come together despite heartbreak, and deals with meditative themes of loss. Despite the success of Lu Over the Wall, following completion of that film, Yuasa grappled with the same lack of confidence in his work that had marked his earlier career. He felt that depicting a story with two characters who lacked self-confidence, but were able to overcome this and other obstacles by accepting risk and riding the metaphorical waves of life, would be meaningful to both audiences and himself. Ride Your Wave received worldwide critical acclaim. The film was an official competition selection at Annecy, was nominated for the Mainichi Film Award for Best Animation Film, was nominated for Annie Awards in the categories of Best Indie Feature and Outstanding Feature Film Direction, received a Jury Selection Prize at the Japan Media Arts Festival, and won Best Animated Feature Film awards at the Shanghai International Film Festival, Fantasia International Film Festival, and Sitges Film Festival.

Also in 2019, Yuasa served as director of the series Super Shiro (2019–2020), an installment of the popular Crayon Shin-chan franchise. Yuasa collaborated on directorial duties with veteran animator Tomohisa Shimoyama, who made his directorial debut with the series. The project, animated at Science Saru and produced in association with main Crayon Shin-chan studio Shin-Ei Animation, served as a culmination of Yuasa's long and enduring association with Crayon Shin-chan which dated back to his years as an animator. The series was distributed via streaming and broadcast in Japan and throughout the Asia-Pacific region, excluding China. The end of the year saw the 2010s heralded as Masaaki Yuasa's "breakout decade"; collectively, Devilman crybaby and the release of Yuasa's films in the United States led to him being acknowledged as one of the most important and exciting directors in animation.

In 2020, Yuasa directed the comedy television series Keep Your Hands Off Eizouken! (2020), based on the manga by Sumito Ōwara. The series revolves around three high school girls who create animation as passionate amateurs. Prior to the project being proposed, Yuasa had discovered the manga after seeing comments from fans online suggesting that he adapt the title. The production encouraged members of the Science Saru staff, including Yuasa, to share their own experiences about creating animation, all of which added to the story. The series boosted sales of the original manga, inspired internet memes, and won the Japanese Broadcast Critics Association's monthly Galaxy Award during its broadcast run. Following the conclusion of the broadcast, Keep Your Hands Off Eizouken! received critical acclaim as one of the best Japanese animated series of both the season that it aired and the year as a whole, and was recognized by The New York Times and The New Yorker as one of the best television series of 2020. The series was nominated in 10 categories at the Crunchyroll Anime Awards and won for Director of the Year and Best Animation, was awarded the Grand Prize for Television Animation at the Tokyo Anime Awards Festival, and received the Japan Media Arts Festival Grand Prize for Animation.

Later that year, Science Saru produced the Netflix series Japan Sinks: 2020 (2020), based on the disaster novel by Sakyo Komatsu. Yuasa directed in conjunction with Pyeon-Gang Ho, who made her directorial debut with the series. The project represented a unique challenge for Science Saru in that it depicted serious subject matter in a more realistic style. Central to Yuasa's conception of the series were the immediacy of focus on a single family amid national catastrophe, as well as the idea of societal reincarnation, where the process of breaking and rebuilding can yield something better than what came before. The series attracted criticism within Japan for its condemnation of Japanese nationalism, but also received positive attention for its multiculturalism and inclusiveness, and was named as one of the best anime series of 2020. The first episode of the series was awarded the Annecy Jury Prize for a Television Series, and the series as a whole received two nominations at the Crunchyroll Anime Awards. A film compilation version of the series was subsequently released in Japanese theaters in November 2020, and was awarded a Jury Selection Prize at the Japan Media Arts Festival.

On March 25, 2020, Yuasa stepped down as president and representative director of Science Saru. He cited his desire to take a break from directing after seven years of continuous work, but reaffirmed his commitment to completing additional projects with Science Saru in the future. Eunyoung Choi subsequently became CEO and president of the studio. She likewise affirmed Yuasa's continued involvement with the studio as a creator. Yuasa spoke further about his planned break from directing in September 2021, stating that he was "taking a break to study" during his time away from active production.

In early 2021, Yuasa was recognized by the Japanese government's Agency for Cultural Affairs, which awarded him the Cabinet Minister Award for Media Fine Arts for his career achievements. Yuasa thanked the creative collaborators, artistic staff, and cast members of his works, saying that they shared jointly in the honor. Later that year, Yuasa was further recognized with the Medal of Honor with Purple Ribbon by the Japanese government in recognition of his distinguished contributions to artistic and cultural development.

Yuasa's latest project is the musical drama Inu-Oh (2021), based on the novel by Hideo Furukawa. Set in 14th Century Japan, the story centers on a blind musician and a Noh actor afflicted by a terrible curse; Yuasa's goals with the film were to portray both characters as historical equivalents of modern-day pop stars, and to utilize the themes of the narrative to highlight people marginalized by society. The film features character designs by Ping Pong creator Taiyō Matsumoto, is produced by Science Saru, and was licensed for North American theatrical and home-video distribution by GKIDS. The film made its world premiere at the Venice International Film Festival in September 2021, and a worldwide theatrical release followed in August 2022. Inu-Oh earned Yuasa the best reviews of his career and achieved universal critical acclaim during its international film festival run. The film won the Best Animated Feature Film award at the Fantasia International Film Festival, the Bucheon International Animation Festival's Special Distinction Prize for an International Feature Film, and was nominated for the Golden Globe Award for Best Animated Feature Film.

On February 18, 2025, Yuasa announced the founding of a new animation studio, ame pippin. Yuasa's first project for ame pippin will be an adaptation of Banana Yoshimoto's novel Daisy's Life, set for release in 2026.

== Works ==
- Anime Rakugo Kan - Episode 3 (1992)
- Slime Adventures: Yay, the Sea! (1999)
- Vampiyan Kids (TV pilot) (1999)
- Mind Game (2004)
- Kemonozume (2006)
- Genius Party: Happy Machine (2007)
- Kaiba (2008)
- The Tatami Galaxy (2010)
- Shin-men (2010–2012)
- Kick-Heart (2013)
- Space Dandy - Episode 16: Slow and Steady Wins the Race, Baby (2014)
- Ping Pong The Animation (2014)
- The Night Is Short, Walk On Girl (2017)
- Lu Over the Wall (2017)
- Devilman Crybaby (2018)
- Ride Your Wave (2019)
- Super Shiro (2019–20)
- Keep Your Hands Off Eizouken! (2020)
- Japan Sinks: 2020 (2020)
- Japan Sinks: 2020 Theatrical Edition (2020)
- Inu-Oh (2021)
- Daisy's Life (2026)

== Themes and creative sensibilities ==
Yuasa's works have been described as emphasizing love, kindness, and acceptance. The importance of communication, self-expression, and the ability to reveal one's true feelings are themes that Yuasa has repeatedly expressed and highlighted as central to his works. Yuasa feels a particular affinity for intensely-felt love stories; in portrayals of sex and eroticism, he seeks to visualize the emotions his characters are experiencing, and to understand how their desires would be expressed. In depicting emotions, Yuasa's intent is to maintain realism and authenticity, but the visuals through which the emotions are represented can be expressionistic; moreover, it is Yuasa's view that characters who move freely and unrestrained by strict realism can express a greater and more faithful range of emotionality. Transformation is also a central and recurring motif, whether utilized for the frightening body horror of Kemonozume and Devilman: crybaby, the visualization of life cycles in Food Chain, the unexpected transformation of a dog into a superhero of Super Shiro, the magical shapeshifting of Lu Over the Wall, or the societal renewal of Japan Sinks: 2020. Yuasa's male protagonists have been described as quintessentially aimless, hapless, and afraid to communicate honestly, but who are able to find their voice over the course of the story. While female characters in his earlier works received some criticism for not being as well developed, Yuasa's later works have received recognition for strong, independent female protagonists who are neither defined nor restricted by gender assumptions. Generational issues are also presented in Yuasa's works, with a recurring theme of young people utilizing acceptance and positivity to help the older generation overcome fears that have caused pain and discrimination in the past. A representative and humanistic identification with people marginalized by society, whether due to race, disability, gender identity, sexuality, or other reasons, runs throughout Yuasa's work. In telling a story, Yuasa has noted that he hopes to give the audience freedom to feel a variety of different ways about the work. He does not see it as his place to tell viewers how they must feel, but rather to maintain a space between his intent and the audience's interpretation that allows for individual impressions of meaning.

With regard to Yuasa's views on the Japanese animation industry, Yuasa has expressed a desire to move away from a culture of excessive work and long hours which have traditionally been endemic to the business, and to instead focus on practices which more closely resemble those utilized in American and European animation. As a result, Science Saru has modeled itself on these ideas, with emphasis on providing rest, taking time off, and maintaining regular working hours. It is Yuasa's opinion that, in order for Japanese animation to achieve true global success, the industry must itself create a better work environment for its artists and creators. Yuasa has also noted the importance of preserving traditional animation, noting that if the industry does not continuously show how wonderful traditional animation can be, the pressure to switch to computer animation will result in it being supplanted.

== Awards and acclaim ==
Masaaki Yuasa's works have achieved significant acclaim both in Japan and throughout the world. Projects which Yuasa has directed, or for which he has served as a chief creative collaborator, have been recognized by the Annecy International Animated Film Festival (2 wins, 3 nominations), the Japan Academy Film Prize Association (1 win), the Golden Globe Awards (1 nomination), the Mainichi Film Awards (2 wins, 1 nomination), the Japan Media Arts Festival (4 wins, 2 excellence awards, 7 jury selections), the Tokyo Anime Awards (4 wins), the Crunchyroll Anime Awards (4 wins, 16 nominations), the Ottawa International Animation Festival (1 win, 1 nomination), the Shanghai International Film Festival (1 win, 1 nomination) the Sitges Film Festival (1 win, 3 nominations), the Fantasia International Film Festival (3 wins, 1 silver, 1 bronze), the Satellite Awards (1 nomination), and the Annie Awards (3 nominations). Additionally, Yuasa has been recognized by the Japanese government, receiving the Agency for Cultural Affairs' Cabinet Minister Award for Media Fine Arts, and the Medal of Honor with Purple Ribbon for his career accomplishments.
