= Daisy's Life =

2000 novel by Banana Yoshimoto

First edition

Daisy's Life (Japanese: ひな菊の人生, Hepburn: Hinagiku no Jinsei) is a Japanese novel written by Banana Yoshimoto and illustrated by Yoshitomo Nara, published in 2000.

== Plot ==
It talks about a girl named Daisy, who is undergoing a healing process by facing one obstacle after another. Although Daisy may look like a normal girl at first glance, but she holds some secrets within herself. The main theme of this book is healing. Banana Yoshimoto hopes that Daisy's Life will heal young people's wounds inflicted by the outside world. She provides alternatives, such as new beginnings and dreams, at the end of her book to enlighten her readers. She believes that both Japan and Korea face similar challenges regarding the young generation. She thinks the young people are currently stuck in a bleak situation, which is worse than it was 20 years ago when she first began her career. She hopes that her book will be able to help search for an answer.

== Development history ==
Banana Yoshimoto visited Korea twice since she started her career as a writer. Her first was for the release of her fiction series, Kingdom (王国), in Korean and the second for the promotion of this book.

== Anime film adaptation ==
An anime film adaptation directed by Masaaki Yuasa has been announced for release in 2026 and is set to be the debut project of his new studio Ame Pippin. Yoshitomo Nara has been announced as the film's character designer.
