= Kick-Heart =

2013 film by Masaaki Yuasa

- Official theatrical and DVD poster
- Directed by: Masaaki Yuasa
- Screenplay by: Masaaki Yuasa
- Produced by: Justin Leach; Hidekazu Terakawa
- Starring: Tatsuhisa Suzuki; Takako Honda
- Music by: Oorutaichi
- Production company: Production I.G
- Release date: 2013
- Running time: 12 minutes
- Country: Japan
- Languages: Japanese; English
- Budget: $201,164 (estimated)

Kick-Heart (キックハート, Kikkuhāto) is a 2013 Japanese anime short film that uses surreal-psychedelic animation and storytelling to tell a love story between a professional wrestler and a nun. The film was directed by Masaaki Yuasa through Production I.G studios, who ran a successful Kickstarter campaign to fund the short. The short screened on Toonami in 2013 and has screened at several festivals such as the BFI London Film Festival.

Regarding the film's production, Yuasa stated that he completed Kick-Heart's script and story before beginning work on the storyboards.

== Plot ==
The short opens with Masked Man M taking on an extremely obese female wrestler in the ring. She traps him in her skin folds, but Masked Man M manages to escape. The obese wrestler tags out to Lady S, who kicks Masked Man M in the chest - a move he greatly enjoys. This prompts him to accidentally swap out with his partner Chicken, who tries and fails to attack Lady S. She proceeds to beat him while an envious Masked Man M watches, begging for Chicken to swap out with him. Chicken succeeds, but Lady S also swaps out with the obese wrestler, to his dismay. Masked Man M manages to beat the obese wrestler, which angers The Boss. He storms down to the dressing room to confront Masked Man M and Chicken, as Lady S was supposed to win the match. The Boss just barely misses the two as they flee the arena, Masked Man M carrying a box of Lady S dolls he stole.

Masked Man M, whose real name is revealed to be Romeo Maki, manages to make it into a bathroom where he changes his clothes and drives to a vending machine that distributes pornography. He tries to purchase a BDSM themed magazine, only for the machine to loudly thank him for his purchase - alerting all of the people that live nearby. Romeo takes off with his magazine and arrives at the rundown orphanage he operates. The children, still awake after watching the wrestling match on TV, happily greet him and Romeo is introduced to the novice nun Sister Juliet. The other staff members extol Sister's academic achievement in the field of psychology, while Romeo finds himself instantly attracted to her. Meanwhile, one of the other staff members, an elderly nun, brings in the dolls Romeo brought home as well as the BDSM magazine. The children are then shown playing with the toys while one boy discovers the magazine. Sister Juliet quickly confiscates the magazine (which is wrapped in plastic) and hands it back to the little boy a few moments later. The elderly nun takes it from the boy, which panics Romeo. However, Sister Juliet has swapped it out with a regular wrestling magazine that features Masked Man M on the cover.

Sister Juliet surprises Romeo, already busy on the toilet, and bewails that it has been used. The children explain that the toilet is in disrepair. The elder nun also laments to Romeo about the deterioration of the orphanage. Later that night, Romeo receives a call from The Boss, who tells him that Lady S has specifically asked to fight him. The winner will receive $500,000 in prize money. Romeo agrees, and the next night he eagerly returns to the ring as Masked Man M.

The two proceed to fight one another, much to Masked Man M's joy. The fight progresses until Lady S traps Masked Man M in a headlock, suffocating him while telling him, "This is what you want, right?" She brings him to a near-death experience while telling him that he should just remain in his fantasy world. However, the children from his orphanage are attending that night and beg Masked Man M not to give up, which spurs him to touch one of the wrestling ring ropes with his foot. This forces Lady S to release him from the headlock, but she then proceeds to continually beat him. Lady S overestimates the power in one of her jumps and ends up getting knocked out by the impact when Masked Man M dodges at the last moment. He holds her down and almost wins, but at the last second is signaled to throw the match, which he does. After the match Masked Man M's popularity takes off and Romeo returns to the orphanage where he realizes that Sister Juliet is Lady S, and has used the money to fix the place up, as he had originally intended.

== The First Crowdfunded Anime ==
Kick-Heart was the first successful anime project from a major commercial animation studio in Japan to use crowdfunding (via Kickstarter) to finance its production. The success of Kick-Heart helped open the doors for other creators in Japan to create a new wave of original projects. Creators have said that crowdfunding gives them more creative freedom as opposed to the more conservative production committee approach.

== Cast ==
=== Japanese cast ===
- Takako Honda as Sister Juliet/Lady S.
- Tatsuhisa Suzuki as Romeo Maki/Masked Man M.
- Kokoro Kikuchi as Mage-chan
- Kyouko Chikiri as Posse
- Makiko Nitta as Sister
- Mitsuaki Kanuka as Boss
- Miyuki Satou as Vacuum Fat
- Shinobu Matsumoto as Devil Chicken
- Wataru Takagi as Father
- Yoshihisa Kawahara as Announcer
- Yuko Kaida as New Ace

=== English cast ===
- Stephanie Sheh as Sister Juliet/Lady S.
- Richard Epcar as Romeo Maki/Masked Man M.
- JB Blanc as The Boss
- Ellyn Stern as The Sister
- Stephen Weese as Devil Chicken/Parrot

== Reception ==
Twitch Film gave a positive review for Kick-Heart, stating that its artwork style more resembled the work of Bill Plympton rather than the traditional anime styles. Otaku USA also praised the film, remarking that it "really goes back to the basics of visual storytelling and tells its tale with very little dialogue".

An estimated 618,000 to 708,000 people viewed the Toonami broadcast of Kick-Heart.

=== Awards ===
- Original Design at the Animation Block Party Festival, Brooklyn New York (2013, winner)
- Best Animated Short Film at the Fantasia Festival (2013, winner)
- Drawn and Quartered: Animated Shorts at the Fantastic Fest (2013, runner up)
- Runner-up Best Animated Short, Narrative Competition at the Cut-Out Film Fest, Querétaro Mexico (2013, winner)

== See also ==
- Fray Tormenta
