= Ōfuji Noburō Award =

Japanese animation film award

- Awarded for: Excellence in animation
- Country: Japan
- First award: 1962

The Ōfuji Noburō Award (大藤信郎賞, Ōfuji Noburō shō) is an animation award given at the Mainichi Film Awards. It is named after Japanese animator Noburō Ōfuji.

== History ==
Following the death of pioneering animator Noburō Ōfuji in 1961, Mainichi established a new award in his honour to recognise animation excellence. A specialist in silhouette animation, Ōfuji was one of the earliest Japanese animators to gain international recognition, winning accolades at the 1952 Cannes Film Festival and the 1956 Venice Film Festival. This award was first presented in 1962 for Tale of a Street Corner (ある街角の物語, Aru Machi Kado no Monogatari) by Osamu Tezuka.

With the growth of the animation industry in Japan in the 1980s, the award came to be dominated by big budget studio productions, over the work of the independent animators for whose efforts it was originally established. To address this concern, the Animation Grand Award was established to reward large scale cinematic animation, enabling the Ōfuji award to focus on shorter pieces again. Th Animation Grand Award was first presented in 1989 for Kiki's Delivery Service (魔女の宅急便, Majo no Takkyūbin) by Hayao Miyazaki.

The award encompasses a wider variety of animation, including stop motion. Two of the most frequent winners over the years, Tadanari Okamoto (岡本忠成, Okamoto Tadanari) and Kihachirō Kawamoto (川本喜八郎), specialize mainly in stop motion. Russian animator Aleksandr Petrov also won for his paint-on-glass animation film, The Old Man and the Sea.

== Winners ==
- 1962 - Tale of a Street Corner (ある街角の物語, Aru Machi Kado no Monogatari) by Osamu Tezuka
- 1963 - Wanpaku Ōji no Orochi Taiji by Yugo Serikawa/Toei Doga
- 1964 - Murder (殺人 MURDER) by Makoto Wada
- 1965 - Love (愛 Ai) by Yoji Kuri and The Mysterious Medicine (ふしぎなくすり Fushigi na Kusuri) by Tadanari Okamoto
- 1966 - Pictures at an Exhibition (展覧会の絵 Tenrankai no E) by Osamu Tezuka
- 1967 - Two Pikes (二匹のサンマ Ni-Hiki no Sanma) and The Room (部屋 Heya) by Yoji Kuri
- 1968 - The Ugly Duckling (みにくいあひるのこ Minikui Ahiru no Ko) by Gakken
- 1969 - Yasashii Lion (やさしいライオン) by Mushi Production
- 1970 - The Flower and the Mole (花ともぐら Hana to Mogura) and Home, My Home (ホーム・マイホーム) by Tadanari Okamoto
- 1971 - Tenma no Torayan (てんまのとらやん) by Video Tokyo
- 1972 - Oni (鬼) by Kihachirō Kawamoto
- 1973 - Praise Be to Small Ills (南無一病息災 Nanmu Ichibyousokusai) by Tadanari Okamoto
- 1974 - A Poet's Life (詩人の生涯 Shijin no Shougai) by Kihachirō Kawamoto
- 1975 - The Water Seed (水のたね Mizu no Tane) by Tadanari Okamoto
- 1976 - Dojoji Temple (道成寺 Dojoji) by Kihachirō Kawamoto
- 1977 - Towards the Rainbow (虹に向かって Miji ni Mukatte) by Tadanari Okamoto
- 1978 - Not awarded
- 1979 - The Castle of Cagliostro
- 1980 - Speed (スピード) by Taku Furukawa
- 1981 - Gauche the Cellist
- 1982 - The Magic Ballad (おこんじょうるり) by Tadanari Okamoto
- 1983 - Barefoot Gen
- 1984 - Nausicaä of the Valley of the Wind
- 1985 - Night on the Galactic Railroad
- 1986 - Castle in the Sky
- 1987 - Legend of the Forest Part 1 (森の伝説) by Osamu Tezuka
- 1988 - My Neighbor Totoro
- 1989 - Not awarded
- 1990 - Briar Rose, or The Sleeping Beauty (いばら姫、またはねむり姫 Ibarahime Mata wa Nemurihime) by Kihachirō Kawamoto
- 1991 - The Restaurant of Many Orders (注文の多い料理店 Chuumon no Ooi Ryouriten) by Tadanari Okamoto/Kihachirō Kawamoto
- 1992 - Not awarded
- 1993 - Ginga no Uo ~Ursa Minor Blue~ (銀河の魚 ~URSA minor BLUE~) by Shigeru Tamura
- 1994 - Not awarded
- 1995 - Memories (「MEMORIES」大友克洋) by Katsuhiro Ōtomo
- 1996 - Rusuban (るすばん) by N&G Production
- 1997 - Not awarded
- 1998 - Mizu no Sei Kappa Hyakuzu (水の精河童百図) by Shirokumi
- 1999 - Rōjin to Umi - The Old Man and the Sea (「老人と海」アレクサンドル・ペトロフと技術スタッフ) by Aleksandr Petrov
- 2000 - Blood: The Last Vampire by Hiroyuki Kitakubo/Production I.G
- 2001 - Kujiratori (くじらとり) by Studio Ghibli
- 2002 - Millennium Actress (千年女優 Sennen Joyū) by Satoshi Kon/Madhouse
- 2003 - Winter Days (冬の日 Fuyu no Hi)
- 2004 - Mind Game (マインド・ゲーム) by Masaaki Yuasa/Studio 4°C
- 2005 - tough guy! by Shintarō Kishimoto
- 2006 - Tekkon Kinkreet (鉄コン筋クリート, Tekkon Kinkurīto) by Michael Arias/Studio 4°C
- 2007 - A Country Doctor (カフカ 田舎医者) by Kōji Yamamura
- 2008 - Ponyo (崖の上のポニョ, Gake no Ue no Ponyo) by Hayao Miyazaki/Studio Ghibli
- 2009 - Denshin-Bashira Elemi no Koi by Hideto Nakata/Sovat Theater
- 2010 - Not awarded
- 2011 - 663114 by Isamu Hirabayashi
- 2012 - Combustible (火要鎮) by Katsuhiro Ōtomo
- 2013 - The Moon That Fell Into the Sea (海に落ちた月の話) by Akira Oda
- 2014 - Crazy Little Thing (澱みの騒ぎ) by Onohana
- 2015 - Datum Point (水準原点) by Ryo Orikasa
- 2016 - In This Corner of the World (この世界の片隅に) by Sunao Katabuchi
- 2017 - Lu Over the Wall (夜明け告げるルーのうた) by Masaaki Yuasa
- 2018 - Liz and the Blue Bird (リズと青い鳥) by Naoko Yamada
- 2019 - A Japanese Boy Who Draws (ある日本の絵描き少年) by Masanao Kawajiri
- 2020 - On-Gaku: Our Sound (音楽) by Kenji Iwaisawa
- 2021 - Pukkulapottas and Hours in the Forest (プックラポッタと森の時間) by Takeshi Yashiro
- 2022 - Inu-Oh (犬王) by Masaaki Yuasa
- 2023 - The Boy and the Heron (君たちはどう生きるか) by Hayao Miyazaki
- 2024 - Watashi wa, Watashi to, Watashi ga, Watashi o, (私は、私と、私が、私を、) by Rina Itou
- 2025 - Ordinary Life (普通の生活) by Yoriko Mizushiri

== See also ==
- List of animation awards
