= Kemonozume =

2006 Anime series

ケモノヅメ
- Genre: Action, horror, romance
- Created by: Masaaki Yuasa; Madhouse
- Anime television series
- Directed by: Masaaki Yuasa; Atsushi Takahashi (assistant)
- Written by: Masaaki Yuasa
- Music by: Kei Wakakusa
- Studio: Madhouse
- Original network: WOWOW
- Original run: August 5, 2006 – November 5, 2006
- Episodes: 13

Kemonozume (ケモノヅメ; lit. 'Beast Claw') is a Japanese anime television series that was created, directed, and written by Masaaki Yuasa, with Nobutake Itō in charge of character designs and Kei Wakakusa composing the music. The series was produced by Madhouse and aired on WOWOW from August 5 to November 5, 2006.

== Plot ==
Since ancient times, there has existed a race of flesh eating monsters called shokujinki (食人鬼; lit. 'Man-Eating Ogres'), which could either assume a human-like form or otherwise live in the shadows while feeding on humans. The Kifūken (鬼封剣; lit. 'Ogre-Sealing Sword') martial arts style school was created to hunt down these mythical creatures and its teachings have been passed down through the generations to the Momota family. The story revolves around the forbidden romance between Toshihiko, the latest heir of the Kifūuken school, and Yuka, a young woman who is also a shokujinki.

== Characters ==
Toshihiko Momota (桃田 俊彦, Momota Toshihiko) is a 30-year-old skilled, disciplined swordsman and the chosen heir of the Kifūken dojo. Throughout his life, he has been dedicated to the sword and has inherited the Kifūken dojo.

In a twist of fate, he meets Yuka one night while she's skydiving. Though he tries to resist his feelings, he immediately falls in love with her, and the two begin a passionate relationship. Up until his father's death, he has no idea that Yuka is a Shokujinki.

When her real identity is discovered, he relinquishes his responsibility by running away with Yuka. Though the relationship faces several perils and hardships, Toshihiko truly loves her. One thing that contrasts their relationship to that of Harumi and Jūzō is his refusal to use Kemonozume in the final battle.

Despite his injuries and losing an arm, he refuses to cut off Yuka's arm and fights against Ōba with all his strength and wits. At the end of the series, he and Yuka raise their daughter peacefully. Jin, Bon, and Saru are seen with the family, vacationing together.

Voiced by: Hidenobu Kiuchi

Yuka Kamitsuki (上月 由香, Kamitsuki Yuka) A 30-year-old Shokujinki who works as a skydiving instructor. She fell in love with Toshihiko and the two fled from their past lives. Though both faced hardships in their relationship, Yuka truly loves and vows to protect him.

Near the end of the series, she's revealed to be pregnant, but the paternity was never truly revealed. It is shown that before Toshihiko, she had an on/off again relationship with a fellow Shokujinki Gakuto. While Gakuto believes he's the father, Yuka believes it is Toshihiko's. Ultimately, she and Toshihiko raise the child free from their past lives along with Jin, Bon, and Saru as a family.

Voiced by: Hekiru Shiina

Kazuma Momota (桃田 一馬, Momota Kazuma) is the younger half-brother of Toshihiko. After his father's death, he assumes control of the Kifūken school. He aims to rid the world of Shokujinki with the help of a Mecha-like Buster Suit that he has personally developed.

He has an attraction to Rie. Though her feelings are never entirely stated, she is attracted to him but is still fixated on Toshihiko. Near the end, she states she'll stay with him. After discovering the truth of his heritage, he kills one member staying in the Kifūken and comes close to killing another.

He then goes in an attempt to kill Ōba. Only to fall into his trap and die from his injuries after Ōba had his arms surgically removed. Given how long he's been able to live normally among humans, it is hinted that Ōba is the one that brought out his Shokujinki instincts. Most likely with a drug he used on Yuka once, his "medicine," then encouraged Kazuma to eat octopus and consume alcohol, which was hinted to trigger Shokujinki's monstrous instincts.

Voiced by: Hiroyuki Yoshino

Rie Kakinoki (柿の木 利江, Kakinoki Rie) A female member of the Kifūken school where she has also been raised. Once, as a child, she was jokingly engaged to Toshihiko and was very much infatuated with him. Though many, including Jūzō himself, stated that Rie was wasting her time pining for Toshihiko.

Rie childishly believes the toy ring he gave her means a real engagement and isn't above dirty tactics to try and steal him away from Yuka. She even seduces him into an affair after an argument with Yuka. But he quickly regrets it and tries to tell her he doesn't want her. It is hinted that after he leaves her and the group twice, she starts a relationship with his brother Kazuma. After Ōba takes over the Kifūken, she volunteers for an experiment and becomes attached to Kemonozume.

He has her and Yuka drugged and forced to fight. While defeated, she's still alive until Kazuma finds her. Whether because of the drugs or because he had no control over his Shokujinki abilities, he loses his mind and devours her when he thinks she's died.

Voiced by: Shino Kakinuma

Kyūtarō Ōba (大葉 久太郎, Ōba Kyūtarō) A Kifūken swordsman who later took charge of the school's administrative tasks. He has an unassuming role at the beginning of the series but is later revealed to be the main antagonist. In the past, Ōba was shown to be an innocent and kind individual.

But after seeing the carnage Jin did for power, it ultimately shattered him and changed him completely. His motives for what he's done are never clear. He stated he did what he did for his son, so he would be strong and not mocked by others. Another hint is that he did his cruel deeds to be stronger and keep power. One thing is known, he had an attraction to Harumi. An attraction he never acted on, but when he becomes corrupt his attraction is elevated to a sick, twisted obsession. He kept her arms as his and cloned her body multiple times; in a sick attempt to make her his.

Voiced by: Kenji Utsumi

Bon Jōji Ōba Sometimes called "Bon" is a mysterious possibly albino giant sized man, who's a traveling detective. He also has a gift for making origami and gives them as gifts. He first appears in episode 3, apparently sent by Kazuma and the Kifūken to find Toshihiko. He would catch up to the couple in episode 6. Though he seems intimidating because of his height, he's very calm, gentle, and generous. When Yuka believes he's come to kill them, he calmly reveals that he did not come to cause her or Toshihiko harm, only to find them.

He spends time developing a friendship with Yuka at her birthday dinner, and after befriending the couple, he decides to lie to his "employer" about their whereabouts. It is revealed that he's the illegitimate son of Kyūtarō Ōba and a prostitute, only known as "Nana" by her photo. He told Yuka in episode 6, that she died giving birth to him because of his size. He would reappear in episode 10 after Toshihiko loses a battle against Ōba and reveals he also has a Kemonozume; it is hinted his father forced him to take them.

Ōba claims some of his cruelty is to make the world better for "Bon" because he doesn't want his son mocked or weak. However, Bon doesn't feel mocked or weak and doesn't want what his father wants. He ultimately aids Toshihiko to save Yuka and stop his father, stating all he wants is his friends.

He, along with Jin, are one of the few characters to survive. He's seen in the epilogue, apparently vacationing with Jin, Yuka, Saru, and Toshihiko as a family. Now free from their pasts, he's enjoying his time with them. He's seen alongside Jin, as he took photos of Yuka and Toshihiko with their daughter.

Voiced by: Daisuke Gōri

Jūzō Momota (桃田 十蔵, Momota Jūzō) The leader of the Kifūken dojo. He is the father of Toshihiko and Kazuma. In his youth, it is revealed he, Ōba, and Jin were excelled trio students of the Kifūken. He and Jin had a friendly rivalry that lasted long into adulthood. At some point, he was married before though it is never said what happened to Toshihiko's mother; it is assumed she died. With his work, he left Toshihiko in the care of relatives.

Things changed for them when he met and eventually fell in love with Harumi (Yuka's mother). So much that he lost his match on purpose with Jin, so he could become the leader of the Kifūken. This caused a big rift between the friends, as Jin wanted to fight him and win fairly. After Jin tried and became consumed by the Kemonozume, Jūzō was forced to ask Harumi for her arms so he could defeat him and stop his carnage.

His will was apparently strong enough to keep his mind and defeat his former friend. But he later awoke and believed he had lost control and killed many students, along with Harumi. Wrapped with guilt of his apparent deeds, he has arms cut off and wears prosthetics. He was well respected by all the members and students of the Kifūken. And while he wanted Toshihiko to lead the Kifūken; he ultimately told his son to do what made him happy.

He was killed by what he thought was his wife, Harumi. While it is believed that Shokujinki placed the blame on Yuka, there was no proof. When it is revealed at the end that Ōba had used his Kemonozume to take shapes, it is most likely he used his to take Harumi's form and killed Jūzō; himself.

Voiced by: Jun Hazumi

Harumi Kamitsuki (上月 春美, Kamitsuki Harumi) The past love/and second wife of Jūzō and mother of both Yuka and Kazuma. According to her, she left her kind because she didn't want to be like them. However, Yuka was told her mother fell in love with a human (Jūzō) and left everyone; including her own daughter. Only Jin and Ōba knew her secret and made a pact with Jūzō to hide her nature.

She raised Toshihiko like her own child and for a time, the blended family was happy. Until Jūzō asked for her arms, to perform the Kemonozume to stop Jin. Though her arms were cut off, it is believed she still survived. Jūzō awoke to find Jin gone, many Kifūken members, and Harumi dead. Both he and Toshihiko believed he had lost control and killed his wife. It is later revealed that Ōba killed her and at some point killed the others, making Jūzō believe he committed the carnage.

It is hinted that Ōba cut off Harumi's arms off Jūzō, so he could then use the Kemonozume. While Harumi was a dedicated mother to both her stepson and son; it is still never explained why she left her own daughter nor ever tried to contact Yuka. It is possible she is the one who left her with her grandfather but it still never explains her abandonment of Yuka.

Voiced by: Rei Sakuma

Shin Hoozuki A Kifūken swordsman, he stands out for his afro-like hair and how he develops technological weapons for the Kifūken to defeat the Shokujinki. While he's friends with Toshihiko, he and another student Knife Tsutsuji are loyal followers to Kazuma when he takes over the Kifūken. Aside from Toshihiko, he's also the only member of the Kifūken to actually survive the end of the series.

Many of his former members were either killed or turned into Shokujinki from Ōba's proclaimed "medicine" when they left Kazuma to work for Ōba. Knife was killed when Kazuma lost control of his Shokujinki abilities (though Hoozuki hints it could also be because Ōba also drugged him) and ate him.

He also tried to kill Hoozuki but left him when Hoozuki revealed that Rie went to Ōba to have Kemonozume procedure done to her. He's last seen trying to help Toshihiko when he goes to battle Ōba. His whereabouts are unknown after Toshihiko defeats Ōba. It is believed he is alive but no longer part of the Kifūken, since many members were dead.

Voiced by: Anri Katsu

Gakuto Hoobari Gakuto was a leader of a Shokujinki gang and was Yuka's on/and off again lover. He's seen in the first episode, fighting with her over the relationship with Toshihiko. He strongly believed she'd end up like Harumi and that he could only love her. Much to his anger, Yuka still rejected him. Her Shokujinki nature was found out at the funeral of Jūzō. When it appeared the other Kifūken members were ready to kill her, Gakuto came to her aid and fought off the members.

This gave her and Toshihiko enough time to escape together. Though it is never stated, it is possible he hired Himeko try to find information in episode 5. He would reappear at the end of episode 7 and took Toshihiko hostage. In episode 8, he and his gang put him under psychological torture to get answers from him about the Kifūken. There he reveals that lately many Kifūken had been killing his kind, even children that had never ate human flesh. He's also suspicious about what they've been doing to the Shokujinki's arms since the new appearance of a "drug" that he accuses the Kifūken of making. Yuka allows Toshihiko's capture, most likely still feeling hurt by Toshihiko's tryst with Rie. Gakuto wastes no time, trying to win her back and reveals he knows about her pregnancy. He then tries to inquire about who the father is, but she never says. She firmly believes Toshihiko's the father.

When the Kifūken attack their hideout, Gakuto's group is able to get the upper hand on them. He then tells his group to retreat, and stays behind to buy them and Yuka and Toshihiko time to escape. Before leaving, he tells Toshihiko of her pregnancy and inquires if he has a guess as to the paternity. But the pair leave before he can answer Gatuko. Gatuko is last seen trying to fight against Ōba, he most likely died at his hands. Yuka reveals in episode 9, that Gakuto looked after her when she had no one left and it developed into a relationship. She states though that the relationship deteriorated when she felt that he was too bossy and he was trying to control her. It is revealed in episode 11, that Ōba did kill him and ultimately cut off his arms and gave them to Rie for the Kemonozume. Yuka is ultimately broken by the news of his death.

Voiced by: Kiyoyuki Yanada

Jin Kakinoki Jin was a famous Kifūken swordsman, a rival to Jūzō Momota but eventually befriended him and Ōba. The three were considered the best team Kifūken and were supposed to duel as to who would be the leader of the Kifūken. Ōba forfeited, much to his and Jin's shock, Jin won when he fought Jūzō. He angrily accused him of losing on purpose. It was revealed Jūzō lost because he and Harumi had started a relationship which eventually had her pregnant.

Though his reasons were understandable, Jin was extremely angry and felt cheated from the match he wanted for so long. He eventually married Akemi the daughter of a relative to their old master; and became a stepfather to Rie. However, he was very cold and uninterested in being a stepfather to Rie; much to his wife's dismay. Jin was still hellbent on becoming stronger than Jūzō and used an opportunity to use the Kemonozume when Ōba informs him of a village with Shokujinki. He drags Ōba to the village and demands he cut his arms, so he can use the Kemonozume. When Ōba refuses, Jin does it himself, this leaves Ōba mentally scarred watching him.

Though Jin becomes consumed by the power, he unintentionally sets Ōba on his dark path, who sees that this is how the world's meant to be. This causes Ōba to believe that the best way to survive is to be stronger. Though it is believed Jūzō (who also used the Kemonozume) killed him, Bon reveals he's alive in episode 10. It is hinted that Ōba, most likely saved his former friend and kept him alive, to teach his son Bon, how to control his Kemonozume.

Toshihiko meets him in episode 12, but Jin's a broken man from his past and possibly living in hiding under Ōba's influence. He becomes very angry when sees Yuka's photo (because of her strong resemblance to Harumi) and starts angrily talking about how swordsmanship is a lie. Bon is able to calm him when he gives Toshihiko a child's book that Rie uses to ask him to read. It is while he is calmed by the book, it is hinted he regrets how he treated his family and Rie. He would appear in the last episode, taking the mask both Kazuma and Jūzō wore, and stumbles upon Harumi's clones.

He eventually finds the group when they battle against Ōba. He tells Toshihiko he wants to believe in his dreams and tells Ōba he was wrong about believing it was best to be stronger. When Ōba refuses to surrender, Jin confronts him about his feelings for Harmi. It is shown he released Harumi's poorly made clones who attack Ōba, giving Toshihiko an advantage in the battle. Jin's seen piloting an airplane with his prosthetic hands, leaving the city with Bon, Yuka, and Toshihiko. He and Bon both give their approval that Toshihiko should remain with her. He's seen in the epilogue, years later vacationing with Bon and the couple. He's seen taking photos, much happier now and happily takes a photo of Yuka, Toshihko, and their daughter.

Voiced by: Takaya Hashi

Saru (サル) A wily monkey with a liking for peaches. Toshihiko also has a tendency to call him "master" because he believes he possesses incredible skills as a fighter. His theory isn't entirely farfetched, as he has been able to defeat both Toshihiko and Kazuma during battle. He even once undid the screws that held Kazuma's sword together during an attack. He's seen at the end running into a female monkey he mated with. Much to his surprise, he discovers his "mate" gave birth to their children.

== List of episodes ==
No.	Title	Directed by	Written by	Original release date
1	"First Taste"; Transliteration: "Hajimete no Aji" (Japanese: 初めての味)	Masaaki Yuasa	Seishi Minakami; Masaaki Yuasa	August 5, 2006
Toshihiko dedicated his life to only one purpose, to hunt down and destroy the Shokujinki, until the day he met Yuka.
2	"Hard Farewells"; Transliteration: "Shinsan no Ketsubetsu" (Japanese: 辛酸の決別)	Masaaki Yuasa	Masaaki Yuasa	August 12, 2006
Toshihiko's life changes a lot since his relationship with Yuka. He strays away from his training and spends time with Yuka. Eventually, he presents her with a ring (possibly an engagement ring), and he tells her he wants to introduce her to his father, properly. But, before he can do it, his father is murdered. During the funeral, Kyūtarō Ōba, is shocked at Yuka's appearance. Unknown to others, he knows her mother and mischievously grins, knowing Yuka's nature. While the couple talk, Ōba pulls the others aside and tells them of Yuka's real nature. As they talk, Ōba pours a strange green liquid in her drink. Kazuma confronts Yuka and accuses her of killing his father. Though she firmly insists she had nothing to do with it, the Kifūken are set on the idea it is her and decide to kill her. Their attempts are thwarted by an unknown Shokujinki's attack, which buys Toshihiko time to defend Yuka, and the couple escape.
3	"Salty New Moon Night"; Transliteration: "Shoppai Shingetsu no Yoru" (Japanese: しょっぱい新月の夜)	Atsushi Takahashi	Atsushi Takahashi	August 19, 2006
Despite several attempts to stop Toshihiko by some clean-up members of the Kifūken, he and Yuka are able to escape. While staying in a hotel, he discovers that Yuka only becomes a shokujinki when she gets too excited. It is also during this time, the two realize they are being pursued by a giant-sized man all in white. They escape and leave for her grandfather's summerhouse. Again, at dinner, she loses control and tries to attack Toshihiko. Though shaken by her actions, Toshihiko reasserts his feelings for her. It is there she reveals that her mother fell in love with a human and left her family to be with him. She also said she heard that she eventually was killed by the man she loved. Then asked if she ever becomes consumed by her claws, for Toshihiko to kill her. But he quickly tells her it will never happen and vows to find a way for them to stay together.
4	"Bitterness of the Past"; Transliteration: "Kako no Nigami" (Japanese: 過去の苦み)	Hiroyuki Tanaka	Yūichirō Oguro	August 26, 2006
The story goes on a flashback, depicting Jūzō, Ōba, and Jin Kakinoki's friendship. The three rescue the mysterious Harumi Kamitsuki after from a group of thugs and bring her to live in the Kifūken. They eventually discover that Harumi is a shokujinki, but agree to keep it a secret. Eventually the head of the Kifūken announces that he wants one of them to be his successor and will have a duel to decide who is most fit. He also reveals the technique called "Kemonozume"; that involves cutting off one's own arms and replacing it with shokujinki's limbs. If not strong-willed enough, the Kemonozume will make the host a monster. Ōba backs out of the duel, and Jin wins the match with Jūzō. The latter throws the match on purpose because of Harumi's pregnancy with his child. Jin leaves angry that he could not have the real duel he wanted. This led Jin to try out the Kemonozume method, and he became a monster and overpowered the Kifūken members. With no other choice, Jūzō asks Harumi to give him her arms so he can defeat Jin. Both Jin and Jūzō fight as shokujinki, and Jūzō wins the battle. Meanwhile, Ōba puts fire in the dojo. Jūzō awakes to the dojo in flames, many members dead, and finds Harumi dead; along with Toshihiko holding an infant Kazuma. With Jin apparently dead, he strongly believes he lost control and killed his own wife and members. The episode ends in the present time with an aged-old Jūzō apparently seeing Harumi, who quickly turns and kills him.
5	"Woman's Hidden Flavour"; Transliteration: "Onna no Kakushi Aji" (Japanese: 女の隠し味)	Akitoshi Yokoyama	Yūichirō Oguro	September 9, 2006
Ōba exposes his plan to reformulate the Kifūken's organization with the help of Kazuma; who agrees believing with his help he can mold the Kifūken the way he likes. As for Kazuma, he makes his three friends Knife Tsutsuji, Shin Hoozuki, and Souichi Umeda executives. But Umeda's mind goes elsewhere when he becomes fixated on a girl named Himeko who works at an image club. Meanwhile, Kazuma eagerly hopes that he can change the Kifūken and tries to get Rie's attentions, romantically. Though she admits she likes him, it is clear that she is fixated on Toshihiko. The next day, it is revealed that Himeko's real name is Suitsuki Misao and is a shokujinki. Umeda comes to her aid when the Kifūken attempt to kill her; despite their pleas that she is a shokujinki spy. Back at the dojo, Rie discovers journals in a hidden room in Jūzō's old room, while she's looking for financial reports. Much to her shock, she discovers a secret that both Jūzō and Toshihiko kept from Kazuma. Downstairs, Ōba pushes Kazuma to eat octopus (something that is hinted to trigger shokujinki nature more, along with alcohol). Despite the Kifūken's best efforts, Umeda escapes with Himeko, but, at the end, she devours him and escapes.
6	"Spicy Hot Birthday"; Transliteration: "Karakuchi Birthday" (Japanese: 辛口バースディ)	Kanji Wakabayashi	Masaaki Yuasa; Frogman	September 16, 2006
Yuka celebrates her birthday with Toshihiko, but when she tried one of his secret immobilization techniques on him, he ends up paralyzed, just when their gigantic pursuer finds them.
7	"The Sweet Fragrance of Rie"; Transliteration: "Rie no Amai Kaori" (Japanese: 利江の甘い香り)	Osamu Kobayashi	Yūichirō Oguro	September 23, 2006
Rie discovers Toshihiko's hideout and goes all out trying to bring him back home. Meanwhile, Yuka has a surprising revelation. Rie takes advantage of Toshihiko being away from Yuka; after the pair had a fight. She seduces him and the pair have sex. But Toshihiko quickly regrets the decision and tries telling Rie he doesn't want her. Yuka eventually walks on the two and the two girls argue who really belongs with Toshihiko. When both women demand an answer, the group is interrupted by someone's arrival.
8	"Detention Tastes Like Iron"; Transliteration: "Kankin wa Tetsu no Aji" (Japanese: 監禁は鉄の味)	Yūichi Tanaka	Masaaki Yuasa; Yūichirō Oguro	September 30, 2006
Toshihiko is captured and held prisoner by a group of Shokujinki; led by Yuka's former lover, Gakuto. Yuka reluctantly allows this most likely still feeling betrayed from his tryst with Rie. While Toshihiko thinks he's being tortured, they are only mentally tricking him into believing it. There it is revealed that their group has a personal vendetta against the Kifūken and accuse him of knowing of their heinous acts; such as slaughtering one of their villages where the children had committed no bad deeds and then demand to know what they do with the arms murdered of the Shokujinki. The leader hints that lately the Kifūken and Ōba have been selling drugs and accuses the group of using their arms as ingredients. Though Toshihiko has no idea his group was doing this, he claims his innocence. After leaving him to rest, Gakuto reveals her secret. He knows she's pregnant and asks right away if the child is his. Not too long the Kifūken discovers their location and storm the place. Though both sides lose men, Gakuto is able to buy his men some time and tells them to escape. He also stalls so Yuka and Toshihiko can escape. But not before asking Toshihiko whom he thinks the father of her baby is. Much to Toshihiko's surprise as he had no idea she was pregnant.
9	"Sweet Dreams"; Transliteration: "Amai Yume" (Japanese: 甘い夢)	Masakazu Hashimoto	Masaaki Yuasa; Yūichirō Oguro	October 7, 2006
Once again on the run, Toshihiko and Yuka take a hike with a kind old couple. While traveling with them, they try to sort out their feelings for each other. Unknown to them, an unknown vendor sells "medicine" to the elderly couple. And as the couple began to reconcile, they come across "Flesh eaters" and believe they killed the kind elderly couple. During the fight, Toshihiko discovers that they are the old couple. But before he can stop Yuka, she gives into her instincts and kills the old lady and devours her. When it is over, she looks on in horror and shock at her actions. She leaves Toshihiko in disgust of what she's done and believes it means they can never be together. But before Toshihiko can catch up to her, Ōba finds and kidnaps her.
10	"The Misfortunes of Others Are the Taste of Honey"; Transliteration: "Hito no Fukō wa Mitsu no Aji" (Japanese: 人の不幸は密の味)	Kenji Nakamura	Kanji Wakabayashi; Kenji Nakamura	October 14, 2006
As Kyūtarō Ōba put his master plan in motion, he finally reveals his true colors. During a confrontation with Toshihiko, he reveals he's behind the "medicine" thats turning humans into flesh eaters and that he's been using their arms for his benefit. Toshihiko tries to fight him but he's no match for Ōba who's had more experience using the Kemonozume. It is heavily implied that he also uses Kemonozume and had Harumi's arms for the procedure. After the defeat, Toshihiko runs into Bon, who reveals to him that he is Ōba's son . He also reveals his father made him use the Kemonozume to be stronger. But he has no desire to be strong, he just wants to have friends and agrees to help Toshihiko to go and defeat his father.
11	"The Rain Was Bitter"; Transliteration: "Sono Ame wa Nigakatta" (Japanese: その雨は苦かった)	Hiroshi Shimizu	Hiroshi Shimizu	October 21, 2006
With Kazuma still recovering from the failed siege at Gakuto's hide out, it shows the daily life of him and the remaining Kifūken. It is hinted that Rie has developed a relationship with Kazuma and is closest to second in command with Toshihiko gone. Ōba reveals that he plans to seize hold of the Kifūken; much to the shock and anger of Kazuma. Though he refuses to hand over the group, it slowly becomes obvious that Ōba has started a corporate take over. With all but three members have deserted the Kifūken group. Kazuma angrily tries to challenge him but to his shock and others, Ōba reveals his true strength with the Kemonozume. In desperation to bring back their old life Rie volunteers to be a Kemonozume. Though Toshihiko calls her and tries to talk her out of it, she goes through with it. In a drugged state, Ōba performs a "surgery". He cuts off her arms and replaces them with Shokujinki arms. He begins to incite rage into her so she will fight against Yuka. He then tempts Yuka to give into her Shokujinki urges, but even in a drugged state she resists. Up until he reveals that he gave Rie, Gakuto's arms; though he says she "took" them. Completely in shock and broken from the news, he induces her anger into rage and has the two women fight now in monstrous forms. Though Rie eventually loses badly to Yuka. Elsewhere Kazuma discovers his origins and much to his shock, he discovers that Harumi was his mother and makes him a "Flesh Eater". He later calls Knife and begs him to kill him. But due to his consumption of octopus as well as his recent habit of drinking alcohol, he loses control and kills Knife.
12	"Coffee-Flavoured Millet Dumplings"; Transliteration: "Kōhī Aji no Kibidango" (Japanese: 珈琲味のキビ団子)	Atsushi Takahashi	Atsushi Takahashi	October 28, 2006
While Toshihiko tries to convince Rie's stepfather to join his battle against Ōba, Kazuma rushes to fight him by himself. During his travel to the building, it is revealed he "ate" Knife he begged to kill him. And later tries killing another member, but halts as his friend informs him that the "medicine" Ōba gave him turned many humans into Shokujinki and that possibly he's still suffering from the dosage. He also reveals that Rie went to Ōba's building hoping to help get the Kifūken back, thats when Kazuma leaves to find her. Unfortunately for Toshihiko is not having much luck with Rie's stepfather Jin Kakinoki, who's completely broken from the past and influence with Ōba. Just as Kazuma enters the building he finds a badly injured and defeated Rie. She apparently dies and this causes Kazuma to lose control again and he transforms and devours her body. He's shocked by what he's done but is still hellbent on revenge and tries to kill Ōba. Only to fall into a trap set by Ōba, who has his arms removed and they become attached to his legs. Toshihiko and the group come in, after convincing Jin to aid them. But to his shock, Kazuma dies and in his arms. And the final battle ensues between him and Ōba.
13	"Taste Has Nothing to Do with It"; Transliteration: "Aji wa Kankei Nai" (Japanese: 味は関係ない)	Masaaki Yuasa	Masaaki Yuasa	November 5, 2006
Toshihiko and his allies struggle to stop Ōba's ambitions. Ōba isn't above using dirty tactics to achieve his victory as he sends a still drug induced Yuka to kill Toshihiko. Though she injures him, he's able to bring her back to her senses. But the battle is far from over as the group and Bon must stop Ōba's trap thats set to release a gas that will transform people into Shokujinki. As Bon continues to try and stop the trap, Jin confronts a severed head of Ōba on his true motives. While Ōba claims he's done this for his son, Jin accuses him of doing this because he was rejected by Yuka and Kazuma's mother Harumi. During the battle, Toshihiko also realizes that Ōba also killed his stepmother and not his father as he originally thought. After a grueling battle Toshihiko finally wins the battle; though he loses his arm during the battle. He escapes with the others before the government bombs the building and city. The pair are now on a plane, along with Bon, Jin, and Saru. After the destruction and loss of so many lives, Yuka attempts to leave Toshihiko again, believing she'll only bring him pain. She takes a parachute and jumps out, but he quickly jumps after her and confesses his feelings. A small epilogue is shown with the group together in a family like vacation. With Bon and Jin taking a quick snap-shot of Toshihiko, Yuka, and their unseen daughter playing together. And ironically the group is vacationing near the area the couple had been with the elderly couple and though it is still never known whom her father is; Toshihiko's still believed to be the father. And near the end credits Bon's monkey Saru is seen on a fruit cart where he encounters a female monkey he had a romance with and shows she had his babies.

== Theme songs ==
- Opening Theme: "Auvers Blue" by Katteni-Shiyagare
- Ending Theme: "Suki" by Santara
