= Ping Pong (manga) =

Japanese manga series

- First tankōbon volume cover, featuring Makoto Tsukimoto

ピンポン (Pin Pon)
- Genre: Coming-of-age; Psychological drama; Sports
- Manga
- Written by: Taiyō Matsumoto
- Published by: Shogakukan
- English publisher: NA: Viz Media
- Magazine: Big Comic Spirits
- Original run: 1996 – 1997
- Volumes: 5
- Anime television series

Ping Pong the Animation
- Directed by: Masaaki Yuasa
- Produced by: Yuka Okayasu; Yōhei Shintaku
- Written by: Masaaki Yuasa
- Music by: Kensuke Ushio
- Studio: Tatsunoko Production
- Licensed by: Crunchyroll: UK: Anime Limited (expired)
- Original network: Fuji TV (Noitamina)
- English network: US: Funimation Channel, Crunchyroll Channel
- Original run: April 11, 2014 – June 20, 2014
- Episodes: 11
- Live-action film
- Ping Pong (2002)
- icon

Ping Pong (Japanese: ピンポン, Hepburn: Pin Pon) is a Japanese manga series written and illustrated by Taiyō Matsumoto. It was serialized in Shogakukan's seinen manga magazine Big Comic Spirits from 1996 to 1997 and collected in five tankōbon volumes. The story follows high schoolers and childhood friends Peco and Smile, as they compete in the national table tennis tournament where they face talented players from all over the country. The manga has been licensed for English release in North America by Viz Media.

It was adapted into a 2002 live-action film. An anime television series adaptation, produced by Tatsunoko Production and directed by Masaaki Yuasa, was broadcast on Fuji TV's Noitamina programming block between April and June 2014. In North America, Funimation licensed the series.

== Premise ==
Despite having drastically different personalities, high school boys Peco and Smile have been friends since childhood. Now, they are both talented members of table tennis club of Katase High School. Peco gets decisively defeated by a Chinese student and thus becomes so devastated that he quits practicing. Meanwhile, Smile's personality always prevents him from winning against Peco. Coach Jō, however, discovers Smile's potential and tries to motivate him to overcome his psychological obstacle.

== Characters ==
Makoto Tsukimoto (月本 誠, Tsukimoto Makoto) / "Smile" (スマイル, Sumairu)
Voiced by: Kōki Uchiyama, Hiromu Satomura (child) (Japanese); Micah Solusod (English)
Portrayed by: Arata Iura
A quiet and reserved teen. He is ironically nicknamed Smile because of his stoic nature. Smile is an exceptionally skilled player, but often lacks the drive and ruthlessness to win. Nevertheless, his talent is recognized by many, including Koizumi, Kong, and Kazama.
Yutaka Hoshino (星野 裕, Hoshino Yutaka) / "Peco" (ペコ, Peko)
Voiced by: Fukujūrō Katayama, Mitsutaka Nishida (child) (Japanese); Aaron Dismuke (English)
Portrayed by: Yosuke Kubozuka
Smile's childhood friend. Peco is loud, cocky, and carefree. He is initially considered one of the best players on the Katase team, but begins questioning himself after a couple of surprising losses. Peco is frequently seen snacking on various junk food items.
Ryūichi Kazama (風間 竜一, Kazama Ryūichi) / "Dragon" (ドラゴン, Doragon)
Voiced by: Shunsuke Sakuya, Waku Sakaguchi (child) (Japanese); Marcus D. Stimac (English)
Portrayed by: Shido Nakamura
Kaio's team captain and star player. Kazama is a dedicated and intimidating athlete who values winning above all else. His skill and power tend to overwhelm even high level opponents. Kazama attempts to recruit Smile to the Kaio team upon noticing his potential.
Manabu Sakuma (佐久間 学, Sakuma Manabu) / "Demon" (アクマ, Akuma)
Voiced by: Subaru Kimura (Japanese); Anthony Bowling (English)
A childhood rival of Peco's and a member of the Kaio team. Sakuma lacks natural talent but tries to compensate with hard work. He has a combative streak and is fixated on beating Peco as well as proving himself.
Kong Wenge (孔 文革, Kon Wenga) / "China" (チャイナ, Chaina)
Voiced by: Wen Yexing (Japanese); Alan Chow (English)
Portrayed by: Sam Lee
A transfer student from China who was kicked off the national team. His original goal was to return to his home country after redeeming himself abroad. Kong exudes an air of confidence that belies his feelings of shame and resentment.
Jō Koizumi (小泉 丈, Koizumi Jō) / "Butterfly Joe" (バタフライジョー, Batafurai Jō)
Voiced by: Yusaku Yara (Japanese); Mark Stoddard (English)
Portrayed by: Naoto Takenaka
The elderly coach of the Katase team. Though his behavior is sometimes silly, he has a deep sense of commitment to the sport and can be demanding of his players. Koizumi takes great interest in Smile and decides he will force the young player to achieve his potential through any means necessary.
Obaba (オババ)
Voiced by: Masako Nozawa (Japanese); Pam Dougherty (English)
Portrayed by: Mari Natsuki
The retired chain-smoking owner of the table tennis club where Smile and Peco learned the sport as children. She cares for the two young players, despite her outwardly tough and jaded persona.
Ota (大田)
Voiced by: Takanori Hoshino (Japanese); Tyson Rinehart (English)
Team captain of Katase, known more for his unusual hairstyle than his athletic ability. He helps run the family appliance store and is often occupied with odd jobs after school.
Masayuki Sanada (真田 昌幸, Sanada Masayuki)
Voiced by: Kenji Hamada (Japanese); Ian Sinclair (English)
The second-best player on the Kaio team, who secretly envies Kazama and hopes to rival him.
Shuji Nekota (猫田 修二, Nekota Shūji)
Voiced by: Kenta Ōkuma (Japanese); Clifford Chapin (English)
Another top player from Kaio.
Ryū Kazama (風間 竜, Kazama Ryū)
Voiced by: Shinji Ogawa (Japanese); R. Bruce Elliott (English)
Patriarch of the Kazama family, President of Kaio, and Ryuichi's grandfather. He is a shrewd businessman and former professional player who does not tolerate failure.
Taku Kazama (風間 卓, Kazama Taku)
Voiced by: Akihiko Ishizumi (Japanese); Bill Jenkins (English)
Yurie's father and Ryuichi's uncle, coach of the Kaio team.
Yurie (百合枝)
Voiced by: Ayako Kawasumi (Japanese); Lindsay Seidel (English)
Ryuichi's fashionable cousin, who has feelings for him.
Michio Tamura (田村 道夫, Tamura Michio)
Voiced by: Takahiro Shimada (Japanese); Jeremy Inman (English)
Obaba's son, who trains professional table tennis players.
Egami (江上)
Voiced by: Kenjiro Tsuda (Japanese); Eric Vale (English)
A player around the same age as Smile and Peco. He is restless by nature and tends to give up easily.

== Media ==
=== Manga ===
Written and illustrated by Taiyō Matsumoto, Ping Pong was serialized in Shogakukan's Big Comic Spirits from 1996 to 1997. The chapters were collected in five wideban volumes, released from July 30, 1996, to August 30, 1997. The manga was re-released and reformatted into three volumes between July 14, 2012, and August 10, 2012. Shogakukan re-released a two-volume edition, Ping Pong: Full Game (ピンポン フルゲームの, Pin Pon Furu Gēmu no), on April 1, 2014.

In North America, Viz Media announced in May 2020 that they have licensed the manga for English language release. The two volumes, based on the "Full Game" edition, were released on May 19 and September 15, 2020.

==== Original release ====
No.	Release date	ISBN
1	July 30, 1996	4-09-184736-6
01. "Smile" (スマイル, Sumairu); 02. "Peco" (ペコ, Peko); 03. "The Sound of the Wind Gets in the Way" (風の音がジャマをしている, Kaze no oto ga jama o shite iru); 04. "Wenge Kong" (孔文革, Kon Wenga); 05. "Hero" (ヒーロー, Hīrō); 06. "The Old Man and the Boy" (老人と少年, Rōjin to shōnen); 07. "Dragon" (ドラゴン, Doragon); 08. "Kids" (若者たち, Wakamono-tachi); 09. "Butterfly Joe" (バタフライジョー, Batafurai Jō); 10. "'Cause Guts Make the Man!" (男はド根性だかんよ!!, Otoko wa dokonjō dakan yo!!); 11. "Performance" (性能, Seinō)
2	November 30, 1996	4-09-184737-4
12. "Old Man^{2}/Boy^{2}" (老人²/少年², Shōnen/Rōjin); 13. "Inter-high Boys' Singles Table Tennis Qualifying Trials" (インハイ卓球競技予選会 男子シングルス, Intāhai takkyū kyōgi yosen-kai danshi shingurusu); 14. "Boy Gets Angry" (少年怒る, Shōnen okoru); 15. "Take Him Down from the Start" (前で捌く, Mae de sabaku); 16. "Absent Hero" (ヒーロー不在, Hīrō fuzai); 17. "First Game"; 18. "Second Game"; 19. "Third Game"; 20. "Peco vs. Demon" (ペコVS.アクマ, Peko VS. Akuma); 21. "Neptune" (海 王, Umi-ō); 22. "Five Table Tennis Players" (5人の卓球選手, 5-Ri no takkyū senshu)
3	February 28, 1997	4-09-184738-2
23. "Autumn" (秋, Aki); 24. "Dissonance" (不協和音, Fukyōwaon); 25. "Winter Approaches" (冬が近い, Fuyu ga chikai); 26. "Abandonment Blues" (おいてけぼりブルース, Oitekebori burūsu); 27. "Robo-Smile" (スマイルロボ, Sumairurobo); 28. "Wishing on a Star" (星に願いを, Hoshininegaiwo); 29. "Struggles of Youth" (もがけ青春, Mogake seishun); 30. "Trials on the Road to Becoming a Hero, Part 1" (ヒーローになるための試練その1, Hīrō ni naru tame no shiren sono 1); 31. "Question 1: What Does Tsukimoto Need Now?" (問1・月本誠が今、必要としているもの, Toi 1・Tsukimoto Makoto ga ima, hitsuyō to shite iru mono); 32. "My Coach" (マイコーチ, Maikōchi); 33. "Wishing on a Star (Continued)" (続、星に願いを, Zoku, hoshininegaiwo)
4	June 30, 1997	4-09-184739-0
34. "Do You Understand?"; 35. "Tricks of the Trade" (裏 技, Ura-waza); 36. "Spring" (春。, Haru); 37. "Enter the Hero" (ヒーロー見参, Hīrō kenzan); 38. "Let's Play Table Tennis" (卓球しましょう, Takkyū shimashou); 39. "We Are Ping Pong Players"; 40. "See You Later" (再 見, Saiken); 41. "Monster" (モンスター, Monsutā); 42. "Smile Monster" (スマイルモンスター, Sumairumonsutā); 43. "A Straw Shows Which Way the Wind Blows" (一葉落ちて天下の秋を知る, Ichiyō ochite tenka no aki o shiru); 44. "Best Four" (ベスト 4, Besuto 4)
5	August 30, 1997	4-09-184740-4
45. "A Tale of Hot-Blooded High School Sporting Spirit" (學園熱血スポーツ根性物語, Gaku-en nekketsu supōtsu konjō monogatari); 46. "Trials on the Road to Becoming a Hero, Part 2" (ヒーローになる為の試練その2, Hīrō ni naru tame no shiren sono 2); 47. "Kazama's Heart" (カザマノココロ, Kazama no kokoro); 48. "Stars, Moon, and..." (星と月と…, Hoshi to tsuki to...); 49. "Play"; 50. "Fly"; 51. "High"; 52. "3:30-4:00 PM" (Note: "PM3:30～4:00" in the Japanese release); 53. "Resurrection Drama" (復活劇, Fukkatsu-geki); 54. "Ping Pong" (ピンポン, Pinpon); 55. "Spring Ends" (春が終わる。, Haru ga Owaru)

==== 2014 re-release (Full Game edition) ====
No.	Original release date	Original ISBN	English release date	English ISBN
1	April 1, 2014	978-4-09-186089-7	May 19, 2020	978-1-9747-1165-9
2	April 1, 2014	978-4-09-186090-3	September 15, 2020	978-1-9747-1166-6

=== Live-action film ===
A live-action film adaptation directed by Japanese filmmaker Fumihiko Sori was released in 2002. A 4K restoration and Blu-ray edition is set to be released by 88 Films on July 27, 2026.

=== Anime ===
An anime television series adaptation produced by Tatsunoko Production and directed by Masaaki Yuasa was broadcast from April 11 to June 20, 2014, on Fuji TV's Noitamina block. The opening theme is "Tada Hitori" (唯一人; lit. 'All Alone') by Bakudan Johnny and ending theme is "Bokura ni Tsuite" (僕らについて; lit. 'About Us') by Merengue. In North America, the anime series has been licensed by Funimation.

==== Episodes ====
No.	Title	Directed by	Original release date (Note: Fuji TV listed the series air dates on Thursday at 24:50, which is effectively Friday at 12:50 a.m. JST.)
1	"The Wind Makes It Too Hard to Hear"; Transliteration: "Kaze no Oto ga Jama o Shiteiru" (Japanese: 風の音がジャマをしている)	Yūdai Kubota	April 11, 2014
Makoto "Smile" Tsukimoto and Yutaka "Peco" Hoshino are two friends who are part of Katase High School's table tennis team. Peco is talented but regularly skips practice, while Smile attends but shows little enthusiasm for the sport. One day, the two visit Tsujido Academy to observe their new Chinese transfer student and table tennis star, Kong Wenge. Kong finds the two playing in the Tsujido practice hall and notes that Smile loses to Peco on purpose. Kong beats Peco in a game without letting him score a single point before challenging Smile, who refuses.
2	"Smile's a Robot"; Transliteration: "Sumairu wa Robotto" (Japanese: スマイルはロボット)	Hideki Itō	April 18, 2014
Katase's coach Koizumi offers Smile special training sessions in an attempt to ignite his competitive spirit. When Smile refuses, Koizumi pressures him during school to get him to change his mind. Koizumi later meets with Ryūichi "Dragon" Kazama, a student of Kaio Academy and the winner of the previous year's Interhigh. Dragon recounts witnessing Smile's potential at a middle school tournament, wishing to have him join Kaio's team. At the next practice, Koizumi challenges Smile to a match, promising to leave him alone if he wins. While Smile loses the first game, he begins playing more aggressively and causes Koizumi to collapse, shocking Peco.
3	"Devoting Your Life to Table Tennis Is Creepy"; Transliteration: "Takkyū ni Jinsei Kakeru nante Kimi ga Warui" (Japanese: 卓球に人生かけるなんて気味が悪い)	Masatsugu Arakawa	April 25, 2014
Smile and Peco attend the Interhigh preliminaries. Dragon meets with Smile in the stands while they watch Kong's first round match, where Dragon reveals that Kong was kicked off the Chinese national team. Dragon expresses displeasure over how Smile appears to hold back out of consideration for his opponents' feelings, while Smile states that the way Dragon prioritizes winning is "nonsense". Smile threatens an upset of Kong in the third round, but once again holds back, allowing Kong to defeat him.
4	"The Only Way to Be Sure You Won't Lose Is to Not Fight"; Transliteration: "Zettai ni Makenai Yuiitsu no Hōhō wa Tatakawanai Koto da" (Japanese: 絶対に負けない唯一の方法は闘わないことだ)	Fumihiro Ueno	May 2, 2014
Koizumi berates Smile for going easy on Kong, who is shaken by their match. In the third round, Peco plays against Manabu "Akuma" Sakuma, a former acquaintance who used to play table tennis with him and Smile. Akuma wins by exhausting Peco with defensive play. In the quarterfinals, Dragon shocks Kong with his reaction speed and wins their match handily. Kaio takes the top four spots in the preliminaries, and Dragon wins in the finals. After the tournament, Kong is comforted by his coach, Dragon attempts to recruit Smile to Kaio, and Peco cries outside the arena.
5	"Where Did I Go Wrong?"; Transliteration: "Doko de Machigaeta?" (Japanese: どこで間違えた?)	Masaki Utsunomiya	May 9, 2014
Following the Interhigh, Dragon goes on to win the gold medal at the Youth Olympics. Smile has now embraced his new training regimen with Koizumi, while Peco has quit playing table tennis. Akuma, angered by Dragon's obsession with recruiting Smile to Kaio and fearful of being held back by his astigmatism, skips practice to challenge Smile to a match. Smile wins comfortably and tells Akuma that he lacks the talent for table tennis. A frustrated Akuma later assaults a passerby in the street, resulting in a suspension from Kaio and his removal from their table tennis team. Peco throws his racket into a river.
6	"You Love Table Tennis More Than Anyone Else!"; Transliteration: "Omae Dare yori Takkyū-zuki jan yo!!" (Japanese: おまえ誰より卓球好きじゃんよ!!)	Yūdai Kubota	May 16, 2014
Smile begins to build up his reputation as a table tennis player, isolating himself from his Katase teammates as a result. Kong is visited by his mother and holds a Christmas party for the Tsujido table tennis team, while Dragon continues his training to the dismay of his cousin Yurie. Akuma meets with Peco and asks him to keep playing table tennis, pointing out his talent and reminding him about his love of the sport. After seeing a picture of him and Smile holding up a trophies at the local table tennis hall, Peco asks the hall's owner, Tamura, to help him get back into shape.
7	"Yes My Coach"; Transliteration: "Iesu Maikōchi" (Japanese: イエス マイコーチ)	Ryōta Itō	May 23, 2014
Tamura sends Peco to train with her son Michio at the Japanese national team's facility. Dragon visits Smile with Koizumi's permission to make another attempt to recruit him to Kaio. Smile, conscious of his role in Akuma's removal from Kaio's team, refuses. Dragon's uncle tells Yurie about how Dragon's late father, Nori, was blamed for a series of business mistakes, and how Dragon plays to uphold his family's honor. Koizumi recounts to Smile his past as professional player; once considered a favorite to represent Japan in the world championships, he refused to take advantage of an opponent's knee injury during a match and lost, leading to the end of his career. Peco begins to improve at a rapid pace, though Tamura becomes concerned once she sees a bandage on his knee.
8	"Enter the Hero"; Transliteration: "Hīrō Kenzan" (Japanese: ヒーロー見参)	Hirayasu Kyo	May 30, 2014
Tamura meets with Koizumi to sign Peco up for the upcoming Interhigh preliminaries, claiming that Peco's talent surpasses that of Dragon's. Yurie urges Dragon to play table tennis for himself instead of for others. In the second round, Peco plays against Kong. Smile, seeing Peco play again for the first time, calls him a hero. Outmatched by Peco, Kong realizes that he will be unable to fulfill his dream of returning to China and is defeated.
9	"I'm Gonna Go Cry a Bit"; Transliteration: "Sukoshi Naku" (Japanese: 少し泣く)	Ryōta Itō	June 6, 2014
In the third round, Smile faces off against Kaio's vice-captain, Sanada, who hopes to win in order to earn Dragon's respect. Despite falling behind early, Smile figures out Sanada's weakness and defeats him, eventually making it to the finals. Akuma finds Dragon meditating in the bathroom and asks about his reasons for playing table tennis. Peco qualifies for a semifinal match against Dragon, but begins to struggle with his knee. Despite urging from Tamura and Michio to withdraw, Peco resolves to continue playing so that he can meet Smile in the finals.
10	"You're the Hero, Aren't You?!"; Transliteration: "Hīrō na no darouga!!" (Japanese: ヒーローなのだろうが!!)	Eunyoung Choi	June 13, 2014
Peco and Dragon begin their match. Angered by Peco's claim of being a hero, Dragon handily wins the first two games and builds an early lead in the third. Peco imagines Smile telling him to focus on having fun and begins to mount a comeback. Despite being in danger of losing, Dragon finds himself enjoying their match and is able to forget his burdens. As he is eliminated, Dragon acknowledges Peco as a hero.
11	"Blood Tastes Like Iron"; Transliteration: "Chi wa Tetsu no Aji ga Suru" (Japanese: 血は鉄の味がする)	Masaaki Yuasa	June 20, 2014
Before the final, Smile tells Koizumi that he intends to exploit Peco's knee injury, though he notes that heroes do not have weaknesses. Years later, Smile coaches children at Tamura's table tennis hall. Dragon meets with Smile and shares that he has been cut from the Japanese national team in favor of Kong, who has been naturalized and now uses the surname "Tsujido". Peco, who is revealed to have defeated Smile in the finals, now plays professionally in Germany. Dragon wonders if choosing a career playing table tennis was a mistake, though Smile encourages him to continue.

== Reception ==
=== Manga ===
In 2021, the manga received an Eisner Award nomination in the category Best U.S. Edition of International Material—Asia.

==== Critical reception ====
Rose Bridges of Anime News Network gave the two omnibus editions of the manga a grade of A, commending its characters and story. Bridges identified the central relationship between Smile and Peco as the narrative's core, which she described as essential to understanding the ending. She noted that the friendship functions as an emotional anchor for Smile and drives his development. Bridges also observed the manga's lasting influence on the sports genre, stating that its impact is visible in numerous contemporary sports anime. She recommended the omnibus editions for their rewarding character arcs and narrative depth, and praised the art style for effectively conveying the intensity of match scenes while encouraging close reading.

=== Anime ===
In 2015, Ping Pong the Animation received the Grand Prize award for Television Animation of the Year at the Tokyo Anime Awards Festival. The anime series was part of the Jury Selections at the 18th Japan Media Arts Festival in the Animation category in 2014. In November 2019, Polygon named Ping Pong the Animation as one of the best anime of the 2010s, and Crunchyroll listed it in their "Top 25 best anime of the 2010s". IGN also listed Ping Pong the Animation among the best anime series of the 2010s.

==== Critical reception ====
Nick Creamer of Anime News Network praised the adaptation, highlighting its character design, development, soundtrack, animation, and storytelling. Creamer observed that the series uses no extraneous scenes, with each line and confrontation contributing to character growth. He noted that failure is portrayed as a necessary and constructive element, and that the music and sound design are integral to the series's aesthetic. Creamer concluded that Ping Pong exemplifies anime's artistic potential while remaining accessible to a broad audience, and recommended it to both anime enthusiasts and general viewers of well-crafted stories.

Nicole MacLean of THEM Anime Reviews rated the series 5 out of 5, noting that while it is less visually polished than other works by director Masaaki Yuasa such as Kaiba, it distinguishes itself through its character development and narrative. Andy Hanley of UK Anime Network gave the series a score of 9 out of 10, observing that its visual style may polarize viewers, but its storytelling and character handling are nearly flawless. He commended the soundtrack and voice cast for their suitability, and credited Yuasa's direction with elevating the series beyond a conventional sports anime into a nuanced examination of adolescence and ambition. Hanley concluded: "No matter your take on its animation style, you'll be hard-pressed to find a better character study in animated form this year."
