= Lu Over the Wall =

2017 animated film by Masaaki Yuasa

- Theatrical release poster

Japanese name
- Kanji: 夜明け告げるルーのうた
Transcriptions
- Revised Hepburn: Yoaketsugeru Rū no Uta
- Directed by: Masaaki Yuasa
- Screenplay by: Reiko Yoshida; Masaaki Yuasa
- Produced by: Junnosuke Itou; Yuka Okayasu
- Starring: Kanon Tani; Shōta Shimoda; Shinichi Shinohara; Akira Emoto; Soma Saito; Minako Kotobuki; Chidori (Daigo, Nobu)
- Edited by: Ayako Tan
- Music by: Takatsugu Muramatsu
- Production company: Science Saru
- Distributed by: Toho
- Release date: May 19, 2017
- Running time: 112 minutes
- Country: Japan
- Language: Japanese
- Box office: $161,253

Lu Over the Wall (Japanese: 夜明け告げるルーのうた, Hepburn: Yoaketsugeru Rū no Uta; lit. 'The Song of Lu, the Dawn Announcer') is a 2017 Japanese animated fantasy film produced by Science Saru and released by Toho about the eponymous ningyo. It was directed by Masaaki Yuasa, and written by Yuasa and Reiko Yoshida. The music was composed by Takatsugu Muramatsu. It is the second Science Saru film, though it was the first to be produced.

The film was released in Japan on May 19, 2017, It was also released by Anime Limited on December 6, 2017, and by GKIDS on May 11, 2018. Half Symbolic Films released the film on January 31, 2019.

== Plot ==
Kai Ashimoto (足元カイ, Ashimoto Kai) is a lonely and pessimistic 9th grader living in Hinashi Town (日無町, Hinashi-chō) with his grandfather, an umbrella maker, and father. His rock band, "SEIRÈN", was formed by his friends, Kunio (国夫) and Yūho (遊歩).

One day, Kai explores Merfolk Island (人魚島, Ningyojima) and meets Lu (ルー, Rū), the ningyo girl. The music beat allows her fish fin to transform into a pair of human legs. The two strike up a friendship, and Kai takes Lu around the town for a tour. Kai learns that Lu cannot touch sunlight or she will burst into flames. He also learned that Lu has a papa and her mother was killed by a ship. Kai introduces Lu to Yuho and Kuino. When Kai accidentally reveals the secret of the merfolk to the townspeople, Lu's love and power of music makes them dance around town. Despite Kai's selfishness, videos of Lu go viral and she becomes a celebrity. Inspired by her popularity, Yūho's grandfather reopens an old merfolk-themed amusement park on an island near the town. Kai becomes disinterested in the band and begins to ignore Lu. SEIRÈN plays the park's opening, but after Lu arrives and steals the show, Yūho becomes upset and runs away.

Meanwhile, anti-merfolk feelings have been rising in the town, and when Yūho cannot be found by her father, he puts the blame on Lu and captures her. As he threatens her with sunlight, Lu's father comes to save her, which triggers a curse that begins to flood the town. Kai and Yūho help Lu and her father escape, who in turn rally other merfolk to help the town escape the rising waters. In the process of helping, the merfolk destroy the natural cliff which shades the bay from the sun, exposing themselves as the dawn breaks. As the threat of the curse disperses, the townspeople gather themselves and use many umbrellas to save all sea creatures from the sun.

Kai apologizes to Lu and everyone dances happily until all sea creatures return to the ocean. Before parting, Kai and Lu declare their love for each other. Kai starts a new life in town. However, it is understood that Kai and Lu will see each other again in the future.

== Voice cast ==
Characters	Japanese	English
Kai	Shōta Shimoda	Michael Sinterniklaas
Lu	Kanon Tani	Christine Marie Cabanos
Yuho	Minako Kotobuki	Stephanie Sheh
Kunio	Soma Saito	Brandon Engman
Isaki	Shizuka Ito	Alyson Leigh Rosenfeld
Lu's Father	Shinichi Shinohara	Michael Alston Bailey
Teruo	Kenichi Suzumura	Ethan Murray
Chairman	Choo	Michael Sorich
President	Takayuki Sugō	Joe Ochman
Granny Octopus	Yutaka Aoyama	Barbara Goodson
Chief Priest of Shrine	Mutsumi Sasaki	Derek Stephen Prince
Homeroom Teacher	Shingo Horii	H.D. Quinn
Fuguda	Tokuyoshi Kawashima	Kyle Hebert
Nodoguro	Ryuji Mizuno	Mike Pollock
Kameda	Takaaki Seki	Raymond K. Essel
Kujirai	Riki Kagami	Wayne Grayson
Shiira	Atsuyoshi Miyazaki	Jason Simon
Young Grandpa	Reidai Hirabayashi	David Thompson
Esojima	Daigo	Doug Erholtz
Grandfather	Akira Emoto	Steve Kramer

== Production ==
Yuasa announced on his Twitter that he was working on the film in January 2017. It was animated in a hybrid form in which key frames were drawn on paper, but instead of the traditional clean-up and inbetweening still used in most Japanese traditional animation at the time, these rough key frames were then traced and inbetweened in Adobe Flash.

Yuasa acknowledged that Lu shares some similar plot elements and the visual subject of water with Hayao Miyazaki's film Ponyo, and that it occurred to him late into the production of Lu. He considers this due to the influence on him of Miyazaki and Isao Takahata's Panda! Go, Panda!: Rainy-day Circus, which Miyazaki reused elements of himself in Ponyo, and is happy for his works to include such homages to works he admires.

Kazuyoshi Saito's 1997 song "Utautai no Ballad" (歌うたいのバラッド) was chosen to be the theme song of the film.

== Reception ==
=== Critical reception ===
On review aggregator Rotten Tomatoes, the film holds a 78% approval rating based on 45 reviews, with an average rating of 6.4/10. The website's critics consensus reads, "Lu Over the Wall can be more fun to watch than to follow, but director Masaaki Yuasa's distinctive visual style offers colorful compensation for an occasionally scattered story." Metacritic, which uses a weighted average, assigned the film a score of 62 out of 100 based on 14 critics, indicating "generally favorable reviews".

Charles Solomon from Los Angeles Times wrote, "Yuasa's bold imagery and sometimes convoluted storytelling defy the conventions of traditional animated filmmaking, but he is clearly an artist with an individual vision whose work offers something genuinely new and eye-catching."

On the other hand, Simon Abrams from RogerEbert.com said "Still, I can't lie: I was bored throughout the 112 minutes I spent watching Lu over the Wall. I initially thought that I was allergic to the mediocre English voice actors' performances. But I soon realized that that my biggest problem was that I couldn't reconcile the basic disconnect between the thrilling story-telling and the paint-by-numbers story. I wanted the film's creators to do something with their formulaic narrative, but they never did."

=== Box office ===
Lu over the Wall grossed $161,253 at the box office.

=== Accolades ===
Year	Award	Category	Recipient	Result
2017	Annecy International Animated Film Festival	Cristal du long metrage	Lu Over the Wall	Won
2017	Shanghai International Film Festival	Best Animation	Lu Over the Wall	Nominated
2017	Fantasia International Film Festival	Best Animated Feature - Silver Prize	Lu Over the Wall	Won
2018	Mainichi Film Awards	Ofuji Noburo Award	Lu Over the Wall	Won
2018	Japan Media Arts Festival	Grand Prize	Lu Over the Wall	Won
