= Japan Sinks (disambiguation) =

Japan Sinks is a 1973 science fiction novel by Sakyo Komatsu.

Japan Sinks may also refer to:

- Submersion of Japan, a 1973 film adaptation
- Sinking of Japan, a 2006 remake film based on the 1973 version
- Japan Sinks: 2020, a 2020 anime series based on the novel
- Japan Sinks: People of Hope, a 2021 TBS TV series adaptation of the novel
