= Jupiter in fiction =

Depictions of the planet

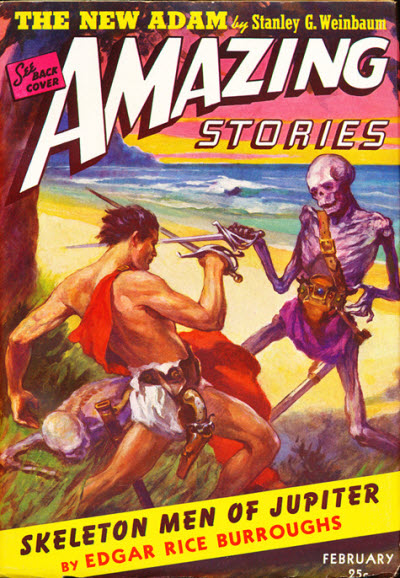
Jupiter appears in many pulp science fiction stories. Seen here is the February 1943 cover of Amazing Stories, featuring "Skeleton Men of Jupiter".

Jupiter, the largest planet in the Solar System, has appeared in works of fiction across several centuries. The way the planet has been depicted has evolved as more has become known about its composition; it was initially portrayed as being entirely solid, later as having a high-pressure atmosphere with a solid surface underneath, and finally as being entirely gaseous. It was a popular setting during the pulp era of science fiction. Life on the planet has variously been depicted as identical to humans, larger versions of humans, and non-human. Non-human life on Jupiter has been portrayed as primitive in some works and more advanced than humans in others.

The moons of Jupiter have also been featured in a large number of stories, especially the four Galilean moons—Io, Europa, Ganymede, and Callisto. Common themes include terraforming and colonizing these worlds.

== Jupiter ==
=== Early depictions ===
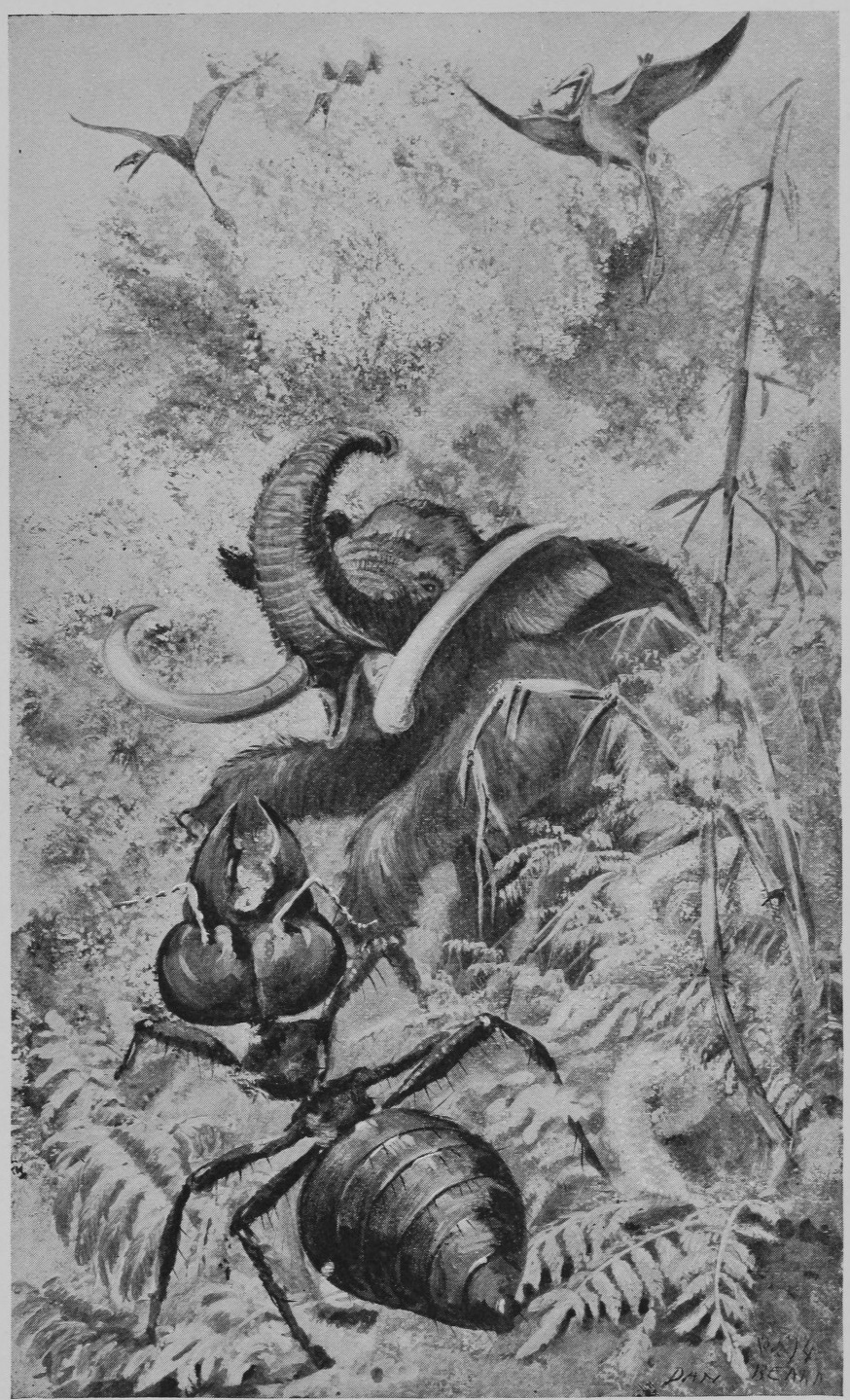
Prehistoric life on Jupiter in A Journey in Other Worlds

Jupiter was long believed, incorrectly, to be a solid planet onto which it would be possible to make a landing. It has made appearances in fiction since at least the 1752 novel Micromégas by Voltaire, wherein an alien from Sirius and another from Saturn pass Jupiter's satellites and land on the planet itself. In the 1800s, writers typically assumed that Jupiter was not only solid but also an Earth-like world and depicted it accordingly. In the 1886 novel Aleriel, or A Voyage to Other Worlds by W. S. Lach-Szyrma, the planet is covered in an ocean with a few islands and primitive aquatic humanoids living there. Jupiter resembles prehistoric Earth with a rich fauna full of lifeforms such as dinosaurs and mastodons in the 1894 novel A Journey in Other Worlds by John Jacob Astor IV. A few utopian works of fiction of the early 1900s are set on Jupiter, including the anonymously published 1908 novel To Jupiter Via Hell and the 1922 novel The Perfect World by Ella Scrymsour.

=== Jovians ===
Most writers portrayed the inhabitants of Jupiter as being human, including Marie Corelli in the 1886 novel A Romance of Two Worlds and Cornelius Shea in the 1905 novel Mystic Island; Or, the Tale of a Hidden Treasure. In the anonymously published 1873 novel A Narrative of the Travels and Adventures of Paul Aermont among the Planets, the human inhabitants of Jupiter have heavier-than-air aircraft. Some portrayed Jovians as giant humans, including Albert Waldo Howard in the c. 1895 novel The Milltillionaire and William Shuler Harris in the 1905 novel Life in a Thousand Worlds. In the satirical 1886 novel A Fortnight in Heaven by Harold Brydges, an Earthling who visits Jupiter finds a futuristic version of America and discovers that the planet is populated by giant counterparts of Earth persons. Others took different approaches to portraying the natives, such as Fred H. Brown in the 1893 short story "A Message from the Stars", where the planet is inhabited by the spirits of the dead, and Homer Eon Flint in the 1918 short story "The King of Conserve Island", where Jovians are winged.

=== Pulp era ===
Jupiter made appearances in several pulp science fiction stories, including the final John Carter story by Edgar Rice Burroughs, the 1943 short story "Skeleton Men of Jupiter". The 1932 short story "A Conquest of Two Worlds" by Edmond Hamilton depicts a human invasion of a peaceable civilization on Jupiter, which leads an Earthling to rebel against the humans and side with the Jovians. In the 1933 short story "The Essence of Life" by Festus Pragnell, a social scientist is visited by human-looking beings from Jupiter who reveal that they have a kind of elixir of life that they are willing to share, but also that they are ruled by octopus-like beings who keep them as pets. Jupiter's Great Red Spot is imagined as a landmass of shifting solidity which is mined for radioactive deposits in the 1936 short story "Red Storm on Jupiter" by Frank Belknap Long, and it leaves Jupiter entirely in the 1937 short story "Life Disinherited" by Eando Binder.

=== Surface ===
As the conditions of Jupiter became better understood in the 1930s and onward, several stories emerged where the planet was portrayed as having a solid surface underneath a high-pressure atmosphere. Some writers proposed that native lifeforms would have adaptations to the expected high surface gravity in the form of a low stature as in the 1939 short story "Heavy Planet" by Milton A. Rothman or a large number of legs to distribute their weight on as in the 1931 novel Spacehounds of IPC by E. E. Smith. Similarly, James Blish posited in The Seedling Stars (a 1957 collection of earlier short stories) that human survival on Jupiter would necessitate pantropy, i.e. modifying the humans to adapt them to the alien environment. In the 1944 short story "Desertion" by Clifford D. Simak (later included in the 1952 fix-up novel City), humans who have been thus transformed find Jupiter a preferable place to live and refuse to leave. Other writers resolved the issue of the presumed-harsh conditions of Jupiter by only having robots go there; in the 1942 short story "Victory Unintentional" by Isaac Asimov such robots encounter hostile aliens who mistake them for living beings, and in the 1957 short story "Call Me Joe" by Poul Anderson, a remotely controlled artificial creature explores the Jovian surface.

=== Atmosphere ===
By the late 1950s, it was generally accepted that the atmosphere of Jupiter was for all practical purposes bottomless and the idea of a solid surface beneath it fell into disuse. Some works portray alien lifeforms living in the atmosphere, including the 1971 short story "A Meeting with Medusa" by Arthur C. Clarke. In the 2002 novel Manta's Gift by Timothy Zahn, humanity makes contact with intelligent life in the Jovian atmosphere, and in the 2000 novel Wheelers by Ian Stewart and Jack Cohen, it is discovered that there are entire floating cities there. Descents into the atmosphere are commonplace, seen in such works as the 1960 short story "The Way to Amalthea" by Soviet science fiction authors Arkady and Boris Strugatsky, the 1972 novel As on a Darkling Plain by Ben Bova, and the 1977 novel If the Stars are Gods by Gregory Benford and Gordon Eklund. The Jovian atmosphere also becomes a location for racing in the 1996 short story "Primrose and Thorn" by Bud Sparhawk.

=== Modern depictions ===
Jupiter is the destination of an expedition in the 1968 film 2001: A Space Odyssey, whereas the book version by Arthur C. Clarke from the same year instead uses Saturn. The planet is transformed into a star in the 1982 sequel novel 2010: Odyssey Two by Clarke and the 1984 film adaptation 2010: The Year We Make Contact as well as the 1982 novel Sayonara Jupiter by Sakyo Komatsu and its 1984 film adaptation Bye-Bye Jupiter, an idea that was later reused by other authors such as Charles L. Harness in the 1991 novel Lunar Justice and John C. Wright in the 2002 novel The Golden Age. The 2015 film Jupiter Ascending is a space opera set partially on the planet.

== Moons ==
Once it was understood that Jupiter itself is a gaseous planet, its moons became more popular settings for stories featuring human or alien life. Occasionally, the entire satellite system has been the focus collectively, such as in the 1984 short story "Promises to Keep" by Jack McDevitt. The four Galilean moons—Io, Europa, Ganymede, and Callisto—have all been colonized in the 1956 novel The Stars My Destination by Alfred Bester.

=== Io ===
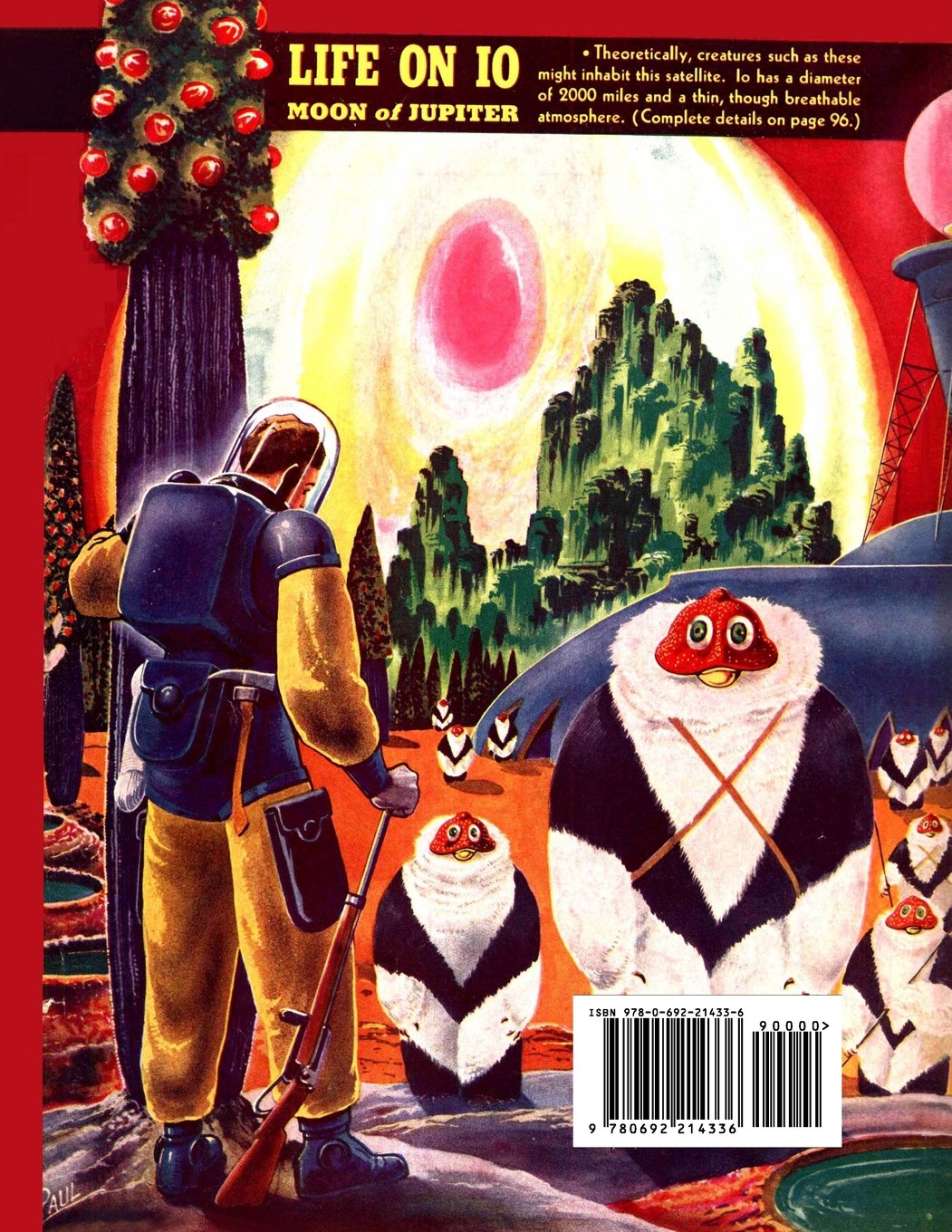
"Life on Io" by Frank R. Paul. Back cover of Fantastic Adventures, May 1940.

Io has a tropical climate in the 1935 short story "The Mad Moon" by Stanley G. Weinbaum. The satellite is mined for resources in the 1981 film Outland, a science-fiction version of the 1952 Western High Noon. In the 1998 short story "The Very Pulse of the Machine" by Michael Swanwick, Io is implied to be sentient. The 2019 film Io depicts the satellite as humanity's refuge after Earth has become near-uninhabitable due to pollution.

=== Europa ===
Europa is depicted as having a breathable atmosphere and native lifeforms on the side of the planet tidally locked towards Jupiter in the 1936 short story "Redemption Cairn" by Stanley G. Weinbaum. The 1992 novel Cold as Ice by Charles Sheffield focuses on a conflict about whether or not Europa should be terraformed. Since scientists started hypothesizing that Europa may have water oceans that could harbour life under its surface of ice, several stories have explored the idea, including the 2008 novel The Quiet War by Paul J. McAuley, the 2013 film Europa Report, and the 2016 novel Europa's Lost Expedition: A Scientific Novel by Michael Carroll.

=== Ganymede ===
Ganymede has domed cities in the 1901 novel A Honeymoon in Space by George Griffith. It is terraformed in the 1950 novel Farmer in the Sky by Robert A. Heinlein. The 1950 short story "The Dancing Girl of Ganymede" by Leigh Brackett is another early work set on the satellite. The colonization of Ganymede has been depicted in numerous works, including the 1964 novel Three Worlds to Conquer by Poul Anderson, the 1975 novel Jupiter Project by Gregory Benford, and the 1997 short story "The Flag in Gorbachev Crater" by Charles L. Harness.

=== Callisto ===
Callisto is colonized in the 1950 short story "U-Turn" by Eric Frank Russell. The 1970s Callisto series by Lin Carter, starting with the 1972 novel Jandar of Callisto, is a planetary romance set on the satellite and an homage to the works of Edgar Rice Burroughs.

=== Other moons ===
Amalthea is a derelict extraterrestrial spaceship in the 1953 short story "Jupiter Five" by Arthur C. Clarke. The 1957 novel Lucky Starr and the Moons of Jupiter by Isaac Asimov takes place on another minor moon of Jupiter, variously referred to as Jupiter IX and Adrastea.

== See also ==
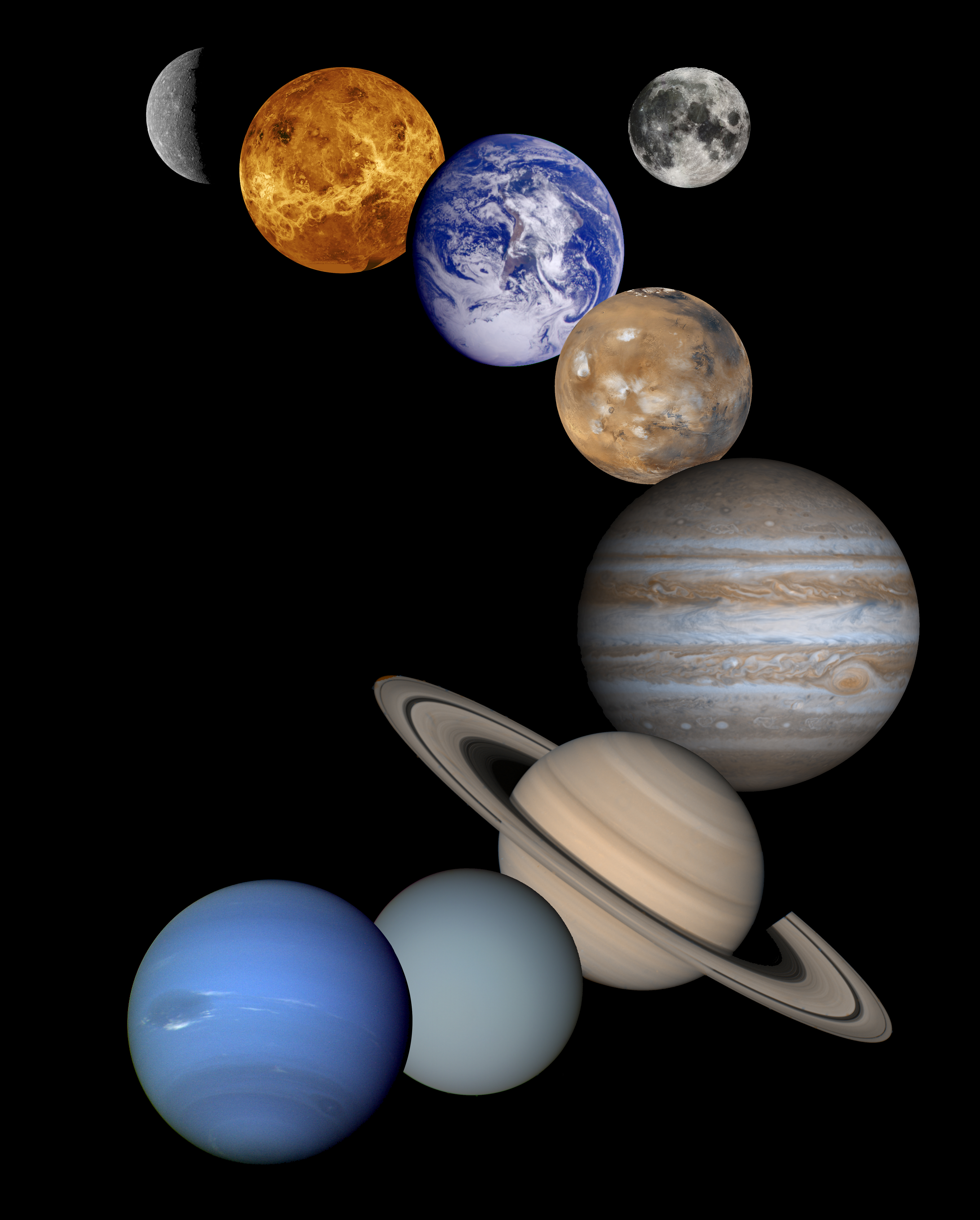
Clicking on a planet leads to the article about its depiction in fiction.

- Solar System in fiction
- Sun in fiction
