= Andrew Hughes (actor) =

Australian actor (1908-1996)

- Hughes portraying Adolf Hitler in The Crazy Adventure (1965)
- Born: January 16, 1908; Ottoman Empire
- Died: September 1, 1996 (aged 88); France
- Citizenship: Australia
- Occupations: Business executive, actor
- Years active: 1959–84

Andrew Hughes (アンドリュー・ヒューズ, Andoryû Hyûzu, January 16, 1908 – September 1, 1996) was a Turkish-born Australian actor and business executive best known for acting in several Japanese films. His most notable role was that of Adolf Hitler in the 1965 Japanese comedy The Crazy Adventure, which was reported to be compelling as he played him as a serious villain.

Hughes has also appeared in films such as King Kong Escapes (1967), Destroy All Monsters (1968), Tidal Wave (1973), ESPY (1974), and Sayonara Jupiter (1984). He also starred in the Hollywood films The Last Voyage (1960) and Flight from Ashiya (1964) (both partially filmed and set in Japan).

== Career ==
Being virtually exclusively active in the Japanese film industry, Hughes was often cast in the roles of various Westerners, often portraying an international reporter, politician or foreign military officer. Not much is known about Hughes's early, pre-acting years, but it is known that he was born in Ottoman Turkey where he originally worked as a career businessman with some small-time acting experience as an extra. Actor Robert Dunham asserted that most fellow Western actors in Japan were in fact of Turkish origin as many Turks had fled to Japan after the Turkish revolution by way of China in order to avoid being drafted to the army. Hughes was ultimately based in Tokyo as an import-export businessman and eventually started making numerous appearances in Japanese films in a career that spanned from the late 1950s to the mid-1980s. As most Westerners appearing in Japanese films at the time spoke little or no Japanese, Hughes was dubbed by Japanese-speaking actors in most of his films.

== Selected filmography ==
Film
Year	Title	Role	Original title	Notes
1959	The Pacific War and the International Military Tribunal	General MacArthur	Daitoa senso to kokusai saiban	
1959	Boss of the Underworld	Casino Guest	Ankokugai no kaoyaku	Uncredited
1959	Submarine I-57 Will Not Surrender	Western Diplomat	Sensuikan I-57 kofuku sezu	
1959	Battle in Outer Space	Meeting attendees	Uchū Daisensō	Uncredited
1960	The Last Voyage	Radio Operator		Scenes filmed in Japan
1964	Flight from Ashiya	Dr. Horton		Scenes filmed in Japan
1965	Honkon no shiroibara			
1965	Crazy Adventure	Adolf Hitler	Kureji no daiboken	Reissued in the U.S. as: Don't Call Me a Crime Man
1966	Water Cyborg	Professor Howard	Kaitei daisensô	U.S. Title: The Terror Beneath the Sea
1966	Ôgon batto	Dr. Pearl		
1967	Las Vegas Free-for-All	Kid Gold		
1967	King Kong Escapes	United Nations journalist	Kingu Kongu no gyakushû	Reissued in Japan as: King Kong's Counterattack
1967	Monsieur Zivaco	Alka Honne		
1967	Scattered Clouds	Canadian Man	Midaregumo	
1968	Booted Babe, Busted Boss	Stonefeller	Hyappatsu hyakuchu: Ogon on me/Ironfinger 2: Goldeneye	
1968	Destroy All Monsters	Dr. Stevenson	Kaijû sôshingeki	
1968	Nippon ichi no uragiri-otoko	General MacArthur		
1969	The Big Explosion	Z		
1969	New Zealand no Wakadaishō	John O'Hara	New Zealand no Wakadaishō	
1969	Latitude Zero	Sir Maurice Poeley	Ido zero daisakusen	Uncredited
1969	Battle of the Japan Sea	Zinovy Rozhestvensky	Nihonkai daikaisen	
1970	Tora! Tora! Tora!	Embassy Delegation Employee of Japan		Uncredited
1971	Be Deceived!	President of Empire Amalgam Technics		Uncredited
1973	Submersion of Japan	Australian Prime Minister	Nippon chinbotsu	Based on the book Japan Sinks by Sakyo Komatsu
1974	ESPY	P.B.	Esupai	
1976	Fumō Chitai	President of Luckyed	Fumō Chitai	
1984	Sayonara Jupiter	Senator Shadllic (Earth Federation Congress)	Sayônara, Jûpetâ	
