= 1964 in science fiction =

The year 1964 was marked, in science fiction, by the following:

== Events ==
- The 22nd annual Worldcon, Pacificon 2, was held in Oakland, USA

== Births and deaths ==
=== Births ===
- Jonathan Lethem
- Andrew Niccol
- Charles Stross
- Joss Whedon

=== Deaths ===
- H. Beam Piper

== Literary releases ==
=== Novels ===
- Farnham's Freehold, by Robert A. Heinlein
- Martian Time-Slip, by Philip K. Dick
- Only Lovers Left Alive, by David Wallis
- Simulacron-3, by Daniel Galouye
- Sunburst, by Phyllis Gotlieb
- Virus, by Sakyo Komatsu

=== Short stories ===
- "The Dowry of Angyar", by Ursula K. Le Guin

=== Anthologies ===
- The first volume of the New Writings in SF anthology is published

=== Comics ===
- Daredevil #1, by Stan Lee and Bill Everett

== Movies ==
- The Last Man on Earth, dir. by Sidney Salkow and Ubaldo Ragona
- Robinson Crusoe on Mars, dir. by Byron Haskin

== Television ==
- The Stranger
- Voyage to the Bottom of the Sea

== Awards ==
=== Hugos ===
- Best novel: Here Gather the Stars, by Clifford D. Simak
- Best short story: "No Truce with Kings", by Poul Anderson
- Best dramatic presentation: No award
- Best professional magazine: Analog Science Fiction and Fact, ed. by John W. Campbell, Jr.
- Best professional artist: Ed Emshwiller
- Best fanzine: Amra, ed. by George H. Scithers
- Best SF bookpublisher:Ace Books
