= Bye-Bye Jupiter =

- Directed by: Sakyō Komatsu; Koji Hashimoto
- Screenplay by: Sakyō Komatsu
- Story by: Sakyō Komatsu
- Produced by: Tomoyuki Tanaka; Sakyō Komatsu
- Starring: Tomokazu Miura; Diane Dangely; Miyuki Ono; Rachel Hugget
- Cinematography: Kazutami Hara
- Edited by: Masaji Ohima
- Music by: Kentaro Haneda
- Production companies: Toho; Io Corporation
- Distributed by: Toho
- Release date: 17 March 1984 (Japan)
- Running time: 129 minutes
- Country: Japan
- Languages: Japanese; English

Bye-Bye Jupiter (さよならジュピター, Sayonara Jupitā; lit. Goodbye Jupiter) is a 1984 Japanese science fiction film directed by Sakyo Komatsu and Koji Hashimoto and co-produced and written by Komatsu. An early draft of the film's story was novelized by Komatsu two years prior to its release as Sayonara Jupiter, which won the 1983 Seiun Award. Akihiko Hirata made his final film appearance in the film.

Bye-Bye Jupiter is notable as the first Japanese film ever to use computer-generated imagery for visual effects.

== Plot ==
In the year 2125, Earth's population has swelled to 18 billion, and mankind has achieved the feat of interplanetary colonization, establishing settlements across the Solar System. A project to melt the polar regions of Mars uncovers massive ground designs similar to those at Nazca. Space Linguist Millicent “Millie” Willem, a member of the Mars project, visits Chief Engineer Eiji Honda aboard the Jupiter-orbiting Minerva Base. Honda is head of the Jupiter Solarization (JS) project, and Millie brings news from the Solar System Development Department (SSDO) that the Martian discoveries may delay his work. Millie describes her theory that aliens visited 100,000 years ago, leaving carvings on the Earth, the Moon and Mars. The messages hint towards a “key” in Jupiter’s Great Red Spot, and she requests Honda’s help with a research trip.

Giving a tour to a delegation from Earth, Honda describes the JS project. Due to the colony energy crisis, and the expense of nuclear fusion, a new power source is required. Jupiter will be turned into a star, thereby providing solar power to all colonies and solving the crisis. The tour is interrupted by protestors from the “Jupiter Church” group, a musician-led cult opposed to the JS project. Honda recognizes one of the protestors as Maria, a former lover.

Honda and Millie take a research craft to the Great Red Spot. Once there, they detect a large rapidly moving sensor anomaly that, according to Honda, was discovered on a previous survey. It is referred to as the "Jupiter Ghost”. Moving in for a closer look, it is revealed as a 120-kilometer long derelict spacecraft, likely the alien ship referenced in Millie’s Nazca research. It is also transmitting a message that they can’t decode.

Meanwhile, Captain Kinn (an old friend of Honda’s) meets with a scientist named Doctor Inoue. Using the spacecraft “Space Arrow,” the pair investigate a region beyond Pluto called “The Comet’s Nest.” It is a ring of dust and ice particles that releases three comets a year. The number of comets is decreasing and they intend to understand why. Forcibly awakened from deep sleep due to a malfunction, they discover a black hole is responsible for the comet reduction, and are killed when their craft is destroyed. Research on the black hole reveals it is headed towards the Sun.

The only way to save the Solar System is to use the JS Project to destroy Jupiter, changing the black hole’s course. It is a race against time that draws the attention of Jupiter Church operatives, while the mystery of the “Jupiter Ghost” looms in the background.

== Cast ==
- Tomokazu Miura (Honda Eiji, Chief Engineer of the Jupiter Solarization (JS) Project)
- Diane d'Angély (Maria Basehart, member of the Jupiter Church and Honda’s former lover)
- Rachel Huggett (Millicent “Millie” Willem, Space Linguist)
- Paul Tagawa (Peter, leader of the Jupiter Church)
- Kim Bass (Booker Lafayette, Deputy Chief of JS Project)
- Marc Panther (Carlos Angeles, JS Project Reaction Team Lead)
- Ron Irwin (Captain Kinn, pilot of the “Space Arrow”)
- William Tapier (Webb, Chairman of the Solar System Development Office (SSDO) and Millie’s grandfather)
- Akihiko Hirata (Dr. Ryutaro Inoue)
- Andrew Hughes (Senator Shadllic)
- Masumi Okada (Dr. Mohammed Mansur)
- Morishige Hisaya (Earth Federation President)

== Production ==
Star Wars was released in Japan in 1978, contributing to that country’s science fiction boom. Its contemporaries included two domestically produced films, Toho's The War in Space and Toei’s Message from Space. Prior to production on The War in Space, Toho offered a contract to author Sakyo Komatsu to write a science fiction film. Komatsu had long desired to make a film comparable to 2001 A Space Odyssey. He took further inspiration from NASA’s Voyager mission to Jupiter and the outer planets. The first draft of “Sayonara Jupiter’s” script was completed in mid-1979.

Simultaneously, Toho registered copyright in the United States. Toho planned a co-production US partners due to an estimated film length of three hours and the involvement of hundreds of foreign cast members.

In 1980, a novel based on the first screenplay was serialized in “The Weekly Sankei” and published in two volumes in 1982. The shooting script was completed in March 1983. Original director Shiro Moritani, who had previously worked on the Komatsu project Japan Sinks, died in December 1984. He was replaced by assistant director Koji Hashimoto.

== Release ==
Bye Bye Jupiter was released in Japan on 17 March 1984, distributed by Toho. The film was never released theatrically in the United States. It was released on DVD by Discotek Media in both an English-dubbed and Japanese-language format on January 30, 2007.

== Reviews ==
Critical reception for the film by English language critics has been mixed. DVD Talk gave the film a mixed review, writing "Sayonara Jupiter will intrigue and frustrate fans of Japanese fantasy cinema in equal measure, while mainstream American audiences will find it insufferably dull and unoriginal."
