= Koji Hashimoto =

Koji Hashimoto may refer to:

- Koji Hashimoto (director)
- Kōji Yakusho, Japanese actor whose birth name was Koji Hashimoto
- Koji Hashimoto (footballer)
