= Tokyo Blackout =

1987 film directed by Toshio Masuda

- Film poster
- Directed by: Toshio Masuda
- Screenplay by: Hiroyasu Yamaura; Toshio Masuda
- Based on: Shuto shōshitsu by Sakyo Komatsu
- Produced by: Yasuyoshi Tokuma; Shichirō Murakami
- Starring: Tsunehiko Watase; Yūko Natori; Shinji Yamashita
- Cinematography: Masahiko Iimura
- Edited by: Toshio Taniguchi
- Music by: Maurice Jarre
- Production companies: Kansai Telecasting Corporation; Tokuma Shoten; Daiei Film
- Distributed by: Toho
- Release date: 17 January 1987 (Japan)
- Running time: 120 minutes
- Country: Japan
- Language: Japanese
- Box office: 760,000,000 yen (Japan)

Tokyo Blackout (Japanese: 首都消失, Hepburn: Shuto shōshitsu; lit. Disappearance of the Capital) is a 1987 Japanese science fiction film directed by Toshio Masuda. It is based on Sakyo Komatsu's novel Shuto shōshitsu, which won the 6th Nihon SF Taisho Award in 1985. The film's score was composed by Maurice Jarre, and special effects were directed by Teruyoshi Nakano.

== Plot ==
One day, Tokyo and its metropolitan area are suddenly covered by a giant dome-shaped and electromagnetic "cloud" for an unknown reason, and the whole thing seemed to disappear and all communications with the outside of "the cloud" are cut off.

Therefore, governments and scientific researchers in various places were extremely shocked and hurriedly organized to study countermeasures. But people are unable to cross "the cloud" into the Tokyo metropolitan area.

The Soviet Navy fleet is getting close near Hokkaido, and the U.S. is forcing Japan to form a new government. So an emergency national governor's meeting was held, and made the national governor's meeting a transitional agency of state affairs.

Scientists outside "the cloud" try to rescue 20 million lives in "the cloud" by using artificial high-power electromagnetic jammers.

== Cast ==
- Tsunehiko Watase as Tatsuya Asakura, General Manager of Hokuto Electric's Technology Development Department
- Yūko Natori as Mariko Koide, freelance journalist
- Shinji Yamashita as Yosuke Tamiya, Kansai Broadcasting Press
- Isao Natsuyagi as Eiji Sakuma, JASDF
- Ichirō Zaitsu as Kawamura, Director of Kansai Broadcasting Press
- Yōko Ishino as Mieko Matsunaga, college student and part-time employee at Hokuto Electric Research Institute
- Raita Ryū as Horie, deputy director, Ministry of Foreign Affairs, International Bureau
- Ittoku Kishibe as Yasuhara, member of Hokuto Electric Research Institute
- Yoshie Taira as Yumiko Asakura, wife of Tatsuya Asakura
- Sei Hiraizumi as Wada, Kansai Broadcasting Society Department Desk
- Shōji Yasui as Ambassador to the United States Otsuki
- Kei Taguchi as Ambassador to the United Kingdom Uekusa
- Renji Ishibashi as Miyoshi, Secretary of the Ministry of Posts and Telecommunications
- Haruko Katō as Umeko Koide, Mariko's mother
- Norihei Miki as Matsukichi Kimura
- Fumio Watanabe as Osaka Prefecture Governor Komuro
- Hideji Ōtaki as Professor Otawara
- Tetsurō Tamba as Representative Nakata

Source for cast

== Film production ==
Approximately 100 tons of dry ice and various other materials were used to depict the clouds. All staff wore dust masks when shooting using fly ash, a building material. In the scene where people are swallowed by the cloud, high-definition video was used for only 20 seconds. The EP-3E reconnaissance aircraft is a modification of the P-3C aircraft model used in The Return of Godzilla.

== Story background and development ==
In 1964, Komatsu published the short story Object O (物体O). The story involves a mysterious ring-shaped object 200 kilometers high and 1,000 kilometers wide, which falls around Osaka, cutting it off from the outside world. In contrast with Tokyo Blackout, Object O focuses on events within the ring.

Komatsu wrote the novel in serialized form, published among Hokkaido Shimbun, Chunichi Shimbun and Nishinippon Shimbun from December 1983 to December 1984. The book was published by Tokuma Shoten in 1985 and became a bestseller that year, exceeding 1.5 million copies sold. This made it the second best-seller for Komatsu after Japan Sinks.

While the film emphasizes family ties and human drama, the novel has a strong political focus, emphasizing crisis management and Japan's vulnerability.

== Plot of the novel ==
The novel begins with Tatsuya Asakura, manager of the planning and general affairs section at the S Heavy Industries Tokyo Headquarters, as he has an unusual experience returning to Tokyo on the Tokaido Shinkansen. Communications and traffic within Tokyo suddenly stop, and the Shinkansen stops at Hamamatsu Station. Here, Asakura meets his friend, JASDF officer Sakuma.

At 7:00 AM that day, a cloud with a 60-kilometer diameter radiates from the center of Tokyo, completely enveloping the city to a height of 1,500 meters. Gozo Otawara, an advisor to S Heavy Industries with PHD's in science and engineering, works with the Central Research Institute of S Heavy Industries and Jonan Medical University to investigate the cloud where Yokohama New Road crosses National Route 16. Tamiya, a classmate of Asakura's and editor-in-chief of Kitakyushu's local newspaper Seibu Shimpo accompanies the investigation.

The cloud is discovered to consist of water vapor and high levels of ozone and argon. It resists all attempts to penetrate it, including bullets. Humans cannot walk more than 20–30 meters inside before being stopped. Radio waves also don't reach inside the cloud, so the condition of Tokyo's inhabitants is unknown.

That evening, at the Atsugi base near the Central Research Institute, an emergency meeting is held between the Self Defense Force and US Forces stationed in Japan, involving United Nations and Ministry of Foreign Affairs representatives. The US forces stationed in Japan urge the Japanese to rebuild the government as soon as possible. Tamiya, inspired by the seriousness of the situation, travels to the Kansai headquarters of A Shimbun and works to rebuild the Japanese government.

10 days after the cloud's appearance, an emergency national governor's conference is held in Nagoya, establishing Hyogo Prefecture Governor Komuro as the temporary chief representative. The organization is formed by a coalition of prefectures and ordinance-designated cities. It consists of prefectural governors, deputy governors, prefectural assembly chairs, mayors of ordinance-designated cities and representatives of Tokyo, Kanagawa and Saitama prefectures. The basis for legal legitimacy is emergency evacuation under international law, with the premise that the Japanese government is out of touch, but still in existence.

Simultaneously, the cloud begins emitting powerful particle beams, damaging or destroying any aircraft or satellites passing above it. An EP-3E reconnaissance aircraft is directly hit by a particle beam, destroying all electronic equipment and killing one crew member from radiation exposure. The United States researches the cloud's abilities for military purposes, while the Soviet Union detains a Japanese diplomat to increase external pressure on the country.

In January of the following year, the Soviet Union sends a large fleet to Hokkaido. A huge earthquake occurs off the coast of Nemuro, and the Soviet fleet is destroyed by a tsunami.

At the end of March, about four months after the cloud's appearance, an international survey of the cloud is conducted. It is determined that the cloud is an automated surveillance device sent by intelligent extraterrestrial life. Shortly afterward, in early April, the cloud disappears as suddenly as it appeared.

== Release ==
Tokyo Blackout was released theatrically in Japan on 11 January 1987 where it was distributed by Toho. It was released in the United States by Toho International on 29 August 1987.
