= Science Saru =

Japanese animation studio

Science Saru, Inc.
- Native name: 株式会社サイエンスSARU
- Romanized name: Kabushiki-gaisha Saiensu SARU
- Type: Subsidiary
- Industry: Japanese animation Character licensing
- Founded: February 4, 2013; 13 years ago in Tokyo, Japan
- Founders: Masaaki Yuasa; Eunyoung Choi
- Headquarters: Kichijōji, Musashino, Tokyo, Japan
- Area served: Worldwide
- Key people: Masanori Fujita (president and CEO)
- Products: Animated feature films Animated series
- Number of employees: 75 (As of April 2026)
- Parent: Toho (2024–present)
- Website: www.sciencesaru.com

Science Saru, Inc. (Japanese: 株式会社サイエンスSARU, Hepburn: Kabushiki-gaisha Saiensu SARU), stylized as Science SARU, is a Japanese animation studio headquartered in Kichijōji, Musashino, Tokyo. Established on February 4, 2013, by director Masaaki Yuasa and producer Eunyoung Choi, the studio has produced feature films and animated series, as well as co-productions, compilation films, and episodes of series for other studios. Science Saru's first animation was the "Food Chain" episode of the American animated series Adventure Time (2014); its most recent projects are the animated feature film Inu-Oh (2021), two short films for the animated anthology project Star Wars: Visions (2021), and the animated series The Heike Story (2021), Yurei Deco (2022), Scott Pilgrim Takes Off (2023), Dandadan (2024) and The Ghost in the Shell (2026).

The studio's work has received critical acclaim both within Japan and internationally, winning awards from Annecy, the Japan Academy Film Prize, the Mainichi Film Awards, and the Japan Media Arts Festival.

Science Saru utilizes a hybrid animation production method which combines hand-drawn animation and Flash animation, a technique not previously used in Japanese animation. The studio was led by Eunyoung Choi until 2025.

== Name ==
The studio's name, Science Saru, translates into English as "Science Monkey". Company co-founder Masaaki Yuasa frequently drew himself as a monkey in self-portraits, but wanted his company to be smarter than a monkey; as a result, he added the word Science in front of Saru with the intent of having a company that possesses both instinct and intelligence.

Co-founder Eunyoung Choi further described the meaning behind the name:

We thought about a lot of possible names for the studio... Science is like logic, business, numbers, plans, technology, and new tools. On the other hand, 'Saru' means monkey in Japanese. As animators, we put in creativity, intuition, art, enjoying moments and being playful... a kind of 'monkeying around'. We want to keep these personalities in Science Saru. Thus, we wanted to create a balance. 'Science' is in English, which highlights being international, and 'Saru' in Japanese maintains traditional anime.

== History ==
=== Founding ===
Science Saru was founded on February 4, 2013 by Masaaki Yuasa and Eunyoung Choi. Yuasa and Choi had previously worked together on numerous projects, and Choi had prior experience leading Ankama Japan, a studio which utilized similar digital animation production techniques and employed a multinational staff. The creation of the studio was proposed by Choi during the making of the short film Kick-Heart (2013), which was the first large-scale Japanese animated project to be successfully crowdfunded on Kickstarter. The studio's first official production under the Science Saru name was an episode of the American Adventure Time animated series entitled Food Chain (2014), on which Yuasa worked as director, writer, and storyboard artist; Choi served as co-director. By July 2014, the studio was also recognized for creating the digital animation for Yuasa's animated series Ping Pong the Animation (2014).

Science Saru's first production location was a small suburban house converted into an impromptu animation studio. By the end of 2013, the company had expanded to a staff of five, including Yuasa, Choi, and Abel Góngora, a former member of Ankama Japan; the studio's first productions began with this small crew.

=== Early work as a subcontractor (2014–2015) ===
Science Saru began its corporate activities by taking on subcontracting work, as well as by collaborating with other studios on projects. The studio's first project was the Adventure Time episode Food Chain (2014). The episode was produced entirely in-house, and Yuasa and Choi were given free rein by series creator Pendleton Ward to develop the episode as they saw fit. Food Chain received critical acclaim as one of the best episodes of the series, was an official competition selection at Annecy, and was nominated for the Annie Award for Outstanding Television Direction. Another early highlight was Yuasa's television series Ping Pong the Animation (2014); Science Saru provided 'digitally assisted' animation production services, while Tatsunoko Production served as the primary studio. The series was awarded a Jury Selection Prize at the Japan Media Arts Festival, and won the Grand Prize for Television Animation at the Tokyo Anime Awards Festival; additionally, character designer and longtime collaborator Nobutake Ito won the Best Animator award for individual achievement. Ping Pong the Animation was subsequently highlighted as one of the best Japanese animated series of the decade. Science Saru also provided production assistance on a pair of episodes of the Bones television series Space Dandy (2014); and both received critical acclaim.

Additional subcontracting work included opening credits animation for several of the animated Garo series (2014-15; 2017-18); animation assistance for Yo-kai Watch: The Movie (2014), a pair of Crayon Shin-chan films (2014, 2015), and Typhoon Noruda (2015); and animation production for the promotional mini-series What's Debikuro? (2014), the music video Song of Four Seasons (2015), and promotional episodes for the American animated series OK K.O.!: Let's Be Heroes (2015-17).

=== Move to feature films (2016–2017) ===
By early 2016, Science Saru had gained experience and built a name in the industry; while still a small team, the company was ready to undertake its first large-scale project. The studio's first feature film production, the family-friendly fantasy film Lu Over the Wall (2017), was produced in less than 16 months using 'digitally assisted' animation techniques. Yuasa directed and co-wrote Lu Over the Wall; it was his first feature film with an original story. During the production of Lu Over the Wall, Yuasa and Science Saru were offered the opportunity to produce a second feature film, the comedy romance The Night Is Short, Walk On Girl (2017), based on the novel by Tomihiko Morimi. Prior to the establishment of Science Saru, Yuasa had directed a television series adaptation of Morimi's novel The Tatami Galaxy (2010); Yuasa had originally hoped to adapt The Night is Short, Walk On Girl immediately after that production, but was unable to at the time. When he was offered the opportunity in 2016, he immediately agreed. This resulted in the pre-production work on The Night is Short, Walk On Girl overlapping with the post-production of Lu Over the Wall. Although Lu Over the Wall was completed first, it was released after The Night is Short, Walk On Girl; this was in part due to a marketing suggestion that it might be preferable for the studio's first film to be based on a pre-existing property familiar to Japanese audiences.

Both Lu Over the Wall and The Night is Short, Walk On Girl received immediate critical acclaim. Lu Over the Wall received the Annecy Cristal du long métrage, the Mainichi Film Awards' Ōfuji Noburō Award, and the Japan Media Arts Festival Grand Prize for Animation. The Night is Short, Walk On Girl was awarded the Japan Academy Film Prize for Animation of the Year, the Ottawa International Animation Festival Grand Prize for Best Animated Feature, a Jury Selection Prize at the Japan Media Arts Festival, and has been listed as one of the best Japanese animated films of the decade.

=== International success and Netflix partnership (2018–2019) ===
2018 was the year that saw Science Saru, and in particular Masaaki Yuasa, achieve international recognition and prominence. Lu Over the Wall and The Night is Short, Walk On Girl, as well as Yuasa's pre-Science Saru feature film Mind Game (2004), were licensed for North American distribution by GKIDS. Most significant to Science Saru's growing popularity was the Netflix release of Yuasa's animated series Devilman Crybaby (2018), based on the manga by Go Nagai. The series represented a dramatic scaling up of Science Saru's production capacity; prior to this project, the company had operated with a limited staff of 20-25 people, but work on the series necessitated expansion, including the hiring of episode directors and new creative talents. Devilman Crybaby was an immediate and massive international hit; with 90% of its viewers outside Japan, the series achieved the largest global audience for the studio to that date. The series inspired internet memes, was profiled by YouTuber PewDiePie, and was widely discussed on Twitter. The series was nominated in 7 categories at the Crunchyroll Anime Awards and won for Anime of the Year and director of the Year, was awarded a Jury Selection Prize at the Japan Media Arts Festival, was cited by Vulture as containing one of the 100 most influential sequences in global animation history, and was listed as one of the best Japanese animated series of the decade.

In 2019, Science Saru produced Yuasa's next feature film, the romance Ride Your Wave (2019). An original story, the film earned Science Saru the studio's best reviews to date. Ride Your Wave was an official competition selection at Annecy, was nominated for the Mainichi Film Award for Best Animation Film, was nominated for Annie Awards in the categories of Best Indie Feature and Outstanding Feature Film Direction, received a Jury Selection Prize at the Japan Media Arts Festival, and won Best Animated Feature Film awards at the Shanghai International Film Festival, Fantasia International Film Festival, and Sitges Film Festival. Also in 2019, Science Saru produced the series Super Shiro (2019), an installment of the popular Crayon Shin-chan franchise created by Yoshito Usui. The series was directed by Yuasa and veteran animator Tomohisa Shimoyama (making his directorial debut). Yuasa's involvement was the culmination of a long association with Crayon Shin-chan, having first animated for the franchise in the 1990s. The end of the year saw the 2010s heralded as Masaaki Yuasa's "breakout decade"; collectively, Devilman crybaby and the release of Yuasa's films in the United States led to him being highlighted as one of the most important and exciting directors in animation.

In 2020, Science Saru produced the comedy television series Keep Your Hands Off Eizouken! (2020). Directed by Yuasa and based on the manga by Sumito Ōwara, the series boosted sales of the original manga, inspired internet memes, and won the Japanese Broadcast Critics Association's monthly Galaxy Award during its broadcast run. Following the conclusion of the broadcast, Keep Your Hands Off Eizouken! received critical acclaim as one of the best Japanese animated series of both the season that it aired and the year as a whole, and was recognized by The New York Times and The New Yorker as one of the best television series of 2020. The series was nominated in 10 categories at the Crunchyroll Anime Awards and won for Director of the Year and Best Animation, was awarded the Grand Prize for Television Animation at the Tokyo Anime Awards Festival, and received the Japan Media Arts Festival Grand Prize for Animation. Later that year, Science Saru produced the Netflix series Japan Sinks: 2020 (2020), based on the disaster novel by Sakyo Komatsu. Yuasa directed in conjunction with Pyeon-Gang Ho, who made her directorial debut with the series. The series attracted criticism within Japan for its condemnation of Japanese nationalism, but also received positive attention for its multiculturalism and inclusiveness, and was named as one of the best Japanese animated series of 2020. The first episode of the series was awarded the Annecy Jury Prize for a Television Series, and the series as a whole received two nominations at the Crunchyroll Anime Awards. A film compilation version of the series was subsequently released in Japanese theaters in November 2020, and was awarded a Jury Selection Prize at the Japan Media Arts Festival.

=== New CEO and COVID-19 (2020–2023) ===
On March 25, 2020, Masaaki Yuasa stepped down as president and representative director of Science Saru. Yuasa cited his desire to take a rest from directing after seven years of continuous work, but reaffirmed his commitment to completing additional projects with Science Saru in the future. Eunyoung Choi subsequently became CEO and president of the studio. She likewise affirmed Yuasa's continued involvement with the company as a creator, and noted that the studio will look to develop additional projects with other directors. During the 2020 COVID-19 pandemic, Science Saru was able to adjust quickly and continue production, despite much of the Japanese animation industry being affected. In October 2020, Science Saru entered into a non-exclusive strategic partnership with Netflix covering the development of new series and content.

In early 2021, Yuasa was recognized by the Japanese government's Agency for Cultural Affairs, which awarded him the Cabinet Minister Award for Media Fine Arts for his significant career achievements with Science Saru, as well as for his works prior to establishing the studio. Later that year, Yuasa was further recognized with the Medal of Honor with Purple Ribbon by the Japanese government in recognition of his distinguished contributions to artistic and cultural development.

In fall 2021, Science Saru released a pair of interrelated projects: the Masaaki Yuasa feature film Inu-Oh (2021), and the animated television series The Heike Story (2021). Based on the novel by Hideo Furukawa and featuring character designs by Ping Pong creator Taiyō Matsumoto, Inu-Oh is a musical drama film set during the 14th Century in Japan which centers on the unique and unexpected friendship between two traveling Noh performers. The film premiered at the 78th Venice International Film Festival on September 9, 2021, with a worldwide theatrical release to follow in 2022. The film was licensed for North American theatrical and home-video distribution by GKIDS, and was released in US theaters in August 2022. Upon its debut on the international festival circuit, Inu-Oh received immediate critical acclaim and excellent reviews from international critics, was nominated for the Golden Globe Award for Best Animated Feature Film, and won the Mainichi Film Awards' Ōfuji Noburō Award and the Best Animated Feature Film award at the Fantasia International Film Festival. Produced simultaneously with Inu-Oh, the television series The Heike Story adapts author Hideo Furukawa's translation of the epic ancient Japanese historical narrative The Tale of the Heike. The series was directed by Naoko Yamada and focuses on both the politics and devastation of the Genpei War, a cataclysmic civil war in the 12th Century that divided Japan, and the personal lives and tragedies of the women of both warring clans who are caught up in the conflict. The series premiered on September 15, 2021 in North America on the Funimation streaming service, with premieres the following day on the Japanese streaming service FOD (operated by Fuji TV) and the Chinese streaming service Bilibili; a Japanese television broadcast on Fuji TV's +Ultra programming block followed in January 2022. Following the conclusion of its streaming release, The Heike Story was named one of the best series of 2021, and was nominated in 3 categories for the 2022 Anime Trending Awards.

Additionally, in September 2021, Science Saru produced two short films for the animated anthology project Star Wars: Visions (2021). The shorts, entitled Akakiri and T0-B1, were part of a nine-film anthology of shorts, all of which premiered on September 22 worldwide on Disney+. Akakiri was directed by Eunyoung Choi and centers on the story of a princess and a Jedi, while T0-B1 was directed by Abel Góngora and follows the adventures of a droid who dreams of becoming a Jedi and exploring the galaxy. The anthology as a whole received stellar reviews, with Science Saru's films highlighted as particular standouts. Star Wars: Visions was heralded as one of the best animated projects of the year, as well as one of the best Star Wars titles in a decade or more. Episodes of the anthology project were also nominated for multiple awards.

In 2022, Science Saru released the original television animation series Yurei Deco. Directed by Tomohisa Shimoyama, written by Dai Satō, and based on a concept by Masaaki Yuasa, the series drew inspiration from Mark Twain's The Adventures of Huckleberry Finn and premiered to excellent reviews.

Science Saru's following project was an animated adaptation of the novel Tatami Time Machine Blues. Based on the novel of the same name written by Tomihiko Morimi and derived from a concept by Makoto Ueda, Tatami Time Machine Blues serves as a sequel to The Tatami Galaxy, which Yuasa adapted as a television series in April 2010, prior to the establishment of Science Saru. The project was directed by Shingo Natsume, while screenwriter Makoto Ueda, character designer Yusuke Nakamura, and the majority of the original Japanese voice cast reprise their creative roles from The Tatami Galaxy. The project initially debuted as a series on Disney+ in 2022, with a theatrical compilation film following later that year; the Disney+ release included an original episode that was not part of the theatrical compilation.

=== Toho subsidiary (2024–present) ===
On May 23, 2024, it was announced that Toho would buy all of Science SARU's shares and make it a subsidiary, which was completed by June 19 the same year.

== Style and studio environment ==
Science Saru utilizes a combination of traditional hand drawn animation and digital animation created using multiple software programs, including Adobe Animate. The studio refers to its animation production method and resultant style as 'digitally assisted animation.' When utilizing 'digitally assisted animation', the initial animation work, called key animation (where the key poses of movement are established), is drawn by hand, and then recreated digitally for the stages of inbetween animation (used to create smooth movement by filling in the gaps between keyframe poses), as well as for coloring. The advantage of this production technique is increased efficiency, allowing projects to be completed faster and with a smaller crew; the small team focus allows for a strong understanding of the director's artistic vision. This approach to animation production has won praise from creators and industry publications.

Science Saru's diversity is also unique among Japanese animation studios: it employs a multicultural animation staff. According to Choi, staff are chosen based on skill regardless of national origin, and the inclusion of global perspectives helps create more well-rounded stories.

== Feature films ==
For the purposes of the list below, all films and series upon which Science Saru worked are listed. Titles which Science Saru produced or co-produced are shaded in grey; titles for which the studio served as a subcontractor are shaded in yellow.

Year	Title	Director(s)	Screenwriter(s)	Producer(s)	Music	RT	Notes
2014	Crayon Shin-chan: Intense Battle! Robo Dad Strikes Back	Wataru Takahashi	Kazuki Nakashima	Kensuke Suzuki, Takahiro Kishimoto, Tomoharu Matsuhisa & Yuki Yoshida	Shinji Miyazaki & Toshiyuki Arakawa	N/A	Animation assistance ("Giant Hiroshi Robot Battle" Sequence); primary studio was Shin-Ei Animation
2014	Yo-kai Watch: The Movie	Shigeharu Takahashi & Shinji Ushiro	Yoichi Kato	Izumi Furusawa, Kiyofumi Kajiwara & Makoto Wada	Ken'ichirō Saigō	80%	Animation assistance; primary studio was OLM
2015	Crayon Shin-chan: My Moving Story! Cactus Large Attack!	Masakazu Hashimoto	Kimiko Ueno	Hiromi Nakaseko, Kensuke Suzuki, Masashi Yagi, Yuki Yoshida	Kazuhiko Sawaguchi & Toshiyuki Arakawa	N/A	Animation assistance; primary studio was Shin-Ei Animation
2015	Typhoon Noruda	Yōjirō Arai	N/A	Noriko Ozaki & Katsuhiro Takei	Masashi Hamauzu	N/A	Key animation; primary studio was Studio Colorido
2017	The Night Is Short, Walk On Girl	Masaaki Yuasa	Makoto Ueda	Jūnosuke Itō & Noriko Ozaki	Michiru Ōshima	90%	Based on the novel written by Tomihiko Morimi and illustrated by Yusuke Nakamura
2017	Lu Over the Wall	Masaaki Yuasa	Yuasa & Reiko Yoshida	Jūnosuke Itō & Yuka Okayasu	Takatsugu Muramatsu	78%	Original story
2019	Ride Your Wave	Masaaki Yuasa	Reiko Yoshida	Eunyoung Choi & Yuka Okayasu	Michiru Ōshima	93%	Original story
2020	Japan Sinks: 2020 Theatrical Edition	Masaaki Yuasa	Toshio Yoshitaka	Eunyoung Choi, Kazuhito Matsushima, Noriyasu Ueki & Kensuke Zushi	Kensuke Ushio	N/A	Compilation film of the series of the same name; based on the novel written by Sakyo Komatsu
2021	Inu-Oh	Masaaki Yuasa	Akiko Nogi	Eunyoung Choi & Fumie Takeuchi	Yoshihide Otomo	85%	Based on the novel written by Hideo Furukawa
2022	Tatami Time Machine Blues – Theatrical Compilation Film	Shingo Natsume	Makoto Ueda	Fumie Takeuchi, Noriko Ozaki, Eunyoung Choi & Hana Sugawara	Michiru Ōshima	N/A	Compilation film of the series of the same name; based on the novel written by Tomihiko Morimi from an original concept by Makoto Ueda
2024	The Colors Within	Naoko Yamada	Reiko Yoshida	Wakana Okamura & Kōhei Sakita	Kensuke Ushio	92%	Original story

== Animated series ==
For the purposes of the list below, all films and series upon which Science Saru worked are listed. Titles which Science Saru produced or co-produced are shaded in grey; titles for which the studio served as a subcontractor are shaded in yellow.

Year	Title	Network	Director(s)	Screenwriter(s)	Producer(s)	Music	RT	Notes
2014	Adventure Time: Food Chain	Cartoon Network	Masaaki Yuasa & Eunyoung Choi (creative director)	Yuasa	Choi & Yuasa	Soichi Terada	N/A	Episode of the series created by Pendleton Ward and produced by Cartoon Network Studios; produced in-house by Science Saru
2014	Ping Pong The Animation	Fuji TV	Masaaki Yuasa	Yuasa (series composition & screenplay)	Yuka Okayasu, Yōhei Shintaku & Tsutomu Fujio (animation producer)	Kensuke Ushio	N/A	Based on the manga written and illustrated by Taiyō Matsumoto; 'digitally assisted' animation produced in cooperation with Tatsunoko Production
2014	Space Dandy	Tokyo MX	Shinichirō Watanabe (chief director) & Shingo Natsume; Eunyoung Choi (episode 9) & Masaaki Yuasa (episode 16)	Choi (episode 9) & Yuasa (episode 16)	Hirofumi Inagaki, Hirotsugu Ogisu, Masahiko Minami, Motoki Mukaichi, Yukako Inoue & Yukihiro Ito	Hiroyuki Namba, KenKen, Tucker, Noriyoshi Sasanuma, Yasuyuki Okamura & Dokaka (episode 9); Taku Takahashi, Mountain Mocha Kilimanjaro, Tucker, Latin Quarters & Yoko Kanno (episode 16)	83%	Animation production cooperation (episode 9 uncredited; episode 16 credited); primary studio was Bones
2014	What's Debikuro? – Promotional Episodes	N/A	Eunyoung Choi (episodes 1-3)	Mitsuru Kurosumi (episodes 1-3)	N/A	N/A	N/A	Promotional episodes for the live-action film Miracle: Devil Claus' Love and Magic
2014–15	Garo: The Animation	TV Tokyo	Yuichiro Hayashi	Yasuko Kobayashi (series composition)	Takahiro Suzuki	monaca	N/A	Animation (opening credit sequence 2, episodes 13-25); primary studio was MAPPA
2016–17	OK K.O.!: Let's Be Heroes – Promotional Episodes	Cartoon Network	Abel Góngora & Juan Manuel Laguna (episodes 1, 4, 8)	Toby Jones & Stu Livingston (episode 1), Ryann Shannon (episodes 4, 8)	N/A	N/A	N/A	Promotional episodes of the series created by Ian Jones-Quartey and produced by Cartoon Network Studios; animation production services (episodes 1, 4, 8)
2017–18	Garo: Vanishing Line	TV Tokyo	Sunghoo Park	Kiyoko Yoshimura (series composition)	N/A	monaca	N/A	Animation (opening credit sequences 1 & 2, episodes 1-24); primary studio was MAPPA
2018	Devilman Crybaby	Netflix	Masaaki Yuasa	Ichirō Ōkouchi (series composition & screenplay)	Ichinao Nagai & Yōhei Shintaku	Kensuke Ushio	89%	Based on the manga written and illustrated by Go Nagai
2019–20	Super Shiro	Abema	Masaaki Yuasa, Tomohisa Shimoyama (chief director)	Kimiko Ueno (series composition)	Eunyoung Choi, Takanobu Sano, Kensuke Suzuki, Rika Tsurusaki & Yuki Yoshida	Kenta Higashiohji & Akifumi Tada	N/A	Inspired by the manga and anime series Crayon Shin-chan created by Yoshito Usui
2020	Keep Your Hands Off Eizouken!	NHK G	Masaaki Yuasa	Yuasa (series composition), Yūichirō Kido (screenplay)	Eunyoung Choi, Junya Okamoto, Jun Sakata & Shinya Tsuruoka	Oorutaichi	N/A	Based on the manga written and illustrated by Sumito Ōwara
2020	Japan Sinks: 2020	Netflix	Masaaki Yuasa, Pyeon-Gang Ho (series director)	Toshio Yoshitaka (series composition)	Eunyoung Choi, Kazuhito Matsushima, Noriyasu Ueki & Kensuke Zushi	Kensuke Ushio	72%	Based on the novel written by Sakyo Komatsu
2021	The Heike Story	Fuji TV	Naoko Yamada	Reiko Yoshida (screenplay)	Eunyoung Choi, Fumie Takeuchi, Mayo Arita, Noriko Ozaki & Shinichi Nakamura	Kensuke Ushio	N/A	Based on The Tale of the Heike, as translated by Hideo Furukawa
2021	Star Wars: Visions (two short films: Akakiri and T0-B1)	Disney+	Eunyoung Choi (Akakiri), Abel Góngora (T0-B1)	Yuichiro Kido	Eunyoung Choi (executive producer), Kohei Sakita	U-zhann (Akakiri); Keiichiro Shibuya & A-bee (T0-B1)	96%	Based on the Star Wars franchise created by George Lucas
2022	Yurei Deco	Tokyo MX	Tomohisa Shimoyama	Dai Satō (series composition & original concept), Masaaki Yuasa (original concept)	Cong Cao, Kishirō Hyakutake, Kōhei Sakita & Lily Kim	Mito, Kōtarō Saitō, Yebisu303	N/A	Original story
2022	Tatami Time Machine Blues	Disney+	Shingo Natsume	Makoto Ueda (series composition)	Fumie Takeuchi, Noriko Ozaki, Eunyoung Choi & Hana Sugawara	Michiru Ōshima	N/A	Based on the novel written by Tomihiko Morimi from an original concept by Makoto Ueda
2023	Scott Pilgrim Takes Off	Netflix	Abel Góngora	Bryan Lee O'Malley, BenDavid Grabinski	Eunyoung Choi	Joseph Trapanese, Anamanaguchi	98%	Based on the Scott Pilgrim graphic novels by Bryan Lee O'Malley
2024	Dandadan	MBS, TBS	Fūga Yamashiro	Hiroshi Seko (series composition & screenplay)	TBA	Kensuke Ushio	100%	Based on the manga series of the same name written and illustrated by Yukinobu Tatsu
2025	Dandadan (season 2)	MBS, TBS	Fūga Yamashiro; Abel Góngora	Hiroshi Seko (series composition & screenplay)	TBA	Kensuke Ushio	TBA	Second season of Dandadan.
2025	Sanda	MBS, TBS	Tomohisa Shimoyama	Kimiko Ueno (series composition & screenplay)	TBA	Tomoyuki Tanaka	TBA	Based on the manga written and illustrated by Paru Itagaki
2026	Jaadugar: A Witch in Mongolia	TV Asahi	Naoko Yamada (chief director), Abel Góngora	Kanichi Katō (series composition)	TBA	Koshiro Hino	TBA	Based on the manga written and illustrated by Tomato Soup
2026	The Ghost in the Shell	Kansai TV, Fuji TV	Mokochan	Toh EnJoe	TBA	Taisei Iwasaki, Ryō Konishi, Yuki Kanesaka	TBA	Based on the manga written and illustrated by Masamune Shirow
2027	Dandadan (season 3)	MBS, TBS	TBA	TBA	TBA	TBA	TBA	Third season of Dandadan.

== Awards and acclaim ==
Science Saru's projects have received significant global acclaim. The studio's works have been recognized by the Annecy International Animated Film Festival (2 wins, 2 nominations), the Japan Academy Film Prize Association (1 win), the Golden Globe Awards (1 nomination), the Mainichi Film Awards (2 wins, 1 nomination), the Japan Media Arts Festival (2 wins, 5 jury selections), the Tokyo Anime Awards (3 wins), the Crunchyroll Anime Awards (4 wins, 16 nominations), the Ottawa International Animation Festival (1 win, 1 nomination), the Shanghai International Film Festival (1 win, 1 nomination) the Sitges Film Festival (1 win, 2 nominations), the Fantasia International Film Festival (2 wins, 1 silver, 1 bronze), the Satellite Awards (1 nomination), and the Annie Awards (3 nominations).

== Staff ==
As of this date, principal company staff include:

=== Current company members ===
- Eunyoung Choi (Founder, President & CEO)
- Abel Góngora (Creative Team Director, Flash Animation Chief)

=== Associated creators ===
- Masaaki Yuasa (Founder, Director)
- Tomohisa Shimoyama (Director)
- Naoko Yamada (Director)
