= Mao Daichi =

Japanese actress (born 1956)

- 大地 真央
- Born: Mayumi Tada; February 5, 1956 (age 70); Sumoto, Hyōgo, Japan
- Other names: Mao; Mami
- Occupation: Actress
- Years active: 1973–present
- Known for: Romeo and Juliet; Guys and Dolls; A Tale of Two Cities; Gone with the Wind; Carmen; My Fair Lady; The Sound of Music; Roman Holiday; Takeda Shingen; Sinking of Japan
- Spouses: Ken Matsudaira (m. 1990; div. 2004); Yasumichi Morita (m. 2007)
- Awards: 15th Kazuo Kikuta Theater Award (My Fair Lady); 24th Agency Cultural Affairs Arts Festival Award Grand Prix 1998 (Roman Holiday); 24th Kazuo Kikuta Theater Award (Roman Holiday); 22nd Matsuo Performing Arts Theater Excellence Award (Roman Holiday, Mitsuko, Once Upon a Mattress); 36th Kazuo Kikuta Theater Award (My Fair Lady)
- Website: Official website

Mayumi Morita (森田 真裕美, Morita Mayumi; née Tada (多田), born February 5, 1956), better known as Mao Daichi (大地 真央, Daichi Mao), is a Japanese actress and former Top Star otokoyaku (an actress who plays male roles) of the Japanese Takarazuka Revue's Moon Troupe.

Her nicknames are Mao (真央) and Mami (マミ).

== Experience ==
=== Stage ===
Year	Title	Role	Notes
1978	Marius	Marius	Takarazuka era
1981	DEAN	James Dean	Takarazuka era
1984	A Tale of Two Cities	Sydney Carton	Takarazuka era
1985	Guys and Dolls	Sky Masterson	Takarazuka era
1986	The Unsinkable Molly Brown	Margaret Brown	
1986	Twelfth Night	Viola, Sebastian	
1987	Gone with the Wind	Scarlett	
1987	The Prince and the Showgirl	Mary	
1989	Carmen	Carmen	
1989	Anything Goes	Reno Sweeny	
1990	My Fair Lady	Eliza	
1990	Anything Goes	Reno Sweeny	
1990	On the Twentieth Century	Lily Garland	
1991	Anything Goes	Reno Sweeny	
1992	The Sound of Music	Maria	
1993	My Fair Lady	Eliza	
1993	Lady, Be Good	Susie	
1994	My Fair Lady	Eliza	
1995	The Sound of Music	Maria	
1995	Irene	Irene	
1996	Scarlett	Scarlett	
1996	Anything Goes	Reno Sweeny	
1997	My Fair Lady	Eliza	
1997	Cleopatra	Cleopatra	
1998	The Sound of Music	Maria	
1998	Irene	Irene	
1998	Roman Holiday	Princess Anne	
1999	My Fair Lady	Eliza	
1999	Roman Holiday	Princess Anne	
1999	Carmen	Carmen	
2000	Roman Holiday	Princess Anne	
2000	Mitsuko	Mitsuko Aoyama	
2000	The Sound of Music	Maria	
2000	Once Upon a Mattress	Princess Winnifred	
2001	Carmen	Carmen	
2001	Gone with the Wind	Scarlett	
2002	Panama Hattie	Hattie	
2002	My Fair Lady	Eliza	
2002	The Lady of the Camellias	Marguerite	
2002	Gone with the Wind	Scarlett	
2003	Gone with the Wind	Scarlett	
2003	Twelfth Night	Viola, Sebastian	
2004	The Lady of the Camellias	Marguerite	
2004	The Sound of Music	Maria	
2004	My Fair Lady	Eliza	
2004	Marie Antoinette	Marie Antoinette	
2005	Tosca	Floria Tosca	
2005	My Fair Lady	Eliza	
2006	Twelfth Night	Viola, Sebastian	
2006	Marie Antoinette	Marie Antoinette	
2006	Gone with the Wind	Scarlett	
2007	My Fair Lady	Eliza	
2008	Moonstruck	Loretta Castorini	
2009	My Fair Lady	Eliza	
2009	Gabrielle Chanel	Coco Chanel	
2010	Hedda Gabler	Hedda Tesman	
2010	My Fair Lady	Eliza	
2011	Gabrielle Chanel	Coco Chanel	
2011	8 Women	Gaby	
2012	Ōedo Hidori 808		
2013	40 Carats	Ann Stanley	
2014	Too Many Husbands	Vicky Lowndes	
2016	Double Jeu	Françoise	

=== TV series ===
Year	Title	Role	Notes	Ref.
1986	Musashibō Benkei	Tomoe Gozen		
1988	Takeda Shingen	Satomi	Taiga drama	
2006	Kōmyō ga Tsuji	Oichi	Taiga drama	
2016	Daddy Sister	Takiko Aoyagi	Asadora	
2017	And Then There Were None	Ayako Hoshino		
2022–24	The Honest Realtor	Madame	2 seasons	

=== Internet series ===
Year	Title	Role	Notes	Ref.
2015	Atelier	Mayumi Minamijo		

=== Films ===
Year	Title	Role	Notes	Ref.
1991	Strawberry Road	Daughter of old man's brother		
1992	Angel Boku no Uta wa Kimi no Uta	Sawako Kamigakari		
2006	Sinking of Japan	Saori Takamori		
2008	Kurosagi	Sakura-mama		
2013	R100			
2016	The Kodai Family			
2022	Motherhood	Rumiko's mother		
2025	Godmother: Life of Ayako Koshino	Ayako Koshino	Lead role	
2026	The Honest Realtor: The Movie	Madame		
2026	Goodbye My Car	Reiko Kato		

=== Japanese dub ===
Year	Title	Role	Notes	Ref.
2006	The Chronicles of Narnia: The Lion, the Witch and the Wardrobe	The White Witch		
2017	Sing	Nana		
2022	Sing 2	Nana		
