= Kentarō Haneda =

Japanese pianist, composer and arranger

- 羽田 健太郎
- Born: January 12, 1949; Tokyo, Japan
- Died: June 2, 2007 (aged 58); Tokyo, Japan
- Other name: Haneken
- Education: Toho Gakuen School of Music
- Occupations: Pianist; composer; arranger
- Musical career
- Genres: Soundtrack; anison
- Instruments: Piano

Kentarō Haneda (羽田 健太郎, Haneda Kentarō; January 12, 1949 – June 2, 2007) was a Japanese pianist, composer and arranger. He composed for popular anime series, movies and video games. His popular name was Haneken.

== Biography ==
Haneda was born in Tokyo, Japan. After graduating from the Toho Gakuen School of Music, he taught as a professor at the Tokyo College of Music. He was best known as the composer of Wizardry—which was ported to NES and SNES console by Ascii at early 1990—, The Super Dimension Fortress Macross series, Barefoot Gen, Ys Symphony, Symphony Sorcerian and Genso Suikoden Ongaku-shu.

He died of liver cancer on June 2, 2007, at the age of 58.

== Selected works ==
=== Anime soundtracks ===
- The Adventure of Kohsuke Kindaichi (1977)
- Treasure Island (1978)
- Space Warrior Baldios (1980)
- The White Whale of Mu (1980)
- Kyoufu Densetsu Kaiki! Frankenstein (TV movie, 1981)
- Manga Mito Kōmon (1981)
- Natsu e no Tobira (1981)
- Thunderbirds 2086 (Scientific Rescue Team Technoboyger) (1982)
- Space Cobra (1982)
- The Super Dimension Fortress Macross (1982)
- Super Dimension Century Orguss (1983)
- Final Yamato (film, 1983)
- Barefoot Gen (film, 1983)
- Bagi, the Monster of Mighty Nature (TV movie, 1984)
- God Mazinger (1984)
- Macross: Do You Remember Love? (film, 1984)
- Sherlock Hound (1984)
- Odin: Photon Sailer Starlight (film, 1985)
- Onegai! Samia Don (1985)
- Barefoot Gen 2 (film, 1986)
- Galaxy Investigation 2100: Border Planet (TV movie, 1986)
- Prefectural Earth Defense Force (OVA, 1986, with Masahiru Komatsu)
- Metal Armor Dragonar (1987, with Toshiyuki Watanabe)
- Samurai Gold (OVA, 1987)
- Project A-ko 4: FINAL (OVA, 1989)
- Sunset on Third Street (1990)
- Dear Brother (1991)
- Genji (OVA, 1992)
- Mikeneko Holmes: The Lord of Ghost Castle (OVA, 1992)

=== Game soundtracks ===
- Wizardry series (Famicom and Super Famicom ports)
- Suikoden

=== Live-action TV ===
- Bakuryū Sentai Abaranger (2003)

=== Live-action movies ===
- Virus (1980)
- Matagi (1982)
- Bye-Bye Jupiter (1984)
- Mahjong hōrōki (1984)
- Baby Elephant Story: The Angel Who Descended to Earth (1986)
