= Flight from Ashiya =

1964 film by Michael Anderson

- Film poster by Frank McCarthy
- Directed by: Michael Anderson
- Written by: Elliott Arnold (novel); Waldo Salt
- Produced by: Harold Hecht
- Starring: Yul Brynner; Richard Widmark; George Chakiris; Suzy Parker; Shirley Knight; Danièle Gaubert; Eiko Taki; Joseph Di Reda; Mitsuhiro Sugiyama; E.S. Ince; Andrew Hughes
- Cinematography: Joseph MacDonald, ASC; Burnett Guffey, ASC
- Edited by: Gordon Pilkington
- Music by: Frank Cordell
- Production companies: Harold Hecht Films; Daiei Motion Picture Company
- Distributed by: United Artists
- Release date: March 25, 1964; (U.S. release)
- Running time: 100 minutes
- Countries: Japan; United States
- Language: English
- Budget: $2.3 million (Note: The New York Times claimed that the film budget was $1.8 million.)

Flight from Ashiya (aka Ashiya Kara no hiko) is a 1964 film about the U.S. Air Force's Air Rescue Service, flying from Ashiya Air Base, Japan. In this American-Japanese co-production film set in the early 1960s, a flight crew's mission is to rescue a liferaft of Japanese civilians stranded in rough seas. The film was based on the 1956 novel Rescue! by Elliott Arnold (repressed as Flight from Ashiya in 1959). It was released in Japan as Ashiya Kara no hiko.

== Plot ==
MSgt Mike Takashima, Col Glenn Stevenson and 1st Lt John Gregg, all members of the U. S. Air Force Air Rescue Service at Ashiya Air Base, Japan, set out to rescue the survivors of a Japanese ship wrecked in a still-raging storm. As they fly to the site of the wreck, each man recalls a part of his past: Gregg remembers the avalanche caused in Europe when his Sikorsky H-19 Chickasaw helicopter came too close to a mountain. The avalanche subsequently buried alive the group of people whom he was attempting to rescue.

The accident has since caused him to fear flying solo. Stevenson, deeply prejudiced against the Japanese, recalls the reason for his hatred: as a civilian pilot in the Philippines prior to World War II, he met and married Caroline Gordon. She and their infant son later died in a Japanese prison camp when they were refused medical supplies which were being saved for Japanese soldiers. Takashima, half-Polish (mother), half-Japanese (father), reminisces about his tragic love affair with Leila, an Algerian girl, when he was an Army paratrooper during World War II. He was unable to stop a bridge from being blown up, a bridge where Leila had run to look for him after learning that his unit was being withdrawn from town.

Stevenson, Gregg and Takashima are the crew of the lead aircraft of a flight of two Grumman HU-16 Albatross seaplanes dispatched to rescue the Japanese civilians at sea. When one HU-16 crashes in the rough seas, Stevenson refuses to jeopardize his aircraft for Japanese lives. At the last minute, however, he recalls Caroline's dying plea not to hate; he overcomes his prejudice.

Takashima volunteered to parachute to the life rafts with rescue equipment. Stevenson and Gregg then land the aircraft at sea and rescue the survivors, but when Stevenson is injured in the landing, Gregg is forced to overcome his fear and handle the dangerous takeoff and the flight back to Ashiya.

== Cast ==
- Yul Brynner as MSgt. Mike Takashima
- Richard Widmark as Lt. Col. Glenn Stevenson
- George Chakiris as 2nd Lt. John Gregg
- Suzy Parker as Lucille Caroll
- Shirley Knight as Caroline Gordon / Stevenson
- Danièle Gaubert as Leila
- Eiko Taki as Tomiko
- Joe Di Reda as SSgt. Randy Smith
- Tom Korzeniowski as Sgt. Garrison
- Mitsuhiro Sugiyama as Charlie
- E.S. Ince as Capt. Walter Mound
- Andrew Hughes as Dr. Horton
- William Ross as Capt. Jerry Cooper
- June Shelley (credited as June Elliott)

== Production ==
Principal photography on Flight from Ashiya began on August 27, 1962, with a 12-week shooting schedule. Most of the sequences took place in Japan with air base exteriors filmed at the Tachikawa Air Base, home to the USAF 39th Air Rescue Squadron. Two of the squadron's twin–radial engine Grumman HU-16 Albatross amphibious flying boats were supplied to the production. (Note: George Chakiris had signed a multi-picture deal with the Mirisch brothers. He later recalled: "I turned Flight of the Ashiya down three times, and for some reason I couldn’t explain why I did not want to make that movie. I didn’t think it was right for me, but I couldn’t explain why. So I finally went to the head of the William Morris Agency and he gave me three reasons why I should make this movie. He said “It’s important to keep making movies. Look at the billing you’re getting. Look at your money you’re getting.” He didn’t say 'Maybe this is a career move.' He wasn’t thinking that way either. He thought it was important to be seen and the money was good. But if you’re thinking of a career and properties you want to associate yourself with, none of that was happening and I didn’t know how to make it happen. I don’t say that with any real regret, but it was something I had to learn.")

== Reception ==
Film reviewer Howard Thompson in writing in The New York Times, was scathing in his review of Flight From Ashiya: "Occasionally, it's diverting to see just how consistently bad a picture can be. Anyone interested should catch 'Flight From Ashiya', which opened yesterday at the Palace and other Premiere Showcase theaters."

Aviation film historian Stephen Pendo, in Aviation in the Cinema (1985) had a similar reaction; Flight from Ashiya was "dull" and ruined by "too many flashbacks."

== See also ==
- List of American films of 1964
- "Flight From Ashiya" was also the name of the debut single by the British psychedelic band Kaleidoscope, released in September 1967.
- Daimajin
