= The Crazy Adventure =

1965 film by Kengo Furusawa

- Japanese theatrical release poster
- Directed by: Kengo Furusawa
- Written by: Yasuo Tanami; Ryōzō Kasahara
- Produced by: Sanezumi Fujimoto; Shin Watanabe
- Starring: Hajime Hana; Kei Tani; Hitoshi Ueki; Hiroshi Inuzuka; Etaro Ishibashi; Senri Sakurai; Shin Yasuda; Reiko Dan; Andrew Hughes
- Cinematography: Tadashi Iimura; Fukuzo Koizumi
- Edited by: Yoshitami Kuroiwa
- Music by: Kenjiro Hirose
- Production company: Toho
- Distributed by: Toho
- Release date: 31 October 1965 (Japan)
- Running time: 107 minutes
- Country: Japan
- Languages: Japanese; German
- Box office: ¥420,000,000 (equivalent to ¥1,766,641,053 in 2019)

The Crazy Adventure (Japanese: 大冒険, Hepburn: Daibōken; lit. 'Big Adventure or Great Adventure') is a 1965 Japanese comedy action film directed by Kengo Furusawa, with special effects by Eiji Tsuburaya. It is the fifth film in the Crazy Cats film series produced from 1963 to 1971 and was produced to commemorate the 10th anniversary of the formation of the Crazy Cats group.

The Crazy Adventure was released theatrically in Japan on October 31, 1965. It received a theatrical release in the United States on December 21, 1966 under the title Don't Call Me a Con Man and was re-released on June 1, 1993 under the title Don't Cal Me a Crime Man.

== Cast ==
- Hajime Hana as Hanai
- Hitoshi Ueki as Uematsu
- Kei Tani as Tanii
- Hiroshi Inuzuka as Inui
- Etaro Ishibashi as Ichibashi
- Senri Sakurai as Kakurai
- Shin Yasuda as Ishizaki
- Reiko Dan as Etsuko
- Andrew Hughes as Adolf Hitler
- Tetsu Nakamura as Nazi Asian Regional Commander
- Minoru Takada as Minister of Finance
- Bin Furuya as Weekly Top Reporter / Guest at Club Sahara / Man at Hotel Meriken
- Shoichi Hirose as Police officer
- Hisaya Ito as Japanese Fleet Officer

== Release ==
The Crazy Adventure was released in Japan on October 31, 1965 where it was distributed by Toho. and received a theatrical release in the United States on December 21, 1966 as Don't Call Me a Con Man and was re-released on June 1, 1993 as Don't Cal Me a Crime Man.
