= Judge and Jeopardy =

- Film poster
- Directed by: Shiro Moritani
- Screenplay by: Shinobu Hashimoto
- Based on: The Lawyer by Hiroshi Masaki
- Produced by: Tomoyuki Tanaka
- Starring: Keiju Kobayashi; Takamaru Sasaki; Ken Mizuta
- Cinematography: Asakazu Nakai
- Edited by: Hirokazu Iwashita
- Music by: Masaru Sato
- Production company: Toho
- Distributed by: Toho
- Release date: 8 June 1968 (Japan)
- Running time: 100 minutes
- Country: Japan

Judge and Jeopardy (Japanese: 首, Hepburn: Kubi; transl. Neck) is a 1968 Japanese drama film directed by Shiro Moritani. It is based on the story The Lawyer by attorney Hiroshi Masaki and his account of Japan's "Headless Murder Case" in which a police officer beat a suspect to death during the Pacific War.

== Release ==
Judge and Jeopardy was distributed theatrically in Japan by Toho on 8 June 1968. In Japan, the film won the awards for Best Film Score and Best Art Direction at the Mainichi Film Concours.
