= Virus (1980 film) =

1980 Japanese science fiction film

- Film poster
- Original title: 復活の日
- Directed by: Kinji Fukasaku
- Screenplay by: Koji Takada; Gregory Knapp; Kinji Fukasaku
- Based on: Virus by Sakyo Komatsu
- Produced by: Haruki Kadokawa
- Starring: Masao Kusakari; Sonny Chiba; George Kennedy; Robert Vaughn; Olivia Hussey; Glenn Ford; Chuck Connors; Henry Silva
- Cinematography: Daisaku Kimura
- Edited by: Akira Suzuki
- Music by: Kentarō Haneda
- Production company: Haruki Kadokawa Office
- Distributed by: Toho
- Release date: 28 June 1980 (Japan)
- Running time: 156 minutes
- Country: Japan
- Languages: English; French; German; Japanese
- Budget: US$13 million

Virus, known in Japan as Fukkatsu no Hi (Japanese: 復活の日; lit. "Day of Resurrection"), is a 1980 Japanese post-apocalyptic science fiction film directed by Kinji Fukasaku. Based on Sakyo Komatsu's 1964 novel of the same name, the film stars an international ensemble cast featuring Masao Kusakari, Sonny Chiba, George Kennedy, Robert Vaughn, Chuck Connors, Olivia Hussey, Edward James Olmos, Glenn Ford, and Henry Silva.

At the time of its release, the film was the most expensive Japanese film ever made.

== Plot ==
In 1982, a shady transaction is occurring between an East German scientist, Dr. Krause, and a group of Americans involving a substance known as MM88. MM88 is a deadly virus, created accidentally by an American geneticist, that amplifies the potency of any other virus or bacterium it comes into contact with. The Americans recover the virus sample, which was stolen from a lab in the US the year before, but the virus is accidentally released after the plane transporting it crashes, creating a pandemic initially known as the "Italian Flu".

Within seven months, virtually all the world's population has died off. However, the virus is inactive at temperatures below -10 degrees Celsius, and the polar winter has spared the 855 men and eight women stationed in Antarctica. The British nuclear submarine HMS Nereid joins the scientists after sinking a Soviet submarine whose infected crew attempts to make landfall near Palmer Station.

Several years later, as the group is beginning to repopulate their new home, it is discovered that an earthquake will activate the Automated Reaction System (ARS), a doomsday device, and launch the United States nuclear arsenal.

The Soviets have their own version of the ARS that will fire off their weapons in return, including one targeting Palmer Station. After all of the women and children and several hundred of the men are sent to safety aboard an icebreaker, Yoshizumi and Major Carter embark aboard the Nereid on a mission to shut down the ARS, protected from MM88 by an experimental vaccine.

The submarine arrives at Washington, D.C., and Yoshizumi and Carter make a rush for the ARS command bunker. However, they reach the room too late, and Carter dies in the rubble of the earthquake, deep in the bunker. Yoshizumi contacts the Nereid and tells them to try to save themselves, adding that the vaccine seems to have worked "If that still matters". "At this point in time, life still matters," the captain replies, telling Yoshizumi to stay where he is: He might be safe.

Washington is hit by a bomb, and the screen fills with atomic bomb after atomic bomb exploding. From there the movie's ending diverges based upon the two cuts. In the American version, the screen goes black for a moment, and the end credits roll over footage of the Antarctic and a poignant song sung by a lone woman's voice. The refrain is, "It’s not too late..." In the Japanese version, Yoshizumi survives the blast and walks back towards Antarctica. Upon reaching Tierra del Fuego in 1988, he finds survivors from the icebreaker, immunized by a since-developed vaccine. He reunites with the woman he fell in love with, they embrace, and Yoshizumi declares "Life is wonderful."

== Cast ==
- Masao Kusakari as Dr. Shûzô Yoshizumi
- Tsunehiko Watase as Yasuo Tatsuno
- Sonny Chiba as Dr. Yamauchi
- Kensaku Morita as Ryûji Sanazawa
- Toshiyuki Nagashima as Akimasa Matsuo
- Glenn Ford as President Richardson
- George Kennedy as Admiral Conway
- Robert Vaughn as Senator Barkley
- Chuck Connors as Captain McCloud
- Olivia Hussey as Marit
- Bo Svenson as Major Carter
- Henry Silva as General Garland
- Isao Natsuyagi as Commander Nakanishi
- Stephanie Faulkner as Sarah Baker
- Stuart Gillard as Dr. Edward Meyer
- Cec Linder as Dr. Latour
- George Touliatos as Colonel Rankin
- Chris Wiggins as Dr. Borodinov
- Edward James Olmos as Captain Lopez
- Colin Fox as Agent Z
- Ken Pogue as Dr. Krause
- Alberta Watson as Litha

== Background and production ==
In the 1970s, producer Haruki Kadokawa formed the Kadokawa Production Company. Its releases included Kon Ichikawa's The Inugamis and Junya Sato's Proof of the Man, with the latter having American cast members such as George Kennedy. Kadokawa began to develop films that were often based on literary properties held by Kadokawa's publishing arm.

The domestic box-office for these films was large, which led to Kadokawa putting US$13-16 million into the film Virus, making it the most expensive film in Japanese history on its release. The film was shot on location in Tokyo and various locations throughout Canada, including Kleinburg, Ottawa, and Halifax. The production was heavily supported by the Chilean Navy, who lent the submarine Simpson (SS-21) for use as a filming location. Submarine interiors were filmed on-board HMCS Okanagan (S74), an Oberon-class vessel that served in the Canadian Forces.

Kadokawa hired Kinji Fukasaku to direct the film as he was Japan's most commercially successful director at the time and had exposure in western markets such as directing the Japanese segments of Tora! Tora! Tora! as well as directing Uchū Kara no Messēji which was shown in the United States dubbed into English under the title Message from Space.

During filming, a Swedish cruiser used to transport crew was heavily damaged by a coral reef off the Chilean coast, and had to be rescued by the Navy.

== Soundtrack ==
Kentarō Haneda, Japanese composer and pianist, was the composer for Virus. The orchestral score was produced by Teo Macero, an American jazz producer.

Janis Ian wrote the lyrics to the song "Toujours Gai Mon Cher (You Are Love)" and performs it. In the closing credits, it is erroneously listed as "Tourjours Gai Mon Cher". The music was produced by Teo Macero.

== Release ==
Virus was released theatrically in Japan on 28 June 1980 where it was distributed by Toho.

Due to the box office failure of this movie, Kadokawa withdrew from producing major films. After that, they focused on movies starring idols such as Hiroko Yakushimaru, Tomoyo Harada and Noriko Watanabe, which achieved moderate success.

The American version of the film was shown for review at the Cannes Film Festival in May 1980 as a "work-in-progress" print. The non-English language footage was dubbed into English for this release and it ran at 156 minutes. It was initially released to home video in the United States with a 108-minute run-time and was presented on television with a 93-minute running time. The original Japanese-language cut was released to home video in 2006 with English subtitles.

The film was released internationally under different titles. In France it was released as Virus on 13 May 1981. In West Germany it was released as Overkill – Durch die Hölle zur Ewigkeit on 13 May 1982. In Norway it was released as Dødelig virus on 26 March 1982. In Denmark it was released as Livsfarlig virus on 4 May 1982.

As of 2006, the full 156-minute Japanese version of the film became available on DVD in the United States. BCI Eclipse released it in anamorphic widescreen as part of their Sonny Chiba Action Pack. The release retains the original Japanese title card and the Kadokawa logo. It is labeled on the box as the "Uncut International Version".

== Awards and nominations ==
Award	Year	Category	Recipient	Result
Award of the Japanese Academy	1981	Best Director	Kinji Fukasaku	Nominated
Award of the Japanese Academy	1981	Best Lighting	Hideki Mochizuki	Nominated
Award of the Japanese Academy	1981	Best Sound	Kenichi Benitani	Won
Award of the Japanese Academy	1981	Best Cinematography	Daisaku Kimura	Nominated
Award of the Japanese Academy	1981	Best Music Score	Kentarō Haneda	Nominated
Award of the Japanese Academy	1981	Best Art Direction	Yoshinaga Yoko'o	Nominated
Mainichi Film Concours	1981	Best Sound Recording	Kenichi Benitani	Won

== Critical reception ==
Jasper Sharp, writing for Midnight Eye, described Virus as capitalising upon "the conjecture that the one thing that unites the world is our mutual fear of imminent annihilation". Sharp recognised the film’s unexpected failure in the United States market, saying that it "fared disappointingly when it was released upon an American public that had by this stage already reached complete saturation point as far as the disaster epic was concerned". Sharp nonetheless acknowledged the aesthetic qualities of this film, describing it as "a highly watchable piece of early-80s excess."

Professor Sheri Chinen Biesen of Rowan University stated that Virus was a "rare Japanese disaster epic", inspired by films such as Chris Marker's La Jetée and Stanley Kubrick's Dr. Strangelove. She highlighted its relevance during the COVID-19 pandemic.

== See also ==
- Biological warfare in popular culture
- 12 Monkeys
- Contagion
- Outbreak
- Doomsday device
