= Kōshū Tani =

Japanese science fiction writer (born 1951)

- Born: March 30, 1951 (age 75); Itami, Hyōgo Prefecture, Japan
- Education: Osaka Institute of Technology
- Occupation: Writer
- Writing career
- Language: Japanese
- Genre: Hard science fiction
- Subject: Future history
- Notable awards: Seiun Award (three times); Nitta Jirō Culture Award

Kōshū Tani (谷 甲州, Tani Kōshū; born March 30, 1951 in Itami, Hyōgo Prefecture, Japan) is a Japanese science fiction writer. He graduated from the Osaka Institute of Technology, and worked as a volunteer in Nepal and the Philippines. He made his professional debut with the story 137th Mobile Brigade in 1979 while still in Nepal.

He is known mostly for his hard science fiction works, for which he won the Seiun Award three times (twice for Best Novel, and once for Best Short Story), and the Nitta Jirō Culture Award once.

He is a member of the Mystery Writers of Japan, the Science Fiction and Fantasy Writers of Japan, the Space Authors Club, and an associate member of the Hard SF Laboratory. Tani currently lives in Komatsu in Ishikawa Prefecture.

== History ==
Tani studied at the Osaka Institute of Technology, graduating from the engineering department with a degree in civil engineering. After graduating, he helped coordinate construction work by the Japan Overseas Cooperation Volunteers in Nepal, and also worked with the Japan International Cooperation Agency in the Philippines.

His debut work, 137th Mobile Brigade (137機動旅団, Hyakusanjūnana Kidō Ryodan), was published in the March 1979 issue of Kisō Tengai magazine, for which he won an honorable mention in the 2nd Kisō Tengai SF Rookie of the Year Awards in 1980. He published Planet CB-8 Wintering Party (惑星CB-8越冬隊, Wakusei CB-8 Ettōtai), beginning his close association with hard science fiction adventure novels. From that point, he also began to publish many stories of what he styled as "future history", including his novel Space Force History (航空宇宙軍史, Kōkū Uchūgun Shi).

In 1987, Tani's Martian Railroad 19 (火星鉄道一九, Māshan Reirurōdo Ikkyū) won the Seiun Award for "Best Japanese Short Story of the Year". He won the Seiun Award for "Best Japanese Novel of the Year" in 1994 for Endless Search for the Enemy (終わりなき索敵, Owarinaki Sakuteki).

His story White-peaked Man (白き嶺の男, Shirokimine no Otoko) was awarded the Nitta Jirō Culture Award in 1996. He won "Best Japanese Novel of the Year" again in 2007 for Japan Sinks: Part II (日本沈没・第二部, Nihon Chinbotsu Dai-ni-bu), which he coauthored with Sakyo Komatsu.

== Works in English translation ==
- "Q-Cruiser Basilisk" (Speculative Japan 2, Kurodahan Press, 2011)
- The Erinys Incident (Kurodahan Press, 2018)
