= Yasumichi Morita =

Japanese interior designer

- 森田 恭通
- Born: 19 December 1967 (age 57); Ibaraki, Osaka
- Occupation: Interior designer

Yasumichi Morita (森田 恭通, Morota Yasumichi, born 19 December 1967) is an interior designer from Ibaraki, Osaka. He undertakes projects in many countries including Japan, New York and Hong Kong.

== Biography ==
=== Early life and education ===
Morita was born as the eldest son of four brothers. Due to his father's occupation he was moving frequently when he was young. During his teenage years, he became involved in interior work through taking a part-time jobs in window display.

In 1989, while studying at Yashiro Gakuin University (now Kobe International University), he worked on the interior of the bar "Cool" in Kobe Sannomiya, which was featured in a specialised magazine. This was his debut work.

=== Career ===
After graduating from university, he took a job at Imagine Co., Ltd., a design company in Osaka, where he served as chief designer.

Morita established his own company, the Yasumichi Morita Design Office, in 1996. The company was restarted as Glamorous Co., Ltd. in June 2000. He later established the Y. Morita Design (HK) Ltd. in Hong Kong in 2001.

=== Personal life ===
On 14 March 2007, he announced his engagement with actress Mao Daichi. They were married on 25 July 2007 in the Champagne region of France.

== Major works ==
- Murata Mitsui (Kita-ku, Osaka, 1999)
- Arashiyama Station (Ukyō-ku, Kyoto, 2002)
- Resona Bank Tokyo Midtown Branch Office (Minato, Tokyo, 2007)
- Aoyama Francfranc (Minato, Tokyo, 2010)
- River Side Tower Nakanosima (Osaka, Osaka Prefecture, 2010)
- Isetan Shinjuku Main Store (Shinjuku, Tokyo, 2013)

== Television appearances ==
- Another Sky (12 Nov 2010, NTV)
- Contact Cafe (15 Dec 2010, NBN)
