= James Howard Bridge =

British-American journalist

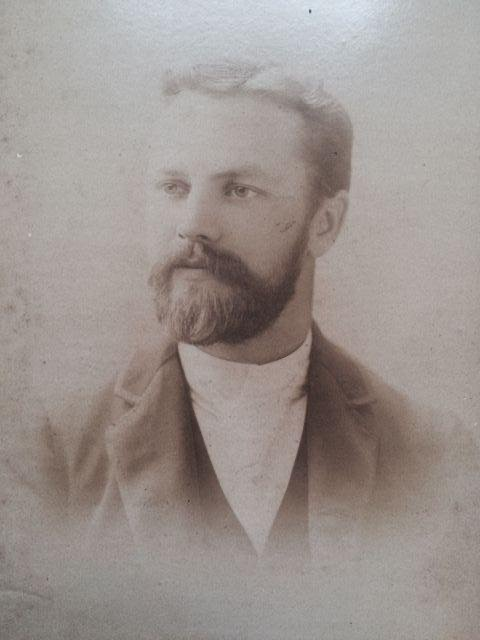
- Bridge, c. 1897-1899
- Born: May 8, 1856; Manchester, Lancashire, England
- Died: May 28, 1939 (aged 83); New York City, U.S.
- Occupation: Journalist

James Howard Bridge (May 8, 1856 – May 28, 1939) was an English-American journalist. Throughout his career, Bridge was employed by Herbert Spencer, Andrew Carnegie, and Henry Clay Frick in various capacities. Bridge also penned several books, with his best-known work being The History of the Carnegie Steel Company.

== Biography ==
Bridge was born in 1856 in Manchester, Lancashire, England. His parents worked in manufacturing plants. Bridge was educated at the Grand Lycée in Marseille (a branch of the now-defunct Université de France), and the University of Bonn.

After working as a court reporter and newspaper apprentice across England, Bridge was appointed Herbert Spencer's personal secretary in London in 1879.

Five years later, in 1884, Bridge left London for New York City. He did not have any prior connections in the U.S. However, through a recommendation letter from Spencer and the help of Edward L. Youmans, Bridge found work as literary assistant to Andrew Carnegie, a position he maintained for five years. Bridge’s duties included contributing research and writing for Carnegie's 1886 Triumphant Democracy.

Bridge served as owner and editor-in-chief of California-based literary magazine the Overland Monthly from 1897-1900. At the Overland, he published several of Jack London's first short stories.

Once back in New York, Bridge wrote the 1903 book The History of the Carnegie Steel Company, a highly critical profile of Carnegie, the American steel industry, and more broadly, capitalism.

In 1914, Bridge was hired as private secretary to Henry Clay Frick. Bridge also called himself curator of the (then private) Frick Collection. Helen Clay Frick, heiress of the Frick fortune, later disputed this description. Bridge maintained this role until 1928, when he resigned. Bridge sued Helen Clay Frick in 1935 for libel and slander, accusing Frick of damaging his professional reputation with her claim he had never been curator of the Frick Collection, but he ultimately lost the suit.

Bridge was a longtime member of the Authors Club of New York, with stints as president and vice-president. Along with Rossiter Johnson and Clinton Scollard, Bridge co-edited the second book of the club's Liber Scriptorum, published 1921.

In 1939, Bridge died at the age of 83 in New York City after an illness of five weeks. Bridge was survived by his wife Clara Blake Shivers Bridge and his two daughters, Cornelia Bridge (Barnard) and Margery Bridge (Champlin).

== Works ==
• A Fortnight in Heaven: An Unconventional Romance, 1886 (published under pseudonym Harold Brydges)

• Uncle Sam at Home, 1888 (published under pseudonym Harold Brydges)

• The Trust—Its book; Being a Presentation of the Several Aspects of the Latest Forms of Industrial Evolution, 1902 (co-author; editor)

• The History of the Carnegie Steel Company: An Inside Review of Its Humble Origin and Impressive Growth, 1903

• Portraits and Personalities: Imaginary Conversations in the Frick Galleries, 1929

• Millionaires and Grub Street: Comrades and Contacts in the Last Half Century, 1931
