= Virus (novel) =

1964 novel by Sakyo Komatsu

- Cover for the Haikasoru translation
- Author: Sakyo Komatsu
- Original title: Fukkatsu no Hi
- Translator: Daniel Huddleston
- Cover artist: Fawn Lau
- Language: Japanese
- Subject: Apocalypse, Biological warfare
- Genre: Sci-fi
- Publisher: Hayakawa Publishing
- Publication place: Japan
- English publication date: November 20, 2012: US: Viz Media/Haikasoru
- Media type: Hardbound
- Pages: 312
- ISBN: 978-1-4215-4932-3

Virus (復活の日, Fukkatsu no hi), literally The Day of Resurrection is a 1964 post-apocalyptic science fiction novel written by Sakyo Komatsu. The novel was adapted into a movie of the same name in 1980.

An English translation by Daniel Huddleston was released in November 2012 by Viz Media's Haikasoru imprint.

== Plot summary ==
A US space mission in 1964 gathers a group of microbes in Earth orbit and are later recovered by American biowarfare researchers. Two microbes are found to be coccus-shaped supergerms capable of surviving in absolute zero and have the potential to grow exponentially in terrestrial conditions. One of the researchers, Dr Meyer, discovers the germ's regenerative ability and tries to stop work on the project. However, a sample of the germs is stolen and sent to Britain's Germ Warfare Research Laboratory at Porton Down for further development.

On February 19 (actually implied as 1970, later to be known as the Year of the Calamity), a scientist at Porton Down smuggles a sample of the developed bioweapon, codenamed MM88, and gives it to a group of men who have been tasked to bring it to Dr. Leisener, a Czech molecular biologist who is skilled at developing antidotes for it. The scientist, Dr. Karlsky, insists that the germ must never be exposed to warm temperatures. However, the men double-cross him and an assistant later kills him under the guise of a suicide. The group flies out of England bound for a rendezvous with US intelligence agents in Turkey. They never make it; their plane crashes into the Alps in the middle of a snowstorm and the vial holding the germ breaks open. The crash site is investigated but investigators could not link it with the theft of the sample.

MM88, which is designed to piggyback with other existing illnesses and make them more lethal, begins to reproduce with the advent of spring in the Alps. Although some local communities have been reporting small animals suddenly dropping dead in their area, an Italian matinee idol's death in an auto crash in early March sparks media attention. His girlfriend dies shortly after a press conference eight days later, but not before she reveals that the actor died of a heart attack just before the accident despite being in good health. Several European countries are also reporting sudden deaths of livestock animals.

Over the 2nd quarter, outbreaks of influenza and polio take place around the world, and news of random heart attacks dominate the papers. Another disease also kills off chickens and their eggs just when scientists needed to acquire large stocks of eggs for developing vaccines. An outbreak of an illness named 'Tibetan flu' begins to inflict massive casualties, with a number of countries reporting hundreds of thousands killed from random heart attacks. The Soviet Union's premier and vice-premier die of the illness, and Meyer is forcibly committed to the Sloan-Kettering Institute to prevent revealing the truth about MM88's origins. Things are also worse in the scientific community; the fact that no one except the now-dead Porton Down researchers know of the existence of the space microbes (which have been suppressed for secrecy reasons) cripples efforts to develop a vaccine. Nearly all of humankind is killed by MM88 by August.

As the pandemic spreads worldwide, meanwhile, the staff of several international research stations in Antarctica begin to pool their resources towards creating a new society in the ice under the so-called "Supreme Council of Antarctica (SCA)." A scientist at Sloan-Kettering gets in touch with Dr. Meyer and is able to piece together all information about MM88 for broadcast to the Antarctic bases before he dies. A US Polaris ballistic missile submarine, the USS Nereid, and a Soviet sub, the T-232, make contact with the SCA and are welcomed into an improvised submarine base in Hope Bay.

Over the next four years, the community in Antarctica - an estimated 10,000 strong - gradually breaks down national affiliations and learns to live together while tapping the continent's natural resources. The large community only has 16 women - all of childbearing age, and the SCA moves to have them undergo consensual sex for procreation purposes. At the same time, the two submarines are sent on research duty around the world, giving Japanese seismologist Yoshizumi time to perfect a special method for predicting earthquakes.

In late 1974, one of Yoshizumi's reports attract the SCA leadership's attention. He briefs them about a powerful earthquake somewhere in Alaska that is slated to take place in around spring 1975. Admiral Conway and Major Carter of the US reveals that the earthquake has the potential to destroy a Distant Early Warning Line station in the state and in the process trip the Automatic Reaction System (ARS), a command computer for the US strategic arsenal. Joint Chiefs of Staff chairman General Garland activated the system before his death in the closing stages of the pandemic. The two American officers admit that the ARS was borne out of hardline anti-Soviet policies; a new regime that took office in 1969 was working towards a nuclear disarmament deal with the Soviets around the time of the pandemic. The Soviet contingent admits that some of their missiles may be targeted at a now-decommissioned US rocket base in Antarctica.

In a special mission codenamed Operation Fireman, Yoshizumi and Major Carter volunteer to go to the ARS command bunker underneath the White House; two Soviet volunteers go to Moscow aboard the T-232 to shut down their own version of the ARS. Yoshizumi and Major Carter - who have been inoculated by French scientist Dr Henri Louis De la Tour with an experimental vaccine derived from samples of MM88 irradiated with neutron energy - arrive in Washington at roughly the same time as the Alaska earthquake. They scramble to reach the bunker, just as the ARS begins preparing to launch its missiles. Already reeling from the pain of a snake bite and seeing a young skeleton resembling his dead daughter, Carter commits suicide and Yoshizumi stays in the bunker, alerting the Nereid to head for open water immediately as he sits out the nuclear exchange. The Soviet team's fate is left unknown, although it is later revealed by de la Tour that no Soviet missiles hit Antarctica and most of the warheads were actually neutron weapons; their radioactive rays mutate MM88 into a form that does not affect humans. It is implied that the Nereid survived the nuclear strike.

Two advance parties of survivors arrive in southern Argentina over the winter of 1978 and 1979. A third and much bigger group of survivors follow in December 1979. This group is stunned to see Yoshizumi emerge from hiding nearby; he had spent the past several years trekking all the way from Washington, proving that de la Tour's vaccine worked. In August 1980, ten full years after the pandemic, the colony in Argentina prepares to send an exploration team into the interior of the country.

== Characters ==
=== Japanese ===
- Yoshizumi - A seismologist assigned to Showa Station in 1970, Yoshizumi is the novel's leading protagonist. He stays in the Antarctic all throughout the pandemic. In the novel's prologue set in March 1973, Yoshizumi actually considered emerging from the surface of Tokyo Bay to die but is pulled away at the last minute. After the nuclear exchange, he travels south, working his way down the US East Coast to Texas and crossed the Panama Canal by 1977. He eventually recovers from exhaustion after the survivors find him.
- Tatsuno - One of Yoshizumi's colleagues at Showa Station, Tatsuno gradually cracks under the strain of tuning into the base's ham radio to receive any broadcasts from around the world. He is mentally unstable after a failed attempt in August to talk to a young boy in Arizona - the boy does not receive his signals and commits suicide.
- Noriko - Yoshizumi's girlfriend, Noriko is a newspaper reporter who is strained from covering the pandemic. She dies of the disease in late July at her condo thinking of Yoshizumi.

=== American ===
- President Silverland - A rabid anti-communist and the penultimate president of the US from 1965 to 1969, Silverland built up his administration with a singular desire to destroy the USSR, in an apparent reversal of the Kennedy administration's hopes for peace. This paranoia later contributed to Silverland being voted out of office in the 1968 elections. His unnamed successor then took a more peaceful stance, even planning to sign a global nuclear disarmament treaty with the USSR and other nuclear states if not for the pandemic.
- General Garland - The chairman of the Joint Chiefs at the time of the pandemic, Garland was a lieutenant-general when Silverland worked with him to develop the ARS in 1966. Although the regime that took office in 1969 reversed Silverland's anti-Soviet policies, the ARS remained active. In the middle of July, Garland forcibly took the access keys from the president and vice president as they died. He dies soon after at the ARS command bunker - but not before activating the system.
- Admiral Conway - the commander of the US Antarctic contingent, Conway was originally part of the US operation to establish a space rocket base in Antarctica - which is an IRBM base targeting Soviet allies in Africa and South America. Once the SCA is established, he emerges as its de facto leader and manages the entire community with help from several officials from the former nations.
- Major Carter - A US Army major, Carter was revealed to have been part of the ARS development team and was assigned to the US Antarctic group to keep tabs on Admiral Conway. He volunteers to go with Yoshizumi to Washington to shut down the ARS but later commits suicide.
- Captain McCloud—The SCA contacted the Nereid's skipper and asked him to send his sub to the Antarctic. The Nereid is actually one of two US subs contacted to head to the Antarctic. McCloud is ordered to sink the 2nd sub after its skipper reports infection among the crew.

=== Soviet ===
- Dr Borodinov - The head of the Soviet Antarctic Wintering Team, Borodinov is the SCA council's vice-chairman.
- Capt Nevsky - A representative of the Soviet Defense Ministry, Nevsky reveals the existence of a Soviet counterpart to the ARS housed in the Kremlin. Like Major Carter, he volunteers to turn it off, but his fate is left unknown.
- Irma - A middle-aged woman, she is one of the 16 women who are tapped as surrogate mothers to continue the human race. She eventually falls for Yoshizumi before he leaves for Operation Fireman.

== Film adaptation ==
A movie adaptation of the novel was released by Kadokawa Films in 1980 with Masao Kusakari as Yoshizumi. The movie was shot in several locations including Antarctica and Machu Picchu in Peru. Much of the novel's material was adjusted for the film. Some of the changes include:

- Changing the setting for the bioweapons lab from Porton Down to a secret base in East Germany.
- The actual exposition of the air crash in the mountains.
- Noriko being rewritten as a nurse instead of a newspaper reporter.
- The size of the Antarctic community being reduced from 10,000 to 863.
- The Nereid is ordered to sink the T-232.
- The name of the disease was changed from "Tibetan flu" to "Italian flu", following the initial spreading of MM88 in Northern Italy.

== English translation ==
Viz Media imprint Haikasoru released an English version of the novel in November 2012. Translated by Daniel Huddleston, the novel is 312 pages long. The Sakyo Komatsu Office and the IO Corporation awarded the translation rights with help from the Japan Foreign Rights Center.

== Critical reception ==
The novel has reaped mixed reviews.

Pat Padua of blogcritics.org said the book was a "terribly hard slog of a cautionary tale," noting the execution of the backstory behind the disease.

== See also ==
- Biological warfare in popular culture

== Informational links ==
- Official page at Haikasoru
