= Sayonara Jupiter =

1982 novel by Sakyo Komatsu

- Author: Sakyo Komatsu
- Language: Japanese
- Genre: Science fiction novel
- Publication date: 1982
- Publication place: Japan

Sayonara Jupiter (さよならジュピター, Sayonara Jupitā) is a novel by Sakyo Komatsu, released as two volumes. It is a novelization of an early draft of the 1984 film of the same Japanese name, directed by Komatsu and Koji Hashimoto.

The novel won the 1983 Seiun Award.

== Synopsis ==
The novel is set in the future where humanity has grown to the point where Earth can no longer support all of them. As a result, humanity has begun to spread throughout space and there is now an attempt to turn the planet Jupiter into a second sun in order to make some of the other planets inhabitable.

== Awards and nominations ==
- Seiun Award (1983, won)

== Film adaptation ==
In 1984 a film adaptation of Sayonara Jupiter was released to theaters in Japan. The film, which is also known in English as Bye Bye Jupiter, has received mixed reviews from English language critics. Akihiko Hirata made his final film appearance in the film.
