= Japan Sinks: People of Hope =

Japanese drama television series

Japanese name
- Kanji: 日本沈没ー希望のひとー
Transcriptions
- Revised Hepburn: Nihon Chinbotsu -Kibo no Hito-
- Genre: Drama
- Based on: Japan Sinks by Sakyo Komatsu
- Written by: Hiroshi Hashimoto
- Directed by: Shun'ichi Hirano; Nobuhiro Doi; Yōhei Miyazaki
- Starring: Shun Oguri; Kenichi Matsuyama; Anne Watanabe; Toru Nakamura; Teruyuki Kagawa
- Narrated by: Chiaki Horan
- Composer: Yugo Kanno
- Country of origin: Japan
- Original language: Japanese
- No. of episodes: 10

Production
- Producer: Keigo Higashinaka
- Running time: 47–68 minutes
- Production company: TBS

Original release
- Network: JNN (TBS) (Japan); Netflix (International)
- Release: October 10 – December 12, 2021

Japan Sinks: People of Hope (Japanese: 日本沈没ー希望のひとー, Hepburn: Nihon Chinbotsu: Kibo no Hito) is a Japanese drama series premiered in October 2021. Based on the novel Japan Sinks by Sakyo Komatsu, the series aired on TBS and its affiliates, and also aired internationally on Netflix as a part of a three-series deal between Netflix and TBS.

== Cast ==
- Shun Oguri as Keishi Amami
- Kenichi Matsuyama as Koichi Tokiwa
- Anne Watanabe as Minori Shiina
- Toru Nakamura as Prime Minister Eiichi Higashiyama
- Teruyuki Kagawa as Yusuke Tadokoro
- Eiji Wentz as Taira Ishizuka
- Anne Nakamura as Misuzu Aihara
- Yūki Yoda (Nogizaka46) as Ai Yamada
- Jun Kunimura as Tōru Sera
- Takashi Kobayashi as Isao Fujioka
- Jun Fubuki as Yoshie Amami
- Manami Higa as Kaori Amami
- Yoshiko Miyazaki as Kazuko Shiina
- Kōtarō Yoshida (special appearance) as Mamoru Amami
- Tetta Sugimoto as Shūya Naganuma
- Morio Kazama as Makoto Ikushima
- Renji Ishibashi as Gen Satoshiro
