= Japan Sinks =

1973 novel written by Sakyo Komatsu

- First English edition (Harper & Row)
- Author: Sakyo Komatsu
- Original title: 日本沈没
- Translator: Michael Gallagher
- Language: Japanese
- Genre: Science fiction thriller
- Publisher: Kobunsha
- Publication date: 1973
- Publication place: Japan
- English publication date: 1976
- Media type: Print (Hardback & Paperback)
- Pages: 224 pp
- ISBN: 978-4-7700-2039-0
- OCLC: 33045249

Japan Sinks (Japanese: 日本沈没, Hepburn: Nippon Chinbotsu) is a disaster novel by Japanese writer Sakyo Komatsu, published in 1973.

== Overview ==
Komatsu took nine years to complete the work. It was published in two volumes, both released at the same time. The novel received the 27th Mystery Writers of Japan Award and the Seiun Award for a Japanese novel-length work. The English translation was first published in 1975. In 1995, after the Osaka-Kobe earthquake, a second English edition (ISBN 4-7700-2039-2) was published. The English translation is abridged. In 2006, a sequel to the novel, co-authored with Kōshū Tani, was published.

The novel has numerous adaptations: a film based on the novel made in the same year directed by Shirō Moritani, a manga adaptation written by Takao Saito and published in Weekly Shōnen Champion in 1973–74, a television drama by TBS and Toho broadcast in 1974–75, a film remake in 2006 by Shinji Higuchi, an original net anime series, Japan Sinks: 2020, released on Netflix by Science Saru in 2020, and a reboot drama, Japan Sinks: People of Hope, broadcast in 2021 on TBS.

=== Geophysical background ===
Japan is on a destructive plate boundary, where the Philippine Sea Plate subducts the Eurasian Plate. It is a triple junction and three subduction zones are involved. After the 2011 Tōhoku earthquake and tsunami, towns like Ishinomaki subsided.

=== Political background ===
This novel is now seen as an important look into the cultural context of 1970s Japan, particularly due to its level of popularity.

== Parodies ==
A parody short story by Yasutaka Tsutsui, "Nihon Igai Zenbu Chinbotsu" (日本以外全部沈没; lit. 'Everything Other than Japan Sinks') was also released in 1973, and adapted into a film of the same name in 2006.

A parody visual novel by Takami Akai, Nihon Chinbotsu Desu Yo (日本沈没ですよ; lit. 'Hey, Japan is Sinking'), was announced in 2024.
