= Koji Hashimoto (director) =

Japanese film director

- 橋本 幸治
- Born: January 21, 1936
- Died: January 9, 2005 (aged 68)
- Occupation: Film director
- Years active: 1962-1984

Koji Hashimoto (橋本 幸治, Hashimoto Kōji; January 21, 1936 – January 9, 2005) was a Japanese film director and producer. He directed the 1984 films Sayonara Jupiter and The Return of Godzilla. He died of coronary disease at age 69 while mountain climbing.

== Filmography ==
=== Director ===
- Sayonara Jupiter (1984)
- The Return of Godzilla (1984)

=== Assistant director ===
- King Kong vs. Godzilla (1962)
- Ghidorah, the Three-Headed Monster (1964)
- Frankenstein vs. Baragon (1965)
- Invasion of Astro-Monster (1965)
- Latitude Zero (1969)
- All Monsters Attack (1969)
- Dodes'ka-den (1970)
- Submersion of Japan (1973)
- Prophecies of Nostradamus (1974)
- The Gate of Youth (1975)
- The Imperial Navy (1981)
