= Japan Sinks: 2020 =

Japanese original net animation

- Promotional poster

日本沈没 2020 (Nihon Chinbotsu Ni-Zero-Ni-Zero)
- Genre: Science fiction, drama
- Created by: Sakyo Komatsu
- Original net animation
- Directed by: Masaaki Yuasa (chief); Ho Pyeon-gang (series)
- Written by: Toshio Yoshitaka
- Music by: Kensuke Ushio
- Studio: Science Saru
- Licensed by: Netflix
- Released: July 9, 2020
- Runtime: 25–32 minutes
- Episodes: 10
- Anime film

Japan Sinks: 2020 Theatrical Edition
- Directed by: Masaaki Yuasa
- Written by: Toshio Yoshitaka
- Music by: Kensuke Ushio
- Studio: Science Saru
- Released: November 13, 2020
- Runtime: 151 minutes

Japan Sinks: 2020 (Japanese: 日本沈没 2020, Hepburn: Nippon Chinbotsu Ni-Zero-Ni-Zero), is an original net animation (ONA) series adaptation of the 1973 novel Japan Sinks by Sakyo Komatsu. The series, announced on October 9, 2019, was animated by Science Saru, with Ho Pyeon-gang and Masaaki Yuasa served as directors. Toshio Yoshitaka handled series composition, Naoya Wada designed the characters, and Kensuke Ushio composed the series' music. Yuko Sasaki, Reina Ueda and Tomo Muranaka are credited with starring roles. It was released worldwide by Netflix on July 9, 2020. A film compilation version of the series was subsequently released in Japanese theaters on November 13, 2020.

== Summary ==
Shortly after the 2020 Tokyo Olympics, a major earthquake hits Japan. Amidst the chaos, the Mutou siblings Ayumu (a 14-year-old track and field athlete) and her younger brother Gou (a 7-year-old video game enthusiast) attempt to escape the city with their family and friends. However, the sinking Japanese archipelago complicates their escape. Plunged into extreme conditions, the Mutou siblings believe in the future and acquire the strength to survive with utmost effort.

== Voice cast ==
Character	Japanese voice actor	English dub actor
Ayumu Mutō (武藤 歩)	Reina Ueda	Faye Mata
Gō Mutō (武藤 剛)	Tomo Muranaka	Ryan Bartley
Kaito / Kite	Kensho Ono	Aleks Le
Haruo Koga (古賀 春生)	Hiroyuki Yoshino	Billy Kametz
Mari Mutō (武藤 マリ)	Yuko Sasaki	Grace Lynn Kung
Kōichirō Mutō (武藤 航一郎)	Masaki Terasoma	Keith Silverstein
Osamu Asada (浅田 修)	Daiki Hamano	Jamieson Price
Nanami Miura (三浦 七海)	Nanako Mori	Abby Trott
Kanae Murota (室田 叶恵)	Tomoko Shiota	Cathy Cavadini
Kunio Hikita (疋田 国夫)	Umeji Sasaki	Doug Stone
Saburō Ōtani (大谷 三郎)	Taichi Takeda	Kim Strauss
Daniel	Gensho Tasaka	George Cockle

== Episodes ==
No.	Title	Original release date
1	"The Beginning of the End"; Transliteration: "Owari no hajimari" (Japanese: オワリノハジマリ （終わりの始まり）)	July 9, 2020
2	"Farewell, Tokyo"; Transliteration: "Saraba, Tōkyō" (Japanese: さらば、東京)	July 9, 2020
3	"A New Hope"; Transliteration: "Aratana Kibō" (Japanese: 新たな希望)	July 9, 2020
4	"An Open Door"; Transliteration: "Aita Doa" (Japanese: 開いたドア)	July 9, 2020
5	"Illusion"; Transliteration: "Iryūjon" (Japanese: イリュージョン)	July 9, 2020
6	"An Oracle"; Transliteration: "Orakuru" (Japanese: オラクル)	July 9, 2020
7	"The Dawn"; Transliteration: "Yoake" (Japanese: 夜明け)	July 9, 2020
8	"Mom's Secret"; Transliteration: "Mama no Himitsu" (Japanese: ママの秘密)	July 9, 2020
9	"Japan Sinks"; Transliteration: "Japanshinku" (Japanese: ジャパンシンク)	July 9, 2020
10	"Resurrection"; Transliteration: "Fukkatsu" (Japanese: 復活)	July 9, 2020

== Reception ==
On review aggregator Rotten Tomatoes, the series holds a 72% approval rating based on 18 reviews, with an average rating of 6.54/10. The website's critics consensus reads, "Japan Sinks: 2020's swell of tension and frenetic pace leave little room to breathe, but bursts of hope and interesting insights into humanity may help brave viewers weather its apocalyptic story." The series attracted criticism within Japan for its condemnation of Japanese nationalism, but also received positive attention in the West for its multiculturalism and inclusiveness, and was named as one of the best anime series of 2020.

The first episode of Japan Sinks: 2020 was awarded the 2021 Annecy Jury Prize for a Television Series, and the series as a whole received two nominations at the 2021 Crunchyroll Anime Awards. The compilation film version of the series was awarded a Jury Selection Prize at the 2021 Japan Media Arts Festival.
