= Shirō Moritani =

Japanese film director

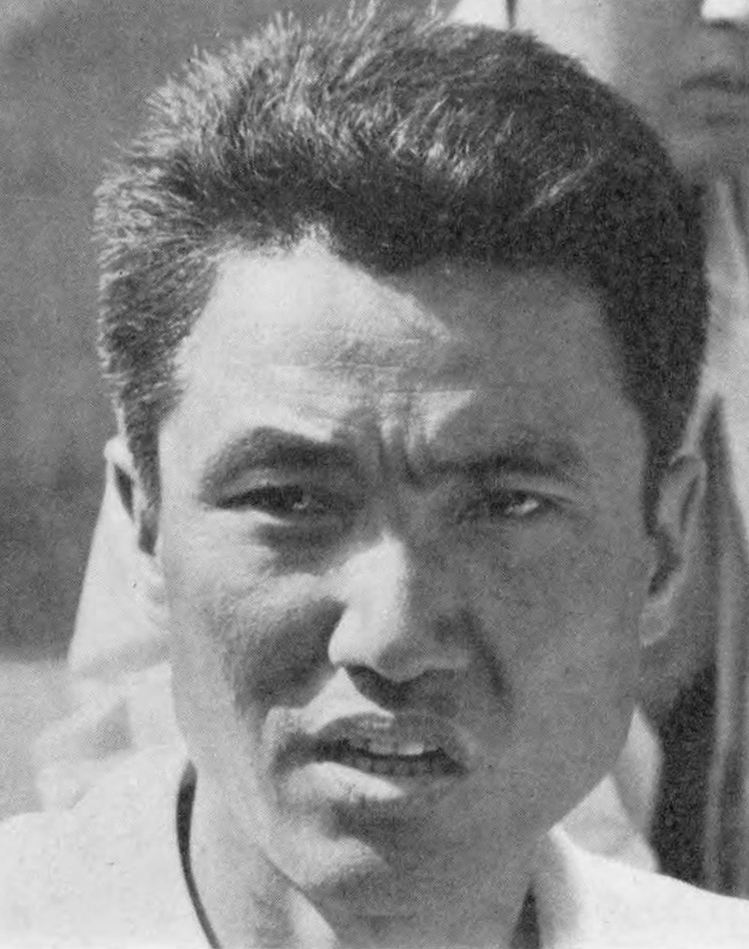
Shirō Moritani in 1967

Shirō Moritani (森谷 司郎, Moritani Shirō; September 28, 1931 – December 2, 1984) was a film director and screenwriter from Japan. Born in Tokyo, he debuted as an assistant director in Akira Kurosawa's 1961 film Yojimbo. His film Mount Hakkoda won the Mainichi Film Award for Excellence Film in 1978.

== Filmography ==
=== As director ===
- 1966 : Zero Fighters: Great Air Battle
- 1967 : Zoku izuko e; based on the 1939 novel Izuko e by Yōjirō Ishizaka
- 1967 : Sodachi zakari
- 1968 : Judge and Jeopardy
- 1968 : Aniki no koibito
- 1969 : Futari no koibito
- 1969 : Dankon (The Bullet Wounded; Bullet Wound)
- 1970 : Akazukinchan kiotsukete (Take Care, Red Riding Hood); based on the novel by Kaoru Shōji
- 1971 : Saredowareraga hibi yori wakare no shi
- 1971 : Shiosai; film version of the Yukio Mishima novel The Sound of Waves
- 1972 : Hajimete no tabi
- 1973 : Submersion of Japan
- 1977 : Mount Hakkoda
- 1978 : Seishoku no ishibumi
- 1980 : Dōran (The Revolt)
- 1981 : Hyōryū; based on the novel by Akira Yoshimura
- 1982 : Kaikyō
- 1983 : Shōsetsu Yoshida gakkō; based on the non-fiction political novel by Isamu Togawa

== Bibliography ==
- 田中文雄 (1993). 神を放った男 映画製作者田中友幸とその時代. キネマ旬報社. ISBN 4-87376-070-4.
- 日本映画人名事典・監督篇. キネマ旬報社. 1997. ISBN 4873762081.
