= Submersion of Japan =

- Theatrical release poster
- Directed by: Shirō Moritani
- Screenplay by: Shinobu Hashimoto
- Based on: Japan Sinks by Sakyo Komatsu
- Produced by: Tomoyuki Tanaka; Osamu Tanaka
- Starring: Keiju Kobayashi; Tetsuro Tamba; Ayumi Ishida; Hiroshi Fujioka; Yusuke Takita
- Cinematography: Hiroshi Murai; Daisaku Kimura
- Edited by: Michiko Ikeda
- Music by: Masaru Sato
- Production company: Toho-Eizo
- Distributed by: Toho
- Release date: 29 December 1973 (Japan)
- Running time: 143 minutes
- Country: Japan
- Language: Japanese
- Budget: $3 million
- Box office: $17.5 million

Submersion of Japan (Japanese: 日本沈没, Hepburn: Nihon Chinbotsu; lit. 'Japan Sinks') is a Japanese disaster film directed by Shirō Moritani in 1973. It is based on the 1973 novel Japan Sinks by Sakyo Komatsu. The film stars Keiju Kobayashi, Hiroshi Fujioka and Ayumi Ishida.

== Plot ==
Geophysicist Dr. Tadokoro and Onodera Toshio take the submarine Wadatsumi-1 to the Ogasawara Islands, in order to investigate tremors in the seafloor. They discover that the land mass of the Japanese islands is collapsing into the Japan Trench.

Afterward, Onodera is introduced to Abe Reiko, and the two become lovers. Relaxing on the beach, they witness an eruption of Mount Amagi. A meeting of government officials, including Prime Minister Yamamoto, focuses on assessing the disaster. Tadokoro warns that more eruptions and earthquakes are imminent, but his claims are rejected as alarmist. He later meets with a mysterious wealthy man named Mr. Watari, who agrees to fund the doctor's research expeditions. With this funding, he develops a course of action to address a nationwide earthquake disaster. During a meeting to secure a research submarine from France, Mount Kirishima erupts.

Onodera leaves his job as a submarine pilot to help Tadokoro full-time. Further research verifies that the Japanese archipelago will be pulled into the ocean. This is immediately followed by a massive earthquake in Tokyo causing immense damage and 3,000,000 deaths.

Three months later, Tokyo is slowly recovering. Yamamoto, who lost his wife in the earthquake, works closely with Watari and Tadokoro's team. Their assessment is that another even larger earthquake is on the horizon.

Tadokoro and his team meet with Watari at his secluded mountainside home. Tadokoro reveals his two-phase plan: D1-investigating seismic activity in the Japan Trench, and D2-an evacuation of the Japanese islands. Yamamoto negotiates with countries to accept refugees. Watari describes three options for Plan D2. One is the formation of a new country, a second is immigration and integration into other countries, and a third is a non-response that means passive acceptance of Japan's fate. Onodera, drunk and agonizing over the public's ignorance of the impending disaster, meets Reiko for the first time since the Tokyo earthquake.

The Japan Meteorological Agency reveals devastating news; the original two-year timeline for Japan's sinking is inaccurate, shrinking to just 10 months. Immigration negotiations are sped up, though countries such as South Korea, China and Taiwan are refusing to participate. Shipping and air transport production are increased, and a full announcement of Japan’s fate is released to the public nationwide. Onodera plans to marry Reiko and meet her in Geneva, but they are separated when a new earthquake triggers an eruption of Mount Fuji.

A United Nations summit discusses possible locations for Japan's population. In two months, 2.8 million Japanese have successfully evacuated; the low number frustrates Yamamoto. Japan's sinking accelerates, with the Kii Peninsula and Shikoku submerged. The United States, China and the Soviet Union agree to accept large numbers of refugees, but evacuation estimates only increase to eight million per month. The Sanriku coast, Tōhoku region, Kyushu, Hokkaido and Okinawa are submerged. Sixty-three million Japanese remain on the archipelago, 57% of the original population.

Eleven days before Japan is expected to completely sink, Onodera is shown engaged in rescue efforts, while hoping to reunite with Reiko. Yamamoto later announces a cessation of all JSDF rescue operations.

Watari, on his deathbed, has a final meeting with Tadokoro and Yamamoto. Tadokoro states that he will remain in Japan until the end, and expresses his confidence in Yamamoto's leadership with the Japanese people's uncertain future. Just as a helicopter takes Yamamoto to safety, almost all of Japan has sunk into the ocean. Months later, Reiko is riding in a passenger train in Switzerland, while Onodera is riding in a crowded boxcar in the Southwestern United States to an uncertain future.

== Cast ==
- Keiju Kobayashi as Dr. Tadokoro
- Tetsuro Tamba as Prime Minister Yamamoto
- Hiroshi Fujioka as Onodera Toshio
- Ayumi Ishida as Abe Reiko
- Shogo Shimada as Watari
- Andrew Hughes as Australian Prime Minister
- Nobuo Nakamura as Japanese Ambassador
- Haruo Nakajima as Prime Minister's Chauffeur
- Hideaki Nitani as Dr. Nakata
- Isao Natsuyagi as Yuki
- Akira Nagoya as D-2 Security
- Masaya Takahashi as Professor Yamashiro
- Yusuke Takita as Assistant Professor Yukinaga

American version only

- Lorne Greene as Ambassador Warren Richards
- John Fujioka as Narita
- Rhonda Leigh Hopkins as Fran

== Release ==
Submersion of Japan was released in Japan on 29 December 1973 where it was distributed by Toho.

=== American version ===
American theatrical release poster by John Solie

Roger Corman bought the U.S. rights to the film for his New World Pictures. He cut out a great deal of footage, added new sequences directed by Andrew Meyer and starring Lorne Greene as an ambassador at the United Nations, and released it as Tidal Wave in May 1975.

The American version of the film's new cast members also included Rhonda Leigh Hopkins, John Fujioka, Marvin Miller, Susan Sennett, Ralph James, Phil Roth, Cliff Pellow, and Joe Dante. New World additionally released an uncut subtitled format as Submersion of Japan.

== Box office ==
The film was the highest-grossing film in Japan in 1973 and 1974. The film grossed more than twice of the second-highest-grossing film of the year, The Human Revolution. The film earned ¥4,468,680,000 ($14 million) in Japan. It surpassed The Godfather as the highest-grossing film in Japan until overtaken in December 1974 by The Exorcist.

The film performed weakly at the United States box office, earning $3.5 million, for a combined total of $17,500,000 (equivalent to $126,920,915 in 2025) in Japan and the United States.

== Sources ==
- Galbraith IV, Stuart (2008). The Toho Studios Story: A History and Complete Filmography. Lanham, Md.: Scarecrow Press. ISBN 978-1461673743. OCLC 852899281.
