= Sakyo Komatsu =

Japanese writer (1931–2011)

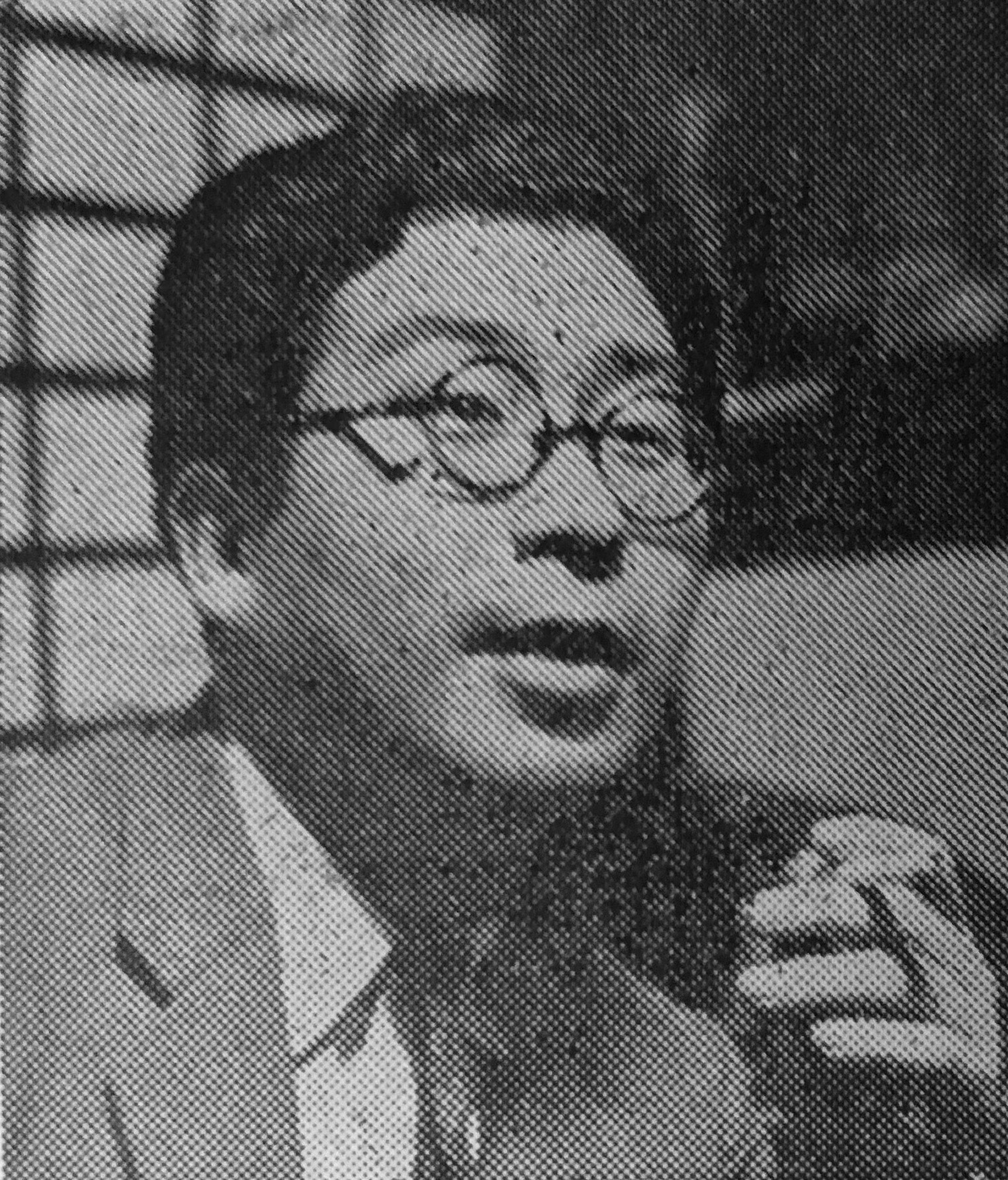
- Born: Minoru Komatsu; January 28, 1931; Osaka, Japan
- Died: July 26, 2011 (aged 80); Minoh, Osaka, Japan
- Education: Kyoto University
- Occupation: Novelist
- Writing career
- Genre: Science fiction
- Subject: Futurology
- Notable work: Japan Sinks
- Notable awards: 1985 Nihon SF Taisho Award

Sakyo Komatsu (小松 左京, Komatsu Sakyō; January 28, 1931 – July 26, 2011) was a leading Japanese science fiction writer and screenwriter.

== Early life ==
Born Minoru "Sakyo" Komatsu in Osaka, he was a graduate of Kyoto University where he studied Italian literature. After graduating, he worked at various jobs, including as a magazine reporter and a writer for stand-up comedy acts.

== Career ==
Komatsu's writing career began in the 1960s. Reading Kōbō Abe and Italian classics made Komatsu feel modern literature and science fiction are the same.

In 1961, he submitted for the 1st Scientific-fiction Contest of Hayakawa's SF Magazine: "Peace on Earth" was a short story in which World War II does not end in 1945 and a young man prepares to defend Japan against the Allied invasion. Komatsu received an honourable mention and 5000 yen.

He won the same contest the following year with the story, "Memoirs of an Eccentric Time Traveller". His first novel, The Japanese Apache, was published two years later and sold 50,000 copies.

In the West he is best known for the novels Japan Sinks (1973) and Sayonara Jupiter (1982). Both were adapted to film, Submersion of Japan (1973) and Bye Bye Jupiter (1984). The story "The Savage Mouth" was translated by Judith Merril and has been anthologized.

At the time of publication, his apocalyptic vision of a sunk Japan wiped out by shifts incurred through geographic stress worried a Japan still haunted by the atomic devastation of Hiroshima and Nagasaki. He was inspired to write it thinking of what would happen if the nationalistic Japanese lost their land, and ironically prefigured the 2011 Tōhoku earthquake and tsunami that triggered a nuclear plant disaster decades later on March 11, 2011 – the result of which he was interested in "to see how Japan would evolve" after the catastrophe.

Komatsu was involved in organizing the Japan World Exposition in Osaka Prefecture in 1970. In 1984, Komatsu served as a technical consultant for a live concert in Linz, Austria, by Japanese electronic composer Isao Tomita. He won the 1985 Nihon SF Taisho Award. Komatsu was one of two Author Guests of Honor at Nippon 2007, the 65th World Science Fiction Convention in 2007 in Yokohama, Japan. This was the first Worldcon to be held in Asia.

With Shin'ichi Hoshi and Yasutaka Tsutsui, Komatsu was considered one of the masters of Japanese science fiction.

== Death ==
Komatsu died on July 26, 2011, in Osaka from complications with pneumonia at the age of 80. Five days before his death, his quarterly publication, Sakyo Komatsu Magazine, released an issue featuring an article on his thoughts about the 2011 tsunami. In the article, Komatsu expressed hope that his country would evolve after the catastrophe. "I had thought I wouldn't mind dying any day ... but now I'm feeling like living a little bit longer and seeing how Japan will go on hereafter," he wrote.

== Works in English translation ==
Novels

- Japan Sinks
- Virus: The Day of Resurrection (Viz Media, 2012)

Short stories

- "The Savage Mouth"
  - The Best Japanese Science Fiction Stories, Dembner Books, 1989 / Barricade Books, 1997
  - Speculative Japan, Kurodahan Press, 2007
- "Take Your Choice" (The Best Japanese Science Fiction Stories, Dembner Books, 1989 / Barricade Books, 1997)
- "The Kudan's Mother" (Kaiki: Uncanny Tales from Japan, Volume 2: Country Delights, Kurodahan Press, 2010)

== Works ==
A complete works collection is being published in on-demand-print format by Jōsai Kokusai Daigaku Shuppankai.

=== Novels ===
- Nihon apatchi zoku (日本アパッチ族) (1964)
- Fukkatsu no hi (復活の日) (1964); English translation: Virus: The Day of Resurrection (2012)
- Asu dorobō (明日泥棒) (1965)
- Esupai (エスパイ) (1965)
- Hateshinaki nagare no hate ni (果てしなき流れの果てに) (1966)
- Goemon no nippon nikki (ゴエモンのニッポン日記) (1966)
- Mishiranu asu (見知らぬ明日) (1969)
- Tsugu no wa dare ka? (継ぐのは誰か？) (1972)
- Nippon chinbotsu (日本沈没) (1973); English translation (abridged): Japan Sinks (1976)
- Dai mitei (題未定) (1977)
- Kochira nippon... (こちらニッポン…) (1977)
- Jikū dōchū hizakurige (時空道中膝栗毛) (1977)
- Sora kara ochite kita rekishi (空から落ちてきた歴史) (1981)
- Sayonara Jupiter (さよならジュピター, Sayonara Jupitā) (1982)
- Toki ya sora chikyū no michiyuki (時也空地球道行) (1988)
- Shuto shōshitsu (首都消失) (1985)
- Kyomu kairō (虚無回廊) (1987, 2000) (unfinished)
- Nihon chinbotsu dai ni bu (日本沈没 第二部) (2006) (co-written with Kōshū Tani)

=== Short story collections ===
- Chi ni wa heiwa o (地には平和を) (1963)
- Kage ga kasanaru toki (影が重なる時) (1964)
- Nihon urimasu (日本売ります) (1965)
- Ikiteiru ana (生きている穴) (1967)
- Kami e no nagai michi (神への長い道) (1967)
- Mokei no jidai (模型の時代) (1968)
- Ueta uchū (飢えた宇宙) (1968)
- Kesshō seidan (結晶星団) (1973)

Manga

- Maboroshi no Komatsu Sakyō Mori Minoru Manga Zenshū (2002)

== Adaptations ==
=== Theatrical film ===
- Submersion of Japan (1973), based on Japan Sinks
- ESPY (1974)
- Virus (1980)
- Bye-Bye Jupiter (1984)
- Tokyo Blackout (1987), based on Shuto shōshitsu
- Sinking of Japan (2006), based on Japan Sinks, remake of Tidal Wave

=== Television ===
- Uchūjin Pipi (1965, NHK)
- Kūchūtoshi 008 (1969, NHK) — Science fiction Marionette drama
- Saru no Gundan (1974, TBS) — Science fiction Tokusatsu drama
- Nihon Chinbotsu (1974, TBS) — Television version of film
- Komatsu Sakyō Anime Gekijō (Sakyo Komatsu's Animation Theater) (1989)
- Japan Sinks: 2020 — Netflix anime adaptation (2020)
- Japan Sinks: People of Hope — TBS live-action series adaptation (2021)
