= Cosmic Princess Kaguya! =

2026 film by Shingo Yamashita

- English release poster
- Kanji: 超かぐや姫！
- Revised Hepburn: Chō Kaguya-hime!
- Directed by: Shingo Yamashita
- Screenplay by: Saeri Natsuo; Shingo Yamashita
- Based on: The Tale of the Bamboo Cutter
- Starring: Yūko Natsuyoshi; Anna Nagase; Saori Hayami
- Cinematography: Daisuke Chiba
- Edited by: Ryōta Kinami
- Music by: Conisch
- Production companies: Studio Colorido; Studio Chromato; Twin Engine
- Distributed by: Netflix (Note: Twin Engine handled the film's distribution for its Japanese theatrical release.)
- Release date: January 22, 2026
- Running time: 142 minutes
- Country: Japan
- Language: Japanese
- Box office: ¥3.6 billion

Cosmic Princess Kaguya! (Japanese: 超かぐや姫！, Hepburn: Chō Kaguya-hime!) is a 2026 Japanese animated musical yuri fantasy film directed by Shingo Yamashita, in his feature directorial debut, from a screenplay he co-wrote with Saeri Natsuo. A reimagining of the folktale The Tale of the Bamboo Cutter, the film follows high school student Iroha Sakayori and Kaguya, a girl from the Moon, as they compete in a streamer tournament within the virtual world of Tsukuyomi. It is produced by Studio Colorido and Studio Chromato with character designs from Akihiro Nagae and Hechima. The film stars the voices of Yūko Natsuyoshi, Anna Nagase, and Saori Hayami.

Netflix announced the film and revealed the main cast and staff in November 2025. The film started development in 2022, with the final product being delivered in September 2025. Its soundtrack consists of an original score composed by Conisch with songs provided by music producers Ryo of Supercell, Yuigot, Aqu3ra, HoneyWorks, 40mP, and Kz of Livetune. The film was released on Netflix on January 22, 2026, along with a limited theatrical release at Laemmle Glendale in California. It later received a theatrical release in Japan from February 20 to June 18; a re-release began on September 18. The film has grossed over ¥3.6 billion.

== Plot ==
In 2030, Iroha Sakayori, a high school student living independently from her family after her father's death, struggles to maintain a tight schedule of study and part-time work while also spending time in the virtual world of Tsukuyomi. On her way home one night, she encounters a glowing utility pole with a baby inside. Reluctantly taking her in, the baby rapidly grows over the span of a few days into a girl of about Iroha's age. The girl, claiming to be from the Moon, is named Kaguya after the Japanese folktale. Dejected by the "depressing" ending of the folktale, Kaguya aims for a "happy" ending with Iroha.

As Iroha's daily life begins to be disrupted by Kaguya, much to her annoyance, she introduces her to Tsukuyomi and its virtual administrator AI, Yachiyo Runami. Together with Kaguya's virtual pet Inudoge, Kaguya and Iroha sign up for the Yachiyo Cup, a streamer tournament where the winners get to perform a live show with Yachiyo. Kaguya quickly becomes a popular streamer with Iroha's help, inadvertently placing them in the crosshairs of Black Onyx, the top streamer group led by Akira Mikado. After the group challenges the pair to a competition in Kassen, a territory battle game in Tsukuyomi, Kaguya learns that Akira is Iroha's estranged brother.

Despite Yachiyo's assistance, Black Onyx wins the Kassen match, but the outpouring of support from fans allows Kaguya and Iroha to win the Yachiyo Cup instead, securing their live show with Yachiyo as well as reconciliation with Akira, who agrees to co-sign a new apartment for the pair. The live show is successful, but after the performance, Tsukuyomi is invaded by mysterious beings, revealed to have come from the moon to bring Kaguya home. Although repelled by Yachiyo, the beings promise to come back by the next full moon, a fact that troubles Iroha, who is now unwilling to part with Kaguya.

On the day of Kaguya's impending departure, as she performs a graduation concert in Tsukuyomi, Iroha fights the lunar forces with the help of Black Onyx and her friends, but they are ultimately unable to stop Kaguya from being taken. Returning to her normal life but unwilling to accept Kaguya's absence, Iroha completes a song she and her father had never finished and sings it. After she does so, she reaches a revelation and logs back into Tsukuyomi, where Yachiyo confirms that she is a future version of Kaguya.

Having been motivated to return to Earth by Iroha's song, Kaguya attempted to travel back in time to reunite with her, but her ship collided with an asteroid, sending her back 8,000 years into the past. Unable to leave her damaged ship, Inudoge (who later became Yachiyo's companion Fushi) served as her communicator, interacting with people over the ages until the creation of Tsukuyomi, where she was uploaded into a virtual avatar.

Determined to bring Kaguya back into the real world, Iroha scraps her plans of becoming a law student and works on creating an android body for Yachiyo to upload her digital consciousness into. After ten years, she succeeds: they can finally be together and continue performing, this time both in real life and Tsukuyomi.

== Voice cast ==
Character	Voice actor	
Character	Japanese	English
Kaguya (かぐや)	Yūko Natsuyoshi	Jeannie Tirado
Iroha Sakayori (酒寄 彩葉, Sakayori Iroha)	Anna Nagase	Dawn M. Bennett
Yachiyo Runami (月見 ヤチヨ, Runami Yachiyo)	Saori Hayami	Ryan Bartley Frankie Kevich (singing)
Fushi (フシ)	Rie Kugimiya	Cassandra Lee Morris
Akira Mikado (帝 アキラ, Mikado Akira)	Miyu Irino	Max Mittelman
Rai Komazawa (駒沢 雷, Komazawa Rai)	Yuma Uchida	A.J. Beckles
Noi Komazawa (駒沢 乃依, Komazawa Noi)	Yoshitsugu Matsuoka	Casey Mongillo
Roka Ayatsumugi (綾紬 芦花, Ayatsumugi Roka)	Yoshino Aoyama	Cassandra Lee Morris
Mami Isayama (諌山 真実, Isayama Mami)	Konomi Kohara	Anairis Quiñones
Otako the Loyal Dog (忠犬オタ公, Chūken Otakō)	Fairouz Ai	Anairis Quiñones
Koto Okkotteru (乙事照 琴, Okkotteru Koto)	Natsuki Hanae	Kieran Regan

== Production ==
In April 2022, Studio Colorido signed a deal with Netflix to co-produce three feature-length anime films for the platform, with the first two films being Drifting Home (2022) and My Oni Girl (2024). In November 2025, Netflix announced that Shingo Yamashita would direct his first feature-length film, Cosmic Princess Kaguya! He had previously directed the web series Pokémon: Twilight Wings and the opening sequences for several anime series, including the first season of Jujutsu Kaisen and Chainsaw Man. After directing Pokémon: Twilight Wings, Twin Engine offered Yamashita to work on an original film. Yamashita's initial plans for the film were rejected since they "lacked elements that would appeal to the public as an original work", after which he created a new proposal whose elements include the metaverse and live streamers. The decision to include Vocaloid producers came after Yamashita realized that Yachiyo's characteristics and design had similarities to Hatsune Miku. He also cited One Piece Film: Red and Needy Girl Overdose as partial influences for the film. The project began development in 2022. The storyboards for the film were completed in June 2024, and an additional year was allotted to finishing the animation. The final product was delivered in September 2025. The film is a reimagining of the Japanese folktale The Tale of the Bamboo Cutter. Yamashita co-wrote the screenplay with Saeri Natsuo. Naoya Nakayama directed the film's musical performances, and Masaya Machida served as the CG director.

Studio Chromato, where Yamashita serves as the representative director, produced the animation with Studio Colorido; the film is Studio Chromato's first production. Akihiro Nagae, who worked on Drifting Home, designed the characters in the film's real world, and illustrator Hechima handled the character designs in the Tsukuyomi world. Yūko Natsuyoshi, Anna Nagase, and Saori Hayami were cast as the main characters Kaguya, Iroha Sakayori, and Yachiyo Runami. In December 2025, Rie Kugimiya was added to the cast as the voice of Fushi. The following month, Netflix revealed seven cast members and the English-language dub cast; the latter includes Jeannie Tirado, Dawn M. Bennett, and Ryan Bartley as the voices of the main characters, with Frankie Kevich providing Yachiyo's singing voice.

== Music ==
Conisch composed the film's score. Six Vocaloid producers provided original songs for the film: "Ex-Otogibanashi" by Ryo of Supercell, "Remember" by Yuigot, "Hoshi Furu Umi" by Aqu3ra, "Watashi wa, Watashi no Koto ga Suki" by HoneyWorks, "Shunkan, Symphony" by 40mP, and "Reply" by Kz of Livetune. "Ex-Otogibanashi" is performed by Hayami and served as the film's main theme song; it was released as a six-track CD single on January 23, 2026. A cover version of Bump of Chicken's song "Ray", performed by Natsuyoshi and Hayami, served as the ending theme song. "CPK! Remix", a four-track CD single, was also released on January 23, 2026, and contains remixes of the film's songs, performed by Nagi Yanagi and Hatsune Miku. The film's score and soundtrack were released on music streaming services on the same day.

The soundtrack peaked at number four on Billboard Japan's Hot Albums chart and at number 14 on Oricon's Combined Albums Chart. It debuted at number four on the Billboard Japan Download Albums chart on January 28, and later topped the chart on February 18. Debuting at third place on February 2, it reached number one on the Oricon Digital Albums Chart on May 13. The cover version of "Ray" also debuted at number 82 on the Billboard Japan Hot 100 chart published on February 11, 2026.

== Themes ==
Cosmic Princess Kaguya! pays homage to and parodies Japanese internet culture since the 1990s, referencing danmaku comments, stickers, emojis, and memes. Daisuke Watanabe from Real Sound calls the film "the first music anime to seriously feature the legacy of Vocaloid culture and streamer culture". A MoguraVR writer points out that the film traces VTuber culture from its dawn around 2018, the fad of team-based esports games, and trends on Nico Nico Douga, while also covering smart contact lens, the metaverse, VRChat, and augmented reality. The film also contains a homage to the Urashima Tarō folktale.

In a discussion between Yamashita and manga artist Tarō Yoneda, Yamashita detailed how they had intentionally avoided overt romantic elements in the film. Reviewers of the film have noted yuri themes within it, with others categorizing the film as yuri. Chu Ah-young of Cineplay described how lyrical change and repetition was used in various instances of the song "Reply" to elucidate yuri themes by demonstrating the emotional transformation of the protagonists.

== Marketing ==
A teaser poster and trailer were released along with the film's announcement on November 5, 2025. The trailer featured a remix of Ryo's 2008 Vocaloid song "World Is Mine", originally performed by Hatsune Miku. Hayami provided the vocals for the remix, titled "World Is Mine CPK! Remix", as her character Yachiyo Runami. Three additional trailers featuring each main character were unveiled in the same month.

The film's main poster and trailer were released in December, followed by a second full trailer in January. Hayami and Natsuyoshi also performed cover versions of five Vocaloid songs published on the film's YouTube channel: "Lonely Universe" by Aqu3ra, "Taketori Overnight Sensation" by HoneyWorks, "Torinoko City" by 40mP, "Yume o Miru Shima" by Yuigot, and "Tell Your World" by KZ. The film has held multiple collaboration events with companies such as Yamaha Corporation, as well as with Fuji City.

The 2026 Sanrio VFes on VRChat included the premiere of a virtual concert featuring Kaguya; the event notably set a record for concurrent users on the platform as a whole (156,716), surpassing a record that had previously been set on New Year's Eve.

== Release ==
Cosmic Princess Kaguya! was released on Netflix on January 22, 2026. It had a commemorative screening at the Grand Cinema Sunshine in Toshima on the same day, and a limited theatrical release was held at Laemmle Glendale in California, U.S., from January 22 to 29. The film was released in 19 Japanese theaters starting on February 20, 2026; it included screenings that allow cheering and waving of glow sticks. Initially a one-week run, the theatrical release was extended beyond February 27 with eight additional theaters that screened the film, and it expanded to over 100 theaters starting on March 13. The film's theatrical run concluded on June 18. A re-release began in 249 theaters on September 18 and included screenings in the MX4D, 4DX, ScreenX, Ultra 4DX, and Dolby Atmos formats.

Twin Engine, Incs Toenter, and Sony Music Solutions released the film on Blu-ray in standard and limited editions on September 9, 2026. The limited edition included an extended version of the film containing scenes that were cut from the Netflix and theatrical releases. The limited edition sold 27,000 copies and the standard edition sold 9,000 copies in its first week, respectively placing first and third on Oricon's Blu-ray Disc rankings.

== Reception ==
=== Viewership and box office ===
The film debuted at seventh place in Netflix's weekly ranking of non-English films, garnering one million views within the tracking period from January 19 to 25. It reached first place in the platform's list of top films in Japan one day after release, and it also ranked within the top 10 in South Korea, Taiwan, Hong Kong, Thailand, and Vietnam. The film received 7.7 million views on Netflix in the first half of 2026, becoming the most-watched anime film in that period.

During its first four days in theaters, the film had grossed over ¥291.2 million (US$1.87 million) from 148,067 admissions. It debuted at fifth place in Kōgyō Tsūshinsha's weekend attendance rankings and also topped the mini-theater rankings for three consecutive weekends. (Note: The film stopped appearing in the mini-theater rankings after its theatrical release was expanded.) The film remained in the top 10 rankings for 11 consecutive weekends. It had grossed ¥2.7 billion from 1.34 million viewers by the end of its original theatrical run. Following the film's re-release, its box office exceeded ¥3 billion from 1.5 million viewers. By November 12, 2026, the film had grossed over ¥3.6 billion.

=== Critical response ===
On the review aggregator website Rotten Tomatoes, 80% of 10 critics' reviews are positive, with rated reviews having an average of 7.7/10. Cath Clarke of The Guardian described the film as a "trippy, high-energy" cyberpunk experience with impressive visuals, while finding the hyperactive plot "dizzying" and the musical numbers unmemorable. Elijah Gonzalez for The A.V. Club gave the film a "C+" grade, praising its "fluid character animation," voice performances, and upbeat soundtrack, but feeling it was hindered by a bloated runtime and a lack of dramatic propulsion, as well as ultimately criticizing the climax for being "romantically cowardly" in resolving the central relationship.

Caroline Cao of Anime News Network praised it as a "fun romp" with eye-popping visual gags, an eclectic score, and an endearing central bond that captures Revolutionary Girl Utena's "sapphic affection," though she noted that clunky screenplay choices and pacing issues ultimately made it a "Gen Z-spirited bloat." Paulo Kawanishi of Polygon gave the film a mixed-to-positive review, also lauding its visuals and animation while criticizing its "undercooked" emotional resolution. On Decider, Maddy Casale gave the film a "Stream It" recommendation, praising its "mesmerizing" virtual reality animation and the "borderline romantic connection" between Iroha and Kaguya that grounds the story, though she cautioned that general audiences unfamiliar with Vocaloid technology might find the plot confusing and the runtime "30 minutes too long."

Shannon Connellan of Mashable highly praised the film as a "triumph" of modern animation and a "vivid environment to experience," celebrating its expert world-building, high-energy editing, and the heartfelt, transcendent love story between its two female leads, though she noted that its two-and-a-half hour runtime made the three-act feature feel like it "could have been a miniseries." Cy Catwell of Anime Feminist also highly praised it as a "fun, colorful, [and] unique" film that would warrant a "4.5/5" rating, celebrating its inventive visual style, Vocaloid-produced soundtrack, and openly queer, sapphic narrative, while noting that a slightly muddled final act and time-skip did little to diminish the emotional resonance of its central love story. Callie Hanna of FandomWire praised Cosmic Princess Kaguya! as "a triumph of beautiful animation and heartfelt storytelling that speaks to universal and timeless truths while capturing the Internet and gaming community better than most other attempts on film."

The Encyclopedia of Science Fiction described Cosmic Princess Kaguya! as an enjoyable and lively anime with likeable protagonists and very good animation, while criticizing its long runtime, rushed ending, and a plot that does not entirely hold together. It considered the film a pleasant science-fiction reworking of The Tale of the Bamboo Cutter, combining its folkloric premise with virtual reality, artificial intelligence, mind uploading, and time travel. The encyclopedia also highlighted the "clearly sapphic" relationship between Iroha and Kaguya and the predominantly female cast, as well as parallels between the virtual world Tsukuyomi and Kaguya's technologically advanced lunar civilization.

=== Accolades ===
Accolades received by Cosmic Princess Kaguya!'
Award	Date of ceremony	Category	Recipient(s)	Result	Ref.
An An Awards	November 14, 2026	Virtual Star	Black Onyx	Won	
Anime Grand Prix	—N/a (Note: Results were announced in the August 2026 issue of Animage, published on July 10, 2026.)	Grand Prix	Cosmic Princess Kaguya!	9th place	
Manga Barcelona Awards	December 5, 2026	Best Anime Movie Premiere	Cosmic Princess Kaguya!	Pending	
Newtype Anime Awards	October 17, 2026	Best Work (Theatrical)	Cosmic Princess Kaguya!	2nd place	
Newtype Anime Awards	October 17, 2026	Best Sound	Conisch, Ryo, Yuigot, Aqu3ra, HoneyWorks, 40mP, and Kz	Won	
Newtype Anime Awards	October 17, 2026	Best Screenplay	Saeri Natsuo and Shingo Yamashita	2nd place	
Newtype Anime Awards	October 17, 2026	Best Character Design	Hechima and Akihiro Nagae	3rd place	
Newtype Anime Awards	October 17, 2026	Best Theme Song	"Ex-Otogibanashi" (by Saori Hayami as Yachiyo Runami)	3rd place	

== Other media ==
A manga adaptation by Tarō Yoneda began serialization with its first two chapters in Kadokawa Shoten's Comptiq magazine on January 9, 2026; later chapters were published in Kadokawa's KadoComi website. The manga's first volume was released on February 10, 2026. A novelization by Naruto Kiriyama with illustrations by Asao Urata was released by Kadokawa on January 30, 2026. Supervised by Yamashita, the novel contains additional scenes not shown in the film. According to Oricon, it sold 163,475 copies, ranking eighth on the paperback chart for the first half of 2026. An 80-page guidebook compiled by Newtype's editorial department, subtitled Happy End no Sono Saki e!, was also published on January 30. Chō Kaguya Meshi!, a spin-off manga by Teruya, is being serialized in Twin Engine's manga website Bibibi Comic. Set ten years after the events of the film, it follows Kaguya and her friends' daily lives as they eat delicious food.

A music video for the cover version of "Ray", directed and storyboarded by Yamashita, was released on January 31, 2026. It contains newly animated footage, with Animate Times stating that it depicts Iroha's childhood, her and Kaguya's daily life, Yachiyo's hidden feelings, and a sequel to the film's story. Melvyn Tan of Anime Trending noted that the music video has "a mix of afterstory content and shots that highlight certain offscreen elements". The music video was played after each screening of the film in Japanese theaters starting on February 27, 2026. It was added to the film's Netflix release as a post-credits scene on April 29.
