= Studio Colorido =

Japanese animation studio

Studio Colorido Co., Ltd.
- Native name: 株式会社スタジオコロリド
- Romanized name: Kabushiki-gaisha Sutajio Kororido
- Type: Kabushiki gaisha
- Industry: Animation studio
- Founded: August 22, 2011; 15 years ago
- Headquarters: Tokyo, Japan
- Key people: Kōji Yamamoto (CEO); Hideo Uda (CEO)
- Number of employees: 106 (As of April 2024)
- Parent: Twin Engine
- Divisions: Studio Colorido Kyoto; Studio Colorido Team Yamahitsuji
- Website: https://colorido.co.jp/

Studio Colorido Co., Ltd. (Japanese: 株式会社スタジオコロリド, Hepburn: Kabushiki-gaisha Sutajio Kororido) is a Japanese animation studio subsidiary of Twin Engine.

== History ==
The company was established by producer Hideo Uda in 2011. The studio follows a principle of "making a place where people involved in anime can continue to work peacefully and to contribute to the further development of Japanese animation culture". The "Colorido" in the studio's name translates to "rich in color" or "colorful" in Portuguese and Spanish.

Years later, the company entered a business partnership with company Twin Engine and became a subsidiary in the network, with Twin Engine CEO Kōji Yamamoto becoming co-CEO.

In April 2022, Studio Colorido signed a multi-year co-production deal with Netflix. The first was Drifting Home which was released in September that same year. The second was My Oni Girl, which was released in May 2024. The third, Cosmic Princess Kaguya!, was released on January 22, 2026.

== Productions ==
=== Feature films ===
Year	Title	Director(s)	Dur.	Note(s)	Refs.
2018	Penguin Highway	Hiroyasu Ishida	118m	Based on the sci-fi novel of the same name by Tomihiko Morimi. First theatrical feature film.	
2020	A Whisker Away	Junichi Sato; Tomotaka Shibayama	104m	Original work. Released simultaneously in Japanese theaters and on Netflix globally.	
2022	Drifting Home	Hiroyasu Ishida	120m	Original work. First of a 3-film deal with Netflix. Released simultaneously in Japanese theaters and as a Netflix exclusive worldwide.	
2024	My Oni Girl	Tomotaka Shibayama	112m	Original work. Second of a 3-film deal with Netflix. Released simultaneously in Japanese theaters and as a Netflix exclusive worldwide.	
2026	Cosmic Princess Kaguya!	Shingo Yamashita	142m	Original work. Co-production with Studio Chromato. Third of a 3-film deal with Netflix. Released as a Netflix exclusive worldwide.	

==== Short films ====
Year	Title	Director(s)	Dur.	Note(s)	Refs.
2013	Shashinkan	Takashi Nakamura	17m		
2013	Sonny Boy and Dewdrop Girl	Hiroyasu Ishida	18m		
2013	Wonder Garden	Yôjirô Arai	4m		
2014	Paulette's Chair	Hiroyasu Ishida	3m		
2015	Typhoon Noruda	Yōjirō Arai	27m	Original work. Licensed by Sentai Filmworks for home media.	
2015	Bubu & Bubulina	Takashi Nakamura	8m	Produced for the Japan Animator Expo.	
2023	Burn the Witch #0.8	Tatsuro Kawano	29m	Based on the manga Burn the Witch by Tite Kubo. Released on Crunchyroll.	

=== Original net animations ===
Year	Title	Director(s)	Eps.	Note(s)	Refs.
2014–2019	Fastening Days	Hiroyasu Ishida	12	Original work. Released on YouTube.	
2020	Pokémon: Twilight Wings	Shingo Yamashita	8	Based on the Pokémon franchise by Satoshi Tajiri; Inspired by the 2019 video games Pokémon Sword and Shield; All episodes, except #2 (Training); Released on YouTube.	
2020-2026	Pokétoon	Shingo Yamashita; Cédric Hérole	20	Based on the Pokémon franchise by Satoshi Tajiri; Episode 3 (Blossom's Dream) and 4 (Wait For Me, Magikarp); Yamashita directed Episode 3 and Hérole directed Episode 4 Released on YouTube.	
2020	Burn the Witch	Tatsuro Kawano	—N/a	A 63-minute ONA film Based on the manga of the same name by Tite Kubo. Released on Crunchyroll.	
2021	Star Wars: Visions	Taku Kimura	—N/a	Based/Inspired by the Star Wars franchise by George Lucas "Tatooine Rhapsody"; Released on Disney+.	
