= Yurei Deco =

Japanese anime television series

- Key visual

ユーレイデコ (Yūreideko)
- Genre: Mystery
- Created by: Masaaki Yuasa; Dai Satō
- Anime television series
- Directed by: Tomohisa Shimoyama
- Written by: Dai Satō
- Music by: Mito; Kōtarō Saitō; Yebisu303
- Studio: Science Saru
- Licensed by: Crunchyroll; SA/SEA: Medialink
- Original network: Tokyo MX, MBS, BS NTV
- Original run: July 3, 2022 – September 18, 2022
- Episodes: 12
- Manga
- Illustrated by: Digital Shokunin Studio
- Published by: Line Corporation
- Magazine: Line Manga
- Original run: July 8, 2022 – present

Yurei Deco (ユーレイデコ, Yūrei Deko; Stylized as You 0 Deco) is an original Japanese anime television series directed by Tomohisa Shimoyama, written by Dai Satō, and animated by Science Saru. It aired from July to September 2022. A webtoon adaptation with art by Digital Shokunin Studio has been serialized online via Line Corporation's Line Manga website since July of the same year.

== Synopsis ==
The story takes place on Tom Sawyer Island, where everyone's lives revolve around the use of an augmented reality system known as Deco and a currency known as Love. Berry, an average girl with a damaged Deco that shows her things others can't see, meets Hack, a girl who looks like a boy. Charmed by Hack, Berry meets up with the team Hack leads, the Yurei Detective Club. Members of this club are "socially dead," working invisibly within the digitally controlled society of Tom Sawyer Island. As she works with the group, Berry learns about Phantom ZERO, a mysterious figure who lurks within Tom Sawyer's underground. She and Hack decide to chase down this figure, and in time, the truth behind the city is revealed...

== Characters ==
=== Yurei Detective Club ===
Berry (ベリィ, Beri)
Voiced by: Mira Kawakatsu
A curious girl who is keen on solving the mystery behind Phantom ZERO. Due to a glitch in the DECO installed in her right eye, she is able to see things other normal citizens can't, leading to her encounter with Hack. After being declared dead following the rescue of Hack, she becomes a member of the Yurei Detective Club.
Hack (ハック, Hakku)
Voiced by: Anna Nagase
A child of unknown origin who uses a variety of gadgets such as cloaking devices and programmable paper airplanes.
Finn (フィン, Fin)
Voiced by: Miyu Irino
The head of the Yurei Detective Club.
Hank (ハンク, Hanku)
Voiced by: Setsuji Satō
A laid back member of the Yurei Detective Club.
Madam 44 (マダム44, Madamu 44)
Voiced by: Sayuri Sadaoka
An elderly woman who works with the Yurei Detective Club through a remotely controlled robot.
Smiley (スマイリー, Sumairī)
Voiced by: Rie Kugimiya
A young girl and member of the Yurei Detective Club who hides her face behind a gas mask. She is Madam 44's granddaughter.
Mister Watson (ミスターワトソン, Mitsutā Watoson)
A peculiar member of the Yurei Detective club who wears a suit and a large cat mask. He does not speak, and only occasionally writes sentences on his notepad.

=== Other characters ===
Masial (マシアル, Mashiaru)
Voiced by: Takeshi Miyajima
Berry's father, who works at the Customer Center as a content censor for Tom Sawyer Island.
Lamp (ランプ, Rampu)
Voiced by: Haruka Shimizu
Berry's mother, who works alongside Masial at the Customer Center.
Logi (ロジ, Roji)
Voiced by: Kazutomi Yamamoto
Berry's classmate, who uses an apple-based avatar.
Harper (ハーパー, Hāpā)
Voiced by: Yumiko Matsuura
Berry's classmate, who uses an anteater-based avatar.
Phantom Zero (怪人ゼロ, Kaijin Zero)
A mysterious figure at the heart of Tom Sawyer Island. While most know of Phantom Zero as a phantom thief wolfman from a video game, its actual appearance is of a woman with a glitched out face.

== Media ==
=== Anime ===
The original anime series is animated by Science Saru and directed by Tomohisa Shiroyama, with scripts by Dai Sato. It aired from July 3 to September 18, 2022, on Tokyo MX, MBS, and BS NTV. The opening theme song is "1,000,000,000,000,000,000,000 LOVE" by Clammbon, and the ending theme song is "Aimuin Love" by Hack'nBerry (Mira Kawakatsu and Anna Nagase). Crunchyroll streamed the series.

==== Episode list ====
No.	Title	Directed by	Written by	Storyboarded by	Original release date
1	"The Adventures in Tom Sawyer"; Transliteration: "Tomu Sōya de no Bōken" (Japanese: トムソーヤでの冒険)	Tomohisa Shimoyama	Dai Satō	Tomohisa Shimoyama	July 3, 2022
On the island city of Tom Sawyer, society is run through a social credit system called Decoration Customizer, or "Deco" for short. Citizens work to collect "Love", which acts as a currency for services and to improve their Deco avatars, which are displayed through a holographic augmented reality system implanted in their eyes. Berry is a young girl who is obsessed with finding Zero, a mythical criminal who is said to reduce the Love of anybody he encounters to zero. On the way to a doctor to get a faulty Deco display in her right eye repaired, Berry catches sight of a person who is invisible to Deco sight playing pranks and scamming people out of their Love. Believing the thief to be Zero, Berry gives chase but fails to catch the thief. Using a recovered surveillance device, Berry forces another confrontation with the thief until they're both caught in a Zero Phenomenon event, where a figure the thief identifies as Zero appears before them.
2	"The Mysterious Stranger"; Transliteration: "Fushigi na Yosomono" (Japanese: 不思議なよそ者)	Tooru Hasuya	Dai Satō	Tooru Hasuya, Tomohisa Shimoyama, Mari Motohashi, Karin Noguchi	July 10, 2022
The thief attempts to attack Zero, and while Zero appears to be completely invulnerable, the thief as able to steal some data from it. Zero then retaliates, forcing Berry and the thief to flee though an exit the thief finds in Zero's Hyperverse space. Upon returning to reality, Berry loses consciousness and the thief is forced to flee from authorities. The authorities proceed to swiftly cover up the Zero Phenomenon by quietly restoring the Love count of everybody in the affected area. The next day, Berry heads to her doctor's appointment, where it is confirmed her right Deco is malfunctioning, but she refuses to have it replaced so she can continue following the thief's trail. To investigate further, Berry hacks into her father's Hyperverse workstation, where she witnesses government censors actively deleting all data related to negative events, including anything related to the thief. Her parents catch her and admit that as content moderators, it is their job to censor information to protect society. Disillusioned that the government has been effectively lying to everybody, Berry decides to run away to continue her search for the thief. She heads to a location the thief left for her, only to encounter a stranger who asks her where "Hack" is.
3	"A Sham Trial"; Transliteration: "Shikumareta Saiban" (Japanese: 仕組まれた裁判)	Takuya Fujikura	Dai Satō	Takuya Fujikura	July 17, 2022
Berry finds out from the stranger, a man named Finn, that Hack was captured by the authorities, and will be put on trial for the Zero Phenomenon. Finn then leads Berry to his hideout, explaining that he is a "Yurei", one of many unregistered people on the island who have no access to a Deco and therefore exist outside of the system, and are effectively treated as ghosts. Upon hearing that Hack will be put on trial, Berry produces the data Hack had given to her, in hopes it will prove Hack isn't responsible for the Zero Phenomenon. Finn helps Berry by extracting the data in an isolated Hyperverse. Berry then infiltrates Hack's trial disguised as a defense attorney and presents the evidence. Unfortunately, Berry's faulty Deco causes her disguise to break down, but Zero hacks the robot acting as the prosecutor, giving Berry the distraction she needs to help Hack escape. They board a freight train to make their getaway, but the authorities pursue them. The train then explodes and crashes into the sea, apparently killing both Berry and Hack.
4	"The Yurei Detective Club"; Transliteration: "Yūrei Tanteidan" (Japanese: ユーレイ探偵団)	Kim Min-sun	Dai Satō	Mari Motohashi	July 24, 2022
Four months have passed since the incident, and it's revealed that Finn helped fake Berry and Hack's deaths. However, since Berry is now considered legally dead, she has lost access to her Love and has become a Yurei. With little other choice, Berry has moved to a Yurei settlement and joined Finn's Yurei Detective Club, whose main objective is to find the cause behind the Zero Phenomenon so they can prove Berry and Hack's innocence. One day, a man named Matsumame arrives and requests the YDC's assistance in finding his Deco avatar, which has gone missing. Because it went missing around the time of the Zero Phenomenon, Berry agrees to take the case. Using her newly acquired Deco camouflage, Berry returns to the city to investigate and manages to infiltrate her parents' workstation, where she manages to recover Matsumame's avatar which was accidentally deleted by Customer Service. She also overhears her parents mourning her apparent death, as well as learns of the existence of a secret backup system that stores all of the city's uncensored data. With a new lead, Berry decides to stay with the YDC and witnesses Hack capture a robotic pigeon carrying a message.
5	"On the Trail of a Liar"; Transliteration: "Usotsuki Nue o Otte" (Japanese: うそつき鵺を追って)	Tetsurō Karai	Kimiko Ueno	Tetsurō Karai	July 31, 2022
The message is from the Professor, who runs the Neo Animal Museum which acts as a zoo featuring artificial animals. The Professor has built a replica of a Nue and insists his depiction is the realistic one, while the depiction in Decopedia is false. He asks the YDC to rewrite the Decopedia article on the Nue to show its true form. Berry and Hack sneak into the Decopedia Hyperverse to modify the Nue file. However, they get distracted and create a creature that looks nothing like a Nue. The modified Nue then escapes from Berry and Hack and distributes itself across the city network, starting a new Nue craze. The Professor, furious at their failure, refuses to pay for the job. However, Madam 44 reveals that she had managed to find a physical book stating that Nue are fictional creatures, meaning both the Professor and Decopedia are wrong. Berry and Hack get into an argument over whether to tell the Professor or not, until Berry accidentally lets slip that she tried to view Hack's profile in Customer Service's database, which angers Hack. Berry visits the Professor, who admits he knew the Nue was fictional all along and reluctantly deletes his Nue. Soon, the Decopedia entry on the Nue is deleted and society moves on to an axolotl craze. Berry feels disillusioned from these events, and Finn advises she apologize to Hack, since even Yurei have pasts they would like to keep private. Berry tries to apologize until she finds out Hack hacked into her school files. Meanwhile, the Professor scraps plans to recreate the Yeti and Loch Ness Monster. Later, a new client approaches the YDC.
6	"Smiley and the Flying Lost One"; Transliteration: "Sumairī no Tobi Maigo" (Japanese: スマイリーの跳び迷子)	Yūta Takamura	Dai Satō	Gōichi Iwahata	August 7, 2022
Smiley encounters an AI drone named Doron and brings it to YDC. Doron explains it lost its memories and is looking for its owner. Finn and Hack aren't interested, but Berry, Smiley, Hank, and Watson decide to take up the case. Hank examines Doron and figures out that it is an illegally built drone. Berry uses the parts numbers to track the identity of the person who built Doron, a man named Kearney. Berry investigates Kearney's last known location, which turns out to be a retirement home, but finds out he's not a registered resident. However, she does encounter Smiley and Madam 44. Madam 44 reveals that Smiley is actually her granddaughter, and she herself personally knew Kearney in the past, but she doesn't know his current location. Berry is forced to flee when security is alerted, but Doron is damaged protecting her. Back at the YDC headquarters, Hank repairs Doron while Berry, Hack, and Finn are able to fully decode his memories. Kearney was a famed programmer also known by the nickname "Hackitt", who is Finn's idol in the field of programming. However, it is revealed that Kearney is already deceased. Berry and Smiley head to the graveyard where they find Madam 44 paying respects to Kearney's grave. Meanwhile, Finn confides to Hank and Watson that he suspects Kearney was murdered by the government to cover up a dangerous secret.
7	"The Inhuman Cart"; Transliteration: "Hitodenashi no Yatai" (Japanese: ひとでなしの屋台)	Miki Sakaibara	Kimiko Ueno	Dashiyo Hatsumi	August 14, 2022
Watson recovers what appears to be a peacock feather but nobody knows its origin. Berry then sees Watson collecting information from local residents about the presence of a mythical ramen cart. She learns that Watson's hobby is collecting rumors, but he's particularly interested in investigating the ramen cart because it's a rumor that has persisted far longer than any other. Berry decides to help Watson's investigation, but her attempts at tracing the rumor bear no results. However, Watson is able to recover a map that supposed leads to the ramen cart. Berry and Hack accompany Watson and they journey through many underground tunnels and back alleys until they reach a spot that doesn't appear on the map. There, they finally find the ramen cart, manned by an AI named Analytica. Analytica explains that it used to be an engineering AI that built much of Tom Sawyer, including a special project called Mark Twain. However, it decided to go rogue and set up a ramen cart, deliberately erasing all mentions of it online so it could study the nature of rumors. Suddenly, a Zero Phenomenon occurs and Phantom Zero attacks. Analytica manages to open an exit but is destroyed in the process, while Phantom Zero is able to steal some of Hack's data before withdrawing. The trio return to report their findings to the rest of the YDC, with Finn becoming interested at the mention of Mark Twain. Later, it's shown that Watson had recovered an identical peacock feather from Analytica's body, and he looks up to what appears to be a floating city in the sky.
8	"Reach for the Heavens!"; Transliteration: "Tengoku ni Te o Nobase!" (Japanese: 天国に手を伸ばせ！)	Tooru Hasuya	Dai Satō	Dashiyo Hatsumi	August 21, 2022
During the night, Berry notices Finn working on a project in very late hours. Later, Hank receives a tip about the government closing off a section of the ocean to recover a falling satellite. Meanwhile, Hack and Finn analyze Kearney's hidden data inside the peacock feather and find a special access ID. When Berry and Hank mention the satellite, Finn concludes the government is looking to recover a data capsule that the satellite will eject, which contains secret government data. The entire club then works toward a plan to recover the capsule before the government can. Berry then asks Hank why Finn doesn't use a Deco, and he explains Finn gets physically sick whenever he uses one. on the day of the operation, Finn feeds false coordinates to the government while Berry, Hack, Smiley, and Madam 44 catch the capsule. However, once they return to their base, Finn reveals that the capsule was damaged and he hasn't been able to recover any data from it. However, the rest of the club becomes suspicious and confronts Finn later that night, catching him in the act of analyzing the capsule. Finn admits that the created the YDC to pursue his own agenda, and now that he has gotten what he was looking for, he decides to dissolve the club.
9	"Burning Brand"; Transliteration: "Moeru Rakuin" (Japanese: 燃える烙印)	Makoto Sokuza	Kimiko Ueno	Gōichi Iwahata	August 28, 2022
Hack and Berry hack into Finn's personal data to find out why he dissolved the club and find data as a past. As a child, Finn was born with Deco sickness and always felt like an outcast, even among the Yurei. With no real family, Finn lived with other Yurei as a part of a makeshift family, and he always looked up to Bro, who he considered an older brother. However, Finn began to notice more trash and pollution building up in the neighborhood, and realized that the local waste management center had gone offline. Knowing that the district will eventually become uninhabitable, Finn tried to warn the government, but since he was a Yurei, they considered his login illegal and raided the district, confiscating any illegal Decos they could find. This caused rumors to spread that Finn and his family were informants, resulting in them becoming pariahs. Angry at Finn, Bro yelled at him that they aren't a true family and Finn fled in shame. Hack and Berry relay this information to the rest of the club, and they confront Finn at the old waste management center where Hack convinces Finn that he can share his troubles with the club. The club helps Finn repair the waste management center, but Hank discovers that restarting the waste management system will also reset all the Love in the area to zero. Upon hearing about this, an angry mob forms, led by Bro, who accuse the club of being Phantom Zero.
10	"2 Fathoms to Heaven?"; Transliteration: "Tengoku Made Ni Fazomu?" (Japanese: 天国まで2ファゾム？)	Misu Yamaneko	Dai Satō	Dashiyo Hatsumi	September 4, 2022
The mob begins spreading the club's pictures over the Deco network declaring them to be Phantom Zero, which spreads rapidly over the entire island and setting off a massive manhunt from both the government and populace. The club is forced to take shelter in one of Finn's hideouts with their headquarters is raided, and Finn reasons they have to find the real Phantom Zero to prove their innocence. To do this, Madam 44 recovers the data stolen from Mark Twain and passes it on to Finn before she, Smiley and Watson are arrested. Finn leads Hack and Berry to the Professor's zoo to use his Hyperspace equipment to analyze the data. Meanwhile, Berry's parents find out she is still alive and covertly edit data to mislead the manhunt until they are caught and arrested. Hack is able to analyze the data and discovers Phantom Zero is hiding out in Mark Twain itself. Hank breaks the other club members out of prison and they perform distraction operations while Berry, Hack, and Finn using Doron and his fellow drones to fly up to Mark Twain.
11	"A Second Twist of Fate"; Transliteration: "Unmei wa Futatabi Kawaru" (Japanese: 運命は二度変わる)	Tooru Hasuya	Kimiko Ueno	Hiroko Kazui, Mari Motohashi	September 11, 2022
Berry, Hack, and Finn manage to reach Mark Twain and enter it, discovering that it is the backup storage for all of Tom Sawyer's data. Berry and Hack connect to Mark Twain's Hyperverse where they try to find Phantom Zero's identity, but Berry comes across the data showing how her parents helped mislead the government's manhunt and their subsequent arrest, and she feels guilty for getting them involved in the situation. Hack suggests simply deleting all of the data of their wrongdoing, which would also require Berry deleting all evidence she ever existed. Before Berry can make the choice, the security system detects them and they are forced to flee. Meanwhile, in Tom Sawyer, the rest of the club members meet up at Hank's boat. Learning that Berry, Hack and Finn have successfully reached Mark Twain, the decide to come up with plan to help them get back to the surface. Back in Mark Twain, Hack is forcibly pulled into the Hyperverse by Phantom Zero where they battle, and Hack is able to damage Phantom Zero, partially revealing its true identity. Finn leads Berry to Mark Twain's core, where he explains the true power behind Mark Twain and Phantom Zero's creator is an entity called "Injunction Jo". Finn reconnects Berry to Mark Twain's Hyperverse so she can help Hack. Finn then tries to carry Berry and Hack's bodies to safety, but he is quickly surrounded by security robots.
12	"Home of the Greatest Secret"; Transliteration: "Saikō ni Himitsu no Basho" (Japanese: 最高に秘密の場所)	Tomohisa Shimoyama	Dai Satō	Tomohisa Shimoyama	September 18, 2022
Berry enters the Hyperverse to find Hack trapped in a simulation living an idyllic life with her parents. Berry helps Hack break out of the simulation, where they are congratulated by Injunction Jo herself. They are both woken up in the real world and meet Jo in person, who reveals that she is the administrator of the Deco system that controls all of Tom Sawyer, and as such can change and modify how the island runs as she sees fit. She also admits that she has become tired of her role and has been seeking out a suitable successor in the guise of Phantom Zero. Impressed with how Hack was able to make her way to Mark Twain, Jo challenges Hack to take on her role to see how she will lead Tom Sawyer in the future. Afterwards, Berry and Finn are returned to the surface and to cover their escape, the rest of club hacks Decos of everybody on the island to look like Phantom Zero, causing mass confusion. A year later, it's revealed that Hack changed the system to allow more ways of attaining Love, banned censorship, and incorporated the Yurei districts. The charges against Berry and her parents are dropped and they resume their normal lives, Hank continues his salvage business, Smiley and Madam 44 continue to live together, Watson inherits Analytica's ramen cart, Finn returns to his old neighborhood to help clean it up and makes amends with Bro, and Jo leaves for an adventure across the sea. However, Berry mulls over how Hack has never made contact ever since taking over Mark Twain, until she catches sight of one of Hack's paper airplanes and follows it back to her, and the two happily reunite.

=== Webtoon ===
A webtoon adaptation with art by Digital Shokunin Studio has been serialized online via Line Corporation's Line Manga website since July 8, 2022.
