= Penguin Highway =

2010 Japanese science fiction novel by Tomihiko Morimi

- The cover of the novel, as published by Kadokawa Shoten in 2010

ペンギン・ハイウェイ (Pengin Haiwei)
- Genre: Coming-of-age; Science fiction
- Novel
- Written by: Tomihiko Morimi
- Published by: Kadokawa Shoten
- English publisher: NA: Yen Press
- Published: May 28, 2010
- Manga
- Written by: Keito Yano
- Published by: Media Factory
- English publisher: NA: Yen Press
- Magazine: Monthly Comic Alive
- Original run: March 27, 2018 – February 27, 2019
- Volumes: 3
- Anime film
- Directed by: Hiroyasu Ishida
- Produced by: Taku Matsuo; Noriko Ozaki; Katsuhiro Takei
- Written by: Makoto Ueda (Europe Kikaku)
- Music by: Umitarō Abe
- Studio: Studio Colorido
- Licensed by: AUS: Madman Entertainment; BI: Anime Limited; NA: Eleven Arts
- Released: July 29, 2018 (Fantasia International Film Festival); August 17, 2018 (Japan)
- Runtime: 118 minutes

Penguin Highway (Japanese: ペンギン・ハイウェイ, Hepburn: Pengin Haiwei; stylized penguin highway) is a Japanese science fiction novel written by Tomihiko Morimi, published in 2010. A manga adaptation was serialized in Media Factory's Monthly Comic Alive from March 2018 to February 2019, and an anime film adaptation by Studio Colorido premiered in August 2018.

== Plot ==
Penguins suddenly appear in the town with no explanation. Aoyama finds that the penguin species is known to follow a singular path known as the "Penguin Highway," which leads to the woods. After the bully Suzuki ties Aoyama up to a vending machine, the Lady frees Aoyama and transforms a soda can into a penguin.

At school, Aoyama finds Uchida and his other classmate Hamamoto with a penguin named Penta on the rooftop. They bring Penta on the train, where it falls ill upon leaving the station. Penta stumbles out of the cage and transforms into a soda can. Aoyama then goes to a cafe to play chess with the Lady, where she mentions her trouble sleeping after reading about the Jabberwock. The power goes out, and she accidentally transforms the pieces into bats. Aoyama later deduces that the Lady can turn thrown objects into penguins in the light and bats in the dark.

The next day, Hamamoto leads Aoyama and Uchida deep into the forest, where a floating sphere of water sits, which she calls the "sea". The next few days, Aoyama, Uchida and Hamamoto, spend playing around the sea and investigating it. Uchida throws in a toy spaceship into the sphere, and it sucks up the toy. One day, Suzuki comes to bully Uchida and Aoyama, happening upon the sphere, and Hamamoto warns him not to tell anyone about the sphere.

The next day, the reporters note a new unidentified creature has been discovered. Aoyama and Uchida spot the creature eating a penguin. The Lady asks Aoyama to go to the coast with her, and they depart by train. As they leave the station, the Lady falls ill. Her sweat falls onto the ground, liquifying the concrete into the creature — a Jabberwock. He does not see the Lady after that for a while.

After school, Hamamoto and Uchida go to find the forest blocked off. Entering despite the warnings, they find Hamamoto's father conducting research, with Suzuki revealing the sphere's location. A huge storm brews as the sphere grows in size. The next day, it is revealed that the sphere has expanded to a dangerous extent, leading to the disappearance of Hamamoto's father. The school holds a lockdown, and Aoyama escapes to meet up with the Lady.

Aoyama solves the mystery. The sea is the energy source for both the penguins and the Lady, but the penguins try to destroy it. The sea displaces space and distorts time. Aoyama believes the sea is a hole, a place where the world is torn. The penguins are trying to destroy it in an attempt to repair the world. However, making too many penguins causes the Lady to fall ill. In response, she produces the creature, known as the Jabberwock. These attack the penguins, which makes the sphere larger and result in her improved health.

Aoyama and the Lady walk toward the forest, generating a mob of penguins. They blast their way into the sphere and land into the apocalyptic future. Aoyama and the Lady rescue Hamamoto's father and the other researchers. The penguins fly up and pop the sphere, causing water to rush out into the real world.

Aoyama and the Lady return to the cafe to talk, while the mob of penguins slowly disappear. When the last penguin disappears, she hugs Aoyama and leaves the cafe. Outside of the window, she disappears. He resolves not to cry, believing he will see her again and will tell her that he loved her.

== Characters ==
Aoyama (アオヤマ君, Aoyama-kun)
Voiced by: Kana Kita (Japanese); Gideon Modisett (English)
A precocious boy who keeps a notebook of things he learns. He has a crush on the Lady and a fascination with breasts. He has never seen the ocean.
Lady (お姉さん, Onē-san)
Voiced by: Yū Aoi (Japanese); Erika Harlacher (English)
A mysterious woman working at the dental office. She coaches Aoyama in chess. She has memories of her parents and growing up by the coast. It is revealed she is from the world of the sphere.
Uchida (ウチダ君, Uchida-kun)
Voiced by: Rie Kugimiya (Japanese); Landon Beattie (English)
A shy boy and one of Aoyama's friends. He is bullied by Suzuki.
Hamamoto (ハマモトさん, Hamamoto-san)
Voiced by: Megumi Han (Japanese); Anne Yatco (English)
An intelligent girl who has a crush on Aoyama. She is jealous of the Lady.
Suzuki (スズキ君, Suzuki-kun)
Voiced by: Miki Fukui
A classmate of Aoyama's and a bully. He has a crush on Hamamoto.
Aoyama's Father (アオヤマ君のお父さん, Aoyama-kun no Otōsan)
Voiced by: Hidetoshi Nishijima (Japanese); Keith Silverstein (English)
A well-posed man. He leaves for international work trips.
Hamamoto's Father (ハマモトさんのお父さん, Hamamoto-san no Otōsan)
Voiced by: Naoto Takenaka (Japanese); Eugene Nomura (English)
A meteorological researcher who has an interest in the sphere, after reading his daughter's journal.

== Media ==
=== Novel ===
Penguin Highway is a novel written by Tomihiko Morimi, which was originally published by Kadokawa Bunko in tankōbon format on May 28, 2010. Kadokawa later republished the novel under the Kadokawa Bunko imprint on November 22, 2012. An audiobook version was released on March 3, 2017. Upon the release of the film, Kadokawa republished the novel with a new cover illustration by Booota under the Kadokawa Tsubasa Bunko imprint on June 15, 2018.

Yen Press announced at Anime Expo 2018 that they would be publishing the novel in English, with a hardcover release on April 23, 2019. The English translation is by Andrew Cunningham.

=== Manga ===
A manga adaptation of the novel was serialized from March 27, 2018, to February 27, 2019, in Media Factory's Monthly Comic Alive magazine, with illustrations by Keito Yano. The manga was published in three tankōbon format volumes, with the first volume released on July 23, 2018, and the last on May 23, 2019.

In January 2024, Yen Press announced that they licensed the manga for English publication. They released all three volumes in a single omnibus on July 16, 2024.

=== Anime film ===
An anime film adaptation by Studio Colorido was announced on March 1, 2018. Hiroyasu Ishida serves as the director for the film, with Yōjirō Arai responsible for character design, Makoto Ueda writing the screenplay, and Umitarō Abe composing the music. The theme song is Good Night, performed by Hikaru Utada.

The film premiered at Fantasia International Film Festival in Montreal on July 29, 2018. Toho released the film theatrically in Japan on August 17, 2018. It was released on Blu-ray and DVD in Japan on January 30, 2019. Fuji Creative is responsible for international distribution of the film. Anime Limited announced in July 2018 that they had acquired the film for distribution in the United Kingdom and Ireland, where it premiered at Scotland Loves Anime Glasgow on October 13, 2018, with a wider release in 2019. Eleven Arts announced that they would be distributing the film theatrically in North America, where it premiered at Crunchyroll Expo in San Jose on September 2, 2018, and a wider release on April 12, 2019. Madman Entertainment announced that they had acquired the film for distribution in Australia and New Zealand, where it premiered at Madman Anime Festival Melbourne on September 15, 2018, with a wider release premiering from November 8, 2018. The film was released on DVD, Blu-ray and digital on August 6, 2019, from Shout! Factory.

== Reception ==
=== Novel ===
The novel won the Nihon SF Taisho Award in 2010.

=== Anime film ===
Penguin Highway received the Excellence Award in the animation category at the 22nd Japan Media Arts Festival. The film won the Axis: The Satoshi Kon Award for Excellence in Animation award at Fantasia International Film Festival for the best animated feature. In Japan, the film premiered in 192 theatres in its opening weekend, where it placed in 10th position. The film later exited the top 10, having earned a total of ¥307 million (US$2.76 million) as of August 26, 2018.

The review aggregator website Rotten Tomatoes reported that 100% of critics have given the film a positive review based on 24 reviews, with an average rating of 7.7/10. On Metacritic, the film has a weighted average score of 82 out of 100 based on 4 critics, indicating "universal acclaim".
