= Burn the Witch (manga) =

Japanese manga series

- First tankōbon volume, featuring Ninny Spangcole
- Genre: Action, fantasy
- Manga

One-shot
- Written by: Tite Kubo
- Published by: Shueisha
- English publisher: NA: Viz Media
- Magazine: Weekly Shōnen Jump
- English magazine: NA: Weekly Shonen Jump
- Published: July 14, 2018
- Manga
- Written by: Tite Kubo
- Published by: Shueisha
- English publisher: NA: Viz Media
- Imprint: Jump Comics
- Magazine: Weekly Shōnen Jump
- Original run: August 24, 2020 – present
- Volumes: 1
- Anime film
- Directed by: Tatsuro Kawano
- Written by: Ryomura Chinatsu
- Music by: Keiji Inai
- Studio: Studio Colorido
- Licensed by: Crunchyroll; Viz Media; (home video); SA/SEA: Muse Communication
- Released: October 2, 2020
- Runtime: 63 minutes
- Anime television film

Burn the Witch #0.8
- Directed by: Tatsuro Kawano
- Written by: Taku Kishimoto
- Music by: Hiroaki Tsutsumi
- Studio: Studio Colorido
- Licensed by: Crunchyroll
- Original network: TV Tokyo
- Released: December 30, 2023
- Runtime: 29 minutes
- icon

Burn the Witch (stylized as BURN ☩HE WITCH) is a Japanese manga series written and illustrated by Tite Kubo. It was first published in Shueisha's Weekly Shōnen Jump as a one-shot chapter in July 2018. A serialized continuation of the one-shot is being published in the same magazine with a seasonal release schedule. The four-chapter first season was published from August to September 2020. A second season of the manga has been announced. The series' title comes from a 2016 song by the English band Radiohead.

An anime film produced by Studio Colorido premiered in October 2020. A television film adaptation of the prologue chapter, Burn the Witch #0.8, premiered in December 2023.

== Synopsis ==
The story of Burn the Witch takes place in the Bleach universe and follows two witches, Noel Niihashi and Ninny Spangcole, working for the Western Branch of Soul Society, located in Reverse London.

== Characters ==
Ninny Spangcole (ニニー・スパンコール, Ninī Supankōru)
Voiced by: Asami Tano (Japanese); Olivia Hack (English)
Noel Niihashi (新橋 のえる, Niihashi Noeru)
Voiced by: Yuina Yamada (Japanese); Allegra Clark (English)
Macy Baljure (メイシー・バルジャー, Meishī Barujā)
Voiced by: Saori Hayami (Japanese); Brianna Knickerbocker (English)
Balgo Parks (バルゴ・パークス, Barugo Pākusu)
Voiced by: Shimba Tsuchiya (Japanese); Griffin Burns (English)
Bruno Bangnyfe (ブルーノ・バングナイフ, Burūno Bangunaifu)
Voiced by: Chikahiro Kobayashi (Japanese); Sean Chiplock (English)
Billy Banx Jr. (ビリー・バンクス Jr., Birī Bankusu Junia)
Voiced by: Hiroaki Hirata (Japanese); Xander Mobus (English)
Osushi-chan (オスシちゃん)
Voiced by: Rie Hikisaka
Wolfgang Slashhaut (ウルフギャング・スラッシュハウト, Urufugyangu Surasshuhauto)
Voiced by: Mugihito (Japanese); Kyle Hebert (English)
Sullivan Squire (サリバン・スクワイア, Sariban Sukuwaia)
Voiced by: Haruka Shimizu (Japanese); Kira Buckland (English)
Roy B. Dipper (ロイ・B・ディッパー, Roi B Dippā)
Voiced by: Miou Tanaka (Japanese); Zeno Robinson (English)
Shelby (セルビー, Serubī)
Voiced by: Subaru Kimura

== Media ==
=== Manga ===
Written and illustrated by Tite Kubo, Burn the Witch started as a 62-page one-shot published in Shueisha's Weekly Shōnen Jump on July 14, 2018. In March 2020, it was announced that a miniseries would be published in Weekly Shōnen Jump as a companion to the also announced film. Burn the Witch's "first season" is a continuation of the one-shot chapter and ran in Weekly Shōnen Jump for four weeks, from August 24 to September 14, 2020. A "second season" was announced with the release of the first season's final chapter. Shueisha published the series' first season in a 260-page tankōbon volume that included the one-shot chapter on October 2, 2020.

Viz Media published the one-chapter in Weekly Shonen Jump on July 16, 2018. Viz Media simultaneously released the English-language version of the series. In February 2021, Viz Media announced that they would release the first volume of Burn the Witch in English. It was published on October 19, 2021.

No.	Title	Original release date	English release date
1	Don't Judge A Book By Its Cover	October 2, 2020; 978-4-08-882428-4	October 19, 2021; 978-1-9747-2359-1
0.8. "Don't Judge A Book By Its Cover" (one-shot); 01. "Witches Blow A New Pipe"; 02. "Ghillie Suit"; 03. "She Makes Me Special"; 04. "If A Lion Could Speak, We Couldn't Understand"

=== Anime ===
In March 2020, it was announced that the series would receive an anime film adaptation by Studio Colorido, directed by Tatsuro Kawano. The film is distributed by Shochiku and premiered on October 2, 2020, in Japan. The theme song for the film is "Blowing", performed by Nil. The film also streamed in other territories outside Asia, with a different version from the Japanese theatrical release. Crunchyroll streamed the film in a three-episode format on October 1, 2020. Viz Media released the series on home video on October 18, 2022. In Southeast Asia and South Asia, Muse Communication has licensed the film and released it on YouTube.

In September 2023, it was announced that the prologue chapter, "Don't Judge A Book By Its Cover", would receive an anime adaptation. It premiered on TV Tokyo and worldwide on December 30, 2023. (Note: TV Tokyo listed the premiere date on December 29 at 25:00, which is effectively December 30 at 1:00 a.m. JST.) It was streamed by Crunchyroll.

=== Other media ===
In October 2020, the series collaborated with the mobile game Bleach: Brave Souls, featuring Ninny and Noel as playable characters. Brave Souls x Burn the Witch collaboration merchandise was also given out to 150 random people who interacted with the game's Twitter account. A year later, a second round of the collaboration debuted, introducing Bruno Bangnyfe as a new character, with the previous two returning; it was followed by a third round. The series had a crossover event with Oasis' mobile game Bleach: Immortal Soul in May 2022, featuring Ninny and Noel as characters.

== Reception ==
Burn the Witch's first volume sold 86,066 print copies in its first week and 68,810 print copies in its second week.

Skyler Allen of The Fandom Post wrote that despite lacking the same "spark" as Bleach's beginning, the Burn the Witch one-shot is still enjoyable and has plenty of potential for growth in a full serialization, but too much time is spent on its setup to work as a standalone story. He had strong praise for Kubo's art and memorable character designs, but criticized the one-shot as "unfocused" for ideas that did not get properly fleshed out.
