= Anna Nagase =

Japanese voice actress (born 2005)

- 永瀬 アンナ
- Born: March 31, 2005 (age 21); Tokyo, Japan
- Occupation: Voice actress
- Years active: 2020–present
- Agent: 81 Produce
- Known for: Summer Time Rendering as Ushio Kofune; Yurei Deco as Hack; Jujutsu Kaisen as Riko Amanai; Suicide Squad Isekai as Harley Quinn; Akane-banashi as Akane Osaki; Cosmic Princess Kaguya! as Iroha Sakayori; The Ramparts of Ice as Koyuki Hikawa

Anna Nagase (永瀬 アンナ, Nagase Anna; born March 31, 2005) is a Japanese voice actress affiliated with 81 Produce. Some of her notable roles include Ushio Kofune in Summer Time Rendering, Koyuki Hikawa in The Ramparts of Ice, Hack in Yurei Deco, and Iroha Sakayori in Cosmic Princess Kaguya!.

== Biography ==
Nagase was born and raised in Tokyo. She had been performing and acting since she was young, and through her school activities and presentations, she "felt the wonder of acting in front of others." Nagase first began voice acting when she was given the opportunity while studying. She found it to be difficult, which made her want to learn more about the medium. Nagase joined 81 Produce in April 2020 as a junior member. In 2022, she starred in her first lead role as Ushio Kofune in the anime series Summer Time Rendering, for which she learned to speak in the Wakayama dialect. Nagase won the Best New Actor Award at the 17th Seiyu Awards in 2023.

== Filmography ==
=== Television animation ===
2021

- Bakugan: Armored Alliance as Oliver
- Back Arrow as Tom

2022

- Summer Time Rendering as Ushio Kofune
- Yurei Deco as Hack
- Bocchi the Rock! as Interviewer, Customers

2023

- Ippon Again! as Tsumugi Himeno
- My Love Story with Yamada-kun at Lv999 as Tousei High School Students
- Jujutsu Kaisen season 2 as Riko Amanai
- Undead Girl Murder Farce as Louise
- Shy as Inuyama, Heartman Show Children

2024

- Tales of Wedding Rings as Satou (young)
- Bucchigiri?! as Mahoro
- 'Tis Time for "Torture," Princess as Youki
- That Time I Got Reincarnated as a Slime season 3 as Gobwa
- Suicide Squad Isekai as Harley Quinn
- Tasūketsu as Saaya Fujishiro
- Uzumaki as Girl
- Blue Box as Nagisa Funami
- Kinokoinu: Mushroom Pup as Komako Amano

2025

- Zenshu as Natsuko Hirose
- Miru: Paths to My Future as Mario vasco Debritto (young)
- The Brilliant Healer's New Life in the Shadows as Zophia
- Shoshimin: How to Become Ordinary as Satomura
- Onmyo Kaiten Re:Birth Verse as Yura
- Fermat Kitchen as Ayu Uomi
- Milky Subway: The Galactic Limited Express as Makina Kurusu
- Sanda as Ichie Ono

2026

- Hana-Kimi as Rika Yamashina
- The Ramparts of Ice as Koyuki Hikawa
- Fire Force season 3 as Benimaru Shinmon (young)
- Snowball Earth as Otoichi Kinoe
- Akane-banashi as Akane Osaki
- Needy Girl Overdose as Kache
- Marriagetoxin as Kyoko Himekawa
- Liar Game as Shinichi Akiyama (young)
- A Hundred Scenes of Awajima as Mizuki Umemoto
- Mushoku Tensei: Jobless Reincarnation season 3 as Alyssa
- Draw This, Then Die! as Loup Garou
- Reborn as a Space Mercenary: I Woke Up Piloting the Strongest Starship! as Elma
- Psyren as Hiryū Asaga (young)
- Spirit Circle as Kouko Ishigami

2027

- Mercedes and the Waning Moon as Mercedes Grunewald
- LONA as Sango

=== Theatrical animation ===
2026

- Mobile Suit Gundam Hathaway: The Sorcery of Nymph Circe as Julia Suga
- Cosmic Princess Kaguya! as Iroha Sakayori
- Paris ni Saku Étoile as Matilda
- Shiboyugi: Playing Death Games to Put Food on the Table – 44: Cloudy Beach as Essei
- To You in the Beyond as Nanao Aika

=== Original net animation ===
2022

- Cyberpunk: Edgerunners as Boxers, Isabella

2025

- Yu-Gi-Oh! Card Game The Chronicles as Raye
- Takopi's Original Sin as Naoki Azuma

=== Video games ===
2023

- Summer Time Rendering: Another Horizon as Ushio Kofune

2024

- Unicorn Overlord as Mille, Alain (young), Mercenary (Type E)
- Wuthering Waves as Chixia
- Granblue Fantasy as Sato
- Romancing SaGa 2: Revenge of the Seven as Natalie

2025

- Quiz RPG: The World of Mystic Wiz as Etcetera
- Azur Lane as USS Franklin
- Trails in the Sky 1st Chapter as Josette Capua

2026

- Code Vein II as Protagonist
- Brigandine: Abyss as Zodii
- Trails in the Sky 2nd Chapter as Josette Capua

=== Dubbing ===
- Backrooms (Kat (Lukita Maxwell))
- Civil War (Jessie Collin (Cailee Spaeny))
- Heretic (Sister Barnes (Sophie Thatcher))
- Marry Me (Lou (Chloe Coleman))
- Resident Evil
- Spider-Man: Brand New Day (Jean Grey (Sadie Sink))
- Superman (Kara Zor-El / Supergirl (Milly Alcock))
- Supergirl (Kara Zor-El / Supergirl (Milly Alcock))
