= Takopi's Original Sin =

Japanese web manga series

- First tankōbon volume cover, featuring Shizuka Kuze

タコピーの原罪 (Takopī no Genzai)
- Genre: Dystopian; Horror; Science fiction
- Manga
- Written by: Taizan 5
- Published by: Shueisha
- English publisher: NA: Viz Media
- Imprint: Jump Comics+
- Magazine: Shōnen Jump+
- Original run: December 10, 2021 – March 25, 2022
- Volumes: 2
- Original net animation
- Directed by: Shinya Iino
- Produced by: Kei Igarashi (animation); Kotaro Sudo (production)
- Written by: Shinya Iino
- Music by: Yoshiaki Fujisawa
- Studio: Enishiya
- Licensed by: Crunchyroll; SA/SEA: Medialink
- Released: June 28, 2025 – August 2, 2025
- Episodes: 6
- icon

Takopi's Original Sin (Japanese: タコピーの原罪, Hepburn: Takopī no Genzai) is a Japanese web manga series written and illustrated by Taizan 5. It was published on Shueisha's web platform Shōnen Jump+ from December 2021 to March 2022, with its chapters collected in two tankōbon volumes. An original net animation (ONA) adaptation produced by Enishiya was released from June to August 2025. An anime compilation film titled Takopi's Original Sin: Thank You, See You Tomorrow is set to be released theatrically in Japan in November 2026.

== Plot ==
In 2016, Nueinukf, an alien hailing from the Happy Planet, crash-lands on Earth on his mission to spread happiness to others. After evading capture, he comes across Shizuka Kuze, a 9-year-old girl who is bullied at school and only finds solace with her Border Collie, Chappy. Shizuka, noting that he resembles an octopus, names the alien Takopi. Takopi decides to use his planet's Happy Gadgets to help Shizuka, but after seeing her, face scratched and bruised all over as she holds Chappy's leash, Shizuka asks for one of Takopi's gadgets and uses it to take her life. Realizing the gravity of the situation, Takopi uses a Happy Camera to travel back in time, hoping to prevent Shizuka's suicide.

In one of these loops, during a confrontation between Shizuka and her bully Marina Kirarazaka, whose father had an affair with Shizuka's mother, Takopi accidentally hurls the Camera at Marina, breaking it after failing to save Chappy in 101 attempts, killing her and preventing them from reversing time again. Desperate to conceal the crime, Takopi, with the help of Shizuka's classmate, Naoki Azuma, buries Marina's body inside one of his gadgets before assuming her identity. The ruse quickly unravels: Takopi's imitation of Marina is unconvincing, and a group of workers soon stumbles upon the hidden corpse. At the same time, Shizuka exploits Naoki's deteriorating mental state—his spiral into paranoia over hiding the crime, his frantic attempts to save her dog, and the crushing weight of being compared to older brother Junya and condemnation after a poor grade. Ultimately, Takopi tries to reason with Shizuka, preventing her from making any more mistakes, but Shizuka knocks him out with a rock.

An unconscious Takopi recalls his previously erased memories; he initially came to Earth in 2022 to spread joy. The first person he ran into, however, was not Shizuka but Marina, who lived in an abusive household. With Takopi's help, Marina's life begins to improve, and she starts dating Naoki. However, Naoki leaves Marina for Shizuka, who survives her suicide attempt. When Marina's mother learns about the failed relationship, she attacks Marina. Marina kills her mother in self-defense. After Takopi overhears Marina say that she regrets not killing Shizuka in fourth grade, he misunderstands and believes that Marina blames herself. Unable to fix her situation, she commits suicide. This failed timeline leads Takopi to plot killing a 9-year-old Shizuka in the past, which caused the erasure of his memories as a violation of Planet Happy's law, making him forget his original plan upon traveling back in time.

When Takopi returns to where Marina and Shizuka first met, he remembers all the horrible things Marina did to Shizuka, as well as the kindness Shizuka showed him. He realizes that Shizuka was never at fault. Takopi is consoled by Naoki, who thanks him for their friendship and returns to him his Camera. Months later, Takopi finds Shizuka looking for Chappy, and apologizes for initially causing her pain. He reactivates the Camera to rewind to 2016 back when Shizuka met Takopi, which would cost him his life. Afterward, Shizuka and Marina are tearfully reminiscing of Takopi upon noticing Shizuka's sketch of him; Naoki reconciles with Junya and his friends, and Takopi wishes them happiness despite their suffering before disappearing. Six years later in 2022, Shizuka and Marina remain best friends growing up together.

== Characters ==
Takopi (タコピー, Takopī) / Nueinukf (んうえいぬkf)
Voiced by: Kurumi Mamiya (PV, voice comic, anime) (Japanese); Abigail Blythe (English)
A Happian alien from the Happy Planet who resembles an octopus. Takopi's goal is to spread happiness to others through his various gadgets, though his worldview is called into question as he confronts the convoluted nature of human beings. It is revealed later that Takopi had first met a teenage Marina. Marina revealed how she thought that Shizuka was responsible for all her misfortune and wanted her dead, prompting Takopi to go back in time to fulfill Marina's goal. Takopi lost his memories when he was enacting Marina's wish and forgot his objective, leading him to befriend Shizuka instead. After seeing his actions were doing more harm than good, Takopi reset the timeline to give both Shizuka and Marina a better future, which cost him his life.
Shizuka Kuze (久世 しずか, Kuze Shizuka)
Voiced by: Reina Ueda (PV, voice comic, anime) (Japanese); Emily Fajardo (English)
A young girl whom Takopi befriends upon his arrival on Earth. She is the subject of bullying in her school due to her mother's work as a hostess and only finds solace at home with her pet Border Collie Chappy. She commits suicide after Marina had Chappy taken away, only to be saved by Takopi turning back time. After Marina's death, it is revealed that Shizuka has a cold personality and cares only about herself, just like her mother. Shizuka even begins to manipulate Naoki. As time goes on, she slowly starts to unravel as she feels like she is alone. Eventually, she travels to where her biological father is but learns that he has a new family and decides to kidnap his daughters, which Takopi thwarts after seeing his actions did more harm than good. In the original timeline, Shizuka survives her suicide attempt and moves away. Years later, she returns to her hometown and starts dating Naoki. In the new timeline, Shizuka realizes her situation changes little, even if Marina was not in her life, and they end up becoming best friends after subconsciously realizing that they are bonded together through their latent memories of Takopi.
Marina Kirarazaka (雲母坂 まりな, Kirarazaka Marina)
Voiced by: Honoka Kuroki (voice comic), Konomi Kohara (anime) (Japanese); Jill Harris (English)
Shizuka's classmate who is her bully, often mocking her family situation. It is later revealed that Marina is a victim of abuse from her mother, due to her father cheating on her with Shizuka's mother. Marina takes out her anger on Shizuka, to the point of assaulting her, thinking that if Shizuka were gone, her mother would return to her former self. Later, Takopi remembers meeting Marina before the series started, when her fake friends had left her and she was still being abused by her mother. He had decided to kill Shizuka by sending himself back in time, as Marina wanted. However, Takopi lost his memories and forgot his objective. Takopi then accidentally kills Marina with the Happy Camera and ends up taking her place. In the new timeline, Marina realizes her situation changes little, even if Shizuka was not in her life, and they end up becoming best friends as they passively realize that they were bonded together through Takopi.
Naoki Azuma (東 直樹, Azuma Naoki)
Voiced by: Anna Nagase (anime) (Japanese); Ciarán Strange (English)
Shizuka's classmate who tries to support her in any way he can, despite Shizuka repeatedly turning down his help. It is revealed later on that Naoki was being pressured by his mother as she compared him to his older brother Junya who was much more talented than him. Naoki was depressed due to his mother constantly calling him a failure and always expecting him to do just as well as Junya. Naoki eventually learns about Takopi and Marina's death and helps Shizuka by covering it up. Later on, Naoki and Junya reconcile, with Naoki confessing to being involved in Marina's homicide. In the final timeline, Naoki is shown interacting more with his other friends and distancing himself from Shizuka and Marina.

== Production ==
=== Manga production ===
Author Taizan 5 stated that he originally chose to serialize his work on Shōnen Jump+ because he had read works such as Spy × Family. From there, his editor encouraged him to draw whatever he liked, so he decided to draw a slightly darker version of Doraemon. Using family issues as the theme to suit his preferences, he made it a time loop story in order to develop the story. When asked about how he came up with this worldview, which combines the real-world darkness of bullying and family problems with the unrealistic idea of life forms from outer space, Taizan 5 replied in an interview, "I've always liked suspense novels, and I also like children's topics, so I thought it would be interesting to combine the two worldviews." In an interview with Oricon News about the manga, Taizan 5 explained how he dealt with themes like bullying, domestic violence, and abusive parenting. He went on to explain that he chose to depict scenarios where the issue of blame was not clear and could not be laid solely on one individual.

=== Anime production ===
The Takopi's Original Sin anime was produced by the studio Enishiya. It was the first time that the studio has produced an anime TV series. It is a six-episode series written and directed by Shinya Iino. He was responsible in making the anime based on the story of the manga which is emotionally charged and deep.

==== Direction ====
When Iino and producer Kotaro Sudo were making the anime, they emphasized the necessity of maintaining the original themes and the emotional core of the manga during the production. Iino stressed that he strived to present the issues featured in the manga, such as bullying, neglect, and cruelty, without diminishing their impact, as well as to accentuate the animated version of Takopi's expressive personality. The staff tried to balance Takopi's cheerful personality and the difficult stories of the humans' lives, as well as their problems and possibilities to be saved. Sudo stated that the issue of communication is one of the major themes of the adaptation, as well as the fact that there was a warning about the content before the release of the anime.

During a round table discussion at Anime NYC 2025, director and series composition writer Shinya Iino highlighted some of his objectives in the anime adaptation of Takopi's Original Sin. One of his chief objectives was bringing out the charm and expressiveness of Takopi in anime form, in terms of the actions and dialogues which were not as easy to bring out as in the manga form. Another important objective was ensuring that the structure and atmosphere of the original manga was retained along with the story elements and portrayal of the struggles and quest for happiness of the characters.

In his interview, Iino described how the production crew deliberately refrained from imposing any limits to the scripting and storyboard process so that the staff would be free to choose the best method for adaptation of the manga. According to Sudo, although broadcasting on television could have attracted more viewers, the choice of another format enabled the staff to focus on maintaining the integrity of the original work. The ending of the anime was decided based on the reactions to the early episodes, and ended up being different from what was originally planned.

==== Art and animation ====
The framework of the story was decided at the initial meeting. As a result of the limited duration of the anime to six episodes, Iino and his crew managed to allocate a different storyboard artist and an episode director for each of the episodes from the start, and every one of the staff members could devote their attention solely to individual episodes. According to Iino, the limited number of episodes allowed the crew to pay greater attention to the quality of individual episodes. As was stated by the producer, Kotaro Sudo, the same amount of time was allocated for the production of the series as is usually spent on a television anime, albeit with less episodes, making it possible for the team to dedicate more effort to each one.

==== Music ====
Besides taking note of the theme song in the anime, Iino also focused on ensuring that the anime had a suitable soundtrack which would match the mood of Takopi's Original Sin. However, in order to provide contrast against the dark themes in the anime, Iino felt that there should be an upbeat and vibrant portrayal of Takopi through music, especially through use of percussions.

== Media ==
=== Manga ===
Written and illustrated by Taizan 5, Takopi's Original Sin was published on Shueisha's web platform Shōnen Jump+ from December 10, 2021, to March 25, 2022. Shueisha collected its 16 chapters in two tankōbon volumes, released on March 4 and April 4, 2022.

Shueisha's Manga Plus service published chapters of the series in English simultaneously with their Japanese release. In February 2023, Viz Media announced that it licensed the manga for English publication; the series was released as a single volume on November 21 of that same year.

==== Volumes ====
No.	Original release date	Original ISBN	English release date	English ISBN
1	March 4, 2022	978-4-08-883049-0	November 21, 2023	978-1-9747-4034-5
1. "To You in 2016" (2016年のきみへ, Nisenjūroku-nen no Kimi e); 2. "Takopi's Adventure" (タコピーの冒険, Takopi no Bōken); 3. "Marina's Kingdom" (まりなの王国, Marina no Ōkoku); 4. "Takopi's Salvation" (タコピーの救済, Takopī no Kokkai); 5. "Naoki's Intervention" (直樹の介入, Naoki no Kainyū); 6. "Naoki's Adventure" (直樹の冒険, Naoki no Bōken); 7. "Takopi's Confession" (タコピーの告解, Takopī no Kokkai)
2	April 4, 2022	978-4-08-883104-6	November 21, 2023	978-1-9747-4034-5
8. "Shizuka's Kingdom" (静香の王国, Shizuka no Ōkoku); 9. "It's Going to Be All Right" (大丈夫になるよ, Daijōbu ni naru yo); 10. "Naoki's Salvation" (直樹の救済, Naoki no Kyūsai); 11. "Shizuka's Japan Tour" (静香の日本ツアー, Shizuka no Nihon Tsuā); 12. "To You in 2022" (2022年のきみへ, Nisennijūni-nen no Kimi e); 13. "Takopi's Original Sin" (タコピーの原罪, Takopī no Genzai); 14. "Naoki's Intervention" (直樹の介入, Naoki no Kainyū); 15. "Shizuka" (しずか); 16. "To All of You in 2016" (2016年のきみたちへ, Nisenjūroku-nen no Kimi-tachi e)

=== Anime ===
In December 2024, it was announced that the series would receive an anime adaptation. It was later revealed to be an original net animation (ONA) produced by Enishiya, with TBS handling planning and production duties. The six-episode miniseries was directed and written by Shinya Iino, with character designs and chief animation direction handled by Keita Nagahara, and music composed by Yoshiaki Fujisawa. The series was released from June 28 to August 2, 2025, on various streaming platforms, including Netflix, Amazon Prime Video, Abema, and U-Next. (Note: The series premiere was listed as launching on various streaming platforms at 24:00 on June 27, 2025, which is effectively June 28 at midnight JST.) The opening theme song is "Happy Lucky Chappy" (ハッピーラッキーチャッピー), performed by Ano, and the ending theme song is "Glass no Sen" (がらすの線), performed by Tele. Crunchyroll streamed the series outside Asia, with a dub being later produced. Medialink licensed the series in the Asia-Pacific for streaming on Ani-One Asia's YouTube channel.

==== Episodes ====
No.	Title	Directed by (Note: Production staff information is taken from the ending credits of each episode.)	Written by	Animation directed by	Original release date
1	"To You in 2016"; Transliteration: "Nisenjūroku-nen no Kimi e" (Japanese: 2016年のきみへ)	Shinya Iino	Shinya Iino	Keita Nagahara	June 28, 2025
In 2016, Shizuka Kuze encounters an octopus-like alien named Nueinukf, whom she nicknames Takopi. Expressing his mission to spread happiness, Takopi tries to befriend her but is ignored. After seeing Shizuka bloodied, Takopi offers a friendship ribbon despite orders not to give his gadgets away. Shizuka takes the gift and leaves, but Takopi worries when she does not return. He visits her home to find that Shizuka has hanged herself with the ribbon. Realizing that he failed to understand her pain, Takopi uses the Happy Camera to travel back in time and save her. At school, he learns that Shizuka is bullied by Marina Kirarazaka. Takopi disguises himself as Shizuka to make amends, only to face Marina's cruelty firsthand, leaving him frightened. Learning the full extent of the girls' relationship, Takopi rewinds time again to stop a bullying incident between them. This small intervention prompts Shizuka to thank Takopi, saying her life has slightly improved since his arrival, bringing Takopi some comfort. Marina grows angered at Shizuka's change in behavior and returns home, where she is forced to endure her mother's abuse due to her father's affair with Shizuka's mother.
2	"Takopi's Salvation"; Transliteration: "Takopī no Kyūsai" (Japanese: タコピーの救済)	Moaang	Ko Nekota	Moaang	July 5, 2025
Shizuka takes her pet dog Chappy out on a walk with Takopi. Marina suddenly confronts them and attacks Shizuka, causing Chappy to bite Marina back and be taken in by animal control. Realizing the altercation leads to Shizuka's suicide and is unavoidable despite numerous time loops, Takopi alters the outcome to inform a despondent Shizuka that Chappy will be in the care of her divorced father. Takopi urges her to attend school the next day, where she is still bullied by Marina, though Naoki Azuma intervenes on Shizuka's behalf. After school, Marina decides to meet with Shizuka at a forest, causing Takopi to think they will now reconcile. However, Takopi finds Marina ruthlessly beating up Shizuka, blaming her for her family's problems and insisting that Chappy is dead. Unable to handle Shizuka's abuse anymore, Takopi accidentally murders Marina with the Happy Camera. Takopi attempts to turn back time to rectify the mistake, only to discover that the camera no longer works. Shizuka reacts with joy and thanks an unnerved Takopi for killing Marina, calming him. She and Takopi leave Marina's body behind, as Takopi remarks there is no going back.
3	"Takopi's Confession"; Transliteration: "Takopī no Kokkai" (Japanese: タコピーの告解)	Rikka	Shinya Iino	Rikka, Hirotoshi Arai & Tsuyoshi Iida	July 12, 2025
Naoki, worried for Shizuka's wellbeing, encounters her and Takopi before discovering Marina's corpse. Naoki demands that Shizuka turn herself in, but after she guilt trips him and he craves her affection, Naoki helps cover up Marina's murder using one of Takopi's gadgets. The trio bonds over time, with Naoki planning out their trip to Tokyo to visit Chappy. Takopi assists Naoki in stealing the ring of his older brother Junya when Shizuka encourages them, but they fail. Naoki is tearfully reminded of being deprived of affection by his mother, who constantly compares him to the more successful Junya. Takopi is also tasked to mimic Marina at school and at home, allowing him to witness her parents arguing. As Takopi wonders about his original intentions of arriving to Earth, he agrees to join Marina's father to get closer to Shizuka and Naoki's objective. Marina's mother later lashes out and abuses the disguised Takopi for failing to take her side, demanding that the real Marina return. Takopi privately breaks down in tears and voices regret for killing Marina upon reflecting on his actions and experiencing Marina's life, as a group of workers uncover Marina's corpse the next day.
4	"Azuma-kun's Salvation"; Transliteration: "Azuma-kun no Kyūsai" (Japanese: 東くんの救済)	Toya Ooshima	Ko Nekota	Hayate Nakamura	July 19, 2025
With Marina's murder being made public, Naoki panics that he, Takopi, and Shizuka will be discovered by the police. He fast-tracks their trip to Tokyo and gradually breaks down from the stress and hides it from Junya and their mother. Naoki recounts how he felt unloved by his family growing up, which is exacerbated by his failed attempts to protect Shizuka from Marina's bullying. After Shizuka starts giving him attention following their cover-up of Marina's murder, Naoki does everything he can to sustain this remaining affection. Shizuka later tells him to turn himself in to the police, absolving herself from blame and promising she will wait for him. Junya notices Naoki's stress and assures him he will listen to his concerns; Naoki, feeling affection from his family for the first time, cries and confesses his involvement in Marina's murder. The police assume Naoki was coerced, and they connect his involvement with testimonies of Marina's odd behavior in school courtesy of Takopi mimicking her from their classmates, which implicates Shizuka as the culprit. As Takopi suggests they also come clean, Shizuka instead tells Takopi they will be traveling to Tokyo without Naoki.
5	"To You in 2022"; Transliteration: "Nisennijūni-nen no Kimi e" (Japanese: 2022年のきみへ)	Hirotaka Mori	Ko Nekota	Zi Yi Zhuo	July 26, 2025
Takopi and Shizuka arrive in Tokyo, only to discover that her father started a new family and Chappy was never there. Thinking the family ate Chappy, Shizuka resolves to murder them to retrieve his remains. Takopi begs her to stop, but she sees this as betrayal and knocks Takopi unconscious. As Takopi is unconscious, he recalls his forgotten past: in 2022, he befriended a teenage Marina, who suffered severe abuse from her mother. Marina dated Naoki, but his attention shifted towards Shizuka after she reappeared, leaving Marina emotionally isolated. When Naoki did not show up one day, Marina's mother, suspecting their relationship, abused Marina again which prompts her to kill her mother in self-defense. Blaming Shizuka for everything, Takopi decided to kill her, and Marina committed suicide. To fix things, Takopi used the Big Happy Clock of the Happy Planet to travel back in time; the planet's matriarch erased his memories of Marina and exiled him. Regaining consciousness, Takopi is overwhelmed by confusion after remembering Marina's suffering and his past choices. Takopi returns to the spot where he first met Shizuka and Marina, reflecting on morality and the pain they all endured as Naoki stumbles upon him.
6	"To All of You in 2016"; Transliteration: "Nisenjūroku-nen no Kimi-tachi e" (Japanese: 2016年のきみたちへ)	Directed by : Shinya Iino & Masayuki Sakoi; Storyboarded by : Shinya Iino	Shinya Iino	Keita Nagahara, Hirotoshi Arai, Toya Ooshima & Moaang	August 2, 2025
Takopi tells Naoki about Shizuka's suffering, but Naoki cannot help as his family is struggling after his confession. He nevertheless thanks Takopi for giving him and Shizuka moments of happiness and returns the Happy Camera. Several months later, Takopi finds Shizuka still searching for Chappy. Takopi pleads with her to stop and apologizes for not understanding her pain. Shizuka finally breaks down and cries. Comforting her, Takopi decides to use his lifeforce to power the Happy Camera and reset time, granting the children a second chance. Takopi thanks her before he dies. The timeline rewinds to Shizuka's first meeting with Takopi, though Takopi is no longer physically present. Still, faint memories linger as Shizuka and Marina are able to face their trauma and reconcile tearfully after finding a sketch of Takopi. Naoki also feels drawn towards Junya and joins his friends to play games with them. As he fades away, Takopi hopes the trio will grow up to be happy adults despite their difficult childhoods. Six years later, in 2022, Shizuka and Marina are best friends, teasing each other about their dysfunctional families as they shop for stationery. There, they notice a pen set resembling one of Takopi's gadgets.

=== Compilation film ===
In May 2026, it was announced that the anime would receive a compilation film titled Takopi's Original Sin: Thank You, See You Tomorrow (タコピーの原罪 -ありがとう、また明日-, Takopī no Genzai: Arigatō, Mata Ashita). The film is set to be released theatrically in Japan on November 27, 2026. The film will compile the six episodes of the anime with additional scenes. The film's theme song is "Rabyū" (らびゅー; lit. 'Love You'), performed by Tele.

== Reception ==
=== Critical reception ===
==== Manga reception ====
The manga of Takopi's Original Sin received limited critical coverage, though the reviews were generally positive. Jenni Lada of Siliconera commended Takopi's Original Sin for its complex character development and the theme of perspective. This was because the story promoted the notion of a supposed lack of a clear-cut hero or villain. She appreciated the fact that the characters Takopi, Shizuka, and Marina were slowly revealed and understood through their backstories. Another element that earned praise from her included the discussion of the themes of trauma, relationships, and what can happen when one tries to help other people before completely comprehending what they have gone through.

Writing for Anime News Network, Christopher Farris rated the manga four out of five stars. He commended it for its ability to maintain balance between its dark ideas and themes by having a fun premise and dark humor without resorting to exploiting them. However, the review stated that, because of its heavy emphasis on suffering and certain developments in the plot, the work was inconsistent but emotionally powerful. Another writer, who uses the alias "MrAJCosplay", who wrote on the same review, praised Takopi's Original Sin for its strong contrast between its softly-designed characters and its disturbing theme, saying that the way it was drawn added to the intensity of the plot. He enjoyed the story for being very intriguing and touching on themes like human cruelty and psychological trauma as well as how hard it is to help people; he thought that there were some convenient plot devices in the latter part of the story.

==== Anime reception ====
The anime adaptation of Takopi's Original Sin received generally positive reviews. It was praised for its storytelling, direction, animation, and visual presentation. Marko Jovanovic of Anime Corner described the first episode as "gorgeous but devastatingly painful." Melvyn Tan from Anime Trending highlighted the graphics and portrayal of disturbing topics contributed greatly to an unforgettable experience.

A reviewer from Anime News Network, who goes under the name "Bolts", explained that Takopi's Original Sin is an extremely difficult and thought-provoking series due to the intensity with which it deals with the issue of bullying, abuse, neglect, and traumatization. The critic commended the anime for the way it has been directed, the contrast in its visuals and the use of Takopi's views as a device through which to emphasize the difficult life that the human characters are leading, although it is not entirely exploitative since it focuses on the issues of empathy and understanding. The themes of communication and support, as well as the cycle of suffering, were appreciated.

=== Accolades ===
==== Manga accolades ====
Takopi's Original Sin won the Excellence Prize at the 51st Japan Cartoonists Association Awards in 2022. The series ranked third in the 2023 edition of Takarajimasha's Kono Manga ga Sugoi! list of best manga for male readers. The series ranked ninth on "The Best Manga 2023 Kono Manga wo Yome!" ranking by Freestyle magazine. It was nominated for the 16th Manga Taishō in 2023, and ranked 10th out of 11 nominees; it has been nominated for the 27th Tezuka Osamu Cultural Prize in the same year. The manga was nominated for the 54th Seiun Award in the Best Comic category in 2023.

In February 2022, it was reported that the series surpassed the 2 million views per day on the Shōnen Jump+ platform. The first volume sold 41,277 copies in its first week, and the second volume sold 198,505 copies in its first week. By May 2022, the manga had over 1.2 million copies in circulation, including digital versions.

==== Anime accolades ====
Year	Award	Category	Recipient	Result	Ref.
2025	Yahoo! Japan Search Awards	Anime Category	Takopi's Original Sin	4th place	
2025	IGN Awards	Best Anime Series	Takopi's Original Sin	Runner-up	
2025	Abema Anime Trend Awards	Abema Special Award	Takopi's Original Sin	Won	
2026	12th Anime Trending Awards	Anime of the Year	Takopi's Original Sin	Nominated	
2026	12th Anime Trending Awards	Best in Adapted Screenplay	Shinya Iino	Nominated	
2026	12th Anime Trending Awards	Best in Animation	Takopi's Original Sin	Nominated	
2026	12th Anime Trending Awards	Best in Character Design	Keita Nagahara	Nominated	
2026	12th Anime Trending Awards	Best in Episode Directing and Storyboarding	Episode 1: "To You in 2016"	Won	
2026	12th Anime Trending Awards	Best in Sceneries and Visuals	Takopi's Original Sin	Nominated	
2026	12th Anime Trending Awards	Drama Anime of the Year	Takopi's Original Sin	Won	
2026	12th Anime Trending Awards	Mystery or Psychological Anime of the Year	Takopi's Original Sin	Nominated	
2026	12th Anime Trending Awards	Sci-Fi or Mecha Anime of the Year	Takopi's Original Sin	Nominated	
2026	12th Anime Trending Awards	Best Voice Acting Performance – Female	Konomi Kohara as Marina Kirarazaka	Nominated	
2026	10th Crunchyroll Anime Awards	Anime of the Year	Takopi's Original Sin	Nominated	
2026	10th Crunchyroll Anime Awards	Best New Series	Takopi's Original Sin	Nominated	
2026	10th Crunchyroll Anime Awards	Best Drama	Takopi's Original Sin	Nominated	
2026	10th Crunchyroll Anime Awards	Best Animation	Takopi's Original Sin	Nominated	
2026	10th Crunchyroll Anime Awards	Best Character Design	Keita Nagahara	Nominated	
2026	10th Crunchyroll Anime Awards	Best Director	Shinya Iino	Nominated	
2026	10th Crunchyroll Anime Awards	"Must Protect at All Costs" Character	Takopi	Nominated	
2026	Music Awards Japan	Best Original Score for Animation	Yoshiaki Fujisawa	Nominated	
2026	Annecy International Animation Film Festival	Jury Award – TV Series	Takopi's Original Sin	Won	
2026	Japan Expo Awards	Daruma for Best Anime	Takopi's Original Sin	Nominated	
2026	Japan Expo Awards	Daruma for Best Suspense Anime	Takopi's Original Sin	Won	
