= My Oni Girl =

2024 film by Tomotaka Shibayama

- English promotional poster

Japanese name
- Kanji: 好きでも嫌いなあまのじゃく
- Literal meaning: The Demon I Both Love and Hate
Transcriptions
- Revised Hepburn: Suki demo Kirai na Amanojaku
- Directed by: Tomotaka Shibayama
- Written by: Tomotaka Shibayama; Yuko Kakihara
- Produced by: Karen Imagawa
- Starring: Kensho Ono; Miyu Tomita; Shintarō Asanuma; Aya Yamane; Tomoko Shiota; Shirō Saitō; Miou Tanaka; Satsuki Yukino; Shōzō Sasaki; Noriko Hidaka; Satoshi Mikami; Hisako Kyōda
- Edited by: Ryota Kinami
- Music by: Mina Kubota
- Production companies: Studio Colorido; Twin Engine
- Distributed by: Giggly Box; Twin Engine
- Release date: May 24, 2024
- Running time: 112 minutes
- Country: Japan
- Language: Japanese

My Oni Girl (Japanese: 好きでも嫌いなあまのじゃく, Hepburn: Suki demo Kirai na Amanojaku; lit. "The Demon I Both Love and Hate") is a 2024 Japanese animated fantasy film produced by Studio Colorido and Twin Engine. Directed by Tomotaka Shibayama from a screenplay he co-wrote with Yuko Kakihara, the film was released simultaneously in Japanese theaters and on Netflix globally on May 24, 2024. The film stars the voices of Kensho Ono, Miyu Tomita, Shintarō Asanuma, Aya Yamane, Tomoko Shiota, Shirō Saitō, Miou Tanaka, Satsuki Yukino, Shōzō Sasaki, Noriko Hidaka, Satoshi Mikami, and Hisako Kyōda.

== Plot ==
In Yonezawa, Yamagata, Hiiragi Yatsuse, a first-year high school student who cannot refuse requests and seeks acceptance, struggles with his social life and lacks close friends. One unusual summer day, when it snows, he meets Tsumugi, an Oni (demon) girl searching for her mother Shion in the human world. Tsumugi, unlike Hiiragi, is unconcerned with others' opinions and brings him along on her journey.

Shion had disappeared when Tsumugi was very young. Her mother gave her a good luck charm from a remote temple; her last known location was also confirmed by Tsumugi's father Izuru. The kids start their journey at Hiiragi's house, where his suppressed emotions cause snow to fall and attract "snow gods". They escape and hitchhike with Ryuji and Mio Takahashi, a young couple selling used clothing at street fairs. After helping the Takahashis - actually brother and sister - to communicate better about their feelings, they are given clothes for their journey.

Continuing on foot, Hiiragi's emotions - materializing as milky "Mini-Oni" bubbles - again attract snow gods. They escape, but Tsumugi is injured, and Hiiragi carries her to an inn, where she recovers while he helps with various tasks. The inn's staff grows fond of them, but they soon depart.

In a nearby town, Tsumugi investigates an old painted screen depicting a conflict between the snow gods and Oni, meeting an old man named Yoichi Tanimoto who runs a tea shop filled with travel mementos. His daughter and grandson give him purpose after his wife's passing.

They reach the temple and meet Izuru, who reveals that Shion's story was untrue, but he could not tell Tsumugi the real story. Frustrated, Tsumugi argues with Hiiragi, and they part ways. Hiiragi turns into an Oni because of his suppressed emotions, to be then suddenly swept up by a snow god and taken to the Oni village, just as his own father Mikio catches up but watches helplessly.

Hiiragi, inside the snow god, dreams of Tsumugi, causing the snow god to disintegrate and release him. He is welcomed by the Oni. Meanwhile, Tsumugi and Izuru reach the Oni village through a secret tunnel. Despite being in trouble for leaving, Tsumugi finds Hiiragi in the village chief Gozen's throne room. They reconcile, but Tsumugi locks Hiiragi in a pantry, insisting she must complete the final leg of the journey alone.

Realizing Shion is on magical Oni Island, controlling the snow gods with a magical mask, Tsumugi decides to confront her. Izuru frees Hiiragi, who confesses his affection for Tsumugi. He races across the snow to the island, facing the snow gods along the way.

At Oni Island, Tsumugi touches the mask, encountering Shion in a magical space. The mask breaks, allowing her mother to return but potentially unleashing the snow gods and exposing the Oni village. Tsumugi and Hiiragi control the fallout, vanquishing the snow gods, and a more assertive Hiiragi turns human again. The villagers start adapting to the new reality of an Oni village potentially visible, but with much better weather. Tsumugi, Shion, and Izuru are finally reunited, and Hiiragi travels back home.

Hiiragi reconciles with his family and makes friends. Later, Tsumugi comes by bus to visit Hiiragi, who cannot access the Oni village as he is not an Oni anymore and they confess their feelings for one another.

== Voice cast ==
Character	Japanese voice	English voice
Hiiragi Yatsuse	Kensho Ono	Michael Johnston
Tsumugi	Miyu Tomita	Victoria T. Washington
Ryūji Takahashi	Shintarō Asanuma	David Errigo Jr.
Mio Takahashi	Aya Yamane	Jeannie Tirado
Shimako Yamashita	Tomoko Shiota	Cindy Robinson
Naoya Yamashita	Shirō Saitō	Steve Kramer
Mikio Yatsuse	Miou Tanaka	Kiff VandenHeuvel
Mikuri Yatsuse	Satsuki Yukino	Kirsten Day
Yōichi Tanimoto	Shōzō Sasaki	Richard Tatum
Shion	Noriko Hidaka	Anne Yatco
Izuru	Satoshi Mikami	YongYea
Gozen	Hisako Kyōda	Nancy Linari
Kaede Yatsuse	Mitsuho Kambe	Kitana Turnbull

== Production ==
The film was first teased in April 2022 with A Whisker Away co-director Tomotaka Shibayama as director, although the title was not yet unveiled. It is part of a three-film exclusivity deal between Colorido and Netflix that started with Hiroyasu Ishida's Drifting Home, which was released in September 2022.

In March 2024, the film's title and its casting of voice actors Kensho Ono and Miyu Tomita were revealed. Yuko Kakihara is set to serve as the film's scriptwriter, with character designs by Masafumi Yokota and Mina Kubota composing the score. The film's theme song is "Uso Janai," while the insert song is "Blues in the Closet," both performed by Zutomayo.

== Reception ==
=== Critical response ===
On review aggregator website Rotten Tomatoes, the film holds an approval rating of 63% based on 8 reviews, with an average rating of 5.9/10.

Sam Barsanti of IGN gave the film an unfavorable review, writing that "while it is generally nice to look at" and successfully sells its "quiet fantasy" setup, the story ultimately gets dragged down by a "completely flat and unlikable main protagonist." Nilofer Khan for Mashable Middle East also gave it a mixed-to-negative review, describing it as a "mixed bag of fantasy and mediocrity" that boasts impressive animation and a captivating tapestry of supernatural elements, while ultimately falling short due to its "disjointed thematic exploration, sluggish pacing, and lack of originality in relying on borrowed tropes."

On Decider, Brittany Vincent gave it a "Skip It" recommendation, praising its "great" visual and audio design, but heavily criticizing its "grating characters, plodding pace, and sometimes nonsensical story construction" that make for a difficult watch. Isaiah Colbert of Anime News Network praised it as a "disarmingly charming coming-of-age story" with captivating animation and a well-teased central conflict, though he noted that a breakneck-paced final act and a "jumbled lore dump" ultimately complicated its fantastical elements.

Elijah Gonzalez for The A.V. Club gave the film a mixed-to-positive review, praising its "impressive visuals," smooth character animation, and well-defined central character arcs, but ultimately feeling the production was "pleasant, albeit slight" due to a disjointed narrative and poorly outlined stakes.
