= The Ichinose Family's Deadly Sins =

Japanese manga series

- First tankōbon volume cover

一ノ瀬家の大罪 (Ichinose-ke no Taizai)
- Genre: Drama; Suspense
- Manga
- Written by: Taizan 5
- Published by: Shueisha
- English publisher: NA: Viz Media
- Imprint: Jump Comics
- Magazine: Weekly Shōnen Jump
- Original run: November 14, 2022 – November 6, 2023
- Volumes: 6
- icon

The Ichinose Family's Deadly Sins (Japanese: 一ノ瀬家の大罪, Hepburn: Ichinose-ke no Taizai) is a Japanese manga series written and illustrated by Taizan 5. It was serialized in Shueisha's shōnen manga magazine Weekly Shōnen Jump from November 2022 to November 2023.

== Plot ==
The series centers around the titular Ichinose family—Tsubasa, his sister Shiori, their parents Kakeru and Minako, and their grandparents Kozo and Sachie. All six of them wake up in the hospital following a car accident, and all suffer from shock-based amnesia making them unable to remember their lives before the accident. Tsubasa and his family decide to simply return home seeking to learn more about their past selves there, only to find that their family situation is more complicated than they expected.

== Characters ==
Tsubasa Ichinose (一ノ瀬 翼, Ichinose Tsubasa)
Voiced by: Ryōta Ōsaka (2023 PV)
Shiori Ichinose (一ノ瀬 詩織, Ichinose Shiori)
Voiced by: Hiyori Nitta (2023 PV)

== Publication ==
Written and illustrated by Taizan 5, The Ichinose Family's Deadly Sins was serialized in Shueisha's shōnen manga magazine Weekly Shōnen Jump from November 14, 2022, to November 6, 2023. Shueisha collected its chapters in six tankōbon volumes, released from March 3, 2023, to March 4, 2024.

The manga has been published digitally in English by Viz Media and Shueisha's Manga Plus online platform.

=== Volumes ===
No.	Japanese release date	Japanese ISBN
1	March 3, 2023	978-4-08-883437-5
1. "The Ichinose Family Revived" (一ノ瀬家の復活, Ichinose-ke no Fukkatsu); 2. "Tsubasa Returns to School" (翼の登校, Tsubasa no Tōkō); 3. "Tsubasa's Everyday Life" (翼の日常, Tsubasa no Nichijō); 4. "Nakajima's Memories" (中嶋の追憶, Nakajima no Tsuioku); 5. "Tsubasa's Revenge" (翼の復讐, Tsubasa no Fukushū); 6. "Shiori's Encounter" (詩織の遭遇, Shiori no Sōgū); 7. "Tsubasa's Pursuit" (翼の追跡, Tsubasa no Tsuiseki)
2	June 2, 2023	978-4-08-883493-1
8. "Tsubasa's Sprint" (翼の疾走, Tsubasa no Shissō); 9. "Tsubasa's Help" (翼の救済, Tsubasa no Kyūsai); 10. "Kakeru's Disappearance" (翔の消失, Kakeru no Shōshitsu); 11. "Tsubasa's Reunion" (翼の再会, Tsubasa no Saikai); 12. "Kakeru's Unveiling" (翔の発覚, Kakeru no Hakkaku); 13. "Minako's Memories" (美奈子の追憶, Minako no Tsuioku); 14. "Minako's Confession" (美奈子の告白, Minako no Kokuhaku); 15. "Minako's Disappearance" (美奈子の消失, Minako no Shōshitsu); 16. "Kozo's Confession" (耕三の告白, Kōzō no Kokuhaku)
3	August 4, 2023	978-4-08-883588-4
17. "Tsubasa's Reality" (翼の真実, Tsubasa no Shinjitsu); 18. "The Ichinose Family's Reality" (一ノ瀬家の現実, Ichinose-ke no Genjitsu); 19. "Minako's Pursuit" (美奈子の追求, Minako no Tsuikyū); 20. "Kozo's Conscience" (耕三の良心, Kōzō no Ryōshin); 21. "Sachie's Condition" (幸恵の異変, Sachie no Ihen); 22. "Sachie's Plea" (幸恵の願い, Sachie no Negai); 23. "Tsubasa's Good Morning" (翼のおはよう, Tsubasa no Ohayō); 24. "Tsubasa's Revival" (翼の復活, Tsubasa no Fukkatsu); 25. "Tsubasa's Awakening" (翼の覚醒, Tsubasa no Kakusei)
4	October 4, 2023	978-4-08-883660-7
26. "Shiori's Confession" (詩織の告白, Shiori no Kokuhaku); 27. "Tsubasa's Doubts" (翼の疑惑, Tsubasa no Giwaku); 28. "Tsubasa's Confusion" (翼の混乱, Tsubasa no Konran); 29. "Sota's Identity" (颯太の真実, Sōta no Shinjitsu); 30. "Sota's Past" (颯太の記憶, Sōta no Kioku); 31. "Sachie's Past" (幸恵の記憶, Sachie no Kioku); 32. "The Ichinose Family's Collapse" (一ノ瀬家の崩壊, Ichinose-ke no Hōkai); 33. "Sota's Present" (颯太の現在, Sōta no Genzai); 34. "Tsubasa's Encounter" (翼の邂逅, Tsubasa no Kaikō)
5	December 4, 2023	978-4-08-883789-5
35. "Tsubasa's New Life" (翼の生活, Tsubasa no Seikatsu); 36. "Kenta's Truth" (けんたの発覚, Kenta no Hakkaku); 37. "Tsubasa's Conflict" (翼の葛藤, Tsubasa no Kattō); 38. "Kenta's Memories" (けんたの記憶, Kenta no Kioku); 39. "Sota's Recollections" (颯太の追憶, Sōta no Tsuioku); 40. "Sota's Despair" (颯太の失意, Sōta no Shitsui); 41. "The Ichinose Family's Reunion" (一ノ瀬家の再会, Ichinose-ke no Saikai); 42. "Shiori's Memories" (詩織の追憶, Shiori no Tsuioku); 43. "Sota's Plea" (颯太の願い, Sōta no Negai)
6	March 4, 2024	978-4-08-883847-2
44. "Tsubasa's Cry" (翼の叫び, Tsubasa no Sakebi); 45. "Kakeru's Wish" (翔の宿願, Kakeru no Shukugan); 46. "Kakeru's Plea" (翔の願い, Kakeru no Negai); 47. "The Ichinoses' Return" (一ノ瀬家の帰還, Ichinose-ke no Kikan); 48. "The Ichinose Family's Deadly Sins" (一ノ瀬家の大罪, Ichinose-ke no Taizai); "Doujin Seiji" (同人政治, Dōjin Seiji); "Hymn" (讃歌, Sanka)

== Reception ==
The series ranked third in the 2023 Next Manga Award in the print manga category.
