= Hisako Kyōda =

Japanese actress (born 1935)

- 京田 尚子
- Born: February 22, 1935 (age 91); Tokyo Prefecture, Japan
- Education: Aoyama Gakuin Women's Junior College
- Occupations: Actress; voice actress
- Years active: 1945–present
- Agent: Haikyō
- Height: 144 cm (4 ft 9 in)

Hisako Kyōda (京田 尚子, Kyōda Hisako; born February 22, 1935) is a Japanese actress and voice actress. Some of her major voice roles include Genkai in Yu Yu Hakusho, Omusubiman in Soreike! Anpanman and Yukari Godai in Maison Ikkoku. Kyōda is affiliated with the talent agency Haikyō.

== Filmography ==
=== Television animation ===
- Maison Ikkoku (1986) (Yukari Godai)
- Anpanman (1988) (Omusubiman)
- Ranma ½ (1989) (Sentarō's Grandmother)
- Moomin (1990) (The Witch)
- Floral Magician Mary Bell (1992) (Grandma Rose)
- Yu Yu Hakusho (1992) (Genkai)
- Fushigi Yūgi (1995) (Taiitsu-kun)
- Sailor Moon SuperS (1995) (Zirconia)
- Ojarumaru (1998) (Yoshiko Tanaka)
- Vandread (2000) (Magno Vivan)
- Inuyasha (2000) (Kaede)
- Ashita no Nadja (2003) (Anna Petrova / Granny)
- Paranoia Agent (2004) (Old Woman)
- Sgt. Frog (2004) (Akina Hinata)
- Fafner in the Azure (2004) (Ikumi Nishio)
- Tweeny Witches (2004) (Presatio)
- D.Grayman (2006) (Mother)
- Blade of the Immortal (2008) (Yaobikuni)
- Stitch! (2008) (Obaa Kamihara (Grandma))
- Shangri-La (2009) (Nagiko Hojo)
- Hunter × Hunter (2011) (Ging and Mito's Grandmother)
- Natsume Yūjin-chō (2011) (Aokuchinashi)
- Yokai Watch (2014) (Narration)
- Yashahime: Princess Half-Demon (Kaede)

=== OVA ===
- Tenchi Muyo! (1992) (Innkeeper)

=== Theatrical animation ===
- Urusei Yatsura: Only You (1983) (Babara)
- Nausicaä of the Valley of the Wind (1984) (Ōbaba)
- Memories (1995) (Grand Mother)
- Escaflowne (2000) (Old woman)
- Millennium Actress (2001) (Chiyoko's mother)
- Fafner in the Azure: Heaven and Earth (2010) (Ikumi Nishio)
- Shōwa Monogatari (2011) (Yoshi Yamazaki)
- Towa no Quon (2011) (Mayumi Sanada)
- Little Witch Academia (2013) (Old teacher)
- In This Corner of the World (2016) (Ito Morita)
- My Oni Girl (2024) (Gozen)

=== Video games ===
- Kingdom Hearts II (2005) (Fauna)
- Kingdom Hearts Birth by Sleep (2010) (Fairy Godmother, Fauna)
- Kingdom Hearts 3D: Dream Drop Distance (2012) (Laverne)
- Granblue Fantasy (2016) (Rosine)
- Kingdom Hearts III Re Mind (2020) (Fairy Godmother)

=== Tokusatsu ===
- Android Kikaider (1972) (Crimson Jellyfish (ep. 16), Violet Turban shell (ep. 27))
- Ultraman Taro (1973) Piccolo (ep. 46)
- Robot 8-chan (1981) (8-chan (first voice))
- Kikaider 01 (1973) (Ghost Woman (ep. 11), Shadow Rokuro-kubi (ep. 13))
- Himitsu Sentai Gorenger (1975–1976) (Witch Mask (ep. 9), Gon (ep. 32–62))
- J.A.K.Q. Dengekitai (1977) (Devil Amazon (ep. 6), Atomic Witch (ep. 23))
- Spider-Man (1978) (Mons Cat Beast (ep. 8), Witch Monkey (ep. 23))
- Denshi Sentai Denziman (1980–1981) - (Denzi Dog IC)
- Choujuu Sentai Liveman (1988) (Pierrot Zuno (ep. 17))
- Kousoku Sentai Turboranger (1989) (Tameiki Boma (ep. 13))
- Special Rescue Police Winspector (1990) (Vampire Human Face Bat (ep. 29))
- Ninja Sentai Kakuranger (1994) (Kyubi no Kitsune (ep. 40))
- Juukou B-Fighter (1995–1996) (Sorcerer Jagul/Destruction God Jagul (ep. 19–53))

=== Live-action film ===
- Kami no Shima (2025) (voice)

=== Dubbing roles ===
==== Live-action ====
- 10,000 BC (Old Mother (Mona Hammond))
- 101 Dalmatians (2001 TV Asahi edition) (Nanny (Joan Plowright))
- The Addams Family (Grandmama (Judith Malina))
- Addams Family Values (Grandmama (Carol Kane))
- Alice Through the Looking Glass (Mallymkun (Barbara Windsor))
- Anne of Green Gables (Aunt Josephine Barry (Charmion King))
- The Birds (1973 Fuji TV edition) (Lydia Brenner (Jessica Tandy))
- Blue Velvet (Mrs. Pam Williams (Hope Lange))
- Charlie and the Chocolate Factory (Grandma Josephine (Eileen Essell))
- Creepshow 2 (Martha Spruce (Dorothy Lamour))
- The Da Vinci Code (Elegant Woman at Rosslyn (Rita Davies))
- Dog Day Afternoon (1979 Fuji TV edition) (Sonny's mother (Judith Malina))
- Godmothered (Agnes (June Squibb))
- Gunfight at the O.K. Corral (1975 TV Tokyo edition) (Kate Fisher (Jo Van Fleet))
- Harry Potter and the Order of the Phoenix (Arabella Figg (Kathryn Hunter))
- Kindergarten Cop (Miss Schlowski (Linda Hunt))
- Mr. Popper's Penguins (Selma Van Gundy (Angela Lansbury))
- The NeverEnding Story (1987 TV Asahi edition) (Urgl (Patricia Hayes))
- No Good Deed (Mrs. Karen Quarre (Grace Zabriskie))
- The Proposal (Grandma Annie (Betty White))
- Raising Cain (Dr. Lyn Waldheim (Frances Sternhagen))
- She-Wolf of London (Madame Elena (Annabelle Weenick))
- Suspiria (1986 TV Tokyo edition) (Madame Blanc (Joan Bennett))
- The Texas Chainsaw Massacre (Luda Mae Hewitt (Marietta Marich))
- The Texas Chainsaw Massacre: The Beginning (Luda Mae Hewitt (Marietta Marich))
- The Wizard of Oz (1990 DVD edition) (Wicked Witch of the West, Almira Gulch (Margaret Hamilton))

==== Animation ====
- Disney
  - Cinderella (The Fairy Godmother)
    - Cinderella II: Dreams Come True (The Fairy Godmother)
    - Cinderella III: A Twist in Time (The Fairy Godmother)
  - Peter Pan (Tiger Lily, 1963 version)
  - Sleeping Beauty (Fauna)
  - Darkwing Duck (Ammonia Pine)
  - DuckTales (Ma Beagle)
  - House of Mouse (Wicked Witch, The Fairy Godmother, Fauna, Duchess)
  - The Hunchback of Notre Dame II (Laverne)
  - Hercules (Clotho)
  - Lady and the Tramp (Aunt Sarah)
  - The Emperor's New Groove (Yzma)
    - Kronk's New Groove (Yzma)
    - The Emperor's New School (Yzma)
  - Pocahontas (Grandmother Willow)
  - The Great Mouse Detective (Mrs. Judson)
- The Addams Family (Grandmama Addams)
- The Addams Family 2 (Grandmama Addams)
- An American Tail (Gussie)
- Animaniacs (Slappy Squirrel)
- The Bad Guys (Old Woman)
- Despicable Me (Gru's mother)
- Despicable Me 3 (Marlena Gru)
- Minions: The Rise of Gru (Marlena Gru)
- Futurama (Mom)
- The Grinch (Mayor McGerkle)
- James and the Giant Peach (Ladybug)
- Looney Tunes (Granny)
  - Space Jam: A New Legacy (Granny)
- The Lorax (Grammy Norma)
- Popeye (Olive Oyl)
- The Secret Life of Pets 2 (Cat lady)
- Superman/Batman: Apocalypse (Granny Goodness)

== Awards ==
Year	Award	Category	Result
2019	13th Seiyu Awards	Achievement Award	Won
