= The Eccentric Family =

2013 Japanese novel written by Tomihiko Morimi

- First volume cover

有頂天家族 (Uchōten Kazoku)
- Genre: Comedy drama
- Novel series
- Written by: Tomihiko Morimi
- Published by: Gentosha
- Original run: September 25, 2007 – present
- Volumes: 2
- Manga
- Written by: Yu Okada
- Published by: Gentosha
- Magazine: Comic Birz
- Original run: April 30, 2013 – May 29, 2015
- Volumes: 4
- Anime television series
- Directed by: Masayuki Yoshihara
- Produced by: Jun Takei; Kenji Horikawa; Kōtsaku Sakamoto; Masuhiro Kinoshita; Shigeru Saitō; Shūichi Kitada; Tsuyoshi Oda
- Written by: Shōtarō Suga; Ryō Higaki
- Music by: Yoshiaki Fujisawa
- Studio: P.A. Works
- Licensed by: BI: MVM Entertainment; NA: NIS America
- Original network: Tokyo MX, KBS, Sun TV, BS11, Kids Station, KNB
- Original run: July 7, 2013 – September 29, 2013
- Episodes: 13
- Anime television series

The Eccentric Family 2
- Directed by: Masayuki Yoshihara
- Produced by: Terushige Yoshie; Kenji Ebato; Tomo Shioda; Mitsuhito Tsuji; Hirotaka Imagawa; Nobuhiro Takenaka; Tooru Komakine
- Written by: Ryō Higaki; Touko Machida
- Music by: Yoshiaki Fujisawa
- Studio: P.A. Works
- Licensed by: BI: MVM Entertainment; NA: NIS America
- Original network: Tokyo MX, KBS, Sun TV, BS11, Kids Station, KNB
- Original run: April 9, 2017 – June 25, 2017
- Episodes: 12
- icon

The Eccentric Family (Japanese: 有頂天家族, Hepburn: Uchōten Kazoku; lit. 'The Ecstatic Family') is a Japanese novel written by Tomihiko Morimi, originally published by Gentosha in 2007, with a sequel published in 2015. An anime television series adaptation based on the first book aired from July to September 2013. A second season based on the second book aired from April to June 2017.

== Plot ==
In modern-day Kyoto, humans live in the city while tanuki roam the earth and tengu roam the sky. The story surrounds a family of tanuki, the Shimogamo family. They have the ability to transform into anything they wish, from humans to any animate/inanimate object. The third son, Yasaburō, enjoys a bustling daily life. He often visits his teacher Professor Akadama, a tengu. Through Akadama, Yasaburō is acquainted with Benten, a human woman whom Akadama taught to fly like a tengu. As the story unfolds, the members of the Shimogamo family are still dealing with the foggy past that surrounds their father's untimely death prior to the series's start. To complicate matters, Benten is a member of a social group called the Friday Fellows, people who enjoy a meal of tanuki hot pot at the end of the year. The Shimogamo family must balance between living carelessly, maintaining relationships among other tanuki families, and not getting put into a hot pot by the Friday Fellows.

== Characters ==
=== Shimogamo family ===
Yasaburō Shimogamo (下鴨 矢三郎, Shimogamo Yasaburō)
Voiced by: Takahiro Sakurai
The main character and the third Shimogamo son. He is the most carefree among his siblings with a talent for getting himself in trouble.
Yaichirō Shimogamo (下鴨 矢一郎, Shimogamo Yaichirō)
Voiced by: Junichi Suwabe
The first Shimogamo son. He aims to be Nise-emon (偽右衛門, the Trick Magister), the leader of the tanuki society, like his father once was.
Yajirō Shimogamo (下鴨 矢二郎, Shimogamo Yajirō)
Voiced by: Hiroyuki Yoshino
The second Shimogamo son. He transformed himself into a frog for so long that he forgot how to turn back. He now lives in a pond inside a well where he provides advice to others.
Yashirō Shimogamo (下鴨 矢四郎, Shimogamo Yashirō)
Voiced by: Mai Nakahara
The fourth Shimogamo son. He is shy and his tail or ears often pop out when he is frightened. He works at the Electric Wine Factory with Kinkaku and Ginkaku.
Tōsen Shimogamo (下鴨 桃仙, Shimogamo Tōsen)
Voiced by: Kikuko Inoue
The matriarch of the Shimogamo family. She is very protective of her children and does her best to make up for the loss of their father, to the point of usually dressing as a male when not working. Whenever there is a lightning storm, she loses her ability to transform, due to severe astrapophobia.
Sōichirō Shimogamo (下鴨 総一郎, Shimogamo Sōichirō)
Voiced by: Bon Ishihara
The late father of the Shimogamo brothers and the former leader of all of tanuki in Kyoto called Nise-emon. He was eaten by the Friday Fellows years before the story's beginning after falling into a trap set by Benten.

=== Ebisugawa family ===
Sōun Ebisugawa (夷川 早雲, Ebisugawa Sōun)
Voiced by: Nobuo Tobita
Sōichirō's younger brother and uncle of the Shimogamo brothers. He severed relations with the Shimogamo family following Sōichirō's death and aims to replace him as the Nise-emon. Later it is revealed that Sōun was always envious of his brother, as he fell in love with Yasaburō's mother before she married Sōichirō and lost the election for Nise-emon to him. These events led to him betraying Sōichirō by helping Benten capture Sōichirō, leading to Sōichirō's death. His former name was Sōjirō Shimogamo (下鴨 総二郎).
Kinkaku (金閣) and Ginkaku (銀閣)
Voiced by: Shūya Nishiji (Kinkaku), Kosuke Hatakeyama (Ginkaku)
Sōun's twin sons and cousins of the Shimogamo brothers. They like to bully Yashirō and look down on the Shimogamo family. Their real names are Kurejirō (呉二郎) and Kuresaburō (呉三郎).
Kaisei Ebisugawa (夷川 海星, Ebisugawa Kaisei)
Voiced by: Ayane Sakura
Sōun's daughter and Yasaburō's cousin. Kaisei and Yasaburo's fathers had originally planned for them to marry, but the marriage agreement was called off by Sōun after Sōichirō's death. Later it is revealed that Yajirō also had feelings for her. Kaisei hates Benten for being involved in Soun's plan to dispose of her uncle. She also refrains from appearing to Yasaburō in her true form, because it somehow undoes his transformation, a fact she hides from him until her father's death.
Kureichirō Ebisugawa (夷川 呉一郎, Ebisugawa Kureichirō)
Voiced by: Yuichi Nakamura
Sōun's eldest son and the older brother of Kinkaku and Ginkaku. After his father's death, he approaches the Shimogamos and make peace with them.

=== Other characters ===
Benten (弁天)
Voiced by: Mamiko Noto
A young, beautiful, and capricious human woman apparently allied with a dangerous group of humans, the Friday Fellows. She was kidnapped as a child and kept as a ward by Professor Akadama and occupies a unique role in the story as a link between the three worlds of human, tanuki and tengu. Akadama raised her as tengu and taught her tengu magic, giving her powerful magical artifacts that she uses for her own motives. After reaching adulthood, she seemingly spurns Akadama and returns to the human world. Her behavior is driven solely by her own mysterious motivations, and she is used as a pawn as much as she manipulates others. She maintains a relationship with the rebellious younger Yasaburō, who both respects and fears her. Despite seeming to be heartless, she has a lonely and sad side that only a few are privy to, such as Yasaburō and his brother Yajirō. Her real name is Satomi Suzuki (鈴木 聡美, Suzuki Satomi).
Professor Akadama (赤玉先生, Akadama-sensei)
Voiced by: Hideyuki Umezu
An old tengu and the teacher of the Shimogamo brothers. The brothers check up on him from time to time and take care of him, cleaning up his messy apartment and bringing him supplies and liquor. He injured his back in an accident, rendering walking difficult and flying impossible. He spends his days in seclusion and rarely leaves his apartment. He kidnapped Benten when she was younger and raised her, teaching her tengu magic and giving her his most valued treasures. After she grew to womanhood, she chose to leave Akadama's side to follow her own goals. Despite that, Akadama still cares for her and always feels himself lonely when she is not around. His real name is Yakushibō Nyoigatake (如意ヶ嶽 薬師坊, Nyoigatake Yakushibou).
Nidaime (二代目; lit. Junior)
Voiced by: Junji Majima
Professor Akadama's estranged son who returns to Kyoto in the second season. He dresses and behaves as an English gentleman and has a sort of feud with Benten.
Tenmaya (天満屋)
Voiced by: Bin Shimada
A mysterious man with the power of casting illusions who somehow escaped from hell.
Gyokuran Nanzenji (南褝寺 玉瀾, Nanzenji Gyokuran)
Voiced by: Yōko Hikasa
Yaichirō's childhood friend and longtime crush. During the course of the second season, they officially become a couple.
Shōjirō Nanzenji (南褝寺 正二郎, Nanzenji Shōjirō)
Voiced by: Hirofumi Nojima
Gyokuran's older brother, who approves her relationship with Yaichirō.

== Media ==
=== Print ===
The Eccentric Family is written by Tomihiko Morimi, and the first novel was published by Gentosha on September 25, 2007. A sequel titled The Eccentric Family: The Junior Returns (有頂天家族 二代目の帰朝, Uchōten Kazoku: Nidaime no Kichō; lit. "The Ecstatic Family: The Junior Returns") was released on February 26, 2015.

A manga adaptation of the first novel, illustrated by Yu Okada, with character designs by Kōji Kumeta, was serialized in Gentosha's Comic Birz magazine from the June 2013 to May 2015 issues. Gentosha published four tankōbon volumes from September 24, 2013, to June 24, 2015.

=== Anime ===
The first 13-episode season aired in Japan from July 7 to September 23, 2013, on Tokyo MX, KBS, SUN, BS11, Kids Station, and KNB. The director is Masayuki Yoshihara, the scriptwriter is Shōtarō Suga, the music is scored by Yoshiaki Fujisawa, and the animation is done by P.A. Works. Kōji Kumeta provided character designs. The opening theme is titled "Ecstatic Life" (有頂天人生, Uchōten Jinsei) by Milktub. The ending theme is titled "Que Sera, Sera" (ケセラセラ, Keserasera) by Fhána. The anime was released in Japan across seven volumes from August 25, 2013, to March 26, 2017. Crunchyroll streamed the series and NIS America released the series in North America as a premium set including two Blu-ray disc sets on January 5, 2015.

A second season, was greenlit on September 28, 2016. The second season was aired in Japan from April 9 to June 25, 2017, on Tokyo MX, KBS, and KNB and was streamed on Docomo Anime Store in Japan, and Crunchyroll. The main staff and cast members returned for the second season. The opening theme is "Narugamama, Sawagumama" (成るがまま騒ぐまま) by Milktub and the ending theme is "Moon River" (ムーンリバー) by Fhána.

==== Episodes ====
===== Season 1 =====
| No. | Title | Directed by | Written by | Original release date |
|---|---|---|---|---|
| 1 | "Goddess of the Noryoyuka"; Transliteration: "Noryōyuka no Megami" (Japanese: 納涼床の女神) | Fumihiko Suganuma | Shōtarō Suga | July 7, 2013 |
Yasaburō Shimogamo, a young tanuki living in Kyoto, is tasked by Professor Akadama, a tengu and his teacher, to deliver a love letter to his former pupil, a young woman known as Benten. The task that is not easy due to how dangerous Benten can be and the conflicting feelings that Yasaburō has for her.
| 2 | "Mom and Raijin, God of Thunder"; Transliteration: "Haha to Raijin-sama" (Japanese: 母と雷神様) | Hideaki Kurakawa | Shōtarō Suga | July 14, 2013 |
Yasaburō spends the day with the other members of his family as he reminisces about the tragic day when his father Sōichirō was killed and served in a hot-pot party for the Friday Fellows, a secret and feared club who has Benten among their members.
| 3 | "Yakushibou's Inner Parlor"; Transliteration: "Yakushibō no Okuzashiki" (Japanese: 薬師坊の奥座敷) | Jong Heo | Shōtarō Suga | July 21, 2013 |
For an upcoming festival, Yasaburō is tasked by his mother to secure a special artifact for them to hold a family tradition from the days when their father was alive, but upon learning that said item is in Benten's possession, he must ask for her to lend it to him, despite his efforts to avoid her.
| 4 | "The Daimonji Leisure Cruiser Battle"; Transliteration: "Daimonji Nōryōsen Gassen" (Japanese: 大文字納涼船合戦) | Fumihiko Suganuma | Ryō Higaki | July 28, 2013 |
The festival begins, but the happiness of the Shimogamo family is cut short when the members of their rival family, the Ebisugawa family, start a feud with them. Yasaburō realizes that he is in possession of another of Benten's treasures, which he uses to fight back.
| 5 | "The Friday Fellows"; Transliteration: "Kinyō Kurabu" (Japanese: 金曜倶楽部) | Hideki Itō | Shōtarō Suga | August 4, 2013 |
Following the events at the festival, Yasaburō is on the run in fear of Benten's wrath after losing the treasures she had lent him, until he is finally captured by her. Benten decides to spare him after he agrees to help entertain the Friday Fellows in their next meeting.
| 6 | "Taking in Fall Colors"; Transliteration: "Momijigari" (Japanese: 紅葉狩り) | Hideaki Kurakawa | Shōtarō Suga | August 11, 2013 |
After the meeting, Benten takes Yasaburō away and spends some quality time with him. Later he meets his brother Yajirō and learns a side of Benten he never knew before.
| 7 | "Bathhouse Rules"; Transliteration: "Sentō no Okite" (Japanese: 銭湯の掟) | Kenichi Imaizumi | Ryō Higaki | August 18, 2013 |
The election for the next tanuki leader, the Nise-emon is approaching, dividing the tanukis of the city between supporters of Yasaburō's older brother Yaichirō and his uncle, Sōun Ebisugawa. While taking a bath with Professor Akadama, Yasaburō and Yaichirō learn a shocking secret regarding their brother Yajirō and the day their father died.
| 8 | "The Day of Dad's Departure"; Transliteration: "Chichi no Tatsu Hi" (Japanese: 父の発つ日) | Fumihiko Suganuma | Ryō Higaki | August 25, 2013 |
Yaichirō confronts Yajirō regarding his involvement in Sōichirō's death and learns from him about what happened between them during the last time Yajirō and Sōichirō met.
| 9 | "Kaisei, Daughter of Ebisugawa"; Transliteration: "Ebisugawa no Musume Kaisei" (Japanese: 夷川の娘・海星) | Jong Heo | Shōtarō Suga | September 1, 2013 |
As the tanuki make preparations for the next Nise-emon election, Yasaburō has a short meeting with Kaisei, his former fiancée and becomes intrigued when she apologizes to him for apparently no reason.
| 10 | "The Strings Pulled by Ebisugawa Soun"; Transliteration: "Ebisugawa Sōun no Anyaku" (Japanese: 夷川早雲の暗躍) | Takeyuki Sadohara | Ryō Higaki | September 8, 2013 |
The Nise-emon election is at hand, but so is the dreaded day when one tanuki will be hunt down by the Friday Fellows for their traditional hot pot party. Yasaburō finally learns the reason of Kaisei's apology when she reveals that her father is the culprit behind Sōichirō's demise. However, a greater danger arises when he finds out that Sōun now intends to dispose of the rest of the Shimogamo family.
| 11 | "Back in the Game"; Transliteration: "Kendochōrai" (Japanese: 捲土重来) | Hideaki Kurakawa | Shōtarō Suga | September 15, 2013 |
After Yasaburō gets a help from Benten to escape Sōun and his elite guard, the Ebisugawa family manages to nab him anyway through a clever plot by Kinkaku and Ginkaku. Meanwhile, Kaisei helps Yashirō escape the Electric Brandy factory and Yaichirō is handed over to the Friday Fellows as the primary ingredient for their end of the year hot pot.
| 12 | "The False Eizan Electric Railway"; Transliteration: "Nise Eizan Densha" (Japanese: 偽叡山電車) | Jong Heo | Ryō Higaki | September 22, 2013 |
Yashirō comes up with a plan to get Yajirō's involvement, leading to the trouncing of Kinkaku and Ginkaku. Yashirō stalls the Nise-emon decision meeting while Yasaburō saves Yaichirō, but their mother is still in danger of becoming Friday Fellows's hot pot meal.
| 13 | "The Ecstatic Family"; Transliteration: "Uchōten Kazoku" (Japanese: 有頂天家族) | Fumihiko Suganuma | Shōtarō Suga | September 29, 2013 |
Tanuki and human worlds collide as both the Nise-emon ceremony and Friday Fellows's bash descend into chaos. The scale of the disturbance increases when Akadama starts brandishing the Fujin Raijin folding fan, but by New Year's everything settles down and the Shimogamo family is able to calmly consider their hopes for the future.

===== Season 2 =====
| No. overall | No. in season | Title | Directed by | Written by | Original release date |
|---|---|---|---|---|---|
| 14 | 1 | "The Nidaime's Homecoming"; Transliteration: "Nidaime no Kichō" (Japanese: 二代目の帰朝) | Yasuo Fujii | Ryō Higaki | April 9, 2017 |
Upon hearing that Nidaime, Professor Akadama's estranged son has returned, Yasaburō tries his best to prevent them from clashing with no success.
| 15 | 2 | "The Conjurer Tenmaya"; Transliteration: "Genjutsu-shi Tenmaya" (Japanese: 幻術師 天満屋) | Fumihiko Suganuma | Ryō Higaki | April 16, 2017 |
Yasaburō confronts the mysterious Tenmaya who defeats him with his illusions, and decides to investigate his past, looking for a way to get back at him.
| 16 | 3 | "The Scent of Europe"; Transliteration: "Yōroppa no Kaori" (Japanese: 欧羅巴の香り) | Yuriko Abe | Ryō Higaki | April 23, 2017 |
Yasaburō's second clash with Tenmaya is interrupted by Benten, who has just returned from her trip to Europe. After helping her with her luggage, Yasaburō goes with his mother to pay a visit to his grandmother, who provides them with a medicine to bring Yajiro back to normal.
| 17 | 4 | "The Tanuki Shogi Tournament"; Transliteration: "Tanuki Shōgi Taikai" (Japanese: 狸将棋大会) | Jong Heo | Touko Machida | April 30, 2017 |
The Tanuki Shogi tournament organized by Yaichiro is ruined when Yasaburō has an argument with Ginkaku and Kinkaku. After that, Yasaburō is tasked by his mother to find a way to have Yaichiro mend his relationship with his longtime crush Gyokuran.
| 18 | 5 | "The Daimonji Leisure Cruiser Battle Continued"; Transliteration: "Zoku Daimonji Nōryōsen Gassen" (Japanese: 続・大文字納涼船合戦) | Yasuo Fujii | Touko Machida | May 7, 2017 |
The time for the festival comes again, and without a ship to rent, the Shimogamo family comes with an improvised solution to enjoy the occasion, this time with Gyokuran and Benten tagging along as well. However, Ginkaku and Kinkaku appear to take back at Shimogamos for what happened in last year's festival, but their confrontation is interrupted by the sudden arrival of Nidaime, who is challenged by Benten.
| 19 | 6 | "Arima Hell"; Transliteration: "Arima Jigoku" (Japanese: 有馬地獄) | Fumihiko Suganuma | Ryō Higaki | May 14, 2017 |
Yasaburō sets for Arima to spy at the Friday Fellows and discovers that Sōun intends to join their side. Thrown into hell by Sōun, Yasaburō transforms himself into a oni to avoid being pursued by them, and finds his chance to escape upon meeting Benten.
| 20 | 7 | "The Friday Fellows Once More"; Transliteration: "Kinyō Kurabu, Futatabi" (Japanese: 金曜倶楽部、再び) | Yuriko Abe | Ryō Higaki | May 21, 2017 |
Back from hell with Benten's help, Yasaburō is invited by her to attend another meeting of the Friday Fellows, where by an unexpected turn of events, he is invited to join them instead of Sōun, bringing up his uncle's fury with tragic consequences.
| 21 | 8 | "Ebisugawa Kaisei's Secret"; Transliteration: "Ebisugawa Kaisei no Himitsu" (Japanese: 夷川海星の秘密) | Jong Heo | Ryō Higaki | May 28, 2017 |
Following Sōun's death, the Shimogamos and the Ebisugawas decide to finally put an end on their feud. Some time later, Yaichirō and Yajirō decide to reinstate Yasaburō's engagement with Kaisei but he refuses. While secluding himself on the forest, Yasaburō is approached by Kaisei, who reveals the reason why she can't marry him, and why she never appears in her true form to him.
| 22 | 9 | "The Various Nidaime"; Transliteration: "Sorezore no Nidaime" (Japanese: それぞれの二代目) | Jong Heo; Yuriko Abe | Touko Machida | June 4, 2017 |
After Yajiro departs to travel around, the time has come to choose the next Nise-emon. However, Professor Akadama refuses to be the election's overseer and appoints Benten to the position. With Benten being a member of the Friday Fellows, the Tanuki dislike the idea, and Yasaburō decides to look for Nidaime's help.
| 23 | 10 | "The Day the Nise-emon Is Chosen"; Transliteration: "Nise-emon no Kimaru Hi" (Japanese: 偽右衛門の決まる日) | Fumihiko Suganuma | Ryō Higaki | June 11, 2017 |
After earning the wrath of Benten, Yasaburō runs away for his own safety. Some time later, the time comes for Yaichirō to be chosen as the new Nise-emon, while Tenmaya captures Yasaburō and Kaisei for the Friday Fellows' year-end banquet.
| 24 | 11 | "Tengu Blood, Idiot Blood"; Transliteration: "Tengu no Chi Aho no Chi" (Japanese: 天狗の血 阿呆の血) | Yasuo Fujii; Fumihiko Suganuma | Ryō Higaki | June 18, 2017 |
The Shimogamo family is incriminated for Sōun's death while Yasaburō's friends set out to rescue him and Kaisei. Meanwhile, Yajiro returns from his trip, bringing back Sōun's eldest son who reveals not only that Sōun was not dead at all, but was impersonating him in another ploy to usurp the position of Nise-emon and get his revenge on the Shimogamos.
| 25 | 12 | "The Red String of Fate"; Transliteration: "Unmei no Akai Ito" (Japanese: 運命の赤い糸) | Yuriko Abe; Fumihiko Suganuma | Ryō Higaki | June 25, 2017 |
Once again, the tanukis and the Friday Fellows collide thanks to Yasaburō's meddling, and after a heated confrontation with Benten, Nidaime mends his relationship with his father, while Tenmaya is dragged back to hell with Sōun in tow. New Year arrives, and while Yaichirō and Gyokuran have their marriage, Yasaburō and Kaisei assume their mutual feelings and reinstate their engagement.
