= Taizan 5 =

Japanese manga artist

Taizan 5 タイザン5
- Area: Manga artist
- Notable works: Takopi's Original Sin; The Ichinose Family's Deadly Sins
- Awards: 51st Japan Cartoonists Association Award Manga Kingdom Tottori prize (Takopi's Original Sin, 2022)

Taizan 5 (タイザン5, Taizan Faibu) is a Japanese manga artist. He began his career by releasing a one-shot manga Sanka in 2020. He is the author of Takopi's Original Sin and The Ichinose Family's Deadly Sins and won the 51st Japan Cartoonists Association Award Manga Kingdom Tottori prize for Takopi's Original Sin in 2022.

== Background ==
On September 22, 2020, he posted a one-shot Sanka (讃歌) on the web comic posting site Jump Rookie! by Shueisha, and he received the Editor's Expectations Award in September 2020.

In October of the same year, he posted a one-shot Doujin Seiji (同人政治) in Weekly Young Jump by the same publisher for the 100 Million Yen 40th Manga Award contest, and he received the award for an honorable mention with the political division.

Takopi's Original Sin was serialized in Shōnen Jump+ by the same publisher from December 10, 2021, to March 25, 2022, and its his debut serialization. The same work had more than 200 million views on the first day of release on its site, and it became a topic.

In 2022, Takopi's Original Sin won the 51st Japan Cartoonist Association Award Manga Kingdom Tottori prize. In September of the same year, the Taizan 5 Manga Award was created, and he served as a special committee member. In November of that year, The Ichinose Family's Deadly Sins, another manga series he authored, began serialization in Weekly Shōnen Jump's 50th issue.

== Person ==
Until he received an award from Jump Rookie!, he was asked questions about the kinds of manga he studied, and when he was asked if possible what films he saw, he rewatched his favorite films, such as Trainspotting and The Two Popes.

== List of works ==
=== Serializations ===
- Takopi's Original Sin (Shōnen Jump+, December 10, 2021 – March 25, 2022). Won the 51st Japan Cartoonists Association Award Manga Kingdom Tottori prize.
- The Ichinose Family's Deadly Sins (Weekly Shōnen Jump, 2022 Issue 50 – 2023 Issue 49)

=== One-shots ===
- Sanka (Jump Rookie! September 22, 2020) – Received Editor's Expectations Award in September 2020 and included in volume 6 of The Ichinose Family's Deadly Sins.
- Doujin Seiji (Tonari no Young Jump (となりのヤングジャンプ), October 15, 2020) – Winner of the honorable mention with the political division in the 100 Million Yen 40th Manga Award and included in volume 6 of The Ichinose Family's Deadly Sins.
- Hero Complex (Shōnen Jump+, February 12, 2021)
- The Man Who Wants a Kiss (Shōnen Jump+, July 17, 2021) – Printed in Koi: Love Anthology (読切集『恋』, Yomikiri Shū "Koi").
- Hanareta Futari (Shōnen Jump+, July 26, 2024) – A sports manga produced for Yoasobi's musical production.
- Fighting Girls (Shōnen Jump+, August 18, 2025) – Work in Shōnen Jump+ Natsu no Tokubetsu Yomikiri 11 Rendan (少年ジャンプ＋夏の特別読切11連弾).

=== Books ===
- Takopi's Original Sin, Shueisha (Jump Comics) 2022, both volumes
- The Ichinose Family's Deadly Sins, Shueisha (Jump Comics) 2023–2024, all six volumes
