= Tomihiko Morimi =

Japanese writer from Nara Prefecture (born 1979)

- 森見 登美彦
- Born: January 6, 1979 (age 47); Ikoma, Nara, Japan
- Education: Kyoto University
- Occupation: Novelist
- Writing career
- Language: Japanese
- Genres: Science fiction, Fantasy

Tomihiko Morimi (Japanese: 森見 登美彦, Hepburn: Morimi Tomihiko; born January 6, 1979) is a Japanese writer from Ikoma in the Nara Prefecture. He graduated from Kyoto University and his works often have Kyoto as the setting. Multiple of his works have been adapted to film, TV series, stage plays, and radio dramas.

In July 2018, it was announced that the first two of Morimi's original works to be published in English will be Penguin Highway and The Night Is Short, Walk On Girl, both published by Yen Press in 2019.

In 2022, Tower of the Sun and Fox Tales were published in English by Yen Press, while The Tatami Galaxy was published by HarperCollins, who also published The Tatami Time Machine Blues in 2023.

== Partial bibliography ==
- Tower of the Sun (太陽の塔, Taiyō no Tō) (2003)
- The Tatami Galaxy (四畳半神話大系, Yojōhan Shinwa Taikei; lit. "4½ Tatami Mythological Chronicles") (2004)
- Fox Tales (きつねのはなし, Kitsune no Hanashi) (2006)
- The Night Is Short, Walk On Girl (夜は短し歩けよ乙女, Yoru wa Mijikashi Aruke yo Otome) (2006)
- [New Interpretation] Run, Melos! and Four Other Stories (【新釈】走れメロス、他四篇, [Shinshaku] Hashire Merosu, Ta Shi Hen) (2007)
- The Eccentric Family (有頂天家族, Uchōten Kazoku; lit. "The Ecstatic Family") (2007)
- Love Letter Techniques (恋文の技術, Koibumi no Gijutsu) (2010)
- Yoiyama Kaleidoscope (宵山万華鏡, Yoiyama Mangekyō) (2010)
- Penguin Highway (ペンギン・ハイウェイ, Pengin Haiwei) (2010) Nihon SF Taisho Award winner.
- The Adventures of a Saintly Slacker (聖なる怠け者の冒険, Seinaru Namakemono no Bōken) (2013)
- The Eccentric Family: The Junior Returns (有頂天家族 二代目の帰朝, Uchōten Kazoku: Nidaime no Kichō; lit. "The Ecstatic Family: The Junior Returns") (2015)
- Night Train (夜行, Yakō) (2016)
- Tropics (熱帯, Nettai) (2016)
- The Tatami Time Machine Blues (四畳半タイムマシンブルース, Yojōhan Taimu Mashin Burūsu; lit. "4½ Tatami Time Machine Blues") (2020)
- The Triumphant Return of Sherlock Holmes (シャーロック・ホームズの凱旋, Shārokku Hōmuzu no Gaisen) (2024)
- Treasure Island (宝島, Takarajima) (2025)
