= Drifting Home =

2022 film directed by Hiroyasu Ishida

- English promotional poster

Japanese name
- Kanji: 雨を告げる漂流団地
Transcriptions
- Revised Hepburn: Ame o Tsugeru Hyōryū Danchi
- Directed by: Hiroyasu Ishida
- Written by: Hiroyasu Ishida; Hayashi Mori
- Produced by: Koji Yamamoto
- Starring: Mutsumi Tamura; Asami Seto; Ayumu Murase; Daiki Yamashita; Yumiko Kobayashi; Inori Minase; Kana Hanazawa
- Cinematography: Kei Machida
- Edited by: Ryota Kinami
- Music by: Umitarō Abe
- Production company: Studio Colorido
- Distributed by: Netflix
- Release date: September 16, 2022
- Running time: 119 minutes
- Country: Japan
- Language: Japanese

Drifting Home (Japanese: 雨を告げる漂流団地, Hepburn: Ame o Tsugeru Hyōryū Danchi; lit. 'Drifting Apartment that Announces Rain') is a 2022 Japanese animated coming-of-age fantasy adventure comedy-drama film directed by Hiroyasu Ishida from a screenplay he co-wrote with Hayashi Mori and Minaka Sakamoto. Produced by Studio Colorido, the film was released simultaneously in Japanese theaters and on Netflix on September 16, 2022.

== Plot ==
Kosuke Kumagaya and Natsume Tonai are 11-year-olds who grew up like siblings. The relationship between the two began to be strained after the death of Kosuke's grandfather, Yasuji Kumagaya.

One day during summer vacation, Kosuke and his classmates of Kamo Elementary School, named Taishi, Yuzuru, Reina, and Juri, sneak into the Kamonomiya apartment complex, known by the kids as the "ghost housing complex", that has been slated for demolition. This housing complex happens to be a house full of memories where Kosuke and Natsume grew up, alongside grandfather Yasuji.

There, Kosuke unexpectedly encounters Natsume, who tells him and the others about the existence of a mysterious boy named Noppo living in the complex. Kosuke and Natsume start to argue, the group later chips in, then heavy rain ensues. After the rain stops, the housing complex is suddenly drifting in the middle of the ocean.

With no one in the building except them, the kids attempt to survive on their own, by exploring other nearby buildings also floating in the ocean, on the search for food. During their time together, tension in the group rises, as injuries and arguments happen.

After their building crashes into another, a hole is made at the bottom, and water starts to flow inside. The group must leave the building and go out in the ocean. Using objects they find in the apartment, they build a raft.

Everyone boards the raft except Noppo, who pushes the boat away from the apartment where he decides to stay, to the group's surprise. Natsume refuses to leave him behind, and swims back to the building. Kosuke follows her into the water, but fails to catch up to her and the building.

The group is separated: Noppo and Natsume are on the roof of the apartment complex, whereas the rest are in the raft. Later, the raft is approached by a floating Ferris wheel. The kids use this huge wheel to reel in the building Noppo and Natsume are on, with the help of a mysterious women who appears from this Ferris wheel.

The group reunites on the initial building, and reaches a mysterious shore, where they see other kids waving at them. The group thinks of getting off the building and onto the shore, but Noppo stops them and leaves alone, saying they won't be able to return home if they leave with him. The group lets him go, and are somehow led back home, by a mysterious way only Noppo seems to know. They return to their normal lives, and Kosuke and Natsume find themselves closer than ever.

== Characters ==
=== Kosuke Kumagaya (熊谷 航祐, Kumagaya Kōsuke) ===
One of the two protagonists. Eleven-year-old boy, whose grandfather passed away.

=== Natsume Tonai (兎内 夏芽, Tonai Natsume) ===
The other of the two protagonists. Eleven-year-old girl, who used to live with Kosuke and his grandfather at the Kamonomiya apartment complex.

=== Noppo (のっぽ) ===
Mysterious boy who lives at the apartment complex.

=== Taishi Koiwai (小祝 太志, Koiwai Taishi) ===
Kosuke and Natsume's classmate at Kamo Elementary School. He is a member of the football club.

=== Yuzuru Tachibana (橘 譲, Tachibana Yuzuru) ===
Another classmate. He is also a member of the football club.

=== Reina Haba (羽馬 令依菜, Haba Reina) ===
Another classmate, who has an interest in Kosuke all throughout the story.

=== Juri Ando (安藤 珠理, Andō Juri) ===
Another classmate. She is Reina's best friend.

=== Satoko Tonai (兎内 里子, Tonai Satoko) ===
Natsume's mother, who did not have a stable relationship with Natsume's father.

=== Yasuji Kumagaya (熊谷 安次, Kumagaya Yasuji) ===
Kosuke's grandfather, who lived at the Kamonomiya apartment complex, with Kosuke and Natsume. The film begins after his death.

== Voice cast ==
Character	Japanese voice	English voice
Kosuke Kumagaya (熊谷 航祐, Kumagaya Kōsuke)	Mutsumi Tamura	Bryce Papenbrook
Natsume Tonai (兎内 夏芽, Tonai Natsume)	Asami Seto	Cassandra Lee Morris
Noppo (のっぽ)	Ayumu Murase	Elliot Fletcher
Taishi Koiwai (小祝 太志, Koiwai Taishi)	Yumiko Kobayashi	Alex Cazares
Yuzuru Tachibana (橘 譲, Tachibana Yuzuru)	Daiki Yamashita	Benjamin Diskin
Reina Haba (羽馬 令依菜, Haba Reina)	Inori Minase	Abby Trott
Juri Ando (安藤 珠理, Andō Juri)	Kana Hanazawa	Cherami Leigh
Satoko Tonai (兎内 里子, Tonai Satoko)	Nana Mizuki	Cherami Leigh
Yasuji Kumagaya (熊谷 安次, Kumagaya Yasuji)	Bin Shimada	John DiMaggio
Ferris Wheel Spirit	Aya Endō	Kari Wahlgren
Yasuko Kumagaya	Rikako Aikawa	Kari Wahlgren
Girl Students	Haruna Mikawa	Kate Higgins

== Production and release ==
The film was first announced by Netflix in September 2021. It was announced to be produced by Studio Colorido and directed by Hiroyasu Ishida, with scripts by Ishida, as well as Hayashi Mori and Minaka Sakamoto. Akihiro Nagae designed the characters and Umitarō Abe composed the music. Zutomayo performed the film's theme song, "Blush" (消えてしまいそうです, Kiete Shimaisō Desu; lit. 'It Seems It'll Accidentally Disappear'), as well as the insert song "Summer Slack" (夏枯れ, Natsugare; lit. 'Summer Slump'). The film was released on September 16, 2022, on Netflix and in Japanese theaters.

== Reception ==
=== Critical response ===
On the review aggregator website Rotten Tomatoes, 69% of 16 critics' reviews are positive, with an average rating of 6.9/10.

Simon Abrams of RogerEbert.com gave the film an unfavorable review, writing that what it achieves through a "straight-forward disaster movie" focus and "great, lived-in details" in its production design, it ultimately undermines with a "stunted" narrative design, "stillborn conversations," and an inability to fully realize its emotional "untapped potential." Maya Phillips of The New York Times gave it a negative review, noting that while it delivers a "great visual concept" with its ghostly drifting structures, it ultimately "feels utterly lost at sea" due to a lack of coherent fantastical logic, lagging pacing, and an unattended narrative that fails to flesh out its central emotional battleground.

Writing for MovieWeb, Ashley Hajimirsadeghi offered a mixed-to-positive review, calling the film "heartwarming" and visually impressive but uneven in its pacing and "stiff" in its English dub. Kenneth Seward Jr. of IGN gave it a more favorable review, writing, "besides a few mishaps story wise, Drifting Home proves to be a good film" that serves as an "inventive story that happens to be relatable on multiple levels" through its exploration of grief and excellent 2D animation. Kambole Campbell of Polygon also gave the film a positive review, praising its animation, emotional depth, and "sensitive" character work despite "occasional repetitive tensions."

On Decider, Brittany Vincent gave the film a "Skip It" recommendation, criticizing its "drab" atmosphere, predictable twists, and a "snail's pace" that stretches out the coming-of-age narrative, though she found that the voice cast does a "great job" trying to establish relationships between characters that never quite feel worth backing. Ali Griffiths of Digital Spy reported that it was a "surprisingly thoughtful adventure" with a "nostalgic tone," praising its "deceptively simple animation style" and its clever exploration of coming-of-age themes, though he noted that a confusing final act left its central mystery "frustratingly vague."

Sam Haysom of Mashable gave it a mixed-to-positive review, praising it as a "strange fantasy journey" that is "memorably beautiful" due to its stunning cinematography and poignant moments about emotional survival, though he noted that the story "feels a little drawn-out at times" and some characters remain less developed than others.

Robbie Collin of The Daily Telegraph said the film was a "strange and beautiful" experience that is "constantly thrilling," praising its "raucous energy" and how it grounds a "flight of madcap fantasy" with the believable emotional stakes of its childlike characters. Liam Maguren of Flicks.co.nz gave it a positive review, writing that what initially looked like "a wild idea in search of a story" ultimately reveals itself to be a "very touching take on the haunted house genre," praising its "brash and wholly unique slab of oceanic action" and gentle empathy towards children, even if it lacks subtlety and leaves characters to "explode with their feelings and say exactly what's on their minds."

=== In Japanese theaters ===
The film was released simultaneously on Netflix and in Japanese theaters. The lack of articles addressing successful box office figures may mean that there was larger success on Netflix than in in-person theaters, potentially due to the same release date and higher accessibility of the online platform.
