= List of Space Dandy episodes =

Space Dandy is an anime television series produced by Bones. The series is directed by Shingo Natsume, with Shinichirō Watanabe serving as general director. The series follows the misadventures of Dandy, an alien hunter who is "a dandy guy in space", in search for undiscovered and rare aliens with his robot assistant QT and his feline-like friend named Meow.

The anime began airing on Adult Swim's Toonami programming block in North America on January 4, 2014, one day before its Japanese premiere on Tokyo MX on January 5, 2014. The anime has been licensed by Funimation in North America, Madman Entertainment in Australia, and Anime Limited in the United Kingdom. In Japan, the series was collected in both DVD and Blu-ray format starting on April 25, 2014.

The series' opening theme is "Viva Namida" (ビバナミダ, Biba Namida; "Viva Tears") performed by Yasuyuki Okamura and the ending theme up through episode 19 is "X-Jigen e Yōkoso" (X次元へようこそ, Ekkusu Jigen e Yōkoso; "Welcome to the Xth Dimension") performed by Etsuko Yakushimaru. Starting with episode 20, unique ending themes are used each week. Episode 20's ending theme is "Kanchigai Lonely Night" (かんちがいロンリーナイト, Kanchigai Ronrī Naito; "Misunderstood Lonely Night") performed by DROPKIX (vocals by Junichi Suwabe). Episode 21 used "WHITE HOUSE" composed and arranged by Ogre You Asshole. Episode 22 featured "Space Dandy" (スペース☆ダンディ, Supēsu Dandi) performed by ZEN-LA-ROCK featuring Yomeiri Land. Episode 23 featured "Seaside Driving" composed and arranged by Seiichi Nagai of Sōtaisei Riron.

The English version was produced by Funimation in Fort Worth, Texas using its local acting talent pool. The series' ADR voice directors include Zach Bolton and Joel McDonald. The series was also simulcasted at the same time as Japan by Animax Asia in South East Asia with both Japanese and English audio.

== Episode list ==
=== Season 1 (2014) ===
No. overall	No. in season	Title	Directed and storyboarded by	Written by	Animation directed by	Japanese release date	English release date
1	1	"Live with the Flow, Baby"; Transliteration: "Nagare Nagasarete Ikiru Jan yo" (Japanese: 流れ流されて生きるじゃんよ)	Shingo Natsume	Shinichirō Watanabe	Yoshiyuki Ito	January 5, 2014	January 4, 2014
Alien hunter Dandy and his robot companion QT search the galaxies for rare alien species while aboard their spaceship, the Aloha Oe. They travel to a local breastaurant named BooBies, where they eventually find a Betelgeusean, later recognized as Meow. However, Dandy mistakes Meow for a new species after tussling with him. Meow boards the Aloha Oe and tells Dandy and QT about a planet inhabited with rare alien species. The Aloha Oe crew ventures into an unknown dimension when Meow foolishly engages their broken warp drive, in which Dandy then pulls on a wayward cosmic string and brings them to the planet by coincidence. Dandy and Meow set foot on this planet, only to be chased by giant creatures. When Dandy and Meow are unable to return to the spaceship, Dandy orders QT to activate a "secret weapon" that obliterates the entire planet and everything on it, including the crew.
2	2	"The Search for the Phantom Space Ramen, Baby"; Transliteration: "Maboroshi no Uchū Rāmen o Sagasu Jan yo" (Japanese: 幻の宇宙ラーメンを探すじゃんよ)	Sayo Yamamoto	Dai Satō	Hiroyuki Aoyama	January 12, 2014	January 11, 2014
Dandy is tipped off by Meow about a so-called "phantom ramen" made by an undiscovered alien species. The Aloha Oe crew travels to Ra-sta, a station filled with many ramen restaurants. Throughout the trip, Meow posts each location online using his phone, inadvertently leaving a trail for a scientist of the Gogol Empire named Dr. Gel, who sends armed forces to follow and capture Dandy. Scarlet, a receptionist at the Registration Center for captured space aliens, aids Dandy by easily defeating the armed forces on her own. After realizing that he is being tracked down, Dandy ejects Meow's phone outside the spaceship. The crew eventually finds the restaurant which sells the phantom ramen, but Dandy and Meow are sucked into a wormhole inside the ramen machine, bringing them to a ramen cart owned by an elderly alien named Pops, who serves them phantom ramen and tells a moving story about how he became a ramen salesman. Dandy and Meow then leap back to the restaurant, where QT is waiting for them.
3	3	"Occasionally Even the Deceiver Is Deceived, Baby"; Transliteration: "Damashi Damasareru Koto mo Aru Jan yo" (Japanese: 騙し騙される事もあるじゃんよ)	Hiroshi Hamasaki	Kimiko Ueno	Manabu Akita	January 19, 2014	January 18, 2014
Since the Aloha Oe crew is low on money and food, Dandy sets a course to the nearest BooBies to redeem a nearly expired point card. He abuses the warp drive to get there, causing the spaceship to crash-land on a planet inhabited by Ragians. The crew meets a young woman named Mamitas, who claims to have crash-landed on the planet as well, and she invites them to use parts from her spaceship to fix theirs. However, Dandy and QT are warned by the Ragians that Mamitas is actually a Deathgerian, the planet's most fearsome alien, shown when Mamitas later reveals her monstrous alien form and swallows Meow whole. Dandy and QT pilot the Little Aloha, an escape pod that transforms into a fighting robot, eventually defeating Mamitas by force-feeding her a ton of rancid space food left on board the Aloha Oe. Dandy and QT bring Mamitas in a container to the Registration Center, where Scarlet finally accepts the alien. Dandy and QT revel in their new fortune, though having forgotten about Meow.
4	4	"Sometimes You Can't Live with Dying, Baby"; Transliteration: "Shinde mo Shini Kirenai Toki mo Aru Jan yo" (Japanese: 死んでも死にきれない時もあるじゃんよ)	Directed by : Ikuro Sato; Storyboarded by : Namimi Sanjo & Hitoshi Nanba	Kimiko Ueno	Tomohisa Shimoyama	January 26, 2014	January 25, 2014
Meow is bitten by a Stiltonian captured by the Aloha Oe crew and later turns into a zombie. Believing that Meow is merely sick, Dandy and QT admit him into a hospital and leave him there overnight. Dandy and QT visit the hospital the next day, only to find it overrun by zombies. As Dandy and QT try to escape the hospital, they both end up being bitten and turned into zombies as well. From then on, Dandy, QT and Meow adjust to their new lives as zombies. They diet on yogurt instead of raw meat as advised by the Stiltonian, and they use Dandy's life insurance policy to maintain their less-than-normal lifestyle. After life insurance companies fail to control the zombie population, every human, alien and robot in the universe eventually becomes a zombie, thereby creating a utopia.
5	5	"A Merry Companion Is a Wagon in Space, Baby"; Transliteration: "Tabi wa Michizure Uchū wa Nasake Jan yo" (Japanese: 旅は道連れ宇宙は情けじゃんよ)	Akemi Hayashi	Ichirō Ōkouchi	Tomohiro Kishi	February 2, 2014	February 1, 2014
On Planet Humboldt, Dandy goes out to capture a Gentooan, a young girl named Adélie, who has the ability to transfer minds into dolls, but he is reluctant when the Aloha Oe has been towed away for a parking violation. Before Dandy decides to bring Adélie to the Registration Center to pay off the fine, Adélie convinces Dandy to take a detour to an apartment to meet with her grandfather, but she finds it occupied by a female tenant. That night, Dandy tells Adélie that he is going to a local BooBies, but he secretly traces her grandfather through the tenant instead. The next day, Dandy takes Adélie to the train station to meet with her grandfather, but Adélie misinterprets that Dandy is abandoning her. She transfers his mind into her penguin plushie before storming off, but she is soon kidnapped aboard a train by two vengeful alien hunters. Dandy attempts to rescue her while still in the penguin plushie's body, but Adélie's grandfather later arrives and defeats the alien hunters. Adélie thanks Dandy for finding her grandfather, and Dandy promises that Adélie can join his crew when she grows up.
6	6	"The War of the Undies and Vests, Baby"; Transliteration: "Pantsu to Chokki no Sensō Jan yo" (Japanese: パンツとチョッキの戦争じゃんよ)	Michio Mihara	Story by : Michio Mihara; Teleplay by : Dai Satō	Michio Mihara	February 9, 2014	February 8, 2014
The Aloha Oe crew heads to Planet Eden's moon, shown as a barren place, where they land after being attacked by lasers nearby. While exploring the surface, Dandy and Meow separately encounter an Undie and a Vestian. Each alien reveals that their races have been at war for 10,000 years because the Undies oppose vests while the Vestians abhor underwear, and they are now the only individuals left from each race. After fighting each other because of the aliens, Dandy and Meow convince each alien to sign a peace treaty. However, according to galactic law, the treaty can only be sealed if both aliens relinquish their clothing as their most prized possession to each other. Unable to do so, the aliens fight each other to the death. Before dying, both aliens fire doomsday missiles to obliterate Planet Eden's moon. Dandy and Meow manage to escape when QT tosses a space surfboard for them to surf their way out over the debris.
7	7	"A Race in Space Is Dangerous, Baby"; Transliteration: "Uchū Rēsu wa Denjarasu Jan yo" (Japanese: 宇宙レースはデンジャラスじゃんよ)	Directed by : So Toyama; Storyboarded by : Gorō Taniguchi	Kimiko Ueno	Yuriko Chiba & Eiji Nakada	February 16, 2014	February 15, 2014
Hoping to impress the ladies at BooBies, the Aloha Oe crew enters an intergalactic nebula grand prix against its glamorous reigning champion named Prince, his state-of-the-art robot named Z and his rat-like alien lawyer named Squeak. Dandy uses various tricks to stay ahead of his competitors until he catches up with Prince. At a pit stop, Meow runs out of fuel to refill Dandy's tank and is forced to substitute it with a mixture of various substances, while Squeak plants a bomb on the Little Aloha that he detonates once Dandy comes neck and neck with Prince. The resulting explosion causes a bizarre chain reaction with the fuel mixture that propels Dandy several billion years into the future, where he finds a Buddhist statue resembling himself.
8	8	"The Lonely Pooch Planet, Baby"; Transliteration: "Hitoribotchi no Wankoboshi Jan yo" (Japanese: 一人ぼっちのワンコ星じゃんよ)	Hiroshi Shimizu	Keiko Nobumoto	Hiroshi Shimizu	February 23, 2014	February 22, 2014
On Planet Machinia, a deserted planet made entirely of discarded metal and rubbish, Dandy finds a solitary dog. As QT and Meow go about their business, Dandy spends the last few hours of the dog's lifespan playing with her, naming her "Pup" before she eventually dies. Heartbroken by Pup's death, Dandy constructs a rocket to give her a proper burial in space. Putting Pup's death behind them, Meow soon discovers that he has picked up a pair of Machinians, the Le Flea Brothers, from Pup's fur. As QT and Meow comically chase the Le Flea Brothers throughout the spaceship, the Le Flea Brothers are unwittingly killed by Dandy. QT deduces that the planet will collapse on itself and form a black hole due to the deaths of these Machinians. The Aloha Oe crew manages to warp away in time, crossing paths with Dr. Gel and his assistant Bea, who wind up being pulled into the black hole.
9	9	"Plants Are Living Things, Too, Baby"; Transliteration: "Shokubutsu Datte Ikiteru Jan yo" (Japanese: 植物だって生きてるじゃんよ)	Eunyoung Choi	Story by : Eunyoung Choi; Teleplay by : Shinichirō Watanabe	Kiyotaka Oshiyama	March 2, 2014	March 1, 2014
QT beams Dandy and Meow onto Planet Planta, a planet inhabited solely by sentient plants, in search of a rumored rare alien known as "Code D". A mishap with the transporter sends Dandy to the planet's northern hemisphere populated by the cerebral Vegims, while Meow is caught by the tribal Movies in the southern hemisphere. With the aid of Vegim scientist Dr. H and his daughter 033H, Dandy traverses the planet's psychedelic landscape to the north pole where Code D is located. On the way there, the three are halted and arrested by Vegim leader Cocamuka, but they are later found and saved by Dr. H's friend Niinii. Meanwhile, Meow is fattened up by the Movies, unaware that they intend to eat him. Dandy discovers that Code D is actually a meteorite that caused the planet's flora to evolve into intelligent beings. Dandy's attempt to remove its stone inadvertently causes all the plants to regress into non-sentient organisms.
10	10	"There's Always Tomorrow, Baby"; Transliteration: "Ashita wa Kitto Tumorō Jan yo" (Japanese: 明日はきっとトゥモローじゃんよ)	Masayuki Miyaji	Kimiko Ueno	Seiichi Hashimoto & Hiroyuki Aoyama	March 9, 2014	March 8, 2014
The Aloha Oe crew makes an emergency landing on Planet Betelgeuse, Meow's home planet. They are taken in by Meow's family for the time being while their spaceship is being repaired. That night, the calendar in Meow's house is struck by a wayward blast of Pyonium energy sparked from a battle between the Gogol and Jaicro Empires, causing the events of that day to endlessly repeat themselves in a time loop. The crew finally realizes the circumstances on the 108th loop, determining that they must tear out Meow's calendar to break the loop. The calendar proves virtually indestructible, so they turn to Meow's metalworker father for help, and he successfully rips off the date with his screw machine, breaking the loop. The crew leaves on the newly repaired spaceship, as Meow realizes how much he loves his home planet after reliving it countless times.
11	11	"I'm Never Remembering You, Baby"; Transliteration: "Omae o Nebā Omoidasenai Jan yo" (Japanese: お前をネバー思い出せないじゃんよ)	Directed by : Hiroyuki Okuno; Storyboarded by : Atsushi Takahashi	Toh EnJoe	Hiroyuki Okuno; Hisashi Mori (Mechanical)	March 16, 2014	March 15, 2014
The Aloha Oe crew brings a red box to Scarlet at the Registration Center, believing it to contain a rare alien, yet having no memory of how it was acquired. The box actually contains an overdue library book that was checked out by Admiral Perry from Planet Lagado. A complimentary ticket is also found inside the book for a free trip to Planet Lagado. The crew arrives at the planet and transports to the surface, where the resident aliens refer to the book and ticket as their librarian and deputy librarian. It is explained that the book and ticket, named Alethia and Idea, are aliens that took control of the minds of Dandy, QT and Meow to escape from the Gogol Empire, which relates to their failure to recall the event. Before erasing their memories, Alethia gives them another red box as a gift, warning them not to open it early. The crew brings this box to Scarlet as well, in which it contains a videotape that also manipulates others' memories, starting an intergalactic war involving other video and computer storage devices that goes unrecorded in history.
12	12	"Nobody Knows the Chameleon Alien, Baby"; Transliteration: "Dare mo Shiranai Kamereon-seijin Jan yo" (Japanese: 誰も知らないカメレオン星人じゃんよ)	Directed by : Satoshi Saga; Storyboarded by : Toshio Hirata	Kimiko Ueno	Chikashi Kubota	March 23, 2014	March 22, 2014
Fed up with the costs of paying bounties for petty aliens, Scarlet challenges the Aloha Oe crew to capture a Chameleonian, a rare alien with the ability to mimic the appearance of any person, object or creature. Dandy, QT and Meow unknowingly happen upon the Chameleonian while on a fishing spree and bring their catch aboard their spaceship, where it begins to take various forms to outwit them and evade capture. The crew eventually encounters the Chameleonian in the form of Dandy, in which QT puts both of them through a series of questions to determine which Dandy is the impostor, but the Chameleonian becomes so adept at its disguise that it believes itself to be Dandy, thus making the two indistinguishable. When Dr. Gel later captures the Chameleonian in Dandy's form, the latter starts to impersonate the former in his form, causing Dr. Gel to succumb to Gestaltzerfall as he questions who he is, which leaves QT and Meow to ponder whether or not the remaining Dandy is the real one.
13	13	"Even Vacuum Cleaners Fall in Love, Baby"; Transliteration: "Sōjiki Datte Koisuru Jan yo" (Japanese: 掃除機だって恋するじゃんよ)	Shingo Natsume	Dai Satō	Tomohisa Shimoyama & Gosei Oda	March 26, 2014 (TV Osaka)	March 29, 2014
The Aloha Oe crew patrons a robot coffeehouse, where QT falls in love with a robotic Coffee Maker, who works alongside Mill Hopper and Cash Register. After visiting the coffeehouse many times, QT eventually asks Maker out for an evening stroll. One day, QT finds out from Mill that Maker and Register have been recalled to a seaborne landfill named Dream Island, since they have malfunctioned due to exhibiting emotions. QT sneaks onto Dream Island, where he is directed by Toaster to an appliance rave party. Although QT reunites with Maker, the two of them witness Register and the other discarded appliances converge with Toaster into the form of a giant mech to start a revolt against their human manufacturers at a nearby city. QT goes after the mech and attempts to reach the top, but is subsequently shot down. QT is suddenly struck by a wayward blast of Pyonium energy from one of Dr. Gel and Bea's experiments, enlarging him to gargantuan size and allowing him to dismantle the mech. QT returns to the Aloha Oe and drinks a cup of coffee that Maker had prepared for him earlier, causing him to short circuit.

=== Season 2 (2014) ===
No. overall	No. in season	Title	Directed by	Written by	Animation directed by	Storyboards	Japanese release date	English release date
14	1	"I Can't Be the Only One, Baby"; Transliteration: "Onrī Wan ni Narenai Jan yo" (Japanese: オンリーワンになれないじゃんよ)	Masahiro Mukai	Kimiko Ueno	Yoshiyuki Ito, Kazumi Inadome	Gorō Taniguchi	July 6, 2014	July 6, 2014 (Note: Adult Swim had moved Space Dandy from 11:30 p.m. to 12:30 a.m. EDT/PDT, effectively making the air dates the following day. Despite this, the series still aired hours ahead of Japan in real time.)
When the Aloha Oe crew brings a cow to the Registration Center, Scarlet suggests that they should consider looking for another career. While Dandy, QT and Meow later discuss the matter, Dandy pulls out a long stray hair from his head, which drags them all to an alternate dimension, where they encounter upgraded versions of themselves. This starts a recurring event when the crew keeps finding more stray hairs known as cosmic strings, sending them to various dimensions, where they find versions of themselves which parody other anime series. When they finally pull a cosmic string that sends them back to their dimension, all the other versions are accidentally brought back as well. Because strange events start occurring in their own dimension, especially after meeting an odd version of the trio, all versions of Dandy decide to fix things by burning all the cosmic strings, sending all incarnations back to their respective dimensions. However, the odd version of the trio replaces the original crew in their own dimension.
15	2	"There's Music in the Darkness, Baby"; Transliteration: "Yami ni wa Yami no Onshoku ga Aru Jan yo" (Japanese: 闇には闇の音色があるじゃんよ)	Seimei Kidokoro	Keiko Nobumoto	Yuriko Chiba, Eiji Nakada	Masashi Ikeda	July 13, 2014	July 13, 2014
After disbanding the crew due to an argument, Dandy later receives a letter inviting him to a mansion signed by "a rare alien", assuming this to be a beautiful alien chick. He flies the Little Aloha and crash-lands onto a planet surrounded by the River of Time, which has the ability to return objects to previous states in time when it occasionally reverses course known as a "Pororoca" event. Meanwhile, QT and Meow teleport from the Aloha Oe to the planet to find Dandy, but the two are turned into smiling statues by Ukuleleman, a masked puppet alien who plays a ukulele. At the mansion, Dandy is not only disappointed that the letter was written by Ukuleleman, but is also shocked that QT and Meow were being collected as smiling statues in the backyard. Dandy carries QT and Meow into the River of Time to return them back to normal, but as Ukuleleman tries to pull out a smiling version of Dandy in the past, Dandy charges at Ukuleleman and shatters his mask with one punch. Just before Ukuleleman bursts into flames, Dandy acquires the ukulele after telling Ukuleleman that he has a good smile.
16	3	"Slow and Steady Wins the Race, Baby"; Transliteration: "Isogabamawaru no ga Ore Jan yo" (Japanese: 急がば回るのがオレじゃんよ)	Masaaki Yuasa	Masaaki Yuasa	Masaaki Yuasa	Masaaki Yuasa	July 20, 2014	July 20, 2014
When Dandy spends all the food money on a flashlight teleporter, Meow turns it on out of anger and accidentally teleports Dandy's head to Planet Pushy Boyfriend. Dandy is greeted by a fish alien named Carpaccio, who is an astronaut from Planet Girlfriend, his home planet. After Meow teleports Dandy's body and himself to Planet Pushy Boyfriend, Carpaccio explains that he has been stranded on Planet Pushy Boyfriend for a decade, predicting that the sun will scorch both planets soon, as it has been a millennium since its previous occurrence. Dandy and Meow help carry Carpaccio's sailboat rocket to the surface of Planet Pushy Boyfriend, and they ride the waves that connect towards Planet Girlfriend. Upon arrival on the planet, Carpaccio races to his home, only to find that his ex-girlfriend Yoko is dating her new boyfriend Minato. Carpaccio fails to convince the fish alien residents that the sun will scorch the planet. Just as Meow finds new batteries to recharge the flashlight teleporter, Carpaccio chooses to commit suicide with the burning heat of the sun. Dandy manages to teleport Meow and himself back to the Aloha Oe, where Dandy and Meow decide to feast on Carpaccio's barbecued body.
17	4	"The Transfer Student Is Dandy, Baby"; Transliteration: "Tenkōsei wa Dandi Jan yo" (Japanese: 転校生はダンディじゃんよ)	Takaaki Wada	Hayashi Mori	Hiroyuki Aoyama	Takaaki Wada	July 27, 2014	July 27, 2014
On Planet Clipon, Dandy poses as a transfer student of Baberly Hills High at Andromeda Academy, where it is popularly known for its performing arts, in search of a rare alien species. Unfortunately, he has transferred in a week before the final exams, forcing him to cheat on all the tests during the week. Meow says that the rare Cliponian is a female with a flower on her head that blooms when she is in love, while QT informs him that there is an upcoming prom. Dandy chooses a homely female classmate named Freckles and trains her to be her prom date. On the night of the prom, Dandy challenges the prom queen named Sofia to a singing competition, which escalates to a large high school musical number, involving QT, Meow and even Freckles. After the graduation, the Aloha Oe crew departs from Planet Clipon, having forgotten about the rare Cliponian, which is revealed to be Freckles.
18	5	"The Big Fish Is Huge, Baby"; Transliteration: "Biggu Fisshu wa Dekkai Jan yo" (Japanese: ビッグフィッシュはでっかいじゃんよ)	Kiyotaka Oshiyama	Kiyotaka Oshiyama	Kiyotaka Oshiyama	Kiyotaka Oshiyama	August 3, 2014	August 3, 2014
While fishing in a lake, the Aloha Oe crew decides to head to Planet Kayu to track a Munagi, a rare fish alien that appears once every 3,600 years, because it is worth 50 million woolongs at the Registration Center. When the Aloha Oe gets stuck in "space kelp", Dandy teleports himself to the surface of Planet Kayu, where he quickly befriends a girl named Erssime. She takes Dandy to her house to see L'Delise, her grouchy old mentor. Dandy fails to find the Munagi after fishing in many areas of the muddy planet, but Erssime tells him that the Munagi can only be seen on the surface when a "blue moon" appears in the sky, according to legend. At night, QT and Meow spot the Rubini Comet heading towards Planet Kayu, while Dandy and Erssime head out to sea to catch up to L'Delise. The Munagi rises from the sea, but no one is able to catch it. Dandy uses a bow and arrow to latch onto the Munagi, but he loses his catch when the Munagi escapes into the Rubini Comet. The crew later returns to the lake, back to square one.
19	6	"Gallant Space Gentleman, Baby"; Transliteration: "Uchū Shinshi wa Jentoruman Jan yo" (Japanese: 宇宙紳士はジェントルマンじゃんよ)	Hiroshi Shimizu	Keiko Nobumoto	Hiroshi Shimizu	Hiroshi Shimizu	August 10, 2014	August 10, 2014
After leaving a professional wrestling match, BooBies waitress Honey is kidnapped by Dr. Gel and Bea onto their spaceship, but as they attempt to scan her brain for any clues about Dandy, their hard drive explodes because Honey is revealed to be half-Cloudian. Meanwhile, the Aloha Oe crew searches for a Cloudian for six months with no luck, but they find out about an all-you-can-eat buffet on Planet C'est la Vie, where Scarlet happens to be as well. Scarlet meets a Cloudian named Gentle Nobra, who escorts her to his mansion spaceship inside a massive pink cloud. The crew later catches up to Scarlet and Gentle, and Dandy tries to break the two of them up. Honey sends them a video message in need of rescue, but she later performs a piledriver on Dr. Gel and teleports away to escape on her own. Soon, an attack by the Gogol Empire forces everyone to flee the mansion spaceship, using its mansion escape pod to leave the cloud. Gentle finally reunites with Honey, revealed to be his half-sister Lady Nobra, but he departs in shame since most of his cloud was destroyed.
20	7	"Rock 'n' Roll Dandy, Baby"; Transliteration: "Rokkunrōru Dandi Jan yo" (Japanese: ロックンロール☆ダンディじゃんよ)	Sayo Yamamoto	Kimiko Ueno	Yoshiyuki Ito, Kazumi Inadome	Sayo Yamamoto	August 17, 2014	August 17, 2014
Johnny, commander-in-chief of the Jaicro Empire, wants to chase his dream of becoming a rock star. After hitting things off with Dandy at BooBies, the two decide to form a rock band called the Dropkix, in which Dandy is the lead vocalist, Johnny is the guitarist, QT is the drummer and Meow is the bassist. They manage to book a gig at a dive bar, but have yet to even write their first song, struggling to find inspiration for many days. On the day of the gig, they play in front of a scarce audience, but their publicity skyrockets when a video of a riot during the gig goes viral. The rock band is quickly signed by an agent and sent to Space Budokan for their big debut at a live concert. However, Johnny decides to duck out to lead a Jaicro Empire assault on a possible Gogol Empire weapons platform. At the last moment, Johnny changes his mind and crashes through the roof, allowing the live concert to commence. Their fame as a rock band is short-lived due to a fiery performance gone haywire, while this indirectly leads to a cessation of hostilities between the two empires.
21	8	"A World with No Sadness, Baby"; Transliteration: "Kanashimi no Nai Sekai Jan yo" (Japanese: 悲しみのない世界じゃんよ)	Yasuhiro Nakura	Shinichirō Watanabe	Yoshiyuki Ito, Kazumi Inadome, Chikashi Kubota	Yasuhiro Nakura	August 24, 2014	August 24, 2014
An unfortunate encounter with a dark nebula maroons Dandy on a mysterious planet called Planet Limbo populated by bizarre beings and even more bizarre environments. As he explores the strange landscape with a man named Ferdinand, Dandy scrambles to find a way back home. Dandy denies that sadness is an absent concept in this strange world of the seemingly dead, arguing that it is impossible for sadness and happiness to be entwined. Struggling with his memories of how he ended up on Planet Limbo, Dandy later meets a girl named Poe, who gives him an insightful look on life and death from her perspective of the planet. Poe sends Dandy to a different dimension back to the Aloha Oe where he never encountered Planet Limbo. This episode has a drastic change from the typical sound and art style, while its somber mood and alien design contrast sharply with the typical upbeat feel and vibrant comedic styles.
22	9	"We're All Fools, So Let's All Dance, Baby"; Transliteration: "Onaji Baka nara Odoranya Son Jan yo" (Japanese: 同じバカなら踊らにゃ損じゃんよ)	Masato Miyoshi	Keiko Nobumoto	Yoshimichi Kameda	Yoshitomo Yonetani	August 31, 2014	August 30, 2014 (Note: Adult Swim showed an Attack on Titan marathon on the night of August 30–31, 2014. To ensure it stayed ahead of Japan's broadcast, episode 22 was moved up from 12:30 a.m. to 11:30 p.m. EDT/PDT, and was the only program not preempted. The schedule returned to normal the following week.)
The Aloha Oe crew goes to Planet Grease for a legendary party in the hopes of winning a dance contest with the reward being 100 million woolongs, only to find themselves walking the streets of a ghost town. They head to the Grease Tourist Information Center, where they meet the Planet Chief, who wants to host the dance contest, with the reward being 700 million woolongs, to attract rare alien species known as Dancingians. The Planet Chief then coerces Dandy to participate in this contest. As various aliens arrive for this event, an upbeat dancing alien named Ton Jravolta makes a grand entrance and outmatches Dandy during the dance contest. However, Dandy plays a classical vinyl record purchased from a clerk at "Akashiku Records", causing everyone to age rapidly from old age to infancy and back to normal. At the same time, the music causes the planetary lichens to eventually merge into a large glowing ring, revealing to be the Dancingians. Dandy and Jravolta dance inside the ring of the Dancingians, resulting in a big bang that destroys the universe.
23	10	"Lovers Are Trendy, Baby"; Transliteration: "Koibito-tachi wa Torendi Jan yo" (Japanese: 恋人たちはトレンディじゃんよ)	Masahiro Mukai	Kimiko Ueno	Chikashi Kubota	Kotaro Tamura	September 7, 2014	September 7, 2014
Scarlet makes a deal with Dandy to pose as her boyfriend in hopes for her ex-boyfriend Dolph to stop stalking her. She offers Dandy 750 woolongs per hour, fascinating QT and Meow. Dandy and Scarlet head to Planet Trendy to do various activities together for one week, spending time at a ski resort, a beach and a fireworks festival, but Dolph keeps spying on Scarlet from a distance. When Dandy accidentally destroys Scarlet's insured house, he finds out that she collects martial arts movies just like he does. After that, they spend time at a pool bar, an outer garden street and a movie theater. At a summer colony, Dandy finally confronts Dolph and then proceeds to kiss Scarlet. Due to his reckless actions, Dolph is sent to jail and is given a restraining order. Feeling disheartened despite being paid by Scarlet, Dandy rushes to see her at a café bar. They both unknowingly miss sight of each other and walk their separate ways without noticing. The next day, Scarlet refuses to register an alien that Dandy captures, but it is hinted that they may have developed feelings for each other.
24	11	"An Other-Dimensional Tale, Baby"; Transliteration: "Jigen no Chigaugatari Jan yo" (Japanese: 次元の違う話じゃんよ)	Satoshi Saga	Toh EnJoe	Toshihiro Kawamoto, Tsunenori Saito	Fumihiko Takayama	September 14, 2014	September 14, 2014
At a mall, Dandy runs into his old flame Catherine, now a disembodied heart in a tesseract from a four-dimensional universe, and she seeks his help in finding a prince named Paul from a two-dimensional universe, which has entered the three-dimensional universe. Dandy reluctantly decides to help, considering that Paul dated Catherine after she left Dandy. Intrigued by the story about Catherine and Paul, Honey tags along to meet and marry Paul, but is disappointed to learn that he is just a blue rectangle with a yellow crown on top. It is then learned that Paul had brought the two-dimensional universe into the three-dimensional universe in the hope of getting Catherine back. Later, Dandy and Catherine discuss the secret of warping, which is that warping does not really exist and what they call warping is actually just traveling through the space between universes. Meanwhile, Dr. Gel and Bea have crossed into the two-dimensional universe by accident, then into a one-dimensional universe and finally into a zero-dimensional universe.
25	12	"Dandy's Day in Court, Baby"; Transliteration: "Sabakareru no wa Dandi Jan yo" (Japanese: 裁かれるのはダンディじゃんよ)	Atsushi Takahashi	Dai Satō	Michio Mihara	Atsushi Takahashi	September 21, 2014	September 21, 2014
In an intergalactic courtroom, Dandy is accused of murdering a Lumetian named Guy Reginald by striking him using a baseball just before his wife Rose Reginald returned home. The baseball actually belongs to a boy from Planet Turbo named Hiroshi, who claims that he was playing baseball with his friend Jack, but the baseball suddenly landed in Planet Suburbia. Jaicro Empire scientist Professor Duran explains that the baseball emitted traces of Pyonium energy, which caused it to transport through time and space. Although Rose is later accused of the murder, Duran believes that the Pyonium energy reacted to someone's murderous intent. The jury unanimously agrees that this came from Hiroshi, who was furious that Jack blocked him as a friend online. The judge clears Rose of all charges by revealing that Guy is a professional wrestler who was simply knocked unconscious by the baseball. It is shown that Dandy was asleep the entire time during his trial. The Aloha Oe crew exits the courthouse, only to be surrounded by the Gogol Empire armed forces.
26	13	"Never-ending Dandy, Baby"; Transliteration: "Nebāendingu Dandi Jan yo" (Japanese: ネバーエンディングダンディじゃんよ)	Shingo Natsume	Shinichirō Watanabe	Yoshiyuki Ito, Gosei Oda (mechanical, effects)	Shingo Natsume	September 24, 2014 (TV Osaka)	September 28, 2014
Dandy is captured and taken to the tower of the Gogol Empire Homeworld, where Dr. Gel and Bea extract Pyonium energy from Dandy to complete a large doomsday satellite that would gain access to other dimensions. Johnny mounts an assault on the Gogol Empire, while QT, Meow, Scarlet and Honey rescue Dandy, dodging various obstacles to get to the tower in time. Meanwhile, Bea is revealed to be a spy from the Jaicro Empire, but decides to act on his own intentions. However, Bea is crushed to death by Dr. Gel, who later entrusts Dandy to stop the satellite from activating. Dandy solely pilots Dr. Gel's spaceship in combat mode to reach and destroy the satellite. The shock wave from the explosion erases everyone and everything from existence. Dandy finds himself talking to the Narrator, who reveals himself as a being of omnipresence. The Narrator offers to make Dandy the new God of a new universe, but Dandy turns it down after realizing that he would not have a body anymore, leaving the new universe without a God. 14.8 billion years later, Dandy starts another adventure with QT on the Aloha Oe in the new yet godless universe.
