= List of Jewelpet Kira Deco characters =

This is the list of characters appearing in the anime Jewelpet Kira Deco.

== Kira Deco 5 ==
Pink Oomiya (大宮ぴんく, Ōmiya Pinku) / Shiny Pink (シャイニーピンク, Shainī Pinku)
Voiced by: Aki Toyosaki

Pink Oomiya is the main protagonist of the series and the only female member of the group KiraDeco 5 (キラデコ5, Kiradeko 5) and also Prof. Decorski's niece. She and the other members were summoned from the Human world in search for the fragments of the Mirror Ball called Deco Stones. She is born in Saitama Prefecture and attends middle school until she is appointed as a member of the group. She is very charismatic and yet usually found of shiny stuff, on which she and Ruby can relate to each other, even living with her while searching for the Deco Stones. Sometimes hesitant, she has inferiority complex despite being a good decorator, having a troubled childhood involving her wanting to have friends. Also, she rejects having a boyfriend of any kind due to one guy who rejected her friendship proposal. She then got over her friendless issue as she is not alone and finally had her own Jewel of Fate, the Pink Ruby (ピンクルビー, Pinku Rubī) due to overcoming her issues and being friends with Ruby herself. She used the said jewel to transform into her new form. By the end of the series, she bid farewell to Ruby and returns to the Human World, but also giving Ruby the photo she had as a gift.

She usually stay in Ruby's KiraKira Shop while she's in Jewel Land. She goes on the codename Shiny Pink, thought she doesn't have good fighting skills like the rest of the group. But she has expert skills when it comes to decorating things with shiny jewels and decors.

Retsu Akagi (赤城烈, Akagi Retsu) / Burning Red (バーニングレッド, Bāningu Reddo)
Voiced by: Takuma Terashima

Retsu is the leader of the KiraDeco 5 and also the most responsible of the group. Born in the Gunma Prefecture, Retsu is a hot blooded junior high school student who is full of courage and confidence. He always trains himself and thinks in the ultra positive side for the whole group. Thought he is full of courage, he is sometimes dimwitted to the point of confusing his teammates and the Jewelpets. He is very popular with the girls due to his burning spirit and personality, causing his little brother to get jealous. But he knows his younger brother's feelings well and admits his faults in the later episodes. On the last episodes, his link with Angela finally gave him his Jewel of Fate, the Red Angelite (レッドエンジェライト, Reddo Enjeraito) that allowed him to transform into his new form. By the end of the series, he and Midori had returned to the Human World while using his powers against evil.

He lives in a tree house during his stay in Jewel Land. He goes in the codename Burning Red and has exceptional fighting skills involving his fists. He also has high resistance over dark magic except when mentioning about his little brother causing him to lower his guard down.

Aokishi "Blue Knight" Ozaki (尾崎青騎士 「ブルーナイト」, Ozaki Aokishi "Burūnaito") / Blue Knight Blue (ブルーナイトブルー, Burū Naito Burū)
Voiced by: Daisuke Ono

Aokishi is the third member of the KiraDeco 5 and also a charming member of the group. He is very charming on his looks, which sometimes makes Garnet fall in love with him. He was once from Kobe, being a famous idol singer with many admirers until his fame faded. Thought to his fame, he felt emptiness in his life without real friends until he met the KiraDeco 5 in their mission to protect justice. Along with the others, he is summoned to Jewel Land for unknown reasons. In his stay in Jewel Land, he became Garnet's personal "sheep", also serving as the head butler. However, in the last episodes, he was fired by her and told to use his skills to protect every women in the entire world, allowing his Jewel of Fate: Blue Garnet (ブルーガーネット, Burū Gānetto) to materialize. He used it to transform into his new form. By the end of the series, he received an earring speaker as a present from Garnet before going back to the Human World so he can hear the girls seeking help.

He goes in the codename Blue Knight Blue and has good fighting skills using his legs.

Midori Akagi (赤城緑, Akagi Midori) / Smart Green (スマートグリーン, Sumāto Gurīn)
Voiced by: Aya Hirano

Midori is the fourth member of the KiraDeco 5 and also both the youngest and the smartest member of the group. He's Retsu's younger brother, also born in Gunma Prefecture. Usually he, very boastful but also hated being treated like a kid especially when Retsu treats him and wanted to have all the credit as the hero, as opposed to his big brother. Also he has jealousy issues to him due to him being superior than Midori. He ends up living with Labra and Angela and became their student, wanting to study their magic. But this ends up him giving them lectures. He finally become more open to his older brother after admitting his mistakes. In the last episodes, his link with Labra allowed him to receive his Jewel of Fate: the Green Labradorite (グリーンラブラドライト, Gurīn Raburadoraito) to transform into his new form. In the end of the series, he and his brother returned to the human world and finally became a junior high student.

He goes in the codename Smart Green and like his big brother, has good fighting skills. Thought he has problems regarding focus.

Kiichi Furano (富良野黄一, Furano Kiichi) / Slow Life Yellow (スローライフイエロー, Surō Raifu Ierō)
Voiced by: Yasutaka Sonoda

Kiichi is the last member of the KiraDeco 5 and also a big eater. Usually heavyweight, he lives a slow by peaceful life in Hokkaido until he joins the group. Kiichi is usually found of food and very gluttonous, but he is also caring, gentle and has a powerful stomach that can digest anything he eats, even endure Sapphie's bad cooking in some points. He is also reliable on cleaning dishes, good at sumo and also an expert on Haiku and Sumo. In the last episodes, his desire to protect others allowed his heart to link with Sapphie, creating his Jewel of Fate: the Yellow Sapphire (イエローサファイア, Ierō Safaia) which allowed him to transform to his new form. By the end of the series, he prepare some food for Sapphie before returning to the human world.

He stays at Sapphie's house during his stay in Jewel Land. He goes in the codename Slow Life Yellow.

== Supporting characters ==
Professor Decorski (デコリスキー博士, Dekorisukī Hakase)
Voiced by: Ai Shimizu

Professor Decorski is a female scientist who formed the Kira Deco 5. Usually supporting the group through comm links from the human world, she knows about the existence of Jewel Land as well as the calamity that's happening on both worlds. She ends her speeches with "~Deco" and can sometimes gives the group some expert advice. She is also used to be the Dark General's girlfriend until she broke up with him for unknown reasons. And doing all she can to prevent him from unleashing evil in the Human World. In the last episode, she is revealed to be Jewelina's spirit, reuniting with Jewelina's statue and becoming Decorina (デコリーナ, Dekorīna).

Deco Bus (デコバス, Deko basu)
Voiced by Yōji Ueda

A sentient bus decorated with Jewels, who has an ability to talk and think on its own. Having a bit of a neat freak personality and a gentleman, he has a special ability to fly, however it can be done if the Deco Bus is given some affection.

== Other characters ==
Sheep Butler (ひつじ執事, Hitsuji Shitsuji)
Voiced by: Yōji Ueda

The former head butler of Garnet's mansion who served her and her family for generation. However, despite he served her loyally, Garnet worried about his age and decided to fire him after Blue became the new head butler. Him being fired made him cold and desired revenge, something that Coal took advantage on and corrupted him using his magic. Despite being corrupted, he is swiftly defeated by Blue and reverted to normal. Now he is working at Topaz's clothing store.

Wolfgang (ウォルフガング, Uorufugangu)
Voiced by:Eiji Itō

Wolfgang is a bat caretaker of the Villa owned by Garnet's family and a former head butler. He usually takes care of the villa despite Garnet forgot it existed.

Goriking (ゴリキング, Gorikingu)
Voiced by:Kiyoyuki Yanada

A tyrant ruler of the Paradise Village, he is a gorilla who thinks he's the most handsome person in the village. His clothing is however composed of cardboard.

Mako (マコ, Mako)
Voiced by:Satomi Akesaka

A young girl hailing from the human world just like the KiraDeco 5, she hails in the city of Ueno in Japan. She came to Jewel Land due to power of the Jewel of Fate, a jewel necklace that she wore around her neck. Mako knows about the Jewelpets, especially Rald, who can actually cure her grandfather's illness due to they knew each other for a long time. After her grandfather met Rald once again and got cured, she went back to the human world with him.

Sanko (三幸, Sankō)
Voiced by:Yōji Ueda

Mako's grandfather, who also lives in Ueno. He's the one who gave Mako the Jewel of Fate. Since in his youth, he once worked in the zoo tending the Pandas, however they don't like him and he's always misunderstood. He is then transported to Jewel Land and met Rald for the first time, but the two didn't get along well and was attacked by him. But in the end, both him and the Jewelpet understood each other's feelings as his Jewel of Fate appeared. Before he goes back to the human world, he gave Rald his pink waistcoat as a sign of friendship. After he returned, his determination for his job returns.

He retires from his job years later and is suffering from low back pain and illness, but he is cured after he's been reunited with Rald. After that, he and his granddaughter returned to the human world.

== Decoranian ==
Dark General (ヤミの将軍, Yami no Shōgun)
Voiced by Yōji Ueda

The leader of the organization Decoranian, the Dark General is a mysterious person who gives Coal orders to get the Deco Stones. He appears as a man wearing a mask, and has 4 subordinates called the Four Heavenly Kings who serve him. He usually lives somewhere in Saitama and operates a base deep underground. But he has a much bigger past: The Dark General is once an unnamed person and also Prof. Decorski's former boyfriend, who possesses dark magical skills. He's the same person who actually unlocked coal out of his Jewel Charm State and took care of him. When Coal is all grown up, he orders him to do evil deeds and get the Deco Stones.

The Dark General also likes Online Gaming and spends some of his time playing the game Yami Quest, eventually using the name Yamirin. He had met up with Coal, using the name Kurotenshi and became friends, unknowingly he is hanging out with an ex-member of the Decoranian. Later in Episode 51, he used the power of the Yami Stones to become a much powerful version of himself and attack the Kira Deco 5 in Jewel Land. He is later defeated by Ruby's efforts on calling the other Deco Stones and reconstructing the Mirror Ball, purifying the Dark General back to his old self and revealing his true face to everyone, also carrying the last and final Deco Stone.

Kaiser (カイゼル, Kaizeru)
Voiced by Kohei Murakami

Kaiser is one of the Dark General's subordinates, the Four Heavenly Kings. First appearing in episode 33, he was given orders to monitor the Kira Deco 5 and plan tactics against them. Although he's a ladies' man, he's an expert spy and can track down the enemy's weaknesses, exemplifying with Ruby's and Pink's. Kaiser has impressive agility and magic skills and is well versed in disguises. He was defeated in episode 50.
