= Yasuhiro Nakura =

Japanese animator & director

Yasuhiro Nakura 名倉 靖博
- Born: January 10, 1959 (age 67); Hamakita, Shizuoka Prefecture, Japan
- Occupations: Animator, illustrator, character designer, director
- Years active: 1978–present
- Employer: Studio Carpenter (1978~1981)

Yasuhiro Nakura (Japanese: 名倉 靖博, Hepburn: Nakura Yasuhiro) is a Japanese animator, illustrator, character designer, and director.

== Early life ==
Nakura was born in Hamakita, Shizuoka, Japan, on January 10, 1959. His parents ran a textile shop.

== Career ==
He enrolled in an animation course offered by Toei Animation that he saw advertised in Manga Shounen and moved to Tokyo. After completing the course, he joined Studio Carpenter where he debuted as an in-between animator on Starzinger (1978), and later as a key animator on Dotakon (1981). He worked at Studio Carpenter for about three years and then went freelance, mainly for Toei Animation's works.

His character concepts were used for the 1984 television series Little Memole, which he also worked on as an animation director (his debut in the role). The following year, he was the animation director for Mamoru Oshii's film, Angel's Egg, with designs by Yoshitaka Amano, in which he supervised and corrected drawings to follow Amano's original image boards. In 1987, he served as character designer and animation director to another feature film, The Tale of Genji (1987) with director Gisaburō Sugii. In 1990, he participated in Moomin as the animation character designer, having been a fan of the series prior. He also served as the character designer and chief animation director for Rintaro's Metropolis (2001).

At some point in his career, Nakura began to take on more work as an illustrator, rather than an animator or animation director. While he continued to work on animated series and films, his output in either decreased significantly during the 1990s and 2000s. He was the character designer and chief animation director for the Tenshu Monogatari arc of Ayakashi: Samurai Horror Tales and was the animation director for Gothicmade in 2012, but contributed in minor key animation roles between them.

In the early 2010s, Nakura developed a relationship with animation studio Shaft as a key animator and animation director on the Monogatari series. His output in the industry increased during this time as he contributed to other Shaft series like Mekakucity Actors (2014) and contributed as a guest director, designer, and animator for an episode of the Bones series Space Dandy (2014). In 2016, Nakura worked as the main layout artist, layout setting designer, and art setting designer for Shaft's adaptation of March Comes In like a Lion. He also regularly contributed to some of the series' ending animation themes, which he storyboarded, directed, and animated on his own.

=== Style ===
Director and founder of studio Satelight Tsuneo Maeda, who was the animation technical director for The Tale of Genji, described Nakura as an emotional person, which he called rare among key animators, and that he was slow, which was connected to his tenacity and made his work attractive. Maeda also considered Nakura to not be pattern-based, and thus it was always difficult or mysterious as to how his drawings and work would come out. Although he said that it may be difficult for some of his drawings to be used, Maeda lamented that Nakura was able to create cuts of animation that others could never draw as well.

== Works ==
=== Teleivison series ===
Highlights main staff roles.

Year	Title	Director(s)	Studio	CD (Note: Character designer.)	CAD (Note: Chief animation director.)	AD (Note: Animation director.)	KA (Note: Key animator.)	Other roles and notes	Ref(s)
1978	Starzinger	Yuugo Serikawa	Toei Animation	No	No	No	No	In-between animator	
1981	Dotakon	Takeshi Shirato	Toei Animation	No	No	No	Yes		
1984	Little Memole	Osamu Kasai	Toei Animation	(Original)	No	Yes	No		
1990	Moomin	Hiroshi Saitou	Visual 80	Yes	No	No	No		
1991	Moomin 2	Takeyuki Kanda	Visual 80	Yes	No	No	No		
1996	Shounen Santa no Daibouken	Yuuji Mutou	Studio Deen	Yes	No	No	No		
2006	Ayakashi: Samurai Horror Tales	Kouzou Nagayama	Toei Animation	(Original concept design)	Yes	No	No	Tenshuu Monogatari episodes	
2012	Nekomonogatari: Black	Akiyuki Shinbo; Tomoyuki Itamura	Shaft	No	No	Yes	Yes	2nd key animator	
2014	Space Dandy 2	Shinichirō Watanabe; Masaaki Yuasa	Bones	No	No	No	Yes	Art setting Guest character designer Episode director Storyboard artist	
2014	Mekakucity Actors	Akiyuki Shinbo; Yuki Yase	Shaft	No	No	No	Yes	Picture book animation Storyboard artist	
2014	Hanamonogatari	Akiyuki Shinbo; Tomoyuki Itamura	Shaft	No	No	No	Yes	Key animator	
2016	Flip Flappers	Kiyotaka Oshiyama	3Hz	No	No	No	Yes	Key animator (OP)	
2016	March Comes In like a Lion	Akiyuki Shinbo; Kenjirou Okada	Shaft	No	No	No	No	Art setting Layout setting Main layout ED direction, storyboards, and animation	
2018	Zoku Owarimonogatari	Akiyuki Shinbo	Shaft	No	No	No	No	"Play"	
2020	Magia Record: Puella Magi Madoka Magica Side Story	Doroinu	Shaft	No	No	No	Yes		
2021	Pretty Boy Detective Club	Akiyuki Shinbo; Hajime Ootani	Shaft	No	No	No	Yes	Art setting Layout supervisor	
2022	RWBY: Ice Queendom	Toshimasa Suzuki; Kenjirou Okada	Shaft	No	No	No	Yes		
2024	Astro Note	Shinji Takamatsu; Haruka Kasugamori	Telecom Animation Film	No	No	No	No	Layout supervisor	

=== OVAs/ONAs ===
Year	Title	Director(s)	Studio	CD	CAD	AD	KA	Other roles and notes	Ref(s)
1985	Angel's Egg	Mamoru Oshii	Studio Deen	No	No	Yes	Yes		
1988	Bride of Deimos	Rintaro	Madhouse	No	No	No	Yes		
1988	Donguri to Yamaneko	Toshio Hirata	Madhouse; Project Team Argos	Yes	No	No	Yes		
2013	Space Battleship Yamato 2199	Akihiro Enomomto; Yutaka Izubuchi	AIC; XEBEC	No	No	Yes	No		
2022	The Tatami Time Machine Blues	Shingo Natsume	Science Saru	No	No	Yes	No		
2024	Monogatari Series: Off & Monster Season	Akiyuki Shinbo; Midori Yoshizawa	Shaft	No	No	No	No	Art setting	

=== Films ===
Year	Title	Director(s)	Studio	CD	CAD	AD	KA	Other roles and notes	Ref(s)
1980	Toward the Terra	Hideo Onchi	Toei Animation	No	No	No	No	In-between animator	
1980	Cyborg 009: Legend of the Super Galaxy	Masayuki Akehi	Toei Animation	No	No	No	No	In-between animator	
1982	Future War 198X	Toshio Masuda; Tomoharu Katsumata	Toei Animation	No	No	No	No	In-between animator	
1983	Dr. Slump: The Great Race Around the World	Minoru Okazaki	Toei Animation	No	No	No	Yes		
1984	Wata no Kunihoshi	Shinichi Tsuji	Mushi Production	No	No	No	Yes		
1985	Night on the Galactic Railroad	Gisaburō Sugii	Group TAC	No	No	No	Yes		
1986	Castle in the Sky	Hayao Miyazaki	Studio Ghibli	No	No	No	Yes		
1987	The Tale of Genji	Gisaburō Sugii	Group TAC	Yes	No	Yes	No		
1994	Rampo	Rintaro Mayuzumi; Kazuyoshi Okuyama	—N/a	No	No	No	No	Animation (live-action film)	
2001	Metropolis	Rintaro	Madhouse	Yes	Yes	No	No		
2004	Ghost in the Shell 2: Innocence	Mamoru Oshii	Production I.G	No	No	No	Yes		
2006	The Girl Who Leapt Through Time	Mamoru Hosoda	Madhouse	No	No	No	No	Assistant animation director	
2007	Miyori no Mori	Nizo Yamamoto	Nippon Animation	No	No	No	Yes		
2009	Summer Wars	Mamoru Hosoda	Madhouse	No	No	No	Yes		
2012	Gothicmade	Mamoru Nagano	Automatic Flowers Studio	No	No	Yes	No		
2013	Puella Magi Madoka Magica: Rebellion	Akiyuki Shinbo; Yukihiro Miyamoto	Shaft	No	No	No	Yes		
2016	Kizumonogatari I: Tekketsu-hen	Akiyuki Shinbo; Tatsuya Oishi	Shaft	No	No	No	Yes		
2017	Fireworks	Akiyuki Shinbo; Nobuyuki Takeuchi	Shaft	No	No	No	Yes		
2017	Blade Runner: Black Out 2022	Shinichiro Watanabe	Cygames Pictures	No	No	No	Yes		
2022	Inu-Oh	Masaaki Yuasa	Science Saru	No	No	Yes	Yes		

== Notes ==
=== Book citations ===
- Animage October (1985). Ogata, Hideo (ed.). アニメージュ1985年10月号「『メモル』から『天使のたまご』へ 名倉靖博の世界」 [Animage October 1985, "From 'Memole' to "Angel's Egg', the World of Yasuhiro Nakura"].
- Animage December (1985). Ogata, Hideo (ed.). アニメージュ1985年12月号 天使のたまご GUIDE BOOK [Animage December 1985, Angel's Egg Guidebook].
- Kindaeigasha (1986). ジ･アニメ 1986年 06月号 [THE ANIME June 1986]. ASIN B00HYAQ788.
- Camp, Brian; Davis, Julie (2007). Anime Classics Zettai! 100 Must-See Japanese Animation Masterpieces. Stone Bridge Press. ISBN 978-1-933330-22-8.
