= Sonny Boy (TV series) =

Japanese anime television series

- Key visual of the series
- Genre: Isekai; Science fiction; Survival
- Created by: Shingo Natsume
- Anime television series
- Directed by: Shingo Natsume
- Produced by: Motoki Mukaichi; Isao Ishikawa; Jitsurou Kikuchi; Kensaku Wada; Yuuko Matsui; Ayuri Taguchi
- Written by: Shingo Natsume
- Music by: Various (Note: The series utilizes multiple tracks by several composers throughout its run and does not credit any specific composers for the series' OST as a whole (with the exception of Conisch who composed the musical score for Episode 10).)
- Studio: Madhouse
- Licensed by: Crunchyroll: SA/SEA: Medialink
- Original network: Tokyo MX, KBS, SUN, BS Asahi, RAB
- Original run: July 16, 2021 – October 1, 2021
- Episodes: 12
- icon

Sonny Boy (Japanese: サニーボーイ, Hepburn: Sanībōi) is an original Japanese anime television series animated by Madhouse and written and directed by Shingo Natsume. The story follows a group of middle school students who are transported to an alternative dimension where some of them gain supernatural powers. In their quest to find their way home, they unravel the mysteries of this new world, and conflicts between them arise. The series aired from July to October 2021.

Sonny Boy has been noted for its non-traditional storytelling, occasionally skipping over major events and instead focusing on characters' reactions to those events. While fantasy elements are present, the series primarily uses its setting to explore psychological themes such as identity, social expectation, freedom, and loneliness. The series has been featured in several lists of best anime of its year, and has been praised for the quality of its production and animation and the originality of its visuals.

== Plot ==
Midway through a seemingly endless day of summer vacation, third-year middle school student Nagara and his class, along with transfer student Nozomi and the aloof and mysterious Mizuho, are suddenly transported to an alternate dimension. The group calls the new dimension "This World", and finds it has its own set of rules and physics. Over time, while trying to get back home, they realize that they have individual supernatural abilities, but also find it difficult to navigate their own interpersonal relationships.

The class later splits into two groups due to internal conflicts. As both the groups continue journeying to find their way back home, they discover many other students who have spent thousands of years in other "This Worlds".

== Characters ==
Nagara (長良)
Voiced by: Aoi Ichikawa (Japanese); Derick Snow (English)
A middle school student who keeps to himself. He has problems with his relatives, and is distant to his schoolmates, adopting a cold attitude towards them. He is initially shown to have no powers.
Nozomi (希)
Voiced by: Saori Ōnishi (Japanese); Luci Christian (English)
A mysterious transfer student from Berlin, who was seen by Nagara at the ceiling of the school, tearing apart some textbooks. She stands her ground no matter how hard the circumstances. When gone adrift, she gains the superpower "compass", which allows her to see a light at the distance that no one else is able to perceive.
Mizuho (瑞穂)
Voiced by: Aoi Yūki (Japanese); Tia Ballard (English)
A student who carries her grandmother's cats, Tora, Gen and Sakura, in a tote bag. She has an attitude of "going at one's own pace", and she's honest about her feelings. She tends to isolate herself to avoid being affected by her surrounding circumstances. She has the superpower "nyamazon", where her three cats can deliver her any object she desires. Having a power indispensable for survival, the other students come to rely on her, annoying her quite a bit.
Asakaze (朝風)
Voiced by: Chiaki Kobayashi (Japanese); Daman Mills (English)
A rebellious student who dislikes authority. He opposed the members of the student council who tried to control him, starting a dispute. His power allows him to control gravity, and he repeatedly helps Nagara and company in perilous situations.
Rajdhani (ラジダニ, Rajidani)
Voiced by: Hiroki Gotō (Japanese); Siddhartha Minhas (English)
A very intelligent student who, after going adrift, approaches the new dimensions with curiosity, and concentrates his efforts to elucidate the mysteries of this alternate world. He gains the power "Pocket Computer", which allows him to create objects through computer programs.
Hoshi (明星)
Voiced by: Ami Naitō (Japanese); Ry McKeand (English)
Born with a star-shaped birthmark below his left eye, he has a cute face in contrast with his mature personality. After going adrift with the rest, he starts to move behind the scenes, doing things like inciting Cap to become the leader of the students. He gains the power "Hope" that allows him to materialize images.
Pony (ポニー, Ponī)
Voiced by: Hana Sato (Japanese); Lauren Landa (English)
The president of the student council, she does not talk much and always has a cold facial expression. She works closely with Hoshi to organize the students. She gains the power "Switch" that allows her to make the things she has touched change places.
Cap (キャップ, Kyappu)
Voiced by: Yōji Ueda (Japanese); Patrick Seitz (English)
A robust student which always has a trademark baseball cap on. Even though he was elected the leader in the course of events, he really is a timid and gentle person. He was a baseball teammate of Nagara. He gains the ability "All-purpose club room" which lets him create diverse things when concentrating on an empty room.
Hayato (はやと)
Voiced by: Shōta Yamamoto (Japanese); David Matranga (English)
An easy-going person, he is one of the few close friends of Nagara. At the request of Hoshi, he made a list of everyone's powers in a notebook. After going adrift, he gains the ability "ET" which lets him turn on a little light in his index finger.
Shanghai (上海, Shanhai)
Voiced by: Kana Ogino (Japanese); Emi Lo (English)
A transfer student from abroad, she talks in Shanghainese. Belonging to the cool group, she is frequently together with Ace. She gains the ability to control electromagnetism.
Kossetsu (骨折)
Voiced by: Yuka Ozaki (Japanese); Emily Neves (English)
A female student with a fractured left arm, which is suspended in an arm sling. In episode 10, she becomes the narrator and reveals that she has been faking her ability to make objects stick to her body. Her true ability is "Monologue," which allows her to hear the voices of others' hearts. She has a crush on Asakaze and often accompanies him, but he only sees her as an errand girl. Despite knowing this, she uses her ability to maintain the demeanor he desires. According to Nozomi's letter, her real name is "Tsubasa."

== Production ==
=== Background and staff ===
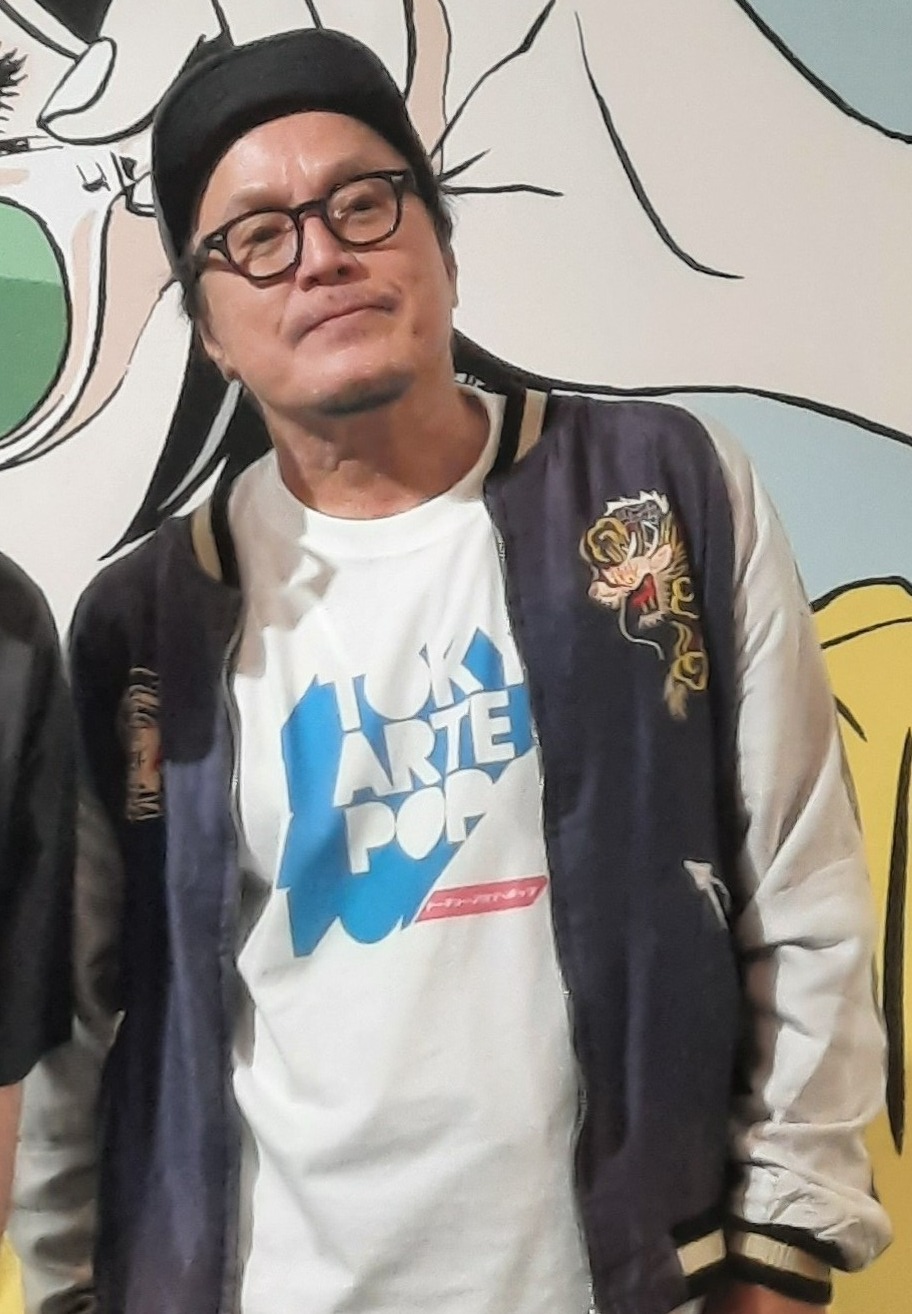
Director Shingo Natsume chose Hisashi Eguchi for the design of the characters based on a long-time appreciation of his work.

The series was animated by Madhouse and written and directed by Shingo Natsume, with original character designs provided by Hisashi Eguchi and Norifumi Kugai adapting the designs for animation. Producer Motoki Mukaichi had met with Natsume previously while working on Space Dandy, and he decided to offer Natsume the opportunity to produce an original series about anything he liked, making only minimal suggestions, such as the constant use of cliffhangers, thus giving him a great deal of creative freedom for the creation of Sonny Boy and the possibility to choose people for his team. The art director Mari Fujino decided to have traditionally painted backgrounds and settings, taking inspiration from painters like Henri Rousseau, and making constant use of complementary colors that, in her view, matched Natsume's writing. Natsume choose Eguchi as the character designer for Sonny Boy because he was a long-time fan of his work, and he paid homage to Eguchi in the series with a reference to his manga Stop!! Hibari-kun!, which can be seen being read by the character Mizuho at one point.

=== Writing ===
Natsume wrote the scripts for all the episodes, also making the storyboards for half of all the episodes. He says that he "tried to cram everything [he] wanted to express without holding back", taking advantage of the freedom he was given in the creation of the show. Notably, the series has very little use of monologues, which might seem unusual for an introspective story where their characters explore their emotions. This is intentional, as Natsume explains in an interview:

During the initial stage, I made a rule for myself that I wouldn't include anyone doing monologues. I've felt that lately, characters tend to say anything at all that's on their mind, or what they're going to do next, through monologues, and I don't think that's very entertaining to watch. Since this was going to be my own original series, I wanted to do away with that, so I made that rule for myself. Now, by doing away with the monologues, it's inevitable that the viewer can only tell what a character is going through emotionally by watching how they act. And there's a kind of ... How can I say this? I ended up creating a sort of internal grammar, you might call it, a visual grammar, as a result of that.

=== Music ===
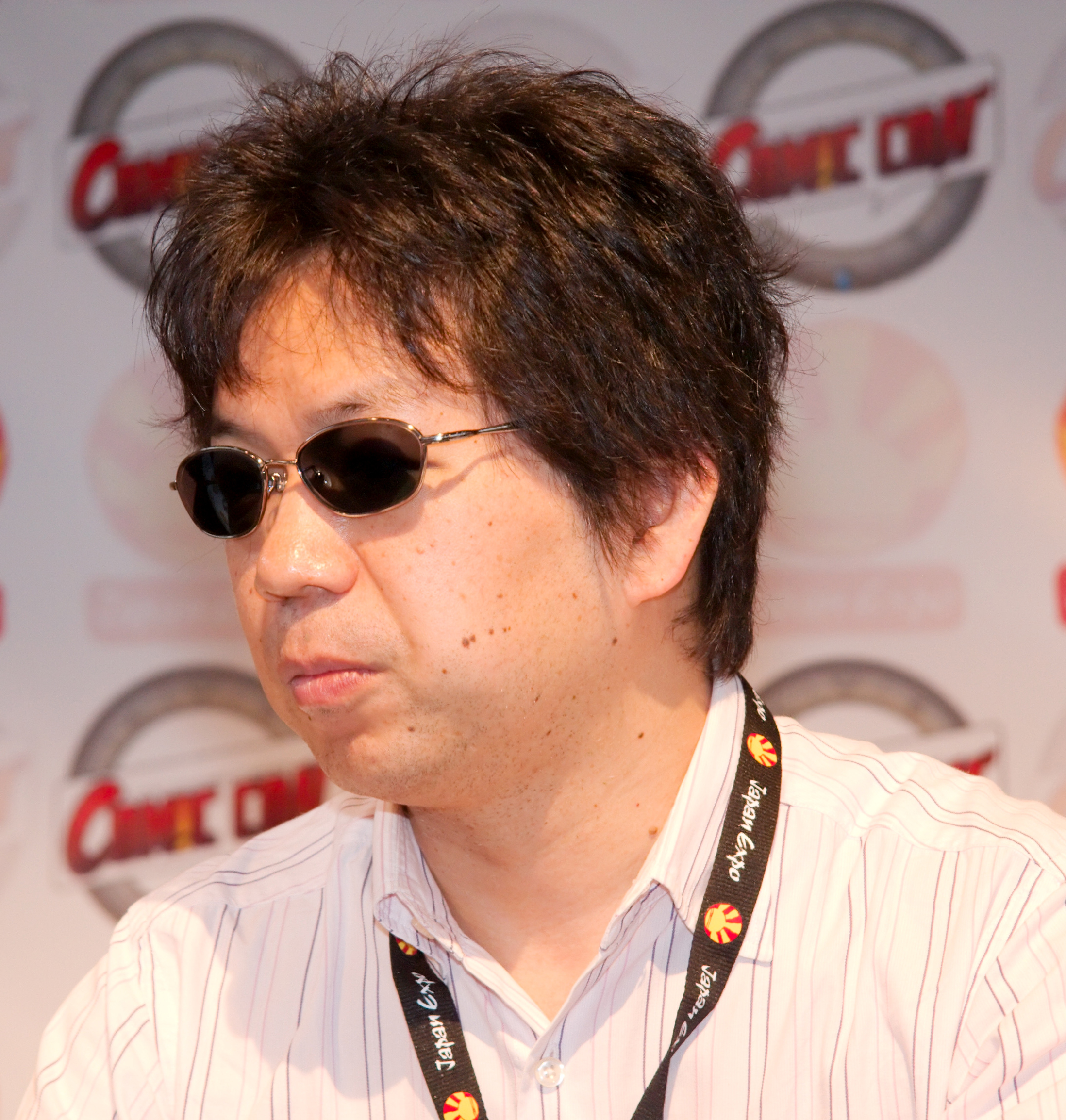
Shinichirō Watanabe, known for his evocative use of music in his work, was the musical advisor for Sonny Boy.

Natsume decided to have Shinichirō Watanabe as a musical advisor for the series. Watanabe introduced artists and bands that he considered had an appropriate style for the anime, but he explains that Natsume was the one to decide which ones to include in the soundtrack. Ging Nang Boyz performed the series' theme song "Boy Meets Girl" (少年少女, Shōnen Shōjo; lit. 'Boy Girl'), with Sunset Rollercoaster, VIDEOTAPEMUSIC, The Natsuyasumi Band, Ogawa & Tokoro, Mid-Air Thief, Kaneyorimasaru, toe and Conisch providing additional original songs created exclusively for the anime.

The Sonny Boy Soundtrack was released on September 8, 2021. Shinichirō Watanabe served as the musical advisor.

TV Animation "Sonny Boy" soundtrack
No.	Title	Lyrics	Music	Artist	Length
1.	"Boy Meets Girl (少年少女, Shōnen Shōjo; lit. 'Boy Girl')" (TV version)	Kazunobu Mineta	Mineta	Ging Nang Boyz	1:34
2.	"Broken Windows"		Kuo-Hung Tseng, Jewell Fortenberry	Sunset Rollercoaster	1:42
3.	"Seagull"		Tseng, Jewell Fortenberry	Sunset Rollercoaster	2:33
4.	"Summer Storm"		Videotapemusic	Videotapemusic	3:10
5.	"Tune from diamond"		MC.sirafu	The Natsuyasumi Band	4:36
6.	"Yozuri (夜釣り; lit. 'Night Angling')"		mitsume	mitsume	3:13
7.	"Let There Be Light Again"	Tseng	Tseng	Sunset Rollercoaster	3:47
8.	"Beacon"		Ogawa & Tokoro	Ogawa & Tokoro	2:50
9.	"Yamabiko's Theme"		Mid-Air Thief	Mid-Air Thief	10:35
10.	"Kodama's Theme"		Mid-Air Thief	Mid-Air Thief	3:20
11.	"Soft Oversight"		Ogawa & Tokoro	Ogawa & Tokoro	1:44
12.	"Sō to Seiji (ソウとセイジ; lit. 'Sō and Seiji')"		mitsume	mitsume	4:10
13.	"Kyō no Uta (今日の歌; lit. 'Song of Today')"	Mina Chitose	Chitose	kaneyorimasaru	3:56
14.	"Lightship"	Risa Nakagawa	Nakagawa	The Natsuyasumi Band	5:15
15.	"Spear (スペア, Supea)"	Moto Kawabe	mitsume	mitsume	4:57
16.	"Sonny Boy Rhapsody (サニーボーイ・ラプソディ, Sanī Bōi・Rapusodi)"	toe	toe	toe	4:05
17.	"Lune"		Conisch	Conisch	1:45
18.	"Jugement"		Conisch	Conisch	1:39
19.	"Tour"		Conisch	Conisch	3:18
20.	"Soleil"		Conisch	Conisch	2:36
21.	"Tabidachi no Hi ni (旅立ちの日に; lit. 'Day of the Departure')"		Hiromi Sakamoto	Conisch	4:54
Total length:					75:39

== Themes ==
Sonny Boy has been noted for its metaphorical and symbolical use of supernatural elements for social commentary, and as catalysts for conflicts between the characters, dealing with topics such as alienation, loneliness, social expectations, freedom and identity. Director Shingo Natsume declared in an interview that one of his main objectives was to show the friction between maintaining order and individual freedom, saying "[t]he story is inspired by the illogicalities that can sprout through rules". He furthers explains the symbolism used in the series, and how these elements reflect the psychology and growth of the protagonists. He considers Nagara to mirror his feelings during his teenage years, reflecting how he was always constrained back then. Collider's David Lynn comments how the show "addresses themes of capitalist exploitation, social isolation, and the power of community", constantly presenting many different philosophical topics, and "not so much answering any questions as much as asking and then pondering on them"

In his honors thesis, Inoue (2023) analyzes two anime with multiverse settings, The Tatami Galaxy and Sonny Boy, comparing them and commenting how they explore the experiences of Japanese adolescents growing up in their country's modern society. He states that Sonny Boy reflects people's desire for maintaining order, especially in times of crisis. In the first episode, the leaders of the school student council send a "Group Talk" invitation to the rest of students, asking them to choose a leader to follow, and then assigning tasks for everyone with the purpose of keeping order, which echoes the rigid structure of Japanese schooling system, where the students are expected to follow rules first and foremost without causing any trouble nor deviating from the norm. He also comments on the growth of protagonist Nagara throughout the series, deeming it the main message of the show: he starts as an apathetic individual with a very nihilistic outlook of life, but changes to a more optimistic attitude later on due to his interactions with Nozomi, who has a more positive disposition from the start, which is reflected symbolically in her superpower, a "compass" that allows her to "see the way out" of the darkness surrounding the school in order to return home.

== Release ==
The anime television series was announced on April 28, 2021. While the first episode was given an early premiere on June 19, 2021, the series officially aired from July 16 to October 1, 2021, on Tokyo MX and other channels. (Note: Tokyo MX listed the series premiere at 24:30 on July 15, 2021, which is July 16 at 12:30 a.m.)

The series was licensed outside of Asia by Funimation. On September 14, 2021, Funimation announced the series would receive an English dub, which premiered on September 16. Following Sony's acquisition of Crunchyroll, the series was moved to Crunchyroll. Medialink licensed the series in South and Southeast Asia and streamed it in their YouTube channel.

On December 16, 2022, a Blu-ray box was announced, which includes scenes from the last episodes that were not used, together with some previews of the anime and recordings of the songs.

=== Episodes ===
No.	Title (Note: All English titles are taken from Funimation.)	Directed by	Written by	Storyboarded by	Original release date
1	"The Island at the Far End of Summer"; Transliteration: "Natsu no Hate no Shima" (Japanese: 夏の果ての島)	Shingo Natsume	Shingo Natsume	Shingo Natsume	July 16, 2021 (Note: This episode was pre-screened on June 19, 2021.)
2	"Aliens!"; Transliteration: "Eirianzu" (Japanese: エイリアンズ)	Tomoya Kitagawa	Shingo Natsume	Shingo Natsume	July 23, 2021
3	"The Cat Who Wore Sandals"; Transliteration: "Geta o Haita Neko" (Japanese: 下駄を履いたネコ)	Keiichirō Saitō	Shingo Natsume	Keiichirō Saitō	July 30, 2021
4	"The Great Monkey Baseball"; Transliteration: "Idainaru Monkī Bēsubōru" (Japanese: 偉大なるモンキー・ベースボール)	Imu Gahi	Shingo Natsume	Yoshiaki Kawajiri	August 6, 2021
5	"Leaping Classrooms"; Transliteration: "Tobu Kyōshitsu" (Japanese: 跳ぶ教室)	Rei Ishikura	Shingo Natsume	Shingo Natsume	August 13, 2021
6	"The Long Goodbye"; Transliteration: "Nagai Sayonara" (Japanese: 長いさよなら)	Tomoya Kitagawa	Shingo Natsume	Shingo Natsume	August 20, 2021
7	"Road Book"; Transliteration: "Rōdo Bukku" (Japanese: ロード・ブック)	Kento Matsui	Shingo Natsume	Yoshiaki Kawajiri	August 27, 2021
8	"Laughing Dog"; Transliteration: "Warai Inu" (Japanese: 笑い犬)	Keiichirō Saitō	Shingo Natsume	Keiichirō Saitō	September 3, 2021
9	"This Salmon Chazuke Is Missing Its Salmon Nya"; Transliteration: "Kono Sake Chazuke, Sake Wasureteru Nya" (Japanese: この鮭茶漬け、鮭忘れてるニャ)	Atsushi Kashiwa	Shingo Natsume	Keisuke Kojima	September 10, 2021
10	"Summer and the Demon"; Transliteration: "Natsu to Shura" (Japanese: 夏と修羅)	Tomoya Kitagawa; Kento Matsui	Shingo Natsume	Shingo Natsume	September 17, 2021
11	"The Young Man and the Sea"; Transliteration: "Shōnen to Umi" (Japanese: 少年と海)	Nichika Ōno	Shingo Natsume	Norifumi Kugai	September 24, 2021
12	"Two Years' Vacation"; Transliteration: "Ni Nenkan no Kyūka" (Japanese: 二年間の休暇)	Shingo Natsume	Shingo Natsume	Shingo Natsume	October 1, 2021

== Reception ==
=== Critical reception ===
Sonny Boy has received favorable reviews, having been called one of the best anime of its season and of its year, and it has been noted as particularly original within the isekai genre. Comic Book Resources's Maria Remizova considered the series to be the best modern anime overlooked by audiences, writing that it "encapsulates the allure of anime's more bizarre and experimental side, utilizing unconventional storytelling and visual techniques to craft a perfect mystery narrative", and further explaining that, while confusing at first, the story became very rewarding as it developed. Evan D. Mullicane from Screen Rant proposed that Sonny Boy was a deconstruction of the main theme of isekai, writing that "Far from the fun getaway of many isekai anime, Sonny Boy's This World keeps its residents as captives and prevents them from growing", thus making a critique of the escapism that is ever-present in the genre. In Den of Geek, Vernieda Vergara commented on the non-standard storytelling of the anime, remarking how the series did not offer clear-cut answers to all the mysteries that the characters encountered, and even though that might put some people off, it offered "something fresh and unique", that stood in contrast with the more straightforward mainstream blockbuster anime that came out the same year. Collider's David Lynn commented that although some initial parallels to Lord of the Flies could be drawn, the series "expands far beyond simple comparisons to its inspirations" addressing many different social and philosophical topics, and "ultimately challenging its characters to consider the very purpose of life". Lynn also noted that while the non-traditional narrative might be a major turn off for some, the series still offered compelling stories without falling into "despondent nihilism".

Sonny Boy has been praised for its original production, featuring a very distinctive style of animation and surreal visual elements. Lynn commended how the animation work helped to accentuate the otherworldly settings of the series, calling it "a poster child for productions that can only be done justice in animation". Mullicane called it "one of the most gorgeous-looking anime of the past few years", commending the way that the animation helps to relate a "deeply personal story". Ayaan Shams Siddiquee from The Daily Star commented on its "[b]reath-taking visuals, art, and animation", which he found "more realistic and surreal than most modern anime", also complimenting the use of its "eccentric soundtrack" interspersed within the silence.

=== Accolades ===
Sonny Boy received the Excellence Award in the animation category at the 25th Japan Media Arts Festival. The series was nominated for Anime of the Year and Best Director (Shingo Natsume) at the 6th Crunchyroll Anime Awards. The series was also nominated for the Anime Trending Awards in four categories "Best in Original Screenplay", "Best in Sceneries and Visuals", "Mystery or Psychological Anime of the Year" and "SciFi or Mecha Anime of the Year".
