= The Tale of Genji (disambiguation) =

The Tale of Genji is a classic work of Japanese literature.

The Tale of Genji may also refer to:

- The Tale of Genji (1951 film), directed by Kōzaburō Yoshimura
- The Tale of Genji (1966 film), directed by Tetsuji Takechi
- The Tale of Genji (1987 film), directed by Gisaburo Sugii
- The Tale of Genji (manga), a Japanese manga version

== See also ==
- Sennen no Koi Story of Genji, a 2001 film directed by Tonko Horikawa
