= Scar on the Praeter =

Japanese anime television series

プロジェクトスカード プレイタの傷 (Purojekuto Sukādo Pureita no Kizu)
- Created by: Frontier Works; GoHands
- Manga

Project Scard: Kemono-tachi no Seigi
- Written by: Yui Kuroe
- Published by: Kodansha
- Magazine: Shōnen Magazine Edge
- Original run: September 17, 2020 – February 17, 2021
- Volumes: 1
- Anime television series
- Directed by: Shingo Suzuki
- Produced by: Kazuhiko Hasegawa; Fuminori Yamazaki; Hiroshi Kamei; Toshiyasu Hayashi; Yoshinori Hasegawa; Takuya Matsumoto
- Written by: Tamazō Yanagi
- Music by: Conisch; GOON TRAX
- Studio: GoHands
- Licensed by: Crunchyroll: SA/SEA: Muse Communication
- Original network: JNN (MBS, TBS, BS-TBS)
- English network: US: Crunchyroll Channel
- Original run: January 9, 2021 – April 3, 2021
- Episodes: 13
- icon

Scar on the Praeter or Project Scard: Scar on the Praeter (プロジェクトスカード プレイタの傷, Purojekuto Sukādo Pureita no Kizu) is a Japanese anime television series produced by GoHands based on the Project Scard media project by Frontier Works. The series aired from January to April 2021 on the Animeism programming block.

== Characters ==
Yamato Kai (甲斐 ヤマト, Kai Yamato)
Voiced by: Arthur Lounsbery (Japanese); Ryan Colt Levy (English)
Eiji Arashiba (嵐柴 エイジ, Arashiba Eiji)
Voiced by: Atsushi Kousaka (Japanese); A.J. LoCascio (English)
Kazuma Arashiba (嵐柴 カズマ, Arashiba Kazuma)
Voiced by: Shōya Chiba (Japanese); Darrel Delfin (English)
Kagami Sakishima (茶木縞 カガミ, Sakishima Kagami)
Voiced by: Junya Enoki (Japanese); Chris Hackney (English)
Ran Washimine (鷲峰 ラン, Washimine Ran)
Voiced by: Takeaki Masuyama (Japanese); Jonah Scott (English)
Jin Karasue (烏末 ジン, Karasue Jin)
Voiced by: Sho Nogami (Japanese); Cory Yee (English)
Kouga Tatsuma (龍眞 コウガ, Tatsuma Kōga)
Voiced by: Taku Yashiro (Japanese); David Rosenberg (English)
Itsuki Torataka (虎尊 イツキ, Torataka Itsuki)
Voiced by: Tasuku Hatanaka (Japanese); Landon McDonald (English)
Hokuto Kurama (鞍馬 ホクト, Kurama Hokuto)
Voiced by: Katsumi Fukuhara
Hræsvelgr Sakiyo (先代 フレスヴェルグ, Sakiyo Furesuverugu)
Voiced by: Kenjiro Tsuda
Morrigan Sakiyo (先代 モリガン, Sakiyo Morigan)
Voiced by: Yōji Ueda

== Production and release ==
On September 6, 2020, the anime original television series was announced by Frontier Works. The series is animated by GoHands, using Unreal Engine 4 for the 3DCG backgrounds, and directed by Shingo Suzuki. Suzuki will also design the characters. Tamazō Yanagi is handling series composition, and Conisch and Goon Trax are composing the series' music. It aired from January 9 to April 3, 2021, on the Animeism programming block on MBS, TBS, and BS-TBS. Funimation licensed the series and streamed it on its website in North America and the British Isles, in Europe through Wakanim, and in Australia and New Zealand through AnimeLab. Following Sony's acquisition of Crunchyroll, the series was moved to Crunchyroll.

No.	Title	Directed by (Note: Information is taken from the ending credits of each episode.)	Written by	Original release date
1	"The Town Had Its Hero"; Transliteration: "Kono Machi ni wa Eiyū ga Ita" (Japanese: この街には英雄がいた)	Katsumasa Yokomine	Tamazō Yanagi	January 9, 2021
2	"Cerberus"; Transliteration: "Keruberosu" (Japanese: ケルベロス)	Masayuki Tachibana	Tamazō Yanagi	January 16, 2021
3	"The Twin Wings of Artemis"; Transliteration: "Arutemisu no Sōyoku" (Japanese: アルテミスの双翼)	Masayuki Tachibana	Tamazō Yanagi	January 23, 2021
4	"Public Security Special Service"; Transliteration: "Kōan Tokumu" (Japanese: 公安特務)	Hiromitsu Kanazawa; Tetsuichi Yamagishi	Tamazō Yanagi	January 30, 2021
5	"We the Twin Wings Do Solemnly Swear"; Transliteration: "Warera Sōyoku wa Chikau" (Japanese: 我ら双翼は誓う)	Hiromitsu Kanazawa; Tetsuichi Yamagishi	Tamazō Yanagi	February 6, 2021
6	"Justice With Force"; Transliteration: "Chikara ni Yoru Seigi" (Japanese: 力による正義)	Masayuki Tachibana	Tamazō Yanagi	February 13, 2021
7	"Dusk Arrives"; Transliteration: "Dasuku Arawaru" (Japanese: ダスク現る)	Masayuki Tachibana	Tamazō Yanagi	February 20, 2021
8	"Dawn"; Transliteration: "Yoake" (Japanese: 夜明け)	Katsumasa Yokomine	Tamazō Yanagi	February 27, 2021
9	"The Warg's Claw Marks"; Transliteration: "Marō no Tsumeato" (Japanese: 魔狼の爪痕)	Katsumasa Yokomine	Tamazō Yanagi	March 6, 2021
10	"The Moon and the Sun"; Transliteration: "Tsuki to Taiyō to" (Japanese: 月と太陽と)	Tetsuichi Yamagishi	Tamazō Yanagi	March 13, 2021
11	"Fenrir"; Transliteration: "Fenriru" (Japanese: フェンリル)	Tetsuichi Yamagishi	Tamazō Yanagi	March 20, 2021
12	"The Blockade of Akatsuki"; Transliteration: "Akatsuki Fūsa" (Japanese: 暁封鎖)	Masayuki Tachibana	Tamazō Yanagi	March 27, 2021
13	"Hero of Akatsuki"; Transliteration: "Akatsuki no Eiyū" (Japanese: 暁の英雄)	Masayuki Tachibana	Tamazō Yanagi	April 3, 2021
