= Ghost (2027 film) =

- Theatrical release poster
- Ghost/夜の果て
- Directed by: Shingo Natsume
- Screenplay by: Shingo Natsume; Tomohiro Suzuki
- Edited by: Kashiko Kimura
- Music by: Ohzora Kimishima
- Production company: Madhouse
- Distributed by: Bandai Namco Filmworks
- Release date: February 11, 2027
- Country: Japan
- Language: Japanese

Ghost (Japanese: Ghost/夜の果て, Hepburn: Gōsuto/Yoru no Hate) is an upcoming original anime film directed by Shingo Natsume. It is written by Natsume and Tomohiro Suzuki, produced by Madhouse, and distributed by Bandai Namco Filmworks. It features character concepts by Natsume Ono, character designs by Norifumi Kugai, and music by Ohzora Kimishima. It is scheduled to open in Japanese theaters on February 11, 2027. The film will feature six songs by the band Hitsujibungaku, including the insert song "Sugar" and the theme song "Life".

== Voice cast ==
Character	Japanese
Neekei	Mayu Hotta
Masu	Issey Takahashi
Moby Dick	Kenjiro Tsuda
Karate	Hiroki Yasumoto
Itō	Hiroshi Kamiya
Bora	Takeo Ōtsuka
Ahab	Kazuhiro Yamaji
Structure	Yuuki Shin
Mike	Hina Yōmiya
Masu's son	Atsumi Tanezaki

== Manga adaptation ==
A manga adaptation, illustrated by Himiko, began serialization in Kadokawa Shoten's Young Ace magazine on August 4, 2026.
