= Conisch =

Japanese composer (born 1981)

- Born: April 19, 1981 (age 45)
- Genres: Electronic, jazz
- Occupations: Composer, musician, producer
- Instruments: Keyboard, piano
- Website: conisch.com

Conisch (コーニッシュ, Kōnisshu; born April 19, 1981) is a Japanese composer, arranger, music producer, pianist and keyboardist. His real name is Hiroaki Konishi (小西宏明, Konishi Hiroaki).

== Biography ==
Conisch was born on April 19, 1981. He graduated from Waseda Jitsugyo High School, and attended the Toho Gakuen School of Music where he partially completed a program in composition.

== Discography ==
=== Anime works ===
Year	Anime title	Role(s)
2005	To Heart 2	Composer
2007	Hitohira	Composer
2008–2009	Linebarrels of Iron	Composer
2009	Hipira: The Little Vampire	Composer
2009–2010	Hetalia: Axis Powers	Composer
2010	Hetalia: Axis Powers – Paint it, White!	Composer
2010–2011	Hetalia: World Series	Composer, B-side song (Note: The song he arranges is "England's Evil Demon Summoning Song" (悪魔を呼びそうなイギリスの唄).) arrangement
2010–2012	Mardock Scramble	Composer, theme song arrangement
2011	Appleseed XIII	Composer, theme song composition
2011–2012	Yu-Gi-Oh! Zexal	Composer
2012–2014	Yu-Gi-Oh! Zexal II	Composer
2013	Hetalia: The Beautiful World	Composer
2014	Zetsumetsu Kigu Shōjo Amazing Twins	Composer
2015	Hetalia: The World Twinkle	Composer
2017	Recovery of an MMO Junkie	Composer
2020	Pokémon: Twilight Wings	Composer
2021	Hetalia: World Stars	Composer
2021	Scar on the Praeter	Composer
2021	Sonny Boy	Insert-song arrangements
2022	Pokémon: Hisuian Snow	Composer
2023–present	Pokémon Horizons: The Series	Composer
2025	Let's Play	Composer
2026	Cosmic Princess Kaguya!	Composer
