= The Tale of Genji (1987 film) =

Japanese animated film

Japanese name
- Kanji: 源氏物語
Transcriptions
- Revised Hepburn: Genji Monogatari
- Directed by: Gisaburō Sugii
- Starring: Morio Kazama
- Music by: Haruomi Hosono
- Production company: Group TAC
- Distributed by: Nippon Herald Films
- Release date: December 19, 1987 (Japan)
- Running time: 106 minutes
- Country: Japan
- Language: Japanese

The Tale of Genji is a 1987 animated adaptation of The Tale of Genji, directed by Gisaburō Sugii.

== Plot ==
The movie adapts elements of the first third of The Tale of Genji, depicting the life of Hikaru Genji in the Imperial Court of the Heian period.

== Cast ==
- Morio Kazama as Hikaru Genji
- Miwako Kaji as Lady Rokujō
- Jun Fubuki as Oborozukiyo (朧月夜)
- Hagio Midori as Yugao
- Megumi Yokoyama (actress) as Lady Murasaki
- Yazaki Shigeru as Koremitsu
- Nachi Nozawa as Emperor Kiritsubo
- Tokita Fujio as the Priest of Kitayama
- Reiko Ohara as Lady Fujitsubo (藤壺)

== Production ==
The movie was directed by Gisaburō Sugii. The character designer and animation director was Yasuhiro Nakura. The movie was a joint production of Asahi Sonorama, the Asahi Broadcasting Corporation, and Kadokawa Daiei Studio. A home video version was released in 2000.

== Music ==
The film’s score, composed by Japanese musician Haruomi Hosono, was ranked the 39th best score of all time by online music publication, Pitchfork.
