= Yōji Ueda =

Japanese voice actor

- 上田 燿司
- Born: August 7, 1971 (age 55); Hyōgo, Japan
- Occupation: Voice actor
- Years active: 2001–present
- Agent: Amuleto
- Spouse: Yūko Nagashima (m. 2006)
- Children: 1

Yōji Ueda (上田 燿司, Ueda Yōji; born August 7, 1971) is a Japanese voice actor formerly affiliated with Mausu Promotion and currently affiliated with Amuleto. His name was Yōji Ueda (上田 陽司, Ueda Yōji) until April 1, 2008.

== Filmography ==
=== Anime series ===
- Bakusō Kyōdai Let's & Go!! WGP (1997) (Luchino)
- Naruto (2002) (Mubi, Gamakichi)
- Ikki Tousen (2003) (Genjo Kakouton)
- Azusa, Otetsudai Shimasu! (2004) (Nakasato Akira)
- Burst Angel (2004) (Salesclerk)
- DearS (2004) (No. 3)
- Basilisk (2005) (Kisaragi Saemon)
- Bleach (2005) (Maned Shinigami)
- Fighting Beauty Wulong (2005) (Kumakubo)
- 009-1 (2006) (Dr. Green)
- Kotetsushin Jeeg (2007) (Senjirou Shiba)
- La Corda d'Oro: Primo Passo (2007) (Music Teacher)
- Sayonara, Zetsubou-Sensei (2007) (Kagerō Usui)
- 11eyes (2009) (Avaritia)
- Chrome Shelled Regios (2009) (Vanze Haldey)
- Maria Holic (2009) (Narrator)
- Ristorante Paradiso (2009) (Teo)
- And Yet the Town Moves (2010) (Narrator)
- Naruto Shippuden (2010) (Ko Hyuga)
- Blood-C (2011) (Furu-Kimono)
- The Idolmaster (2011) (Fortune Teller)
- Hiiro no Kakera (2012) (Drei)
- JoJo's Bizarre Adventure (2012–13) (Robert E.O. Speedwagon)
- Robotics;Notes (2012) (Mitsuhiko Nagafukada)
- Bakumatsu Gijinden Roman (2013) (Tokugawa Isesada)
- Monogatari: Second Season (2013) (Kuchinawa)
- Kanetsugu & Keiji (2013) (Toyotomi Hideyoshi)
- Senyu (2013) (Mii-chan)
- Transformers Go! (2013) (Bakudōra)
- Akame ga Kill! (2014) (Bill)
- Blade & Soul (2014) (Earl)
- Inari, Konkon, Koi Iroha (2014) (Tōka Fushimi)
- Lady Jewelpet (2014) (Momona Father)
- Durarara!!x2 Ten (2015) (Kisuke Adabashi)
- Gangsta. (2015) (Diego Montez)
- Ghost in the Shell: Arise – Alternative Architecture (2015) (Paz)
- Mr. Osomatsu (2015) (Dekapan)
- One-Punch Man (2015) (Drive Knight)
- Punch Line (2015) (Manbu Ishigata)
- The Asterisk War (2016) (Nicolas Enfield)
- B-PROJECT～Kodō＊Ambitious～ (2016) (Ninomiya)
- Cerberus (2016) (Palpa)
- March Comes in like a Lion (2016) (Hanaoka)
- Mob Psycho 100 (2016) (Kyaku)
- Servamp (2016) (Tōru Shirota)
- Time Bokan 24 (2016) (MeKabuton (eps.1-10), Suzumupeaker (ep.4), Kamakirippa (ep.7))
- ACCA: 13-Territory Inspection Dept. (2017) (Owl)
- Blood Blockade Battlefront & Beyond (2017) (Medivac Helicopter Pilot)
- Code:Realize – Guardian of Rebirth (2017) (Rempart Leonhardt)
- Sagrada Reset (2017) (Shintarō Tsushima)
- Banana Fish (2018) (Charlie Dickenson)
- Dakaichi (2018) (Jiro Hasegawa)
- Double Decker! Doug & Kirill (2018) (Narrator)
- Holmes of Kyoto (2018) (Takeshi Yagashira)
- Steins;Gate 0 (2018) (Alexis Leskinen)
- Boogiepop and Others (2019) (Spooky E)
- The Magnificent Kotobuki (2019) (Johnny)
- One-Punch Man 2 (2019) (Drive Knight)
- Star Twinkle PreCure (2019) (Bakenyan, Hakkenyan)
- YU-NO: A Girl Who Chants Love at the Bound of this World (2019) (Atsushi Hōjō)
- Vinland Saga (2019-present) (Leif Ericson)
- No Guns Life (2019) (Hugh Cunningham)
- ID – Invaded (2020) (Hitoshi Sonoda)
- The House Spirit Tatami-chan (2020) (Pom Poko Maru)
- Project Scard: Scar on the Praeter (2020) (Morrigan Sakiyo)
- Sonny Boy (2021) (Cap)
- Banished from the Hero's Party (2021) (Stormthunder)
- Mushoku Tensei Part 2 (2021-present) (Geese Nukadia)
- Ranking of Kings (2021) (Bebin)
- Tokyo 24th Ward (2022) (Hiroki Shirakaba)
- Summer Time Rendering (2022) (Tetsu Totsumura)
- Lycoris Recoil (2022) (Shinji Yoshimatsu)
- Chainsaw Man (2022) (Aki's father)
- Bleach: Thousand-Year Blood War (2022-2024) (Ōetsu Nimaiya)
- The Little Lies We All Tell (2022) (Brian-sensei)
- The Fire Hunter (2023) (Enzen)
- Frieren (2023-present) (Eisen)
- One Piece (2023) (Kurouma/Tensei)
- A Salad Bowl of Eccentrics (2024) (Isao Kusanagi)
- Suicide Squad Isekai (2024) (Ratcatcher)
- Orb: On the Movements of the Earth (2024-2025) (Damian)
- Yakuza Fiancé: Raise wa Tanin ga Ii (2024) (Renji Somei)
- Sword of the Demon Hunter: Kijin Gentōshō (2025) (Kihei restaurant owner)
- Catch Me at the Ballpark! (2025) (Nakaizumi)
- I'm the Evil Lord of an Intergalactic Empire! (2025) (Brian Beaumont)
- Gachiakuta (2025) (Gnomulas Ridd)
- With You and the Rain (2025) (Tatsuo)
- Lazarus (2025) (Kobayashi)^{Ep. 2 credits}
- Let's Go Karaoke! (2025) (Alien)
- Ganglion (2025) (Kenji Isobe)
- Sentenced to Be a Hero (2026) (Norgalle Senridge)
- The Darwin Incident (2026) (Philip Graham)
- High School! Kimengumi (2026) (Takuseki Ichidō)
- Oshi no Ko Season 3 (2026) (Tetsu Urushibara)
- Liar Game (2026) (Mitsuo Tanimura)
- Nippon Sangoku (2026) (Yoshinaga Sato)
- Witch Hat Atelier (2026) (Richeh's former master)
- Black Torch (2026) (Rago)
- The Ghost in the Shell (2026) (Garbageman A)
- The Villager of Level 999 (2026) (Militaria Remote)
- The Elusive Samurai (2026) (Hōjō Yasuie)
- Akane-banashi (2027) (Hassho Tsubakiya)

=== OVA ===
- Red Garden (2007) (Neel)
- Bus Gamer (2008) (Santa)
- Ghost in the Shell: Arise (2014–15) (Paz)
- Mobile Suit Gundam: The Witch from Mercury Prologue (2022) (Kenanji Avery)

=== Anime films ===
- Japan, Our Homeland (2006) (Mr. Akiyama)
- Ghost in the Shell: The New Movie (2015) (Paz)
- Mobile Suit Gundam Thunderbolt: Bandit Flower (2017) (Sebastian Morse)
- Batman Ninja (2018) (Eian)
- Mr. Osomatsu: The Movie (2019) (Dekapan)
- Fate/stay night: Heaven's Feel III. spring song (2020) (Nagato Tohsaka)
- Mobile Suit Gundam: Cucuruz Doan's Island (2022) (Wald Ren)
- Mr. Osomatsu: Hipipo-Zoku to Kagayaku Kajitsu (2022) (Dekapan)
- Laid-Back Camp Movie (2022) (Shirakawa)
- Make a Girl (2025) (Shōichi Takamine)

=== Video games ===
- Saikin Koi Shiteru? (2009) (Takumi Shindō)
- Super Street Fighter IV (2010) (Policeman)
- JoJo's Bizarre Adventure: All Star Battle (2013) (Robert E.O. Speedwagon)
- JoJo's Bizarre Adventure: Eyes of Heaven (2015) (Robert E.O. Speedwagon)
- NORN9 (2015) (Motohisa Tōya)
- Hyperdimension Neptunia (CFW Trick)
- Armored Core Last Raven (Crow)
- Bloodborne (Blood Minister)
- Bleach: Brave Souls (Ōetsu Nimaiya)
- 13 Sentinels: Aegis Rim (Juro Izumi (adult), Kyuta Shiba, Fluffy)
- Stranger of Paradise: Final Fantasy Origin (2022) (Astos)
- JoJo's Bizarre Adventure: All Star Battle R (2022) (Robert E.O. Speedwagon)
- Anonymous;Code (2022) (Kaoru Samezu)
- Xenoblade Chronicles 3 (2022) (Consul D)
- Street Fighter 6 (2023) (Retsu)
- Genshin Impact (2025) as Hroptatyr

=== Tokusatsu ===
- Kamen Rider Gaim (2014) (Dyudyuonshu (ep. 33, 40))
- Uchu Sentai Kyuranger (2017) (Shaidos (ep. 17))

=== Dubbing ===
==== Live-action ====
- About Schmidt (Ray Nichols (Len Cariou))
- The Ballad of Buster Scruggs (Buster Scruggs (Tim Blake Nelson))
- Blade Runner 2049 (Coco (David Dastmalchian))
- Dune (Piter De Vries (David Dastmalchian))
- The French Dispatch (Julien Cadazio (Adrien Brody), Arthur Howitzer Jr. (Bill Murray))
- Fright Night (Jay Dee (Chris Sarandon))
- Game of Thrones (Petyr Baelish (Aidan Gillen), Maester Luwin (Donald Sumpter))
- Hostel (Josh (Derek Richardson))
- IF (Andromedus III (Matthew Rhys))
- Independence Day: Resurgence (Commander Jiang (Chin Han))
- The Ipcress File (Major Dalby (Tom Hollander))
- Jurassic World (2025 The Cinema edition) (Scott Mitchell (Andy Buckley))
- The King's Man (King George, Kaiser Wilhelm and Tsar Nicholas (Tom Hollander))
- Limitless (FBI Special Agent Spelman Boyle (Hill Harper))
- The Mandalorian and Grogu (Hutt sibling (N/A))
- Men in Black: International (Agent C (Rafe Spall))
- Midway (Lieutenant Clarence Earle Dickinson (Luke Kleintank))
- Mutant World (Marcus King (Kim Coates))
- Peacemaker (Clemson Murn (Chukwudi Iwuji))
- Professor Marston and the Wonder Women (William Moulton Marston (Luke Evans))
- The Shape of Water (Robert Hoffstetler / Dimitri Mosenkov (Michael Stuhlbarg))
- Six Feet Under (Federico (Freddy Rodriguez))
- Skyscraper (Zhao Long Ji (Chin Han))
- The Social Network (Bill Gates (Steve Sires))
- Straight Outta Compton (Jerry Heller (Paul Giamatti))
- Suburbicon (Bud Cooper (Oscar Isaac))
- S.W.A.T. (Commander Robert Hicks (Patrick St. Esprit))
- Those Who Wish Me Dead (Jack (Aidan Gillen))
- The Twilight Zone (Samir Wassan (Kumail Nanjiani))
- Watchmen (Wade Tillman / Looking Glass (Tim Blake Nelson))
- The Wedding Ringer (Lurch / Garvey (Jorge Garcia))
- Whiskey Cavalier (Ray Prince (Josh Hopkins))
- Yogi Bear (Chief of Staff (Nate Corddry))

==== Animation ====
- Calamity, a Childhood of Martha Jane Cannary (Ethan)
- Hazbin Hotel (Sir Pentious, Adam)
- Helluva Boss (Fizzarolli)
- Jellystone! (Huckleberry Hound)
- Ralph Breaks the Internet (J.P. Spamley)
- Spider-Man: Across the Spider-Verse (George Stacy)
- The SpongeBob Movie: Sponge Out of Water and The SpongeBob Movie: Sponge on The Run (Squidward Tentacles)
- SpongeBob SquarePants (Squidward Tentacles (season 9-present), Man Ray (season 9-present), Patchy the Pirate (season 10-present), Perch Perkins (season 9-present), Old Man Jenkins (season 9-present) and Bubble Bass (season 10+))
- Transformers One (Zeta Prime)
