= Space Dandy =

2014 Japanese anime series

- Promotional image for the anime series featuring Meow, Dandy and QT
- スペース☆ダンディ
- Genre: Comedy; Space opera
- Created by: Bones
- Written by: Shinichirō Watanabe; Dai Satō; Kimiko Ueno; Ichirō Ōkōchi; Keiko Nobumoto; Toh EnJoe; Masaaki Yuasa; Hayashi Mori; Kiyotaka Oshiyama
- Directed by: Shinichirō Watanabe (chief); Shingo Natsume
- Music by: Season 1: Taku Takahashi; Hiroyuki Namba (#1, 3–4, 7–10, 12); KenKen (#1–2, 6, 9, 11–12); Hiroshi Kawanabe (#1–3, 5, 7–8); Tucker (#1–4, 6, 9, 13); Mountain Mocha Kilimanjaro (#1–5, 7, 10, 12); Kensuke Ushio (#2, 6–7, 11); Shutoku Mukai (#2, 4–5, 7, 12); Noriyoshi Sasanuma (#3, 6, 9); mito (#3–4, 8, 10–11, 13); Makura Izumi (#5); mabanua (#5); Tarō Umebayashi (#5, 7, 10); JUNK FUJIYAMA (#6); Latin Quarter (#6); Fujimaru Yoshino (#6, 10); Yasuyuki Okamura (#6, 9, 12); ZEN-LA-ROCK (#7); Grooveman Spot (#7); Pecombo (#7); Dokaka (#9); pomodorosa (#12); Luvraw&BTB (#13); Rick Wade (#13); Season 2: Taku Takahashi (#14–17, 19–20, 22–24, 26); Hiroshi Kawanabe (#14, 18, 22); Fujimaru Yoshino (#14, 17, 19, 23); Shutoku Mukai (#14, 17, 20, 23); Mountain Mocha Kilimanjaro (#14, 16, 18, 20, 25); Hiroyuki Namba (#14, 20, 22–23, 25–26); Tucker (#15–16, 19, 22–24); Yasuyuki Okamura (#15, 22); Kensuke Ushio (#15, 22, 24); Latin Quarter (#16, 19–20); Yoko Kanno (#16, 19–20, 22); Tarō Umebayashi (#17–18, 21, 24); Tomonori Hayashibe (#17, 24); KenKen (#18, 20, 25–26); Seiichi Nagai (#19, 23); Ogre You Asshole (#21); Kōichirō Tashiro (#21); DORIAN (#22); ZEN-LA-ROCK (#22, 26); mito (#26)
- Country of origin: Japan
- Original language: Japanese
- No. of seasons: 2
- No. of episodes: 26 (list of episodes)

Production
- Producers: Masahiko Minami; Motoki Mukaichi; Hirofumi Inagaki; Hirotsugu Ogisu; Yukako Inoue; Yukihiro Itō
- Production companies: Bones; Bandai Visual; Bandai Namco Games; Hakuhodo DY Media Partners; FlyingDog; BS Fuji

Original release
- Network: Tokyo MX, TVO, TVA, BS Fuji, AT-X (JP); Adult Swim (US)
- Release: January 4 – September 28, 2014

Related
- Manga
- Written by: Masafumi Harada
- Illustrated by: Park Sung-woo; Red Ice
- Published by: Square Enix
- English publisher: NA: Yen Press
- Magazine: Young Gangan
- Original run: December 20, 2013 – October 3, 2014
- Volumes: 2
- Video game

Space Galaga
- Developer: Bandai Namco Games
- Publisher: Bandai Namco Games
- Genre: Fixed shooter
- Platform: Android, iOS
- Released: Android: JP: January 24, 2014; iOS: JP: February 6, 2014

Space Dandy, stylized as Space☆Dandy (Japanese: スペース☆ダンディ, Hepburn: Supēsu Dandi), is a 2014 Japanese comic science fiction anime television series produced by Bones. The series follows the misadventures of Dandy, an alien hunter who is "a dandy guy in space", in search for undiscovered and rare aliens with his robot assistant QT and his feline-like friend named Meow.

The anime has been licensed by Funimation in North America, Madman Entertainment in Australia and by Anime Limited in the United Kingdom. The series first aired in the United States on January 4, 2014, at 11:30 p.m. ET/PT on Adult Swim's Toonami programming block. The series began airing in Japan on Tokyo MX at 11 p.m. JST on January 5, 2014, followed by TV Osaka, TV Aichi, BS Fuji and AT-X. The series is simulcasted in South East Asia at the same time as Japan on Animax Asia. The series has also been broadcast in Australia on SBS 2 since October 3, 2015. Following Sony's acquisition of Crunchyroll, the series was moved to Crunchyroll.

A manga adaptation ran in Square Enix's Young Gangan magazine from December 20, 2013, to October 3, 2014. The manga is licensed in English by Yen Press. The first season aired from January to March 2014, and the second season aired from July to September 2014.

== Plot ==
The space opera follows the misadventures of Dandy, an alien bounty hunter who is "a dandy guy in space", in search for undiscovered and rare aliens with his robot assistant QT and his feline friend named Meow. Dandy is unaware that he is being pursued by Dr. Gel of the Gogol Empire.

The series has loose continuity, with several episodes featuring the main protagonists and antagonists dying, getting turned into zombies, or getting trapped in different dimensions for periods of time, only for them to show up as normal in the next episode. There are also many references to older science fiction, music, anime and Internet culture.

== Characters ==
The crew of the Aloha Oe. From left to right: Dandy, Meow, and QT.

Dandy (ダンディ, Dandi)
Voiced by: Junichi Suwabe (Japanese); Ian Sinclair (English)
Dandy is an easygoing and forgetful alien hunter with a pompadour hairstyle whose job is to discover new alien life forms across the galaxy and have them registered with the Space Alien Registration Center. He is the captain of the Aloha Oe (アロハオエ号, Arohaoe-gō), his personal spaceship. The cockpit of the Aloha Oe can split off into an escape pod dubbed the Little Aloha (リトルアロハ, Ritoru Aroha) and it displays the ability to transform into a robot called the "Hawaii Yankee" (ハワヤンキー, Hawayankī). Dandy regularly visits an intergalactic breastaurant known as "BooBies" (ブービーズ, Būbīzu) where he indulges in his posterior fetish and dreams of someday buying out the franchise. Dandy is also shown to have many hidden talents, including being a highly skilled surfer capable of surfing on abstract concepts such as time and having a deep understanding of physics, such as figuring that when a person "warps" on ships, they are actually moving their consciousness to a universe that is slightly further ahead in the same timeline rather than moving to a different area of the same universe. Unbeknownst to him, Dandy is targeted by the Gogol Empire due to his connection to a reality-defying element called pyonium. Ultimately, after the universe comes to an end, Dandy is revealed to be, unbeknownst to even himself, an omnipresent figure who exists in any and all hypothetical timelines (with his various skillsets belonging to other previous Dandies). Dandy is then told by the current God that the nature of his existence means that he is to replace him as the god of the new multiverse, an order which Dandy turns down (because as a bodyless god, he wouldn't be able to go to BooBies), leaving the current universe with the words "Stay dandy, baby." The series ends where it began (with Dandy and QT heading to BooBies, where they will meet Meow for the first time), except Dandy has retained his memories from the previous multiverse. Dandy then wonders if his many adventures have changed him, and asks himself if he is still the same person that he once was.
QT
Voiced by: Uki Satake (Japanese); Alison Viktorin (English)
A member of Dandy's crew, a robot that resembles and also operates as a vacuum cleaner. QT boasts being more intelligent and competent than its fellow crewmates, but its usefulness is stymied by problems caused by its outdated hardware such as memory shortages and battery outages. Despite being feminine in voice and some of its mannerisms, QT is referred to as a male by Dandy and Meow on several occasions and seems to self-identify as such. It is capable of feeling a wide range of emotions, but for the most part sees them as confusing, extraneous, and unnecessary for computing. QT is also obsessed with everything being peaceful and orderly, and as a result is shown to be an avid fisher due to the zen-like nature of it. QT is also shown to be capable of feeling love, having fallen in love with a sentient coffee making robot in the season one finale, but gave up after it realized the robot was itself in love with the store's sentient cash register, who QT was forced to fight after the register turned out to be part of an anti-human extremist terror organization. QT is then shown drinking a cup of coffee in remembrance of its lost love. QT appears with Dandy in the new universe, unaware of the adventures that they have yet to undertake and acting puzzled by Dandy's sudden introspection.
Meow (ミャウ, Myau)
Voiced by: Hiroyuki Yoshino (Japanese); Joel McDonald (English)
A dimwitted cat-like Betelgeusian (ベテルギウス星人, Beterugiusu-seijin) who is brought aboard the Aloha Oe after Dandy and QT mistake him for a new species of alien. His real name is Me#$%* (pronounced Merowmreowreow), and is called Mew by his friends back at home. His name, "Meow", is given to him by Dandy as neither he nor QT could comprehend his real name. Aside from lounging around the Aloha Oe, he aids Dandy by giving him advice on where to find rare aliens through social media, to varying degrees of success. Meow also displays many earth cat-like tendencies, such as an aversion to dogs, spending an entire episode angrily shunning a dog-like alien, before breaking down in tears when she died after he realized that she still liked him despite his spiteful attitude towards her. Meow comes from a family lineage of metalworkers, and was set to inherit the family company before leaving Betelgeuse to become an alien hunter due to his frustration at living a monotonous existence, but after spending time there with Dandy and QT while caught in a timeloop, Meow learns to appreciate his home and family.
Dr. Gel (ゲル博士, Geru-hakase)
Voiced by: Unshō Ishizuka (Japanese); J. Michael Tatum (English)
A gorilla-like scientist working for the Gogol Empire, Dr. Gel endlessly pursues Dandy from his spaceship, which resembles the head of the Statue of Liberty with a ball gag in her mouth that can attach to a robot body. However, despite getting close to capturing Dandy on some occasions, Gel always ends up failing in a humiliating fashion or going down with his ship. Once Gel captured Dandy, he ends being fatally wounded by Bea and lives long enough to see the universe undone. His character resembles Jet Black from Cowboy Bebop (with whom he shares his Japanese voice actor) and Dr. Gori from Spectreman.
Bea (ビー, Bī)
Voiced by: Kosuke Hatakeyama (Japanese); Micah Solusod (English)
Dr. Gel's right-hand assistant, a diminutive alien whose head resembles an eggplant. In reality, Bea is actually an agent of the Jaicro Empire who spied on the Gogol Empire until he betrays both factions once Dandy is captured with the intention to become a god. However, Bea gets crushed to death by Gel after Bea fatally shot him.
Admiral Perry (ペリー提督, Perī-teitoku)
Voiced by: Banjō Ginga (Japanese); Kent Williams (English)
The ruler of the Gogol Empire (ゴーゴル帝国, Gōgoru Teikoku), which is at war with the Jaicro Empire for control of the universe. He sends Dr. Gel to capture Dandy, claiming he is the key to the future of the universe. His public appearance is that of a skull-headed figure with miniature "planets" orbiting around his head while there is a cosmos within his cloak, it is a hologram that conceals his true appearance: a middle aged humanoid in a business suit.
Honey (ハニー, Hanī)
Voiced by: Yurin (Japanese); Alexis Tipton (English)
A blonde-haired "blockhead" whose actual name is Lady Nobra and is half-Cloudian. Working as a waitress, or "Breast" (ブレスト, Buresuto), at the BooBies restaurant, or rather "Breastaurant" (ブレストラン, buresutoran), Honey seems to enjoy the Aloha Oe crew's usual visits all the time. While captured by Dr. Gel, Honey's lineage is revealed while Dandy attempted to go after her older half-brother Gentle Nobra, who in turn launched an attack on Gel's ship that destroyed his cloud while she escaped harm in midst the chaos similar of the same name of honey cutey.
Scarlet (スカーレット, Sukāretto)
Voiced by: Houko Kuwashima (Japanese); Colleen Clinkenbeard (English)
A collected, no nonsense inspector at the space alien registration center tasked with evaluating the aliens brought by Dandy and paying him accordingly when he brings her a worthy specimen. She is also a skilled fighter and can easily see through Dandy's tricks when he attempts to deceive her. She also has shown romantic interest in Dandy on more than one occasion throughout the series, along with a history of failed romances that include her stalker ex-boyfriend Dolph.
Johnny (ジョニー, Jonī)
Voiced by: Hiroshi Kamiya (Japanese); Johnny Yong Bosch (English)
Johnny is the commander of the Jaicro Empire, a rival of the Gogol Empire. Also revealed to be an aspiring musician, concealing his identity from them, Johnny once formed a rock band with the Aloha Oe crew called the "Dropkix." Though their band was short lived and remembered as a one-hit wonder, Johnny's responsibility to the Dropkix indirectly lead to a cessation of hostilities between the two empires. When news of Dandy's capture reaches him, Johnny leads an attack on the Gogol Empire before being erased along with the universe.
Professor Duran (デュラン博士, Duran-hakase)
Voiced by: Iemasa Kayumi (Japanese); Jeremy Schwartz (English)
Professor Duran is a Jaicro imperial scientist who specializes in researching Pyonium energy. He was brought before the court during Dandy's trial when he found evidence of the supposed murder was revealed to have a Pyonium influence, he realizes that Dandy was more than he appeared and reported his capture to Johnny.
Narrator
Voiced by: Masaaki Yajima (Japanese); R. Bruce Elliott (English)
The omnipotent and omniscient being that narrates the show, which is revealed in the final episode to be "God". The Narrator observed the crew's misadventures, sometimes telepathically interacting with the characters. In the finale, beginning to fade away as the universe is undone, the Narrator attempted to have Dandy replace him as the God of the new universe, but is shocked when Dandy refuses before completely fading from existence.

== Production ==
The anime is directed by Shingo Natsume, with Shinichirō Watanabe serving as general director, and produced by Bones. The anime began airing on Adult Swim's Toonami programming block in the United States on January 4, 2014, one day before its Japanese premiere on Tokyo MX on January 5. The series' opening theme is "Viva Namida" (ビバナミダ, Biba Namida; "Viva Tears") performed by Yasuyuki Okamura and the ending theme is "X-Jigen e Yōkoso" (X次元へようこそ, Ekkusu Jigen e Yōkoso; "Welcome to the Xth Dimension") performed by Etsuko Yakushimaru.

The Adult Swim broadcasts initially used instrumental tracks by Mountain Mocha Kilimanjaro for these sequences due to licensing issues, but the eighth episode onward featured "Viva Namida", as have subsequent rebroadcasts of the first seven episodes. The English version is produced by Funimation in Fort Worth, Texas, using its local acting talent pool. The series' ADR voice directors include Zach Bolton and Joel McDonald. The series is also simulcasted at the same time as Japan by Animax Asia in South East Asia with both Japanese and English audio.

== Other media ==
=== Manga ===
A manga adaptation began serialization in Square Enix's Young Gangan magazine on December 20, 2013. The first tankōbon volume was released on March 25, 2014. Yen Press licensed the series for release in North America, with the first volume released on June 28, 2016, and the second volume released on September 27, 2016.

=== Video game ===
A video game Space Galaga (based on the arcade game Galaga) was released on Android on January 24, 2014, and on iOS on February 6, 2014.

== Reception ==
The series received generally positive reviews. Writer Alasdair Wilkins of the A.V. Club gave Space Dandy a B+, stating: "This is a proudly frivolous show, one that delights in its juvenile sense of humor and sneers at the very idea of an ongoing storyline. The show is a surreal throwback to a bygone era of science fiction, like an old Flash Gordon serial or a wacky Superman comic from the Silver Age – if the heroic protagonist were obsessed with butts and breasts. That doesn't mean Space Dandy is a disappointment." Paul and Caroline Daley of Three If By Space wrote, "Dandy himself both in look and personality, combines Elvis Presley, Zapp Brannigan, and Han Solo. While Dandy may come off inept or silly at times, he often does possess the skill needed to save the day (or at least their skins). This makes him very watchable because you never know which Dandy you'll get." and "Space Dandy feels like a throw-back. No, not like throw it back, like something out of another time. The bright colors, the music, and especially the main character, the titular Space Dandy, all remind me of a time when adventures didn't have to make total sense and political correctness wasn't really a thing yet."

Brandon Postal of Capsule Computers gave Space Dandy Season 1 Blu-ray a 7.5 rating and wrote, "Space Dandy is a fun romp but not exceptionally so. It's an enjoyable look at Japanese comedic portrayals of different science fiction tropes and styles, but ultimately only good for laughs. If you're looking for a hard sci-fi series, or even a comedy with a strong narrative, then you might want to look somewhere else. Funimation has done a good job with the dub, making this enjoyable for a wide range of anime fans. I enjoyed some of the characterizations and the takes on various science fiction tropes. I would recommend giving this a watch as long as you don't take it seriously." Laurent Backman of Slug Magazine wrote in a Space Dandy Season 2 DVD Review, "Space Dandy is just such a show. It's over the top, at times crass, nonsensical, and seeing as it comes from the creative team behind Cowboy Bebop, not without its fair share of great music." and "There's not much over-arching narrative for the season, and episodes are their own self-contained storylets, but the formula works perfectly, letting Space Dandy mess around with a bunch of different ideas while never straying too far from its strong comedy backbone."
