= Shingo Natsume =

Japanese animator

- 夏目真悟
- Born: September 26, 1980 (age 45); Aomori Prefecture
- Occupation: Anime director
- Years active: 2003–present
- Known for: Space Dandy; One-Punch Man; Sonny Boy

Shingo Natsume (Japanese: 夏目真悟, Hepburn: Natsume Shingo; born September 26, 1980) is a Japanese anime director and animator. He started working in 2003 and after working on Fullmetal Alchemist: Brotherhood in 2009, he was put in charge of directing his first TV series with Space Dandy in 2014.

== Biography ==
Shingo Natsume was born in Aomori Prefecture on September 26, 1980. He began working as an animator in 2003 and in 2009 he was put in charge of key animation for Fullmetal Alchemist: Brotherhood. Following the series' conclusion, he worked on The Tatami Galaxy a year later and eventually was given his first directorial role in a TV series with Space Dandy in 2014. Natsume then directed the first season of One-Punch Man, ACCA: 13-Territory Inspection Dept., and Boogiepop and Others in 2015, 2017, and 2019 respectively. In 2021, he was put in charge of creating an original anime TV series, Sonny Boy. At the 2022 Crunchyroll Anime Awards, Sonny Boy was nominated for anime of the year, and Natsume was also nominated for best director.

== Filmography ==
| Year | Title | Role | Ref. |
|---|---|---|---|
| 2012 | Hori-san to Miyamura-kun | Episode director (episode 1) | |
| 2014 | Space Dandy | Director | |
| 2015 | One-Punch Man | Director | |
| 2017 | ACCA: 13-Territory Inspection Dept. | Director | |
| 2017 | The Night Is Short, Walk On Girl | Storyboards | |
| 2019 | Boogiepop and Others | Director | |
| 2021 | Sonny Boy | Director & creator | |
| 2022 | Tatami Time Machine Blues | Director | |
| 2027 | Ghost | Director & screenwriter | |
