= The Stars Our Destination =

- 3 Body Problem episode
- Episode no.: Season 1 Episode 6
- Directed by: Minkie Spiro
- Written by: Alexander Woo
- Cinematography by: Martin Ahlgren
- Editing by: Anna Hauger
- Original air date: March 21, 2024
- Running time: 48 minutes

Guest appearances
- CCH Pounder as Secretary General Lilian Joseph; Gerard Monaco as Collins; Hélène Vivies as Lecompte; Stephen Rahman-Hughes as Anwar Suleiman; Bea Svistunenko as Laeticia; Bilal Hasna as Edgar; Dustin Demri-Burns as Ted; Maryam Moshiri as BBC Anchorwoman; Minaree Jayasena as One Earth Volunteer; Sagar Arya as One Earth Official

Episode chronology
← Previous "Judgment Day"	Next → "Only Advance"

"The Stars Our Destination" is the sixth episode of the American science fiction television series 3 Body Problem, based on the Chinese novel series Remembrance of Earth's Past by Liu Cixin. The episode was written by series co-creator Alexander Woo, and directed by Minkie Spiro. It was released on Netflix on March 21, 2024, alongside the rest of the season.

The series follows Ye Wenjie, an astrophysicist who sees her father beaten to death during a struggle session in the Chinese Cultural Revolution, who is conscripted by the military. Due to her scientific background, she is sent to a secret military base in a remote region. Her decision at the base to respond to contact from an alien civilization, telling it that humanity can no longer save itself and that she will help the aliens invade Earth, affects a group of scientists in the present day, forcing them to confront humanity's greatest threat. In the episode, the world falls into a panic after the "Eye in the Sky Event".

The episode received generally positive reviews from critics, who praised the performances but criticizing the pacing.

== Plot ==
The "Eye in the Sky Event" causes worldwide panic, including riots and rampant suicides. Clarence (Benedict Wong) gets Jin (Jess Hong) to visit Ye Wenjie (Rosalind Chao), confronting her over her actions. Ye Wenjie now realizes the true intent of the San-Ti, but is still willing to let them conquer the world.

Wade (Liam Cunningham) and the Planetary Defense Council (PDC) gather a group of experts to discuss how to intercept the San-Ti fleet. It is established that if a probe were to reach at least 1% light speed, it would intercept the incoming ships in 200 years, giving Earth 200 years' advance knowledge of the fleet's capabilities. Jin proposes the Staircase Project, using a thousand nuclear bombs as propulsion sources for a probe with radiation sails. Wade approves the idea, and starts assembling his team. He also approves Raj's (Saamer Usmani) request to join the operation.

Auggie (Eiza González) has been staying with Saul (Jovan Adepo), although she has faced a crisis after the use of nanofibers against the Judgment Day. (Note: as shown in "Judgment Day") When Jin announces her plans to help, Auggie tells her to drop out. Earth's wealthiest contribute funds by spending millions each to purchase "ownership rights" to a star of their choice. Auggie argues that the funds should be used to help people today, not to save them in the future.

Will (Alex Sharp) hallucinates and reflects on his unrequited love towards Jin. He decides to share his feelings before cancer kills him, but relents when he finds her with Raj. Clarence visits Ye Wenjie, asking her why her daughter Vera killed herself. She reveals that Vera discovered her dealings with the San-Ti through Ye Wenjie's correspondence with Evans, and could not live with that. Clarence decides to release her, but has an officer continue following her. As Auggie decides to join Jin in her mission, Will visits The Stars our Destination Foundation to spend £19.5 million of his inheritance from Jack, purchasing the star DX3906 for Jin.

== Production ==
=== Development ===
The episode was written by series co-creator Alexander Woo, and directed by Minkie Spiro. It marked Woo's third writing credit, and Spiro's third directing credit.

=== Writing ===
According to D. B. Weiss, the name of The Stars Our Destination Foundation is taken from the novel The Stars My Destination, although it does not have any similarity in themes nor story. He also said, "The war effort is going to be long and hard and multigenerational. And as with any war effort, it's going to be immensely expensive".

== Release ==
The episode, along with the rest of the season, premiered on March 21, 2024, on Netflix. It was originally set to premiere in January 2024.

== Critical reception ==
"The Stars Our Destination" received generally positive reviews from critics. Ben Rosenstock of Vulture gave the episode a 4 star rating out of 5 and wrote, "After a few heavily plot-driven episodes focused on getting straight to what the hell is happening, “The Stars Our Destination” feels like a necessary cooldown. It's a proper aftermath episode, slowing down to evaluate where everyone's at psychologically, but also a pivot point to set up the final two episodes of this season."

Johnny Loftus of Decider wrote, "In 3 Body Problem, humanity's reaction to the revelation that aliens are real, watching us, and en route to Earth feels on point with our current reality." Dan Selcke gave the episode a "B" grade and wrote, "A good TV show has big crescendos and quieter, subtle trills. You need both to make a symphony. Episode 5 was a crescendo where a network of microfibers chopped up a ship and everyone on board in spectacular fashion. "The Stars Our Destination" is a quiet moment."

Sean T. Collins of The New York Times wrote, "It had to let up at some point. After five escalating episodes in which each ending was more spectacularly grim than the last, 3 Body Problem took its foot off the gas for its sixth outing. It's hard to begrudge an eight-episode literary adaptation a bit of breathing room." Jerrica Tisdale of Telltale TV wrote, "These episodes shift the story from finding out the problem to solving it. But can a solution exist in a world such as ours? 3 Body Problem excels at interesting storylines with relevancy to current events and a clear perspective. The familiarity of the world makes it easy to connect to it." Greg Wheeler of Review Geek gave the episode a 2 star rating out of 5 and wrote, "Man, if there was ever an accurate title for an episode – this is not it. The real title should have been “filler”. There's absolutely nothing of note within this episode beyond some messaging about class wars. Beyond that, there's really not a whole lot of plot development."
