= Countdown (3 Body Problem) =

- 3 Body Problem episode
- Episode no.: Season 1 Episode 1
- Directed by: Derek Tsang
- Written by: David Benioff; D. B. Weiss; Alexander Woo
- Cinematography by: Jonathan Freeman; Richard Donnelly
- Editing by: Katie Weiland
- Original air date: March 21, 2024
- Running time: 61 minutes

Guest appearances
- Yu Guming as Yang Weining; Gerard Monaco as Collins; Vedette Lim as Vera Ye; Deng Qiaozhi as Lei Zhicheng; Lan Xiya as Tang Hongjing; Sun Yan as Commander Song; Yang Hewen as Bai Mulin; Perry Yung as Ye Zhetai; Li Fengxu as Shao Lin; Jeanne Yuan as Teng Lihua; Steven H. Li as Political Instructor Wei; Wang Xuedong as Male Red Guard; Guy Burnet as Rufus; Emily Kimball as Poppy; Stephanie Tarling as Karaoke Singer; Benjamin Jia as Lead Operator; James Chu as Professor; Tao Deng as Computer Scientist #1; Tao Guo as Computer Scientist #2; Yin Wang as Red Guard Student

Episode chronology
← Previous —	Next → "Red Coast"

"Countdown" is the series premiere of the American science fiction television series 3 Body Problem, based on the Chinese novel series Remembrance of Earth's Past by Liu Cixin. The episode was written by series developers David Benioff, D. B. Weiss, and Alexander Woo, and directed by co-executive producer Derek Tsang. It was released on Netflix on March 21, 2024, alongside the rest of the season.

The series follows Ye Wenjie, an astrophysicist who sees her father beaten to death during a struggle session in the Chinese Cultural Revolution, who is conscripted by the military. Due to her scientific background, she is sent to a secret military base in a remote region. Her decision at the base to respond to contact from an alien civilization, telling it that humanity can no longer save itself and that she will help the aliens invade Earth, affects a group of scientists in the present day, forcing them to confront humanity's greatest threat.

The series premiere received positive reviews from critics, who praised its premise and performances, although some criticized the pacing.

== Plot ==
=== 1966 ===
At Tsinghua University in Beijing, a struggle session is held during the Cultural Revolution. A man, Ye Zhetai (Perry Yung), is brought to be executed for promoting different ideologies. His daughter, Ye Wenjie (Zine Tseng), helplessly watches her father being brutally beaten to death.

=== 1967 ===
In Inner Mongolia, Ye Wenjie has been sent to a work camp. She is approached by Bai Mulin (Yang Hewen), who gives her a copy of Silent Spring. When the guards discover the copy, Ye Wenjie does not reveal Mulin's involvement. Wenjie is offered a plea deal to testify against her father's former colleagues for thought crimes and complete additional political education, but declines. She is later taken to a remote station with a large radio telescope dish, where she is offered to work on the Red Coast Base project, and she willingly accepts to renounce her life to commit to the project, believing it to be an experimental weapons program. After a few months, she witnesses the first test, which involves flocks of birds flying to the telescope and dying. She concludes that the program does not involve experimental weapons, and her officer reveals that they are trying to reach off-world contact.

=== 2024 ===
In London, Strategic Intelligence Agency investigator Clarence Shi (Benedict Wong) investigates the suicide of Dr. Sadiq Mohammed, who left a bloodied countdown on his walls and had his eyes removed. At a particle accelerator in University of Oxford, Dr. Saul Durand (Jovan Adepo) talks with his boss, Vera Ye (Vedette Lim), over a new discovery that could prove the physics of the past 60 years were all incorrect. Afterwards, she commits suicide by jumping into the facility's Cherenkov detector.

Vera's funeral is attended by former physics students, Saul, Augustina "Auggie" Salazar (Eiza González), Jack Rooney (John Bradley), Jin Cheng (Jess Hong), and Will Downing (Alex Sharp). Clarence follows them, and later also follows Mike Evans (Jonathan Pryce), who leaves in a helicopter. At a bar, the former students (the "Oxford Five") talk about Vera's actions, all of them remarking how recent experiments have stopped making sense. Auggie has been seeing a recurrent countdown in her field of vision and is told by a woman (Marlo Kelly) to drop her nanofiber research to stop the countdown, warning her of dire consequences should the countdown reach zero.

Clarence is pressured by his boss, Thomas Wade (Liam Cunningham), into solving the recent cases of scientists committing suicides. He eventually realizes that several of them possessed an advanced virtual reality gaming headset, and wonders if the "Oxford Five" are related to the cases. Jin visits Vera's mother, Ye Wenjie (Rosalind Chao), and is given a similar virtual reality gaming headset that appears to belong to Vera. She puts it on to discover a super immersive world with fluctuating solar patterns, the goal being to discover an explanation for its movements and a solution to the catastrophic events that destroy the world's civilisations. At night, Auggie is joined by Saul to see the sky at midnight. At midnight, the sky suddenly starts "winking" with the stars in the sky all flashing in sync, shocking the world. Saul cracks the code, realizing that the winks are a countdown in Morse code, which is reflected in Auggie's eyes.

== Production ==
=== Development ===
The episode was written by series developers David Benioff, D. B. Weiss, and Alexander Woo, and directed by co-executive producer Derek Tsang. It marked Benioff's first writing credit, Weiss' first writing credit, Woo's first writing credit, and Tsang's first directing credit.

=== Writing ===
By having the opening scene set during the Cultural Revolution, Weiss wanted to emphasize "One of the things that sets this show apart is that the main driver is a thing that really happened, and that's generally not the case with science fiction stories." While Woo commented, "Crammed into those first five minutes is a huge emotional journey for every speaking character in that sequence."

== Release ==
The episode, along with the rest of the season, premiered on March 21, 2024, on Netflix. It was originally set to premiere in January 2024.

== Critical reception ==
"Countdown" received positive reviews from critics. Ben Rosenstock of Vulture gave the episode a 4 star rating out of 5 and wrote, "The stakes still aren't totally defined by the end of this pilot: We're starting to get to know these people and what they're dealing with, but the whole web of mysteries is so amorphous and free-floating at this stage that the show hasn't quite achieved a sense of real momentum yet. But there's more than enough to enjoy here if you can swallow the physics babble and just roll with the trippy sci-fi horror grounded by an unusual historical angle. If this show ends up prioritizing existential thrills over visceral action, that's fine by me."

Johnny Loftus of Decider wrote, "they will plunge us into mysterious virtual reality landscapes, and force us to face what a fair-minded reading of theoretical physics allows: that science acknowledges space for something like God to exist, or at least the space for something our puny brains can't conceive outside of a divine context. And if none of that does it for you, just hang with a chain-smoking Benedict Wong as his gruff intelligence operative tries to solve the case." Dan Selcke gave the episode a "B+" grade and wrote, "I like that there's a lot happening in this show. Sometimes I watch a Netflix drama and I think, 'This episode probably didn't need to be an hour long.' 3 Body Problem has the breadth and depth to justify that kind of runtime. I want to dig into more."

Sean T. Collins of The New York Times wrote, "it pays to go into new shows with an open mind if getting maximum enjoyment out of the work is your ultimate goal. So I'm inclined to give 3 Body Problem time to develop into something more than a few interesting images with just enough story to connect them." Billie Doux of Doux Reviews wrote, "The mysteries we were presented with here in the first episode are huge; it's difficult to see how these plots are related. The filming, especially of the sixties flashbacks, was exceptional. And I liked all of the actors they cast, especially the women, who were the focus."

Jerrica Tisdale of Telltale TV wrote, "We have the questions in “Countdown,” but the puzzle begins to unravel only in later episodes. The premiere does enough to grab attention but not enough to inspire urgency to see the rest." Martin Jameson of Sci-Fi Bulletin gave the episode a 9 out of 10 rating and wrote, "A confident, expertly executed and hugely entertaining series opener that has me excited to get stuck in to the rest of the series."

Greg Wheeler of Review Geek gave the episode a 4 star rating out of 5 and wrote, "The episode does jump around a lot, and to different time periods too, but given the source material that's perhaps to be expected. However, there's plenty to whet the appetite and the tantalizing mystery is likely to deepen considerably as the episodes progress. For now though, the first chapter sets the foundations for what should be a very intriguing series." Ryan Kirksey of TV Obsessive noted the absence of certain characters from the novels, "It's a decision that can easily lead to a loud and expensive swing and a miss considering the rabid fan base of the novels, but it's a needle that Benioff and Weiss seem to have successfully threaded through the first hour of the show."
