= Our Lord (3 Body Problem) =

- 3 Body Problem episode
- Episode no.: Season 1 Episode 4
- Directed by: Minkie Spiro
- Written by: Madhuri Shekar
- Cinematography by: Martin Ahlgren
- Editing by: Simon Smith
- Original air date: March 21, 2024
- Running time: 44 minutes

Guest appearances
- Ben Schnetzer as Young Mike Evans; Gerard Monaco as Collins; Aidan Cheng as Reg; John Dagleish as Felix; Naoko Mori as Marie Curie; Avital Lvova as Ramanujan; Jason Forbes as Omar Khayyam; Stacy Abalogun as Thelma; Edmund Kingsley as Jeremiah; Stella Englisch as Gabrielle

Episode chronology
← Previous "Destroyer of Worlds"	Next → "Judgment Day"

"Our Lord" is the fourth episode of the American science fiction television series 3 Body Problem, based on the Chinese novel series Remembrance of Earth's Past by Liu Cixin. The episode was written by Madhuri Shekar, and directed by Minkie Spiro. It was released on Netflix on March 21, 2024, alongside the rest of the season.

The series follows Ye Wenjie, an astrophysicist who sees her father beaten to death during a struggle session in the Chinese Cultural Revolution, who is conscripted by the military. Due to her scientific background, she is sent to a secret military base in a remote region. Her decision at the base to respond to contact from an alien civilization, telling it that humanity can no longer save itself and that she will help the aliens invade Earth, affects a group of scientists in the present day, forcing them to confront humanity's greatest threat. In the episode, Jin is enlisted by Clarence and Wade in infiltrating Evans' secret organization.

The episode received generally positive reviews from critics, although some criticized the pacing.

== Plot ==
=== 1982 ===
In London, a young Mike Evans (Ben Schnetzer) meets with Ye Wenjie (Zine Tseng) in a restaurant. She now works as an astrophysics professor at Tsinghua University, while Evans has inherited his father's oil company. She surprises him by confirming that she got into contact with an off-world entity.

=== 1984 ===
Evans takes Ye Wenjie to the North Atlantic Ocean, to his ship, Judgment Day. There, Evans takes her to a room to show that the civilization has been trying to contact her but she had left the base by that point. They are willing to exchange information, delighting her. Afterwards, she and Evans share a kiss.

=== 2024 ===
The scientists are devastated upon learning of Jack's death, particularly Will (Alex Sharp). Reviewing security footage, Auggie (Eiza González) deduces that the woman she previously saw, Tatiana (Marlo Kelly), was responsible. She and Jin (Jess Hong) later meet with Clarence (Benedict Wong) and Wade (Liam Cunningham), and they enlist Jin's help in infiltrating Evans' secret organization to collect intelligence. Evans (Jonathan Pryce) is notified of this by a person he calls "my Lord", but he is told not to worry.

Evans reads Little Red Riding Hood to the San-Ti "Lord" and explains how the Big Bad Wolf impersonates Red Riding Hood's grandmother in order to deceive her. The San-Ti however struggles to understand the concept of fiction and interprets the story to be a testament to humankind's capacity for deception, chillingly informing Evans that they cannot co-exist with those that deceive – then abruptly ceases contact.

Under Clarence's surveillance, Jin attends a ceremony for people who also completed the VR game. She is stunned when Ye Wenjie (Rosalind Chao) – mother of Jin's recently deceased friend – introduces herself as its leader and that the purpose of the Earth-Trisolaris movement is to help the San-Ti arrive and take over the Earth. Authorities raid the building and arrest Ye Wenjie, although not until after a heavy firefight with armed attendees in which many are killed. During the commotion, Tatiana attempts to kill Jin for her betrayal, but Clarence shoots her first and she is forced to flee. Wade interrogates Ye Wenjie, questioning her about Judgment Day. She is undaunted, and warns that the San-Ti are on their way.

== Production ==
=== Development ===
The episode was written by Madhuri Shekar, and directed by Minkie Spiro. It marked Shekar's first writing credit, and Spiro's first directing credit.

=== Writing ===
Regarding Ye Wenjie's decisions, D. B. Weiss offered his own interpretation, "I don't think [Ye's] a good guy or a bad guy, I think she's a person who made a tremendous mistake. That mistake grew from the decision that she knew what was best for the world, that she could make a determination that no one person could make."

== Release ==
The episode, along with the rest of the season, premiered on March 21, 2024, on Netflix. It was originally set to premiere in January 2024.

== Critical reception ==
"Destroyer of Worlds" received generally positive reviews from critics. Ben Rosenstock of Vulture gave the episode a 3 star rating out of 5 and wrote, "How do you build trust and faith in people so alien to you who have such a different set of values and beliefs? At its best, 3 Body Problem seems eager to explore that quandary. I just worry that we're moving too fast to stop and think about it."

Johnny Loftus of Decider wrote, "“In nature, nothing exists alone.” If the way Chinese physicist Ye Wenjie and Mike Evans the hot rich hermit shared that line in 3 Body Problem Episode 2 felt to you like it had more than one meaning, your payoff arrives in 1982." Dan Selcke gave the episode a "C+" grade and wrote, "It's time we start getting more information about everything, because until we do it's hard to know the true stakes of this story. As it stands, "Our Lord" is a decent interstitial episode of the show, but not a home run."

Sean T. Collins of The New York Times wrote, "I'm glad the show took time to flesh Jack out in this way, even though he’s already gone. A lot of adorable kids who love Star Wars and Man City are going to head Jack's way when our new overlords arrive." Billie Doux of Doux Reviews wrote, "I find myself more intrigued with every episode of this series."

Jerrica Tisdale of Telltale TV wrote, "The actions of these characters don't reflect well on the world but also offer a gruesome truth about brutal “solutions.” Many may pick them but the results are damning and destructive." Greg Wheeler of Review Geek gave the episode a 3 star rating out of 5 and wrote, "in terms of plot progression there's really not a whole lot to sink your teeth into here and beyond the promise of the San-Ti coming, there's not much else noteworthy to comment on. The ending does hint that we're going to see more of the past in the coming chapters, which should help fill in the blanks to this story. However, this is definitely a much slower chapter than what we've seen."
