= Only Advance =

- 3 Body Problem episode
- Episode no.: Season 1 Episode 7
- Directed by: Jeremy Podeswa
- Written by: David Benioff; D. B. Weiss
- Cinematography by: PJ Dillon
- Editing by: Katie Weiland
- Original air date: March 21, 2024
- Running time: 58 minutes

Guest appearances
- Adrian Edmondson as Denys Porlock; Gerard Monaco as Collins; Hélène Vivies as Lecompte; Stephen Rahman-Hughes as Anwar Suleiman; Aidan Cheng as Reg; Bea Svistunenko as Laeticia; Bilal Hasna as Edgar; Mitya Savelau as Dr. Peter Demikhov; Sarah Malin as Doctor; Jim Howick as Harry; Florence Bell as Roxanne; Hassan Mohammed Tag as Chimp Performer

Episode chronology
← Previous "The Stars Our Destination"	Next → "Wallfacer"

"Only Advance" is the seventh episode of the American science fiction television series 3 Body Problem, based on the Chinese novel series Remembrance of Earth's Past by Liu Cixin. The episode was written by series creators David Benioff and D. B. Weiss, and directed by Jeremy Podeswa. It was released on Netflix on March 21, 2024, alongside the rest of the season.

The series follows Ye Wenjie, an astrophysicist who sees her father beaten to death during a struggle session in the Chinese Cultural Revolution, who is conscripted by the military. Due to her scientific background, she is sent to a secret military base in a remote region. Her decision at the base to respond to contact from an alien civilization, telling it that humanity can no longer save itself and that she will help the aliens invade Earth, affects a group of scientists in the present day, forcing them to confront humanity's greatest threat. In the episode, Will has to take a decision over his role in the Staircase Project.

The episode received generally positive reviews from critics, who praised its emotional tone and performances.

== Plot ==
While hanging out with Saul (Jovan Adepo), Will (Alex Sharp) collapses and is re-admitted to the hospital as his cancer worsens. Wade (Liam Cunningham) introduces Jin (Jess Hong), Raj (Saamer Usmani) and other PDC members to the next phase in their plan; cryonic technology. When a chimpanzee successfully survives a month-long cryo-sleep, they prepare to test it on humans. Wade himself plans to be put into cryo-sleep, awake once each year to review and recalibrate the PDC plan, then wake up for good when the San-Ti arrive.

Given Will's imminent death from cancer, Wade suggests he fill the candidacy as the cryo-sleep brain (as physics expertise and minimal weight are necessitated) to be sent in the Staircase Project. Will confesses his feelings for Jin, and decides not to be part of the Staircase Project, but Wade insists. Auggie (Eiza González) leaves the project, only to be informed that she has been fired from her nanofiber company; while the chairman of her board is dismissing her, she releases the research via WikiLeaks, tells him so, and announces she is leaving the country immediately. Ye Wenjie (Rosalind Chao) meets with Saul and attempts to pass on her knowledge about cosmic sociology in the form of a joke that the San-Ti will have difficulty deciphering, saying, "Don't play with God."

Despite Saul's insistence, Will agrees to be euthanized and placed in the Staircase Project. Realizing that Will bought her the star, Jin rushes to the hospital to change his mind, but arrives too late as the procedure has already started. Ye Wenjie decides to go back to Inner Mongolia and returns to the Red Coast station, finding it destroyed. There, she encounters Tatiana (Marlo Kelly), who was assigned by the San-Ti to kill her. Ye Wenjie does not resist, and stares at the sun before peacefully dying.

== Production ==
=== Development ===
The episode was written by series creators David Benioff and D. B. Weiss, and directed by Jeremy Podeswa. It marked Benioff's third writing credit, Weiss' third writing credit, and Podeswa's first directing credit. Podeswa previously worked with Benioff and Weiss on Game of Thrones, having directed a few episodes. Benioff said, "Directors can be bossy and dictatorial, and Jeremy's got none of that. He's a true partner in the artistic process, but also he's quite strong and tough minded."

=== Filming ===
The final scene was filmed on an old military base in Spain. Benioff said, "We were losing the light in a very dramatic way at the very end there. When you see them silhouetted and you see the sun going down... it was just a race to get those last shots off before it was total darkness."

== Release ==
The episode, along with the rest of the season, premiered on March 21, 2024, on Netflix. It was originally set to premiere in January 2024.

== Critical reception ==
"Only Advance" received generally positive reviews from critics. Ben Rosenstock of Vulture gave the episode a 4 star rating out of 5 and wrote, "The character fates at the conclusion of “Only Advances” aren’t fully devastating in the way of the best sci-fi deaths, but this is still a well-balanced, emotionally resonant episode that sets us up well for the finale."

Johnny Loftus of Decider wrote, "It’s terminal cancer patient Will Downing's time to shine in Episode 7 of 3 Body Problem, because his unique skill set – willing temperament, Oxford-trained smarts, eroding physical form – makes him the perfect candidate for Thomas Wade's Staircase Project." Dan Selcke gave the episode a "B" grade and wrote, "I'm sunk in now. This is a good show. I'm looking forward to the finale and dreading the wait for a second season that might not even come. Fingers crossed for a renewal."

Sean T. Collins of The New York Times wrote, "Just looking at it, you feel as if something important is happening and someone important is being lost. The episode closes with this image. It's not a return to the spectacular endings of the first few episodes, but it'll do." Jerrica Tisdale of Telltale TV wrote, "“Only Advance” convinces you of Will's importance. Before this episode, he feels underdeveloped and lacks key components that make a compelling character, such as backstory, interests, hopes, dreams, and so forth." Greg Wheeler of Review Geek gave the episode a 2 star rating out of 5 and wrote, "The penultimate episode comes and goes, not with a roar but with a whimper. This show has really slowed to a crawl and the subplots have dragged on without much development. It's almost like the writers have remembered we have people we're supposed to care about here and it has taken them 6 episodes to figure that out."
