= Judgment Day (3 Body Problem) =

- 3 Body Problem episode
- Episode no.: Season 1 Episode 5
- Directed by: Minkie Spiro
- Written by: David Benioff; D. B. Weiss
- Cinematography by: Martin Ahlgren
- Editing by: Michael Ruscio
- Original air date: March 21, 2024
- Running time: 58 minutes

Guest appearances
- Vedette Lim as Vera Ye; John Dagleish as Felix; Jason Barnett as Eugene; Em Thane as Tech #1; Hywel Morgan as Selwyn Pugh; Lainy Boyle as Mother of Theo; Jarlan Bogolubov as Theo; Lucy Russell as Lucy

Episode chronology
← Previous "Our Lord"	Next → "The Stars Our Destination"

"Judgment Day" is the fifth episode of the American science fiction television series 3 Body Problem, based on the Chinese novel series Remembrance of Earth's Past by Liu Cixin. The episode was written by series creators David Benioff and D. B. Weiss, and directed by Minkie Spiro. It was released on Netflix on March 21, 2024, alongside the rest of the season.

The series follows Ye Wenjie, an astrophysicist who sees her father beaten to death during a struggle session in the Chinese Cultural Revolution, who is conscripted by the military. Due to her scientific background, she is sent to a secret military base in a remote region. Her decision at the base to respond to contact from an alien civilization, telling it that humanity can no longer save itself and that she will help the aliens invade Earth, affects a group of scientists in the present day, forcing them to confront humanity's greatest threat. In the episode, Wade and Clarence work to stop Evans' ship and kill the San-Ti supporters aboard.

The episode received highly positive reviews from critics, who praised its answers and ending.

== Plot ==
Wade (Liam Cunningham) decides to hire Raj (Saamer Usmani), a commander of the Royal Navy and Jin's boyfriend, into his operation. During this, Clarence (Benedict Wong) interrogates Ye Wenjie (Rosalind Chao), who claims the San-Ti allowed her to be captured because she is no longer useful to them.

Realizing that Evans' ship Judgment Day is the key to communicating with the San-Ti, Clarence asks Auggie (Eiza González) for help in using the nanofiber technology. Auggie reluctantly re-activates it, but is surprised when the countdown does not return. They take the technology with Wade, who commands a Royal Navy team to intercept the ship, which is heading towards the Panama Canal. The nanofiber operation works; a fence made with the nanofibers is constructed in the Canal and shreds apart the Judgment Day as it passes through, killing everyone on board, including Evans (Jonathan Pryce). Clarence and Wade retrieve the data disk, which the San-Ti allow them to take. They also take a recording of the San-Ti's confusion over humanity's ability to lie, and show it to Ye Wenjie, disturbing her.

Still curious over the San-Ti's intentions, Wade visits Jin (Jess Hong) for help. They both put on the VR headset, and are met by the San-Ti avatar. They are told that the San-Ti are using two Sophons – each a single proton, unfolded in a high-dimension form to massive size and then encoded, forming a sentient supercomputer – to cause the anomalous effects observed in particle accelerators, the countdowns and the flashing night sky. (Note: as shown in "Countdown") The two Sophons on Earth are quantum entangled with one Sophon each, which are travelling with the invasion fleet. This allows the San-Ti instantaneous communication and control. They plan to cripple Earth's scientific advancement, preventing humans from technologically surpassing them before their arrival at Earth. Suddenly, all electronic displays on Earth show the words "YOU ARE BUGS", while a Sophon envelops the planet, forming a giant eye on its body and revealing the existence and power of the San-Ti. Tatiana (Marlo Kelly) watches it from the street, and smiles.

== Production ==
=== Development ===
The episode was written by series creators David Benioff and D. B. Weiss, and directed by Minkie Spiro. It marked Benioff's second writing credit, Weiss' second writing credit, and Spiro's second directing credit.

=== Filming ===
For the assault on Judgment Day, the series used crew members to slice the characters without using special effects, which was later converted in post-production. Production designer Deborah Riley said that they used a neoprene, which "was rigged onto a very simple rig, but whereby those strips could be pushed and pulled and angled up or down, and it made these strips look like they had been mangled." Imagery based on Calabi-Yau manifolds was used in order to illustrate the high-dimensional abilities of the San-Ti alien civilization.

== Release ==
The episode, along with the rest of the season, premiered on March 21, 2024, on Netflix. It was originally set to premiere in January 2024.

== Critical reception ==
"Judgment Day" received highly positive reviews from critics. Ben Rosenstock of Vulture gave the episode a 4 star rating out of 5 and wrote, "I can't argue too much with this style of storytelling when the results are this entertaining. “Judgment Day” is probably the fastest-paced episode of this season, with a simple focus: a violent, morally compromising action-movie heist to procure a MacGuffin, followed by the exciting aftermath where the heroes get some of the answers they've wanted so desperately. It's disturbing, thought-provoking, and also just cool, even when there's nothing especially romantic or badass about the level of undeserved bloodshed. And it leaves me pretty stumped about where this story could go next. That's a good episode of 3 Body Problem."

Johnny Loftus of Decider wrote, "The revelation that the machines won and shunted all of us into a holding pen simulation remains one of the hugest science fiction things ever. So maybe it's even more huge that David Benioff and D.B. Weiss, as writers of episode five of 3 Body Problem, pull off a civilization-level reveal like that here on the small screen." Dan Selcke gave the episode an "A" grade and wrote, "This may have been the best episode of 3 Body Problem so far. The show's biggest weakness is that as imaginative and exciting as the twists and turns of the plot are, the characters still feel pretty flat on the whole, which to be fair is more or less in keeping with the first book in Cixin's series."

Sean T. Collins of The New York Times wrote, "Once again, 3 Body Problem closes on a horrific high note, something that seemed impossible to do in an episode featuring hundreds of julienned corpses." Billie Doux of Doux Reviews wrote, "3 Body Problem is exceptional storytelling, but flawed. They keep setting up characters and situations, like the Countdown, and then knocking them down when the audience had every reason to expect more."

Jerrica Tisdale of Telltale TV wrote, "3 Body Problem shows the duality of this choice. You see the horror in them but also understand why people may choose this course of action. However, Auggie is painted as a sympathetic hero who does something bad while Raji and Wade feel nefarious." Greg Wheeler of Review Geek gave the episode a 3.5 star rating out of 5 and wrote, "This explains why brilliant minds across the world all went the same way and either commit suicide or stopped their experiments. It would have been interesting to see exactly what would have happened had that countdown got to zero but alas, we have our answers."
