= Destroyer of Worlds (3 Body Problem) =

- 3 Body Problem episode
- Episode no.: Season 1 Episode 3
- Directed by: Andrew Stanton
- Written by: Alexander Woo
- Cinematography by: PJ Dillon
- Editing by: Simon Smith
- Original air date: March 21, 2024
- Running time: 54 minutes

Guest appearances
- Mark Gatiss as Isaac Newton; Reece Shearsmith as Alan Turing; Conleth Hill as Pope Gregory XIII; Adrian Edmondson as Denys Porlock; Eve Ridley as Follower; Gerard Monaco as Collins; John Dagleish as Felix; Jenson Cheng as Kublai Khan; Phil Wang as Aristotle; Adrian Greensmith as Galileo Galilei; Yeit-Ming fu as Guard; Ulrich Brandhoff as Gisler; Jordan Alexandra as Siobhan; Nitin Ganatra as Ranjit Varma; Shaheen Khan as Priya Varma; Aarushi Ganju as Nisha Varma; Ranika Kaur as Geeta Varma

Episode chronology
← Previous "Red Coast"	Next → "Our Lord"

"Destroyer of Worlds" is the third episode of the American science fiction television series 3 Body Problem, based on the Chinese novel series Remembrance of Earth's Past by Liu Cixin. The episode was written by series co-creator Alexander Woo, and directed by co-executive producer Andrew Stanton. It was released on Netflix on March 21, 2024, alongside the rest of the season.

The series follows Ye Wenjie, an astrophysicist who sees her father beaten to death during a struggle session in the Chinese Cultural Revolution, who is conscripted by the military. Due to her scientific background, she is sent to a secret military base in a remote region. Her decision at the base to respond to contact from an alien civilization, telling it that humanity can no longer save itself and that she will help the aliens invade Earth, affects a group of scientists in the present day, forcing them to confront humanity's greatest threat. In the episode, Jin and Jack continue exploring the VR game, working together to reach more levels.

The episode received highly positive reviews from critics, some of whom considered the episode as the best of the three up to its point.

== Plot ==
=== 2024 ===
In Switzerland, Clarence (Benedict Wong) visits the CERN to investigate another scientist's suicide. Checking his house, he discovers a VR headset. While meeting with her colleagues, Auggie (Eiza González) is dismayed upon learning that Jin (Jess Hong) and Jack (John Bradley) have similar VR headsets, and asks them to not play again.

Despite that, Jin and Jack ignore her warning and decide to play the game together. They are summoned before Pope Gregory XIII (Conleth Hill), who wants to know about the strange activity in the Sun. Jin offers her hypothesis, suggesting three Suns could affect the Earth's orbit as it is part of a three-star system. Deeming them as heretic, the Pope orders her death. But as Jack prevents her from being burned alive, the civilization is destroyed after the three suns fall upon it. A woman appears before them, stating that they have gained access to Level 3. In the real world, Auggie decides to power up her nanofiber project. However, the countdown returns and she again hastily shuts the project down.

On Level 3, Jin and Jack find themselves in Shangdu, where they compete with Isaac Newton (Mark Gatiss) and Alan Turing (Reece Shearsmith) in offering an explanation behind the Sun movements to Kublai Khan. Newton and Turing introduce their "Human Abacus", a giant analog processor in which soldiers act as binary input and output, but Jin concludes that there will be a tri-solar syzygy. Her theories prove correct, and the civilization is once again destroyed. The woman appears again, and tells them they advanced to Level 4, as they immediately concluded that their purpose is not finding a solution to the three-body problem, a mathematical impossibility, but ensuring the survival of the civilization.

In the real world, Jin and Jack are invited to a secret location to access Level 4. They meet a woman named Tatiana (Marlo Kelly), who gives them access to the level; a real-world meeting between other victors. There, they discover that the purpose of the game is to find a new home for an alien species known as San Ti, and Ye Wenjie helped them in the past. Jack refuses to participate any further and asks to leave, which Tatiana allows. He returns home, unaware that Clarence is surveilling his house outside. Sensing a noise, he enters and discovers Tatiana. He asks her to leave, but she responds by brutally killing him. Despite that, neither Clarence nor the home security system recognizes Tatiana, who suddenly vanishes from the scene.

== Production ==
=== Development ===
The episode was written by series co-creator Alexander Woo, and directed by co-executive producer Andrew Stanton. It marked Woo's second writing credit, and Stanton's first directing credit.

=== Filming ===
On the scenes featuring the virtual reality, Stanton said, "We took full advantage of reality with that world. We were able to build the very tip of the observation deck that would be on top of the dome, and then implied the rest of the world." Weiss was interested in the concept of the gravity affecting the Shangdu scene, explaining "Its such a clever conceit, the Mongol setting and the Kublai Khan of it all. Mixing that very grounded historical reality with something that's completely bonkers: gravity getting turned negative."

== Release ==
The episode, along with the rest of the season, premiered on March 21, 2024, on Netflix. It was originally set to premiere in January 2024.

== Critical reception ==
"Destroyer of Worlds" received highly positive reviews from critics. Daniel Fienberg of The Hollywood Reporter wrote, "This is the episode that goes the deepest into the world of the virtual reality game and lays the stakes out for the real world as well. More frequently, though, I'm guessing that television-only viewers are going to find the game and a lot of the footnote-y traces of the book to be either perplexing or purposeless. I truly don't know how it could have been done better, but when a season reaches its brainy peak shortly before the half-way point, there's a lot of increasingly perfunctory plotting to go."

Ben Rosenstock of Vulture gave the episode a 4 star rating out of 5 and wrote, "Up to this point in 3 Body Problem, easily the most interesting character has been Ye Wenjie: a woman who lived through the Cultural Revolution and, disgusted by humanity, sought salvation in the stars. So it's a surprise that taking some time off from her story ends up working so well for “Destroyer of Worlds,” easily the most focused episode yet."

Johnny Loftus of Decider wrote, "In 3 Body Problem Episode 3, the stakes are further defined for our friends, who are now down to being the Oxford Four." Dan Selcke gave the episode a "C" grade and wrote, "I think there's the making of a good episode here, but this was the weakest hour of the show yet."

Sean T. Collins of The New York Times wrote, "Much as we dread seeing people get what's coming, there's an undeniable allure to watching the worst-case scenario play out — as long as it's happening safely onscreen." Billie Doux of Doux Reviews wrote, "A stunning episode. With some answers, even."

Jerrica Tisdale of Telltale TV wrote, "Because of our investment in Jin, “Destroyer of Worlds” offers entertaining developments and the expected but still shocking moment. This episode seems like the turning point that shows us the path of the rest of the season. We're excited for the journey." Greg Wheeler of Review Geek gave the episode a 4 star rating out of 5 and wrote, "The ending, with this strange woman killing Jack, hints that there could be more deaths to come before this one’s said and done. Either way, everything is left wide open for the rest of the season."
