= Wallfacer =

- 3 Body Problem episode
- Episode no.: Season 1 Episode 8
- Directed by: Jeremy Podeswa
- Written by: David Benioff; D. B. Weiss
- Cinematography by: PJ Dillon
- Editing by: Simon Smith
- Original air date: March 21, 2024
- Running time: 57 minutes

Guest appearances
- CCH Pounder as Secretary-General Lilian Joseph; Josh Brener as Sebastian Kent; Hélène Vivies as Lecompte; Stephen Rahman-Hughes as Anwar Suleiman; Bea Svistunenko as Laeticia; Bilal Hasna as Edgar; Adam Silver as Assassin; Lily Newmark as Nora; Jose Palma as Roberto; Bobak Ferdowsi as Mission Director; Richard James-Neale as Soldier; Clem Cheung as General Hou Bolin; Salem Murphy as Leyla Ariç; Jake Tapper as Himself; Abby Phillip as Herself

Episode chronology
← Previous "Only Advance"	Next → —

"Wallfacer" is the eighth episode and first season finale of the American science fiction television series 3 Body Problem, based on the Chinese novel series Remembrance of Earth's Past by Liu Cixin. The episode was written by series creators David Benioff and D. B. Weiss, and directed by Jeremy Podeswa. It was released on Netflix on March 21, 2024, alongside the rest of the season.

The series follows Ye Wenjie, an astrophysicist who sees her father beaten to death during a struggle session in the Chinese Cultural Revolution, who is conscripted by the military. Due to her scientific background, she is sent to a secret military base in a remote region. Her decision at the base to respond to contact from an alien civilization, telling it that humanity can no longer save itself and that she will help the aliens invade Earth, affects a group of scientists in the present day, forcing them to confront humanity's greatest threat. In the episode, Saul is recruited for the Wallfacer Project, while the Staircase Project is put into motion.

The episode received generally positive reviews from critics, who praised its "calm" nature and character development, although many expressed frustration with the season's pacing.

== Plot ==
Saul (Jovan Adepo) has a one-night stand with a woman named Nora, and the two argue over the San-Ti's threat. As he accompanies her to take an Uber, a chain of events causes a car to deviate and kill Nora, horrifying Saul. Clarence (Benedict Wong) interrogates Saul, suggesting that the San-Ti may have been targeting Saul instead.

Clarence takes Saul to New York City, where they are guided to the United Nations by an agent, Sebastian Kent (Josh Brener). Secretary-General Lilian Joseph (CCH Pounder) introduces Saul and two other scientists to take part in the Wallfacer Project, where each one is tasked to develop a plan to defeat the San-Ti contained entirely within each of their own minds, as the San-Ti are unable to read minds. Saul refuses to participate, but is shot by a sniper as he leaves the United Nations, although he survives by a bulletproof vest that Clarence provided him. He is taken by Clarence to a hospital, where the shooter apologizes for not shooting him in the head.

When Saul is released from the hospital, he accompanies Jin and Wade (Liam Cunningham) to Ground Control and see the launch of the Staircase Project from Cape Canaveral Space Force Station. Initially, the launch is considered a success, and Will's cryogenically frozen brain is launched into space, in hope that the San-Ti will intercept and reconstruct his body with it. However, a sail tether malfunctions and causes the probe to deviate from its prescribed path, resulting in the project’s apparent failure. Tatiana (Marlo Kelly) returns to her RV home, where she finds that she has received a new VR headset. Auggie (Eiza González) is seen in San Luis Potosí, Mexico, where she helps the locals with her nanofibers, and ignores a phone call from Saul.

On a private flight, Wade is visited by the San-Ti liaison, who taunts him before the San-Ti begin to make him hallucinate the horrifying visions that had led to the suicides of the scientists in the beginning. Clarence takes a despondent Saul and Jin to a swamp. There, he introduces them to a swarm of cicadas, insects that have survived despite humanity's decades-long attempts to eradicate them, implying humanity has the same resilience. They leave the swamp, preparing to make another stand against the San-Ti.

== Production ==
=== Development ===
The episode was written by series creators David Benioff and D. B. Weiss, and directed by Jeremy Podeswa. It marked Benioff's fourth writing credit, Weiss' fourth writing credit, and Podeswa's second directing credit.

=== Writing ===
On Saul's role in the episode, Alexander Woo explained, "We pretty deliberately kept Saul in the shadows for the first seven episodes. He's an important character, a major character, but he plays a supporting part in a lot of other storylines, but [this] makes it hopefully all the more unlikely that he's the one who's thrust into the limelight for almost all of Episode 8."

On the final scene, Benioff said, "It's really a tragic moment for Jin and tragic moment for Saul, who is one of Will's best friends, and they're despondent at the very end. And the one person who doesn't really have patience for their despondency is Da Shi, whose attitude is: We're at war, have your moment to grieve, but now it's time to get back to work."

== Release ==
The episode, along with the rest of the season, premiered on March 21, 2024, on Netflix. It was originally set to premiere in January 2024.

== Critical reception ==
"Wallfacer" received generally positive reviews from critics. Ben Rosenstock of Vulture gave the episode a 4 star rating out of 5 and wrote, "This is a show structured around an alien invasion that won't occur for another 400 years; it's an exercise in delayed gratification, and this season finale doesn't exactly offer closure. That's not to say that there are too many dangling mysteries at this point besides the San-Ti's physical appearance. This first season has done a pretty good job answering the main questions from those first couple of episodes. The ambiguities that remain are bigger and broader."

Johnny Loftus of Decider wrote, "viewers anticipating the Episode 8 Season 1 finale could not possibly have expected creators David Benioff, D.B. Weiss, and Alexander Woo to conclude a season this sprawling with a bow tied around the adventures of humanity against an omniscient alien aggressor." Dan Selcke gave the episode an "A–" grade and wrote, "Despite a couple of touch-and-go moments in the middle, I ended up really enjoying 3 Body Problem. I came around to the characters, I appreciated that it always had some new scientific idea for me to ponder, I liked the ambition and the sense of terrible awe before our alien overlords, and I might go so far as to say that it made me proud to be a human being. That's gotta be worth a second season at least. Right, Netflix?"

Sean T. Collins of The New York Times wrote, "Well, the season finale has come and gone, and there's no storm in sight. It wasn't the calm before the storm. It was all just... calm." Jerrica Tisdale of Telltale TV wrote, "The final episode feels not like a conclusion but just a beginning. Clearly, the show hopes to have many seasons. As the intro season, 3 Body Problem does a good job of making you care about these characters and this world. We're invested." Greg Wheeler of Review Geek gave the episode a 2.5 star rating out of 5 and wrote, "I can't speak on behalf of how well the source material has been adapted but based on this as a stand-alone show, this has really been a disappointingly slow venture."
