= Shook (2024 film) =

- Film poster
- Directed by: Amar Wala
- Screenplay by: Amar Wala; Adnan Khan
- Produced by: Karen Harnisch; Amar Wala
- Starring: Saamer Usmani; Bernard White; Amy Forsyth; Pamela Mala Sinha
- Cinematography: Peter Hadfield
- Music by: Kalaisan Kalaichelvan
- Production companies: Film Forge; Scarborough Pictures
- Distributed by: Elevation Pictures
- Release date: September 7, 2024 (TIFF)
- Running time: 115 minutes
- Country: Canada
- Languages: English; Hindi

Shook is a 2024 Canadian drama film, co-written, produced, and directed by Amar Wala.

An expansion of his 2018 short film of the same name, which starred Raymond Ablack as Ashish and Sugith Varughese as his father, the film is based in part on Wala's own experiences after his real father was diagnosed with Parkinson's disease.

== Premise ==
Ashish (Saamer Usmani), an Indo-Canadian aspiring writer living in the Scarborough district of Toronto, is torn between a desire to move downtown to pursue his career dreams and his sense of obligation to reconnect with his estranged father Vijay (Bernard White) after the older man is diagnosed with Parkinson's.

== Cast ==
- Saamer Usmani as Ashish
- Bernard White as Vijay
- Amy Forsyth as Claire, a barista with whom Ashish develops a romantic relationship
- Pamela Mala Sinha as Ashish's mother Nisha
- Faizan Khan as Rohit, Ashish's best friend
- Shomari Downer as Gilbert, Ashish's best friend
- Pragya Shail as Jaspreet
- Izad Etemadi
- Darrin Baker
- Olivier Lamarche
- Sammy Azero
- Scott Edgecombe
- Sharjil Rasool
- Rehan Suleman
- Devanshu Narang
- Amit Divekar

== Production ==
Wala co-wrote the screenplay with novelist Adnan Khan. In an interview with the Canada Media Fund, Wala cited Good Will Hunting as an inspiration for Shook, hoping to present Scarborough in a similar manner as the former film depicted Boston.

== Release ==
The film premiered in the Discovery program at the 2024 Toronto International Film Festival.

== Critical response ==
Pat Mullen of That Shelf wrote that "Shook tours through the neighbourhoods of Toronto, observing these relationships as they play out in noodle shops, coffee houses, bars, trendy cocktail joints, and house parties. Wala brings a great sense of place to Shook. He unabashedly shoots Toronto as Toronto and echoes his own protagonist's drive to root his stories in people and places that are recognizably real. Shook sometimes struggles in scripting the dialogue, though, as some exchanges are a bit on the nose, particularly regarding the racial dynamics at play. At the same time, this observation comes from a white critic's perspective and echoes points that Ash and company hammer home: it's impossible to know life through another's eyes."

Wilson Kwong, writing in Film Inquiry, said: "The way this film is able to shine new light into a community that is typically painted with dark colours, really illustrates the beauty and importance of meaningful representation. Shook does suffer from tying its narrative bow with a bit too much ease, with its premise being one that would’ve likely benefited from a more nuanced ending. Perhaps this was done in order to make the film more accessible. Either way, Wala has crafted a fine story, and impresses in his feature film debut. Those from Scarborough will appreciate its balanced portrayal of the beloved neighbourhood, but there’s something here for everyone."
