= Josh Brener =

American actor (born 1984)

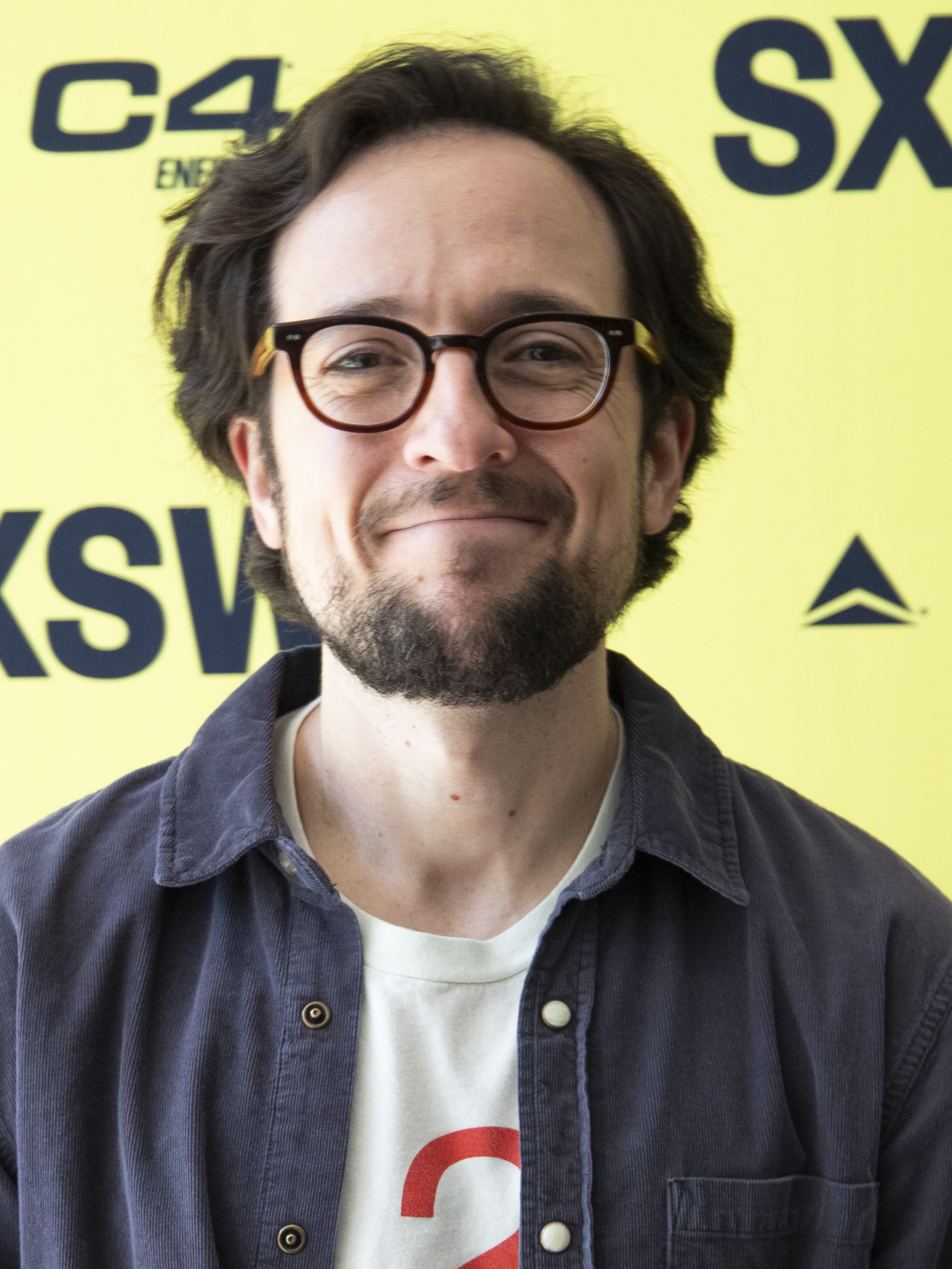
- Brener in 2024
- Born: Houston, Texas, U.S.
- Education: Harvard University
- Occupation: Actor
- Years active: 1996, 2009–present
- Spouse: Meghan Falcone (m. 2018)

Josh Brener is an American actor. He played the roles of Kyle on the IFC series Maron, Nelson "Big Head" Bighetti on the HBO series Silicon Valley, and Alan Zweibel in the film Saturday Night. In animation, he provides the voices of Mark Beaks in the 2017 reboot of DuckTales, Donatello on Rise of the Teenage Mutant Ninja Turtles, Neeku Vozo on Star Wars Resistance, Dylan Dalmatian on 101 Dalmatian Street, Twig on The Mighty Ones, and Intelligence Pete on Sniper Grit.

== Early life ==
Brener was born in Houston, Texas, and was raised in a Jewish household. He attended Bellaire High School.

Brener graduated from Harvard University in 2007. He was the president of the Hasty Pudding Theatricals, a student theatrical society at Harvard.

== Filmography ==
=== Film ===
Year	Title	Role	Notes
2013	The Internship	Lyle Spaulding	
2015	Welcome to Happiness	Ripley	
2015	The Rumperbutts	Richie	
2016	The Belko Experiment	Keith McLure	
2016	Unleashed	Luke	
2016	Max Steel	Steel	Voice
2016	Baked in Brooklyn	David	
2017	Where's the Money	Clarke	
2018	Seven Stages to Achieve Eternal Bliss	Cultist	
2018	The Front Runner	Doug Wilson	
2019	What Men Want	Brandon Wallace	
2020	All My Life	Eric Bronitt	
2022	Rise of the Teenage Mutant Ninja Turtles: The Movie	Donatello, additional voices	Voice
2022	Sniper: Rogue Mission	Pete	Direct-to-video
2022	Bromates	Sid	
2023	Old Dads	Dana	
2023	Sniper: G.R.I.T. – Global Response & Intelligence Team	Pete	Direct-to-video
2024	Megamind vs. the Doom Syndicate	Ol' Chum	Voice
2024	Saturday Night	Alan Zweibel	
2024	Carry-On	Herschel	
2025	Cold Wallet	Charles Hegel	Premiered at the 2024 South by Southwest festival on March 8, 2024. Released to the US on February 28, 2025.
2026	That Friend	Henry	
TBA	White Elephant		Post-production

=== Television ===
Year	Title	Role	Notes
1996	Sorcerer Hunters	Boy (voice)	Episode: "Big Mama Once Again"; English dub
2010–11	Glory Daze	Zack Miller	10 episodes
2011, 2013	The Big Bang Theory	Dale	2 episodes
2012	House of Lies	Will Davis	Episode: "Veritas"
2013	Workaholics	Marshall Davis	Episode: "In Line"
2013–15	Maron	Kyle	12 episodes
2014	The Middle	Julian	Episode: "Heck on a Hard Body"
2014–19	Silicon Valley	Nelson "Big Head" Bighetti	53 episodes
2015	Scandal	Gavin Price	Episode: "Yes"
2016–18	Future-Worm!	Chadd Gold, Nils (voice)	4 episodes
2017	Star Wars Rebels	Erskin Semaj, Imperial Tech (voice)	2 episodes
2017–21	DuckTales	Mark Beaks (voice)	10 episodes
2018	Swedish Dicks	Rick	Episode: "Girls Day!"
2018–20	Rise of the Teenage Mutant Ninja Turtles	Donatello (voice)	57 episodes
2018–20	Star Wars Resistance	Neeku Vozo (voice)	34 episodes
2019	The Neighborhood	Trevor	Episode: "Welcome to Malcolm's Job"
2019	Modern Family	Carl	Episode: "The Wild"
2019–20	101 Dalmatian Street	Dylan Dalmatian (voice)	26 episodes
2019–25	Love, Death & Robots	K-VRC, Shower Head, Litter Box (voice)	3 episodes
2020	Star Wars: The Clone Wars	Worker (voice)	Episode: "Together Again"
2020–21	Mythic Quest	Young C.W. Longbottom	2 episodes
2020–22	The Mighty Ones	Twig, Mud Puddle (voice)	40 episodes
2021	It's Pony	Kyle	Episode: "Raiders of the Lost Cinema"
2021–23	Rugrats	Daxton (voice)	11 episodes
2023	The Last of Us	Murray	Episode: "When You're Lost in the Darkness"
2023–24	Hailey's On It!	A.C. (voice)	13 episodes
2024	Megamind Rules!	Ol' Chum (voice)	16 episodes
2024	3 Body Problem	Kent	Episode: "Wallfacer"
2025	I Love LA	Victor	Episode: "Girl's Girl"
2025	Beavis and Butt-Head	Beavis H. / Paul (voice)	2 episodes
2025	StuGo	Bombo (voice)	Episode: "Pea-Brained Mutant Crystal Nuptials"
2026	Stuart Fails to Save the Universe	Trevor	Recurring role

=== Video games ===
Year	Title	Role
2020	Grounded	BURG.L

=== Music videos ===
Year	Title	Role	Artist
2017	"Champion"	Simulation User	Fall Out Boy
