= Gold Mountain (film) =

- Directed by: Ang Lee
- Screenplay by: Chang-Rae Lee
- Based on: How Much of These Hills Is Gold by C Pam Zhang
- Produced by: Anthony Bregman; Peter Cron; Simon Cornwell; Stephen Cornwell; Ang Lee; Gregory Goodman; David Lee; Jason Siu
- Starring: Chedi Chang; Sophia Xu; Yao; Zine Tseng; Owen Teague
- Cinematography: Joshua James Richards
- Edited by: Tim Squyres
- Music by: Mychael Danna
- Production companies: Fifth Season; The Ink Factory; Likely Story; 127 Wall Productions; Emperor Motion Pictures; Haishang Pictures; Central Motion Picture Corporation; Damai Entertainment Holdings; China Film Group
- Countries: United States; China; Hong Kong; Taiwan
- Language: English

Gold Mountain is an upcoming epic Western film directed by Ang Lee from a screenplay written by Chang-Rae Lee, based on the novel How Much of These Hills Is Gold by C Pam Zhang.

== Premise ==
Two Chinese-American immigrants confront an unforgiving Western frontier near the end of the California gold rush.

== Cast ==
- Chedi Chang as Lucy
- Sophia Xu as Sam
- Yao as Dad
- Zine Tseng as Mom
- Owen Teague
- Josh Stewart

== Production ==
In June 2025, Ang Lee announced that he would direct a film adaptation of C Pam Zhang's novel How Much of These Hills Is Gold, his first project since 2019's Gemini Man. Chang-Rae Lee penned the screenplay.

Production was set to begin in Sacramento County in the spring of 2026. Production began in May 2026, with Chedi Chang, Sophia Xu, Yao, Zine Tseng, and Owen Teague joining the cast. Production on the film wrapped in August 2026.
