= Pamela Mala Sinha =

Canadian actress and playwright

Pamela Mala Sinha is a Canadian actress and playwright. She is most noted for her 2012 one-woman show Crash, for which she won two Dora Mavor Moore Awards for Outstanding New Play and Outstanding Performance by a Female in a Principal Role – Play (Large Theatre). She was previously nominated as an actress in 2011 for her performance in Anusree Roy's Brothel #9.

Originally from Winnipeg, Manitoba, she wrote Crash based on her own experience having been sexually assaulted while attending theatre school in Montreal. She is currently based in Toronto, Ontario.

Sinha's second theatrical play, Happy Place, premiered at the Soulpepper Theatre Company in 2015. It was subsequently adapted by Helen Shaver for the 2020 film Happy Place, for which Sinha wrote the screenplay and performs the role of Rosemary.

On television, she has had recurring and supporting roles as Wanda in Street Legal, Rani in The Newsroom, Faith Colero in Traders, and desk clerk Amira in ER. In 2024 she appeared in the theatrical film Shook.

New was shortlisted for the Governor General's Award for English-language poetry at the 2024 Governor General's Awards.
