= An Act of Valour =

An Act of Valour DVD cover art.

An Act of Valour is a 2010 short film and the directorial debut by the English actor Allan Corduner. It was written by Juha Leppäjärvi, and produced by Janet Sate for Caravanserai Productions. The film premiered at the 24th BFI London Lesbian and Gay Film Festival in March 2010.

== Synopsis ==
A London gay couple, Kevin and Will, face a grim morning after anxiously waiting for the next news broadcast. At a police station, Detective Sergeant Russell is trying to pacify Lisa, whose boyfriend seems to be missing. There's a body on a nearby common.

== Cast ==
Henry Blake as Will & Juha Leppäjärvi as Kevin

- Juha Leppäjärvi as Kevin
- Henry Blake as Will
- Marcus D'Amico as DS Russell
- Victoria Bavister as Lisa
- Gerard Monaco as Jeremy
- Dorian Black (aka Dusty Limits) as Bette Noir
- Kristin McIlquham as PC Harris.

Writer and actor Juha Leppäjärvi, aka Juha Sorola, developed the script at Caravanserai Acting Studio, of which he is one of the founding members and Allan Corduner, directed it.
