= 3 Body Problem (TV series) =

American sci-fi television series

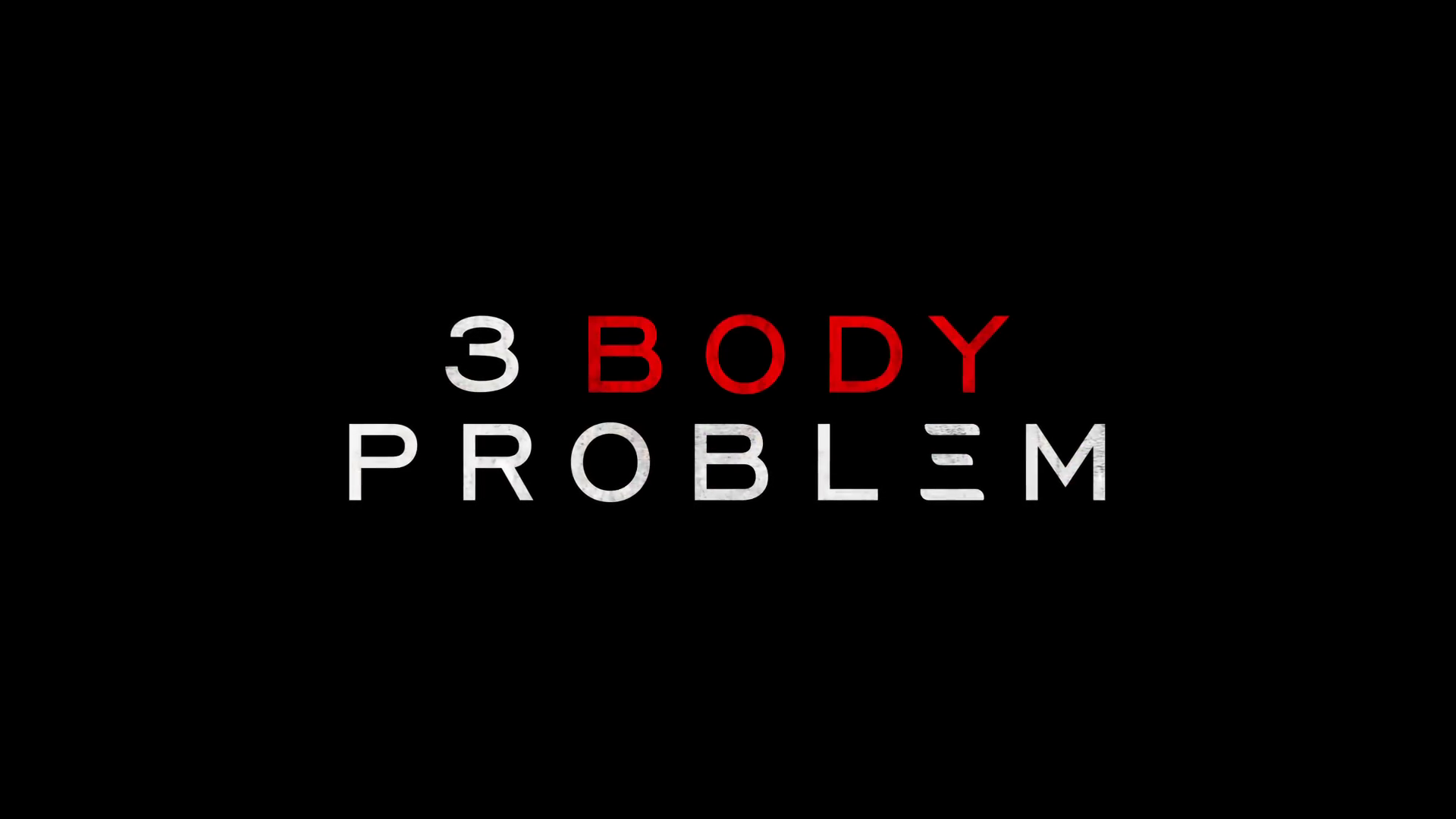
- Genre: Fantasy drama; Mystery thriller; Science fiction
- Created by: David Benioff; D. B. Weiss; Alexander Woo
- Based on: Remembrance of Earth's Past by Liu Cixin
- Starring: Jovan Adepo; John Bradley; Rosalind Chao; Liam Cunningham; Eiza González; Jess Hong; Marlo Kelly; Alex Sharp; Sea Shimooka; Zine Tseng; Saamer Usmani; Benedict Wong; Jonathan Pryce
- Music by: Ramin Djawadi
- Country of origin: United States
- Original languages: English; Mandarin
- No. of seasons: 1
- No. of episodes: 8

Production
- Executive producers: Rosamund Pike; Robie Uniacke; Qi Lin; Jilong Zhao; Lauren Ma; Xiaosong Gao; Brad Pitt; Jeremy Kleiner; Dede Gardner; Rian Johnson; Ram Bergman; Nena Rodrigue; Bernadette Caulfield; Alexander Woo; David Benioff; D. B. Weiss
- Producers: Steve Kullback; Hameed Shaukat
- Cinematography: Jonathan Freeman; Richard Donnelly; PJ Dillon; Martin Ahlgren
- Editors: Katie Weiland; Simon Smith; Michael Ruscio; Anna Hauger
- Running time: 44–63 minutes
- Production companies: BLB; The Three Body Universe; T-Street; Plan B Entertainment; Primitive Streak

Original release
- Network: Netflix
- Release: March 21, 2024 – present

3 Body Problem is an American science fiction television series created by David Benioff, D. B. Weiss, and Alexander Woo. It is the third adaptation of the Chinese novel series Remembrance of Earth's Past by former computer engineer Liu Cixin. The series' title comes from the first volume, The Three-Body Problem, named after a classical physics problem dealing with Newton's laws of motion and gravitation. The eight-episode first season was released on Netflix on March 21, 2024.

The series centers on a diverse group of characters, mainly scientists, who encounter an extraterrestrial civilization, triggering numerous threats and profound changes for humanity. While the two earlier adaptations, the animated The Three-Body Problem in Minecraft (2014–2020) and the live-action Three-Body (2023), were entirely in the novels' original Mandarin, 3 Body Problem is primarily in English with some Mandarin. It also alters what was the original setting in China to include foreign characters and locations, particularly in the United Kingdom.

This was Benioff and Weiss' first television project since the conclusion of their series Game of Thrones (2011–2019). It received positive reviews, with praise towards its cast, ambition, and production values. The series received six Primetime Emmy Award nominations, including Outstanding Drama Series. In May 2024, the series was renewed for a second and third season. The second season is set to premiere on January 14, 2027.

== Premise ==
Chinese astrophysicist Ye Wenjie runs into trouble with the authorities after witnessing her father's death during a struggle session in the Cultural Revolution. She is sent to a secret military base because of her scientific background, where she is racing against other countries to make first contact with aliens during the Cold War. While there, she makes a choice that affects humanity's future. In present-day London, a series of mysterious suicides and phenomena lead a government investigator and a group of friends called the "Oxford Five" into a mystery of extraterrestrial origin.

== Cast and characters ==
=== Main ===
- Jovan Adepo as Dr. Saul Durand, a research assistant and member of the "Oxford Five"
- John Bradley as Jack Rooney, an entrepreneur and member of the "Oxford Five"
- Rosalind Chao and Zine Tseng as Dr. Ye Wenjie, an astrophysicist whose spiteful decisions as a young scientist threaten the survival of humanity. Chao portrays the character in the 2020s, while Tseng portrays a younger version in scenes set in the past.
- Liam Cunningham as Thomas Wade, chief of the Secret Intelligence Service (MI6), who also heads the global Strategic Intelligence Agency
- Eiza González as Dr. Augustina "Auggie" Salazar, a nanotechnologist and member of the "Oxford Five"
- Jess Hong as Dr. Jin Cheng, a theoretical physicist and member of the "Oxford Five"
- Marlo Kelly as Tatiana Haas, a fanatic member of a group of humans working for the San-Ti, an extraterrestrial civilization
- Alex Sharp as Dr. Will Downing, a sixth form physics teacher and member of the "Oxford Five" who is diagnosed with stage 4 cancer early in the series
- Sea Shimooka as "Sophon", a sophisticated intelligence platform used by the San-Ti to communicate with humanity
- Saamer Usmani as Prithviraj Varma, a Royal Navy officer and Cheng's boyfriend
- Benedict Wong as Clarence "Da" Shi, an MI6 officer working for Wade and the Strategic Intelligence Agency
- Jonathan Pryce as Mike Evans, a friend of Ye Wenjie since the 1960s who shares her view that humanity should be eliminated, and has become a prominent member of the small group of humans working for the San-Ti
  - Ben Schnetzer as young Mike Evans
- Claudia Doumit as Captain Van Rijn (season 2)
- Ellie de Lange as Ayla (season 2)

=== Recurring ===
- Gerard Monaco as Collins
- Adrian Edmondson as Denys Porlock
- John Dagleish as Felix
- Alfie Allen (season 2)
- David Yip (season 2)
- Jordan Sunshine (season 2)

=== Guest ===
- Vedette Lim as Vera Ye
- Yu Guming as Yang Weining
- Lan Xiya as Tang Hongjing, a Red Guard
- Perry Yung as Ye Zhetai
- Li Fengxu as Shao Lin
- Guy Burnet as Rufus
- Eve Ridley as Follower
- Tom Wu as Count of The West
- Russell Yuen as Emperor Zhou
- Kevin Eldon as Thomas More
- Mark Gatiss as Isaac Newton
- Reece Shearsmith as Alan Turing
- Conleth Hill as Pope Gregory XIII
- Jenson Cheng as Kublai Khan
- Phil Wang as Aristotle
- Adrian Greensmith as Galileo Galilei
- Nitin Ganatra as Ranjit Varma
- Aidan Cheng as Reg
- Naoko Mori as Marie Curie
- Jason Forbes as Omar Khayyam
- CCH Pounder as Secretary-General Lillian Joseph
- Hélène Vivies as Lecompte
- Stephen Rahman-Hughes as Anwar Suleiman
- Bea Svistunenko as Laeticia
- Bilal Hasna as Edgar
- Dustin Demri-Burns as Ted
- Mitya Savelau as Dr. Peter Demikhov
- Jim Howick as Harry
- Florence Bell as Roxanne
- Josh Brener as Sebastian Kent
- Lily Newmark as Nora
- Bobak Ferdowsi as Mission Director

== Episodes ==
Season	Episodes	Originally released
1	8	March 21, 2024
2	6	January 14, 2027

=== Season 1 (2024) ===
No. overall	No. in season	Title	Directed by	Written by	Original release date
1	1	"Countdown"	Derek Tsang	David Benioff & D. B. Weiss & Alexander Woo	March 21, 2024
In 1960s China during the Cultural Revolution, Ye Wenjie witnesses her father being beaten to death in a struggle session. After she is discovered to be in possession of a copy of Silent Spring, which was banned, Ye is transferred to a remote military base with a large radio telescope dish intended for interstellar communications. In present day UK, Oxford physicist Vera Ye (the daughter of Ye Wenjie) dies by suicide. A group of Vera's former physics students — Auggie Salazar, Jack Rooney, Jin Cheng, Saul Durand, and Will Downing — discuss how recent science experiments have stopped making sense. Clarence "Da" Shi, a British detective working for the Strategic Intelligence Agency, comes across multiple suicides by scientists, several of whom possessed an impossibly advanced virtual reality (VR) gaming headset. Ye Wenjie offers Vera's VR headset to physicist Jin. Auggie, a materials scientist, starts seeing a countdown timer – visible only to her – floating in her line of vision. An unknown woman (later revealed as Tatiana) tells Auggie to abandon her breakthrough nanofiber research if she wants the countdown to disappear. The woman also tells Auggie to watch the sky at midnight. The night sky ends up flashing a pattern that matches Auggie's countdown timer, violating all known laws of physics.
2	2	"Red Coast"	Derek Tsang	Rose Cartwright	March 21, 2024
After successfully demonstrating her nanofiber technology, Auggie orders the research to be halted, after which the countdown timer disappears from her vision. Using the VR headset from Ye, Jin advances through the 3 Body video game. She shows the headset to Jack, only for the interface to swiftly reject him. Later, a similar headset is delivered to his home with an invitation to play the game. Will confides in Jack that he is dying of pancreatic cancer. In 1970s China, Ye Wenjie continues her work at the SETI site and realizes that the sun can amplify radio signals. However, a colleague claims ownership of her proposal to exploit that possibility, and she is chastised for not rejecting it due to the symbolism of Mao Zedong being China's "Red Sun". Ye spitefully, and clandestinely, implements the plan regardless, broadcasting a message to the universe. She later meets Mike Evans, a radical environmentalist, and receives a radio response from a pacifist alien warning her not to make contact again, as the other aliens on that planet would be eager to invade Earth. Disillusioned with the world, Ye replies anyway, saying humanity can no longer save itself and that she will help the aliens gain control of Earth.
3	3	"Destroyer of Worlds"	Andrew Stanton	Alexander Woo	March 21, 2024
In the present, Auggie discovers Jack's gaming headset and tries it on, only to be violently ejected. Distraught, she demands Jin and Jack stop playing, but they press on. When Auggie powers up her nanofiber project, the countdown returns and she again hastily shuts the project down. Within the game, Jin and Jack collaborate and complete levels 2 and 3. It is revealed the headset is actually a recruitment tool used by Mike Evans, who is now a wealthy oil tycoon and has been communicating regularly with the aliens. Level 4 takes place in the real world; Jack and Jin meet Tatiana, who does not appear on any surveillance cameras. In the game, they are shown the alien civilization's evolution in a star system containing a three body problem four light years away and their subsequent departure for Earth. Jack rejects this narrative and asks to leave. He is allowed to but is later murdered at his house by Tatiana. Neither Clarence, who's staking out Jack's house, nor any of the 18 interior security cameras can sense Tatiana's presence.
4	4	"Our Lord"	Minkie Spiro	Madhuri Shekar	March 21, 2024
In 1984, somewhere in the North Atlantic, Evans takes Ye Wenjie to his ship, Judgment Day, a vessel from which they can use advanced satellite technology to communicate with the aliens, who are called San-Ti (Trisolarans). In 2024, following Jack's murder, Thomas Wade (Clarence's superior) and Clarence enlist Jin's help in infiltrating Evans' secret organization to collect intelligence. Under Wade and Clarence's guidance, Jin attends a secret countryside meeting where Ye Wenjie reveals herself to be its leader and that the purpose of the Earth-Trisolaris movement is to help the San-Ti arrive and take over the Earth. British security forces raid the meeting. After realizing Jin is a spy, Tatiana attempts to assassinate her, sparking a shootout. Tatiana escapes but Ye Wenjie and most of the cultists are captured or shot. Meanwhile, Evans tells the story of Little Red Riding Hood and the Big Bad Wolf to a San-Ti liaison. However, the San-Ti struggle to understand the concept of fiction. The liaison chillingly interprets the story as a testament to human deception and claims they cannot coexist with humanity.
5	5	"Judgment Day"	Minkie Spiro	David Benioff & D. B. Weiss	March 21, 2024
Clarence interrogates Ye Wenjie, who claims the San-Ti allowed her to be captured because she is no longer needed. Evans' ship, Judgment Day, is scheduled to go through the Panama Canal. Wade enlists Auggie and a Royal Navy team — headed by Raj, Jin's boyfriend — to obtain the data onboard. Auggie's nanofibers are used to horizontally slice through the ship, killing everyone aboard. Wade's team locates the data disk and tries to decrypt it, which the San-Ti allow. Wade plays Ye Wenjie the recording of the San-Ti's confusion over humanity's ability to lie. Jin and Wade open a file in the data disk using the VR headsets. The San-Ti avatar are using a pair of Sophons – each a single proton, unfolded in a high-dimension to massive size, forming a sentient supercomputer – to cause the anomalous effects observed in particle accelerators and in people's vision, while allowing instantaneous communication with their fleet. The avatar details how crippling Earth's scientific advancement will prevent humans from technologically surpassing them before they arrive. A Sophon expands to envelop the planet, while displaying the message "YOU ARE BUGS" on all electronic displays on Earth, revealing the existence and power of the San-Ti.
6	6	"The Stars Our Destination"	Minkie Spiro	Alexander Woo	March 21, 2024
The "Eye in the Sky" incident causes worldwide panic. Wade and the PDC (Planetary Defense Council) gather a group of experts to discuss how to intercept the San-Ti fleet. It is established that if a probe were to reach at least 1% light speed, it would intercept the incoming ships in 200 years, giving Earth 200 years' advance knowledge. Jin proposes the Staircase Project, using a thousand nuclear bombs as propulsion sources for a probe with radiation sails. Based on Raj's performance in Panama, he is granted permission to join the PDC. Auggie, repulsed by the deadly use of her nanofibers against Judgment Day, becomes depressed and reluctant to further assist the PDC. Clarence asks Ye Wenjie why Vera Ye committed suicide, to which she responds that Vera discovered her mother's dealings with the San-Ti through Ye Wenjie's correspondence with Evans. Clarence releases Ye Wenjie and assigns an officer to keep track of her whereabouts. Due to his illness and medication, Will hallucinates and reflects on his unrequited love towards Jin. As a result, he visits The Stars Our Destination Foundation to purchase the star DX3906 for her.
7	7	"Only Advance"	Jeremy Podeswa	David Benioff & D. B. Weiss	March 21, 2024
The ownership certificate of star DX3906 is sent anonymously to Jin. Wade demonstrates cryogenic technology to PDC members, reviving a chimpanzee who had been in cryo-sleep. He plans to enter cryo-sleep himself to be present when the San-Ti arrive in 400 years, stating that humanity can "Only advance." Due to insufficient nuclear bombs for use as propulsion, the maximum payload of the interstellar probe will only be enough to hold a human brain. Auggie makes her nanofiber research public and leaves the country. Given Will's imminent death from cancer, Wade suggests he fill the candidacy as the brain in the Staircase Project. Ye Wenjie meets with Saul and attempts to pass on her knowledge about cosmic sociology in the form of a joke that the San-Ti will have difficulty deciphering, saying, "Don't play with God." Will consents to the Staircase Project and euthanizes himself with Saul at his side. Jin, discovering DX3906 was a gift from Will, rushes to the hospital only to find his brain has already been extracted. Ye Wenjie flies back to China and visits the Red Coast dish site, intent on committing suicide, but is stopped by Tatiana, who offers to kill her peacefully on orders from the San-Ti. The two watch one final sunset together.
8	8	"Wallfacer"	Jeremy Podeswa	David Benioff & D. B. Weiss	March 21, 2024
After a one-night stand, Saul's lover is hit by an errant car and dies in front of him. Clarence's investigation reveals that it was a San-Ti assassination attempt, with Saul as the intended victim. Saul is taken into protective custody and flown to the United Nations, where the Wallfacer Project is announced. Saul is selected as one of three Wallfacers who are each tasked to develop a plan to defeat the San-Ti contained entirely within their own minds, as the San-Ti are unable to read minds. Saul tries to reject his position and leaves the UN, only to be shot by a sniper. He survives thanks to his bulletproof clothing and reconsiders why the San-Ti want him dead. Wade and Jin oversee the Staircase Project, where Will's cryogenically frozen brain is launched into space, in hope that the San-Ti will intercept and reconstruct his body with it. Shortly after the detonation sequence starts, the sail malfunctions and sends the probe off course. The San-Ti liaison taunts Wade for his failure. Clarence takes a despondent Jin and similarly depressive Saul to see a swarm of cicadas, insects that have survived despite humanity's decades-long attempts to eradicate them, implying humanity has the same resilience.

=== Season 2 ===
No. overall	No. in season	Title	Directed by	Written by	Original release date
9	1	TBA	TBA	David Benioff & D. B. Weiss & Alexander Woo	January 14, 2027
10	2	TBA	TBA	Rose Cartwright	January 14, 2027
11	3	TBA	TBA	Alexander Woo	January 14, 2027
12	4	TBA	TBA	Nichelle Tramble Spellman	January 14, 2027
13	5	TBA	TBA	David Benioff & D. B. Weiss	January 14, 2027
14	6	TBA	TBA	David Benioff & D. B. Weiss	January 14, 2027

== Production ==
=== Development ===
It was announced in September 2020 that David Benioff and D. B. Weiss were developing a television adaptation of the novel at Netflix, with Alexander Woo co-writing alongside them. Benioff and Weiss have said they are prepared to adapt the whole trilogy, which they expect to require three or four seasons.

On December 25, 2020, Lin Qi, founder of Yoozoo Games and an executive producer on 3 Body Problem, died after ingesting a poisoned beverage, with four others becoming ill. An executive at Yoozoo Games, Xu Yao, was sentenced to death for murder in March 2024, the day after the series premiered on Netflix. Lin had purchased the rights to the book franchise and hired Xu Yao, a lawyer, in 2017, to manage the rights to Liu's novels; the poisonings were an attempt by Xu to take control of the subsidiary company that owned the rights to the series. On May 15, 2024, Netflix renewed the series for a second season. On May 31, 2024, Benioff, Weiss and Woo confirmed that the series was renewed for seasons 2–3 during the official Television Academy 3 Body Problem panel at the Netflix FYSEE space at Sunset Las Palmas in Los Angeles.

According to Benioff, he had already worked with UK-based staff for Game of Thrones and wanted to use them in this production, and Benioff stated that the need to coordinate among those staff influenced the choice of the UK as a setting in 3 Body Problem.

=== Casting ===
In August 2021, Eiza González entered negotiations to join the cast. The same month, Derek Tsang was hired to direct the pilot episode. González would be confirmed as joining the cast by that October, with additional castings including Benedict Wong, Tsai Chin, John Bradley, Liam Cunningham and Jovan Adepo. In June 2022, Jonathan Pryce, Rosalind Chao, Ben Schnetzer and Eve Ridley were added to cast. In November 2025, Claudia Doumit, Ellie de Lange, Alfie Allen, David Yip, and Jordan Sunshine joined to the cast for the second season.

=== Filming ===
Production on the series began on November 8, 2021, with principal photography taking place in the United Kingdom. Filming took place in London over a nine-month shoot between October 2021 and mid 2022. At Netflix's Tudum 2022 event, Alexander Woo, David Benioff, and D.B. Weiss announced that the production of the first season was completed. Netflix reportedly spent $20 million per episode, for a total budget of $160 million for the first season.

Filming of season two started November 26, 2025, in Budapest, Hungary, with season three reportedly planned to be filmed back-to-back with season 2.

== Release ==
Promotional poster of the series

3 Body Problem was released on Netflix on March 21, 2024. A companion podcast to be hosted by Jason Concepcion and Maggie Aderin-Pocock was also announced alongside it. On January 10, 2024, SXSW Film & TV Festival announced 3 Body Problem as the Opening Night TV Premiere. The second season is scheduled to premiere on January 14, 2027.

== Reception ==
=== Critical response ===
The review aggregator Rotten Tomatoes reported a 78% approval rating with an average rating of 6.9/10, based on 115 critic reviews. The website's critics' consensus reads, "Tackling its ambitious source material with impressive gusto, 3 Body Problem's first season proves a solid start that should leave sci-fi fans eager for more." Metacritic assigned it a score of 70 out of 100, based on 42 critics, indicating "generally favorable reviews".

Cindy White of The A.V. Club gave the series a B+ and said, "It may wear the garb of prestige television, but underneath it's just a nerdy science-fiction show, with a healthy emphasis on the science." Reviewing the series for USA Today, Kelly Lawler gave a rating of 3/4 and wrote, "Benioff, Weiss and Woo took a book trilogy known more for its thought experiments in philosophy and theoretical physics than its plot and made a solid bit of hard sci-fi that is (mostly) accessible to more casual fans of the genre." Eric Deggans of NPR commented, "As the characters in 3 Body Problem lurch toward answers, we all get to bask in an ambitious narrative fueling an ultimately impressive tale. Just remember to be patient as the series sets the stage early on." Wenlei Ma of The Nightly described the series as "Ambitious, towering and crammed with big ideas about intellectual curiosity, exploration and our place in the universe while still managing to tell intimate stories about human relationships." Inkoo Kang of The New Yorker gave a positive review, writing "The Netflix adaptation of Liu Cixin's trilogy mixes heady theoretical questions with genuine spectacle and heart."

Ben Travers of IndieWire gave a critical review, writing that "3 Body Problem is a sprawling drag, at turns disorienting in its use of inconsistent CGI to convey the story's momentousness and aggravating in its approach to character development and existential quandaries. The plot is easy enough to track, but the relief of realizing you can keep up with this motley crew of scientist pals—as they try to figure out why so many of their peers are dying off—is short-lived." Charles Pulliam-Moore of The Verge gave a mixed review, writing that "though David Benioff, D. B. Weiss, and Alexander Woo's 3 Body Problem is impressive, it really feels like just an introduction to Cixin Liu's deeper ideas." He opined that future seasons could explore the world of Liu's later novels.

=== Response in China ===
3 Body Problem received a mixed response in China. While Netflix is blocked there, viewers can use VPNs to circumvent geo-restrictions or view pirated versions. According to The Guardian, the 3 Body Problem hashtag had been read 2.3 billion times and discussed 1.424 million times on the Chinese social media platform Weibo. Viewers criticised the racebending and gender swapping of several protagonists, cultural appropriation, as well as the "dumbing-down" of concepts to appeal to non-Chinese audiences, and compared it unfavorably with the 2023 Chinese television adaptation, which received much critical acclaim there. The Chinese film review website Mtszimu praised the Netflix adaptation as "not only a new interpretation of Liu Cixin's original work but also an important contribution to global science-fiction literature". China Military Online, the official newspaper of the People's Liberation Army, criticized the series for retaining Chinese villains while doing away with portrayals of the country's modern development.

In response to social media criticism about racebending, cast member Benedict Wong said that Liu had given the showrunners his blessing to move the story towards a global one. Wong also cited the presence of several Asian cast members including himself, Jess Hong, Rosalind Chao and Zine Tseng. Hong and Chao also said that the Netflix adaptation preserved the novel's depiction of the Cultural Revolution and its legacy. Hong said that the adaptation sought to "globalize a story that was very heavily Eastern-focused into a Western perspective, a global perspective. Because, we're all from different countries, for the actors, you get to pull in all of these brilliant storylines into one emotional core, which is quite brilliant."

Aja Romano of Vox suggested that the media exaggerated Chinese social media nationalistic outrage against the Netflix show. They found that the Chinese audience "praising the show and criticizing it in equal parts", and shared similar critical commentary to the ones from the Western audience, underscoring that criticism of the show is universal.

The original author, Liu Cixin, commented on the series, saying, "I enjoyed the part of the series where many characters were added, and their relationships were explored. However, it was strange how all these characters seemed to know each other already. Fighting against the alien invasion should be a collective effort of all humanity, but instead, it was depicted as if a group of classmates were drafted to fight against the aliens."

=== Depiction and interpretation ===
3 Body Problem contains a realistic depiction of a struggle session during the Chinese Cultural Revolution, which was met with divided opinions in China and the United States. In an interview, David Benioff told The Hollywood Reporter the show "isn't a commentary on cancel culture", but agreed the fiction has parallels with the contemporary sociopolitical landscape. Derek Tsang, the director of the first two episodes, was recruited due to his Chinese background to ensure the authenticity of the Cultural Revolution period. Tsang explained that the goal of the episode was to persuade the audience to empathize with the protagonist, Ye Wenjie, and understand her motivation and position in the story.

Joel Stein of The Hollywood Reporter noted the Cultural Revolution scene sparked split interpretations from American liberal and conservative viewers, with conservatives viewing it as a commentary against cancel culture and leftist movements, and liberal viewers finding the scenes as a warning against conservative populism and Denialism.

=== Accolades ===
Award	Date of ceremony	Category	Recipients	Result	Ref.
Gotham TV Awards	June 4, 2024	Outstanding Performance in a Drama Series	Zine Tseng	Won	
Set Decorators Society of America Awards	August 5, 2024	Best Achievement in Décor/Design of a One Hour Fantasy or Science Fiction Series	Andrew McCarthy, Deborah Riley	Nominated	
Black Reel Awards	August 23, 2024	Outstanding Guest Performance in a Drama Series	CCH Pounder	Nominated	
Primetime Creative Arts Emmy Awards	September 7–8, 2024	Outstanding Cinematography for a Series (One Hour)	Martin Ahlgren ("Judgment Day")	Nominated	
Primetime Creative Arts Emmy Awards	September 7–8, 2024	Outstanding Main Title Design	Patrick Clair and Raoul Marks, creative directors; Eddy Herringson, designer	Nominated	
Primetime Creative Arts Emmy Awards	September 7–8, 2024	Outstanding Picture Editing for a Drama Series	Michael Ruscio ("Judgment Day")	Nominated	
Primetime Creative Arts Emmy Awards	September 7–8, 2024	Outstanding Sound Editing for a Comedy or Drama Series (One-Hour)	Tim Kimmel, Paula Fairfield, John Matter, Tim Hands, Bradley C. Katona, Justin Helle, David Klotz, Stefan Fraticelli, Jason Charbonneau ("Judgment Day")	Nominated	
Primetime Creative Arts Emmy Awards	September 7–8, 2024	Outstanding Sound Mixing for a Comedy or Drama Series (One-Hour)	Marc Fishman, Danielle Dupre, Richard Dyer ("Judgment Day")	Nominated	
Primetime Emmy Awards	September 15, 2024	Outstanding Drama Series	3 Body Problem	Nominated	
Astra TV Awards	December 8, 2024	Best Streaming Drama Series	3 Body Problem	Nominated	
Astra TV Awards	December 8, 2024	Best Supporting Actor in a Streaming Drama Series	Benedict Wong	Nominated	
Astra TV Awards	December 8, 2024	Best Supporting Actress in a Streaming Drama Series	Eiza González	Nominated	
Astra TV Awards	December 8, 2024	Best Directing in a Streaming Drama Series	Derek Tsang (for "Countdown")	Nominated	
Astra TV Awards	December 8, 2024	Best Writing in a Streaming Drama Series	David Benioff, D. B. Weiss, and Alexander Woo (for "Countdown")	Nominated	
American Cinema Editors Awards	January 18, 2025	Best Edited Drama Series	Michael Ruscio (for "Judgment Day")	Nominated	
Artios Awards	February 12, 2025	Outstanding Achievement in Casting – Television Pilot and First Season Drama	Nina Gold, Robert Sterne	Nominated	
Saturn Awards	February 2, 2025	Best Science Fiction Television Series	3 Body Problem	Nominated	
Visual Effects Society Awards	February 11, 2025	Outstanding Effects Simulations in an Episode, Commercial, Game Cinematic or Real-Time Project	Yves D'Incau, Gavin Templer, Martin Chabannes, Eloi Andaluz Fullà (for "Judgment Day")	Nominated	
