= Vedette Lim =

American actress

Vedette Lim (born November 14, 1979) is an American actress.

== Early life ==
Lim was born in Arizona and raised in Seattle, Washington. After graduating from high school, she moved to New York City and studied at the Tisch School of the Arts at New York University.

== Career ==
Following her studies at Tisch, Lim primarily worked in theater and commercials. Her television debut came in 2007 with a role in ABC's Six Degrees. In 2008, she played a small role as Amy on the CBS soap opera As the World Turns.

In 2009, Lim moved to Los Angeles to further pursue her acting career. In 2010, she landed roles in various television series, including Love Bites, Franklin & Bash, Medium and Parenthood.

She later appeared in several independent and short films before being cast as Naomi, Tara Thornton's love interest, in the fourth season of HBO's True Blood in 2011. That same year, she appeared alongside Natalie Portman and Ashton Kutcher in Ivan Reitman's romantic comedy No Strings Attached.

Since then, Lim has guest-starred in many popular television shows, including as Dr. Polly Preston, Arizona's prospective pediatric surgery fellow in Grey's Anatomy. She has also voiced a character in the Halo 4 video game.

In 2013, she joined the cast of Chicago Fire in a recurring role as Devon, the girlfriend of paramedic Leslie Shay (Lauren German).

Since 2019, she has portrayed FBI analyst Elise Taylor in the CBS series FBI. Also in 2019, she appeared as Sharon Lim in the series Magnum P.I.

As of 2024, she stars in the Netflix series 3 Body Problem as Vera Ye.

== Filmography ==
=== Film ===
Year	Title	Role	Notes
2005	Pirates vs. Ninjas	The Ninja	Short
2009	Kicking the Dog	Erin	
2009	The Sunset Sky	Abbey	
2009	Midnight Ride	Dulcinea	Short
2011	No Strings Attached	Lisa	
2012	Broadway's Finest	Waitress	
2013	The Night Visitor	Fanny	
2014	Looking for Mr. Right	Rachel	TV movie
2015	750	Wife	Short
2016	Psychophonia	Lilly	
2016	The Night Visitor 2: Heather's Story	Fanny	
2019	Intermate	Angel	

=== Television ===
Year	Title	Role	Notes
2006	SportsFigures	Herself/Host	Episode: "Liquid Energy"
2007	Six Degrees	Rachel	Episode: "Get a Room"
2008	As the World Turns	Amy	Regular Cast
2008	In the Now	Vedette	Recurring Cast
2010	The Forgotten	Sandra	Episode: "My John"
2010	Victorious	Female Teacher	Episode: "Pilot"
2010	Parenthood	Waitress	Episode: "What's Goin' On Down There?"
2010	Medium	Paramedic	Episode: "How to Kill a Good Guy"
2011	Love Bites	Megan	Episode: "Keep on Truckin'"
2011	Franklin & Bash	Rachel Dawson	Episode: "Bachelor Party"
2011	True Blood	Naomi	Recurring Cast: Season 4
2011	Grey's Anatomy	Dr. Polly Preston	Episode: "Heart-Shaped Box"
2012	Femme Fatales	Agent Pam	Episode: "Killer Instinct"
2012	Hollywood Heights	Detective Paula McCarthy	Recurring Cast
2012	Wedding Band	Debra	Episode: "We Are Family"
2013-14	Chicago Fire	Devon	Recurring Cast: Season 2
2014	Stalker	Shelly Walker	Episode: "Crazy for You"
2015	Scorpion	Sarah Jacobs	Episode: "Cliffhanger"
2015	Hawaii Five-0	Dr. Isabelle Lono	Episode: "Mai ho`oni i ka wai lana mālie"
2016	Castle	Meadow	Episode: "The Blame Game"
2016	Bones	Alex Conrad	Episode: "The Head in the Abutment"
2016	Code Black	Liz Harington	Episode: "Landslide"
2017	Animal Kingdom	Heather	Recurring Cast: Season 2
2019	The Good Doctor	Grace Lee	Episode: "Xin"
2019	Magnum P.I.	Sharon Lim	Episode: "Honor Among Thieves"
2019	Bull	ADA Selma Rivers	Episode: "Imminent Danger"
2019 - present	FBI	FBI Analyst Elise Taylor	Recurring Cast: Season 2- present
2020	The Undoing	Amanda Emory	Recurring Cast
2023	FBI: International	FBI Analyst Elise Taylor	Episode: "Imminent Threat: Part One"
2024	3 Body Problem	Vera Ye	Recurring Cast

=== Video games ===
Year	Title	Role
2008	Army of Two	Murray/Reporter (voice)
2012	Halo 4	Palmer (voice)
