= SportsFigures =

1995–2007 American educational television series

SportsFigures is an American educational television series for middle and high school aged teenagers produced by ESPN in association with Factory Films Inc. that aired from 1995 to 2007 on ESPN2. The program uses sports to teach physics, general science and math. Major sports celebrities join the host in a quest to find the answer to a sports/physical phenomenon. Why does a curveball curve? What's the perfect launch angle for a snowboard jump? How can you have an ice skating rink in Southern California?

The show was the brain-child of George Bodenheimer, then vice president, now Executive Chairman of sports network ESPN.

First broadcast in 1995, 84 half hours have presented over 160 different topics. Sports celebrities on the show have included Tiger Woods, Tony Hawk, Derek Jeter, Jeff Gordon, Jeanette Lee (The Black Widow), Amanda Beard, Julie Foudy, Bob Burnquist, Vince Carter, Barry Larkin, Kenyon Martin, Lynn St. James, Reggie Jackson, Dave Mirra, Troy Glaus, Dan O'Brien, Benny Carter, Janet Evans, Chanda Rubin, Mike Richter, Pam McGee and Sascha Cohen among many others. The final year of production was 2007 though it continued airing in reruns through 2010.

== Production ==
“ESPN SportsFigures” was originally produced by Julie Anderson at Sea Lion Productions. The SportsFigures pilot was shot November 15, 1994 at the Ardsley, NY High School Basketball court. A Sea Lion production, Directed and co-produced by Mal Karlin . The topic was using statistical analysis to predict whether the next shot will be a basket or not a basket.

The show was written by A. Dean Bell and directed by Bell, Eric Rosenthal and Kim Nye Zeiss with Holly Faison as associate producer. The program's original educational consultant was Richard Rusczyk. After 1996 the show was written and directed exclusively by Bell at Black Canyon Productions and in 1997 Bell became executive producer along with Holly Faison. At this point the show moved to Highland Productions with JC Chmiel and Don Wells as co-executive producers and Peter Brancazio as educational consultant. Bell and Faison then formed New York-based Factory Films Inc. which produced the show from 1999 to 2007 in association with ESPN. Noted science educator Arthur Eisenkraft consulted the show from 1999 – 2007. The supervising producer at ESPN from 1995 - 2005 was Dennis Deninger and Dave Miller for 2005–2007.

The series aired on ESPN2 and then aired on ESPN Classic in reruns.

SportsFigures is broadcast as part of Cable in the Classroom. Cable in the Classroom is an industry initiative to air commercial-free educational programming in the late night hours which schools can tape and use with relaxed copyright regulation. Free teachers guides and lesson plans also accompany the shows. In 1999 ESPN together with the Go Network distributed 18,000 7 half-hour boxed sets of “ESPN SportsFigures” free to high schools across the USA. The event was announced at a reception for “ESPN SportsFigures” in the US Capitol hosted by Senator Trent Lott. Today, the program has been placed on YouTube by educators and is still used in schools across the country.

== Hosts ==
The original host of the series was educational consultant Richard Rusczyk. He was followed by stand-up comedian and actor Kevin Flynn and actress Marissa Copeland for the 1996 season. Copeland went on to share hosting duties with comedian Jacqui Malouf and actor Greg Abbey until 2007.

== Awards and honors ==
- 2008 NY Region Emmy Award – Educational Series
- 2007 Hugo Award (Chicago Int’l Film Festival) - Silver Plaque
- 2006 Hugo Awards (Chicago Int’l Film Festival) – Certificate of Merit
- 2005 Clarion Award – Best Children's Program Age 11 and Up
- 2003 Clarion Award – Best Children's Program Age 11 and Up
- 2000 Clarion Award - Best Children's Program Age 11 and Up
- 1999 Clarion Award – Best Children's Program Age 11 and Up
- 2007 Parents' Choice Award – Recommended
- 2006 Parents' Choice Award – Silver Honors
- 2003 Parents' Choice Awards – Silver Honors
- 2002 Parents' Choice Awards – Silver Honors
- 2001 Parents' Choice Awards – Recommended
- 2000 Parents' Choice Awards – Silver Honors
- 1998 Parents’ Choice Awards – Approved
- 1997 Parents’ Choice Awards - Silver Honors
- 2006 Telly Award – Bronze, Children's Programming
- 2000 Telly Award – Bronze, Informational Programming
- 1999 Telly Award – Bronze, Children's Programming
- 1999 Telly Award – Bronze, Informational Programming
- 1999 National Educational Media Network – Silver Apple Award
