= Zine Tseng =

Taiwanese actress (born 1993/1994)

- 曾靖
- Born: Zine Tseng; 1993 or 1994 (age 32–33); Tamsui District, New Taipei City, Taiwan
- Education: University of Southern California (BA)
- Occupation: Actress
- Years active: 2024–present

Chinese name
- Traditional Chinese: 曾靖
- Simplified Chinese: 曾靖
Transcriptions
Standard Mandarin
- Hanyu Pinyin: Zēng Jìng
- Wade–Giles: Tseng^{1} Ching^{4}
Yue: Cantonese
- Jyutping: Zang^{1} Zing^{6}
Southern Min
- Hokkien POJ: Tsan Tsīng

Zine Tseng (Chinese: 曾靖; born 1993/1994) is a Taiwanese actress. She has starred as Ye Wenjie in the Netflix sci-fi series 3 Body Problem and as Princess Gulun Shou'an in the Amazon Prime Video series Young Sherlock.

== Early life and education ==
Tseng was born in 1993 or 1994 in the Tamsui District of New Taipei City, Taiwan, to a Taiwanese father and Hunanese mother. She began practicing martial arts at a young age due to the influence of her grandfather, including learning Northern Praying Mantis and nunchucks. She split her time during childhood between Taiwan and China, then later moved to the United States where she completed high school. Tseng continued her studies at the USC School of Dramatic Arts in 2013 and graduated with a Bachelor of Arts in theater. From 2017 to 2019 she starred in David Henry Hwang's play Chinglish on the invitation of a friend, which sparked her interest in acting. Instead of returning to Taiwan to start a cafe in Taitung City as initially planned, she enrolled at USC again to pursue a Master of Fine Arts in acting and intended to pursue a career in stage performances. However, Tseng deferred her studies for a year in 2021 due to COVID-19; she ultimately quit the program in her second year when she was cast in 3 Body Problem.

== Career ==
Tseng made her onscreen acting debut with the Netflix sci-fi series 3 Body Problem, adapted from the Chinese novel of the same name. She shared a main role with Rosalind Chao, portraying the younger version of Ye Wenjie, a Chinese astrophysicist who contacted extraterrestrial beings during the Cultural Revolution. While still enrolled at USC in 2021, Tseng was invited by a classmate who majored in directing to audition for the role, and she was selected by director Derek Tsang from a pool of 3,000 contestants. She was required to move to London for an eight-month shoot, leading her to discontinue her master's studies. Her performance was critically acclaimed, with Palmer Haasch of Business Insider calling it "a brilliant debut performance" and Therese Lacson of Collider describing it as "magnificent", and it earned her Outstanding Performance in a Drama Series at the 1st Gotham TV Awards.

Tseng signed with Artist International Group in August 2023. In July 2024, Tseng was cast in a lead role as Princess Gulun Shou'an, a Chinese scholar and martial artist, in Guy Ritchie's Amazon Prime Video series Young Sherlock. In May 2026, she was cast in Ang Lee's historical epic Gold Mountain.

== Personal life ==
After the filming of 3 Body Problem, Tseng returned to Taiwan and is currently residing in the mountain regions of Tamsui.

== Filmography ==
=== Film ===
Year	Title	Role	Notes
TBA	Gold Mountain †	TBA	Filming

=== Television ===
Year	Title	Role	Notes
2024	3 Body Problem	Young Ye Wenjie	Main role; 4 episodes
2026	Young Sherlock	Princess Gulun Shou'an / Xiao Wei	Main role; 7 episodes

== Awards and nominations ==
Year	Award	Category	Work	Result	Ref.
2024	1st Gotham TV Awards	Outstanding Performance in a Drama Series	3 Body Problem	Won	
