= Minkie Spiro =

British cinema and TV director and producer

- Born: London
- Occupations: TV and film director, producer

Minkie Spiro is a British cinema and TV Director and Executive Producer.

== Career ==
Minkie Spiro is the daughter of Robin and Nitza Spiro. Her father is an ex-member of the Queen's Royal Irish Hussars. The spouses co-founded the Spiro Ark, a renowned Jewish education institute. Minkie Spiro, who has 5 sisters and a brother, grew up in St John’s Wood. She studied Graphic Design at Central St. Martins School of Art in London and worked as a photographer for BBC in the early 1990s. As a photojournalist, she covered the Bosnian War and Operation Solomon. She also worked for Channel 4. Later, she obtained a Masters degree in Film Directing from the Royal College of Art.

Her early film work includes The Boxer (1995), Strangers in Paradise (1996), and Rat Woman (1997). Her credits as a television director include Holby City, Better Call Saul, Downton Abbey, Call the Midwife, Skins, Doc Martin, Jessica Jones, and many more. In 2019, she directed the pilot of The Village. Spiro also served as an executive producer on the series.

In 2018, she became a BAFTA member. Spiro served as a member of the International Competition jury at 2025 Series Mania festival.

She directed four episodes of the mini-series All Her Fault for NBC Universal, which stars Sarah Snook and Dakota Fanning.

== Selected works ==
=== Cinema ===
- Rat Women short (1997)
- Tales from the reading room (2000)
- I Am Ruthie Segal, Hear Me Roar (2009)

=== TV Series ===
- Dead to Me (2019), episodes 5-6
- The Plot Against America (2020), Parts 1-3
- Fosse/Verdon (2019), episode "All I Care About Is Love"
- Pieces of Her, (2022), director and executive producer
- 3 Body Problem (2024), episodes 4-6
- Toxic Town (2025), director and executive producer
- All Her Fault (2025), director: episodes 1-4, executive producer

== Awards and nominations ==
- 2004 – BAFTA Best New Director (Fiction) nomination (for Holby City);
- 2019 – Directors Guild of America Outstanding Directing – Miniseries or TV Film nomination (for Fosse/Verdon episode All I Care About Is Love).
