= Saamer Usmani =

Pakistani-actor

- Born: 1989 or 1990 (age 35–36); Pakistan
- Occupation: Actor
- Spouse: Tedra Millan (m. 2022)
- Children: 1

Saamer Usmani (born 1989/1990) is a Pakistani–Canadian actor, best known for his recurring role as Prithviraj Varma in the television series 3 Body Problem. He has also appeared in the television series Reign, What/If, Succession, Inventing Anna and Katy Keene, and the film The Mauritanian.

In 2024 he starred in Amar Wala's film Shook.

== Biography ==
Usmani was born in 1989 or 1990 in Pakistan and moved to the United States when he was 13 where he attended Groton School in Massachusetts. He attended the University of Toronto where he studied sociology, anthropology, and political science but left after 2 years to appear in his first play. He then attended the London Academy of Music and Dramatic Art where he received formal training.
