= Alex Sharp =

English actor (born 1989)

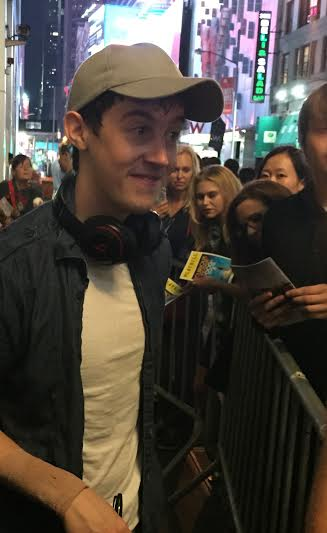
- Sharp signing autographs at the stage door of The Curious Incident of the Dog in the Night-Time in 2015
- Born: 1988 or 1989 (age 37–38); Westminster, London, England
- Education: Yeovil College; Juilliard School (BFA)
- Occupation: Actor
- Years active: 2014–present

Alexander Ian Sharp (born 1988/1989) is an English actor. He is known for originating the role of Christopher Boone in the Broadway production of The Curious Incident of the Dog in the Night-Time. He is also known to a wider audience as Will Downing in 3 Body Problem.

After graduating from the Juilliard School in the summer of 2014, he made his Broadway and acting debut in the play The Curious Incident of the Dog in the Night-Time in the autumn. For his role as the autistic teenager Christopher Boone, he was awarded the Tony Award for Best Actor in a Play, Drama Desk Award for Outstanding Actor in a Play, and the Outer Critics Circle Award.

== Early life and education ==
Sharp was born circa 1988/1989, and was raised travelling throughout Europe and the Southwest of the United States in a caravan, before moving to east Devon, England, age eight. He was educated by his mother, a teacher, and his father, who worked in real estate, until the family moved back to England. He has a sister, Nicole, also highly successful in her own field. His mother homeschooled him with both "rigorous and unorthodox" lessons. Upon his return to east Devon, he was unable to adjust easily to a traditional school environment, and eventually left England aged 18.

Sharp wanted to be an actor from an early age. According to the Irish Mirror, his acting debut was at age 4 when he appeared in A Touch of Frost for £10. According to The Daily Beast, at age 7, he made his acting debut as Piglet in Winnie-the-Pooh. He also did extensive regional theatre work at the Northcott Theatre in Exeter. Sharp studied Performing Arts at Yeovil College in Yeovil, Somerset and attended Beaminster Comprehensive School in Dorset.

In 2008, Sharp went to North America and worked as a carpenter and handyman, and in call centres often, in Canada. At times, he travelled to Latin America to pursue physical activities.

When working on a house in Montreal, Sharp decided that he wanted to become an actor. He asked a friend what the best theatre schools were, and the friend told him Yale and Juilliard. Sharp decided on Juilliard due to its location in the middle of Manhattan, and he auditioned with a scene from Hamlet. Against school rules, he also performed a scene from a play that he had written, claiming that it was the work of a little-known English playwright. He was accepted to Juilliard and attended the Drama Division's Group 43. During his time at Juilliard, he wrote and directed a play that was an adaptation of A Clockwork Orange. He graduated from Juilliard with a Bachelor of Fine Arts degree in 2014.

== Career ==
After graduating from the Juilliard School in the summer of 2014, Sharp made his Broadway and acting debut in the play The Curious Incident of the Dog in the Night-Time in the autumn. For his role as the autistic teenager Christopher Boone, he was awarded the Tony Award for Best Actor in a Play, Drama Desk Award for Outstanding Actor in a Play, and the Outer Critics Circle Award. As of August 2015, he is the youngest winner of the Tony Award for Best Actor in a Play. Sharp's final performance of Curious Incident was 13 September 2015.

In 2017, he starred in John Cameron Mitchell's How to Talk to Girls at Parties, alongside Nicole Kidman, Elle Fanning, and Ruth Wilson. Also in 2017, Sharp starred alongside Lily Collins and Keanu Reeves in To the Bone, directed by Marti Noxon. To the Bone was released on Netflix on 14 July 2017. The semi-autobiographical movie garnered some controversy regarding its depiction of eating disorders, to which Sharp responded, "I think controversy is an interesting thing in that it usually goes hand in hand with starting conversations that surround taboo or under-discussed topics that need to be discussed and need to be less in the shadows. I would hope that [To the Bone] just creates an awareness and encourages people to talk about [eating disorders]".

Sharp co-starred as activist Rennie Davis in Aaron Sorkin's feature film, The Trial of the Chicago 7, in 2020, alongside Eddie Redmayne, Sacha Baron Cohen, and Joseph Gordon-Levitt. He was also set to star as an unspecified lead part in HBO's untitled Game of Thrones prequel alongside Naomi Watts. Sharp appears in one of the principal supporting roles in the 2022 Oliver Hermanus/Kazuo Ishiguro film Living, starring Bill Nighy.

== Acting credits ==
=== Film ===
Year	Title	Role	Notes
2017	To the Bone	Luke	
2017	How to Talk to Girls at Parties	Enn	
2018	Better Start Running	Harley	
2018	UFO	Derek Echevaro	
2019	The Sunlit Night	Yasha	
2019	The Hustle	Thomas Westerburg	
2020	The Trial of the Chicago 7	Rennie Davis	
2022	Living	Mr Wakeling	
2023	One Life	Trevor Chadwick	

=== Television ===
Year	Title	Role	Notes
2020	The Good Lord Bird	Preacher	Episode: "A Wicked Plot"
2024	3 Body Problem	Will Downing	

=== Theatre ===
Year	Title	Role	Location	Category
2014–2015	The Curious Incident of the Dog in the Night-Time	Christopher Boone	Ethel Barrymore Theatre	Broadway

== Awards and nominations ==
In 2015, he broke Harvey Fierstein's record as the youngest winner of the Tony Award for Best Actor in a Play. In addition to winning the Tony Award in 2015, he also won an Outer Critics Circle Award for Outstanding Leading Actor in a Play, a Theatre World Award in recognition of his Broadway debut. and the Drama Desk Award for Outstanding Actor in a Play. He also received a nomination for the distinguished performance award at the 2015 Drama League Awards. In addition he was nominated for the 2015 Fred and Adele Astaire Awards Outstanding Male Dancer for his work in The Curious Incident of the Dog in the Night-Time. He also won the 2014 Logo TV NewNowNext Awards for Best New Broadway Lead Actor.

Year	Work	Award(s)	Category	Result
2014	The Curious Incident of the Dog in the Night-Time	Drama Desk Awards	Outstanding Actor in a Play	Won
2014	The Curious Incident of the Dog in the Night-Time	Drama League Awards	Distinguished Performance Award	Nominated
2014	The Curious Incident of the Dog in the Night-Time	Fred and Adele Astaire Awards	Outstanding Male Dancer	Nominated
2014	The Curious Incident of the Dog in the Night-Time	Outer Critics Circle Awards	Outstanding Performance by a Leading Actor in a Play	Won
2014	The Curious Incident of the Dog in the Night-Time	Theatre World Awards	Outstanding Broadway Theatre Debut	Won
2014	The Curious Incident of the Dog in the Night-Time	Tony Awards	Best Actor in a Play	Won
2020	The Trial of the Chicago 7	Screen Actors Guild Awards	Outstanding Performance by a Cast in a Motion Picture	Won
