= Alexander Woo =

American screenwriter

Alexander Woo is a Chinese-American writer and producer, primarily known for his work on television. He is a co-creater, co-writer, and executive producer on 3 Body Problem (2024-present).

His work includes being a co-writer and executive producer on True Blood (2008–2014) and acting as co-creator, co-showrunner, co-writer, and executive producer for the second season of the anthology series The Terror, in 2019.

== Biography ==
=== Education ===
Woo studied creative writing at Princeton University. He subsequently attended the Yale School of Drama, where he earned an MFA in playwriting.

=== Career ===
Alexander Woo is a showrunner on the Netflix show 3 Body Problem, along with David Benioff and D.B. Weiss. The show is based on the similarly named Chinese novel series by Liu Cixin.

Woo also worked as a writer on the HBO drama series True Blood. In an interview, he describes the show's writing room:

Every writer's room is different. True Blood has a relatively small writing team, so the chemistry between the writers is crucial to the style and tone of the show. It's kind of like being on a jury, where you are sequestered together for long hours and many days and you figure things out together. Our team is a wonderful group of people, and even though the hours are long we all work really well and the hours just fly by.

Among Woo's credits for the show was a first-season episode that was notable for the "AIDS burger" monologue made famous by actor Nelsan Ellis. "In the hands and the mouth of Nelsan, he made that piece of dialogue sing," Woo told NPR after Ellis' death.

He has also written episodes of Manhattan, Sleeper Cell, LAX, and Wonderfalls and co-wrote HBO's adaptation of The Immortal Life of Henrietta Lacks. He was developing a series about civil rights in Birmingham, Alabama with AMC. He also worked as the showrunner and co-creator of the second season of AMC's anthology series The Terror.

In September 2020, it was announced that Woo, along with Game of Thrones co-creators David Benioff and D.B. Weiss, would adapt acclaimed Chinese novel The Three-Body Problem into a TV series for Netflix.

== Awards and nominations ==
Nominations

- 2009 Writers Guild of America Award for Best New Series – True Blood
- 2010 PGA Award for Television Producer of the Year Award in Episodic – True Blood
- 2010 Image Award for Outstanding Writing in a Dramatic Series – True Blood
- 2024 Most Impactful Asians A100 List by Gold House
