= Jovan Adepo =

British actor (born 1988)

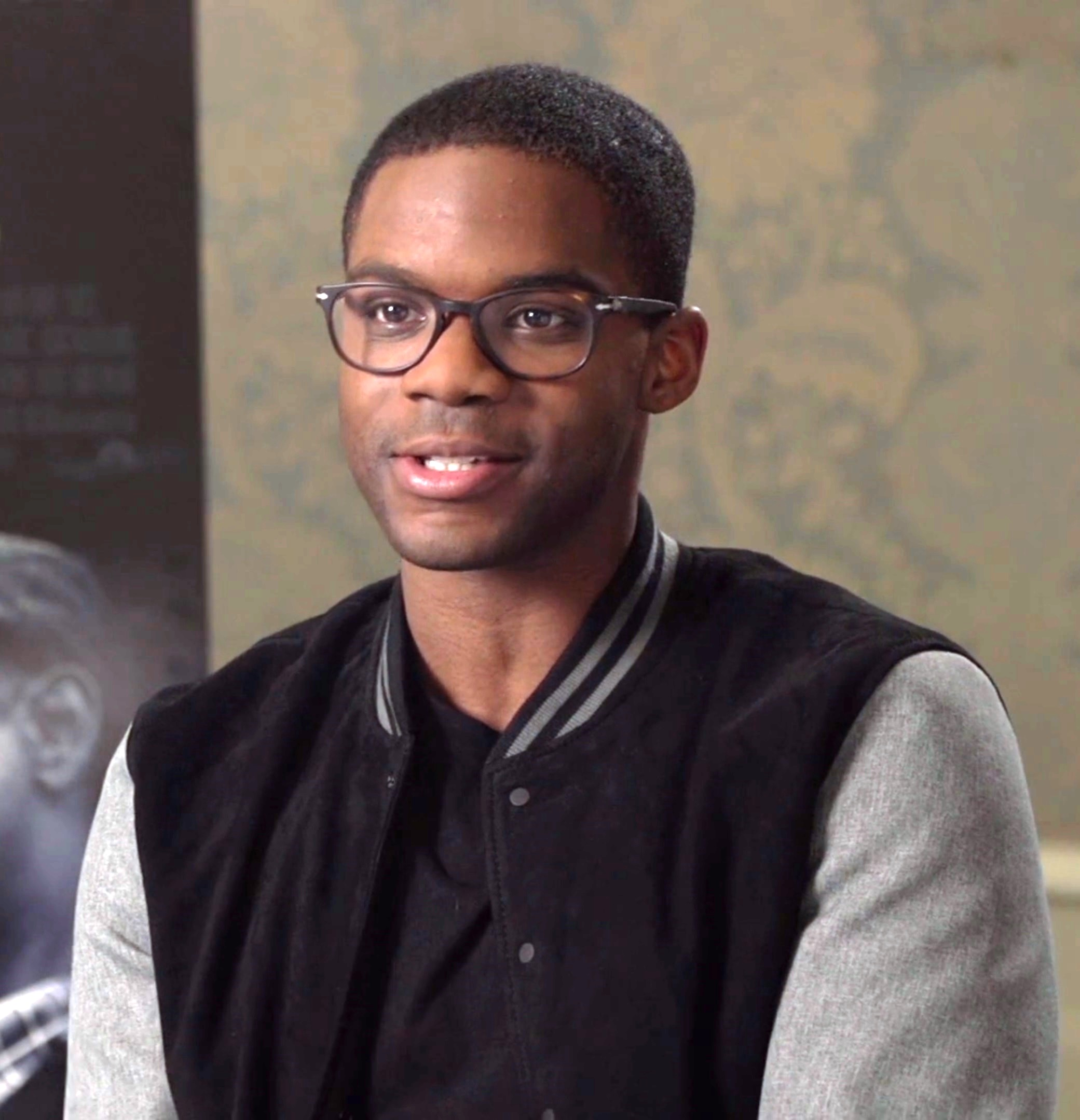
- Adepo in 2016
- Born: 6 September 1988 (age 38); Upper Heyford, Oxfordshire, England
- Education: Bowie State University (BA)
- Occupation: Actor
- Years active: 2012–present

Jovan Adepo (born 6 September 1988) is a British and American actor. He made his feature film debut in the period drama Fences (2016), which was followed by roles in the psychological horror film Mother! (2017), the action horror film Overlord (2018), the period comedy-drama Babylon (2022), and the drama His Three Daughters (2023).

Adepo also starred in the HBO supernatural drama series The Leftovers (2015–2017), the Facebook Watch drama series Sorry for Your Loss (2018–2019), the Amazon Prime Video action thriller series Jack Ryan (2019), the Netflix true crime miniseries When They See Us (2019), the HBO superhero miniseries Watchmen (2019), the CBS All Access fantasy miniseries The Stand (2020–2021), the Netflix science fiction series 3 Body Problem (2024) and the HBO horror series It: Welcome To Derry (2025). For his performance as Hooded Justice in Watchmen, he was nominated for the Primetime Emmy Award for Outstanding Supporting Actor in a Limited Series or Movie.

== Early life and education ==
Adepo was born in 1988 in Upper Heyford, Oxfordshire, England. His mother is a British Nigerian from London, while his father is an African American from Chattanooga, Tennessee. He holds dual American and British citizenship. His maternal grandfather Fatai Adepo was special adviser to former Nigerian President Olusegun Obasanjo. He moved to the United States with his family at age 2. Raised in Waldorf, Maryland, he acted in school and church plays.

He attended college at Bowie State University in Maryland, receiving his B.A. in political science and philosophy. While studying political science, he began taking creative writing classes.

== Career ==
=== Early workshops and roles ===
Adepo moved to Los Angeles in 2011 after receiving his bachelor's degree. He intended to become a writer, but he started conducting commercial workshops to supplement his income. He took acting classes in order to book commercials for extra income. His interest in acting grew. Adepo studied acting under the tutelage of a variety of notable instructors, including Ben Guillory of The Robey Theatre Company and Dianne Hull of the Actors Studio. Through church in Maryland, he had met Viola Davis's older sister, who helped him get in contact with Davis. Davis directed him to study techniques, attend plays, and read as many plays as he could.

=== Film and television roles ===
He was part of Live in Front of a Studio Audience: Norman Lear's All in the Family and The Jeffersons. He played the role of Lionel Jefferson. The special was conceptualized and hosted by Jimmy Kimmel, and the team took home the Emmy for Outstanding Variety Special (Live). In 2016 he starred in Fences alongside Viola Davis and Denzel Washington. In Fences, he stars as Cory Maxson, the son of the main characters played by Davis and Washington. Adepo was "the only member of the Fences cast who did not star in the play's 2010 Broadway revival before it made the jump to feature film."

In 2017, he appeared as the central character along with Wyatt Russell in Overlord, both playing American paratroopers confronted by Nazi super soldiers. By 2017, he was also a series regular on The Leftovers on HBO, appearing in the second and third seasons. Adepo performed in the 2017 horror film Mother! by Darren Aronofsky.

In May 2019, he appeared as the adult Antron McCray in When They See Us, nominated for an Emmy, about the Central Park Five. Adepo played the role of Larry Underwood in the 2020 miniseries adaptation of Stephen King's The Stand. In November 2019, he appeared as the central character in the sixth episode of Watchmen, playing the world's first superhero, Hooded Justice. Also in November 2019, he was in an unreleased independent film called Violent Heart, to be released in 2020. He was named one of Dazed Magazine's "Dazed 100".

In March 2021, he was cast to star in Babylon. In 2024, Adepo co-starred as one of the major characters in the Netflix science-fiction series "3 Body Problem." He will reprise his role in at least one of the two new seasons greenlit by Netflix.

== Filmography ==
=== Film ===
Year	Title	Role	Notes	Ref.
2016	Fences	Cory Maxson		
2017	Mother!	Cupbearer		
2018	Overlord	Private Edward Boyce		
2019	The Planters	Jesus (voice)		
2020	The Violent Heart	Daniel		
2021	5150	Celeb	Short film	
2022	Babylon	Sidney Palmer		
2023	To Catch a Killer	Jack McKenzie		
2023	His Three Daughters	Benjy		
2026	The Odyssey	Elpenor		

=== Television ===
Year	Title	Role	Notes	Ref.
2014	Blood Relatives	Dushaan Jackson	Episode: "House of Lies"	
2015–2017	The Leftovers	Michael Murphy	Main role (seasons 2–3)	
2016	NCIS: Los Angeles	Emmanuel Salim	Episode: "Revenge Deferred"	
2018–2019	Sorry for Your Loss	Danny Greer	Main role	
2019	Jack Ryan	Marcus Bishop	Main role (season 2); 8 episodes	
2019	Live in Front of a Studio Audience	Lionel Jefferson	Episode: "All in the Family and The Jeffersons"	
2019	When They See Us	Adult Antron McCray	Main role	
2019	Watchmen	Will Reeves / Hooded Justice	3 episodes	
2020–2021	The Stand	Larry Underwood	Main role	
2024	3 Body Problem	Saul Durand	Main role	
2025	It: Welcome to Derry	Leroy Hanlon	Main role	

=== Video Games ===
Year	Title	Role	Notes	Ref.
2026	Silent Hill: Townfall	Simon Ordell	Main role	

== Awards and nominations ==
Year	Award	Category	Work	Result	Ref.
2017	Black Reel Award	Outstanding Breakthrough Performance	Fences	Nominated	
2017	Black Reel Award	Outstanding Supporting Actor	Fences	Nominated	
2017	Screen Actors Guild Award	Outstanding Performance by a Cast in a Motion Picture	Fences	Nominated	
2020	Primetime Emmy Award	Outstanding Supporting Actor in a Limited Series or Movie	Watchmen	Nominated	
2023	Screen Actors Guild Award	Outstanding Performance by a Cast in a Motion Picture	Babylon	Nominated	
