= Gerard Monaco =

British actor

Gerard Monaco is a British actor who trained at the Royal Academy of Dramatic Art.

Monaco's first film was Mike Leigh's Vera Drake. He has since had roles in movies including Jane Campion's Bright Star, Jerry Bruckheimer's Pirates of the Caribbean: On Stranger Tides (directed by Rob Marshall), and Starter for Ten.

Monaco's theatre career includes Lindsay Posner's 2009 revival of Arthur Miller's A View From the Bridge, in which Monaco made his West End debut playing Marco, opposite Mary Elizabeth Mastrantonio, Ken Stott and Hayley Atwell.

He has appeared in a number of plays at London's National Theatre, including Steven Pimlott's final production, Tennessee Williams's The Rose Tattoo starring Zoë Wanamaker (Pimlott died in the second week of rehearsals and artistic director Nicholas Hytner took over as director). He has also played opposite Lesley Manville in the premier of Rebecca Lenkiewicz’s play, Her Naked Skin (directed by Howard Davis) and Fiona Shaw in Deborah Warner's production of Mother Courage and Her Children.

Monaco has performed at various other theatres around the country, notable at the Finborough Theatre where he played opposite Victor Spinetti in a two-hander production of Albert's Boy by James Graham. His television work includes roles in As If, EastEnders, The Bill, Holby City, Rome, The Passion, Ashes to Ashes, Any Human Heart and Episodes.

In 2007, Monaco was nominated for the BBC New Talent New Filmmaker Award for his short film The Crusader, which he wrote and directed.

== Filmography ==
=== Film ===
Year	Title	Role	Notes
2002	The Great Dome Robbery	Aido Ciarrocchi	
2004	Vera Drake	Kenny	
2004	Sky Captain and the World of Tomorrow	Technician	
2006	Starter for 10	Waiter	
2009	Bright Star	Charles Dilke	
2010	An Act of Valour	Jeremy	Short film
2011	Pirates of the Caribbean: On Stranger Tides	Spanish Officer	
2011	360	Airport Official (Security Desk)	
2011	National Theatre Live: The Kitchen	Raymondo	
2012	The Grind	Jack (Lad 1 in Bar)	
2013	The Counselor	Hotel Waiter	
2014	National Theatre Live: A Small Family Business	Rivetti brothers	
2014	Exodus: Gods and Kings	Scientist	Uncredited
2015	Point Break	Interpol Agent	
2016	Mother	Cousin Ricky	Short film
2017	Star Wars: The Last Jedi	First Order Commander	
2018	Mamma Mia! Here We Go Again	Alexio	
2018	Holmes & Watson	Titanic Ship Officer	
2024	Lift	A380 Pilot	
2024	Blitz	Air Raid Warden	
2027	Narnia: The Magician's Nephew	TBA	Post-production

=== Television ===
Year	Title	Role	Notes
2001	As If	Gary	3 episodes
2003	The Inspector Lynley Mysteries	Officer	Episode: "In the Presence of the Enemy"
2004	Dive to Bermuda Triangle	Radioman Lewis	TV film
2004, 2010	The Bill	Tony Hill / Kevin Wilkins	2 episodes
2005	Rome	Lyco	Episode: "The Stolen Eagle"
2005, 2007	Holby City	Colin Bradshaw / Roger Abassi	2 episodes
2006	EastEnders	Nico	4 episodes
2007	Hindenburg: The Untold Story	Herbert Morrison	TV film
2008	Little Miss Jocelyn		Episode #2.2
2008	Honest	Dimitri Mavrelos	Episode #1.5
2008	The Passion	Capito	Episode #1.1
2009	Trial & Retribution	Fabio Conte	Episode: "Siren: Part 1"
2009	Ashes to Ashes	Gordon Lanegan	Episode #2.4
2010	Any Human Heart	Photographer	Episode #1.2
2011	Episodes	Paparazzo	Episode: "Episode Four"
2012	Silk	PS Paul Lodder	Episode: "Shooting Blanks: Part 2"
2013–2014	Utopia	Joe	3 episodes
2015	I Live with Models	Edgy Photographer	Episode: "The Handbag"
2015	Supreme Tweeter	Casting Agent	2 episodes
2016	Stan Lee's Lucky Man	Sami	Episode: "The Last Chance"
2017	Prime Suspect 1973	DS Willis	Episode #1.4
2017	The Child in Time	Estate agent	TV film
2017	Britannia	Roman Deserter 2	Episode: "Woe to the Vanquished"
2018	Bliss	Security Guard Tony	Episode #1.4
2017–2019	White Gold	Martin	4 episodes
2017–2019	Harlots	Constable Armitage	10 episodes
2021	Domina	Dacius	Episode: "Fall"
2021	The Box	Joey Cox	2 episodes
2022	The Man Who Fell to Earth	Officer Haugenoe	Episode: "Hallo, Spaceboy"
2022	The Capture	Gerard (Studio Engineer)	Episode: "Made in China"
2023	Casualty	Alex Cross	Episode: "I.O.U."
2024	3 Body Problem	Collins	5 episodes
2024	Eric	Bruno	4 episodes
2026	Dear England	Physio Phil	4 episodes
