= Benedict Wong =

British actor (born 1971)

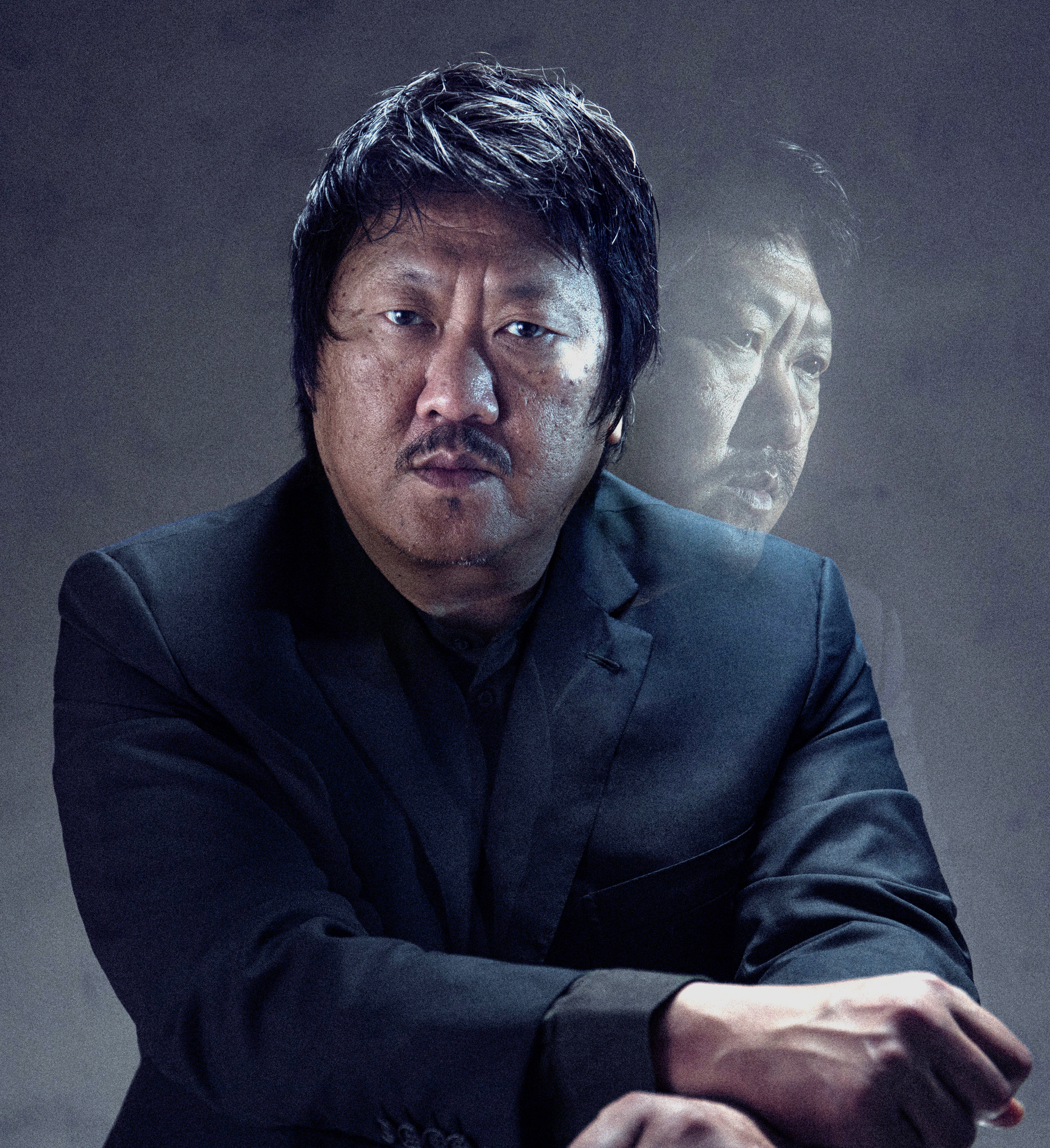
- Wong in 2023 by Peter Guenzel
- Born: 3 July 1971 (age 55); Eccles, Lancashire, England
- Occupation: Actor
- Years active: 1992–present

Chinese name
- Traditional Chinese: 王漢斌
- Simplified Chinese: 王汉斌
Transcriptions
Standard Mandarin
- Hanyu Pinyin: Wáng Hàn Bīn
Yue: Cantonese
- Yale Romanization: Wòhng Hon-bān
- Jyutping: Wong4 Hon3 Ban1

Benedict Wong (born 3 July 1971) is an English actor. He began his career on stage before starring in the film Dirty Pretty Things (2002), which earned him a British Independent Film Award nomination, and the BBC sitcom 15 Storeys High (2002–2004). This was followed by roles in the films On a Clear Day (2005), Sunshine, Grow Your Own (both 2007) and Moon (2009), and the CBBC series Spirit Warriors (2010).

Wong gained further recognition in the 2010s for his roles as Kublai Khan in the Netflix series Marco Polo (2014–2016), Bruce Ng in the film The Martian (2015), and Wong in the Marvel Cinematic Universe since the film Doctor Strange (2016), and the Syfy series Deadly Class (2019). Wong's performance in the film Nine Days (2020) earned him an Independent Spirit Award nomination. As of 2024, he stars in the Netflix series 3 Body Problem. His recent films include Bad Genius (2024) and Weapons (2025).

== Early life and education ==
Wong was born in Eccles, Greater Manchester, (then part of Lancashire),, in 1971, the son of Hong Kong immigrant parents who had travelled through Ireland before settling in England. He grew up in Salford and attended De La Salle Sixth Form College, where he took a two-year performing arts course.

== Career ==
=== Early career ===
Wong's first role was in the 1993 BBC Radio play Kai Mei Sauce, written by his cousin, Kevin Wong. He appeared as Errol Spears alongside Sean Lock in the situation comedy 15 Storeys High, and as Franklin Fu in the second series of Look Around You. In 2003, he was nominated at the British Independent Film Awards for Best Supporting Actor for his role as Guo Yi in Dirty Pretty Things.

In 2007, Wong starred in the feature film Grow Your Own. He appeared in the second episode of Series 4 of the Channel 4 comedy The IT Crowd as Prime, a previous Countdown contestant who had won the sixteenth Countdown teapot when he was known as Harold Tong. He also appeared in the film Shanghai as Juso Kita, and played Li in the BBC series Spirit Warriors.

In 2012, Wong appeared in the Ridley Scott film Prometheus as the ship's pilot, Ravel. In 2013, he played the lead role in #aiww: The Arrest of Ai WeiWei at the Hampstead Theatre. Shortly after, the Almeida Theatre announced that he had joined the cast of the play Chimerica as Zhang Lin. Also in he played gangster Lau in the BBC Two comedy-drama The Wrong Mans. He was nominated for the West End Frame Award for Best Dramatic Performance for his role in Chimerica.

=== International breakthrough ===
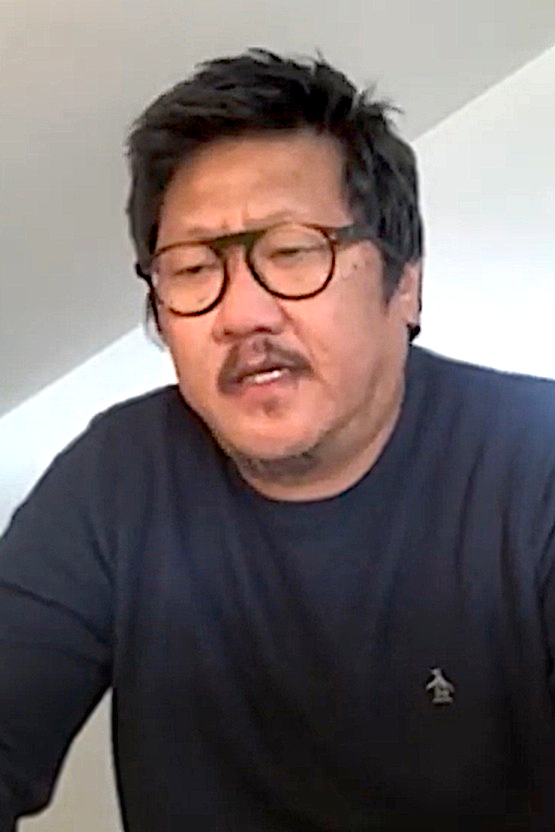
Wong in 2020

In 2014, Wong played Kublai Khan in the Netflix series Marco Polo, which on 7 January 2015 was renewed by Netflix for a 10-episode second series. The next year, he appeared in another Ridley Scott science fiction film, playing Jet Propulsion Lab director Bruce Ng in The Martian. In 2016, he co-starred as Wong in the superhero film Doctor Strange (2016) and later reprised the role in Avengers: Infinity War (2018), Avengers: Endgame (2019), Shang-Chi and the Legend of the Ten Rings (2021), Spider-Man: No Way Home (2021), Doctor Strange in the Multiverse of Madness (2022), and the 2022 Disney+ series She-Hulk: Attorney at Law.

He appeared in Hated in the Nation, an episode of the anthology series Black Mirror, playing Shaun Li, an agent with the National Crime Agency in 2016. In 2017 he voiced Alex Yu in the Arkane Studios game Prey and starred in 2036: Nexus Dawn, a promotional short film prequel to Blade Runner 2049 directed by Luke Scott and co-starring Jared Leto. He appeared as the scientist Lomax in the 2018 science fiction horror film Annihilation.

In 2019, he performed the voice of Skeksis general skekVar in the Netflix series The Dark Crystal: Age of Resistance and the voice of Bull in the film Lady and the Tramp. In 2020, he appeared as a Necromancer in an episode of the FX television series What We Do in the Shadows. Wong's 2013 political play #aiww: The Arrest of Ai Weiwei was streamed through the news network The Guardian again in May 2020.

In 2021, Wong voiced the warrior giant Tong in the Disney animated film Raya and the Last Dragon. In 2021, he was nominated for a Spirit Award for Best Supporting Male for his performance as Kyo in Nine Days. He joined the cast of the Netflix live action adaptation of the Chinese novel The Three Body Problem by Liu Cixin, which began shooting later that year. In 2022, through BBC Radio, he partnered with Ai WeiWei again as the narrator for Ai's memoir 1000 Years of Joys and Sorrows. In 2024, 3 Body Problem was released. The show was well received, with Wong's performance being singled out.

== Personal life ==
Wong is married and has children. He is a fan of Manchester United. In September 2025, Wong signed an open pledge with Film Workers for Palestine pledging not to work with Israeli film institutions "that are implicated in genocide and apartheid against the Palestinian people".

In July 2026, Wong, Benedict Cumberbatch, and Alan Cumming co-authored a statement opposing the proposed Paramount–Warner Bros. merger, and encouraging Lisa Nandy, UK's Secretary of State for Digital, Culture, Media and Sport, to intervene in the takeover.

== Acting credits ==
=== Film ===
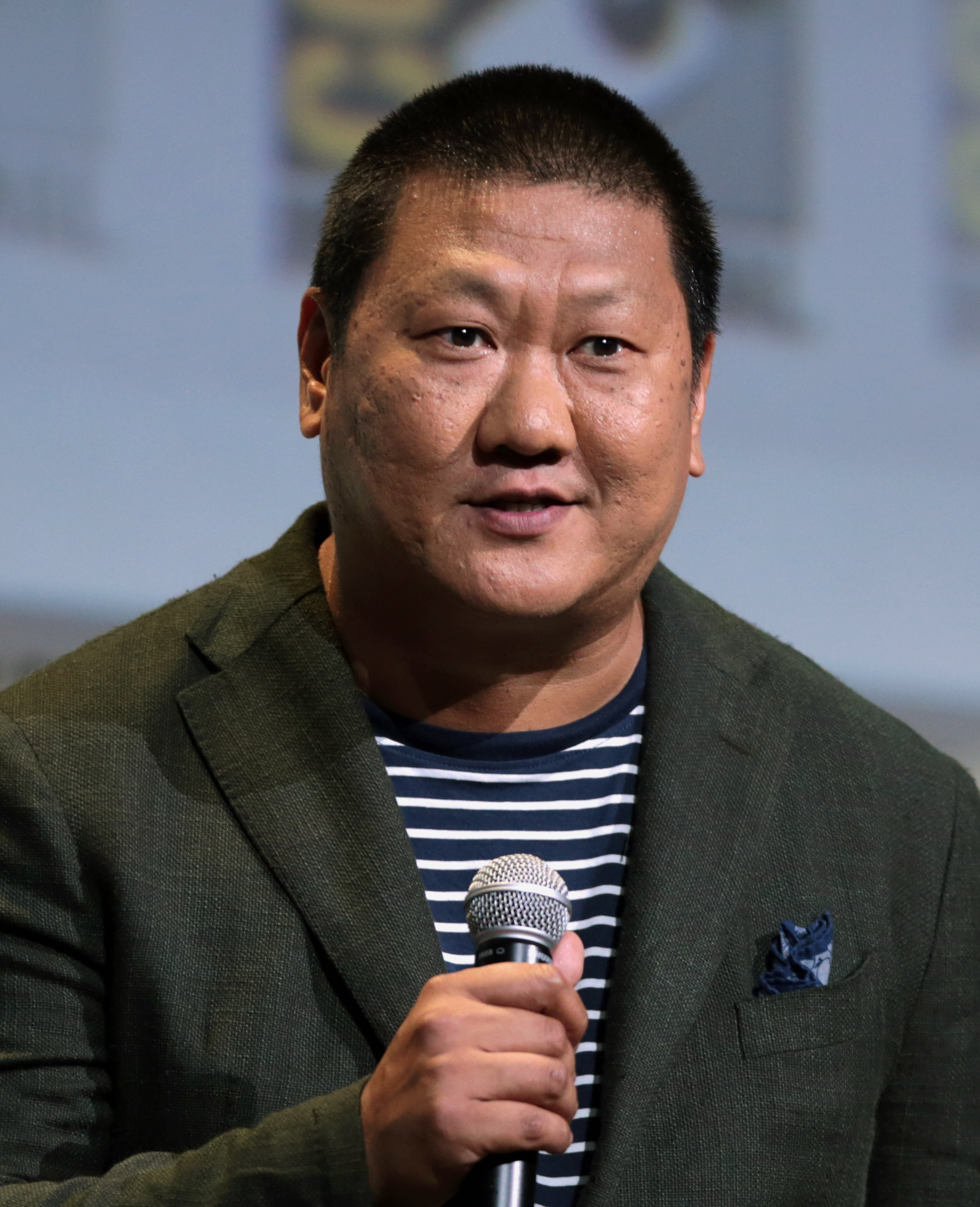
Wong in 2016

Year	Title	Role	Notes
2000	Kiss Kiss (Bang Bang)	Pat Proudence	
2001	Wit	Fellow 2	
2001	Spy Game	Tran	
2002	Dirty Pretty Things	Guo Yi	
2003	Code 46	Medic	
2005	On a Clear Day	Chan	
2005	A Cock and Bull Story	Ed	
2007	Sunshine	Trey	
2007	Grow Your Own	Kung Sang	
2008	Largo Winch	William Kwan	
2009	Moon	Thompson	
2010	Shanghai	Juso Kita	
2011	The Lady	Karma Phuntsho	
2011	Johnny English Reborn	Chi Han Ly	
2011	Painkiller	Jay	Short film
2012	Prometheus	Ravel	
2013	The Counselor	Lee	scenes deleted
2013	Hummingbird	Mr. Choy	
2013	Kick-Ass 2	Mr. Kim	
2015	The Martian	Bruce Ng	
2016	Doctor Strange	Wong	
2018	Annihilation	Lomax	
2018	Avengers: Infinity War	Wong	
2019	Avengers: Endgame	Wong	
2019	The Personal History of David Copperfield	Mr. Wickfield	
2019	Gemini Man	Baron	
2019	Lady and the Tramp	Bull (voice)	
2020	Nine Days	Kyo	
2021	Extinct	Dr. Chung (voice)	
2021	Raya and the Last Dragon	Tong (voice)	
2021	Shang-Chi and the Legend of the Ten Rings	Wong	
2021	Spider-Man: No Way Home	Wong	
2022	Doctor Strange in the Multiverse of Madness	Wong	
2023	The Magician's Elephant	The Magician (voice)	
2024	Bad Genius	Meng	
2025	Weapons	Principal Marcus Miller	
2026	Rock Springs	Ah Tseng	
2026	The Dog Stars	Aaron	
2026	Avengers: Doomsday †	Wong	Post-production
TBA	The Masque of the Red Death †		Filming
TBA	Fonda †		Filming

=== Television ===
Year	Title	Role	Notes
1992	Screenplay	Le Van Dong	1 episode
1993	Last of the Summer Wine	Chinese Man	1 episode
1994	The Chief	Peng	1 episode
1994	Frank Stubbs Promotes	Lee	1 episode
1995	Cardiac Arrest	Radiographer	1 episode
1995	Hearts and Minds	Chinese Interpreter	1 episode
1996	Pie in the Sky	Michael Cheung	1 episode
1996	Cracker	Peter Yang	1 episode
1997	Supply & Demand	Frankie Li	Television film
1997	The Bill	Li Mann	1 episode
1997	Breakout	Jerry	Television film
2000	Arabian Nights	Hassan	Miniseries
2000; 2002	The Bill	Michael Wei / DS David Chiu	8 episodes
2002	TLC	Terry Cheung	Recurring role, 6 episodes
2002	Look Around You	Chess Player	1 episode
2002–2004	15 Storeys High	Errol Spears	Main role, 12 episodes
2003	State of Play	Pete Cheng	Recurring role, 6 episodes
2005	Look Around You	Dr. Franklin Fu	1 episode
2006	Eleventh Hour	Danny	1 episode
2007	Frankenstein	Dr. Ed Gore	Television film
2008	The Peter Serafinowicz Show	Various characters	4 episodes
2010	Spirit Warriors	Li	Main role, 7 episodes
2010	The IT Crowd	Harold "Prime" Tong	1 episode
2010	Spooks	Kai	1 episode
2010–2011	Law & Order: UK	Eli Smart	2 episodes
2011	Covert Affairs	Shen Yue	1 episode
2011–2013	Top Boy	Vincent	Recurring role, 6 episodes
2013	The Wrong Mans	Mr. Lau	4 episodes
2013	Run	Gao	1 episode
2014	Prey	DS Ashley Chan	3 episodes
2014–2016	Marco Polo	Kublai Khan	Main role, 20 episodes
2016	Black Mirror	Shaun Li	Episode: "Hated in the Nation"
2017	Philip K. Dick's Electric Dreams	Ed Andrews	1 episode
2019	Deadly Class	Master Lin	Main role, 10 episodes
2019	The Dark Crystal: Age of Resistance	The General (skekVar) (voice)	Main role, 9 episodes
2020, 2023	What We Do in the Shadows	Wallace the Necromancer	2 episodes
2021	What If...?	Wong (voice)	Episode: "What If... Doctor Strange Lost His Heart Instead of His Hands?"
2021-2022	Marvel Studios: Assembled	Himself	3 episodes
2022	She-Hulk: Attorney at Law	Wong	Special guest star; 3 episodes
2024	3 Body Problem	Da Shi	Main role, 8 episodes

=== Theatre ===
Year	Title	Role	Theatre
1995	The Letter	Ong Chi Seng	Lyric Theatre
1998	The Merchant of Venice	Solanio	Shakespeare's Globe
1998	The Honest Whore	Castruccio	Shakespeare's Globe
1999	Julius Caesar	Gaius Lucilius	Shakespeare's Globe
1999	Antony and Cleopatra	Menas / Scarus	Shakespeare's Globe
2003	In Arabia We'd All Be Kings	Vic / Cop	Hampstead Theatre
2009	The Pillowman	Ariel	Curve
2012	Hamlet	Laertes	Young Vic
2013	Chimerica	Zhang Lin	Almeida Theatre
2013	#aiww: The Arrest of Ai WeiWei	Ai Weiwei	Hampstead Theatre

=== Video games ===
Year	Title	Voice role	Notes
2017	Prey	Alex Yu	

== Awards and nominations ==
Year	Award	Category	Work	Result	Ref.
2003	British Independent Film Awards	Best Supporting Actor	Dirty Pretty Things	Nominated	
2018	Behind the Voice Awards	Best Vocal Ensemble in a Video Game	Prey	Nominated	(Note: Shared with Prey cast.)
2018	BAM Awards	Best Cast	Annihilation	Nominated	(Note: Shared with Annihilation cast.)
2021	Independent Spirit Awards	Best Supporting Male	Nine Days	Nominated	
2022	Gold List	Best Supporting Actor	Nine Days	Mention	
2022	Saturn Awards	Best Supporting Actor	Doctor Strange in the Multiverse of Madness	Nominated	
