= Jess Hong =

New Zealand actress (born 1996 / 1997)

- Hong in 2024
- Born: 4 January 1997 (age 29); Auckland, New Zealand
- Occupation: Actress
- Years active: 2018–present
- Known for: 3 Body Problem

Jess Hong (born 1994 or 1995) is a New Zealand actress. She is known for her role as Jin Cheng in the Netflix series 3 Body Problem (2024).

== Early life and education ==
Jess Hong was born in 1994 or 1995and raised in Palmerston North, New Zealand to Chinese parents. Her mother came from Guangzhou while her father was from Shanghai. She is the youngest of three sisters.

She started taking drama classes at the age of 13, mainly to combat her shyness and social anxiety. Hong initially quit drama classes during her first year of high school but subsequently resumed them at the age of 17 during her final. After completing her secondary education, she moved to Wellington to study for three years at the national drama school, Toi Whakaari, graduating in 2019.

== Career ==
Hong moved to Auckland after graduation, undertaking casual work while auditioning for acting jobs. She has appeared in a variety of stage productions throughout New Zealand, including several Shakespeare performances. On television she has appeared in the New Zealand shows The Brokenwood Mysteries, Inked, Creamerie, and My Life Is Murder.

Hong gained international recognition with a leading role in the Netflix series 3 Body Problem, released in 2024. According to The Hollywood Reporter, Hong's character Jin Cheng, who is originally of Chinese descent, was rewritten to reflect her New Zealand background and accent. To prepare for the role, Hong downloaded Cixin Liu's Remembrance of Earth's Past trilogy on Kindle.

== Filmography ==
=== Television ===
Year	Title	Role	Notes
2021	The Brokenwood Mysteries	Maddy	2 episodes
2021	Inked	Aifei	Main cast
2021	Creamerie	Wellness Worker	3 episodes
2024	3 Body Problem	Jin Cheng	Main cast
2024	My Life Is Murder	Sage	Episode: "Location, Location, Location"

=== Film ===
Year	Title	Role	Notes
2023	Grafted	Angela	

=== Theatre ===
Year	Title	Role	Venue
2018	Rushes	Dancer	Circa Theatre, Wellington
2018	Grand Opening	Party Girl	Civic Theatre, Auckland
2019	Romeo and Juliet	Juliet	Pop Up Globe
2019	Much Ado About Nothing	Hero/Ensemble	Pop Up Globe
2019	An Organ of Soft Tissue	Prefrontal Cortex	The Basement Theatre, Auckland
2020	Front Yard Festivals	Wahine	Te Pou Theater
2020	48 Nights on Hope Street	Nathan/Narrator	ASB Waterfront Theatre, Auckland
2021	Duffy in Bubble Trouble	Scruffy	National tour
2022	The First Prime-Time Asian Sitcom	Angela Xu	Q Theatre - Loft, Auckland
