= Marlo Kelly =

Australian actress (born 1997)

- Born: 1996 or 1997 (age 29–30)
- Occupation: Actress
- Years active: 2015–present
- Known for: 3 Body Problem (2024); Joe vs. Carole (2022); Dare Me (2019–2020); Home and Away (2015–2016)

Marlo Kelly (born 1996/1997) is an Australian actress best known for her role in the Netflix series 3 Body Problem.

== Biography ==
Kelly was born in 1996 or 1997 in Australia.

She made her acting debut in the Australian television soap opera Home and Away (2015–2016). Kelly went on to appear in 2018 Australian/French horror series Patricia Moore (2018); the American television series Dare Me (2019–2020); and the American television drama Joe vs. Carole (2022).
