= Three-body problem (disambiguation) =

The three-body problem is a trajectory problem in physics.

It may also refer to:

== Science ==
- Euler's three-body problem, a variant of the three-body problem discussed by Leonhard Euler

== Literature ==
- Remembrance of Earth's Past, also known as The Three-Body Problem, a trilogy of science fiction novels by Liu Cixin
  - The Three-Body Problem (novel), 2008, by Liu Cixin and the first book in the trilogy

== Film and television ==
- The Three-Body Problem (film), an unreleased Chinese science fiction 3D film adaptation of the novel The Three-Body Problem
- The Three-Body Problem in Minecraft, a 2014 Chinese animated series adaptation of Remembrance of Earth's Past
- The Three-Body Problem (animated TV series), a 2022 Chinese animated series adaptation of the novel The Dark Forest, the second book in the Remembrance of Earth's Past trilogy
- Three-Body, a 2023 Chinese live-action series adaptation of the novel The Three-Body Problem, produced by Tencent Video
- 3 Body Problem (TV series), a 2024 Netflix American science fiction series adaptation of Remembrance of Earth's Past

== See also ==
- Three body (disambiguation)
- Poincaré and the Three-Body Problem, a monograph in the history of mathematics on the work of Henri Poincaré on the three-body problem in celestial mechanics
- Two-body problem, in physics
