= Remembrance of Earth's Past =

Science fiction book trilogy by Liu Cixin

- United States edition book covers by Tor Books. United Kingdom book covers have slightly different designs.
- The Three-Body Problem (2006); The Dark Forest (2008); Death's End (2010)
- Author: Liu Cixin (Note: Credited as Cixin Liu in the English editions)
- Original title: 地球往事; Dìqiú Wǎngshì
- Translator: Ken Liu (books 1 and 3); Joel Martinsen (book 2)
- Country: China
- Language: Mandarin Chinese
- Genre: Hard science fiction, alien invasion
- Publisher: Chongqing Publishing Group (Chinese edition): JP: Hayakawa Books; UK: Head of Zeus Ltd; US: Tor Books
- Published: May 2008 – November 2010 (original trilogy); 2011 (fanfiction spin-off)
- Published in English: November 11, 2014 – September 19, 2016 (original trilogy); July 16, 2019 (spin-off)
- Media type: Print (hardcover & paperback); Audiobook; e-Book
- No. of books: 3

Remembrance of Earth's Past
- Simplified Chinese: 地球往事
- Traditional Chinese: 地球往事
- Literal meaning: Earth's Past
Transcriptions
Standard Mandarin
- Hanyu Pinyin: Dìqiú wǎngshì

Alternative Chinese name
- Simplified Chinese: 三体
- Traditional Chinese: 三體
- Literal meaning: Three-Bodies
Transcriptions
Standard Mandarin
- Hanyu Pinyin: Sān Tǐ

Remembrance of Earth's Past (Chinese: 地球往事; pinyin: Dìqiú Wǎngshì; lit. 'Earth's Past') is a science fiction novel series by Chinese writer Liu Cixin. The series is also popularly referred to as Three-Body from part of the title of its first novel, The Three-Body Problem (Chinese: 三体; pinyin: Sān Tǐ; lit. 'Three-Body'). The series details humanity's discovery of and preparation for an alien invasion force from the planet Trisolaris.

== Books ==
=== Original trilogy ===
The books in the Remembrance of Earth's Past trilogy are:

Title (English)	Title (Chinese)	Date	Notes
The Three-Body Problem	三体	2008	English translation by Ken Liu published by Tor Books on November 11, 2014.
The Dark Forest	黑暗森林	2008	English translation by Joel Martinsen published by Tor Books on August 11, 2015.
Death's End	死神永生	2010	English translation by Ken Liu published by Tor Books on September 20, 2016

=== Extended series ===
- Ball Lightning, a 2004 novel by Liu Cixin, set earlier in the same universe.
- The Redemption of Time, originally posted to an internet forum as fan fiction by Baoshu, later published by the original trilogy publisher with the permission of Liu Cixin in 2011.

== Synopsis ==
=== The Three-Body Problem ===
Astronomer Ye Wenjie is brought to the military's top-secret Red Coast Project after suffering an attack during the Cultural Revolution. She achieves a significant advancement in the search for extraterrestrial civilization when she uses the Sun as an amplifier to send the first sounds of Earth's civilization into space. Meanwhile, the planet Trisolaris, located four light years distant and dominated by the chaotic orbits of its three suns, experiences ever-recurring destruction and rebirth, thus forcing the planet's inhabitants to flee their home planet. As they prepare their exodus, Ye Wenjie, despairing of humanity's ability to save itself from itself, exposes the coordinates of the Earth to the Trisolarans, completely changing the fates of both worlds.

When anomalies begin to disrupt the ability of Earth's scientists to conduct fundamental research, nanomaterials researcher Wang Miao plays the mysterious online game "Three-Body Problem" and starts to explore the nature of the game's world. Wang Miao meets the secretive Earth-Trisolaris Organization (ETO), created to support the impending arrival of Trisolarans, while attending a player meeting. "Operations Guzheng" allows the Operations Centre to partially defeat the Adventists (who want the Trisolarans to wipe out humanity) and the Redemptionists (who seek to help the Trisolarans find a computational solution to the three-body problem plaguing Trisolaris). It also reveals that the Trisolarans have launched their invasion of Earth in search of a stable place to live. The end of humanity draws near as the huge Trisolaran fleet approaches Earth after using their superior technology to shut down Earth's advances in fundamental science.

=== The Dark Forest ===
Following the Trisolarans' use of technology to lock down Earth science and launch a huge space fleet straight into the Solar System, human beings also create a huge space fleet to react to the unprecedented Earth civilization crisis, while the Planetary Defence Council (PDC) uses the fatal flaw in the Trisolarans' logic to create the "Wallfacer Plan". Astronomer Luo Ji is unexpectedly selected as one of the four "wallfacers" to launch a secret counteroffensive against the Trisolarans. The Trisolarians respond by deploying "wallbreakers" chosen by Earth's betrayers to make up for the Trisolarians' inability to see through human tactics.

In the fight for survival, Luo eventually recognises his responsibilities from escaping and hedonism at first and devises a strategy to fight the invasion of Trisolaris civilization. Luo Ji also confirms the Dark Forest Rule, which states that any civilization that reveals its location will be wiped out. With this discovery, he threatens to reveal the Trisolaris' position coordinates to the whole universe, temporarily delaying the Trisolaran's invasion of the Solar System and establishing a precarious strategic balance between Earth and Trisolaris.

=== Death's End ===
Using the life of human Cheng Xin on Earth as its main line, this book continues human history after the establishment of deterrence in the second work, Dark Forest, and further reveals the truth of the Dark Forest predicament in the cosmos. Humanity's first glimpse of the truth of the dark universe came from the fight with the Trisolaran civilization, which made Earth's civilization shiver in the dark night like a scared child. They believe they have discovered the key to survival, but in fact, they are far from qualified for an interstellar fight.

On the cosmic battlefield, the attack in the Dark Forest that has threatened the survival of two civilizations is simply a minor episode. As the techniques and weapons of war have far outpaced human imagination and the day of witnessing the battlefield is the day of extermination, no one has ever seen a real interstellar war, and it is impossible to see one. Although the solar system does not survive in the book, Cheng Xin and Guan Yifan from the Starship civilization manage to keep the flame of human civilization in the Solar System.

A Past Outside of Time, which is excerpted throughout the book, is revealed to be a record written by Cheng Xin.

== Science fiction concepts ==
=== Sophons ===
Sophons are created from eleven-dimensional protons dimensionally unfolded down to two-dimensional protons with Trisolaran particle accelerators. While in the two-dimensional form, they are embedded with circuitry to create a supercomputer. Once online, the embedded supercomputer could control the proton's dimensional level and could fold itself back into an eleven-dimensional proton. To be seen with the naked eye, the protons could unfold themselves down to a fourth-, fifth-, or sixth-dimensional form, becoming larger with each subsequent lower dimension without changing mass. They can visually record anything and thus their secondary purpose is to act as surveillance devices, beaming the information they gather back to another sophon instantaneously via quantum entanglement. Their primary purpose for their Trisolaran manufacturers is to disrupt Earth's particle accelerators, capable of straying into the paths of fired particles and scrambling the results of experiments before re-assembling, effectively blocking advancement of the science. Since they can move through three-dimensional space at the speed of light, a single sophon is capable of disrupting all of Earth's particle accelerators.

=== Droplets ===
Trisolaran space probes are covered in a strong interaction force material. Due to this material, they are stronger than any material in the Solar System and thus are impervious to any physical attack. Their propulsion system is capable of moving in any direction in 3D space. Seemingly unaffected by inertia, they can make sudden impossible turns, and their primary method of attack is to simply smash through objects.

=== Curvature propulsion ===
Simplified in a demonstration as a piece of soap attached to a paper boat on water, with the soap reducing the water tension at its end, and the water tension disparity propelling the boat. Traveling through previous paths slows the boat down due to decreased surface tension. Curvature Propulsion is a method of acceleration to lightspeed that utilizes the same concept, via reducing the speed of light it is possible to drag a ship through space at light speed, while its wake is a reduced light-speed region of space.

=== Hibernation ===
Humanity by the time of Dark Forest has developed cryogenic technology, capable of preserving a human life, unaging, for hundreds of years barring certain genetic disorders. Initially, it is viewed as a sign of inequality before it is fully developed, viewed as a way for the rich to simply skip through the centuries to eras of more advanced technology, peace, and human development. With the advent of the Trisolaran invasion, however, it becomes a near-priceless technology in terms of demand, as people prefer to die naturally in a world still free from Trisolaris rather than skip ahead to doomsday. Because of this, only researchers and certain high-value staff make use of cryogenics to skip through time.

=== Cosmic sociology ===
The study of theoretical interactions between cosmic civilizations. This area of study is first proposed by the character Ye Wenjie in conversation with future Wallfacer Luo Ji. Ye Wenjie proposes two axioms of cosmic sociology: "First: Survival is the primary need of civilization. Second: Civilization continuously grows and expands, but the total matter in the universe remains constant." After becoming a Wallfacer, Luo Ji uses the axioms provided by Ye Wenjie to invent the dark-forest theory of the universe and the idea of dark-forest deterrence to stop the Trisolaran invasion.

=== Dimensional Strike ===
A dimensional strike is the dimensionality reduction of space. This will cause all objects within the collapsing area to lose a dimension. In Death's End, a dimensional strike is used to destroy the Solar System. It is also explained that there is no way to survive a dimensional strike except by altering life so that it can survive in one less dimension and that the collapse won't stop until the entire universe has its number of dimensions lowered. That is why the universe started out with ten dimensions but now has patches of lower dimensions, including three.

== Analysis ==
Scholars and critics have identified a range of political and philosophical themes in the trilogy.

The series' depiction of the universe as a hostile "dark forest" has been interpreted as an allegory for China's place in the global order and as an expression of neorealist ideas in international relations. According to international relations scholar Chenchen Zhang, the dark forest theory mirrors the security dilemma central to neorealism, portraying mutual suspicion, deterrence, and pre-emptive hostility as inevitable between great powers.

The series is said to be popular among those with nationalist sentiment. Particularly among "techno-nationalists", The Three-Body Problem is often read as an allegory for China-United States relations, with Earth representing China and Trisolaris the United States. Some have drawn parallels between Luo Ji's deterrence theory and Mao Zedong's nuclear strategy, using the story to argue that China must remain vigilant, strengthen its military, and resist the cultural and technological dominance of rival powers.

Polish science fiction critic Wojciech Orliński, while noting that the novels are well-written, argued that the trilogy represents Liu Cixin's endorsement of concepts of world government, consequentialism as well as tacit approval of "China's surveillance and control society". Orliński concluded that "sometimes the greater horror will be here not what aliens do, but what people do (with the author's approval)".

Some commentators have highlighted the series' treatment of gender and morality. Zhang notes that compassion, democracy, and empathy—often associated with femininity—are depicted in the series as weaknesses leading to decline, while masculine-coded traits such as rationality, aggression, and autocracy are valorized as necessary for survival. Zhang suggests this framework echoes techno-nationalist and social-Darwinist discourses that delegitimize progressive or feminist values.

Similarly, critics have described Liu's female characters as underdeveloped and reflective of sexist assumptions, while adaptations have been praised for reimagining them in more complex ways. By contrast, University of Liverpool senior lecturer Aiqing Wang contends that Liu's work does not endorse sexism, citing its inclusion of capable female scientists and exploration of "feminised masculinity" in the third novel, though she acknowledges the persistence of traditional gender stereotypes.

== Adaptations ==
The Three-Body Problem is an indefinitely postponed Chinese science fiction 3D film, adapted from The Three-Body Problem, directed by Fanfan Zhang, and starring Feng Shaofeng and Zhang Jingchu.

A Chinese Minecraft machinima animated series based on the trilogy began releasing on February 27, 2014.

Waterdrop, a 2015 Chinese short film based on The Dark Forest.

A Chinese animated series based on The Dark Forest aired from December 10, 2022, to March 25, 2023.

A Chinese live-action series based on The Three-Body Problem aired from January 15 to February 3, 2023.

A live-action, English-language series based on the trilogy premiered on Netflix on March 21, 2024, with David Benioff, D. B. Weiss, and Alexander Woo as showrunners.

A 3-part documentary series entitled Rendezvous with the Future which explores the science behind Liu Cixin's science fiction was produced by BBC Studios and released by Bilibili in China in November 2022. The series includes an extensive interview with Liu Cixin and covers many ideas featured in the Remembrance of Earth's Past such as: messaging extraterrestrial civilisations; gravitational wave transmitter; dark forest hypothesis; space elevator; artificial hibernation; fusion drive; and circumsolar particle accelerator.

== See also ==
- Andromeda: A Space-Age Tale
- Hobbesian trap
- Hegemonic stability theory
