= Three body =

Three body may refer to:

== Religion ==
- Three bodies doctrine, doctrine in Vedanta: the gross body, the subtle body, and the causal body
- Trikaya, the Buddhist Nirmāṇakāya or "created body", Sambhogakāya or "body of bliss", and the Dharmakāya or "Truth body"

== Science ==
- Three-body problem, a problem in physics and classical mechanics
- Euler's three-body problem, a problem in physics and astronomy
- Three-body force, a force appearing in a three-body system
- Molecularity#Termolecular reaction, a three-body chemical reaction

== Science fiction ==
- The Three-Body Problem (novel), a 2008 science fiction novel by Chinese author Liu Cixin
  - Three-Body, a 2023 Chinese TV series adaptation of the novel
  - The Three-Body Problem (film), an unreleased film based on the novel
  - The Three-Body Problem (animated TV series), a 2022 Chinese animated series
  - 3 Body Problem (TV series), a 2024 American adaptation of the novel

== See also ==
- Three-body problem (disambiguation)
- Trinity, the Christian doctrine of one God existing in three coequal, coeternal, consubstantial divine persons
