= Rendezvous with the Future =

- Also known as: 未来漫游指南
- Genre: Science, technology
- Directed by: David Briggs
- Starring: Liu Cixin
- Composers: Jim Cornick; Matt Loveridge
- Original languages: English, Chinese
- No. of seasons: 1
- No. of episodes: 3

Production
- Executive producer: Steve Crabtree
- Running time: 50 minutes
- Production companies: Bilibili, BBC Studios

Original release
- Network: Bilibili
- Release: 16 November – 30 November 2022

Rendezvous with the Future is a documentary series commissioned by Bilibili and produced by BBC Studios which explores the science behind the science fiction of author Liu Cixin. The series premiered in China on 16 November 2022 and was watched by a combined audience of more than 92 million.

== Reception ==
The series won 'China Story: Best Documentary Series' Award at the 2023 Guangzhou International Documentary Film Festival. The jury panel commented: "This dazzling series impressed the jury with its extraordinary visual creativity. A wonderful master interview brought mankind's biggest issues to life in a thought provoking and imaginative way, opening our minds to the universe and its infinite scientific possibilities." In addition, the series won 'Best SVOD popular series', 'Top 10 Best Series' and 'Most innovative work' at the 2023 China Documentary Festival Awards; 'Best Composer' at the 2023 Royal Television Society West of England Awards; and the Grand Jury Prize at the 2024 CICSEP China Dragon Awards.

== Episodes ==
The series comprises three 50-minute episodes, each focusing on a particular theme from Mr Liu's science fiction.

=== 1. First Contact ===
"Contact with an alien civilisation has many possibilities. It might have a good outcome. Equally it might have terrible consequences. Any child knows not to open the door to strangers. They know not to greet strangers casually. This is a matter of common sense." — Liu Cixin

In this episode, Liu Cixin explores the different possibilities for how first contact with an alien civilisation might happen.

The programme begins with the dilemma posed in Liu Cixin's novel The Three-Body Problem: if humanity receives a message from aliens, should we reply? For the fictional character Ye Wenjie, the answer is 'yes' and Douglas Vakoch who is President of METI International shares the same view. His organisation creates and transmits interstellar messages in an attempt to communicate with extraterrestrial civilisations. At the EISCAT facility in Norway, Vakoch explains how a radar transmitter could be used to broadcast a reply. He proposes that the message could be similar in design to previous attempts to communicate with other civilisations across the galaxy, such as the Arecibo Message.

Astronomer Frank Drake describes the historic Project Ozma in which he used the 85-foot Howard E. Tatel telescope at the National Radio Astronomy Observatory in Green Bank to search for possible radio transmissions from two star systems Epsilon Eridani and Tau Ceti. Referenced in The Three-Body Problem, it is generally recognised as humanity's first attempt to detect interstellar radio transmissions.

Astronomer Li Di describes the background to the construction of the Five-hundred-meter Aperture Spherical Telescope which is the largest filled-aperture radio telescope in the world. Li explains the different approaches they are taking in SETI. He is Principal Investigator of the Commensal Radio Astronomy FasT Survey - a multipurpose 'drift-scan' survey of the sky which will use 500 hours of telescope time per year and will take approximately 10 years to complete. FAST is also being used to conduct bespoke searches of nearby star systems with exoplanets identified by the Transiting Exoplanet Survey Satellite.

The search for extraterrestrial intelligence has so far focused primarily on electromagnetic signals in radio or microwave frequencies since this is the form of interstellar communication that human civilisation first became capable of. In 2017, astronomers began searching for optical transmissions in the form of laser pulses. But Liu Cixin's novel The Dark Forest explores the possibility of communication based on more exotic physics such as gravitational waves or neutrinos.

Scientists at the Advanced Propulsion Laboratory at Applied Physics have argued that LIGO is already capable of detecting artificially generated gravitational wave signals. Caltech experimental physicist Rana Adhikari outlines the design of a terrestrial gravitational wave transmitter that could give human civilisation the capability of transmitting a gravitational wave message to nearby stars.

Another possibility is that first contact takes place through the detection of alien technology. The theoretical physicist Freeman Dyson advocated expanding SETI to detect hypothesised alien megastructures such as Dyson Spheres. Closer to home, a number of scientists have argued that the Solar System should be searched for evidence of alien artifacts.

Astrobiologist Jacob Haqq Misra describes the discovery of the interstellar object, 'Oumuamua. Its intriguing characteristics prompted speculation that it might be an alien space probe. But no radio transmissions were detected emanating from the object and further study determined it to be of entirely natural origin.

Astronomer Jill Tarter describes her involvement in drafting one of the first post-detection protocols, establishing principles for what should be done in the event of the detection of extraterrestrial intelligence. The discovery of an apparent signal or alien technology is likely to have a high degree of uncertainty and many factors will impact its potential significance.

=== 2. Voyage to the Stars ===
"I think if humans want to survive, our only choice is to expand our living space in the universe. Like H.G. Wells once said: Human beings will either fill the universe or perish completely. There is no other choice." — Liu Cixin

In this second episode, Liu Cixin explores the possibility of interstellar travel and how humankind could settle other star systems.

Scientists such as Stephen Hawking argued that the colonisation of space is necessary to mitigate the risks of human extinction from natural or human-made disasters. The Dark Forest Hypothesis, outlined in Liu Cixin's novel The Dark Forest, provides another reason to settle other star systems to ensure the long-term survival of human civilisation.

The programme begins with an interview with Dr Dario Izzo of the European Space Agency's Advanced Concepts Team. He describes the 10th edition of the Global Trajectory Optimisation Competition in which 73 teams from around the world competed to find the most efficient approach for galactic settlement using future hypothetical technology such as Generation Ships. The winning solution achieved the settlement of approximately 3,100 stars across the galaxy in 90 million years.

The programme then explores some of the key 'breakthrough' technologies referenced in Liu Cixin's novel The Dark Forest.

Physicist Bradley Edwards describes the concept of the space elevator - a system that could transport material from the surface of Earth into geostationary orbit. Edwards argues that a key reason that humankind has not yet built vast structures in Earth orbit is economic. For example, the construction of the International Space Station relied on conventional chemical rockets and cost $150 billion (in 2010 dollars) making it one of the most expensive objects ever built. In contrast, Edwards argues, a space elevator would be able transport materials into space at lower cost - potentially playing a crucial role in the construction of large spaceships assembled in Earth Orbit.

A second significant challenge for interstellar travel is the design of the spaceship's Life-Support System. Unlike the International Space Station which receives regular supplies from Earth, an interstellar spaceship travelling through deep space will need to be an entirely closed system independent of Earth. Jane Poynter describes how Biosphere 2 attempted to create a partially closed system, by duplicating many of Earth's natural processes.

Mr Liu proposes that a third major 'breakthrough' technology is nuclear fusion. There are many different approaches being tested to achieve controlled nuclear fusion. The ITER experiment currently being assembled in southern France is based on the tokamak design. But at Princeton Plasma Physics Laboratory, engineer Stephanie Thomas and plasma physicist Samuel Cohen are testing an early prototype of the Direct Fusion Drive experiment. In this design, nuclear fusion is used to directly generate thrust. A 'Fusion Drive' is described in Liu Cixin's novel Death's End.

Finally, the programme explores the challenge of how a human crew might survive a voyage that would likely last well beyond the human lifespan. One solution is that it is not the original crew that reaches the destination, but their descendants. This is the concept of the Generation Ship - a ship that carries generations upon generations that live and die onboard the vessel. Liu Cixin references this in his celebrated fictional 'Letter to My Daughter'.

Another proposed solution, widely explored in science fiction, is to extend the human lifespan through artificial hibernation or suspended animation. Professor Jon Rittenberger describes experimental studies he carried out at the Applied Physiology Laboratory at the University of Pittsburgh in which the core body temperature of nine healthy volunteers was lowered by around 3 °C for 3 hours with medication used to suppress shivering. The results achieved were consistent with an estimated reduction in metabolic rate of between 20% and 25%. In comparison, hibernating mammals reduce their metabolic rate by 80% to 98%. Rittenberger advocates that 'shallow' reductions in the metabolic rate could find an application in interplanetary spaceflight.

=== 3. Becoming a Supercivilisation ===
"The characteristics of a supercivilisation are that it uses technology to enhance its evolution to become a more powerful species. Second, the energy that a supercivilisation can use must be really huge. Third, it must have gone a long way on this path of understanding the laws of the universe. But a technologically advanced supercivilisation cannot be a civilisation with only ideas. It must have left its own mark on the universe. It must have spread to places of considerable distance." - Liu Cixin

In the final episode, Liu Cixin explores what the far future has in store and how humanity could become a technologically advanced supercivilisation.

In 1964, the Soviet astronomer Nikolai Kardashev proposed a means of ranking the advancement of a civilisation according to the amount of energy it can access. Kardashev categorised a Type I civilisation as one that utilises the energy of all the starlight falling on its planet; a Type II civilisation utilises the entire energy of its star; and a Type III civilisation utilises the energy of its entire galaxy.

Mathematician and philosopher Stuart Armstrong discusses how humanity could become a Type II supercivilisation through the construction of a Dyson Sphere around the Sun. Armstrong suggests that sufficient material could be obtained by disassembling the Planet Mercury. By using AI-assisted technology and a 'recursive manufacturing loop', he estimates that construction of the Dyson Sphere could be completed within approximately 30 years. Liu Cixin is sceptical of the Dyson Sphere concept and believes broader criteria for a supercivilisation are required.

Liu Cixin suggests that a second attribute of a supercivilisation is that it must use technology to enhance its evolution to become a more powerful species. AI researcher Xu Li discusses the path towards the development of artificial superintelligence and argues that AI will play an increasingly important role in scientific discovery.

A third criteria Liu Cixin proposes is that a supercivilisation should have made great progress in its scientific understanding of the universe. Today, one of the greatest mysteries in cosmology concerns the existence of dark matter. Physicist Laura Manenti introduces the XENON dark matter experiment at the Laboratori Nazionali del Gran Sasso which she hopes will allow scientists to better understand the properties of dark matter. At CERN, particle physicist James Beacham discusses the far future of experiments in high energy physics and the idea of building a particle accelerator spanning the entire 10,900 km circumference of the Moon. Liu Cixin's science fiction novel Death's End describes the possibility of an even larger 'circumsolar' particle accelerator constructed in orbit around the Sun. Beacham speculates about how such an experiment might be realised in practice and whether it could ultimately reach the Holy Grail of particle physics - the Planck Energy.

Liu Cixin's final criteria of a supercivilisation is that it must have spread to places of considerable distance across the universe. His science fiction novel Death's End features the idea of 'curvature propulsion' which may have been inspired by the Alcubierre drive proposed in 1994 by theoretical physicist Miguel Alcubierre. Physicist and historian James Woodward describes another speculative idea: using the principle of inertia to generate thrust through the hypothesied 'Mach Effect'. Woodward suggests that the same physics could allow the artificial creation of wormholes and potentially realise the possibility of space travel across galaxies.
