= Ball Lightning (disambiguation) =

Ball lightning is a rare and unexplained phenomenon described as floating luminescent spheres.

Ball lightning or Ball Lightning may also refer to:

- Ball Lightning (film), a 1979 Czech film
- Ball Lightning (novel), a 2004 novel by Liu Cixin
- "Ball Lightning," a song by Rocket from the Crypt from their 1995 album Scream, Dracula, Scream!
