= Death's End =

2010 science fiction novel by Liu Cixin

- United States edition cover
- Author: Liu Cixin
- Original title: 死神永生
- Translator: Ken Liu
- Language: Chinese
- Series: Remembrance of Earth's Past
- Genre: Science fiction, Hard science fiction
- Publication date: 2010
- Publication place: China
- Pages: 592
- ISBN: 978-0765377104
- Preceded by: The Dark Forest

Death's End
- Chinese: 死神永生
- Literal meaning: God of Death Lives Forever
Transcriptions
Standard Mandarin
- Hanyu Pinyin: sǐshén yǒngshēng
- IPA: [sì.ʂə̌n jʊ̀ŋ.ʂə́ŋ]
Yue: Cantonese
- Jyutping: sei^{2} san^{4} wing^{5} sang^{1}
Southern Min
- Hokkien POJ: sí-sîn éng-seng

Death's End (Chinese: 死神永生) is a science fiction novel by the Chinese writer Liu Cixin. It is the third novel in the trilogy titled Remembrance of Earth's Past, following the Hugo Award-winning novel The Three-Body Problem and its sequel, The Dark Forest. The original Chinese version was published in 2010. Ken Liu translated the English edition in 2016. It was a finalist for the 2017 Hugo Award for Best Novel and winner of the 2017 Locus Award for Best Science Fiction Novel.

== Plot ==
In the 2010s, the early years of the Trisolar Crisis, young aerospace engineer Cheng Xin is recruited by the Planetary Intelligence Agency (PIA) under its coldly rational chief Thomas Wade. They initiate the "Staircase Project", which attempts to send a human spy at relativistic speed to the approaching Trisolaran invasion fleet. Technological limitations for achieving such speed restricts the payload to a human brain, which the PIA hopes the Trisolarans can revive upon its reception.

Cheng requests an old university classmate afflicted by terminal cancer, Yun Tianming, to donate his brain. Unbeknownst to Cheng, Yun harbors romantic feelings for her, and he has previously purchased for Cheng the rights to distant star DX3906 in a United Nations-organized fundraiser. After Yun's brain is launched, Cheng enters hibernation to await the Staircase Project's outcome.

Some 200 years later, Cheng wakes from hibernation and becomes immensely wealthy by selling her rights to DX3906. By this time, Earth and Trisolaris have entered a truce due to the dark forest deterrence. The deterrence is enforced by the "Swordholder": an individual who, should Trisolaris violate the truce, is authorized to send a cosmic broadcast containing Trisolaris' location, which would invite the mutual destruction of both Trisolaris and Earth by third parties. Cheng's newfound fame results in her election to succeed the aging Luo Ji, the inaugural Swordholder who established the dark forest deterrence. However, immediately after the Swordholder succession, Trisolaris launches an attack on Earth's cosmic broadcast abilities, gambling correctly that Cheng will refuse to activate the deterrence.

With Earth-based deterrence systems neutralized, Trisolaris announces a renewed invasion effort, promising humanity Australia as a reservation in an attempt to prevent resistance. However, one remaining functional broadcast system remains onboard the starship Gravity, which was initially sent to deep space to capture the fugitive ship Blue Space. Trisolaris' attempt to attack Gravity is thwarted by Blue Space's crew, who exploit the fourth dimension to do so. Believing Earth to be lost, the two ships' combined crew activate Gravity's broadcast system as revenge against Trisolaris' treachery, resulting in Trisolaris' destruction by a third party. Understanding that Earth is also at risk of imminent destruction due to its relative proximity to Trisolaris, the surviving Trisolaran fleets abandon their invasion attempt.

Having intercepted Yun's brain and revived him, the Trisolarans permit Cheng to converse with him. Under the guise of narrating fairy tales, he sends a coded message containing survival advice for humanity. Three survival strategies are created with this information:

- the "Bunker Project": building space cities in the gas giants' shadows to survive a possible destruction of the Sun in a dark-forest attack
- development of lightspeed travel, which is later banned because of the taboo against escapism
- development of a "black domain", an envelope of space with decreased lightspeed that simultaneously shields from attacks and prevents anything from leaving. This is a sign of harmlessness, as the civilization inside a black domain cannot affect anything outside.

During the next few decades, as Cheng hibernates, humanity builds several space cities according to the Bunker Project, but progress on the Black Domain Plan is stalled. Cheng is awoken as Wade has successfully but illegally developed basic lightspeed travel, and requests Cheng's permission to proceed, which she denies. Wade is executed for his transgressions as Cheng re-enters hibernation.

Several decades later, hostile aliens launch the anticipated dark-forest attack. To humanity's surprise, however, the means of attack did not involve destruction of the Sun but rather collapse of the entire three-dimensional Solar System into two dimensions. As the escape velocity from the dimensional attack is lightspeed, the vast majority of humanity is killed due to the lack of lightspeed travel technology. Cheng and her aide AA are awoken amidst the attack. They visit Luo Ji on Pluto, who informs them their spaceship contains the only surviving lightspeed engine from Wade's experiments. Cheng and AA escape the attack, becoming the only humans remaining in the universe alongside Yun and the crews of Gravity and Blue Space.

286 years later, Cheng and AA arrive at her star DX3906's "Planet Blue", though the voyage passes quickly for them due to time dilation from lightspeed travel. There they encounter Guan Yifan, a civilian cosmologist on Gravity, who explains that the two ships' crews have founded several interstellar societies. Leaving AA on Planet Blue, Cheng and Guan fly to the nearby "Planet Gray", where they discover several unstable seed elements of a black domain that grows to encompass the entire DX3906 system. The significantly decreased lightspeed within the black domain cause Cheng and Guan to experience severe time dilation; almost 19 million years have passed in Planet Blue's reference frame by the time they return to Planet Blue.

In their absence, Yun had visited Planet Blue to deliver "Universe 647": a Trisolaran-constructed self-contained micro-universe that exists outside of the conventional timeline. Cheng and Guan live in Universe 647's pastorally decorated interior, hoping to outlast the main universe and observe its rebirth in a Big Bounce. After a period of idyllic living, they receive a message from the main universe, stating that the presence of micro-universes deprives the main universe of mass, disrupting its cycle of expansion, collapse and rebirth. Feeling a moral responsibility to the universe, they re-integrate Universe 647 with the main universe before departing on interstellar travel.

== Key characters ==
Cheng Xin (程心)
Aerospace engineer from the early 21st century, the proposer of the Staircase Project, the second Swordholder, and the owner of the DX3906 star system.
Yun Tianming (云天明)
Cheng Xin's undergraduate classmate and secret admirer. His brain is sent into space and captured by the Trisolaran fleet, who clones his body and returns him to life.
Thomas Wade (托马斯·维德)
The cold-hearted and ruthlessly rational PIA Chief who later leads an effort to create lightspeed propulsion.
Ai AA (艾AA)
Astronomer from the Deterrence Era; Cheng Xin's aide, friend and travelling companion.
Luo Ji (罗辑)
Cosmic sociologist, former Wallfacer, and the inaugural Swordholder. Returning character from The Dark Forest.
Guan Yifan (关一帆)
Civilian astronomer aboard the spaceship Gravity and Cheng's companion after the dark forest strike on the Solar System.

== Awards ==
Awards	
2017 Hugo Award for Best Novel	Finalist
2017 Locus Award for Best Science Fiction Novel	Won
2017 Dragon Awards for Best Science Fiction Novel	Nominated
