= SenseTime =

Chinese artificial intelligence company

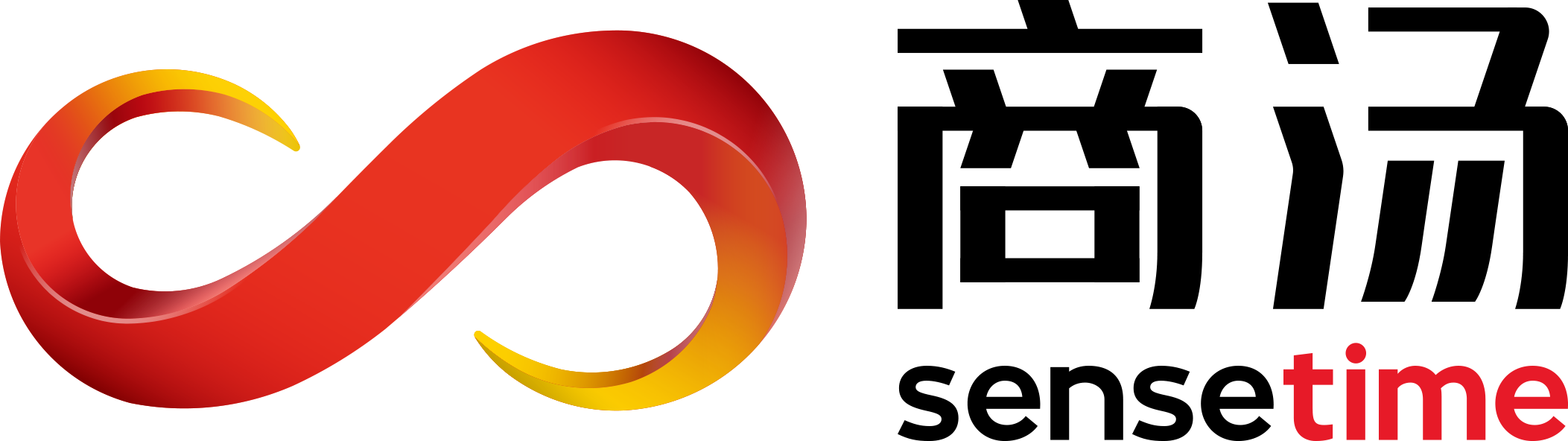

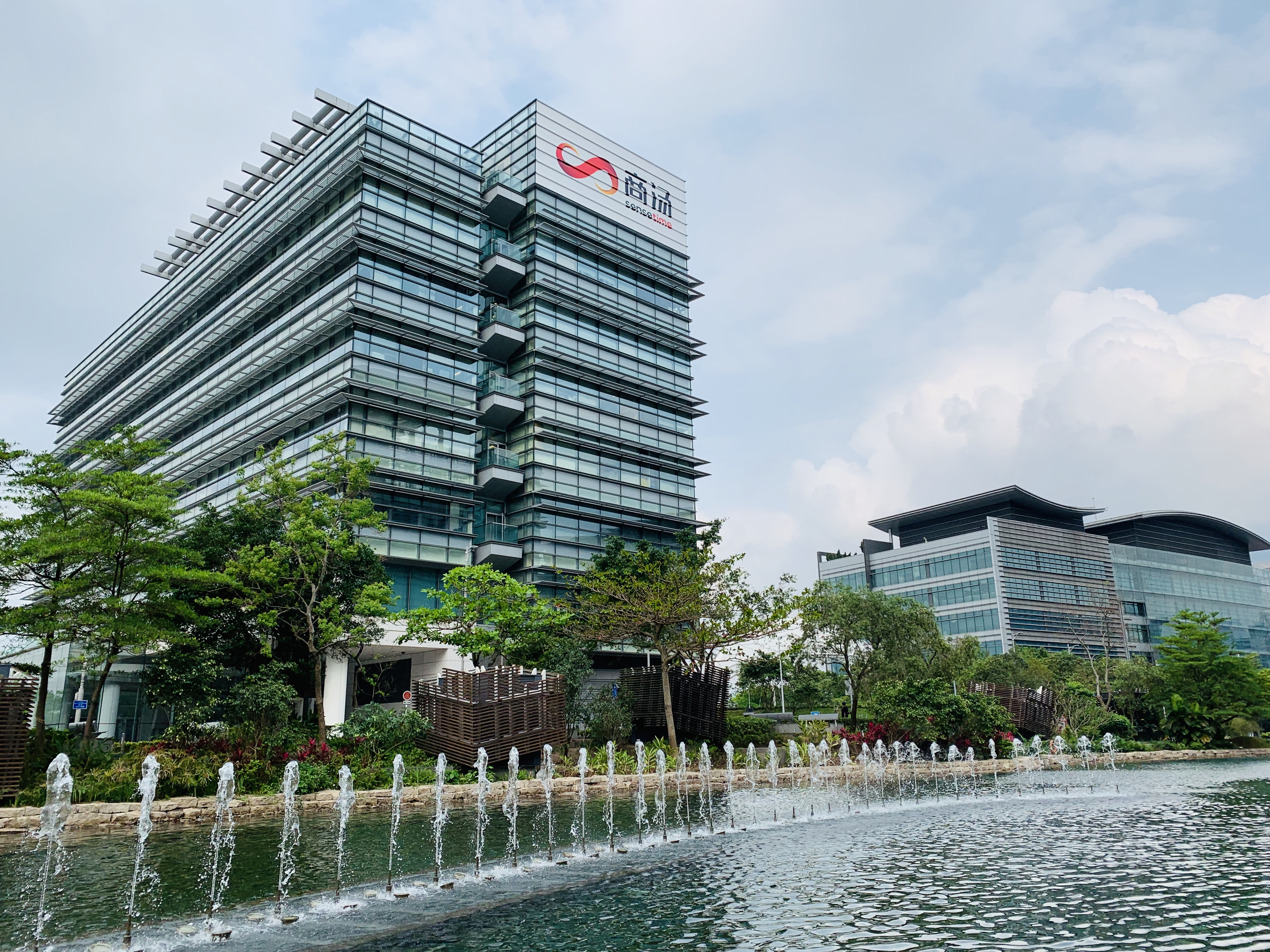
- SenseTime's Hong Kong HQ at Hong Kong Science Park
- Native name: 商汤科技
- Type: Public; partly state-owned
- Traded as: SEHK: 20
- Industry: Artificial intelligence
- Founded: October 2014; 12 years ago
- Founder: Tang Xiao'ou; Xu Li
- Headquarters: Science Park, Hong Kong
- Area served: Computer vision, deep learning, face recognition, object detection, autonomous driving, smart cities, mobile apps, fintech, education
- Number of employees: 3,000 (2019)
- Parent: China Internet Investment Fund
- Website: www.sensetime.com

SenseTime
- Simplified Chinese: 商汤科技
- Traditional Chinese: 商湯科技
Transcriptions
Standard Mandarin
- Hanyu Pinyin: Shāngtāng kējì

SenseTime is a partly state-owned publicly traded artificial intelligence company headquartered in Hong Kong. The company develops technologies including facial recognition, image recognition, object detection, optical character recognition, medical image analysis, video analysis, autonomous driving, and remote sensing. Since 2019, SenseTime has been repeatedly sanctioned by the U.S. government due to allegations that its facial recognition technology has been deployed in the mass surveillance and internment of the Uyghurs and other ethnic and religious minorities. SenseTime denies the allegations.

The China Internet Investment Fund, a state-owned enterprise under the Cyberspace Administration of China, holds a golden share ownership stake in SenseTime.

== History ==
=== 2014 ===
SenseTime was co-founded in October 2014 by Tang Xiao'ou, a professor of the Department of Information Engineering at the Chinese University of Hong Kong (CUHK), and computer scientist Xu Li, among others.

=== 2015 ===
During 2015, nine of SenseTime's papers were accepted into the Conference on Computer Vision and Pattern Recognition (CVPR).

=== 2016 ===
In 2016, 16 of SenseTime's papers were accepted in the CVPR Conference, and during the year's ImageNet competition, the company won first place in the object detection, video object detection, and scene analysis.

=== 2017 ===
In October 2017, Qualcomm entered into a collaboration agreement with SenseTime. The following month, the Shanghai Municipal Government signed a strategic alliance agreement with SenseTime. In December 2017, Honda and SenseTime signed a collaboration agreement.

In November 2017, SenseTime set up a 'smart policing' company with Leon, a major supplier of data analysis and surveillance technology in Xinjiang.

=== 2018 ===
In February 2018, SenseTime and MIT announced the creation of a programme to further advance AI research. In April 2018, SenseTime, Alibaba, and the Hong Kong Science and Technology Parks Corporation (HKSTP) partnered together to form a nonprofit artificial intelligence lab in Hong Kong. The following month, SenseTime signed a collaborative memorandum of understanding with Nanyang Technological University (NTU), the National Supercomputing Centre of Singapore and Singapore Telecommunications Limited (SingTel). In August of that same summer, SenseTime launched its first North American smart health lab in New Jersey.

In September 2018, SenseTime became one of the founding members of the Global Artificial Intelligence Academic Alliance (GAIAA), along with the Chinese University of Hong Kong, the Massachusetts Institute of Technology, the University of Sydney, Shanghai Jiao Tong University, Tsinghua University, Fudan University, Zhejiang University, Nanyang Technological University, and seven other universities.

On 20 September 2018, SenseTime was named as China's National Open Innovation Platform for Next-Generation Artificial Intelligence on Intelligent Vision. The Wall Street Journal reported that SenseTiime was valued at $7.7 billion at the end of 2018. As a result of its valuation, SenseTime is a unicorn.

China's government designated SenseTime as one of its "AI champions" in 2018.

=== 2019 ===
SenseTime joined MIT's Quest for Intelligence campaign. SenseTime has a large high-performance computing network which supports its development and fielding of AI applications. According to a report by Gregory C. Allen of the Center for a New American Security, SenseTime's computing network includes "54,000,000 Graphical Processing Unit (GPU) cores across 15,000 GPUs within 12 GPU clusters."

In April 2019, The New York Times reported that SenseTime's software was used in the development of facial recognition systems used by the Chinese government directed largely at Uyghurs. In November 2019, SenseTime led a committee tasked with developing a standard for facial recognition in China. In October 2019, SenseTime was placed on the United States Bureau of Industry and Security's Entity List for using its technology for human rights abuses in Xinjiang. Following the Entity List designation, MIT put its relationship with SenseTime under review.

=== 2020 ===
In August 2020, Bloomberg News reported that SenseTime was considering an IPO in Hong Kong.

=== 2021 ===
On 9 July, SenseTime appointed Liu Cixin as advisor to its sci-fi research project. On 19 July, SenseTime launched its international AI innovation hub in Singapore. In August, SenseTime filed for IPO on Hong Kong Stock Exchange and, in November, received regulatory approval to list. In September 2021, Axios reported that SenseTime uses a subsidiary, Shanghai SenseTime, to sidestep U.S. sanctions targeting subsidiary Beijing SenseTime.

On 10 December 2021, on Human Rights Day, the United States Department of the Treasury placed the company on an investment blacklist on its IPO pricing day because of its alleged human rights abuses in Xinjiang, banning U.S. investment in the company. The company denied the allegations, said it had "been caught in the middle of geopolitical disputes," and postponed its Hong Kong IPO plan. The company hired law firm Hughes Hubbard & Reed, which argued that the investment ban did not apply to the company's parent domiciled in the Cayman Islands.

The IPO, which had already been downsized from an expected US$2 billion to $767 million due to a PRC crackdown on tech companies, was delayed further. On 13 December, SenseTime announced that it will postpone its IPO. Its $767 million Hong Kong dollars offering was relaunched in Hong Kong on 20 December. On 30 December, SenseTime completed its IPO on the Hong Kong Stock Exchange.

=== 2022 ===
On 18 February, index compiler Hang Seng Indexes Co. added SenseTime to the Hang Seng TECH Index. On 9 August, SenseTime launched its first consumer-facing product – SenseRobot – a Chinese chess-playing robot. On 19 August, Hang Seng Indexes included SenseTime in the Hang Seng China Enterprises Index and increased its weighting in Hang Seng TECH Index from 0.15 to 1.76. On 31 October, flagship Chinese publication of SPH Media Trust, Lianhe Zaobao, inked a memorandum of understanding (MOU) with SenseTime to digitalise the newspaper's work processes for visual content.

=== 2023 ===
In February 2023, SenseTime was invited to join the government of Hong Kong's delegation's visit to Saudi Arabia. During the trip, SenseTime exchanged an MOU with King Abdullah Financial District and Sela, a cultural tourism event management company in Saudi Arabia, to deepen collaborations in areas including smart city and digital tourism. In December 2023, SenseTime's stock price fell 18% following the unexpected death of its founder Tang Xiao'ou.

In December 2023, SenseTime introduced SenseRobotGo, an interactive machine that plays the Chinese board game Go, to markets in Japan and South Korea.

=== 2024 ===
In April 2024, shares of the company surged by more than 30 percent after they announced their AI generative model, SenseNova 5.0.

In October 2024, the company stated to Nikkei Asia that they were shifting to use more Chinese domestic chips. Alvin Zou, vice president of SenseTime's Asia Pacific Operations said that their Artificial Intelligence Data Center (AIDC) in Shanghai was equipped by Huawei and Biren Technology's chips.

In December 2024, the United States Department of Defense labeled the company a "Chinese military company" operating in the U.S.

== Products and services ==
In terms of security, SenseTime's technology has been used in several Chinese police departments in order to capture criminals through video footage. This is done through SenseTotem and SenseFace systems. Meitu, a popular Chinese selfie application, also uses SenseTime's technologies to modify a users' appearance. Due to concerns of its facial recognition programs being used as surveillance to ethnic Uyghurs, the U.S. Department of the Treasury's Office of Foreign Assets Control (OFAC) identified the company as a Non-SDN Chinese Military-Industrial Complex Company (NS-CMIC) in 2021.
