= Three-Body =

2023 Chinese science fiction television series

- Genre: Science fiction; Drama
- Based on: The Three-Body Problem by Liu Cixin
- Written by: Tian Liangliang
- Directed by: Yang Lei; Vincent Yang
- Starring: Zhang Luyi; Yu Hewei; Chen Jin; Wang Ziwen; Lin Yongjian; Li Xiaoran; Kenan Heppe; Wang Chuanjun; Kou Zhenhai; He Dujuan
- Country of origin: China
- Original language: Mandarin
- No. of episodes: 30

Production
- Production companies: Tencent Video; CCTV; The Three-Body Universe; Linghe Cultural Media

Original release
- Network: CCTV
- Release: January 15 – February 3, 2023

Three-Body (Chinese: 三体) is a Chinese science fiction television series adapted from the novel The Three-Body Problem by Liu Cixin, which was first published in serialized form in 2006. The series premiered on January 15, 2023.

== Premise ==
In 2007, Wang Miao, one of China's leading nanomaterials experts, is enlisted by Shi Qiang, a detective who specializes in counterterrorism, in cases of strange apparent suicides in the scientific community. During their investigation they encounter a mysterious organization called "The Frontiers of Science" and proceed to learn the truth behind how an extraterrestrial world depicted in a popular video game connects with the fate of humanity on Earth.

== Cast ==
- Zhang Luyi as Wang Miao
- Yu Hewei as detective Shi Qiang
- Chen Jin and Wang Ziwen as Ye Wenjie
- Lin Yongjian as General Chang Weisi
- Li Xiaoran as Shen Yufei
- Li Ze Hui as Xu Bingbing
- Wang Chuanjun as Ding Yi
- Kou Zhenhai as Ye Zhetai
- He Dujuan as Yang Dong
- Kenan Heppe as Mike Evans
- Mike Koltes as Colonel Mike Williams
- Yang Rong as Mu Xing

== Production and release ==
Although Tencent obtained the rights to the novels in 2008, attempts to produce a Chinese live-action adaptation of the novels began in earnest in 2015 with The Three-Body Problem film by YooZoo Film. Filming lasted for 5 months in 2015, but the final product was never released. While YooZoo Film struck a deal in September 2020 to produce their own adaptation for Netflix with Game of Thrones showrunners David Benioff and D. B. Weiss at the helm, work on the script for a Chinese adaptation was already underway at Tencent and took four years to complete. Shooting began in July 2020 and lasted 126 days. The Beijing Electron–Positron Collider II doubled for the particle accelerator in the series.

In November 2021, a trailer for the series was released with no specific premiere date. This was followed by a second trailer in June 2022, and a final trailer 3 days prior to the premiere. After several delays, the series began airing on January 15, 2023, with the first 4 episodes available for streaming on WeTV and Rakuten Viki. The series made its first American debut on the New York PBS affiliate WNET in December 8, 2023. On February 10, 2024, NBC released the complete 30-episode English-subtitled version of "Three-Body" on its Peacock streaming platform. It is also available on Amazon Prime in the US and UK. In March 2024, Tencent released the "Three-Body Anniversary Edition", re-editing the series into 26 episodes to improve the story pacing.

== Episodes ==
Three-Body episodes
| No. | Title | Original release date |
|---|---|---|
| 1 | "Episode 1" | January 15, 2023 (CCTV); January 15, 2023 (WeTV) |
In 2007, a mysterious woman brings the results from a particle accelerator experiment to an elderly Professor Munphy, before the experiment is even carried out. Later, he commits suicide. Wang Miao, a leading figure in nanotechnology research, is recruited by detective Shi Qiang to help infiltrate "The Frontiers of Science" – a group of elite theoretical physicists, some of whom have recently apparently committed suicide. The phrase "physics doesn't exist anymore" seems to be something the deaths have in common and is also present in the suicide note of Professor Yang Dong, for whom Wang Miao feels affection after having met and photographed her during one of her experiments at the particle accelerator. In 1979, Ye Wenjie responds to a signal received by the Red Coast antenna on Radar Peak, inviting her correspondent to take Earth, as its population cannot solve its own problems.
| 2 | "Episode 2" | January 16, 2023 (CCTV); January 15, 2023 (WeTV) |
Wang Miao visits Ding Yi, Yang Dong's grieving fiancé, who recounts, in an odd game of billiards, Yang Dong's frustration at the extreme variability of the results from the particle accelerator, as well as her disturbed reaction at the evidence in Professor Munphy's death. Wang Miao reluctantly accepts his invitation in The Frontiers of Science and, upon returning to a meeting, witnesses a fellow group member's psychological deterioration when faced with the group's main hypothesis – that mankind occupies a realm of existence, the viewpoint of which dooms it into inevitable ignorance about the full nature of reality, forever stuck at the frontier of science. Later, at Yang Dong's funeral, he meets her mother – Ye Wenjie, to give her the photograph he took of her daughter, but notices an odd timestamp on it, and promises to give her a correctly developed photograph. However, at his home studio, he discovers that all of his photos have a similar timestamp. After experimenting with his old camera, he comes to the conclusion that the timestamps are a countdown that ends in 49 days.
| 3 | "Episode 3" | January 17, 2023 (CCTV); January 15, 2023 (WeTV) |
After a series of frantic experiments to determine the source of the timestamps on the photos, Wang Miao starts seeing the countdown in the center of his own vision. An ophthalmologist friend of his wife determines there's nothing physically wrong with his eyes. Out of options, he goes back to Shen Yufei of The Frontiers of Science for advice, and she suggests halting his government-supported nanotechnology experiments.
| 4 | "Episode 4" | January 18, 2023 (CCTV); January 15, 2023 (WeTV) |
The lab equipment for Wang Miao's experiments needs maintenance, which convinces him to halt the experiments. The moment the last machine stops, the countdown halts and disappears from his vision. Frustrated, he calls Shen Yufei, who tells him they are not in control of what happens. When this explanation does not suffice, she gives him a website with Morse code instructions and advises him to look for the countdown in the cosmic microwave background, as it will begin again when he restarts his nanotech trials. To convince him that she is trying to avoid him meeting the same end as Yang Dong, she tells him that the universe will flicker for him. Later, he meets Ye Wenjie at her home, where she reminisces about her daughter and confesses guilt over her fate. Afterward, detective Shi Qiang lets Wang Miao know that every dead scientist so far had come in contact with Shen Yufei shortly before committing suicide.
| 5 | "Episode 5" | January 19, 2023 (CCTV); January 16, 2023 (WeTV) |
Mu Xing, an investigative reporter, bluntly confronts detective Shi Qiang about his investigation into the suicides. Wang Miao goes to a former student of Ye Wenjie's to observe the cosmic microwave background. To their dismay, at the appointed time, it starts fluctuating in a pattern of short and long episodes, spelling out the countdown in Morse. To confirm the data, they compare it with the Ürümqi observatory and with their own eyes, using 3K glasses that compress the wavelength into visible light – the universe beyond the night sky is flickering the countdown. This drives Wang Miao to further despair until detective Shi Qiang finds him and offers him some comfort. Later, the nanotech experiments are restarted and Wang Miao gives a guest lesson at his daughter's school, affirming his belief in finding answers through science.
| 6 | "Episode 6" | January 20, 2023 (CCTV); January 17, 2023 (WeTV) |
Detective Shi Qiang gets a surprisingly efficient assistant, Xu Bingbing. After Wang Miao asks him whether there are other scientists like him – ones who came into contact with Shen Yufei, but neither became members of the Frontiers of Science nor committed suicide – he points out Ye Wenjie as an example and tells him about her past. Her grandfather met Einstein in 1922 when employed as child laborer in road construction. Her mother, also a scientist, lied and embellished that encounter, until the Cultural Revolution took hold in China. Ye Wenjie's father, however, remained relentless and refused to deny scientific theories established by the West to abide by domestic politics. Ye Wenjie is shown mourning him soon thereafter.
| 7 | "Episode 7" | January 22, 2023 (CCTV); January 18, 2023 (WeTV) |
After receiving an order from "The Lord" to either stop Wang Miao's nanotech research, or eliminate him, Shen Yufei tries to win him over by giving him a link to a virtual reality game called Three-Body. He and detective Shi Qiang enter the game and discover a world of erratic weather patterns. They experience a series of unpredictable dawns and dusks, harsh cold and scorching heat, in short succession, as they've logged in during a Chaotic Era. Another player in the game, King Wen of Zhou, explains that when Stable Eras occur, in wildly varying lengths, the climate is mild and allows for civilization to develop. The civilization in the world of Three-Body is able to dehydrate and store itself within thick buildings – such as the pyramid they are headed to, to survive Chaotic Eras. They witness two flying stars in the sky, which has been established to mean that a Stable Era will soon begin. Arriving at the pyramid, King Wen proposes to King Zhou his self-made calendar predicting the coming of the next long Stable Era. Time proves his predictions about the climate before the long Stable Era, and King Zhou orders the civilization of Three-Body to rehydrate. Dehydrated bodies are rolled out into the nearby lakes and the population is ready to continue its development.
| 8 | "Episode 8" | January 23, 2023 (CCTV); January 19, 2023 (WeTV) |
Wang Miao witnessed the destruction of the 137th civilization of the Three-Body world in the extreme cold during the game. This civilization had evolved to the level of the Warring States period. The seed of the civilization remained, and it would be restarted. Wang Miao is in awe of the extreme realism in the game; the difficulty of producing such realism is unimaginable. On the other side, General Chang Weisi monitored top scientists and the battle center protected them if there were any signs of contact or infiltration. Wang provided a list of scientists who attended a gathering and the battle center thoroughly investigated and protected them.
| 9 | "Episode 9" | January 24, 2023 (CCTV); January 20, 2023 (WeTV) |
While Chang Weisi conducts further interrogations, Wang Miao meets virtually with Shen Yufei in the world of Three-Body where the 139th civilization has reached the development of the Steam Age, but is destroyed by a bisolar day with two suns appearing in the sky. Shen Yufei and Pan Han are not only surprised by Wang Miao not stopping his research, but also him performing better in the game than both of them when first playing. Pan Han declares they won't be comrades. Later Mu Xing asks him some questions about recent research concerning environmental pollution.
| 10 | "Episode 10" | January 25, 2023 (CCTV); January 22, 2023 (WeTV) |
Xu Bingbing tells Wang Miao and detective Shi Qiang of also having asked Ding Yi some questions about the emotional state of Yang Dong before her suicide. Ding Yi recalled her being happy and finally enjoying life outside of theoretical physics. They even planned to marry and moved into a larger apartment for possible children. Wang Miao wants to talk with her mother Ye Wenjie, who then tells him her own story. During the Cultural Revolution, she was part of a working brigade in Inner Mongolia, tasked with chopping down trees. When the reporter Bai Mulin visits, she is instead tasked with helping him due to her educated background, and gets to read his copy of Silent Spring by Rachel Carson, of which he has to translate some parts. When his hands shake too much after being out all day in the cold forest, she writes a letter about its content for him.
| 11 | "Episode 11" | January 26, 2023 (CCTV); January 23, 2023 (WeTV) |
Ye Wenjie is brought to the director of her working brigade. The letter she wrote for Bai Mulin, who signed it with "Revolutionary Masses", has been discovered. Bai Mulin claims to not know of anything, and blames Ye Wenjie. Realizing her situation, she stays quiet. Due to her handwriting on the letter, and her father being a victim of the Cultural Revolution, the director declares her guilty. Ye Wenjie is offered an opportunity to sign a document regarding the events around her father, but refuses, out of respect for her memory of her father. Afterward, she is banned from the working brigade and brought to the Red Coast radio antenna on Radar Peak to be assigned new work.
| 12 | "Episode 12" | January 27, 2023 (CCTV); January 24, 2023 (WeTV) |
While detective Shi Qiang takes care of his daughter, Wang Miao logs into Three-Body again. He meets Mozi, who tells him about a new algorithm by Confucius to predict stable eras. It was already successful in predicting the dawn of a stable era, but instead of lasting five years, the sun suddenly vanished after one month and a flying star appeared. Afterward, the whole world is destroyed by the heat of a giant sun rising. Wang Miao later tells detective Shi Qiang about the level after he returned and begins to study a computer model of the algorithm, which involves two spherical shells with holes of different size rotating around the planet and a sea of fire behind them.
| 13 | "Episode 13" | January 29, 2023 (CCTV); January 25, 2023 (WeTV) |
Ye Wenjie visits Wang Miao in his research facility to inform him about some papers about her former research and continues to tell him her story. After landing on top of the mountain near a military base, she meets Yang Weining, a former student of her father who used to visit him. He offers her a chance to save her from severe consequences and clear her name through work, as her expertise in astrophysics might be useful. He doesn't tell her what the true purpose of the base is. To keep it a secret, she might never leave the base again after agreeing, but does so without hesitation. In the night, a transmission is sent by the parabola antenna and countless sparrows fall dead from the sky.
| 14 | "Episode 14" | January 30, 2023 (CCTV); January 26, 2023 (WeTV) |
Ye Wenjie is first given ordinary cleaning and technical inspection tasks on the Red Coast Base, but still shows a lot of talent and insight. Yang Weining talks with Lei Zhicheng, the commander of the Red Coast Base, about informing Ye Wenjie about its true purpose. After reflecting for a while, Lei Zhicheng agrees and meets with Ye Wenjie in the operating room. The parabola antenna and the transmissions sent are supposed to destroy other nations' satellites in orbit by using radio waves. Wang Miao later repeats everything for detective Shi Qiang, including that he found flying stars to be a former research topic for Ye Wenjie. Detective Shi Qiang then writes Ye Wenjie's name on his board and circles it several times, indicating her to be the prime suspect now.
| 15 | "Episode 15" | January 31, 2023 (CCTV); January 27, 2023 (WeTV) |
Wang Miao's daughter asks him a brain teaser that ultimately leads him to realize that the missing clue to unlocking the Three-Body game is in its title. Inside the game, he renames his character Copernicus, and explains that "three body" refers to the fact that the planet is part of a system with three suns, which unlocks level 2 of the game. Detective Shi Qiang and Xu Bingbing become increasingly suspicious of Ye Wenjie because she recommended texts to Wang Miao that helped him to unlock the game. Within level 2, a new character named von Neumann, along with Copernicus and another named Isaac Newton, create a "computer" using an army of 30 million soldiers organized into three-man logic gates in order to run the complex calculations to predict the suns' positions.
| 16 | "Episode 16" | February 1, 2023 (CCTV); January 29, 2023 (WeTV) |
The detectives visit Shen Yufei's husband Wei Cheng to question him. When they arrive he is celebrating as he has discovered the first algorithm he has been looking for. Shen Yufei walks in and tells them to leave, and the detectives note afterward that she did not treat her husband very lovingly, and suspect it's a marriage arranged for some practical gain. In the Three Body game, they have completed calculations for a two-year calendar using the human "computer". But their calculations are quickly proven wrong when an unexpected trisolar syzygy is observed, and the combined gravitational force of three suns pulls all trace of civilization off the planet. When he logs out, Wang Miao receives a phone call stating that his identity needs to be confirmed to keep playing, and he will be invited to an in-person meetup. Pan Han sneaks into Wei Cheng's house and shoots his computer as a threat to make him stop his research. Pan Han also argues with Shen Yufei about the merits of two main factions of their group: the Adventists (Pan Han) and the Redemptionists (Ye Wenjie and Shen Yufei). Pan Han has been in direct contact with "The Lord", and Shen states that she will have communication soon. The detectives realize a connection between Shen Yufei and Ye Wenjie.
| 17 | "Episode 17" | February 2, 2023 (CCTV); January 30, 2023 (WeTV) |
Shen Yufei and Ye Wenjie both have train tickets to a destination near the Red Coast, so Wang Miao and detective Shi Qiang rush to board the train themselves. Aboard the train, an assassin tries to kill Shen Yufei, but her bodyguard kills the assassin instead. The Commander is revealed to be Ye Wenjie. She mentions that they haven't received a message from The Lord in two years, but wonder if The Lord is sowing dissent among the factions. They decide the train is too dangerous and get off at the next stop. Wang Miao and detective Shi Qiang board shortly afterward, but find no sign of the women, except the assassin's dead body. Wang Miao calls Ye Wenjie to try to get more information, and she mentions she's traveling out of town. He asks if she would show him the Red Coast, and she says yes. Ye Wenjie and Shen Yufei inspect the secret communications base they have set up in the abandoned Red Coast radio antenna on Radar Peak, and The Commander tells them the efforts are now futile: pack everything up and leave no trace. She calls Pan Han and says she is ready to meet with Evans. A few hours later, Wang Miao arrives. She gives him a tour of the now-empty base and tells him more about her time working there.
| 18 | "Episode 18" | February 3, 2023 (CCTV); January 31, 2023 (WeTV) |
Ye Wenjie continues telling Wang Miao about her time working at Red Coast. She reveals the secret true purpose of the base, which was to search for extraterrestrial intelligence before other powerful nations made contact. Later the base became devoted solely to scientific research, and eventually ran out of funding to remain operational. She speaks of the utter loneliness of being stuck at the base, listening to the static noise of the universe day after day.
| 19 | "Episode 19" | February 5, 2023 (CCTV); February 1, 2023 (WeTV) |
Ye Wenjie meets with Mike Evans after Wang Miao leaves Red Coast. Evans talks about building the "Second Red Coast" on a large ship. She asks if he has changed transmission methods, but he dodges the question and says: "The Lord is coming", and humans are in an inferno that she started. Shi Qiang, Xu Bingbing and Wang Miao finally get to examine the classified files concerning Red Coast, which show that the base reported no contact with aliens. Xu Bingbing finds that Ye Wenjie and Yang Weining married in 1973; and that on the same day in October 1979, Yang Weining and Lei Zhicheng died "in the line of duty", in both cases reported as: "Mountaintop platform – Fell to his death". (This was the same year that Ye Wenjie was shown responding to a signal received by the Red Coast antenna (apparently from aliens) in the series' first episode.) They continue to investigate Ye Wenjie, and she tells Wang Miao that there are multiple explanations for the Fermi paradox but doesn't divulge any more information. Wei Cheng comes to the police station to report a crime. He explains his backstory to the detectives: He had natural math talent from an early age but struggled to apply himself. Eventually he gave up and went to live in a temple, where the Buddhist priest told him that he needed to empty himself. When he tried doing this, his imagination created three spheres in that emptiness, and he watched their orbital dance, which caused him to finally fall asleep. At last, he enjoyed doing math and had found a problem that he was excited to solve. (The Buddhist priest in Wei Cheng's flashback was seen in conversation with Shen Yufei in earlier episodes set in the series' present (2007). By then he is referred to as Professor Han.)
| 20 | "Episode 20" | February 6, 2023 (CCTV); February 2, 2023 (WeTV) |
Wei Cheng continues his story. A woman named Shen Yufei visited him at the temple and asked him to join her. She provided him with a quiet place to work and access to expensive supercomputers. They married for mutual convenience. After Pan Han threatened to kill him if he didn't stop his research, Shen Yufei threatened to kill him if he did stop it. Wei Cheng gives a completed Three Body model to Wang Miao, who logs on to the game in order to test it. He finds a forlorn Einstein, who says that no one has been able to solve the Three Body problem. Wang Miao meets the game's Secretary-General of the United Nations and shows him Wei Cheng's solution, but the secretary-general states that they have already seen many similar models and have proof that the problem is unsolvable. A giant moon rises, and the secretary-general explains that it is a remnant from the "Great Tear", when all three suns passed close to the planet and tore it to pieces that then reformed into two spheres. The Three Body system once had 12 planets, all but one being destroyed in the past. They realized that their planet would eventually be swallowed by a sun, and the only remaining solution was to head for the stars and find a new solar system. Afterward, Pan Han reveals the true meaning of the game to Shen Yufei: To help humans know The Lord. He then shoots and kills her.
| 21 | "Episode 21" | February 7, 2023 (CCTV); February 3, 2023 (WeTV) |
Pan Han is interrogated as the main suspect in the murder of Shen Yufei, but the surveillance cameras show a totally different chain of events than what has happened. Pan Han visited her and then left, before Shen Yufei committed suicide. Pan Han is left to go. Wang Miao and detective Shi Qiang then discuss about further investigations and Wang Miao visits a meeting of other Three-Body players afterward. A passionate discussion about humanity needing external help arises and is endorsed by some of them. The extinction of the Aztecs after the arrival of the Spanish is brought up, which allowed the rise of a more advanced civilization. Pan Han welcomes everyone agreeing in the Earth-Trisolaris Organization and declares them comrades. After being informed, Chang Weisi demands a tougher approach on this organization while Pan Han calls Mike Evans to demand the shutdown of all Three-Body servers.
| 22 | "Episode 22" | February 8, 2023 (CCTV); February 5, 2023 (WeTV); February 3, 2023 (WeTV premier access) |
Wang Miao enters the Three-Body game, where the current civilization is capable of interstellar travel and has realized the urgent need to escape their homeworld. An interstellar fleet with thousands of spaceships has gathered in orbit and is dispatched to a star a little more than four-light years away, which hosts a habitable planet in an eternal stable era. Wang Miao is confused and reminded of Earth. He is furthermore told that the interstellar fleet can reach 10% of the speed of light and will arrive in around 400 years. Meanwhile, the military has tracked down the server to be located in a satellite in space, which is then shut down by Pan Han. Wang Miao gets one last message, that the Trisolaran expedition to the new world has begun, that their fleet is still in flight and that he can fulfill his promise by attending an upcoming meeting of the Earth-Trisolaris Organization (ETO). Wang Miao meets detective Shi Qiang. Both are confused about the time of arrival (four light-years with 10% the speed of light only takes 40 years) and wonder when the fleet left. Detective Shi Qiang mentions it could arrive any time now. Meanwhile, Mu Xing looks through old documents to gather information about the leader of the organization and is killed afterward. Detective Shi Qiang, who knows that Mu Xing has hidden additional recorders, finds one in her motorcycle. The recorder reveals that she has tracked down the leader to the Tsinghua university. Detective Shi Qiang immediately thinks of Ye Wenjie.
| 23 | "Episode 23" | February 9, 2023 (CCTV); February 6, 2023 (WeTV); February 3, 2023 (WeTV premier access) |
Ye Wenjie discovers that some deleted documents from the ETO on her computer have been restored. It is revealed that Yang Dong found them shortly before her suicide (connecting to the beginning of Death's End). Ye Wenjie visits her grave afterward and meets an old friend (connecting to the beginning of The Dark Forest), before heading to the ETO meeting. Meanwhile, detective Shi Qiang gives Wang Miao a few last instructions about the following assault. Detective Shi Qiang heads back to his team while Wang Miao joins the ETO meeting. Pan Han enters the stage and demands the Redemptionists to be purged from the organization as he fears they will plead their alliance to the government as soon as the organization is exposed. After Ye Wenjie arrives and is revealed as the leader, a discussion is sparked about the Adventists, who don't follow her idea of reforming humanity any more, but seek complete destruction. A member discloses that Mike Evans lied to the whole organization. Ye Wenjie condemns Pan Han, an Adventist, for killing Shen Yufei, a former Adventist (but Redemptionist at heart), and betrayal of the ETO. Pan Han is murdered as a result. Ye Wenjie recognizes Wang Miao in the crowd and reveals that his technology has to be extinguished as it will enable humanity to build space elevators. Afterward, she starts to tell the story of her time at the Red Coast Base for new members, beginning with the time she started researching a new mathematical model for the sun.
| 24 | "Episode 24" | February 10, 2023 (CCTV); February 7, 2023 (WeTV); February 3, 2023 (WeTV premier access) |
Ye Wenjie notices in a publication by the American physicist Harry Peterson, that unnatural data was detected on two days she carried out experiments for her research. Confused, she sends him a letter for more information and finds a full match with her own data. She finds out that a radio wave within a certain range of frequency can penetrate through the convection zone into the radiation zone of the sun and be amplified. As the antenna of the Red Coast Base can send within this frequency range, it can use the sun itself as a much stronger antenna. Ye Wenjie tells Yang Weining about her findings, but he rejects any experiment, as shooting radio waves at the red sun could be misinterpreted in the current tense political climate. Ye Wenjie secretly sends out a transmission, which is discovered by Yang Weining. Due to an unknown reason, her experiment is thought to have failed, but the older Ye Wenjie tells that back then, the first interstellar message from humanity raced into the universe. More than eight years later, Ye Wenjie is now married to Yang Weining. Ye Wenjie listens to radio waves from space and suddenly recognizes a structure within. The decoding system does as well and gives out the first alien message beginning with: "Do not answer!"
| 25 | "Episode 25" | February 12, 2023 (CCTV); February 8, 2023 (WeTV); February 3, 2023 (WeTV premier access) |
Ye Wenjie decodes the entire alien message and the urgent warning therein. An alien pacifist warns her to not answer as otherwise the exact location of Earth will be revealed and the Earth will be invaded as a result. Ye Wenjie uses cosmic noise to cover up the alien message and sends an answer nonetheless, to tell the aliens, that humanity is in desperate need of an external force. She goes outside and falls unconscious. After she wakes up, Yang Weining tells her that he knows she is pregnant. While Ye Wenjie tells this, detective Shi Qiang and his team start their assault on the ETO meeting. After ETO members use small nuclear weapons to threaten them, detective Shi Qiang exploits a moment of confusion to shoot at the bombs, only causing detonation of the outer explosive. Detective Shi Qiang is brought into the hospital and Ye Wenjie is brought into interrogation, where she admits the murder of two people: Lei Zhichang and Yang Weining. Lei Zhicheng, who had a hidden monitoring system installed, discovered the alien message and confronted Ye Wenjie. Unaware that she already answered, he uses security concerns, her background, his friendship with Yang Weining and her pregnancy to manipulate her into silence. Ye Wenjie realizes that Lei Zhichang wants to go down in history as the one who discovered alien life, and already decided on her next steps before leaving.
| 26 | "Episode 26" | February 13, 2023 (CCTV); February 9, 2023 (WeTV); February 3, 2023 (WeTV premier access) |
Ye Wenjie manipulates the Earthing System of the Red Coast Base by loosening the ground wire to force Lei Zhicheng to descend the mountain for a system check during a snow storm. Before she can cut the rope with a specially prepared saw to make it look like the rope tore apart naturally, Yang Weining arrives and wants to help Lei Zhicheng. Ye Wenjie requests him to use a second rope and Yang Weining asks her to get one. When she returns, Yang Weining has already descended using the same rope as Lei Zhicheng. Realizing that she might never get a chance like this again, she cuts the rope, killing both of them and hence keeping the alien message secret. Back in the present, Wang Miao leaves the interrogation to meet detective Shi Qiang in hospital, but he asks him to return to the interrogation and tell him afterward. Xu Bingbing arrives and gives detective Shi Qiang the medical examination. Because of the radiation exposure from the small nuclear bomb, he won't have much time left. Detective Shi Qiang asks Xu Bingbing to not tell Wang Miao. Back at the interrogation, Ye Wenjie recounts, that nobody suspected her as her and Yang Weining were a happy couple. The security requirements were loosened shortly after, she started teaching children from the nearby village and was invited into many homes. When she gave birth to Yang Dong and lost a lot of blood, countless villagers started donating to save her. As a result, Ye Wenjie slowly forgot her betrayal, which felt more like a hallucination. She was allowed to leave the Red Coast Base shortly after, stripping her of the possibility of further interstellar communication, and returned to the Tsinghua university, also visiting her mother after years again.
| 27 | "Episode 27" | February 14, 2023 (CCTV); February 10, 2023 (WeTV); February 3, 2023 (WeTV premier access) |
Half a year after returning to the Tsinghua university, Ye Wenjie is enlisted in designing a new radio astronomy observatory. When visiting the location, she is asked by locals unable to understand or speak English to visit a foreign man from the United States, who came all the way just to plant trees to save a certain bird from extinction. Ye Wenjie first meets Mike Evans and learns of his life story, that also lead him to see the evil side of humanity. As a child of a billionaire who pumped and traded oil, he witnessed nature being destroyed by it and his father not caring at all, claiming the survival of humanity is a priority. Ye Wenjie returned to Beijing and received a letter from Mike Evans many years later. When meeting him again, he tells her that his father died and gave almost all of the inheritance to him (worth of $4.5 billion) instead of his siblings, maybe because of guilt or respect for his ideals, which include that all species are equal. After Mike Evans mentions that even the massive inheritance he gained will not be enough to change humanity, Ye Wenjie expresses her ideals, which include that humanity can no longer rely on their own power to change. Realizing the common goal, she tells him everything about the Trisolarans. Mike Evans wants to confirm her story and declares them comrades. Three years later, Ye Wenjie receives another invitation by Mike Evans, who has purchased a giant tanker, called the Judgment Day, and built a second Red Coast Base into it. Mike Evans tells Ye Wenjie that her story has been confirmed. The Judgment Day has received messages from the Trisolarans, whose massive invasion fleet has already departed and will reach the Earth in around 400 years. Mike Evans has gathered a few people with the same ideals as both of them and declares the birth of the Earth-Trisolaris Organization (ETO) as a fifth column. When shouting "Eliminate human tyranny!" ("毁灭人类暴政!"), the crowd responds with "The world belongs to Trisolaris!" ("世界属于三体!"). Hearing all of this, Chang Weisi points out that none of the factions of the ETO (the Redemptionists, the Adventists and the Survivors) follow her original ideal of reforming humanity any more. Ye Wenjie admits that she may have started the fire, but lost control over it long ago. Afterward, Chang Weisi asks the last and most important question, which is if the Trisolarans have only sent radio waves toward the Earth.
| 28 | "Episode 28" | February 15, 2023 (CCTV); February 12, 2023 (WeTV); February 3, 2023 (WeTV premier access) |
During her interrogation, Ye Wenjie explains the propulsion of the Trisolaran fleet is based on matter-antimatter annihilation. Ding Yi uses this to confirm the predicted time of arrival of the fleet in roughly 400 years. Ye Wenjie further describes that the Trisolarans have shot two sophons toward the Solar System six years ago (2001), which have reached Earth two years ago (2005) and have since blocked the progress of human science completely. After Chang Weisi asks why she hasn't told her daughter about external influence before her suicide, Wang Miao requests to talk with Ye Wenjie. She admits to him that the death of physics only collapsed half the life of Yang Dong, but finding out the truth about her mother, the secret documents on her computer and conspiracy with the Trisolarans, collapsed the other half (as described at the beginning of Death's End). Wang Miao leaves and meets Ding Yi outside. They discuss the possibility of two sophons blocking the progress of science and the structure of elementary particles. Ding Yi uses a cigarette filter to explain that plenty of low-dimensional structures can be saved in a higher-dimensional structure and hence elementary particles, for which eleven dimensions exist due to compactification, can have enormous complexity. Ding Yi assumes that the Trisolarans are technically capable of accessing and using this interior complexity. Wang Miao asks Ding Yi for more of his thoughts, but he declines and claims he would not be able to sleep any longer otherwise after hearing those thoughts (which will later be mentioned in Death's End). Wang Miao and detective Shi Qiang join a meeting with Chang Weisi, Colonel Shanton and other generals to discuss methods to raid the Judgment Day and retrieve the alien messages kept within. Ideas like ball lightning weapons or infrasonic weapons are proposed, but rejected due to being too slow or weak. As an obvious assault could lead to the deletion of the alien messages, detective Shi Qiang proposes to span countless (invisible) nano filaments, which Wang Miao is working on, over the Panama canal, through which the Judgment Day will pass in four days. The ship passing through them would be cut into slices; the entire crew would be killed. Even if the hard drives are sliced, the sharp cuts could be rejoined. The plan, called operation Guzheng after a Chinese instrument, is approved.
| 29 | "Episode 29" | February 16, 2023 (CCTV); February 13, 2023 (WeTV); February 3, 2023 (WeTV premier access) |
Wang Miao and Colonel Shanton oversee the final preparations of the operation Guzheng in the Gaillard Canal. The two pillars with the nano filaments spanning over the canal are set up and construction workers as well as soldiers go into hiding. Colonel Shanton talks with Wang Miao about how everything feels insignificant now and compares the canal, which connects two oceans, with the nano filaments, which will one day connect Earth with space (hinting at The Dark Forest). The Judgment Day arrives and passes through the zither. Mike Evans unsuccessfully tries to delete the alien messages in his final moments before he is killed. The sliced up Judgment Day crashes into the riverbank and the data is retrieved. Chang Weisi tells Ye Wenjie of the outcome and that the data surpassed their wildest imaginations. Wang Miao and detective Shi Qiang are requested to enter the Three-Body game, which the ETO programmed some of the data into. They encounter the depiction of a Trisolaran, a speculation of the ETO according to some true data, and witness the arrival of the message from Ye Wenjie from 1971 in its listening post. The listener is desperate to save the distant paradise from the cruel Trisolaran civilization, and sends the warning received by Ye Wenjie in 1979. The listener is caught and brought to the princeps for trial. The princeps denounces the listener as the biggest criminal in all the reincarnated Trisolaran civilizations and decides to punish him by keeping him alive to witness the day on which humanity loses all hope, then killing him. Wang Miao notices that Ye Wenjie was allowed to enter the game as well to see this. Although the location of Earth will not be known to the Trisolarans until the response of Ye Wenjie, the princeps demands the fleet to be dispatched as fast as possible in the direction of the signal.
| 30 | "Episode 30" | February 17, 2023 (CCTV); February 14, 2023 (WeTV); February 3, 2023 (WeTV premier access) |
Wang Miao and detective Shi Qiang tell Chang Weisi and Ding Yi about their findings in the game: The Trisolarans pursued three plans to block the progress of human science. The first plan, code-named "coloring", was to commission the ETO to publicize the negative effects of science like environmental destruction to spread hate for and fear of science. This was mostly done by Shen Yufei and Pan Han using The Frontiers of Science. The second plan, code-named "miracle", was to show signs of supernatural power to humans to make unscientific ways of thinking dominate scientific ways of thinking and turn their own imagination into a weapon against them. This was the mysterious countdown and the flickering universe. The third plan however, code-named "sophon", will ultimately and inevitably suffocate human science. The Trisolarans have even scrapped their plans for a huge particle accelerator and another interstellar fleet to devote all resources to it. Wang Miao and detective Shi Qiang are shown back in the Three-Body game, where the Trisolarans have unfolded a proton into two dimensions, which encloses the entire planet and is kept in orbit by electromagnetic beams. Circuits are constructed on the surface of the proton using the strong interaction. Four protons are converted to quantum computers, called sophons, and connected together using quantum entanglement. Two sophons are launched toward earth and two sophons are kept to enable instant communication between the Earth, the Trisolaran world and the Trisolaran fleet. The sophons on Earth are able to manipulate supercollider experiments by serving as a target, create symbols on a retina or photograph by controlling light exposure, and secretly spy on all dialogue. Chang Weisi gathers Wang Miao, detective Shi Qiang, Colonel Shanton and other generals to declare that humanity will have no secrets from the enemy in the upcoming war. All of them notice strange lights and realize the sophons are present. The Trisolarans express their contempt for humanity by creating the last message "You are bugs!" on the assembled generals' retinas. For her crimes against humanity, Ye Wenjie is sentenced for life in prison, but she is allowed to visit the ruins of the Red Coast Base one last time and calls her last sunset the sunset of humanity. Meanwhile, Wang Miao and Ding Yi succumb to defeatism and alcoholism together. Detective Shi Qiang visits them and they explain to him, that no matter how sharp a knife is, it just cannot win against a gun. Detective Shi Qiang takes them to his home village, where plenty of bugs are crawling around the fields. He reminds them that humans have tried for decades to exterminate bugs by multiple means, but failed. Together they pour their beer onto the fields to pay respect to the bugs. In a post-credit scene, a professor from the Tsinghua university sits in an ice cream shop and writes a story on his laptop.

== Reception ==
Three-Body has received wide acclaim in China. On Douban, the series received a score of 8.7 out of 10. Viewers praised the overall production quality, the faithfulness of the adaptation and the casting. Domestic critics praised the visuals as astonishing.

In the United States, The New York Times critic Mike Hale noted that the series was faithful to the original text, with logical adaptations made to suit television. However, he described the screenplay and cast as mediocre, and the virtual reality game presentation not as elaborately portrayed compared to the novels.

== Awards and nominations ==
The following table presents all known awards and nominations the series has received, indicating the name of the award ceremony, the year the nomination/award, the relevant award category, the nominated work or individual(s), and whether the award was won, along with the citation(s) from which the information was derived.

Award Nominations and Wins—Tabulated Details
| Award ceremony | Year | Category | Work / Other Nominee | Nominated / Won | Ref. |
|---|---|---|---|---|---|
| Asia Contents Awards & Global OTT Awards | 2023 | Best Visual Effects | Three-Body | Nominated | |
