= Kaiming He =

Chinese-American computer scientist and professor

- Education: Tsinghua University (BS); Chinese University of Hong Kong (PhD)
- Scientific career
- Fields: Computer science
- Workplaces: Microsoft Research Asia (2011–2016); Facebook Artificial Intelligence Research (2016–2024); Massachusetts Institute of Technology (2024–present)
- Thesis: Single image haze removal using dark channel prior (2011)
- Doctoral advisor: Tang Xiao'ou
- Website: people.csail.mit.edu/kaiming

Kaiming He (Chinese: 何恺明; pinyin: Hé Kǎimíng) is a Chinese computer scientist who primarily researches computer vision and deep learning. He is an associate professor at Massachusetts Institute of Technology and works part-time as a Distinguished Scientist at Google DeepMind. He is known as one of the creators of the residual neural network (ResNet) architecture.

== Early life and education ==
He attended the public Guangzhou Zhixin High School in Guangzhou, Guangdong, China. He scored first place for the total scores in the 2003 Guangdong provincial undergraduate admissions exam. He went to Tsinghua University for undergraduate education and received a Bachelor of Science degree in 2007. In 2007 to 2011, he pursued doctoral studies in information engineering at the Chinese University of Hong Kong at its Multimedia Laboratory, receiving a PhD degree in 2011. His doctoral dissertation was titled Single image haze removal using dark channel prior (2011), and his doctoral adviser was Tang Xiao'ou.

== Career ==
He worked at Microsoft Research Asia from 2011 to 2016 and at Facebook Artificial Intelligence Research from 2016 to 2024. In 2024, he became an associate professor at the Department of Electrical Engineering and Computer Science of the Massachusetts Institute of Technology.

His 2016 paper Deep Residual Learning for Image Recognition is the most cited research paper in 5 years according to Google Scholar's reports in 2020 and 2021.

== Awards and recognitions ==
He won ICCV's best paper award (Marr Prize) in 2017 and CVPR's best paper award in 2009 and 2016.

He was awarded the 2023 Future Science Prize along with 3 collaborators for "fundamental contribution to artificial intelligence by introducing deep residual learning".
