= China Internet Investment Fund =

Chinese state-owned investment fund

China Internet Investment Fund Management Co. Ltd.
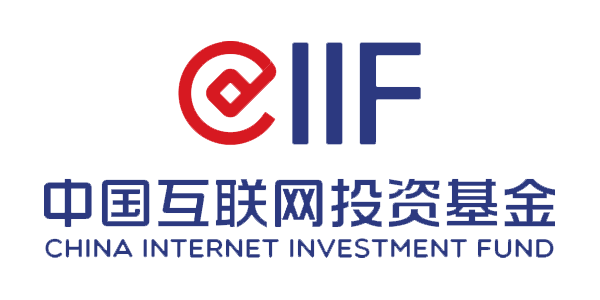
- Native name: 中国互联网投资基金
- Company type: State-owned enterprise
- Industry: Investment management
- Founded: 22 January 2017; 9 years ago
- Headquarters: Beijing, China
- Key people: Wu Hai (Chairman)
- AUM: ¥100 billion RMB (approx US$15 billion)
- Parent: Cyberspace Administration of China; Ministry of Finance
- Website: www.ciifund.cn

The China Internet Investment Fund (CIIF; Chinese: 中国互联网投资基金; pinyin: Zhōngguó Hùliánwǎng Tóuzījījīn) is a China Government Guidance Fund. The fund focuses on the internet sector including cybersecurity, artificial intelligence, big data, cloud computing and other services that are in line with national strategies and help develop the digital economy of China.

Notable companies that the fund has golden share ownership in include ByteDance, Sina Corporation, SenseTime and Kuaishou.

== History ==
On 22 January 2017, CIIF was established as a 100 billion yuan fund by the Cyberspace Administration of China and Ministry of Finance to support investments in the internet sector. An initial 30 billion yuan funding came from firms including ICBC, China Mobile, China Unicom and CITIC Guoan Group. ICBC, China Development Bank and Agricultural Bank of China would provide financial services and a 150 billion yuan line of credit. The aim of the fund was to turn China into a major player in internet technology and to facilitate Premier Li Keqiang's Internet Plus strategy.

CIIF makes use of golden shares that enable it to exercise significant control over companies it invested in despite low ownership. For example, it holds a 1% stake in a subsidiary of ByteDance and appoints one of the three board members of that unit, which holds key licenses for ByteDance's domestic short-video business. Another example is Sina, where it acquired a 1% stake for only 10.7 million yuan ($1.5 million).

In January 2023, CIIF acquired golden shares in two local divisions of the Alibaba Group that control Youku and UCWeb.

== Investments ==
- ByteDance
- CloudWalk Technology
- Kuaishou
- SenseTime
- Sina Corporation
