= The Three-Body Problem (animated TV series) =

- Official poster
- 三体 ANIMATION
- Genre: Science fiction
- Based on: The Dark Forest by Liu Cixin
- Developed by: Lin Qi
- Written by: Lin Minghao; Ji Jing; Chen Wei; Zhu Beining; Gu Yi; Gao Jiade; Li Hongyang; Fang Hui; Jian Minglang; Wang Tianze; Lyu Rui; Xu Shanliang
- Directed by: Lin Minghao
- Voices of: Ma Zhengyang; Fan Zhechen; Duan Yixuan; Zhao Chengchen; Yang Chen
- Music by: Min He; BingYin Yang
- Country of origin: China
- Original language: Mandarin
- No. of seasons: 1
- No. of episodes: 15

Production
- Producers: Chen Rui; Zhu Beining
- Production companies: Bilibili; The Three-Body Universe; YHKT Entertainment

Original release
- Network: Bilibili
- Release: December 10, 2022 – March 25, 2023

The Three-Body Problem (Chinese: 三体 ANIMATION; pinyin: Sāntǐ Animation; lit. 'Three-Body Animation') is a Chinese science fiction animated series based on The Dark Forest by Liu Cixin. The series was produced by Bilibili, The Three-Body Universe and YHKT Entertainment, and aired on Bilibili from December 10, 2022, to March 25, 2023.

== Voice cast ==
- Ma Zhengyang as Luo Ji (罗辑)
- Fan Zhechen as Shi Qiang (史强)
- Duan Yixuan as Zhuang Yan (庄颜) and Elina
- Zhao Chengchen as Wang Miao (汪淼) and Ding Yi (丁仪)
- Yang Chen as Ye Wenjie (叶文洁)

== Episode list ==
No.	Title	Original release date
1	"Tower of Meaning"; Transliteration: "Yìyì Zhī Tǎ" (Chinese: 意义之塔)	December 10, 2022
2	"The Distant Archer"; Transliteration: "Yáoyuǎn de Shèshǒu" (Chinese: 遥远的射手)	December 10, 2022
3	"Verne Island"; Transliteration: "Fán ĕr nà Dǎo" (Chinese: 凡尔纳岛)	December 17, 2022
4	"Inside the Light Core"; Transliteration: "Guāng Zhuī zhī Nei" (Chinese: 光锥之内)	December 24, 2022
5	"The Laughter of the Opposite Wall"; Transliteration: "Duìmiàn Bi zhĕ de Xiào" (Chinese: 对面壁者的笑)	December 31, 2022
6	"A Gentle Yoke"; Transliteration: "Wēnhè de è" (Chinese: 温和的轭)	January 7, 2023
7	"The Eyes of the Sunset"; Transliteration: "Wǎnxià de Yǎnjīng" (Chinese: 晚霞的眼睛)	January 14, 2023
8	"The Highest Importance"; Transliteration: "Zuìgāo de Zhòngshì" (Chinese: 最高的重视)	January 21, 2023
9	"Cosmic Fairy Tale"; Transliteration: "Yŭzhòu Tónghuà" (Chinese: 宇宙童话)	January 28, 2023
10	"The Death of the Fireflies"; Transliteration: "Yínghuŏngchòng zhī sĭ" (Chinese: 萤火虫之死)	February 4, 2023
11	"Grave of Brown Ants"; Transliteration: "Hè Yĭ zhī Mù" (Chinese: 褐蚁之墓)	February 11, 2023
12	"Basic Picture"; Transliteration: "Jībĕn Tújĭng" (Chinese: 基本图景)	March 4, 2023
13	"Cosmic Twilight"; Transliteration: "Yŭzhòu Shǎnshuò" (Chinese: 宇宙闪烁)	March 11, 2023
14	"Collapse"; Transliteration: "Tānsuō" (Chinese: 坍缩)	March 18, 2023
15	"The Eternal Bonfire"; Transliteration: "Yŏnghèng de Gōuhuŏ" (Chinese: 永恒的篝火)	March 25, 2023

== Production and release ==
The animated series was announced by Bilibili in October 2022. The series was adapted from The Dark Forest by Liu Cixin, the author's second installment in the Remembrance of Earth's Past science fiction novel trilogy. Three-Body Universe, the IP developer that was involved in the production of the live-action Chinese TV series and the Netflix version, and animation studio YHKT Entertainment co-produced the series with Bilibili. The 15-episode series was scheduled to be released in China on December 3, 2022, but was postponed to December 10.
