= The Three-Body Problem in Minecraft =

Chinese animated series

- 我的三体
- Genre: Science fiction, action, machinima
- Based on: The Three-Body Problem and The Dark Forest by Liu Cixin
- Directed by: Li Zhenyi (李圳宜)
- Country of origin: China
- Original language: Mandarin
- No. of seasons: 4

Original release
- Network: Bilibili, AcFun
- Release: 27 February 2014

The Three-Body Problem in Minecraft (Chinese: 我的三体; pinyin: Wǒdè Sāntǐ; lit. 'My Three-Body') is a Chinese network animated series based on the science fiction trilogy Remembrance of Earth's Past by Liu Cixin. The animation began as an unofficial machinima doujin work, but from the second season onward, it became an official adaptation.

== Production ==
At the time of the project's undertaking, the animation's director, Li Zhenyi (李圳宜), was a student at the University of Pau and the Adour Region. As a fan of the Three-Body Problem, he was often asked about the novel, so he decided to use Minecraft to make an animated adaption of the work. Initially he was the only person involved in production aside from voice acting, managing screenplay, audition performances, and scene design all by himself. Due to the lack of technical experience and financial constraints, the first season was relatively unprofessional, but nevertheless managed to attract interest in helping with the production. After the fourth episode, the creators set up a production team, and after the ninth, they converted to animation production.

With the debut of the second season, quality was further improved with the addition of lighting and character expressions. It also became an official adaptation, allowing the team to receive financial support and official licensing from the publishers of the original novel.

== Seasons ==
| Series | Subtitle | Episodes | Originally released | |
| Series | Subtitle | Episodes | First released | Last released |
|---|---|---|---|---|
| 1 | – | 11 | 27 February 2014 | 6 October 2015 |
| 2 | The Legend of Luo Ji | 11 | 9 June 2016 | 9 March 2018 |
| 3 | The Legend of Zhang Beihai | 9 | 21 January 2020 | 10 March 2020 |
| 4 | – | 9 | 14 June 2024 | 8 September 2024 |

The average episode lasts about 20 minutes.

During the first season, there was a six-month gap between episodes 10 and 11. After the second episode of season two, updates were discontinued for a long time, before resuming in January 2018.

== Reception ==
The reception of the series was largely positive. On the Chinese social website Douban and video website Bilibili, the animation received an overall rating of 9.7/10.

According to the People's Daily, the creators' animation, voice-acting, scene design, and editing achieve a quality similar to sci-fi movies utilizing Minecraft's voxel art style. They also commended the quality of the animation, especially in the third season. The Paper also praised it, stating that since the production team were fans of the original novel, they could preserve its distinctively appealing details, and adapt the plot in a rich and compelling manner.

In 2015, the production team was awarded the Silver Prize of the Xingyun Awards.

Outside of China, users have uploaded the series onto YouTube.
