= Hobbesian trap =

Theory explaining why preemptive attacks occur

The Hobbesian trap (or Schelling's dilemma) is a theory that explains why preemptive strikes occur between two groups, out of bilateral fear of an imminent attack. Without outside influences, this situation will lead to a fear spiral (catch-22, vicious circle, Nash equilibrium) in which fear will lead to an arms race which in turn will lead to increasing fear. The Hobbesian trap can be explained in terms of game theory. Although cooperation would be the better outcome for both sides, mutual distrust leads to the adoption of strategies that have negative outcomes for both individual players and all players combined. The theory has been used to explain outbreaks of conflicts and violence, spanning from individuals to states.

== History ==
An early example of Hobbesian trap reasoning is Thucydides's analysis of the Peloponnesian War in Ancient Greece. Thucydides presented that fear and distrust towards the other side led to an escalation of violence. The theory is most commonly associated with English philosopher Thomas Hobbes. Nobel Prize winner Thomas Schelling also saw fear as a motive for conflict. Applying game theory to the Cold War and nuclear strategy, Schelling's view was that in situations where two parties are in conflict but share a common interest, the two sides will often reach a tacit agreement rather than resort to open conflict.

== Examples ==
Psychology professor Steven Pinker is a proponent of the theory of the Hobbesian trap and has applied the theory to many conflicts and outbreaks of violence between people, groups, tribes, societies and states. Issues of gun control have been described as a Hobbesian trap. A common example is the dilemma that both the armed burglar and the armed homeowner face when they meet each other. Neither side may want to shoot, but both are afraid of the other party shooting first so they may be inclined to fire preemptively, although the favorable outcome for both parties would be that nobody be shot.

A similar example between two states is the Cuban Missile Crisis. Fear and mutual distrust between the actors increased the likelihood of a preemptive strike. Hobbesian traps in nuclear weapons' case can be defused if both sides can threaten second strike, which is the capacity to retaliate with nuclear force after the first attack. This is the basis of mutual assured destruction.

The Dark Forest, a science fiction novel by Liu Cixin, incorporates a Hobbesian trap into its narrative. The dark forest hypothesis, both diegetically and non-diegetically to the novel, is a form of the Hobbesian trap that has been used to answer the Fermi Paradox by arguing that any two advanced space-faring civilizations will inevitably seek to destroy each other rather than risk being destroyed by the other.

== Avoidance ==
The Hobbesian trap can be avoided by influences that increase the trust between the two parties. In Hobbes' case, the Hobbesian trap would be present in the state of nature where, in the absence of law and law enforcement, the credible threat of violence from others may justify preemptive attacks. For Hobbes, we avoid this problem by naming a ruler who pledges to punish violence with violence. In the Cuban Missile Crisis, for example, Kennedy and Khrushchev realized that they were caught in a Hobbesian trap, which helped them to make concessions that reduced distrust and fear.

== See also ==
- Hobson's choice
- Mexican standoff
- Presumption of guilt
- Prisoner's dilemma
- Realism (international relations)
- Security dilemma
