= The Dark Forest =

2008 science fiction novel by Liu Cixin

- Cover page
- Author: Liu Cixin
- Original title: 黑暗森林
- Translator: Joel Martinsen
- Language: Chinese
- Series: Remembrance of Earth's Past
- Genre: Science fiction, Hard science fiction
- Publication date: 2008
- Publication place: China
- Pages: 400
- ISBN: 978-1784971595
- Preceded by: The Three-Body Problem
- Followed by: Death's End

The Dark Forest
- Chinese: 黑暗森林
- Literal meaning: dark forest
Transcriptions
Standard Mandarin
- Hanyu Pinyin: hēi'àn sēnlín
- IPA: [xéɪ.an sə́n.lǐn]
Yue: Cantonese
- Jyutping: hak^{1} am^{3} sam^{1} lam^{4}
Southern Min
- Hokkien POJ: hek-àm serm-lîm

The Dark Forest (Chinese: 黑暗森林) is a 2008 science fiction novel by Liu Cixin. It is the sequel to the Hugo Award-winning novel The Three-Body Problem in the Remembrance of Earth's Past. The English version, translated by Joel Martinsen, was published in 2015.

The novel revolves around humanity's attempts to construct a defence against an impending invasion fleet from an alien planet. It explores the dark forest hypothesis (so-named after the novel), a possible solution to the Fermi paradox, though similar theories have been described as early as 1983.

== Plot ==
Following the events of The Three Body Problem, humanity unites to defend Earth against the invasion fleet of the alien planet Trisolaris, which will arrive in approximately 400 years. Earth's defence is severely hampered by Trisolaran "sophons", omnipresent but unobservable supercomputers that spy on all Earth activity and interfere with technological development.

However, as sophons cannot surveil human thought, the United Nations appoints four "Wallfacers": individuals tasked with developing defence strategies known only to themselves, and are provided near-unlimited resources to do so. Three of the Wallfacers are renowned for their military, political and scientific expertise, but their secret strategies are ultimately exposed by Trisolaris' agents.

The fourth Wallfacer is the obscure sociologist and ex-astronomer Luo Ji, chosen because he is the target of the only assassination order ever issued by Trisolaris. Luo realizes the Trisolarans uniquely fear him because of his prior encounter with astrophysicist Ye Wenjie, who had encouraged Luo to develop the "dark forest hypothesis", whose central claim is that a civilization which broadcasts its location to the universe will almost certainly invite its destruction by another civilization. Luo tests his hypothesis by broadcasting the location of a star 50 light-years away, then entering hibernation while awaiting to see if the target star is destroyed by an unknown third-party civilization. The Trisolarans, realizing Luo has uncovered a way to destroy Trisolaris, send probes to jam any further cosmic broadcasts.

200 years later, Luo is revived into a utopian society boasting advanced technology. However, the widespread belief in Earth's superiority is shattered when its entire space fleet is annihilated by a single Trisolaran probe. Several ships escape the battle into deep space, but they eventually cannibalize each other for scarce resources, with two ships prevailing: Blue Space and Bronze Age. Luo considers what happened between the fleeing ships to be a manifestation of the ruthless space sociology predicted by his "dark forest" hypothesis.

Amidst the ensuing panic on Earth, Luo resumes his Wallfacer role and successfully develops a system that can circumvent the Trisolaran jamming of cosmic broadcasts. Threatening Trisolaris with mutual assured destruction should he broadcast Trisolaris' (and by proximity, Earth's) location, Luo forces Trisolaris to divert its invasion fleet and to aid human scientific progress.

== Characters ==
- Ye Wenjie (叶文洁) - Astrophysicist who initiated contact between Earth and Trisolaris. Spiritual leader of the Earth Trisolaris Organization (ETO), the network of pro-Trisolaris human agents on Earth.
- Zhang Beihai (章北海) - Political commissar in the PLA Navy and later the Chinese Space Force, responsible for promoting "triumphalism": the conviction that Earth will eventually prevail over Trisolaris. He secretly believes Earth is doomed and escape to another Solar System is the only option.
- Shi Qiang (史强) - Nicknamed Da Shi (大史), the Wallfacer Program's Head of Security who becomes a close ally to Luo Ji. (appears in The Three-Body Problem)
- Ding Yi (丁仪) - Theoretical physicist, the first human to physically make contact with a Trisolaran object. (appears in The Three-Body Problem)
- Zhuang Yan (庄颜) - Graduate of the Central Academy of Fine Arts, she marries Luo Ji.

=== Wallfacers ===
- Frederick Tyler (弗雷德里克·泰勒) - Former US Secretary of Defense, suggests feigning defection to the Trisolaran fleet in order to launch an attack. His plan is exposed by Wallbreaker "von Neumann".
- Manuel Rey Diaz (曼努尔·雷迪亚兹) - Former President of Venezuela, suggests threatening mutual assured destruction by crashing Mercury into the Sun to destroy the Solar System. His plan is exposed by Wallbreaker "Mozi".
- Bill Hines (比尔·希恩斯) - English neuroscientist, physicist and former President of the European Commission, suggests spreading defeatism to promote escapism. His plan is exposed by the Wallbreaker "Aristotle", who is actually his wife Yamasugi Keiko (山杉恵子).
- Luo Ji (罗辑) - Ex-astronomer and sociologist. He forces a truce by threatening to broadcast Trisolaris' position which will invite its destruction by a third party.

== Adaptations ==
- Waterdrop, referring to the Trisolaran droplet probe, is a 14-minute tribute film produced by Wang Ren, who was then a graduate student studying Architecture in Columbia University. The author Liu Cixin commented, "This is the kind of film I have in mind. If the feeling of such an atmosphere can be delivered in a Three Body Problem film, I would rest in peace after I die."
- MC Three Body - The Dark Forest is an animation series produced by a group of Chinese fans. Initially a machinima series produced using the video game Minecraft, they later switched to using professional animation software. The series was released online at the beginning of 2018.
- A Chinese animated series based on The Dark Forest aired from December 10, 2022 to March 25, 2023.
- A three-part documentary series entitled Rendezvous with the Future which explores the science behind Liu Cixin's science fiction was produced by BBC Studios and released by Bilibili in China in November 2022. The second episode covers many ideas featured in The Dark Forest such as the space elevator and artificial hibernation. An international version of the series has not yet been released.
- Part of the novel was adapted in the first season of the 2024 Netflix series 3 Body Problem.

== See also ==
- Dark forest hypothesis
- Drake equation
- Fermi paradox
- The Headquarters of the United Nations and the UN meditation room, which play a major role in the plot
- Hobbesian trap
- Search for extraterrestrial intelligence
