= Ball Lightning (novel) =

2004 novel by Liu Cixin

- 2005 Chinese edition
- Author: Liu Cixin
- Original title: 球状闪电; Qiúzhuàng Shǎndiàn
- Translator: Joel Martinsen
- Language: Chinese
- Genre: Hard science fiction
- Publication date: 2004
- Publication place: China
- English publication date: 2018
- Pages: 352
- ISBN: 978-0765394071

Ball Lightning (Chinese: 球状闪电) is a hard science fiction novel by Chinese author Liu Cixin, also considered a precursor to The Three-Body Problem. The original Chinese language version was published in 2004. In 2018 the English language version, translated by Joel Martinsen, was published in the US by Tor Books.

== Plot ==
The novel is set in late 20th and early 21st century China. As a teenager, Chen witnesses his parents be killed by ball lightning. Traumatized but intrigued, he dedicates his life to studying this phenomenon. After training as an atmospheric physicist, he joins a military technology research team alongside PLA major Lin Yun, who aims to develop a ball lightning weapon.

With the help of theoretical physicist Ding Yi, they discover that ball lightning is not a manifestation of lightning. Rather, it is the excited state of a novel macroscopic-sized fundamental particle termed "macro-electron" which, in its ground state, is ubiquitous but near-invisible. After excitation by a high energy source such as a lightning strike, a macro-electron may then release its energy with destructive results, but only against materials that are specific to each macro-electron.

The team successfully captures macro-electrons and creates a weapon that can destroy targeted materials: wood, biological tissue or even microprocessors. The weapon is first deployed against eco-terrorists at a nuclear power plant; excited anti-personnel macro-electrons kill the terrorists and their child hostages, while leaving the plant undamaged. Disillusioned by the lethal application of his work, Chen resigns and returns to civilian research.

After Chen's departure, war erupts between China and its enemies (Note: The novel implies, but does not explicitly state, that China's enemy is the United States.). An attempted ball lightning strike is neutralised by the enemy's countermeasures. Incentivized to develop novel weapons, the ball lightning team also discovers and captures "macro-atomic nuclei", creating the possibility of "macro-fusion," which could release huge amounts of material-selective destructive energy. Fearing the consequences of such technology, the Chinese military terminates macro-fusion research, but Lin Yun defies orders and initiates a test at the cost of her life. The resulting reaction destroys microprocessors across a vast swathe of China, crippling its defence capability. However, China's enemies recognize the potential for macro-fusion to be used for mutual assured destruction, so they sue for peace.

Ding Yi explains to Chen that those "killed" by macro-electrons and macro-fusion instead exist in a quantum state that can occasionally influence the world paranormally. In this manner, an apparition of Lin Yun, who now exists as a quantum entity, converses with her father before vanishing. She later delivers an invisible rose to Chen. A photograph in Ding Yi's apartment displays Lin Yun's new existence among the "dead" child hostages and the animals sacrificed during ball lightning testing.

An American researcher visits Chen, and describes how they had observed several trials where macro-electrons behaved as though observers were present, despite strict no-observer experimental conditions. They hypothesize the existence of extraterrestrial observers.

== Characters ==
Dr Chen (陈博士)
The first-person narrator, whose given name is never mentioned in the novel. He is an atmospheric scientist and physicist who investigates ball lightning. He reluctantly participates in the development of ball lightning weapons, in collaboration with Lin Yun and Ding Yi.

Lin Yun (林云)
Major in the People's Liberation Army, military researcher, graduate of the National University of Defense Technology, and daughter of the powerful General Lin Feng. Her zeal for weapons development and consequentialist outlook often places her at odds with her comrades.

She also appears in Liu's short story Full Spectrum Barrage Jamming, and is mentioned by Ding Yi in Remembrance of Earth's Past.

Ding Yi (丁仪)
China's foremost theoretical physicist. He proposes the correct theoretical description of ball lightning, which is subsequently validated by the military research group's experiments.

He also plays a major role in Liu's Remembrance of Earth's Past.

Zhang Bin (张彬)
Chen's university professor and research mentor. Husband of Zheng Min. Zhang and Zheng had once investigated ball lightning until it "killed" the latter, after which Zhang abandons ball lightning research.

Zheng Min
Physicist and wife of Zhang Bin. Prior to the events of the novel, she was "killed" by ball lightning, but she continues to exist as a quantum entity who occasionally leaves clues about macro-atoms for the protagonists.

== Adaptation ==
There were plans to release a film based on the book.

A TV series directed by Dai Mo was filmed in 2022 and is planned to be released on the iQIYI platform.

== Reception to the book ==
Ball Lightning has been regarded as the book with the most complete story line and closest to real life in Liu's science fiction universe.

Critics have called the book, "an important—and timely—meditation on science, weapons development, and the ways in which people confront trauma."

== Creation background ==
One summer night in 1981, Liu Cixin first saw "ball lightning" during a thunderstorm at the south end of Zhonghua Road in Handan City. This natural phenomenon not only shocked his visual senses but also ignited his enthusiasm for exploring the unknown world, which became the inspiration for the book Ball Lightning.

Due to a misdiagnosis, the author thought he was suffering from liver cancer at the time he was writing the novel, but instead of making a statement, he did his best to finish writing the novel before he believed he was going to die. As such, the novel is a personal outpouring and reflection of Liu's feelings.

== See also ==
- Ball lightning
