= Xu Li (computer scientist) =

Chinese computer scientist

- Education: Chinese University of Hong Kong; Shanghai Jiao Tong University
- Awards: Best Paper Award Non-Photorealistic Rendering and Animation (NPAR) 2012; Best Reviewer Award Asian Conference on Computer Vision ACCV 2012; International Conference on Computer Vision (ICCV) 2015
- Website: SenseTime

Xu Li is a Chinese computer scientist and co-founder and current CEO of SenseTime, an artificial intelligence (AI) company. Xu has led SenseTime since the company's incorporation and helped it independently develop its proprietary deep learning platform.

== Education and research ==
Xu obtained both his bachelor's and master's degrees in computer science from Shanghai Jiao Tong University. He received his doctorate in computer science from the Chinese University of Hong Kong.

Xu has published more than 50 papers at international conferences and in journals in the field of computer vision and won the Best Paper Award at the international conference on Non-Photorealistic Rendering and Animation (NPAR) 2012 and the Best Reviewer Award at the international conferences Asian Conference on Computer Vision ACCV 2012 and International Conference on Computer Vision (ICCV) 2015. He has three algorithms that have been included into the visual open-source platform OpenCV, and his "L_{0} Smoothing" algorithm garnered the most citations in research papers over a span of five years (2011–2015) within the ACM Transactions on Graphics (TOG), a scientific journal that Thomson Reuters InCites has placed first among software engineering journals.

== Career ==
Previously, Xu worked at Lenovo Corporate Research & Development. He was also a visiting researcher at Motorola China R&D Institute, Omron Research Institute, and Microsoft Research.

== Selected publications ==
- Jimmy Ren, Xiaohao Chen, Jianbo Liu, Wenxiu Sun, Li Xu, Jiahao Pang, Qiong Yan, Yu-wing Tai, "Accurate Single Stage Detector Using Recurrent Rolling Convolution", (CVPR), 2017.
- Jimmy SJ. Ren, Yongtao Hu, Yu-Wing Tai, Chuan Wang, Li Xu, Wenxiu Sun, Qiong Yan, "Look, Listen and Learn – A Multimodal LSTM for Speaker Identification", The 30th AAAI Conference on Artificial Intelligence (AAAI), 2016
- Jimmy SJ. Ren, Li Xu, Qiong Yan, Wenxiu Sun, "Shepard Convolutional Neural Networks" Advances in Neural Information Processing Systems (NIPS), 2015.
- Xiaoyong Shen, Chao Zhou, Li Xu, Jiaya Jia, "Mutual-Structure for Joint Filtering" International Conference on Computer Vision (ICCV), (oral presentation), 2015.
- Jianping Shi, Qiong Yan, Li Xu, Jiaya Jia, "Hierarchical Image Saliency Detection on Extended CSSD" IEEE Transactions on Pattern Analysis and Machine Intelligence (TPAMI), 2015.
- Jianping Shi, Xin Tao, Li Xu, Jiaya Jia, "Break Ames Room Illusion: Depth from General Single Images" ACM Transactions on Graphics (TOG), (Proc. ACM SIGGRAPH ASIA2015).
- Yongtao Hu, Jimmy SJ. Ren, Jingwen Dai, Chang Yuan, Li Xu, Wenping Wang, "Deep Multimodal Speaker Naming" ACM International Conference on Multimedia (MM), 2015.
- Li Xu, Jimmy SJ. Ren, Qiong Yan, Renjie Liao, Jiaya Jia "Deep Edge-Aware Filters" International Conference on Machine Learning (ICML), 2015.
- Jianping Shi, Li Xu, Jiaya Jia "Just Noticeable Defocus Blur Detection and Estimation" IEEE Conference on Computer Vision and Pattern Recognition (CVPR), 2015.
- Ziyang Ma, Renjie Liao, Xin Tao, Li Xu, Jiaya Jia, Enhua Wu "Handling Motion Blur in Multi-Frame Super-Resolution" IEEE Conference on Computer Vision and Pattern Recognition (CVPR), 2015.
- Xiaoyong Shen*, Qiong Yan, Li Xu, Lizhuang Ma, Jiaya Jia"Multispectral Joint Image Restoration via Optimizing a Scale Map" IEEE Transactions on Pattern Analysis and Machine Intelligence (TPAMI), 2015.
- Jimmy SJ. Ren, Li Xu, "On Vectorization of Deep Convolutional Neural Networks for Vision Tasks" AAAI Conference on Artificial Intelligence (AAAI), 2015.

== Awards and honors ==
Xu was ranked 7th in Fortune magazine's 2018 edition of its 40 Under 40. He was also named "China's Outstanding AI Industry Leader" by The Economic Observer, received the "Innovative Business Leader" Award under NetEase's "Future Technology Talent Awards", and was honored as Sina's "2017 Top Ten Economic Figures". In 2018, Xu was named EY's "Entrepreneur of the Year China" in the Technology category.
