= The Three-Body Problem (novel) =

2008 science fiction novel by Liu Cixin

- Author: Liu Cixin
- Original title: 三体
- Translator: Ken Liu
- Language: Chinese
- Series: Remembrance of Earth's Past
- Genre: Hard science fiction
- Publisher: Chongqing Press
- Publication date: 2008
- Publication place: China
- English publication date: 2014 by: UK: Head of Zeus; US: Tor Books
- Pages: 390
- Awards: Hugo Award for Best Novel (2015); Kurd Laßwitz Award for Best Foreign Work (2017)
- ISBN: 978-7-536-69293-0
- Followed by: The Dark Forest

The Three-Body Problem
- Simplified Chinese: 三体
- Traditional Chinese: 三體
- Literal meaning: "Three Body"
Transcriptions
Standard Mandarin
- Hanyu Pinyin: Sān Tǐ
- Bopomofo: ㄙㄢ ㄊㄧˇ
- Wade–Giles: San^{1} t'i^{3}
- Yale Romanization: Sān Tǐ
- IPA: [sán tʰì]
Wu
- Suzhounese: Se^{1} thi^{3}
Yue: Cantonese
- Yale Romanization: Sāam tái
- Jyutping: Saam1 tai2
- IPA: [sam˥ tʰɐj˧˥]
Southern Min
- Tâi-lô: Sam thé

The Three-Body Problem (Chinese: 三体; pinyin: Sān tǐ; lit. 'three body') is a 2008 novel by the Chinese hard science fiction author Liu Cixin. It is the first novel in the Remembrance of Earth's Past trilogy. The series portrays a fictional past, present, and future wherein Earth encounters an alien civilization from a nearby system of three Sun-like stars orbiting one another, a representative example of the three-body problem in orbital mechanics.

The story was originally serialized in Science Fiction World in 2006 before it was published as a standalone book in 2008. In 2006, it received the Galaxy Award for Chinese science fiction. In 2012, it was described as one of China's most successful full-length novels of the past two decades. The English translation by Ken Liu was published by Tor Books in 2014. That translation was the first novel by an Asian writer to win a Hugo Award for Best Novel; it was also nominated for the Nebula Award for Best Novel.

The book has been adapted into other media. In 2015, a Chinese film adaptation of the same name was in production, but it was never released. A Chinese TV series, Three-Body, was released in early 2023 to critical success locally. An English-language Netflix series adaptation, 3 Body Problem, was released in March 2024.

== Background ==
Liu Cixin was born in Beijing in June 1963. Before beginning his career as an author, he was a senior engineer working at a power plant in Shanxi province. In 1989, he wrote Supernova Era and China 2185, but neither book was published at that time. His first published short story, "Whale Song", was published in Science Fiction World in June 1999. The same year, his novel With Her Eyes won the Galaxy Award. In 2000, he wrote The Wandering Earth, which also received the Galaxy Award and was adapted into a film in 2019. When the short story "Mountain" appeared in January 2006, many readers wrote that they hoped Liu would write a novel. He decided to concentrate on novel-length texts rather than short stories. Outside of Remembrance of Earth's Past, Liu's novels include Supernova Era and Ball Lightning. When not otherwise busy, Liu wrote 3,000–5,000 words a day; each of his books reportedly took about one year to complete.

== Plot ==
During China's Cultural Revolution, astrophysicist Ye Wenjie witnesses her father beaten to death during a struggle session. A political outcast, Ye is initially sentenced to a labor camp but is then recruited to "Red Coast," a secret military initiative attempting to search for and communicate with extraterrestrial life.

At Red Coast, Ye discovers a method to amplify radio frequency transmissions using the Sun, with which she secretly broadcasts a message. Eight years later, she receives a reply from the alien planet Trisolaris, which warns her not to make any further communications to avoid the Trisolarans learning the location of Earth and subsequently invading. Disillusioned by humanity's inability to live harmoniously with itself and nature, Ye invites the Trisolarans to Earth to settle its problems.

After China's reforms, Ye encounters Mike Evans, heir to the world's largest oil company but also a radical environmentalist who shares Ye's ideals and disappointment in humanity. Ye discloses Trisolaris' existence to Evans, who founds and finances the secret Earth-Trisolaris Organization (ETO) as a militant fifth column for Trisolaris, with Ye as the ETO's leader.

Through Trisolaris-ETO communications, Trisolaris is revealed to be a planet orbiting the ternary star system of Alpha Centauri. (Note: In reality, Alpha Centauri A and B form a relatively stable binary star system, while Proxima Centauri roughly orbits A and B.) Because of the three-body problem, the three stars' movements (and Trisolaris' position relative to them) are chaotic and unpredictable. As a result, Trisolaris experiences great climate extremes, alternating between temperate "Stable Eras" during which civilization thrives, and "Chaotic Eras" of climate catastrophes. The worst such catastrophes are civilization-ending. Hundreds of Trisolaran civilizations have risen and fallen, each attempting but failing to develop an accurate calendar that can predict and help prepare for Chaotic Eras.

Upon reception of Ye's broadcasts, the current and technologically advanced Trisolaran civilization identifies Earth as a colonization target, which will permit the Trisolaran civilization to escape their inhospitable and ultimately-doomed home planet. It dispatches an invasion force on a 450-year journey to Earth.

However, the Trisolaran leadership is concerned that Earth's accelerating technological developments will outmatch the invasion force by the time of its arrival. Therefore, Trisolaris develops "sophons" (minuscule supercomputers embedded in single protons) in order to arrest Earth's technological development by interfering with its scientific experiments.

By the late-2000s/early-2010s, the sophon-induced apparent breakdown of science on Earth has prompted the suicides of prominent scientists. This alarms Earth's governments, who form an international task force to investigate, recruiting nanotechnologist Wang Miao and detective Shi Qiang. As part of his investigation, Wang plays the virtual reality video game Three Body, which is a simulation of Trisolaris created by the ETO to identify potential recruits and to garner sympathy for the Trisolaran plight.

Wang's successes in Three Body result in his induction into the ETO, where Ye reveals to Wang the full extent of the conspiracy. Wang also witnesses the schism between the "Adventist" faction of the ETO, which views humanity as irredeemable and promotes its complete destruction by Trisolaris, and the "Redemptionist" faction, which aims to save the Trisolaran civilization by developing a solution to the three-body problem and producing an accurate calendar.

Tipped-off by Wang, Shi and the People's Liberation Army raid the meeting, arresting Ye. An international military force then seizes the converted oil tanker housing ETO's communications with Trisolaris. From these actions, Earth's governments directly learn of Trisolaris' existence and the approaching invasion force. Wang and his colleagues resolve to fight in Humanity's defense.

== English translation ==
In 2012, Chinese-American science-fiction author Ken Liu and translator Joel Martinsen were commissioned by the China Educational Publications Import and Export Corporation (CEPIEC) to produce an English translation of The Three-Body Problem, with Liu translating the first and last volumes, and Martinsen translating the second. In 2013, it was announced that the series would be published by Tor in the United States and by Head of Zeus in the United Kingdom.

Liu and Martinsen's translations contain footnotes explaining references to Chinese history that may be unfamiliar to international audiences. There are also some changes in the order of the chapters for the first volume. In the translated version, chapters which take place during the Cultural Revolution appear at the beginning of the novel rather than in the middle, as they were serialized in 2006 and appeared in the 2008 novel. According to the author, these chapters were originally intended as the opening, but were moved by his publishers to avoid attracting the attention of government censors.

== Characters ==
=== Ye family ===
Ye Zhetai (叶哲泰)
Physicist and professor at Tsinghua University. He is killed at a struggle session during the Cultural Revolution.
Shao Lin (绍琳)
Physicist and wife of Ye Zhetai. She denounces her husband in an act of self-preservation.
Ye Wenjie (叶文洁)
Astrophysicist and daughter of Ye Zhetai and Shao Lin. She is the first person to establish contact with Trisolaris while working at Red Coast. She marries Yang Weining with whom she has a daughter, Yang Dong. She later becomes the spiritual leader of the Earth-Trisolaris Organization (ETO).
Ye Wenxue (叶文雪)
Ye Wenjie's younger sister, a Tsinghua High School student and a zealous Red Guard. She is killed during factional violence at some point after the collapse of their family.

=== Red Coast Base ===
Lei Zhicheng (雷志成)
Political commissar at Red Coast Base. He recruits Ye Wenjie and oversees her work. He is murdered by Ye Wenjie after he discovers her secret communications with Trisolaris.
Yang Weining (杨卫宁)
Chief engineer at Red Coast Base, once a student of Ye Zhetai, later Ye Wenjie's husband and murdered by her alongside Lei Zhicheng.

=== Present-day ===
Wang Miao (汪淼)
Nanomaterials researcher and academician from the Chinese Academy of Sciences. He is tasked with investigating the ETO as well as the recent spate of suicides among well-known scientists. Wang Miao becomes immersed in the virtual reality game Three Body, through which he learns about Trisolaris.
Yang Dong (杨冬)
String theorist and daughter of Ye Wenjie and Yang Weining. She commits suicide shortly before the present day events.
Ding Yi (丁仪)
Theoretical physicist and Yang Dong's partner. He provides key insights to Wang Miao during his investigations. He was previously featured in Ball Lightning, another of Liu's works.
Shi Qiang (史强)
Police detective and counter-terrorism specialist, nicknamed "Da Shi" (大史; "Big Shi"). He has a crude demeanor but is highly dependable and often demonstrates keen insight. He assists Wang Miao in exposing the ETO.
Chang Weisi (常伟思)
Major-general of the People's Liberation Army who leads China's response to the ETO.
Shen Yufei (申玉菲)
Chinese-Japanese physicist. A leader of the "Redemptionist" faction of the ETO, she aims to develop a solution to the three-body problem that will save the Trisolaran civilization. She is murdered by her factional rival Pan Han.
Wei Cheng (魏成)
Math prodigy, recluse, and Shen Yufei's husband. With Shen's support, he develops a possible solution to the three-body problem.
Pan Han (潘寒)
Biologist, acquaintance of Shen Yufei and Wei Cheng. A leader of the "Adventist" faction of the ETO, he murders Shen Yufei to prevent the solving of the three-body problem, which will remove Trisolaris' incentive to invade Earth.
Sha Ruishan (沙瑞山)
Astronomer, one of Ye Wenjie's students.
Mike Evans (麦克·伊文斯)
Radical environmentalist who supports "pan-species communism", also son of an oil magnate. After meeting Ye Wenjie, he founds the ETO and provides its main source of funding. He leads the "Adventist" faction of the ETO, which views humanity as irredeemable and promotes its complete destruction by Trisolaris.
Colonel Stanton (斯坦顿)
Officer of the U.S. Marine Corps and commander of Operation Guzheng, which captures the ETO's communications with Trisolaris.

== Inspiration ==
In Liu's early childhood, when he was three years old his family moved from the Beijing Coal Design Institute to Yangquan in Shanxi, due to his father changing jobs. He also spent a part of his childhood in the countryside around the ancestral hometown of Luoshan, Henan. On 25 April 1970, Dong Fang Hong 1—China's first satellite—was launched. Liu remembered the launch as a pivotal event in his life, recalling a deep sense of longing on witnessing it.

Several years later, Liu found a box of books under his bed in Yangquan, which included an anthology of Tolstoy, Moby-Dick, Journey to the Center of the Earth, and Silent Spring. Upon beginning to read Journey to the Center of the Earth, his father told him: "It's called science fiction, it's a creative writing based on science". This was his first encounter with the genre, and he later remarked: "My persistence stems from the words of my father." At that time, such books could only be safely read privately by individuals: "I felt like being alone on an island, it is a very lonely state".

== Analysis ==
While the novel features several characters, its primary focus is on geopolitics, both in Mao's China and present-day civilization.

The opening scenes of the initial draft of the novel focus on Ye Wenjie's experiences in the People's Liberation Army and depict the brutality, anti-intellectualism, and environmental destruction of Mao Zedong's government. Liu's publisher encouraged him to move these scenes deeper into the book to avoid attracting criticism by Chinese government censors; later, for the English translation and for many of the film adaptations, the scenes were restored. Peter Suderman of Reason magazine interpreted the inability of the trisolarans to communicate privately, and the ubiquity of the sophons, as an allegory for the Chinese surveillance state. He likened the mob that beats scientists to death during the "struggle sessions" to a warning about mob mentality.

Despite the brutality Liu depicts, ultimately Ye Wenjie is also a radical and a villain for her nihilistic attitude about humanity. Jiayang Fan's profile in The New Yorker depicted Liu as less critical of the authoritarian Chinese government than she expected. When she pushed Liu about his political views, Liu was sympathetic toward many of China's controversial authoritarian policies, demonstrating a utilitarian belief in the greater good. Three-Body Problem similarly is critical of overly individualistic ideology, often pointing out that the only way for humanity to defeat the Trisolaran threat is to set its short-term goals aside.

Ross Douthat wrote in The New York Times about the book's criticisms of futilist thinking, nihilism, and "angst".

Reverence and fear of the universe is one of the main themes of Liu's writing; according to him, humans will stand in awe of the scale and depth of the universe. His novels also focus on curiosity about the unknown. Liu says he cannot help thinking about the future world and lifestyle of human beings, and he tries to invoke readers' curiosity with his books. He also believes that humans should be treated as an entirety. Liu tried to answer the existential dilemma of "where should mankind go from here" through various efforts.

A hard science fiction novel, the book explores the positive and negative implications of technological progress, particularly through Wang Miao's nanomaterials research. While Wang has positive intentions for the applications of his nanotechnology, Liu presents the destructive military application of the technology as almost inevitable.

== Reception ==
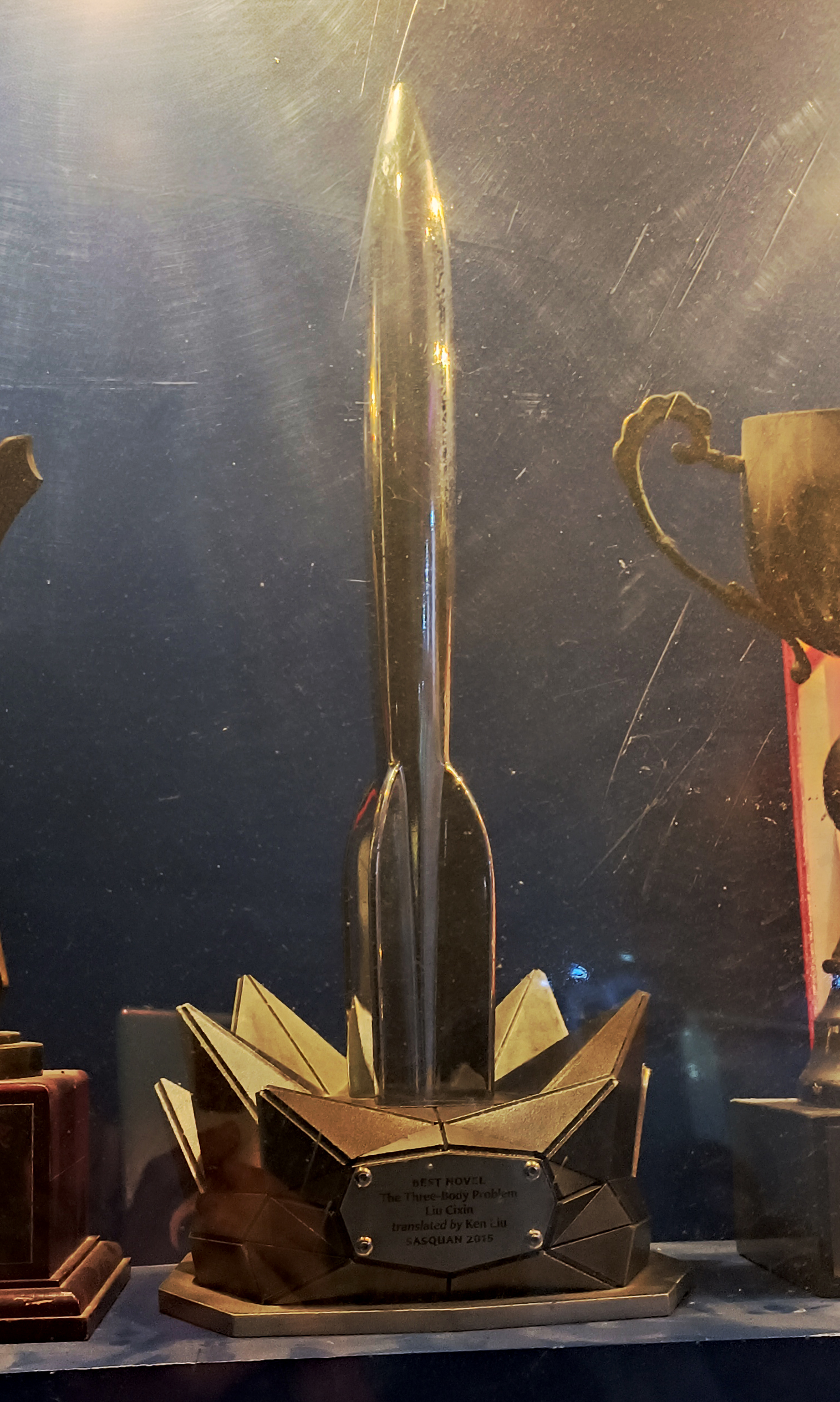
The Hugo Award trophy won by Liu

In December 2019, The New York Times cited The Three-Body Problem as having helped to popularize Chinese science fiction internationally, crediting the quality of Ken Liu's English translation, as well as endorsements of the book by George R. R. Martin, Facebook founder Mark Zuckerberg, and former U.S. president Barack Obama. George R. R. Martin wrote a blog post about the novel, personally expressing its worthiness of the Hugo Award. Obama said the book had "immense" scope, and that it was "fun to read, partly because my day-to-day problems with United States Congress seem fairly petty".

Kirkus Reviews wrote that "in concept and development, it resembles top-notch Arthur C. Clarke or Larry Niven but with a perspective—plots, mysteries, conspiracies, murders, revelations and all—embedded in a culture and politic dramatically unfamiliar to most readers in the West, conveniently illuminated with footnotes courtesy of translator Liu." Joshua Rothman of The New Yorker also called Liu Cixin "China's Arthur C. Clarke", and similarly observed that in "American science fiction ... humanity's imagined future often looks a lot like America's past. For an American reader, one of the pleasures of reading Liu is that his stories draw on entirely different resources", citing his use of themes relating to Chinese history and politics.

Matthew A. Morrison wrote that the novel could "evoke a response all but unique to the genre: an awe at nature and the universe [which] SF readers call a 'sense of wonder'".

In 2024, American streaming service Netflix released a television adaptation of the series.

== Awards and nominations ==
Awards	
2006 Yinhe (Galaxy Award)	Won
2010 Chinese Fantasy Star Award for Best Novelette	Won
2014 Nebula Award for Best Novel	Nominated
2015 Hugo Award for Best Novel	Won
2015 John W. Campbell Memorial Award	Nominated
2015 Locus Award for Best SF Novel	Nominated
2015 Prometheus Award	Nominated
2015 John W. Campbell Memorial Award	Nominated
2017 Kurd-Laßwitz-Preis for Best Foreign SF work	Won
2017 Premio Ignotus for Foreign Novel	Won
2017 Grand Prix de l'Imaginaire for Foreign Novel	Nominated
2018 Premio Italia Award for Best International Novel	Won
2018 Arthur C. Clarke Award for Imagination in Service to Society	Won
2019 Booklog Award for Best Translated Novel	Won
2020 Seiun Award for Best Translated Novel	Won

== Adaptations ==
=== Film ===
- The Three-Body Problem is a postponed Chinese science fiction 3D film directed by Fanfan Zhang and starring Feng Shaofeng and Zhang Jingchu. Filming began, but it was never completed or released.

=== Comics ===
- A serialized digital comic adaptation has been published by Tencent Comics since 2019.

=== Audio ===
- The audiobook adaptation of the Three Body Problem was produced by Macmillan in 2014 and narrated by Luke Daniels. It was released again in 2023 and narrated by Rosalind Chao, who starred in Netflix's TV adaptation.
- The chapters of the Three Body Problem were featured in the serialized podcast Stories From Among the Stars produced by Tor Books and Macmillan in July 2021.
- All three books of Remembrance of Earth's Past trilogy have been adapted into a 100-episode Mandarin radio drama on Ximalaya.

=== Animation ===
- The Three-Body Problem in Minecraft is a fan-made (later officially-sanctioned) animated adaptation of the series, directed by Shenyou (Zhenyi Li). It was initially animated entirely as an amateur Minecraft machinima, with a low budget and production quality for its first season in 2014. According to Xu Yao, the CEO of The Three-Body Universe, Shenyou chose this medium out of the minimal budget, as Minecraft allows its players to design environments with ease and does not require animation. The machinima format, after the first season's first few episodes, was later converted into Minecraft-styled computer animation due to the show's success.
- Computer-animated 15-episode miniseries starring Zhen Zhao.

=== Television ===
- A Chinese TV adaptation produced by Tencent Video premiered on 16 January 2023. In 2024, NBC aired the Chinese series on Peacock, its streaming service, premiering on 10 February.
- An American TV series based on the book was released by Netflix on 21 March 2024, with David Benioff, D.B. Weiss, and Alexander Woo writing and executive producing.
- An award-winning documentary series titled Rendezvous with the Future, which explores the science behind Liu Cixin's science fiction, was produced by BBC Studios and released by Bilibili in China. The first episode covers many ideas featured in The Three-Body Problem such as messaging extraterrestrial civilisations and the possibility of a gravitational wave transmitter.
