= Dark forest hypothesis =

Hypothesis of hidden life in space

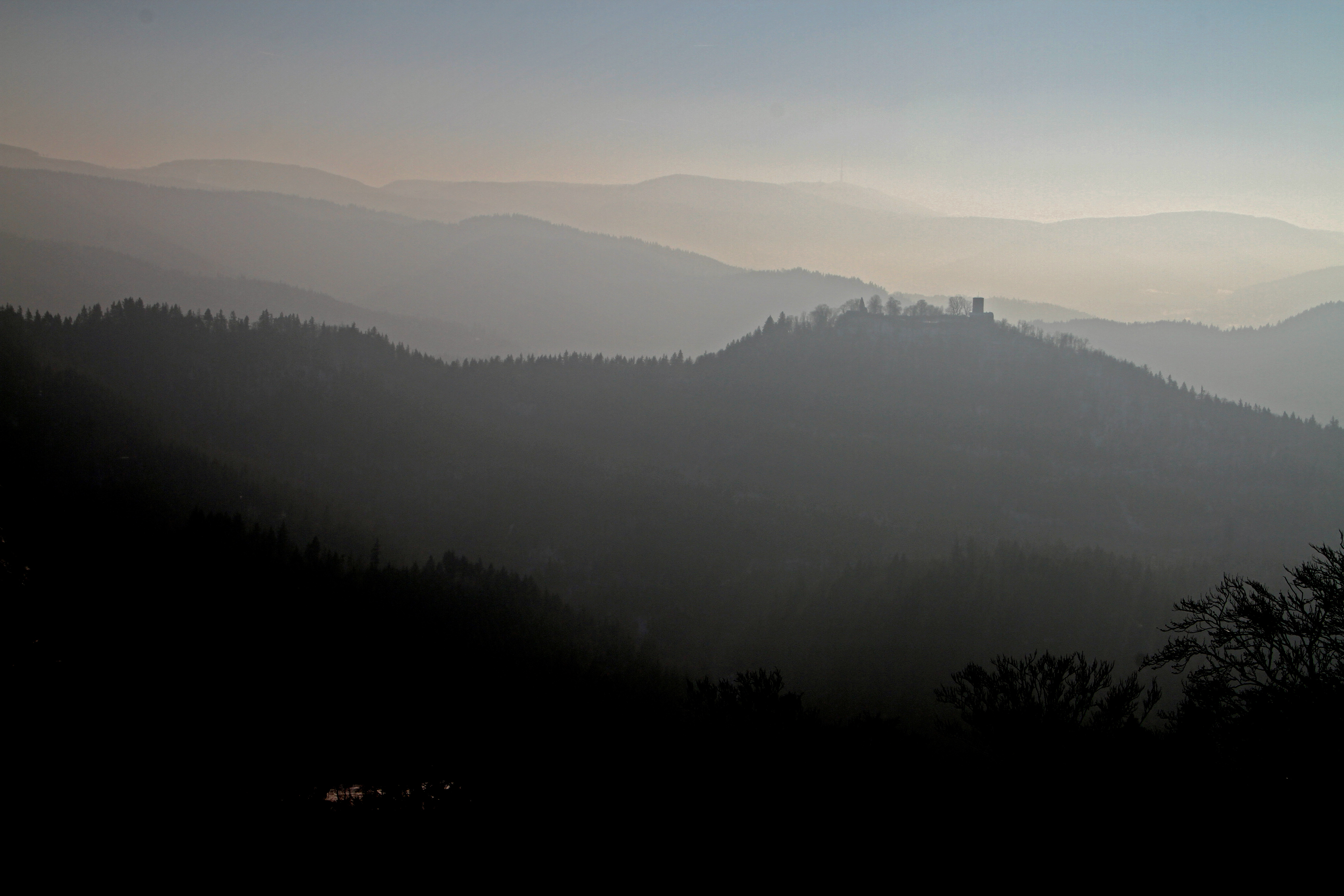
Black Forest pictured in darkness, the concept from which the novel took its name

The dark forest hypothesis is the idea that extraterrestrial civilizations may exist in abundance across the universe, but remain silent and hidden out of fear that revealing themselves would lead to destruction by a more technologically advanced and hostile civilization. It is one of several proposed explanations of the Fermi paradox, which contrasts the apparently high probability of extraterrestrial life with the lack of evidence for it. The hypothesis derives its name from Liu Cixin's 2008 novel The Dark Forest although similar concepts predate the work.

== Relation to the Fermi paradox ==
There is currently no known reliable or reproducible evidence that extraterrestrial life forms have visited or attempted to contact Earth. Despite systematic searches, no transmission and no firm evidence of intelligent extraterrestrial life has been detected. This runs counter to the general observations that:

- The universe is filled with a very large number of planets, some of which might possess conditions hospitable for life;
- Terrestrial life is observed to expand until it fills all niches suited to it.

These contradictory facts form the basis for the Fermi paradox.

== Concept ==
The "dark forest" hypothesis presumes that any space-faring civilization would view any other intelligent life such as theirs as an inevitable threat and thus destroy any nascent life that makes itself known. As a result, the electromagnetic radiation surveys would not find evidence of intelligent alien life.

A similar hypothesis, under the name "deadly probes", was described by astronomer and author David Brin in his 1983 summary of the arguments for and against the Fermi paradox.

The name of the hypothesis derives from Liu Cixin's 2008 novel The Dark Forest, as in a "dark forest" filled with "armed hunter(s) stalking through the trees like ghosts". According to the dark forest hypothesis, since the intentions of any newly contacted civilisation can never be known with certainty, then if one is encountered, it is best to make a preemptive strike, in order to avoid the potential extinction of one's own species. The novel provides a detailed investigation of Liu's concerns about alien contact.

== Relationship to other proposed Fermi paradox solutions ==
The Berserker hypothesis, also known as the deadly probes scenario, proposes self-reproducing machines that would seek to destroy organic life. The name derives from short stories by Fred Saberhagen written in the 1960s, but the concept was introduced by John von Neumann in 1948 as part of his analysis of self-replicating machines. While the Berserker hypothesis is also about horrible outcomes from other civilizations, unlike the Dark Forest hypothesis, the probes or their actions would seem to be detectable.

== Game theory ==
The dark forest hypothesis is a special case of the "sequential and incomplete information game" in game theory.

In game theory, a "sequential and incomplete information game" is one in which players make decisions in sequence, with each player having limited knowledge about the others' choices and strategies. In the case of this particular game, the only win condition is continued survival. An additional constraint in the special case of the "dark forest" is the scarcity of vital resources. The "dark forest" can be considered an extensive-form game with each "player" possessing the following possible actions: destroy another civilization known to the player; broadcast and alert other civilizations of one's existence; or do nothing.

== Science fiction versions ==
In addition to Fred Saberhagen's Berserker novels, variations of these ideas have been used in other science fiction stories. In 1987, science fiction author Greg Bear explored this concept that he called a "vicious jungle" in his novel The Forge of God. In The Forge of God, humanity is likened to a baby crying in a hostile forest: "There once was an infant lost in the woods, crying its heart out, wondering why no one answered, drawing down the wolves." One of the characters explains, "We've been sitting in our tree chirping like foolish birds for over a century now, wondering why no other birds answered. The galactic skies are full of hawks, that's why. Planetisms that don't know enough to keep quiet, get eaten."

The term "dark forest" was coined for the idea in 2008 by science fiction author Liu Cixin in his novel The Dark Forest. In Liu Cixin's novel, the dark forest hypothesis is introduced by the character Luo Ji, while discussing with Ye Wenjie. She introduces three key axioms to a new field she describes as "cosmic sociology":

1. "Suppose a vast number of civilizations distributed throughout the universe, on the order of the number of observable stars. Lots and lots of them. Those civilizations make up the body of a cosmic society. Cosmic sociology is the study of the nature of this super-society."
2. Suppose that survival is the primary need of a civilization.
3. Suppose that civilizations continuously expand over time, but the total matter in the universe remains constant.

The only logical conclusion from the acceptance of these axioms as well as two other considerations, "chain of suspicion" and "technological explosion", according to the character Ye was talking to, is that any civilization that revealed itself will be considered as an imminent existential threat by at least some of the other civilizations, among which some will then proceed to destroy the civilization that makes itself known.

In the third book of the trilogy, the perspective of the hunters in The Dark Forest is further illustrated through an alien character called Singer, who thinks that intelligent life that does not fear the dark forest would "expand and attack without fear". In other words, dark-forest-fearing civilizations are benign, civilizations that would reveal themselves are evil, and hunters are enforcers and protectors.
