= The Three-Body Problem (film) =

Unfinished Chinese sci-fi film (c. 2015)

- Poster
- Traditional Chinese: 三體
- Simplified Chinese: 三体
- Literal meaning: three bodies
- Hanyu Pinyin: sān tǐ
- Directed by: Zhang Fanfan
- Based on: The Three-Body Problem by Liu Cixin
- Produced by: Liu Cixin
- Starring: Feng Shaofeng; Zhang Jingchu
- Production companies: Beijing Baixingshe Media Development; Youzu Pictures
- Distributed by: Youzu Pictures; Beijing Baixingshe Media Development
- Country: China
- Languages: English; Mandarin
- Budget: CN¥200 million

The Three-Body Problem (Chinese: 三体) is an unreleased Chinese science fiction 3D film, adapted from the book of the same name by Liu Cixin, directed by Zhang Fanfan, and starring Feng Shaofeng and Zhang Jingchu.

In March 2018, Amazon was rumored to be negotiating for the rights to the project. However, Youzu Pictures released a statement in response stating that it was the "sole owner of the rights for film and TV series adaptations." Although it "was originally scheduled to be released in 2017", the project "was postponed indefinitely due to the company's internal shuffling and the rumored 'bad quality' of the film's first cut."

== Production ==
The film had a budget of CN¥200 million (US$30 million). Filming began in March 2015 in Heilongjiang and ended in July 2015. The production company was Youzu Film, established in 2014 by Lin Qi.
