= The Wandering Earth (novella) =

Novella by Cixin Liu

The Wandering Earth is a science fiction novella by Chinese writer Cixin Liu. The novella focuses on humanity's efforts to move the Earth in order to avoid a supernova. It was first published in 2000 by Beijing Guomi and won the 2000 China Galaxy Science Fiction Award of the Year.

The novella was first published in English by Head of Zeus in 2017, as an eponymous collection of Liu's science fiction short stories. It was also adapted into a 2019 film of the same name and its prequel, and a 2021 graphic novel.

== Plot ==
Four centuries prior to the events of the story, astrophysicists discover that a rapid acceleration in the conversion of hydrogen to helium will cause the Sun to go supernova, destroying the Earth and the Solar System. In response, humanity establishes a global government known as the Coalition, which embarks on an ambitious project to move the Earth to the Proxima Centauri planetary system, which lies 4.3 light years away.

The Coalition's five-stage plan to move the Earth involves constructing massive "Earth engines" in Asia and North America. During the "Braking Era," these Earth Engines would generate thrust in the opposite direction of the Earth's movement with the goal of halting its rotation. During the "Deserting Era," the engines would accelerate the Earth until it reaches escape velocity, expelling it from the Solar System. During the acceleration stage (the "First Wandering Era"), the Earth engines would then carry the Earth towards Proxima Centauri. During the deceleration stage (the "Second Wandering Era"), the Earth Engines would then reverse direction, restarting the Earth's rotation and gradually decelerating. In the fifth stage, known as the "Neosolar Era", the Earth would become a satellite of Proxima Centauri. This journey is projected to last 2,500 years.

The acceleration of the Earth Engines accelerates global warming, causing widespread tsunamis around the world. Two factions emerge among humanity: the Takers, who support the Coalition's ambitious programme to move the Earth, and the Leavers, who advocate building vast starships to migrate from the Earth. Unhappy with the Coalition's plans, the Leavers launch an unsuccessful revolt which ends with the surviving rebels being imprisoned. However, significant elements of the public still support the Leavers.

The novella spans the lifetime of the unidentified male protagonist, who lives in China. At an early age, the protagonist's grandfather is severely scalded after being burnt by rain that has been superheated by the Earth engines' plasma beams. While in primary school, the protagonist and his class takes part in a cruise ship tour to educate children about the Coalition's plan to move the Earth. After a fight breaks out between the Takers and Leavers, the teacher Stella Li uses a glass sphere containing a small shrimp, coral and algae to argue that the Leavers' proposed starships are too small to generate a sustainable ecosystem. Following the tour, the Coalition begins the "deserting" stage of their plan.

Since the Earth is no longer orbiting the Sun, the increasingly harsh environmental conditions leads to humanity's' migration into various underground cities. While the protagonist undergoes his secondary education in City FII2, his father serves as a Space Fleet astronaut whose work causes him to spend significant time away from his family. The father begins an affair with Stella. The constant movement of the Earth Engines disturbs the Earth's core, causing a deadly magma seepage that destroys much of the protagonist's hometown, killing 18,000 civilians including the protagonist's mother.

To boost public morale, the Coalition revives the Olympic Games. As a young adult, the protagonist participates in a transoceanic snowmobile race from Shanghai to New York. During the course of the race, the protagonist meets a Japanese contestant named Yamasaki Kayoko, whose vehicle breaks down. The two fall in love and marry following the race. While on a return flight to Asia, the Earth passes through Jupiter's asteroid belt, which results in the Earth's surface being hit by numerous asteroids. While the protagonist and Kayoko survive their journey, the protagonist's father is killed while attempting to clear asteroids from the Earth's path.

While the Earth passes Jupiter's orbit, the protagonist and Kayoko have a son. As the Earth enters its acceleration stage, the Earth Engines resume burning for the centuries-long journey to Proxima Centauri. The couple grow increasingly estranged after the wife comes under the influence of Leavers who claim that the Sun has not changed in the past four centuries. These Leavers claim that the Coalition has destroyed human civilization and the Earth's environment. As the rebellion grows, the couple sends their young son to a government childcare centre.

When the Leavers' revolt breaks out, the couple finds themselves on opposite sides; with the protagonist siding with the Coalition and Kayoko with the rebels. The rebel armies quickly gain control over the Americas, Africa, Oceania, and Antarctica, forcing the Coalition army to retreat to defensive lines around the Earth Engines in Eastern and Central Asia. While recovering in hospital from burns to his arm, the protagonist learns that Kayoko perished in Australia, causing him to turn to alcohol.

Unwilling to risk damage to the Earth Engines, the surviving 5,000 Takers surrender to the rebels. The protagonist watches as the Takers are sentenced to be stripped of the nuclear batteries inside their suits and to be left to freeze to death on Earth's surface. Just hours after the Takers were executed, humanity witnesses the Sun go supernova, destroying much of the Solar System. With the Takers vindicated, humanity decides to continue on their journey to Proxima Centauri.

The final chapter deals with the Wandering Era. After the Earth exits Pluto's orbit, the protagonist, his son and daughter-in-law visit the Earth's surface, where the oxygen and nitrogen have become frozen crystals. As the Earth continues its journey over the centuries, the protagonist has a vision of his descendants and Kayoko enjoying a green Earth in the tri-solar Alpha Centauri system.

== Publication history ==
The Wandering Earth was first published in 2000 by Beijing Guomi. The novella subsequently won the 2000 China Galaxy Science Fiction Award of the Year and was later published as an e-book by Beijing Guomi Digital Technology on 17 June 2013.

The novella was first published in English by Head of Zeus in 2017 as a collected volume of several of Cixin Liu's translated short stories entitled The Wandering Earth. Other stories in this volume include "Mountain", "Sun of China", "For the Benefit of Mankind", "Curse 5.0", "The Micro-Era", "Devourer", "Taking Care of God", "With Her Eyes", and "Cannonball". These stories were translated by Ken Liu, Elizabeth Hanlon, Zac Haluza, Adam Lamphier, and Holger Nahm.

== Reception ==
The novella received mostly mixed reviews in English-language publications. Alexis Ong of Tor.com described it as "forgettable". Pornokitsch reviewer Jared Shurin observed the writing style of the novella, commenting on its exploration of themes related to the needs of the collective over the individual and the scale of apocalyptic disaster. Jaymee Goh of Strange Horizons observed that the Wandering Earth and other short stories in the anthology of the same name had somewhat universal themes.

== Analysis ==
Polish science fiction critic Wojciech Orliński argued that The Wandering Earth represents Liu's endorsement of concepts of world government, consequentialism as well as tacit approval of "China's surveillance and control society".

== Adaptations ==
=== Films ===
==== The Wandering Earth (2019) ====
The Wandering Earth was adapted by Frant Gwo into a 2019 live-action film of the same name. The film was produced by the China Film Group Corporation and starred Wu Jing. It was released on 5 February 2019, and performed well commercially and critically in China and abroad. On 21 February 2019, Netflix acquired the film's international streaming rights.

==== The Wandering Earth 2 (2023) ====
The film inspired a prequel called The Wandering Earth 2, which was directed by Gwo and starred Wu Jing and Andy Lau. The film was released in China and North America on 22 January 2023.

==== The Wandering Earth 3 (2027) ====
The third installment is scheduled for release on February 6, 2027, coinciding with the first day of Chinese New Year.

=== Graphic novel ===
The Wandering Earth was adapted into a graphic novel by Christopher Bec and illustrated by Stefano Raffaele. It was first published in 2020 by CITIC Press Corporation in China. The comic was translated into English by S. Qiouyi Lu with its first English language edition being published by Head of Zeus in 2021.

Benjamin Williams of Comic Book News UK awarded the graphic novel adaptation 4.5 out of 5 stars. He praised Rafaele's lavish artwork for capturing the story's setting and scenery. He regarded the graphic novel adaptation as superior to the source material since it avoided translation issues by using illustrations to tell the story. However, he criticised the characters' lack of depth.

== Sources ==
- Liu, Cixin (2017). The Wandering Earth. Translated by Adam Lamphier; Elizabeth Hanlon; Holger Nahm; Ken Liu; Zac Haluza. Head of Zeus. ISBN 9781784978495.
