= The Wandering Earth (collection) =

2016 short story collection by Liu Cixin

- Title page for The Wandering Earth (2017)
- Author: Liu Cixin
- Translator: Ken Liu, Elizabeth Hanlon, Zac Haluza, Adam Lanphier, and Holger Nahm
- Language: English
- Genre: Science fiction, Hard science fiction
- Publisher: Head of Zeus/Tor Books
- Publication date: 2016/2017
- Pages: 464
- ISBN: 978-1784978518

The Wandering Earth is a collection of ten science-fiction short stories by Chinese writer Liu Cixin, published by Head of Zeus in 2016 and Tor Books in 2017. It includes the eponymous novella The Wandering Earth, which was adapted in the movie The Wandering Earth in 2019 and expanded with the prequel The Wandering Earth 2 in 2023.

== Contents ==
- The Wandering Earth (2000)
- "Mountain" (2006)
- "Sun of China" (2002)
- "For the Benefit of Mankind" (2005)
- "Curse 5.0" (2010)
- "The Micro-Era" (2001)
- "Devourer" (2002)
- "Taking Care of God" (2005)
- "With Her Eyes" (1999)
- "Cannonball" (2003)

== Reception ==
=== Reviews ===
Alexis Ong wrote in the Reactor that "where Liu really shines at his craft is in micro-explorations of smaller, more intimate story arcs," giving "Mountain" as an example, and continuing that "whenever Liu unhitches himself from the hard sci-fi space opera wagon, the impact is immediately palpable—the passion in his writing becomes an unstoppable force. These are the stories that really leap off the page and stick with you long after you're done." The collection's "biggest challenge is sandwiching its meatiest and most delightful stories in between lengthy screeds that more often than not, feel like thin regurgitations of thought experiments, clinically retold oral histories, and mountains of research."

Jaymee Goh wrote on Strange Horizons, that the "ambitious scope of Liu Cixin's fiction is perhaps starker in his short fiction than in his longer work: narratives unfold over lifetimes and eons in several stories, sometimes captured in small snippets of a limited observer." She criticizes, that the "expository paragraphs stretch into pages in the novels—and they are no less intense in the short fiction; their saving grace being that the short stories are themselves split into chapters, so whatever technobabble is happening doesn't feel as endless", but still are "particularly tedious in first contact stories such as 'Mountain,' 'Devourer,' and 'The Micro Era,' where there is barely any human drama and the protagonists are flat." Nonetheless, "in stories such as 'Sun of China' and 'With Her Eyes,' the expository paragraphs deliver hard-hitting emotional landings that are deeply moving." She especially compliments, that the "challenge faced by the translators is not just linguistic, but cultural. Given the conversations surrounding multiculturalism, diversity, and the lack thereof in publishing during the current zeitgeist, there is the added challenge of choosing stories that would translate well to the target market, in this case, Chinese science fiction stories for the 'Western' market."

Liz Comesky wrote on International Examiner, that the collection is "delightful" and "all focused around the Earth, space, human nature, and both the past and future", so that "there is something for everyone held within."

Gareth D Jones wrote on SF Crowsnest, that there "are lengthy sections of explanatory dialogue and background information that might normally be considered info-dumping but Cixin Liu blends these nicely into his fascinating futures in a consciously authoritative way and carries it off with conviction." In summary, it is "a wonderful collection, particularly for fans of hard SF and brings Cixin Liu's own unique flavour to the genre."

=== Awards ===
Five stories in the collection won the Galaxy Award: "With Her Eyes" in 1999, "The Wandering Earth" in 2000, "Sun of China" in 2002, "Cannonball" in 2003 and "For the Benefit of Mankind" in 2005.
