= List of highest-grossing science fiction films =

The following is a list of highest-grossing science fiction films of all time. Superhero films often have some science-fiction elements but are not included here, as they have their own list of highest-grossing superhero films.

== Highest-grossing sci-fi films ==
The following is a list of the highest-grossing science fiction films of all time. The top 11 are among the highest-grossing films of all time.

Rank	Film	Year	Worldwide gross	Ref
1	Avatar	2009	$2,923,706,026	
2	Avatar: The Way of Water	2022	$2,334,484,620	
3	Star Wars: The Force Awakens	2015	$2,068,223,624	
4	Jurassic World	2015	$1,671,537,444	
5	Avatar: Fire and Ash	2025	$1,485,999,890	
6	Star Wars: The Last Jedi	2017	$1,332,539,889	
7	Jurassic World: Fallen Kingdom	2018	$1,308,467,944	
8	Transformers: Dark of the Moon	2011	$1,123,794,079	
9	Transformers: Age of Extinction	2014	$1,104,054,072	
10	Star Wars: The Rise of Skywalker	2019	$1,074,144,248	
11	Rogue One: A Star Wars Story	2016	$1,056,057,273	
12	Star Wars: Episode I – The Phantom Menace	1999	$1,046,386,656	
13	Lilo & Stitch	2025	$1,038,027,526	
14	Jurassic Park	1993	$1,037,535,230	
15	The Super Mario Galaxy Movie	2026	$1,013,045,939	
16	Jurassic World Dominion	2022	$1,004,004,592	
17	Star Wars: Episode III – Revenge of the Sith	2005	$905,595,947	
18	Jurassic World Rebirth	2025	$869,146,189	
19	The Hunger Games: Catching Fire	2013	$865,011,746	
20	Hi, Mom	2021	$841,674,419	
21	Inception	2010	$836,836,967	
22	Transformers: Revenge of the Fallen	2009	$836,303,693	
23	Independence Day	1996	$817,400,891	
24	E.T. the Extra-Terrestrial	1982	$792,910,554	
25	Star Wars	1977	$775,398,007	
26	The Hunger Games: Mockingjay – Part 1	2014	$755,356,711	
27	Interstellar	2014	$733,202,212	
28	Gravity	2013	$723,192,705	
29	Dune: Part Two	2024	$714,844,358	
30	Dawn of the Planet of the Apes	2014	$710,644,566	
31	Transformers	2007	$709,709,780	
32	The Wandering Earth	2019	$699,856,699	
33	The Hunger Games	2012	$694,394,724	
34	Project Hail Mary	2026	$684,041,145	
35	The Hunger Games: Mockingjay – Part 2	2015	$658,344,137	
36	Star Wars: Episode II – Attack of the Clones	2002	$653,779,970	
37	The Martian	2015	$630,162,235	
38	Men in Black 3	2012	$624,026,776	
39	The Lost World: Jurassic Park	1997	$618,638,999	
40	The Wandering Earth 2	2023	$615,023,132	
41	Ready Player One	2018	$607,874,422	
42	Transformers: The Last Knight	2017	$605,425,157	
43	War of the Worlds	2005	$603,873,119	
44	Men in Black	1997	$589,390,539	
45	I Am Legend	2007	$585,410,052	
46	Armageddon	1998	$553,709,788	
47	The Day After Tomorrow	2004	$552,639,571	
48	Star Wars: Episode V – The Empire Strikes Back	1980	$538,375,067	
49	WALL-E	2008	$527,404,782	
50	Terminator 2: Judgment Day	1991	$518,841,619	

== Highest-grossing with inflation ==
Inflation rates around the world vary, complicating inflation adjustment.

Because of the long-term effects of inflation, notably the significant increase of movie theater ticket prices, the list unadjusted for inflation gives far more weight to later films. The unadjusted list, while commonly found in the press, is therefore largely meaningless for comparing films widely separated in time, as many films from earlier eras will never appear on a modern unadjusted list, despite achieving higher commercial success when adjusted for price increases. To compensate for the devaluation of the currency, some charts make adjustments for inflation, but not even this practice fully addresses the issue, since ticket prices and inflation do not necessarily parallel one another. For example, in 1970, tickets cost $1.55 or about $6.68 in inflation-adjusted 2004 dollars; by 1980, prices had risen to about $2.69, a drop to $5.50 in inflation-adjusted 2004 dollars. Ticket prices have also risen at different rates of inflation around the world, further complicating the process of adjusting worldwide grosses.

Another complication is release in multiple formats for which different ticket prices are charged. One notable example of this phenomenon is Avatar, which was also released in 3D and IMAX: almost two-thirds of tickets for that film were for 3D showings with an average price of $10, and about one-sixth were for IMAX showings with an average price over $14.50, compared to a 2010 average price of $7.61 for 2D films. Social and economic factors such as population change and the growth of international markets also have an effect on the number of people purchasing theater tickets, along with audience demographics where some films sell a much higher proportion of discounted children's tickets, or perform better in big cities where tickets cost more.

The measuring system for gauging a film's success is based on unadjusted grosses, mainly because historically this is the way it has always been done because of the practices of the film industry: the box-office receipts are compiled by theaters and relayed to the distributor, which in turn releases them to the media. Converting to a more representative system that counts ticket sales rather than gross is also fraught with problems because the only data available for older films are the sale totals. As the motion picture industry is highly oriented towards marketing currently released films, unadjusted figures are always used in marketing campaigns so that new blockbuster films can much more easily achieve a high sales ranking, and thus be promoted as a "top film of all time", so there is little incentive to switch to a more robust analysis from a marketing or even newsworthy point of view.

Despite the inherent difficulties in accounting for inflation, several attempts have been made. Estimates depend on the price index used to adjust the grosses, and the exchange rates used to convert between currencies can also affect the calculations, both of which can have an effect on the ultimate rankings of an inflation adjusted list. Gone with the Wind—first released in 1939—is generally considered to be the most successful film, with Guinness World Records in 2014 estimating its adjusted global gross at $3.4 billion. Estimates for Gone with the Wind's adjusted gross have varied substantially: its owner, Turner Entertainment, estimated its adjusted earnings at $3.3 billion in 2007, a few years earlier than the Guinness estimate; other estimates fall either side of this amount, with one putting its gross just under $3 billion in 2010, while another provided an alternative figure of $3.8 billion in 2006. Which film is Gone with the Wind's nearest rival depends on the set of figures used: Guinness had Avatar in second place with $3 billion, while other estimates saw Titanic in the runner-up spot with first-run worldwide earnings of almost $2.9 billion at 2010 prices.

Highest-grossing films as of 2024 adjusted for inflation^{[Inf]}
Rank	Title	Worldwide gross (2024 $)	Year
1	Avatar	^{A1}$4,056,000,000	2009
2	Star Wars	$3,652,000,000	1977
3	E.T. the Extra-Terrestrial	^{ET}$2,990,000,000	1982
4	Star Wars: The Force Awakens	^{TFA}$2,642,000,000	2015
5	Avatar: The Way of Water	^{TFA}$2,452,000,000	2022

^{Inf}Inflation adjustment is carried out using the Consumer price index for advanced economies published by the International Monetary Fund. The index is uniformly applied to the grosses in the chart published by Guinness World Records in 2014, beginning with the 2014 index. The figures in the above chart take into account inflation that occurred in 2014, and in every available year since then, through 2022.

^{A1}The adjusted gross for Avatar includes revenue from the original release and all four reissues. The original release and 2010 Special Edition grosses are adjusted from the Guinness base year, whilst the 2020 and 2021 grosses are adjusted from the 2021 index and the 2022 gross from 2022.

^{TFA}The gross for Star Wars: The Force Awakens is adjusted from the 2016 index.

== Box office ticket sales ==
The following is a list of sci-fi films that sold more than 70 million tickets.

Film	Year	Tickets (est.)	Territories included (Note: Box office territories for which the film's ticket sales data are currently known)	Ref
Avatar	2009	356,600,000	Worldwide	
Star Wars	1977	338,400,000	Worldwide	
E.T. the Extra-Terrestrial	1982	276,998,207	Worldwide	
Avatar: The Way of Water	2022	258,100,000	Worldwide	
Star Wars: The Force Awakens	2015	239,342,931	Worldwide	(Note: Star Wars: The Force Awakens: Australia, Canada, Finland, France, Germany, Japan, Norway, Spain, Switzerland, United States – 151,915,216; China – 22,312,973; Argentina, Bolivia, Brazil, Colombia, Mexico, Paraguay, Peru, Ukraine, Uruguay – 20,110,326; Austria, Belgium, Bosnia and Herzegovina, Bulgaria, Croatia, Cyprus, Czech Republic, Denmark, Estonia, Georgia, Hungary, Iceland, Ireland, Italy, Latvia, Lithuania, Luxembourg, Montenegro, Morocco, Netherlands, Poland, Portugal, Romania, Slovakia, Slovenia, Sweden – 17,237,349; United Kingdom – 17,100,000; Russia – 5,797,705; South Korea – 3,273,879; Turkey – 1,149,225; Greece – 446,258)
Jurassic World	2015	206,408,218	Worldwide	(Note: Jurassic World: United States – 77,500,000; China – 37,387,632; Australia, Belgium, Mexico, United Kingdom – 27,765,067; Austria, Bosnia and Herzegovina, Bulgaria, Croatia, Czech Republic, Denmark, Estonia, Finland, France, Greece, Hungary, Iceland, Ireland, Italy, Latvia, Lithuania, Luxembourg, Montenegro, Morocco, Netherlands, Norway, Poland, Portugal, Russia, Slovakia, Slovenia, Spain, Sweden, Turkey – 22,880,115; Argentina, Bolivia, Brazil, Chile, Colombia, Japan, Paraguay, Peru, Romania, Switzerland, Ukraine, Uruguay – 20,179,904; India – 11,000,000; South Korea – 5,547,463; Germany – 4,148,037)
Jurassic Park	1993	185,048,902	Worldwide	(Note: Jurassic Park: United States and United Kingdom – 115,400,000; Brazil, Denmark, Japan, Netherlands, Spain, Sweden – 22,582,550; India – 11,000,000; Germany – 9,395,450; China – 9,001,322; Italy – 7,338,000; France – 6,741,086; South Korea – 1,063,352; Hungary – 950,346; Romania – 760,748; European re-releases (1996–2022) – 498,164; Russia – 317,884)
Jurassic World: Fallen Kingdom	2018	160,547,160	Worldwide	(Note: Jurassic World: Fallen Kingdom: Brazil, Chile, China, Colombia, Japan, Romania, Russia, South Korea, Venezuela – 73,185,038; United States and Canada – 45,944,200; Austria, Bosnia and Herzegovina, Bulgaria, Croatia, Cyprus, Czech Republic, Denmark, Estonia, Finland, France, Greece, Hungary, Iceland, Ireland, Italy, Latvia, Lithuania, Luxembourg, Montenegro, Netherlands, North Macedonia, Norway, Portugal, Slovakia, Slovenia, Sweden, Turkey, United Kingdom – 16,391,684; Belgium and Mexico – 14,683,754; Spain – 3,918,953; Germany – 2,404,197; Argentina – 2,332,076; Poland – 847,600; Ukraine – 635,251; Switzerland – 204,407)
Star Wars Episode I: The Phantom Menace	1999	158,978,082	Worldwide	(Note: Star Wars: Episode I – The Phantom Menace: Australia, Belgium, Finland, France, Japan, Netherlands, Sweden, United States and Canada – 115,027,885; United Kingdom – 13,590,000; Germany – 8,970,932; Austria, Bulgaria, Croatia, Cyprus, Czech Republic, Denmark, Estonia, Greece, Hungary, Iceland, Latvia, Lithuania, Luxembourg, North Macedonia, Norway, Poland, Portugal, Romania, Russia, Slovakia, Slovenia, Switzerland, Turkey – 7,510,482; Spain – 6,431,967; Brazil, Chile, Ukraine – 4,367,041; Italy – 2,333,121; South Korea – 746,654)
Star Wars: The Last Jedi	2017	140,827,080	Worldwide	(Note: Star Wars: The Last Jedi: Australia, United States and Canada – 73,247,787; Austria, Belgium, Bosnia and Herzegovina, Bulgaria, Croatia, Cyprus, Czech Republic, Denmark, Estonia, Finland, Greece, Iceland, Ireland, Italy, Latvia, Lithuania, Luxembourg, Netherlands, North Macedonia, Norway, Poland, Portugal, Romania, Slovakia, Slovenia, Spain, Sweden, Turkey, United Kingdom – 27,743,468; China – 7,156,868; France – 7,080,049; Germany – 5,916,695; Japan – 5,050,000; Mexico – 4,370,000; Brazil – 3,519,279; Russia – 3,159,621; South Korea – 959,577; Hungary – 909,717; Argentina – 774,283; Switzerland – 482,506; Ukraine – 457,230)
Star Wars: The Empire Strikes Back	1980	129,984,978	United States, Europe, Japan, Seoul	(Note: Star Wars: The Empire Strikes Back: United States and United Kingdom – 107,270,600; France, Germany, Italy – 12,582,350; Japan – 8,291,840; Other European territories (1997–2016) – 1,762,184; Seoul City (South Korea) – 78,004)
Avatar: Fire and Ash	2025	127,500,000	Worldwide	
Star Wars: Return of the Jedi	1983	126,255,825	United States, Europe, Japan, Seoul	(Note: Star Wars: Return of the Jedi: United States, United Kingdom, Spain – 104,787,854; France, Germany, Italy – 12,207,226; Japan – 8,048,438; Other European territories (1997–2017) – 1,030,424; Seoul City (South Korea) – 181,883)
Independence Day	1996	124,051,234	Americas, Europe, Japan, Korea	(Note: Independence Day: United States and Canada – 69,268,900; Europe (excluding United Kingdom) – 32,020,189; United Kingdom – 10.79 million; Japan – 7.75 million; Brazil - 3,298,922; South Korea – 923,223)
Hi, Mom	2021	121,002,451	China, Taiwan, Switzerland	
Rogue One: A Star Wars Story	2016	113,043,258	Worldwide	(Note: Rogue One: A Star Wars Story: United States and Canada – 60,441,600; France, Germany, Italy, Spain – 13,266,243; Brazil - 2,861,365; Russia – 2.44 million; Other European territories – 16,891,241; China – 13,043,500; Japan – 3,080,000; South Korea – 1,019,309)
Jurassic World Dominion	2022	111,500,000	Worldwide	
The Wandering Earth	2019	105,967,500	China, United States, Canada	(Note: The Wandering Earth: China – 105,316,900; 105 million tickets for original release.; 316,900 tickets for The Wandering Earth: Beyond 2020 Special Edition.; United States and Canada – 650,600)
Amphibian Man	1962	100,000,000	Soviet Union	
Star Wars Episode III: Revenge of the Sith	2005	98,302,094	Worldwide	
Men in Black	1997	96,543,325	USA, Canada, Europe, East Asia, Brazil	(Note: Men in Black admissions: United States and Canada – 54,616,700; Europe – 33,507,046; Japan – 6,000,000; Brazil – 1,757,473; South Korea – 662,106)
Back to the Future	1985	90,184,478	USA, Europe, Japan, South Korea	(Note: Back to the Future admissions: United States and Denmark – 59,434,344; France, Germany, Italy, Spain – 12,592,872; United Kingdom – 9,719,533; Japan – 8,078,180; South Korea (Seoul City) – 343,292; Other European territories (2011–2018) – 16,257)
Rampage	2018	83,000,000	Worldwide	
Ghostbusters	1984	82,375,218	USA, Canada, Europe, Seoul	(Note: Ghostbusters: United States and Canada – 71,173,700; France, Germany, Italy – 8,046,600; Denmark and Spain – 2,763,555; Seoul City (South Korea) – 344,420; United Kingdom, Belgium, Netherlands, Sweden (2002–2018) – 46,943)
Moon Man	2022	74,628,237	China	
Close Encounters of the Third Kind	1977	74,596,637	Worldwide	(Note: Close Encounters of the Third Kind: United States and Canada – 55,922,700; Other territories – 18,673,937)
Men in Black 3	2012	73,500,000	Worldwide	

== Timeline of highest-grossing films ==
Star Wars is the only franchise to hold it on multiple occasions doing so twice in 1977 and 1999, while Steven Spielberg is the only director to hold it on multiple occasions doing so twice in 1983 and 1993.

Star Wars, E.T. the Extra-Terrestrial, Jurassic Park and Avatar all became the highest grossing films of all time upon the release. Avatar briefly lost it in 2019 to Avengers: Endgame before taking it back with a 2021 re-issue, in 2026 Avengers: Endgame overtook avatar again to claim the number one spot.

Timeline of the highest-grossing film records
Title	Year	Record-setting gross	Ref
20,000 Leagues Under the Sea	1954	$28,200,000^{*}	
Planet of the Apes	1968	$32,600,000^{*}	
2001: A Space Odyssey	1970	$138,000,000–190,000,000	
Star Wars	1978	$410,000,000/$268,500,000^{R}	(Note: Harmetz, Aljean (May 18, 1980). "The Saga Beyond 'Star Wars'". The New York Times. Archived from the original on May 20, 2013. ""Star Wars" has brought 20th Century-Fox approximately $250 million in film rentals ... "Star Wars" grossed $410 million, and his share was enough to allow him to finance its sequel, "The Empire Strikes Back," himself." Alt URL) (Note: Block, Alex Ben; Wilson, Lucy Autrey (30 March 2010). George Lucas's Blockbusting: A Decade-by-Decade Survey of Timeless Movies Including Untold Secrets of Their Financial and Cultural Success. Harper Collins. p. 527. ISBN 978-0-06-196345-2..: Star Wars: "Domestic Rentals: $127.0; Foreign Rentals: $141.5; Production Cost: $13.0 (Initial Release – Unadjusted $s in Millions of $s).")
Star Wars	1982	$530,000,000 ^{‡}	
E.T. the Extra-Terrestrial	1983	$619,000,000–664,000,000	(Note: Block & Wilson 2010, p. 609. "Steven Spielberg, by far the most successful director of the decade, had the highest-grossing movie with 1982's E.T.: The Extra-Terrestrial, which grossed over $664 million in worldwide box office on initial release.")
E.T. the Extra-Terrestrial	1985	$701,000,000 ^{‡}	
Jurassic Park	1993	$914,691,118	(Note: Jurassic Park: Total: "Jurassic Park (1993)". Box Office Mojo. "Worldwide: $1,029,153,882; Production Budget: $63 million"; Original release: "Jurassic Park (1993)". Box Office Mojo. Archived from the original on January 19, 2013. "$914,691,118"; 2011 re-release: "Jurassic Park (2011 re-release)". Box Office Mojo. "United Kingdom: $786,021"; As of 2010: Block & Wilson 2010, pp. 756–757. "Production Cost: $70.0 (Unadjusted $s in Millions of $s) ... Jurassic Park was a smash at the box office, bringing in $920 million in worldwide box office and spawning two sequels.")
Star Wars: Episode I – The Phantom Menace	1999	$924,317,558	(Note: Star Wars Episode I: The Phantom Menace: Total: "Star Wars: Episode I – The Phantom Menace (1999)". Box Office Mojo. "$1,027,044,677"; Original release: "Star Wars: Episode I – The Phantom Menace (1999)". Box Office Mojo. Archived from the original on July 19, 2011. "$924,317,558")
Avatar	2010	$2,743,577,587	
Avatar	2010	$2,788,416,135 ^{‡}	
Avatar	2021	$2,847,397,339 ^{‡}	
Avatar	2022	$2,923,706,026 ^{‡}	

^{R}Distributor rental.

^{*}U.S. and Canada gross only

^{‡}Includes revenue from re-releases. If a film increased its gross through re-releases while holding the record, the year in which it recorded its highest gross is also noted in italics.

== Highest-grossing film franchises ==
The following is a list of highest-grossing sci-fi film franchises and film series of all time. The top four are among the highest-grossing franchises of all time. Star Wars sits top with a total gross of $10.3B, while Avatar has the best average of any science fiction series at $2.25B.

† Background shading indicates that at least one film in the series is playing in the week commencing 20 November 2026 in theaters around the world.

Highest-grossing sci-fi film franchises and film series ^{[§]}(The films in each franchise can be viewed by selecting "show".)

Rank	Series	Total worldwide gross	No. of films	Average of films	Highest-grossing film

1	Star Wars	$10,739,241,226	13	$826,095,479	The Force Awakens ($2,068,223,624)
Episodes / $8,818,049,454 / 9 / $979,783,273 / The Force Awakens ($2,068,223,624); / Sequel trilogy / $4,482,740,296 / 3 / $1,494,246,765 / The Force Awakens ($2,068,223,624); 1 / VII – The Force Awakens (2015) / $2,071,310,218; 2 / VIII – The Last Jedi (2017) / $1,334,407,706; 3 / IX – The Rise of Skywalker (2019) / $1,077,022,372 / Prequel trilogy / $2,605,892,080 / 3 / $868,630,693 / The Phantom Menace ($1,046,515,409); 1 / I – The Phantom Menace (1999) / $1,046,515,409; 2 / III – Revenge of the Sith (2005) / $905,595,947; 3 / II – Attack of the Clones (2002) / $653,780,724 / Original trilogy / $1,817,474,912 / 3 / $605,824,971 / A New Hope ($775,398,007); 1 / IV – A New Hope (1977) / $775,398,507; 2 / V – The Empire Strikes Back (1980) / $559,610,023; 3 / VI – Return of the Jedi (1983) / $482,466,382
/ Anthology films / $1,450,345,194 / 2 / $725,172,597 / Rogue One ($1,057,420,387); 1 / Rogue One (2016) / $1,057,420,387; 2 / Solo (2018) / $392,924,807
The Mandalorian and Grogu (2026) / $345,838,416
The Clone Wars (2008) / $68,282,844

2
Jurassic Park
$6,878,116,688
7
$982,588,098
Jurassic World ($1,671,537,444)

	Jurassic World series	$4,853,161,650	4	$1,213,290,413	Jurassic World ($1,671,537,444)
1	Jurassic World (2015)	$1,671,537,444			
2	Fallen Kingdom (2018)	$1,308,473,425			
3	Dominion (2022)	$1,004,004,592			
4	Rebirth (2025)	$869,146,189			

	Jurassic Park trilogy	$2,024,955,038	3	$674,985,013	Jurassic Park ($1,037,535,230)
1	Jurassic Park (1993)	$1,037,535,230			
2	The Lost World (1997)	$618,638,999			
3	Jurassic Park III (2001)	$368,780,809			

3	Avatar	$6,744,190,536	3	$2,248,063,512	Avatar ($2,923,706,026)
1	Avatar (2009)	$2,923,706,026			
2	The Way of Water (2022)	$2,334,484,620			
3	Fire and Ash (2025)	$1,485,999,890			

4
Transformers †
$5,426,585,299
9
$602,953,922
Dark of the Moon ($1,123,794,079)

	Main series	$5,418,066,011	8	$677,258,251	Dark of the Moon ($1,123,794,079)
1	Dark of the Moon (2011)	$1,123,794,079			
2	Age of Extinction (2014)	$1,104,054,072			
3	Revenge of the Fallen (2009)	$836,303,693			
4	Transformers (2007)	$709,709,780			
5	The Last Knight (2017)	$605,425,157			
6	Bumblebee (2018)	$467,989,645			
7	Rise of the Beasts (2023)	$441,381,193			
8	One (2024)	$129,408,392			

The Transformers: The Movie (1986) †	$10,934,089

5
The Hunger Games †
$3,373,085,662
6
$562,180,944
Catching Fire ($865,765,625)

	Main series	$2,969,436,607	4	$742,359,152	Catching Fire ($865,765,625)
1	Catching Fire (2013)	$865,765,625			
2	Mockingjay – Part 1 (2014)	$755,413,630			
3	The Hunger Games (2012)	$694,487,388			
4	Mockingjay – Part 2 (2015)	$653,769,964			

	Prequel films †	$403,649,055	2	$201,824,528	The Ballad of Songbirds & Snakes ($347,649,055)
1	The Ballad of Songbirds & Snakes (2023)	$347,649,055			
2	Sunrise on the Reaping (2026) †	$56,000,000			

6	Planet of the Apes	$2,600,946,291	10	$260,094,629	Dawn of the Planet of the Apes ($708,835,589)
/ Reboot series (Chernin Entertainment) / $2,260,934,551 / 4 / $565,233,638 / Dawn of the Planet of the Apes ($708,835,589); 1 / Dawn of the Planet of the Apes (2014) / $708,835,589; 2 / War for the Planet of the Apes (2017) / $490,719,763; 3 / Rise of the Planet of the Apes (2011) / $481,801,049; 4 / Kingdom of the Planet of the Apes (2024) / $397,378,150
Planet of the Apes (2001) / $362,211,740
/ Original series (APJAC Productions) / $160,000,000 / 5 / $32,000,000 / Planet of the Apes; 1 / Planet of the Apes (1968); 2 / Beneath the Planet of the Apes (1970); 3 / Escape from the Planet of the Apes (1971); 4 / Conquest of the Planet of the Apes (1972); 5 / Battle for the Planet of the Apes (1973)

7	Star Trek	$2,266,723,196	13	$174,363,323	Into Darkness ($467,381,584)
/ Kelvin Timeline / $1,189,710,370 / 3 / $396,570,123 / Into Darkness ($467,381,584); 1 / Into Darkness (2013) / $467,381,584; 2 / Star Trek (2009) / $385,680,446; 3 / Beyond (2016) / $336,648,340
/ The Original Series / $621,900,000 / 6 / $103,650,000 / The Motion Picture ($139,000,000); 1 / The Motion Picture (1979) / $139,000,000; 2 / IV: The Voyage Home (1986) / $133,000,000; 3 / VI: The Undiscovered Country (1991) / $96,900,000; 4 / II: The Wrath of Khan (1982) / $95,800,000; 5 / III: The Search for Spock (1984) / $87,000,000; 6 / V: The Final Frontier (1989) / $70,200,000
/ The Next Generation / $455,112,826 / 4 / $113,778,207 / First Contact ($150,000,000); 1 / First Contact (1996) / $150,000,000; 2 / Generations (1994) / $120,000,000; 3 / Insurrection (1998) / $117,800,000; 4 / Nemesis (2002) / $67,312,826

8	Terminator	$2,105,699,296	6	$350,949,883	Judgment Day ($520,881,154)
1	Judgment Day (1991)	$520,881,154			
2	Genisys (2015)	$440,603,537			
3	Rise of the Machines (2003)	$433,371,112			
4	Salvation (2009)	$371,353,001			
5	Dark Fate (2019)	$261,119,292			
6	The Terminator (1984)	$78,371,200			

9
Alien
$1,995,371,782
9
$221,707,976
Prometheus ($403,354,469)

	Main series	$1,687,653,807	7	$241,093,401	Prometheus ($403,354,469)
1	Prometheus (2012)	$403,354,469			
2	Romulus (2024)	$350,865,342			
3	Covenant (2017)	$240,892,187			
4	Alien (1979)	$188,034,787			
5	Aliens (1986)	$183,316,455			
6	Resurrection (1997)	$161,376,069			
7	Alien 3 (1992)	$159,814,498			

	Alien vs. Predator	$307,717,975	2	$153,858,988	Alien vs. Predator ($177,427,090)
1	Alien vs. Predator (2004)	$177,427,090			
2	Requiem (2007)	$130,290,885			

10	Men in Black	$1,909,126,819	4	$477,281,705	Men in Black 3 ($624,026,776)
1	Men in Black 3 (2012)	$624,026,776			
2	Men in Black (1997)	$589,390,539			
3	Men in Black II (2002)	$441,818,803			
4	International (2019)	$253,890,701			

12	The Wandering Earth	$1,315,015,644	2	$657,507,822	The Wandering Earth ($699,992,512)
1	The Wandering Earth (2020)	$699,992,512			
2	The Wandering Earth 2 (2023)	$615,023,132			

13	Lilo & Stitch	$1,312,776,746	2	$656,388,373	Lilo & Stitch (2025) ($1,038,027,526)
1	Lilo & Stitch (2025)	$1,038,027,526			
2	Lilo & Stitch (2002)	$274,749,220			

14	Resident Evil	$1,237,686,980	10	$123,768,698	Resident Evil: The Final Chapter ($312,257,250)
/ Original series / $1,233,229,454 / 6 / $205,538,242 / The Final Chapter ($312,257,250); 1 / The Final Chapter (2017) / $312,257,250; 2 / Afterlife (2010) / $300,228,084; 3 / Retribution (2012) / $240,004,424; 4 / Extinction (2007) / $148,412,065; 5 / Apocalypse (2004) / $129,342,769; 6 / Resident Evil (2002) / $102,984,862
/ Animated series / $4,067,739 / 3 / $1,355,913 / Resident Evil: Damnation ($2,325,035); 1 / Damnation (2012) / $2,325,035; 2 / Vendetta (2017) / $1,203,792; 3 / Degeneration (2008) / $538,912
Welcome to Raccoon City (2021) / $41,851,340

15	Independence Day	$1,207,082,826	2	$603,541,413	Independence Day ($817,400,891)
1	Independence Day (1996)	$817,400,891			
2	Resurgence (2016)	$389,681,935			

16
Dune
$1,151,789,223
3
$383,929,741
Dune: Part Two ($714,844,358)

	Denis Villeneuve series	$1,120,862,358	2	$560,431,179	Dune: Part Two ($714,844,358)
1	Dune: Part Two (2024)	$714,844,358			
2	Dune (2021)	$406,018,000			

Dune (1984)	$30,926,865

17
Ghostbusters
$1,145,945,826
5
$229,189,165
Ghostbusters ($295,212,467)

	Original series	$916,798,317	4	$229,199,579	Ghostbusters (1984) ($295,212,467)
1	Ghostbusters (1984)	$295,212,467			
2	Ghostbusters II (1989)	$215,394,738			
3	Afterlife (2021)	$204,334,455			
4	Frozen Empire (2024)	$201,856,657			

Answer the Call (2016)	$229,147,509

17	Back to the Future	$983,748,298	3	$327,916,099	Back to the Future ($402,420,713)
1	Back to the Future (1985)	$402,420,713			
2	Back to the Future Part II (1989)	$331,950,002			
3	Back to the Future Part III (1990)	$244,527,583			
4	Back to the Future Day (2015)	$4,850,000			

18	Maze Runner	$949,063,154	3	$316,354,385	The Maze Runner ($348,319,861)
1	The Maze Runner (2014)	$348,319,861			
2	The Scorch Trials (2015)	$312,325,103			
3	The Death Cure (2018)	$288,418,190			

19
Predator
$935,444,330
7
$133,634,904
Badlands ($184,561,056)

	Main series	$627,726,355	5	$125,545,271	Badlands ($184,561,056)
1	Badlands (2025)	$184,561,056			
2	The Predator (2018)	$160,542,134			
3	Predators (2010)	$127,234,389			
4	Predator (1987)	$98,268,458			
5	Predator 2 (1990)	$57,120,318			

	Alien vs. Predator	$307,717,975	2	$153,858,988	Alien vs. Predator ($177,427,090)
1	Alien vs. Predator (2004)	$177,427,090			
2	Requiem (2007)	$130,290,885			

20	The Divergent Series	$765,409,015	3	$255,136,338	Insurgent ($297,276,329)
1	Insurgent (2016)	$297,276,329			
2	Divergent (2014)	$288,885,818			
3	Allegiant (2016)	$179,246,868			

^{*}Canada and U.S. gross only.
^{R}Distributor rental.

== Highest grossing films by year ==
Year	Film	Gross	Budget	Ref
2026	The Super Mario Galaxy Movie	$1,012,570,644	$110,000,000	
2025	Avatar: Fire and Ash	$1,485,999,890	$400,000,000	
2024	Dune: Part Two	$714,844,358	$190,000,000	
2023	The Wandering Earth 2	$615,023,132	$162,000,000	
2022	Avatar: The Way of Water	$2,334,484,620 ($2,320,250,281)	$350,000,000–460,000,000	
2021	Hi, Mom	$839,098,445	$59,000,000	
2020	Tenet	$365,304,105	$205,000,000	
2019	Star Wars: The Rise of Skywalker	$1,074,144,248	$275,000,000–416,000,000	
2018	Jurassic World: Fallen Kingdom	$1,308,467,944	$170,000,000–431,600,000	
2017	Star Wars: The Last Jedi	$1,332,539,889	$200,000,000–317,000,000	
2016	Rogue One: A Star Wars Story	$1,056,057,273	$200,000,000–265,000,000	
2015	Star Wars: The Force Awakens	$2,068,223,624	$447,000,000	
2014	Transformers: Age of Extinction	$1,104,039,076	$210,000,000	
2013	The Hunger Games: Catching Fire	$865,011,746	$130,000,000–140,000,000	
2012	The Hunger Games	$694,394,724	$78,000,000	
2011	Transformers: Dark of the Moon	$1,123,794,079	$195,000,000	
2010	Inception	$836,836,967 ($825,532,764)	$160,000,000	
2009	Avatar	$2,923,706,026 ($2,743,577,587)	$237,000,000	
2008	WALL-E	$527,404,782	$180,000,000	
2007	Transformers	$709,709,780	$150,000,000–200,000,000	
2006	Déjà Vu	$180,557,550	$75,000,000	
2005	Star Wars: Episode III – Revenge of the Sith	$905,595,947 ($849,997,605)	$113,000,000	
2004	The Day After Tomorrow	$552,639,571	$125,000,000	
2003	Terminator 3: Rise of the Machines	$433,371,112	$187,300,000	
2002	Star Wars: Episode II – Attack of the Clones	$653,779,970	$115,000,000	
2001	Jurassic Park III	$368,780,809	$93,000,000	
2000	Hollow Man	$190,213,455	$95,000,000	
1999	Star Wars: Episode I – The Phantom Menace	$1,046,386,656 ($924,305,084)	$115,000,000	
1998	Armageddon	$553,709,788	$140,000,000	
1997	The Lost World: Jurassic Park	$618,638,999	$73,000,000	
1996	Independence Day	$817,400,891	$75,000,000	
1995	Waterworld	$264,218,220	$172,000,000–175,000,000	
1994	Stargate	$196,567,262	$55,000,000	
1993	Jurassic Park	$1,033,928,303 ($912,667,947)	$63,000,000	
1992	Alien 3	$159,814,498	$50,000,000–60,000,000	
1991	Terminator 2: Judgment Day	$520,881,154	$94,000,000–102,000,000	
1990	Total Recall	$261,317,921	$48,000,000–80,000,000	
1989	Back to the Future Part II	$331,950,002	$40,000,000	
1988	Alien Nation	$32,155,047	$16,000,000	
1987	Predator	$98,268,458	$15,000,000–18,000,000	
1986	Star Trek IV: The Voyage Home	$133,000,000	$26,000,000	
1985	Back to the Future	$402,420,713 ($381,109,762)	$19,000,000	(Note: Back to the Future: Original release: "Back to the Future (1985)". Box Office Mojo. Archived from the original on August 6, 2020. "Worldwide: $381,109,762; Production Budget: $19 million"; 2014 re-release: "Back to the Future (2014 re-release)". Box Office Mojo. "$5,641,847"; 2020 re-release: "Back to the Future (2020 re-release)". Box Office Mojo. "$571,778"; 2021 re-release: "Back to the Future (2021 re-release)". Box Office Mojo. "$1,437,152"; 2023 re-release: "Back to the Future (2023 re-release)". Box Office Mojo. "$536,629"; 2025 re-release: "Back to the Future (40th Anniversary)". Box Office Mojo. "$13,123,545")
1984	Ghostbusters	$296,187,079 ($229,242,989)	$25,000,000–30,000,000	
1983	Return of the Jedi	$475,106,177 ($385,845,197)	$32,500,000–42,700,000	
1982	E.T. the Extra-Terrestrial	$792,910,554 ($619,000,000–664,000,000)	$10,500,000	
1981	Time Bandits	$42,368,025 ($42,365,581)	$5,000,000	
1980	The Empire Strikes Back	$538,375,067 ($413,562,607)	$30,500,000	
1979	Star Trek: The Motion Picture	$139,000,000	$44,000,000	
1978	Farewell to Space Battleship Yamato	$43,000,000	$1,700,000	
1977	Star Wars	$775,398,007 ($530,000,000)	$11,000,000	
1976	Logan's Run	$25,000,000	$7,000,000–8,000,000	
1975	Rollerball	$30,000,000	$5,000,000–6,000,000	
1968	2001: A Space Odyssey	$190,000,000	$10,500,000	
1956	Invasion of the Body Snatchers	$3,000,000	$416,911	
1954	20,000 Leagues Under the Sea	$28,200,000	$5,000,000	

== Biggest opening weekends ==
The following is a list of the highest worldwide openings for sci-fi films.

Rank	Film	Worldwide opening	Year	Ref
1	Star Wars: The Force Awakens	$528,966,675	2015	
2	Jurassic World	$524,909,010	2015	
3	Star Wars: The Last Jedi	$450,821,889	2017	
4	Avatar: The Way of Water	$441,703,887	2022	
5	Jurassic World Dominion	$386,000,000	2022	
6	Transformers: Dark of the Moon	$382,425,000	2011	
7	Star Wars: The Rise of Skywalker	$373,500,000	2019	
8	Avatar: Fire and Ash	$347,335,518	2025	
9	Lilo & Stitch	$341,000,000	2025	
10	Jurassic World Rebirth	$322,099,000	2025	

== See also ==
- List of highest-grossing films

== Notes ==
=== Franchises ===
- ^{§} "Franchise Index". Box Office Mojo.
- Godzilla
  - "Search Results: "godzilla"". Box Office Mojo.
  - "Godzilla Movie List". Toho Kingdom.
  - Schil, Charlie (7 May 1986). "Godzilla's back—older, fatter and still flaky". Pacific Stars and Stripes. p. 25 – via NewspaperArchive. "With the exception of Dr. Frankenstein's creature and King Kong, Godzilla is probably the most enduring and profitable monster of filmdom. He's appeared in at least a dozen movies over three decades and they've grossed an incredible half-billion dollars."
  - Edelson, Edward (1980). Great animals of the movies. Doubleday. p. 85. ISBN 9780385147286. "By the late 1970s, Godzilla films settled down to a comfortable formula. Toho was making two films a year. Each cost in the neighborhood of $1.2 million and could be counted on to earn about $20 million. Godzilla had become a world traveler. (...) Another reason for the box-office appeal of Godzilla was the variety of his enemies. In various films, Godzilla has fought Ghidrah the Three-Headed Monster, something called the Smog Monster (which feeds on factory fumes and auto exhausts), a giant bird that created typhoons by flapping its wings and none other than King Kong."
  - Ryfle, Steve (1998). Japan's Favorite Mon-Star: The Unauthorized Biography of the Big G. ECW Press. ISBN 9781550223484.
  - American films
    - Godzilla (2014): "Godzilla (2014)". The Numbers.
    - For others, see "godzilla", Box Office Mojo.
  - Toho grosses
    - 1954–mid 80s cum: see Schil (1986). The Godzilla franchise grossed an estimate $500 million during its first thirty years. This is taken as the cumulative gross for the Showa era, with the gross for The Return of Godzilla/Godzilla 1985 ($15 million) subtracted and replaced by the reissue grosses for the original film (approximately $600,000) and Godzilla vs. Mechagodzilla ($14 million), roughly balancing out.
    - Godzilla (1954): see Toho Kingdom for Japanese gross ($2.25 million) and Box Office Mojo for US gross (approx. $600,000). For the American re-edit, Godzilla, King of the Monsters! ($2 million), see Ryfle (1998, p. 58)
    - Godzilla vs. Mechagodzilla (1974): see Edelson (1980) for initial worldwide gross ($20 million), and Box Office Mojo for 2002 Japanese reissue ($14,122,958).
    - Terror of Mechagodzilla (1975): see Edelson (1980).
    - The Return of Godzilla (1984): see Toho Kingdom; see Box Office Mojo for Godzilla 1985 gross.
    - 1989–1992; 1994; 1999–2000: see Toho Kingdom.
    - Godzilla vs. Mechagodzilla II (1993): "Godzilla about to return to old stomping grounds". Elyria Chronicle Telegram. July 29, 1994. p. 17 – via NewspaperArchive. "Last year's Godzilla vs. Mecha-Godzilla brought in $36 million at the box office and generated another $158 million in related sales of books and merchandise — huge numbers for the Japanese entertainment industry."
    - Godzilla vs. Destoroyah (1995): see Ryfle (1998, p. 346).
    - 2001–2018: see Box Office Mojo.
- The Hunger Games
  - "The Hunger Games – Worldwide (Unadjusted)". Box Office Mojo.
- Ice Age
  - "Ice Age – Worldwide (Unadjusted)". Box Office Mojo.
  - "Ice Age: The Meltdown 3D (2014)". Box Office Mojo. "Foreign Total: $6,095,750"
- Jurassic Park
  - "Jurassic Park – Worldwide (Unadjusted)". Box Office Mojo.
  - "Jurassic Park (2011 re-release)". Box Office Mojo. "United Kingdom: $786,021"
- Star Trek
  - "Box Office History for Star Trek Movies". The Numbers. Nash Information Services.
- Star Wars
  - "Star Wars (1977)". Box Office Mojo.
  - "The Empire Strikes Back". Box Office Mojo.
  - "Return of the Jedi". Box Office Mojo.
  - "The Phantom Menace". Box Office Mojo.
  - "Attack of the Clones". Box Office Mojo.
  - "Revenge of the Sith". Box Office Mojo.
  - "The Clone Wars". Box Office Mojo.
  - Disney releases (2015–present): "Star Wars – Worldwide (Unadjusted)". Box Office Mojo.
- Transformers
  - "Transformers – Worldwide (Unadjusted)". Box Office Mojo.
