= For the Benefit of Mankind =

2005 short story by Liu Cixin

- Short story by Liu Cixin
- Country: China
- Language: Chinese
- Genre: Science fiction

Publication
- Published in: Science Fiction World
- Publication type: Periodical
- Media type: Print
- Publication date: November 2005

"For the Benefit of Mankind" (Chinese: 赡养人类; pinyin: shànyǎng rénlèi) is a science-fiction short story by Chinese writer Liu Cixin, first published in Science Fiction World (Chinese: 科幻世界; pinyin: kēhuàn shìjiè) in Chengdu in Sichuan Province in November 2005. The short story was included in the collection The Wandering Earth published by Head of Zeus in October 2017.

== Plot ==
After the events of "Taking Care of God", the first spaceship of the other humans has arrived above Earth as the vanguard of an entire fleet. Since then, the ultra-rich upper class has behaved strangely: the assassin Smoothbore is first paid by them to murder as many homeless people as possible before they change their minds and offer them huge sums of money instead. The homeless people are only supposed to comply with the condition that they truthfully state who they received the money from if they are asked. When Smoothbore meets a representative of the other humans, the strange behavior is explained: after the arrival of the fleet of the other humans, they want to treat humanity on Earth exactly as it treats the poorest 1% of its own population. The representative of the other humans explains that they themselves are all homeless people who were driven out of their home world. Once, as on Earth, the lower and upper classes were connected by the tube of education and advancement was always possible. But after a technological explosion that, among other things, made it possible to store knowledge directly inside the brain, the upper class quickly acquired so much knowledge that an insurmountable gap to the lower class arose. Combined with the unstoppable progress of capitalism, this ultimately led to all wealth being concentrated in a single person, called the "Last Capitalist". Even all of the planet's raw materials belonged to him and were protected by robots. The other person describes the cruel consequences of this world, in which even breathable air had to be bought and people had to use their own bodies for raw materials, while those of the planet remained completely untouched. After Smoothbore has heard all this, he returns to the rich upper class and tells them everything. Then they burn over a million yuan together to heat their soup.

== Translations ==
"For the Benefit of Mankind" was also translated into German (2019) and Spanish (2019).

== Reception ==
=== Reviews ===
Publishers Weekly wrote that Liu Cixin "cushions his rougher truths with a wry humor", giving as example the spaceships being described as "intergalactic cold-relief capsules".

Alexis Ong wrote in the Reactor Magazine, that the short story "is where Liu really starts to have fun" since "even when Liu's staple tropes [....] show up, his uncharacteristic genre experiments with noir and mystery make for a sharp, engrossing read." In particular, "the Last Capitalist [....] adds bleak humor to a very real speculative nightmare."

Jaymee Goh criticized in Strange Horizons, that "women are not particularly vilified, but they are consistently underdeveloped in favour of the male protagonists."

Liz Comesky wrote on International Examiner, that the short story is a "beautiful exploration on humanity and the cost of money. 'For the Benefit of Mankind' cannot be recommended enough."

=== Awards ===
"For the Benefit of Mankind" won the Galaxy Award in 2005.
