= Devourer =

2002 short story by Liu Cixin

- Short story by Liu Cixin
- Country: China
- Language: Chinese
- Genre: Science fiction

Publication
- Published in: Science Fiction World
- Publication type: Periodical
- Media type: Print
- Publication date: November 2002

"Devourer" (Chinese: 人和吞食者; pinyin: rén hé tūnshízhě) is a science-fiction short story by Chinese writer Liu Cixin, first published in Science Fiction World in Chengdu in Sichuan Province in November 2002. The short story was included in the collection The Wandering Earth published by Head of Zeus in October 2017.

== Plot ==
An alien crystal from Eridanus reaches Earth and warns humanity of the arrival of the "Devourer". Shortly afterwards, a spaceship belonging to the Devourer reaches Earth as a vanguard, and a several-meter-tall and unusually reptilian-looking alien emerges from it, which humans call "Fangs". At a reception with the world's heads of state, Fangs explains that all the raw materials of the planets in the Solar System will be plundered by the Devourer when it arrives, and then eats a European head of state. Fangs justifies this as a taste test, because people do not have to face extinction, but can be kept for their delicious meat on board the Devourer and can live a luxurious life until they are slaughtered at the age of sixty. The condition for this, however, is that the troublesome moon must be removed from orbit before the Devourer arrives, which is to be done by blasting rock with nuclear weapons.

Two hundred years later, the ring-shaped Devourer is enclosing the Earth, but a secret plan has been devised to blow up the moon to push it onto a collision course with it. The Devourer is badly damaged by the evasive maneuver, but it still manages to destroy the Earth. After the Devourer leaves, the last humans to have awakened from cryogenic sleep turn to Fangs in anger, asking what right his civilization had to devour the Earth. Fangs then reveals that the Devourer civilization has descended from the dinosaurs. This also shows why their similarities to humans were stranger than their differences. Although a colony of humans now lives on the Devourer as planned and in such luxury that they look back on their old life as completely primitive, the last humans still want to stay on Earth, die a peaceful death and then serve as food for the ants so that life on Earth can begin anew.

== Translations ==
"Devourer" was also translated into German (2018), Korean (2019) and Spanish (2019).

== Reviews ==
Jaymee Goh wrote on Strange Horizons, that the "expository paragraphs [....] are particularly tedious in first contact stories such as 'Mountain,' 'Devourer,' and 'The Micro Era,' where there is barely any human drama and the protagonists are flat." In particular for "Devourer", she remarks that the "ridiculousness can paper over the ethical questions raised" since "the text is asking the reader to identify and recognize the humanity of an alien", who is "a genocidal colonizer" and "a giant thirty-foot-tall dinosaur".

Liz Comesky wrote on International Examiner, that the short story was a "personal favorite."

Gareth D Jones wrote on SF Crowsnest: "There were several concepts here that reminded me of parts of 'Three-Body' and I wondered whether this had been a test run for some of those ideas."
