= Mountain (short story) =

2006 short story by Liu Cixin

- Short story by Liu Cixin
- Country: China
- Language: Chinese
- Genre: Science fiction

Publication
- Published in: Science Fiction World
- Publication type: Periodical
- Media type: Print
- Publication date: January 2006

"Mountain" (Chinese: 山; pinyin: shān) is a science-fiction short story by Chinese writer Liu Cixin, first published in Science Fiction World in Chengdu in Sichuan Province in January 2006. The short story was included in the collection The Wandering Earth published by Head of Zeus in October 2017.

== Plot ==
Feng Fan is on board a research vessel in the ocean and categorically refuses to go ashore. One night, Feng Fan confides to the captain to be a passionate mountain climber, but also to have been responsible for the deaths of several people on his last journey. Although there were no legal consequences, as without the act he would have died as well, Feng Fan nevertheless followed an advice to punish himself and stay as far away from all mountains as possible. During the conversation, an alien spaceship approaches Earth and, using its own gravity, creates a large mountain of seawater in front of the research vessel. While the vessel is turning around, Feng Fan climbs into a boat and heads to the top. The aliens initiate contact with him and tell him their story. As completely mechanical beings with no fluid in their bodies, they originated in the core of a planet and therefore discovered all of physics in a completely different way than humans. They for example only discovered gravity when moving away from the core in air bubbles and the dug-up stones moved to the other side during their sleep. Such air bubbles were particularly risky, as they slowly took away the little space that their homeland had. One day, they came across deadly water for the first time, called "changing stone", since the entire planet is surrounded by an ocean. It therefore was a particularly risky struggle for the aliens to reach the surface. Feng Fan is impressed by how much effort they had to make to be where humanity began. The aliens now see the entire universe itself as an empty bubble in the middle of a larger medium and want to find its boundary. The aliens wish good luck to Feng Fan, who then drifts alone in the sea, but with a tremendous will to survive: the story must be told and more mountains must be climbed.

== Translations ==
"Mountain" was also translated into German (2019), Korean (2019) and Spanish (2019).

== Reviews ==
Alexis Ong wrote in the Reactor Magazine, that the short story "allows its sole protagonist enough breathing room to actually be a person, at least until it devolves into a play-by-play retelling of an entire civilization's development."

Jaymee Goh wrote on Strange Horizons, that the "expository paragraphs ... are particularly tedious in first contact stories such as 'Mountain,' 'Devourer,' and 'The Micro Era,' where there is barely any human drama and the protagonists are flat."

Liz Comesky wrote on International Examiner, that the short story is a "delightful piece of worldbuilding and alien history for anyone seeking such a story."
