= Galaxy Science Fiction Convention =

Science fiction convention held by Science Fiction World

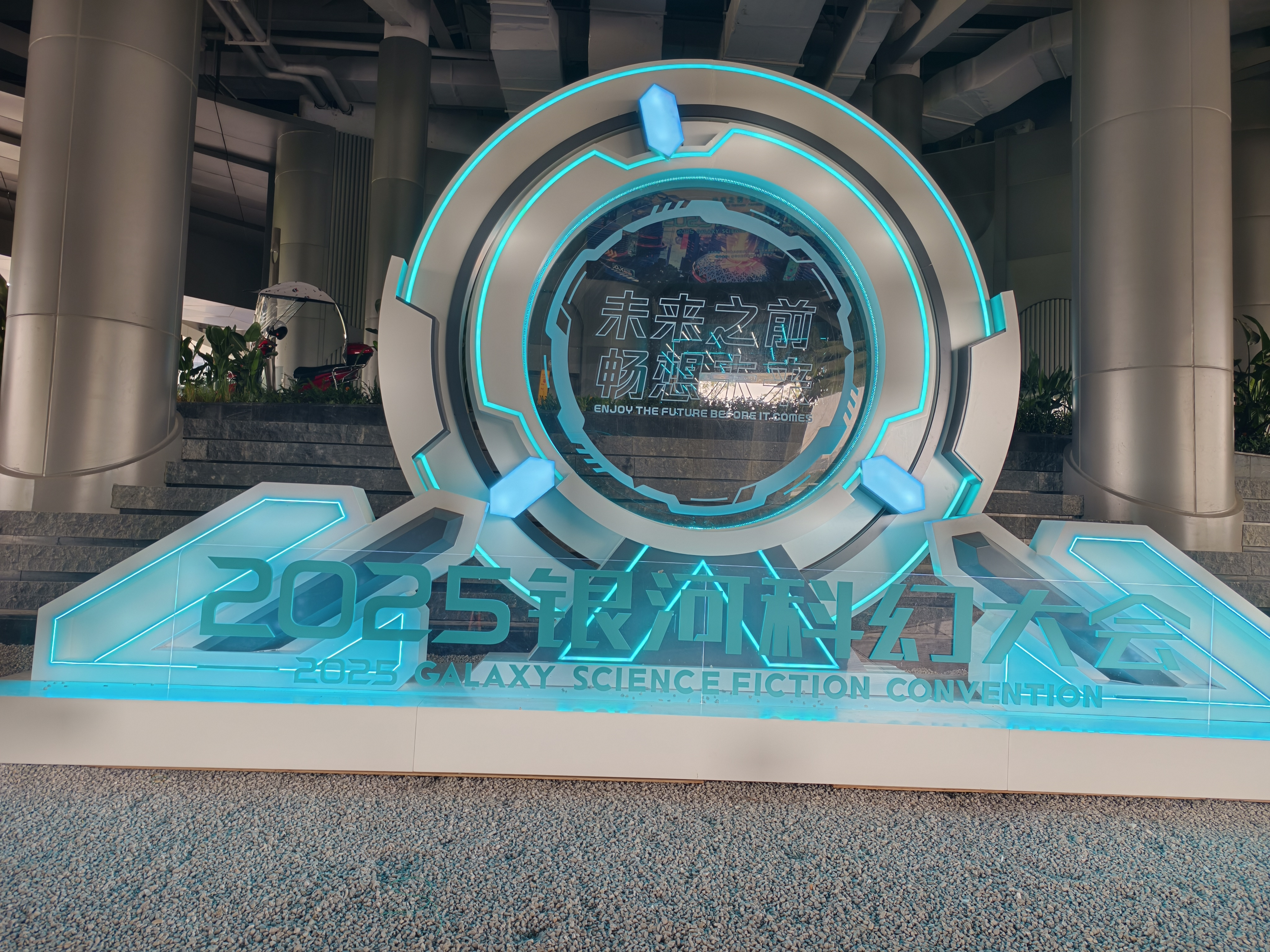
- 2025 Galaxy Science Fiction Convention
- Status: Active
- Genre: Conferences
- Frequency: Bi-annually
- Location: Chengdu
- Country: China
- Years active: 35
- Inaugurated: May 20, 1991
- Most recent: 19 September 2025
- Organizer: Sichuan Provincial Association for Science and Technology
- Filing status: Non-profit

The Galaxy Science Fiction Convention (Chinese: 银河科幻大会), or Galaxycon, is a significant international science fiction convention brand in the field of Chinese science fiction culture, hosted by the Science Fiction World magazine under the Sichuan Provincial Association for Science and Technology.

The convention originated from the first Galaxy Award ceremony in China in 1986. The award, which began preparations in 1985 and was officially presented in 1986, is an important symbol of Chinese science fiction literature. In 1991, the World SF annual meeting was held in Chengdu, marking the official entry of the Chinese science fiction community into the international exchange stage. This also became the historical starting point for the Galaxy Science Fiction Convention.The "Beijing International Science Fiction Convention" held in Beijing in 1997 and the "China (Chengdu) International Science Fiction & Fantasy Convention" held in Chengdu in 2007 further solidified the convention's brand.

In 2017, the fourth convention was held concurrently with the "China Science Fiction Convention" in Chengdu. The convention was renamed the "China (Chengdu) International Science Fiction Convention" and announced its upgrade to a biennial permanent science fiction event, permanently located in Chengdu. In 2023, the 6th China (Chengdu) International Science Fiction Convention and the 81st World Science Fiction Convention, both held in Chengdu, will be co-hosted under the theme "Chasing Dreams in the East, Chengdu Shines on the World." The convention will bring together over 1,200 guests and over 20,000 science fiction fans from 35 countries and regions, and will host over 200 salons, exhibitions, and the Hugo Awards ceremony. This marks the first time China has hosted such a top-tier global science fiction event.

The 2025 convention, renamed the "Galaxy Science Fiction Convention," was held on the Chengdu Science and Technology Innovation Eco-Island under the theme "Before the Future, Enjoy the Future." It includes the 36th Galaxy Awards ceremony, the release of science fiction creations by young people, and the signing of major science fiction projects.

The Galaxy Science Fiction Convention has become China's oldest and most international science fiction cultural event brand. The convention covers multiple sectors including literature, publishing, film and television, games, academic research, and industry matchmaking, featuring events such as lectures, international forums, book signings, IP releases, project signings, and a call for submissions from young creators. It not only provides an important exchange platform for Chinese science fiction literature and industry but also promotes the deep integration of science fiction culture with science and technology, cultural tourism, and creative industries. With Chengdu being hailed as the "Science Fiction Capital," the convention plays a positive role in enhancing the international influence of Chinese science fiction, cultivating young creators, and promoting the industrialization of science fiction IPs.

== History ==
=== The First Galaxy Awards Ceremony ===
The First Galaxy Awards Ceremony was held on 15 May 1986, in Chengdu, Sichuan Province, China. It was the award ceremony for the Galaxy Award (then known as the "China Science Fiction Galaxy Awards"), China's first national science fiction literary award. The award was jointly sponsored by the journals Science and Literature and Wisdom Tree, marking the resurgence of contemporary Chinese science fiction literature after a period of decline and considered one of the symbols of the dawn of Chinese science fiction literature.

=== 1991 Chengdu World SF Conference ===
The 1991 Chengdu World SF Conference was held in Chengdu on 20 May 1991. It was the first World SF conference held in China. Organized by the magazine Science Fiction World, the conference's theme was "Science Fiction, Peace, Friendship," symbolizing a significant step forward for Chinese science fiction literature on the international stage.

=== Beijing International Science Fiction Convention ===
The Beijing International Science Fiction Convention, also known as the 1997 Beijing Science Fiction Annual Convention, was held on 28 July 1997, at the China Science and Technology Hall in Beijing, China. It was hosted by the China Association for Science and Technology and co-organized by the Sichuan Provincial Association for Science and Technology, the Sichuan Provincial People's Association for Friendship with Foreign Countries, and the Science Fiction World magazine. The convention brought together science fiction writers, illustrators, editors, and astronauts from home and abroad to discuss the integration of science fiction creation and scientific development, and to promote Sino-foreign science fiction exchange.
