= Roc Chen =

Chinese composer (born 1984)

- Born: Chen Kun; 1984 (age 41–42); Chengdu, Sichuan, China
- Other name: Roc Chen
- Children: 1
- Musical career
- Genres: Film scores; Soundtracks
- Occupation: Composer
- Instruments: Piano; Keyboards
- Years active: 2012–present

Roc Chen (Chinese: 陈鲲; pinyin: Chén Kūn; born 1984), also named Chen Kun, is a Chinese composer and a member of the Chinese Musicians Association. Born in Chengdu, Sichuan, he is best known for composing the scores for the documentary A Bite of China, the TV series Red Sorghum, for the film series The Wandering Earth and the blockbuster film Ne Zha 2.

== Biography ==
Chen spent part of his childhood in Zigong. He began studying music at the age of four. He later attended the University of Electronic Science and Technology of China and the Sichuan Conservatory of Music, where he earned a master's degree in composition. He also studied under the composer Professor Song Mingzhu. In 2022, he served as an award presenter at the closing ceremony and awards ceremony of the 17th Changchun Film Festival in China. In 2023, the Chengdu World Science Fiction Convention appointed him as the promotional ambassador.

== Compositions ==
Roc Chen's work in film and television is characterised by a fusion of traditional Chinese musical elements with modern orchestral techniques. In television scoring, his work on the series Red Sorghum is notable for its incorporation of the suona, a traditional Chinese wind instrument with a distinctively piercing tone. In the science fiction film The Wandering Earth, Chen collaborated with the British Royal Philharmonic Orchestra and recorded the score at the Abbey Road Studios, formerly the EMI Recording Studios, in London.

In the film Ne Zha 2, Chen blended modern cinematic scoring with traditional sounds of Tuvan throat singing (Khoomei) alongside classical Chinese instruments such as the two-stringed erhu and ceramic xun for a distinctively Chinese modern soundtrack.

== Personal life ==
Chen's mother was an English teacher at Shuguang Middle School. He has one daughter.

== Discography ==
=== Film ===
Year	Title	Notes
2012	CZ12	Score
2014	The Legend of Qin	Score
2018	Kung Fu League	Score
2019	The Wandering Earth	Score
2019	Boonie Bears: Blast Into the Past	Score
2021	Boonie Bears: The Wild Life	Score
2023	The Wandering Earth 2	Score
2024	Formed Police Unit	Score
2024	Into the Mortal World	Score
2025	Ne Zha 2	Score
2026	Pegasus 3	Score

=== Television ===
Year	Title	Notes
2014	Red Sorghum	Score and theme song "Jiuer"
2015	The Legend of Mi Yue	Ending theme "As Beautiful as a Dream"
2015	Hua Xu Yin: City of Desperate Love	Score
2018	Dagger Mastery	Score
2018	Ever Night	Score
2018	When We Were Young	Score
2019	The Legend of Haolan	Score
2019	Royal Nirvana	Score
2019	Please Give Me a Pair of Wings	Score
2020	Handsome Siblings	Score
2020	The Awakening Age	Score
2022	Love Between Fairy and Devil	Score
2022	A Dream of Splendor	Score
2023	Game Changer	Score
2023	Flight To You	Score
2023	Rising With the Wind	Score
2024	Fox Spirit Matchmaker: Red-Moon Pact	Score
2026	A Winter Sun Wakes the Wind in Spring Hills' Dream	Ending theme "Filled Pages"

=== Documentary ===
Year	Title	Notes
2012	A Bite of China	Score
2018	Once Upon a Bite	Score
2020	Once Upon a Bite: Season 2	Score
2022	Once Upon a Bite: Season 4	Score
