= Sun of China =

2002 short story by Liu Cixin

- Short story by Liu Cixin
- Country: China
- Language: Chinese
- Genre: Science fiction

Publication
- Published in: Science Fiction World
- Publication type: Periodical
- Media type: Print
- Publication date: January 2002

"Sun of China" (Chinese: 中国太阳; pinyin: zhōngguó tàiyáng) is a science-fiction short story by Chinese writer Liu Cixin, first published in Science Fiction World in Chengdu in Sichuan Province in January 2002. The short story was included in the collection The Wandering Earth published by Head of Zeus in October 2017.

== Plot ==
The story revolves around Shuiwa, a rural young man with an elementary education who is recruited for a space mission.

Shui Wah works as a shoe cleaner in the rural province of China. His roommate Lu Hai has developed a new nanofabric and hopes to earn a lot of money by a possible application for solar cookers. When the television reports about the "Sun of China", a giant solar mirror in orbit to promote rain in rural areas, Lu Hai wants to move to Beijing in hope of an even bigger breakthrough with his nanofabric. Shui Wah wants give him company and journeys with Lu Hai to Beijing. Once there, they go their separate ways and Shui Wah, while wondering what to do next, notices little dots on a building and learns that they are window cleaners. One of the managers noticed Shui Wah watching these people an approached him to offer him the job as a window cleaner for skyscrapers, which actually was a job that paid good money due to its dangerous nature and lack of workers. A few years later, the Sun of China is in orbit, but is slowly being covered by cosmic dust. Lu Hai contacts Shui Wah to take on the necessary work as a mirror cleaner for six months. From now on, Shui Wah lives on the Sun of China and befriends Stephen Hawking, who has reached a hundred years of age and is living there. Twenty years later, there are far more advanced technologies for manipulating the weather and the Sun of China is abandoned. Lu Hai, now Minister of Space Industry, wants to shoot the mirror, which is too big to burn up in the Earth's atmosphere, into the sun's orbit. Shui Wah instead suggests converting it into an interstellar spaceship, powered by the sun's radiation pressure. Shui Wah then begins the long journey together with other people, still thinking of his home in China.

== Translations ==
"Sun of China" was also translated in German (2019) and Spanish (2019).

== Reception ==
=== Reviews ===
Alexis Ong wrote in the Reactor Magazine, that the short story "starts off with an engaging, semi-allegorical tale", but then "stumbles into an overly heavy-handed look at class politics that were already there and didn't need to be extra-spelled out." By the end, the "narrative momentum dissolves into a generic resolution that repeats old beats."

Jaymee Goh wrote on Strange Horizons, that "in stories such as 'Sun of China' and 'With Her Eyes,' the expository paragraphs deliver hard-hitting emotional landings that are deeply moving." In particular for "Sun of China", she remarks that it is nonetheless "the standout, for its sweetness" due to "its depiction of the poetic universality of human curiosity and ambition" and since "in each chapter of the story, Liu broadens the vision of his protagonist wider and wider". At the end, "the final exchange between Shui and his parents is especially moving."

Liz Comesky wrote on International Examiner, that the short story "explores what careers might be found and needed as humanity looks to the stars, and what role the common man might have in this future."

Academic Wang Hongzhe writes that the story reflects Chinese views of technological issues of politics and labor.

=== Awards ===
"The Sun of China" won the Galaxy Award in 2002.
