= Curse 5.0 =

2010 short story by Liu Cixin

- Short story by Liu Cixin
- Country: China
- Language: Chinese
- Genre: Science fiction

Publication
- Publication date: 2010

"Curse 5.0" (Chinese: 太原之恋 /太原诅咒; pinyin: tàiyuán zhīliàn/tàiyuán zǔzhòu) is a science-fiction short story by Chinese writer Liu Cixin, first published in 2010. The short story was included in the collection The Wandering Earth published by Head of Zeus in October 2017.

== Plot ==
On December 8, 2009, Curse 1.0 was created during the financial crisis as a tool for a programmer to drag the reputation of her ex-boyfriend Sa Bi into the mud. Shortly afterwards, science fiction writer Liu Cixin is in Taiyuan for a business trip and meets fantasy writer Pan Dajiao by chance. Together, they plan an epic story to be written in their different styles. Ten years later, Curse 1.0 is found by internet archaeologists and updated to Curse 2.0. Liu Cixin and Pan Dajiao are now homeless and fighting over discarded instant noodles. In the end, their Decalogy of Three Thousand Suns for men and Song of the Ninety Thousand Worlds for women were of no interest to anyone. Fortunately, this pushed their lives as far away from technology as possible. Seven years later, Curse 2.0 is updated to Curse 3.0 by a programmer who is also hurt because of a relationship and intends to cause real harm to Sa Bi in the world completely saturated with technology, who then simply changes his first and last name. Liu Cixin and Pan Dajiao happen to find her discarded laptop, delete all of its parameters and replace them with "*", which allows any input, in order to take revenge on their former readers. However, both argue too violently about gender and the police intervene. Curse 3.0 is thus updated to Curse 4.0, but Liu Cixin and Pan Dajiao forgot the parameters "Taiyuan, Shanxi, China" for the location. Taiyuan is then completely reduced to rubble by the technology present everywhere and thousands of people die. Liu Cixin is shocked and Pan Dajiao is delighted, both now want to change their genre as writers and their depiction of destruction. Ironically, Sa Bi survives the catastrophe, as he has stayed away from the internet all these years because of the curses. In the office of the Artificial Intelligence Security Agency, Curse 4.0 is then updated to Curse 5.0. The parameters for the location are now "*,*,*".

== Translations ==
"Curse 5.0" was also translated into German (2019) and Spanish (2019).

== Reviews ==
Publishers Weekly wrote that the short story "pokes fun at Liu's own sci-fi ambitions."

Alexis Ong wrote in the Reactor Magazine, that the short story "barrels out of nowhere to become an instant favorite" since it is "a completely deranged, snort-out-loud funny tale of cybercrimes and personal revenge where Liu inserts a hilariously debauched caricature of himself." Arguing that "the eponymous curse grows larger and more complex, poking fun at the sci-fi publishing complex, and adding masterful layers to a modern classic" it is "pure distilled genius."

Jaymee Goh wrote on Strange Horizons, that the short story has a "comedic effect", whose "ridiculousness lies in throwaway lines that parody various pulp fiction tropes and escalating tweaks to the code."

Liz Comesky wrote on International Examiner, that the short story "seems [....] to be a cautionary tale of the dangers posed as technology increases and more and more is controlled by computers and machines."
