= Khalid Ghanem =

Moroccan actor based in China

- خالد غانم; 哈立德·加纳姆
- Born: 21 January 1997 (age 29); Agadir, Morocco
- Occupations: Actor, martial artist, stunt performer
- Years active: 2018–present
- Known for: The Wandering Earth II (2023); Home Coming (2022); Feng Qi Ci Tong Cheng (2026)

Khalid Ghanem (Arabic: خالد غانم; Chinese: 哈立德·加纳姆; born 21 January 1997) is a Moroccan actor, martial artist, and stunt performer based in Beijing, China. He is known for his roles in Chinese film and television productions including Home Coming (2022) and The Wandering Earth II (2023), and for portraying the 14th-century Moroccan explorer Ibn Battuta in the 2026 series Feng Qi Ci Tong Cheng (French title: La Cité Étoilée de Citong).

== Early life ==
Ghanem was born and raised in Agadir, Morocco. Before pursuing an acting career, he trained in martial arts and competed as a national karate champion in Morocco. In 2018, he relocated to Beijing, China, to enter the Chinese film and television industry. He speaks Arabic, French, English, and Mandarin Chinese.

== Career ==
Following his arrival in China, Ghanem began working as an action actor and stunt performer in domestic film and television productions. He portrayed a foreign military officer in the historical television drama Across the Yalu River (2020) and worked on the war epic The Battle at Lake Changjin (2021) as well as the drama series Hello, The Sharpshooter (2022) and the action film Vanguard (2020).

In 2022, Ghanem appeared in Rao Xiaozhi's diplomatic thriller film Home Coming. In 2023, he played a coalition tower commander in Frant Gwo's science fiction film The Wandering Earth II and appeared in the crime action thriller Wolf Hiding. That same year, he received the Best Newcomer Award at the Global Variety Show Festival.

In 2026, Ghanem starred in the leading role of the medieval Moroccan traveler Ibn Battuta alongside actor Liu Xiaoxu in the iQIYI historical mystery series Feng Qi Ci Tong Cheng (Chinese: 风起刺桐城; La Cité Étoilée de Citong), filmed on location in Quanzhou, Fujian. In September 2026, he participated as a guest speaker at the 2026 Beijing Culture Forum, addressing Sino-Arab cultural exchange along the Maritime Silk Road.

== Filmography ==
=== Film ===
Year	Title	Chinese title	Role	Notes
2020	Vanguard	急先锋	Stunt / Action cast	
2021	The Battle at Lake Changjin	长津湖	Stunt performer	
2022	Home Coming	万里归途	Foreign cast	
2023	The Wandering Earth II	流浪地球2	Tower Commander	
2023	Wolf Hiding	怒潮	Actor / Stunt team	

=== Television ===
Year	Title	Chinese title	Role	Notes
2020	Across the Yalu River	跨过鸭绿江	Major	
2022	Hello, The Sharpshooter	你好，神枪手	Supporting role	
2026	Feng Qi Ci Tong Cheng	风起刺桐城	Ibn Battuta	Lead role (iQIYI)

== Filmography ==
=== Film ===
- DaHaiGang (2025) – Kavala
- Shattered Remedy (2024) – Miles
- Wolf Hiding (2023) – Mexican
- The Wandering Earth II (2023) – Tower Commander
- Home Coming (2022) – Wounded Soldier

=== Television ===
- Wind Rises in Tongcheng (2026) – Ibn Battuta
- Hello, the Sharpshooter (2022) – Bashakan
- Stride Across the Yalu River (2021) – Major
- Hami Wlad Aami (2019) – Employee (voice)
