= Home Coming (2022 film) =

- Theatrical release poster
- Traditional Chinese: 萬里歸途
- Simplified Chinese: 万里归途
- Hanyu Pinyin: Wànlǐ Guītú
- Directed by: Rao Xiaozhi; Frant Gwo
- Written by: Qin Haiyan; Shi Ce; Lei Zhilong; Bu Jingwei
- Produced by: Guo Fan; Wang Hongwei
- Starring: Zhang Yi; Wang Junkai; Yin Tao
- Cinematography: Yi Liao
- Edited by: God Ye
- Music by: Hank Lee
- Production companies: Shanghai Huace Film; Shenzhen Yiyi Yiyi Culture Media; G!Film Studio (Beijing); Beijing Free Whale Pictures
- Release date: 30 September 2022
- Running time: 137 minutes
- Country: China
- Languages: Mandarin; Arabic
- Box office: $236 million

Home Coming (Chinese: 万里归途) is a 2022 Chinese war drama film directed by Rao Xiaozhi, starring Zhang Yi, Wang Junkai and Yin Tao. The film, inspired by the evacuation of Chinese nationals during the 2011 Libyan Civil War, follows two unarmed Chinese diplomats who venture into a rebel-controlled area of the fictional, war-torn Republic of Numea to lead 125 Chinese citizens safely back to China.

Home Coming was theatrically released in China on September 30, 2022.

== Plot ==
In 2015, civil unrest erupted in the North African Republic of Numea. Former resident diplomat Zong Dawei and new Foreign Ministry officer Cheng Lang were ordered to assist in the evacuation of Chinese nationals. Thinking their mission was a success, they learned that a group of compatriots, led by Bai Huan, were still en route to the border with Numea, trapped in the conflict zone, awaiting rescue. Faced with this dire situation, the two resolutely disobeyed orders and set out to help. Unarmed, they led their men across the desert, navigating the war zone and outsmarting the rebels at gunpoint. They vowed to bring their compatriots back to their homeland.

== Cast ==
- Zhang Yi as Zong Dawei
- Wang Junkai as Cheng Lang
- Yin Tao as Bai Hua
- Wang Xun as Liu Minghui
- Li Xuejian as the Chinese ambassador
- Cheng Taishen as Yan Xingzhou, Chinese counsellor.
- Zhang Zixian as Secretary
- Wan Qian as Chen Yue
- Khalid Ghanem
- Li Chen
- Wang Zhi
- Chen Haoyu

== Production ==
Production started in April 2022 and ended on August 23. The Republic of Numea, a war-wrecked African country, was constructed in Yinchuan, capital of northwest China's Ningxia Hui Autonomous Region.

== Soundtrack ==
| No. | Title | Lyrics | Music | Singer(s) | Length |
|---|---|---|---|---|---|
| 1. | "It's Windy on the Way Home (归途有风)" (Ending theme) | Tang Tian | Qian Lei | Faye Wong |
| 2. | "Home Coming(万里归途)" (Movie promotion song) | | Tang Hanxiao | Wang Junkai |

== Release ==
Home Coming was theatrically released on 30 September 2022 in China.
