= The Micro-Era =

2001 short story by Liu Cixin

- Short story by Liu Cixin
- Country: China
- Language: Chinese
- Genre: Science fiction

Publication
- Publication date: April 2001

"The Micro-Era" (Chinese: 微纪元; pinyin: wēi jìyuán) is a science-fiction short story by Chinese writer Liu Cixin, first published in April 2001. The short story was included in the collection The Wandering Earth published by Head of Zeus in October 2017.

== Plot ==
The protagonist returns to the Solar System after a long but unsuccessful interstellar mission in search of a new home planet for humanity. However, the sun has already released the helium flash that caused the mission and turned the Earth into an endless wasteland. The protagonist lands and discovers small domes in which tiny people live. They then show and explain to him their world, in which they can jump from their own buildings or keep bacteria as pets. Over many generations, part of humanity was shrunk to its current size because of the impending crisis. Ultimately, a war broke out between macro and micro humans, which the latter cruelly won with the help of micro technology (such as burning optic nerves to cause blindness). The helium flash then wiped out the macro humans for good and the micro humans built up a new civilization (including sending golf ball-sized spaceships to Venus). The protagonist then shows the micro humans his spaceship and both parties are thrilled with each other. The protagonist suddenly realizes the only threat to the perfect microworld and burns all the frozen macroembryos.

== Translations ==
"The Micro-Era" was also translated into German (2019), Korean (2019) and Spanish (2019).

== Background ==
In 2012, China Film Group bought the rights to three of Liu Cixin's best-known science fiction stories, The Wandering Earth, Supernova Era and The Micro-Age. The plan to turn The Wandering Earth into a film was first announced at China Film Group's 2014 film project promotion conference. In the middle of 2015, China Film Production Branch found Frant Gwo, to discuss the cooperation intention. Gwo replied that he was particularly interested in making science fiction films, but Supernova Era and The Micro-Age were technically more demanding and set in a more distant time.

== Reviews ==
Jaymee Goh wrote on Strange Horizons, that the "expository paragraphs [....] are particularly tedious in first contact stories such as 'Mountain,' 'Devourer,' and 'The Micro Era,' where there is barely any human drama and the protagonists are flat."

Gareth D Jones wrote on SF Crowsnest, to wonder "if it's a Chinese habit or whether it is Cixin Liu's own penchant for giving every period of history a defining name as an Era."
