= The Wandering Earth =

2019 Chinese science fiction film directed by Frant Gwo

- Theatrical release poster
- Chinese: 流浪地球
- Hanyu Pinyin: Liú Làng Dì Qiú
- Directed by: Frant Gwo
- Written by: Gong Ge'er; Yan Dongxu; Frant Gwo; Ye Junce; Yang Zhixue; Wu Yi; Ye Ruchang
- Based on: "The Wandering Earth" (Chinese: 流浪地球) by Liu Cixin
- Produced by: Liu Cixin; Gong Ge'er
- Starring: Wu Jing; Qu Chuxiao; Li Guangjie; Ng Man-tat; Zhao Jinmai; Qu Jingjing
- Cinematography: Michael Liu
- Edited by: Cheung Ka-fai
- Music by: Roc Chen; Liu Tao (additional music)
- Production company: China Film Group Corporation
- Distributed by: China Film Group Corporation; Netflix (International)
- Release date: 5 February 2019
- Running time: 125 minutes
- Country: China
- Language: Mandarin
- Budget: $50 million
- Box office: Est. $700 million

The Wandering Earth (Chinese: 流浪地球; pinyin: liúlàng dìqiú) is a 2019 Chinese science fiction film directed by Frant Gwo, loosely based on the 2000 short story of the same name by Liu Cixin. The film stars Wu Jing, Qu Chuxiao, Li Guangjie, Ng Man-tat, Zhao Jinmai and Qu Jingjing. Set in the far future, it follows a group of astronauts and rescue workers guiding the Earth away from an expanding Sun, while attempting to prevent a collision with Jupiter. The film was theatrically released in China on 5 February 2019 (Chinese New Year's Day), by China Film Group Corporation.

The film grossed $701 million worldwide. It is China's sixth highest-grossing film of all time and the seventh highest-grossing non-English film to date. It has received generally positive reviews from critics, with The Hollywood Reporter describing it as "China's first full-scale interstellar spectacular." Netflix acquired the film's global streaming rights and began streaming outside China on 30 April 2019. A second film, The Wandering Earth 2, was released in January 2023, serving as a prequel.

== Plot ==
In the year 2058, an anomalously expanding red giant Sun threatens to engulf the Earth within 100 years. Under a world government, humanity has constructed 10,000 enormous fusion-powered "Earth Engines" to thrust Earth out of the Solar System and move it into a new orbit around Alpha Centauri. Before his mission aboard the Navigation Platform International Space Station, Chinese astronaut Liu Peiqiang leaves his son Qi in the care of his father-in-law Han Zi'ang. Half of humanity, mostly chosen by lottery, moves underground; the others die from the cold and cataclysms resulting from the halt of the Earth's rotation as the planet is thrust out of its orbit around the Sun.

Seventeen years later, Peiqiang is about to return to Earth after the Chinese New Year. Qi, now an adult, obtains fake IDs and stolen thermal suits from criminal gangs and uses his grandfather's clearance pass to bring his foster sister, Han Duoduo, to tour the surface. Both are arrested at a checkpoint and meet another prisoner, Tim. Zi'ang is also arrested as he attempts to bribe for his grandchildren's release. As Earth approaches its gravity assist around Jupiter, a gravitation spike from Jupiter causes devastating earthquakes that disable many Earth Engines and sets the planet on a collision course with Jupiter.

The four escape in the collapse and attempt to make their way to another underground city, but their truck is requisitioned for an emergency mission led by Captain Wang Lei to transport a Lighter Core to restart an Earth Engine in Hangzhou. In the frozen ruins of Shanghai, they lose their vehicle while transporting the component up the ruins of the Shanghai Tower, where Han Zi'ang freezes to death. After confronting the other rescue team members, Qi, Tim and Han Duoduo abandon the mission. The trio come upon a crashed cargo plane with an intact vehicle, where the surviving engineer aboard, Li Yiyi, eventually convinces them to transport another Lighter Core to repair the Earth Engine in Sulawesi, reconciling with the other members, whom arrived following the Hangzhou Engine's destruction.

Aboard the space station, Peiqiang discovers that MOSS, the station's computer commander, has decided to abandon Earth and repurpose the station as an interstellar ark to seed a new planet with Earth's biosphere. Breaking out of forced hibernation, he is joined by fellow Russian cosmonaut Maxim Makarov, whom MOSS awakens to stop Liu. While spacewalking, Makarov is killed by the spacecraft's automated security measures. Liu enters the control room, but his attempts to override the evacuation procedures are revoked. Qi's group arrives at the Sulawesi Supply Depot to find that, while most engines around the planet have been restored, the combined thrust is insufficient to divert Earth's trajectory as it approaches Jupiter's Roche limit. MOSS broadcasts a final message to the world, but Peiqiang refuses to follow the computer's instructions.

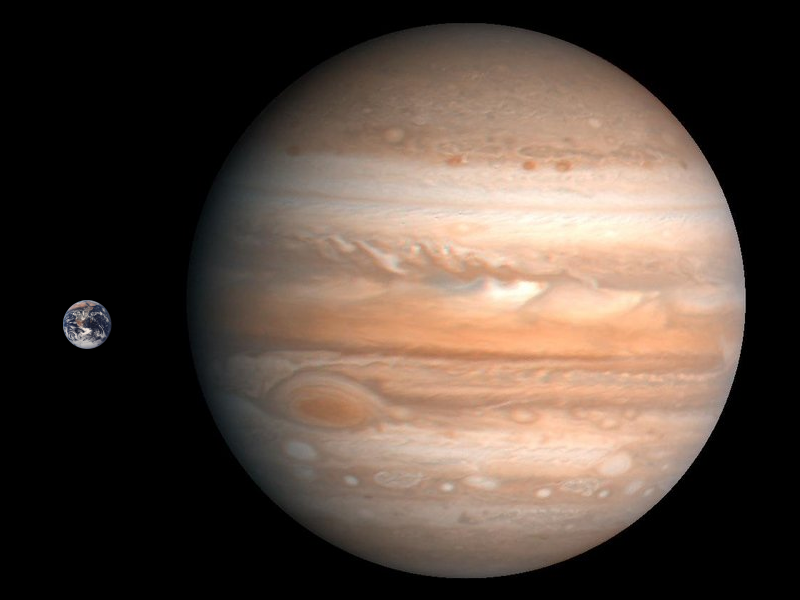
Approximate size comparison: Jupiter's strong gravitational pull wreaks havoc on the Earth throughout the film.

As Jupiter begins to siphon Earth's atmosphere, Qi proposes to ignite the oxygenated mixture of the two planets’ gases, which will cause a shockwave to knock Earth back into its regular path away from Jupiter. Yiyi configures the Sulawesi engine to fire a plasma beam tall enough to ignite Jupiter, but the group is unable to push the firing pin and ignite the engine. Contacted by Duoduo, Peiqiang is able to persuade the UEG to use its communication channels to call assistance for the party at Sulawesi despite MOSS' doubts. While other rescue parties manage to ignite multiple engines, they are unable to ignite the hydrogen. After starting a fire to disable MOSS, Peiqiang pilots the space station into the plasma jet, tearfully apologizing to his son for breaking his promise to return before sacrificing himself to ignite the mix of atmospheres. The subsequent explosion narrowly saves Earth from destruction.

Three years later, Qi, Duoduo, and Yiyi work as truck operators, as Earth continues towards the Alpha Centauri star system.

== Cast ==
- Wu Jing as Liu Peiqiang (刘培强)
- Qu Chuxiao as Liu Qi (刘启)
- Li Guangjie as Captain Wang Lei (王磊)
- Ng Man-tat as Han Zi'ang (韩子昂)
- Zhao Jinmai as Han Duoduo (韩朵朵)
- Arkady Sharogradsky as Makarov
- Mike Sui as Tim
- Qu Jingjing as Zhou Qian (周倩)
- Zhang Yichi as Li Yiyi (李一一)
- Yang Haoyu as He Lianke (何连科)
- Li Hongchen as Zhang Xiaoqiang (张小强)
- Yang Yi as Yang Jie (杨捷)
- Jiang Zhigang as Zhao Zhigang (赵志刚)
- Zhang Huan as Huang Ming (黄明)
- Lei Jiayin as Yi Ge

== Production ==
=== Development ===
"China's film market cannot always be filled with European and American science fiction films. Filling the gap is a gamble, but China cannot remain absent."

— Producer of the film The Wandering Earth and then Chairman of China Film Co., Ltd. [La Peikang]，China Film Journal，15 February 2019

In 2012, China Film Group bought the rights to three of Liu Cixin's best-known science fiction novels, The Wandering Earth, Supernova Era and The Micro-Era. The plan to turn The Wandering Earth into a film was first announced at China Film Group's 2014 film project promotion conference, which estimated the production cost would be $50 million. In the middle of 2015, China Film Production Branch found Frant Gwo, to discuss the cooperation intention. Gwo replied that he was particularly interested in making science fiction films, but Supernova Era and The Micro-Age were technically more demanding and set in a more distant time, Frant Gwo chose The Wandering Earth. He thinks the technical extension of "The Wandering Earth" makes it easy to empathize with viewers. Frant Gwo was a big fan of the science fiction genre and was first influenced by James Cameron's Terminator 2: Judgment Day which inspired him to become a director in the genre. He spent the following years studying the genre to direct a science fiction film. In the middle of July 2016, The Wandering Earth was officially approved in the script filing of National Radio and Television Administration, and confirmed by Frant Gwo to direct.

=== Pre-production ===
In the pre-production stage, Frant Gwo first considered the center of gravity of the movie and the relationship with the original. Considering that "[from] the novel we can choose different perspectives, such as Liu Cixin often chooses God's perspective, the perspective of the universe, the timeline is very grand, crossing thousands of years. But the movie is hard to express this, If the movie spends two hours to express the detailed world view, it will become a scientific film." He believed that the film could only take the novel story as the background, and must focus on the characters and emotions of the story. Based on this, the crew began to consider which part of the original book would be more suitable for the film background. For this Frant Gwo emphasizes that for "the presentation of the movie needs, you must find a comparison that makes the audience feel very interesting, or can have a visual impact." In the end he decided to use Jupiter's accelerating gravity to precipitate the Earth into crisis, and for humans to use solidarity and wisdom to protect it as the setting, and to completely adapt the story, which is only about five paragraphs in the original book. Jupiter was chosen precisely for its visual impact: Earth is huge for humans, but becomes very small and fragile when compared with Jupiter, which is more than 1,300 times larger.

After confirming Jupiter's background the crew began to consider a world view, which was the most difficult part of Kuo Fan's preparatory work. The whole world outlook of the set took about eight months, from the social aspect of politics, economics, culture, education, entertainment, and food production, to natural levels of physical environment change in the Earth, how to escape the sun, the cast, and the relationship between all of these relevant aspects. In order to establish a rigorous setting, Gwo invited 4 scientists from the Chinese Academy of Sciences (CAS) to act as consultants.

The crew also chronicled one hundred years of history, including the big events since 2017, to connect the real world and the movie world.

The film's 3,000 concept maps and more than 8,000 sub-mirrors were created by a conceptual art team of 300 people over a period of 15 months.

In 2017 Beijing Culture partnered with the project to complete the film, together with China Film Group as the main producer of the film. The Wandering Earth is the first film that is based on a novel written by Liu Cixin.

=== Filming ===
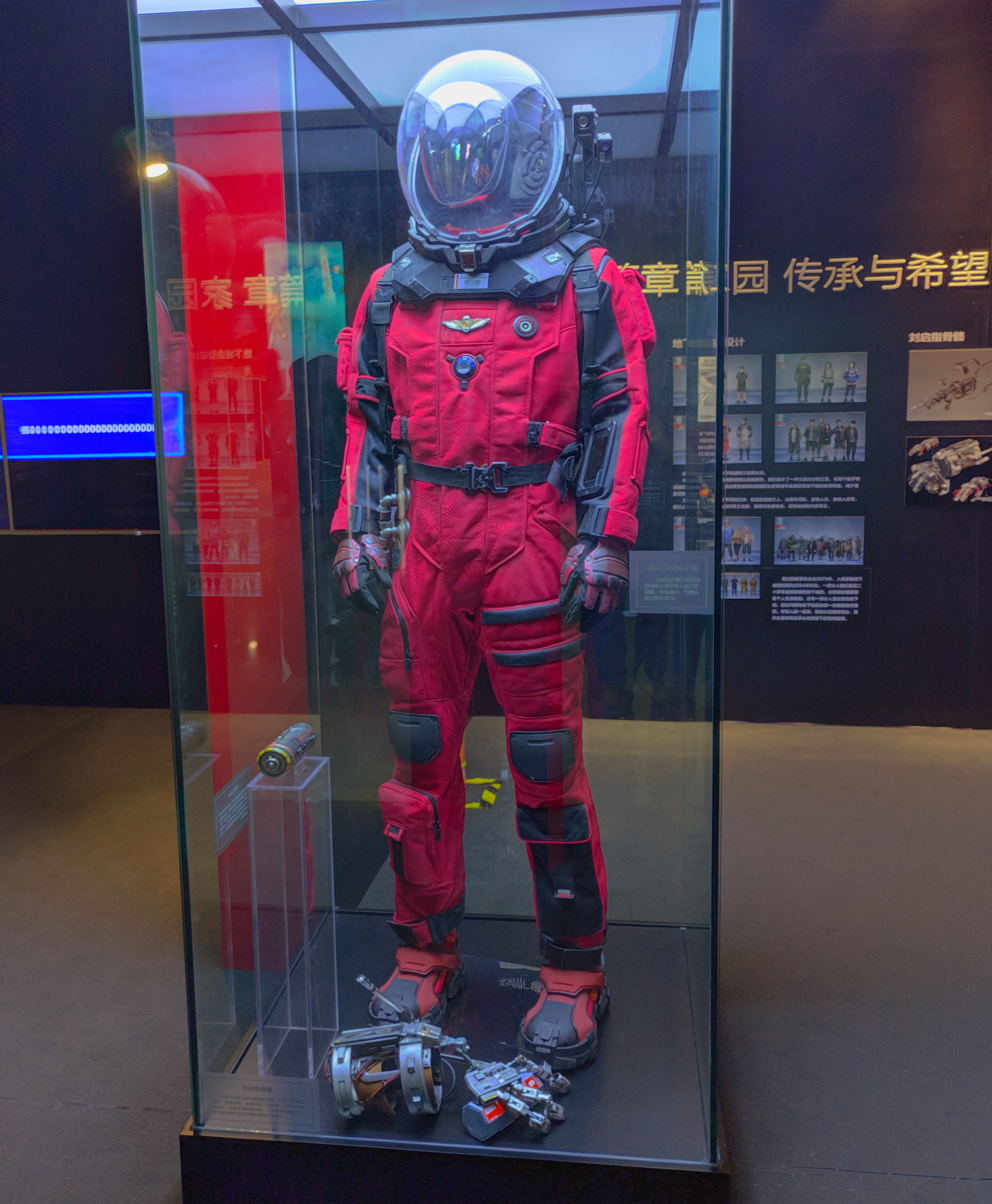
Spacesuit used in the film

Principal photography started on 26 May 2017, in Qingdao, a seaside city on north China's Shandong province, and wrapped on 27 September 2017. The crew of The Wandering Earth arrived at CMM in 2017, before the park was complete, and stayed for nearly a year, using eight sound stages. Weta Workshop made the film's spacesuits, exoskeletons and weaponry.

Wu Jing was asked by Frant Gwo to play a cameo role in the film, but was later cast in a leading role. When he was told that the production had run into financial trouble, he gave up his remuneration and invested in the film to help it continue, for which he was given special thanks in the credits of the film. Due to the financial difficulties, there was a limited remuneration budget, and the salary for the lead actor Qu Chuxiao was around 100,000 yuan (US$15,000).

=== Post-production ===
The visual effects of the film were made by Base FX, Bottleship VFX, Dexter Studios, Macrograph, More VFX, Pixomondo and Black Nomad.

Liu Cixin, the author of the original novella, said to China Central Television, "Chinese studios have no interest to invest in sci-fi films. US sci-fi film audiences have trust but this trust between audiences and China's sci-fi movies doesn't exist yet and this is the main difference between Chinese and US sci-fi films...It is a challenge because this trust must build between producers, investors, and the audience until people have faith in a Chinese sci-fi movie."

=== Music ===
The film's music was composed by Roc Chen (阿鯤), and Liu Tao (刘韬) as an additional composer. The film's music was performed by the British Royal Philharmonic Orchestra and conducted by Roc Chen at the Abbey Road Studios.

== Release ==
On 25 December 2018, the first official trailer for the film was released at the China Aerospace Museum in Beijing along with a teaser poster.

On 30 January 2019, Beijing-based distributor China Media Capital (CMC Pictures) announced that it has secured the international rights and is planning a sizable North American release on 8 February. The company will open the film in 22 cities in the U.S. and 3 in Canada, throughout Australia and New Zealand. The movie released in U.S. theaters with IMAX 3D during the first week.

On 20 February 2019, it was announced that Netflix acquired the distribution rights to stream the film internationally. The film was expected to be available to stream globally on Netflix, outside of China, on 30 April 2019, however the film was later promoted on the Netflix Facebook page as being released on 6 May 2019.

== Reception ==
=== Box office ===
The Wandering Earth was released over the Chinese New Year holiday season, and earned more than CN¥2 billion (£232 million) in 6 days, setting a new record for a Chinese film. It also set the record for the highest-grossing Chinese film on IMAX. Second weekend box office dropped 53%, on par with all other currently playing films post Chinese holiday season, as expected. The film's total gross in China stands at CN¥4.655 billion.

On release, it topped the worldwide box office with a 3-day opening weekend gross of $172,718,000, and had a 6-day opening gross of $289,090,290. The film has grossed $693,371,204 in China, $5,875,487 in North America, and $1,575,366 in other territories, for a worldwide total of $699,992,512.

=== Critical response ===
On Rotten Tomatoes, the film has an approval rating of 70% based on 40 reviews, with an average rating of 6.2/10. The website's critics consensus reads: "The Wandering Earth's story won't win many points for originality, but this sci-fi epic earns its thrills with exciting set pieces and dazzling special effects." On Metacritic the film has an average score of 57/100 based on reviews from 8 critics, indicating "mixed or average reviews".

The film received a generally positive reception in China. Several state-run media publications have given the film a positive review. Zhong Sheng in the People's Daily writes that the film is "not superheroes saving the world but mankind changing their destiny together."

Tasha Robinson of The Verge describes the film as "rich, gorgeous, and goofy". Travis Johnson, of Flicks.com.au gave the film 4/5 stars and, whilst criticizing the film for its lack of character development, praised the visuals and said it might be the best science fiction film of 2019. Ben Kenigsberg in The New York Times wrote that the film is "as awash in murky computer imagery, stupefying exposition and manipulative sentimentality as the average Hollywood tentpole", but that it proved that the Chinese film industry "can hold its own at the multiplex." Simon Abrams of RogerEbert.com gave the film 3.5/4 stars, saying that the experience was "visually dynamic, emotionally engaging".

Zhuoyi Wang, an associate professor at Hamilton College, lauded the film's attempt in presenting a unifying view of humanity that imagines humans from diverse backgrounds coming together to save the earth from a disaster. In contrast, the film's Hollywood counterparts often feature a group of individuals from a single country or a single social class. Despite its attempted departure from the exclusionist individualism prevalent in Hollywood, The Wandering Earth has nevertheless received support from Chinese state media for nationalist reasons, leading many to dismiss it as an instrument of Chinese propaganda or a Hollywood clone.

On Douban, during the initial release, the movie had a 8.5 rating; then suddenly fell to 7.9 as of the early morning of February 23 in China. It was claimed some reviewers were offered money for posting negative reviews on the rating platform. Douban banned nearly 50 users for violating guidelines and thousands of comments were removed. The rating finally stabilized at 7.9. Some commenters, specifically on Douban, who gave the film negative reviews were accused to be in bad faith or trolling, but the accusations are disputed.

=== Accolades ===
Li Guangjie won the Golden Angel for Best Actor in a Supporting Role at the 15th Chinese American Film Festival in Los Angeles.

The film won the Golden Rooster Award for Best Picture and Best Sound for 2019. It also won the Golden Oak Award for Best Film in New York City.

== Prequel ==
A prequel, The Wandering Earth 2, starring Andy Lau was announced for 2023 and began production in October 2021. The film was released on 22 January 2023.

== See also ==
- List of films featuring space stations
- Sun in fiction
- Moving Earth, the idea of physically moving Earth from one place to another.
- A World Out of Time, a 1976 novel by Larry Niven that also features an interaction between the Earth and Jupiter in an attempt to escape an expanding Sun
