= Alan Chong Lau =

American poet and artist (born 1948)

- Born: July 11, 1948 (age 78); Oroville, California, U.S.
- Education: University of California, Santa Cruz
- Occupation: Poet
- Writing career
- Genre: Poetry

Alan Chong Lau (born July 11, 1948) is an American poet and artist.

== Life ==
Lau was born in Oroville, California and grew up in Paradise, California. He graduated from the University of California, Santa Cruz with a B.A. in Art. He serves as Arts Editor for the International Examiner. His art is represented at ArtXchange Gallery. He lives in Seattle, Washington.

== Awards ==
- 1981 American Book Award
- Creative Artist Fellowship for Japan from the Japan-US Friendship Commission
- National Endowment for the Arts and the Agency for Cultural Affairs of the Japanese Government
- Artists Grant from Seattle Arts Commission
- Publications Grant from King County Arts Commission
- Special Projects Grant from the California Arts Council

== Works ==
- no hurry (Cash Machine, 2007)
- Blues and Greens: A Produce Worker's Journal. University of Hawai'i Press. 2000. ISBN 978-0-8248-2323-8.
- Songs For Jadina. Greenfield Review Press. 1980. ISBN 978-0-912678-43-6.
- Garrett Kaoru Hongo; Alan Chong Lau; Lawson Fusao Inada (1978). The Buddha Bandits Down Highway 99. Buddhahead Press.

=== Anthologies ===
- Ishmael Reed, ed. (2003). From Totems to Hip-Hop: A Multicultural Anthology of Poetry Across The Americas 1900-2002. Thunder's Mouth Press. ISBN 978-1-56025-458-4.
- Gary Gach, ed. (1998). What Book!? Buddha Poems From Beat to Hiphop. Parallax Press. ISBN 978-0-938077-92-3.
- Stan Yogi, ed. (1996). "2 Stops on the Way Home". Highway 99: a literary journey through California's Great Central Valley. Heyday Books. p. 386. ISBN 978-0-930588-82-3. "Alan Chong Lau."
