= Cannonball (short story) =

2003 short story by Liu Cixin

- Short story by Liu Cixin
- Country: China
- Language: Chinese
- Genre: Science fiction

Publication
- Published in: Science Fiction World
- Publication type: Periodical
- Media type: Print
- Publication date: September 2003

"Cannonball" (Chinese: 地球大炮; pinyin: dìqiú dàpào) is a science-fiction short story by Chinese writer Liu Cixin, first published in Science Fiction World in Chengdu in Sichuan Province in September 2003. The short story was included in the collection The Wandering Earth published by Head of Zeus in October 2017.

== Plot ==
Shen Huabei visits an underground cave with his son Shen Yuan and his wife Zhao Wenjia and shows them the progress in the construction of underground caves using nuclear explosions, as well as a material in a newly discovered solid state. Because Shen Huabei has leukemia, he will soon have to go into cryogenic sleep. However, Shen Yuan has decided to stay with Zhao Wenjia. Decades later, Shen Huabei awakens from cryogenic sleep and receives a letter from Zhao Wenjia, who tells him that she will have died by now and that Shen Yuan (who has also died by now) has committed extremely terrible acts. His doctor, the only person he can trust now, therefore gives Shen Huabei a new identity. While still in the hospital, a group kidnaps him, drags him through the city with a corrosive and stinking air to a deep hole and throws him inside. They explain the background to Shen Huabei over the radio during the endless fall. He inspired Shen Yuan to construct a tunnel through the entire Earth. Since Antarctica was the only continent that had not yet been exploited and interest in it was constantly growing, the tunnel was built with walls made of the material in a new solid state from Mohe in China to the easternmost point of the Antarctic Peninsula. The project turned out to be an extreme disaster. A research ship sank near the Earth's core, with only Shen Jing, Shen Yuan's daughter and Shen Huabei's granddaughter, surviving on board. There was also a central fracture catastrophe, in which magma shot up the tunnel from the Earth's interior. Shen Yuan ordered the closure of a safety valve that was located far too high up, leaving more than a thousand people to die below. Finally, there was the bolt loss catastrophe, in which a single loose bolt smashed the trains traveling in the tunnel due to the extremely high relative speed. Antarctica was then ruthlessly exploited, which completely destroyed the ozone layer. Shen Huabei, whose protective suit would have had no energy left for the return journey, is rescued in Antarctica. There he believes that Shen Yuan's life's work will not be forgotten, because all of humanity's major projects, such as the Pyramids of Giza or the Great Wall of China, were completely pointless. After another cryogenic sleep, which he is advised to take for safety reasons, he wants to see the tunnel through the Earth as a showcase project of a proud humanity.

Half a century later, Shen Huabei is awakened and travels through the tunnel again with a companion, but this time, after passing through the Earth's core, he accelerates into space using an electromagnetic catapult with the Earth's magnetic field. When Shen Huabei sees the Earth, he learns that his granddaughter Shen Jing was never found, but that recordings of what ultimately became of the project were sent to her in the Earth's core.

== Translations ==
"Cannonball" was also translated into German (2019), Korean (2019) and Spanish (2019).

== Reception ==
=== Reviews ===
Jaymee Goh wrote on Strange Horizons, that "despite the pages of historical exposition updating the main character on what has happened during his sleep, it is never quite clear how the rage of the society is justified, except as a search for a scapegoat."

Gareth D Jones wrote on SF Crowsnest, that "some of Cixin Liu's favourite themes return: a macro-engineering project scientifically explained but sprinkled with small-scale stories of how individuals were affected and a large-scale narrative of the effects on society." Still, "as usual, it finishes with a delicate balance of optimism and despair and rounds out the collection nicely."

=== Awards ===
"Cannonball" won the Galaxy Award in 2003.
