= World SF =

World SF is a loose term for international, or global, speculative fiction, predominantly from the non-Anglophone world. An early use of the term came with the establishment of World SF, an association of SF professionals in 1976. According to the third edition of the Encyclopedia of Science Fiction, the term was partly revived by the author Lavie Tidhar, leading to the establishment of the World SF Blog, which ran 2009-2013. Early on, the Filipino blogger Charles A. Tan became involved with the blog, contributing much of the original material - including interviews with authors, reviews and the occasional editorial, including the important World SF: Our Possible Future in 2012. Tan was himself twice nominated for the World Fantasy Award, for his own blog, Bibliophile Stalker, and has edited several anthologies of Filipino speculative fiction.

For his work on the promotion of global speculative fiction, Tidhar was nominated for a World Fantasy Award in 2011, and won a 2012 BSFA Award for Non-Fiction in 2012. The Polish SF scholar Konrad Walewski argued that "Tidhar deliberately utilized the term World SF as a specific act of disagreement and dissatisfaction with what he considered to be the gradual ossification of the original organization".

In parallel, Tidhar edited three anthologies of World SF, The Apex Book of World SF series, between 2009-2014. Significant authors featured in the series included Lauren Beukes (South Africa), Zoran Živković (Serbia), Aliette de Bodard (France), Hannu Rajaniemi (Finland), Xia Jia (China), Karin Tidbeck (Sweden), Guy Hasson (Israel), Tunku Halim (Malaysia), Samit Basu (India), Ekaterina Sedia (Russia) and many others. The series was continued in 2015 with a fourth volume edited by Mahvesh Murad, with Tidhar remaining as series editor. The series ended with a fifth volume edited by Cristina Jurado.

In 2021, Tidhar launched a new series of large hardback anthologies, The Best of World SF, which ran for three volumes.

World SF should not be confused with WorldCon which, despite its name, is a predominantly (though not exclusively) American institution.
