= Once Upon a Bite =

Chinese television documentary series

- 风味人间
- Genre: Documentary
- Country of origin: China
- Original language: Mandarin
- No. of seasons: 5
- No. of episodes: 37

Production
- Running time: 50 min.

Original release
- Network: Tencent Video
- Release: October 28, 2018 – present

Once Upon a Bite (Chinese: 风味人间) is a Chinese television documentary series about culinary arts that premiered on October 28, 2018, on Tencent Video. The series is directed by Chen Xiaoqing, the director of A Bite of China.

The first season premiered in 2018 consisted of 8 episodes.

The second season premiered on April 26, 2020, also consisted of 8 episodes.

The fifth season premiered on November 28, 2024, and the season consist of 7 episodes.

== Series overview ==
Season	Episodes	Originally aired	
Season	Episodes	First aired	Last aired
Season 1	8	October 28, 2018	December 16, 2018
Season 2	8	April 26, 2020	June 14, 2020
Season 3	8	December 19, 2021	
Season 4	6	November 24, 2022	
Season 5	7	November 28, 2024	

== Reception ==
Once Upon a Bite has received rave reviews from culinary enthusiasts and audiences. Some have praised the series as equal to or even surpassing Chen Xiaoqing's previous A Bite of China. The first season of Once Upon a Bite received a 9.0 out of 10 ratings on Douban with over a hundred thousand ratings. The second season received a 9.1 out of 10 ratings on Douban. The first season also accumulated over 1 billion streaming views on Tencent Video, a record for food documentaries.
