= Moving Earth =

Planetary engineering scenario

Moving Earth is a theoretical astroengineering concept that involves physically shifting Earth farther away from the Sun to protect the planet's biosphere from rising temperatures. These expected temperature increases derive from long-term impacts of the greenhouse effect combined with the Sun's nuclear fusion process and steadily increasing luminosity. The approach has been acknowledged by some planetary scientists, including some at Cornell University.

Various mechanisms have been proposed to accomplish the move. The most plausible method involves redirecting asteroids or comets roughly about 100 km wide via gravity assists around Earth's orbit and towards Jupiter or Saturn and back. The aim of this redirection would be to gradually move Earth away from the Sun, keeping it within a continuously habitable zone. This scenario has many practical drawbacks: besides the fact that it spans timescales far longer than human history, it would also put life on Earth at risk as the repeated encounters could cause Earth to potentially lose its Moon, severely disrupting Earth's climate and rotation. The trajectories of each encounter would need to minimize potential changes to the Earth's axial tilt and period of rotation. Lengthening the Earth's orbital period would also lengthen its seasons, potentially causing disruptions to life at higher and lower latitudes due to extended winter and summer months, as well as causing significant changes to global seasonal weather patterns. Additionally, the encounters would require said asteroids or comets to pass close to Earth; a slight miscalculation could cause an impact between the asteroid or comet and Earth, potentially ending most life on the planet.

== See also ==
- Astronomical engineering
- Future of Earth
- Planetary engineering
- The Wandering Earth – A film that uses this concept as its premise
- Crimes of the Hot, an episode of Futurama that involves this concept
