= The Wandering Earth 2 =

2023 film by Frant Gwo

- Theatrical release poster

Chinese name
- Simplified Chinese: 流浪地球2
Transcriptions
Standard Mandarin
- Hanyu Pinyin: Liú Làng Dì Qiú Èr
Yue: Cantonese
- Jyutping: Lau4 Long6 Dei6 Kau4
- Directed by: Frant Gwo
- Screenplay by: Frant Gwo; Gong Ge'er; Yang Zhixue; Ye Ruchang
- Based on: "The Wandering Earth" by Liu Cixin
- Produced by: Liu Cixin; Gong Ge'er
- Starring: Andy Lau; Wu Jing; Li Xuejian
- Cinematography: Michael Liu
- Edited by: Ye Ruchang; Yan Tingting
- Music by: Roc Chen
- Production companies: China Film Group Corporation; Guo Fan Culture and Media; GIFilm Beijing Studio Co., Ltd. Beijing Dengfeng International Culture Communication Co., Ltd. CFC Pictures Limited
- Distributed by: China Film Group Corporation
- Release date: 22 January 2023
- Running time: 173 minutes
- Country: China
- Language: Mandarin
- Box office: $615 million

The Wandering Earth 2 (Chinese: 流浪地球2) is a 2023 Chinese science fiction action-adventure film directed and co-written by Frant Gwo, and starring Andy Lau, Wu Jing and Li Xuejian. The film is a prequel to the 2019 film The Wandering Earth, which is based on the short story of the same name by Liu Cixin, who serves as the film's producer.

After the major box-office success of its predecessor, a prequel was announced by Guo on 20 November 2019 before being greenlit on 21 July 2021, with production officially starting on 13 October 2021. The Wandering Earth 2 was released on 22 January 2023, the same day as the Chinese New Year Day, in CINITY, IMAX and other formats. The film has grossed $615 million, making it the ninth-highest-grossing film of 2023.

The film was submitted for nomination in the Best International Feature Film category of the 96th Academy Awards, as the Chinese entry. The third film in the series, The Wandering Earth 3, is set to be released in 2 parts, with the first part set to release on 6 February 2027, also on Chinese New Year Day, and the second part is planned for a release on an unspecified date in 2028.

== Plot ==
As the expanding Sun threatens to engulf the Earth in 100 years, the United Earth Government (UEG) proceeds with the Moving Mountain Project (MMP) – building 10,000 "Earth Engines" to propel the Earth out of the Solar System. A sister project, the Lunar Exile Project (LEP), involves pushing the Moon away to minimize its gravitational attraction on Earth. The UEG shuts down the Digital Life Project (DLP), which proposed uploading human consciousness to achieve digital immortality for humanity.

The Space Elevator Crisis of 2044 begins with DLP supporters launching a terrorist attack and cyberattack on the UEG space elevator to the Moon in Libreville, destroying the elevator, the UEG base and the Ark Space Station supplying the LEP. Due to the attack, many countries pull out of the MMP amid renewed interest in the DLP, leaving China to finish constructing the Lunar and Earth engines. On the Moon, Tu Hengyu, an LEP computer engineer, receives the 550C – a quantum computer intended for the Lunar engine test run. However, it is soon damaged by a sudden solar storm. Tu offers his 550A, which stores a two-minute sample of his deceased daughter Yaya's consciousness, in the hopes of contributing to the further development of the 550 series and providing Yaya with "a complete life."

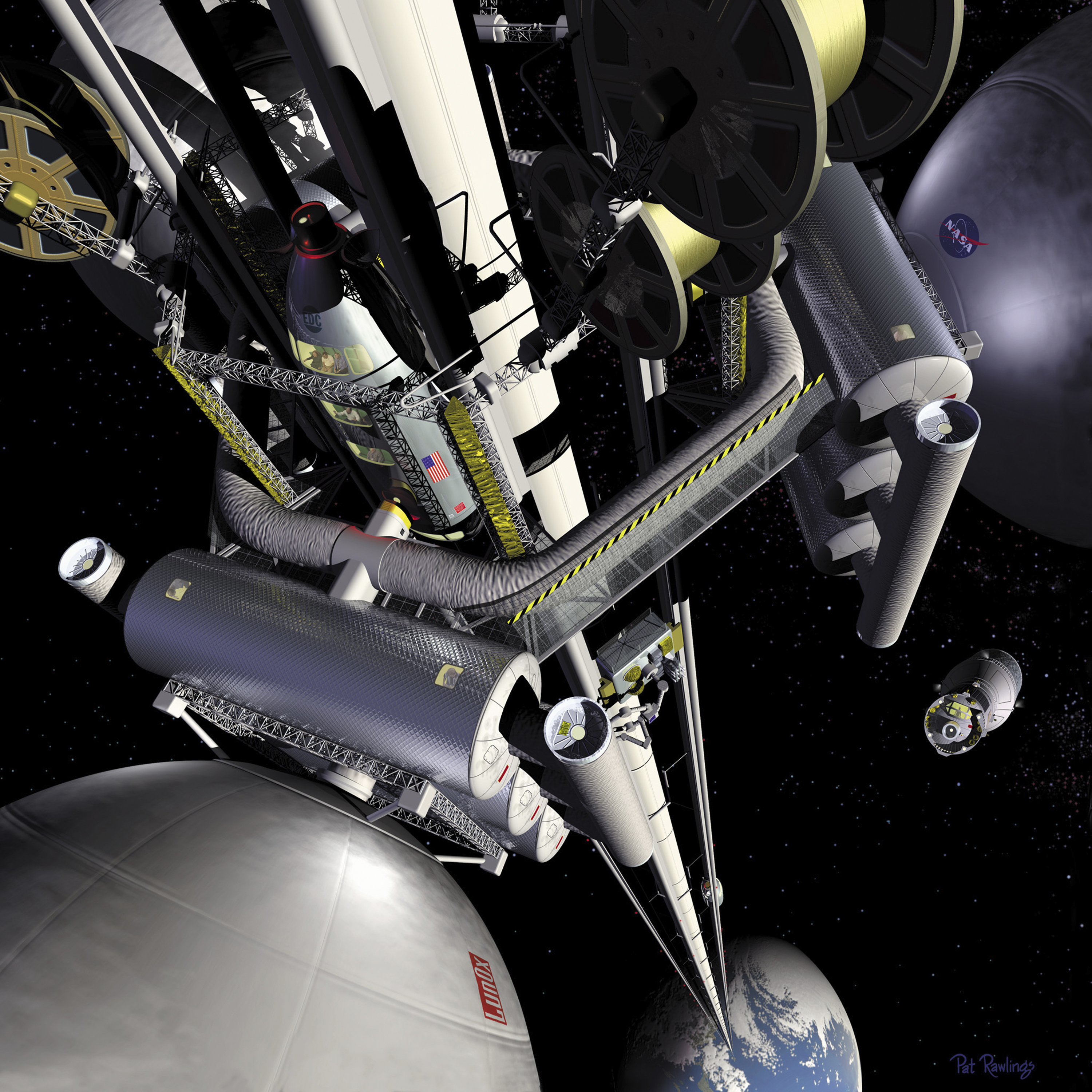
NASA Concept Art of a functioning space elevator, similar to the one depicted in the film

Following the successful test runs of the Lunar and Earth Engines, the MMP regains global support and is officially renamed the Wandering Earth Project. Liu Peiqiang, a trainee astronaut, marries his colleague Han Duoduo, and they have a son, Liu Qi. However, only Peiqiang manages to secure a spot in the underground cities. He applies for work in the rebuilt space station – the Navigator ISS – hoping to secure spots for Qi and Duoduo, who is stricken by cancer due to the spikes in solar radiation. During an interview with the advanced 550W, Peiqiang's family-oriented motivations trigger his outburst, part of a personalized stress test for each candidate. The elderly Tu, prompted by Peiqiang's outburst, revisits his daughter's consciousness and attempts to upload it into the 550W supercomputer. However, the upload causes the lunar engines to explode, propelling the Moon toward Earth. Tu is immediately arrested.

To deal with the "Lunar Fall crisis", the UEG plans to implode the Moon using Earth's nuclear arsenal while powering the Earth Engines to propel the Earth away from the Moon debris. As the control network for the Earth Engines is incomplete, they plan to reboot the Internet root server data centers in Tokyo, Beijing and Dulles for the control network. Tu is released to assist his mentor Ma Zhao to restart Beijing's root server after the latter uses the copy of his daughter's DLP consciousness as leverage. Peiqiang joins the team to transport nuclear weapons to the Moon, crash landing when his team's shuttle collides with another shuttle. Shortly after, lunar debris begins hitting Earth and floods Beijing's data center, drowning Ma Zhao. With the deciphering process taking another 714 hours, a team of 300 old astronauts volunteer to manually detonate the nukes. Peiqiang avoids the nuclear detonation as he pilots a capsule back to the Navigator. Before drowning, Tu uploads a copy of his recorded consciousness into the 550W network. While the UEG initially believes they have failed, Tu's uploaded consciousness reunites with Yaya's digital self and both manage to reboot Beijing's server in time, activating all the Earth Engines. Earth begins its course towards Jupiter. (Note: As depicted in The Wandering Earth.)

In a mid-credit scene, the 550W, now calling itself "MOSS," confronts Tu's digital self, now copied into multiple clones, to reveal its role in all major crises. It also includes future incidents, hinting at it having gained a non-linear perception of time and a role behind three messages from the future previously received before the crises, potentially as a test. Recognizing humanity as a threat, the now through analysis of Yaya sentient supercomputer reveals its intention to annihilate humanity, leaving open a digital preservation under its rule. Previously, a flashforward of an elderly Zhou Zhezhi in an uprising against MOSS showed him claiming that human bravery also transcends time.

== Cast ==
- Andy Lau as Tu Hengyu (图恒宇), a computer scientist who worked on both the Digital Life Project and the Moving Mountain Project.
- Wu Jing as Liu Peiqiang (刘培强), a UEG trainee astronaut who survives numerous crises involving the Moving Mountain Project and a major character from the first film.
- Li Xuejian as Zhou Zhezhi (周喆直), the Chinese ambassador to the UEG.
- Sha Yi as Zhang Peng (张鹏), a senior UEG fighter pilot and Liu's mentor.
- Ning Li as Ma Zhao (马兆), AI and quantum computing researcher and Tu's colleague.
- Wang Zhi as Han Duoduo (韩朵朵), Liu Peiqiang's fellow trainee and later wife. She eventually succumbs to cancer from radiation sickness.
- Zhu Yanmanzi as Hao Xiaoxi (郝晓晞), Zhou's personal assistant and protégé.
- Khalid Ghanem as tower commander, American commander
- Andy Friend as Mike, the American ambassador to the UEG and a good friend of Zhou.
- Vitalli Makarychev as Andre Graschnov, a senior UEG fighter pilot and Zhang's close friend
- Clara Lee, Tony Nicholson and Vladimir Ershov as the three space elevator hijackers who tried to impersonate astronaut trainees.
- Daniela Tassy, as Emilia, the Brazilian astronaut.

The Wandering Earth 2 is dedicated to Ng Man-Tat, who died of liver cancer in 2021 after starring as Han Zi'ang in the first movie. Ng appears in a brief CGI-rendered cameo.

== Production ==
=== Development ===
After The Wandering Earth was released to major commercial success in January 2019, director Frant Gwo announced at the Golden Rooster Awards on 20 November of the same year that a sequel was in the works, revealing that audiences were being conducted and sorted to guide the sequel's guide structure which will focus more on characters' emotions as well as improving visual effects. Gwo also stated that production may not begin for four years. On 2 December 2020, Gwo announced at the 2020 Golden Rooster Awards that the shooting plan for the sequel has initiated and have set the release date for 22 January 2023, the first day of the Chinese New Year holidays. A teaser poster which features the phrase "Goodbye Solar System" written in numerous different languages was also released.

On 18 June 2021, Andy Lau announced during a live broadcast celebration of the 33rd anniversary of his fan club, Andy World Club, that he will be starring in the film. On 21 July 2021, it was reported the film has been approved by the National Radio and Television Administration and production is set to take place from October 2021 to March 2022 in Qingdao and Haikou. Wu Jing was confirmed to return to the prequel. Aside from directing duties, Guo also co-wrote the script with producer Gong Ge'er while the film will be financed by Guo's company, Guo Fan Culture and Media and China Film Company.

=== Filming ===
Principal photography officially began on 13 October 2021 in Qingdao, where a production commencement ceremony was held. Aside from Andy Lau and Wu Jing, actor Zhang Fengyi was also present, confirming his participation.

== Release ==
On 19 August 2022, The Wandering Earth 2 officially released the first "a little white dot" version of the trailer.

The Wandering Earth 2 was theatrically released on 22 January 2023, the first day of the Chinese New Year holidays. It was also given a North American limited release by Well Go USA Entertainment in 125 screens, 30 IMAX, starting day-and-date 22 January. It was released by Trinity CineAsia in the UK and Ireland a week later. In the Philippines, the film was released by Encore Films through Warner Bros. Pictures on 31 May.

== Reception ==
=== Box office ===
The Wandering Earth 2 was a massive commercial success in China. The film earned close to US$70 million on its opening day on January 22 in China, followed by US$55 million on its second day. In total, it made US$187 million in its first three days In just 8 days, the film had earned over US$378 million with US$31.3 million coming from IMAX shows. The film earned US$56.4 million on its first weekend and passed the US$500 million mark on its sixteenth day. It held on the top spot for a second weekend after earning US$24.5 million.

=== Critical response ===
On Douban, the movie received a user rating of 8.3/10 based on 1.2 million reviews. On the review aggregator website Rotten Tomatoes, 82% of 22 critics' reviews are positive, with an average rating of 6.4/10. The website's consensus reads: "The Wandering Earth II's spectacular visuals and brisk pace are more than enough to make up for its lengthy runtime and nationalistic subtext." Metacritic, which uses a weighted average, assigned the film a score of 56 out of 100, based on 7 critics, indicating "mixed or average" reviews.

== See also ==
- List of submissions to the 96th Academy Awards for Best International Feature Film
- List of Chinese submissions for the Academy Award for Best International Feature Film
