= Supernova Era =

Novel by Liu Cixin

- Author: Liu Cixin
- Translators: Joel Martinsen
- Genre: Science Fiction
- Publisher: Sichuan Science & Technology Publishing House, Chengdu
- Publication date: 2003
- English publication date: 2019
- Pages: 368

Supernova Era (超新星纪元) is a science fiction novel by Liu Cixin. It portrays a luminous stellar explosion releasing powerful electromagnetic radiation and high-energy particles into the universe as far as the Solar System, eight light-years away. Around the world, the chromosomes in human cells are damaged by high-energy rays. Only children under thirteen can repair the damage, while other age groups have only about a year left to survive.

== Background ==
Supernova Era first version was written in 1991, but not released until 2003. Liu Cixin has repeatedly revised the book and published three different editions, not including unreleased versions. Of all, the 2009 edition is the longest and most complete. Tor Books published the English translation by Joel Martinsen in 2019.

== Plot ==
On a seemingly ordinary summer night, a catastrophe brewing for hundreds of millions of years reaches the Earth from deep space. The radiation from the supernova explosion irreversibly irradiates everyone over the age of 13, leaving them with only a few months left to live. Children under 13 years old can recover, but might not. That means that all humans over thirteen in the world will die, and the Earth will become a world with only children.

It is a society the world has never seen before; adults are supposed to teach their children life skills in the shortest possible time, such as running a country, commanding an army, etc. The adults also leave their children the best gift, the Chinese Quantum, a super quantum computer, which will help the children go through a dark age that follows. In the early days of the supernova era, the world of children becomes the last continuation of the world of adults. After several months of seemingly smooth operation, it finally gets out of control.

As the children become tired of the rules and regulations of the adult world, playing becomes their primary interest. First, they want to build a candy world, where the building shell is edible chocolate. They then create the maximal amount of online games. Because all children are participants, online community organizations are equipped to compete even with the state powers, and in the end, they find that the most exciting game is war. Out-of-control children in the Antarctic continent start a world war. After that, China and the United States even exchange their territory.

== Reception ==
The book was reviewed by several sources.

A Hugo Award-winning editor, Jason Heller, said, "Liu began writing 'Supernova Era' soon after the political uprising in Beijing's Tiananmen Square in 1989. The book is suffused with a sense of calamity, tragedy, and swift social change."
