= Taking Care of God =

2005 short story by Liu Cixin

- Short story by Liu Cixin
- Country: China
- Language: Chinese
- Genre: Science fiction

Publication
- Publication date: January 2005

"Taking Care of God" (Chinese: 赡养上帝; pinyin: shànyǎng shàngdì) is a science-fiction short story by Chinese writer Liu Cixin, first published in January 2005. The short story was included in the anthology Invisible Planets by Head of Zeus in March 2016 and the collection The Wandering Earth published by Head of Zeus in October 2017.

== Plot ==
One day, thousands of spaceships appear in Earth's orbit, and at the same time, millions of bearded old men appear in the world's major cities. They claim to have created humanity, which turns out to be true thanks to buried surveillance technology, and that their civilization has now grown old (for example by no longer understanding its own technology) and hence needs to be cared for by humanity. Since they already saw this coming, they created humanity and then embarked on a dilation flight. Each family is then required by law to take in one of the "gods", who are almost three thousand years old, and the Care Age begins. People receive the technological achievements of the gods, but cannot understand them as well.

Qiusheng's family has numerous problems and misunderstandings with their god. A little affection appears when the god confides in Qiusheng's family that the photo he is always looking at is actually a receiver from a spaceship belonging to his lover, which is eighty million light years away. However, the gods decide to leave the Earth together. Not because they have been treated badly, but because they do not want pity as they once even saved the Milky Way from the extinction of all life. As a parting gift, they tell them that they have created three more civilizations on other planets, but that they are much more cruel. One of them has found out the coordinates of Earth, so humanity must flee as quickly as possible. As the gods leave, Qiusheng's family wonders who will take care of humanity when it grows old.

== Translation ==
"Taking Care of God" was also translated into Spanish (2014 & 2017), German (2018 & 2019) and Japanese (2018).

== Reviews ==
Jaymee Goh wrote on Strange Horizons, that the short story "emphasizes filial piety, especially with the warning at the end for humanity to safeguard against the problems of old age by having children of its own." She adds: "As a Chinese reader, I recognize this theme and final exhortation—I also find it tiresome, because it reflects the anxieties of my parents pushing me towards marriage and kids, but it may well land differently for a Western reader."

Gareth D Jones wrote on SF Crowsnest, that the short story "takes a couple of Science Fiction's classic tropes, alien invasion and the seeding of life on Earth, and ties them in with traditional Chinese values of respect for elders, family loyalty and hospitality." It is "a touching and wryly amusing story."
