= Science Fiction World =

Chinese science fiction magazine

- Editor: Liu Chengshu
- Categories: Science fiction magazine
- Frequency: Monthly
- Circulation: 130,000
- Founded: 1979
- Country: China
- Based in: Chengdu, Sichuan
- Website: www.sfw.com.cn?page_id=103

Science Fiction World (Sci-Fi World; SFW; Chinese: 科幻世界; pinyin: kēhuàn shìjiè), begun in 1979, is a monthly science fiction magazine published in the People's Republic of China, headquartered in Chengdu, Sichuan. It dominates the Chinese science fiction magazine market, reaching a peak circulation of 300,000–400,000 copies per issue for a time after 1999, as a result of coincidentally publishing an issue matching the essay topic of the gaokao for that year, memory transplantation, which earned recognition from Xinhua.

== History and profile ==
The magazine was established in 1979 with the name Science Literature. In August 2007, the editor of Science Fiction World, Yang Xiao, organized the Chengdu International Science Fiction and Fantasy Festival, the largest such event ever held in China. An estimated 4,000 Chinese fans attended the four-day festival.

== New editor and staff rebellion ==
In March 2010, the staff of the magazine issued an open letter attacking new editor Li Chang for actions including: cancelling contracts with Chinese science fiction readers and authors; refusing to buy stories from authors, forcing the editors to write the stories themselves; ordering that foreign language editors do all translations into Chinese themselves instead of buying translations, and art editors create the illustrations themselves instead of hiring artists. He also interfered with advertising, replacing the magazine's front cover with an advertisement for a school. All of these malfeasances were claimed as causes for the recent severe drop in SFW circulation, to a low of approximately 130,000. Investigations by China Youth Daily and others verified the accusations, and by 4 April Xinhua reported Li Chang's ouster. Later, Yao Haijun became the deputy director of Science Fiction World.
