= International Examiner =

Free biweekly Asian American newspaper

The International Examiner
- Type: Nonprofit media
- Founded: 1974; 52 years ago
- Language: English
- Headquarters: Chinatown International District
- Country: United States
- Circulation: 20,000+
- Website: https://iexaminer.org/

The International Examiner is a free monthly Asian American newspaper and media nonprofit organization based in Seattle's historic Chinatown-International District.

== History ==
The International Examiner was founded in 1974 by Gerald Yuasa and Lawrence Imamura to serve what the founders thought were the business interests of the Asian American community in Seattle's Chinatown-International District (CID). They hired George Cox as editor and writer, with Imamura handling business logistics. The paper was published in English.

In 1975, the Examiner was purchased by the Alaska Cannery Workers Association (ACWA) for $1 and became an activist, community-based newspaper. Nemesio Domingo, Jr., a founder of the ACWA, hoped to produce a newspaper serving the community of the CID. The paper became independent in 1978, but it continued the tradition of community activism firmly established under the ACWA. As such, its editors were also community activists and organizers, rather than traditional journalists.

The new paper hired three University of Washington graduates from its Editorial Journalism school: Elaine M. Ko, Gary Iwamoto, and Ron Chew. The first issue was published in April 1975. Mayumi Tsutakawa served as an early editor. Chew became the paper's editor in 1976, serving in that role until 1988.

Around 1980, Alan Chong Lau became the International Examiner's art columnist, continuing his work there until at least 2014. Bob Shimabukuro wrote the Bull Session and Fo' Real columns. Shimabukuro later became the paper's editor, and was followed by Danny Howe.

Today, the International Examiner is the oldest Asian American newspaper in the Pacific Northwest and the oldest continuously publishing pan-Asian newspaper in the country. The IE is a registered 501 (c)(3) non-profit organization governed by a volunteer Board of Directors. With its print editions distributed across Seattle, and articles published on a rolling basis online, its total monthly readership is estimated at 20,000.

== Content ==
In 2023, the Examiner published its 50th volume, identifying five areas of coverage: public safety, the arts, housing, transportation, cultural preservation, and commerce.

The International Examiner's editorial team, consisting of Alexa Strabuk and Chetanya Robinson, received 2024 Editorial Excellence awards from fellow journalists at Real Change.

== See also ==
- North American Post
