= A View from the Stars =

2024 short story collection by Liu Cixin

- Author: Liu Cixin
- Translator: Andy Dudak, Adam Lanphier, Jesse Field, S. Qiouyi Lu, Elizabeth Hanlon, Henry Zhang, Emily Xueni Jin
- Language: English
- Genre: Science fiction, Hard science fiction
- Publisher: Tor Books
- Publication date: April 2024
- Pages: 224
- ISBN: 978-1250292117

A View from the Stars is a collection of six science-fiction short stories and thirteen essays by Chinese writer Liu Cixin, published by Head of Zeus in April 2024 and by Tor Books in May 2024.

== Contents ==
=== Stories ===
- "Whale Song" (1999)
- "The Messenger" (2001)
- "Butterfly" (1999)
- "End of the Microcosmos" (1998)
- "Destiny" (2001)
- "Heard It in the Morning" (2001)

=== Essays ===
- "Time Enough for Love" (2015)
- "A Journey in Search of Home" (2009)
- "Thirty Years of Making Magic Out of Ordinariness" (2009)
- "One and One Hundred Thousand Earths" (2011)
- "On Finishing Death's End" (2010)
- "The Battle Between Sci-Fi and Fantasy" (2002)
- "The 'Church' of Sci-Fi" (1999)
- "Poetic Science Fiction" (2014)
- "Civilization's Expanse in Reverse" (2001)
- "The Dark Forest Theory" (2015)
- "The World in Fifty Years" (2005)
- "On Ball Lightning" (2004)
- "We're Sci-Fi Fans" (2001)

== Reviews ==
Paul Di Filippo wrote in the Locus Magazine, that "this collection does not exist at quite the same summit as his previous one" since the stories "amuse, but do not represent the heights of his writing, save perhaps for the final one." Nonetheless, "there's much to admire when they are considered en masse". He adds that "once more, the bevy of deft translators earn our loudest applause" and concludes: "As with the work of Stanislaw Lem and the Strugatsky Brothers, Cixin Liu's writings offer a rich and deep SF-centric worldview whose exoticisms are precisely balanced by the universal commonalities which all SF readers and writers share across the globe."

Kirkus Reviews wrote, that the collection "offers up a palatable blend of speculative science fiction and insightful articles on the genre's past and future". Especially the essay "Thirty Years of Making Magic out of Ordinariness" is "filled with so much insight into the genre, should be recommended reading for all aspiring science fiction writers." In summary, the collection is "a must-read for SF fans and writers alike."

Publishers Weekly wrote, that its fiction entries "may be more down-to-earth, but they're unafraid to ask big questions, including 'What is the purpose of the universe?'," concluding: "For Liu's many devoted fans, this will be a welcome compendium."

Sam Tyler wrote for SF Book Reviews, that the collection "acts as a perfect teaser for a new fan, and as an interest insight into those that already know the author." It is "an interesting collection in that it is not just a collection of stories", but also weighted towards Cixin Liu's non-fiction, mostly on the art and history of science fiction, both as a genre, but also how it developed specifically in China." In summary, it is "more of a retroperspective of Cixin Liu's career and not the latest thinking of the author", but still a "wonderful insight" into a "deep thinker."
