= Megapack (disambiguation) =

A megapack is a large assembly that contains multiples of a smaller item.

Megapack may also refer to:

- Megapack, a rechargeable battery energy storage product from Tesla, intended for use at large battery storage power stations to power the electrical grid
- Megapack, a 2013 collection of short stories by Darrell Schweitzer
- MEGAPACK, a 2014 collection of short stories by Paul Di Filippo
