= Of Ants and Dinosaurs =

2010 novel by Liu Cixin

Of Ants and Dinosaurs/ The Cretaceous Past
- Author: Liu Cixin
- Original title: 当恐龙遇上蚂蚁 (dāng kǒnglóng yùjiàn mǎyǐ)/ 白垩纪往事 (báièjì wǎngshì)
- Translator: Holger Nahm, Elizabeth Hanlon
- Language: Chinese
- Genre: Hard science fiction
- Publication date: 2004/2010
- Publication place: China
- English publication date: 2020/2021
- ISBN: 9781789546125

Of Ants and Dinosaurs (simplified Chinese: 当恐龙遇上蚂蚁; traditional Chinese: 當恐龍遇見螞蟻; pinyin: dāng kǒnglóng yùjiàn mǎyǐ), also known as The Cretaceous Past (simplified Chinese: 白垩纪往事; traditional Chinese: 白堊紀往事; pinyin: báièjì wǎngshì), is a science-fiction novel by Chinese writer Liu Cixin, first published in 2004 (as a novella) and again, expanded, in 2010 (as a novel). It was published under the former title by Head of Zeus in 2020 and under the latter title by Subterranean Press in 2021. Although it is not included in the English translation of the collection The Wandering Earth, translations in other languages include the shorter version.

== Plot ==
Millions of years ago, ants helped a dinosaur remove meat left between its teeth, which results a symbiosis between both species. Since both can do tasks that the other species cannot, two intelligent civilizations quickly develop, but the discovery of nuclear weapons and increasing environmental pollution are causing tensions. The Gondwanan Empire and the Laurasian Republic of Dinosaurs, keeping their conquest of space secret from the ants, each use a passing interstellar asteroid of antimatter to create an even more devastating superweapon. At the same time, the ants are planning an attack, because the dinosaurs, who are less and less dependent on them, are treating them increasingly aggressively. The ants fear their own extinction coming. During the battle, both superweapons go off. The dinosaurs are wiped out and the ant civilization returns to a primitive age without them. Before the long winter lasting three thousand year in total, the ants hope that a medium-sized creature will eventually form an intelligent civilization.

== Background ==
Ants and dinosaurs also play a central role in Liu Cixin's short story "Devourer", which can be regarded as a sequel to Of Ants and Dinosaurs. Ants furthermore prominently appear in his novel The Dark Forest, while dinosaurs again do so in his short story "Cloud of Poems", a sequel to "Devourer".

== Reviews ==
Paul Di Filippo wrote in the Locus Magazine, that the novel is "an old-fashioned speculative look back into the deep past, as well as a wry parable about politics, hubris, power, competitiveness, and intolerance." Compliments in particular goes to the fact that "there is ultimately no one-for-one mapping of our current situation onto their setup." He further wrote that the novella "indulges in a bit of Lovecraftian atmosphere" and near the end "harks to no other author more than Stanislaw Lem", being "like one of those lunatic forays into some bizarre yet organically authentic culture." In conclusion, "Liu seeks to convey that shared glory and shame that attends to all attempts by any kind of sentience to mold the physical universe nearer to the heart's desire—even if the hearts in question are as small as mustard seeds or as large as furnaces."

Gary K. Wolfe wrote in the Locus Magazine, that the novel is "rather light and playful piece, largely suitable for younger readers, might come as something of a surprise." He summarized that the novel "begins as a rather sweet Aesop-like animal fable about ants helping a dinosaur cure a toothache, then turns into a Cretaceous-era parody of the various epochs of historical and technological development (the steam-engine age, the information age, the atomic age, etc.), leading to a rather simplistic recreation of the Cold War and eventually to an ending directly out of Dr. Strangelove, offering a sardonic alternate explanation for the extinction event that ended that era, along with the dinosaurs." He added that it has "playful tone and enormous scope", but still "doesn't leave much room for characterization, and even the handful of generals, diplomats, and scientists who are given names and individual identities are little more than talking viewpoints."

Publishers Weekly wrote that the novella "delivers a sharp allegory of ant-dinosaur relations in this high concept alternate history," which "mingles real science with prescientific beliefs and invests his critters with enough anthropomorphic attributes to make them understandable but not so much as to render them humans in costumes, similar to Orwell's masterful pigs and sheep in Animal Farm."
