= The Messenger (short story) =

2001 short story by Liu Cixin

- Short story by Liu Cixin
- Country: China
- Language: Chinese
- Genre: Science fiction

Publication
- Publication date: 2001

"The Messenger" (Chinese: 信使; pinyin: xìnshǐ) is a science-fiction short story by Chinese writer Liu Cixin, first published in 2001. The short story was included in the collection A View from the Stars published by Head of Zeus in April 2024 and by Tor Books in May 2024. It was translated by Andy Dudak.

== Plot ==
Albert Einstein, though not explicitly mentioned, plays his violin every evening, troubled by his great discoveries being misused for the atomic bomb. Outside his home in Princeton, an unknown person begins to listen to all of his concerts, even in the rain. Albert Einstein invites the unknown person inside, who then reveals to be from the future and has come to alleviate his worries about humanity's potential self-destruction and to discuss the successful development of the Grand Unified Theory in the future. After a short conversation, the future traveler leaves to visit other key figures from history and it is revealed, that the time chosen to visit them is always shortly before their death to not disrupt the timeline.

== Reviews ==
Paul Di Filippo wrote in the Locus Magazine, that the short story "has a Kessel-like flavor."

Publishers Weekly wrote in a review of the entire collection A View from the Stars, that its fiction entries "may be more down-to-earth, but they're unafraid to ask big questions, including 'What is the purpose of the universe?'."

Eamonn Murphy wrote on SF Crowsnest, that this is "a quiet, hopeful story, and you wish it were true."
