= Whale Song =

1999 short story by Liu Cixin

- Short story by Liu Cixin
- Country: China
- Language: Chinese
- Genre: Science fiction

Publication
- Publication date: 1999

"Whale Song" (Chinese: 鲸歌; pinyin: jīng gē) is a science-fiction short story by Chinese writer Liu Cixin, first published in 1999. The short story was included in the collection A View from the Stars published by Head of Zeus in April 2024 and by Tor Books in May 2024. It was translated by S. Qiouyi Lu.

== Publication ==
"Whale Song" was first published in 1999. The short story was included in the collection A View from the Stars published by Head of Zeus in April 2024 and by Tor Books in May 2024. It was translated by S. Qiouyi Lu.

One of his earliest published works, "Whale Song" is described by Liu (along with his With Her Eyes, published the same year) as "nothing more than a forced compromise with the dictates of the market."

== Plot ==
Warner Sr. has attempted many creative and later desperate attempts to smuggle heroin into the United States, but with modern scanning devices, all were unsuccessful. Warner Jr. tells his father about Hopkins, a genius he met at Caltech, and technology developed by him, which could be of interest. When meeting later, Hopkins tells Warner Sr. that he is able to control whales with an implant in their brain and that heroin could be shipped between beaches inside their mouth. Warner Sr. only laughs and by referencing Pinocchio, who was swallowed by a whale and whose nose grows when lying, cuts off the tip of the nose of Hopkins and throws him into the sea. Hopkins is saved by his whale, so Warner Sr. believes him and provides medical attention for his nose. Both later enter its mouth to ship heroin and Hopkins reveals to have been forced to use his technology to transform sharks into missiles and no longer caring about illegal activities like smuggling drugs. Meanwhile, the whale sings a song. Warner Sr. and Hopkins successfully deliver the heroin and Warner Sr. promises Hopkins all the money earned if they continue. Both go back inside the whale to travel back, but realize a ship is following them. It turns out not to be by the police but by whale hunters, although killing whales has long been declared illegal. In their last moments of life, the dying whale bleeding into the sea sings one last song.

== Reviews ==
Paul Di Filippo wrote in the Locus Magazine, calls the short story "a Ruckeresque or Scalzian tale about a crime boss, a mad scientist, and a cybernetic whale", which is "sprightly and fun."

Sam Tyler wrote for SF Book Reviews, that "Whale Song" and "Destiny" are both "fun what-if tales" with "a more pulp feel", which are "fun, quick, but have some good science."

Publishers Weekly wrote in a review of the entire collection A View from the Stars, that its fiction entries "may be more down-to-earth, but they're unafraid to ask big questions, including 'What is the purpose of the universe?'."

Eamonn Murphy wrote on SF Crowsnest: "I like the omniscient author point of view about Whale Song on page 17, which was science poetry, but, overall, this story struck me as black humour."
