= Contraction (short story) =

Short story by Liu Cixin

- Short story by Liu Cixin
- Country: China
- Language: Chinese
- Genre: Science fiction

Publication
- Published in: Science Fiction World
- Publication type: Periodical
- Media type: Print
- Publication date: 1999

"Contraction" (Chinese: 坍缩; pinyin: tānsuō) is a science-fiction short story by Chinese writer Liu Cixin. It was published in Science Fiction World in Chongqing in 1999 and in the anthology To Hold Up the Sky in October of 2020.

== Plot ==
After concluding the Grand Unified Theory, the theoretical physicist Ding Yi calculated the exact moment when the expansion of the universe will reverse and change into a contraction. During a conference to await this event, scheduled to happen that day, Ding Yi explains the basics of the calculations, how neutrinos having mass and dark matter will cause the contraction and how it can be observed by the change from red shift to blue shift. When a colleague enters and declares that her father had just died, Ding Yi just shrugs and claims that she doesn't need to worry. The colleague gets angry and lectures Ding Yi that fathers with a massive effect on our lives are more important than the color of some frequencies changing, not affecting us at all. Ding Yi calmly rejects this and reveals the aftermath of the beginning of the contraction: Time will start flowing backwards. What was once our past, will then be our future. Everybody will speak and walk backwards, but nobody will know anything ahead as one can remember the past, but can't remember the future. The audience reacts with shock as the countdown ends and the era of contraction begins.

== Reception ==
Paul Di Filippo, writing in the Locus Magazine, claims that "despite its one-note gimmicky core", the short story is an "effectively mind-bending tale dealing with the unforeseen fallout from cosmological reversals of interstellar expansion."

Nicole Beck, writing in Strange Horizons, states that "the characterization often falls back on stereotype" and that the short story "drives home the idea that knowledge is a special ability that gives characters security in the most extreme situations." She argues about the main character, that the "entire setup reads like a performance for his own amusement, and [that] he becomes almost sinister in his control of the situation." She thinks that this "suggests that intelligence and the ability to acquire knowledge are perhaps the greatest currency anyone can possess" and that "whether or not one agrees, it is a thought-provoking idea."

== See also ==
- The Hundred Light-Year Diary, short story by Greg Egan about using the contraction to send messages back in time
