= 2018-04-01 =

Short story by Liu Cixin

- Short story by Liu Cixin
- Country: China
- Language: Chinese
- Genre: Science fiction

Publication
- Published in: Esquire China
- Media type: Print
- Publication date: 2009

"2018-04-01" (pinyin: 2018 nián 4 yuè 1 rì) is a science-fiction short story by Chinese writer Liu Cixin. It was published in Esquire China in Beijing in 2009 and in the anthology To Hold Up the Sky in October 2020.

== Plot ==
In the future the human lifespan can be extended to three hundred years using Gene Extension, slowing down natural aging in cells. The protagonist works in a bank and plans to steal the necessary five million yuan, since even twenty years of prison seems minor compared to the gains of Gene Extension. Only his love interest Jian Jian causes him to hesitate. After an April Fools' Day prank by his colleagues about the digital IT republic having deleted all digital currency, the protagonist begins to act. He visits Jian Jian to talk, when she begins to express sadness about still being young when he'll be old. It turns out that Jian Jian has saved enough money for a hundred years of hibernation, with the hope that Gene Extension will be more affordable afterward. The protagonist immediately steals the five million yuan and receives a call about his Gene Extension being made tomorrow. The story closes with him thinking about he and Jian Jian being among the first to truly touch eternity.

== Reception ==
Paul Di Filippo, writing in the Locus Magazine, states that the short story is "short yet potent" and "almost cyberpunk in its depiction of a near-future where expensive longevity treatments, along with half a dozen other crazy trends, have created societal chaos." In a world like this, the "amoral, selfish hero is a perfect fit for the venue."

Nicole Beck, writing in Strange Horizons, claims that since it is the only short story in To Hold Up the Sky to use first person, it is "not coincidentally [....] the most forgettable". She argues that "very little distinguishes the nameless narrator from wallpaper" because "his observations and desires are banal."
