= The Village Teacher =

The Village Teacher may refer to:

- The Village Teacher (film), a 1947 Soviet drama film
- The Village Teacher (short story), a science-fiction short story by Liu Cixin
- The Village Teacher and Other Stories, a 2022 book by Theodore Odrach
