= Butterfly (short story) =

2002 short story by Liu Cixin

- Short story by Liu Cixin
- Country: China
- Language: Chinese
- Genre: Science fiction

Publication
- Publication date: 2002

"Butterfly" (Chinese: 混沌蝴蝶; pinyin: hùndùn húdié) is a science-fiction short story by Chinese writer Liu Cixin, first published in 2002. The short story was included in the collection A View from the Stars published by Head of Zeus in April 2024 and by Tor Books in May 2024. It was translated by Elizabeth Hanlon.

== Plot ==
While the United States is bombing Yugoslavia, scientists Aleksandar and Reznik intend to stop them by influencing the weather through manipulation of atmospheric sensitivity points and the effects of chaos theory. Using specific small actions at the sensitivity points, the weather would be affected, covering Yugoslavia with rain and fog that would limit visibility and prevent the bombs from dropping there.

Reznik went to Moscow to use the supercomputer built in Dubna by Western countries and Russia to run Aleksander's mathematical model which found the right atmospheric sensitive points to affect the weather in Yugoslavia. Back in Yugoslavia, Aleksandar bid farewell to his daughter Katya, who suffered from uremia and had just completed a kidney transplant, and his wife Elena, then headed to the atmospheric sensitivity points.

The first two missions, Aleksandar went to a desert in northwest Africa to smash a large piece of ice, and to the Philippine Sea to blast the sea water with explosives, successfully bringing rain and fog to Yugoslavia for about a week. The third time, Reznik calculated that the sensitivity point was located in Antarctica, and would be able to be triggered multiple times, thus ensuring Yugoslavia's safety for at least half a month. Aleksandar immediately set off for Antarctica, but before they could calculate the exact coordinates, Western countries shut down the supercomputer due to tensions with Russia. Without the precise coordinates, Aleksandar was forced to wait in a small hut in Antarctica, while Reznik continued to look for other supercomputers.

Without Aleksandar's interference, the clouds over Yugoslavia dissipated. During this period, Katya had a high fever due to rejection of her transplanted kidney, and Elena went to the hospital for medicine. She was bombed and killed on the way back home, and Katya also died of rejection a few days later. A few more days, Reznik failed to access a supercomputer, and told Aleksandar everything. In despair, Aleksandar walked out of the hut with his barrel of gasoline, walked aimlessly for some time, and ignited a flame that could not change the weather.

== Reviews ==
Paul Di Filippo wrote in the Locus Magazine, that "placing this extrapolation amidst the Balkan wars of the 1990s adds suspense and emotion to the novum."

Publishers Weekly wrote in a review of the entire collection A View from the Stars, that its fiction entries "may be more down-to-earth, but they're unafraid to ask big questions, including 'What is the purpose of the universe?'."

Gareth D Jones wrote on SF Crowsnest, that the short story shows "Cixin Liu's familiar skill of mixing large-scale disasters with realistic characters and touching relationships," and the "globe-trotting adventure are accompanied by beautifully drawn landscapes and a series of entertaining travelling companions." He further wrote, that "there's nothing overtly science fictional about this tale. There's speculation."

Eamonn Murphy wrote on SF Crowsnest, that "tales of helpless children under attack from superior air power resonated at the time of writing" and that there is "there's an interesting point of view switch."
