= The Hundred Light-Year Diary =

1992 short story by Greg Egan

- Short story by Greg Egan
- Country: Australia
- Language: English
- Genre: Science fiction

Publication
- Published in: Interzone
- Publication type: Periodical
- Publisher: TTA Press
- Media type: Print
- Publication date: January 1992

"The Hundred Light-Year Diary" is a science-fiction short story by Australian writer Greg Egan, first published in Interzone 55 in January 1992. It was later published in the short story collection Axiomatic. It was a finalist for the 2007 Premio Ignotus for Best Foreign Story.

== Plot ==
The discovery of Chen's galaxy moving backwards through time (due to time reversing with the upcoming contraction of the universe) allows the construction of a messaging system to send information into the own past (using mirrors and sending photons towards Chen's galaxy). Every human is granted a hundred words a day to send back a hundred years after their death, to have a diary of their entire life from birth. James, after already having met his future wife Alison just as described in his diary, starts an affair with a woman, who doesn't keep a diary at all, none of which was mentioned in his own. James instead begins to write lies about his relationship with Alison, hence the upcoming bitterness within is not being reflected in his cheerful messages at all. When war breaks out, he begins to wonder about large scale lies from the future and whether he can change anything at all.

== Reception ==
Karen Burnham, writing in the New York Review of Science Fiction, considers the short story to be among the "rather depressing' ones of Greg Egan because if anything can constrain our free will, it is the cold hand of physics in a closed universe".

== See also ==
- The Arrows of Time, novel by Greg Egan about the messaging system and expanding the premise
- Contraction, short story by Liu Cixin about time during the contraction of the universe
- What's Expected of Us, short story by Ted Chiang about the psychological consequences
- Feynman-Stückelberg interpretation, idea in quantum field theory to interpret antimatter as travelling back in time
