= End of the Microcosmos =

1998 short story by Liu Cixin

- Short story by Liu Cixin
- Country: China
- Language: Chinese
- Genre: Science fiction

Publication
- Publication date: 1998

"End of the Microcosmos" (Chinese: 微观尽头; pinyin: wéiguān jìntóu) is a science-fiction short story by Chinese writer Liu Cixin, first published in 1998. The short story was included in the collection A View from the Stars published by Head of Zeus in April 2024 and by Tor Books in May 2024. It was translated by S. Qiouyi Lu.

== Plot ==
A new particle accelerator able to determine whether quarks can be split has been built in the Gobi Desert. A local farmer is invited for the first experiment due to providing food, and because of a lack of understanding of the experiment being carried out, asks why the money was not put into replanting the Gobi Desert as observing increasingly smaller parts of matter will only need more money. After the experiment is carried out, the sky turns white and the physicists realize that the ultimate smallest scale is reached and connects right to the largest known scale of the universe, proving supersymmetry. After the same process is repeated, the sky returns to blue.

== Critical reception ==
Paul Di Filippo wrote in the Locus Magazine, that "Greg Egan comes to mind in 'End of the Microcosmos', a tale wherein high-energy physics threatens to unravel the fabric of spacetime."

Publishers Weekly wrote in a review of the entire collection A View from the Stars, that its fiction entries "may be more down-to-earth, but they're unafraid to ask big questions, including 'What is the purpose of the universe?'."
