= Destiny (short story) =

2001 short story by Liu Cixin

- Short story by Liu Cixin
- Country: China
- Language: Chinese
- Genre: Science fiction

Publication
- Publication date: 2001

"Destiny" (Chinese: 命运; pinyin: mìngyùn) is a science-fiction short story by Chinese writer Liu Cixin, first published in 2001. The short story was included in the collection A View from the Stars published by Head of Zeus in April 2024 and by Tor Books in May 2024. It was translated by Andy Dudak.

== Plot ==
The protagonist and Emma return to Earth after an interstellar mission and sacrifice an engine to crash on a meteorite on a collision course, pushing it into an orbit around Earth. Both eventually realize that their curvature propulsion system has created a wormhole and send them into the past. Events like this rarely occur, but a protocol forbids to interact with the past. Although knowing they stopped the extinction of the dinosaurs, they agree to travel back into the future. After landing back on Earth, they are greeted by humans but learn that dinosaurs still exist and dominate the Earth. After also getting told that the dinosaurs know that the meteor which is still in orbit was diverted due to the impact crater and worshipping whomever responsible as a god, they request to speak with them with the proof from their ship.

== Reviews ==
Paul Di Filippo wrote in the Locus Magazine, that the short story is "lightly but convincingly sketched."

Sam Tyler wrote for SF Book Reviews, that "Whale Song" and "Destiny" are both "fun what-if tales" with "a more pulp feel", which are "fun, quick, but have some good science."

Eamonn Murphy wrote on SF Crowsnest: "This was published in 2001, and it's so 1940s that I don't think any editor at a pro-level Western SF magazine would have accepted it, though they should."
