= Paul Di Filippo bibliography =

A list of the published work of Paul Di Filippo, American author.

== Novels ==
- Di Filippo, Paul (1997). Ciphers : a post-Shannon rock-n-roll mystery. Cambrian Publications & Permeable Press.
- — (2000). Joe's liver.
- — (2002). A mouthful of tongues: her totipotent tropicanalia.
- — (2002). A year in the Linear City.
- — (2003). Fuzzy dice.
- — (2004). Spondulix.
- — (2004). Harp, pipe and symphony.
- — (2006). Creature from the Black Lagoon : time's black lagoon.
- — (2008). Cosmocopia.
- — (2010). Roadside Bodhisattva.
- — (2011). A Princess of the Linear Jungle.
- — (2018). The big get-even.

Will Keats series

1. Lawson, Philip (1998). Would it kill you to smile?. Atlanta: Longstreet.
2. — (2000). Muskrat courage. Longstreet.

== Short fiction ==
Collections

- Di Filippo, Paul (1995). The steampunk trilogy. New York: Four Walls Eight Windows.
- — (1996). Destroy all brains!.
- Ribofunk (1996)
- Fractal Paisleys (1997)
- Lost Pages (1998)
- Strange Trades (2001)
- Neutrino Drag (2001)
- Little Doors (2002)
- Babylon Sisters (2002)
- The Emperor of Gondwanaland (2005)
- Shuteye for the Timebroker (2006)
- Plumage From Pegasus (2006)
- Harsh Oases (2009)
- After the Collapse (2011)
- WikiWorld (2013)

Short stories

Title	Year	First published	Reprinted/collected	Notes
Mama Told Me Not To Come	1993	"Mama Told Me Not To Come". Amazing Stories. January 1993.	Di Filippo, Paul (1997). Fractal Paisleys. Four Walls Eight Windows.; Champion, Sarah, ed. (1998). Disco 2000. Sceptre.	
When you wish upon a midlist star	2000	Di Filippo, Paul (May 2000). "When you wish upon a midlist star". Plumage from Pegasus. F&SF. 98 (5): 97–107. Archived from the original on December 27, 2004.		
The factchecker only rings once	2000	Di Filippo, Paul (Jul 2000). "The factchecker only rings once". Plumage from Pegasus. F&SF. 99 (1): 71–74. Archived from the original on December 27, 2004.		
This is my gun, this is my pen, Sir!	2000	Di Filippo, Paul (Aug 2000). "This is my gun, this is my pen, Sir!". Plumage from Pegasus. F&SF. 99 (2): 74–77. Archived from the original on December 27, 2004.		
Hail to the hack	2000	Di Filippo, Paul (Dec 2000). "Hail to the hack". Plumage from Pegasus. F&SF. 99 (6): 131–134. Archived from the original on December 27, 2004.		
The Magazine Chums versus the Baron of Numedia	2001	Heintz-Ketzep, C. J. Cutlyffe (pseud.) (Feb 2001). "The Magazine Chums versus the Baron of Numedia". Plumage from Pegasus. F&SF. 100 (2): 89–94. Archived from the original on December 27, 2004.		
Ailoura	2002	Di Filippo, Paul (2002). "Ailoura". In Wil McCarthy; Martin H. Greenberg & John Helfers (eds.). Once upon a galaxy. DAW Books.	Year's Best SF 8	
Wikiworld	2007	Di Filippo, Paul (2007). "Wikiworld". In Anders, Lou. (ed.). Fast forward 1 : future fiction from the cutting edge. Pyr.		Novelette
Till human voices shake us, and we frown	2008	Di Filippo, Paul (October–November 2008). "Till human voices shake us, and we frown". Plumage from Pegasus. F&SF. 115 (4&5): 95–98. Archived from the original on September 26, 2008.		
Cockroach Love (with Damien Broderick)	2009	"Cockroach Love". Andromeda Spaceways Inflight Magazine. 41: 33–45. October 2009.		
A short history of the ETEWAF Revolution	2011	Di Filippo, Paul (July–August 2011). "A short history of the ETEWAF Revolution". Plumage from Pegasus. F&SF. 121 (1&2): 136–139.		
Yubba Vines (with Rudy Rucker)	2013	"Yubba Vines". Asimov's Science Fiction. 37 (7): 43–57. July 2013.		
Adventures In Cognitive Homogamy: A Love Story	2013	Di Filippo, Paul (Oct–Nov 2013). "Adventures in cognitive homogamy : a love story". Asimov's Science Fiction. 37 (10–11): 60–63.	The Paul Di Filippo MEGAPACK: 22 Tales of the Fantastic. Wildside Press. November 6, 2014.	
Redskins of the Badlands	2013	Di Filippo, Paul (Nov 2013). "Redskins of the Badlands". Analog Science Fiction and Fact. 133 (11): 60–72.	The Paul Di Filippo MEGAPACK: 22 Tales of the Fantastic. Wildside Press. November 6, 2014.	
Backup Man	2016	Di Filippo, Paul (Apr 2016). "Backup Man". Motherboard.		
The Rise and Fall of Whistle-Pig City	2021		Preston Grassmann, ed. (2021). Out of the Ruins, Titan Books ISBN 978-1789097399	
Life in the Carbyne Age	2014	OM-NIreboot.com.	The Paul Di Filippo MEGAPACK: 22 Tales of the Fantastic. Wildside Press. November 6, 2014.	
Galaxy of Mirrors	2010	Is Anybody Out There. DAW books. January 1, 2010.	The Paul Di Filippo MEGAPACK: 22 Tales of the Fantastic. Wildside Press. November 6, 2014.	
Specter-bombing the Beer Goggles	2011	TRSF: The Best New Science Fiction. MIT Technology Review. January 1, 2010.	The Paul Di Filippo MEGAPACK: 22 Tales of the Fantastic. Wildside Press. November 6, 2014.	
Life in the Antropocene	2010	The Mammoth Book of Apocalyptic SF. Robinson Publishing. January 1, 2010.	The Paul Di Filippo MEGAPACK: 22 Tales of the Fantastic. Wildside Press. November 6, 2014.	
Little Worker	1989	The Magazine of Fantasy and Science Fiction. December 1989.	The Paul Di Filippo MEGAPACK: 22 Tales of the Fantastic. Wildside Press. November 6, 2014.	
Fractal Paisleys	1992	The Magazine of Fantasy and Science Fiction. May 1992.	The Paul Di Filippo MEGAPACK: 22 Tales of the Fantastic. Wildside Press. November 6, 2014.	
The Mill	1989	Amazing Stories. October 1991.	The Paul Di Filippo MEGAPACK: 22 Tales of the Fantastic. Wildside Press. November 6, 2014.	
The Grange	2011	The Magazine of Fantasy and Science Fiction. October–November 1991.	The Paul Di Filippo MEGAPACK: 22 Tales of the Fantastic. Wildside Press. November 6, 2014.	
Phylogenesis	1989	Synergy: New Science Fiction, Number 3.	The Paul Di Filippo MEGAPACK: 22 Tales of the Fantastic. Wildside Press. November 6, 2014.	
Gravitons	1990	Hardware #2.	The Paul Di Filippo MEGAPACK: 22 Tales of the Fantastic. Wildside Press. November 6, 2014.	
Angelmakers	1991	Interzone #141.	The Paul Di Filippo MEGAPACK: 22 Tales of the Fantastic. Wildside Press. November 6, 2014.	
The Jones Continuum	1988	Science Fiction Eye. March 1988.	The Paul Di Filippo MEGAPACK: 22 Tales of the Fantastic. Wildside Press. November 6, 2014.	
Karen Coxswain	2012	Rip-Off!.	The Paul Di Filippo MEGAPACK: 22 Tales of the Fantastic. Wildside Press. November 6, 2014.	
A Night in the Thirteenth Avenue Mission	1993	After Hours #17 !date=Winter 1993.	The Paul Di Filippo MEGAPACK: 22 Tales of the Fantastic. Wildside Press. November 6, 2014.	
I Kant Cuz I'm Too Jung	1989	New Pathways into Science Fiction and Fantasy. September 1989.	The Paul Di Filippo MEGAPACK: 22 Tales of the Fantastic. Wildside Press. November 6, 2014.	
The New Cyberiad	2009	We Think, Therefore We Are. DAW Books. December 1, 2008.	The Paul Di Filippo MEGAPACK: 22 Tales of the Fantastic. Wildside Press. November 6, 2014.	
Yes We Have No Bananas	2009	Eclipse Three: New Science Fiction and Fantasy. Night Shade. October 1, 2009.	The Paul Di Filippo MEGAPACK: 22 Tales of the Fantastic. Wildside Press. November 6, 2014.	
Femaville 29	2006	Salon Fantastique: Fifteen Original Tales of Fantasy. Running Press. September 26, 2006.	The Paul Di Filippo MEGAPACK: 22 Tales of the Fantastic. Wildside Press. November 6, 2014.	
ShutEye for the Timebroker	2006	Futureshocks. Roc Trade. January 3, 2006.	The Paul Di Filippo MEGAPACK: 22 Tales of the Fantastic. Wildside Press. November 6, 2014.	
Return to the Twentieth Century	2011	Return to the Twentieth Century (E-book). 40k. 2011.	Published in English and Italian versions.	
Waves and smart magma	2011	Waves and smart magma (E-book). 40k. 2011.	Published in English and Italian versions.	

== Comic books ==
- Top Ten: Beyond the Farthest Precinct (2005)
- Doc Samson (2006)

== Non-fiction ==
=== Books ===
- How to Write Science Fiction, 40k, ebook edition (2011)
- Science Fiction: The 101 Best Novels 1985-2010, co-authored with Damien Broderick (2012)

=== Essays, reporting and other contributions ===
- "Guest Editorial" in Postscripts 1. (2007)
- Book Reviews in Locus Magazine (Multiple, about 15-20 reviews per year starting in 2013).

=== Review columns ===
Date	Review article	Work(s) reviewed
2000	"Curiosities". F&SF. 98 (3): 162. March 2000. Archived from the original on December 27, 2004.	Hodgson, William Hope (1913). Carnacki the Ghost-Finder.
2000	"Curiosities". F&SF. 99 (3): 162. September 2000. Archived from the original on December 27, 2004.	Chappell, George (1930). Through the alimentary canal with gun and camera : a fascinating trip to the interior. New York: Stokes.
2001	"Curiosities". F&SF. 100 (4): 162. April 2001. Archived from the original on December 27, 2004.	Shirley, Robert (1969). Teenocracy.
2011	"Curiosities". F&SF. 121 (1&2): 258. July–August 2011. Archived from the original on August 6, 2011.	Gotthelf, Ezra Gerson (1935). The Island of Not-Me.
2013	"On Books". Asimov's Science Fiction. 37 (1): 102–106. January 2013.	Guinan, Paul & Anina Bennett (2012). Frank Reade : adventures in the Age of Invention. Harry N. Abrams.; De Anda, Gabriel S. (2011). Cherubimbo. Xlibris.; Pearlman, Daniel (2011). A giant in the house & other excesses. Merry Blacksmith Press.; Kress, Nancy (2012). Fountain of age. Small Beer Press.; Daniel, Tony (2012). Guardian of night. Baen.; Timlin, William (2011) [1923]. The ship that sailed to Mars. Calla Editions.
2013	"On Books". Asimov's Science Fiction. 37 (2): 107–111. February 2013.	Claiborne, Paulina (2012). The Rose of Sarifal. Wizards of the Coast.; Hughes, Matthew (2012). The Yellow Cabochon. PS Publishing.; Irvine, Alex (2012). Mare Ultima. PS Publishing.; Connell, Brendan (2012). The architect. PS Publishing.; Berman, Ruth (2011). Bradamant's quest. FTL Publications.; Bag Person Press Collective, ed. (2012). Lady poetesses from Hell. Bag Person Press.; Mizuki, Shigeru (2012). NonNonBa. Drawn & Quarterly.
2013	"On Books". Asimov's Science Fiction. 37 (7): 107–111. July 2013.	Hatke, Ben (2012). Legends of Zita the Spacegirl. First Second.; Dickinson, Peter (2012). Earth and air : tales of elemental creatures. Big Mouth House.; Bradbury, Ray (2013). Nemo!. Subterranean Press.; Rambo, Cat (2012). Near & far. Hydra House.; Duncan, Andy (2012). The Pottawatomie Giant and other stories. PS Publishing.
2013	"On Books". Asimov's Science Fiction. 37 (8): 107–111. August 2013.	Hamilton, Peter F. The Great North Road. Del Rey.; Hodder, Mark. A red sun also rises. Pyr.; Powers, Tim. Salvage and demolition. Subterranean Press.; Stauber, Katy. Spin the sky. Night Shade Books.; Reed, Kit. The story until now. Wesleyan UP.
2014	"On Books". Asimov's Science Fiction. 38 (1): 101–105. January 2014.	Planck, M. C. The Kassa gambit. Tor.; Newman, Emma. Between two thorns. Angry Robot.; Shepard, Lucius. Five autobiographies and a fiction. Subterranean Press.; Varley, John. Goodbye, Robinson Crusoe and other stories. Subterranean Press.; Dowling, Terry & Jonathan Strahan (eds.). Magic highways : the early Jack Vance, volume three. Subterranean Press.
2014	"On Books". Asimov's Science Fiction. 38 (3): 107–111. March 2014.	Bear, Elizabeth. Shattered pillars. Tor.; Rivera, Mercurio D. Across the event horizon. NewCon Press.; Beckett, Christopher. The peacock cloak. NewCon Press.; Sanderson, Brandon. The Rithmatist. Tor.; Moriarty, Chris. Ghost spin. Spectra.
2014	"On Books". Asimov's Science Fiction. 38 (4&5): 187–191. April–May 2014.	Korshak, Stephen D. & J. David Spurlock. The alluring art of Margaret Brundage. Vanguard Productions.; Shea, Michael. Assault on Sunrise. Tor.; Kiernan, Caitlin. The ape's wife and other stories. Subterranean Press.; Silverberg, Robert. Hot times in Magma City. Subterranean Press.; Mooney, J. E. & Bill Fawcett (eds.). Shadows of the New Sun : stories in honor of Gene Wolfe. Tor Books.
2014	"On Books". Asimov's Science Fiction. 38 (8): 107–111. August 2014.	Leckie, Ann. Ancillary Justice. Orbit.; Shirley, John. Doyle after death. Witness Impulse.; Modesitt Jr., L. E. The one-eyed man. Tor Books.; Saki. The unrest-cure and other stories. NYRB.; Pope, Paul. Battling boy. First Second.
2014	"On Books". Asimov's Science Fiction. 38 (9): 107–111. September 2014.	Griffith, Nicola. Hild. FS&G.; Purdom, Tom. Lovers & fighters, starships & dragons. Fantastic Books.; McAuley, Paul. Evening's empires. Gollancz.; Hamilton, Edmond. The reign of the robots : the collected Edmond Hamilton, volume 4.
2015	"On Books". Asimov's Science Fiction. 39 (1): 102–106. January 2015.	Wrzos, Joseph (ed.). Hannes Bok : a life in illustration. Centipede Press.; Bear, Greg & Gardner Dozois (eds.). Multiverse : exploring Poul Anderson's worlds. Subterranean Press.; Dozois, Gardner & William Schafer (eds.). The book of Silverberg. Subterranean Press.; Shepard, Lucius. Beautiful blood. Subterranean Press.; Edison, David. The waking engine. Tor Books.
2015	"On Books". Asimov's Science Fiction. 39 (3): 107–111. March 2015.	Strahan, Jonathan, ed. (2014). Reach for infinity. Solaris.; Joshi, S. T. (ed.). Searchers after horror. Fedogan & Bremer.; Bennett, Robert Jackson (2014). City of stairs. Broadway Books.; Dellamonica, A. M. (2014). A child of the hidden sea. Tor.; Cornell, Paul. The severed streets. Tor.
2015	"On Books". Asimov's Science Fiction. 39 (7): 107–111. July 2015.	Wilee, Ysabeau (2014). Propehcies, libels & demons. Small Beer Press.; Tiedemann, Mark. Gravity box and other stories. Walrus Publishing.; McDevitt, Jack (2014). Coming home. New York: Ace.; Kress, Nancy (2014). Yesterday's kin. Tachyon.
