= To Hold Up the Sky =

2020 short story collection by Liu Cixin

- Author: Liu Cixin
- Translator: John Chu, Adam Lanphier, Joel Martinsen, Carmen Yiling Yan
- Language: English
- Genre: Science fiction, Hard science fiction
- Publisher: Tor Books
- Publication date: 2020
- Pages: 336
- ISBN: 978-1250306081

To Hold Up the Sky is a collection of eleven science-fiction short stories by Chinese writer Liu Cixin. Two short stories won the Galaxy Award.

== Contents ==
- "The Village Teacher" (乡村教师，2000)
- "Time Migration" (时间移民, 2014)
- "2018-04-01" (2009)
- "Fire in the Earth" (地火, 2000)
- "Contraction" (坍缩，1985)
- "Mirror" (镜子, 2004)
- "Ode to Joy" (欢乐颂, 2005)
- "Full Spectrum Barrage Jamming" (全频带阻塞干扰, 2001)
- "Sea of Dreams" (梦之海，2002)
- "Cloud of Poems" (诗云, 2003)
- "The Thinker" (思想者, 2003)

== Reception ==
=== Reviews ===
Paul Di Filippo, writing in the Locus Magazine, thinks that the collection "continues to provide the same pleasures found in his [Liu Cixin's] award-winning novels: the simultaneous honoring and detournement of classic SF tropes, as filtered through a distinctly non-Western worldview and a quirky set of personal sensibilities." Liu Cixin is "at once a radical and a conservative, an optimist and a pessimist, a member of the Old Guard and of the New Wave simultaneously", making the collection "a bracing mélange." Since the translation is "handled by many different expert translators who are not named Ken Liu" (who is known for translating Liu Cixin's Hugo Award winning novel The Three-Body Problem and its sequel Death's End), the review gives "kudos to them for some excellent renderings, every one of which seems miraculously to converge [....] Liu's actual voice."

Rachel Cordasco, writing for World Literature Today, says that "Liu is interested in how large swathes of time can help humans think about the future of our species and planet." She claims that "time is as much a character in Liu's work as any human, and indeed Liu often is more interested in exploring time's curious properties than describing human relationships, psychology, and interactions."

Nicole Beck, writing in Strange Horizons, states the collection explored "that a human can have an effect on things larger than her comprehension—yet they never cease to remind the reader of how small we really are." She continues that "this writing is not for the faint of heart" since "Liu will test the limits of the reader's imagination" and that "he plays fair in the sense that his special effects are earned. Practical and scientific detail abounds", concluding that "there is a masterful range here."

=== Awards ===
"Full Spectrum Barrage Jamming" won the Galaxy Award in 2001 and "Mirror" won the Galaxy Award in 2004.
