= Heard It in the Morning =

2001 short story by Liu Cixin

- Short story by Liu Cixin
- Country: China
- Language: Chinese
- Genre: Science fiction

Publication
- Publication date: 2001

"Heard It in the Morning" (Chinese: 朝闻道; pinyin: zhāo wén dào) is a science-fiction short story by Chinese writer Liu Cixin, first published in 2001. The short story was included in the collection A View from the Stars published by Head of Zeus in April 2024 and by Tor Books in May 2024. It was translated by Jesse Field.

== Name ==
The quote "Hear the Way in the morning, die content in the evening!" (朝聞道，夕死可矣) is from Chapter Li Ren of the Analects. It expresses an irresistible curiosity and a passion for wisdom.

== Plot ==
Ding Yi drives around the entire Earth in a new particle accelerator with his wife and daughter. Although they don't see anything outside, Ding Yi insists as a theoretical physicist that the human imagination offers the best experience. Shortly before the first experiment, the entire particle accelerator vanishes. An alien projected as a levitating human appears, calling itself a dehazardification officer and reveals to have removed the particle accelerator so that humanity won't cause a vacuum decay. Ding Yi asks how they can find out about the Grand Unified Theory otherwise, but the dehazardification officer claims that it's impossible without initiating vacuum decay and destroying themselves. Although it knows the Grand Unified Theory, whose essential data was transmitted by an ancient alien civilization one tenthousandth of a second before their annihilation in his former home universe, a prime directive forbids sharing it with humanity. Ding Yi asks if telling and then destroying him is possible, to which the dehazardification officer agrees. Hundreds of scientists then gather to learn the ultimate truth about their subject in exchange for their life. Ding Yi is asked by his daughter to step down, but declines and dies knowing the Grand Unified Theory in front of her. His wife let their daughter watch, so she never becomes a physicist, but fifteen years later she still does. In a conversation about the past, her mother learns about the radical different philosophy her daughter adopted, valuing the implications of physics for humans unlike her father.

== Reviews ==
Paul Di Filippo wrote in the Locus Magazine in a review of the whole collection A View from the Stars, that "our last piece of fiction is the longest, and most vibrant and complex", calling it "a Clarkean accelerando," whose "consequent changes to Earth and humanity cascade violently."

Sam Tyler wrote for SF Book Reviews, that it is "an interesting short story, since it balances the humanity with the science", since "the physicists is only driven by knowledge, but we feel sympathy for the man's wife and child as they watch him not only sacrifice himself, but also the relationship he has with his family."

Publishers Weekly wrote in a review of the entire collection A View from the Stars, that its fiction entries "may be more down-to-earth, but they’re unafraid to ask big questions, including 'What is the purpose of the universe?'."

Eamonn Murphy wrote on SF Crowsnest, that this "is another story very reminiscent of Golden Age science fiction, and it’s great."
