= Vacuum bubble =

Vacuum bubble may refer to

- Vacuum bubbles in quantum field theory
- Vacuum bubbles in cosmology
- Vacuum bubbles in hydrodynamics
