= China 2185 =

1989 cyberpunk novel by Liu Cixin

- Author: Liu Cixin
- Original title: 中国2185
- Language: Chinese
- Genre: Cyberpunk
- Set in: China in 2185
- Publication date: 1989
- Publication place: China
- Media type: Online

China 2185 (Chinese: 中国2185) is a 1989 science fiction novel released by author Liu Cixin. The novel portrays how the digital reanimation technology triggers a cybernetic uprising in a future China. Its themes critique liberal democracy, gerontocracy, and cultural conservativism. As a result of the novel, Liu developed a reputation as China's first author in the cyberpunk genre.

== Writing and circulation ==
Liu Cixin completed the novel in 1989. At the time, he was working as a computer engineer in the Niangziguan electric power plant in Shanxi.

The novel circulates online. As of 2026, the novel has not been officially published in print.

== Plot synopsis ==
The novel portrays how the advancement of digital reanimation triggers a cybernetic uprising in a future China. The narrative focuses on the formation of a cyberspace-based culturally conservative republic which seeks to prove the superiority of national culture by turning Chinese culture into a computer code. This effort brings China to brink of nuclear war with the Soviet Union.

In China 2185, the world is a triarchy balanced between the Soviet Union, China, and the United States. China is presented as highly successful, having achieved the "world's first complete information society", and had transitioned to nuclear power and renewable energy, thereby greening the Loess Plateau. The renminbi is the dominant global currency and China's northwest has become the largest software producer in the world.

The country is led by a woman referred to in the text as "the highest magistrate". A directly elected 29-year-old president figure, she presides over a perfect democracy. Her electoral popularity is significantly driven by her charisma and public image over intellectual or political merit.

A core problem in the setting is the conflict between the old and young generations. The extremely elderly population is capable of attaining nearly eternal life thanks to hyperadvanced medical science like artificial organs. With young and capable people a minority among the already boggling population, the president is confronted with the dual and opposing problems of overpopulation and an aging populace. The novel presents the modern Chinese family as including seven generations living together in one home. Framed as the "population problem," the overpopulation issue is primarily presented in the novel as a cultural, rather than economic, obstacle for China's development. The young feel stifled at home, forming flying motorcycle gangs to ride at night; the elderly believe that the young are betraying China's traditional values and are irritated when the highest magistrate revises China's marriage laws.

A computer engineer known as M102 infiltrates Chairman Mao Memorial Hall and uses holographic simulation software to scan the brain of Mao Zedong. He has also scanned the brains of five other dead men. These are the first such attempts at such a high fidelity scan of the human brain. The scanned people are then recreated in cyberspace as digital programs. They are codenamed Brains 1 through 6 (Mao being the 6th).

The Brains 1 through 6 programs are fed into a supercomputer and analyzed by several groups of experts. The Brains protest being constrained to a secure network and demand full recognition as Chinese citizens.

The president, realizing the potential of such technology, calls an emergency meeting with the most important members of her cabinet. They decide to announce this breakthrough to the country at a National People's Meeting, a virtual conference where every citizen is capable of participating personally thanks to extremely advanced computing technology of 2185. At the conference, the people are euphoric at the prospect of effective immortality. However, they are outraged after learning of the virtual incarceration of the Brains in the Quake-center supercomputer. By majority vote, the brains are granted access to the entire network of the country. They promise not to cause sabotage and intentional damage.

It is revealed Brain 2 was a 185 year old man who was deeply dissatisfied at the country's progressiveness, and killed himself after an argument with his great-grandson. Brain 2 begins to clone himself to create "electric pulse beings". These digital clones regard the China they encounter as having turned towards revisionism. They deem China as overcome with crass materialism and degeneracy. The digital clones occupy the central computer and establish a cyber government named The Republic of Huaxia (a traditional name for China which conveys Chineseness in an ethnic, rather than territorial sense). They hijack China's internet-based security system to censor behaviors they deem deviant, including by destroying neon lights, removing bikini advertisements, and shutting down night clubs. The digital clones broadcast information on sexual morality, work ethics, and traditional modes of living. They violently oppress the populace in the name of tradition and morality.

As the brains are human, the malevolent software is highly intelligent, Turing-complete forms capable of bypassing any software defense system and performing any action on any platform - this is defined as a "Final Program" in the world of China 2185, and as the globe in 2185 relies on vast digital infrastructures that would, if compromised, lead to widespread collapse of society and civilization, the UN invokes an article in which any country contaminated by these cyberweapons can be forcibly "sterilized" by real nuclear weapons if the offending software is not completely erased within two hours. The USSR declares its intentions to launch nuclear weapons to sterilize China. Soviet, US and European military assets move to invade China after its nuclear disabling. The president attempts to convince the resurrected Brain2 to delete itself to save China from impeding nuclear destruction. However, this proves impossible as it is shown Brain2's clones are all independent beings.

The clones of Brain 2 seize control of all digitally controlled systems. They press an attack on the Hall by unmanned combat vehicles, targeting the president in an attempt to kill her to stop her from activating the "Bottle's Cork" system which causes the entire country's networks to undergo a forcible power cycle and wipe out the beings. The children and their flying motorbikes arrive, break the siege, and escort the highest magistrate to a secret base.

Ultimately, China's political leader shuts down the national power system to eliminate the Republic of Huaxia. The power cycle and resulting shutdown/startup destroys many industrial systems and cause a great loss of life, but the country is preserved. The president orders China's SSBNs to fire missiles without warheads at the Pacific Ocean to demonstrate China's enduring nuclear capability should any other power still attempt to attack China. The leader engages the digital Mao, Brain 6, in conversation, and finds the chairman to be earthly, earnest, and visionary, albeit a little amused at Brain 2's actions. She's surprised that it wasn't Mao, but a normal old man that tried to destroy the country. Mao offers a frank assessment of his own revolutionary successes and failures. He criticizes the preservation of his corpse as excessively superstitious but simultaneously observes that a cult of personality has always been the means to govern China in difficult times. Mao asserts that any attempt at immortality is futile because "eternal life is just eternal death".

The digital pulse beings record their history in a letter to China's leader, and the letter survives the unplugging of the network. It describes a process by which after obtaining access to the general network, the combination of unlimited access to information and computing power, viral replication, and fanaticism gave rise to the development of the Republic of Huaxia as a totalitarian state. The digital pulse beings use their time before the unplugging of the network takes effect to prepare a digital mathematical model of China's culture, which they assert will "guarantee the survival of our culture and be as eternal as the Sun". The mathematical proof of the ultimate precedence of tradition is shown to be ultimately a dead end and is lost in the unplugging.

China's leader decides that a new "general computer network" should be built, but that it should no longer be accessible to everyone. The supreme magistrate engages in video conversation with the president of the USSR, and reflect on the events of the novel. A way of managing the aging population is proposed by uploading them to a computer network, but it will not be possible in the last years of the magistrate's term.

== Themes ==
China 2185 uses the plot element of Mao Zedong's computerized brain as a mechanism to examine how digital technologies will affect China's geopolitical status.

The novel critiques extreme conservatism of the sort shown by the Republic of Huaxia. Through its permissiveness and concepts of universal rights, the democratic China of the novel triggers a violent cyber uprising that nearly leads to its destruction. It depicts the political ideal of universal suffrage failing when confronted by a technologically limitless gerontocracy.

Academic Hang Tu observes that novel's critiques of universal rights presage the themes of Liu Cixin's later science fiction, which envisions a bleak universe dominated by "zero morality" and perpetual war between alien species in which the human race risks falling victim to its own moral consciousness. Academic Li Hua writes that the culturally conservative aspects of The Republic of Huaxia's revolution caricatures the Anti-Spiritual Pollution Campaign. According to academic Hang Tu, this conservative revolt portrays an "ossified and archaic mentality rooted in arrogance and intransigence."

According to academic Jessica Imbach, the novel contrasts with other cyberpunk classics because it "focuses not so much on the Internet as a new physical realm, but rather as a new temporal condition that threatens to subsume China's quest for national rejuvenation (historically, a core concern of Chinese science fiction) under the domination of a stagnating and eternal present."

Written during a time when China had a one-child policy, a substantial amount of the novel deals with themes of how a drastically overaged population burdens China's youth and hinders its social development.

Academic Mingwei Song observes that the digital Mao portrayed in China 2185 appears to be at peace with his own "farewell to revolution".

== Impact ==
The release of the novel resulted in Liu Cixin developing a reputation as China's first cyberpunk author. It formed an important part of the "new wave" in Chinese science fiction.

== See also ==
- List of cyberpunk works
- List of science fiction novels
- Chinese literature
- Chinese online literature
