= Sea of Dreams (novella) =

2002 science fiction novella by Liu Cixin

- Short story by Liu Cixin
- Country: China
- Language: Chinese
- Genre: Science fiction

Publication
- Published in: Asimov's Science Fiction
- Publication type: Periodical
- Media type: Print
- Publication date: 2017

"Sea of Dreams" (Chinese: 梦之海; pinyin: mèng zhī hǎi) is a science-fiction novella by Chinese writer Liu Cixin. It was published in Science Fiction World in 2002, Asimov's Science Fiction in January/February 2018 and in the collection To Hold Up the Sky published by Bloomsbury Publishing in October 2020. A graphic novel illustrated by JOK and adapted by Rodolfo Santullo was published by Bloomsbury Publishing in August 2021. An adaption of the novella as a series by Youku produced by Liu Cixin and starring Huang Jingyu is planned to be released in 2025.

== Plot ==
During an ice sculpting festival at the Songhua River, a frozen ice ball arrives from the sky. It initiates contact with the artists, revealing itself to be an alien of ungraspable shape to humans enclosed in the ice ball and calls itself a low-temperature artist. Only one of the works sparks its interest, which is from Yan Dong who froze water on thin membranes to get a unique shape of ice crystals. She hence becomes a colleague and friend of the low-temperature artist, but it only wants to talk about art with her. While the low-temperature artist begins a new creation by lifting frozen blocks out of the oceans into orbit, Yan Dong instead asks questions about physics and raises concerns about human survival. At first, the low-temperature artist answers them, explaining to come from an extremely cold cloud of dark matter in intergalactic space and believing, that only art can be a reason to exist as a highly advanced civilization will eventually reach the end of science making even survival trivial. As Yan Dong continues, the low-temperature artist gets enraged and calls her trivial and jealous. After every single ocean has been transported, Yan Dong indeed spends days without eating or drinking to look at the marvelous ring of ice around Earth, naming it Sea of Dreams. After a last exchange, the low-temperature artist leaves forever. Humanity begins a project to launch rockets in space to pull the ice back onto Earth with Yan Dong and others also proposing shooting lasers onto the ice to evaporate and move it. The first meteors to land cause great joy due to finally bringing rain again, but further meteors don't fully burn up and crash into cities or swirl up dust, causing a little ice age. Ten years later, eighty percent of the oceans have been restored with the rest having evaporated into space. Humanity also begins a project spanning multiple generations to bring water from Jupiter and Saturn to Earth, even planning to pull Europa into orbit around Earth as a new moon. Yan Dong returns to the Songhua River, where the ice sculpting festival was started again. Excited, the group cuts out the first ice cube from the frozen surface.

== Reception ==
Rachel Cordasco, writing for World Literature Today, says that Liu "carefully contrasts this cosmic creative act with the suffering and destruction that the lack of water causes on Earth."

Nicole Beck, writing in Strange Horizons, thinks that "Yan Dong certainly has guts, as many of Liu's protagonists do." But she adds that "if you're looking for a deeply nuanced portrait of an individual psyche, this is not the place. Liu is writing from his love of science and technology. Characterization is the weakest point of his craft."
