= With Her Eyes =

1999 short story by Liu Cixin

- Short story by Liu Cixin
- Country: China
- Language: Chinese
- Genre: Science fiction

Publication
- Published in: Science Fiction World
- Publication type: Periodical
- Media type: Print
- Publication date: October 1999

"With Her Eyes" (Chinese: 带上她的眼睛; pinyin: dài shàng tā de yǎnjīng) is a science-fiction short story by Chinese writer Liu Cixin, first published in October 1999. The short story was included in the collection The Wandering Earth published by Head of Zeus in October 2017.

== Publication ==
"With Her Eyes" a science-fiction short story by Chinese writer Liu Cixin, first published in October 1999. The short story was included in the collection The Wandering Earth published by Head of Zeus in October 2017.

"With Her Eyes" was also translated into French (2017), German (2019), Korean (2019) and Spanish (2019).

== Plot ==
The protagonist borrows special glasses for their vacation, which can be used to digitally take a person stationed in space for a long time on vacation. This is cheaper than the round trip flight to Earth. The protagonist is assigned an astronaut who can communicate with them without any noticeable delay, from which they conclude that she must be in Earth's orbit. However, she does not want to comment on this; despite the weightlessness, she feels terribly trapped. Together they name numerous flowers in a mountain meadow; the protagonist's sensory impressions such as touch and smell are completely transferred to the astronaut. In the evening, the protagonist suddenly remembers that there is another place other than space with weightlessness and gets confirmation that the astronaut is indeed stuck in the Earth's core. The propulsion of her ship is destroyed and communication via neutrinos will also break off shortly afterwards. From then on, the protagonist goes on vacation alone, always lying on the Earth and imagining it were made of glass and to see her in the distance. They think that no matter where on Earth the vacation takes them, the distance to her will always remain the same.

== Reception ==
One of his earliest published works, With Her Eyes is described by Liu (along with his Whale Song published the same year) as "nothing more than a forced compromise with the dictates of the market."

=== Reviews ===
Jaymee Goh wrote on Strange Horizons, that "in stories such as 'Sun of China' and 'With Her Eyes,' the expository paragraphs deliver hard-hitting emotional landings that are deeply moving."

Gareth D Jones wrote on SF Crowsnest, that the "rather intense experience of one hitchhiker leads to a heart-stoppingly powerful conclusion."

=== Awards ===
With Her Eyes won the Galaxy Award in 1999.
