= The Village Teacher (short story) =

Short story by Liu Cixin

- Short story by Liu Cixin
- Country: China
- Language: Chinese
- Genre: Science fiction

Publication
- Published in: Science Fiction World
- Publication type: Periodical
- Media type: Print
- Publication date: January 2001

"The Village Teacher" (Chinese: 乡村教师; pinyin: xiāngcūn jiàoshī) is a science-fiction short story by Chinese writer Liu Cixin. It was published in Science Fiction World in Chengdu in January 2001, was later included in the best Chinese Science Fiction short stories from 2001 and also in the collection To Hold Up the Sky in October 2020. It won the Reader's Nomination Award for best short story for the Galaxy Award.

== Plot ==
A teacher in a desolate mountain village in rural China gives lessons to his children every day. Traveling into the city to gain fame or fortune has never sparked his interest. Because of a disease the village teacher does not have much time left to live. Near the galactic center, an interstellar war waging for fifty thousand years between carbon and silicon based lifeforms nears its end. The former intend to form a protective wall in the Perseus arm, which would result in the destruction of a hundred million stars. As intelligent civilizations shall be spared, spaceships are dispatched to search through all of the systems. As the village teacher recites all of the most important lessons for his class in his last moment, one of these searcher spaceships reaches Earth. After his death, the spaceship chooses the class for the intelligence test and asks for copies of their brains. Ultimately, humanity is classified as intelligent and escapes destruction. After a more careful examination, the aliens are surprised by the idea that teachers distribute knowledge, which is unknown to them and causes them to view humanity as a very special species.

== Adaptation ==
The short story inspired the movie Crazy Alien directed by Ning Hao, shot from 26 July 2017 to 9 December 2017 in Qingdao,Shandong and released in Mainland China on 5 February 2019.

== Reception ==
Paul Di Filippo, writing in the Locus Magazine, states that the short story is a "perfect fulfillment" of the stated intention of To Hold Up the Sky to "imagine the relationship between small people and the great universe". The life of the village teacher is "truly despairing and pathos-inducing" and "his dedication and drive and small achievements seem doomed to dissipate uselessly with his death", but when "the teacher's sacrifices pay off" it happens "suddenly" and "unpredictably". In conclusion, the short story is "Simakian in its deep moral simplicity and emotional impact."

Rachel Cordasco, writing for World Literature Today, calls "The Village Teacher" and "The Thinker", which appeared as first and last short story in Hold Up the Sky, the "two most successful stories in this collection" as they "serve as perfect bookends."

Nicole Beck, writing in Strange Horizons, says that the "descriptions are packed with sensitive details, evoking daily life in poor, rural China" and that "once again the reader is made to feel the contrast of scale: a few human lives against a universe full of creatures so advanced they use stars as weapons." The " entire portrayal" of the main character "is more nuanced than expected", and "even though there is a general lack of complexity in the psychology of this collection's characters, it's not necessarily something that detracts from the whole experience."
