= A Year in the Linear City =

2002 short novel by Paul Di Filippo

- First edition cover
- Author: Paul Di Filippo
- Cover artist: Les Edwards as Edward Miller
- Language: English
- Genre: Science fiction
- Publisher: PS Publishing
- Publication date: April 2002
- Publication place: United Kingdom
- Media type: Hardback
- Pages: 80
- ISBN: 978-1-902880-37-2

A Year in the Linear City is a 2002 weird fiction novella by Paul Di Filippo, published by PS Publishing.

== Synopsis ==
The Linear City is a world composed of two across and an enormous but uncertain number of city blocks long, with a river on one side and railroad tracks on the other. The story follows the lives of some residents of the 10,394,850th block throughout the course of a year.

== Reception ==
A Year in the Linear City was a finalist for the 2003 Hugo Award for Best Novella, the 2003 World Fantasy Award for Best Novella, and the 2003 Theodore Sturgeon Award.

In Locus, Claude Lalumiere described it as "Di Filippo at the apex of his idiosyncratic creative energy". In Emerald City, Cheryl Morgan called it "wonderfully bizarre", noting that it is "aggressively SF in content" but "very mainstream in style", and commending Di Filippo for being "content to fill our heads with wonderful ideas and leave us to extrapolate from them." Similarly, at infinity plus, Keith Brooke praised Di Filippo's worldbuilding as "lovingly painstaking", observing that it is "utterly convincing" and "fiction of the highest order." Strange Horizons lauded it as "(m)ythic and grand, yet intimate and moving, (with) an impressive emotional range", and observed that protagonist Diego Patchen — an author of "cosmogonic fiction" — is a "transparent doppelganger" for Di Filippo himself.
