= Liu Cixin =

Chinese science fiction writer (born 1963)

- 刘慈欣
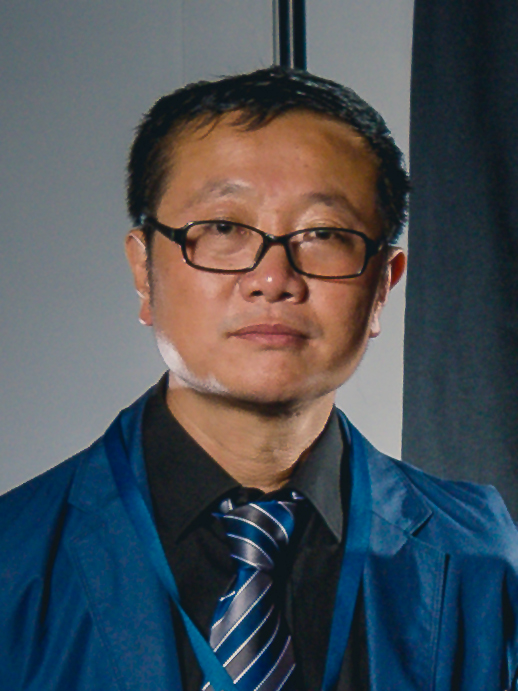
- Liu in 2017
- Born: 23 June 1963 (age 63); Beijing, China
- Education: North China University of Water Resources and Electric Power
- Occupations: Science fiction writer; computer engineer
- Writing career
- Period: 1989–present
- Genre: Science fiction
- Notable work: Remembrance of Earth's Past
- Notable awards: Galaxy Award; Hugo Award

Liu Cixin
- Simplified Chinese: 刘慈欣
- Traditional Chinese: 劉慈欣
- Hanyu Pinyin: Liú Cíxīn
Transcriptions
Standard Mandarin
- Hanyu Pinyin: Liú Cíxīn
- Bopomofo: ㄌㄧㄡˊ ㄘˊ ㄒㄧㄣ
- Gwoyeu Romatzyh: Liou Tsyrshin
- Wade–Giles: Liu^{2} Tzʻŭ^{2}-hsin^{1}
- Yale Romanization: Lyóu Tsźsyīn
- IPA: [ljǒʊ tsʰɹ̩̌.ɕín]

Liu Cixin (Chinese: 刘慈欣; pinyin: Liú Cíxīn, pronounced [ljǒʊ tsʰɹ̩̌.ɕín]; born 23 June 1963) is a Chinese computer engineer and science fiction writer. In English translations of his works, his name is given as Cixin Liu. He is sometimes called "Da Liu" ("Big Liu") by his fellow science fiction writers in China.

He is a nine-time winner of China's Galaxy Award, and has also received the 2015 Hugo Award for his novel The Three-Body Problem, as well as the 2017 Locus Award for Death's End. He is also a winner of the Chinese Nebula Award. He is a member of the China Science Writers Association and the vice president of the Shanxi Writers Association.

== Life and career ==
Liu was born on 23 June 1963 in Beijing. He grew up in Yangquan, Shanxi, where his parents had been sent to work in the mines. Due to the violence of the Cultural Revolution he was sent to live in his ancestral home in Luoshan County, Henan. Liu graduated from the North China University of Water Conservancy and Electric Power in 1988. He then worked as a computer engineer at a power plant in Shanxi province. While working as an engineer, he finished his first two long form novels, China 2185 and Supernova-Era.

In 2021, Liu announced that he would head SenseTime's Science Fiction Research Planetary Centre.

=== Computer programming ===
Liu programmed "Electronic Poet" (电子诗人), which according to academic Jessica Imbach is probably China's first poetry generator. It can be found online. It appears to be a language model, capable of generating works in the style of 1980s Misty poems.

== Writing ==
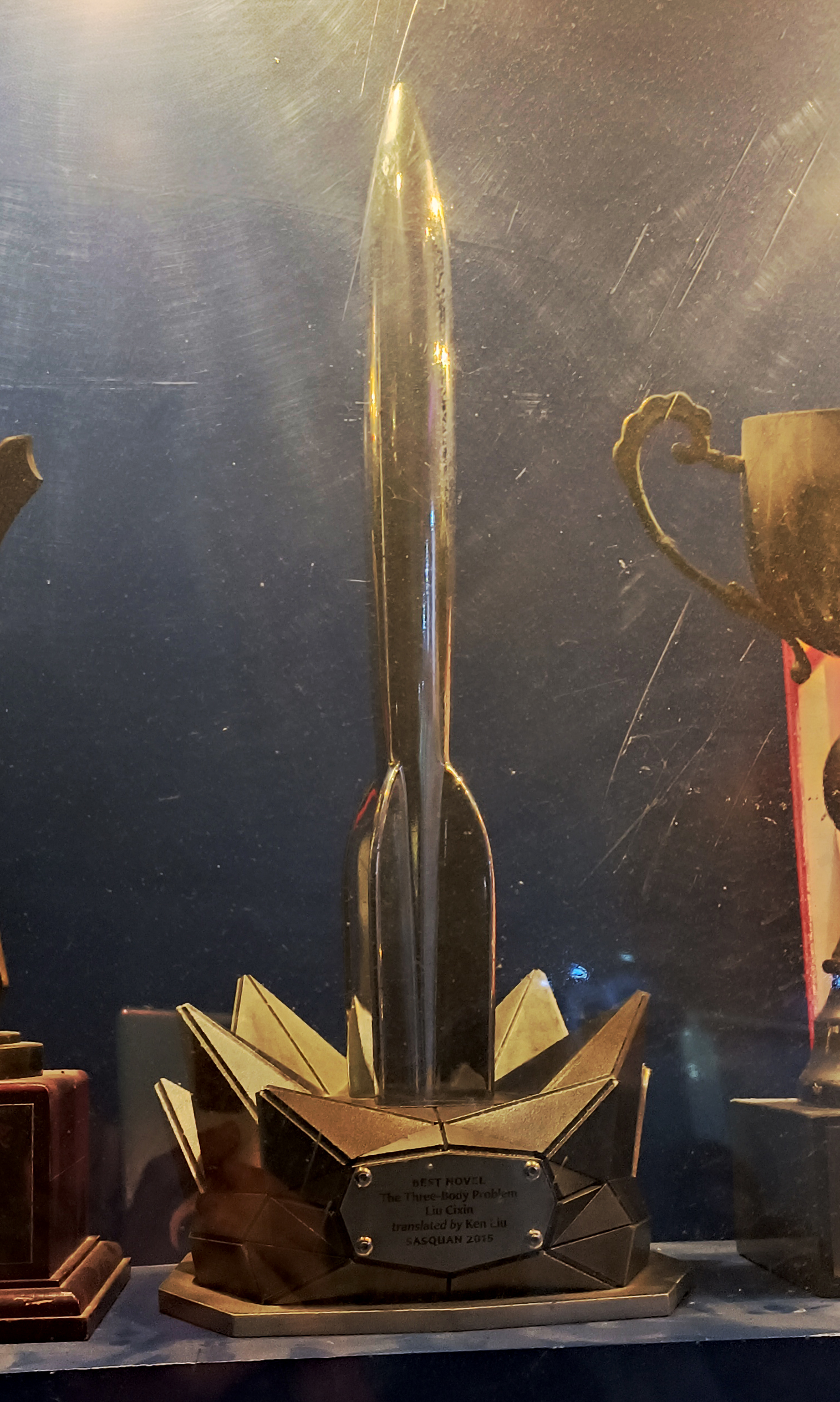
The Hugo Award trophy won by Liu

Liu's works are often considered hard science fiction. His narratives incorporate Stephen Hawking's theories, as astrophysics concepts including wormholes, the curvature of the universe, the expanding universe, and black holes.

Liu was labeled the first cyberpunk Chinese author after his novel China 2185 was released in 1989. This novel imagines the digital recreation a digital clone the brains of Mao Zedong and five other men, and the consequences that follow once the digital beings enter China's general network.

Liu's most famous work, The Three-Body Problem, was first published in 2006. It is the first book in the Remembrance of Earth's Past trilogy, and it chronicles the events that unfold after Ye Wenjie intercepts an intergalactic signal and encourages an alien species known as the Trisolarans to visit. American author Ken Liu's 2014 translation (published by Tor Books) won the 2015 Hugo Award for Best Novel, and the book sold 1,200,000 copies in China before it won. Liu Cixin thus became the first author from Asia to win Best Novel. The German translation (which included some portions of the original text not included in the English translation) followed in 2016. Ken Liu also translated the third volume of The Three-Body Problem series, Death's End, in 2016. Death's End was a 2017 Hugo Award for Best Novel finalist and won a 2017 Locus Award for Best Science Fiction Novel.

As pieces of Chinese science fiction literature, Liu's Remembrance of Earth's Past trilogy was a success within both the Chinese territories and internationally. In 2012, the winner of the Nobel Prize of Literature, Mo Yan, acclaimed the remarkable originality of Liu Cixin. Liu's fiction focuses primarily on problems such as social inequality, scientific development and ecological limitations that impact humanity. Liu cites English authors George Orwell and Arthur C. Clarke as important literary influences. The books of Jules Verne were also literary works that Liu frequented growing up.

To Liu, literature can appear as a self-absorbed art form, mentioning that, despite the species' brief existence in the overall span of the universe, humanity uses literature to mostly write about their own experiences. Due to this idea, and because of his belief in hard science fiction, Liu tries to place importance on science and technology instead of humanity in his own writing. However, he still acknowledges that, compared to science, literature expresses its qualities in a way that is not barred behind prerequisite knowledge.

Liu tries to express the majesty of science through literature, using the genre of science fiction to create an accessible pathway between the two. Because not everyone can dedicate the amount of time needed to become an expert on the subject, Liu wanted to use his work as a means of doing away with science's barriers of entry in order to share its "beauty" with the world.

Liu, in addition to a plethora of other Chinese science fiction authors, also coined the critical theory of "sci-fi realism", a way of writing that focuses on the evolution of science fiction as a genre in comparison to the growth of science and technology in the real world. According to Liu, taking reality out of science fiction is an arduous task, as writers use the genre to write about imaginative ideas in the most grounded way they can, trying to ground the unbelievable in some sort of reality.

=== Adaptations ===
Chinese video platform Tencent Video released a series based on The Three-Body Problem in January 2023.

A cinematic adaptation of The Three-Body Problem has been filmed, but its release has been indefinitely postponed. In March 2018, Amazon was rumored to be negotiating for the rights to the project. However, YooZoo Pictures released a statement in response stating that it was the "sole owner of the rights for film and TV series adaptations." Although it "was originally scheduled to be released in 2017," the project "was postponed indefinitely due to the company's internal shuffling and the rumored 'bad quality' of the film's first cut." In June 2019, it was reported that work had begun on an animated adaptation, and in 2020, October Media announced another adaptation in the works.

The cinematic adaptation of his short story The Wandering Earth was released in China on 5 February 2019, which became the second highest-grossing film in the Chinese box office within 2 weeks.

The science-fiction comedy film Crazy Alien, adapted from his science fiction short story The Village Teacher, had grossed 2.2 billion at the box office, making it the fifteenth film in Chinese film history with a box office exceeding 2 billion.

US streaming platform Netflix announced in September 2020 that it had ordered an English-language series based on Liu's trilogy The Three-Body Problem. Liu would serve as a consulting producer on the project. David Benioff and D.B. Weiss were named as writers and executive producers. Other members of the creative team included executive producer Rian Johnson, Ram Bergman, Bernadette Caulfield, Nena Rodrigue, Lin Qi, and Rosamund Pike. The Netflix television adaptation started production in early November 2021, and was released on 21 March 2024. It is not able to be officially watched in China, though viewers can use VPNs to circumvent geo-restrictions or view pirated versions.

A Chinese adaptation called "Three-Body" with available English subtitles was premiered on January 15, 2023 on Amazon Prime. Season 1 of the series is 30 episodes and follows the details of the first book much more closely than the Netflix Adaptation. Season 2, "Three-Body 2-Dark Forest," was announced on June 19, 2026.

Chinese video sharing website Bilibili released a series exploring the science of Liu Cixin's science fiction in November 2022.

== Recurring themes ==
In most of Liu's works, two themes are prominent: posthumanism and political criticism through the lens of a utopia. While Liu's use of posthumanism is more overt than his use of political criticism, both themes play an important role in some of Liu's most famous works, including The Three-Body Problem trilogy and China 2185.

=== Posthumanism ===
As a proponent of hard science-fiction, Liu thinks that human belief systems, and how self-referential they are, pale in significance when compared to science, technology, and the greater universe. Thus, even if human life were to be extinguished, it would be of little importance to the rest of the universe at large. Typically, his human characters come into contact with extraterrestrial beings from worlds unfamiliar to them, beings so intimidating and otherworldly that their mere existence makes humans seem unimportant in comparison.

In The Three-Body Problem trilogy, the aliens Ye Wenjie contacted to invade Earth, known as the Trisolarans, serve as a way to rebuke the tendency toward anthropocentrism through the gap in power their presence creates. The science and technology the Trisolarans wield far exceeds anything humanity could create, again reflecting Liu's advocacy of hard science fiction. Furthermore, Liu uses the Trisolarans to reflect humanity, emphasizing their "faults" – like competition and authoritarianism – in order for readers to understand what should be fixed in human society. Liu believes that science and technology should be used with caution and respect, because giving into them completely could potentially lead to something truly frightening.

When juxtaposed with his contemporaries, Liu's work can seem cold and dark; however, this isn't always the case. Despite the fact that The Three-Body Problem trilogy ends with the destruction of humankind's world, it leaves things "open" for the humans by showing them that there are still planets out in the depths of space that haven't been explored yet, meaning that they have a chance to find a home again. Liu's posthuman worlds, ironically, give humanity the chance to live again and appreciate the wonders of the universe instead of focusing solely on themselves.

=== Political criticism through the lens of a utopia ===
While subtle political criticism can be found in most of Liu's works, it is especially prominent in his first novel, China 2185. Using the lens of an utopia, the novel subtly critiques the at-the-time Chinese government by implicitly juxtaposing it with the government of the book; in it, China has become a democratic country, with each citizen equally obtaining the right to vote.

Because the utopian, democratic government of China 2185 is a stark contrast from the authoritarian government of China that Liu experienced in the mid-to-late 1980s, readers can therefore look at everything happening in the real world through the lens of skepticism; China 2185 shows readers what they lack in terms of government without ever stating it outright. Using it as a comparison, readers could understand the problems facing empirical China, politically and socially, and how it might benefit China to become a democratic country like the one featured in the novel.

As utopian as it may seem from a first glance, the democratic world Liu displays in China 2185 isn't without its problems as well; however, when these problems do arise, they are mostly the fault of the resurrected brains. Because of their association with Mao, these brains reflect the more communist politics of China, and as they bring in problems from the society Liu had to live through into the democratic world of the novel, they completely disrupt it. With that in mind, the novel reflects the real world political conflicts of the time of the novel's publication, explicitly tackling the idea of the battle between "younger," democratic politics and "older", communist politics. In this utopian society, thanks to the arrival of the internet, the people are able to communicate with the democratic leaders of their country and, as an extension of that, take part in various governmental processes, like policy-making, something readers couldn't do in real life during the time of the book's publication.

Twists on Utopia can also be found in Liu's Three-Body Problem trilogy, with the near-perfect "starship civilizations", worlds in the depths of space that operate without the need for living beings, containing lingering aspects of Chinese political values like communism and Maoism, something that gives the human characters hope that they can call these places home. However, these civilizations are not hospitable for humans, instead being more dangerous than the characters originally thought. In their attempts to adapt to them, the humans find themselves eventually having to resort to cannibalism in order to survive, forcing themselves to commit heinous acts in the dim hope of claiming this place as their new home. While Liu includes other instances of political criticism in the Three-Body Problem trilogy (e.g. the struggle session the first book opens with), the "starship civilizations" are an example of how Liu can subvert common science fiction tropes like utopia to do so.

== The Three-Body Problem ==
Released in 2006, and translated to English in 2014, The Three-Body Problem was a major success commercially, becoming a best-seller in the United States after the release of its translation. The novel, as well as the third book in the trilogy (and the unofficial fourth book by Chinese author Baoshu), was translated by Ken Liu.

The novel has garnered several awards, including a Hugo Award in 2015 and a Nebula award. Death's End, the third and final novel in the trilogy, was also nominated for the Hugo award in 2017.

One of the key ideas of The Three-Body Problem trilogy is the dark forest hypothesis, a theory that advises humans not to contact aliens because of potential negative consequences.

== Film and television works ==
Year	Work	Type	Role
2019	The Wandering Earth	Movie	Original, Executive Producer
2019	Crazy Alien	Movie	Original
2021	Earth Rescue Day (末日拯救)	Movie	Screenwriter
2022	Rendezvous with the Future	TV series	Main Interviewee
2023	Three-Body	TV series	Original
2023	The Wandering Earth 2	Movie	Executive Producer
2024	3 Body Problem	TV series	Original, Consulting Producer

== Personal life ==
Liu is married and has a daughter.

=== Political views ===
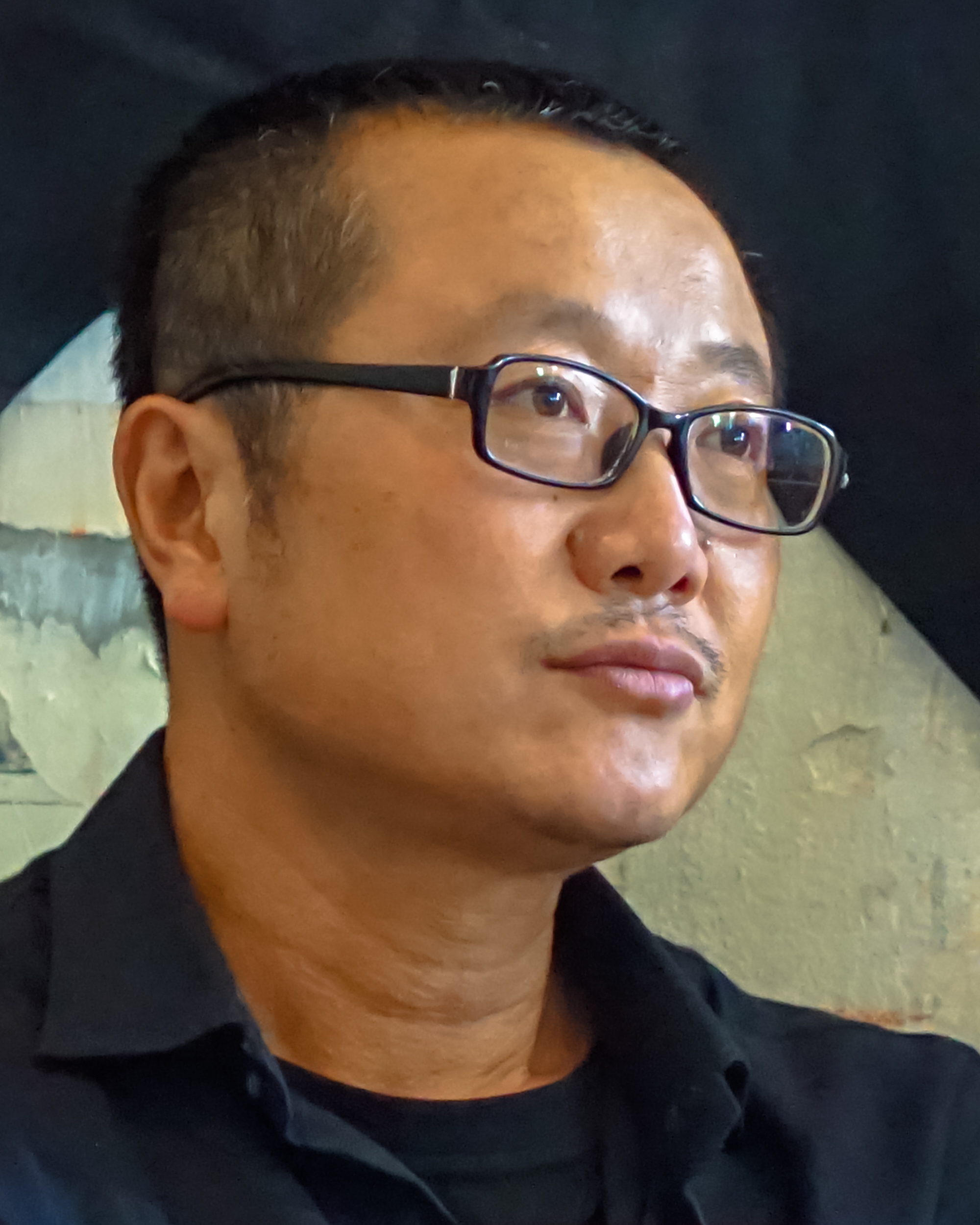
Liu at the Geek Bar Authors Event in 2015

In a June 2019 interview published in The New Yorker, interviewer Jiayang Fan found that Liu "prefers to avoid" talking about politics. In the same article, Liu stated that democracy was not appropriate for modern China. When probed by Fan about "individual liberty and freedom of governance", Liu said that this is "not what Chinese people care about", adding "If you were to loosen up the country a bit, the consequences would be terrifying." He expressed support for policies such as the one-child policy. He also expressed support for China's Xinjiang policies, alluding to the April 2014 Ürümqi attack and saying "Would you rather that they be hacking away at bodies at train stations and schools in terrorist attacks? If anything, the government is helping their economy and trying to lift them out of poverty."

Nevertheless, Liu's works (including some of his adaptations) contain various subtle and plot-wide criticisms of the actions of the Chinese Communist Party (CCP). In one such case, Liu moved a brutal struggle session that was common during the Cultural Revolution from the middle of the book to the beginning of The Three-Body Problem's English translation when suggested by his translator, Ken Liu. In response to the prominently placed plot point, Liu Cixin replied, "That is how I wanted it originally!" The Netflix adaptation, where Liu Cixin was also a consultant, also starts with the struggle session. Liu Cixin's Chinese publishers chose to place the politically charged scene in the middle of the book instead of the beginning, in order to get past government censors.

Polish science fiction critic Wojciech Orliński argued that Liu's works such as Remembrance of Earth's Past and The Wandering Earth represent "endorsement of concepts of world government, consequentialism" as well as "tacit approval" of "China's surveillance and control society". Furthermore, Liu believes that the Chinese Government should try and help the people of the world today when it comes to the issues and challenges they face in life. Research into aliens was something Liu also recommended that the government should consider attaching onto the Twelfth Five-Year Plan for Economic and Social Development.

== Bibliography ==
=== Novels ===
- China 2185 (中国2185) (1989)
- The Devil's Bricks (魔鬼积木) (2002)
- Supernova Era (超新星纪元) (2003)
- Ball Lightning (球状闪电) (2004)
- Remembrance of Earth's Past (地球往事) trilogy:
  - The Three-Body Problem (三体) (2006)
  - The Dark Forest (黑暗森林) (2008)
  - Death's End (死神永生) (2010)
- Of Ants and Dinosaurs (2010), also published as The Cretaceous Past (2021)

=== Works of short fiction ===
1998
- "End of the Microcosmos" (微观尽头) (Science Fiction World)

1999

- "Whale Song" (鲸歌) (Science Fiction World)
- "With Her Eyes" (带上她的眼睛) (Science Fiction World)
- "Contraction" (坍缩) (Science Fiction World)

2000

- "Fire in the Earth" (地火) (Science Fiction World)
- The Wandering Earth (流浪地球) (Science Fiction World)

2001

- "The Village Teacher" (乡村教师) (Science Fiction World)
- "Full Spectrum Barrage Jamming" (全频带阻塞干扰) (Science Fiction World)
- "The Micro-Era" (微纪元) (Science Fiction World)

2002

- "Butterfly" (混沌蝴蝶) (科幻大王)
- "Devourer" (吞食者) (Science Fiction World)
- "Sea of Dreams" (梦之海) (Science Fiction World)
- "Destiny" (命运)
- "Heard It in the Morning" (朝闻道)
- "Sun of China" (中国太阳) (Science Fiction World)
- "The Angel Era" (天使时代) (Science Fiction World)
- "The Messenger" (信使) (Science Fiction World)
- 西洋

2003

- "The Glory and the Dream" (光荣与梦想) (Science Fiction World)
- "Cloud of Poems" (诗云) (Science Fiction World), also known as Cloud of Poems
- "Cannonball" (地球大炮) (Science Fiction World)
- "The Thinker" (思想者) (Science Fiction World)

2004

- "Mirror" (镜子) (Science Fiction World)
- "Yuanyuan's Bubbles" (圆圆的肥皂泡)

2005

- "Taking Care of God" (赡养上帝) (Science Fiction World)
- "For the Benefit of Mankind" (赡养人类) (Science Fiction World)
- "Ode to Joy" (欢乐颂) (九州幻想)

2006

- "Mountain" (山) (Science Fiction World)

2009

- "2018-04-01" (2018年4月1日)
- "Moonlight" (月夜) (生活)

2010

- "Curse 5.0" (太原之恋) (九州幻想)

2011

- 烧火工 (guokr.com)

2014

- "The Circle" (圆) (Carbide Tipped Pens: Seventeen Tales of Hard Science Fiction)
- "Time Migration" (时间移民)

2016

- "The Weight of Memories" (人生)

2018

- "Fields of Gold" (黄金原野) (Twelve Tomorrows)

=== Collections ===
2003

- 爱因斯坦赤道

2004

- With Her Eyes (带上她的眼睛)

2008

- The Wandering Earth (流浪地球)
- 魔鬼积木·白垩纪往事

2014

- Time Migration (时间移民)
- 2018

2020

- To Hold Up the Sky

2024

- A View from the Stars

=== Essays ===
2003

- 文明的反向扩张 (Science Fiction World)
- 远航！远航！ (Science Fiction World)

== Awards ==
Year	Title		Award	Category	Result	Ref
2001	带上她的眼睛	(With Her Eyes)	Yinhe (Galaxy Award (China))		Awarded	
2005	赡养人类	(Support Human Beings)	Yinhe (Galaxy Award (China))		Awarded	
2006	三体	(The Three-Body Problem)	Yinhe (Galaxy Award (China))		Awarded	
2015	赡养上帝	(¿Quién cuidará de los dioses?)	Ignotus Awards	Foreign Short Stories	Nominated	
2015	三体		Hugo Award	Best Novel	Awarded	
2015	三体	(The Three-Body Problem)	John W. Campbell Memorial Award	—	Nominated	
2015	三体	(The Three-Body Problem)	Locus Award	Best SF Novel	Nominated	
2015	三体	(The Three-Body Problem)	Nebula Award	Best Novel	Nominated	
2015	三体	(The Three-Body Problem)	Prometheus Award	—	Nominated	
2017	三体	(The Three-Body Problem)	Canopus Awards	—	Nominated	
2017	三体	(Die drei Sonnen)	Kurd-Laßwitz-Preis	Best Foreign SF work	Awarded	
2017	三体	(El problema de los tres cuerpos)	Premio Ignotus	Foreign Novel	Awarded	
2017	三体	(Le Problème à trois corps)	Grand prix de l'Imaginaire	Foreign Novel	Nominated	
2017	死神永生	(Death's End)	Dragon Award	Best Science Fiction Novel	Nominated	
2017	死神永生	(Death's End)	Hugo Award	Best Novel	Nominated	
2017	死神永生	(Death's End)	Locus Award	Locus Award for Best Science Fiction Novel	Awarded	
2018	—	—	Arthur C. Clarke Award for ...	—	Awarded	
2019	圆	(The Circle)	Seiun Award	Best Translated Short Story	Awarded	
2020	三体	(The Three-Body Problem)	Seiun Award	Best Translated Long Work	Awarded	
2021	三体II 黒暗森林	(The Dark Forest)	Seiun Award	Best Translated Long Work	Awarded	
2023	流浪地球	(The Wandering Earth)	Seiun Award	Best Translated Short Story	Awarded	
