= Cloud of Poems =

1997 short story by Liu Cixin

"Cloud of Poems" (Chinese: 诗云; pinyin: Shi yun) is a short story written by Liu Cixin in 1997. It was published in the March 2003 issue of Science Fiction World.

== Plot ==
Yiyi, a poet, Big-tooth, an ambassador, and Li Bai, also a poet, are travelling on a yacht to the South Pole. Ten years ago, Big-tooth went with Yiyi to meet the "god" that had recently appeared in the Solar System. They meet the god, who is in the form of a sphere floating above a plane, in space. Yiyi is almost killed by the god, but the poems he has catch the god's interest. After reading a few of the poems, the god almost kills Yiyi again, but is again interested in him after he says that poetry is an unsurpassable art form.

Both Big-tooth and the god think that technology can surpass all, but Yiyi insists that poetry is a representation of the human soul. The god then takes a sample of Yiyi's genes and becomes human, explaining after that he does this with every species he meets to truly understand their art form. The god calls himself Li Bai, after the poet Li Bai, and then declares that there are two ways to surpass the original Li Bai: to create poems better than him, or to create all possible poems. Li Bai thus starts constructing the Poetry Cloud, which will create and store all possible poems, even though it requires the destruction of the sun and most of the solar system.

After hollowing out the Earth for material, Li Bai restore humans and some dinosaurs to it, along with a white hole to provide light. The story then returns to Yiyi, Big-tooth, and Li Bai on the yacht. When they reach the South Pole, they use the Earth's gravity to go to space to see the Poetry Cloud. When the three of them see the poetry cloud, Li Bai starts to lament on how technology cannot appreciate poetry. This is after his attempt at writing a poetry recognition software. Big-tooth questions if technology can reach the essence of intelligent life. Before leaving, Li Bai gives Big-tooth and Yiyi chips containing all of the poems that mention their names.

== Themes ==
The tension between technology and humanism is the main subject of "Cloud of Poems". The three main characters, Yiyi, Big-tooth, and Li Bai, represent the three different viewpoints in regard to the debate between technology and humanism. Yiyi represents those who think that one can only understand the world using poetic aesthetics, and that technology could make humans lose the spirituality required to understand aesthetics. This is alike to the perspective of Confucian humanists. Big-tooth represents those who think that technology is a powerful force. Liu uses his portrayal of Big-tooth to expose how science has its limitations.

The final character, Li Bai, represents the intermediary of Yiyi and Bigtooth's viewpoints. He represents Liu's thought that humanism and technology should complement each other; that both are useful. This is also reflected in the conclusion of the story; how technology cannot capture the essence of poetry.

Another idea that is espoused by Liu is that there are too many creative constraints in Chinese science fiction. This is shown in a paragraph where Li Bai dismisses eliminating poems that do not follow classic Chinese prosody.

== Reception ==
"Cloud of Poems" is held in high regard by readers.
