= Paul Di Filippo =

American science fiction writer (born 1954)

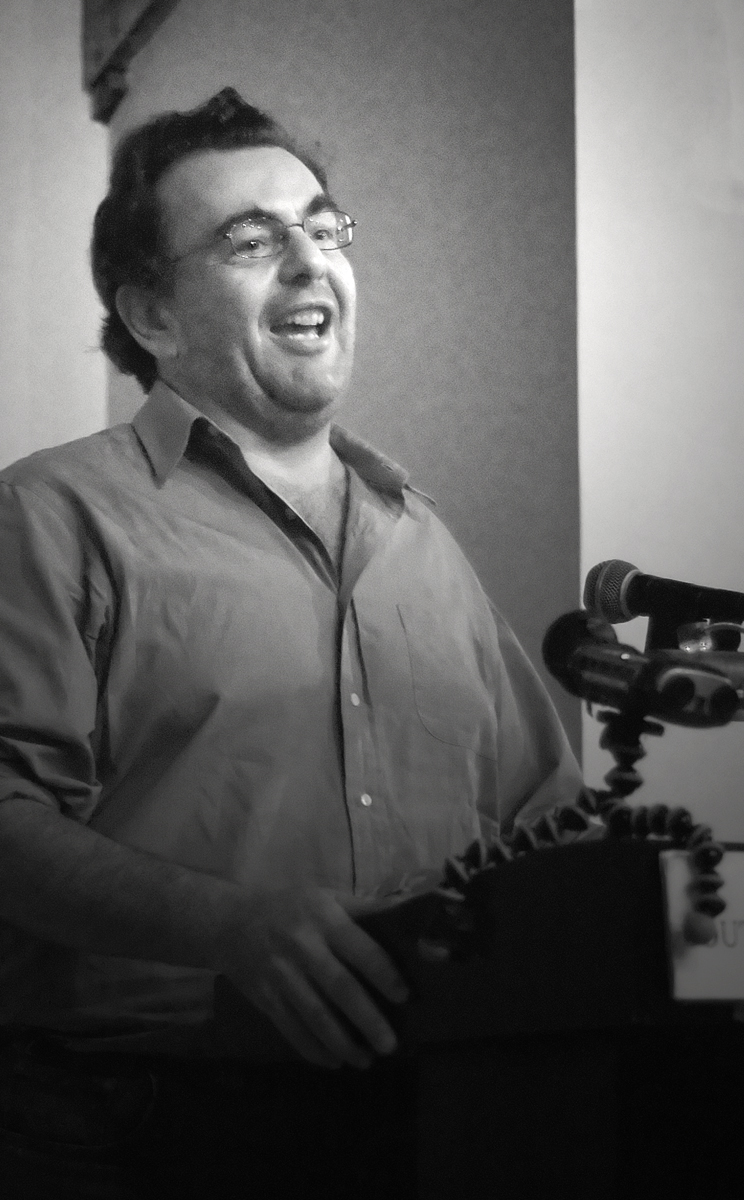
- Born: October 29, 1954 (age 71); Woonsocket, Rhode Island, U.S.
- Occupation: Writer
- Writing career
- Genre: Science fiction
- Website: paul-di-filippo.com

Paul Di Filippo (born October 29, 1954) is an American science fiction writer.

He is a regular reviewer for print magazines Asimov's Science Fiction, The Magazine of Fantasy & Science Fiction, Science Fiction Eye, The New York Review of Science Fiction, Interzone and Nova Express, as well as online at Science Fiction Weekly. He is a member of the Turkey City Writer's Workshop.

Antonio Urias writes that Di Filippo's writing has a "tradition of the bizarre and the weird".

His novella A Year in the Linear City was nominated for a Hugo Award for Best Novella.

Since 2013 Di Filippo has written regular book reviews for Locus Magazine Locus Magazine.

== Early life ==
Di Filippo was born in Woonsocket, Rhode Island.

== Critical reception ==
Antonio Urias praised the collection The Steampunk Trilogy (1995) in a brisk review, writing in summary that the tripartite book "contains three bizarre and occasionally humorous novels taking the reader from Queen Victoria's amphibian doppelganger to racist naturalists and black magic, and finally the interdimensional love story of Emily Dickinson and Walt Whitman."

The first novella, simply entitled "Victoria" follows Cosmo Cowperthwait the inventor of a human-amphibian hybrid that bares (sic) an uncanny resemblance to Her Majesty, Queen Victoria, as well as an insatiable sexual appetite. This is a satire of Victorian mores, politics, and, of course, of the stereotypical mad scientist.

...The second novella is Hottentots is (sic) less outrageously funny, at least on the surface. This is in part due to the fact that the story is told, for the most part through the eyes of Swiss-born naturalist Louis Agassiz, who is apart from pompous and self-aggrandizing, also a proud unrepentant racist. As a result, Di Filippo adopts a more satirical tone as Agassiz confronts anarchists, voodoo, academic maneuverings, swordfights, and a Lovecraftian horror all without losing a hint of his arrogance or smug assurances.

The final novella, Walt and Emily, follows Emily Dickinson and Walt Whitman's blossoming love as they join a spiritualist and scientific expedition into the afterlife. More than either of the previous stories, "Walt and Emily" delights in literary references and games. The story is saturated with poetic quotations and the unrepentant silly fun not only of a love story between Dickinson and Whitman but the idea of them visiting the afterlife.
