= List of PC-FX games =

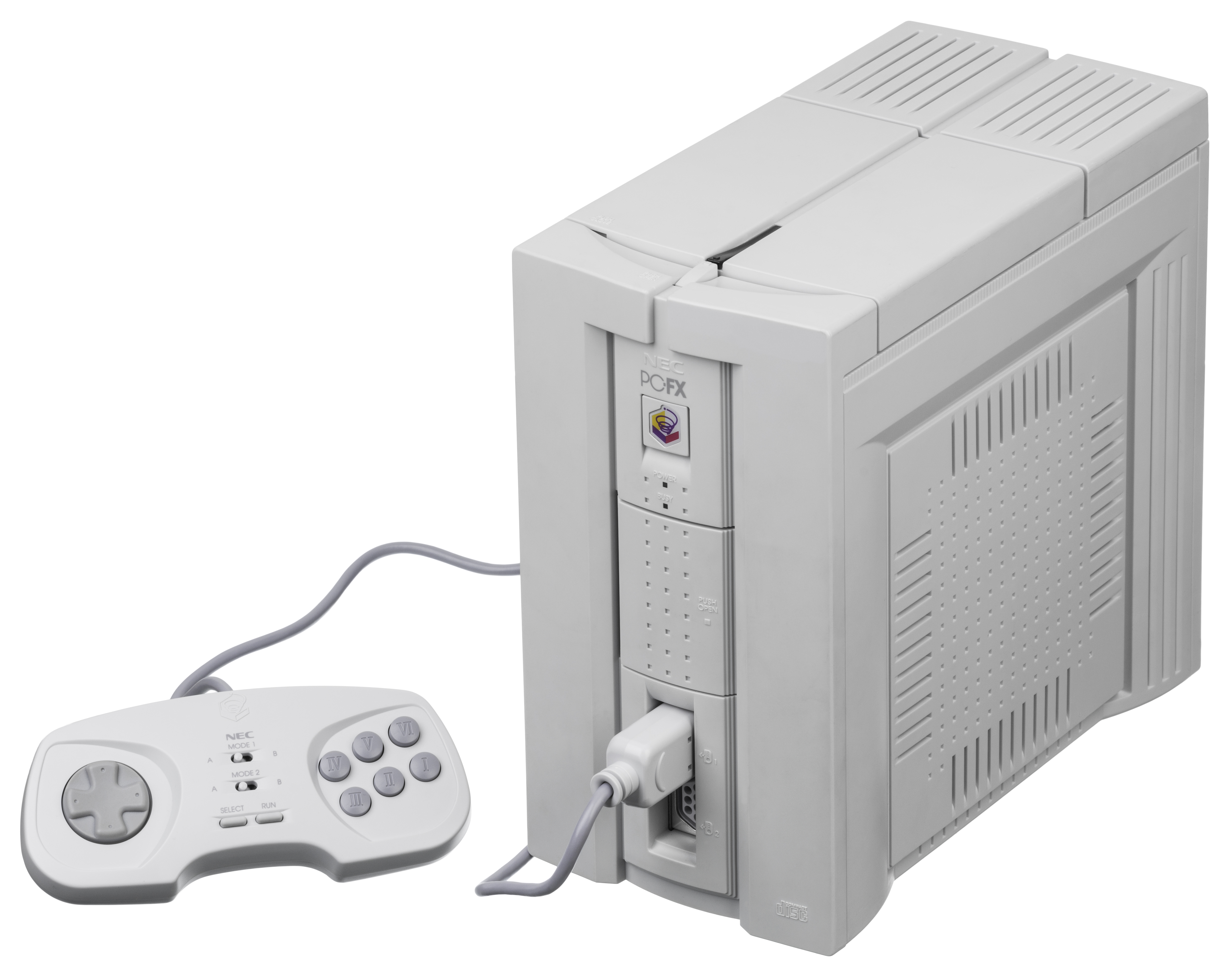
The PC-FX console

The PC-FX is a 32-bit home video game console developed and designed by NEC that was only released in Japan on 23 December 1994. It is the successor to the PC Engine, also known as TurboGrafx-16 in North America and TurboGrafx in Europe. The following list contains all of the games released for the PC-FX.

Announced in late 1993 and released just a few weeks after the PlayStation and a month after the Sega Saturn in the region, the PC-FX is unique among fifth generation consoles for its computer-like design, full motion video capabilities, and lack of a 3D graphics processor. The system was discontinued in early 1998 and sold only 400,000 units over its lifetime. It was also NEC's last home video game console released to market. The launch titles were Battle Heat!, Sotsugyō II: Neo Generation FX and Team Innocent: The Point of No Return, with its final game released being First Kiss Story.

== Games ==
Listed here are all 55 (Note: This number is always up to date by this script.) officially released PC-FX games.

Title	Genre(s)	Developer(s)	Publisher(s)	Release date
Aa! Megami-sama!	Visual Novel	HuneX	NEC Home Electronics	12 December 1997
Akazukin Cha-Cha: Osawagase! Panic Race!	Board game	NEC Home Electronics	NEC Home Electronics	25 October 1996
Albarea no Otome	Adventure, Simulation	Gimmick House, Magical Craft	NEC Home Electronics	27 June 1997
Angelique Special	Adventure, Dating sim	Koei	NEC Home Electronics	22 December 1995
Angelique Special 2	Adventure, Dating sim	Koei	NEC Home Electronics	20 December 1996
Angelique: Tenkū no Requiem	Role-playing game	Koei	NEC Home Electronics	2 April 1998
Battle Heat!	Fighting	Hudson Soft	Hudson Soft	23 December 1994
Blue Breaker: Ken yori mo hohoemi o	Role-playing game	HuneX	NEC Home Electronics	27 September 1996
Boundary Gate: Daughter of Kingdom	Role-playing game	Pack-In-Video, Polestar, Studio OX	NEC Home Electronics	24 January 1997
Can Can Bunny Extra DX	Visual novel, Eroge	Cocktail Soft	Cocktail Soft, NEC Home Electronics	27 September 1996
Chip Chan Kick!	Action	Custom Co., Ltd.	NEC Home Electronics	13 September 1996
Chōjin Heiki Zeroigar	Shoot 'em up	Fupac, Sugeiya Ltd., Winds Co., Ltd.	NEC Home Electronics	8 August 1997
Comic Road	Life simulation	Studio Offside	NEC Home Electronics	26 September 1997
Cutie Honey FX	Adventure, Eroge	Data West	NEC Home Electronics	5 November 1995
Dōkyūsei 2	Dating sim	ELF Corporation	NEC Avenue	8 August 1996
Dragon Knight 4	Role-playing game, Strategy	ELF Corporation	NEC Avenue	28 March 1997
Farland Story FX	Strategy, Tactical role-playing game	Technical Group Laboratory	NEC Home Electronics	8 November 1996
Fire Woman: Matoi-gumi	Dating Sim, Adventure	HuneX	Tokuma Shoten Publishing	20 December 1996
First Kiss Story	Visual novel	HuneX	NEC Home Electronics	24 April 1998
Fushigi no Kuni no Angelique	Board game	Koei	NEC Home Electronics	11 October 1996
Ginga Ojōsama Densetsu Yuna FX: Kanashimi no Sirene	Adventure, Visual novel	Red Entertainment, Will Co., Ltd.	Hudson	8 March 1996
J.B. Harold Blue Chicago Blues	Adventure, Visual novel	Riverhillsoft	NEC Home Electronics	22 March 1996
Kishin Dōji Zenki FX: Vajra Fight	Action, Beat 'em up	Hudson Soft	Hudson Soft	22 December 1995
Kokū Hyōryū Nirgends	Adventure, Combat flight simulation	Micro Cabin	NEC Home Electronics	28 June 1996
Konpeki no Kantai	Turn-based strategy	Micro Cabin	NEC Home Electronics	31 March 1995
Der Langrisser FX	Strategy, Tactical role-playing game	Crosstalk Inc., NCS Corporation	NEC Home Electronics	26 April 1996
Last Imperial Prince	Action, Role-playing game	Nihon Application	NEC Home Electronics	14 March 1997
Lunatic Dawn FX	Role-playing game	Artdink	NEC Home Electronics	24 November 1995
Mahjong Gokū Tenjiku	Board game	Chat Noir	NEC Home Electronics	24 March 1995
Makeruna! Makendō Z	Role-playing game	Fill-in-Cafe, Sugeiya Ltd.	NEC Home Electronics	20 March 1998
Megami Tengoku II	Life simulation	HuneX	NEC Home Electronics	26 July 1996
Minimum Nanonic	Adventure, Visual novel	Polestar, Studio OX	NEC Home Electronics	24 October 1997
Miraculum: The Last Revelation	Role-playing game	RayForce Inc.	NEC Home Electronics	29 March 1996
Ojōsama Sōsamō	Adventure, Puzzle	Fill-in-Cafe, Headroom	NEC Home Electronics	31 May 1996
Pachio-kun FX: Maboroshi no Shima Daikessen	Casino	Coconuts Japan Entertainment	NEC Home Electronics	22 September 1995
Pia Carrot e Yōkoso	Dating Sim, Eroge, Visual novel	HuneX	Cocktail Soft, NEC Home Electronics	23 May 1997
Power DoLLS FX	Strategy	Kogado Studio	NEC Home Electronics	23 February 1996
Return to Zork	Adventure	Activision, Data West	NEC Home Electronics	27 May 1995
Ruruli Ra Rura	Platform, Puzzle	NEC Home Electronics	NEC Home Electronics	20 February 1998
Shanghai: The Great Wall	Puzzle	Activision	ASK Kodansha	15 March 1996
Sotsugyō II: Neo Generation FX	Life simulation	Headroom, Riverhillsoft, Tenky Co., Ltd.	NEC Home Electronics	23 December 1994
Sotsugyō R: Graduation Real	Life simulation	Headroom	NEC Avenue, NEC Home Electronics	16 January 1998
Sparkling Feather	Turn-based strategy	HuneX	NEC Home Electronics	25 April 1997
Super Power League FX	Sports	Hudson Soft	Hudson Soft	26 April 1996
Super Real Mahjong PV	Board game, Eroge	SETA Corporation	Naxat Soft	29 March 1996
Team Innocent: The Point of No Return	Action, Adventure	Hudson Soft	Hudson Soft	23 December 1994
Tekipaki: Working Love FX	Adventure, Life simulation	Studio Offside	NEC Home Electronics	27 March 1998
Tenchi Muyō!: Ryō-ōki FX	Adventure, Visual novel	AIC Spirits, TamTam	NEC Interchannel	12 July 1996
Tengai Makyō: Dennō Karakuri Kakutōden	Fighting	Produce, Red Entertainment	Hudson Soft	28 July 1995
Tokimeki Card Paradise: Koi no Royal Straight Flush	Casino, Eroge	Sonnet Computer Entertainment	Sonnet Computer Entertainment	26 January 1996
Tonari no Princess Rolfee!	Adventure, Life simulation	Fupac, Winds Co., Ltd.	NEC Home Electronics	25 July 1997
Voice Paradise	Adventure, Educational	ASK-Kodansha, Fill-in Cafe	NEC Home Electronics	17 May 1996
Wakusei Kōgekitai: Little Cats	Simulation, Strategy	Family Soft	NEC Home Electronics	4 July 1997
Zen-Nihon Joshi Pro Wrestling: Queen of Queens	Fighting, Sports	HuneX	NEC Home Electronics	24 March 1995
Zoku Hatsukoi Monogatari: Shūgaku Ryokō	Dating Sim, Adventure, Visual novel	Tokuma Shoten Intermedia, Winds Co., Ltd.	NEC Home Electronics	6 June 1996

== Magazines ==
Listed here are all 11 (Note: This number is always up to date by this script.) officially released, various PC-FX magazine and their volumes. Please note, the list includes one Non-PC-FX volume.

Title	Volume	Developer(s)	Publisher(s)	Release date
Anime Freak FX	1	HuneX	NEC Home Electronics	12 August 1995
Anime Freak FX	2	HuneX	NEC Home Electronics	22 December 1995
Anime Freak FX	3	HuneX	NEC Home Electronics	5 April 1996
Anime Freak FX	4	HuneX	NEC Home Electronics	28 February 1997
Anime Freak FX	5	HuneX	NEC Home Electronics	29 August 1997
Anime Freak FX	6	HuneX	NEC Home Electronics	27 February 1998
PC Engine Fan	Special CD-ROM 1 (Note: was released for PC-Engine, NOT PC-FX; listed here for clarity)	—	Tokuma Shoten	1 August 1996
PC Engine Fan	Special CD-ROM 2	—	Tokuma Shoten	1 September 1996
PC Engine Fan	Special CD-ROM 3	—	Tokuma Shoten	1 October 1996
Super PC Engine Fan Deluxe	Special CD-ROM 1	—	Tokuma Shoten	1 December 1996
Super PC Engine Fan Deluxe	Special CD-ROM 2	—	Tokuma Shoten	20 May 1997
