= Zenki =

Japanese manga series

鬼神童子ゼンキ (Kishin Dōji Zenki)
- Manga
- Written by: Kikuhide Tani
- Illustrated by: Yoshihiro Kuroiwa
- Published by: Shueisha
- Magazine: Monthly Shōnen Jump
- Original run: December 1992 – September 1996
- Volumes: 12
- Anime television series
- Directed by: Junji Nishimura
- Produced by: Chiyoko Asakura; Shuji Imai; Noriko Kobayashi
- Written by: Ryōta Yamaguchi
- Music by: Gouji Tsuno
- Studio: Studio Deen
- Licensed by: NA: Media Blasters
- Original network: TXN (TV Tokyo)
- Original run: January 9, 1995 – December 25, 1995
- Episodes: 51
- Original video animation

Kishin Dōji Zenki Gaiden: Anki Kitan
- Directed by: Junji Nishimura
- Produced by: Takahiro Inagaki; Kazuo Kogure
- Written by: Ryōta Yamaguchi
- Music by: Gouji Tsuno
- Studio: Studio Deen
- Released: March 21, 1997
- Runtime: 35 minutes
- icon

Zenki (Japanese: 鬼神童子 ZENKI, Hepburn: Kishin Dōji Zenki; lit. "Demon God Child Zenki") is a Japanese manga series written by Kikuhide Tani and illustrated by Yoshihiro Kuroiwa. It was introduced and serialized in the Shueisha's Monthly Shōnen Jump magazine from December 1992 to September 1996. Zenki was adapted into a 51-episode anime television series in 1995 and a single original video animation in 1997 by Studio Deen and also received five video games. Media Blasters handles the English language version of the anime and its distribution rights.

== Synopsis ==
Long long ago, the great Bodhisattva of Japan, Ozunu Enno (役 小角, Enno Ozunu), controlled the Demon Gods to defeat the Demon Goddess Karuma. After Karuma's defeat, he sealed away one of his most powerful demon gods, Zenki (前鬼), in a pillar until needed again.

Centuries later, his direct descendant, a school girl named Chiaki Enno (役 小明, Enno Chiaki) (or Cherry Night in some dubs) is able to free Zenki, although the fierce demon lord currently has the form of a bratty demon child. To transform this extremely defiant demon into the form that made him useful by her ancestor, she uses a bracelet that appeared on her wrist when servants of Karuma broke the seal that imprisoned a seed of Karuma. Zenki reawakens because the seeds of Karuma (which look like eyeballs) start appearing and strange phenomena begin to occur as people with evil desires transform into wild beings akin to monsters. Once again, Zenki is needed to eradicate this growing menace.

== Characters ==
=== Main characters ===
Zenki
Voiced by: Jurota Kosugi (big), Kappei Yamaguchi (little) (Japanese); Robert Buchholz (big), Peter Doyle (little) (English)
Zenki is among Enno Ozunu's most powerful warriors: the Demon God of Crimson Thunder, his power is mainly sourced from Thunder and Fire. In the early episodes, Chiaki needed to use the bracelet to transform Zenki into his true form—a giant defiant Demon Lord and a force to be reckoned with in battles. Zenki is undoubtedly powerful, yet rebellious. He can be quite reckless and naive, takes no one's order, and often prefers brawn over brains. In some cases, however, Zenki's anger allows him to transform into his true self. With the help of the bracelet and Goki (後鬼), Zenki's most faithful comrade, Chiaki is able to transform him into the Ultimate Demon Warrior. The bracelet is no longer necessary when Chiaki attains higher power in the final episode of the anime, after the bracelet is severely damaged, though this does not happen in the manga. Zenki loves eating the Karuma Seeds and switches to bananas when there's no seed.
Chiaki Enno
Voiced by: Chisa Yokoyama (Japanese); Michelle Ruff (English)
Chiaki Enno is a normal highschool girl, living in a shrine with her grandmother Saki (or lives alone as in the manga). Chiaki takes care of the shrine, and often wears a priestess outfit. She is the direct descendant of Ozunu Enno, the great Bodhisattva who had the power to harness the Demon Gods and fought against evil. Chiaki is also able to turn Zenki into his true Demon God form, casting powerful spells and increase the strength of Zenki. She also managed to summon a small fluffy lovely Guardian Spirit, Lulupapa, who is the mascot of the team.
Her parents are working abroad and hence do not appear in the anime. Chiaki is kind, honest and has a good heart. She believes in people and wants to protect them. Chiaki has three dear friends at school (Sayaka, Ako, and Ayame). She gets along very well with Akira/Goki (from season 2 onwards) but often quarrels with Zenki as though he were her little brother, mostly because he is disobedient and shows no respect to other people. The bond between the trio becomes powerful and indestructible in later chapters when they face the evil together.
Goki/Akira Gotou
Voiced by: Megumi Ogata (Japanese); Joshua Seth (English)
Goki is among Enno Ozunu's most powerful warriors: the Demon God of Azure Light, of Protection and Revival. He was Zenki's most faithful comrade in the past, and has now reincarnated in the form of a human boy named Akira Gotou (or Gokimaru as in the manga), though without most of his elemental powers [Aether-Earth-Water-Fire-Wind]. Goki's deep love for humanity has resulted in his union with a mortal and got several half-demon kids together with her, which marked the beginning of his bloodline on Earth more than a thousand years ago. Goki is wise, kind, well-mannered and fiercely loyal to the Enno lineage. Despite his limited power in present days, he acts as Chiaki's mentor/best friend and is greatly supportive of his new master, always there to protect her, Zenki and their friends at the expense of his life. He is a martial artist, loves making sculptures and drawing, and is known as the Peace-loving Demon Guardian Warrior God.

=== Supporting characters ===
Karuma
Voiced by: Yuri Amano (Japanese); Jessica Gee (English)
The Queen of Darkness. She wanted to dominate earth with the Seeds of Darkness. The great Ozunu and his demon gods defeated her once, but she returned in a monstrous form. Zenki is able to kill her with the Diamond Dragon Axe at first and finally his Rudora.
Anju
Voiced by: Megumi Ogata (Japanese); Dorothy Elias-Fahn (English)
One of the minions of Karuma. She was originally human but Karuma brainwashed her. Karuma put the Seed of Darkness in Anju's forehead to make her a monster. When the monster Anju became stronger, Zenki had no choice but to kill her with his Rudra.
Guren / Gulen / Glenn
Voiced by: Keiichi Nanba (Japanese); Peter Doyle (English)
One of the minions of Karuma. Just as Zenki used the Diamond Axe to kill him, Goura used his magic at the same time. Guren was resurrected by Karuma so he could reveal Goura's betrayal. In the final battle between him and Zenki, Zenki finally killed Guren.
Goura / Goula
Voiced by: Shigezou Sasaoka (Japanese); Richard Epcar (English)
One of the minions of Karuma. He had planned to betray Karuma, and when Guren revealed this, Karuma killed Goura for being a traitor.
Hirumaki
Voiced by: Keiichi Nanba (Japanese); Dan Lorge (English)
A henchman of Inugami. Hirumaki is actually a minion of Kagetora sent to spy on Inugami. When the other half of Hirumaki's body was destroyed by Inugami, Kagetora gave him a Seed of Karuma to turn him into a monster, but Zenki killed him afterwards.
Kabura
Voiced by: Masashi Sugawara (Japanese); Richard Epcar (English)
One of the minions of Kagetora. He almost defeated Zenki in their battle, but Inugami arrived and killed him instead.
Nagi
Voiced by: Kotono Mitsuishi (Japanese); Cindy Robinson (English)
One of the minions of Kagetora. She used the Karuma Seed to turn herself into a monster. She was defeated by Zenki. Kagetora became angry at her for her loss and killed her despite her deep affection for him.
Kagetora
Voiced by: Kouji Tsujitani (Japanese); Richard Cansino (English)
The general of the World of Death. He revived the Grand Lord of the World of Death, only for the Grand Lord to turn on him and kill him.
Inugami
Voiced by: Kazuya Ichijo (anime), Takehito Koyasu (PC-FX game) (Japanese); Steve Staley (English)
Also known as the Dog Deity—the prince of the World of the Dead and son of En-gai. As such he never knew he had a human mother. When his mother was pulled back into the Realm of the Dead, Inugami used 3 Karuma Seeds to turn himself into a monster in order to kill his enemies. When he was defeated and nearly dead, Inugami went to the Realm of the Dead to ask his mother for help, and he came back to help Zenki defeat the Grand Lord.
Kokutei
Inugami's pet wolf. He became a Grand Lord in the final episodes. He was defeated by Zenki, Goki, Chiaki and Inugami. He turned back into a wolf at the end of the series.

== Media ==
=== Manga ===
Written by Kikuhide Tani and illustrated by Yoshihiro Kuroiwa, the Kishin Dōji Zenki manga was serialized by Shueisha's Monthly Shōnen Jump from the December 1992 to the September 1996 issues. Its chapters were collected in 12 tankōbon volumes, released from June 1993 to December 1996. Takeshobo later republished the series in seven bunkoban volumes, under their Bamboo Comics label, from July 27 to October 27, 2005.

=== Anime ===
51 episodes were produced and broadcast on TV Tokyo in 1995. Studio Deen animated the series, while Kitty Films produced it. The anime was first licensed in the west by Central Park Media under their Software Sculptors label in a subtitled only release on VHS, covering only the first 13 episodes. The US licensing rights for the anime later went to Media Blasters, who released it under their Anime Works label. They released all 51 episodes split across four DVD volumes in a dubbed and subtitled format from September 25, 2001, to September 30, 2003.

An original video animation (OVA) followup was released in 1997, with a runtime of 35 minutes and has a much darker tone in contrast to the TV series. Unlike the TV series, the Anki Kitan OVA was never licensed for a US release.

=== Video games ===
The Zenki series would receive five video games based on the franchise which were only released in Japan. Three games were released on the Super Famicom, one on Sega's Game Gear and one on NEC's PC-FX.

The first game released was Kishin Douji Zenki: Rettou Raiden for the on August 4, 1995. The game was developed by CAProduction and published by Hudson Soft.

The second action platforming game was simply titled Kishin Douji Zenki and was released on the Game Gear on September 1, 1995.

The third game (and second on the Super Famicom) was Kishin Douji Zenki: Den'ei Raibu which was developed by Now Production and published by Hudson Soft on November 24, 1995.

The fourth game was Kishin Dōji Zenki FX: Vajra Fight which was released on NEC's PC-FX on December 22, 1995, being published and developed by Hudson Soft.
