= Vitamin (video game series) =

Japanese video game series

- Genre: Otome, adventure
- Video game

VitaminX
- Publisher: D3 Publisher
- Genre: Otome, dating sim, visual novel
- Platform: PlayStation 2
- Released: JP: March 29, 2007
- Video game

VitaminX Evolution
- Publisher: D3 Publisher
- Genre: Otome, dating sim, visual novel
- Platform: Nintendo DS
- Released: JP: March 27, 2008
- Video game

VitaminX Evolution Plus
- Publisher: D3 Publisher
- Genre: Otome, dating sim, visual novel
- Platform: PlayStation Portable, Nintendo 3DS, PlayStation Vita
- Released: JP: September 9, 2010, JP: January 16, 2014, JP: February 22, 2018
- Video game

VitaminR
- Publisher: D3 Publisher
- Genre: Otome, dating sim, visual novel
- Platform: PlayStation Portable
- Released: JP: August 8, 2013
- Video game

VitaminY
- Publisher: D3 Publisher
- Genre: Otome, mini games
- Platform: Nintendo DS
- Released: JP: October 30, 2008
- Video game

VitaminZ
- Publisher: D3 Publisher
- Genre: Otome, dating sim, visual novel
- Platform: PlayStation 2
- Released: JP: March 26, 2009
- Video game

VitaminZ Revolution
- Publisher: D3 Publisher
- Genre: Otome, dating sim, visual novel
- Platform: PlayStation Portable, 3DS
- Released: JP: March 25, 2010, JP: December 12, 2013
- Original video animation

VitaminX Addiction
- Directed by: Keiichiro Kawaguchi
- Written by: StoryWorks
- Studio: Nomad
- Released: 26 August 2011 – 21 October 2011
- Runtime: 25 minutes (each)
- Episodes: 3
- Video game

VitaminZ Graduation
- Publisher: D3 Publisher
- Genre: Otome, dating sim, visual novel
- Platform: PlayStation Portable
- Released: JP: January 31, 2013
- Video game

VitaminXtoZ
- Publisher: D3 Publisher
- Genre: Otome, dating sim, visual novel
- Platform: PlayStation Portable
- Released: JP: February 24, 2011
- Video game

VitaminX: Detective B6
- Publisher: D3 Publisher
- Genre: Otome, dating sim, visual novel
- Platform: PlayStation Portable
- Released: JP: February 9, 2012
- Video game

VitaminX Destination
- Publisher: D3 Publisher
- Genre: Otome, dating sim, visual novel
- Platform: PlayStation Vita
- Released: JP: February 22, 2018

Vitamin is a series of otome games developed by HuneX and published by D3 Publisher for PlayStation 2, Nintendo DS, Nintendo 3DS, PlayStation Portable, and PlayStation Vita. The first title, VitaminX, was released on March 29, 2007 for PlayStation 2.

A series of official skins were released for the PSP-3000.

A special cafe event, where goods were sold, was held from January 10 to 18, 2015. A different cafe campaign was held in collaboration with iCafe the previous year.

VitaminX Destination, a 2018 PlayStation Vita release following the tenth anniversary of the series, received a Famitsu rating of 8.0.

On April 15, 2018, an event called VitaminX Ikuze! Muteki (Miracle) * Destination (VitaminX いくぜっ! 無敵（ミラクル）★デスティネーション) was held at the Maihama Amphitheatre celebrating the 10th anniversary of the series, with cast members (including Daisuke Ono) having a talk session, doing quizzes, and performing songs.

== Titles ==
- Vitamin X and limited edition box set (March 29, 2007, PS2)
- Vitamin X Evolution (March 27, 2008, NDS)
- Vitamin X Evolution Plus and limited edition box set (September 9, 2010, PSP; January 16, 2014 for 3DS; February 22, 2018 for Vita download version)
- Vitamin R and limited edition box set (August 8, 2013, PSP)
- Mune Kyun Otome Collection Vol. 1: Vitamin X Evolution Plus (July 31, 2014, PSP) A limited promotional clear file was given away with the purchase of this version, which was part of a budget series of re-released otome games.
- Mune Kyun Otome Collection Vol. 2: Vitamin X Detective B6 (July 31, 2014, PSP) A limited promotional clear file was given away with the purchase of this version, which was part of a budget series of re-released otome games.
- Mune Kyun Otome Collection Vol. 3: Vitamin X to Z (July 31, 2014, PSP) A limited promotional clear file was given away with the purchase of this version, which was part of a budget series of re-released otome games.
- Mune Kyun Otome Collection Vol.6: Vitamin Z Revolution (August 7, 2014, PSP)
- Mune Kyun Otome Collection Vol. 7: Vitamin Z Graduation (August 7, 2014, PSP)
- Vitamin Y (October 30, 2008, NDS)
- Vitamin Z and limited edition box set (March 26, 2009, PS2)
- Vitamin Z Revolution and limited edition box set (March 25, 2010, PSP; December 12, 2013 for 3DS)
- Vitamin Z Graduation and limited edition box set (January 31, 2013, PSP)
- Vitamin X to Z and limited edition box set (February 24, 2011, PSP)
- Vitamin X: Detective B6 and limited edition box set (February 9, 2012, PSP)
- Vitamin X Destination (February 22, 2018, Vita)

== Characters/cast ==
=== VitaminX Evolution ===
Tsubasa Makabe (真壁翼) － Tatsuhisa Suzuki

Hajime Kusanagi (草薙一) － Daisuke Ono

Shun Nanase (七瀬瞬) － Kohsuke Toriumi

Kiyoharu Sendo (仙道清春) － Hiroyuki Yoshino

Goro Fumonji (風門寺悟郎) － Daisuke Kishio

Mizuki Madarame (斑目瑞希) － Hisayoshi Suganuma

Ginji Katsuragi (葛城銀児) － Tomokazu Sugita

Kōji Ōtori (鳳晃司) － Kazuhiko Inoue

Tarō Kukage (九影太郎) － Kenta Miyake

Hitoshi Nikaido (二階堂衝) － Yūsei Oda

Shōjirō Kinugasa (衣笠正次郎) － Kōki Miyata

Masaki Sanada (真田正輝) － Daisuke Sakaguchi

== Original Video Animation ==
The OVA was released in 2011 as a three-volume series (DVD only) under the title "VitaminX Addiction".

It was broadcast on TOKYO MX on December 27, 2013, and January 10th and 17th, 2014, but some scenes were cut due to broadcast time constraints.

== Music CDs ==
- VitaminX Original Soundtrack（KDSD-00132）
- RED DISK *Limited time sale item
- BLUE DISC *Limited time sale item
- Character CD
  - SILVER DISC *-Katsuragi Ginji & Kinugasa Shōjirō & Sanada Masaki- (-葛城銀児&衣笠正次郎&真田正輝-)*（KDSD-00148）
  - GOLD DISC *-Ōtori Kōji & Nikaido Hitoshi & Kukage Taro- (-鳳晃司&二階堂衝＆九影太郎-)*（KDSD-00147）
  - DIAMOND DISC *-Tsubasa to Hajime- (-翼と一-)*（KDSD-00149）
  - SAPPHIRE DISC -GAM。- (KDSD-228)
  - RUBY DISC -Nanakiyo- (KDSD-00215)
  - Best Album 〜GREATEST HITS〜(Regular version KDSD-00245, first press )
- *Shudaiuta「Mayonaka Chuu Kyuseishu -Midnight Salvatore-/Tsubasa to Hajime (主題歌「真夜中救世主-ミッドナイトサルヴァトーレ-」/翼と一)*（KDSD-00185）限定版KDSD-00243-244）
- *OAD VitaminX Addiction Senko Character Song (OAD VitaminX Addiction 先行キャラクターソング)*
  - vol.1 *Datenshi Honey/Makabe Tsubasa (「堕天使ハニー」/真壁翼)* (LACM-4781)
  - vol.2 *100V no Ai Shougeki/Kusanagi Hajime (「100Vの愛衝撃」/草薙一)* (LACM-4782)
  - vol.3 *RightNow、RightLove!/Nanase Shun (「RightNow、RightLove!」/七瀬瞬)* (LACM-4786)
  - vol.4 *Genkai Nightmare/Sendo Kiyoharu (「限界ナイトメア」/仙道清春)* (LACM-4787)
  - Vol.5 *「Romantic Metamorphoze」/Fumonji Goro (「Romantic Metamorphoze」/風門寺悟郎)* (LACM-4793)
  - Vol.6 *Netsuretsu LIPS/Mizuki Madarame (「熱烈LIPS」/斑目瑞希)* (LACM-4794)
- OAD VitaminX Addiction
  - *Act.1 ED Gakuen (Daydream) Frontier/Tsubasa & Hajime (Act.1 ED Gakuen (Daydream) Frontier/翼&一)*(LACM-4841)
  - *Act.2 ED「Yuujo(ULTI∞MATE)VOLCANO」/Shun & Kiyoharu (Act.2 ED「友情(ULTI∞MATE)VOLCANO」/瞬&清春)*(LACM-4851)
  - *Act.2 Sonyu Uta「KEEP OUT」Shuroku Single JUSTxxx/Visconti (Act.2 挿入歌「KEEP OUT」収録シングル「JUSTxxx」/Visconti)* (LACM-4852)
  - Act.3 ED Seishun Happiness/Goro & Mizuki (LACM-4853)
- *VitaminX Addiction Kogyo Character Song Album Returns -Kaettekita T6- (VitaminX Addiction 後行キャラクターソングアルバム リターンズ-帰ってきたT6-)* (LACA-15163)
- *PSP Ban VitaminX Detective B6 Shudaiuta Tantei√CODE/Tsubasa to Hajime (PSP版 VitaminX Detective B6 主題歌「探偵√CODE」/翼と一)* (D3PR-25)
- *VitaminX Character Song CD That’s Entertainment! B6&T6SHOW #1 (VitaminX Character Song CD That’s エンターテイメント! B6&T6SHOW #1)*
  - #1 *~Tsubasa to Katsuragi/Hajime to Otori~ (～翼と葛城/一と鳳～)* (D3PR-29)
  - #2 *~Shun to Kukage/Kiyoharu to Kinugasa~ (～瞬と九影/清春と衣笠～)* (D3PR-31)
  - #3 *~Goro to Nikaido/Mizuki to Sanada~ (～悟郎と二階堂/瑞希と真田～)* (D3PR-33)
  - #4 *~VitaminX no Theme/Nagata~ (～VitaminXのテーマ/永田～)* (D3PR-35)
- Memories of Vitamin ～opening&ending music box～(D3PR-39)

=== Drama CDs ===
- Ultra Vitamin
  - 1（KDSD-00133）
  - 2*Maximum Baka (Vitamin) (Maximum馬鹿（ビタミン）)*
  - 3*Saigo? no Warasen (最後?の笑戦)* （KDSD-00217）
  - LOST Vitamin~Amakute H na Vitamin-zai (LOST Vitamin〜甘くてHなビタミン剤〜)*
  - PART1（VGCD-0088）
  - *PART2~Chuchu Henka B Rokuno Ukihashi (PART2～忠々変化B六乃浮橋)* (VGCD-0140）
- *Dramatic CD Collection VitaminX Love Vitamin (Dramatic CD Collection VitaminX ラブビタミン)*
  - 1*~Nemuri Hime Scramble~ (〜眠り姫スクランブル〜）)* （MACY-2150）
  - 2*~White Day Kurai Shisu?~ (〜ホワイトデーくらいしす？〜)* （MACY-2154）
- Dramatic CD Collection VitaminX
  - 1*Honey Vitamin ~Shirayuki-hime Forever~ (ハニービタミン〜白雪姫フォーエバー〜)*（MACY-2158）
  - 2*Naisho no Fairy Tale (～内緒のフェアリーテール～)* (MACY-2167)
- *Perfect Vitamin! Time Travel Combination (「Perfect Vitamin!・タイムトラベル・こんびねーしょん」)* Limited time sale item
- VANQUISH FORBIDDEN∞LOVE（KDSD-00200）
- *Dramatic CD Collection VitaminX Delicious Vitamin (Dramatic CD Collection VitaminX・デリシャスビタミン)*
  - 1*Dokidoki Love Trouble (〜ドキドキ★ラブトラブル〜)* (MACY-2179)
  - 2*Dokidoki Love Travel (〜トキメキ★ラブトラベル〜)* (MACY-2182)
- *VitaminX-Z Drama CD SADISTIC SIDE (VitaminX-Z ドラマCD SADISTIC SIDE)* (VGCD-173)
- *VitaminX-Z ~Himitsu Kurabu de Tsukamaete ～MASOCHISTIC SIDE～ (VitaminX-Z「～秘密倶楽部でつかまえて～MASOCHISTIC SIDE～」)* (VGCD-174)
- *Hyper Vitamin ~Tokimeki Water Wars~ (ハイパービタミン ～ときめき★ウォーターウォーズ～)* (KDSD-00391)
- *Dramatic CD Collection VitaminX-Z Candy Vitamin (Dramatic CD Collection VitaminX-Z・キャンディビタミン)*
  - 1*~Tsubasa to Tenjuro Kimi ha Itsudemo Strawberry Kiss~ (～翼と天十郎 君はいつでもストロベリー・キッス～)* (MACY-2188)
  - 2*~Mizuki to Kei Imasugu Koko de Milky Sweet~ (～瑞希と慧 いますぐここでミルキースイート～)* (MACY-2189)
  - 3*~Hajime to Chisato Koi ha Sparkling Cola~ (～一と千聖 恋はスパークリング・コーラ～)* (MACY-2190)
  - 4*~Goro to Arata Me o Tojitara Chocolate Magic~ (～悟郎とアラタ 目を閉じたらチョコレート・マジック～)* (MACY-2191)
  - 5*~Shun to Yakumo Naisho no Orange Time~ (～瞬と八雲 内緒のオレンジ・タイム～)* (MACY-2194)
  - 6*~Kiyoharu to Nachi Koi ha Itsudemo Russian Tea~ (～清春と那智 恋はいつでもロシアンティー～)* (MACY-2195)
- Dramatic CD Collection VitaminX-Z・Cocktail Vitamin
  - 1*~Sanada to Kagami Kimi ha Little Princess~ (～真田と加賀美 君はリトルプリンセス～)* (MACY-2905)
  - 2*~Otori to Saeki Konya ha Oyasumi Last Kiss~ (～鳳と佐伯 今夜はお休みラストキッス～)* (MACY-2906)
  - 3*~Kukage to Kamijo Itoshi no White Lady~ (～九影と上條 愛しのホワイトレディ～)* (MACY-2907)
  - 4*~Nikaido to Kirioka Binetsu no Pina Colada~ (～二階堂と桐丘 微熱のピニャコラーダ～)* (MACY-2908)
  - 5*~Kinugasa to Tendo Kiss in the Dark~ (～衣笠と天童 キス・イン・ザ・ダーク～)* (MACY-2909)
  - 6*~Katsuragi Tokimeki no XYZ/Nagata Futari no Ose de La Vie en Rose~ (～葛城ときめきのXYZ/永田 2人の逢瀬でラヴィアンローズ～)* (MACY-2910)
- *VitaminX Addiction Senko Drama CD -30ppun de Wakaru VitaminX(ミニッツビタミン) (VitaminX Addiction 先行ドラマCD -30分で分かるVitaminX(ミニッツビタミン))* (LACA-15119)
- VitaminX Detective B6
  - Vol.1 (D3PPR-23)
  - Vol.2 (D3PR-24)
  - *~Torawareta Shocho o Dakkanseyo~ (～囚われた所長を奪還せよ～)* (KDSD-00538)
- VitaminX×*Yagi de Oyasumi Series (羊でおやすみシリーズ)*
  - Vol.1 *Togei to Issho ni Oyasumi (トゲーと一緒におやすみ)* (HO-0026)
  - Vol.2 *Kawano Ji de Oyasumi/Shukuchokushitsu de Oyasumi (川の字でおやすみ/宿直室でおやすみ)* (HO-0027)
  - Vol.3 *Nekonyan de Oyasumi/Mahou no Jumon de Oyasumi (猫にゃんでおやすみ/魔法の呪文でおやすみ)* (HO-0028)
  - Vol.4 *Tsubasa o Yasumete Oyasumi (翼を休めておやすみ)*(HO-0031)

=== DJ CDs ===
- Radio CD VitaminX RadioFiction Vol.1 (Regular edition:TBZR-23/Animate limited edition:TBZR-24)
- Radio CD VitaminX RadioFiction Vol.2 (Regular edition:TBZR-106/Animate limited edition:TBZR-107)
- Radio CD VitaminX RadioFiction Vol.3 (Regular edition:TBZR-110/Animate limited edition:TBZR-111)

=== DVD ===
- *VitaminX Ikuze! Tokimeki Full Burst Event (VitaminX いくぜっ！トキメキ★フルバースト イベント)* DVD
- *VitaminXtoZ Ikuze! Kyuukyoku (Hyper) Explosion Event (VitaminXtoZ いくぜ!究極(ハイパー)★エクスプローション イベント)* DVD
- *VitaminX Shuugaku Ryokou in Okinawa! Variety (VitaminX 修学旅行 in 沖縄! バラエティ)* DVD
- *Gekidan VitaminX Kouen (劇団VitaminX 公演)* DVD
- OAD VitaminX Addiction OAD DVD
  - Act.1
  - Act.2
  - Act.3
- *VitaminX Ikuze! Tokimeki Full Burst Repeat (VitaminX いくぜっ！トキメキ★フルバースト リピート)* DVD
- *VitaminX Ikuze! Gokujou (Ultra) Addiction Event (VitaminX いくぜっ! 極上(ウルトラ)★アディクション イベント)* DVD
- *VitaminX Ikuze! Kirameki Full Burst Oretachi ENDLESSX!! Event (VitaminX いくぜっ!キラメキ★フルバースト 俺たちENDLESSX!! イベント)* DVD
- 5th Anniversary Event of Vitamin Series DVD
- *VitaminX B6 Kinkyuu Meeting & Live!? Event (VitaminX B6緊急ミーティング＆ライブ!?イベント)* DVD

=== Books ===
- *VitaminX Official Visual Fanbook (VitaminX 公式ビジュアルファンブック)*（ISBN 9784757736054）
- Vitamin Vanity Collection
- *VitaminX Evolution Complete Guide (VitaminX Evolution コンプリートガイド)*（ISBN 9784757742123）
- *Manga VitaminX (漫画『VitaminX』)*（ISBN 9784757741140）
- *VitaminX Shiritsu Seitei Gakuen Seito Techou (VitaminX 私立聖帝学園生徒手帳)*（ISBN 9784757741294）
- *VitaminX Evolution Anthology Ikemen Kyoushi Jin Hen (VitaminX Evolutionアンソロジー イケメン教師陣編)*（ISBN 978-4904293010）
- *VitaminX Evolution VANQUISH Perfect Guidebook ~Mayonaka Chuu Seishu Another World~ (VitaminX Evolution VANQUISH パーフェクトガイドブック〜真夜中救世主アナザーワールド〜)*（ASIN B00158RBCQ）
- *VitaminY Official Visual Fanbook (VitaminY 公式ビジュアルファンブック)*（ISBN 978-4757747012）
- *VitaminX Series THE Official Fanbook (VitaminXシリーズ THE 公式ファンブック)*（ASIN B00M2DLUMK）
- *VitaminXtoZ Official Visual Fanbook (VitaminXtoZ 公式ビジュアルファンブック)*（ISBN 978-4047272514）
- *OAD VitaminX Addiction Official Fanbook (OAD VitaminX Addiction 公式ファンブック)*（ISBN 978-4391632040）

=== Applications ===
A mobile game titled VitaminX -Soine Kareshi- (-Sleep Together Boyfriend-), with optional packs for various characters, was released in 2012, and a second mobile title, Smartphone Kareshi (Smartphone Boyfriend) was released the following January. However, both of the applications appear to have since become unavailable.

- For iPhone
  - *VitaminX -Soine Kareshi- (*VitaminX -添い寝カレシ-)(Distribution started October 15, 2012) Microtransactions exist inside application
- For Android
  - VitaminX -Soine Kareshi- Makabe Tsubasa Hen (VitaminX -添い寝カレシ- 真壁翼編)* (Distribution started November 29, 2012)
  - VitaminX -Soine Kareshi- Kusanagi Hajime Hen (VitaminX -添い寝カレシ- 草薙一編)* (Distribution started February 8, 2013)
  - VitaminX -Soine Kareshi- Nanase Shun Hen (VitaminX -添い寝カレシ- 七瀬瞬編)* (Distribution started February 15, 2013)
  - VitaminX -Soine Kareshi- Sendo Kiyoharu Hen (VitaminX -添い寝カレシ- 仙道清春編)* (Distribution started February 25, 2013)
  - VitaminX -Soine Kareshi- Kazemonji Goro Hen (VitaminX -添い寝カレシ- 風門寺悟郎編)* (Distribution started February 28, 2013)
  - VitaminX -Soine Kareshi- Madarame Mizuki Hen (VitaminX -添い寝カレシ- 斑目瑞希編)* (Distribution started March 8, 2013)
- For both iPhone and Android
  - Smartphone Kareshi VitaminX (スマホカレシ VitaminX)* (Limited time distribution starting from January 29, 2013)
  - VitaminX LINE Stickers (Distribution started March 12, 2015)

=== Credit card ===
- As a collaboration with Mitsui Sumitomo Card, a credit card with a VitaminX design was released on February 22, 2010. On May 18, 2016, applications were opened for a new design. Campaigns were run for both cards.
