= Kishin Dōji Zenki FX: Vajra Fight =

1995 video game

- Developer: Hudson Soft
- Publisher: Hudson Soft
- Director: Kazunori Yasui
- Producer: Tadahiro Nakano
- Designer: Yūji Iwahara
- Programmer: Yūichi Itō
- Artists: Keisuke Kasahara; Mari Takeda; Masahiko Musha
- Writer: Yūji Iwahara
- Composers: Aya Tanaka; Minoru Endō
- Series: Zenki
- Platform: PC-FX
- Release: JP: 22 December 1995
- Genres: Action, beat 'em up, platform
- Modes: Single-player, multiplayer

Kishin Dōji Zenki FX: Vajra Fight (Note: Japanese: ヴァジュラファイト(鬼神童子ZENKI FX 金剛焱闘); lit. "Demon God Child Zenki FX: Vajra Fight") is a side-scrolling action-platform beat 'em up video game developed and published by Hudson Soft exclusively for the PC-FX in Japan on 22 December 1995. It is the fourth title to be based upon Kikuhide Tani and Yoshihiro Kuroiwa's Zenki shōnen manga and anime series, which is based on the Japanese folklore concerning the Great Bodhisattva Jinben Ozunu Enno, and it also has been compared with other titles in the same genre such as Taito's The Ninja Warriors and Treasure's Guardian Heroes. Following the second arc of the manga, which was later adapted into the anime, players assume the role of either Zenki or Chiaki Enno and fight against monsters across several locations in order to rescue a girl named Nozomi and protect Japan from the enemies.

Despite being exclusive to Japan along with the console, Kishin Dōji Zenki FX: Vajra Fight has been met with mixed to positive reception from critics who reviewed it as an import title since its release and was commended for the detailed presentation, colorful visuals and frenetic gameplay. However, its short length was heavily criticized by many. Over the years, the title has since become an expensive collector's item and one of the rarest in the PC-FX library, leading it to fetch high prices in the secondary video game collecting market, in addition to being regarded by publications like Retro Gamer as a standout game on the platform.

== Gameplay ==
Gameplay screenshot.

Kishin Dōji Zenki FX: Vajra Fight is a side-scrolling action-platform beat 'em up game reminiscent of The Ninja Warriors and Guardian Heroes, where the players assume the role of either Zenki or Chiaki Enno through various stages set on Japan in order to fight against several demonic beings known as the "Seeds of Karuma", as well as attempting to rescue a girl named Nozomi from said monsters. The gameplay structure is very similar to Alien Soldier, as stages are short and populated with weak enemies that serve as downtime between boss battles, which are a large emphasis the game puts on. Unlike the aforementioned title, however, a second player can join at any given time during the action and two players are able to play through the entire game.

The two playable protagonists behave in a different manner between each other; Zenki is a melee-oriented character who focuses on close-quarter physical attack, while Chiaki is a range-based character who attacks enemies with energy projectiles. Both characters also have a special move capable of inflicting heavy damage against enemies that is executed by collecting an item called Bracelet of Protection, but the resulting effect varies between which character picked it up first; If Zenki grabbed it, he transforms into his more powerful demon lord form, as well as increasing his offensive and defensive capabilities until he is defeated, however if Chiaki grabbed it, she invokes Zenki in his true demon lord form and performs a powerful dash attack against enemies. If the players lose all of their energy, the game is over, though there is the option of continuing playing with a limited number of credits. The players have access to the options menu at the title screen before starting the game, where various settings can be adjusted. By entering a cheat code at the title screen, players can also access a level select screen as well.

== Development and release ==
Kishin Dōji Zenki FX: Vajra Fight was developed by Hudson Soft for the PC-FX, becoming the fourth title to be based on the Zenki shōnen manga and anime series by Kikuhide Tani and Yoshihiro Kuroiwa, and it was published on 22 December 1995 with a retail price of JP¥7,800. The game has since become one of the rarest PC-FX titles, with copies of the game fetching over US$300 on the secondary video game collecting market.

== Reception and legacy ==
Reception

Aggregate score
| Aggregator | Score |
|---|---|
| GameRankings | 60% |

Review scores
| Publication | Score |
|---|---|
| Famitsu | 29/40 |
| GameFan | 255 / 300 |
| HonestGamers | 3/5 |

Although Kishin Dōji Zenki FX: Vajra Fight remained exclusive to Japan along with the PC-FX, the game has received mixed to positive reception since its release from critics who reviewed it as an import title. Nicholas Barres, Casey Loe and Dave Halverson of GameFan praised the visuals and gameplay but criticized the short length and intermission scenes. Zigfried of gaming website HonestGamers also praised the presentation, graphics, plot and music but criticized the gameplay for being sloppy and the short length as well.

In a retrospective review, Bruno Sol of Spanish video game magazine Superjuegos praised it for being a standout title in the PC-FX library, commending it for the gameplay and presentation. Likewise, Halverson praised its visuals, lack of loading times and dialogue in the March 2000 issue of Gamers' Republic. John Szczepaniak of Hardcore Gaming 101 regarded the visuals in a positive manner but criticized multiple flaws within the title, particularly the controls and length. Retro Gamer's Rory Milne praised the presentation, enemy encounters, audio, dialogue and frenetic action. Later in 2014, Retro Gamer regarded Kishin Dōji Zenki FX: Vajra Fight to be one of the best game for the console.
