= Industrial Spy: Operation Espionage =

1999 stealth video game

- Developer: HuneX
- Publishers: JP: NEC Home Electronics; NA: UFO Interactive Games
- Platform: Dreamcast
- Release: JP: September 30, 1999; NA: June 1, 2000
- Genre: Stealth
- Modes: Single-player, multiplayer

Industrial Spy: Operation Espionage or I Spy, known in Japan as Espion-Age-nts (エスピオネージェンツ, Esupionējentsu), is a video game developed by HuneX and published by NEC Home Electronics and UFO Interactive Games for Dreamcast in 1999-2000.

== Gameplay ==
Industrial Spy: Operation Espionage is a game in which the player oversees a team of ten operatives, each defined by a fixed set of skills that can be improved but not expanded. Missions involve industrial espionage tasks such as stealing information or technology. For each assignment, the player selects a smaller group of three or four agents whose abilities match the mission's needs and deploys them into the field. Rather than controlling characters directly, the player issues commands and sets behavioral parameters, allowing agents to act independently as they navigate mission environments. Objectives often require adjusting plans as situations change. After a brief tutorial, the game places players in charge of managing missions using the provided manual for reference. Progress frequently depends on determining the correct sequence of actions through repeated attempts. Choosing an unsuitable agent or insertion point can lead to early failure, while later missteps—such as closing a door or activating a switch—can trap the team or block progress. Each mission includes a map of the location, though agents may take unexpected routes when moving through the environment.

== Development ==
Development of the ideas for Industrial Spy: Operation Espionage (also known as Espionagents) began from May 1998, with the planning beginning from June 1998. Programming began from December 1998. The game was developed by thirty people.

In Japan, it was released on September 30, 1999.

== Reception ==
Reception

Aggregate score
| Aggregator | Score |
|---|---|
| GameRankings | 35% |

Review scores
| Publication | Score |
|---|---|
| AllGame | 1.5/5 |
| Electronic Gaming Monthly | 6/10 |
| GameSpot | 3.3/10 |
| GameSpy | 3/10 |
| IGN | 5/10 |
| Next Generation | 3/5 |

The game received unfavorable reviews according to the review aggregation website GameRankings. Jeff Lundrigan of NextGen said in an early review, "Industrial Spy isn't bad, by any means. The graphics are good, and many of the characters are more fleshed out than they first appear." GamePro said that the game's storyline "could've carried it far, but control problems and incredibly slow gameplay waste the concept." (Note: GamePro gave the game 4/5 for graphics, 3/5 for sound, 2/5 for control, and 2.5/5 for fun factor.)
