= Konpeki no Kantai =

Japanese alternate history franchise

- Kantai Series
- Cover of 1st. volume of Konpeki no Kantai

艦隊シリーズ
- Genre: Alternate history
- Novel series
- Written by: Yoshio Aramaki
- Published by: Tokuma Shoten
- Original run: 1990 – 1996
- Volumes: 20
- Novel series

Kyokujitsu no Kantai
- Written by: Yoshio Aramaki
- Published by: Chuokoron-Shinsha
- Original run: 1992 – 1997
- Volumes: 16
- Original video animation
- Directed by: Takeyuki Kanda; Hiromichi Matano
- Produced by: Hiromichi Matano; Osamu Sekita; Rei Mano; Takeshi Yamaguchi
- Written by: Yoshio Aramaki; Ryōsuke Takahashi
- Music by: Yasushi Tsuchida
- Studio: J.C.Staff
- Released: 1993 – 2003
- Runtime: 30–40 minutes
- Episodes: 32
- Video game
- Developer: MicroCabin
- Publisher: NEC Home Electronics
- Genre: Strategy
- Platform: PC-FX
- Released: March 31, 1995
- Video game
- Developer: MicroCabin
- Publisher: Tokuma Shoten
- Genre: Strategy
- Platform: 3DO
- Released: April 21, 1995
- Video game
- Developer: Access
- Publisher: Angel
- Genre: Strategy
- Platform: Super Famicom
- Released: November 2, 1995
- Original video animation

Kyokujitsu no Kantai
- Directed by: Hiromichi Matano
- Produced by: Takeshi Yamaguchi; Hideki Okamoto; Hirokazu Yamada
- Written by: Yoshio Aramaki; Ryousuke Takahashi; Yuichiro Takeda
- Music by: Yasushi Tsuchida
- Studio: J.C.Staff
- Released: 1997 – 2002
- Episodes: 15

Konpeki no Kantai (紺碧の艦隊; literally "Azure Armada") is a Japanese alternate history series produced by J.C.Staff. The series focuses on both a technologically advanced Imperial Japanese Navy and a radically-different World War II that were brought about by Admiral Isoroku Yamamoto's revival by unexplained circumstances. Both the published books and the original video animation (OVA) series are also notable for using the Imperial Japanese calendar, instead of the Western calendar, in denoting the years in which the events of the series take place. It also spawned a 1997 OVA side story, Kyokujitsu no Kantai (旭日の艦隊; literally "Fleet of the Rising Sun"), one manga sequel, and two turn-based strategy games for the PC-FX and the Super Famicom.

Konpeki no Kantai is based on a novel series written by Yoshio Aramaki, whose first volume was published in December 1990. The novel's popularity reportedly rose dramatically because of the start of the Gulf War the following month. Aramaki later wrote a different series, Kyokujitsu no Kantai (旭日の隊) (literally "Fleet of the Rising Sun"), elements of which were used in the OVA sequel. Both series eventually sold more than five million copies. Between 1997 and 2000, Aramaki wrote two sequel series: Shin Konpeki no Kantai (新・紺碧の艦隊, 9 volumes) and Shin Kyokujitsu no Kantai (新・旭日の艦隊, 18 volumes).

The title is a reference to the series depicting an advanced submarine force.

== Point of divergence ==
In the first episode, Admiral Isoroku Yamamoto's death still proceeds on April 18, 1943, just as in reality. Just before his damaged plane crashes into Bougainville Island, Yamamoto blacks out before he awakens in a ship quarters as his younger self. Unaware of what has just happened, Yamamoto speaks with a crewman and discovers that he is on board the Japanese cruiser Nisshin. He is then informed that the date is May 28, 1905, and that the Battle of Tsushima has just ended. Yamamoto discovers that he has somehow been transported back in time or to a parallel world.

With his memory from the original timeline intact, Yamamoto decides to revert to his old name of Isoroku Takano, and vows to use his advanced knowledge of the next 38 years to ensure that Japan does not make the same mistakes as in our timeline.

Yamamoto's first priority is to spearhead a massive naval construction program that involves building a large fleet of advanced battleships and supercarriers, nuclear submarines based on the design of the real-life I-400 Sen Toku submarine, and advanced combat aircraft that were in prototype or concept form during the late stages of the actual Pacific War.

His plan for success begins with a coup d'état against the hardline government of Imperial Japanese Army General Hideki Tōjō in late 1941, on the eve of the Pearl Harbor attack, and he installs an ally, Lieutenant General Yasaburō Otaka as prime minister. Otaka, who has also been transported back in time, agrees to work with Yamamoto to change history and ensure that the Japanese Empire emerges victorious against the United States in the Second World War.

=== Alternate Pearl Harbor attack ===
The first episode of the series depicts the Japanese attack on Pearl Harbor on December 7, 1941. Yamamoto uses his advanced knowledge of the future and the now-superior technology of the Imperial Japanese Navy to ensure that the strategy and the outcome of the attack are considerably different from in our timeline:

Alternate Depiction	Actual Events
Japan's declaration of war against the United States is delivered before the attack begins.	The slow decoding and translation of diplomatic cables from Tokyo make the Japanese embassy in Washington not deliver a written statement that peace talks had ended until after the attack had begun. The actual declaration of war was not made until the following evening.
The attack is launched before daybreak since Japan has perfected night-time aircraft carrier operations.	The original time of attack was at 6:30 a.m. Hawaiian Time, but the complications of launching the planes and making the 200-mile flight in the dark necessitated a change to the attack taking place at around 8 a.m. Unlike the British Fleet Air Arm, the Japanese Navy was not capable of night-carrier operations.
The raid begins with Japanese pathfinders dropping flares.	No flares were used during the attack by either side since the attack took place at daytime.
The entire military base at Pearl Harbor is destroyed.	Most of Pearl Harbor's infrastructure, such as the power station, fuel depot, shipyards, submarine pens, armories, and the military headquarters, sustained no damage during the attack. (Yamamoto later stated that sparing these facilities was a critical error.)
After the initial attack, the Japanese fleet regroups and annihilates the remainder of the US Pacific Fleet, including its three aircraft carriers, as they return to Pearl Harbor to join the battle.	The Kido Butai Battle Group turned back immediately without any further engagements with American forces. The huge distance the fleet had to travel between Japan and Hawaii and the return trip meant that the fleet's fuel capacity permitted it to operate near Hawaii for only a limited period of time. In addition, many of the ships were needed immediately to support Japanese military offensives in the Western Pacific.
The episode ends with Japanese troops invading Hawaii.	The Japanese military briefly considered trying to seize the Hawaiian Islands but decided that it was impractical since Japan's ground forces, logistics, and resources were already fully committed to the Second Sino-Japanese War but also for military offensives in Southeast Asia and the Western Pacific that were planned to occur almost simultaneously with the Pearl Harbor attack.

== After Pearl Harbor ==
Following its successful invasion, Japan uses Hawaii as its main North Pacific base. The subsequent episodes depict the Japanese military easily defeating Allied forces in Southeast Asia and granting nominal independence to all of the territories that had been under European and American colonial rule under the banner of the Greater East Asia Co-Prosperity Sphere. In subsequent battles in the Tasman Sea and the Torres Strait, the Imperial Navy further cripples American naval power and advances across the Pacific Ocean to strike at the West Coast of the United States. A Japanese submarine-carrier flotilla destroys the Panama Canal's Gatun locks, which significantly hinders American efforts to transfer ships from the Atlantic Fleet to the Pacific theater. The US suffers more crushing setbacks, including a second Panama Canal attack and a long-range surgical airstrike on the Manhattan Project's Los Alamos facilities. They prove too much for US President Henry Roosevelt, who dies of a stroke after learning of the destruction of Los Alamos. His successor, Bill Truman, realizes that the US cannot continue the war and so sues for peace and accepts the surrender terms offered by Japan.

Although the Japanese are initially allied with Nazi Germany, the German dictator, Heinrich von Hitler, becomes concerned about their string of victories and the rapid growth of Japan's technological and military power, which was boosted partly by the expertise of Albert Einstein. Hitler declares war on Japan, whose first thrust against Germany comes in the form of a precision attack by three intercontinental flying-boat bombers on the Germans' atomic weapons research facility.

German forces start the invasion of British India and the United Kingdom. On the Indian Front, the German Wehrmacht conducts an airborne assault on Kolkata and sends troops south to Cochin to meet other German forces coming down the western coast. Japan intervenes by deploying armored forces to support surviving British and Indian units. Another Japanese Navy carrier fleet is also deployed to the Indian Ocean. The Americans lend their support by bombing German convoys. The submarine-carrier flotilla that attacked the Panama Canal, which now exists as a long tunnel to prevent future air attack, is later redeployed to the Bab el-Mandeb to ambush a Kriegsmarine force being sent to the Indian Ocean. Germany, meanwhile, defeats the Soviet Union as Stalin's forces surrender in the Ural Mountains. US forces invade Brittany to ease the pressure off the German invasion of Britain, but the Wehrmacht holds its ground and drives the US forces into the sea, with the last troops forced to leave from their redoubt in Brest. Germany eventually conquers the southern half of England.

The German forces in India, meanwhile, are driven to a stalemate after Japanese bombers destroy the Wehrmacht's headquarters in New Delhi, and intensive antisubmarine warfare ravages the Kriegsmarine's U-boat force in the Indian Ocean. Despite the attack on New Delhi, the conquest of India prompts Hitler to establish the Great European Empire. Nationalist Chinese forces stop the German advance in Xinjiang Province, and Japan sends military forces to bolster the People's Republic of East Siberia, a rump state created in the Russian Far East after the fall of the Soviet Union, as part of a new "Asian Defense Force." At the same time, a change of government in Washington, DC, helps Japan return Hawaii to the US.

While the Germans are stopped in Mongolia, Britain and Japan conduct joint naval operations in the Battle of the Atlantic. British troops and Japanese air and sea forces hold down the German invasion of Britain. At the same time, Japanese commandos infiltrate Hitler's main command center and destroys it with explosives, but Hitler survives. Japan fights off the Kriegsmarine's attacks in the South Atlantic while the allied British-Japanese forces in England muster enough combat power to push the Germans back and to liberate London. The turn of events forces peace talks between Germany, Japan, Britain, and the US. The war ends by late 1950.

== Shin Kyokujitsu no Kantai ==
In the 1997 side story Shin Kyokujitsu no Kantai (新旭日の艦隊: "The New Fleet of the Rising Sun"), Japan builds up on its success in the earlier series by expanding its blue-water capabilities to reach the Atlantic Ocean. The story further details the presence of the Japan's Atlantic fleet revealed in the latter half of Konpeki no Kantai and expound on events that had been given only a passing mention in the series.

After Germany declares war on Japan, the Japanese Navy begins skirmishing the Kriegsmarine in the North Atlantic. In a climactic battle in the second episode, the Japanese Navy's Atlantic force flagship, the super-battleship Yamato Takeru (literally "The Brave of Yamato") engages and destroys Germany's own super-battleship, the Bismarck II. The Japanese Navy later attacks German naval facilities in Kiel, the government quarter in Berlin, and a French-based battery of Heracles railway guns threatening London, and it is earned the Victoria Cross, which is bestowed on fleet commander Admiral Oshii. The move paves the way for transpolar travel between Japan and Britain.

Having defeated the Soviet Union, Germany turns its focus to the West by destroying the White House in a surgical strike. It finally drives the US to rejoin the war, this time as Japan's ally, in the fight against Germany, which had launched a modified Operation Sea Lion against Britain on August 15, 1947. Southern England falls to the Germans, and the British government evacuates to Inverness. However, the Japanese fleet arrives in time to destroy the German beachhead and to stop the invasion forces, many of which are found in Kingston-upon-Hull and Grimsby.

== Characters ==
To keep in line with the World War II theme, Konpeki no Kantai/Kyokujitsu no Kantai also features some characters who closely resemble actual historical figures from the 1940s, whose articles are linked. In all cases, only one part of their name is changed (given name or surname).

=== Japanese Empire ===
- Yasaburō Otaka - Prime Minister (Voiced by: Yuzuru Fujimoto)
- Isoroku Takano - War Minister and Chief of the Combined Fleet (Voiced by: Yūsaku Yara)
- Saigo Nanshu - Deputy Prime Minister (Voiced by: Kōzō Shioya)
- Takayoshi Kido - Foreign Minister (Voiced by: Nobuo Tobita)
- Kazuyuki Maebara (Issei Maebara) - Admiral, I-601 Fugaku skipper and Deep Blue Fleet commander (Voiced by: Hideyuki Tanaka)
- Heihachiro Togo - Admiral (Voiced by: Daisuke Gōri)
- Imperial Duke Kokonoe (Voiced by: Jun'ichi Sugawara)
- Yoshiko Kawashu - Japanese Secret Agent (Voiced by: Ai Orikasa)
- Eisaku Takasugi - Vice-Admiral (Voiced by: Banjō Ginga)
- Otowa Kuki - Vice-Admiral and SNLF commander (Voiced by: Katsuhisa Hōki)
- Yajirō Shinagawa - Commander (Voiced by: Shinya Ōtaki (1st voice) / Masaharu Satō (2nd voice))
- Hideki Nanjō - Prime Minister prior to being replaced by Yasaburō Otaka in a coup d'état (in the novel only?).
- Shingo Genda - Naval aviator who led the aerial attack on Pearl Harbor.

=== United States ===
- Henry Roosevelt - President of the United States (Voiced by: Kan Tokumaru)
- Lewis MacArthur - General of the Army and commander of the US Army Forces Far East (Voiced by: Jun'ichi Sugawara)
- Harriet Eisenhower - General of the Army and commander of US forces in Europe (Voiced by: Tomomichi Nishimura)
- Bill Truman - the Vice President who succeeds Roosevelt after he dies of stroke (Voiced by: Hirohiko Kakegawa)
- Arnold Fletcher - Admiral, US Pacific Fleet (Voiced by: Isshin Chiba)
- (Admiral) Kimmel - Admiral, Commander of the US Pacific Fleet (Voiced by: Ikuya Sawaki)

=== Nazi Germany/Holy European Empire ===
- Heinrich von Hitler - Führer (Voiced by: Ikuya Sawaki)
- Erhardt Goering - Luftwaffe chief (Voiced by: Shinya Ōtaki)
- Alfred Himmler - SS head (Voiced by: Jun'ichi Sugawara)
- Peter Joachim Goebbels - Propaganda Minister
- Wilhelm Jodl - Kriegsmarine admiral
- Konrad von Rommel - Commander of German forces in India
- Walter Manteuffel - Hitler's aide (Voiced by: Hideyuki Hori)

=== Others ===
- Leon Trokki - Leader of the rump People's Republic of East Siberia (Voiced by: Kazunobu Chiba)
- Keiston Churchill - British Prime Minister (Voiced by: Masaharu Satō)
- Suavi Gandhi - Indian independence advocate
- Nerovitch K Stalin - Leader of the Soviet Union (Voiced by: Masaki Aizawa)

== Media ==
=== Home video ===
Cover of 1st Kyokujitsu no KantaiDVD Box

Konpeki no Kantai was released from 1994 to 2003 on LaserDisc and DVD, with each DVD containing two episodes. JC Staff eventually compiled it and Kyokujitsu no Kantai into three large DVD boxed sets. The first was released on July 29, 2005, by Tokuma Shoten and Happinet Pictures, only a few days before the 60th anniversary of the end of World War II. The first set in particular contains an art booklet and the 1997 special episode Secret Launch of the Sorai, a story of two Japanese engineers who develop the Sorai (the series' counterpart of the J7W Shinden fighter) and deploy it against a Tokyo-bound force of US B-30 long-range bombers launched from Alaska. The interception itself is featured in Episode 3. Pre-order rewards include a Zippo lighter replica from 1941 and a scale model of the I-601 submarine carrier. The second DVD box set was released on September 23, 2005. The last compilation was released on November 25, 2005. A Blu-ray release of the entire series was also developed, with the first set released on August 3, 2011, the second on November 25, 2011, and the last on February 24, 2012.

The series is available for purchase over the Internet from a number of sites but is sold only in DVD Region 2 format, which is not compatible with most DVD players available in the United States and Canada, which are Region 1 although some newer DVD players are or can be modified to be region-free. However, all releases, including those available over the Internet, do not include dubs or non-Japanese subtitles. Neither series has been or is planned to be translated for release outside Japan because of their Japan-centric content, such as the Allies being depicted as villains and Japan's conduct during the war being depicted as noble. Since 2020 a crowdfunded fansubbing project has been undertaken.

=== Games ===
In March 1995, NEC Home Electronics released a Konpeki no Kantai turn-based strategy game developed by MicroCabin for the PC-FX. The 3DO version of the game, published by Tokuma Shoten, was released the following month. The Super Famicom version of the game, developed by Access Co. and published by Angel (a subsidiary of Bandai), followed suit in November of the same year.

The game follows all combat operations depicted in the series, with battles fought on an isometric map. The player also has the capability to develop new weapons. However, although the anime series ends with Japan declaring victory with the US and Britain over Germany, Japan's survival in the war is uncertain when Otaka's government is deposed in another coup, Yamamoto dies in jail, and the Deep Blue Fleet's secrets are exposed.

== See also ==
- List of alternate history fiction

== Sources ==
- Aramaki, Yoshio. The Deep Blue Fleet Casebook. Tokuma Shoten, 1992. ISBN 978-4-19-174979-5
- The War Strategy of Deep Blue Fleet. Tokuma Shoten, 1993.
- Yasuda, Takayuki. Kyokujitsu no Kantai FINAL (illustration book) Chuou Kouronsha Inc, 1996. ISBN 978-4-12-500440-2
