= Chōjin Heiki Zeroigar =

1997 video game

- Developer(s): Fupac, Sugeiya, Winds
- Publisher(s): NEC
- Director(s): Masao Masutani
- Producer(s): Katsuhiko Umeki
- Designer(s): Hiromi Matsushita; Masaharu Shimizu
- Programmer(s): Satoshi Fujishima
- Artist(s): Hiromi Matsushita
- Writer(s): Nobuyuki Fujimoto
- Composer(s): Kazuhiro Ogawa
- Platform(s): PC-FX
- Release: JP: August 8, 1997
- Genre(s): Vertically scrolling shooter
- Mode(s): Single-player

Chōjin Heiki Zeroigar (Note: Japanese: 超神兵器ゼロイガー, Hepburn: Chōjin Heiki Zeroigā) is a 1997 vertically scrolling shoot 'em up video game published by NEC for its PC-FX console. It is notable for being the only shooter in the console's library.

== Gameplay ==
Gameplay screenshot

Chōjin Heiki Zeroigar is a vertical-scrolling shoot 'em up game.

== Development and release ==
Chōjin Heiki Zeroigar was created by Satoshi Fujishima. An English-language fan translation was released in 2015 with the title God-Fighter Zeroigar.

== Reception ==
Retro Gamer, an influential retrogaming publication, chose the game as one of the best PC-FX titles for international players, praising its action and detailed sprites. In a special publication, Hardcore Gaming 101 labeled it as a homage to 1970s mecha anime, highlighting the fact that it has FMV cutscenes, which were the focus of Dengeki PC Engine's coverage about the game. The first volume of Retro Gaming History, a Chinese publication, dedicated multiple pages to the game.
