= All Japan Women's Pro Wrestling: Queen of Queens =

1995 video game

- Developer: HuneX Co. Ltd.
- Publisher: NEC Home Entertainment Ltd.
- Platform: PC-FX
- Release: JPN: March 24, 1995
- Genre: Wrestling Fighting

All Japan Women's Pro Wrestling: Queen of Queens (全日本女子プロレス -クィーン オブ クィーンズ-) is a professional wrestling video game released in 1995 on the PC-FX console and developed by NEC Home Electronics. It was released exclusively in Japan as the PC-FX was never sold outside of the country. It utilizes full motion video and is the only wrestling title developed for the console. The game is based on the AJW Joshi pro wrestling promotion.

== Gameplay ==
Queen of Queens uses FMV to achieve its unique gameplay style, all moves are initiated by button combinations, after being input a short movie will play showing the success or failure of the move. Matches can be won via either pinfall or submission. A stamina meter is present in addition to a regenerating health bar. The stamina bar restricts the pace of gameplay and the player must replenish in order to hit further moves.

Disc A features two gameplay modes, "League Mode" a round-robin tournament and single "Vs Mode". Disc B features the same options as Disc A but with an additional "Scenario mode". In scenario mode your chosen wrestler is challenged to prove that she is the best pro wrestler by defeating the wrestlers of the invading KWP promotion.

== Roster ==
The game features two distinct rosters made up of All Japan Women's Pro Wrestling talent on disc A & B, and fictional combatants from "KWP" on disc B only.

- Aja Kong
- Akira Hokuto
- Yumiko Hotta
- Manami Toyota
- Toshiyo Yamada
- Kyoko Inoue
- Takako Inoue
- Etsuko Mita
- Mima Shimoda
- Sakie Hasegawa

Lioness Asuka appears as the non-playable hostess of Queen of Queens' tutorial section.

== See also ==
- List of licensed wrestling video games
