= Mirai Keisatsu Urashiman =

Japanese anime television series

- 未来警察ウラシマン
- Created by: Hirohisa Soda
- Developed by: Hirohisa Soda
- Directed by: Kōichi Mashimo (chief)
- Music by: Shinsuke Kazato
- Country of origin: Japan
- Original language: Japanese
- No. of episodes: 50

Production
- Executive producer: Kenji Yoshida
- Producers: Kazuya Maeda (Fuji TV); Minoru Ono (Yomiko); Akira Inoue (Tatsunoko)
- Production companies: Fuji Television; Tatsunoko Production

Original release
- Network: FNS (Fuji TV)
- Release: January 9 – December 24, 1983

Related
- Manga
- Written by: Hirohisa Soda
- Illustrated by: Noboru Akashi (1–2); Haruka Inui (3–4)
- Published by: Akita Shoten
- Magazine: Weekly Shōnen Champion
- Original run: 1982 – 1983
- Volumes: 4

Mirai Keisatsu Urashiman (未来警察ウラシマン; "Future Policeman Urashiman") is an anime television series created by Hiroshisa Soda and produced by Tatsunoko Production that ran from January 9 to December 24, 1983, on Fuji Television and its affiliates. It was later released in Germany and Sweden as Rock 'n Cop, in Finland as Rocki-kyttä (Rocki-Cop), in France as Super Durand (roughly, "Super Jones" or "Super Smith"), and in Italy as Ryo, un ragazzo contro un impero ("Ryo, a boy against an empire"). A manga adaptation by Soda, illustrated by Noboru Akashi and Haruka Inui and published by Akita Shoten in Weekly Shonen Champion.

Saban Entertainment dubbed it under the title Rock 'n Cop, but this dub was never released in the United States. The Saban version was however used as the base for the Latin American, German, Italian, Swedish and Finnish versions. A film version was in the works but also abandoned. The anime is licensed in North America by Sentai Filmworks.

== Plot ==
The story tells of a young man and his cat who are being pursued by the police during a particularly stormy night in a city in 1983. The man drives his car into the middle of a cyclone and is caught in a spacetime anomaly. As a result, they end up in the year 2050.

Suffering from complete amnesia, he soon finds that he is being pursued by the army-like forces of Necrime, a top criminal organization led by Ludovich. Taking the name Ryū Urashima, the man joins the police force and fights back against Necrime. He is joined in the fight by Sophia, a happy-go-lucky ex-nun, and Claude, a fellow officer. The unit is run by Inspector Gondo Toru. He is also joined by his cat, Myaa, who made the time journey with him and is one of the few links to his past that he remembers.

== Characters ==
Police Division 38 (Magna Police Force)

- Ryū Urashima (ウラシマ・リュウ)/Urashiman: Voiced by: Michitaka Kobayashi
- Claude Mizusawa (クロード（蔵人）・水沢): Voiced by: Akira Kamiya
- Sophia Nina Rose (ソフィア・ニーナ・ローズ): Voiced by: Keiko Yokozawa
- Myaa (ミャー): Voiced by: Masako Katsuki
- Inspector Tōru Gondō (権藤 透): Voiced by: Tōru Ōhira

=== Necrime ===
- Adolf von Ludwig (アドルフ・フォン・ルードヴィッヒ): Voiced by: Kaneto Shiozawa
- Mylène Savelyeva (ミレーヌ・サベリーエワ): Voiced by: Haruko Kitahama
- Jitanda Funda (ジタンダ・フンダ)/Yetander: Voiced by: Mayumi Tanaka
- Stinger Wolf (スティンガー・ウルフ): Voiced by: Tesshō Genda
- Stinger Cat (スティンガー・キャット): Voiced by: Yuri Nashiwa
- Stinger Hawk (スティンガー・ホーク): Voiced by: Shinya Ōtaki
- Stinger Shark (スティンガー・シャーク): Voiced by: Issei Futamata
- Stinger Bear (スティンガー・ベアー): Voiced by: Yū Shimaka
- Führer (総統フューラー): Voiced by: Eiji Maruyama, Kazuyuki Sogabe (young)
- Josephine Catsburg (ジョセフィーヌ・キャッツバーグ): Voiced by: Yoshiko Sakakibara

== Episodes ==
No.	Title	Directed by	Written by	Animation directed by	Original release date
1	"Suddenly, AD 2050!"; Transliteration: "Totsuzen! 2050-Nen" (Japanese: 突然!2050年)	Kōichi Mashimo	Hirohisa Soda	Shigeru Katō	January 9, 1983
2	"The Birth of the Cutie Detective"; Transliteration: "Tanjō! Burikko Keiji (Deka)" (Japanese: 誕生!ブリッコ刑事（デカ）)	Shinya Sadamitsu	Hirohisa Soda	Masami Abe	January 16, 1983
3	"Seeking the Lost Time"; Transliteration: "Ushina Wareta Toki o Motomete" (Japanese: 失われた時を求めて)	Directed by : Koji Sawai; Storyboarded by : Kōichi Mashimo	Hirohisa Soda	Chuichi Iguchi	January 23, 1983
4	"The Pursuing Beetle"; Transliteration: "Oikakete Bītoru" (Japanese: 追いかけてビートル)	Directed by : Takaaki Ishiyama; Storyboarded by : Shinya Sadamitsu	Haruya Yamazaki	Juuji Mizumura	January 30, 1983
5	"The Dangerous Disco Queen"; Transliteration: "Kikenna Disuko Joō (Kuīn)" (Japanese: 危険なディスコ女王（クイーン）)	Yoriyasu Kogawa	Kenji Terada	Shizuo Kawai	February 6, 1983
6	"Giant Sharks Like Pretty Girls"; Transliteration: "Kyodai Zame wa Bijo-Suki" (Japanese: 巨大ザメは美女好き)	Shinya Sadamitsu	Haruya Yamazaki	U-Yeong Jeong	February 13, 1983
7	"Slapped With a Wad of Cash!"; Transliteration: "Satsutaba de Hippatake!" (Japanese: 札束でひっぱたけ!)	Koji Sawai	Hirohisa Soda	Yoshinori Tanabe	February 20, 1983
8	"The Lunar Footprint Is 80 Years Old?"; Transliteration: "Tsuki no Ashiato wa 80-sai?" (Japanese: 月の足跡は80才?)	Takaaki Ishiyama	Sukehiro Tomita	Juuji Mizumura	February 27, 1983
9	"Yesterday's Friends Are Today's Enemies"; Transliteration: "Kinō no Tomo wa Kyō no Teki" (Japanese: 昨日の友は今日の敵)	Masayuki Hayashi	Kenji Terada	Shigeru Katō	March 6, 1983
10	"Higher Than Everest"; Transliteration: "Eberesuto Yori Takaku" (Japanese: エベレストより高く)	Yoriyasu Kogawa	Sukehiro Tomita	Chuichi Iguchi	March 13, 1983
11	"Provocation! The South Sea Island Blizzard!"; Transliteration: "Chōhatsu! Minami no Shima ni Fubuki" (Japanese: 挑発!南の島に吹雪)	Takaaki Ishiyama	Haruya Yamazaki	U-Yeong Jeong	March 20, 1983
12	"The Flying Angel in Red"; Transliteration: "Soratobu Makkana Tenshi" (Japanese: 空飛ぶ真っ赤な天使)	Shinya Sadamitsu	Tokio Tsuchiya	Shizuo Kawai	March 27, 1983
13	"The Thorn Stuck in the Past"; Transliteration: "Kako ni Sasatta Toge" (Japanese: 過去にささったトゲ)	Kōichi Mashimo	Kenji Terada	Takashi Nakamura	April 2, 1983
14	"Myaa Has Superpowers Too?!"; Transliteration: "Myā ni mo Chō Nōryoku!?" (Japanese: ミャーにも超能力!?)	Koji Sawai	Yuki Satō	U-Yeong Jeong	April 9, 1983
15	"Ryu's Captured Heart"; Transliteration: "Tora Reta Ryū no Kokoro" (Japanese: 撮られたリュウの心)	Shinya Sadamitsu	Kenji Terada	Shizuo Kawai	April 16, 1983
16	"Hit Man Good Luck"; Transliteration: "Koroshi-ya Guddo Rakku" (Japanese: 殺し屋グッドラック)	Yoriyasu Kogawa	Kenji Terada	Shigeru Katō	April 23, 1983
17	"Love! Love for a Robot!"; Transliteration: "Ai! Robotto ni Ai!" (Japanese: 愛!ロボットに愛!)	Masayuki Hayashi	Tokio Tsuchiya	Shizuo Kawai	April 30, 1983
18	"Maman Written in Glass"; Transliteration: "Garasu ni Kaita 「Mama」" (Japanese: ガラスに書いた「ママ」)	Takaaki Ishiyama	Toshiki Inoue	Yoshinori Tanabe	May 7, 1983
19	"The Tiffany Mermaid"; Transliteration: "Tifanī de Ningyo" (Japanese: ティファニーで人魚)	Shinya Sadamitsu	Haruya Yamazaki	U-Yeong Jeong	May 14, 1983
20	"An Encounter With Fuhrer"; Transliteration: "Fyūrā to no Sōgū" (Japanese: フューラーとの遭遇)	Kōichi Mashimo	Hirohisa Soda	Chuichi Iguchi	May 21, 1983
21	"Personality Switch!"; Transliteration: "Ire Kawatta Seikaku!" (Japanese: 入れかわった性格!)	Koji Sawai	Hirohisa Soda	Shizuo Kawai	May 28, 1983
22	"Tears! The Determination of Inspector Gondou"; Transliteration: "Namida! Gondō Keibu no Ketsui" (Japanese: 涙!権藤警部の決意)	Takaaki Ishiyama	Kenji Terada	U-Yeong Jeong	June 4, 1983
23	"Hands Off the Booty!"; Transliteration: "Senri-hin ni Te o Dasuna!" (Japanese: 戦利品に手を出すな!)	Yoriyasu Kogawa	Sukehiro Tomita	Shigeru Katō	June 11, 1983
24	"The Make or Break Death Game!"; Transliteration: "Desu Gēmu Ippatsu Shōbu" (Japanese: デスゲーム一発勝負)	Directed by : Hiroyuki Tanaka; Storyboarded by : Masayuki Hayashi	Futoshi Takano	Shizuo Kawai	June 18, 1983
25	"The Legendary Big Saturday"; Transliteration: "Densetsu no Biggu Satadē" (Japanese: 伝説のビッグサタデー)	Shinya Sadamitsu	Kenji Terada	U-Yeong Jeong	June 25, 1983
26	"The Neo Tokio to Hell Express"; Transliteration: "Neo Tokio-Hatsu Jigoku Iki" (Japanese: ネオトキオ発地獄行き)	Directed by : Yoriyasu Kogawa; Storyboarded by : Takashi Nakamura	Haruya Yamazaki	Takashi Nakamura	July 2, 1983
27	"Ryoga, Don't Die in the Universe…"; Transliteration: "Beā Uchū ni Shisu…" (Japanese: ベアー宇宙に死す…)	Takaaki Ishiyama	Sukehiro Tomita & Hirohisa Soda	Chuichi Iguchi	July 9, 1983
28	"It's Painful to Make a Mistake"; Transliteration: "Puroresu wa Tsurai ze" (Japanese: プロレスはつらいぜ)	Koji Sawai	Kenji Terada	U-Yeong Jeong	July 16, 1983
29	"Urashiman is on the Wanted List"; Transliteration: "Shimei Tehai! Ryū no Kubi" (Japanese: 指名手配!リュウの首)	Directed by : Hiroyuki Tanaka; Storyboarded by : Futoshi Takano	Toshiki Inoue	Shizuo Kawai	July 30, 1983
30	"Corrupted Officers in the Wilderness"; Transliteration: "Kōya no Akuroku Sherifu" (Japanese: 荒野の悪徳保安官)	Directed by : Takaaki Ishiyama; Storyboarded by : Kunihiko Yuyama	Futoshi Takano	Yoshinori Tanabe	August 6, 1983
31	"Urashiman is Full of Love"; Transliteration: "Ryū Yori Ai o Komete" (Japanese: リュウより愛を込めて)	Yoriyasu Kogawa	Kenji Terada	U-Yeong Jeong	August 13, 1983
32	"Trick 1983"; Transliteration: "Torikku 1983" (Japanese: トリック 1983)	Directed by : Koji Sawai; Storyboarded by : Kōichi Mashimo	Hirohisa Soda	Shigeru Katō	August 20, 1983
33	"The Truth About Phillip"; Transliteration: "Fyūrā no Shinjitsu" (Japanese: フューラーの真実)	Directed by : Takaaki Ishiyama; Storyboarded by : Kōichi Mashimo	Hirohisa Soda	Takashi Nakamura	August 27, 1983
34	"Breaking the Rules"; Transliteration: "Hangyaku no Merodī" (Japanese: 反逆のメロディー)	Directed by : Kōichi Mashimo; Storyboarded by : Hiroshi Suzuki	Hirohisa Soda	Chuichi Iguchi	September 3, 1983
35	"Lord Peter's Inheritance"; Transliteration: "Fyūrā no Isan" (Japanese: フューラーの遺産)	Koji Sawai	Kenji Terada	U-Yeong Jeong	September 10, 1983
36	"Lord Peter's Trap"; Transliteration: "Rūdobihhi no Wana" (Japanese: ルードビッヒの罠)	Masayuki Hayashi	Toshiki Inoue	Shizuo Kawai	September 17, 1983
37	"Change! Dirty Urashiman"; Transliteration: "Henshin! Dāti Ryū" (Japanese: 変身!ダーティリュウ)	Yoriyasu Kogawa	Haruya Yamazaki	Shigeru Katō	September 24, 1983
38	"Running Towards the National Treasury"; Transliteration: "Kinko ni Mukatte Hashire!" (Japanese: 金庫に向って走れ!)	Directed by : Koji Sawai; Storyboarded by : Kōichi Mashimo	Kenji Terada	U-Yeong Jeong	October 1, 1983
39	"New Tokyo's Holiday"; Transliteration: "Neo Tokio no Kyūjitsu" (Japanese: ネオトキオの休日)	Shinya Sadamitsu	Toshiki Inoue	Shigeru Katō	October 8, 1983
40	"Phillip's Retaliation"; Transliteration: "Fyūrā no Gyakushū" (Japanese: フューラーの逆襲)	Masayuki Hayashi	Toshiki Inoue	Shizuo Kawai	October 15, 1983
41	"Master Yamason"; Transliteration: "Amazon no Nana-ri" (Japanese: アマゾンの七人)	Takaaki Ishiyama	Kenji Terada	U-Yeong Jeong	October 22, 1983
42	"Goodbye Keita"; Transliteration: "Saraba! Kurōdo" (Japanese: さらば!クロード)	Shinya Sadamitsu	Haruya Yamazaki	Toshio Kawaguchi & Nobuyoshi Hoshikawa	October 29, 1983
43	"Lord Peter's Glory"; Transliteration: "Eikō no Rūdobihhi" (Japanese: 栄光のルードビッヒ)	Koji Sawai	Hirohisa Soda & Kenji Terada	Chuichi Iguchi	November 5, 1983
44	"The Race with illusionary Powers"; Transliteration: "Maboroshi no Chō Nōryoku Ichizoku" (Japanese: 幻の超能力一族)	Yoriyasu Kogawa	Kenji Terada	U-Yeong Jeong	November 12, 1983
45	"The Assassin That Needs To Be Killed"; Transliteration: "Hissatsu! Kyōfu no Shikaku" (Japanese: 必殺!恐怖の刺客)	Shinya Sadamitsu	Haruya Yamazaki	Shizuo Kawai	November 19, 1983
46	"Nicrime's Final Attack!"; Transliteration: "Nekuraimu no Sō Kōgeki" (Japanese: ネクライムの総攻撃)	Takaaki Ishiyama	Kenji Terada	Shigeru Katō	November 26, 1983
47	"The Return of Phillip"; Transliteration: "Kattekita Fyūrā" (Japanese: 帰って来たフューラー)	Shinya Sadamitsu	Haruya Yamazaki	U-Yeong Jeong	December 3, 1983
48	"Lord Peter's Death"; Transliteration: "Rūdobihhi no Saigo" (Japanese: ルードビッヒの最期)	Directed by : Koji Sawai; Storyboarded by : Kōichi Mashimo	Hirohisa Soda	Shizuo Kawai	December 10, 1983
49	"The Super Powers of Love and Hate"; Transliteration: "Ai to Shi no Chō Nōryoku" (Japanese: 愛と死の超能力)	Yoriyasu Kogawa	Hirohisa Soda	Chuichi Iguchi	December 17, 1983
50	"Good Bye, 2050"; Transliteration: "Sayonara 2050-Nen" (Japanese: サヨナラ2050年)	Directed by : Takaaki Ishiyama; Storyboarded by : Kōichi Mashimo	Kenji Terada & Futoshi Takano	Shigeru Katō	December 24, 1983
