= Yoshio Aramaki =

Japanese novelist (born 1933)

Yoshio Aramaki (荒巻義雄, Aramaki Yoshio, born 12 April 1933) is a Japanese science fiction and mystery writer, critic and art collector. His original given name was Kunio Aramaki (荒巻邦夫, Aramaki Kunio). He has changed his name to Yoshimasa Aramaki (荒巻義雅). Aramaki is well known by his so-called "Meta-SF" works which are characterized by their speculative and fantastic themes and depictions. He is also famous for his various series of "imaginary battle" novels and alternate history novels such as Konpeki no Kantai series. He is a member of the Japan Writers’ Association, and of the SFWJ (Science Fiction and Fantasy Writers of Japan), and of the Contemporary Haiku Association. He was also a professor in the Seishū Women's University (now, Sapporo International University) from 1993 to 1997.

== Biography ==
=== Overview ===
Aramaki was born on 12 April 1933 in Otaru in Hokkaidō prefecture. He graduated from Hokkaidō Minami Sapporo high school. He graduated from Waseda University. He became an employee at a publishing company and worked in Tokyo. But he returned to Sapporo to take over his family business. Aramaki entered school again and graduated from the department of technology, civil engineering course, in the Hokkai Gakuen University Junior College Division (北海学園大学短期大学部), and obtained an architect degree. He took office as a representative director in Hokken Shōji Co. Ltd (北建商事株式会社).

He joined the Hokkaidō science fiction club and contributed various stories and critiques to the magazine "CORE" from 1965 to 1967. In 1970, Aramaki presented a critique "Theory of Novels by Kunst" (術の小説論, Jutsu no Shōsetsu-ron) in S-F Magazine in response to Kōichi Yamano Here, Aramaki analyzed the Robert Heinlein's works by using the concept of "fiction by Kunst", thereby he advocated the new possibilities of Japanese SF works in this critique. He also published his allegorical short story "Ōinaru Shōgo (The Great Noon)" (大いなる正午) in the same publication. He thus he debuted as a writer and a critic in the same publication.

Aramaki wrote novels New Wave science fiction and Surrealism. At the same time, he also wrote Space opera stories such as the "Big Wars" series and so on. His short story "Yawarakai Tokei" (柔らかい時計, "Soft Clocks"), took its central motif from the picture by Salvador Dalí. It translated into English and appeared in the British SF magazine Interzone in 1989 to some acclaim.

His early speculative novelette "Shirakabe no Moji wa Yūhi ni Haeru" (白壁の文字は夕陽に映える, The Writings on the White Wall are Shined On By the Setting Sun) received the Seiun Award in 1972. His first full-length and the first volume of the"Shiraki series, Shiroki Hi Tabidateba Fushi (白き日旅立てば不死, Departing on the White Day, That Is, Immortality), was a runner-up for the Izumi Kyōka Prize for Literature.

Aramaki wrote many "Denki-Roman stories" (伝奇ロマン小説, Legendary Roman story) in the 1980s and 1990s. He also wrote many "imaginary battle / alternate history" stories from the middle 1980s to ca. 2000. They are "Yōsai series" (要塞シリーズ, Fortress series) and "Fleet series" which contains "Konpeki no Kantai series (Deep Blue Fleet)" and "Kyokujitsu no Kantai series (Fleet of the Rising Sun)". He published the critique "Discovery of Simulation Novels" (シミュレーション小説の発見, Shimyureeshon shōsestu no hakken) in 1994.

After 2000, he published the books of the Corridor of Super Strings - Atlantis Big Wars series and other work.

In November 2014, he commenced publication of the Teihon Aramaki Yoshio Meta-SF Zenshū (定本荒巻義雄メタＳＦ全集 (Aramaki Yoshio Complete and Standard Collection of Meta-SF Works). The publication of this collection was completed in July 2015. The Collection is made up of seven main volumes and one extra. In July 2017, Aramaki published the last volume of his meta-SF series, Shiraki series Mohaya Uchū wa Meikyū no Kagami no yōni (もはや宇宙は迷宮の鏡のように, "Now the Cosmos is Like the Mirrors of Labyrinth".

Aramaki was the owner of the Sapporo Tokeidai gallery (札幌時計台ギャラリー). He is known as a collector of the paintings of the artists in Hokkaidō. Many paintings in the collection were donated to the Sapporo Arts Forest Museum (札幌芸術の森美術館).

=== Early career ===
Aramaki has stated the origin of his surreal and "speculative" emotions had their root in his birthplace, Otaru. The circumstances in the young days might form his basis of imaginations. The land of Hokkaidō and his early experiences are recurrent themes in his later works.

Aramaki went to the metropolis Tokyo and studied psychology in Waseda University from 1954 to 1957. He worked several years in a publishing company in Tokyo. Aramaki had the ambition to be a professional writer in those days. But he did not stay in Tokyo. When he faced the violent and chaotic movement against the renewal of the Treaty of Mutual Cooperation and Security Between the United States and Japan in 1960, he was disappointed at the ideals of the Socialist revolution and abandoned his ambition. Aramaki left Tokyo and returned to Hokkaidō to take over his family business.

After returned to Sapporo, Aramaki joined a SF club and operated its coterie magazine CORE from 1965 to 1967. In this magazine, he contributed many critiques and stories. One, "Shimi" appeared in the first issue of CORE magazine, and which formed an early vision of his debut story "Ōinaru Shōgo". Then he wrote and published the critical essays on Arthur C. Clarke's Childhood's End, Philip K. Dick's The Man in the High Castle and Yasutaka Tsutsui's Tōkaidō War

Aramaki joined Takumi Shibano's fan magazine Uchūjin. He contributed various critiques and stories to it. Aramaki contributed the series of critical essays on American science fiction, in which Aramaki tried to understand America and its culture, which had defeated Japan in the Pacific War. These essays would lead to the later Fleet series such as Konpeki no Kantai. Aramaki also published his short story "The Breakwater to Time (Toki no Bōhatei)" ", which is a prototype of "The Great Noon (Ōinaru Shōgo)". He published the counterargument against Yamano's criticism. It was the beginning of the so-called "Yamano-Aramaki debate"

=== Debate between Aramaki and Yamano ===
In the late 1960s, New Wave science fiction works such as those by Ballard and Dick and of the philosophically inclined unrelated work of Stanislaw Lem had begun to get noticed by Japanese science fiction readers and writers. Kōichi Yamano' published his critical article "Nihon SF no Genten to Shikō" (日本ＳＦの原点と指向, Japanese SF: Its Originality and Orientation) in S-F Magazine in 1969. Yamano described existing Japanese as imitations of American SF. With no original Japanese SF works having been written, he suggested a new movement towards it.

Aramaki, in opposition to this Yamano's criticism, contributed his opinions to the fan magazine Uchūjin. Aramaki was also searching for new possibilities of Japanese SF. In 1969, Aramaki and Yamano debated. Yamano advocated the New SF in Japan. He began publishing his 'Quarterly NW-SF Magazine (季刊NW-SF, Kikan NW-SF) in 1970. On the other hand, Aramaki published his critical article "Jutsu no Shōsetsu-ron" (術の小説論) in S-F Magazine in 1970. Aramaki took his own course of speculative and surreal fiction. Aramaki started publishing his unique metafictional works.

=== Early metafictional stories in S-F Magazine ===
After the debut as a writer in 1970, Aramaki went forth with his published his "metafiction" novelettes in S-F Magazine from 1970 to around 1973. For details see bibliography below.

Aramaki's first novel "Shiroki Hi tabidateba Fushi" (the first book of the Shiraki series) was published in April 1972. His early masterpiece Shinsei-dai ("The Sacred Era") was published in May 1978, a short story version of it having appeared in S-F Magazine in 1970.

=== Space operas and work in other genres ===
Aramaki tried to explore story themes in a variety of genres and styles. In 1975, he published Kūhaku no Jūjika ("Vacant Cross") an occult novel set in contemporary Japan. This is the first book of the Kūhaku series. "Tennyo no Misshitsu" in 1977 is a locked room mystery. Ōgon Mayu no Nemuri (1976) is also set in current day Japan, like Kūhaku series, the stage is contemporary Japan. This is the first book of the Kimmeria Nanatsu no Hihō ("The Seven Secret Treasures of Kimmeria") series.

Aramaki wrote the space opera stories. Kami naru Eien no Kaiki in 1978. It was the first book of the Big Wars series. The stories in this series are more hard science fiction.

In 1980, he published Megami-tachi no Gogo ("Afternoon of Goddesses"), a collection of novelettes. Each story features a young woman protagonist.

Meanwhile, Aramaki had graduated from the department of engineering, and was an engineer and an architect.

=== "Imaginary Battle" and alternative history works ===
Aramaki published "Niseko Yōsai 1986 part 1 - Rishiri-Rebun Tokkō-hen (ニセコ要塞1986 [1] - 利尻・礼文特攻篇 Niseko Fortress 1986). This is the first book of twenty volume Yōsai (Fortress) series (要塞シリーズ. The last book of this series 'Fugaku Yōsai 3, the Apocalypse Program (富嶽要塞３ 黙示録プログラム) was published in December 2001.

While writing the series, Aramaki started to publish the new alternative history series, "Kantai Series" (艦隊シリーズ Fleet Series). The first volume was "Konpeki no Kantai 1". In 1992, Aramaki started publishing the Kyokujitsu no Kantai Series in addition. Sixty-there volumes were published from 1990 to 2000. These convey an alternative version of World War II.

The Kantai Series as adapted into several console games, manga, and anime. The anime series were especially well-known. More than five million copies were sold.

=== Nippon 2007 and criticism activities ===
In August 2007, Nippon 2007, the first World SF Convention in Asia, took place at Yokohama. A panel on steampunk and Alternate history took place with Fumio Takano, Masaaki Shindo, Haruaki Utsukibara, Tadashi Nagase, and Aramaki were panelist. Aramaki also became a panelist in the "New wave/ Speculative fiction" panel.

Spurred by this, Aramaki joined the critique site "Speculative Japan" which was founded by translator Mamoru Masuda JA). He contributed many critiques to this site. In 2008, Aramaki rejoined the SFWJ and began to take a role in Japanese SF criticism. The SFWJ had established the Nihon SF Critique Award in 2006. Aramaki served as a chief of the selection committee from 4th to 7th award. The new critics such as Yoshiyuki Ishiwa, Akira Okawada, Maki Takatsuki etc., have debuted through this award.

In 2014, the literary exhibition "Aramaki Yoshio no Sekai" (荒巻義雄の世界, The World of Aramaki Yoshio) was held in Hokkaido Museum of Literature at Sapporo from February 8 to March 23. The project of this event started from the one design drawing which Aramaki had asked architect Tsuneyo Matsuhashi to draw for showing the structure of the City-type Starship, appeared in the Big Wars series, in 1983. And during these 30 years, Shōichi Nakano had created many CG images of this starship scenes. Thereby the exhibition of the CG arts and its original writer Aramaki was planned and held. Among various events, the Panel "The Origin of the World of Aramaki Yoshio" took place. Aramaki, Takayuki Tatsumi, Mari Kotani, Denis Taillandier and two others were panelist. Aramaki talked his origins of a writer.

== Awards ==
- 1972 Seiun Award (Best Japanese Short Story), for Shirakabe no Moji wa Yūhi ni Haeru (白壁の文字は夕陽に映える)
- 2012 Hokkaidō Shinbun Literature Award (in division of poetry), for Poetry Gaikotsu Hantō (骸骨半島, Skelton Peninsula)
- 2012 Medal of Dark blue ribbon (紺綬褒章, Konju Hōshō)
- 2013 Sapporo Arts Award (札幌芸術賞)
- 2023 43rd Nihon SF Taisho Award for Collected Essays on Science Fiction (SFする思考 荒巻義雄評論集成)

== Works ==
=== Novels and collections ===
Note: If books belong to the certain series, the first book of the series is shown here. There are exceptions.

- Shirakabe no Moji wa Yūhi ni Haeru (collection) (白壁の文字は夕陽に映える, The Writings on the White Wall are Shined by the Setting Sun) 1972-04 Hayakawa Publishing (ja:早川書房)
- Shiroki Hi Tabidateba Fushi (白き日旅立てば不死, Departing on the White Day, that is, Immortality) 1972-12 Hayakawa Publishing
- Kūhaku no Jūjika (空白の十字架, The Vacant Stauros [Cross]) 1975-05 Shodensha (祥伝社)
- Toki no Ashibune (collection) (時の葦舟, The Reed Ship of Time) 1975-07 Bunka Shuppankyoku (文化出版局)
- Ōgon Mayu no Nemuri (黄金繭の睡り, The Sleep of the Golden Cocoon) 1976-09 Tokuma Shoten (徳間書店)
- Tennyo no Misshitsu (天女の密室, Closed Room of Heavenly Maiden) 1977-11 Jitsugyo no Nihon Sha (実業之日本社)
- Aru Hareta Hi no Wien wa Mori no naka ni Tatazumu (collection) (ある晴れた日のウイーンは森の中にたたずむ, On a Certain, Fine Day, Stands Wien in the Forest) 1980-08 Kodansha (講談社)
- Shinsei-dai (神聖代) 1978-05 Tokuma Shoten (徳間書店)
  - English version: The Sacred Era 2017-06 University of Minnesota Press amazon.com
- Kami naru Eien no Kaiki (神鳴る永遠の回帰, The Thundering Divine of the Eternal Return) 1978-09 Tokuma Shoten
- Yawarakai Tokei (collection) (柔らかい時計, Soft Clocks)1978-11 Tokuma Shoten
- Uchū Nijūgo-ji (collection) (宇宙25時, The Space 25 O'clock) 1978-12 Tokuma Shoten
- Shinshū Byakuma-den - Klein no Tasubo no Maki (神州白魔伝 九来印之壺の巻, White Devil Legend in the Divine Province - Volume of Klein Bottle) 1979-01 Kisotengai Sha (ja:奇想天外社)
- Solomon no Hihō (ソロモンの秘宝, Solomon's Secret Treasure) 1980-07 Tokuma Shoten
- Megami-tachi no Gogo - Aoi Tabi no Sakuhin-shū (collection) (女神たちの午後―青い旅の作品集, The Afternoon of goddesses - Stories from the Blue Travel) 1980-12 Kadokawa Shoten
- Abandandero no Kai-kikai (collection) (アバンダンデロの快機械, Pleasure Machine of Abandondero) 1981-03 Kadokawa shoten
- Walpurgis no Yoru (collection) (ヴァルプルギスの夜, The Night of Walpurgis) 1981-07 Kadokawa Shoten /bunko/
- Satsui no Myōō (殺意の明王, Murderous Intent of Vidya-raja [Wisdom King]) 1981-11 Yuraku Shuppan (有楽出版)
- Castrovalva (collection) (カストロバルバ) 1983-12 Chuokoron Sha ja:中央公論社
- Faust Jidai (ファウスト時代, The Faust Age) 1982-11 Kodansha
- Mū Tairiku no Shihou(ムー大陸の至宝, The Supreme Treasure in the Mu Continent) 1984-02 Kadokawa Shoten
- Yoshitsune Maihō Densetsu Satsujin Jiken (義経埋宝伝説殺人事件, Murder affair of the Yoshitsune's Buried Treasure Legend) 1985-10 Kodansha
- Kodai Kagome-zoku no Inbō (古代かごめ族の陰謀, Conspiracy by the Ancient Kagome Family) 1985-10 Tokuma Shoten
- Niseko Yōsai 1986 part 1 - Rishiri-Rebun Tokkō-hen (ニセコ要塞1986 [1] - 利尻・礼文特攻篇 Niseko Fortress 1986, part 1, Rishiri-Rebun Special Attack) 1986-07 Chuokoron Sha
- Maboroshi Bunmei no Tabi - Kūsō Kojiki (collection) (幻文明の旅 - 空想古事記, Travels to the Visionary Civilizations - Kojiki in Fantasy) 1986-09 Tokuma Shoten ISBN 4-19-578138-8 C0193
- Sei-Stefan Jiin no Kane no Ne wa (聖シュテファン寺院の鐘の音は, The Sounding Bells of the Saint Stefan Cathedral) 1988-05 Tokuma Shoten
- Nekosenshi Chō D-kyū Keikaku (猫戦士超Ｄ球計画, Cat warrior, the Super Dyson Sphere Project) 1989-06 Tairiku Shobo (ja:大陸書房)
- Sarutobi Sasuke : Kishu Densetsu no Kan - Tanjō-hen (猿飛佐助 貴種伝説の巻 誕生編) 1998-10 Kadokawa Shoten
- Konpeki no Kantai 1, Unmei no Kaisen (紺碧の艦隊 1 運命の開戦, Deep Blue Fleet 1, Fate of Starting a War) 1990-12 Tokuma Shoten
- Kyokujitsu no Kantai 1, Chōsenkan Yamato Takeru no Mikoto Shutsugeki (旭日の艦隊 1 超戦艦日本武尊出撃, Fleet of the Rising Sun, Sally of Super Battleship Prince Yamato Takeru) 1992-06 Chuokoron Sha
- Shin Konpeki no Kantai zero (0), Itsuwari no Heiwa (新紺碧の艦隊零 偽りの平和, New Deep Blue Fleet 1, Deceptive Peace) 1997-04 Tokuma Shoten
- Shin Kyokujitsu no Kantai zero (0), Yumemiru Chōsenkan (新旭日の艦隊零 夢みる超戦艦, New Fleet of the Rising Sun, Dreaming Super Battleship) 1997-06 Chuokoron Sha
- Teikoku no Hikari 1, Venture 2025 (帝国の光１ ベンチャー2025年, Light of the Empire 1, Venture 2025) 1997-08 Gentoha
- Kyokujitsu no Kaisen, Nichiro-sensō no Chiseigaku (旭日の海戦 日露戦争の地政学) 1998-12 Kadokawa Shoten 1998.12
- Kyokujitsu no Senkan, Sōseki to Mikasa (旭日の戦艦 漱石と三笠, Battleship of Rising Sun, Sōseki and Mikasa) 1999-07 Kadokawa Shoten
- PLUG (PLUG) 2002-01 Kadokawa Shoten
- Chōgen Kairō - Atlantis Taisen 1 (超弦回廊 アトランティス大戦 1, The Corridor of Super Strings - Atlantis Big War 1) 2003-04 Chuokoron Sha
- Romanov Teikoku no Yabou - Nihon Seifuku Sensō (ロマノフ帝国の野望 日本征服戦争, The Ambition of the Romanov Empire - The War for Conquring Japan) 2010-05 Chuokoron Sha
- Teihon Aramaki Yoshio Meta-SF Zenshū, Dai-3 kan "Shiroki Hi Tabidateba Fushi" (collection) (定本荒巻義雄メタSF全集 第3巻『白き日旅立てば不死』, Aramaki Yoshio Complete and Standard Collection of Meta-SF Works, volume 3) 2014-11 Sairyūsha ja:彩流社
- Mohaya Uchū wa Meikyū no Kagami no yōni (もはや宇宙は迷宮の鏡のように, Now the Cosmos is Like the Mirrors of Labyrinth) 2017-07 Sairyu Sha (ja:彩流社)

=== Metafiction novels ===
- Shiraki Series (白樹シリーズ) 1972–2017, 3 volumes
  - Shiroki Hi Tabidateba Fushi (白き日旅立てば不死, Departing on the White Day, that is, Immortality) 1972-12 Hayakawa Publishing
  - Sei-Stefan Jiin no Kane no Ne wa (聖シュテファン寺院の鐘の音は, The Sounding Bells of the Saint Stefan Cathedral) 1988-05 Tokuma Shoten
  - Mohaya Uchū wa Meikyū no Kagami no yōni (もはや宇宙は迷宮の鏡のように, Now the Cosmos is Like the Mirrors of Labyrinth) 2017-07 Sairyu Sha (ja:彩流社) ISBN 978-4-7791-2110-4

==== Early metafiction novelettes ====
Aramaki published around 15 metafictional novelettes in S-F Magazine in the early 1970s. These take place around fifty years in the future (from the time written). They had fallen into comparative obscurity. In 2013, French culture studies researcher Denis Taillandier published the paper discussing and evaluating Aramaki's early short story "Soft Clocks". The revaluation of Aramaki's metafictional works were started. In the course of the renewed interest, publication of the "Complete Collection of Meta-SF Works was planned.

The following list shows the early metafictional novelettes and short stories appeared in S-F from 1970 to ca. 1973:

Issue	Title	Size	Romanized title	English
1970-05	術の小説論	-	Jutsu no Shōsetsu-ron (cririque)	Theory of Fictions by Kunst
1970-08	大いなる正午	75	Ōinaru Shōgo	The Great Noon
1970-11	種子よ	-	Shusi yo	Oh, The Seed
1971-02	白壁の文字は夕陽に映える	100	Shirakabe no Moji wa Yūhi ni Haeru	The Letters on the White Wall are Shined On by the Setting Sun
1971-04	ある晴れた日のウィーンは 森の中にたたずむ	140	Aru Hareta Hi no Wien wa Mori no naka ni Tatazumu	Wien on a Certain, Fine Day Stands in the Forest
1971-06	緑の太陽	100	Midori no Taiyō	The Green Sun
1971-08	ああ荒野	100	Aa, Kōya	Ah, Wilderness
1971-11	大いなる失墜	140	Ōinaru Shittsui	The Great Downfall
1971-12	無限への崩壊	140	Migen e no Hōkai	Collapse into Infinity
1972-02	柔らかい時計	-	Yawarakai Tokei	Soft Clocks
1972-04	石機械	150	Ishi Kikai	Stone Machine
1972-06	性炎樹の花咲くとき	100	Seienju no Hanasaku Toki	When the Sexual-flame-trees Bloom
1972-10	宇宙25時	115	Uchū 25-ji	The Space 25 O'Clock
1972-13	白い環	100	Shiroi Wa	The White Ring
1973-02	噫々レムリア	-	Aa, Lemuria	Ah, Lemuria
1973-04	時の葦船	100	Toki no Ashibune	The Reed Ship of Time

=== Roman-fleuve SF Novels ===
- Big Wars series (ビッグウォーズ・シリーズ) 1978-1998

=== Denki Roman Novel series ===
- Kūhaku series (空白シリーズ, Vacancy series) 1975-1987
- Kimmeria Nanatsu no Hihō series (キンメリヤ七つの秘宝シリーズ, Seven Secret Treasures of Kimmeria series) 1976-1981
- Shimanari series (嶋成シリーズ, Shimanari series) 1977, 1979
- Byakuma-den series (白魔伝シリーズ, White Devil Legend series) 1979 (uncompleted)
- Hihō series (秘宝シリーズ, Secret Treasures series) 1980-1985
- Maihō Densetsu series (埋宝伝説シリーズ, Buried Treasure Legend series) 1985-1900
- Myōō series (明王シリーズ, Wisdom King series) 1981-1991
- Mū series (ムー・シリーズ, Mū series) 1984-1987
- Sasuke series (佐助シリーズ, Sasuke series) 1989-1992

=== Imaginary Battle / Alternate History series ===
- Yōsai Series (要塞シリーズ Fortress Series) 1986–2001, 20 volumes
  - Niseko Yōsai 1986 1-3 (ニセコ要塞 1986, Niseko Fortress 1986) 1986-1988
  - Towada Yōsai 1991 1-3 (十和田要塞 1991, Towada Fortress 1991) 1989
  - Aso Yōsai 1995 1-5 (阿蘇要塞 1995, Aso Fortress 1995) 1990-1991
  - Biwako Yōsai 1997 1-6 (琵琶湖要塞 1997, Biwako Fortress 1997)
  - Fugaku Yōsai 1-3 (富嶽要塞, Fugaku Fortress) 2001
- Kantai Series (艦隊シリーズ, Fleet Series) 1990–2000, 63 volumes
  - Konpeki no Kantai Series 1-20 (紺碧の艦隊シリーズ, Deep Blue Fleet series) 1990-1996 Tokuma Shoten
  - Kyokujitsu no Kantai Series 1-16 (旭日の艦隊シリーズ, Fleet of Rising Sun series) 1992-1996 Chuokoron Sha
  - Shin Konpeki no Kantai Series 0, 1-8 (新・紺碧の艦隊シリーズ, New Deep Blue Fleet series) 1997-2000 Tokuma Shoten (0), Gentosha (1-8)
  - Shin Kyokujitsu no Kantai Series 0, 1-17 (新・旭日の艦隊シリーズ, New Fleet of Rising Sun series) 1997-2000 Chuo Kouron Sha, Shin Chuokoron Sha

=== Simulation Novel series ===
- Teikoku no Hikari Series 1-2 (帝国の光シリーズ, Light of the Empire series) 1997 Gentosha
- Chōgen Kairō Series 1-6 (超弦回廊シリーズ, The Corridor of Super Strings series) 2003-2008 Shin Chuokoron Sha

=== Young Adult fiction ===
- Gomannen-go no Natsuyasumi (五万年後の夏休み) 1978-11 Tsuru Shobō (鶴書房) - (Jikan Kanshi-in series 1)
- Midori no Uchū Guntō (緑の宇宙群島) 1980-02 Kadokawa Shoten - (Jikan Kanshi-in series 2) /bunko/
- Seiun-Ki I Higeki no Ōji (星運紀 I 悲劇の王子) 1991-04 Keibun Sha (勁文社)
- Seiun-Ki II Ōji no Shutsugeki (星運紀 II 王子の出撃) 1991-09 Keibun Sha (勁文社)

=== Critique ===
- Simulation Shōsetsu no Hakken (シミュレーション小説の発見) 1994-12 Chuokoron Sha (中央公論社)

=== Essays ===
- Maboroshi Bunmei no Tabi - Kūsō Kojiki (幻文明の旅 - 空想古事記, Travels to the Visionary Civilizations - Kojiki in Fantasy) 1986-09 Tokuma Shoten ISBN 4-19-578138-8 C0193
- Ryūkō Sakka no Dennō Shinan - Korenara dekiru Ichitarō 7 (流行作家の電脳指南 これならできる一太郎7, Guide of Computer by a Popular Writer - How to use Ichitarō 7) 1997-01 Chuokoron Sha
- Kyokujitsu no Kaisen, Nichiro-sensō no Chiseigaku (旭日の海戦 日露戦争の地政学) 1998-12 Kadokawa Shoten 1998.12
- Kyokujitsu no Senkan, Sōseki to Mikasa (旭日の戦艦 漱石と三笠, Battleship in the Rising Sun, Sōseki and Mikasa) 1999-07 Kadokawa Shoten
- Rōma-jin ga Egaita Sekaichizu (ローマ人が描いた世界地図, The World map drawn by the Romans) 2002-12 Seishun Shuppan (青春出版社) Playbooks
- Jinsei wa SF da (人生はＳＦだ 2013-01 Life is just SF) Iwasaki Insatsu Co. Ltd. /Private publication/

=== Poetry ===
- Shishū “Gaikotsu Hantō"’’ - Aramaki Yoshio Daiichi Shishū (骸骨半島－荒巻義雄第一詩集, ‘’Skelton Peninsula’’) Private publication 2011-08 /Yoshio Sōsho 3/

== Complete Collection of Meta-SF Works ==
Aramaki Yoshio Complete and Standard Collection of Meta-SF Works (定本荒巻義雄メタSF全集, Teihon Aramaki Yoshio Meta-SF Zenshū) edited and compiled by Takayuki Tatsumi + Yūji Miura (巽孝之＋三浦祐嗣):

- Volume 1 : Yawarakai Tokei (柔らかい時計, Soft Clocks) 2015-05 Sairyū Sha (彩流社) ISBN 978-4-7791-2107-4
- Volume 2 : Uchū 25 ji (Uchū Nijū-go Ji) (宇宙25時, The Space 25 O'clock) 2015-02 Sairyū Sha ISBN 978-4-7791-2104-3
- Volume 3 : Shiroki Hi Tabidateba Fushi (白き日旅立てば不死, Departing on the White Day, that is, Immortality) 2014-11 Sairyū Sha ISBN 978-4-7791-2101-2
- Volume 4 : Sei-Stefan Jiin no Kane no Ne wa (聖シュテファン寺院の鐘の音は, The Sounding Bells of the Saint Stefan Cathedral) 2014-12 Sairyū Sha ISBN 978-4-7791-2102-9
- Volume 5 : Toki no Ashibune (時の葦舟, The Reed Ship of Time) 2015-01 Sairyū Sha ISBN 978-4-7791-2103-6
- Volume 6 : Shinsei-dai (神聖代, The Sacred Era) 2015-03 Sairyū Sha ISBN 978-4-7791-2105-0
- Volume 7 : Castrovalva/Gothic (カストロバルバ／ゴシック, Castrovalva/ Gothic) 2015-04 Sairyū Sha ISBN 978-4-7791-2106-7
- Extra Volume : Gaikotsu Hantō, Hanayome, etc. (骸骨半島 花嫁他, Skelton Peninsula, Bride, etc.) 2015-01 Sairyū Sha ISBN 978-4-7791-2108-1
- (Special Volume) : Mohaya Uchū wa Meikyū no Kagami no yōni (もはや宇宙は迷宮の鏡のように, Now the Cosmos is Like the Mirrors of Labyrinth) 2017-07 Sairyū Sha ISBN 978-4-7791-2110-4, This book is not contained in the Complete Collection, but is essentially the part of the collection. After the Complete collection had been released, this book was published.

== Novels adapted into manga and anime ==
- Big Wars
- Kantai Series (艦隊シリーズ)
  - Konpeki no Kantai Series (紺碧の艦隊シリーズ)
  - Kyokujitsu no Kantai Series (旭日の艦隊シリーズ)

== Selected works translated into English ==
- The Sacred Era (神聖代, Shinsei-dai) amazon.com page
- "'Soft Clocks" (柔らかい時計, Yawarakai Tokei), a novelette

== Notes and references ==
- List of Seiun Award
