= Shinya Ōtaki =

Japanese voice actor

Shin'ya Ōtaki (大滝 進矢, Ōtaki Shin'ya; born July 29, 1953 in Kanagawa Prefecture, Japan), previously known as Susumu Kotaki (小滝 進, Kotaki Susumu), is a Japanese voice actor. Currently working as a freelancer.

== Anime ==
=== TV ===
- Combat Mecha Xabungle (Jiron Amos)
- Crayon Shin-chan (Kantamu Robo, Nene's father)
- Dancouga – Super Beast Machine God (Francis)
- Detective Academy Q (Detective Ikematsu)
- Flame of Recca (Daikoku)
- Fullmetal Alchemist (the older Slicer brother)
- Gyakuten! Ippatsuman (Tamashirō Nabari)
- Ginga Hyōryū Vifam 13 (narration)
- Idol Angel Yokoso Yoko (Toshio Harada)
- Mado King Granzort (Granzort, Super Granzort)
- Kimagure Orange Road (Ōtsuka-sensei)
- Koroke! (Meringue)
- Machine Robo: Battle Hackers (R. JeTan, Blue Jet)
- Machine Robo: Revenge of Cronos (Blue Jet)
- Mirai Keisatsu Urashiman (Stinger Hawk)
- Mister Ajikko (Ichirō Abe, Jirō Abe)
- Mobile Fighter G Gundam (Chico Rodriguez)
- Mobile Suit Gundam Wing (Doktor S)
- Mobile Suit Gundam ZZ (Ariasu Moma)
- Mobile Suit Zeta Gundam (Mezūn Mekkusu)
- Moeru! Oni-san (Police Chief, Jirō Kaibushi)
- Nadia: The Secret of Blue Water (Holland)
- Nintama Rantarō (Tsujiemon Rokudō)
- Saber Marionette J to X (Ryūichi Watanabe)
- Tekkaman Blade (General Colbert)
- Weekly Story Land (You Man, Detective, Manager, Coach)

=== OVA ===
- Baoh (Masked Man)
- Bondage Queen Kate (Jones)
- Bubblegum Crisis (Deputy Commander)
- Dancougar - Super Beast Machine God: God Bless Dancougar (Francis)
- Domain of Murder (Master)
- The Heroic Legend of Arslan (Shapūru)
- Mado King Granzort series (Granzort, Super Granzort, Hyper Granzort)
- Konpeki no Kantai (Yajirō Shinagawa, Earhart Goering)
- Kyokujitsu no Kantai (Earhart Goering)
- Legend of the Galactic Heroes (Isaac Fernand von Turneisen)
- Mobile Suit Gundam 0083: Stardust Memory (Nakaha Nakato)

=== Movies ===
- Xabungle Graffiti (Jiron Amos)
- Crayon Shin-chan: Adventure in Henderland (Kantamu Robo)
- Crayon Shin-chan: Buri Buri 3 Minutes Charge (Kantamu Robo)
- Crayon Shin-chan: Pursuit of the Dark Tama Tama (Lemon)
- The Heroic Legend of Arslan (Shapūru)
- Mobile Suit Gundam 0083: The Last Blitz of Zeon (Nakaha Nakato)

== Games ==
- Super Robot Wars series (Ariasu Moma, Jiron Amos, Blue Jet)

== Tokusatsu ==
- Andromeros (Andromarus (voice))

== Dubbing voice-over ==
=== Live action ===
- Yuen Biao
  - Winners and Sinners (CID Agent)
  - Twinkle, Twinkle, Lucky Stars (Fung)
  - Eastern Condors ("Weasel" / Chieh Man-yeh)
- The 13th Warrior (Herger (Dennis Storhøi))
- All the Right Moves (Greg (Gary Graham))
- Blue Steel (1993 Fuji TV edition) (Howard (Matt Craven))
- The Crow (Detective Torres (Marco Rodríguez))
- Cyborg (VHS edition) (Marshall Strat)
- Dumb and Dumber (Nicholas Andre)
- Hocus Pocus (Billy Butcherson (Doug Jones))
- Jacob's Ladder (1993 NTV edition) (Frank (Eriq La Salle))
- JAG (CIA Special Agent Clayton Webb)
- L.A. Law (Michael Cusack)
- Live and Let Die
- Never Say Never Again
- The Time Machine (David Philby (Mark Addy))

=== Animation ===
- Batman: The Animated Series (Lucas)
- Courage the Cowardly Dog (Fred)
- The Real Ghostbusters (Winston Zeddmore)
