= Blue Breaker: Ken yori mo hohoemi o =

- Cover of PC-FX version
- Developer: HuneX
- Publisher: NEC
- Series: Blue Breaker
- Platforms: PC-FX, Sega Saturn, PlayStation
- Release: PC-FX: JP: September 27, 1996; Sega Saturn: JP: November 28, 1997; PlayStation: JP: December 25, 1997
- Genres: Dating sim, role-playing

Blue Breaker: Ken yori mo hohoemi o (Note: Japanese: Blue Breaker 〜剣よりも微笑みを〜, Hepburn: Blue Breaker 〜 Ken yori mo hohoemi o 〜; lit. Blue Breaker: More Smile Than Sword) is a 1996 video game developed by HuneX for the PC-FX video game system. It is a hybrid of role-playing game and dating sim. It was later ported to the Sega Saturn in 1997.

It was released as Blue Breaker: Egao no yakusoku (Note: Blue Breaker 〜笑顔の約束〜, Blue Breaker 〜Egao no yakusoku〜; lit. Blue Breaker: Promise of a Smile) for the PlayStation in 1997.

== Gameplay ==
The game combines both role-playing video games (RPG) and dating sim gameplay. Famitsu magazine reviewers described it as being more of a dating sim than an RPG and described it as a bishōjo game. These are games where the playable male character interacts with attractive anime-styled girls.

== Release ==
Blue Breaker: Ken yori mo hohoemi o was published for the PC-FX by NEC-HE on September 27, 1996. The game was ported to the Sega Saturn and released in Japan on November 28, 1997.

Blue Breaker: Egao no yakusoku was released for the PlayStation on December 25, 1997. There are changes in the PlayStation game, such as added events and adjusted game balance. The Sega Saturn and PlayStation versions were published by Human Entertainment.

== Reception ==
Reception

Review scores
Publication	Score
Famitsu	6/10, 6/10, 6/10, 6/10 (PS)
Saturn Fan	5.6/10 (SS)
Sega Saturn Magazine	5/10, 7/10, 5/10 (SS)

Reviewers in Saturn Fan magazine found the game lacking as an RPG, particularly in terms of gameplay balance. Another reviewer commented that they initially found the game somewhat bland, but grew more immersed as they progressed. Two other reviewers found the battle scenes underwhelming or frustrating, as there were noticeably long load times when spells were cast. One reviewer in Sega Saturn Magazine found it superior to the PC-FX version due to its superior amount of colors and sound on the Saturn hardware, and that it had a large amount of secrets for enthusiasts of the genres to find. The other reviewers found the gameplay objectives unclear and that the graphics resembled those of earlier Family Computer.

Reviewing the PlayStation version in Famitsu, Hamamura Tsūshin found it fun as a dating sim. At the same time, another reviewer said it was too monotonous for a dating sim, and another said both the dating-sim and RPG elements felt half-baked.
