= First Kiss Story =

1998 video game

- PlayStation cover, featuring Kana Orikura
- Developer: HuneX
- Publishers: NEC-HE (PC-FX); Human Entertainment (PS)
- Platforms: PC-FX, PlayStation, PlayStation 2 (Stories)
- Release: PC-FX: JP: April 24, 1998; PlayStation: JP: November 26, 1998
- Genre: Visual novel
- Mode: Single player

First Kiss Monogatari (Japanese: ファーストKiss☆物語, Hepburn: Fāsuto Kiss☆Monogatari; translated "First Kiss☆Story") (Note: Normally 物語 would be read as monogatari, the Japanese word for story, but the ruby characters show that for this game it should be read as ストーリー (sutōrī, lit. 'story'). The title would then be romanized as Fāsuto Kiss Sutōrī, sounding the same in Japanese as in English.) is a romance visual novel developed by HuneX. It was originally released for the PC-FX on April 24, 1998, and was the last game to be released for the system. It received a port to the PlayStation in the same year on November 26. The PlayStation version had additional content and used two CDs instead of one. It is followed by an OVA anime sequel and First Kiss Story II. The game, along with its sequel, were ported to the PlayStation 2 in First Kiss Stories.

== Story ==
Average gameplay, showing a conversation where Manami asks the player character if she can call him onii-chan (big brother).

The main character, Yoshihiko Mizusawa, is one month away from graduating from high school. Due to his father's sudden transfer, he ends up staying at his father's acquaintance's house in Akizuki City. It was a household of a mother and two daughters. Although the younger sister, Manami, gets attached to him, her older sister, Kana, completely dislikes him, and he begins to live a freeloader life with complicated feelings.

In addition to that, he also experiences encounters and interactions with various women, including juniors at school and girls in the hospital. Who is the woman with whom the protagonist is destined to have his first kiss?

== Adaptations ==
A single episode OVA sequel to the first game was released on Valentine's Day of 2000. It was directed by Kan Fukumoto.

The plot is as follows: High school senior Kana Orikura has felt lonely ever since her boyfriend Yoshihiko left for college. When a handsome new school teacher named Shogo Hayakawa arrives at her school, she falls in love with him because of his resemblance to her father Yuichi, who died a few years ago. The teacher turns out to be her father's cousin, and stays with her and her family at their house.
