= HuneX =

Japanese video game developer

- Industry: Video games
- Founded: October 1992
- Headquarters: Japan
- Parent: NEC Home Electronics, Ltd., Human
- Website: www.hunex.co.jp

HuneX is a video game developer formed as a partnership between NEC Home Electronics, Ltd. and Human in 1992. HuneX mainly produces Bishōjo games and Otome games.

== Overview ==
Established in October 1992 as a game software development subsidiary of NEC Home Electronics and Human, it initially developed PC Engine titles. At the time of its establishment, Human held a 51% stake and NEC Home Electronics held 49%. The company had 20 employees at the time of its establishment. The company was located in the same building as Human, and the president was also the president of Human, Choshiro Suzuki.

Since 2014, the brand has been operating under the name "dramatic create."

== Games ==
- 77: Beyond the Milky Way
- Aikagi: Nukumori to Hidamari no Naka de
- All Japan Women's Pro Wrestling: Queen of Queens
- Angel Present
- Angel's Feather
- Ayakashibito Portable
- Baldr Force EXE
- Baldr Bullet Equilibrium
- Bijin Dokei Portable
- Biz Taiken DS Series: Kigyoudou - Inshoku -
- Blue Breaker (series)
  - Blue Breaker: Ken yori mo hohoemi o
  - Blue Breaker: Egao no yakusoku
- Canvas 3: Awairo no Sketch
- Canvas 3: Nanairo no Kiseki
- hanter#: Kimi no Uta ga Todoitara
- Clannad (PlayStation 2 version)
- Clover Heart's
- Dear My Sun!!: Musuko Ikusei Kyousoukyoku
- Duel Savior Destiny
- EPHEMERAL: Fantasy On Dark/ Residents of the Dark
- EPHEMERAL: Miniature Garden
- Fate/stay night: Realta Nua / Tobidase! Toraburu Hanafuda Douchuuki
- First Kiss Story
- Formation Soccer '95: Della Serie A
- Gokujō!! Mecha Mote Iinchō series
  - Gokujō!! Mecha Mote Iinchō: MM Town de Miracle Change!
  - Gokujō!! Mecha Mote Iinchō: MM My Best Friend!
- Haru no Ashioto
- Hayate no Gotoku! series
  - Hayate the Combat Butler|Hayate no Gotoku!: Boku ga Romeo de Romeo ga Boku de
  - Hayate no Gotoku!: Ojō-sama Produce Daisakusen Bokuiro ni Somare!
  - Hayate no Gotoku!!: Nightmare Paradise
- Higurashi no Naku Koro ni Matsuri
- Houkago no Love Beat
- Industrial Spy: Operation Espionage
- Izumo: Takeki Tsurugi no Senki
- J-League Tremendous Soccer '94
- Katakamuna: Ushinawareta Ingaritsu
- Kazoku Keikaku
- Komorebi no Namikimichi: Utsurikawaru Kisetsu no Naka de
- Kyuuketsu Kitan Moonties
- Like Life Every Hour
- LoveSongs ADV: Riho Futaba
- Lucian Bee's: Resurrection Supernova
- Lucian Bee's: Evil Violet
- Lucian Bee's: Justice Yellow
- MagusTale Eternity: Sekaiju to Koi suru Mahou Tsukai
- Mahoroba Stories
- Mainichi Kokorobics: DS Therapy
- Majokko a la mode: Tonaete, Koi no Mahou!
- Majokko a la mode II: Mahou to Ken no Struggle
- Megami Paradise II
- Mizuiro
- My Lovey: Choose your Otome story
- Ore no Shita de Agake
- Otometeki Koi Kakumei Love Revo!!
- Party Girls
- Pinky:St Kira-Kira Rainbow Pack
- PW: ProjectWitch
- Real Rode
- Simple series
  - Simple 2000 Series DC Vol. 01: The Renai Adventure - Bittersweet Fools
  - Simple 2000 Series DC Vol. 02: The Renai Simulation - Natsuiro Cerebration
  - Simple 2000 Series DC Vol. 03: The Renai Simulation 2 - Fureai
  - Simple 2000 Series DC Vol. 04: The Renai Adventure - Okaeri!
  - Simple 2000 Series Vol. 2: The Party Game
  - Simple 2000 Series Vol. 8: The Tennis
  - Simple 2000 Series Vol. 9: The Renai Adventure - Bittersweet Fools
  - Simple 2000 Series Vol. 13: The Renai Adventure - Garasu no Mori
  - Simple 2000 Series Vol. 23: The Puzzle Collection 2000-Mon
  - Simple 2000 Series Vol. 26: The Pinball x 3
  - Simple 2000 Series Vol. 38: The Yuujou Adventure - Hotaru Tamashii
  - Simple 2000 Series Vol. 44: The Hajimete no RPG - Densetsu no Keishousha
  - Simple 2000 Series Vol. 45: The Koi to Namida to, Tsuioku to... - Thread Colors: Sayonara no Mukou Gawa
  - Simple 2000 Series Vol. 53: The Camera Kozou
  - Simple 2000 Series Vol. 76: The Hanasou Eikaiwa no Tabi
  - Simple 2000 Series Vol. 77: The Hanasou Kankokugo no Tabi
  - Simple 2000 Series Vol. 89: The Party Game 2
  - Simple 2000 Series Vol. 92: The Noroi no Game
  - Simple 2000 Series Vol. 104: The Robot Tsukurouze! - Gekitou! Robot Fight
  - Simple 2000 Series Ultimate Vol. 1: Love*Smash! Super Tennis Players
  - Simple 2000 Series Ultimate Vol. 5: Love*Mahjong!
  - Simple 2000 Series Ultimate Vol. 10: Love Songs - Idol ga Classmate
  - Simple 2000 Series Ultimate Vol. 11: Wandaba Style
  - Simple 2000 Series Ultimate Vol. 20: Love*Mahjong! 2
  - Simple 2000 Series Ultimate Vol. 26: Love*Smash! 5.1 - Tennis Robo no Hanran
  - Simple DS Series Vol. 6: The Party Game
  - Simple 2500 Series Portable!! Vol. 2: The Tennis
  - Simple 2500 Series Portable!! Vol. 8: Dokodemo Gal Mahjong
- Snoopy to Issho ni DS Eigo Lesson
- Snow
- Solfege: Sweet Harmony
- Soul Link Extension
- Starry Sky (PlayStation Portable ports)
- Steam Prison
- Thread Colors: Sayonara no Mukou Gawa
- Togainu no Chi
- Tomoyo After: It's a Wonderful Life - CS Edition (PlayStation 2 version)
- Tsuki wa Higashi ni Hi wa Nishi ni: Operation Sanctuary
- Tsukihime: A Piece of Blue Glass Moon
- Vitamin X
- Vitamin Y
- Vitamin Z
- Vitamin X to Z
- Wakabayashi Fumie no DS Kabu Lesson
- Welcome to Pia Carrot (series)
- Wind: A Breath of Heart
- Yoake Mae yori Ruriiro na
- Zettai Karen Children DS: Dai-4 no Children
