= PC-FX =

1994 video game console

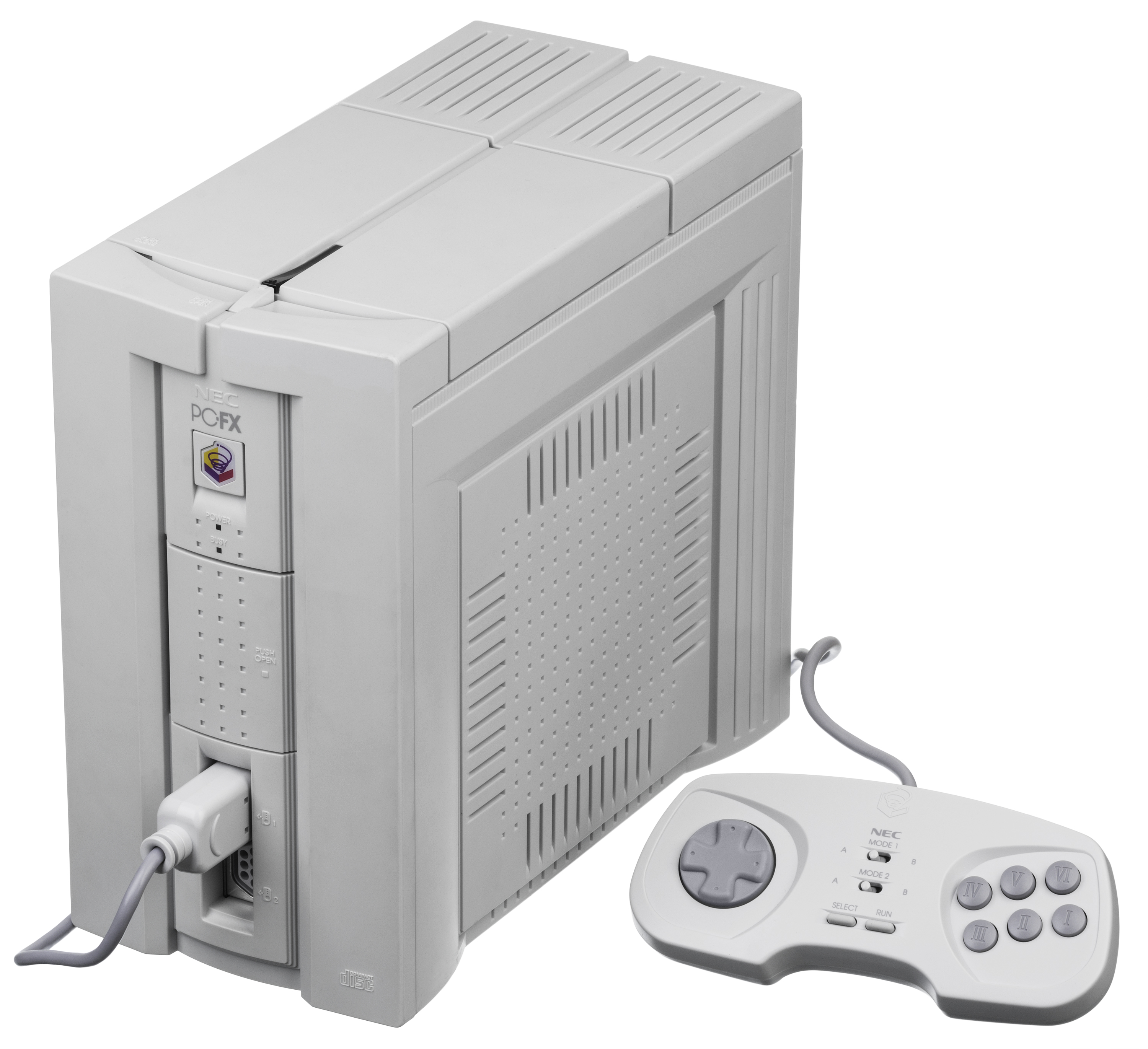
- Developer: NEC, Hudson Soft
- Manufacturer: NEC
- Type: Home video game console
- Generation: Fifth
- Released: JP: December 23, 1994
- Discontinued: JP: February 14, 1998
- Units sold: 300,000
- Media: CD-ROM
- CPU: NEC V810 @ 21.475 MHz
- Memory: 2 MB
- Display: 256x240 to 341x240, 16.77 million colors
- Graphics: HuC6270, HuC6271
- Sound: 16-Bit stereo, two ADPCM Channels, six 5-Bit sample Channels
- Predecessor: TurboDuo

The PC-FX (Note: Japanese: ピーシー エフエックス, Hepburn: Pī Shī Efu Ekkusu) is a 32-bit home video game console co-developed by NEC and Hudson Soft. Released in December 1994, it is based on the NEC V810 CPU and CD-ROM, and was intended as the successor to the PC Engine (known overseas as the TurboGrafx-16). Unlike its predecessor, the PC-FX was only released in Japan.

Its form factor is like that of a tower PC, intended to be similarly upgradeable. The PC-FX was uncompelling in the marketplace due to lack of a 3D polygon-based graphics chip, high price, and limited developer support and is considered a commercial failure. It was discontinued in February 1998 and NEC subsequently exited the home video game console business.

== History ==
In 1987, NEC partnered with game publisher Hudson Soft to create the PC Engine, released internationally as the TurboGrafx-16. The PC Engine was successful in Japan, but the TG-16 struggled in overseas markets.

The success of the PC Engine created a strong relationship between NEC and Hudson, who began work on a true successor (as opposed to the SuperGrafx, an upgraded PC Engine that had been released the year before to low sales and was already discontinued) as early as 1990. The companies designed a prototype system known as "Tetsujin" ("Iron Man"), a 32-bit console with full-screen video playback, 2 megabytes of RAM, and CD-ROM. NEC designed the console itself based on its previous experience with electronics, and Hudson provided the necessary custom chipset and co-processors. The prototype was announced in 1992 and presented to companies that expressed interest. To demonstrate the system's capabilities, Hudson created a version of Star Soldier displaying 3D objects over pre-rendered backdrops. When this presentation garnered considerable support, NEC and Hudson began to move forward with the project.

The Tetsujin was originally set to be released in 1992, but the lack of completed games pushed the launch date to early 1993, which was also skipped. Publications speculated that the PC Engine's continued success in the market made NEC and Hudson reluctant to release a succeeding platform. The release of technologically-superior consoles in late 1993, such as the Atari Jaguar and 3DO Interactive Multiplayer, made the Tetsujin's hardware look more dated by comparison. Publications grew skeptical on how well it would perform in the market due to its inferior hardware and the amount of competing platforms. While NEC and Hudson knew that the system's technology was unimpressive, time constraints prevented them from designing a new one from scratch. Instead, the system was redesigned to resemble a PC tower with slots that allowed for future modules to increase its capabilities. Very little of the hardware itself was changed from the Tetsujin prototype, although it upgraded to a new 32-bit V-810 RISC CPU. The system was renamed to the PC-FX, the "PC" believed to be a nod to the PC Engine brand. Unusual for a fifth generation console, the PC-FX does not have a polygon graphics processor. NEC's reasoning for this was that polygon processors of the time were relatively low-powered, resulting in figures having a blocky appearance, and that it would be better for games to use pre-rendered polygon graphics instead.

The PC-FX was announced in late 1993 and showcased at the 1994 Tokyo Toy Show in June. Presented alongside several competing systems—the PlayStation, Sega Saturn, Neo Geo CD, and Bandai Playdia—its PC tower design was met with ridicule from commentators. Hudson demonstrated FX Fighter, a full-motion video fighting game created in response to Sega's Virtua Fighter, to showcase the system's capabilities. Its smooth-shaded polygonal visuals were met with praise from publications, which contributed to the anticipated launch of the console. The system's target audience was roughly five years older than that of the PC Engine, in hopes that PC Engine fans would be brought over to the successor console. The console was launched in Japan on December 23, 1994 at the price of ¥49,800. In an interview roughly a year before the system launch, a representative stated that NEC had all but ruled out a release outside Japan, concluding that it would most likely sell poorly overseas due to its high price.

The PC-FX was discontinued in early 1998 with only 300,000 units sold.

== Technical specifications ==
PC-FX motherboard	PC-FX motherboard	PC-FX daughterboard

The PC-FX uses CD-ROMs as its storage medium, following on from the expansion released for its HuCard based predecessor. The game controller is virtually identical to a DUO-RX controller, but the rapid fire switches have been replaced with mode A/B switches. Peripherals include a PC-FX mouse, which is supported by strategy games like Farland Story FX and Power DoLLS FX.

The PC-FX uses the HuC6270 and HuC6271 graphic chips, and is able to decompress 30 JPEG pictures per second while playing digitally recorded audio, essentially a form of Motion JPEG. This gives the PC-FX superior full motion video quality over all other fifth generation consoles.

The PC-FX's computer-like form factor was unusual for consoles at the time. It stands upright like a tower computer while other contemporary consoles lay flat, and it has three expansion ports. Similar to the 3DO, it features a built in power supply.

The PC-FX includes an HU 62 series 32-bit system board, an LSI chip, and a 32-bit V-810 RISC CPU. The system can display 16.77 million colors (the same amount as the PlayStation).

Unusual for a fifth generation console, the PC-FX does not have a polygon graphics processor. NEC's reasoning for this was that polygon processors of the time were relatively low-powered, resulting in figures having a blocky appearance, and that it would be better for games to use pre-rendered polygon graphics instead.

== PC-FXGA ==
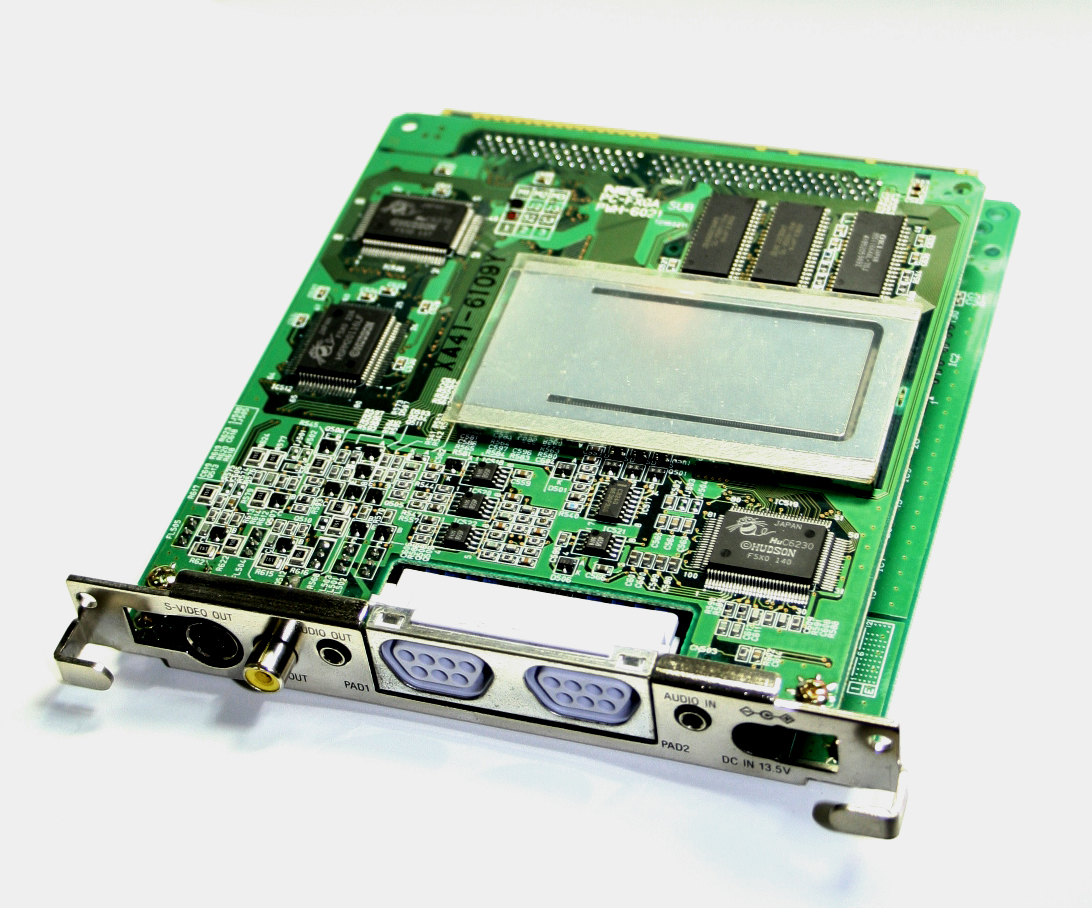
A PC-FXGA for the C-BUS

NEC also released the PC-FXGA ("game accelerator") expansion cards for PC-9800 and DOS/V computers, allowing those computers to play PC-FX games. The PC-9800 version is a combination of two cards, while the DOS/V variant uses a single ISA card. Both cards integrate an additional 3D chipset (Kubota/Hudson HuC6273) over the regular PC-FX. Unlike most computer graphics accelerators of the time, (as well as arguably the most comparable device to it, the Creative Labs 3DO Blaster) the PC-FXGA outputs over a separate video connection rather than from the PC's interface itself. This makes use of the card somewhat cumbersome, as games are still booted using the DOS prompt, and therefore requiring one to use either a second monitor or an input switcher. The relatively high price of the card, coupled with the state of the PC-FX itself, resulted in the card selling poorly, below even the sales of the dedicated PC-FX unit. The card has since become highly sought after by vintage PC hardware collectors due to its scarcity.

== Library ==
The library consists of 62 games. The launch games were Graduation 2: Neo Generation FX, Battle Heat, and Team Innocent on December 23, 1994 and the final game released was First Kiss Story on April 24, 1998. The system and all games were only released in Japan. A number of demo discs were released with publications which allow the user to play the disc in a CD-equipped PC Engine or the PC-FX.

NEC directed Hudson Soft, continuing their partnership over the PC Engine, to develop only games based on popular anime franchises and using prerendered animated footage. Though this policy played to the hardware's strengths, it barred Hudson Soft from bringing successful PC Engine series such as Bomberman and Bonk to the PC-FX.

== Reception ==
Shortly after the PC-FX launched, Famitsu awarded the console an 18 out of 40, one point lower than the score it gave the PlayStation. A writer for Ultimate Future Games in April 1995 said the PC-FX had impressively competitive hardware, but its game library relied largely on animation over gameplay, so readers should "[not] expect much just yet". Game Criticism writers believed the system was troubled by a weak software lineup and a lack of innovation and creativity from NEC, and served as an unsuitable and inferior follow-up to the PC Engine.
