= List of Japanese speculative fiction writers =

This is a list of Japanese speculative fiction writers. Writers are sorted alphabetically by surname.

== A ==
- Kōbō Abe (安部公房, 1924–1993, real name Kimifusa Abe (安部公房)
- Hirotaka Adachi (安達寛高, real name of Otsuichi)
- Jirō Akagawa (赤川次郎, b. 1948)
- Mizuhito Akiyama (秋山瑞人, b. 1971)
- Motoko Arai (新井素子, b. 1960)
- Mizuhito Akiyama (秋山瑞人, b. 1971)
- Kunio Aramaki (荒巻邦夫, real name of Yoshio Aramaki)
- Yoshimasa Aramaki (荒巻義雅, real name of Yoshio Aramaki)
- Yoshio Aramaki (荒巻義雄, b. 1933)
- Hiroshi Aramata (荒俣宏, b. 1947)
- Alice Arisugawa or Arisu Arisugawa (有栖川有栖, b. 1959)
- Taku Ashibe (芦辺拓, b. 1958)
- Yukito Ayatsuji (綾辻行人, b. 1960)

== B–D ==
- Takizawa Bakin (滝沢馬琴, 1767–1848)
- Chen Shunchen (陳舜臣, pseudonym of Chin Shunshin)
- Chen Soon Shin (陳舜臣, pseudonym of Chin Shunshin)
- Kimio Chiba (千葉喜美雄, real name of Ryu Mitsuse)
- Chihitsudō (遅筆堂, pseudonym of Hisashi Inoue)
- Chin Shunshin (陳舜臣, 1924–2015)
- Gakuto Coda, Gakuto Kōda (甲田学人, b. 1977)

== E–G ==
- Toh EnJoe or Tō Enjō (円城塔, b. 1972)
- Taiyo Fujii or Taiyō Fujii (藤井太洋, b. 1971)
- Masako Fukae (深江雅子, real name of Masako Mori)
- Masami Fukushima (福島正実, 1929–1976)

== H ==
- Ryō Hanmura or Ryō Hammura (半村良 1933–2002)
- Hideshi Hino (日野日出志 1946)
- Akira Hori (堀晃 b. 1944)
- Shinichi Hoshi or Shin'ichi Hoshi (星新一 1926-1997)

== I–J ==
- Kimio Iizuka (飯塚喜美雄, real name of Ryu Mitsuse)
- Sumiyo Imaoka (今岡純代, real name of Kaoru Kurimoto)
- Hisashi Inoue (井上ひさし, 1934–2010)
- Fujio Ishihara (石原藤夫, b. 1933)
- Junji Ito or Junji Itō (伊藤潤二. b. 1963)
- Keikaku Itō (伊藤計劃, pseudonym of Project Itoh)
- Satoshi Itō (伊藤聡, real name of Project Itoh)
- Shimako Iwai (岩井志麻子, b. 1964)

== K–L ==
- Shinji Kajio (梶尾真治. b. 1947)
- Chōhei Kambayashi or Chōhei Kanbayashi (神林長平, b. 1953)
- Musashi Kanbe (かんべむさし, b. 1948)
- Hajime Kanzaka (神坂一, b. 1964)
- Kyō Katō (加藤喬, pseudonym of Masami Fukushima)
- Masami Katō (加藤正実, pseudonym of Masami Fukushima)
- Chiaki Kawamata (川又千秋, b. 1948)
- Hideyuki Kikuchi (菊地秀行, b. 1949)
- Yusuke Kishi or Yūsuke Kishi (貴志祐介, b. 1959)
- Morio Kita (北杜夫, 1927–2011)
- Heitarō Kiyono (清野平太郎, real name of Ryō Hanmura)
- Yasumi Kobayashi (小林泰三, b. 1962)
- Gakuto Koda or Gakuto Kōda (甲田学人)
- Izuki Kogyoku or Izuki Kōgyoku (紅玉いづき, b. 1984)
- Minoru Komatsu (小松実, real name of Sakyo Komatsu)
- Sakyo Komatsu or Sakyō Komatsu (小松左京, 1931–2011)
- Chiaki J. Konaka or Chiaki Konaka (小中千昭, b. 1961)
- Yoji Kondo or Yōji Kondō (近藤陽次, 1933–2017)
- Eric Kotani, pseudonym of Yoji Kondo)
- Rei Kozumi (小隅黎, pseudonym of Takumi Shibano)
- Kaoru Kurimoto (栗本薫, 1953–2009)
- Ken Kuronuma (黒沼健, 1902–1985)

== M ==
- Gorō Masaki (柾悟郎, b. 1957)
- Jun Masaki (真木じゅん, pseudonym of Jun'ya Yokota)
- Taku Mayumura (眉村卓, b. 1934)
- Gakuto Mikumo (三雲岳斗, b. 1970)
- Hiroko Minagawa (皆川博子, b. 1930)
- Ryu Mitsuse or Ryū Mitsuse (光瀬龍, 1928–1999)
- Miyuki Miyabe (宮部みゆき, b. 1960)
- Masako Mori (森真沙子, b. 1944)
- Hiroyuki Morioka (森岡浩之, b. 1962)
- Daijiro Morohoshi (諸星大二郎, b. 1949) manga artist
- Haruki Murakami (村上春樹, b. 1949)

== N ==
- Norio Nakai (中井紀夫, b. 1952)
- Azusa Nakajima (中島梓, pseudonym of Kaoru Kurimoto)
- Azusa Noa (野阿梓, b. 1954)
- Hōsuke Nojiri (野尻抱介, b. 1961)
- Asa Nonami (乃南アサ, b. 1960)
- Mahokaru Numata (沼田まほかる, b. 1948)

== O–R ==
- Kenzaburō Ōe (大江健三郎, b. 1935)
- Issui Ogawa (小川一水, b. 1975)
- Noriko Ogiwara (荻原規子, b. 1959)
- Mariko Ōhara (大原まり子, b. 1959)
- Fuyumi Ono (小野不由美, b. 1960)
- Masaari Oshikawa (押川方存, real name of Shunrō Oshikawa)
- Shunrō Oshikawa (押川春浪, 1876–1914)
- Otsuichi (乙一, b. 1978)
- Project Itoh or Keikaku Itō (伊藤計劃, 1974–2009)
- Ryukishi07 (竜騎士07, b. 1973)

== S ==
- Hiroshi Sakurazaka (桜坂洋, b. 1970)
- Shōichi Sano (佐野昌一, real name of Unno Juza)
- Yūichi Sasamoto (笹本祐一, b. 1963)
- Daisuke Satō (佐藤大輔, 1964–2017)
- Sōkichi Saitō (斎藤宗吉, real name of Morio Kita)
- Hideaki Sena (瀬名秀明, b. 1968)
- Takumi Shibano (柴野拓美, 1926–2010)
- Tatsuhiko Shibusawa (澁澤龍彦, 1928–1987)
- Tatsuo Shibusawa (澁澤龍雄, real name of Tatsuhiko Shibusawa)
- Yoshinori Shimizu (清水義範, b. 1947)
- Kazuma Shinjō (新城カズマ)
- Setsuko Shinoda (篠田節子, b. 1955)
- Hiroe Suga (菅浩江, b. 1963)
- Taidō Sugiyama (杉山泰道, real name (Buddhist name) Yumeno Kyūsaku)
- Koji Suzuki, Kōji Suzuki (鈴木光司, 1957–2026)

== T ==
- Kiyoshi Takayanagi (高柳清, real name of Chōhei Kambayashi)
- Haruka Takachiho (高千穂遙, b. 1951)
- Akimitsu Takagi (高木彬光, 1920–1995)
- Seiichi Takagi (高木誠一, real name of Akimitsu Takagi)
- Katsuhiko Takahashi (高橋克彦, b. 1947)
- Haneko Takayama (高山羽根子, b. 1975)
- Kimiyoshi Takekawa (竹川公訓, real name of Haruka Takachiho)
- Kōshū Tani (谷甲州, b. 1951)
- Nagaru Tanigawa (谷川流, b. 1970)
- Hirotaka Tobi (飛浩隆, b. 1960)
- Eiji Tsuburaya (円谷英二, 1901–1970)
- Eiichi Tsumuraya (圓谷英一, real name of Eiji Tsuburaya)
- Yasutaka Tsutsui (筒井康隆, b. 1934)

== U–V ==
- Tow Ubukata or Tō Ubukata (冲方丁, b. 1977)
- Naoyuki Uchida (内田直行, real name of Yukito Ayatsuji)
- Hisashi Uchiyama (内山廈, pseudonym of Hisashi Inoue)
- Sayuri Ueda (上田早夕里, b. 1964)
- Masahide Uehara (上原正英, real name of Alice Arisugawa)
- Nahoko Uehashi (上橋菜穂子, b. 1962)
- Kazuo Umezu (楳図かずお, b. 1936) manga artist
- Unno Juza, Unno Jūza, or Unno Jūzō (海野十三, 1897–1949)
- Gen Urobuchi (虚淵玄, b. 1972)

== W–Z ==
- Soichiro Watase or Sōichirō Watase (渡瀬草一郎, b. 1978)
- Masaki Yamada (山田正紀, b. 1950)
- Bochō Yamamura (山村暮鳥, 1884–1924)
- Tetsu Yano (矢野徹, 1923–2004)
- Jun'ya Yokota (横田順彌 or 横田順弥, 1945–2019)
- Baku Yumemakura (夢枕獏, b. 1951)
- Yumeno Kyūsaku (夢野久作, 1889–1936)

== See also ==
- List of fantasy authors
- List of horror fiction writers
- List of science fiction authors
- List of Japanese writers
  - List of Japanese women writers
- List of Japanese-language poets
- Lists of writers
