= Science Fiction and Fantasy Writers of Japan =

Japanese science fiction writers' organization

Science Fiction and Fantasy Writers of Japan, or SFWJ (Japanese official name: 日本SF作家クラブ, Nihon SF Sakka Club) is an organization of SF-related people, professional or semi-professional. It was formerly a friendship organization, but it is a general incorporated association since August 24, 2017.

== Mission ==
There are three missions in SFWJ.

- SFWJ promotes mutual friendship of members.
- SFWJ establishes and operates award(s) such as Nihon SF Taisho Award.
- SFWJ manages various activities in relation with the above award(s).

== Membership ==
Though the official English name of the organization is "Science Fiction and Fantasy Writers of Japan", members are not limited to writer. Translator, editor, artist, creator, or promoter/ contributor in various genres in relation with SF and/or fantasy, professional or semi-professional, is granted to be a member, if a candidate is acknowledged by the organization.

== History ==
SFWJ was founded on 3 March 1963 at Shinjuku, Tokyo, Japan. The founder members are 11 persons who are Takashi Ishikawa, Sakyo Komatsu, Tetsurō Kawamura, Morihiro Saitō (JA), Hakukō Saitō, Ryo Hanmura, Masami Fukushima, Shinichi Hoshi, Ryu Mitsuse, Yū Mori (Hiroshi Minamiyama JA) and Tetsu Yano. They were SF-related writers, translators, and editors.

The club was a friendship group and the secretariat was located at Hayakawa Publishing, Tokyo at first. There was no president, but Masami Fukushima who was editor in chief of S-F Magazine was substantial president. The head of the club was also its chief of secretariat.

After the death of Fukushima in 1976, Shin'ichi Hoshi took office as president of the club.

Taiyo Fujii is a president of the organization as of March, 2018.

== List of presidents and chiefs of secretariat ==
N	Period	President	N	Secretariat	Remarque
-	1963 - ?	-	1st	Ryō Hanmura (JA)	1963 - ?
-	? -1973	-	2nd	Shōji Ōtomo (JA)	? -1973
-	1973 - 1975	-	3rd	Tadashi Kōsai (JA)	1973 - 1977
1st	1976 - 1977	Shinichi Hoshi (JA)	3rd	Tadashi Kōsai (JA)	1973 - 1977
2nd	1978 - 1979	Tetsu Yano (JA)	4th	Taku Mayumura (JA)	
3rd	1980 - 1983	Sakyo Komatsu (JA)	5th	Yasutaka Tsutsui (JA)	
4th	1984 - 1985	Yasutaka Tsutsui (JA)	6th	Aritsune Toyota JA)	
5th	1986 - 1987	Aritsune Toyota (JA)	7th	Kōji Tanaka JA	
6th	1988 - 1991	Kōji Tanaka (JA)	8th	Chiaki Kawamata (JA)	1988 - 1989
6th	1988 - 1991	Kōji Tanaka (JA)	9th	Masaki Yamada (JA)	1990 - 1990
6th	1988 - 1991	Kōji Tanaka (JA)	10th	Jun'ya Yokota (JA)	1991 - 1991
7th	1992 - 1993	Chiaki Kawamata (JA)	11th	Haruka Takachiho (JA)	
8th	1994 - 1995	Baku Yumemakura (JA)	12th	Kazuhito Morishita (JA)	
9th	1996 - 1999	Gō Nagai (JA)	13th	Haruka Takachiho (JA)	
10th	1999 - 2001	Mariko Ōhara (JA)	14th	Eiichirō Saitō (JA)	
10th	1999 - 2001	vice Mari Kotani (JA)	14th	Eiichirō Saitō (JA)	
11th	2001 - 2003	Chōhei Kanbayashi (JA)	15th	Yōichi Shimada (JA)	
12th	2003 - 2005	Masaki Yamada (JA)	16th	Yasuhiro Takeda (JA)	
13th	2005 - 2007	Kōshū Tani (JA)	17th	Tsukasa Tōno (JA)	
14th	2007 - 2009	Haruka Takachiho (JA)	18th	Saori Kumi (JA)	
15th	2009 - 2011	Motoko Arai (JA)	19th	Masahiko Inoue (JA)	
16th	2011 - 2013	Hideaki Sena (JA)	20th	Mamoru Masuda (JA)	
17th	2013 - 2015	Tsukasa Tōno (JA)	21st	Naohiko Kitahara (JA)	2013 - 2014
17th	2013 - 2015	Tsukasa Tōno (JA)	22nd	Hiroyuki Morioka (JA)	2014 - 2016
18th	2015 - 2018	Taiyō Fujii (JA)	22nd	Hiroyuki Morioka (JA)	2014 - 2016
18th	2015 - 2018	Taiyō Fujii (JA)	23rd	Yūko Itō (JA)	2016 - 2018
19th	2018 - 2020	Jōji Hayashi (JA)	24th	Kiyomi Kishima (JA)	
20th	2020 - 2022	Haruna Ikezawa (JA)	25th	Yoko Enoki (JA)	
21st	2022 -	Hirotaka Ōsawa (JA)	26th	Hana Ageha (JA)	

== Member list ==
Member list of the SFWJ as of February 5, 2018 :

=== Honorary members ===
- Tōru Arimura (有村 とおる, JA, 1945 - ) writer
- Kenji Iguchi (井口 健二, JA, 1949 - ) SF researcher
- Akira Kagami (鏡 明, JA, January 2, 1948 - ) translator, writer
- Shinji Kajio (梶尾 真治, JA, December 24, 1947 - ) writer
- Naoyuki Katō (加藤 直之, JA, 1952 - ) illustrator
- Musashi Kanbe (かんべ むさし, JA, January 16, 1948 - ) writer
- Tadashi Kōsai (高齋 正, JA, December 21, 1938 - ) automobile critic, writer
- Masaki Tsuji (辻 真先, JA, March 23, 1932 - ) anime scenario writer, comic author
- Jinsei Chō (張 仁誠, JA, 1952 - ) illustrator /uncertain/
- Yasutaka Tsutsui (筒井 康隆, JA, September 24, 1934 - ) writer, dramatist
- Hiroshi Minamiyama (南山 宏, JA, July 29, 1937 - ) editor, translator, occult researcher, (alias: Yū Mori, 森 優)
- Baku Yumemakura (夢枕 獏, JA, January 1, 1951 - ) writer, essayist

=== Current members ===
Note: List as of February 5, 2018 :

==== Surname - A, I, U, E, O ====
- Kazu Aoki (青木 和, JA, December 27, 1961 - ) writer
- Hideko Akao (赤尾 秀子, JA) translator
- Kan Akiyama (秋山 完, JA, December 22, 1960s - ) writer /uncertain/
- Norihiko Asao (浅尾 典彦, /uncertain/) media writer
- Taku Ashibe (芦辺 拓, JA, May 21, 1958 - ) mystery writer
- Tsuyoshi Abe (阿部 毅, /uncertain/)
- Hiroyasu Amase (天瀬 裕康, JA, November, 1931 - ) writer, SF fan, (alias: Susumu Watanabe, 渡辺 晋)
- Godō Amano? (天野 護堂, /uncertain/)
- Hotori Amano (天野 邊, /uncertain/) writer
- Motoko Arai (新井 素子, JA, August 8, 1960 - ) writer
- Yoshio Aramaki (荒巻 義雄, JA, April 12, 1933 - ) writer, critic
- Fumihiko Iino (飯野 文彦, JA, June 16, 1961 - ) writer
- Haruna Ikezawa (池澤 春菜, JA, December 15, 1975 - ) voice actress, essayist
- Muneo Ishikawa (石川 宗生, /uncertain/) writer
- Yoshiyuki Ishiwa (石和 義之, 1962 - ) critic
- Tsuyoki Isobe (礒部 剛喜, /uncertain/) critic
- Ban Ippongi (一本木 蛮, JA, January 4, 1965 - ) manga artist, cosplayer
- Tsuyoshi Inoue (井上 剛, JA, 1964 - ) writer
- Masahiko Inoue (井上 雅彦, JA, January 13, 1960 - ) writer
- Takayuki Ino (伊野 隆之, JA, 1961 - ) writer
- Keiichirō Urahama (浦浜 圭一郎, JA, April 23, 1963 - ) writer
- Yū Esaka (江坂 遊, JA, September 20, 1953 - ) vs story writer
- Yōko Enoki (榎木 洋子, JA, October 3, ? - ) writer
- Tadashi Ōta (太田 忠司, JA, February 24, 1959 - ) mystery writer
- HIroyuki Ōhashi (大橋 博之, JA, 1959 - ) free writer, editor
- Mariko Ōhara (大原 まり子, JA, March 20, 1959 - ) writer
- Hajime Ōwada (大和田 始, 1949 - ) SF researcher, writer
- Akira Okawada (岡和田 晃, JA, 1981 - ) critic, translator
- Satoshi Ogawa (小川 哲, JA, December 25, 1986 - ) writer
- Yūki Oginome (荻野目 悠樹, JA, February 2, 1965 - ) writer
- Tsutomu Oshizawa (忍澤 勉, 1956 - ) critic, writer

==== Surname - K ====
- Makio Kaji (加地 真紀男, /uncertain/) editor
- Chise Kasuya (粕谷 知世, JA, 1961 - ) writer
- Junichi Kadokura (門倉 純一, /uncertain/) music critic?
- Motoyuki Kanae (鼎 元亨, /uncertain/) critic
- Azami Kanō (狩野 あざみ, /uncertain/) writer
- Chiaki Kawamata (川又 千秋, JA, December 4, 1948 - ) writer, critic
- Kiyomi Kishima (鬼嶋 清美, 1971 - ) /uncertain/
- Shinji Kimoto (機本 伸司, JA, 1956 - ) writer, movie director, /uncertain/
- Sanzō Kusaka (日下 三蔵, JA, February 21, 1968 - ) SF, mystery researcher
- Jin Kusakami (草上 仁, JA, December 20, 1959 - ) writer
- Gengen Kusano (草野 原々, JA, April 16, 1990 - ) writer
- Saori Kumi (久美 沙織, JA, April 30, 1959 - ) writer, essayist
- Ryō Kodachi (木立 嶺, /uncertain/) writer
- Mari Kotani (小谷 真理, JA, July 11, 1958 - ) critic
- Bin Konno (今野 敏, JA, September 27, 1955 - ) writer, manga author

==== Surname - S ====
- Eiichirō Saitō (斉藤 英一朗, JA, July 16, 1952 - ) writer
- Yoshihiro Shiozawa (塩澤 快浩, JA, 1968 - ) editor
- Sami Shinosaki (篠崎 砂美, JA, July 22, 1960 - ) writer
- Katsuie Shibata (柴田 勝家, JA, October 3, 1987 - ) writer
- Yōichi Shimada (嶋田 洋一, JA, 1956 - ) translator
- Riri Shimada (縞田 理理, May 25, ? - ) writer
- Kei Shimojima (霜島 ケイ, JA, April 18, 1963 - ) writer
- Yumiko Shirai (白井 弓子, JA, March 15, 1967 - ) manga artist
- Kazuma Shinjō (新城 カズマ, JA) writer
- Masaaki Shindo (新戸 雅章, JA, September 18, 1948 - ) critic, writer, translator
- Shinobu Suga (須賀 しのぶ, JA, November 7, 1972 - ) writer
- Satoru Seki (関 智, JA, March 26, 1957 - ) editor, game producer
- Ryūji Seki (関 竜司, JA, /uncertain/) critic

==== Surname - T ====
- Shin Takai (高井 信, JA, July 27, 1957 - ) writer
- Fumio Takano (高野 史緒, JA, September 14, 1966 - ) writer, novelist
- Maki Takatsuki (高槻 真樹, JA, /uncertain/ ) critic, cinema researcher
- Ryōhei Takahashi (高橋 良平, JA, December 8, 1951 - ) critic, translator, free editor
- Yasuhiro Takeda (武田 康廣, JA, September 12, 1957 - ) representative of GAINAX
- Tōya Tachihara (立原 透耶, JA, February 8, 1969 - ) writer, translator (Chinese)
- Takayuki Tatsumi (巽 孝之, JA, May 15, 1965 - ) scholar of American literature, critic
- Ryūichi Taniguchi (タニグチ リウイチ, 1965 - ) commentator, writer
- Kōshū Tani (谷 甲州, JA, March 30, 1951 - ) writer
- Denis Taillandier (タヤンディエー・ドゥニ, /not sure/ - ) critic
- Tokio Tsumori (津守 時生, JA, /uncertain/ ) writer
- Tsukasa Tōno (東野 司, JA, 1957 - ) writer
- Hirotaka Tobi (飛 浩隆, JA, 1960 - ) writer

==== Surname - N ====
- Gō Nagai (永井 豪, JA, September 6, 1945 - ) manga artist
- Norio Nakai (中井 紀夫, JA, November 20, 1952 - ) writer
- Yasuo Nagayama (長山 靖生, JA, October 30, 1962 - ) critic, anthologist
- Akira Nanao (七尾 あきら, JA, March 31, 1969 - ) light-novel writer
- Hiroyuki Nanba (難波 弘之, JA, September 9, 1953 - ) keyboard-player, composer, writer
- Hiromitsu Nishiwaki (西脇 博光, JA, June 4, 1953 - ) music-composer of sfx film
- Azusa Noa (野阿 梓, JA, 1954 - ) writer

==== Surname - H ====
- Moto Hagio (萩尾 望都, JA, May 12, 1949 - ) manga artist
- Jun'ichirō Hashimoto (橋元 淳一郎, JA, 1947 - ) writer, tutor
- Satoshi Hase (長谷 敏司, JA, March 18, 1974 - ) sf/fantasy writer
- Kei Hattori (服部 桂, N/A, /uncertain/ )
- Jōji Hayashi (林 譲治, JA, February 6, 1962 - ) writer
- Ryūsuke Hikawa (氷川 竜介, JA, February 15, 1958 - ) researcher of anime/sfx
- Reiko Hikawa (ひかわ 玲子, JA, May 17, 1958 - ) writer
- Masamichi Higurashi (日暮 雅通, JA, 1954 - ) writer
- Shinku Hidaka (日高 真紅, N/A, /uncertain/ ) writer
- Mogura Hinoshita (照下 土竜, JA, 1982 - ) writer
- Masao Hirata (平田 真夫, JA, January 6, 1958 - ) novelist
- Yoshiki Hiraya (平谷 美樹, JA, January 25, 1960- ) writer, mystery writer
- Taiyo Fujii (藤井 太洋, JA, 1971 - ) writer
- Shingo Fujisaki (藤崎 慎吾, JA, March 5, 1962 - ) non-fiction writer
- Masaya Fujita (藤田 雅矢, JA, 1961 - ) writer
- Toshirō Fujimoto (藤元 登四郎, JA, 1941 - ) critic, writer
- Makoto Henri (片理 誠, JA, 1966 - ) writer

(Continued)

=== Deceased members ===
List as of July 2024. (Order : Surname A, K, S, T, N, H, M, Y, R, W)

Name	Birth	Death	Genre	Remarks
Hisashi Asakura 浅倉 久志 (JA)	March 29, 1930	February 14, 2010	translator	
Sayako Asaba 浅羽 莢子 (JA)	August 15, 1953	September 18, 2006	translator	
Noriaki Ikeda 池田 憲章 (JA)	January 14, 1955	October 17, 2022	free writer, anime author, sfx critic	
Takashi Ishikawa 石川 喬司 (JA)	September 17, 1930	July 9, 2023	critic, writer	
Hajime Ishida 石田 一 ( - )	1956	December 18, 2014	writer, movie researcher	(uncertain)
Takumi Ishitobi 石飛 卓美 (JA)	1951	May 26, 2014	writer, farmer	
Keikaku Itō 伊藤 計劃 (JA)	October 14, 1974	March 20, 2009	writer	
Shōji Ōtomo 大伴 昌司 (JA)	February 3, 1936	January 27, 1973	editor, movie critic	
Kaoru Kurimoto 栗本 薫 (JA)	February 13, 1953	May 26, 2009	writer, critic	alias:Azusa Nakajima (中島梓)
Hisashi Kuroma 黒丸 尚 (JA)	1951	March 14, 1993	translator	
Sakyō Komatsu 小松 左京 (JA)	January 28, 1931	July 26, 2011	writer, critic, essayist	
Hakukō Saitō 斎藤 伯好 (JA)	January 6, 1935	August 8, 2006	translator	
Takumi Shibano 柴野 拓美 (JA)	October 27, 1926	January 16, 2010	translator, writer, SF researcher	alias:Rei Kozumi (小隅黎)
Hiroshi Takeuchi 竹内 博 (JA)	August 7, 1955	June 27, 2011	special effects movie researcher	
Fumio Tanaka 田中 文雄 (JA)	September 22, 1941	April 12, 2009	film producer, writer	
Osamu Tezuka 手塚 治虫 (JA)	November 3, 1928	February 9, 1989	manga artist, anime director	
Jun'ichi Tomonari 友成純一 (JA)		July 24, 2024	writer	
Aritsune Toyota 豊田 有恒 (JA)	May 25, 1938	November 28, 2023	writer, critic, essayist	
Yūji Nakazato 中里 融司 (JA)	February 4, 1957	June 18, 2009	writer, manga author	
Masahiro Noda 野田 昌宏 (JA)	August 18, 1933	June 6, 2008	TV director, translator, writer	
Ryō Hanmura 半村 良 (JA)	October 27, 1933	March 4, 2002	writer	
Dan Fukami 深見 弾 (JA)	June 15, 1936	July 28, 1992	translator (Russian, Polish)	
Masami Fukushima 福島 正実 (JA)	February 18, 1929	April 9, 1976	editor, translator, writer	(First editor in chief of S-F magazine)
Shin'ichi Hoshi 星 新一 (JA)	September 6, 1926	December 30, 1997	writer, essayist	(First president of the SFWJ)
Takashi Hoshi 星 敬 (JA)	1956	December 2, 2019	SF reseacer, editor	
Hiroshi Manabe 真鍋 博 (JA)	July 3, 1932	October 31, 2000	illustrator, essayist	
Taku Mayumura 眉村 卓 (JA)	October 20, 1934	November 3, 2019	writer, essayist, haiku poet	
Ryū Mitsuse 光瀬 龍 (JA)	March 18, 1928	July 7, 1999	writer	
Masayoshi Yasugi 八杉 将司 (JA)	November 2, 1972	December 12, 2021	writer	
Tetsu Yano 矢野 徹 (JA)	October 5, 1923	October 13, 2004	translator, writer	
Kōichi Yamano 山野 浩一 (JA)	November 27, 1939	July 20, 2017	horse racing critic, writer	
