= Taku Mayumura =

Japanese science fiction writer (1934–2019)

Taku Mayumura 眉村 卓
- Born: October 20, 1934; Nishinari-ku, Osaka, Osaka Prefecture, Japan
- Died: November 3, 2019 (aged 85); Abeno-ku, Osaka, Osaka Prefecture, Japan
- Occupation: Writer
- Spouse: Etsuko Murakami (m. 1959)
- Children: Tomoko (b.1963)
- Writing career
- Genres: Science fiction, Fantasy, Young adult fiction
- Notable works: Nazo no Tenkōsei, Nerawareta Gakuen, Shōmetsu no Kōrin, Hikishio no Toki, Meikyūmonogatari, Tsuma ni Sasageta 1778-wa
- Notable awards: Prize at the 1st Kūsōkagaku Shōsetsu Contest (1961), Izumi Kyōka Prize (1979), Seiun Award (1974), (1996)

Taku Mayumura (眉村 卓 Mayumura Taku, 20 October 1934 – 3 November 2019) was a Japanese novelist, science fiction writer and haiku poet. He won the Seiun Award for Novel twice. His novel Shiseikan (司政官, Administrator, one story of the "Shiseikan series"), written in 1974, was translated into English by Daniel Jackson in 2004. Mayumura was also a young adult fiction writer whose works have been adapted into TV drama, film, and anime. Mayumura was an honorary member of the SFWJ (Science Fiction and Fantasy Writers of Japan).

== Biography ==
Mayumura was born as Murakami Takuji (村上 卓児), at Osaka city, Osaka Prefecture in 1934. He graduated from Osaka University in 1957 with a degree in economics, as well as a judo competition career at the Nanatei league. After graduation, he joined a company. While working at this company, he wrote short novels and submitted them to contests in commercial literary magazines.

He started professionally as a copywriter.

In 1960, he joined the SF fanzine Uchūjin. In 1961, he won the Best Story prize in the 1st Kūsō-Kagaku Shōsetsu Contest (later the Hayakawa SF Contest) for his novel Kakyū Aidea-man (Junior Idea-Man) and made his debut in the S-F Magazine with this work.

In 1965, he retired from the company and started working as an independent writer. Mayumura's first book, the science fiction novel Moeru Keisha (燃える傾斜), was published by Tōto Shobo in the same year.

In 1976, his book Psychic School Wars was released, and was later adapted into both live action and anime versions.

In 1979, he won the seventh Izumi Kyōka Prize for Literature and the Seiun Award for his novel Shōmetsu no Kōrin, which is the representative work in his "Shiseikan series". In 1996, he won his second Seiun Award for another entry in the Shiseikan series, the long novel Hikishio no Toki.

His story Toraerareta School Bus inspired the 1986 anime film Toki no Tabibito - Time Stranger.

Mayumura was also a well-known young adult fiction writer. His representative works in this field were Nazo no Tenkousei and Nerawareta Gakuen etc. These works were adapted into TV Drama series by NHK, and adapted into Cinema too. Other juvenile fictions by Mayumura were adapted into the anime Toki no Tabibito.

In 2002, his wife died of cancer. Mayumura had been writing a very short story every day for his wife, who was in the hospital bedridden since the cancer had been diagnosed. When his stories, which were written each day and numbered, reached to 1778, his wife died. These stories were compiled and published. The film Boku to Tsuma no 1778 no Monogatari, based on this true story, was released in 2011.

In 2004, he work Administrator was published in English.

As of 2008, Mayumura was a professor of the Graduate School of Osaka University of Arts.

In 2012, an anime film adaptation was being created of his science fiction children's novel Nerawareta Gakuen, which is a set in a prep school. At that time, the book had also inspired four live-action TV adaptations, and two live-action films.

In 2020, he was posthumously awarded the Meritorious Service Award in its 40th Nihon SF Taishō Awards by the Science Fiction & Fantasy Writers of Japan (SFWJ).

=== Haiku poetry ===
Mayumura was also a haiku poet. He was a member of the haiku club in his high school. He posted his haiku work to the haiku coterie magazine Ashibu (馬酔木) which Shūōshi Mizuhara (JA) presided over. Mayumura has been a coterie membera of the haiku magazine "Uzu" (渦). In 2009, he published a Haiku book "Kiri wo yuku" (霧を行く).

=== Style of writings ===
As a literary theorist, he advocated the "Insider Bungaku-ron" (Theory of Literature by Insiders). Consistent with this theme, his novels frequently tackle the issues of problematic relations between individuals and the corporate or bureaucratic organizations to which they belong.

Mayumura wrote various stories. His stages of the fictions range from the ordinary life scenes of common people to the fantastic worlds hidden back in the daily life, to the inter-stellar federation of far future.

Especially, strange and fantastic aspects of the reality, adjacent to the ordinary life are the essence of his fantastic stories.

== Personal life ==
He died early in the morning (at 04:01 AM in JST) of November 3, 2019 due to aspiration pneumonia in Osaka. His family stated he had been dealing with cancer for several years, and had been hospitalized on October 8, continuing to write in his bed until his death.

== Awards ==
- Prize at the 1st Kūsōkagaku Shōsetsu Contest for Kakyū Aidea-man (下級アイディアマン) 1961
- Izumi Kyōka Prize for Literature (JA) for Shōmetsu no Kōrin (消滅の光輪) 1979
- Seiun Award for Shōmetsu no Kōrin 1979
- Seiun Award for Hikishio no toki (引き潮のとき) 1996

== Works in English translation ==
- Administrator (Kurodahan Press, 2004)
- "Fnifmum" (The Best Japanese Science Fiction Stories, Dembner Books, 1989 / Barricade Books, 1997)
- "I'll Get Rid of Your Discontent" (Speculative Japan, Kurodahan Press, 2007)

== Works ==
=== Novels ===
Novels and Collections of novelettes and short stories, or Collection of short short stories.

- Moeru Keisha (燃える傾斜) 1963, Touto Shobou
- Gen'ei no Kōsei (幻影の構成) 1966, Hayakawa Shobou
- EXPO' 87 (EXPO' 87) 1968, Hayakawa Shobou
- Wa ga Sexoid (わがセクソイド) 1969, Rippu Shobou
- Techunit (テキュニット) 1969, San'ichi Shobou
- Jun B-kyū Shimin (準B級市民) 1966, Hayakawa Publishing, Hayakawa SF Series
- Bankokuhaku ga Yattekuru (万国博がやってくる) 1968, Hayakawa Publishing, Hayakawa SF Series
- Niji wa Kieta (虹は消えた) 1969, Hayakawa Publishing, Hayakawa SF Series
- Toki no Odysseus (時のオデュセウス) 1971, Hayakawa Publishing, Hayakawa SF Series
- C-seki no Kyaku (C席の客) 1971, Nihon Keizai Shinbunsha, 1973, Kadokawa Bunko
- Karera no Naka no Umi (かれらの中の海) 1973, Hayakawa Publishing
- Kiga Rettō (飢餓列島) 1974, Hayakawa Publishing, (collaboration with Masami Fukushima)
- Salon wa Owatta (サロンは終わった) 1974, Hayakawa Bunko JA
- Shiseikan (司政官, Administrator) 1974, Hayakawa Publishing
- Ano Shinju-iro no Asa wo... (あの真珠色の朝を…) 1974, Kadokawa Bunko
- Kimyōna Tsuma (奇妙な妻) 1975, Hayakawa Publishing, 1978 Kadokawa Bunko
- Ikyō Henge (異郷変化) 1976, Kadokawa Bunko
- Nubatama no... (ぬばたまの…) 1978, Koudansha
- Shōmetsu no Kōrin (消滅の光輪) 1979, Hayakawa Publishing
- Bokutachi no Pocket (ぼくたちのポケット) 1980, Kadokawa Bunko
- Nagai Akatsuki (長い暁) 1980, Hayakawa Publishing
- Pocket no ABC (ポケットのABC) 1982, Kadokawa Shoten
- Pocket no XYZ (ポケットのXYZ) 1982, Kadokawa Shoten
- Futsū no Kazoku (ふつうの家族) 1984, Kadokawa Bunko
- Meikyū Monogatari (迷宮物語) 1986, Kadokawa Shoten
- Futeiki Esper (不定期エスパー) 1–8, 1988–1990, Tokuma Shoten
- Hikishio no Toki (引き潮のとき) 1–5, 1988-1995 Hayakawa Publishing
- Wonder Tea Room (ワンダー・ティー・ルーム) 1992, Jitsugyō no nihon
- Higawari Ichiwa, Book 1, Book 2 (日がわり一話, 第1-2集) 1998, Shuppan Geijutsusha
- Tsuma ni Sasageta 1778-wa (妻に捧げた1778話, 1,778 Stories dedicated to My Wife, [Tsuma ni Sasageta Sen Nana-hyaku Nana-jū Hachi-wa]) 2004

etc.

==== Shiseikan series ====
The Shiseikan (Administrator) series is summarized as follows: In the distant future, the humans of Earth constitute the Terrestrial Federation; the Terrestrial humans have spread far across outer space and colonized numerous planets and solar systems. The Federation established local governments on those planets to establish law and order among the human settlers, and to mediate between Terrestrials and the sapient aliens who had been originally born, evolved and lived on certain of these planets before the settlers arrived. In the early period, the planets had been ruled by Federation-aligned military juntas; however, the Federation has begun to recall the military administrations and send civilian administrators to govern on their behalf. The troubles faced by these administrators constitute the stories of Shiseikan.

- Shiseikan (司政官}, Administrators) 1974, Hayakawa Publishing
- Shōmesu no Kourin (消滅の光輪, The Corona of the Extinction) 1979, Hayakawa Publishing, Seiun Award 1979
- Nagai Akatsuki (長い暁, Long Dawn) 1980, Hayakawa Publishing
- Hikishio no Toki (引き潮のとき, The Time at Low Tide) 1996, Hayakawa Publishing, Seiun Award 1996

=== Young adult fiction ===
- Tensai wa Tsukurareru (天才はつくられる) 1968
- Maboroshi no Pen Friend (まぼろしのペンフレンド) 1970, 2006
- Nazo no Tenkōsei (なぞの転校生) 1972, 2004
- Nejireta Machi (ねじれた町) 1974, 2005
- Sangyō Shikan Kōhosei (産業士官候補生) 1974
- Jigoku no Sainō (地獄の才能) 1975
- Nerawareta Gakuen (ねらわれた学園) 1976, 2003
- Omoiagari no Natsu (思いあがりの夏) 1977, Kadokawa Bunko (including Nagori no Yuki 名残の雪)
- Tozasareta Jikanwari (閉ざされた時間割) 1977
- Naitara Shi ga Kuru (泣いたら死がくる) 1977
- Shiroi Futōshiki (白い不等式) 1978
- Tsukurareta Asu (つくられた明日) 1980
- Toraerareta School Bus (とらえられたスクールバス)) 1981-1983 Kadokawa Bunko, (New title: Toki no Tabibito (時空の旅人)
- Shiirareta Henshin (強いられた変身) 1988

=== Historical story ===
- Cartago no Unmei (カルタゴの運命) 1998, Shin Jinbutsu Ōraisha

=== Others or uncertain ===
- Chikyū e no Tōi Michi (地球への遠い道) 1970, Mainichi Shinbunsha
- Nijū-Yo-Jikan no Sinnyūsha (二十四時間の侵入者) 1974, Akimoto
- Waru-nori Ryokō (ワルのり旅行) 1975, Kadokawa Bunko
- Shin'ya Hōsō no Happening (深夜放送のハプニング) 1977, Akimoto
- Mōretsu Kyōshi (猛烈教師) 1977
- Shiroi Kobako (白い小箱) 1977, Jitsugyou no Nihon
- Tōrisugita Yatsu (通りすぎた奴) 1977, Ruppu Shobo
- Henna Otoko (変な男) 1978, Kadokawa Bunko
- Oshaberi Meiro (おしゃべり迷路) 1979, Kadokawa Shoten
- Gekkō no Sasu Basho (月光のさす場所) 1980
- Katamuita Chiheisen (傾いた地平線) 1981, Kadokawa Bunko
- Sorezore no Magarikado (それぞれの曲がり角) 1986, Kadokawa Bunko
- Yūyake no Kaiten Mokuba (夕焼けの回転木馬) 1986, Kadokawa Bunko
- Niji no Uragawa (虹の裏側) 1994, Shuppan Geijutsusha

etc.

=== Essays ===
- Giyaman to Kikai (ぎやまんと機械, Glass and Machine) 1977, PHP Kenkyusho
- Teri-kageri no Fūkei - Kessaku Essay (照りかげりの風景 傑作エッセイ) 1981.12, Kosaido shuppan
- Osaka no Machikado - Mayumura Taku Semba Essay (大阪の街角 眉村卓Sembaエッセイ) 1995.11 San'itsu shobo

=== Haiku poetry ===
- Kiri wo Yuku (霧を行く) 2009

== Works adapted into TV drama ==
- Maboroshi no Pen Friend (まぼろしのペンフレンド) 1974, 2001
- Nazo no Tenkōsei (なぞの転校生) 1975、2014
- Nerawareta Gakuen (ねらわれた学園) 1977, 1982, 1987, 1997
- Jigoku no Sainō (地獄の才能) 1977
- Nagori no Yuki (名残の雪) 1977, 1994

== Works adapted into cinema film ==
- Nerawareta Gakuen (ねらわれた学園) 1981 (Director: (大林宣彦)), 1997 (Director: (清水厚))
- Nazo no Tenkōsei (なぞの転校生) 1998 (Director: (小中和哉))
- Boku to Tsuma no 1778 no Monogatari (僕と妻の1778の物語) based on his life episode and short stories.

== Works adapted into anime film ==
- Toki no Tabibito (時空の旅人) 1986 (Director: Mori Masaki)
- Neo Tokyo (Meikyuu Monogatari) (迷宮物語) 1987 (Directors: Rintaro, Yoshiaki Kawajiri, Katsuhiro Ōtomo)
- Nerawareta Gakuen (ねらわれた学園) 2012 (Director: Ryosuke Nakamura)
