= Azusa Noa =

Japanese writer

Azusa Noah
- Born: 1954 (age 71–72); Fukuoka, Fukuoka prefecture, Japan
- Occupation: Writer
- Writing career
- Genres: Science fiction, Fantasy, Yaoi
- Notable works: The Sinister Angel - Seraphim Hero (1986), The Flower of Babel (1995)
- Notable awards: Prize, 1st rank, in the 5th Hayakawa SF Contest (1979)

Azusa Noah (野阿 梓, Noa Azusa; born 1954) is a Japanese science fiction writer and aesthetic Yaoi novelist. Noah was born in 1954, and made a debut in the S-F Magazine in 1979. His real name and the identity are not in public. He is a member of the Science Fiction and Fantasy Writers of Japan.

== Biography ==
Noah was born in Fukuoka city, Fukuoka prefecture in 1954, as a son of Japanese mystery writer Eitarō Ishizawa (石沢英太郎, 1916–1988). He graduated from the Department of Literature of the Seinan Gakuin University in 1979.

He won the Prize, First rank, in the 5th Hayakawa SF Contest with the story "Hana Kariudo" (花狩人, The Flower Hunter), which he wrote while he was a student in the University. Noah made a debut with this story in the SF-Magazine in the same year.

He is a Japanese SF writer of the 4th generation. There are other 4th generation SF writers such as Chōhei Kambayashi and Mariko Ōhara, Noah debuted contemporarily with them.

Noah's style of stories are highly aesthetic, splendid and stylish. Noah was thought as a female by many people at first, due to his visionary style and the pen name "Adusa". Adusa (梓) is usually female name.

He is familiar with shōjo manga, especially the works by the Year 24 Group. Also his works are characterized by the aesthetic style and have inclination to shōnen-ai situations and world. Thus, aesthetic Yaoi writer Shikiko Yamaai (JA) is his friend. Under the influence of Yamaai and other Yaoi writers, Noah began criticisms of Yaoi and writing Yaoi stories in 1992 Some of his works are fantastic, aesthetic Yaoi novel with sci-fi, occult elements.

=== Style of works ===
Noah's style is aesthetic with visual depiction. His world of fictions ranges from the terrorist fighting with the Galactic Empire, speculative visions of far future Galaxy, and shōnen-ai situations in this stage, Golden Dawn Magics and quantum, psychotic computer, celestial chasing drama of angel and cosmic stranger, occult fantasy, the secret of William Shakespeare and his work Hamlet, to the speculative and sci-fi Yaoi world.

=== Some profiles ===
- The pseudonym "Adusa Noah" came from "Noah's Ark". It is a word game. In AIUEO order of Japanese Kana letters, 1st letter is あ (A), 18th letter is つ (Tsu), 11th letter is さ (Sa). In alphabetic order, 1st letter is "A", 18th letter is "R", and 11th letter is "K", thus ARK is correspondent to "ATsuSa" (あつさ). In classic Japanese, voiced letter such as "du" is written as "tsu".
- Some of Noah's works have subtitle. These subtitles are parody of the titles of the James Joyce's novels.

== Works ==
=== Novels ===
Titles with plus symbol (+) are hard-bound book. Titles with asterisk (*) are Bunko-bon.

- The Flower Hunter (花狩人, Hana Kariudo; *), 1984, ISBN 4-15-030186-7
- Armed Concert (武装音楽祭, Busō Ongakusai; *), 1984, ISBN 4-15-030195-6
- The Sinister Angel - Seraphim Hero (兇天使, Kyō Tenshi; *), 1986, ISBN 978-4-15-030916-9
- Crossing Ceremony of the Galactic Equator - Luciens Wake (銀河赤道祭, Ginga Sekidōsai; *), 1988, ISBN 4-15-030266-9
- The Flower of Babel (バベルの薫り, Baberu no Kaori; +), 1991,
- May Game (五月ゲーム, Gogatsu Geemu; *), 1992,
- Idola Lunaris (月光のイドラ, Gekkō no Idora; +), 1993,
- A Study on Green (緑色研究, Ryokushoku Kenkyū; Book1, Book2 +), 1993, ISBN 4-12-002261-7, ISBN 4-12-002262-5
- The Domain of Arnheim (黄昏郷, Ōgonkyō; +), 1994, ISBN 4-15-207845-6
- The Flower of Babel (バベルの薫り, Baberu no Kaori; Book1, Book2 *), 1995, ISBN 4-15-030515-3, ISBN 4-15-030516-1
- Idola Lunaris (月光のイドラ, Gekkō no Idora), 1996, ISBN 4-12-500399-8
- The Midnight Call (ミッドナイトコール, Middonaito Kōru; *), 1996, ISBN 4-04-435901-6
- Salome, the Prince (少年サロメ, Shōnen Sarome; +), 1998, ISBN 4-06-209468-1
- The Apple in Sodome (ソドムの林檎, Sodomu no Ringo; +), 2001, ISBN 4-15-208367-0
- Berlin Constellation (伯林星列, Berurin Seiretsu; +), 2008, ISBN 978-4-19-862473-6
- The Eclipse of Tsukuyomi (月夜見エクリプス, Tsukuyomi Ekuripusu; +), 2018, ISBN 978-4-19-864700-1

=== Critiques ===
- Commentary to Japanesque SF (ジャパネスクSF試論、Japanesuku SF Shiron), 1993
- "Mystery" for Flowering Girls (花咲く乙女たちの「ミステリ」, Hanasaku Otometachi no "Misuterii"), 1995
