= Ryō Hanmura =

Japanese author (1933–2002)

- Born: Heitarō Kiyono; October 27, 1933; Katsushika, Tokyo, Japan
- Died: March 4, 2002 (aged 68); Chōfu, Tokyo, Japan
- Spouse: Hisae (m.1969)
- Writing career
- Genres: Science fiction, fantasy, horror
- Notable awards: Naoki Prize for Amayadori; 1988 Nihon SF Taisho Award

Ryō Hanmura (Japanese: 半村 良, Hepburn: Hanmura Ryō; October 27, 1933 – March 4, 2002) was a Japanese science fiction, fantasy, and horror author. His name is alternatively transliterated as Ryō Hammura. While he wrote books as Ryō Hanmura his real name was Heitarō Kiyono (清野 平太郎, Kiyono Heitarō).

He won the first Izumi Kyōka Prize for Literature for his novel Musubi no Yama Hiroku (産霊山秘録) in 1973. He won the Naoki Prize for his 1975 novel Amayadori (雨やどり). He won also the 1988 Nihon SF Taisho Award.

One of his novels was the basis of the 1979 film G.I. Samurai (戦国自衛隊, Sengoku Jieitai). A series of role-playing video games called The Legend of Heroes (英雄伝説, Eiyū Densetsu) is loosely based on his novel by the same name.

== Biography ==
Hanmura was born as Kiyono Heitarō at Hondawara-chō, Katsushika, (Note: Hanmura's birth place is Fukagawa according to The Dictionary of Japanese Fantasy Writers (2009).) Tokyo in 1933. He graduated from the Tokyo prefecture Ryogoku high school (両国高等学校). Hanmura experienced and worked in various occupations near 30, such as a plastic forming worker, a bartender, cook's apprentice, staff of advertising agency etc. During those days, Hanmura's short story Shūkaku (収穫) won the third prize in the second Hayakawa SF Contest in 1962, and he debuted in the S-F Magazine in 1963 by this work.

Thanks to his award in the Contest and debut in the S-F Magazine, Hanmura became well-known among the people of the early SF scene in Tokyo. This made him one of the 11 founders of the Science Fiction and Fantasy Writers of Japan, established on 3 March 1963. He took position of a Chief of Secretariat. But Hanmura continued to work in advertising agency till 1970. During this period, Hanmura published almost only one story a year in S-F Magazine. He became a full-time writer in 1970.

Hanmura's novel Ishi no Ketsumyaku, published in 1971, is a grand-scale tale centering on an immortal clan, set against a backdrop of ancient megalithic worship and legends of vampires and werewolves, which Yū Mori (森優, ja, alias Hiroshi Minamiyama) who was an editor in chief of the S-F Magazine at that time named the tale of "denki roman" (ie. legendary romance, 伝奇ロマン).

Hanmura published Musubi no Yama Hiroku in 1973, which is his representative denki roman and he won the Izumi Kyōka Prize for Literature for this work. After this, Hanmura published various denki roman stories such as Ōgon Densetsu, Eiyū Densetsu, and Heike Densetsu, or Yami no Naka no Keizu etc., Among his various denki novels, seven volumes Yōseiden, published in 1975 to 1995, got high reputation and was considered the masterpiece of this genre. Hanmura's epic adventure novel series set on the ancient "Mu Continent", The World of the Sun (太陽の世界), published in 1980 to 1989, is also denki story.

Hanmura wrote stories in the genre of novel of manners. He wrote stories of human warmth in downtown districts. Short novel Amayadori by which Hanmura won the Naoki Prize in 1975, is this genre story. He also wrote Shitamachi Tantei-kyoku in 1977.

Hanmura attempted to combine denki story and shitamachi-ninjō (downtown heart-warmth) story, and the novel in this attempt, Misaki Ichurō no Teikō (岬一郎の抵抗, The Resistance of Misaki Ichirō), won the Nihon SF Taisho Award in 1987. The story depicts the conflict between state power and the common people, through ordinary salary man who gets aware of his super healing power, and tries to pit himself against the state power in tragedy.

He also told and wrote the fantasy stories that evoke the suspense of folklore and the darkness of the underworld, such as Noto Kaii-tan in 1987 or Waga Furusato wa Yomi no Kuni and so. Short suspense novels Bōru-bako (ボール箱) and Akai Shasen (赤い斜線), which are contained in the book Genshi-gai in 1977, are excellent story as well.

Hanmura frequently changed his address. He moved from one place to another. Hanmura had strong inferiority complex in his mind from his young days. He was a graduate of the Tokyo prefecture Ryogoku high school. Most of his class-mates in this high school went to university, even around 40 of them advanced to the University of Tokyo. But Hanmura could not. Some persons said he had created the imaginary personality, which was that of Hanmura Ryo. (Note: Editor Yoshio Nomura stated so. Hanmura himself spoke of his inferiority complex, and sense of self-incongruence.)

Hanmura died on 4 March 2002, Shibuya, Tokyo at the age of 68 due to pneumonia.

=== Chronology ===
According to Kawade Yume Mook

- 1933-10-27 Born at Shibamata, Katsushika in Tokyo as Heitarō Kiyono.
- 1940 Father Shigeru (茂) died when Hanmura was at 1st grade in elementary school.
- 1942 Evacuated to mother's family home in Noto, Ishikawa prefecture.
- 1945 Returned to Tokyo, still in war.
- 1946 Entered Tokyo prefecture third junior high school (later, Ryōgoku high school).
- 1952 Graduated from Ryōgoku high school. Worked in various occupations.
- 1962 Won the prize in second Hayakawa SF Contest by Shūkaku.
- 1963 Assumed the position of chief of secretariat when the SFWJ was founded. Shūkaku was published in S-F Magazine.
- 1969 Married Hisae (久恵).
- 1970 Short novel Akai Sakaba wo Otozure tamae was published in February issue of S-F Magazine.
- 1971 First long novel Ishi no Ketsumyaku was published.
- 1973 Won the Izumi Kyōka Award for Musubi no Yama Hiroku.
- 1974 Short novel Tansu (箪笥) was published in June issue of Gensō to Kaiki magazine.
- 1975 Won the Naoki Award for short story Amayadori.
- 1978 Mother Fusako (房子) died.
- 1979 Movie Sengoku Jieitai was released.
- 1980 First episode of The World of the Sun was published in magazine Yasei Jidai of Kadokawa Publishing.
- 1984 Moved to Tomakomai, Hokkaidō prefecture.
- 1987 Returned to Tokyo.
- 1988 Won the Nihon SF Taisho Award for Resistance of Misaki Ichirō.
- 1993 Won the Shibata Renzaburo Award for Kakashi Nagaya.
- 1999 Moved to Kanuma city, Tochigi prefecture.
- 2001 Returned to Chōfu, Tokyo, where the family lived.
- 2002 Published Gokumon kubi in Kobunsha bunko.
- 2002-03-04 Died at Shibuya, Tokyo, (68 years), due to pneumonia.

== Awards ==
- 1962 Third Prize in the 2nd Hayakawa SF Contest for Shūkaku (収穫)
- 1972 Seiun Award (long novel) for Ishi no Ketsumyaku (石の血脈)
- 1973 Izumi Kyōka Prize for Literature for Musubi no Yama Hiroku (産霊山秘録)
- 1975 Naoki Prize for Amayadori (雨やどり)
- 1988 Nihon SF Taisho Award for Misaki Ichirō no Teikou (岬一郎の抵抗)
- 1993 Shibata Renzaburō Award (ja) for Kakashi Nagaya (かかし長屋)
- 2002 Special Award of the Nihon Bōken Shōsetsu Kyōkai (JAFA)

== Works in English translation ==
- "Cardboard Box" (ボール箱, Bōrubako)
  - The Best Japanese Science Fiction Stories. Barricade Books. 1997 [Dembner Books: 1989].
  - Speculative Japan. Kurodahan Press. 2007.
- "Tansu" (箪笥; "bureau" or "cabinet") (The Best Japanese Science Fiction Stories. Barricade Books. 1997 [Dembner Books: 1989].)

== Works ==
=== Selected novels ===
- Ishi no Ketsumyaku 石の血脈. Hayakawa shobou. 1971.
- Oyone Heikichi Tokiana no Michiyuki およね平吉時穴道行. Hayakawa shobou. 1971.
- Hikkakatta Haru ひっかかった春. Freberu-kan. 1972.
- Gunka no Hibiki 軍靴の響き. Jitsugyou no Nippon-sha. 1972.
- Musubi no Yama Hiroku 産霊山秘録. Kadokawa Shoten. 1973.
- Ōgon Densetsu 黄金伝説. Shouden-sha. 1973.
- Eiyū Densetsu 英雄伝説. Shouden-sha. 1973.
- Akūkan Yousai 亜空間要塞. Hayakawa shobou. 1974.
- Waga Furusato wa Yomi no Kuni わがふるさとは黄泉の国 [Our Home in the Yomi]. Hayakawa shobou. 1974. (contained Sengoku Jieitai)
  - Sengoku Jieitai 戦国自衛隊 [Warring States Self-Defense Force]. 1975.
- Yōseiden 妖星伝. Kodansha. 1975–1993. [7 volumes]
- Genshi-gai 幻視街. Kodansha. 1977.
- Yami no Joō 闇の女王. Jitsugyo no Nihonsha. 1978.
- Taiyō no Sekai 太陽の世界. Kadokawa Shoten. 1980–1989. [18 volumes (unfinished)]
- Noto Kaii-tan 能登怪異譚. Shueisha. 1988.
- Misaki Ichurō no Teikō 岬一郎の抵抗. Mainichi Shuppan. 1988.
- Hareta Sora 晴れた空. Shueisha. 1991.
- Kakashi Nagaya かかし長屋. Yomiuri Shinbunsha. 1992.
- Nisen-sanjūnen Tōhoku Jichiku 二〇三〇年東北自治区 [Tohoku Autonomous Region in 2030]. Shinchosha. 1992.
- Tasogare Sakaba たそがれ酒場. Chūōkōron-sha. 1994.
- Katsushika Monogatari 葛飾物語. Chūōkōron-sha. 1996.

etc.
