= Yōseiden =

1975–1995 fiction series by Ryō Hanmura

- The cover of the first volume of the series
- Author: Ryō Hanmura
- Language: Japanese
- Genre: Fantasy, science fiction, historical fiction, horror
- Publisher: Kōdansha
- Publication date: 1975–1995
- Publication place: Japan

Yōseiden (妖星伝, Legend of an Enchanted Planet) is a multi-part science fiction/fantasy literary series by Ryō Hanmura. It was published in 7 volumes from 1975–1995. The series is generally regarded as a classic in the world of Japanese science fiction. In SF Magazine, it was voted as one of the top ten Japanese science fiction novels of all time alongside Hanmura's other masterpiece Musubi no Yama Hiroku (産霊山秘録). A manga with the same name, following a similar plot, was drawn by Leiji Matsumoto.

== Overview ==
The narrative concerns the exploits of the Dark Emperor Gido, the alien leader of a demonic anti-Shinto faith known as "Kido". Desiring to conquer the earth, he sends forth several disembodied alien entities to possess human hosts in 17th century Japan.

== Books ==
1. Kidō no maki 鬼道の巻 [Scroll of Spiritualism]. 1975.
2. Gedō no maki 外道の巻 [Scroll of Heresy]. 1975.
3. Shintō no maki 神道の巻 [Scroll of Animism]. 1976.
4. Ōdō no maki 黄道の巻 [Scroll of Ecliptic]. 1977.
5. Tendō no maki 天道の巻 [Scroll of Svarga]. 1979.
6. Nindō no maki 人道の巻 [Scroll of Humanism]. 1980.
7. Madō no maki 魔道の巻 [Scroll of Demonism]. 1993.
