= Ishi no Ketsumyaku =

1971 novel by Ryō Hanmura

- Cover of the 2007 republication
- Author: Ryō Hanmura
- Language: Japanese
- Genre: Science fiction, Horror
- Publisher: Hayakawa shobou
- Publication date: 1971
- Publication place: Japan

Ishi no Ketsumyaku (石の血脈 Blood Ties to a Stone) is a science fiction novel by Ryo Hanmura. It won the third Seiun Award in 1972, and was the first major work to popularize Hanmura in the world of Japanese science fiction literature. Fukushima Masami, the first editor-in-chief of S-F Magazine, included it in '100 Best Science Fiction', when he made the list in 1976.

== Overview ==
The novel rewrites the mythology of vampires and werewolves, positing that such creatures are garbled references to a race of immortality seeking "secret masters" who have existed since ancient times. These "secret masters" are infected with a virus transmitted through sexual intercourse, which instills in them a vampiric craving for blood. The end stage of the disease puts the victim in a chrysalis state, who then awakens after several centuries as a newly formed immortal. The story concerns many dramatic intrigues among the wealthy modern individuals who seek to acquire the infection and ensure protection for themselves during the long chrysalis period.
