= Yukikaze (novel) =

Japanese novel series

- Promotional artwork for the OVA series

戦闘妖精雪風 (Sentō Yōsei Yukikaze)
- Novel series
- Written by: Chōhei Kambayashi
- Published by: Hayakawa Publishing
- English publisher: NA: Viz Media (first 2 novels)
- Original run: February 1, 1984 – present
- Volumes: 5
- Original video animation
- Directed by: Masahiko Ōkura
- Produced by: Kiyoshi Sugiyama; Hiroko Sakurai; Manabu Ishikawa (#2); Tsutomu Kojima (#3–5)
- Written by: Hiroshi Yamaguchi (#1); Yumi Tada (#1); Masahiko Ōkura (#1, 5); Masashi Sogo (#2–5); Ikuto Yamashita (#5); Seiji Kio (#5)
- Music by: Satoshi Mishiba; Dōgen Shiono (#1–4); Clara (#5)
- Studio: Gonzo
- Licensed by: AUS: Madman Entertainment; EU: Beez; NA: Bandai Entertainment
- Released: August 28, 2002 – August 26, 2005
- Runtime: 28–49 minutes
- Episodes: 5

Yukikaze (戦闘妖精雪風, Sentō Yōsei Yukikaze; lit. Battle Fairy Yukikaze) is a Japanese military science fiction novel series, written by Chōhei Kambayashi. First published as a series of short stories, a collected bunkobon volume was released by Hayakawa Publishing in 1984. It was followed by two sequels, released in 1999 and 2009. A five-episode original video animation (OVA) series, produced by Gonzo and Bandai Visual, was released in Japan from August 2002 to August 2005.

The series is notable for its air combat scenes, which were created with the help of the Japan Air Self-Defense Force. The JASDF worked with the Gonzo production team by recording actual sounds of the F-15J Eagle and running test flights at Komatsu Air Base, and having discussions on air combat tactics.

In 1985, Yukikaze received the 16th Seiun Award for Best Japanese Long Work. The OVA series has twice won the Tokyo Anime Award for Original Video Animation in 2003 and 2006.

== Premise ==
Yukikaze occurs in the early 21st century. Thirty-three years before the events of the series, an alien force known as the JAM invade Earth through a dimensional portal that appeared over Antarctica. Without alarming the general public, the United Nations establishes a defense force to oppose the threat and after a series of bloody battles, manages to push the enemy back to the other side of the portal. The UN establishes five bases on the JAM homeworld, a planet named "Fairy", to continue the offensive against the JAM with the Fairy Air Force (FAF) leading the way. The main character, Lt Rei Fukai, pilots the FFR-31MR/D Super Sylph (later the FFR-41MR Mave) fighter B-503, nicknamed "Yukikaze", an advanced armed tactical reconnaissance plane equipped with a near-sentient AI system, and belongs to the FAF's combat intelligence wing the Special Air Force (SAF)'s recon squadron, known as Boomerang Squadron. Over the course of the series, Fukai and the FAF struggles to defeat the JAM, who have perfected the art of human cloning and planted agents all over the FAF.

== Characters ==
Rei Fukai (深井零, Fukai Rei)
Voiced by: Masato Sakai (Japanese); Steve Staley (English)
Rei is a 2nd Lieutenant in the FAF's Special Air Force (SAF) reconnaissance unit. He is the pilot of the B-503 "Yukikaze" fighter. Although depicted as a loner and having a tendency toward social rejection, he is good friends with Jack Bukhar and eventually interacts with other SAF pilots.
Major James "Jack" Bukhar (ジェイムズ・ブッカー, Jeimuzu Bukkā)
Voiced by: Jōji Nakata (Japanese); Dan Woren (English)
The de facto second-in-command of the SAF, Bukhar is Rei's commanding officer. Despite the seniority, he is the only person in the FAF to even befriend Fukai and help him deal with the stress of battle. A prominent theme with the character is his interest in boomerangs and their aerodynamic characteristics.
Lydia Cooley (リディア・クーリィ, Ridia Kūrī)
Voiced by: Yōko Asagami (Japanese); Carol Stanzione (English)
A former investment banker who signed up with the FAF during the early days of the JAM war, Cooley is a skilled player in the FAF's power struggles. She is the SAF's commander with the rank of brigadier-general.
Edith Foss (エディス・フォス, Edisu Fosu)
Voiced by: Miho Yamada (Japanese); Kari Wahlgren (English)
A psychiatrist by trade, Foss is attached to the FAF and holds the rank of captain. In the series, Foss is responsible for profiling Yukikaze and diagnosing Rei Fukai after he lapsed into a quasi-comatose state when his first aircraft is destroyed. Cooley later orders her to "profile" the JAM as a single entity. Also, she's the niece of brigadier-general Rydia Cooley.
Richard Burgadish (リチャード・バーガディシュ, Richādo Bāgadishu)
Voiced by: Takuya Kirimoto (Japanese); Eddie Frierson (English)
A second lieutenant of the FAF, Burgadish is assigned as the Yukikaze's flight officer following the death of Lieutenant Norman Hughes.
Lynn Jackson (リン・ジャクスン, Rin Jakuson)
Voiced by: Masako Ikeda (Japanese); Barbara Goodson (English)
One of the few civilian characters in the series, Jackson is the author of The Invader, a chronicle of the FAF's struggle against the JAM. She went to Antarctica to research the book several times.
Karl Gunow (カール・グノー, Kāru Gunō)
Voiced by: Hōchū Ōtsuka (Japanese); Doug Stone (English)
Andy Lander (アンディ・ランダー, Andi Randā)
An American free columnist who travels to the FAF base on Fairy.
Tomahawk "Tom" John (トマホーク（トム）・ジョン, Tomahōku (Tomu) Jon)
Voiced by: Kazuki Yao (Japanese); Derek Stephen Prince (English)
A Native American FAF captain. Was part of the development team that built Yukikaze's AI. Has a plutonium battery-powered artificial heart.
Hugh O'Donnell (ヒュー・オドンネル, Hyū Odonneru)
An FAF captain assigned to the experimental fighter Fern II.
Mamoru Amada (天田守, Amada Mamoru)
Hajime Yagashira (矢頭元, Yagashira Hajime)
Akira Katsuragi (桂城彰, Katsuragi Akira)
Ansel Rombert (アンセル・ロンバート, Anseru Ronbāto)
Voiced by: Takaya Hashi (Japanese); Dave Mallow (English)
Rombert is a colonel who leads the FAF Intelligence Division. He is determined to find out more about the JAM.
Hiroshi Yazawa (ヒロシ・ヤザワ)
Voiced by: Katsumi Chō (Japanese); Grant Albrecht (English)
An FAF major stationed at the TAB-14 frontline base. Yazawa is actually a Jam taking a human form who attempts to extract the security code of Yukikaze from a captured Rei and Burgadish.
Marnie (マーニィ, Mānī)
Voiced by: Atsuko Tanaka (Japanese); Philece Sampler (English)
A nurse from the TAB-14 base. Like Yazawa, Marnie is a JAM taking a human form.
Gavin Mail (ギャビン・メイル, Gyabin Meiru)
Jonathan Lancome (ジョナサン・ランコム, Jonasan Rankomu)

== Media ==
=== Novel ===
Yukikaze, written by Chōhei Kanbayashi, was published a series of short stories in S-F Magazine from 1979 to 1983, and was later collected by Hayakawa Publishing in a bunkobon volume on February 1, 1984. It has been followed by four sequels: Good Luck, Yukikaze (グッドラック 戦闘妖精・雪風, Guddo Rakku Sentō Yōsei Yukikaze), released on May 1, 1999; Unbroken Arrow, Yukikaze (アンブロークン アロー 戦闘妖精・雪風, Anburōkun Arō Sentō Yōsei Yukikaze), released on July 25, 2009; and Aggressors, Yukikaze (アグレッサーズ 戦闘妖精・雪風, Aguressāzu Sentō Yōsei Yukikaze), released on April 20, 2022. The fifth novel, Insights, Yukikaze (インサイト 戦闘妖精・雪風, Insaitou Sentō Yōsei Yukikaze) released on February 19, 2025.

Viz Media licensed the first two novels for English release in North America. Yukikaze was released on January 19, 2010. Good Luck, Yukikaze was released on July 19, 2011.

=== Original video animation ===
Produced by Gonzo, Victor Entertainment and Bandai Visual to commemorate Bandai Visual's 20th anniversary. The five episode series was originally released directly to DVD as an original video animation. It was later aired in Japan on the anime television network Animax, which also aired the series on its English language networks across Southeast Asia and other networks worldwide. The series' ending theme is "RTB" by Monsieur Kamayatsu.

Yukikaze was licensed for an English language release in North America by Bandai Entertainment, and in Australia and New Zealand by Madman Entertainment. In 2018, the series and its spinoff Fighting Fantasy Girl Rescue Me: Mave-chan were streamed online by Tubi.

=== Episode listing ===
No.	Title	Original release date
1	"Operation 1"	August 25, 2002
The human race has beaten an invasion by an alien race called the JAM back to its home planet Fairy. Fairy Air Force, the UN-mandated military organization tasked with neutralizing and eventually eliminating the alien threat, assigns an armed strategic reconnaissance aircraft codenamed "Yukikaze" and equipped with an AI to Lt. Rei Fukai of the subordinate Special Air Force with the intention to record data on JAM movements and battlefield tactics. One day, however, an encounter with the "Grey Sylph" (a JAM duplicate of the Yukikaze) lands him in hot water with his superiors. During another patrol, Fukai is captured by JAM clones wanting to study the plane. He kills one of his captors and escapes with the plane from an alien entity disguised as a FAF forward airbase but ends up being pursued and shot down by the "Grey Sylph". As the "Grey Sylph" attempts to finish off Fukai's aircraft, the Yukikaze AI hijacks an FRX-99, a prototype UCAV that was undergoing operational tests at that time, and uses it to destroy the "Grey Sylph". The AI uploads its files to the FRX-99, ejects Fukai, and obliterates Yukikaze's wreckage.
2	"Operation 2"	February 25, 2003
The ordeals from the previous mission leaves Rei Fukai in a catatonic state, which proves short-lived when he responds to the Yukikaze AI, now transferred into the prototype FRX-00 Mave (a crewed version of the FRX-99 that has been equipped with a countermeasure system to detect JAM computer infiltrations), as the latter strafes a FAF tactical airfield that it identifies as a JAM entity during a test flight. This and several suspected acts of sabotage made on other FAF aircraft raise alarms to some FAF officials, including Brigadier General Cooley, on possible JAM infiltrations. She assigns Rei to the prototype Mave under the observations of Edith Foss, who will soon have an opportunity to profile both Rei and Yukikaze under combat situations.
3	"Operation 3"	August 22, 2003
Rei and another Fairy Air Force crewmember investigate a Banshee flying aircraft carrier that opened fire on friendly forces prior. Further inspection on the seemingly-deserted carrier reveals that it is being used by JAM to create human clones. When transmission of their finding triggers the FAF's computerized command and control system into launching a SRBM to destroy the Banshee, Rei escapes, but his companion, upon discovery that he himself is a JAM clone, elects to stay behind onboard the doomed air fortress.
4	"Operation 4"	April 23, 2004
Rei and Yukikaze fly back to Earth to test the plane's new engines but JAM forces follow them out of the portal. An Earth-borne Japanese Navy aircraft carrier battlegroup, mistaking the JAM attackers for unauthorized FAF aircraft, is taken by surprise and quickly fall into disarray. The Admiral56, the Japanese flagship, is only saved from a final ramming attempt by the aliens by Rei's timely intervention. The Yukikaze is forced to land on the Admiral56 for refueling, and it is right there Rei would find out how ignorant Earth has become to the war raging on Fairy.
5	"Operation 5"	August 26, 2005
Concluding that planet Fairy is in fact the collective of JAM itself and that JAM infiltrators are on the eve of starting a mutiny, the FAF devises a plan to lure JAM infiltrators into a trap while pulling the rest of their forces out of Fairy. In response, JAM arrays its entire fighting force between the FAF and their portal of escape and hijacks some of the FAF's UCAVs, causing chaos within FAF formations. Intent on settling scores with JAM, who have repeatedly tried to hack the Yukikaze AI, Rei Fukai and the AI launch in one final sortie to escort nuclear weapons into the heart of the JAM collective, giving the FAF the opening they need to escape and seemingly sacrificing themselves in the process.

=== Sentō Yōsei Shojo Tasukete! Mave-chan ===
Mave-chan (戦闘妖精少女 たすけて！メイヴちゃん, Sentō Yōsei Shoujo Tasukete! Mave-chan; lit. Fighting Fairy Girl: Rescue Me, Mave-chan!) is a comedic, parody spin-off of the serious military science-fiction anime and novel. It was aired on Feb 24, 2005, and was produced by Bandai and Studio Fantasia. While the original Yukikaze is an intense, philosophical, and visually striking drama about human and AI pilots fighting the JAM (an alien force) in highly realistic fighter jets, Mave-chan flips the entire concept on its head. The spin-off takes a meta-comedy approach as it anthropomorphizes the advanced fighter jets from the original series, like the FFR-41MR Mave and the Super Sylph, and turns them into cute, magical fairy girls. The plot features a shy high school anime fanboy named Rei Sugiyama (a direct parody name pointing to the original's brooding protagonist, Lt. Rei Fukai) goes to a convention and gets sucked into an alternate dimension born from the collective desires of anime geeks. There, he has to help the personified jet-girls defend their world against the JAM before the convention ends and they fade from memory.

== Reception ==
Yukikaze won the 16th Seiun Award for Best Japanese Long Work. The OVA series won the Tokyo Anime Award for Original Video Animation in both 2003 and 2006.
