= Izumi Kyōka Prize for Literature =

Japanese literary award

- 泉鏡花文学賞 (Izumi Kyōka Bungaku Shō)
- Date: 1973
- Country: Japan
- Presented by: City of Kanazawa, Japan
- Reward: ¥1,000,000
- First award: 1973; 53 years ago
- Website: www.city.kanazawa.ishikawa.jp/bungaku/

Izumi Kyōka Prize for Literature (泉鏡花文学賞, Izumi Kyōka Bungaku Shō) is a prize for literature in Japan named for prewar novelist Kyōka Izumi, established in 1973 to commemorate the 100th year since his birth. It is organized by the city of Kanazawa in Ishikawa Prefecture, where Izumi was born. While the annual award traditionally goes to a single recipient, there have been exceptions.

== List of Prize-winning works ==
The city of Kanazawa maintains a list of current and past winning works.

=== 1st to 10th ===
Number (Year)	Winner	Winning Work
1st (1973)	Ryō Hanmura	Musubi no Yama Hiroku (産霊山秘録)
1st (1973)	Toshio Moriuchi	Tobu Kage (翔ぶ影)
2nd (1974)	Hideo Nakai (JA)	Akumu no Karuta (悪夢の骨牌)
3rd (1975)	Mori Mari	Amai Mitsu no Heya (甘い蜜の部屋)
4th (1976)	Takako Takahashi	Yūwakusha (誘惑者)
5th (1977)	Takehiro Irokawa	Ayashii Raikyakubo (怪しい来客簿)
5th (1977)	Yūko Tsushima	Kusa no Fushido (草の臥所)
6th (1978)	Jūzou Kara (JA)	Hitode, Kappa (海星・河童（ひとで・かっぱ）)
7th (1979)	Taku Mayumura	Shōmetsu no Kōrin (消滅の光輪)
7th (1979)	Mieko Kanai	Platon-teki Ren'ai (プラトン的恋愛, Puraton-teki Ren'ai)
8th (1980)	Kunio Shimizu	Waga Tamashii wa Kagayaku Mizu Nari (わが魂は輝く水なり)
8th (1980)	Makiko Mori (JA)	Yuki Onna (雪女)
9th (1981)	Tatsuhiko Shibusawa	Karakusa Monogatari (唐草物語)
9th (1981)	Yasutaka Tsutsui	Kyojin-tachi (虚人たち)
10th (1982)	Keizo Hino	Hōyō (抱擁)

=== 11th to 20th ===
Number (Year)	Winner	Winning Work
11th (1983)	Kazuko Saegusa (JA)	Onidomo no Yoru wa Fukai (鬼どもの夜は深い)
11th (1983)	Haku Kohiyama (JA)	Hikaru Onna (光る女)
12th (1984)	Akae Baku	Kaikyō (海峡)
12th (1984)	Akae Baku	Yakumo ga Koroshita (八雲が殺した)
13th (1985)	Shunzō Miyawaki (JA)	Satsui no Fūkei (殺意の風景)
14th (1986)	Mizuko Masuda	Single Seru (シングル・セル, Shinguru Seru)
15th (1987)	Yumiko Kurahashi	Amanon koku ōkanki (アマノン国往還記)
15th (1987)	Hideo Asaine (JA)	Shūji no Hōrō (シュージの放浪)
16th (1988)	Tsumao Awasaka (JA)	Oriduru (折鶴)
16th (1988)	Banana Yoshimoto	Mūnraito Shadō (Moonlight Shadow, ムーンライト・シャドウ)
17th (1989)	Taka Isawa (JA)	Nowaki Sakaba (野分酒場)
17th (1989)	Aiko Kitahara (JA)	Fukagawa Mio-dōri Kidobangoya (深川澪通り木戸番小屋)
18th (1990)	Jōkichi Hikage (JA)	Doro Kisha (泥汽車)
19th (1991)	Enjeru Ui or Angel Ui (JA)	Odorō, Maya (踊ろう・マヤ)
20th (1992)	Megumu Sagisawa	Kakeru Shōnen (駆ける少年)
20th (1992)	Masahiko Shimada	Higan Sensei (彼岸先生)

=== 21st to 30th ===
Number (Year)	Winner	Winning Work
21st (1993)	Michiko Yamamoto	Mofuku no Ko (喪服の子)
22nd (1994)	(no winning works)	
23rd (1995)	Akira Tsuji (JA)	Yume no Hōi (夢の方位)
24th (1996)	Miri Yū	Full House (フルハウス Furu hausu)
24th (1996)	Eimi Yamada	Animal logic (アニマル・ ロジック, Animaru rojikku)
25th (1997)	Tomomi Muramatsu	Kamakura no Obasan (鎌倉のおばさん)
25th (1997)	Natsuhiko Kyōgoku	Warau Iemon (嗤う伊右衛門)
26th (1998)	Seiko Tanabe	Dōton-bori no ame ni wakarete irai nari - Senryū sakka Kishimoto Suifu to sono jidai (道頓堀の雨に別れて以来なり──川柳作家・岸本水府とその時代)
27th (1999)	Tomoko Yoshida	Hako no Otto (箱の夫)
27th (1999)	Suehiro Tanemura	Tanemura Suehiro no Neo rabirintosu "Gensō no Erosu" and other work(s) (種村季弘のネオ・ラビリントス「幻想のエロス」 Tanemura Suehiro no Neo-Labyrinthos "Gensō no Eros") and other work(s)
28th (2000)	Yōko Tawada	Hinagiku no Ocha no Baai (ヒナギクのお茶の場合)
29th (2001)	Teruhiko Kuze (JA)	Shōshōkan Nichiroku (蕭々館日録)
29th (2001)	Shōno Yoriko	Yūkai Morimusume? Ibun (幽界森娘異聞)
30th (2002)	Akiyuki Nosaka	"Bundan" oyobi sore ni itaru bungyō (「文壇」およびそれに至る文業)

=== 31st to 40th ===
Number (Year)	Winner	Winning Work
31st (2003)	Saiichi Maruya	Kagayaku Hi no Miya (輝く日の宮)
31st (2003)	Natsuo Kirino	Grotesque (グロテスク, Gurotesuku)
32nd (2004)	Yōko Ogawa	Burafuman no Maisō (ブラフマンの埋葬)
33rd (2005)	Michiko Ryō (JA)	Rakuen no Tori - Karukatta Gensōkyoku (楽園の鳥–カルカッタ幻想曲–)
34th (2006)	Kōzaburō Arashiyama	Akutō Bashō (悪党芭蕉)
35th (2007)	Wahei Tatematsu	Dōgen Zenji (道元禅師)
35th (2007)	Fujio Ōtaka (N/A)	Kyōka Koiuta (鏡花恋唄) - (Remark: special award)
36th (2008)	Keishi Nagi (JA)	Kusa Suberi (草すべり) and other short stories
36th (2008)	Tadanori Yokoo	Buruu Rando (Blue land ??) (ぶるうらんど)
37th (2009)	Akane Chihaya	Iogami (魚神)
38th (2010)	Masahiro Shinoda	Kawaramono no susume, shie to shura no kioku (河原者ノススメ―死穢と修羅の記憶)
39th (2011)	Jakuchō Setouchi	Fūkei (風景)
39th (2011)	Baku Yumemakura	Ōedo Chōkakuden (大江戸釣客伝)
40th (2012)	Mitsuyo Kakuta	Kanata no Ko (かなたの子)

=== 41st to 50th ===
Number (Year)	Winner	Winning Work
41st (2013)	Ken’ichirō Isozaki (JA)	Ōko Raikon (往古来今)
42nd (2014)	Kyōko Nakajima	Tsuma ga Shiitake datta Koro (妻が椎茸だったころ)
42nd (2014)	Masayo Koike (JA)	Tamamono (たまもの)
43rd (2015)	Mayumi Nagano (JA)	Meido ari (冥途あり)
43rd (2015)	Katsuyuki Shinohara (JA)	Koppū (骨風)
44th (2016)	Hiromi Kawakami	Ōkina tori ni sarawarenai yō (大きな鳥にさらわれないよう)
45th (2017)	Rieko Matsuura	Saiai no kodomo (最愛の子ども)
46th (2018)	Yūko Yamao (JA)	Tobu Kujaku (飛ぶ孔雀)
47th (2019)	Shin'ya Tanaka (JA)	Hiyoko Taiyō (ひよこ太陽)
48th (2020)	Nobuko Takagi	Shōsetsu Ise Monogatari Narihira (小説伊勢物語業平)
49th (2021)	Kiyoko Murata	Ane no Shima (姉の島)
50th (2022)	Fumiko Ōhama (JA)	Hidamari no Hate (陽だまりの果て)

=== 51st to 60th ===
Number (Year)	Winner	Winning Work
51st (2023)	Kaoru Kitamura	Mizu, Hon no Shōsetsu (水 本の小説)
51st (2023)	Aki Asahina (JA)	Anata no Moeru Hidarite de (あなたの燃える左手で)
52nd (2024)	Maha Harada	板上に咲く MUNAKATA: Beyond Van Gogh

== See also ==
- List of literary awards
