= Mariko Ōhara =

Japanese science fiction writer (born 1959)

- Born: March 20, 1959 (age 67); Osaka, Japan
- Education: University of the Sacred Heart
- Spouse: Keigo Misaki (m. 1987)
- Writing career
- Language: Japanese
- Notable awards: 1991 Seiun Award for Haiburiddo Chairudo; 1980 Nihon SF Taisho Award for Sensō-wo Enjita Kamigamitachi

Mariko Ōhara (大原まり子, Ōhara Mariko; born March 20, 1959 in Osaka, Japan) is a Japanese science fiction writer. She won the 6th Hayakawa SF Contest in 1980, when she was still a student. Later she published various SF works and became the 10th president of the Science Fiction and Fantasy Writers of Japan. Ōhara is the Winner of the Nihon SF Taisho Award in 1994.

== Biography ==
Ōhara was born in Osaka. She wrote Kirk/Spock fan fiction in her teens. She graduated in psychology from the University of the Sacred Heart (Japan) (聖心女子大学).

Ōhara won the 6th Hayakawa SF Contest for her short story "Hitori de Aruite itta Neko (A Cat who Walked along Alone)" in 1980. Next year, in 1981, she graduated from the University and started publishing her stories in the S-F Magazine. She belongs to the 3rd generation of the Japanese SF writers.

In 1991, her "Haiburiddo Chairudo, Hybrid Child" (ハイブリッド・チャイルド won the Seiun Award for Japanese novel. Then, in 1995 she won the 15th Nihon SF Taisho Award for "Sensō-wo Enjita Kamigamitachi, Gods who Bandied War" (戦争を演じた神々たち).

She was a science fiction reviewer for Asahi Shimbun from April 1998 to March 2002, and she was on the jury for the Nihon SF Taisho Awards from 1997 to 1999. She was also the 10th president of the Science Fiction and Fantasy Writers of Japan from September 1999 to September 2001.

Ōhara is a member of the Science Fiction and Fantasy Writers of Japan, of the Japanese Writers' Association (JA), and, of the Nihon Pen Club (JA).

== Awards ==
- 1980: 6th Hayakawa SF Contest Award for Hitori de Aruite itta Neko
- 1991: 22nd Seiun Award (Japanese long novel) for Hybrid Child
- 1994: 15th Nihon SF Taisho Award for Sensō wo Enjita Kamigami-tachi
- 1998: 19th Seiun Award (Japanese short novel) for Independence Day in Ōsaka

== Selected works ==
=== Novels ===
- Hitori de Aruite itta Neko (一人で歩いていった猫), 1982, Hayakawa Publishing
- Kikaishin Asura (機械神アスラ), 1983, Hayakawa Publishing
- Ginga Network de Uta wo Utatta Kujira (銀河ネットワークで歌を歌ったクジラ), 1984, Hayakwa Publishing
- Miika wa Miika, Trouble Maker (ミーカはミーカ, トラブル・メーカー), 1985, Shueisha
- Miraishi-tachi (未来視たち), 1986, Hayakawa Publishing
- Ishi no Koku City (石の刻シティ), 1986, Tokuma Shoten
- Mental Female (メンタル・フィメール), 1988, Hayakawa Publishing
- Hybrid Child (ハイブリッド・チャイルド, Haiburiddo Chairudo), 1990, Hayakawa Publishing
- Kyōfu no Katachi (恐怖のカタチ), 1993, Asahi Sonorama
- Sensō wo Enjita Kamigami-tachi (戦争を演じた神々たち), 1994, Aspect
- Sensō wo Enjita Kamigami-tachi II (戦争を演じた神々たち II), 1997, Askie Aspect
- Archaic States (アルカイック・ステイツ), 1997, Hayakawa Publishing
- Mitsumeru Onna (みつめる女), 1999, Kousaidou

== Works in English translation ==
- "The Mental Female" (The Review of Contemporary Fiction, Summer 2002)
- "Girl" (Speculative Japan, Kurodahan Press, 2007)
- "The Whale that Sang on the Milky Way Network" (Speculative Japan 2, Kurodahan Press, 2011)
- Hybrid Child (trans. Jodie Beck, University of Minnesota Press, 2018)

== Video game works ==
Mariko Ōhara did the scenario for Quintet's video game Illusion of Gaia, along with Masaya Hashimoto and Tomoyoshi Miyazaki.

== Notes and references ==
- The Encyclopedia of Science Fiction page 641
