= Mizuko =

- Gender: Female

Origin
- Origin: Japanese
- Meaning: Different meanings depending on the kanji used

Mizuko (written: 瑞子 or みず子) is a feminine Japanese given name. Notable people with then name include:

- Mizuko Ito (伊藤 瑞子; born 1968), Japanese cultural anthropologist
- Mizuko Masuda (増田 みず子; born 1948), Japanese writer
- Mizuko Nanbu (南部 瑞子; 1908–1980), Director of the Girl Scouts of Japan
- Takahashi Mizuko (高橋 瑞子; 1852–1927), Japanese physician

The name is not generally written with the kanji 水子, meaning water child, due to the combination also meaning a stillborn baby.

== See also ==
- Mizuko kuyō, a Japanese ceremony
