= Norio Nakai =

Japanese science fiction writer

Norio Nakai (中井 紀夫, Nakai Norio; 1952-) is a Japanese science fiction and fantasy writer.

== Biography ==
Nakai was born on 20 November, 1952. His birth place is not public. He graduated from the department of humanities, Musashi University. After working as a piano player at night club in Kabukicho, Shinjuku, he joined the magazine SF no Hon (ＳＦの本, Book of SF), into which he wrote SF critic and contributed. Then, his work Ryū no Oriru Yo (竜の降りる夜) was recognized as a noticeable entry in the Hayakawa SF Contest in 1985. Next year, 1986, he debuted in the S-F Magazine by his short story Wasure-enu Hito (忘れえぬ人).

Nakai contributed short stories into Hayakawa S-F Magazine. He published the seven books of western-like action stories series, Nō-nashi Wani (能無しワニ, Wani, the incapable) in Hayakawa science fiction bunko in 1987 to 1989. The serial stories in future western-like planet, where a guy, called Wani (Crocodile), who has no supernatural power, while every people have some power, plays an action-packed role.

Nakai wrote and published science fiction stories in various themes. In Hyōchaku-shin Toshi in 1988, the unidentified spirit washed up in a city and its electro-brain machine appear. Kairei-den in 1990 tells the tale which depicts urban-style love romance of the sea-creatures clan. There is also the tale of a boy who has been destructing city unconsciously by his large super-natunal power evoking earthquakes in Mosaic, 2001, and so.

Nakai also wrote and published strange feeling fantasy stories. He won the Seiun Award for his short fantasy novel Yama no Ue no Kōkyōgaku (Mountaintop Symphony). In this story, the special symphony work which takes 10 thousand years to perform appears. The story tells daily life of the orchestra which has been playing this symphony.

He wrote scenarios for TV drama "Yo-nimo Kimyōna Monogatari" (ja:世にも奇妙な物語) and novelizations of games.

== Works ==
=== Science fiction ===
- Nō-nashi Wani series (能無しワニ), 1987-1989, Hayakawa Publishing [7 volumes]
1. Minami kara kita Kenjū-tsukai 南から来た拳銃使い. 1987
2. Uragiri Toride no Kenjū Burai 裏切り砦の拳銃無頼. 1987
3. Koi no Kenjū Mushuku 恋の拳銃無宿. 1987
4. Wani yo Jū o Tore ワニよ銃を取れ. 1988
5. Wani yo Jū o Tore 2 続ワニよ銃を取れ. 1988
6. Kōya no Tokage Riders 荒野のトカゲ・ライダーズ. 1989
7. Haruka naru Dai-Keikoku 遥かなる大渓谷. 1989
- Hyouchaku-shin Toshi 漂着神都市, 1988, Tokuma Shoten
- Kairei-den 海霊伝, 1990, Tokuma Shoten
- Ikyō no Mon 遺響の門, 2000, Tokuma Shoten
- Mosaic モザイク, 2001, Tokuma Shoten

=== Fantasy ===
- Yama no Ue no Kōkyōgaku 山の上の交響楽, 1989, Hayakawa Publishing
- Tarukas Den タルカス伝, 1990-1993, Hayakawa Publishing [Part I, 5 volumes, unfinished]
1. Imada Umarenu Mono no Densetsu いまだ生まれぬものの伝説. 1990
2. Honoo no Umi yori Umareshi Mono 炎の海より生まれしもの. 1991
3. Ken o Torite, Honoo o Yobe 剣をとりて炎をよべ. 1992
4. HI no Yama yo, Mezame yo 火の山よ目覚めよ. 1993
5. Hi no Yama no Kanata ni 火の山の彼方に. 1993
- Brief, Shirts, Fukushin-zuke ブリーフ、シャツ、福神漬, 1991, Nami Shobou
- Shinigami no iru Machikado 死神のいる街角, 1995, Shuppan Geijutsu-sha

== Works in English translation ==
- "Mountaintop Symphony" (山の上の交響楽, Yama no Ue no Kōkyō-gaku) (Speculative Japan 2, Kurodahan Press, 2011)
