= Musubi no Yama Hiroku =

1973 novel by Ryō Hanmura

- Cover of the 1999 republication of the novel
- Author: Ryō Hanmura
- Language: Japanese
- Genre: Fantasy, science fiction
- Publisher: Kadokawa Shoten
- Publication date: 1973
- Publication place: Japan

Musubi no Yama Hiroku (産霊山秘録 The Secret History of Mt. Musubi) is an epic historical fantasy novel by Ryō Hanmura. It is a multi-generational saga reinterpreting 400 years of Japan's history through the perspective of a secretive family with mystical capabilities.

The novel is widely considered one of the masterpieces of Japanese fantasy literature. It won the first Izumi Kyōka Prize for Literature in 1973. In a 2006 issue of S-F Magazine, one of Japan's most prominent science fiction publications, it was voted as one of the "Top Ten Japanese Science Fiction Novels of All Time".

== Overview ==
The plot revolves around the Hi Family, whose lineage stretches back into antiquity. Each member of the family possesses supernatural psychic powers fueled by the three magical treasures called Mikagami, Yoritama, and Ibuki. All throughout history, the Hi Family have been subtly manipulating Japan's greatest historical events from behind the scenes, leading the country to its modern formation.

The narrative opens during Oda Nobunaga's Siege of Mount Hiei. It then proceeds through the Battle of Sekigahara to the end of the Tokugawa Shogunate, and all the way to the end of the Pacific War.
