= Tomoko Yoshida =

Japanese writer

- Born: Tomoko Kira; February 6, 1934 (age 92)
- Occupation: writer

Tomoko Yoshida (吉田 知子, real name Tomoko Kira 吉良 知子; Hamamatsu, Shizuoka Prefecture February 6, 1934) is a Japanese writer. She has won the Akutagawa Prize, the Izumi Kyōka Prize for Literature, the Women's Literature Prize, and the Kawabata Yasunari Literature Prize.

== Early life and education ==
Yoshida grew up in Shinkyō (currently Changchun), the capital of Manchukuo, in Manchuria. Her father was a professional soldier who was taken to the USSR by Soviet troops at the close of World War II in 1945. Between 1945 and 1947, Yoshida was detained on the island of Karafuto (Sakhalin). Her mother brought her back to Japan, where Yoshida studied economics at Nagoya Municipal Junior Two-Year College for Women. She graduated in 1954 and worked as a high school teacher in Hamamatsu until 1960. In 1957, she married teacher and writer Kira Nin'ichi.

== Awards ==
- 1970 63rd Akutagawa Prize (1970上), Mumyōjōya (無明長夜)
- 1985 23rd Women's Literature Prize, Manshū wa shiranai (満洲は知らない)
- 1992 19th Kawabata Yasunari Literature Prize, Osonae (お供え)
- 1998 27th Izumi Kyōka Prize for Literature, Hako no tsuma (箱の夫)

== Works (selection) ==
- 1970 Mumyōjōya (無明長夜)
- 1971 Iki mono tachi (生きものたち)
- 1971 Yoshida Tomoko sakuhin sen (吉田知子作品選)
- 1974 Neko no me, onna no me (猫の目、女の目)
- 1979 Inu no kōfuku (犬の幸福)
- 1980 Chichi no haka (父の墓)
- 1981 Watashi no ai no monogatari (わたしの恋の物語)
- 1985 Manshū wa shiranai (満洲は知らない)
- 1985 Kamo (鴨)
- 1993 Osonae (お供え)
- 1996 Sennen ōrai (千年往来)
- 1998 Hako no tsuma (箱の夫)
- 2003 Nihon nanmin (日本難民)
