= Psychic School Wars =

1973 novel by Taku Mayumura

- 1977 paperback edition cover

ねらわれた学園
- Genre: Romance, Science fiction
- Novel
- Written by: Taku Mayumura
- Published by: Kodansha
- Published: 1973
- Manga
- Written by: Taku Mayumura
- Illustrated by: Tatsuru Ishikawa
- Published by: Kadokawa Shoten
- Magazine: Newtype Ace
- Original run: September 2012 – March 2013
- Volumes: 2
- Anime film
- Directed by: Ryosuke Nakamura
- Produced by: Akiko Yodo; Fumi Teranishi; Hirofumi Kosuga; Keiichi Sotomura; Satoshi Hirayama
- Written by: Ryosuke Nakamura; Yuko Naito
- Music by: Shusei Murai
- Studio: Sunrise
- Licensed by: AUS: Madman Entertainment; NA: Funimation; UK: Anime Limited
- Released: October 2012 (Scotland Loves Animation); 10 November 2012 (Japan)
- Runtime: 110 minutes

Nerawareta Gakuen (ねらわれた学園, Psychic School Wars; alternately translated as The Targeted School, School in the Crosshairs, and The Messiah from the Future) is a 1973 Japanese science fiction novel written by Taku Mayumura. It has been adapted into four television dramas, respectively released in 1977, 1982, 1987, and 1997. Two live-action film adaptations were released in 1981 and 1997, the former of which was directed by Nobuhiko Obayashi and starred Hiroko Yakushimaru. In 2012, an anime film adaptation directed by Ryosuke Nakamura was produced by Sunrise and received comparisons to the works of Makoto Shinkai.

== Characters ==
=== Main characters ===
Kenji Seki (関 ケンジ, Seki Kenji)
Voiced by: Yutaro Honjo, Takuto Yoshinaga (young) (Japanese), Graham Halstead, Amy Palant (young) (English)
Kenji is a seemingly average boy who lives with his grandfather and baby sister. His constant tardiness suggests he is lazy and his habits suggest he is absent minded, but his room is littered with inventions and construction plans, which indicates his appearance belies his intelligence. He and Natsuki have lived as neighbors since they were young children and are good friends despite their frequent fighting and incessant teasing. Kenji has an unexplained crush on Kahori Harukawa, which Natsuki exploits through teasing. Though Kenji is generally straightforward, he has difficulty putting his emotions into words, which makes it difficult for him to convey his feelings to Kahori and understand Natsuki's jealousy. Unknown to even him, Kenji is a powerful psychic whose powers were sealed by his grandfather.
Natsuki Suzuura (涼浦 ナツキ, Suzuura Natsuki)
Voiced by: Mayu Watanabe, Mai Hodo (young) (Japanese); Cassandra Lee Morris (English)
Natsuki is an athletic girl who is devoted to running track. Her vivacious nature is demonstrated through her gymnastic movements. She and Kenji have lived next to one another since they were young children and are good friends. Natsuki has held a one-sided love for Kenji and is often confused by her own feelings. On the one hand, she wishes to support Kenji, but on the other, she wishes her feelings would reach him. As a result, she often says and does things to Kenji she does not mean. At some point, Kenji was in a life threatening coma and she traded her psychic powers for his safe recovery, which leaves her powerless.
Kahori Harukawa (春川 カホリ, Harukawa Kahori)
Voiced by: Kana Hanazawa (Japanese); Alyson Leigh Rosenfeld (English)
Kahori is an outwardly perfect girl. She is dedicated to practicing the piano and surfs because it reminds her of her deceased father. She falls in love with Ryōichi from the moment she lays eyes on him and after listening to Ryōichi play Clair de Lune wants to become closer to him. Despite her good relationship with Kenji, she is unaware that he has a crush on her. She is friends with Natsuki, who frequently asks if she likes anyone. Kahori lacks psychic powers.
Ryoichi Kyogoku (京極 亮一, Kyōgoku Ryōichi)
Voiced by: Daisuke Ono (Japanese); Daniel J. Edwards (English)
Ryōichi is an ostensible transfer student who actually is a time traveler from a future where humanity has abandoned Earth to live on the moon. Ryōichi is calm, collected, and pragmatic. He has ample charisma and is well-liked by the student body following his transfer. He is taken by the beauty of the Earth and finds it easy to empathize with the people living there. He views Kenji as both a friend and an enemy with which he will eventually fight. As time progresses he falls in love with Kahori. He possesses the ability to awaken individuals psychic powers.

=== Others ===
Yuriko Yamagiwa (山際 ゆりこ, Yamagiwa Yuriko)
Voiced by: Haruka Tomatsu (Japanese); Erica Schroeder (English)
Kyogoku's familiar (京極の使い魔, Kyōgoku no tsukaima)
Voiced by: Hiroaki Hirata (Japanese); Scott Rayow (English)
Yu Jinno (神野 ゆう, Jinno Yū)
Voiced by: Ryōhei Kimura (Japanese); Kevin T. Collins (English)
