= Toki no Tabibito: Time Stranger =

1986 single by Mariya Takeuchi

- Toki no Tabibito: Time Stranger DVD cover

時空の旅人 -Time Stranger-
- Anime film
- Directed by: Mori Masaki
- Produced by: Rintaro; Masao Maruyama; Yasuteru Iwase
- Written by: Atsushi Yamatoya; Mori Masaki; Yoshio Takeuchi
- Music by: Ryūichi Kuniyoshi
- Studio: Madhouse
- Released: December 20, 1986
- Runtime: 91 minutes
- Video game
- Publisher: Kemco
- Genre: Adventure
- Platform: Family Computer
- Released: JP: December 26, 1986

Toki no Tabibito: Time Stranger (時空の旅人 -Time Stranger-) is a 1986 Japanese animated science fiction film based on the novel by Taku Mayumura. Produced by Madhouse Studios and directed and co-written by Mori Masaki, the film was released in Japan on December 20, 1986, on Kadokawa Shoten and Toho. The character designs were by Moto Hagio.

The film was adapted into a Family Computer game by Kemco and was released on December 26, 1986.
