= 1,778 Stories of Me and My Wife =

- Film poster advertising this film in Japan
- Directed by: Mamoru Hoshi
- Written by: Ritsuko Hanzawa
- Screenplay by: Noriko Hanzawa
- Story by: Taku Mayumura
- Starring: Tsuyoshi Kusanagi, Yūko Takeuchi
- Music by: Yuusuke Honma
- Distributed by: Toho
- Release date: 15 January 2011 (Japan)
- Running time: 139 minutes
- Country: Japan
- Language: Japanese

1,778 Stories of Me and My Wife (僕と妻の1778の物語, Boku to tsuma no 1778 no monogatari) is a 2011 Japanese film based on the true story of the science fiction writer Taku Mayumura. It was directed by Mamoru Hoshi, and stars actor Tsuyoshi Kusanagi and actress Yūko Takeuchi. The film is the fourth in the so-called "Boku Series" starring Kusanagi, and the first to based on a book. Much of the staff of the other three films continued their work on this film.

1,778 Stories of Me and My Wife was released in Japanese cinemas on 15 January 2011.

== Plot ==
Sci-fiction author Sakutaro Makimura spends his days giving life to his daydreams, and enjoys a peaceful relationship with his wife Setsuko. One day, Setsuko is struck with stomach pains, and is later diagnosed with bowel cancer and given one year to live. After being told by her doctors that laughter boosts the body's immune system, Sakutaro decides to write one short story for his wife every day.

== Cast ==
- Tsuyoshi Kusanagi as Sakutaro
- Yūko Takeuchi as Setsuko
- Ren Osugi as Setsuko's doctor
- Shosuke Tanihara as Takizawa, Sakutaro's best friend
- Michiko Kichise as Takizawa's wife
- Tai Kageyama (陰山泰) as Nimi, Sakutaro's editor
- Jun Fubuki as Setsuko's mother
- Yoko Imamoto as Sakutaro's mother
- Yasuto Kosuda (小須田康人) as a newspaper bill collector who appears in one of Sakutaro's short stories
- Kazuyuki Asano (浅野和之) as the owner of a toy store where Sakutaro buys the toy alien that inspires him to write his daily stories
- Sumie Sasaki (佐々木すみ江) as the Makimura's landlady
- Sakae Yamaura as a young Sakutaro
- Masaya Takahashi as a kindly hospital janitor who watches out for Sakutaro

== Release ==
The film was released nationwide on January 15, 2011, earning ¥159.7 million and ranking first in its opening weekend. On January 20, 2011, it was shown in a special screening attended by the Empress.
