= Megumu Sagisawa =

Japanese novelist and writer

- 鷺沢萠
- Born: Megumi Matsuo (松尾めぐみ, Matsuo Megumi); 20 June 1968; Setagaya City, Tokyo, Japan
- Died: 11 April 2004 (aged 35); Meguro, Tokyo, Japan
- Occupations: Novelist; dramatist
- Spouse: Gō Rijū (m. 1990–1991)
- Writing career
- Notable works: Kawaberi no michi; Kakeru shōnen
- Notable awards: Izumi Kyōka Prize for Literature; Bungakukai Prize for New Authors
- Website: meimei.la.coocan.jp

Megumu Sagisawa (鷺沢萠; 20 June 1968 – 11 April 2004) was the pen name of Japanese novelist and writer Megumi Matsuo (松尾めぐみ). Her works of fiction have been described as focusing on topics such as complex interpersonal relationships and the anxieties of the youth.

Sagisawa published her debut novel Kawaberi no michi (川べりの道, The Path by the River) in 1987, for which she became the youngest person to win the Bungakukai Prize for New Authors. She later won the 1992 Izumi Kyōka Prize for Literature for Kakeru shōnen (駆ける少年, The Running Boy) and became a five-time nominee for the Akutagawa Prize.

== Early life and family ==
Megumu Sagisawa was born in Tokyo, Japan on 20 June 1968, as the youngest of four sisters. Her parents divorced when she was fifteen years old. Sagisawa was of Korean descent. Her grandmother, born in Taechon, Korea, was a first-generation Korean immigrant to Japan who lived in Tokyo and married a Japanese man.

== Career ==
Sagisawa published her debut novel Kawaberi no michi (川べりの道, The Path by the River) in 1987, while she was in university, although she wrote it in high school. The novel received favourable attention due to its subtle portrayal of the struggles of adolescent life. She received the Bungakukai Prize for New Authors (文學界新人賞, Bungakukai Shinjinshō) for the novel, and became the youngest person to be awarded the prize at eighteen years old. She then began studying Russian at the Sophia University Department of Foreign Studies in the same year, but left the university before graduating.

In 1989, she published the novel Kaeremu hitobito (帰れぬ人びと, The Deceased), which became a candidate for the Akutagawa Prize, but did not win. Since then, she was selected as a candidate for the prize four more times. She was awarded the 1992 Izumi Kyōka Prize for Literature for her novel Kakeru shōnen (駆ける少年, The Running Boy). While writing the novel, she learned that her grandmother was originally from Korea. She began studying Korean language abroad at Yonsei University in 1993. In 2002, she published an autobiographical novel titled My Story (私の話, Watashi no hanashi).

Sagisawa was also a noted essayist and translator of children's picture books. She worked with screenwriter and director Hidetake Kobayashi at the Dolphin Group, a theatre company that produces comedies, until her death. Her book Welcome Home! (ウェルカム・ホーム！, Uerukamu hōmu) was first published in late March 2004, and was set to be staged under her own production in June.

== Selected works ==
Sagisawa's works of fiction have been described as focusing on topics such as complex interpersonal relationships and the "anxieties of young people." She released more than twenty novels and short story collections through her career, which have been translated into Italian, Korean, and English. Her works include:

- Kawaberi no michi (川べりの道, The Path by the River), 1987
- Kaerenu hitobito (帰れぬ人びと, The Deceased), Bungeishunjū, 1989
- Stairisshū kittzū (Stylish kids), Kawade Shobo Shinsha, 1990
- Kakeru shōnen (駆ける少年, The Running Boy), Bungeishunjū, 1992
  - English translation: Grillo, Tyran. The Running Boy and Other Stories, Cornell University Press, 2020
- Hangu rusu (Hang Loose), Kawade Shobo Shinsha, 1993
- Kenari mo hana, sakura mo hana (Forsythias are flowers, cherryblossoms too), 1994
- Kinema junpō (キネマ旬砲), Kadokawa Shoten, 2002
- La vie en Rose (ばら色の人生), Sakuhinsha, 2004 (with Hidetake Kobayashi)
- Uerukamu hōmu (ウェルカム・ホーム！, Welcome Home!), Shinchosha, 2006

== Personal life and death ==
Sagisawa married director Gō Rijū in 1990. They divorced a year later.

Sagisawa died on 11 April 2004 at her residence in Meguro, Tokyo, Japan. The cause of her death was initially reported as heart failure, but was later found by the Tokyo Metropolitan Police Department to have been a suicide. Following her death, Korean newspapers The Chosun Ilbo, The Hankyoreh, and The Dong-a Ilbo described her as one of Japan's leading female Korean writers.
