= Taiyo Fujii =

Japanese science fiction writer (born 1971)

Taiyo Fujii (藤井太洋, Fujii Taiyō) (born 1971 in Amami Ōshima) is a Japanese science fiction writer.

He debuted by self-publishing the e-book version of Gene Mapper in 2012, which was the top of the amazon.co.jp's Best of 2012 Kindle Books in Novel and Literature division. The revised version was published by Hayakawa Publishing in 2013.

He was the chair of Science Fiction and Fantasy Writers of Japan in 2015–2018.

== Awards ==
- 2015: Nihon SF Taisho for Orbital Cloud
- 2015: Seiun Award Japanese Long Form for Orbital Cloud
- 2022: Seiun Award Japanese Long Form for Man-kinds

== Works ==
=== English translations, long form ===
- Gene Mapper (2015), translation of Gene Mapper —full build— (2013)
- Orbital Cloud (2017), translation of Orbital Cloud (2014)

=== English translations, short form ===
- Hello, World! (ハロー・ワールド), chapter excerpt translated by Reiko Seri and Doc Kane. Kobe, Japan, Maplopo, 2020.
- "Violation of the TrueNet Security Act" (2015), translation of "Koraborēshon" (コラボレーション) (2012)
- "A Fair War" (2016), translation of "Kōseiteki sentō kihan" (公正的戦闘規範) (2015)
- "Eternal Boiler" (2019), translation of "Fumetsu no koiru" (不滅のコイル) (2015)
- "Just Like Migratory Birds" (2021), translation of "Marude wataridori no youni" (まるで渡り鳥のように) (2021)
