= Masahiko Shimada =

Japanese writer

- 島田雅彦
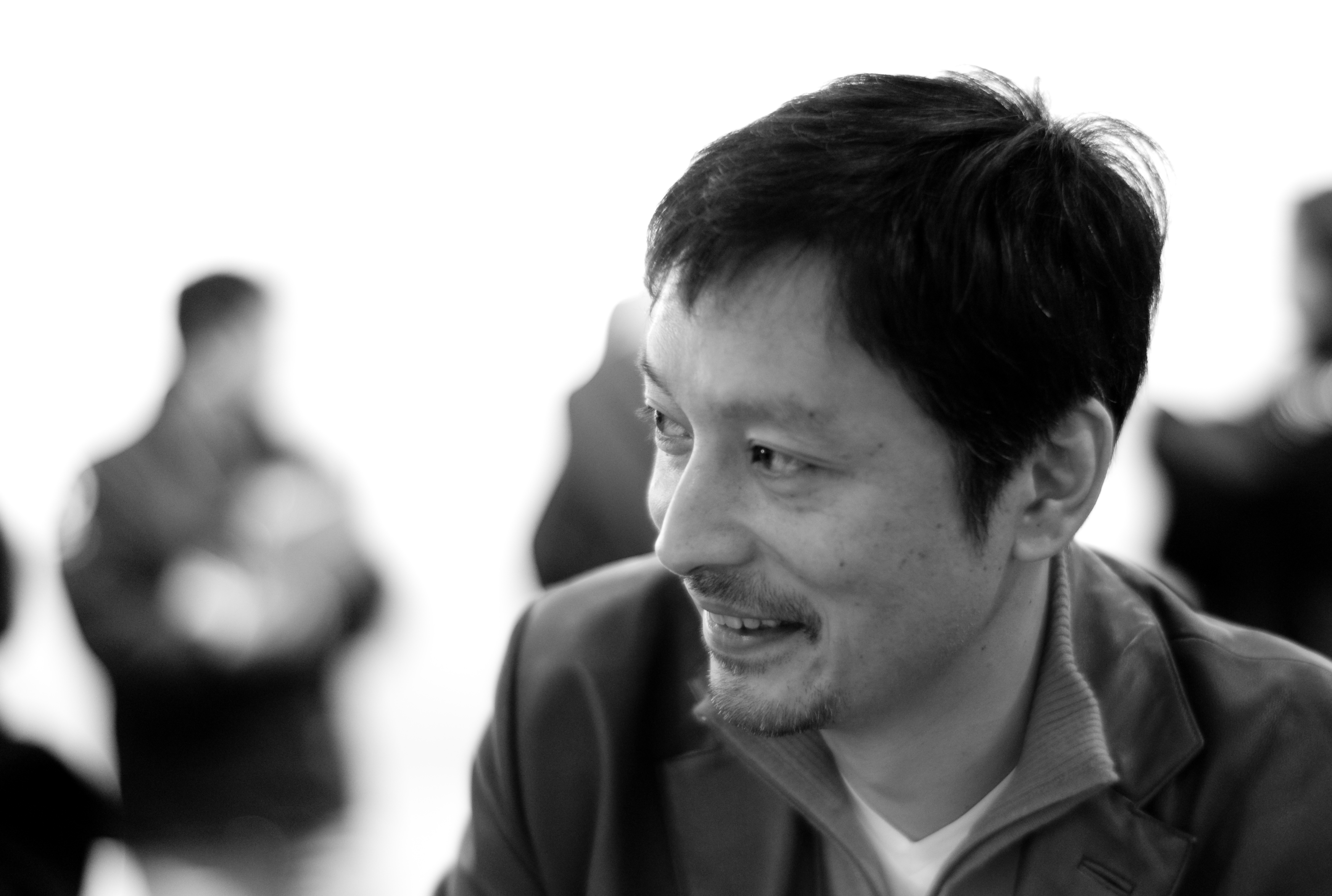
- Masahiko Shimada in 2007
- Born: 1961 (age 64–65)
- Education: Tokyo University of Foreign Studies
- Occupation: Writer
- Writing career
- Language: Japanese
- Genre: Fiction
- Notable awards: Noma Literary New Face Prize; Izumi Kyōka Prize for Literature; Mainichi Publishing Culture Award

Masahiko Shimada (島田 雅彦, Shimada Masahiko; born 1961) is a Japanese writer. He has won the Noma Literary New Face Prize, the Izumi Kyōka Prize for Literature, the Itō Sei Literature Prize, and the Mainichi Publishing Culture Award. His work has been translated into English.

== Biography ==
While studying Russian at Tokyo University of Foreign Studies, Shimada published a story called Yasashii sayoku no tame no Kiyuukyoku (The Cassation for the Soft Left-wingers) that was nominated for the Akutagawa Prize. The next year he won the 6th Noma Literary New Face Prize for his novel Muyū ōkoku no tame no ongaku (夢遊王国のための音楽, Music for the Kingdom of Somnambulism).

Yumetsukai (夢使い, Dream Messenger) was published in Japan in 1989, with an English translation by Philip Gabriel following in 1992. In her review for The New York Times, Julia Just praised Dream Messenger as "proof that the Japanese novel is taking some fantastic turns in the hands of a new generation of writers." A 2017 retrospective review by Stephen Mansfield of The Japan Times described Dream Messenger as "existential novel that manages to remain firmly grounded within the parameters of a compelling narrative." The same year that Dream Messenger was published in English, Shimada won the 20th Izumi Kyōka Prize for Literature for Higan Sensei (彼岸先生), a parody of Natsume Sōseki's novel Kokoro.

Shimada wrote the libretto for Shigeaki Saegusa's opera Chūshingura, which Werner Herzog directed in its 1997 Tokyo debut.

Shimada directed and performed in his own play Yurariumu (Ulalium) in 1990. His Japanese translation of Steve Erickson's Rubicon Beach appeared in 1991.

In 2016 Shimada won the 70th Mainichi Publishing Culture Award for his novel Kyojin no hoshi (虚人の星).

== Recognition ==
- 1984: 6th Noma Literary New Face Prize
- 1992: 20th Izumi Kyōka Prize for Literature
- 2006: 17th Itō Sei Literature Prize
- 2016: 70th Mainichi Publishing Culture Award
- 2022: Medal with Purple Ribbon

== Bibliography ==
- 夢遊王国のための音楽 (Muyū ōkoku no tame no ongaku) (Kodansha, 1984). Music for a Somnambulant Kingdom
- Yumetsukai (夢使い) (Kodansha, 1989). Dream Messenger, trans. Philip Gabriel (Kodansha, 1992, ISBN 9784770015358)
- Miira ni naru made (1990). Until I Am a Mummy
- Armadillo (Shinchosha, 1991), ISBN 4101187037
- Higan Sensei (彼岸先生) (Fukutake Shoten, 1992, ISBN 9784828824215)
- Jiyū shikei (自由死刑) (1999). Death by Choice, trans. Meredith McKinney (Thames River Press, 2013, ISBN 9780857282477)
- Kyojin no hoshi (虛人の星), Kodansha, 2015, ISBN 9784062197434
