= Chiaki Kawamata =

Japanese science fiction writer and critic

- Born: December 4, 1948 (age 77); Otaru, Hokkaido, Japan
- Occupations: Science fiction writer, critic
- Known for: Genshi-gari, Yume no Kotoba, Kotoba no Yume, Emblem of Roto

Chiaki Kawamata (川又千秋, Kawamata Chiaki; born December 4, 1948 in Otaru, Hokkaidō, Japan) is a Japanese science fiction writer and critic. He has won both the Seiun Award and the Nihon SF Taisho Award for Genshi-gari (Death Sentences). Kawamata is also noted for writing the story of the manga Emblem of Roto. Chiaki Asaoka (浅丘ちあき) is his alias name.

== Biography ==
Born at Otaru city, Hokkaido, Kawamata graduated from the Faculty of Japanese literature in the Keio University. He started his fanzine activities from high school, and became a member of the Ichinohi-kai of the SF Fanzine circle "Uchū Kiryū" (宇宙気流) after moving to Tokyo. In 1972, Kawamata joined the advertising agency Hakuhodo. While working as a copywriter, He continued to submit his works to science fiction magazine.

Kawamata published his long criticism "Yume no Kotoba, Kotoba no Yume" on the S-F Magazine from 1973 to 1975, and debuted as a critic. He also published short SF stories such as "Yume no Camera" (1976) etc. at the Kiso tengai and other magazines. In 1979, Kawamata published long adventure story "Kaijin no Gyakushū" (海神の逆襲) in Tokema novels series. This year, he left the Hakuhodo and became a full-time writer. Kawamata won the Nihon SF Taisho Award for Genshi-gari in 1984.

== Awards ==
- 1981: Seiun Award Japanese Long Form Award for Kaseijin Senshi
- 1984: Nihon SF Taisho for Genshigari

== Selected works ==
=== Novels ===
- Kaijin no Gyakushū (海神の逆襲, コマンド・タンガロア), 1979, Tokuma Shoten
  - Sekidō no Makai (赤道の魔界, デビル・カビラ) 1980, Tokuma Shoten
  - Genjū no Misshi (幻獣の密使, エンボイ・カビアンコ) 1981, Tokuma Shoten
- Hanzaishi no Kagami (反在士の鏡) 1981, Hayakawa Publishing
  - (Hanzaishi no Yubiwa (反在士の指環) 2001, Tokuma Shoten)
- Ajin Senshi (亜人戦士) 1981, Tokuma Shoten
  - Shinwa Seidan (神話星団) 1983, Tokuma Shoten
  - Chikyū Seifuku (地球征服) 1985, Tokuma Shoten
- Jikan Teikoku (時間帝国) 1984, Kadokawa Shoten
- Genshi-gari (幻詩狩り) 1984, Chuokoron-sha
- Hoshi Kariudo (星狩人) 1985, Kōdansha
  - Ningen Bokujō (人間牧場) 1985, Kōdansha
  - Kisei Dōmei (寄生同盟) 1986, Kōdansha
  - Genzai Toshi (原罪都市) 1987, Kōdansha
- Kokū no Sōtōheidan (虚空の総統兵団) 1985, Chuokoron-sha
  - Jukai no Sōtōheidan (呪界の総統兵団) 1986, Chuokoron-sha
  - Sōtōheidan, Senkōsu (総統兵団, 潜行す) 1988, Chuokoron-sha
- Alice-ga Oka (アリスが丘) 1989, Futaba-sha (Note: Under pen-name Chiaki Asaoka (浅丘ちあき))
- Rabaul Reppū Kūsenroku (ラバウル烈風空戦録) 1989-0615 to 1997-0625 (15 volumes + 3 spin-off volumes) Chuokoron-sha (Note: Simulation novels, Imaginary battles series.)
- Suimu (水夢) 1995, Aspect (collection of fantasy stories)
- Hanzaishi no Yubiwa (反在士の指環) 2001, Tokuma Shoten

=== Criticism ===
- Yume no Kotoba, Kotoba no Yume (夢の言葉, 言葉の夢), 1981, Kisōtengai-sha
- Muishiki no Jidai (夢意識の時代―SF論集), 1987-0425, Chuokoron-sha (ISBN 978-4120015748)

== English translations ==
- Death Sentences (2012), translation of Genshigari (幻詩狩り) (1984)
- 46 Okunen Monogatari ~The Shinka Ron~ (46億年物語 －THE進化論－, "4.6 Billion Year Story: The Theory of Evolution") 1990 (Storywriter)

== Notes and references ==
=== References ===
- Masao Higashi and Ran Ishidō eds. The Dictionary of Japanese Fantasy Writers, 2009, Kokusho-kankō-kai, 東雅夫, 石堂藍編『日本幻想作家事典』国書刊行会, (2009), ISBN 978-4-336-05142-4 pp. 197–198
