= Chin Shunshin =

Taiwanese and Japanese novelist, translator and cultural critic (1924–2015)

- 陳 舜臣
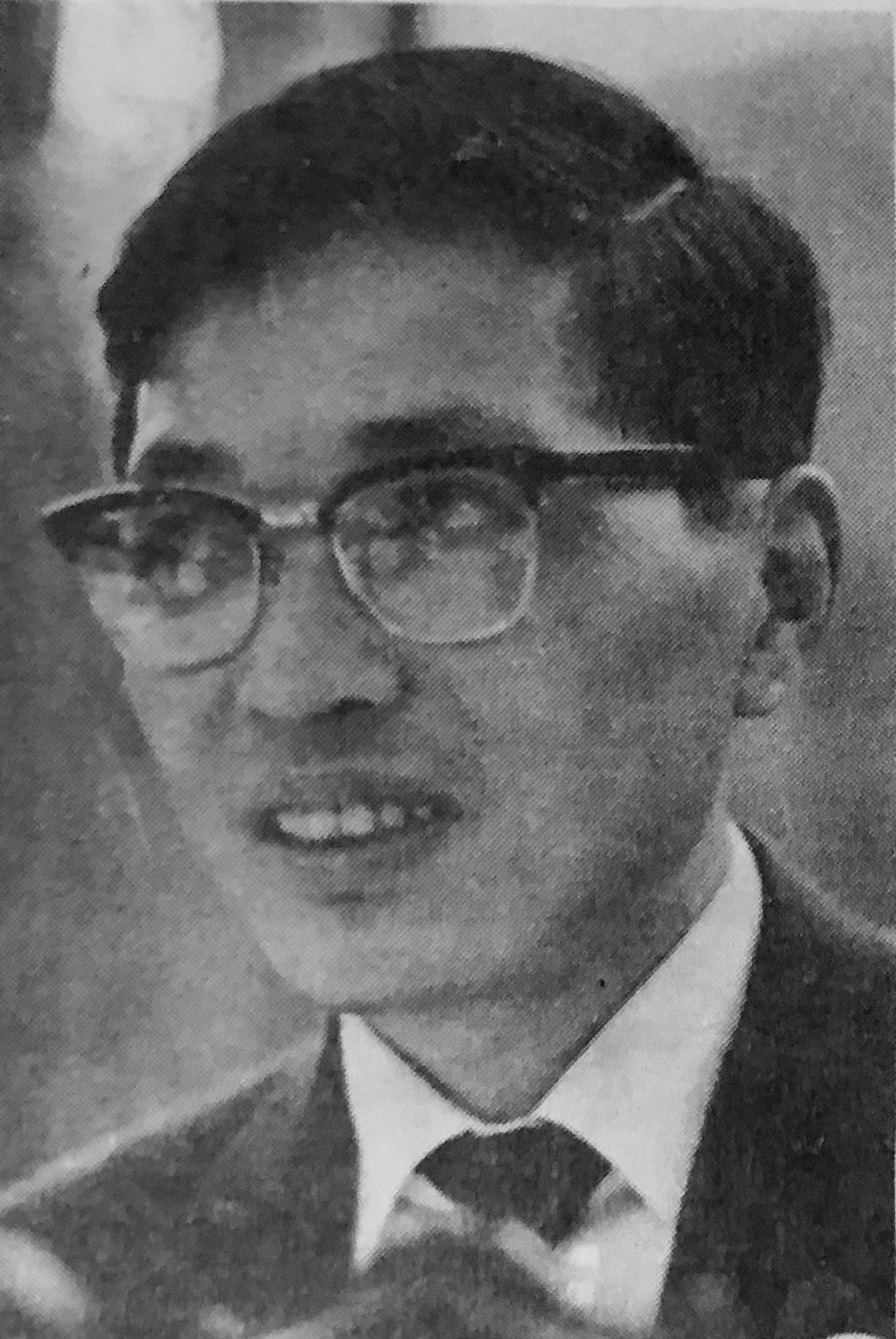
- Born: 18 February 1924; Kobe, Japan
- Died: 21 January 2015 (aged 90); Kobe, Japan
- Occupations: writer, critic
- Writing career
- Genres: novels, cultural critics
- Notable awards: Naoki Prize; Yoshikawa Eiji Prize for Literature

Chin Shunshin or Chen Shunchen (陳 舜臣) (18 February 1924 – 21 January 2015) was a Taiwanese-Japanese novelist, translator and cultural critic. He is best known for his historical fictions and mystery novels based on Chinese and Asian history, including First Opium War, Chinese History, Ryukyu Wind. He won numerous literary awards, including the Yoshikawa Eiji Prize for Literature and the Naoki Prize.

== Major works ==
- Roots of Dried Grass (枯草の根)
- House Three Colors - Showa Treasure Mysteries (三色の家), Fusosha
- The Blue Jade Lion Incense Burner (青玉獅子香炉)
- Chinese History (中国の歴史)
- Ryukyu Wind (琉球の風)
- Genghis Khan's Family (チンギス・ハーンの一族)
- The Taiping Rebellion. Translated by Joshua A. Fogel. orig. Taihei Tengoku. Armonk, N.Y.: M.E. Sharpe. 2001. ISBN 0765601001.

== Awards ==
- The 23rd Mystery Writers of Japan Award
- The 7th Edogawa Rampo Prize in 1961 for 枯草の根
- The 60th Naoki Prize (1968下) for The Blue Jade Lion Incense Burner
- The 26th Yoshikawa Eiji Prize for Literature (1992) for Shokatsu Kōmei (諸葛孔明)

== See also ==
- Ryōtarō Shiba
- Japanese literature
- List of Japanese authors
