= Mori Masaki =

Japanese manga artist

- 真崎 守
- Born: Masaki Mori (森 柾); March 10, 1941 (age 84); Yokohama, Kanagawa Prefecture, Japan
- Occupation(s): Manga artist, anime director, screenwriter
- Years active: 1963-1986

Mori Masaki (真崎 守, Masaki Mori, born March 10, 1941 in Yokohama) is a Japanese manga artist, screenwriter and director.

Masaki's career as an animator began in 1963 at Mushi Production, where he was involved in Kimba the White Lion. After a few more works, he left the studio in 1968 and dedicated himself to his work as a mangaka. In 1979, he returned to the film and worked at Studio Madhouse as a director and screenwriter. He directed Natsu e no Tobira and Haguregumo, later wrote the screenplay for the film adaptation of the manga Barefoot Gen and the sci-fi adventure Toki no Tabibito: Time Stranger. In 1986, Masaki retired from anime, although he continued his manga career into the 90s.

== Bibliography ==
- Jiro ga Yuku (1971)
- Jōhachi Shigure (1972)
- Kiba no Monshō (1972)

== Filmography ==
- 1963: Kimba the White Lion (Animator)
- 1964: Tetsuwan Atom: Uchū no Yūsha (Production Assistant)
- 1968: Sabu to Ichi Torimono Hikae (Episode Director)
- 1968: Wanpaku Tanteidan (Producer)
- 1979: Animation Kikō Marco Polo no Bōken (Episode Director)
- 1981: Natsu e no Tobira (Director)
- 1982: Haguregumo (Director)
- 1983: Barefoot Gen (Director)
- 1983: Harmagedon: Genma Taisen (Screenplay, Design)
- 1985: Babī ni Kubittake (Design)
- 1985: The Dagger of Kamui (Screenplay)
- 1986: Toki no Tabibito – Time Stranger (Director, Screenplay)
