= Masako Mori (writer) =

Japanese author (born 1944)

- Born: January 4, 1944 (age 82); Yokohama
- Writing career
- Language: Japanese

Masako Mori (森 真沙子 Mori Masako, born January 4, 1944) is the pen name of Masako Fukae (深江雅子 Fukae Masako) a Japanese author, mystery writer, horror writer and historical novelist.

Mori was born in Yokohama, in the Kanagawa Prefecture. She attended Hokkaido Hakodate Nishi High School and graduated from Nara Women's University. She then worked as a magazine and weekly magazine reporter. In 1979, her first published work, the short story "Ballad in Blue" (バラード・イン・ブルー, Barādo in burū ) won the 33 Shōsetsu Gendai Shinjinshō Award (小説現代新人賞). Her early works contained elements of mystery and suspense while her later works increased her scope of interest to the genre of horror and historical novel.
