= Chōhei Kambayashi =

Japanese science fiction writer (born 1953)

- 神林 長平
- Born: Kiyoshi Takayanagi (高柳 清, Takayanagi Kiyoshi); July 10, 1953 (age 73); Niigata, Japan
- Education: Nagaoka National College of Technology
- Occupation: Novelist
- Writing career
- Genre: Science fiction
- Notable awards: Short Form – Seiun Award 1983 Kotobazukaishi 1984 Super Phoenix 2013 Ima shūgōteki muishiki o, Long Form – Seiun Award 1984 Teki wa kaizoku kaizokuban 1985 Sentō Yōsei Yukikaze 1987 Prism 1998 Teki wa kaizoku A-kyū no teki 2000 Good Luck Sentō Yōsei Yukikaze; Nihon SF Taisho Award 1995 Kototsubo

Chōhei Kambayashi (神林長平, Kanbayashi Chōhei) (born July 10, 1953) is a Japanese science fiction writer.

Born in Niigata, Kambayashi graduated Nagaoka National College of Technology. He debuted in 1979 with the short story "Dance with a Fox", which was an honorable mention of the 5th Hayakawa SF Contest. He quickly became fan favorite, and he won the Seiun Award eight times (five for novels, three for short stories) during his career. In a 2006 SF Magazine poll he was ranked third best Japanese SF writer of all time; and in 2014 poll, the second.

Kambayashi received Nihon SF Taishō Award in 1995 for Kototsubo. He was the chairman of Science Fiction and Fantasy Writers of Japan in 2001-2003.

His writing often blurs reality and alternate reality. Early works, such as May Peace Be On Your Soul, were often compared to Philip K. Dick, as Kambayashi himself acknowledges that Dick's works led him to science fiction writing.

Probably his most popular work is Yukikaze. It was made into an animated video series in 2002-2005.

Another popular work, Enemy Is Pirate, which consists of nine books (as of 2013), is a lighter toned space opera series. There was an animated video series released in 1989.

== Bibliography ==
Titles with asterisk * are short story collection. Titles with dagger † are series story collection.

- Kitsune to odore (狐と踊れ; Dance with a Fox) (1981, ISBN 4-15-030142-5); New edition (2010, ISBN 978-4-15-030995-4) dropped "Teki wa kaizoku" and added "Rakusa", "Tsuta momiji", "Bakurei", "Kisei". *
- Anata no tamashii ni yasuragiare (あなたの魂に安らぎあれ) (1983)
- Shichidō otoshi (七胴落とし) (1983)
- Teki wa kaizoku, kaizokuban (敵は海賊・海賊版; Enemy Pirates, Pirate Edition) (1983)
- Kotobatsukaishi (言葉使い師) (1983) *
- Sentō yōsei yukikaze (戦闘妖精・雪風) (1984); Revised version: Sentō yōsei yukikaze <kai> (戦闘妖精・雪風<改>) (2002); English translation: Yukikaze (2010, ISBN 978-1-4215-3255-4, published by Viz Media/Haikasoru) †
- Taiyō no ase (太陽の汗) (1985)
- Purizumu (プリズム; Prism) (1986) †
- Uchū tansaki mēwaku ichiban (宇宙探査機 迷惑一番) (1986)
- Koyoi, ginga o hai ni shite (今宵、銀河を杯にして) (1987)
- Aoi kuchizuke (蒼いくちづけ) (1987)
- Kikai tachi no jikan (機械たちの時間) (1987) †
- Jikanshoku (時間触) (1987) *
- Teki wa kaizoku, neko tachi no kyōen (敵は海賊・猫たちの饗宴) (1988)
- Runatikan (ルナティカン) (1988)
- Kafuka toshi (過負荷都市) (1988) †
- Yū no sekai (Uの世界) (1989) †
- Teiō no kara (帝王の殻) (1990)
- Shinsetsu ga ippai (親切がいっぱい) (1990)
- Kanpeki na namida (完璧な涙) (1990) †
- Ware katarite sekai ari (我語りて世界あり) (1990)
- Teki wa kaizoku, kaizoku tachi no yūutsu (敵は海賊・海賊たちの憂鬱) (1991)
- 死して咲く花、実のある夢 Shi shite saku hana, mi no aru yume (1992)
- Izayoi no tsuki (猶予の月) (1992)
- Tengoku ni sokkuri na hoshi (天国にそっくりな星) (1993)
- Teki wa kaizoku, futeki na kyūka (敵は海賊・不敵な休暇) (1993)
- Kototsubo (言壷) (1994) †
- Teki wa kaizoku, kaizoku ka no ichinichi (敵は海賊・海賊課の一日) (1995)
- Tamashii no kudōtai (魂の駆動体) (1995)
- Raitojīn no isan (ライトジーンの遺産) (1997) †
- Teki wa kaizoku, Ei kyū no teki (敵は海賊・A級の敵) (1997)
- Guddo rakku sentō yōsei yukikaze (グッドラック 戦闘妖精・雪風) (1999); English translation: Good Luck, Yukikaze (2011, ISBN 978-1-4215-3901-0)
- Eikyū kikan sōchi (永久帰還装置) (2001)
- Rāzefon jikan chōritsushi (ラーゼフォン 時間調律師) (2002)
- Koyubi no saki no tenshi (小指の先の天使) (2003) *
- Bakugekiki no tobu sora (麦撃機の飛ぶ空) (2004) *
- Hadae no shita (膚の下) (2004)
- Kyōzō no teki (鏡像の敵) (2005) *
- Teki wa kaizoku, seigi no me (敵は海賊・正義の眼) (2007)
- Anburōkun arō sentō yōsei yukikaze (アンブロークン アロー 戦闘妖精・雪風; Unbroken Arrow) (2009)
- Teki wa kaizoku, tanpenban (敵は海賊・短篇版) (2009) *
- Ima shūgōteki muishiki o (いま集合的無意識を、) (2012) *
- ぼくらは都市を愛していた Bokura wa toshi o aisite ita (2012)
- Teki wa kaizoku, kaizoku no teki (敵は海賊・海賊の敵) (2013)
- Dare no musuko demo nai (だれの息子でもない) (2014)
- Kōshudai no mokushiroku (絞首台の黙示録) (2015)
- Fomaruhauto no mittsu no shokudai (フォマルハウトの三つの燭台) (2017)
- Ōbārōdo no machi (オーバーロードの街) (2017)
