= Mizuko Masuda =

Japanese writer (born 1948)

- 増田 みず子
- Born: 13 November 1948 (age 77); Tokyo, Japan
- Education: Tokyo University of Agriculture and Technology

Masuda Mizuko (増田 みず子, Masuda Mizuko; born 13 November 1948, in Tokyo) is a Japanese writer.

Masuda attended the Tokyo University of Agriculture and Technology, where she obtained a diploma in plant immunology in 1973. She taught at the Department of Biochemistry at the Faculty of Medicine at Nihon University until 1980.

Masuda's first story "Shigo No Kankei" was nominated for the new writer's prize in Shincho magazine. In 1983, she was nominated six times for the Akutagawa Prize. She also won the Noma Award for "Jiyū jikan" (1985), the Kyōka Izumi Prize for "Shinguru Seru" (1986) and the Sei Itō Prize for "Tsukuyomi" (2001).
