= Masami Fukushima =

Japanese editor, author, critic, and translator

Masami Fukushima (福島 正実, Fukushima Masami; February 18, 1929, Sakhalin - April 9, 1976) was a Japanese science fiction editor, author, critic, and translator. As the first chief editor of SF Magazine, he helped popularize science fiction in Japan and became known as the "Demon of SF". His real name is Masami Katō (加藤 正実, Katō Masami). He also used the pen name: Kyō Katō (加藤 喬, Katō Kyō).

== Biography ==
Born in Toyohara, Karafuto (now Yuzhno-Sakhalinsk, Sakhalin), Fukushima was the son of a public official. His family moved to Manchuria after his father's transfer in 1934. In 1937 they moved to the mainland of Japan. Fukushima grew up in Yokohama.

He entered Nihon University in 1945 and transferred to Meiji University in 1950, where he majored in French literature. In 1954 he dropped out and began to study translation under Shunji Shimizu (清水俊二, Shimizu Shunji) and writing children's literature under Tatsuzo Nasu (那須辰造, Nasu Tatsuzō).

In 1956, Fukushima was invited to join Hayakawa Publishing. The following year, he initiated the Hayakawa SF series and in 1959 founded S-F Magazine and served as chief editor until he left the company in 1969. Hayakawa World SF Complete Collection was also planned by Fukushima.

He aimed to make SF more highbrow, and initially rejected space opera. To avoid being considered "childish literature", Fukushima adopted exclusively the paintings of Seikan Nakajima for the covers of SF Magazine and Hayakawa SF series. (see covers) He, along with Shinichi Sekizawa, wrote the 1974 film Godzilla vs. Mechagodzilla.

Beside his work in widening the Japanese SF genre, he translated many English SF authors, including Isaac Asimov, Arthur C. Clarke, and Robert A. Heinlein, into Japanese and edited SF anthologies.

Fukushima died in 1976, aged 47. There is a prize for Juvenile SF in his memory.

== Works in English translation ==
- "The Flower's Life Is Short" (Speculative Japan, Kurodahan Press, 2007)
