= Hayakawa SF Contest =

- Awarded for: Japanese science fiction
- Country: Japan
- Presented by: Hayakawa Publishing
- First award: 1962

Hayakawa SF Contest (ハヤカワ・SFコンテスト, Hayakawa Esuefu Kontesuto) is a Japanese literary award conducted by Hayakawa Publishing Corporation. This contest prizes unpublished science fiction works to recruit new writers of the genre.

It began as the Scientific-fiction Contest (空想科学小説コンテスト, Kūsō Kagaku Shōsetsu Kontesuto) for short story/novellete on the Hayakawa's SF Magazine in 1962. It was renamed for the second contest and held 18 times until 1992. Past debutants include Sakyō Komatsu, Ryu Mitsuse, Yasutaka Tsutsui, and Chōhei Kambayashi.

It resumed as a novel/novella contest in 2013, removing the interpunct from the name (ハヤカワSFコンテスト) and the number was reset to one.
