= Hayakawa Publishing =

Japanese publishing company

Hayakawa Publishing Corporation
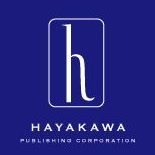
- Native name: 株式会社早川書房
- Romanized name: Kabushiki-gaisha Hayakawa Shobō
- Company type: Private KK
- Industry: Publishing
- Genre: science fiction; fantasy; crime fiction; nonfiction
- Founded: August 1945; 80 years ago in Japan
- Founder: Kiyoshi Hayakawa
- Headquarters: Tachō, Chiyoda, Tokyo, Japan
- Area served: Japan
- Key people: Hiroshi Hayakawa (president)
- Products: Books; magazines
- Brands: Hayakawa Bunko; Hayakawa Library; Hayakawa Mystery; Hayakawa Novels; Hayakawa SF Series
- Services: Publishing
- Total equity: ¥35,000,000 (2016)
- Number of employees: 83 (2016)
- Website: hayakawa-online.co.jp

Hayakawa Publishing, Inc. (株式会社早川書房, Kabushiki-gaisha Hayakawa Shobō; trading as the Hayakawa Publishing Corporation) is a Japanese publishing company, founded in 1945 by Kiyoshi Hayakawa as a crime fiction publisher. It is the largest science fiction publisher in Japan; almost all winners of the Seiun Award for Best Foreign Novel are published by the company.

Notable books written by Japanese authors that are published by Hayakawa are Crest of the Stars and G.I. Samurai.

In 2022, Hiroshi Hayakawa, for 30 years the president of Hayakawa Publishing (having worked since 1965 at the independent family firm), was the recipient of the London Book Fair Lifetime Achievement Award "for his decades-long work in bringing international authors to the Japanese market, as well as his championing of science fiction, crime and non-fiction titles in Japan".

== Magazines ==
- S-F Magazine (first published February 1960)
- Ellery Queen's Mystery Magazine (Japanese edition of the American magazine, first published in June 1956)
- Higeki Kigeki (悲劇喜劇, a theatrical magazine first published in 1928 by Kunio Kishida)

== Imprints ==
Hayakawa publishes books under a number of imprints.

- Hayakawa Mystery
- Hayakawa SF Series (December 1957–November 1974, 318 volumes)
- Hayakawa Library (1962–1969)
- Hayakawa Novels
- Hayakawa Nonfiction
- Kaigai SF Novels
- Mysterious Press Books (on hiatus since 1988)
- Shin Hayakawa SF Series (since December 2011)
- Hayakawa Bunko
  - Hayakawa Bunko SF (for translated foreign science fiction works)
  - Hayakawa Bunko JA
  - Hayakawa Mystery Bunko
  - Hayakawa Comic Bunko (under the Hayakawa Bunko JA imprint)
  - Jisedaigata Sakka no Real Fiction (under the Hayakawa Bunko JA imprint)
  - Hayakawa Engeki Bunko
- Hayakawa Mystery World
- Hayakawa SF Series J-Collection
- Sōzōryoku Bungaku
- Hayakawa Shinsho Juice
