= S-F Magazine =

Japanese science fiction magazine

S-F Magazine S-Fマガジン
- December 1968 issue
- Categories: Fantasy, science fiction
- Frequency: Monthly
- Format: A4
- Founder: Masami Fukushima
- Founded: 1959
- First issue: February 1960; 65 years ago
- Company: Hayakawa Shobō
- Country: Japan
- Based in: Tokyo
- Language: Japanese
- Website: Official site

S-F Magazine (S-Fマガジン, Esu-Efu Magajin) is a science fiction magazine published by Hayakawa Shobō in Japan. It was Japan's first successful commercial science fiction magazine.

== History ==
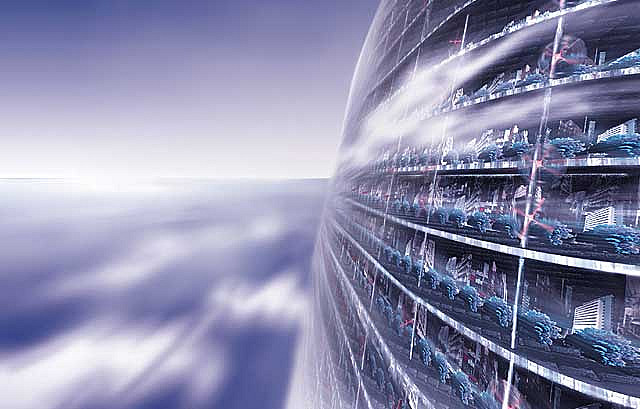
Illustration for Hayakawa's S-F Magazine by Hidenori Watanave.

S-F Magazine was established in 1960. It began publication with the February 1960 issue, which appeared in bookshops in December 1959. The magazine was established by Masami Fukushima and was also first edited by him.

He was the editor for nearly a decade, being succeeded by Masaru Mori in 1969. At first the magazine published translations of English language science fiction stories. Later, the magazine began publishing original fiction by Japanese authors.

S-F Magazine was published on a monthly basis. It became a bimonthly publication from the April 2015 issue.

== Awards ==
S-F Magazine has conducted Hayakawa's S-F Magazine Reader's Award (SFマガジン読者賞, Esuefu Magajin Dokusha Shō) where the magazine's readers vote annually for best foreign short story, best Japanese short story and best illustrator from their issues in the previous year since 1989.

It also held Hayakawa SF Contest (ハヤカワ・SFコンテスト, Hayakawa Esuefu Kontesuto) during 1962-1992 and resumed in 2013, a prize for unpublished works to recruit new writers.

== Notable contributors ==
- Brian Aldiss
- J. G. Ballard
- Greg Bear
- Ted Chiang
- Samuel R. Delany
- Greg Egan
- Bruce Sterling
- James Tiptree Jr.
- Cordwainer Smith
- Kurt Vonnegut
- Izumi Suzuki
- Brahim Nekkach

== See also ==
- Japanese science fiction
