= Sogen SF Short Story Prize =

Japanese literary award

- Awarded for: Japanese science fiction and related genres
- Country: Japan
- Presented by: Tokyo Sogensha
- First award: 2010; 16 years ago
- Website: www.tsogen.co.jp/award/sfss/

The Sogen SF Short Story Prize (創元SF短編賞, Sōgen SF Tanpen Shō) is an annual Japanese literary award conducted by Tokyo Sogensha since 2010. It is a prize contest for original unpublished stories of science fiction and other related genres. It is mainly intended for amateur writers, but also open to who have professional publications.

The winning stories have been published in the year's-best Japanese SF anthology series from the publisher's imprint Sōgen SF Bunko until 2019. Since 2020, they will be included in Genesis, the publisher's hard cover SFF series. Since 2023, they will be appeared on the publisher's magazine Shimi no Techo.

In 2010 and 2011, some of finalist stories were collected into original anthology series Beyond Imagination (原色の想像力, Genshoku no Sōzōryoku).

Until 2019, Regular judges have been Nozomi Ohmori (critic/translator/anthologist) and Sanzō Kusaka (critic/anthologist), who have edited the year's-best. Another notable author have been invited as a guest judge each year.

== Recognition ==
Yūsuke Miyauchi's first collection Banjō no Yoru (盤上の夜) was nominated for the 147th Naoki Prize and won the 2012 Nihon SF Taisho Award.

Dempow Torishima's first collection Kaikin no To (皆勤の徒) won the 2013 Nihon SF Taisho Award. The English translation of the book, Sisyphean, was published in 2018, following that the original award-winning novella "Kaikin no To" was translated into English as "Sisyphean" and included in the English anthology Phantasm Japan. His first novel Yadokari no Hoshi (宿借りの星) also won the 2019 Nihon SF Taisho Award.

== Winners ==
English titles are for translated stories.

Year	Submissions	Awards	Title	Author(s)	Guest judge
2010	612	Winner	Agari (あがり)	Yūri Matsuzaki	Masaki Yamada
2010	612	Second place	Udon, Kitsune-tsuki no (うどん キツネつきの)	Haneko Takayama	Masaki Yamada
2010	612	Special citation by Nozomi Ohmori	Saezuri no Utyū	Yūichi Sakanaga	Masaki Yamada
2010	612	Special citation by Sanzō Kusaka	Tsuchi no Chiri	Takashi Yamashita	Masaki Yamada
2010	612	Special citation by Masaki Yamada	Banjō no Yoru (盤上の夜)	Yūsuke Miyauchi	Masaki Yamada
2011	594	Winner	Sisyphean (皆勤の徒, Kaikin no To)	Dempow Torishima	Akira Hori
2011	594	Second place	Mayu no Miru Yume	Shunshō Utsugi	Akira Hori
2011	594	Special citation by Nozomi Ohmori	Hana to Shōnen	Niro Katase	Akira Hori
2011	594	Special citation by Sanzō Kusaka	Kudan no Hitomi	Tatsuhiko Shibo	Akira Hori
2011	594	Special citation by Akira Hori	Mono Mina Ikoeru	Tsutomu Oshizawa	Akira Hori
2012	618	Winner	Subete no Yume Hateru Chi de (〈すべての夢｜果てる地で〉)	Teiji Riyama	Hirotaka Tobi
2012	618	Second place	Prometheus no Bansan	Takehiko Okishi	Hirotaka Tobi
2012	618	Special citation by Nozomi Ohmori	Terra no Suisō	Aoba Minazuki	Hirotaka Tobi
2012	618	Special citation by Sanzō Kusaka	Atamayama	Ei Funazato	Hirotaka Tobi
2012	618	Special citation by Hirotaka Tobi	Enu Shi	Toshimichi Watanabe	Hirotaka Tobi
2013	576	Winner	Gingafū Hansō (銀河風帆走)	Kenrei Miyanishi	Toh Enjoe
2013	576	Special citation by Nozomi Ohmori	The Unknown Hero: Secret Origin	Tateaki Kashima	Toh Enjoe
2013	576	Special citation by Sanzō Kusaka	Kyōren no Onna Shishō	Maki Takatsuki	Toh Enjoe
2013	576	Special citation by Toh Enjoe	Huminshō Kitan	Yoda Kee	Toh Enjoe
2014	461	Winners	Fūga (風牙)	Mitsuhiro Monden	Hideaki Sena
2014	461	Winners	Landscape to Natsu no Teiri (ランドスケープと夏の定理)	Yūya Takashima	Hideaki Sena
2014	461	Special citation by Nozomi Ohmori	Onna Tomodachi	Satoshi Arii	Hideaki Sena
2014	461	Special citation by Sanzō Kusaka	Kaijū	Takurō Urade	Hideaki Sena
2014	461	Special citation by Hideaki Sena	Ken ha Deja vu	Shūzaemon Goudo	Hideaki Sena
2015	510	Winner	Kamigami no Hohō (神々の歩法)	Iori Miyazawa	Riku Onda
2015	510	Special citation by Nozomi Ohmori	Kono Kogoeta Sekai ni Umareru Mae ni	Eiichi Ube	Riku Onda
2015	510	Special citation by Sanzō Kusaka	Kimitachi Kyoshitsu ni Hairinasai	Tomoko Itō	Riku Onda
2015	510	Special citation by Riku Onda	Bakko Chan	Mayu Henmi	Riku Onda
2016	464	Winner	Yoshida Dōmei (吉田同名)	Muneo Ishikawa	Hiroshi Yamamoto
2016	464	Special citation by Nozomi Ohmori	Saibō Remin no Meikai Shindo Live	Ren Fukami	Hiroshi Yamamoto
2016	464	Special citation by Sanzō Kusaka	Kurueyo.	Ifu Azumi	Hiroshi Yamamoto
2016	464	Special citation by Hiroshi Yamamoto	Niji no Ishi	Toshin Kagami	Hiroshi Yamamoto
2017	417	Winner	74-Byō no Seijaku to Kodoku (七十四秒の静寂と孤独)	Mikihiko Hisanaga	Satoshi Hase
2017	417	Special citation by Satoshi Hase	Gin no Ame Furu Furu	Yō Hisano	Satoshi Hase
2018	424	Winner	Tenku seyo Hosshō-ji (天駆せよ法勝寺)	Yūgen Yashima	Motoko Arai
2018	424	Second place	Kikai ha Naze Korosu ka	Masaki Nagumo	Motoko Arai
2018	424	Special citation by Nozomi Ohmori	Natsu no Musubime	Hisaki Orito	Motoko Arai
2018	424	Special citation by Sanzō Kusaka	Kanki ni Somare	Kenji Nonaka	Motoko Arai
2018	424	Special citation by Motoko Arai	Adversarial Vipers, Arui ha Saigo no Ginkō Gōtō	Hitozō Takeda	Motoko Arai
2019	511	Winner	Sangita (サンギータ)	Tokio Amasawa	Yūsuke Miyauchi
2019	511	Second place	Inchin Shikatsu (飲鴆止渇)	Sayo Onoda	Yūsuke Miyauchi
2019	511	Special citation by Sanzō Kusaka	"Sakhalin Shakaishugi Kyōwakoku Kindai Shūkyō Shiryō" (2099) Bassui, oyobi Sonota Zakki	Mamoru Tanibayashi	Yūsuke Miyauchi
2019	511	Special citation by Yūsuke Miyauchi	Kaitensuru Dōbutsu no Seishiten	Chiba Shū	Yūsuke Miyauchi

Year	Submissions	Awards	Title	Author(s)	Judges
2020	468	Winner	Ao no Shanghai (蒼の上海)	Matō Oriteru	Akira Hori; Yūsuke Miyauchi; Tetsuya Kohama (Editor)
2020	468	Special citation by Judges	Ōedo Shinguraritei (大江戸しんぐらりてい)	Kazane Yarai	Akira Hori; Yūsuke Miyauchi; Tetsuya Kohama (Editor)
2021	550	Winner	Iteza no Kaoru Natsu (射手座の香る夏)	Rin Matsuki	Akira Hori; Dempow Torishima; Tetsuya Kohama
2021	550	Second place	Kami no Buta (神の豚)	Kumiko Mizobuchi	Akira Hori; Dempow Torishima; Tetsuya Kohama
2022	496	Winner	Kaze ni naruniwa mada (風になるにはまだ)	Chinami Sasahara	Masaki Yamada; Dempow Torishima; Tetsuya Kohama
2023	487	Winner	Ryū to Chinmoku no Ginga (竜と沈黙の銀河)	Toryū Abe	Masaki Yamada (absence due to illness) Iori Miyazawa Tetsuya Kohama

== Published books ==
- Matsuzaki, Yūri (2011). Agari [One Done] あがり (in Japanese). Tokyo Sogensha. ISBN 9784488018146.
- Miyauchi, Yūsuke (2012). Banjō no Yoru [The Night on the Game Board] 盤上の夜 (in Japanese). Tokyo Sogensha. ISBN 9784488018153.
- Torishima, Dempow (2013). Kaikin no To [Sisyphean] 皆勤の徒 (in Japanese). Tokyo Sogensha. ISBN 9784488018177.
- Haneko, Takayama (2014). Udon, Kitsune-tsuki no [Udon, Fox Haunted] うどん キツネつきの (in Japanese). Tokyo Sogensha. ISBN 9784488018191.
- Ishikawa, Muneo (2018). Hanbun Sekai [Halved World] 半分世界 (in Japanese). Tokyo Sogensha. ISBN 9784488018252.
- Takashima, Yūya (2018). Landscape to Natsu no Teiri [Landscape and Summer Theorem] ランドスケープと夏の定理 (in Japanese). Tokyo Sogensha. ISBN 9784488018283.
- Monden, Mitsuhiro (2018). Fūga [Wind Fang] 風牙 (in Japanese). Tokyo Sogensha. ISBN 9784488018290.
- Hisanaga, Mikihiko (2020). 74-Byou no Senritsu to Kodoku [74 Seconds of melody and loneliness] 七十四秒の旋律と孤独. Tokyo Sogensha. ISBN 9784488018429.
- Ohmori, Nozomi; Kusaka, Sanzō; Yamada, Masaki, eds. (2010). Genshoku no Sōzōryoku 原色の想像力 (in Japanese). Tokyo Sogensha. ISBN 9784488739010.
- Ohmori, Nozomi; Kusaka, Sanzō; Hori, Akira, eds. (2012). Genshoku no Sōzōryoku 2 原色の想像力2 (in Japanese). Tokyo Sogensha. ISBN 9784488739027.
