= Uchūjin =

Uchūjin 宇宙塵
- Cover of issue 1, May 1957
- Founder: Takumi Shibano
- Founded: 1957
- First issue: May 1957; 68 years ago
- Final issue Number: September 2013; 204
- Country: Japan
- Language: Japanese

Uchūjin (宇宙塵) was a Japanese science fiction fanzine published from 1957 until its 204th issue in 2013. It was Japan's first science fiction fanzine. It was awarded a special Seiun Award in 1982 as Japan's oldest science fiction fanzine, and received an honorable mention for Best Amateur Magazine at the 1962 Hugo Awards.

== History ==
Uchūjin began publication with the May 1957 issue. Science fiction author and translator Takumi Shibano as the founding editor, making it the oldest Japanese science fiction fanzine. Shibano (under the pseudonym "Kozumi Rei" (小隅黎)) chaired the Science Fiction Writing Club (科学創作クラブ, Kagaku Sōsaku Kurabu) after participating in the Japan Flying Saucer Research Association (日本空飛ぶ円盤研究会, Nihon Soratobu Enban Kenkyūkai).

The club changed its name to Uchūjin before the first issue, and focused on science fiction writing, translation, critique, and related topics. Since the first issue, many of its contributors went on to become well-known speculative fiction writers, including Sakyō Komatsu, Yasutaka Tsutsui, Ryū Mitsuse, Shinji Kajio, Akira Hori, Kōji Tanaka, Yoshinori Shimizu, Baku Yumemakura, and Masaki Yamada.

At the first Nihon SF Taikai in 1962 (which Shibano chaired), Uchūjin held a fifth anniversary party. They also released a self-parody fanzine titled Space Deer (宇宙鹿, Uchū Shishi) in the same year. Three collections of the best works from the magazine were released. The magazine publishing frequency changed from monthly to annual in 1973, with the 200th issue being published in 2007. The final issue contained memorial tributes to Shibano, including an interview with his widow.

== Contributors ==
The following writers contributed to Uchūjin over the years:

- Kazumasa Hirai
- Tadashi Hirose
- Akira Hori
- Shinichi Hoshi
- Fujio Ishihara
- Eisuke Ishikawa
- Norio Itō
- Shinji Kajio
- Ichirō Kanō
- Sakyo Komatsu
- Tadashi Kōsai
- Aran Kyōdomari
- Taku Mayumura
- Hiroshi Minamiyama
- Ryu Mitsuse
- Tsutomu Miyazaki
- Kōsei Ono
- Eiichirō Saitō
- Hakukō Saitō
- Yoshinori Shimizu
- Kōji Tanaka
- Aritsune Toyota
- Yasutaka Tsutsui
- Katsufumi Umehara
- Masaki Yamada
- Tetsu Yano
- Baku Yumemakura

== Best collections ==
Several collections of works from Uchūjin were published in Japan.

- Invitation to Japan's SF Origins: "Uchūjin" Selections (日本SF・原点への招待―「宇宙塵」傑作選, Nihon SF Genten e no Shōtai: "Uchūjin" Kessakusen) series: Volumes 1-3 (May 1977, Kodansha), published for the 20th anniversary of the fanzine
- New "Uchūjin" SF Best Works Selection (新「宇宙塵」SF傑作選, Shin "Uchūjin" SF Kessakusen) series, published for the 30th anniversary of the fanzine
  - Volume 1: Recommendations for the Apocalypse (破局のおすすめ, Hakyoku no Osusume) (December 1987, Kawade Shobō Shinsha, ISBN 4309402062)
  - Volume 2: Whispers of Eternity (無限のささやき, Mugen no Sasayaki) (December 1987, Kawade Shobō Shinsha, ISBN 4309402070)
- The Miracle of Japanese SF: The Best of Uchuujin (日本SFの軌跡 宇宙塵傑作選, Nihon SF no Kiseki: Uchuujin Kessakusen) edited by Takumi Shibano, published for the 40th anniversary of the fanzine
  - Volume 1 (December 1997, Shuppan Geijutsusha, ISBN 4882931478)
  - Volume 2 (December 1997, Shuppan Geijutsusha, ISBN 4882931486)

== Awards and honors ==
Uchūjin has received the following awards and honors:

Year	Organization	Award title, Category	Result	Refs
1962	World Science Fiction Society	Hugo Award, Best Amateur Magazine	Honorable Mention	
1982	日本ファングループ連合会議 (Federation of Science Fiction Fan Groups of Japan)	Seiun Award, Special Award (Japan's oldest fanzine)	Won	
