= Takumi Shibano =

Japanese writer (1926–2010)

- 柴野拓美
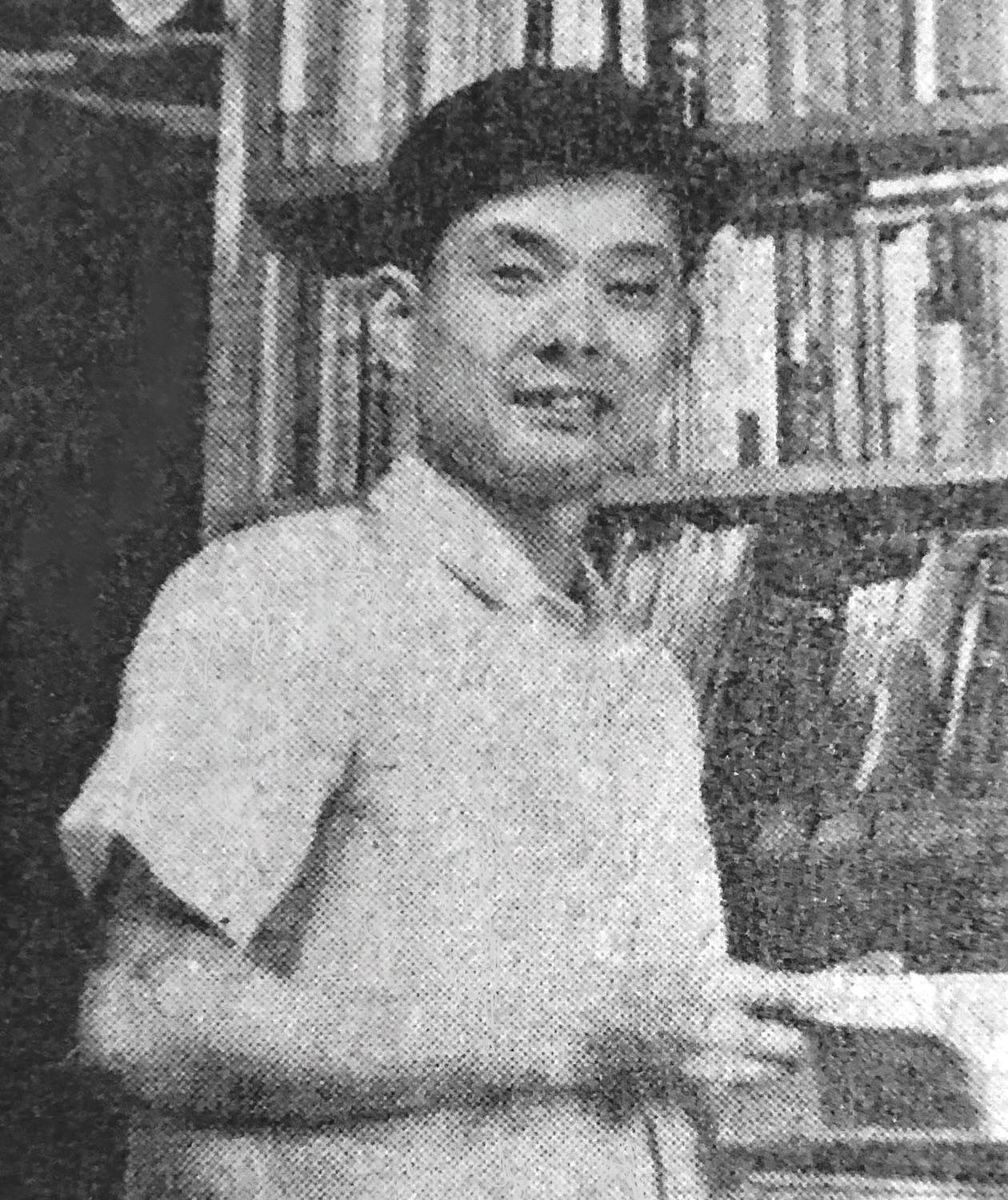
- Born: October 27, 1926; Kanazawa, Ishikawa, Japan
- Died: January 16, 2010 (aged 83); Ōiso, Kanagawa, Japan
- Other name: Rei Kozumi
- Education: Tokyo Institute of Technology
- Occupations: Science fiction translator, author
- Known for: Science fiction aficionado; Founder of fanzine Uchūjin

Takumi Shibano (柴野 拓美, Shibano Takumi; October 27, 1926 – January 16, 2010) was a Japanese science-fiction translator and author. He was a major figure in fandom in Japan and contributed to establishing the Japanese science fiction genre.

A native of Kanazawa, Ishikawa, in 1957 Takumi started Japan's first successful science fiction fanzine Uchūjin initially published monthly; many contributors to the fanzine later became pro, including Shin'ichi Hoshi, Sakyo Komatsu, Ryu Mitsuse and Yasutaka Tsutsui, and formed the first generation of modern Japanese science fiction authors. Shibano was the chair of Japan's first science fiction convention in 1962, as well as the second (1963), fourth (1965) and sixth (1967). He worked on the formation of the Federation of SF Fan Groups of Japan, founded in 1965, and served as its chair from 1966 through 1970.

After leaving his job as a high-school mathematics teacher in 1977, he became a full-time writer and translator. Under the pen-name Rei Kozumi (小隅 黎, Kozumi Rei), a play on "cosmic ray," he translated as many as sixty science fiction novels from English into Japanese, including E. E. Smith's Lensman series and Larry Niven's Known Space series.

Also as Rei Kozumi, he wrote three children's books, Superhuman ‘Plus X’ (1969), Operation Moonjet (1969), and Revolt in North Pole City (1977), and was also principal author of The World of Popular Literature (1978).

In 1968 a fan fund paid for him to attend Worldcon for the first time, and after 1979 he attended most of the Worldcons and served as the presenter of the Seiun Award. He received the E. E. Evans Big Heart Award in 1986 and a Worldcon Special Award at the 51st World Science Fiction Convention in 1993. He was the Fan Guest of Honor of the 54th World Science Fiction Convention in 1996 and the 65th World Science Fiction Convention in 2007.

Nihon SF Taisho Award Special Prize, Seiun Award Special Prize, Tokyo Anime Award Award of Merit were awarded posthumously for his lifetime achievement.
