= Wombs (manga) =

Japanese manga series

- First volume cover
- Genre: Science fiction
- Manga
- Written by: Yumiko Shirai
- Published by: Shogakukan
- Imprint: Ikki Comix
- Magazine: Monthly Ikki; (April 25, 2009 – October 25, 2010)
- Original run: April 25, 2009 – January 29, 2016
- Volumes: 5
- icon

Wombs (stylized in all caps) is a Japanese manga series written and illustrated by Yumiko Shirai. It was serialized in Shogakukan's seinen manga magazine Monthly Ikki from April 2009 to October 2010 and later directly published via tankōbon volumes, with the fifth and last one released in January 2016.

In 2016, Wombs won the Grand Prize of the 37th Nihon SF Taisho Award.

== Synopsis ==
On the planet of Hekiou, there is a continuing war between the first wave of immigrants and the second. An important section of the military uses a native creature, the Niebass, to give its soldiers translocation abilities. These soldiers are all women, with the alien creature transplanted into their wombs. Some people see this practice as a violation of human women by aliens, and Mana Oga's boyfriend has a similar perspective on the matter. Mana Oga is a new soldier in this section, and the story follows her and the other women in her group who accept the alien creatures into their wombs in order to defend their homes.

== Publication ==
Wombs, written and illustrated by Yumiko Shirai, debuted in Shogakukan's seinen manga magazine Monthly Ikki on April 25, 2009. The series was regularly published in the magazine for sixteen chapters until October 25, 2010, and it was then directly released via tankōbon volumes, although the first chapter of the third volume was published by the magazine in advance on April 25, 2012. The five tankōbon volumes of Wombs were released from January 29, 2010, to January 29, 2016.

=== Volumes ===
No.	Release date	ISBN
1	January 29, 2010	978-4-09-188494-7
2	January 28, 2011	978-4-09-188539-5
3	April 27, 2012	978-4-09-188318-6
4	June 28, 2013	978-4-09-188626-2
5	January 29, 2016	978-4-09-188687-3

== Reception ==
Wombs was one of the Jury Recommended Works at the 14th Japan Media Arts Festival in 2010. The series won the 37th Nihon SF Taisho Award by the Science Fiction and Fantasy Writers of Japan (SFWJ). The manga was nominated for the 48th Seiun Award in the Best Comic category in 2017. The manga was nominated for the Grand Prize of the 12th and 16th Sense of Gender Award in 2012 and 2016, respectively.

== See also ==
- Tenken, another manga by the same author
