= Tokyo Sogensha =

Japanese publisher that spun-off from Sōgensha in 1948

Tokyo Sogensha (東京創元社, Tokyo Sōgensha)
- Status: Active
- Founded: February 1948 (spin-off); July 16, 1954 (official)
- Country of origin: Japan
- Headquarters location: Shinjuku, Tokyo, Japan
- Publication types: Books
- Fiction genres: Mystery, Science fiction, Fantasy, Horror, Social science
- Imprints: Sōgen Suiri Bunko (Mystery, Fantasy, horror); Sōgen SF Bunko (SF)
- No. of employees: 47 (as of March 2022)
- Official website: www.tsogen.co.jp

Tokyo Sogensha Co., Ltd. (東京創元社, Tokyo Sōgensha) is a Japanese publisher of mystery fiction, science fiction, fantasy, literary fiction and social science, based in Tokyo.

== History ==
In 1925, a publisher called Sogensha Inc. (創元社, Sōgensha) of Osaka was established with a branch in Tokyo.

In 1948, the Tokyo branch of Sogensha spun off into a separate company with the same name, Sogensha.

In 1954, Sogensha (Tokyo) was officially reorganized into Tokyo Sogensha Co., Ltd.

Between 1962 and 1970, Tokyo Sogensha changed its name to Tokyo Sogen Shinsha (東京創元新社, "shinsha" means "the new company") due to its reconstruction from bankruptcy.

Both Tokyo Sogensha Co., Ltd. and Sogensha Inc. exist as unrelated publishing companies.

In 2013, the official mascot cat named Kurari was released. Kurari's name is from Japanese kanji so (創) of Sogensha. So (創) can be divided to kanji kura (倉) and katakana ri (リ).

== Imprints ==
- Sogen Mystery Bunko (創元推理文庫, Sogen Suiri Bunko) Started in 1959. It is one of the leading Bunkobon (small-format paperback) labels focusing on mystery, science fiction, fantasy, and horror. The label had specialized in translation until 1984 then the company started publishing Japanese works.
- Sogen SF Bunko (創元SF文庫, Sogen SF Bunko) See below.
- Sogen Library (創元ライブラリ, Sogen Library) Started in 1995
- Magazines
  - Sogen Mystery (創元推理, Sogen Suiri) 1992-2000
  - Sogen Mystery 21 (創元推理21, Sogen Suiri 21) 2001-2003
  - Mysteries! (ミステリーズ!, Misteries!) 2003-2021
  - Bookworm's Note (紙魚の手帖, Shimi no Techō) 2021-

== Science fiction ==
As a science fiction publisher, Tokyo Sogensha began with the translation of Fredric Brown's works as a division of Sōgen Suiri Bunko in 1963. The division and its continuation, which was renamed as Sōgen SF Bunko in 1991, are Japan's oldest existing Sci-Fi bunkobon label. It published 677 books as of 2015 including the works of Arthur C. Clarke, Isaac Asimov, Robert A. Heinlein, Ray Bradbury, J. G. Ballard, Philip K. Dick, Lois McMaster Bujold, Vernor Vinge, James P. Hogan, Kim Stanley Robinson, Robert Charles Wilson, and Greg Egan. It scored early success in the post-war period with the Barsoom books of Edgar Rice Burroughs and the words of E. E. Smith.

Sogen SF Bunko had specialized in translation until 2007 then it started publishing Japanese works. The first Japanese titles were reprints of Legend of Galactic Heroes #1 by Yoshiki Tanaka and Babylonia Wave by Akira Hori.

=== Recognition ===
Tokyo Sogensha won the Seiun Award for Best Translated Long Work for 18 works out of 52 times (as of 2021); the Nihon SF Taisho Award in 2012, 2013 and 2019 for Japanese Works.

== Horror/Fantasy ==
Notable authors published by Tokyo Sogensha include Shirley Jackson, H. P. Lovecraft and Edgar Allan Poe.

== Prizes ==
Tokyo Sogensha awards some prizes for unpublished Japanese works to recruit new writers of specific genres:

- Ayukawa Tetsuya Award (鮎川哲也賞, Ayukawa Tetsuya Shō) - Started in 1990. An annual contest for mystery fiction, named after Tetsuya Ayukawa, a notable novelist of the genre.
- Mysteries! Prize for New Writers (ミステリーズ!新人賞, Misuteriizu! Shinjin Shō) - Started in 2004. The short story counterpart of the Tetsuya Ayukawa Award, named after the bimonthly magazine the company published. It was the continuation of the Sogen Suiri Prize for New Writers (1994-2003).
- Sogen SF Short Story Prize (創元SF短編賞, Sōgen SF Tanpen Shō) - Since 2010. An annual contest for broad-sense science fiction and speculative fiction short stories.
- Sogen Fantasy Prize for New Writers (創元ファンタジイ新人賞, Sōgen Fantasy Shinjin Shō) - 2014-2020 (5 times). A contest for fantasy novels.
