= Shunrō Oshikawa =

Japanese writer and journalist

- 押川春浪
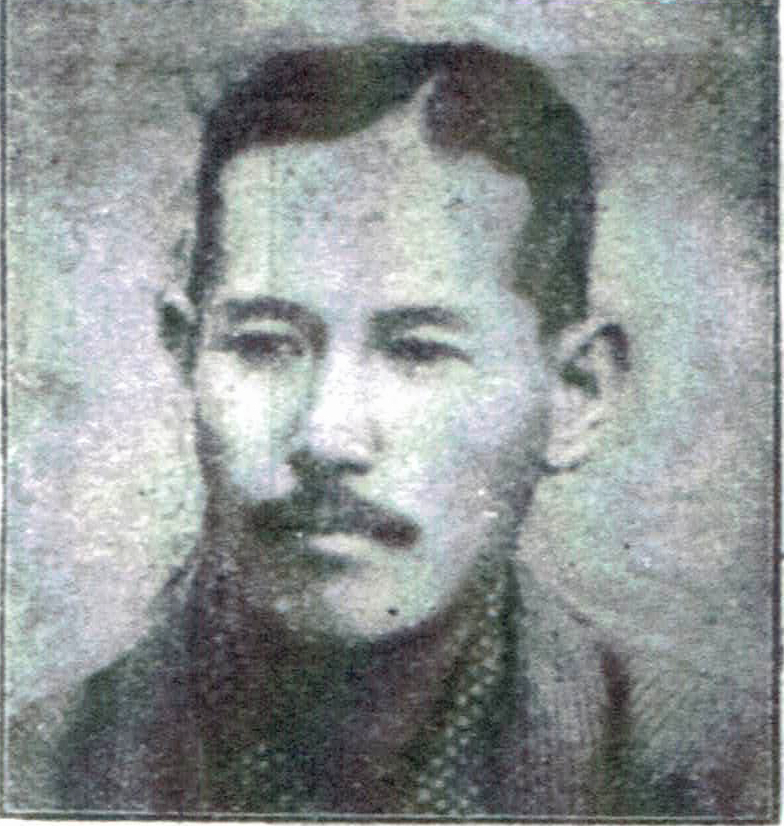
- Oshikawa in 1914, a few months prior to his death
- Born: 押川方存 (Oshikawa Masaari); March 21, 1876; Matsuyama, Ehime Prefecture, Japan
- Died: November 16, 1914 (aged 38); Tabata, Takinogawa-ku, Kita-Toshima-gun, Tokyo Prefecture, Japan
- Education: Tōkyō Senmon Gakkō
- Occupations: Writer; Journalist; Editor
- Writing career
- Years active: 1900–1914

Shunrō Oshikawa (押川 春浪, Oshikawa Shunrō; real name 押川 方存 Oshikawa Masaari; March 21, 1876 – November 16, 1914) was a Japanese author, journalist and editor, best known as a pioneer of science fiction.

== Education and early career ==
While studying law at Tōkyō Senmon Gakkō (present day Waseda University) at the turn of the century, Oshikawa published Kaitō Bōken Kidan: Kaitei Gunkan (海島冒険奇譚 海底軍艦 lit. "Undersea Warship: A Fantastic Tale of Island Adventure"), the story of an armoured, ram-armed submarine in a future history of war between Japan and Russia.

The novel reflects the tensions existing between Japan and Russia at the time, and foreshadowed the Russo-Japanese War that followed in 1904.

Oshikawa's father was Masayoshi Oshikawa, evangelist, political activist and founder and first president of Tohoku Gakuin University and his brother was Kiyoshi Oshikawa, founder of the first professional baseball team in Japan. While at Waseda, Oshikawa played on the baseball team under Abe Isoo, along with his brother. He wrote a prologue for a baseball technique book that came from this trip, discussing how baseball should be considered the same as bushidō in spirit. He was a member of the Waseda team that in 1905 traveled to the U.S. to play American teams, the first time for Japanese baseball.

== Influences and later works ==
Like other early science fiction writers of the period, he was influenced by the stories of Jules Verne, whose technological adventure novels had become popular in translation in the rapidly modernising Meiji era Japan. Specifically, the above-mentioned speculative conception of submarine warfare, based on ramming and making no mention of torpedoes, is shared with Verne (see "Facing the Flag", "HMS Sword").

Later, Kaitei gunkan became the first in a wildly successful, six-volume series set in the Pacific and Indian Oceans: Bukyō no Nippon (武侠の日本 lit. Heroic Japan, 1902), Shinzō Gunkan (新造軍艦 lit. The Newly Built Battleship, 1904), Bukyō Kantai (武侠艦隊 lit. Heroic Armada, 1904), Shin Nippontō (新日本島 lit. New Japan Isle, 1906), and Tōyō Bukyō Dan (東洋武侠団 lit. East Asian Heroic Troupe, 1907). The books remained in print for many years and later got much additional attention through a successful film adaptation.

Oshikawa was enthusiastic about sports, especially baseball, and famously clashed with Inazō Nitobe (one of the main proponents of the baseball considered harmful argument).

He has also contributed to the development of the Japanese detective fiction. Some of his stories incorporated elements of ratiocination, sleuthing, mystery and crime within stories of adventure, intrigue, the bizarre and the grotesque – though in his time this did not yet become a distinct genre on its own.

In the detailed list compiled by "The Victorian Bookshelf" project of "Confluence 2000," tracing the early development of "The Scientific Romance and other Related Works", Oshikawa Shunrō is the only non-Western author mentioned for the pre-1900 period.

However, all the above is inextricably mixed with Oshikawa's share in and responsibility for helping to perpetuate in Japanese popular culture – especially through works greatly influencing children and youths which remained in print for many decades after his own time – themes of Japanese nationalism and patriotism, some which can be considered to promote militarism and imperialism as well.

As noted by Jeffrey M. Angles in his 2003 Ohio State University dissertation on Japanese popular authors in the early Twentieth Century, Shunro is best remembered in Japan for his important role in developing adventure tales into an independent genre of children's fiction.

Oshikawa entered the publishing company Hakubunkan at the introduction of the author Iwaya Sazanami (1870–1933) and served as a lead reporter for Shaijitsu Gahō (写実画報 lit. Graphic Pictorial), a magazine that featured stories and photos about the Russo-Japanese War of 1904. This magazine ceased publication in 1907, but Oshikawa became co-editor of another Hakubunkan magazine, Bōken sekai (冒険世界 lit. World of Adventure).

During and following the war with Russia there was a strong patriotic wave in Japan, and – though their country had won a decisive victory over the Russians and capitalized upon it to annex Korea – some Japanese were left feeling dissatisfied with the war's achievements. An earlier magazine – Tanken Sekai (探検世界 lit. World of Exploration), published by Hakubunkan's competitor Seikōzasshisha (成功雑誌社) – catered to those wishing to read tales of Japanese adventure and exploration abroad and fantasies of imperialistic superiority and Japanese valor, in which fiction was mixed with more or less factual accounts of exploration, record-breaking achievements and "unusual customs" from around the world.

Hakubunkan's "Bōken sekai" (冒険世界), which Oshikawa co-edited, was – as clearly shown by researcher Kawataro Nakajima – designed to appeal to the same kind of public, which had shown itself attracted to tales of military adventure and heroism. "Bōken Sekai" often contained allegedly true stories of adventure, exploration, military prowess and accounts of "primitive" lands, all of which reflected Japanese nationalism and imperial ambitions. At the same time, however, it also published mysteries, including translations of Western Detective Stories, as well as ghost stories. Virtually every issue of the magazine included a story or article by Oshikawa himself.

After a dispute with his publisher, Oshikawa left Hakubunkan. In October 1911 he founded the magazine "Bukyō Sekai" (武侠世界 lit. World of Heroism) with the capital of an entrepreneur named Yanaginuma Kensuke, whose publishing house (Bukyō Sekaisha, later Bukyōsha) concentrated at the time on books of adventure, sports and physical activity for young people. Oshikawa's new monthly magazine, which he edited until his death, strongly resembled his earlier one, and it too carried tales of exploration, non-fictional adventure stories, editorials, sports-related tales, and translations of mysteries.

On August 6, 1914, Oshikawa was accompanied by several of the magazine's editors, contributors, illustrators and fans on an outing to a lakeshore in the northern part of the Kantō region. Possibly because of his death shortly afterwards, that outing seemed to be long remembered by and influence the later work of participants such as the artist Kosugi Misei who had illustrated many of Oshikawa's stories and followed him from his earlier magazine to the later one.

Oshikawa's works were never translated in any significant way to Western languages, leaving his literary influence limited mainly to Japan itself. However, the many loose film adaptations of his books, starting in the 1960s, did gain a considerable audience in America and Europe, such as Kaitei Gunkan (1963, released in the US as Atragon) – an adaptation which came to be considered "a Classic of Science Fiction Films" – and Shin Kaitei Gunkan (1996 and 1998, released in the US as Super Atragon).

The film versions were considerably different from the original, both due to the addition of Science Fiction and Fantasy elements such as a kaiju and because the handling of Oshikawa's nationalist themes was influenced by Japan's American-enforced transformation into a secular and pacifistic culture after the Surrender of Japan.

The "Bukyō Sekai" magazine survived its founder and continued publication after Oshikawa's death, until 1923.

The book Kaidanji: Oshikawa Shunrō, by Jun'ya Yokota and Shingo Aizu, won the Nihon SF Taisho Award for 1988.

== See also ==
- Japanese literature
- Russo-Japanese War
- Invasion literature
