= Shajitsu Gahō =

Shajitsu Gahō (写実画報, Shajitsu Gahō, "Graphic Pictorial") was a Japanese magazine of the early 20th century, published by the Hakubunkan publishing company. It featured stories and photos about the Russo-Japanese War of 1905. Shunrō Oshikawa was its lead reporter. The magazine ceased publication in 1907.
