= Gorō Masaki =

Japanese science fiction writer (born 1957)

- Born: 1957 (age 68–69); Kanagawa, Japan
- Writing career
- Genre: Science fiction
- Notable awards: 1993 Nihon SF Taisho Award; 1993 Seiun Award

Gorō Masaki (柾 悟郎, Masaki Gorō; born 1957 in Kanagawa Prefecture) is a Japanese science fiction writer whose career began in 1986. His most famous work is Venus City(ヴィーナス・シティ, 1992). In 1993, he won the Seiun Award for Japanese novel. He also won the 1993 Nihon SF Taisho Award.

== Bibliography ==
- Evil Eyes (1988)
- Ichiban Ue no Oniichan (1989)
- Venus City (1992)
- Tekusuto no Chiseigaku (1994)
- Shadow Orchid (2002)
