= Tetsuya Ayukawa =

Japanese mystery writer (1919–2002)

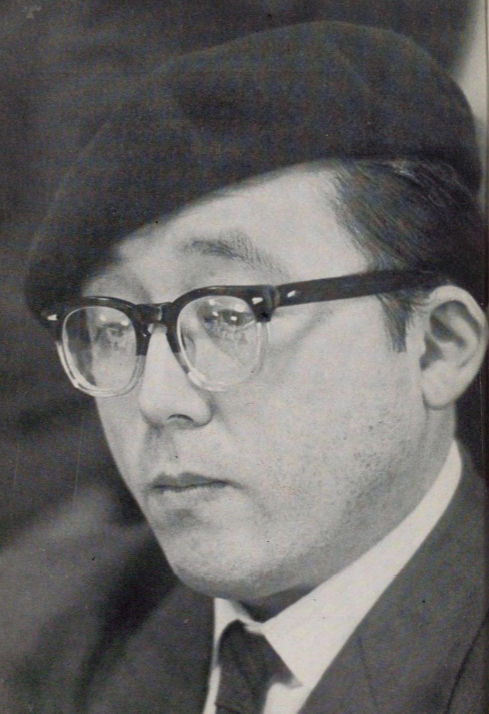
- Born: Toru Nakagawa; 14 February 1919; Tokyo, Japan
- Died: 24 September 2002 (aged 83)
- Occupation: Writer
- Writing career
- Genre: Mystery
- Notable work: Detective Onitsura Series

Toru Nakagawa (February 14, 1919 – September 24, 2002), known by his pen name Tetsuya Ayukawa (鮎川 哲也, Ayukawa Tetsuya), was a Japanese literary critic and novelist. He is noted for his Detective Onitsura Series of mystery stories.

== Biography ==
Ayukawa was born in the Sugamo neighborhood of Tokyo. His father was a surveyor employed by the South Manchurian Railway. When Ayukawa was in the third year of elementary school, the family relocated to Dalian in the Kwantung Leased Territory where he completed middle school. He returned to Tokyo intending to enter a music conservatory, but was forced to return to Manchuria due to an attack of pleurisy. In 1938, he was admitted to the Takushoku University's School of Commerce, but his education was interrupted by frequent illness. During this time, he began reading detective novels, and was especially a fan of Freeman Wills Crofts, whose stories often had a railway theme, typically with an apparently unbreakable alibi focused on the intricacies of railway timetables. In 1944, due to his father's retirement, the family moved back to Tokyo, but was forced to evacuate to Kumamoto Prefecture to escape the Tokyo air raids of World War II.

In 1946, he returned to Tokyo and obtained a clerical job with the American occupation HQ. Shortly afterwards, he began his literary career by publishing short stories and articles in magazines under a large number of pen names. His debut novel under the name of Tetsuya Ayukawa was The Petrov Case about a rich Russian émigré's death in Dalian, which won a one-million yen prize in a contest run by the magazine Jewel in 1949. Ayukawa first wrote the manuscript while a student in Manchukuo; it was lost during the war, and he re-wrote the story for the contest. However, due to issues with the publisher, the novel was not actually published until 1956. His second novel, Kuroi Toranku ("Black Trunk", 1956), published by Kodansha, introduced the character of Inspector Onitsura, who would later reappear in many of Ayukawa's novels. In 1955, he also began writing a number of series of mystery novels for the juvenile audience.

In 1960, Ayukawa was awarded the Mystery Writers of Japan Award for Shiroi Kaseki ("White Fossil") and Kuroi Hakucho ("Black Swan"). He is noted for his Detective Onitsura Series of mystery stories.

In 1972, he launched another mystery series, in which the protagonist is an amateur detective who is also a bartender in the Ginza district of Tokyo.

In 1990, the publisher Tokyo Sogensha established the Ayukawa Tetsuya Award, a literary award for new mystery authors.

In 2001, Ayukawa was awarded the Honkaku Mystery Award for Lifetime Achievement.

After his death in Kamakura 2002, he was posthumously awarded the Japan Mystery Literature Award.

== Partial bibliography ==
- The Petrov Case, 1950
- The Black Trunk (黒いトランク, Kuroi Toranku), 1956
- The Black Swan Mystery, 1959; English translation by Bryan Karetnyk, 2025
- Semi-Express Nagara (準急ながら, Junkyū Nagara), 1966
