= Petrov Case =

Japanese edition

The Petrov Case (ペトロフ事件, Petorofu jiken) is a 1950 mystery by the Japanese novelist, Tetsuya Ayukawa. It is Ayukawa’s debut novel, and is based on memories and experiences from Ayukawa’s childhood in Manchuria. The story was the first in series of novels featuring the protagonist, Detective Onitsura.

== Story outline ==
Set in Manchukuo before World War II, Detective Onitsura, formerly of the Tokyo Metropolitan Police is assigned to Harbin, which has a large cosmopolitan population creating unique problems and difficulties for the police. He then must travel to Dalian, to investigate the murder of a rich Russian émigré at a summer home near Ganjungzi in the Kwantung Leased Territory. His investigations take him to Port Arthur, and back to Harbin on the Asia Express, an express train on the South Manchurian Railway. Along the way, he must solve the case by overcoming the suspects' false alibis. The climax of the story is set on an island in the Songhua River.

== Main characters ==
- Ivan Petrov - a rich White Russian émigré
- Anton Petrov - Ivan's nephew
- Guo Yunhuan - Anton's fiancé
- Nikolai Petrov - also Ivan's nephew
- Alexander Petrov - also Ivan's nephew
- Natalia Bacour - Alexander's fiancé
- Detective Onitsura - a Dalian Police detective, on assignment from Tokyo Metropolitan Police Department
- Detective Sayabin - a Harbin Police detective

== Awards ==
The novel won a contest sponsored in 1949 by the popular mystery magazine Hoseki (“Jewel”) with a grand prize of one million yen to mark its third anniversary of publication.

== See also ==
- Freeman Wills Crofts
