= Kaidanji: Oshikawa Shunrō =

1987 book by Jun'ya Yokota and Shingo Aizu

Kaidanji Oshikawa Shunrō Nihon SF no Oya
- Authors: Jun'ya Yokota; Shingo Aizu
- Original title: 快男児押川春浪―日本SFの祖
- Language: Japanese
- Subject: Shunro Oshikawa
- Genre: Biography
- Publisher: Pan Research Institute, Tokuma Shoten
- Publication date: December 1987
- Publication place: Japan
- Media type: Print
- Pages: 335
- Awards: Nihon SF Taisho Award (1988)
- ISBN: 4893520229

Kaidanji Oshikawa Shunrō: Nihon SF no Oya (快男児押川春浪―日本SFの祖; lit. Nice Guy Shunrō Oshikawa: The Father of Japanese SF) is a 1987 Japanese book by Jun'ya Yokota and Shingo Aizu about Shunro Oshikawa, the early twentieth century pioneer of Japanese science fiction. The book won the 1988 Nihon SF Taisho Award.

== Publication history ==
- Kaidanji Oshikawa Shunrō: Nihon SF no Oya (快男児押川春浪―日本SFの祖) with Shingo Aizu (December 1987, Pan Research Institute, ISBN 4893520229)
- Kaidanji Oshikawa Shunrō (快男児押川春浪) with Shingo Aizu (April 1991, Tokuma Shoten, ISBN 4195793211)

== Awards and honors ==
Kaidanji Oshikawa Shunrō: Nihon SF no Oya received the following awards and honors:

Year	Organization	Award title, Category	Result	Refs
1988	Federation of Science Fiction Fan Groups of Japan	Seiun Award, Best Nonfiction	Nominated	
1988	Science Fiction and Fantasy Writers of Japan	Nihon SF Taisho Award	Won	
