= Haneko Takayama =

Japanese writer

- 高山 羽根子
- Born: 1975 (age 50–51); Toyama, Japan
- Education: Tama Art University
- Occupation: Writer
- Writing career
- Language: Japanese
- Genres: Science fiction; Short story
- Notable works: Udon, Kitsune-tsuki no; Ita basho
- Notable awards: Akutagawa Prize; Fumiko Hayashi Literary Prize

Haneko Takayama (高山 羽根子, Takayama Haneko; born 1975) is a Japanese writer. She has won the Akutagawa Prize and the Fumiko Hayashi Literary Prize, and her work has been nominated for the Nihon SF Taisho Award.

== Biography ==
Haneko Takayama was born in 1975 in Toyama, Japan, and graduated from Tama Art University. She made her literary debut with her science fiction story Udon, Kitsune-tsuki no (うどんキツネつきの), which received the first honorable mention at the inaugural Sogen SF Short Story Prize awards in 2010 and was then published in an anthology of the prize nominees. Udon, Kitsune-tsuki no was later reprinted as the title story of a 2014 collection of Takayama's short stories, which was a finalist for the 36th Nihon SF Taisho Award.

Two years later Takayama received the 2nd Fumiko Hayashi Literary Prize for The Island on the Side of the Sun (太陽の側の島), a story of a woman and a soldier during wartime told in a series of fictional diary entries and letters. In addition to ¥1 million in cash, the prize included publication of the story in the mid-April issue of Fujin Kōron.

In 2018 her short story collection Objectum (オブジェクタム, Obujekutamu), with a title story about a man visiting his hometown and dealing with his memories, was published by Asahi Shimbun. The collection also included the previously published story The Island on the Side of the Sun. Reviewer Tetsuo Machiguchi, writing in book review journal Dokushojin, praised Takayama as an "extraordinary writer" who "crosses genre boundaries". Objectum was subsequently named as a finalist for the 39th Nihon SF Taisho Award.

Later that year her story Ita basho (居た場所, Where I was) was published in Bungei, with critic Atsushi Sasaki of the Nishinippon Shimbun calling it an "unmistakable masterpiece". Ita basho was subsequently nominated for the 160th Akutagawa Prize. It survived the first round of selection committee voting, with committee members praising the atmosphere created in the book, but the committee ultimately concluded that some of the fantasy elements were unsatisfying, and awarded the prize to two other authors. Six months later, Takayama's story Come Gather Round, People (カム・ギャザー・ラウンド・ピープル, Kamu gyazā raundo pīpuru), published in the May issue of Subaru, was nominated for the 161st Akutagawa Prize.

Takayama won the 163rd Akutagawa Prize for her work Shuri no uma (首里の馬, A Horse from Shuri), a novel inspired by her travels to Okinawa. Shuri no uma follows a museum archivist in Okinawa and her response to seeing a type of horse native to the island. The novel was also nominated for the Yukio Mishima Prize.

== Recognition ==
- 2016: 2nd Fumiko Hayashi Literary Prize
- 2020: 163rd Akutagawa Prize

== Selected works ==
- Udon, Kitsune-tsuki no (うどんキツネつきの), Tōkyō Sōgensha, 2014, ISBN 9784488018191
- Objectum (オブジェクタム, Obujekutamu), Asahi Shimbun, 2018, ISBN 9784022515643
- Shuri no uma (首里の馬), Shinchosha, 2020, ISBN 9784103533818
