= Fujio Ishihara =

- Born: April 1, 1933 (age 93); Tokyo, Japan
- Education: Waseda University
- Writing career
- Genre: Science fiction
- Notable awards: 1985 Seiun Award for Kōseiki no Sekai; 1991 Nihon SF Taisho Award special award

Fujio Ishihara (石原藤夫, Ishihara Fujio; born in Tokyo in 1933) is a former professor of electronics at Tamagawa University, and a Japanese science fiction author.

He graduated Waseda University with a degree in electronics.

He made his science fiction debut in 1965. During the 1970s and 1980s he has been an active hard SF advocate. In the first half of the 1980s, he coined the term "Kōseiki Sekai" (光世紀世界, Light Century Universe), defined as the sphere with a diameter of 100 light years (within 50 light years radius from the Sun). He also edited Kōseiki Seihyō (光世紀星表, Light Century Catalogue), the star catalogue of Light Century Universe (738 stars had been known at the time, include the Sun). Also he is known for bibliographies of Japanese science fiction.

He received the Seiun Award best non-fiction book in 1985 for Kōseiki no Sekai, and Nihon SF Taisho Award special award in 1991 for his bibliography works.

== Works ==
=== Fiction ===
- Planet series
  - Haiuei wakusei (ハイウェイ惑星 Highway Planet) (1967)
  - Sutorarudoburugu wakusei (ストラルドブルグ惑星 Straldburg Planet) (1975)
  - Burakkuhōru wakusei (ブラックホール惑星 Blackhole Planet) (1979)
  - Taimumashin wakusei (タイムマシン惑星 Time Machine Planet) (1981)
  - Antena wakusei (アンテナ惑星 Antenna Planet) (1982)
- Gazō bunmei (画像文明 Pictorial Civilization) (1968)
- Ikiteiru umi (生きている海 Living Sea) (1970)
- Konpyūtā ga shinda hi (コンピュタが死んだ日 The Day Computers Died) (1972)
- Randau no genshisei—Kōseiki patorōru (ランダウの幻視星—光世紀パトロール・シリーズ) (1981)
- Uchūsen Oromorufugō no bōken (宇宙船オロモルフ号の冒険 The Voyage of the Spaceship Holomorph) (1982)

=== Non-fiction ===
- Kōseiki no Sekai (光世紀の世界 Light Century World) (1984; revised 1985)
- Ginga ryokō to tokushu soutaisei riron (銀河旅行と特殊相対性理論 Galactic Travel and the Special Theory of Relativity) (1984)
- Ginga ryokō to ippan soutaisei riron (銀河旅行と一般相対性理論 Galactic Travel and the General Theory of Relativity) (1986)
- Kidō erebētā (軌道エレベータ Orbital Elevator) (co-written with Ryūichi Kaneko) (Shōkabō, 1997; revised, Hayakawa Shobō, 2009)

=== Bibliographic works ===
Index to SF Magazine

- S-F magajin indekkusu 1–100 (「S-Fマガジン」インデックス (1–100) Index to "S-F Magazine" 1–100) (1967; supplemented 1968; revised 1980)
- S-F magajin indekkusu 101–170 (「S-Fマガジン」インデックス (101–170)) (1973)
- S-F magajin indekkusu 101–200 (「S-Fマガジン」インデックス (101–200)) (1981)
- S-F magajin indekkusu 201–300 fikushon hen (「S-Fマガジン」インデックス 201–300 フィクション篇) (1985)

SF Grand Annotated Catalogue

- S-F tosho kaisetsu sōmokuroku shōwa 20nen 9gatsu - shōwa 43nen 8gatsu (S-F図書解説総目録 昭和20年9月ー昭和43年8月 SF Grand Annotated Catalogue September 1945 - August 1968) (1969; revised 1970)
- Zoku S-F tosho kaisetsu sōmokuroku shōwa 43nen 9gatsu – shōwa 46nen 3gatsu (S-F図書解説総目録 昭和43年9月–46年3月) (1971)
- S-F tosho kaisetsu sōmokuroku (1946-1970) zōho kaiteiban jō (S-F図書解説総目録(1946-1970)増補改定版 上) (1982)
- S-F tosho kaisetsu sōmokuroku (1971-1980) jō (S-F図書解説総目録 1971-1980 上) (1989)
- S-F tosho kaisetsu sōmokuroku (1971-1980) ge (S-F図書解説総目録 1971-1980 下) (1991)
- S-F tosho kaisetsu sōmokuroku (1946-1970) zōho kaiteiban ge (S-F図書解説総目録(1946-1970)増補改定版 下) (1996)
