= Tanken sekai (magazine) =

Early 20th century Japanese magazine

Tanken sekai (World of Exploration) was a Japanese magazine of the early twentieth century, published by the Seikosha publishing house which was part of the still-extant Seiko empire. The magazine is considered to have both reflected and amplified the strong wave of patriotism which was felt in the Japanese society during and following the Russo-Japanese War of 1905.

== History and profile ==
Tanken sekai was first published by Seikosha in May 1906. The magazine catered to a readership which was interested in "tales of Japanese adventure and exploration abroad and fantasies of imperialistic superiority and Japanese valor", as Jeffrey M. Angles, researcher of Japanese popular culture, put it. On its pages, fiction was mixed with more or less factual accounts of exploration, record-breaking achievements and "unusual customs" from around the world.

As researcher Kawataro Nakajima has shown, the magazine's success inspired the appearance of rival magazines of the same kind, such as Boken sekai, published by Seikosha's rival publishing company Hakubunkan.
