= Yumiko Shirai =

Japanese manga artist

- Born: March 15, 1967; Ehime Prefecture, Japan
- Occupation: Manga artist
- Writing career
- Language: Japanese
- Period: 21st century
- Genres: Feminist, science fiction
- Notable work: Wombs
- Notable awards: Nihon SF Taisho Award
- Website: yumikoubou.com

Yumiko Shirai (Japanese: 白井弓子; born March 15, 1967) is a Japanese manga artist. She is best known for her manga Wombs, winner of the 2017 Nihon SF Taisho Award.

== Biography ==
Born in Ehime Prefecture, Yumiko Shirai is a graduate of the Kyoto City University of Arts and the Oil Painting Department of the Faculty of Fine Arts.

In 2007 her manga Tenken, published as a doujinshi (self-publication), won the encouragement award in the manga category at the 11th Japan Media Arts Festival. It was then published as a magazine by Sanctuary Publishing in 2008.

From 2009 onwards Yumiko Shirai created the manga Wombs, published as a monthly series in the pre-publication magazine Monthly Ikki by Shogakukan. Following the magazine's demise, Wombs continued to be published online, and the author took five years to deliver the fifth and final volume. In 2010, Wombs was included in the jury selection for the 14th Japan Media Arts Festival in the maga category.

From 2013 to 2015 she published a new series, Rafnas, in the magazine Monthly Action from Futabasha, which was in turn part of the jury's selection for the manga category.

In 2017 Wombs was awarded the 37th Nihon SF Taisho Award joining the exclusive club of manga to have received this prize, which rewards a work of SF from all the arts.

In 2017 Yumiko Shirai became a member of the Science Fiction and Fantasy Writers of Japan.

In 2020, Yumiko Shirai began publishing a series entitled Wombs Cradle, a prequel to Wombs, which was published on publisher Futabasha's pre-publication website.

In 2021 the Wombs series was translated and published in French by Akata and was met with a positive reception, with critics noting that the manga renewed the themes of science fiction.

== Techniques and influences ==
Yumiko Shirai creates her sketches on paper before finalising them using graphics software such as Painter, Photoshop and Clip Studio Paint. Shirai said she was influenced by Yoshikazu Yasuhiko's manga Arion, but also by authors such as Moto Hagio, Yumiko Oshima and Mutsumi Hagiiwa.

== Awards ==
- 2007: encouragement in the manga category at the 11th Japan Media Arts Festival for Tenkensai.
- 2010: jury selection in the manga category of the 14th Japan Media Arts Festival for Wombs.
- 2015: jury selection in the manga category of the 19th Japan Media Arts Festival for Rafnas.
- 2017: 37th Nihon SF Taisho Award for Wombs.
- 2017: Ehime culture award for Love Face.

== Works ==
=== Books ===
- « Tenken Festival » (Éditions Sanctuaire, 30 juillet 2008,ISBN 978-4-86113-921-5)
- Wombs, Shogakukan, Ikki Comix, 5 volumes in total
  1. 2010,ISBN 978-4-09-188494-7
  2. 2011,ISBN 978-4-09-188539-5
  3. 2012,ISBN 978-4-09-188583-8
  4. 2013,ISBN 978-4-09-188626-2
  5. 2016,ISBN 978-4-09-188687-3
- Yumiko Shirai Early Shorts, Shogakukan, Ikki Comix, 2010,ISBN 978-4-09-179107-8
- Rafnas, Futabasha, Action Comics, 2 volumes in total
  1. 2014 ISBN 978-4-575-84466-5
  2. 2015 ISBN 978-4-575-84589-1
- Lune de miel d'Iwa et Niki, Akita Shoten, Bonita Comics, 2017,ISBN 978-4-253-26068-8
- Osaka Circular Barrier City, éditions Akita Shoten, Bonita Comics, 3 volumes
  1. 2018 ISBN 978-4-253-26431-0
  2. 2019 ISBN 978-4-253-26432-7
  3. 2019 ISBN 978-4-253-26433-4
- Wombs cradle, éditions Futabasha, Action Comics, 2 tomes au total
  1. 2021 ISBN 978-4-575-44005-8
  2. 2021 ISBN 978-4-575-44006-5

=== Anthologies ===
- Shinichi Hoshi, Akita Shoten, 2012, ISBN 978-4-253-10463-0,

=== Illustration works ===
- Dolly Ito (Iwasaki Shoten, 2003,ISBN 978-4-265-04153-4
- Heisei Rumor Kaidan 5, Le chat noir revenant de l'enfer d'Iwasaki Shoten, 2003,ISBN 4-265-04755-6
- Kanata the Fox Whistle, Rironsha éditions, 2003,ISBN 978-4-652-07734-4
