= Yoshinori Shimizu =

Japanese novelist (born 1947)

Yoshinori Shimizu (清水 義範, Shimizu Yoshinori; born October 28, 1947) is a Japanese novelist.

He was born in Nagoya, Japan, and has published stories since 1977, especially young adult science fiction.

== Works in English translation ==
Crime Novel

- Labyrinth (original title: Meikyū), trans. Deborah Iwabuchi (Shueisha English Edition, 2013)

Short stories

- Japanese Entrance Exams for Earnest Young Men (original title: Kokugo nyūshi mondai hisshōhō), trans. Jeffrey Hunter (Monkey Brain Sushi: New Tastes in Japanese Fiction, Kodansha International, 1991)
- Jack and Betty Forever (original title: Eien no Jyakku & Betti), trans. Frederik L. Schodt (The Columbia Anthology of Modern Japanese Literature: Volume 2, From 1945 to the Present, Columbia University Press, 2007)

== Awards and nominations ==
- 1988 - Yoshikawa Eiji Prize for New Writers: Japanese Entrance Exams for Earnest Young Men and other stories (short story collection)
- 1989 - Nominee for Naoki Prize: Kinko no yume (金鯱の夢) (novel)
- 1990 - Nominee for Naoki Prize: Kyokō shiritsu fujōri chūgakkō (虚構市立不条理中学校) (novel)
- 1992 - Nominee for Naoki Prize: Kashiwagi Seiji no seikatsu (柏木誠治の生活) (novel)

== See also ==
- Japanese detective fiction
- Japanese science fiction
- Japanese literature
- List of Japanese authors
