= Nihon SF Taisho Award =

Annual science fiction award

- Awarded for: Japanese science fiction
- Country: Japan
- Presented by: Science Fiction and Fantasy Writers of Japan
- First award: 1980
- Website: sfwj.jp/category/japan-sf-grand-prize/

The Nihon SF Taishō Award (日本SF大賞, Nihon Esu Efu Taishō; lit. "Japan SF Grand Prize") is a Japanese science fiction award. It has been compared to the Nebula Award as it is given by the Science Fiction and Fantasy Writers of Japan or SFWJ. The Grand Prize is selected from not only Science Fiction novels, but also various SF movies, animations, and manga.

Special Awards (特別賞, Tokubetsushō) are awarded to the works that is considered to be special by the juries. Since 2011, Special Services Award (特別功労賞, Tokubetsu kōrōshō) or Contribution Award (功績賞, Kōsekishō) is presented to the deceased person.

== Winners ==
- 1st (1980) Taiyōfū Kōten (Solar Wind Node) by Akira Hori
- 2nd (1981) Kirikiri-Jin by Hisashi Inoue
- 3rd (1982) Saigo no Teki (The Last Enemy) by Masaki Yamada
- 4th (1983) Dōmu by Katsuhiro Ōtomo
- 5th (1984) Genshi Gari (Fancy-Poem Hunting) by Chiaki Kawamata
- 6th (1985) Tokyo Blackout (Capital City Disappeared) by Sakyō Komatsu
- 7th (1986) Warai Uchū no Tabi Geinin (Jongleur in Laughing Cosmos) by Musashi Kanbe
- 8th (1987) Teito Monogatari (Empire Capital Saga) by Hiroshi Aramata
- 9th (1988)
  - Misaki Ichiro no Teikō (Resistance of Misaki Ichiro) by Ryō Hanmura
  - Kaidanji: Oshikawa Shunrō (Devil of a fellow: Oshikawa Shunrō) by Jun'ya Yokota and Shingo Aizu
- 10th (1989) Jōgen no Tsuki wo Taberu Shishi (The Lion Eats Increscent Moon) by Baku Yumemakura
  - Special Award for Osamu Tezuka
- 11th (1990) Ad Bird by Makoto Shiina
- 12th (1991) Salamander Senmetsu (Salamander Omnicide) by Shinji Kajio
  - Special Award for Fujio Ishihara
- 13th (1992) Asa no Gaspard (Gaspard of the Morning) by Yasutaka Tsutsui
- 14th (1993) Venus City by Gorō Masaki
  - Special Award for Hisashi Kuroma
- 15th (1994)
  - Sensō wo Enjita Kamigamitachi (Gods Who Played War) by Mariko Ōhara
  - Joseijō Muishiki by Mari Kotani
- 16th (1995) Kototsubo (Wordpot) by Chohei Kanbayashi
  - Special Award to Masahiro Noda
- 17th (1996) Gamera 2: Attack of Legion directed by Shūsuke Kaneko
- 18th (1997)
  - Gamōtei Jiken (Murder at the Gamō Mansion) by Miyuki Miyabe
  - Neon Genesis Evangelion by Hideaki Anno
- 19th (1998) Brain Valley by Hideaki Sena
  - Special Awards to:
    - Shinichi Hoshi
    - NHK Ningen Daigaku "Uchū o Kūsō Shitekita Hitobito" by Masahiro Noda
    - Igyō Collection, edited by Masahiko Inoue
- 20th (1999) Tigris to Euphrates (Tigris and Euphrates) by Motoko Arai
  - Special Award to Ryū Mitsuse
- 21st (2000) Nihon SF Ronsōshi (A History of Controversies in Japanese SF) by Takayuki Tatsumi
- 22nd (2001) Kamekun (Mr. Turtle) by Yūsaku Kitano
- 23rd (2002)
  - Arabia no Yoru no Shuzoku by Hideo Furukawa
  - Kugutsukō by Osamu Makino
- 24th (2003) Mardock Scramble by Tō Ubukata
- 25th (2004) Innocence by Mamoru Oshii
  - Special Award to Tetsu Yano
- 26th (2005) Katadorareta Chikara by Hirotaka Tobi
- 27th (2006) Otherworld Barbara by Moto Hagio
- 28th (2007) Hoshi Shinichi 1001Wa o Tsukutta Hito (Hoshi Shinichi: The Man Who Wrote 1,001 Stories) by Hazuki Saisho
- 29th (2008)
  - From the New World by Yusuke Kishi
  - Den-noh Coil by Mitsuo Iso
  - Special Award to Masahiro Noda
- 30th (2009) Harmony by Keikaku Itō
  - Special Award to Guin Saga by Kaoru Kurimoto
- 31st (2010)
  - Nihon SF Seishinshi by Yasuo Nagayama
  - Penguin Highway by Tomihiko Morimi
  - Special Award to Takumi Shibano and Hisashi Asakura
- 32nd (2011)
  - Karyū no Miya by Sayuri Ueda
  - Special Award to Kindai Nihon Kisō Shōsetsushi: Meiji Hen (History of Modern Japanese Fantastic Novels: The Meiji Era) by Jun'ya Yokota
  - Special Services Award to Sakyo Komatsu
- 33rd (2012)
  - Kiryū Keisatsu: Jibaku Jōkō by Ryōe Tsukimura
  - Banjō no Yoru by Yūsuke Miyauchi
  - Special Award to Shisha no Teikoku (Empire of Corpses) by Keikaku Itō and Toh Enjoe
- 34th (2013)
  - Kaikin no To (Sisyphean) by Dempow Torishima
  - Special Awards to:
    - NOVA Original anthology series, edited by Nozomi Ohmori
    - Johannesburg no Tenshi Tachi (Angels of Johannesburg) by Yūsuke Miyauchi
- 35th (2014)
  - Orbital Cloud by Taiyō Fujii
  - My Humanity by Satoshi Hase
  - Contribution Award to Kazumasa Hirai
- 36th (2015)
  - Columbia Zero by Kōshū Tani
  - Toppen by Hiroyuki Morioka
  - Special Award to Gessekai Shōsetsu by Osamu Makino
  - Contribution Award to Noriyoshi Ohrai
- 37th (2016)
  - Wombs by Yumiko Shirai
  - Special Award to Shin Godzilla directed by Hideaki Anno (chief), Shinji Higuchi
- 38th (2017)
  - Game no Ōkoku by Satoshi Ogawa
  - Jisei no Yume by Hirotaka Tobi
  - Contribution Award to Kōichi Yamano
- 39th (2018)
  - Tobu Kujaku by Yūko Yamao
  - Mojika (Whirlpool of Letters) by Toh EnJoe
  - Contribution Award to Jun'ya Yokota
- 40th (2019)
  - Tenmei no Shirube by Issui Ogawa
  - Yadokari no Hoshi by Dempow Torishima
  - Special Award to the Best Japanese SF series, edited by Nozomi Ohmori and Sanzō Kusaka
  - Contribution Award to Hideo Azuma and Taku Mayumura
  - SFWJ President Award to Takashi Ogawa and Takashi Hoshi
- 41st (2020)
  - Kanki no uta Hakubutsukan wakusei III (Ode to Joy ~ Museum World III) by Hiroe Suga
  - Seikei Izumo no heitan series (nine volumes) by Jōji Hayashi
  - Special Award to Tōya Tachihara for translation and introduction of Chinese science fiction
  - Contribution Award to Yasumi Kobayashi
- 42nd (2021)
  - Ōoku: The Inner Chambers by Fumi Yoshinaga
- 43rd (2022)
  - SF-suru Shikō - Aramaki Yoshio SF Hyōron Shūsei by Yoshio Aramaki
  - Zangetsuki (Zangetsu's Tale) by Masakuni Oda
  - Contribution Awards to Tsukasa Shikano, Yasumi Tsuhara, and Masayoshi Yasugi
- 44th (2023)
  - Protocol of Humanity by Satoshi Hase
  - Contribution Awards to Takashi Ishikawa, Aritsune Toyota, Yuki Hijiri, Leiji Matsumoto
- 45th (2024)
  - Land of the Lustrous by Haruko Ichikawa
  - Special Award to Sailing on Galactic Winds by Kenrei Miyanishi
  - Contribution Awards to Kazuo Umezu, Sumiya Haruya, and Hiroshi Yamamoto
- 46th (2025)
  - Norio Itoh's Encyclopedia Fantastica by Norio Itoh
  - Special Award to Mobile Suit Gundam GQuuuuuuX
  - Contribution Award to Jun'ichiro Kida

== See also ==
- Seiun Awards
- Sense of Gender Awards
