= Jun'ya Yokota =

Japanese science fiction writer and Meiji cultural researcher

- 横田順彌
- Born: November 11, 1945; Saga Prefecture, Japan
- Died: January 4, 2019 (aged 73); Yokohama, Kanagawa Prefecture, Japan
- Education: Hosei University Law School
- Occupations: Writer; Cultural scholar
- Children: Masako Suzuki
- Writing career
- Pen name: 横田順弥 (Yokota Jun'ya); 真木じゅん (Masaki Jun)
- Language: Japanese
- Period: 1970–2019
- Genres: Science fiction; Fantasy
- Subjects: Meiji era culture and history
- Notable awards: Taisho (1988, 2011); Ozaki Memorial Prize (2011); Mystery Writers of Japan Award (2012)

Jun'ya Yokota (横田順彌, Yokota Jun'ya; 11 November 1945 - 4 January 2019) was a Japanese science fiction writer and a researcher of Meiji era cultural history. He is the winner of multiple Taisho Awards, the Ozaki Memorial Prize, and the Mystery Writers of Japan Award.

He also used the pseudonyms 横田順弥 (same pronunciation) and Jun Masaki (真木じゅん, Masaki Jun).

== Biography ==
Yokota was born 11 November 1945 in Saga Prefecture, Japan.

He became known for his knowledge of classic science fiction and his use of humor and gags in his writing. Together with Shingo Aizu, he wrote Kaidanji Oshikawa Shunrō: Nihon SF no Oya, the definitive work on Japanese science fiction author Shunrō Oshikawa. This work won the Nihon SF Taisho Award and nominated for a Seiun Award in 1988.

His 2011 work, The History of Modern Japanese Fantastic Fiction: Meiji Edition (近代日本奇想小説史 明治篇, Kindai Nihon Shōsetsushi - Meiji-hen), won a Taisho Award, the Mystery Writers of Japan Award, and the Ozaki Hokki Memorial Popular Literature Research Prize. The Science Fiction and Fantasy Writers of Japan awarded him the Special Services Award for lifetime achievements in the field of science fiction in 2018.

He died of heart failure on 4 January 2019 in Yokohama, Kanagawa Prefecture, Japan. A funeral was held for close relatives. His daughter, Masako Suzuki, lead the mourning, and an open memorial services was held afterward.

== Selected works ==
=== Novels ===
- Uchū Gomi Daisensō (宇宙ゴミ大戦争) (January 1977, Hayakawa, ISBN 4150300917)
- 2095 no Shōnen (2095年の少年) (September 1977, Shūeisha, ISBN 4086101378)
- Nazo no Uchūjin UFO (謎の宇宙人UFO) (June 1978, Hayakawa)
- Uchū no Faiaman (宇宙のファイアマン) (September 1978, Shūeisha)
- Dassen! Taimu Mashin Kitan (脱線!たいむましん奇譚) (December 1978, Kodansha)
- Poemu-kun to Mirakuru Taun no Nakama-tachi (ポエム君とミラクルタウンの仲間たち) (June 1979, Kisotengaisha)
- Ginga Patorōru Hōkoku (銀河パトロール報告) (August 1979, Futabasha)
- Asuteroido Yūkyōden (小惑星帯遊侠伝) (August 1980, Shūeisha)
- Kaseijinrui no Gyakushū (火星人類の逆襲) (May 1988, Shinchosha, ISBN 410142103X)
- Rosuto Wārudo no Himitsu (人外魔境の秘密) (February 1991, Shinchosha, ISBN 4101421048)

=== Short story collections ===
- Hansekai e Yatta Otoko: Yokojun no Shōto Shōto Shuu (反世界へ行った男 ヨコジュンのショート・ショート集) (January 1981, Tokuma Shoten, ISBN 419122154X)
- Fantanjī-san Horafuki Yobanashi (ふぁん太爺さんほら吹き夜話) (March 1981, Shūeisha)
- Yonimo Bakageta Monogatari (世にも馬鹿げた物語) (April 1981, Kadokawa Shoten)
- Yokisenu Hōteishiki: Hacha Hacha SF Tanpenshū (予期せぬ方程式―ハチャハチャSF短篇集) (May 1981, Futabasha)

=== Nonfiction ===
- SF Jiten (SF事典) (Yokota Jun'ya) (May 1977, Kōsaidō)
- Yokojun no Bikkuri Hausu (ヨコジュンのびっくりハウス) (March 1980, Futabasha)
- Nihon SF Koten Koten 1-3 (日本SFこてん古典 1-3) (Yokota Jun'ya)
  - Volume 1 (May 1980, Hayakawa)
  - Volume 2 (December 1980, Hayakawa)
  - Volume 3 (April 1981, Hayakawa)
- Daijin Kamereon-shō (対人カメレオン症) (June 1980, Kodansha)
- Ranchō Henchō Waruagaki Chōkagaku Kōza (乱調変調悪あがき超科学講座) (January 1982, Tokuma Shoten, ISBN 4191224166)
- Nagai Gō Sengenshoku Baka Zukan: Yokota Jun'ya Hacha Hacha SF Kessakushū (永井豪選原色馬鹿図鑑 横田順弥ハチャハチャSF傑作集) (February 1982, Uraku Shuppansha)
- SF Daijiten (SF大辞典) (November 1986, Kadokawa, ISBN 4041495059)
- Kaidanji Oshikawa Shunrō: Nihon SF no Oya with Shingo Aizu (December 1987, Pan Research Institute, ISBN 4893520229)
- Kindai Nihon Shōsetsushi - Meiji-hen (近代日本奇想小説史 明治篇) (January 2011, Pilar Press, ISBN 9784861940163)
- Kindai Nihon Shōsetsushi - Nyūmon-hen (近代日本奇想小説史 入門篇) (March 2012, Pilar Press, ISBN 9784861940422)

== Awards and honors ==
Yokota received the following awards and honors:

Year	Organization	Award title, Category	Work	Result	Refs
1981	Federation of Science Fiction Fan Groups of Japan	Seiun Award, Best Japanese Long Work	Asuteroido Yūkyōden (小惑星帯遊侠伝)	Nominated	
1982	Mystery Writers of Japan	Mystery Writers of Japan Award, Special Award	Nihon SF Koten Koten 1-3 (日本SFこてん古典 1-3)	Nominated	
1987	Federation of Science Fiction Fan Groups of Japan	Seiun Award, Best Nonfiction	SF Daijiten (SF大辞典)	Nominated	
1988	Federation of Science Fiction Fan Groups of Japan	Seiun Award, Best Nonfiction	Kaidanji Oshikawa Shunrō: Nihon SF no Oya	Nominated	
1988	Science Fiction and Fantasy Writers of Japan	Nihon SF Taisho Award	Kaidanji Oshikawa Shunrō: Nihon SF no Oya	Won	
1989	Federation of Science Fiction Fan Groups of Japan	Seiun Award, Best Japanese Long Work	Kaseijinrui no Gyakushū (火星人類の逆襲)	Nominated	
1992	Federation of Science Fiction Fan Groups of Japan	Seiun Award, Best Japanese Long Work	Rosuto Wārudo no Himitsu (人外魔境の秘密)	Nominated	
2011	Science Fiction and Fantasy Writers of Japan	Nihon SF Taisho Award, Special Award	Kindai Nihon Shōsetsushi - Meiji-hen (近代日本奇想小説史 明治篇)	Won	
2011	大衆文学研究会 (Daishū Bungaku Kenkyūkai)	Ozaki Hokki Memorial Popular Literature Research Prize	Kindai Nihon Shōsetsushi - Meiji-hen (近代日本奇想小説史 明治篇)	Won	
2012	Mystery Writers of Japan	Mystery Writers of Japan Award, Special Award	Kindai Nihon Shōsetsushi - Meiji-hen (近代日本奇想小説史 明治篇)	Won	
2018	Science Fiction and Fantasy Writers of Japan	Nihon SF Taisho Award, Special Services Award		Won	
