= Motoko Arai =

Japanese science fiction and fantasy writer

- 新井素子
- Born: August 8, 1960 (age 65); Nerima, Tokyo, Japan

Motoko Arai (新井素子; born August 8, 1960) is a Japanese science fiction and fantasy writer. Her writing is characterized by her use of a light conversational tone geared towards a young adult audience. She has published three series of novels and several short stories. Her works, Green Requiem and Neptune, received the Seiun Award for short story in 1981 and 1982.

== Early life ==
Born in Tokyo in 1960, Arai expressed her creativity early on as a sophomore at Metropolitan High School of Igusa when she entered the science fiction magazine Kiso Tengai’s first competition for new writers. At age 16, she received an honorable mention and praise from prominent science fiction writer Shinichi Hoshi for her short story entry Inside Myself. Hoshi was a classmate of her father's and both of her parents were employees of Kodansha. Writing the entire story in the language of a contemporary teenage girl with minimal Kanji, Arai established a precedent for an emerging genre of shojo and young adult. Two years following the competition, Inside Myself was published in paperback form.

Her novel, Hoshi e Iku Fune (A Ship to the Stars), was initially serialized in the Kō-1 Course magazine distributed to students in Japanese schools in 1981. The story details a young Japanese girl who stows away on spaceship disguised as her brother to escape the domestic pressures of home.

== Green Requiem and later success ==
Arai’s most successful work, Green Requiem, was produced during her time at Rikkyo University where she studied German literature. An English translation was produced in 1984 by the Kodansha English Library. Green Requiem tells a star crossed love story between a green haired alien woman, Asuka Misawa and a human man, Nobuhiko Shimamura. Although Asuka attempts to live a life of normalcy by dying her hair black and working at a coffee shop, she is driven to suicide by the recurrence of the song of her mother. The novel questions traditional Japanese family values and a dependence on the past through Asuka's ultimate suicide.

Green Requiem was also produced into a live action film directed by Akiyoshi Imazeki in 1988 and starred Eiji Okada and Shinobu Sakagami. Her short story, Please Open the Door was also developed into an anime in 1986.

Her novel Black Cat, published in 1984, differed in genre from the rest of her work as a crime novel, but maintained the same youthful audience and tone as her other works.

After her novels' initial successes, Arai began writing several sequels to A Ship to the Stars, Green Requiem, and Black Cat. As she and her audience grew older, Arai focused less on science fiction and fantasy and more on stories geared toward more adult subjects like marriage. In 1999, Arai returned to the science fiction genre with her novel, Tigris and Euphrates, which details a society's plan to populate a new world with artificially grown life. The plan goes awry and only one woman, Luna, remains, who decides to unfreeze the cryogenically frozen women. In a world without men, the women must learn to define new roles for themselves. The novel won the Japanese Science Fiction Grand Prize in 1999.

== Legacy ==
Arai was one of the most prominent and popular authors in Japan during the 1980s. Her unique writing style has influenced many Japanese authors including Banana Yoshimoto and others producing work in the shojo genre. Arai has expressed her views on science fiction and its usefulness to society, stating in an essay in 2011

Science fiction produces the kinds of stories that can ring an alarm bell to the world...In fact, it has fulfilled that role for a long time now, SF, Science Fiction. Serious science is at the very root of the genre, embedded in its name. Thus scientifically minded writers sound a scientifically grounded alarm bell to the world, in the form of entertainment.

Arai is often credited with the popularization of the term otaku in Japanese popular culture through her use of it in her novels.

== Selected works ==
A Ship to the Stars

- Hoshi e Iku Fune [A Ship to the Stars] (1981)
  - A Ship to the Stars (Tokyo: Kōdansha English Library, 1984)
- Soshite, Hoshi e Iku Fune ["And Then ... A Ship to the Stars"] (1987)
- Hoshi Kara Kita Fune ["A Ship From the Stars"] (1992)

Green Requiem

- Green Requiem (1983)
  - Green Requiem (Tokyo: Kōdansha English Library, 1984)
- Midori Genso: Green Requiem II (1990)

Black Cat

- Black Cat (1984)
  - Black Cat (Tokyo: Kōdansha English Library, 1991)
- Knight Fork (1985)
- Castling (1994)
- Checkmate (2003)

Tigris and Euphrates (1999)

=== Short stories ===
- Atashi no Naka no ... ["Inside Myself ..."] (1978)
- Neptune (1981)
- Tobira o Akete ["Please Open the Door"] (1984)
