= Hirotaka Tobi =

Japanese writer (born 1960)

- 飛浩隆
- Born: 1960 (age 65–66); Shimane, Japan
- Education: Shimane University
- Writing career
- Language: Japanese
- Genre: Science Fiction

Hirotaka Tobi (飛 浩隆, Tobi Hirotaka) (born 1960 in Shimane Prefecture, Japan), sometimes spelled as TOBI Hirotaka, is a Japanese science fiction writer.

== History ==
Tobi debuted by "Polyphonic Illusion" (1981) which was the winner of Sanseido SF Story Contest. After a handful of short stories published during 1980s, he was absent from SF publishing scene for a decade.

In 2002 he returned with Grande Vacance, which was nominated to Nihon SF Taisho Award, and his collection Katadorareta chikara earned the award in 2005. He received the Nihon SF Taisho Award again in 2017 for a short-stories collection Jisei no yume, which was the first time the same person to receive the award twice, after its regulation was changed from its initial awarding of the lifetime achievements.

== Awards ==
- 2005: Seiun Award Best Japanese Short Story for "Katadorareta chikara"
- 2005: Nihon SF Taisho Award for Katadorareta chikara
- 2006: Sense of Gender Award for ラギッド・ガール―廃園の天使〈2〉 [The Ragged-Skin Girl: Angel in the Deserted Garden 2]
- 2010: Seiun Award Best Japanese Short Story for "Jisei no yume"
- 2015: Seiun Award Best Japanese Short Story for "Umi no yubi"
- 2017: Nihon SF Taisho Award for Jisei no yume
- 2019: Seiun Award Best Japanese Long Story for Reigōkin (零號琴, Harmonielehre)

== Works ==
- Grande Vacance (グラン・ヴァカンス) (2002) —First book of the Angel of the Ruins series.
- Katadorareta chikara (象られた力) (2004) —Collection of early short stories.
- Ragged Girl (ラギッド・ガール) (2006) —Collection of short stories. Second book of the Angel of the Ruins series.
- Jisei no yume (自生の夢) (2016) —Collection of short stories.
- Polyphonic Illusion (ポリフォニック・イリュージョン) (2018) —Collection of essays and early short stories.
- Reigōkin (零號琴) (2018)
- Shiotsuki (鹽津城) (2024) —Collection of short stories.

=== English translations, long form ===
- Thousand Year Beach (2018), translation of Grande Vacance (2002)

=== English translations, short form ===
- "Autogenic Dreaming: Interview with the Columns of Clouds" (2012), translation of "Jisei no yume" (2009)
- "Sea Fingers" (2016), translation of "Umi no yubi" (2014)
