= Musashi Kanbe =

Japanese writer (born 1948)

Musashi Kanbe (かんべむさし; born January 16, 1948, in Ishikawa Prefecture) is a Seiun Award winning author for the novel Saikoro Tokkōtai. Kanbe was also chair of honor at Daicon III in 1981.
