= Bōken sekai =

Japanese children's magazine (1908–1920)

- Editor-in-chief: Shunro Oshikawa; Tenpu Aw
- Categories: Boys' adventure magazine
- First issue: 1908
- Final issue: 1920
- Company: Hakubunkan
- Country: Japan
- Based in: Tokyo
- Language: Japanese

Bōken sekai (Japanese: Adventure World) was a boys' adventure magazine which was started during the late Meiji period in Japan. It was headquartered in Tokyo and existed between 1908 and 1920.

== History and profile ==
Bōken sekai was established in 1908. In the first issue the magazine stated its objective as “to tell exciting stories from throughout the world that will not only inspire a spirit of daring, courage, and sincerity, but eliminate all those runts who are weak, corrupt, and decadent.” It was part of the Hakubunkan Publications and was based in Tokyo. The magazine targeted male students and featured historical heroes and adventure novels. It frequently covered literary work about Japan's victory in the Russo-Japanese War as well as about fantastic adventures around the world.

Shunro Oshikawa was the founding editor-in-chief of Bōken sekai. He was replaced by Tenpu Abe in the post in 1911, and Abe's term ended in 1917. The magazine ceased publication in 1920.
