= Tenken =

Japanese manga series

天顕祭 (Tenkensai)
- Genre: Epic; Romance; Science fiction
- Manga
- Written by: Yumiko Shirai
- Published by: Sanctuary Publishing
- English publisher: NA: One Peace Books
- Published: July 30, 2008
- Volumes: 1

Tenken (Japanese: 天顕祭, Hepburn: Tenkensai) is a Japanese doujinshi manga written and illustrated by Yumiko Shirai. It was originally written in 1997 and later sold at various conventions and by mail order. In 2008, Sanctuary Publishing sold the manga as a volume.

The series has received a positive response from critics and won the Encouragement Prize at the Japan Media Arts Festival in the manga division in 2007.

== Plot ==
The plot is based on the mythological dragon Yamata no Orochi.

== Publication ==
Yumiko Shirai first wrote the manga in 1997. Upon submitting it to a manga publisher, they told Shirai to change her art style. Shirai refused and instead sold it as doujinshi (self-published manga) at doujinshi conventions such as COMITIA and by mail order. Sanctuary Publishing published the manga in a tankōbon volume, which was released on July 30, 2008. It included an obi with comments by Nahoko Uehashi, whom Shirai had previously worked with.

In September 2010, One Peace Books announced that they licensed the manga for English publication. The released the print volume on September 15, 2010. Digital manga service Azuki added the manga to their catalog in August 2023.

== Reception ==
John Oppliger of AnimeNation praised the characters and story, particularly the use of Japanese mythology and folklore in the latter. Oppliger felt the artwork was a mix of the artsyles of Goseki Kojima's Lone Wolf and Cub and Hiroaki Samura's Blade of the Immortal. Chris Zimmerman of Comic Book Bin felt the story was unique from other manga despite its hero's journey theme. Zimmerman also liked the artwork, which he described as detailed and expressive. Scott Green of Ain't It Cool News praised the artwork and story, describing the manga as more clearly Japanese than most other manga.

At the 2007 Japan Media Arts Festival, it won the Encouragement Prize in the manga division. It was the first doujinshi to win the award.

In January 2009, Sanctuary Publishing reported the volume had sold 66,000 copies.
