= Dempow Torishima =

Japanese science-fiction writer

- Born: 1970 (age 55–56); Osaka, Japan
- Education: Osaka College of Art
- Occupation: Novelist
- Writing career
- Genres: Science fiction, Weird fiction

Dempow Torishima (酉島伝法, Torishima Denpō; born in 1970) is a Japanese science-fiction writer and illustrator. He won the Sogen SF Short Story Prize in 2011. His novel Sisyphean was named SF Magazine's best Book of 2013, won the Japan SF Award, and was nominated for the Seiun Award in 2014. Science fiction writer Jeff VanderMeer described the book as "the Kafka of "Penal Colony" and "Metamorphosis" conjured up the ghosts of PK Dick and Leonora Carrington in the context of weird terrestrial biology + far future + Brothers Quay. It truly inhabits the lives of other lifeforms but is linear." The Los Angeles Review of Books called it "a remarkable literary feat", and noted its complex exploration of technology, the human body, biology, and post-capitalist science fiction.

== Bibliography ==
- 皆勤の徒. Tokyo: Tokyo Sogensha, 2013. ISBN 4488018173
  - English edition: Sisyphean. Translated by Daniel Huddleston. San Francisco: Haikasoru, 2018. ISBN 1421580829
