= Ryu Mitsuse =

Japanese writer (1928–1999)

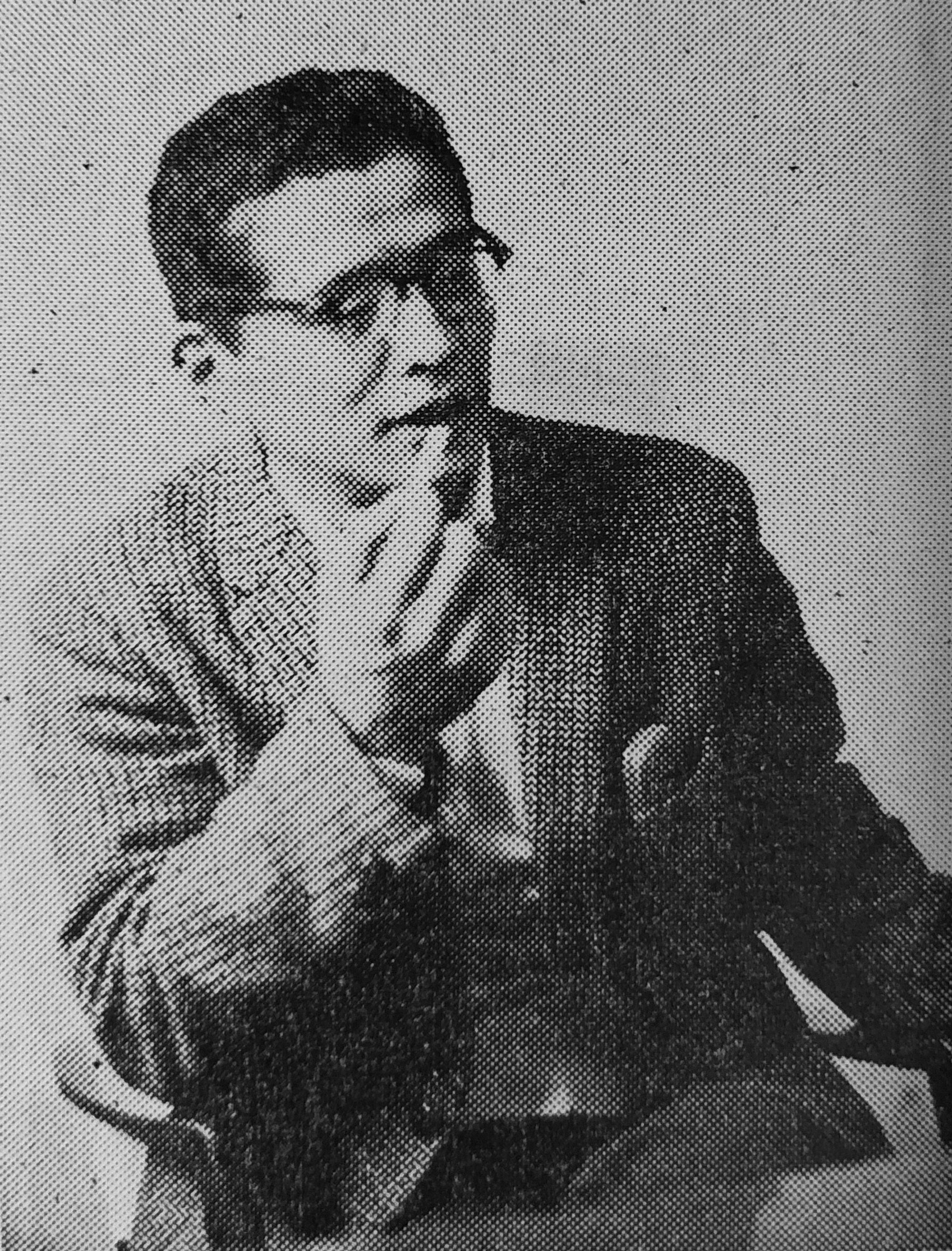
Ryū Mitsuse

Ryū Mitsuse (光瀬龍 Mitsuse Ryū, March 18, 1928 - July 7, 1999) was a Japanese novelist, science fiction writer, alternate history writer, historical novelist, and essayist. Mitsuse is the author of Hyakuoku no Hiru to Sen'oku no Yoru. Among his various works, this SF novel is considered as his representative work. Mitsuse is a founder member and was a member of the SFWJ (Science Fiction and Fantasy Writers of Japan). In the West he might be best known for manga-related works and the story The Sunset, 2217 A.D. which appeared in Frederik Pohl's "Best Science Fiction for 1972".

== Biography ==
=== Birth and Age of student ===
Mitsuse was born at Minami-Senju, Kita-Toshima District, Tokyo Prefecture in 1928. His birth name was Kimio Chiba (千葉 喜美雄). The eldest son of Kizō Chiba and Kiyo. There were three elder sisters.

In around June, 1945, he evacuated to Iwate prefecture, which was his parents' homeland, from Tokyo. He transferred to kyūsei Ichinose middle school. In 1948, he graduated from this middle school and entered the Toyo University in Tokyo. But he dropped out, and entered the Meiji University. But he again dropped out in short period. He transferred to Kawamura high school and graduated from this school. In 1949, Mitsuse entered the department of Agriculture of the Tokyo University of Education. In 1950, he transferred to the department of Science, zoology course, and graduated from this university in 1953.

In 1954, Mitsuse again entered the department of literature, philosophy course, in Tokyo University of Education, which he did not graduate from. During this period in Tokyo, he was engaging in literary coterie activities.

=== Marriage ===
In 1955, Mitsuse proposed marriage to Chitose Iizuka, but her father opposed this proposal and rejected their marriage. Mitsuse could not marry. In 1957, Mitsuse became a tutor of Koganai high school of Tokyo prefecture. And next year, he obtained a stable job as a high school teacher of biology and earth science.

In 1959, Mitsuse again proposed marriage. He talked to the father of Chitose that he would take the "surname Iizuka". Thus he was allowed to marry with Chitose, and Mitsuse became Kimio Iizuka (飯塚 喜美雄).

=== Becoming a novelist ===
Before his marriage, Mitsuse joined "Kagaku Sōsaku Club" where Takumi Shibano was operating as a publisher and an editor of the coterie magazine "Uchū-jin" in 1957. He started publishing various short novels in Uchū-jin (宇宙塵) under the pen-name Mitsuse Ryū. He published first long novel "Hakengun Kaeru" in Uchūjin. (continued)

As an SF novelist, he created the Space Chronicles series. His early long SF novel Tasogare ni Kaeru (黄昏に還る) belongs to this series. Most of his short SF stories constitute this series. Rakuyō 2217 nen (落陽2217年, The Sunset, 2217 A.D.) is one of these stories.

== Works ==
In Japanese science fiction he might be better known for the novel Ten Billion Days and One Hundred Billion Nights (百億の昼と千億の夜), which combines interest in technology and the Buddha. It was ranked the top of the Japanese SF novels in a 2006 poll by the SF Magazine. Ten Billion Days and a Hundred Billion Nights was adapted into a manga by Moto Hagio in the late 1970s.

=== Long Novels ===
- Tasogare ni Kaeru (たそがれに還る) 1964, Hayakawa Publishing
- Hyakuoku no Hiru to Sen'oku no Yoru (百億の昼と千億の夜) 1967, Hayakawa Publishing
  - English translation: Ten Billion Days and One Hundred Billion Nights, 2011, Haikasoru.
- Kan'ei Mumyōken (寛永無明剣) 1969, Rippu Shobo
- Ushinawareta Toshi no Kiroku (喪われた都市の記録) 1972, Hayakawa Publishing
- Seitō Totoku-fu (征東都督府) 1975, Hayakawa Publishing
- Hiden Miyamoto Musashi (秘伝宮本武蔵) 1976, Yomiuri Shinbunsha
- Higashi Canal Bunsho (東キャナル文書) 1977, Hayakawa Publishing
- Karera, Atlantis yori (かれら、アトランティスより) 1979, Rippu Shobo
- Uchū Kōro (宇宙航路) 1980, Kiso Tengaisha
- Gen'ei no Ballad (幻影のバラード) 1980, Tokuma Shoten
- Karera Seiun yori (かれら星雲より) 1981, Tokuma Shoten
- Shin Miyamoto Musashi (新宮本武蔵) 1981, Tokuma Shoten
- Tokoro wa Izuko, Suishi-ei (所は何処、水師営) 1983, Kadokawa Shoten
- Heike Monogatari (平家物語) 1983 - 1988, Kadokawa Shoten
- Fubuki no Niji (吹雪の虹) 1984, Shueisha
- Aurora no Kienu Ma ni (オーロラの消えぬ間に) 1984, Hayakawa Publishing
- New York, Yōsoro (紐育 (ニューヨーク)、宜候 (ようそろ)) 1984, Kadokawa Shoten
- Sabita Ginga (銹た銀河) 1987, Hayakawa Publishing
- Miyamoto Musashi Kessen-Roku (宮本武蔵血戦録) 1992, Kofusha Shuppan
- Yamiichi no Shinkirō (闇市の蜃気楼) 1993, Jitsugyo no Nihonsha
- Hidedyoshi to Nobunaga - Shisetsu Shinchō-kō-Ki (秀吉と信長 私説 信長公記) 1996, Kofusha Shuppan
- Ihon Saiyūki (異本西遊記) 1999, Kadokawa Haruki Jimusho

=== Space Chronicle series ===
==== Short novels ====
- City 0 nen (シティ0年)
- Solomon 1942 nen (ソロモン1942年)
- Hare no Umi 1979 nen (晴の海1979年)
- Bohimei 2007 nen (墓碑銘2007年)
- Hyōmu 2015 nen (氷霧2015年)
- Okhotsk 2017 nen (オホーツク2017年)
- Pilot Farm 2029 nen (パイロット・ファーム2029年)
- Kansen Suiro 2061 nen (幹線水路2061年)
- Uchū Kyūjotai 2180 nen (宇宙救助隊2180年)
- Hyōi-Sei 2197 nen (標位星2197年)
- Junshisen 2205 nen (巡視船2205年)
- Ryūsa 2210 nen (流砂2210年)
- Rakuyō 2217 nen (落陽2217年)
- City 2220 nen (市 (シティ) 2220年)
- Senjō 2241 nen (戦場2241年)
- Soula 2291 nen (スーラ2291年)
- Erutria 2411 nen (エルトリア2411年)
- Sincia Yūsuichi 2450 nen (シンシア遊水地2450年)
- Ryūsei 2505 nen (流星2505年)
- Nishi Canal-Shi 2703 nen (西キャナル市2703年)
- Renpou 3812 nen (連邦3812年)
- Cabilia 4016 nen (カビリア4016年)
- Canan 5100 nen (カナン5100年)
- Henkyō 5320 nen (辺境5320年)

==== Long novels ====
The following long novels belong to "the Space Chronicle series"

- Tasogare ni Kaeru (たそがれに還る) 1964, Hayakawa Publishing
- Ushinawareta Toshi no Kiroku (喪われた都市の記録) 1972, Hayakawa Publishing
- Higashi Canal Bunsho (東キャナル文書) 1977, Hayakawa Publishing
- Sabita Ginga (銹た銀河) 1987, Hayakawa Publishing

=== Young adult fictions ===
- Yūbae Sakusen (夕ばえ作戦) 1967, Seikosha
- Asu e no Tsuiseki (明日への追跡)
- Hokuhoku-tō wo Keikaiseyo (北北東を警戒せよ) 1969, Asahi Sonorama
- Akatsuki wa tada Gin-iro (暁はただ銀色) 1970, Asahi Sonorama
- Sono Hana wo Miruna! (その花を見るな！) 1970, Mainichi Shinbunsha
- Sakusen NACL (作戦NACL) 1971, Iwasaki Shoten
- SOS Time Patrol (SOSタイムパトロール) 1972, Asahi Sonorama
- Tachidomareba Shi (立ちどまれば・死) 1978, Asahi Sonorama
- Kieta Machi (消えた町) 1978, Tsuru Shobo
- Ijigen Kaikyō (異次元海峡) 1979, Asahi Sonorama

=== Essays ===
- Ron Sensei no Mushimegane (ロン先生の虫眼鏡) 1976, Hayakawa Publishing
- Ron Sensei no Mushimegane, Part 2 (ロン先生の虫眼鏡 Part2) 1982, Tokuma Shoten
- Ron Sensei no Mushimegane, Part 3 (ロン先生の虫眼鏡 Part3) 1983, Tokuma Shoten
- Kotori ga Sukininaru Hon (小鳥が好きになる本) illustration: Masayuki Yabu'uchi 1985, Nature Island sha/ Seiunsha
- Mushi no ii, Mushi no Hanashi (虫のいい虫の話) Dialogues with Daisaburō Okumoto 1986, Liyonsha
- Rekishi Sozoro Aruki (歴史そぞろ歩き) 1989, Tairiku Shobo
- Ushinawareta Bunmei no Kioku (失われた文明の記憶) 1996, Seishun Shuppansha
- Ushinawareta Jikūkan no Nazo (失われた時空間の謎) 1998, Seishun Shuppansha

== Stories adapted into manga ==
- Uchū 2007 nen (宇宙2007年) manga by Kyūta Ishikawa (ja:石川球太)
- Maboroshi no Yamato (まぼろしの大和) manga by Takeshi Koshiro (ja:古城武司)
- Hyakuoku no Hiru to Sen'oku no Yoru (百億の昼と千億の夜) manga by Moto Hagio (ja:萩尾望都)
- Ron Sensei no Mushimegane (ロン先生の虫眼鏡) manga by Tadashi Katō (ja:加藤唯史)
- Andromeda Stories (アンドロメダ・ストーリーズ) author: Ryū Mitsuse, manga by Keiko Takemiya (ja:竹宮惠子)
