= Shinichi Hoshi =

Japanese artist and writer (1926–1997)

- 星 新一
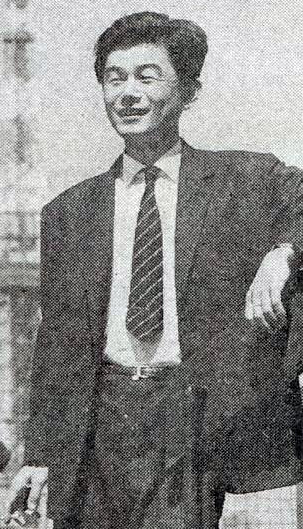
- Hoshi Shinichi "S-F Magazine" December, 1963 issue (Hayakawa Publishing)
- Born: September 6, 1926; Tokyo, Japan
- Died: December 30, 1997 (aged 71); Tokyo, Japan
- Resting place: Aoyama Cemetery (青山霊園)
- Education: University of Tokyo
- Occupations: novelist and science fiction writer
- Years active: 1949-1996
- Notable work: "Future Isoppu" (1971) "Bokkochan" (1971)
- Spouse: Hoshi Kayoko (星 香代子)
- Children: Eldest Daughter: Hoshi Yurika (星 ユリカ); Second daughter:Hoshi Marina (星 マリナ)
- Awards: Mystery Writers of Japan Award (1968); Nihon SF Taisho Award Special Award (1988)
- Website: hoshishinichi.com

Shin’ichi Hoshi (星 新一 Hoshi Shin'ichi, September 6, 1926 – December 30, 1997) was a Japanese novelist and science fiction writer best known for his "short-short" science fiction stories, often no more than three or four pages in length, of which he wrote over 1000. He also wrote mysteries and won the Mystery Writers of Japan Award for Mōsō Ginkō (Delusion Bank) in 1968.

One of his short stories, "Bokko-chan" ("Miss Bokko"), was translated into English and published in Magazine of Fantasy and Science Fiction in June 1963. His books translated into English include There Was a Knock, a collection of 15 stories, and The Spiteful Planet and Other Stories.

His friend Osamu Tezuka used his name for a character in Amazing 3, a manga and anime series which Tezuka produced in 1967.

His father, Ichi Hoshi (星一 Hoshi Ichi), is the founder of the Hoshi Pharmaceutical University and the Hoshi Pharmaceutical company. His grandmother on his mother's side, Kimiko Koganei, was the sister of Mori Ōgai. Shin'ichi's name is an abbreviated version of his father's motto, "kindness first" (親切第一 shinsetsu daiichi). After his father's death, he briefly served as the president of Hoshi Pharmaceutical. At the time of serving, Hoshi Pharmaceutical was listed on the first section of the Tokyo Stock Exchange. (Note: ただし、堤の場合は西武の経営参加や上場よりも創作活動が遙かに先行しており、星の場合は完全に経営を離れたのちに創作活動が始まっている。)

== Biography ==
=== Early life ===
Shinichi was born in Hongo, Tokyo (東京市本郷区) or current day Honkomagome (東京市本駒込). He lived with his maternal grandparents, who owned a home in Hongo, until 1945. His grandfather, Yoshikiyo Koganei (小金井良精), was an anatomist at, as well as the president of, Imperial University School of Medicine and his grandmother, Kimiko Koganei (小金井喜美子), was the younger sister of Mori Ōgai. (Note: 次女の星マリナは父、星新一の発想や文体に影響を与えた人物として、彼を幼児の頃から育てた祖父母、小金井良精・喜美子夫妻を挙げている。)

After attending the elementary school owned by the Tokyo Women's Higher Normal School (currently Ochanomizu University Elementary School), Shinichi attended the junior high school owned by the Tokyo Normal School (currently the junior high school and high school attached to the University of Tsukuba).

In 1941, the United States joined World War 2, becoming an enemy state of Japan. This resulted in English becoming viewed as an enemy language. Realizing that English would now likely be absent from the high school entrance exam, Shinichi ignored it completely, instead focusing his efforts on other subjects. After successfully completing four grades, even skipping one (there used to be five years of junior high in Japan), he managed to enter the Imperial run Tokyo High School, prompting many to call him a genius. However, after the war he hired a private English tutor to compensate for his inability. It has been speculated that his lack of English skill caused problems for him.

When Shinichi was 16, he spent one year living in the dormitory of Tokyo High School, a time his close friends would often look back on fondly. By contrast, Shinichi found the dorm life harsh, saying "It was horrible. To this day I get headaches thinking about it before I go to sleep", "I realized soon after entry, the school had a strong militaristic attitude, and not just the teachers, the students too. I absolutely despised every second I was there".

Such feelings are mostly because of the differences between post and mid-war life, and the fact that Shinichi finished high school in 2 years. As a result of his early graduation, he graduated from college at the age of 21, one year younger than normal.

=== University and graduate school ===
In 1948, Hoshi graduated from the University of Tokyo's Department of Agricultural Chemistry. His graduation thesis was done on the cultivation of solid penicillin.

Despite passing the recruitment exam for high-government officials, (Note: のちの国家公務員上級（甲種）試験やI種試験、現在の国家公務員総合職試験にあたる。) he was not offered a job. On top of that, his father who disliked government officials discovered he took the exam, causing Shinichi to be severely reprimanded. So, he entered graduate school at the University of Tokyo where he studied agricultural chemistry under Kinichiro Sakaguchi (坂口謹一郎) where he manufactured the starch-degrading enzyme Amylase in liquids. Completing the first semester of graduate school in 1950. (Note: ただし、星自身は「先日、東大の大学院の女性の会（妙なのがあるな）に呼ばれ、話をした。修士課程を二つ出て、博士課程に在籍の人もいた。まいったね。それから私は、自分の略歴から、大学院に行ったことを削るようにしている。学歴で作品が書けるわけじゃない」と述べている。。) His master's thesis was a "Study of Amylase Production by Submersion in Molds of the Genus Aspergillus".

In 1949, his first published short-short story, "For the Fox", was released in the doujinshi "The Lindin Monthly Report".

=== Hoshi Pharmaceutical ===
In 1951, his father died suddenly, causing Hoshi to drop out of graduate school and take over his father's company. At the time, Hoshi Pharmaceutical was in bad shape. Hoshi was forced to deal with the situation until the company went bankrupt and was handed over to Yonetaro Otani (大谷米太郎). Hoshi was hospitalized and in immense pain during this process, and later said, "I don't even want to remember these past several years. They are the reason I'm anti-social."

Immediately after letting go of the company, he read "The Martian Chronicles" by Ray Bradbury on his hospital bed and was deeply moved. He recalls that without this chance reading, he would not have pursued a career in science fiction. He grew weary of the harsh realities in his daily life and became obsessed with the wondrous idea of "flying saucers." He attended the "Flying Saucer Research Group" that happened to be nearby. Other known members include Yukio Mishima (三島由紀夫) and Shintaro Ishihara (石原慎太郎).

After losing the company, he remained unemployed until his writing debut. During this time, Hoshi remained a part-time director of Hoshi Pharmaceutical University, earning 100,000 yen a month (not adjusted for inflation), making it difficult to pay the bills, and reducing him to poverty. (Note: その後、1970年の『日本紳士録』第58版にも「星薬科大理事」との肩書が記載されている。)

== Bibliography ==
- Miss Bokko (Bokko-chan), Shinchosha Publishing Co. Ltd., 1963.
- The Spiteful Planet and Other Stories, Japan Times, 1978.
- There Was a Knock, Kodansha, 1984. ISBN 4-06-186003-8
- The Capricious Robot, Kodansha International, 1986. ISBN 4-7700-2212-3
- The Bag of Surprises, Kodansha International, 1989. ISBN 4-7700-2229-8
- The Whimsical Robot (Kimagure Robotto), Kadokawa Shoten
- Aesop Fables for the Future (Mirai Issoppu), Shinchosha Publishing Co. Ltd.
- Heaven with a Demon (Akuma no iru Tengoku), Shinchosha Publishing Co. Ltd.
- Inconsistent Parts (Chiguhaguna Buhin), Shinchosha Publishing Co. Ltd.
- Welcome, Earth! (Yokoso Chikyu-san) Shinchosha Publishing Co. Ltd.
- Meddlesome Gods (Osekkaina Kamigami), Shinchosha Publishing Co. Ltd.
- The Ending You Wished For (Onozomino Ketsumatsu), Shinchosha Publishing Co. Ltd.
- Bonbons and Nightmares (Bonbon to Akumu), Shinchosha Publishing Co. Ltd.
- Greetings from Outer Space (Uchu no Aisatsu), Shinchosha Publishing Co. Ltd.
- The Other Side of the Swing (Buranko no Mukode), Shinchosha Publishing Co. Ltd.
- The Modern Adventures of Baron Munchausen (Hora Danshaku Gendai no Boken)
- The Fairy Distributing Company (Yosei Haikyu Gaisha)
- My Nation (Mai Kokka)
- A Handful of Future (Hitonigiri no Mirai)
