= Nihon SF Taikai =

Japanese science fiction convention

The Nihon SF Taikai (日本SF大会, Japan SF Convention) is an annual science fiction convention held in Japan. Each of these conventions is officially the Nth Nihon SF Taikai (第N回日本SF大会), but they are more popularly known by the official nicknames given to them based on their locations, e.g. TOKON (when it is held in Tokyo) or DAICON (when it is held in Osaka).

Each year the Nihon SF Taikai attracts between 1,000 and 1,500 science fiction fans. Events at the convention include panel discussions, lectures, readings, screenings, parties, games, concerts, and a dealing room for the sale of rare books, magazines, and other items related to science fiction.

A number of prizes are awarded at the convention, most notably the Seiun Award for the best science fiction of the year as voted by attendees of the convention.

Outside Japan, the Nihon SF Taikai is most famous for the animation for the opening ceremonies of Daicon III and IV Opening Animations, which was produced by the animators that later became Gainax. The DAICON IV opening video features a girl in a Playboy Bunny suit with cameos from many science fiction films and stories.

== List of Taikai locations ==
1. 1962 – Tokyo – MEG-CON
2. 1963 – Tokyo – TOKON
3. 1964 – Osaka – DAICON
4. 1965 – Tokyo – TOKON 2
5. 1966 – Nagoya – MEICON
6. 1967 – Tokyo – TOKON 3
7. 1968 – Tokyo – TOKON 4
8. 1969 – Kumamoto-ken – KYUKON
9. 1970 – Tokyo – TOKON 5
10. 1971 – Osaka – DAICON 2
11. 1972 – Nagoya – MEICON 2
12. 1973 – Hokkaidō – EZOCON
13. 1974 – Kyoto – MIYACON
14. 1975 – Kobe – SHINCON
15. 1976 – Tokyo – TOKON 6
16. 1977 – Yokohama – HINCON
17. 1978 – Kanagawa-ken – ASHINOCON
18. 1979 – Nagoya – MEICON 3
19. 1980 – Tokyo – TOKON 7
20. 1981 – Osaka – DAICON 3
21. 1982 – Tokyo – TOKON 8
22. 1983 – Osaka – DAICON 4
23. 1984 – Hokkaidō – EZOCON 2
24. 1985 – Niigata-ken – GATACON Special Summer Fest
25. 1986 – Osaka – DAICON 5
26. 1987 – Ishikawa-ken – URACON '87
27. 1988 – Gunma-ken – MiG-CON
28. 1989 – Nagoya – DAINA CON EX
29. 1990 – Tokyo – TOKON 9
30. 1991 – Kanazawa – i-CON
31. 1992 – Yokohama – HAMACON
32. 1993 – Osaka – DAICON 6
33. 1994 – Okinawa – RYUCON
34. 1995 – Shizuoka (Hamamatsu) – はまなこん (Hamanacon)
35. 1996 – Kitakyushu – コクラノミコン (Kokuranomicon)
36. 1997 – Hiroshima – あきこん (Akicon)
37. 1998 – Nagoya (Mars) – CAPRICON 1
38. 1999 – Nagano-ken – やねこん (Yanecon)
39. 2000 – Yokohama – Zero-CON
40. 2001 – Makuhari Messe, Chiba – SF2001 International Future Confererence (未来国際会議, Mirai Kokusai Kaigi)
41. 2002 – Tamayu, Shimane – ゆ～こん (Yūcon)
42. 2003 – Shiobara, Tochigi – T-con 2003
43. 2004 – Gifu – G-CON
44. 2005 – Yokohama – HAMACON 2
45. 2006 – Matsushima – みちのくSF祭ずんこん (Michinoku SF Matsuri Zuncon)
46. 2007 – Yokohama – Nippon2007 65th World Science Fiction Convention
47. 2008 – Osaka – DAICON 7
48. 2009 – Shiobara, Tochigi – T-con 2009
49. 2010 – Edogawa, Tokyo – TOKON 10
50. 2011 – Shizuoka – DONBURACON-L
51. 2012 – Yūbari, Hokkaidō – VARICON
52. 2013 – Hiroshima – KOICON
53. 2014 – Tsukuba, Ibaraki – NUTS-CON
54. 2015 – Yonago, Tottori – COMECON
55. 2016 – Toba, Mie – ISESHIMACON
56. 2017 – Shizuoka – DONBURACON-LL
57. 2018 – Minakami – JURACON
58. 2019 – Saitama – Sci-con
59. 2020 – Kōriyama, Fukushima – F-CON (postponed to 2022 due to the COVID-19 pandemic)
60. 2021 – Takamatsu, Kagawa – SF60
61. 2023 – Saitama – Sci-con 2023
62. 2024 – Chino, Nagano – やねこんR (Yanecon R)
