= Akira Hori =

Japanese science fiction writer (born 1944)

- Born: June 21, 1944; Tatsuno, Hyogo, Japan
- Education: Osaka University
- Writing career
- Notable awards: 1980 Nihon SF Taisho Award; Seiun Award

Akira Hori (堀晃, born 1944 in Tatsuno, Hyogo) is a Japanese science fiction writer. He has been involved in science fiction since high school and has a degree from Osaka University in engineering. He won the first Nihon SF Taisho Award in 1980 and has also won the Seiun Award in 1989 for Babylonia Wave.

== Works in English translation ==
- "Open Up" (Speculative Japan 2, Kurodahan Press, 2011)
