= Kodansha USA =

American subsidiary of Japanese publisher

Kodansha USA Publishing, LLC
- Parent company: Kodansha
- Status: Active
- Founded: July 1, 2008; 18 years ago
- Country of origin: United States
- Headquarters location: New York, New York
- Distribution: Penguin Random House Publisher Services (US); Turnaround Publisher Services (UK)
- Key people: Alvin Lu (president and CEO); Takashi Sakuda (COO)
- Publication types: Books; Manga
- Nonfiction topics: Japan; Japanese culture
- Imprints: Kodansha Comics; Vertical
- Official website: kodansha.us

Kodansha USA Publishing, LLC is a publishing company based in New York, US, and a subsidiary of Japan's largest publishing company Kodansha. Established July 1st 2008, Kodansha USA publishes books relating to Japan, Japanese culture, and manga, the latter under their Kodansha Manga imprint (formerly Kodansha Comics).

In 2020, Kodansha announced that it had consolidated Kodansha Advanced Media and Vertical into Kodansha USA Publishing, with Kodansha Advanced Media general manager Alvin Lu becoming the president and CEO of Kodansha USA Publishing.

On March 9, 2021, Kodansha USA Publishing announced it had rebranded and relaunched its website, and unified Kodansha Comics, Kodansha USA International, and Vertical under the Kodansha name, and Kodansha Comics being renamed Kodansha Manga.

== Kodansha Manga ==
Kodansha Manga (formerly Kodansha Comics) is an imprint of Kodansha USA Publishing who are responsible for the localization and publication of Kodansha's manga. Established in 2009, the imprint was established to coincide with the 100th anniversary of Kodansha. The imprint's launching titles were Ghost in the Shell by Masamune Shirow and Akira by Katsuhiro Otomo, both of which were previously published in English by Dark Horse Comics.

Kodansha Comics later began to acquire series that were previously published by Tokyopop, after their licenses were made to expire by Kodansha. Although bearing the Kodansha name, Kodansha Comics was not intended to be the sole distributor of Kodansha titles, with Del Rey Manga publishing many of Kodansha's titles until the company was shut down in 2010. After the shut down of Del Rey Manga on October 4, 2010, Kodansha Comics gradually began to publish some Del Rey Manga titles, with Random House acting as the distributor for the imprint.

On March 9, 2021, Kodansha Comics was renamed Kodansha Manga.

== Vertical ==
Vertical
- Parent company: Kodansha USA Publishing
- Status: Active
- Founded: 2001; 25 years ago
- Founder: Hiroki Sakai
- Country of origin: United States
- Headquarters location: New York City, New York, U.S.
- Distribution: Penguin Random House Publisher Services
- Publication types: Fiction, non-fiction, manga
- Nonfiction topics: Business, self-help, lifestyle
- Fiction genres: Sci-fi, fantasy, mystery
- Owner: Kodansha (since 2020)
- Official website: www.vertical-inc.com/index.html

Vertical is a Japanese novel and manga imprint of Kodansha USA Publishing. Founded in 2001 by Hiroki Sakai, in February 2011, the company was bought by Kodansha (46.7%) and Dai Nippon Printing (46.0%). The company was consolidated into Kodansha USA Publishing in 2020.

=== Titles ===
Vertical, Inc. publishes books from a variety of genres, including prose fiction, manga, nonfiction, crafts, and cooking.

==== Novels ====
- A Caring Man (Akira Arai)
- A Rabbit's Eyes (Kenjiro Haitani)
- Ashes (Kenzo Kitakata)
- Attack on Titan: Before the Fall (Ryō Suzukaze)
- Attack on Titan: Harsh Mistress of the City (Ryō Kawakami)
- Attack on Titan: Lost Girls (Hiroshi Seko)
- The Blade of the Courtesans (Keiichiro Ryu)
- Body (Asa Nonami)
- The Cage (Kenzo Kitakata)
- The Cat in the Coffin (Mariko Koike)
- City of Refuge (Kenzo Kitakata)
- The Crimson Labyrinth (Yusuke Kishi)
- Edge (Koji Suzuki)
- ENMA the Immortal (Fumi Nakamura)
- Fallout (Tetsuo Takashima)
- The Flowers of Edo (Michael Dana Kennedy)
- Gray Men (Tomotake Ishikawa)
- Guin Saga (Kaoru Kurimoto)
- A Guru is Born (Takeshi Kitano)
- Innocent World (Ami Sakurai)
- Monogatari series (NisiOisiN)
- Kubikiri Cycle (NisiOisiN)
- Lala Pipo (Hideo Okuda)
- May in the Valley of the Rainbow (Yoichi Funado)
- The Mediterranean Trilogy (Shiono Nanami)
- Naoko (Keigo Higashino)
- Now You're One of Us (Asa Nonami)
- Outlet (Randy Taguchi)
- Paradise (Koji Suzuki)
- Parasite Eve (Hideaki Sena)
- The Poison Ape (Arimasa Osawa)
- Pro Bono (Seicho Matsumoto)
- Promenade of the Gods (Koji Suzuki)
- The Ring Trilogy (Koji Suzuki)
- Sayonara, Gangsters (Genichiro Takahashi)
- Seraph of the End: Guren Ichinose: Catastrophe at Sixteen (Takaya Kagami)
- Seraph of the End: Guren Ichinose: World Resurrection at Nineteen (Takaya Kagami)
- Shinjuku Shark (Arimasa Osawa)
- Summer of the Ubume (Natsuhiko Kyogoku)
- Translucent Tree (Nobuko Takagi)
- Twinkle Twinkle (Kaori Ekuni)
- Winter Sleep (Kenzo Kitakata)
- Zero Over Berlin (Joh Sasaki)

==== Short story collections ====
- Birthday (Koji Suzuki)
- Boy (Takeshi Kitano)
- Dark Water (Koji Suzuki)
- Season of Infidelity (Oniroku Dan)

==== Non-fiction and miscellaneous ====
- A Slow Death (NHK-TV "Tokaimura Criticality Accident" Crew)
- Aranzi Aranzo
- The Honda Myth (Masaaki Sato)
- Iron Chef Chen's Knockout Chinese (Chen Kenichi)
- J-Horror (David Kalat)
- Nintendo Magic (Osamu Inoue)
- North Korea Kidnapped My Daughter (Sakie Yokota)
- Saying Yes to Japan (Tim Clark, Carl Kay)
- Sayonara, Mr. Fatty! (Toshio Okada)
- Slow Sex Secrets (Adam Tokunaga)
- The Toyota Leaders (Masaaki Sato)
- Walking Your Way to a Better Life (Kimiko)

==== Manga ====
- 5 Centimeters Per Second (Makoto Shinkai, Yukiko Seike)
- 7 Billion Needles (Nobuaki Tadano)
- A School Frozen in Time (Mizuki Tsujimura, Naoshi Arakawa)
- An Older Guy's VR First Love (Tomoko Boryoku)
- After the Rain (Jun Mayuzuki)
- Ajin: Demi-Human (Gamon Sakurai)
- Andromeda Stories (Ryu Mitsuse, Keiko Takemiya)
- Avant-garde Yumeko (Shūzō Oshimi)
- Ayako (Osamu Tezuka)
- Apollo's Song (Osamu Tezuka)
- Black Jack (Osamu Tezuka)
- Blame! (Tsutomu Nihei)
- Blood on the Tracks (Shuzo Oshimi)
- The Book of Human Insects (Osamu Tezuka)
- Buddha (Osamu Tezuka)
- Cardfight!! Vanguard (Akira Itō)
- Chi's Sweet Home (Kanata Konami)
- Ciguatera (Minoru Furuya)
- CITY (Keiichi Arawi)
- Devils' Line (Ryou Hanada)
- Dissolving Classroom (Junji Ito)
- Don't Toy with Me, Miss Nagatoro (Nanashi)
- Dororo (Osamu Tezuka)
- Dream Fossil (Satosi Kon)
- The Drops of God (Tadashi Agi, Shu Okimoto)
- The Flowers of Evil (Shūzō Oshimi)
- Flying Witch (Chihiro Ishizuka)
- From the New World (Yusuke Kishi)
- The Garden of Words (Makoto Shinkai)
- A Girl on the Shore (Inio Asano)
- Go with the Clouds, North by Northwest (Aki Irie)
- The Gods Lie (Kaori Ozaki)
- The Great Cleric (Broccoli Lion, Hiiro Akikaze)
- GTO: 14 Days in Shonan (Tooru Fujisawa)
- GTO: The Early Years (Tooru Fujisawa)
- The Guin Saga Manga: The Seven Magi (Kaoru Kurimoto, Kazuaki Yanagisawa)
- Helter Skelter (Kyoko Okazaki)
- Heroman (Stan Lee, BONES, Tamon Ohta)
- Immortal Hounds (Ryō Yasohachi)
- In Clothes Called Fat (Moyoco Anno)
- Insufficient Direction (Moyoco Anno)
- Knights of Sidonia (Tsutomu Nihei)
- Limit (Keiko Suenobu)
- Lychee Light Club (Usamaru Furuya)
- Message to Adolf (Osamu Tezuka)
- Miss Miyazen Would Love to Get Closer to You (Taka Aki)
- Mobile Suit Gundam: The Origin (Yoshikazu Yasuhiko, Yoshiyuki Tomino, Hajime Yatate)
- Mobile Suit Gundam Wing: Endless Waltz – Glory of the Losers (Tomofumi Ogasawara, Katsuyuki Sumisawa)
- Moteki (Mitsuro Kubo)
- Mysterious Girlfriend X (Riichi Ueshiba)
- MW (Osamu Tezuka)
- My Neighbor Seki (Takuma Morishige)
- My Boy (Hitomi Takano)
- Ninja Slayer (Bradley Bond, Philip "Ninj@" Morzez)
- Nichijou (Keiichi Arawi)
- No Longer Human (Usamaru Furuya)
- Ode to Kirihito (Osamu Tezuka)
- Paradise Kiss (Ai Yazawa)
- Peepo Choo (Felipe Smith)
- Pink (Kyoko Okazaki)
- Pop Team Epic (Bkub Okawa)
- Princess Knight (Osamu Tezuka)
- Prophecy (Tetsuya Tsutsui)
- Sakuran (Moyoco Anno)
- Sickness Unto Death (Takahiro Seguchi)
- Summer Wars (Mamoru Hosoda)
- To Terra... (Keiko Takemiya)
- Tokyo ESP (Hajime Segawa)
- Tropic of the Sea (Satoshi Kon)
- The Twin Knights (Osamu Tezuka)
- To the Abandoned Sacred Beasts (Maybe)
- Twin Spica (Kou Yaginuma)
- Utsubora: The Story of a Novelist (Asumiko Nakamura)
- Velveteen & Mandala (Jiro Matsumoto)
- What Did You Eat Yesterday? (Fumi Yoshinaga)
- Witchcraft Works (Ryu Mizunagi)
- Wolfsmund (Mitsuhisa Kuji)

== Kodansha Advanced Media ==
Kodansha Advanced Media, LLC
- Type: Subsidiary
- Founded: December 4, 2014; 11 years ago
- Defunct: July 1, 2019
- Fate: Merged into Kodansha USA Publishing
- Headquarters: San Francisco, California, United States
- Key people: Hiroaki Morita (president and CEO); Alvin Lu (general manager)
- Products: Digital manga distribution
- Owner: Kodansha; Digital Garage (19%)
- Parent: Kodansha
- Website: kodanshacomics.com

Kodansha Advanced Media, LLC was an American distribution company, based in San Francisco, and established on December 4, 2014. The company was a subsidiary of Kodansha, and a sister company of Kodansha USA Publishing. Kodansha Advanced Media handled the digital distribution of Kodansha Comics manga, as well as digital distribution of select Vertical titles. Kodansha Advanced Media also maintained the Kodansha Comics website.

Kodansha Advanced Media was established in 2014 with funding from Kodansha USA Publishing in order to handle the digital distribution of Kodansha Comics' manga titles in English. In February 2015, Kodansha and Digital Garage announced a joint venture to distribute manga digitally in North America, establishing a Japanese-based joint venture company to invest in digital distribution services, and using Kodansha Advanced Media to distribute manga via websites and smartphone apps. Kodansha Advanced Media is also responsible for handling film releases and events, and in 2015, were responsible for releasing an app for Yamada-kun and the Seven Witches for English-speaking audiences.

In response to piracy, Kodansha Advanced Media simul-translated and simul-published Kodansha Comics titles, as well as released certain titles on digital platforms prior to physical printing. In December 2015, Kodansha Advanced Media announced that they had made Kodansha Comics titles available in North American public libraries digitally through OverDrive.
