= Kenjirō =

- Gender: Male

Origin
- Origin: Japanese
- Meaning: Different meanings depending on the kanji used

Kenjirō, Kenjiro, Kenjirou or Kenjiroh (written: 健二郎, 健次郎, 健治郎, 健滋朗, 謙二郎, 謙次郎, 建次郎, 賢二郎 or 乾二郎) is a masculine Japanese given name. Notable people with the name include:

- Kenjirō Abe (阿部 健治郎; born 1989), Japanese shogi player;
- Den Kenjirō (田 健治郎; 1855–1930), Japanese politician;
- Kenjiro Ezoe (江添 建次郎; born 1982), Japanese footballer;
- Kenjiro Haitani (灰谷 健次郎; 1934–2006), Japanese writer;
- Kenjiro Hata (畑 健二郎; born 1975), Japanese manga artist;
- Kenjiro Hiraki (開 健次郎; born 1940), Japanese sport wrestler;
- Kenjirō Ishimaru (石丸 謙二郎; born 1953), Japanese actor;
- Kenjiro Maeda (前田 健滋朗; born 1990), Japanese basketball coach;
- Kenjiro Matsuki (松木 謙治郎; 1909–1986), Japanese baseball player and manager;
- Kenjiro Matsumoto (松本 健次郎; born 1943), Japanese swimmer;
- Kenjiro Nomura (baseball) (野村 謙二郎; born 1966), Japanese baseball player;
- Kenjiro Okazaki (岡崎 乾二郎; born 1955), Japanese artist;
- Kenjiro Shinozuka (篠塚 建次郎; born 1948), Japanese rally driver;
- Kenjiro Shoda (正田 建次郎; 1902–1977), Japanese mathematician;
- Kenjiro Takayanagi (高柳 健次郎; 1899–1990), Japanese engineer and television pioneer;
- Kenjiro Tamiya (田宮 健次郎; 1928 - 2010), Japanese baseball player;
- Kenjiro Todoroki (轟 賢二郎; born 1975), Japanese yacht racer;
- Kenjirō Tokutomi (徳富 健次郎; 1868–1927), Japanese writer and philosopher;
- Kenjiro Tsuda (津田 健次郎; born 1971), Japanese voice actor and actor;
- Ume Kenjirō (梅 謙次郎; 1860–1910), Japanese educator and lawyer;
- Yamakawa Kenjirō (山川 健次郎; 1854–1931), Japanese samurai, physicist and writer.

== Fictional characters ==
- Kenjiro Shirabu (白布 賢二郎), a character from the manga and anime Haikyu!! with the position of setter from Shiratorizawa Academy
