= Children of the Sun =

Children of the Sun may refer to:

== Film ==
- Children of the Sun, a 1960 animated film by John Hubley and Faith Hubley
- Children of the Sun (1962 film), a Moroccan film directed by Jacques Séverac
- Children of the Sun (2007 film), an Israeli documentary
- Children of the Sun (2019 film) or Gaadi, a Sri Lankan film

== Literature ==
- Children of the Sun (book), a 1957 book by Morris West
- Children of the Sun (play), a 1905 play by Maxim Gorky
- Children of the Sun, a children's book by Kenjiro Haitani

== Music ==
=== Albums ===
- Children of the Sun (Billy Thorpe album) or the title song, 1979
- Children of the Sun (The Sallyangie album) or the title song, 1969
- Children of the Sun (Jay Chou album), 2026

=== Songs ===
- "Children of the Sun" (Feeder song), 2012
- "Children of the Sun" (Tinie Tempah song), 2013
- "Children of the Sun", by Dead Can Dance from Anastasis, 2012
- "Children of the Sun", by Flowing Tears from Serpentine, 2002
- "Children of the Sun", by Hawkwind from In Search of Space, 1971
- "Children of the Sun", by Judas Priest from Firepower, 2018
- "Children of the Sun", by Klaxons from Love Frequency, 2014
- "Children of the Sun", by Lindemann from Skills in Pills, 2015
- "Children of the Sun", by Mandrill from Mandrill Is, 1972
- "Children of the Sun", by the Misunderstood, 1969
- "Children of the Sun", by Poets of the Fall from Clearview, 2016
- "Children of the Sun", by Two Steps from Hell from Battlecry, 2015
- "Children of the Sun", by Jay Chou from Children of the Sun, 2026

== Other uses ==
- Children of the Sun (role-playing game), a 2002 dieselpunk tabletop game
- Children of the Sun (video game), a 2024 game published by Devolver Digital
- Children of the Sun (tribe), or Spokane people, a Native American tribe who inhabited the northwest U.S.

== See also ==
- Child of the Sun (disambiguation)
