= Yusuke Kishi =

Japanese author (born 1959)

- Born: January 3, 1959 (age 67); Osaka, Japan
- Occupation: Novelist
- Known for: The Crimson Labyrinth; From the New World

Yusuke Kishi (貴志 祐介, Kishi Yūsuke; born January 3, 1959) is a Japanese author. He is a member of the Mystery Writers of Japan and the Honkaku Mystery Writers Club of Japan.

== Biography ==
He graduated from Kyoto University with a degree in economics. After working for a life insurance company for several years, Kishi started his writing career as a freelancer. He has twice won the Japan Horror Novel Award and has achieved a bestselling status in Japan with multiple works adapted to the screen. The Crimson Labyrinth marks his American debut.

== Bibliography ==
=== Kei Enomoto series ===
- Novel
  - The Glass Hammer (硝子のハンマー, Garasu no Hammā), 2004
- Short story collections
  - The House of Will-o'-the-Wisp (狐火の家, Kitsunebi no Ie), 2008
  - The Locked Room Murders (鍵のかかった部屋, Kagi no Kakatta Heya), 2011

=== Standalone novels ===
- Isola: Persona 13 (十三番目の人格 ISOLA, Jūsanban-me no Jinkaku: Isora), 1996
- Black House (黒い家, Kuroi Ie), 1997
- Chirping of Angels (天使の囀り, Tenshi no Saezuri), 1998
- The Crimson Labyrinth (クリムゾンの迷宮, Kurimuzon no Meikyū), released in 1999 in Japan, published in English in 2006 by Vertical
- The Blue Flame (青の炎, Ao no Honō), 1999
- From the New World (新世界より, Shinsekai Yori), 2008
- Lesson of the Evil (悪の教典, Aku no Kyōten), 2010
- Dark Zone (ダークゾーン, Dāku Zōn), 2011
- The Wasp (雀蜂, Suzumebachi), 2013
- Sinner's Choice (罪人の選択, Tsumibito no Sentaku), 2020
- We Are All Alone (我々は、みな孤独である, Wareware Wa Mina Kodoku De Aru), 2020

== Adaptations ==
Japanese films

- Kuori le (1999)
- Isola (2000)
- The Blue Light (2003)
- Lesson of the Evil (2012) (Aku no Kyōten)

South Korean film

- Black House (2007) (Kuroi Ie)

Anime

- From the New World (2012)

Hong Kong film

- Legally Declared Dead 死因無可疑 (based on Black House) (2019)

Manga

- Isola: Persona 13 (1999)
- The Blue Flame (2003)
- From the New World (2012–2014)
- Lesson of the Evil (2012–2015)
- The Crimson Labyrinth (2013–2014)
- Chirping of Angels (2020)

== Awards ==
- 1996 - 3rd Japanese Horror Novel Award (ja): Isola
- 1997 - 4th Japanese Horror Novel Award (ja): Kuroi Ie (Black House)
- 2000 - 21st Yoshikawa Eiji Award Candidate (ja) and 13th Yamamoto Shugōrō Award Candidate (ja): Ao no Honō (The Blue Flame)
- 2005 - 58th Mystery Writers of Japan Award for Best Novel: Garasu no Hammā (The Glass Hammer)
- 2008 - Japan SF Award (ja) and 30th Yoshikawa Eiji Award Candidate (ja) : From the New World
- 2010 - Yamada Futaro Award : Aku no Kyōten (Lesson of the Evil)
- 2011 - The Best Japanese Crime Fiction of the Year (Kono Mystery ga Sugoi! 2011): Aku no Kyōten (Lesson of the Evil)
