= Child of the Sun (disambiguation) =

Child of the Sun is a group of buildings on the campus of Florida Southern College.

Child of the Sun may refer to:

- Child of the Sun (album), by Mayte Garcia, produced by Prince
- "Child of the Sun", 1942 science fiction story by Leigh Brackett
- Child of the Sun, 1966 historical fiction novel by Kyle Onstott and Lance Horner
- "Child of the Sun", a song from the 1980 album Land of Gold by Goombay Dance Band

== See also ==
- Children of the Sun (disambiguation)
