= Konami Kanata =

Japanese manga artist (born 1958)

Konami Kanata こなみ かなた
- Born: 3 July 1958 (age 68) Nagano Prefecture
- Area: Manga artist
- Notable works: Chi's Sweet Home

Konami Kanata (こなみ かなた) is a Japanese manga artist best known for her cat manga Chi's Sweet Home. Her first manga Buchineko JamJam (ブチねこジャムジャム) was published in the magazine Nakayoshi in 1982. Chi's Sweet Home, FukuFuku: Kitten Tales (ふくふくふにゃ～ん子猫だにゃん, Fuku Fuku Funyan Koneko Da Nyan), and Sue & Tai-chan (スーと鯛ちゃん, Suu to Taichan) have been published in English by Vertical Inc.

Manga artist Risa Itō and Kanata are from the same small town and Kanata's father was Itō's homeroom teacher in elementary school. Kanata has a blood type of O.
