= Chi's Sweet Home =

Japanese manga series and its adaptations

- First tankōbon volume cover, featuring Chi

チーズスイートホーム (Chīzu Suīto Hōmu)
- Genre: Comedy; Slice of life
- Manga
- Written by: Kanata Konami
- Published by: Kodansha
- English publisher: NA: Vertical, Inc.
- Magazine: Morning
- Original run: January 8, 2004 – June 18, 2015
- Volumes: 12
Further information
Anime television series
Directed by	Mitsuyuki Masuhara
Produced by	Shunji Aoki; Kenichi Komori; Shū Murayama
Written by	Tomoko Konparu
Music by	META boys
Studio	Madhouse
Licensed by	AUS: Siren Visual; NA: Discotek Media
Original network	TXN (TV Tokyo)
Original run	March 31, 2008 – September 26, 2008
Episodes	104
Anime television series
Chi's Sweet Home: Chi's New Address
Directed by	Mitsuyuki Masuhara
Produced by	Tomotaka Kumamoto; Takahiro Suzuki
Written by	Tomoko Konparu
Music by	META boys
Studio	Madhouse
Licensed by	AUS: Siren Visual; NA: Discotek Media
Original network	TXN (TV Tokyo)
Original run	March 30, 2009 – September 25, 2009
Episodes	104
Original video animation
Chi's Sweet Home: Chi Meets Cocchi
Directed by	Morio Asaka
Written by	Tomoko Konparu
Music by	META boys
Studio	Madhouse
Released	April 23, 2010
Runtime	13 minutes
Episodes	1
Anime television series
Chi's Sweet Adventure
Directed by	Kiminori Kusano
Produced by	Kaori Kitamoto (chief)
Written by	Misuzu Chiba
Music by	Kenji Kondō
Studio	Marza Animation Planet
Licensed by	Amazon Prime Video
Original network	TXN (TV Tokyo)
Original run	October 2, 2016 – September 30, 2018
Episodes	76
Original net animation
Chi's Sweet Summer Vacation
Directed by	Kiminori Kusano
Written by	Misuzu Chiba
Music by	Kenji Kondō
Studio	Marza Animation Planet
Licensed by	Netflix
Released	July 19, 2024
Episodes	12
- icon

Chi's Sweet Home (Japanese: チーズスイートホーム, Hepburn: Chīzu Suīto Hōmu) is a Japanese manga series written and illustrated by Konami Kanata. It was serialized in Kodansha's seinen manga magazine Morning from 2004 to 2015, with its chapters collected in twelve tankōbon volumes. The manga has been licensed for North American distribution by the publisher Vertical. An anime television series adaptation, lasting two seasons, aired from March 2008 to September 2009. A 3DCG anime television adaptation lasting two seasons began airing in October 2016 to September 2018, and a third season premiered worldwide on Netflix in July 2024.

== Plot ==
A small grey and white American Shorthair kitten wanders away from her mother and siblings one day while enjoying a walk outside with her family. Lost in her surroundings, the kitten struggles to find her family and instead is found by a young boy, Yohei, and his mother, Miwa. They take the kitten home, but, as pets are not allowed in their housing complex, they try to find her a new home. This proves to be difficult, and the family decides to keep the kitten and so must hide it from the landlady.

While being housebroken, the kitten mistakenly answers to "Chi" (from chī (ちー), a Japanese word for "urine") and this becomes her name. Chi then lives with her new family, learning about different things and meeting new people and animals.

== Characters ==
=== Yamada family ===
Chi (チー)
Voiced by: Satomi Kōrogi
Chi is a small grey and white kitten with large eyes, an American Shorthair breed. She is easily distracted and does not have much experience of the world. Chi is particularly attracted to small moving objects, but is scared by larger animals, especially dogs. Although her speech is audible to the viewers, the Yamadas cannot hear her talk. It is revealed that the name her mother gave her is Sarah (セーラ).
Yohei Yamada (山田 ヨウヘイ, Yamada Yōhei)
Voiced by: Etsuko Kozakura (first voice), Ryoko Shiraishi (second voice)
Yohei is a little boy who finds Chi when she gets lost. He is cheerful, kind, obedient, and fond of toys.
Mom (おかあさん, Okaasan)/Miwa Yamada (山田 ミワ, Yamada Miwa)
Voiced by: Noriko Hidaka (first voice), Maaya Sakamoto (second voice)
Miwa is a housewife. She often stays home with Yohei and Chi.
Dad (おとうさん, Otousan)/Kento Yamada (山田 ケント, Yamada Kento)
Voiced by: Hidenobu Kiuchi (first voice), Makoto Yasumura (second voice)
Kento is the source of income, a graphic designer who often works from home. He is very fond of Chi and wants her to like him in return, but he is often called upon to do things that make her angry with him such as taking her to the vet or trimming her claws.

== Media ==
=== Manga ===
Written and illustrated by Konami Kanata, Chi's Sweet Home was serialized in Kodansha's seinen manga magazine Morning from January 8, 2004, (Note: It debuted in the magazine's sixth issue of 2004, released on January 8 of that same year.) to June 18, 2015. Kodansha collected its chapters in twelve tankōbon volumes, released from November 22, 2004, to June 23, 2015. In contrast to the serialized version, which is black and white, the tankōbon version is in full color.

In North America, the manga was licensed for English release by Vertical and published in a left-to-right orientation instead of the original right-to-left one. The twelve volumes were released from June 29, 2010, to November 3, 2015.

A four-volume series by Kinoko Natsume and Kanata, titled Chi's Sweet Adventures (今日のこねこのチー, Kyō no Koneko no Chi), was published on BomBom TV's Twitter account from October 2, 2016, to September 30, 2017. Kodansha collected its chapters in four volumes, released from March 23, 2017, to April 23, 2018. Kodansha USA published the volumes in English from May 1, 2018, to May 28, 2019.

Another series by Konami and Catherine Bouvier, titled Chi en France: Chi's Sweet Home France-ban (Chi en France ～『チーズスイートホーム』フランス版～), started on Kodansha's Comic Days online platform on September 23, 2024.

=== Anime ===
The anime series is directed by Mitsuyuki Masuhara and produced by Madhouse aired from March 31 to September 25, 2008. The episodes are about 3 minutes long and equivalent to one chapter from the manga. The opening theme is "Ouchi ga Ichiban" (おうちがいちばん; 'Home is the Best!') by Satomi Kōrogi.

A second season, Chi's New Address (チーズスイートホーム あたらしいおうち, Chīzu Suīto Hōmu Atarashī Ouchi), aired from March 30 to September 24, 2009. The opening theme is "Chiisana Daibouken" (チーさな大冒険; 'Little Big Adventure') by Rica Matsumoto.

In April 2016, it was announced that the manga would receive a 3DCG anime television adaptation by Marza Animation Planet. Titled Chi's Sweet Adventure (こねこのチー ポンポンらー大冒険, Koneko no Chī: Ponpon-rā Daibōken), the series aired from October 2, 2016, to September 24, 2017. The opening theme is "Nee" by Perfume. A second season simply titled Chi's Sweet Adventure: Season 2 (こねこのチー ポンポンらー大旅行, Koneko no Chī: Ponpon-rā Dairyokō), aired from April 8 to September 30, 2018. The ending theme is "Nya-Oh!" (にゃーお！; 'Meow!') by Wi-Fi-5. An English-dubbed version of the first season streamed on Amazon Prime Video on April 21, 2018.

A third season, Chi's Sweet Adventure: Summer Vacation (こねこのチー ポンポンらー夏休み, Koneko no Chī: Ponpon-rā Natsuyasumi) premiered worldwide on Netflix on July 19, 2024. The opening theme is "Follow my heart" (心まかせ) by kobasolo and kopi, with the ending theme being "Myr" by Riko Tanaka.

==== Episodes ====
===== Season 1 (2008) =====
No.	Title	Original release date
1	"Chi Gets Lost"; Transliteration: "Chī, maigo ni naru" (Japanese: チー、迷子になる。)	March 31, 2008
Chi ends up lost when walking with her family.
2	"Chi Is Picked Up"; Transliteration: "Chī, hirowareru" (Japanese: チー、拾われる。)	April 1, 2008
Chi is found by a young boy and his mother.
3	"Chi Has a Tough Time"; Transliteration: "Chī, hidoi me ni au" (Japanese: チー、ひどい目にあう。)	April 2, 2008
Mr and Mrs Yamada try to give Chi a bath.
4	"Chi Forgets"; Transliteration: "Chī, wasureru" (Japanese: チー、忘れる。)	April 3, 2008
Chi wants to go home, but is distracted by a number of new experiences.
5	"Chi Begins"; Transliteration: "Chī, hajimeru" (Japanese: チー、始める。)	April 7, 2008
Settling into her new home, Chi struggles to understand where the toilet is.
6	"Chi Continues"; Transliteration: "Chī, tsuzukeru" (Japanese: チー、続ける。)	April 8, 2008
After Chi mistakes his bag for a toilet, Mr. Yamada sets out to buy a litter box for her.
7	"Chi Gets Disappointed"; Transliteration: "Chī, gakkari suru" (Japanese: チー、がっかりする。)	April 9, 2008
The newspaper Chi was playing on is replaced with a litter box.
8	"Chi Understands"; Transliteration: "Chī, rikai suru" (Japanese: チー、理解する。)	April 10, 2008
Chi believes she understands why people say a certain word to her a lot.
9	"Chi Remembers"; Transliteration: "Chī, omoidasu" (Japanese: チー、思い出す。)	April 14, 2008
Chi remembers her mother and tries to go out and find her.
10	"Chi Dreams"; Transliteration: "Chī, yumewomiru" (Japanese: チー、夢を見る。)	April 15, 2008
Asleep after a long day, Chi has dreams and nightmares about her past.
11	"Chi Is Adopted"; Transliteration: "Chī, hikitorareru" (Japanese: チー、引き取られる。)	April 16, 2008
The Yamadas believe they have found a new owner for Chi, but Chi is not so sure.
12	"Chi Decides"; Transliteration: "Chī, kimaru" (Japanese: チー、決まる。)	April 17, 2008
The Yamadas decide they will keep Chi themselves as they can not give her to anyone.
13	"Chi Gets Excited"; Transliteration: "Chī, koufun suru" (Japanese: チー、興奮する。)	April 21, 2008
Yohei is told to clear up some bouncy balls, but Chi knocks them down.
14	"Chi Accepts"; Transliteration: "Chī, morau" (Japanese: チー、もらう。)	April 22, 2008
Mr. Yamada worries that Chi does not have any toys.
15	"Chi Plays"; Transliteration: "Chī, asobu" (Japanese: チー、遊ぶ。)	April 23, 2008
Chi has a bundle of new toys, but does not know what to do with them.
16	"Chi Gets in the Way"; Transliteration: "Chī, jama suru" (Japanese: チー、邪魔する。)	April 24, 2008
Mr. Yamada is trying to work. Chi has other ideas.
17	"Chi Runs Away"; Transliteration: "Chī, nigedasu" (Japanese: チー、逃げ出す。)	April 28, 2008
After Mrs. Yamada frightens her, Chi dashes out of the apartment.
18	"Chi Takes a Walk"; Transliteration: "Chī, sanpo suru" (Japanese: チー、散歩する。)	April 29, 2008
Chi discovers the world outside the apartment.
19	"Chi Explores"; Transliteration: "Chī, tanken suru" (Japanese: チー、探検する。)	April 30, 2008
While Yohei searches for her outside, Chi has fun discovering the local park.
20	"Chi Is Left Alone"; Transliteration: "Chī, futatabi maigo ni naru" (Japanese: チー、再び迷子になる。)	May 1, 2008
The park becomes lonely and scary at night.
21	"Chi Goes to the Hospital (Part 1)"; Transliteration: "Chī, byouin ni iku – zenpen" (Japanese: チー、病院に行く。(前編))	May 5, 2008
It's time for Chi's health checkup, but how to smuggle her out?
22	"Chi Goes to the Hospital (Part 2)"; Transliteration: "Chī, byouin ni iku – chuhen" (Japanese: チー、病院に行く。(中編))	May 6, 2008
The landlady nearly spots Chi, but Yohei's quick thinking saves the day.
23	"Chi Goes to the Hospital (Part 3)"; Transliteration: "Chī, byouin ni iku – kouhen" (Japanese: チー、病院に行く。(後編))	May 7, 2008
Chi's first medical check-up is a traumatic experience.
24	"Chi Hates"; Transliteration: "Chī, iyagaru" (Japanese: チー、嫌がる。)	May 8, 2008
Chi is afraid that Mr. Yamada wants to take her for another check-up, and will not come near him.
25	"Chi Obsesses"; Transliteration: "Chī, kodawaru" (Japanese: チー、こだわる。)	May 12, 2008
Chi wants to scratch something. Unfortunately, her objects of choice are very expensive.
26	"Chi Chooses"; Transliteration: "Chī, erabu" (Japanese: チー、選ぶ。)	May 13, 2008
Mr. Yamada gets a new pair of jeans, but Chi prefers the old ones.
27	"Chi Misunderstands"; Transliteration: "Chī, gokai suru" (Japanese: チー、誤解する。)	May 14, 2008
The Yamadas buy Chi a board to scratch, but she is not sure what it's meant to do.
28	"Chi Gets Her Claws Clipped"; Transliteration: "Chī, tsume wo kirareru" (Japanese: チー、爪を切られる。)	May 15, 2008
Mr. Yamada undertakes the dangerous mission of clipping Chi's claws.
29	"Chi Prevents from Leaving"; Transliteration: "Chī, ashidome suru" (Japanese: チー、足止めする。)	May 19, 2008
Mrs. Yamada needs to go shopping, but Chi wants to come along for the ride.
30	"Chi Is Lured"; Transliteration: "Chī, tsurareru" (Japanese: チー、釣られる。)	May 20, 2008
Things are inexplicably boring around Chi's house, and dinner is unusually large... a conspiracy is afoot to help her become independent.
31	"Chi House Sits (Part 1)"; Transliteration: "Chī, rusuban suru (zenpen)" (Japanese: チー、留守番する。(前編))	May 21, 2008
It's Chi's first day home alone, but Mr. Yamada is worried about her.
32	"Chi House Sits (Part 2)"; Transliteration: "Chī, rusuban suru (kouhen)" (Japanese: チー、留守番する。(後編))	May 22, 2008
Chi learns that an apartment without humans in it is not as delightful as it seemed.
33	"Chi Finds"; Transliteration: "Chī, mitsukeru" (Japanese: チー、見つける。)	May 26, 2008
Mrs. Yamada needs to take out the trash, but Chi clings to the bag. Mrs. Yamada distracts Chi with a ball, but while Mrs. Yamada is out, Chi climbs to a window and is almost seen.
34	"Chi Wants to See"; Transliteration: "Chī, mitagaru" (Japanese: チー、見たがる。)	May 27, 2008
Mrs. Yamada takes away the books and boxes so Chi can not climb to the window. However, when Chi jumps, she is just a few centimeters short of reaching the windowsill.
35	"Chi Sees"; Transliteration: "Chī, miru" (Japanese: チー、見る。)	May 28, 2008
Chi is able to jump up to the windowsill, so Mrs. Yamada closes the door to Mr. Yamada's workroom. This angers Chi. Mr. Yamada buys a stuffed animal.
36	"Chi Is Found"; Transliteration: "Chī, mitsuke rareru" (Japanese: チー、見つけられる。)	May 29, 2008
When talking with some neighbors outside, Mrs. Yamada thinks they've seen Chi in the window. However, it was the stuffed animal that Mr. Yamada bought. So, they buy more stuffed animals to put on the windowsill so Chi blends in.
37	"Chi Is Deeply Moved"; Transliteration: "Chī, kando suru" (Japanese: チー、感動する。)	June 2, 2008
Chi searches for a delicious snack, then later eats Yohei's pancakes and finds them delicious.
38	"Chi Has a Quarrel"; Transliteration: "Chī, kenka suru" (Japanese: チー、けんかする。)	June 3, 2008
Chi thinks that everything Yohei plays with is prey. So, Yohei tries to find things Chi will not like, but only makes Chi happier and then she rubs against Yohei's hand.
39	"Chi Takes a Bath"; Transliteration: "Chī, ofuronihairu" (Japanese: チー、お風呂に入る。)	June 4, 2008
Chi becomes suspicious of how much fun Yohei and Dad are having fun in the bath, so she goes in to see what they are doing. After Yohei pours toys in the tub, Chi looks over them and wants to play but unfortunately falls into the tub.
40	"Chi Has a Showdown"; Transliteration: "Chī wa taiketsu suru" (Japanese: チー、対決する。)	June 5, 2008
Yohei and Chi are both annoying each other with their bad sleeping postures, then later sleep comfortable together.
41	"Chi Stands Firm"; Transliteration: "Chī, katamaru" (Japanese: チー、固まる。)	June 9, 2008
While Chi and Yohei are playing in the sand box, a large black cat appears from behind the bushes so they run inside and the black cat walks into their home.
42	"Chi Encounters"; Transliteration: "Chī, deau" (Japanese: チー、出会う。)	June 10, 2008
The black cat appears again in the Yamada house and eats Chi's dinner while the others are away.
43	"Chi is Edible"; Transliteration: "Chī, taberareru" (Japanese: チー、食べられる。)	June 11, 2008
After eating Chi's dinner, the black cat picks her up and walks over to take her chew toy and Chi tries to protect it. Then the black cat decides to groom Chi's back and so Chi realizes the cat is not as mean as it looks. And leaves once again into the bushes.
44	"Chi Reports"; Transliteration: "Chī, hokoku suru" (Japanese: チー、報告する。)	June 12, 2008
Everyone tells Dad about the large black cat at dinner.
45	"Chi Gets Attention"; Transliteration: "Chī, chuiwohiku" (Japanese: チー、注意を引く。)	June 16, 2008
Chi wants to play with everyone but everyone is too busy. Once they all come together to play with her, she dislikes the attention and walks away.
46	"Chi Collects Interest"; Transliteration: "Chī, kanshin o atsumeru" (Japanese: チー、関心を集める。)	June 17, 2008
Chi tries to grab the Yamada family's attention when they sit together and discuss how they should go to Kyoto after seeing a postcard from Grandma.
47	"Chi Sticks"; Transliteration: "Chī, kuttsuku" (Japanese: チー、くっつく。)	June 18, 2008
Chi is house sitting again and gets her tail stuck to a roll of tape.
48	"Chi Feigns Ignorance"; Transliteration: "Chī, shiranpuri suru" (Japanese: チー、知らんぷりする。)	June 19, 2008
Chi tries to remove the tape off her tail, and in the process she wrecks Dad's room.
49	"Chi Pursues"; Transliteration: "Chī, tsuiseki suru" (Japanese: チー、追跡する。)	June 23, 2008
Chi follows the black cat and talks to it.
50	"Chi Learns"; Transliteration: "Chī, oboeru" (Japanese: チー、覚える。)	June 24, 2008
The black cat hides Chi from a dog, then later tells her that she is a cat.
51	"Chi Practices"; Transliteration: "Chī, jissen suru" (Japanese: チー、実践する。)	June 25, 2008
Chi hides from a dog, then can not find her way home.
52	"Chi Goes Home"; Transliteration: "Chī, o ienikaeru" (Japanese: チー、お家に帰る。)	June 26, 2008
Chi returns home by taking advice from the big black cat by looking at the sky.
53	"Chi Rebels"; Transliteration: "Chī, hanko suru" (Japanese: チー、反抗する。)	June 30, 2008
Dad tries to take Chi to the vet, so she runs outside. The land lady almost sees her until the black cat jumps out of a window saving the Yamada family and Chi.
54	"Chi Resists"; Transliteration: "Chī, teiko suru" (Japanese: チー、抵抗する。)	July 1, 2008
Dad brings out the basket to take Chi to the vet, but Chi knows the basket means she is going to the vet so she runs away every time they try to put her in there. Until she traps herself and Yohei catches her.
55	"Chi Grows Timid"; Transliteration: "Chī, ijikeru" (Japanese: チー、いじける。)	July 2, 2008
Chi goes to the vet after Yohei captures her. When she returns home the black cat tells her not to trust humans, but Chi does not know what trust is.
56	"Chi Finds Comrades"; Transliteration: "Chī, nakama o mitsukeru" (Japanese: チー、仲間を見つける。)	July 3, 2008
Chi returns home just to eat, but gets a treat of Tuna of tells the Yamada family to be her comrades.
57	"Chi Gets Excited"; Transliteration: "Chī, wakuwakusuru" (Japanese: チー、ワクワクする。)	July 7, 2008
There's a storm coming to the Yamada home.
58	"Chi Gets Thrown Out"; Transliteration: "Chī, oidasa reru" (Japanese: チー、追い出される。)	July 8, 2008
When Yohei goes outside to get his toy truck from being swept by the storm, Chi is left outside.
59	"Chi Surprises"; Transliteration: "Chī, odoroku" (Japanese: チー、おどろく。)	July 9, 2008
Dad finds Chi outside the window in the storm.
60	"Chi Chases"; Transliteration: "Chī, oikakeru" (Japanese: チー、追いかける。)	July 10, 2008
The power goes out in the Yamada house, so Dad brings out the flashlight and Chi chases it, then Mom and Yohei all play with Chi with the flashlight in the dark.
61	"Chi Cuddles"; Transliteration: "Chī, yori so" (Japanese: チー、よりそう。)	July 14, 2008
Yohei becomes ill, but Chi still wants to play. So she stands over him while he sleeps, then eventually cuddles and sleeps next to him.
62	"Chi Stays Close"; Transliteration: "Chī, soba ni iru" (Japanese: チー、そばに居る。)	July 15, 2008
Mom becomes sick so Yohei tries to help her.
63	"Chi Turns Around"; Transliteration: "Chī, furimawasu" (Japanese: チー、ふりまわす。)	July 16, 2008
After Yohei and Mom are no longer ill, Dad catches a cold.
64	"Chi Annoys"; Transliteration: "Chī, komara seru" (Japanese: チー、困らせる。)	July 17, 2008
Dad is trying to get better but all Chi wants to do is play.
65	"Chi Wants"; Transliteration: "Chī, hoshi garu" (Japanese: チー、ほしがる。)	July 21, 2008
Chi tries a tasty cat treat and refuses to eat her dinner.
66	"Chi Sulks"; Transliteration: "Chī, futekusareru" (Japanese: チー、ふてくされる。)	July 22, 2008
Yohei and Dad are out, so Mom catches up on some housework and accidentally scares Chi while cleaning the floors, so she bribes her with snacks.
67	"Chi Finds"; Transliteration: "Chī, sagashiateru" (Japanese: チー、探しあてる。)	July 23, 2008
While getting ready to go out Mrs. Yamada loses her ring, Chi then helps her find her ring
68	"Chi Kneads"; Transliteration: "Chī, fumi fumi suru" (Japanese: チー、ふみふみする。)	July 24, 2008
Chi looks for a place to nap, then ends up kneading and falling asleep on Mrs. Yamada
69	"Chi Thinks"; Transliteration: "Chī, atama o tsukau" (Japanese: チー、頭をつかう。)	July 28, 2008
Chi gets a taste of milk and ends up wanting more, so she tries to think of a way to get more, but ends up eventually forgetting about the milk while playing with a plastic bag.
70	"Chi Tastes"; Transliteration: "Chī, ajimi suru" (Japanese: チー、味見する。)	July 29, 2008
The Yamadas decide to make a meal for Chi, but when they give it to her they forget to let the meal cool off.
71	"Chi Overeats"; Transliteration: "Chī, tabe sugiru" (Japanese: チー、食べすぎる。)	July 30, 2008
Chi finds where her food is stored and ends up eating all she wants. Mr. and Mrs. Yamada then worry if she is sick.
72	"Chi Hangs Around"; Transliteration: "Chī, kakomu" (Japanese: チー、囲む。)	July 31, 2008
While the Yamadas eat dinner they end up giving bits of their food to Chi which makes her believe all food on the table is yummy. To make her stop begging for their food they put her cat food dish on the table.
73	"Chi Sheds"; Transliteration: "Chī, ke o tobasu" (Japanese: チー、毛を飛ばす。)	August 4, 2008
Chi's shedding season has started leaving fur all over the house. Then a woman from the neighborhood stops by, so the Yamadas have to hide Chi and all her fur as well!
74	"Chi Gets Brushed"; Transliteration: "Chī, burasshingu sa reru" (Japanese: チー、ブラッシングされる。)	August 5, 2008
Chi's shedding so Mr. Yamada decides to buy a brush for Chi. Chi ignores Mr. Yamada's attempt to brush her a first but once he starts she really likes being combed!
75	"Chi Likes"; Transliteration: "Chī, sukininaru" (Japanese: チー、好きになる。)	August 6, 2008
Chi really likes being brushed so she ends up following Mr. Yamada everywhere asking to be brushed. Chi ends up getting brushed so often that Mr. Yamada's arm starts to get tired.
76	"Chi Breaks"; Transliteration: "Chī, kowasu" (Japanese: チー、壊す。)	August 7, 2008
After being brushed Chi leaves fur on the brush which Yohei then collects until he has enough for a large ball. When Mr. Yamada discovers what Yohei has been doing the family talks about it until Chi grabs the ball of fur and starts to play with it sending fur flying everywhere
77	"Chi Doesn't Get It"; Transliteration: "Chī, kamiawanai" (Japanese: チー、噛み合わない。)	August 11, 2008
Chi and Yohei both want to play but seem to have different definitions of fun, Mrs. Yamada then tells them to clean up so they can have snacks.
78	"Chi Hides"; Transliteration: "Chī, kakusu" (Japanese: チー、隠す。)	August 12, 2008
Chi and Yohei decide to play hide-and-seek.
79	"Chi Hides Some More"; Transliteration: "Chī, motto kakusu" (Japanese: チー、もっと隠す。)	August 13, 2008
Playing hide-and-seek with Yohei, Chi hides in a dresser drawer, but when Yohei goes to have a snack he forgets about finding Chi.
80	"Chi Is Found"; Transliteration: "Chī, mitsukaru" (Japanese: チー、見つかる。)	August 14, 2008
Yohei remembers the game of hide-and-seek and the Yamadas start looking for Chi, while Chi wakes up and tries to escape the drawer.
81	"Chi Learns"; Transliteration: "Chī, osowaru" (Japanese: チー、教わる。)	August 18, 2008
Chi learns how to open the screen door when the black bear cat shows her how, Chi also learns How to mark her territory and hunt prey.
82	"Chi Fails"; Transliteration: "Chī, shippai suru" (Japanese: チー、失敗する。)	August 19, 2008
Chi continues to follow the black bear cat, then chases pigeons. No matter what Chi does shes can not catch any pigeons
83	"Chi Plays a Game"; Transliteration: "Chī, shobu suru" (Japanese: チー、勝負する。)	August 20, 2008
Chi chases pigeons while the black bear cat watches but she can not catch any. After being laughed at by a pigeons, the black bear cat tells Chi to sneak up on the pigeons using the bushes.
84	"Chi Is Seen"; Transliteration: "Chī, mokugeki sa reru" (Japanese: チー、目撃される。)	August 21, 2008
While Chi and the black bear cat head home, they spot another cat urinating on a car. Black bear cat, furious because the car is part of his territory, chases the other cat away. Unfortunately, the car's owner sees the urine on his bumper and blames the black bear cat. Chi and the black bear cat are forced to flee to Chi's house.
85	"Chi Opens"; Transliteration: "Chī, akeru" (Japanese: チー、開ける。)	August 25, 2008
Chi opens the screen door and tries to go outside when Yohei stops her. As the Yamadas try to figure out why the screen door was left opens they then watch as Chi opens the screen door again and tries to escape, again.
86	"Chi Hides"; Transliteration: "Chī, kakureru" (Japanese: チー、隠れる。)	August 26, 2008
The landlady drops by for a visit so the Yamadas must hide Chi from her.
87	"Chi Hides More"; Transliteration: "Chī, motto kakureru" (Japanese: チー、もっと隠れる。)	August 27, 2008
With the landlady visiting, Youkei and Chi hide in the bathroom but because Chi wants to play, the Yamadas have to try to make up excuses so she does not find Chi.
88	"Chi Makes Peace"; Transliteration: "Chī, chusai suru" (Japanese: チー、仲裁する。)	August 28, 2008
Mr. and Mrs. Yamada discuss what they should do with Chi but Chi keeps distracting them by wanting to play.
89	"Chi Is Photographed"; Transliteration: "Chī, tora reru" (Japanese: チー、撮られる。)	September 1, 2008
Mr. Yamada wants to take a picture of Chi but every time he is about to take the picture Chi moves, so when they finally get her to look at the camera, Chi really does not like the flash.
90	"Chi Is Attacked"; Transliteration: "Chī, shugeki sa reru" (Japanese: チー、襲撃される。)	September 2, 2008
Juri comes over for a visit but Chi does not seem to happy about her coming, deciding she can not let her guard down around Juri.
91	"Chi Is Interested"; Transliteration: "Chī, kiniiru" (Japanese: チー、気に入る。)	September 3, 2008
Juri's brought a Crab with her from her home and Chi's interested in the live crab; Juri decides to pet Chi but is a little too rough.
92	"Chi Hits It Off"; Transliteration: "Chī, ikitogo suru" (Japanese: チー、意気投合する。)	September 4, 2008
Chi's taken a liking to Juri and they start playing, leaving Yohei feeling left out.
93	"Chi Learns"; Transliteration: "Chī, narau" (Japanese: チー、習う。)	September 8, 2008
Chi follows the black bear cat outside; the black bear cat and Chi try to steal food but end up being seen by the landlady and another resident.
94	"Chi Is Cornered"; Transliteration: "Chī, oitsume rareru" (Japanese: チー、追いつめられる。)	September 9, 2008
Chi and the black bear cat escape from the landlady and are chased outside, meanwhile Yohei and Mrs. Yamada look for Chi and end up seeing Chi and the black bear cat's escape.
95	"Chi Rests"; Transliteration: "Chī, kyukei suru" (Japanese: チー、休憩する。)	September 10, 2008
Chi and the black bear cat escape from the landlady by taking refuge in the black bear cat's home, But the landlady finds out where the black bear cat is staying so they have to escape out the window. Yohei and Mrs. Yamada continue to follow Chi's trail.
96	"Chi Learns"; Transliteration: "Chī, manabu" (Japanese: チー、学ぶ。)	September 11, 2008
Chi must jump out the window to the roof of another building but is too scared to do so, so the black bear cat tells her to "smile and look forward" giving her the courage to jump. Then while Chi and the black bear cat are getting down from the roof using a tree, Yohei seeing the black bear cat helping Chi.
97	"Chi Strives"; Transliteration: "Chī, hagemu" (Japanese: チー、励む。)	September 15, 2008
The Yamadas discuss how Chi was seen by the landlady, while Chi climbs the curtains and ends up stuck and tangled.
98	"Chi Desires"; Transliteration: "Chī, setsubo suru" (Japanese: チー、切望する。)	September 16, 2008
The landlady sends out a notice stating that pets are forbidden in the apartments but Chi wants to go outside and visit the black bear cat.
99	"Chi Waits"; Transliteration: "Chī, matsu" (Japanese: チー、待つ。)	September 17, 2008
Chi is sad that she is not allowed to go outside and play with the black bear cat so Chi waits by the door all day wishing to go out, while Mr. and Mrs. Yamada discuss whats best for Chi.
100	"Chi Begs"; Transliteration: "Chī, kongan suru" (Japanese: チー、懇願する。)	September 18, 2008
Chi is sad and staring at the Moon wanting to go outside when the black bear cat appears at the door, Chi then begs Yohei to open the door so that Chi can play with the black bear cat and Yohei gives in and opens the door making Chi happy.
101	"Chi Promises"; Transliteration: "Chī, yakusoku suru" (Japanese: チー、約束する。)	September 22, 2008
The black bear cat brings Chi a "souvenir" and plays with her. Then as the black bear cat leaves Chi asks for the black bear cat to play with her again later and the black bear cat agrees, then leaves.
102	"Chi Sees Off"; Transliteration: "Chī, miokuru" (Japanese: チー、見送る。)	September 23, 2008
The Yamadas and Chi watch as the black bear cat and his family pack up and move and as the black bear cat leaves Chi does not realize the black bear cat is moving.
103	"Chi Cries"; Transliteration: "Chī, naku" (Japanese: チー、泣く。)	September 24, 2008
The black bear cat moves away so Chi is sad.
104	"Chi Discovers"; Transliteration: "Chī, hakken suru" (Japanese: チー、発見する。)	September 25, 2008
Chi discovers that the black bear cat is still there, she just can not see him.

===== Season 2 (2009) =====
No.	Title	Original release date
1	"Chi Goes West"; Transliteration: "Chī, motomeru" (Japanese: チー、求める)	March 30, 2009
The Yamada family talks about whether they should send Chi to Juri in Hokkaido or not.
2	"Chi is Taken Away"; Transliteration: "Chī, tsurete ikareru" (Japanese: チー、連れて行かれる。)	March 31, 2009
Dad dreams that Chi is taken away to Hokkaido by Juri.
3	"Chi Runs Away"; Transliteration: "Chī, iede suru" (Japanese: チー、家出する。)	April 1, 2009
Youhei overhears Mom and Dad talking about sending Chi away and runs away with her. Chi runs from Youhei when he is talking with his parents in the park and chases a bird.
4	"Chi Decides Again"; Transliteration: "Chī, mou ichido kimaru" (Japanese: チー、もう一度決まる。)	April 2, 2009
Chi comes back to the family, and they decide that instead of sending her away, they will move to a house where pets are allowed.
5	"Chi Prepares"; Transliteration: "Chī, junbi suru" (Japanese: チー、準備する。)	April 3, 2009
The Yamada family packs their belongings while Chi is trapped in a box without their knowing.
6	"Chi Imagines"; Transliteration: "Chī, souzou suru" (Japanese: チー、想像する。)	April 6, 2009
Chi is isolated in the bathroom while the movers take the boxes and imagines all the bad things the noises would be.
7	"Chi Reminisced"; Transliteration: "Chī, omoidasa reru" (Japanese: チー、思い出される。)	April 7, 2009
Chi comes out of the bathroom and goes to new home with the Yamada family.
8	"Chi Moves"; Transliteration: "Chī, hikkosu" (Japanese: チー、引っ越す。)	April 8, 2009
The Yamada family takes Chi to the new home, but Chi does not want to come out of the box, thinking it is the animal hospital.
9	"Chi Smells Things"; Transliteration: "Chī, kagu" (Japanese: チー、嗅ぐ。)	April 13, 2009
While Chi is in the new home, she picks up strange smells around the house. She wants to return to the old house.
10	"Chi Goes Exploring"; Transliteration: "Chī, kaitaku suru" (Japanese: チー、開拓する。)	April 14, 2009
Chi makes everything in her new home smell like her.
11	"Chi Goes Climbing"; Transliteration: "Chī, noboru" (Japanese: チー、登る。)	April 15, 2009
Chi climbs up the stairs.
12	"Chi Frets"; Transliteration: "Chī, nayamu" (Japanese: チー、悩む。)	April 16, 2009
Chi sadly wonders if her new home is alright to her.
13	"Chi Has an Idea"; Transliteration: "Chī, hasso suru" (Japanese: チー、発想する。)	April 20, 2009
Chi figures out how to use the kitty-door.
14	"Chi Says Hello (Part 1)"; Transliteration: "Chī, aisatsu suru (zenpen)" (Japanese: チー、挨拶する。（前編）)	April 21, 2009
Chi and the Yamadas visit their new neighbors, Akashi who owns a parakeet, Lucky, and Furukawa who owns a rabbit, Mi-chan.
15	"Chi Says Hello (Part 2)"; Transliteration: "Chī, aisatsu suru (kohen)" (Japanese: チー、挨拶する。（後編）)	April 22, 2009
Chi and the Yamadas continue to meet their new neighbors, including a woman named Ijyuin with a golden long-haired cat named Alice.
16	"Chi Challenged!"; Transliteration: "Chī, idomu" (Japanese: チー、挑む。)	April 23, 2009
Chi and the Yamadas meet their next-door neighbor, Kusano Yuki with a dog, David.
17	"Chi Goes Into the Yard"; Transliteration: "Chī, niwa ni deru chi" (Japanese: チー、庭に出る。)	April 27, 2009
Chi finally goes outside to her new backyard.
18	"Chi Gets Even"; Transliteration: "Chī, shikaeshi suru" (Japanese: チー、仕返しする。)	April 28, 2009
Chi is not happy with the dog David from next door, but discovers that David can not come in her backyard.
19	"Chi Welcomes"; Transliteration: "Chī, mukaeru" (Japanese: チー、迎える。)	April 29, 2009
Chi's neighbor Alice comes into her home.
20	"Chi Frolics About"; Transliteration: "Chī, tawamureru" (Japanese: チー、たわむれる。)	April 30, 2009
Chi chases a butterfly and goes into the Kusano's yard.
21	"Chi Goes Outside"; Transliteration: "Chī, gai ni deru" (Japanese: チー、外に出る。)	May 4, 2009
Chi discovers the outside of her yard.
22	"Chi Gets Dizzy"; Transliteration: "Chī, ukiuki suru" (Japanese: チー、ウキウキする。)	May 5, 2009
Chi follows other cats and wanders away from home.
23	"Chi Returns"; Transliteration: "Chī, modoru" (Japanese: チー、戻る。)	May 6, 2009
Chi goes back to her old home but notices something and wonders where her home is.
24	"Chi Is Invited In"; Transliteration: "Chī, sasowareru" (Japanese: チー、誘われる。)	May 7, 2009
Chi meets an orange, black and white cat named Mike and is invited to his house. He asks Chi if she wants to stay at his place instead.
25	"Chi Leaves Pawprints"; Transliteration: "Chī, ato o tsukeru" (Japanese: チー、跡をつける。)	May 11, 2009
Chi comes back from outside and leaves pawprints everywhere at home.
26	"Chi Is Stopped"; Transliteration: "Chī, tomerareru" (Japanese: チー、止められる。)	May 12, 2009
Chi is stopped by the Yamadas from touching many things.
27	"Chi Gets Mad"; Transliteration: "Chī, okoru" (Japanese: チー、怒る。)	May 13, 2009
Youhei invites his friends Mayu and Ryu, and introduces Chi. However, Ryu is scared of cats.
28	"Chi Makes Friends"; Transliteration: "Chī, nakanaori suru" (Japanese: チー、仲直りする。)	May 14, 2009
Chi gets angered by Ryu, and Youhei's friends tries to make up for Chi.
29	"Chi Is Fallen in Love With"; Transliteration: "Chī, natsuka reru" (Japanese: チー、なつかれる。)	May 18, 2009
Chi meets the pet store lady and she falls in love with Chi.
30	"Chi Is Followed"; Transliteration: "Chī, owareru" (Japanese: チー、追われる。)	May 19, 2009
Chi is followed by the pet store lady and loses her. Mr. Yamada brags about Chi to the pet store lady.
31	"Chi Is Carried"; Transliteration: "Chī, showa reru" (Japanese: チー、背負われる。)	May 20, 2009
Chi is carried in a kitty bag and Mr. Yamada comes to the pet store again to bet who is the cutest cat.
32	"Chi Runs Around"; Transliteration: "Chī, hashirimawaru" (Japanese: チー、走り回る。)	May 21, 2009
Chi meets the pet store lady again and escapes from her.
33	"Chi Keeps Waiting"; Transliteration: "Chī, machi tsudzukeru" (Japanese: チー、待ち続ける。)	May 25, 2009
Chi visits the Furukawas, sees Mi-chan the rabbit, and waits.
34	"Chi Is Impersonated"; Transliteration: "Chī, mane sa reru" (Japanese: チー、真似される。)	May 26, 2009
Chi visits the Akashi thinking that Lucky is food but Lucky impersonates Chi.
35	"Chi Goes Through"; Transliteration: "Chī, torinukeru" (Japanese: チー、通り抜ける。)	May 27, 2009
Chi likes to go through things.
36	"Chi Doesn't Sleep"; Transliteration: "Chī, nenai" (Japanese: チー、寝ない。)	May 28, 2009
Chi tries to sleep, and then plays.
37	"Chi Makes Sure Of"; Transliteration: "Chī, mikiwameru" (Japanese: チー、見極める。)	June 1, 2009
Youhei gets his birthday present and Chi likes it.
38	"Chi Tastes"; Transliteration: "Chī, shishoku suru" (Japanese: チー、試食する。)	June 2, 2009
Ms. Yamada gets Youhei's Birthday party ready and hopes Chi does not ruin it.
39	"Chi is Confused"; Transliteration: "Chī, konran suru" (Japanese: チー、混乱する。)	June 3, 2009
Youhei's birthday party begins and Chi is frightened of Youhei's present.
40	"Chi Celebrates"; Transliteration: "Chī, oiwai suru" (Japanese: チー、お祝いする。)	June 4, 2009
Youhei's Birthday party ends and Mr. Yamada has the new pictures developed. The Yamadas realize that it's the first birthday that Chi has ever been to.
41	"Chi Wanders Aimlessly"; Transliteration: "Chī, burarito suru" (Japanese: チー、ぶらりとする。)	June 8, 2009
Chi goes out of her yard again and chases a butterfly. Chi wanders off again, this time to an arcade street.
42	"Chi is Told a Story"; Transliteration: "Chī, katara reru" (Japanese: チー、語られる。)	June 9, 2009
Chi is rescued by a cat with a ribbon around its neck named Tama, and Tama keeps telling Chi to be careful.
43	"Chi Makes Her Debut"; Transliteration: "Chī, debyū suru" (Japanese: チー、デビューする。)	June 10, 2009
Chi follows Tama to a cat meeting for the first time to meet other cats, including the elder cat Fuji-San.
44	"Chi Looks Up the Sky"; Transliteration: "Chī, sora o miru" (Japanese: チー、空を見る。)	June 11, 2009
The cat meeting begins, and Fuji-San just says comforting things to the cats.
45	"Chi Is Treated"; Transliteration: "Chī, motenasa reru" (Japanese: チー、もてなされる。)	June 15, 2009
Chi visits Ijyuin's place to see Alice.
46	"Chi Is Washed"; Transliteration: "Chī, arawa reru" (Japanese: チー、洗われる。)	June 16, 2009
Mrs. Yamada takes Chi to a pet salon for the first time with Ijyuin and Alice.
47	"Chi Is Opened Up"; Transliteration: "Chī, hirake rareru" (Japanese: チー、開けられる。)	June 17, 2009
Mr. Yamada tries to open Chi's mouth to brush her teeth.
48	"Chi Brushes Her Teeth"; Transliteration: "Chī, hawomigaku" (Japanese: チー、歯を磨く。)	June 18, 2009
Mr. Yamada buys stuff from the pet store and again tries to brush Chi's teeth.
49	"Chi Is Tested"; Transliteration: "Chī, tamesa reru" (Japanese: チー、試される。)	June 22, 2009
The Yamadas want to go on a trip but are afraid that Chi cannot come, so Mr. Yamada and Youhei take Chi to ride a bus first.
50	"Chi Gets In The Car"; Transliteration: "Chī, noru" (Japanese: チー、乗る。)	June 23, 2009
The Yamadas want to go on a trip with Chi and so they decide to get a car.
51	"Chi Speeds Off"; Transliteration: "Chī, hashiru" (Japanese: チー、走る。)	June 24, 2009
The Yamadas drive their new car around the neighborhood with Chi.
52	"Chi Goes Home"; Transliteration: "Chī, kaeru" (Japanese: チー、帰る。)	June 25, 2009
Mr. Yamada is getting used to driving, and they go to a drive-through to get lunch. Then Chi gets out through the window.
53	"Chi Rolls Around"; Transliteration: "Chī, korogasu" (Japanese: チー、転がす。)	June 29, 2009
The Yamadas decide to go play tennis while Chi plays with tennis balls.
54	"Chi Runs About Here and There"; Transliteration: "Chī, nigemadou" (Japanese: チー、逃げ惑う。)	June 30, 2009
Mr. and Mrs. Yamada plays tennis with each other and Chi wants to play with the tennis ball.
55	"Chi Dives"; Transliteration: "Chī, mo guru" (Japanese: チー、もぐる。)	July 1, 2009
Chi goes to Fuji-San's house.
56	"Chi Is Admired"; Transliteration: "Chī, kanshin sa reru" (Japanese: チー、感心される。)	July 2, 2009
Chi is carried to the cat meeting by Fuji-San and then David scares the other cats.
57	"Chi Trims the Bamboo Tree"; Transliteration: "Chī, sasa o kazaru" (Japanese: チー、笹をかざる。)	July 6, 2009
The Tanabata (Bamboo) Festival comes and the Yamadas get a bamboo tree to decorate, but Chi comes back home.
58	"Chi Wishes Upon a Star"; Transliteration: "Chī, hoshi o negau" (Japanese: チー、星を願う。)	July 7, 2009
Since the bamboo tree is ruined, the Yamadas use a Christmas tree instead, and Youhei makes a wish.
59	"Chi Gets Wet"; Transliteration: "Chī, bishobisho ni naru" (Japanese: チー、びしょびしょになる。)	July 8, 2009
Chi goes out, and then it rains.
60	"Chi Takes Refuge from the Rain"; Transliteration: "Chī, amayadorisuru" (Japanese: チー、雨宿りする。)	July 9, 2009
Chi is carried by Tama and avoids the rain.
61	"Chi Pursues"; Transliteration: "Chī, ou" (Japanese: チー、追う。)	July 13, 2009
Chi tries to catch a fly.
62	"Chi Is Sucked Up"; Transliteration: "Chī, suwa reru" (Japanese: チー、吸われる。)	July 14, 2009
Mrs. Yamada tries to vacuum the house, but Chi does not want to move.
63	"Chi Is in Sync"; Transliteration: "Chī, kamiau" (Japanese: チー、噛み合う。)	July 15, 2009
Chi and Youhei are in sync together.
64	"Chi Rides Out of Danger"; Transliteration: "Chī, norikiru" (Japanese: チー、のりきる。)	July 16, 2009
Youhei and Chi are home alone.
65	"Chi Is Treated"; Transliteration: "Chī, gochiso ni naru" (Japanese: チー、ごちそうになる。)	July 20, 2009
Tama and Alice argue about whose food is better, and Chi acts as the judge.
66	"Chi Is Followed"; Transliteration: "Chī, tsuke rareru" (Japanese: チー、つけられる。)	July 21, 2009
Tama and Alice keep and eye on Chi. As they argue, she wanders off.
67	"Chi Is Discovered"; Transliteration: "Chī, hakken sa reru" (Japanese: チー、発見される。)	July 22, 2009
Chi wanders away and learns how to climb a tree, but can not get down.
68	"Chi Goes Down"; Transliteration: "Chī, oriru" (Japanese: チー、おりる。)	July 23, 2009
Chi is stuck in a tree and Ryu rescues Chi to overcome his fear.
69	"Chi Scoops"; Transliteration: "Chī, suku" (Japanese: チー、すくう。)	July 27, 2009
Summer has come and the Yamadas plan to have nagashi-soumen, which is noodles eaten straight from water flowing through little bamboo canals.
70	"Chi Goes Along"; Transliteration: "Chī, tsure rareru" (Japanese: チー、連れられる。)	July 28, 2009
The Summer Festival has come and it is Chi's first time with Tama.
71	"Chi Experience"; Transliteration: "Chī, keiken suru" (Japanese: チー、経験する。)	July 29, 2009
Chi gets to experience the Summer Festival with Tama.
72	"Chi Looks Up"; Transliteration: "Chī, miageru" (Japanese: チー、見上げる。)	July 30, 2009
Chi and Tama have a good time at the Summer Festival. Chi is found by the Yamadas and looks surprised at the fireworks.
73	"Chi Becomes Popular"; Transliteration: "Chī, ninki-sha ni naru" (Japanese: チー、人気者になる。)	August 3, 2009
Mr. and Mrs. Yamada compete as to who understands Chi the best.
74	"Chi Leaps"; Transliteration: "Chī, tobitsuku" (Japanese: チー、飛びつく。)	August 4, 2009
Ms. Yamada buys Youhei a balloon.
75	"Chi Boasts"; Transliteration: "Chī, jiman suru" (Japanese: チー、じまんする。)	August 5, 2009
Chi follows the dog David, and shows off that she can go anywhere.
76	"Chi Falls Over"; Transliteration: "Chī, korobu" (Japanese: チー、ころぶ。)	August 6, 2009
Chi gets trapped in a garbage can and can not get out.
77	"Chi Crosses the Sea"; Transliteration: "Chī, umi o wataru" (Japanese: チー、海をわたる。)	August 10, 2009
The Yamadas and Chi are going to Hokkaido to visit Juri and her family. They take Chi along for the cruise but Chi has to stay in a cage.
78	"Chi Rides Through Hokkaido"; Transliteration: "Chī, hokkaido o hashiru" (Japanese: チー、北海道を走る。)	August 11, 2009
The Yamadas and Chi arrive in Hokkaido and are headed to Juri and her family's ranch.
79	"Chi Rides a Horse"; Transliteration: "Chī, umaninoru" (Japanese: チー、馬に乗る。)	August 12, 2009
Juri shows Youhei and Chi the horses. Youhei rides together with Juri on a pony while Chi on the other hand has a different ride.
80	"Chi Scares People"; Transliteration: "Chī, kowagara su" (Japanese: チー、こわがらす。)	August 13, 2009
It's bedtime for Youhei and Juri, but Youhei gets scared when Juri says that there are monsters.
81	"Chi Is Surrounded"; Transliteration: "Chī, tori kakoma reru" (Japanese: チー、とり囲まれる。)	August 17, 2009
It's early morning, and the morning crowing from the rooster wakes Chi up. Chi finds herself some prey, and trouble.
82	"Chi Meets a Cow"; Transliteration: "Chī, ushi ni au" (Japanese: チー、牛にあう。)	August 18, 2009
Juri shows Youhei and Chi the barn where they milk cows.
83	"Chi Sees Stars"; Transliteration: "Chī, hoshiwomiru" (Japanese: チー、星を見る。)	August 19, 2009
It is the last day that the Yamadas and Chi are staying. Juri decides to show Youhei and Chi her treasure.
84	"Chi Meets a Northern Fox"; Transliteration: "Chī, kitakitsune ni au" (Japanese: チー、キタキツネにあう。)	August 20, 2009
The Yamadas and Chi finally leave the ranch, but then stop at a sunflower field and decide to take a picture. But then Chi follows a butterfly and meets a Northern Fox.
85	"Chi Is Chaperoned"; Transliteration: "Chī, tsukisou" (Japanese: チー、付き添う。)	August 24, 2009
Mr. Yamada has to work and can not play with Chi; But Chi always cause trouble and can not stay still.
86	"Chi Plays in the Yard"; Transliteration: "Chī, niwa de asobu" (Japanese: チー、庭で遊ぶ。)	August 25, 2009
Kusano Yuki comes over to the Yamadas to play with David. Chi tries to play with David in the yard.
87	"Chi Is Shown Gratitude"; Transliteration: "Chī, kansha sa reru" (Japanese: チー、感謝される。)	August 26, 2009
The pet store lady comes to visit Chi and brings her some pet clothes. When Chi runs away from the pet store lady's dress-up session, Chi finds Youhei with Mrs. Yamada, playing with Mayu and Ryu. When the pet store lady finds her, there's a surprise.
88	"Chi Goes Together"; Transliteration: "Chī, issho ni iku" (Japanese: チー、いっしょに行く。)	August 27, 2009
Chi is going to the cat meeting and Alice comes along and tries to fit in.
89	"Chi Gets Tangled"; Transliteration: "Chī, kara maru" (Japanese: チー、からまる。)	August 31, 2009
Chi's favorite toy is worn out and Ms. Yamada tries to make a homemade toy for Chi to play with.
90	"Chi Has a Meeting"; Transliteration: "Chī, hanashiau" (Japanese: チー、話し合う。)	September 1, 2009
Mr. Yamada is late for an important meeting, but in his haste, unknowingly takes Chi along.
91	"Chi Puts Out a Performance"; Transliteration: "Chī, enso suru" (Japanese: チー、演奏する。)	September 2, 2009
Youhei practices the piano for school and Chi wants to play too.
92	"Chi Sows Seeds"; Transliteration: "Chī, tanemaki o suru" (Japanese: チー、種まきをする。)	September 3, 2009
The Yamadas decided to plant some flowers and Chi wants to play in their newly made garden.
93	"Chi Is Mistaken"; Transliteration: "Chī, machigau" (Japanese: チー、まちがう。)	September 7, 2009
Chi remembers her first friend, the big black cat.
94	"Chi Panics"; Transliteration: "Chī, aseru" (Japanese: チー、あせる。)	September 8, 2009
Chi mistakenly gets into a pickup truck and goes out of town. Chi is lost and can not get home.
95	"Chi Is Surrounded"; Transliteration: "Chī, kakoma reru" (Japanese: チー、囲まれる。)	September 9, 2009
Chi could not find her way home but finds some company led by Tora.
96	"Chi Stays the Night"; Transliteration: "Chī, tomaru" (Japanese: チー、泊まる。)	September 10, 2009
Chi sleeps at Tora and his friend's place but wants to go home.
97	"Chi Conveys a Message"; Transliteration: "Chī, tsutaeru" (Japanese: チー、伝える。)	September 14, 2009
Chi is on her way home until she meets Tama's little sister, Hana.
98	"Chi Continues"; Transliteration: "Chī, susumu" (Japanese: チー、進む。)	September 15, 2009
Chi tries following the sun to find home, but encounters many obstacles. Everyone including the Yamadas continue looking for Chi.
99	"Chi Collapses"; Transliteration: "Chī, taoreru" (Japanese: チー、倒れる。)	September 16, 2009
Chi still can not find her way home and collapsed with exhaustion. The Yamadas have not yet given up searching for Chi.
100	"Chi Reunited"; Transliteration: "Chī, saikai suru" (Japanese: チー、再会する。)	September 17, 2009
Chi meets the big black cat again.
101	"Chi Is Happy"; Transliteration: "Chī, yorokobu" (Japanese: チー、喜ぶ。)	September 21, 2009
Chi travels with the big black cat.
102	"Chi Renews Her Promise"; Transliteration: "Chī, moichido yakusoku suru" (Japanese: チー、もう一度約束する。)	September 22, 2009
Chi finds her way home and made a promise with the big black cat.
103	"Chi Runs"; Transliteration: "Chī, kakeru" (Japanese: チー、駆ける。)	September 23, 2009
The Yamadas go to the place where they first found and find Chi again.
104	"Chi Makes a Family"; Transliteration: "Chī, musubu" (Japanese: チー、結ぶ。)	September 24, 2009
Chi finally returns home and so everyone holds a party for her. Everyone there is her family.

=== Video game ===
A video game for the Nintendo DS, titled Chi's Sweet Home: Chi ga Ouchi ni Yatte Kita! (チーズスイートホーム チーがおうちにやってきた!; 'Chi's Sweet Home: Chi Has Come to Your House!), was developed by Interchannel and released on September 4, 2008.
