= An Older Guy's VR First Love =

Japanese manga series

- Cover of the volume

VRおじさんの初恋 (VR Ojisan no Hatsukoi)
- Genre: Romantic comedy
- Manga
- Written by: Violence Tomoko
- Published by: Ichijinsha
- English publisher: NA: Kodansha USA
- Imprint: Zero Sum Comics
- Magazine: Zero Sum Online
- Original run: August 7, 2020 – March 5, 2021
- Volumes: 1
- Television drama
- Directed by: Teruyuki Yoshida; Tomohiro Kuwano; Shunsuke Nakamura; Shinichiro Ishikawa
- Written by: Mash Morino
- Music by: Takashi Watanabe
- Studio: NHK
- Original network: NHK General TV
- Original run: April 1, 2024 – May 23, 2024
- Episodes: 32

An Older Guy's VR First Love (VRおじさんの初恋, VR Ojisan no Hatsukoi) is a Japanese manga series written and illustrated by Violence Tomoko. It was serialized on Ichijinsha's Zero Sum Online website from August 2020 to March 2021, with its chapters compiled into a single volume released in April 2021. A 32-episode live-action television drama adaptation aired from April to May 2024.

== Synopsis ==
Naoki Endō is a temp worker in his forties who plays a little girl character named Naoki in a virtual reality MMO game. When Naoki is told that the game's servers would be shutting down soon, he sees a mysterious, attractive woman named Honami and falls in love with her.

== Characters ==
Naoki Endō (遠藤直樹, Endō Naoki) / Naoki (ナオキ)
Portrayed by: Tooru Nomaguchi, Anna Kurasawa (Naoki)
Honami (ホナミ)
Portrayed by: Hiroe Igeta

== Media ==
=== Manga ===
Written and illustrated by Violence Tomoko, An Older Guy's VR First Love was serialized on Ichijinsha's Zero Sum Online website from August 7, 2020, to March 5, 2021. The series' chapters were compiled into a single wideban volume released on February 25, 2021.

During their panel at Anime NYC 2021, Kodansha USA announced that they had licensed the series for English publication would release the volume in November 2022.

| No. | Original release date | Original ISBN | North American release date | North American ISBN |
|---|---|---|---|---|
| 1 | February 25, 2021 | 978-4-7580-3592-7 | November 15, 2022 | 978-1-6472-9166-2 |
1. "First Encounter"; 2. "Go to the Beach"; 3. "Go Shopping"; 4. "Take a Trip"; 5. "The Edge of the World"; 6. "First Love I"; 7. "Boy and Girl"; 8. "Grandfather's House"; 9. "Relationship"; 10. "First Love II"; 11. "Awkwardness"; 12. "Promise"; 13. "World's End"; 14. "Epilogue: Sunset"

=== Drama ===
A live-action television drama adaptation was announced on January 10, 2024. The drama aired on NHK General TV from April 1 to May 23, 2024, for 32 15-minute long episodes.

== Reception ==
The series was nominated for the seventh Next Manga Awards in 2021 in the web category.
