= The Crimson Labyrinth =

1999 novel by Yusuke Kishi

- First edition
- Author: Yusuke Kishi
- Translator: Camellia Nieh
- Language: Japanese
- Genre: Novel
- Publisher: 角川書店; Vertical Inc (US)
- Publication date: 1999
- Publication place: Japan
- English publication date: October 2006
- Media type: Print (Hardback & Paperback)
- Pages: 288 pp
- ISBN: 1-932234-11-X
- OCLC: 85238337
- LC Class: PL855.I615 K8713 2006

The Crimson Labyrinth (クリムゾンの迷宮, Kurimuzon no Meikyū) is a novel by Japanese author Yusuke Kishi published in 1999.

== Plot summary ==
The main protagonist, Fujiki awakens to find himself in a strange desert landscape suffering from amnesia. His only clue is a small generic hand held game console "Pocket Game Kids," which informs him that he is now the unwilling participant in a game called "The Mars Labyrinth" and must head for the "1st checkpoint." While attempting to recall the foggy circumstances surrounding his arrival in the mysterious landscape he comes upon a woman named Ai. Since her machine is broken they decide to cooperate in order to reach the first checkpoint.

Upon their arrival, they meet seven additional players who also possess the game machines. The game's instructions are divided among all the players to ensure initial cooperation. The nine players discover that there are seven total checkpoints. The second checkpoint is divided into four possible choices: North for information, East for survival items, South for food, and West for self-defense items. The players divide up and agree to reconvene in order to divide up the items. Ai suggests to Fujiki that they choose "North." Upon reaching the checkpoint they are given additional game software which includes survival tips and explains that the game is set in the Bungle Bungles of Australia.

Once the players reunite it becomes apparent that they have all chosen to act selfishly and hold out on each other so Fujiki decides not to share all of their new found information. The following day everyone parts company but Fujiki and Ai decide to remain as a team and focus on honing their survival skills.

It eventually becomes apparent that the initial directions chosen by the players determines their roles in the game.

Fujiki eventually discovers that the entire game is constructed in the manner of a gamebook and that the nefarious purpose of their captors is to pit the players into a bloody contest against each other in order to create an elaborate snuff film from which only one is permitted to emerge alive.

== Characters ==
Yoshihiko Fujiki (藤木芳彦)

The main protagonist is a disillusioned salaryman. He awakes inside the labyrinth suffering from amnesia.

Ai Otomo (大友藍)

Ai is an erotic manga artist who befriends Fujiki early in the story.

Eisuke Noroto (野呂田栄介)

An older gentleman who seems to favor cooperation among the players.

Fumiko Abe (安部芙美子)

An irritable personality and the only other female among the players besides Ai.

Shigeta Funaoka (船岡茂)

For all his tough talk, he pairs up with Seno acting as his lackey.

Takamichi Kato (加藤高道)

A former school teacher.

Masaki Naramoto (楢本真樹)

A temp worker. He partners with Tsurumi.

Junichi Seno (妹尾純一)

The largest and strongest member of the group. He teams up with Funaoka, utilizing him as a sidekick.

Katsuya Tsurumi (鶴見克也)

Naramoto's partner.
