= From the New World (novel) =

Japanese novel and its adaptations

- Cover of the 2009 reprint

新世界より (Shin Sekai Yori)
- Genre: Dark fantasy; Dystopian; Thriller
- Novel
- Written by: Yusuke Kishi
- Published by: Kodansha
- Imprint: Kodansha Novels; Kodansha Bunko
- Published: January 23, 2008
- Manga
- Written by: Yusuke Kishi
- Illustrated by: Tōru Oikawa
- Published by: Kodansha
- English publisher: NA: Vertical Inc
- Imprint: Shōnen Magazine Comics
- Magazine: Bessatsu Shōnen Magazine
- Original run: May 9, 2012 – June 9, 2014
- Volumes: 7
- Anime television series
- Directed by: Masashi Ishihama
- Produced by: Tomonori Ochikoshi; Osamu Hosokawa; Tetsuya Kinoshita; Atsushi Kaji; Junpei Kawakami
- Written by: Masashi Sogo
- Music by: Shigeo Komori
- Studio: A-1 Pictures
- Licensed by: AUS: Hanabee; NA: Sentai Filmworks (expired); UK: MVM Films
- Original network: CS TV Asahi Channel, TV Asahi, ABC
- English network: Anime Network
- Original run: October 3, 2012 – March 27, 2013
- Episodes: 25
- icon

From the New World (Japanese: 新世界より, Hepburn: Shin Sekai Yori) is a Japanese novel by Yusuke Kishi. It was originally published in January 2008 by Kodansha. It follows Saki, a young girl who lives quietly in a beautiful and calm village and has just acquired her psychic powers at the age of twelve. She then goes to the academy to learn how to master it with other young people her age, including her friends Maria, Shun, Satoru, and Mamoru. But during an outing, the five of them will learn things they never should have known.

The story received a manga adaptation in Kodansha's manga magazine Bessatsu Shōnen Magazine, which was serialized between May 2012 and June 2014, and an anime television series adaptation by A-1 Pictures, which aired in Japan between October 2012 and March 2013. In North America, the manga has been licensed by Vertical (itself an imprint of Kodansha USA), and the anime is licensed by Sentai Filmworks.

In 2008, From the New World won the Grand Prize of the 29th Nihon SF Taisho Award.

== Synopsis ==
=== Setting ===
In the year 2011, 0.3 percent of the population developed psychic abilities called "Canto." Soon after these powers manifested themselves, many began using Canto for violence and crime, and the conscious and unconscious use of these powers altered the wildlife and environment. This led to a breakdown of modern society and a world war which devastated the human population and caused the fall of modern society. This was followed by oppressive and feudalistic regimes, but these too dissolved in chaos due to the violence of the psychic humans. Eventually, the psychic endowed humans established a stable society by controlling their powers using genetic modification and social conditioning. They made themselves incapable of violence against other humans by implementing Attack Inhibition and creating Death Feedback (Death of Shame in the anime) which would be activated if a psychic human kills another, causing the murderer's organs to shut down and the killer to die almost instantly. The villages also use genetically engineered creatures for various purposes. The mole-like Queerats (Note: "Queerats" are sometimes also referred to as "Monster Rats".) resemble humanity, are able to speak human language, and live in a complex eusocial society ruled by queens. The feline Impure Cats are used to kill children at risk of developing one of the two dangerous disorders: the Karmic Demons (業魔, Gōma), who are unable to control their powers, and the Fiends (悪鬼, Akki) (Ogres in the anime), who can suppress the Attack Inhibition and Death Feedback and use their special powers against humans.

=== Plot ===
One thousand years after the fall of modern society, Saki Watanabe is born in the tranquil agrarian settlement of Kamisu 66, a society where all humans wield potent psychic abilities. Initially feared by her parents to be a latent, she awakens her powers at age twelve and enrolls in Sage Academy alongside her peers—Satoru Asahina, Maria Akizuki, Mamoru Itou, Shun Aonuma, and Reiko Amano. Unbeknownst to them, the village authorities closely monitor students, eliminating those deemed unstable or dangerous. Erased from collective memory, these disappearances leave no trace; Saki and her friends remain unaware of Reiko's fate.

During an unsupervised excursion, the group encounters a False Minoshiro, a relic from the past that reveals the dark origins of their civilization and the true nature of their powers. Before they can learn more, the monk Rijin intervenes, destroying the machine and suppressing their abilities as punishment for consorting with forbidden knowledge. While returning to face judgment, Rijin is slain by rogue Queerats, and Saki and Satoru are captured. They escape with the aid of Squealer, a member of the Robber Fly colony, who later assists them in defeating their pursuers alongside General Kiroumaru of the allied Giant Hornet colony. Reunited with their friends, Saki restores their powers using hypnotic techniques employed by the village and returns home, believing their transgressions remain hidden.

Years later, Shun isolates himself before vanishing entirely. Saki discovers him in seclusion, learning he has succumbed to becoming a Karmic Demon. Before taking his own life, he reveals the adults' awareness of their past misdeeds. Though memories of Shun fade, Saki and her friends sense his absence. Meanwhile, Mamoru and Maria flee when the village targets Mamoru for elimination, aided by Squealer—now called Yakomaru—who stages their deaths. Saki later dreams of a faceless child warning her against searching for them.

As an adult, Saki works in the Department of Mutant Management, overseeing the Queerats. Yakomaru rises to power, conquering rival colonies before launching an assault on Kamisu 66 with a supposed Fiend—later revealed to be the child of Mamoru and Maria, raised by Yakomaru to bypass the psychological restraints that prevent psychics from harming humans. Pursued and outmatched, Saki and Satoru seek the Psychobuster, an ancient weapon, but ultimately spare the child upon realizing it is no true Fiend. Kiroumaru sacrifices himself by provoking the child's Death Feedback, ending the rebellion.

Yakomaru is captured and subjected to unending torment, though his defiance and claim that Queerats are human unsettle Saki. She later learns the Queerats were once ordinary humans genetically altered to prevent triggering psychic inhibitions. Unable to bear his suffering, she secretly ends his life.

A decade later, Saki and Satoru, now married and expecting a child, look toward the future with cautious hope, believing the world may yet improve for the next generation.

== Characters ==
=== Main characters ===
Saki Watanabe (渡辺 早季, Watanabe Saki)
Voiced by: Risa Taneda (12, 14 and 26 years old), Aya Endo (narrator, 36 years old) (Japanese); Emily Neves (English)
Saki Watanabe grows up in Kamisu 66, a society where all humans possess psychic abilities. Initially struggling with her powers, she later uncovers disturbing truths about her world. After surviving political purges and a Queerat rebellion, she rises to lead the Ethics Committee. As an adult, she records her experiences while expecting a child with Satoru Asahina, hoping to create a better future.
Satoru Asahina (朝比奈 覚, Asahina Satoru)
Voiced by: Kanako Tōjō (12 years old), Yūki Kaji (14, 26 and 36 years old) (Japanese); Greg Ayres (English)
Satoru Asahina is an energetic and clever boy skilled in telekinesis, often playfully arguing with Saki Watanabe. In his youth, he briefly dates Shun Aonuma before pursuing other relationships. As an adult, he becomes Saki's closest companion and eventual husband. His ability to generate reflective surfaces proves strategically vital during conflicts. He later uncovers the unsettling origins of the Queerat species, a revelation that deeply affects him.
Shun Aonuma (青沼 瞬, Aonuma Shun)
Voiced by: Mai Tōdō (12 years old), Ayumu Murase (14 years old) (Japanese); Clint Bickham (English)
Shun Aonuma is the most intellectually gifted and emotionally composed member of his peer group, possessing exceptional telekinetic abilities. Initially in a relationship with Satoru Asahina, he later distances himself as his powers grow unstable, ultimately transforming into a Karmic Demon. Though harboring long-standing feelings for Saki Watanabe, he avoids her to prevent endangering others. After a final conversation with Saki, he takes his own life when his powers spiral out of control. A residual psychic impression of Shun later surfaces in Saki's mind, providing critical guidance during pivotal moments.
Maria Akizuki (秋月 真理亜, Akizuki Maria)
Voiced by: Kana Hanazawa (Japanese); Monica Rial (English)
Maria Akizuki, distinguished by her long red hair, is the most admired student in her class. She later develops a romantic relationship with Saki Watanabe before forming a duty partnership with Mamoru Itou. Exceptionally skilled in matter manipulation, she eventually leaves the settlement with Mamoru when he flees persecution. Their fate is revealed when Saki discovers Maria was killed by the Robber Fly colony after giving birth to their child, who is later weaponized against human society.
Mamoru Itō (伊東 守, Itō Mamoru)
Voiced by: Haruka Kudō (12 years old), Motoki Takagi (14 years old) (Japanese); Blake Shepard (English)
Mamoru Itō, the least assertive and least skilled member of the group, develops romantic feelings for Maria Akizuki and becomes her duty partner. When targeted for elimination by the Board of Education, he flees into the wilderness, with Maria joining him in exile. Tomiko Asahina later confirms that the Robber Fly colony executed Mamoru. His child with Maria is taken by Squealer and groomed to lead the Queerat rebellion as their prophesied "Messiah".

=== Humans ===
Tomiko Asahina (朝比奈 富子, Asahina Tomiko)
Voiced by: Yoshiko Sakakibara (Japanese); Allison Sumrall (English)
Satoru's grandmother and also the head of the Ethics Committee. She intends for Saki to succeed her position as she possesses strong mental stability as well as the qualities of a leader. For this reason, she had asked the Board of Education not to dispose of Saki and her friends despite their transgressions. She also revealed that they were responsible for erasing their negative memories of the past to protect the minds of the townsfolk. With the ability to regenerate the telomeres in her cells, Tomiko has managed to extend her life, having lived for more than 250 years. She also had a close encounter with a Fiend in the past.
Shisei Kaburagi (鏑木 肆星, Kaburagi Shisei)
Voiced by: Takanori Hoshino (Japanese); David Matranga (English)
The adviser of the Security Council and also the strongest telekineticist in the village's history. He wears a hooded mask and has double irises in each eye, capable of detecting and dispelling attacks from all directions. He also displays calmness and confidence in retaliation against the Queerats' attack on the village but is still powerless against the Fiend due to Death Feedback.
Hiromi Torigai (鳥飼 宏美, Torigai Hiromi)
Voiced by: Yuri Amano (Japanese); Luci Christian (English)
Chairman of the Board of Education. She is the most anxious and cautious among the council representatives. She dies in the Queerats attack during the Summer Festival.
Masayo Komatsuzaki (小松崎 昌代, Komatsuzaki Masayo)
Voiced by: Kaori Yamagata (Japanese); Nancy Novotny (English)
Vice-chairman of the Board of Education.
Koufuu Hino (日野 光風, Hino Kōfū)
Voiced by: Kishō Taniyama (Japanese); Rob Mungle (English)
The representative of the Occupations Council. He was killed by a sneak attack in the Queerats attack during the Summer Festival.
Mizuho Watanabe (渡辺 瑞穂, Watanabe Mizuho)
Voiced by: Miki Itō (Japanese); Carli Mosier (English)
Saki's mother and also the head of the library. She entrusted Saki with the mission to search for the last weapon of mass destruction "Psychobuster" to eliminate the Fiend.
Takashi Sugiura (杉浦 敬, Sugiura Takashi)
Voiced by: Hiroki Touchi (Japanese); David Wald (English)
Saki's father.
Inui (乾)
Voiced by: Kōsuke Toriumi (Japanese); Andrew Love (English)
A Wildlife Protection officer. He was tasked to annihilate the Robber Fly colony and its allies but his mission failed. He was saved by Kiroumaru and he later accompanied Saki's group to Tokyo for her mission.
Mushin (無瞋)
Voiced by: Tamio Ōki (Japanese); Carl Masterson (English)
An old, heavily bearded head priest of the Temple of Purification. He conducts the ritual for children entering adulthood.
Rijin (離塵)
Voiced by: Tomokazu Sugita (Japanese); Leraldo Anzaldua (English)
A high priest of the Temple of Purification who seals away the children's telekinesis for breaking the rules and escorts them to be judged. He is killed by a Balloon Dog (風船犬, Fūsen Inu).
Reiko Amano (天野 麗子, Amano Reiko)
Voiced by: Yui Horie (Japanese); Brittney Karbowski (English)
Reiko is the sixth member of Saki's group at the beginning of the story. Due to her weak performance in class, she was killed by an Impure Cat.

=== Queerats ===
The Queerats (バケネズミ, Bakenezumi) are humanoid mole rat mutants organized in colonies that outwardly serve humans as divine beings. Their rebellion under Squealer exposes their suppressed resentment toward human oppression. Saki Watanabe later discovers they originated from non-psychic humans genetically altered with mole rat DNA, created to bypass the psychological restraints (Attack Inhibition and Death Feedback) that prevent psychics from harming ordinary humans.

Squealer (スクィーラ, Sukwīra) / Yakomaru (野狐丸, Yakomaru)
Voiced by: Daisuke Namikawa (Japanese); John Kaiser (English)
Squealer, initially a minor member of the Robber Fly colony, rises to become its supreme commander under the name Yakomaru. His Machiavellian leadership transforms the once-weak colony into a formidable force rivaling the Giant Hornets. While feigning loyalty to humans, he secretly uncovers his species' origins and plots their extermination. His scheme involves murdering the exiled Mamoru and Maria to acquire their psychic child, whom he grooms as the Queerats' messiah. After his rebellion fails, authorities condemn him to perpetual torment in "Infinite Hell." Upon discovering the Queerats' tragic history, Saki Watanabe discreetly ends his suffering.
Kiroumaru (奇狼丸, Kirōmaru)
Voiced by: Hiroaki Hirata (Japanese); David Wald (English)
Kiroumaru, commander of the Giant Hornet colony, first demonstrates loyalty by sparing Saki Watanabe and Satoru Asahina against orders. After his colony falls to the Robber Fly forces, he guides Saki's group to Tokyo's ruins to retrieve the Psychobuster weapon. When this fails, he confesses his repressed resentment toward human oppression before sacrificing himself to stop the Queerat Messiah. His final request—mercy for his surviving colony members—is honored by Saki.
Squnk (スクォンク, Sukwonku)
Voiced by: Kanehira Yamamoto (Japanese); John Swasey (English)
A member of the Goat Moth colony. Saki saved him from drowning when he fell into a river. Two years later, he repaid the favor by saving Mamoru after he fell off a cliff. He gives Saki a letter from Maria.

== Production ==
The idea of the story had been submitted earlier as a novella in 1980s, and was selected by Hayakawa SF Contest. Yusuke Kishi's translator noted that in this sense Kishi debuted as a science fiction writer even before his career in writing horror and mystery.

In an interview Kishi mentioned that he got the idea from reading King Solomon's Ring by Konrad Lorenz, in which the zoologist compared aggression of some herd animals with that of humans. Lorenz suggested that the animals have evolved to inhibit aggression to avoid mutual loss, while humans only acquired bigger destructive power recently and have no such instinctive inhibition. Kishi also said that some names of the strange animals were a tribute to the science fiction novel Long Afternoon of Earth by Brian Aldiss.

== Media ==
=== Novel ===
The novel From the New World was written by the Japanese author Yusuke Kishi and published by Kodansha. It is titled after Antonín Dvořák's Symphony No. 9 "From the New World", whose Movement II appears in the story several times. Its original publication was on January 23, 2008, in two volumes. On August 7, 2009, it was re-released as a single volume under the Kodansha Novels imprint; and again on January 14, 2011, as three volumes under the Kodansha Bunko imprint.

=== Manga ===
A manga adaption by Tōru Oikawa was serialized in Kodansha's shōnen manga magazine Bessatsu Shōnen Magazine from May 9, 2012, to June 9, 2014. The series has been collected in seven tankōbon volumes under the Kodansha Comics imprint, released between October 9, 2012, and August 8, 2014.

In 2013 the series was licensed in English by Vertical Inc, who released the seven volumes between November 12, 2013, and January 20, 2015.

==== Volumes ====
No.	Original release date	Original ISBN	English release date	English ISBN
1	October 9, 2012	978-4-06-384745-1	November 12, 2013	978-1-939130-13-6
2	December 7, 2012	978-4-06-384778-9	January 21, 2014	978-1-939130-14-3
3	May 9, 2013	978-4-06-384840-3	March 4, 2014	978-1-939130-29-7
4	September 9, 2013	978-4-06-394924-7	May 13, 2014	978-1-939130-30-3
5	December 9, 2013	978-4-06-394957-5	July 29, 2014	978-1-939130-98-3
6	April 9, 2014	978-4-06-395019-9	September 9, 2014	978-1-941220-35-1
7	August 8, 2014	978-4-06-395142-4	January 20, 2015	978-1-941220-53-5

=== Anime ===
The novel was adapted into an anime television series by A-1 Pictures which aired on TV Asahi from October 2012 to March 2013. The anime does not have an opening theme but has two ending themes. "Wareta Ringo" (割れたリンゴ; lit. Sliced Apple) by Risa Taneda was used for episode 1 through 16, which was replaced by "Yuki ni Saku Hana" (雪に咲く花; lit. The Flower Blooming in Snow) by Kana Hanazawa starting in episode 17.

It has been licensed by Sentai Filmworks in North America. Sentai Filmworks later released the English dub version on DVD and Blu-Ray on April 15, 2014. Hanabee Entertainment licensed the series in Australia, and released it on Blu-ray and DVD on June 9, 2016.

==== Episodes ====
No.	Title	Original release date
1	"The Season of New Leaves"; Transliteration: "Wakaba no Kisetsu" (Japanese: 若葉の季節)	October 3, 2012
In the year 2011, humans begin to manifest psychokinetic powers, leaving a trail of death and destruction in their wake. 1,000 years later, Saki Watanabe finally has her own Cantus powers awakened, and after a ritual of passage, she leaves Harmony School and joins her friends whose powers emerged earlier at the Sage Academy. However, one of them, Reiko Amano, is revealed to have weaker control over her powers than her peers, and soon afterwards she mysteriously disappears.
2	"The Vanishing Children"; Transliteration: "Kieyuku Kora" (Japanese: 消えゆく子ら)	October 10, 2012
Saki and her friends in Group 1 take part in a game tournament where each group must control small clay dolls pushing a large ball with their Cantus power. Her team defeats several opponents until the final match when Manabu Katayama of the opposing team breaks the rules in a violation of the Code of Virtue, ending the match in a draw. Later that day, the children find a Queerat in trouble and Saki decides to save it, using her Cantus powers without permission. After the tournament, Manabu Katayama's name is removed from the list of students and he is never seen again.
3	"The False Minoshiro"; Transliteration: "Minoshiro Modoki" (Japanese: ミノシロモドキ)	October 17, 2012
The five members of Group 1 set out for summer camp and they start telling scary stories. Satoru talks about Balloon Dogs, creatures capable of causing themselves to explode although the other children doubt their existence, rationalizing that none would exist if they all blew up. The children recall the legend of a strange creature known as the "False Minoshiro" which brings death to all in its path. Venturing further than they should, they to locate a multicolored Minoshiro and Saki manages to capture it. Much to their surprise, it can communicate with them and it reveals that it is a repository of information.
4	"Bloody History"; Transliteration: "Chinurareta Rekishi" (Japanese: 血塗られた歴史)	October 24, 2012
Under the threat of being dismembered, Minoshiro grants the children temporary data access. It reveals the truth about the tragic history of the world since the advent of humanity's psychokinetic powers 1,000 years ago which the children have difficulty believing. Just as the False Minoshiro explains the origin of their society, a monk called Rijin kills the creature, calling it a "mountain demon". They see a vision of a woman holding a baby as it dies. Rijin seals their Cantus and takes them away to be judged for their actions. Due to killing the False Minoshiro, the monk experiences a phenomenon called the death feedback, which hinders his ability to think properly. On the way back, they are attacked by a group of Queerats, who are slain by the monk. From the pile of corpses a Balloon Dog emerges and leaps toward them.
5	"Pursuit on a Hot Night"; Transliteration: "Tōbō no Nettaiya" (Japanese: 逃亡の熱帯夜)	October 31, 2012
The Balloon Dog explodes, killing the monk and itself. Defenseless without their Cantus powers against the Queerats, the children flee, but Saki and her friend Satoru are captured by Queerats. After escaping confinement, the pair is rescued by Squealer, a Queerat from the Robber Fly colony who takes them before his queen and asks for their help against the invading rivals of the Ground (Feral) Spider colony of Queerats who originally captured them. Saki and Satoru do not reveal that their Cantus powers are sealed, and flee through the underground tunnels when the invasion begins.
6	"Escape"; Transliteration: "Tōhikō" (Japanese: 逃避行)	November 7, 2012
Saki and Satoru appear to be trapped in the tunnels with no chance to escape. Saki deduces that Rijin hypnotized the students into forgetting their mantras, which are necessary to invoke their Cantus. Because Saki had tricked Satoru to reveal his mantra in their childhood, she uses the induction ceremony to recite his mantra and recover his Cantus. Instead of fleeing, Satoru decides to fight the Ground Spider colony and has some success. Aided by Squealer and the surviving Robber Fly warriors, the group survives several enemy ambushes. Satoru begins to show signs of fatigue from overusing his abilities, but despite Saki's protests, he continues until they encounter a massive army of Queerats.
7	"Summer Darkness"; Transliteration: "Natsuyami" (Japanese: 夏闇)	November 14, 2012
The Giant Hornet Queerat colony led by Kiroumaru arrives and annihilates the Ground Spiders. On the pretext of surrendering, the Ground Spiders' leader unleashes two Balloon Dogs, but Satoru uses his remaining energy to deflect the blast. Satoru suspects that Kiroumaru may intend to kill both him and Saki, and they flee through the forest, guided through a shortcut by Squealer. Upon arriving at the river, they are reunited with their friends. As they return to town, they encounter Kiroumaru, who surprisingly helps them by towing their canoes behind his ship. In parting, Kiroumaru asks that they keep his assistance a secret, suggesting he may have defied orders to kill or capture them. Saki restores Shun's telepathic powers and helps the others restore their own when they return home.
8	"Omen"; Transliteration: "Yochō" (Japanese: 予兆)	November 21, 2012
Two years pass, and the children enter adolescence and Saki finds her feelings for Shun unrequited. He starts dating Satoru while Saki starts dating Maria. Soon afterwards, Shun breaks up with Satoru and starts distancing himself from everyone else. Saki questions him about it and he reveals that the adults know about the events of two years ago at the summer camp. He warns her to be careful because it will soon be time for them to be punished for their past transgressions.
9	"The Rising Wind"; Transliteration: "Kaze Tachinu" (Japanese: 風立ちぬ)	November 28, 2012
Shun stops going to school, and his friends in Group 1 secretly start looking for him. Saki and Satoru set out for Shun's home village of Pinewood, only to find it isolated by the authorities and Shun's house destroyed. Later at night, Saki confronts her parents about what really happened to the village but they have been forbidden to tell her the truth. Soon after, Saki is visited by Maria, who reveals to her she and Mamoru learned that several Impure Cats (不浄猫, fujō neko), which are used to eliminate troublesome children are being maintained at the school, and two were freed to hunt down Shun. Saki flees to warn him and encounters one of the Impure Cats.
10	"More Than Darkness"; Transliteration: "Yami Yori Mo" (Japanese: 闇よりも)	December 5, 2012
Protected by a charm from Shun, Saki manages to defeat the Impure Cat before finding him. Shun explains that his entire village was destroyed because his powers went out of control. She also learns from him that the drastic alteration in the world's fauna and flora seen in the last 1,000 years was due to the residual Cantus which flows out of humans who are not in full control. The safehouse where he is being kept is bizarrely warped and his pet bulldog Subaru is mutated into a monstrous form by the leakage of his Cantus which causes him to become a Karmic Demon. A second Impure Cat arrives to kill Shun, and Subaru is killed protecting him. Shun kills the cat, but as he is killed by his own uncontrolled power, he reveals to Saki that he always loved her.
11	"Distant Thunder in Winter"; Transliteration: "Fuyu no Enrai" (Japanese: 冬の遠雷)	December 12, 2012
As part of their schooling, each student is paired with a partner of the opposite sex for further training. Saki's classmate Ryou is interested in partnering with her, but as Saki realizes that he is not who he appears to be, she turns him down and pairs up with Satoru instead. Saki and her friends realize that their memories have been altered so they accept Ryou as a childhood member of the group instead of Shun, whose identity they cannot remember. Saki finds a mirror in an old crate, which when polished, reveals the name of her older sister Yoshimi, whom the children deduce was eliminated because she had poor control over her powers. Mamoru begins to panic, so Saki, Satoru and Maria decide to keep investigating without him. Soon, they are called for an audience with the head of the Ethics Committee who happens to be Satoru's grandmother Tomiko, a fact that not even Satoru was aware of.
12	"The Weak Link"; Transliteration: "Yowai Kan" (Japanese: 弱い環)	December 19, 2012
Tomiko reveals to Saki the truth behind Fiends and Karmic Demons, including their reasons for the harsh means they developed to prevent them from appearing. Also, she was the one who intervened and had Saki and her friends spared by the Board of Education after the incident with the False Minoshiro. Tomiko tells Saki that she is considered to be the most suited one to be her successor. Some time later, Mamoru mysteriously runs away from home and Saki, Maria and Satoru take advantage of a break in classes to look for him.
13	"Reunion"; Transliteration: "Saikai" (Japanese: 再会)	December 26, 2012
Saki and the others follow Mamoru's tracks through snow covered mountains until they find him in a shelter. They meet Squonk, the Queerat who saved Mamoru and which Saki saved from drowning years earlier. Mamoru reveals to them that he left the village in fear because firstly, he suspected that he had been followed by an Impure Cat, and secondly, signs that the Board of Education intended to dispose of him.
14	"Snowflakes"; Transliteration: "Sekka" (Japanese: 雪華)	January 8, 2013
Saki and Satoru leave Maria behind with Mamoru in the care of the Queerats and return to the village. Saki is grilled by the Board of Education but is released after Tomiko again intervenes on her behalf. Tomiko reveals that the members of Group 1 were selected for special treatment since childhood. They have been spared most of the hypnotic conditioning and memory alteration that is routinely used to instill obedience and docility. Tomiko predicts that the Board will order the destruction of both Mamoru and Maria, but says she can delay this for three days. Saki and Satoru head off to try to bring the others back before this deadline, but are unable to find the shelter again.
15	"Afterimage"; Transliteration: "Zanzō" (Japanese: 残像)	January 16, 2013
While Saki and Satoru search for Maria and Mamoru, they find themselves in the Robber Fly colony where they are reunited with Squealer who has taken the name "Yakomaru". They learn from Yakomaru that the Robber Fly society has greatly advanced since their last meeting, and it is now part of a strong confederation of colonies. However, they are shocked to find that the queen has been restrained and lobotomized because she was a threat to their developing society, and is kept alive only to reproduce. Satoru suspects that the Robber Fly colony has captured a False Minoshiro and accessed its knowledge. Yakomaru takes the pair to meet Squonk at the nest of the Goat Moth Queerat colony to ask him about the whereabouts of their missing friends, but Yakomaru appears to have military intentions. A skirmish occurs between the two colonies until Satoru uses his power to stop them. Saki is finally reunited with Squonk who gives her a letter from Maria, saying that she had departed with Mamoru.
16	"To my beloved Saki"; Transliteration: "Aisuru Saki e" (Japanese: 愛する早季へ)	January 23, 2013
Saki reads Maria's heartfelt farewell letter, condemning the village philosophy of killing potentially antisocial children and asking her to return and tell the villagers that she and Mamoru are dead. However, they ignore Maria's request, and with only a day left, decide to continue their search for Maria and Mamoru . As hope dwindles, Saki begins to experience bizarre and troubling nightmares of a faceless boy who tells her not to aid in her friends' escape, and that Maria has to die.
17	"Footsteps of Destruction"; Transliteration: "Hametsu no Ashioto" (Japanese: 破滅の足音)	January 30, 2013
Several years later, Saki, now 26 years old, is working in the "Department of Exospecies Management". She is visited at work by Satoru, bringing news of an unprovoked attack among the Queerats, whose colonies are now divided into two large alliances. The leaders of the opposing alliances, Kiroumaru representing the Giant Hornets (Spider Wasps) and Yakomaru representing the Robber Flies (Goat Moths), are summoned to be questioned about the incident. Both leaders exchanging accusations, but no conclusion is reached and some time later the conflict between both parties escalates into a sanctioned war. In the first battle, Kiroumaru's Giant Hornet army defeats their opponents, which for some reason did not include members of the main enemy colony of Robber Flies led by Yakomaru. Some time later, Saki is visited by Satoru again who informs her that the Giant Hornets were annihilated.
18	"Scarlet Flower"; Transliteration: "Akai Hana" (Japanese: 紅い花)	February 6, 2013
An investigation is conducted regarding the unexpected demise of the Giant Hornets, but it finds no conclusive evidence. Shisei Kaburagi, the security council advisor, suspects that a human with telekinesis powers such as Maria and Mamoru are behind the attack, but Tomiko dismisses this stating that DNA testing confirmed that bones delivered by Yakomaru were those of Maria and Mamoru. The council decides unanimously to wipe out the Robber Fly colony, but on the night of the summer festival, an army of Queerats stage a surprise attack on the village. Satoru and Saki are caught in the commotion, but Kaburagi saves the village by using his great telekinetic powers to drive away the enemy. With many casualties and the village in state of emergency, Tomiko swears Yakomaru will suffer a slow and painful death for his treason.
19	"Darkness"; Transliteration: "Kurayami" (Japanese: 暗闇)	February 13, 2013
In the aftermath of the Queerats' sneak attack, Saki and Satoru join three others (Okano, Kuramochi and Satoru) to form a new group of five to visit the hospital and check on one of their injured friends. As they arrive, they find the hospital damaged. They clear the place of armed Queerats and rescue the few human survivors, but the party is attacked by an unknown individual who kills everyone in their path with an overwhelming power. Fearing that the enemy in question may be a Fiend, the other members of the party decide to sacrifice themselves to let Saki and Satoru to escape and warn the others. However, as their boat floats down the river, the duo realize that they are being followed by the enemy.
20	"Cold Sunlight"; Transliteration: "Tsumetai Hidamari" (Japanese: 冷たい日だまり)	February 20, 2013
Saki and Satoru create a diversion and manage to escape in their boat before the Fiend incinerates it. They continue on to the village in order to warn the townspeople, but come across a mutant fish which blows itself up in a suicide attack. Saki is blown away by the explosion and separated from Satoru. While in midair, she has a flashback of her parting with Shun, but still cannot remember his name or face. When she lands, she is attacked by a young boy, who mistakes her for a Queerat. Together they continue to the village, which is now in shambles with many dead or injured people and canals drained of water to prevent mutant fish attacks. Saki finds Tomiko injured at the Sage Academy, but Tomiko refuses to believe that a Fiend is on the loose. She tells Saki to find the Security Council and warn the others, and formally requests that Saki take charge of the Ethics Committee and tell everyone to flee. Saki reluctantly departs the hospital, leaving Tomiko behind.
21	"The Fire that Destroys the World"; Transliteration: "Gōka" (Japanese: 劫火)	February 27, 2013
Kaburagi declares war on the Queerats, promising to eliminate them from Japan. But the Fiend approaches, killing many humans and Saki is shocked by its resemblance to Maria. Though Kaburagi manages to evade the Fiend's first attack, the Fiend kills him. Saki, Satoru and Niimi escape through a tunnel and encounter a wounded Queerat who tells them that the Queerat race will now be the new rulers, and that their "Messiah", the Fiend, was sent from the heavens to save them. Niimis leave them to warn the others at the Town Hall and he sends Saki and Satoru to the Temple of Purity. They arrive and learn that Saki's parents left to release the remaining Impure Cats upon the Fiend. They also meet up with Inui, who tells them about his group's failed mission to dispose of the Robber Fly colony and his first encounter with the Fiend and death of his group. When he returned to the hospital he found all the human infants had been stolen. Saki realizes that Yakomaru killed Maria and Mamoru, took their child, and then raised it to become a Fiend. He plans to do the same with the stolen infants, creating an army of Fiends that will wipe the humans off the face of the Earth and bring rise to a Queerat empire.
22	"Tokyo"; Transliteration: "Tōkyō" (Japanese: 東京)	March 6, 2013
Inui tells Saki that it was Kiroumaru who rescued him after he collapsed, but he was subsequently taken prisoner. Saki receives a package and a letter from her mother which details the location in Tokyo of an ancient weapon called the "Psychobuster", devised by normal humans to kill psychics. Saki and Satoru visit the imprisoned Kiroumaru, who offers them his help in finding the weapon's location. The trio depart with Inui a submarine device to search for the Psychobuster and eventually reach the desert ruins of Tokyo. However, they are detected and soon after arriving in the dangerous wasteland, they learn that Yakomaru, along with his army and the Fiend have followed them there.
23	"The Face of the Boy"; Transliteration: "Shōnen no Kao" (Japanese: 少年の顔)	March 13, 2013
As Saki's group makes their way through the treacherous tunnels under Tokyo, they came across an underground river within the caves. They split into two groups: Satoru and Kiroumaru to drive away their pursuers while Saki and Inui go to retrieve the submarine so that can continue their mission through the river. On the way, Shun appears to Saki and suggests there is no fiend. While making their way to the Psychobuster, they are attacked by a giant ragworm and Inui sacrifices his life so that Saki can continue her mission. After retrieving the Psychobuster, a small pendant containing a liquid, Saki takes off towards the sun at daybreak. As she runs past the dilapidated scene of Tokyo, she is finally able to recall her last conversation with Shun as her lost memories are restored and she sees an image of Shun before her.
24	"Torchlight in the Darkness"; Transliteration: "Yami ni Moeshi Kagaribi wa" (Japanese: 闇に燃えし篝火は)	March 20, 2013
Kiroumaru finds Saki and leads her back to Satoru who is slightly injured. Kiroumaru then decides that they should counterattack so Satoru and Saki wait in a tunnel as Kiroumaru leaves to lure the Fiend. Saki believes the Fiend does not know that it is human, so she creates mirror which momentarily confuses the Fiend before it screams and attacks them. Satoru throws the Psychobuster at the Fiend, but Saki incinerates the Psychobuster before it can infect both the Fiend and Satoru. Kiroumaru reappears and quickly distracts the Fiend as they escape and hide in the tunnels. Yakomaru offers to negotiate with Saki's group but Kiroumaru realizes that his motive is to discover their position through their voices. While hiding, Saki reflects on Shun's statement that the child may not be a Fiend and she realizes that they may still have a way to defeat the Fiend.
25	"From the New World"; Transliteration: "Shin Sekai Yori" (Japanese: 新世界より)	March 27, 2013
Saki realizes that the Fiend is the human child of Maria and Mamoru who was conditioned to think that it was a Queerat and by Yakomaru. Thus, it would only suffer "death feedback" from killing Queerats and not from killing humans. Kiroumaru then disguises himself as a human and confronts the Fiend which kills him, but Kiroumaru then reveals his identity as a Queerrat and "death feedback" kills the Fiend. With the rebellion suppressed, Yakomaru renounces his title and addresses himself again as Squealer. He is tried and sentenced to "Eternal Hell", with his body suffering excruciating pain while being regenerated indefinitely. Satoru later reveals to Saki that he has discovered that Queerats were created by infusing mole rat DNA into ordinary humans to prevent them from being a threat to those humans with telekinesis. Saki then visits Squealer and grants him a merciful death. Ten years pass, and the now married Saki and Satoru expect their first child, both positive that by the time it grows up, the world will be a better place.

== Reception ==
Along with Den-noh Coil, From the New World received the Grand Prize of the 29th Nihon SF Taisho Award by the Science Fiction and Fantasy Writers of Japan (SFWJ) in 2008.

The Encyclopedia of Science Fiction described From the New World as an excellent anime, praising its storytelling as intelligent and complex and visuals as frequently impressive. It highlighted the series' gradual revelation that its seemingly peaceful, pastoral utopia is founded on oppression, violence and the systematic manipulation of human society through genetic engineering and memory editing. The encyclopedia particularly emphasized the sociological implications of the relationship between the telekinetic humans and the Monster Rats, whose apparent biological inferiority conceals a history of enslavement and deliberate dehumanization. It interpreted the Monster Rats' increasingly authoritarian and violent society as a consequence of humanity's inability to confront its own historical injustices, leading the oppressed to reproduce the destructive patterns of their oppressors.
