= Kanako Tōjō =

Japanese voice actress

- 東條 加那子
- Born: March 3, 1984 (age 42); Kagoshima Prefecture, Japan
- Occupation: Voice actress
- Years active: 2005–present
- Agent: Axl-One
- Height: 163 cm (5 ft 4 in)

Kanako Tōjō (東條 加那子, Tōjō Kanako; born March 3, 1984) is a Japanese voice actress from Kagoshima Prefecture, Japan. She voiced Karin in Naruto: Shippuden and Ivy Valentine in Soulcalibur.

== Filmography ==
=== Anime ===
Year	Series	Role	Notes	Source
2006	Kage Kara Mamoru!	Mother		
2007	Naruto: Shippuden	Karin, others		
2008	Blassreiter	Zebbu		
2008	Soul Eater	Kanshu		
2008	Cobra the Animation: The Psychogun	Navigator		
2008	Kannagi: Crazy Shrine Maidens	Sakushaman	Ep. 9	
2008–09	Tales of the Abyss	Josette Cecil		
2009	Cobra the Animation: Time Drive	Layla		
2010	Demon King Daimao	Fujiko's mother		
2010	The Tatami Galaxy	Young Lady MC	Ep. 7	
2011	Manyū Hiken-chō	Sengumi Manyu		
2011	Mobile Suit Gundam AGE	Nadia		
2012	Lupin the Third: The Woman Called Fujiko Mine	Aiyan		
2012	From the New World	Satoru Asahina	Part I	
2013	DD Fist of the North Star	Housewife, mother		
2014	Always! Super Radical Gag Family	Junko Ōsawagi		
2014	Gundam Build Fighters Try	Lady Kawaguchi		
	Shima Shima Tora no Shimajirō	Gu-Gu Zemi		
	Ojarumaru	Hachie		

=== Video games ===
Year	Series	Role	Notes	Source
2002	Soul Nomad & the World Eaters	Kurutegu		
2007	Professor Layton and the Curious Village			
2007–09	Soulcalibur series	Ivy Valentine	Legends, IV, Broken Destiny	
2008	Metal Gear Solid 4: Guns of the Patriots	Enemy Soldiers		
2008	Sigma Harmonics	Juri Ando		
2008	Professor Layton and the Unwound Future			
2009	Final Fantasy Crystal Chronicles: Echoes of Time	Torato		
2009	Kidō Senshi Gundam: Senjō no Kizuna	Pilot		
2009	Dead Space: Extraction	Lexine Murdoch		
2010	Alan Wake	Rose Marigold		
2010	Halo: Reach	Antidote		
2010	Ni no Kuni	Lucci		
2012	Time Travelers	Apita Petronius		
2012	Resident Evil 6	Deborah Harper		
2013	Killer Is Dead	Natalia		
2014	Oreshika: Tainted Bloodlines	Mitsuchichihime		
2015	Until Dawn	Ashley	dub voice for Galadriel Stineman	

=== Overseas dubbing ===
List of voice performances in overseas television programs
Series	Role	Notes	Source
24	Willy		
90210	Sasha	Season 2	
Bones	Tanaka Hull	Season 4	
Chuggington	Hodge		
Criminal Minds	Amanda	Season 4	
Damages	Alex		
Dollhouse	Echo	dub voice for Eliza Dushku	
Drop Dead Diva	Elisa, Shayne	Season 3, dub voice for Brandy Norwood	
Eureka	Joe Lupo	dub voice for Erica Cerra	
The Flash	Caitlin Snow / Killer Frost	dub voice for Danielle Panabaker	
The Following	Max Hardy	dub voice for Jessica Stroup	
Ghost Whisperer	Andrea Morino		
Gilmore Girls	Paris Geller		
Glee	Roz		
Gossip Girl	Bree Buckley	Season 3, dub voice for JoAnna Garcia Swisher	
Grey's Anatomy	Rebecca Pope		
Hawthorne	Candy		
Lost	Naomi Doritto		
Medium	Zoe	Season 5	
Prison Break	Lisa Tabak		
Once Upon a Time	Belle French	dub voice for Emilie de Ravin	
Royal Pains	Anna		
The Secret Circle	Faye	dub voice for Phoebe Tonkin	
Supernatural	Robin	Season 6, dub voice for Erica Cerra	
Ugly Betty	Rene Slater	Season 2	
Veronica Mars	Mac		

List of voice performances in overseas films
Series	Role	Notes	Source
Suicide Squad	Harley Quinn	dub voice for Margot Robbie	
Birds of Prey	Harleen Quinzel / Harley Quinn	dub voice for Margot Robbie	
The Suicide Squad	Harley Quinn	dub voice for Margot Robbie	
Babylon	Nellie LaRoy	dub voice for Margot Robbie	
2 Guns	Deb Rees	dub voice for Paula Patton	
2012	Alexander		
Alice Through the Looking Glass	Alexandra Ascot	dub voice for Joanna Bobin	
American Hustle	Rosalyn Rosenfeld	dub voice for Jennifer Lawrence	
August	Melanie Hanson	dub voice for Robin Tunney	
The Avengers	Waitress Beth	dub voice for Ashley Johnson	
Cadillac Records	Etta James	dub voice for Beyoncé	
Casino Royale	Veronica		
Catacombs	Carolyn	dub voice for Pink	
Crank: High Voltage	Ria	dub voice for Bai Ling	
Creed	Bianca	dub voice for Tessa Thompson	
Curse of Chucky	Jill	dub voice for Maitland McConnell	
The Dark Knight	Ramirez	dub voice for Monique Gabriela Curnen	
Dear Eleanor	Aunt Daisy	dub voice for Jessica Alba	
The Dictator	Zoey Aladeen	dub voice for Anna Faris	
Dinoshark	Carol		
Edge of Tomorrow	Sergeant Rita Rose Vrataski	dub voice for Emily Blunt	
Elizabethtown	Cindy		
Fast & Furious	Gisele	dub voice for Gal Gadot	
Fast Five	Gisele	dub voice for Gal Gadot	
F9	Gisele	dub voice for Gal Gadot	
The Fourth Kind	Jessica		
The Girl with the Dragon Tattoo	Elizabeth Sanders	dub voice for Rooney Mara	
The Great Gatsby	Myrtle Wilson	dub voice for Isla Fisher	
Guardians of the Galaxy	Bereet	dub voice for Melia Kreiling	
Hannah Montana: The Movie	Taylor Swift		
Harry Potter and the Half-Blood Prince	Pansy Parkinson		
Harry Potter and the Deathly Hallows – Part 2	Pansy Parkinson	dub voice for Scarlett Byrne	
Hatching Pete	Angela		
Haven	Andrea	dub voice for Zoe Saldaña	
Haywire	Mallory Kane	dub voice for Gina Carano	
Hick	Glenda	dub voice for Blake Lively	
The Hunger Games: Mockingjay – Part 1	Cressida	dub voice for Natalie Dormer	
The Hunger Games: Mockingjay – Part 2	Cressida	dub voice for Natalie Dormer	
I Love You, Beth Cooper	Cammie		
The Internship	Dana Simms	dub voice for Rose Byrne	
Iron Man 3	Maya Hansen	dub voice for Rebecca Hall	
John Carter	Sola	dub voice for Samantha Morton	
John Wick	Ms. Perkins	dub voice for Adrianne Palicki	
Jupiter Ascending	Jupiter Jones	dub voice for Mila Kunis	
The Lazarus Project	Lisa	dub voice for Piper Perabo	
Madagascar 2	Hippo		
Men in Black 3	Lily	dub voice for Nicole Scherzinger	
Mission: Impossible III	Annie		
Mission: Impossible – Ghost Protocol	Jane Carter	dub voice for Paula Patton	
The Mummy: Tomb of the Dragon Emperor	Choi		
My Blueberry Nights	Elizabeth	dub voice for Norah Jones	
Ouija	Isabelle	dub voice for Bianca Santos	
The Paperboy	Anita Chester	dub voice for Macy Gray	
Rango	Beans	Animation	
Ride Along	Angela Payton	dub voice for Tika Sumpter	
Rise of the Planet of the Apes	Dr. Caroline Aranha	dub voice for Freida Pinto	
Rogue Assassin	Maria	dub voice for Nadine Velazquez	
Rush	Suzy Miller	dub voice for Olivia Wilde	
School for Scoundrels	Becky	dub voice for Sarah Silverman	
Sherlock Holmes: A Game of Shadows	Madame Simza Heron	dub voice for Noomi Rapace	
Sicario	Kate Macer	dub voice for Emily Blunt	
The Social Network	Christie	dub voice for Brenda Song	
Son of a Gun	Tasha	dub voice for Alicia Vikander	
Star Trek	Uhura	dub voice for Zoe Saldaña	
Star Trek Beyond	Uhura	dub voice for Zoe Saldaña	
Sunshine Cleaning	Norah	dub voice for Emily Blunt	
Super 8	Jen		
Teenage Mutant Ninja Turtles: Out of the Shadows	April O'Neil	dub voice for Megan Fox	
Thor	Nurse		
A Thousand Words	Caroline McCall	dub voice for Kerry Washington	
The Three Musketeers	Blonde	dub voice for Helen George	
Tomogui	Anya		
Trance	Elizabeth	dub voice for Rosario Dawson	
Transformers	Mikaela Banes	dub voice for Megan Fox	
Transformers: Revenge of the Fallen	Mikaela Banes	dub voice for Megan Fox	
Transporter 3	Valentina	dub voice for Natalya Rudakova	
The Unborn	Romy Marshall	dub voice for Meagan Good	
Unfriended	Blaire Lily	dub voice for Shelley Hennig	
Valentine's Day	Morley	dub voice for Jessica Alba	
Vanishing on 7th Street	Rosemary	dub voice for Thandie Newton	
Vantage Point	Angie	dub voice for Zoe Saldaña	
We Own the Night	Amanda	dub voice for Eva Mendes	
What's Your Number?	Daisy Anne Darling	dub voice for Ari Graynor	
Wild Things: Foursome	Brandy	dub voice for Jillian Murray	
X-Men: Apocalypse	Psylocke	dub voice for Olivia Munn	
Zombie Strippers!	Lilith		
