= Kenjiro Haitani =

Japanese writer (1934–2006)

Kenjiro Haitani (灰谷 健次郎, Haitani Kenjirō; October 31, 1934 – November 23, 2006) was a Japanese author of children's literature.

He was the author of Usagi no me ("A Rabbit's Eyes") and Taiyo no Ko ("Children of the Sun"), both best-sellers.

Haitani died of esophageal cancer on 23 November 2006, aged 72. According to his wishes, no funeral services were held.
