= Ken Liu bibliography =

Bibliography

Bibliography of author Ken Liu.

== Bibliography ==
=== The Dandelion Dynasty ===
1. —— (2015). The Grace of Kings. S&S/Saga Press. ISBN 9781481424271.
2. —— (2016). The Wall of Storms. S&S/Saga Press. ISBN 9781481424301.
3. —— (2021). The Veiled Throne. S&S/Saga Press. ISBN 9781481424332.
4. —— (2022). Speaking Bones. S&S/Saga Press. ISBN 9781982148973.

=== A Julia Z Novel ===
1. —— (2025). All That We See or Seem. S&S/Saga Press. ISBN 9781668083192.

=== Franchise novels ===
- The Legends of Luke Skywalker. Disney LucasFilm Press. 2017. ISBN 9781484780770.

=== Short fiction collections ===
- —— (2016). The Paper Menagerie and Other Stories. S&S/Saga Press. ISBN 9781481424363.
- —— (2020). The Hidden Girl and Other Stories. S&S/Saga Press. ISBN 9781982134037.
- —— (2026). The Passing of the Dragon and Other Stories. S&S/Saga Press. ISBN 9781668208342.

=== Anthologies (as editor) ===
- Invisible Planets, Tor Books, November 2016
- Broken Stars, Tor Books, February 2019

=== Anthology appearances ===
- The Best Science Fiction and Fantasy of the Year, Volume Seven. Night Shade Books. 2013. ISBN 9781597804592.
- The Best Science Fiction of the Year: Volume 1. Night Shade Books. 2016. ISBN 9781597808545.
- The Best Science Fiction and Fantasy of the Year: Volume Eleven. Solaris Books. 2017. ISBN 9781781085622.
- The Best Science Fiction of the Year: Volume 2. Night Shade Books. 2017. ISBN 9781597808965.
- The Year’s Best Science Fiction: Thirty-Fourth Annual Collection. St. Martin’s Griffin. 2017. ISBN 9781250119230.
- The Best American Science Fiction and Fantasy 2020. Mariner Books. 2020. ISBN 9781328613103.
- The Best American Science Fiction and Fantasy 2021. Mariner Books. 2021. ISBN 9780358469964.
- The Big Book of Cyberpunk. Vintage Books. 2023. ISBN 978-0593467237.

=== Short stories ===
Year	Title	First published	Collected	Notes
2002	Carthaginian Rose	Empire of Dreams and Miracles: The Phobos Science Fiction Anthology Volume 1, edited by Orson Scott Card and Keith Olexa, 2002.		
2003	Gossamer	Writers of the Future, Vol. 19, 2003; reprinted in Semaphore Magazine, March 1, 2011.		
2004	The Algorithms for Love	(online), Strange Horizons, July 2004; reprinted in Issue #4 of International Speculative Fiction, edited by Roberto Mendes, July 2012.		
2004	State Change	Polyphony 4, edited by Deborah Layne and Jay Lake, September 2004; reprinted by Lightspeed, August 2014.	The Paper Menagerie and Other Stories	
2007	Beneath the Language	(online), On the Premises, July 2007 (Issue 2)		
2009	Single-Bit Error	Thoughtcrime Experiments, edited by Sumana Harihareswara and Leonard Richardson, 2009; International Speculative Fiction, edited by Roberto Mendes, December 2013;		
2010	Beidou	The Dragon and the Stars, edited by Derwin Mak and Eric Choi, May 2010.		
2010	The Phoenix	(online), On the Premises, July 2010 (Issue 11)		
2010	The Literomancer	The Magazine of Fantasy & Science Fiction, September/October 2010	The Paper Menagerie and Other Stories	Novelette
2010	The Letter	(online), Every Day Fiction, December 5, 2010		
2011	Saving Face	(online), Crossed Genres, January 1, 2011		co-written with Shelly Li
2011	Tying Knots	(online), Clarkesworld Magazine, January 2011		
2011	The Chase	Every Day Fiction, January 28, 2011		
2011	To the Stars	(online), Nature's * "Futures" feature, February 3, 2011		co-written with Shelly Li
2011	Simulacrum	(online), Lightspeed Magazine, February 15, 2011	The Paper Menagerie and Other Stories	
2011	The Paper Menagerie	The Magazine of Fantasy & Science Fiction, March/April 2011.	The Paper Menagerie and Other Stories	
2011	The Visit	(online), On the Premises, March 2011 (Issue 13)		
2011	Ad Block	(online), Kasma SF, March 19, 2011		
2011	Altogether Elsewhere, Vast Herds of Reindeer	The Magazine of Fantasy & Science Fiction, May/June 2011.	The Hidden Girl and Other Stories	
2011	The Caretaker	Digital Science Fiction, June 2011		
2011	Hark! Listen to the Animals	The ePocalypse: e-mails at the end, August 2011; revised Galaxy's Edge, Issue 9, July 2014		co-written with Lisa Tang Liu
2011	The Box That Eats Memories	(online), Daily Science Fiction, August 10, 2011		
2011	Music of the Spheres	Mirror Shards: Exploring the Edges of Augmented Reality (Volume One), 2011		
2011	The Man Who Ended History: A Documentary	Panverse Three, edited by Dario Ciriello, September 2011	The Paper Menagerie and Other Stories	Novella
2011	The Last Seed	(online), Daily Science Fiction, September 26, 2011		
2011	Real Artists	TRSF (September 2011), a special publication of MIT's Technology Review	The Hidden Girl and Other Stories	
2011	Golden Years in the Paleozoic	Andromeda Spaceways Inflight Magazine, Issue #52, September 2011		
2011	Staying Behind	(online), Clarkesworld Magazine, October 1, 2011	The Hidden Girl and Other Stories	
2011	The Countable	Asimov's, December 2011		
2011	Safe Empathy	Daily Science Fiction, November 21, 2011		
2011	Life Plus Seventy	(online), Kasma SF, November 23, 2011	The Hidden Girl and Other Stories	
2011	Justice Fairbot	140 And Counting, edited by Joanne Merriam, December 11, 2011		
2011	The Necrocracy	Penumbra, December 2011		
2012	The Last Summer	10 Flash, January 2012		
2012	The People of Pele	Asimov's, February 2012		
2012	Maxwell's Demon	The Magazine of Fantasy & Science Fiction, January/February 2012	The Hidden Girl and Other Stories	
2012	The Five Elements of the Heart Mind	(online), Lightspeed Magazine, January 24, 2012		
2012	All the Flavors	(online), GigaNotoSaurus, February 2012	The Paper Menagerie and Other Stories	Novella
2012	Memories of My Mother	(online), Daily Science Fiction, March 19, 2012	The Hidden Girl and Other Stories	
2012	Exotic Pets	Buzzy Mag, March 25, 2012		
2012	To the Moon	Fireside, April 17, 2012		
2012	Monkeys	(online), Nature's * "Futures" feature, April 19, 2012		
2012	Intelligent Design	(online), Schrodinger's Mouse, April 2012		
2012	The Shadowcrafter	Nine, Issue 1, April 2012		
2012	The Tome of Tourmaline	(online), Daily Science Fiction, May 9, 2012		
2012	Mono no aware	The Future is Japanese, May 15, 2012; republished (online), Lightspeed Magazine, June 2013	The Paper Menagerie and Other Stories; The Best Science Fiction and Fantasy of the Year: Volume Seven	
2012	The Illusionist	(online), Goldfish Grimm's Spicy Fiction Sushi, Issue 4, June 2, 2012		
2012	Real Faces	F&SF, July/August issue, June 22, 2012		
2012	Celestial Bodies	Nature, June 28, 2012		
2012	The Silk Merchant	Apex, Issue 38, July 3, 2012		
2012	Ask Emily	The Memory Eater Anthology, July 5, 2012		
2012	You'll Always Have the Burden With You	In Situ, Dagan Books, July 10, 2012; republished, Perihelion Science Fiction, December 2013		
2012	Cutting	Electric Velocipede, Issue 24, July 30, 2012	The Hidden Girl and Other Stories	
2012	The Bookmaking Habits of Select Species	Lightspeed, Issue 27, August 7, 2012	The Paper Menagerie and Other Stories	
2012	Arc	F&SF, September/October issue, September 2012	The Passing of the Dragon and Other Stories	
2012	Summer Reading	Daily Science Fiction, September 4, 2012		
2012	The Waves	Liu, Ken (December 2012). "The Waves". Asimov's Science Fiction. 36 (12): 38–51.	The Paper Menagerie and Other Stories	Novelette
2012	The Perfect Book	Analog, December 2012 issue, September 22, 2012		
2012	Drilling	Kasma SF, October 2012		
2012	Pattern Recognition	Diverse Energies, edited by Tobias Buckell and Joe Monti, October 2012.		
2012	The Message	Interzone Issue 242, September 2012.	The Hidden Girl and Other Stories	
2012	Good Hunting	(online), Strange Horizons, October 9, 2012	The Paper Menagerie and Other Stories	
2012	The Tides	Daily Science Fiction, November 1, 2012.		
2012	Always Here	Orson Scott Card’s Intergalactic Medicine Show, Issue 31, November 2012		
2012	The Postman	Orson Scott Card’s Intergalactic Medicine Show, Issue 31, November 2012		
2012	The Perfect Match	(online), Lightspeed Magazine, December 2012	The Paper Menagerie and Other Stories	Novelette
2012	Love Thy Neighbors	Unidentified Funny Objects, December 16, 2012		
2012	The Messenger's Tale	Aoife's Kiss, Issue 43, Winter 2012/2013 issue, December 2012		
2013	A Brief History of the Trans-Pacific Tunnel	The Magazine of Fantasy & Science Fiction, Jan/Feb 2013	The Paper Menagerie and Other Stories	
2013	The mMod	Daily Science Fiction, January 18, 2013.		
2013	The Veiled Shanghai	Oz Reimagined: New Tales from the Emerald City and Beyond, edited by John Joseph Adams and Douglas Cohen, February 26, 2013.		
2013	The Oracle	Liu, Ken (Apr–May 2013). "The Oracle". Asimov's Science Fiction. 37 (4&5): 144–152.		
2013	Linger	Daily Science Fiction, March 12, 2013		
2013	The Clean War	Buzzy Mag, March 15, 2013		co-written with Shelly Li
2013	How Do You Know If a Fish Is Happy?	Fish, March 2013 from Dagan Books		
2013	Build-A-Dolly	Apex, April 2, 2013		
2013	The Shape of Thought	The Other Half of the Sky, edited by Athena Andreadis and Kay Holt, April 2013.		
2013	Sungrazers	Kasma SF, May 2013		
2013	Effect and Cause	Galaxy’s Edge, Issue 2, May 2013.		
2013	The Plague	Nature, May 16, 2013		
2013	The City of Chrysanthemum	Daily Science Fiction, June 12, 2013		
2013	Prosopagnosia	Drabblecast, June 30, 2013		
2013	Echoes in the Dark	Mythic Delirium, Issue 0.1, July–September 2013		
2013	The Litigatrix	GigaNotoSaurus, August 2013		
2013	Nova Verba, Mundus Novus	Daily Science Fiction, August 13, 2013		
2013	The Litigation Master and the Monkey King	(online), Lightspeed Magazine, August 2013	The Paper Menagerie and Other Stories	Novelette
2013	The Call of the Pancake Factory	Drabblecast, August 23, 2013; reprinted in The Cackle of Cthulhu, edited by Alex Shvartsman.		
2013	The Journal	Fireside, Issue 5, September 12, 2013		
2013	The MSG Golem	Unidentified Funny Objects 2, edited by Alex Shvartsman, October 2013		
2013	Ghost Days	Lightspeed, October 22, 2013	The Hidden Girl and Other Stories	Novelette
2013	Here-and-Now	Kasma SF, November 1, 2013		
2013	Before and After	Apex, December 2013		
2014	The Clockwork Soldier	(online), Clarkesworld Magazine, January 2014		
2014	Second Chance	(online), Nature, January 2014		
2014	The Plantimal	Resnick, Mike & Ken Liu (March 2014). "The Plantimal". Asimov's Science Fiction. 38 (3): 13–24.		co-written with Mike Resnick
2014	The Reborn	(online), Tor.com, January 2014	The Hidden Girl and Other Stories	Novelette
2014	What Is Expected of a Wedding Host	(online), Daily Science Fiction, February 2014		
2014	None Owns the Air	Lightspeed Magazine, February 2014		
2014	The Gods Will Not Be Chained	The End is Nigh (Book I of the Apocalypse Triptych), edited by John Joseph Adams and Hugh Howey, March 2014	The Hidden Girl and Other Stories	
2014	The Ten Suns	Dark Expanse: Surviving the Collapse, March 2014		
2014	Lecture 14: Concerning the Event Cloaking Device and Practical Applications Thereof	(online), Cosmos, April 2014		
2014	Knotting Grass, Holding Ring	Long Hidden, edited by Rose Fox and Daniel José Older, May 2014		
2014	What I Assume You Shall Assume	Dead Man's Hand, edited by John Joseph Adams, May 2014		
2014	Seventh Day of the Seventh Moon	(online), Kaleidoscope, edited by Alisa Krasnostein and Julia Rios, August 2014		
2014	In the Loop	War Stories, edited by Andrew Liptak and Jaym Gates, August 2014		
2014	Homo Florensis	Solaris Rising 3, August 2014		
2014	Running Shoes	(online), SQ Mag, Issue 16, September 2014		
2014	The Gods Will Not Be Slain	The End is Now (Book II of the Apocalypse Triptych), edited by John Joseph Adams and Hugh Howey, September 2014	The Hidden Girl and Other Stories	
2014	The Regular	Upgraded, edited by Neil Clarke, September 2014	The Paper Menagerie and Other Stories	Novella
2014	The Ussuri Bear	(online), Beast Within 4: Gears and Growls, edited by Jennifer Brozek, October 2014		
2014	Saboteur	Liu, Ken (December 2014). "Saboteur". Analog Science Fiction and Fact. 134 (12): 68–70.		
2014	Presence	(online), Uncanny, November/December 2014		
2014	The Long Haul: From the Annals of Transportation, The Pacific Monthly, May 2009	(online), Clarkesworld Magazine, November 2014		
2014	The Dust Garden	SFComet, December 2014		
2015	Cassandra	Clarkesworld, March 1, 2015.		
2015	The Gods Have Not Died in Vain	The End Has Come (Book III of the Apocalypse Triptych), edited by John Joseph Adams and Hugh Howey, May 1, 2015	The Hidden Girl and Other Stories; The Best Science Fiction of the Year: Volume 1	
2015	Crystal	Daily Science Fiction, October 15, 2015		
2015	Article I, Section 8, Clause 11	War Stories From the Future, edited by August Cole, November 2015.		
2015	Compatibility	Ecotones, December 2015.		
2016	White Hempen Sleeves	After the Fall, edited by Jaym Gates, 2016		
2016	Of Trees	Part of Herman Chong's exhibit "Ifs, Ands, or Buts" (January 23 to May 3, 2016, at the Rockbund Art Museum in Shanghai)		
2016	An Advanced Reader's Picture Book of Comparative Cognition	The Paper Menagerie and Other Stories, March 8, 2016	The Paper Menagerie and Other Stories	
2016	The Snow Train	Genius Loci: the Spirit of Place, edited by Jaym Gates, June 2016		
2016	Dispatches from the Cradle: The Hermit — Forty-Eight Hours in the Sea of Massachusetts	Drowned Worlds: Tales from the Anthropocene and Beyond, edited by Jonathan Strahan, 2016.	The Hidden Girl and Other Stories; The Best Science Fiction of the Year: Volume 2; The Year’s Best Science Fiction: Thirty-Fourth Annual Collection	
2016	A Brief And Inaccurate But True Account of the Origin of Living Books	Tales of Our Time, November 4, 2016.		
2016	Seven Birthdays	Bridging Infinity, edited by Jonathan Strahan, November 8, 2016	The Hidden Girl and Other Stories; The Best Science Fiction and Fantasy of the Year: Volume Eleven	
2017	Shanghai in 48 Hours, a Weekend Itinerary for International Visitors by Roaming Planets Guides, 2116	Part of the Shanghai Project, an exhibit by the Shanghai Zendai Himalayas Museum, April 22, 2017; reprinted in Deep Signal, June 2019.		
2017	Ticket	Stanford Anthology for Youth, June 2017.		
2017	An Open Letter to the Sentient AI Who Has Announced Its Intention to Take Over the Earth	Unidentified Funny Objects 6, edited by Alex Shvartsman, October 2017		
2017	The Sith of Datawork	From a Certain Point of View (Star Wars), October 3, 2017		
2017	The Hidden Girl	The Book of Swords, edited by Gardner Dozois, October 2017	The Hidden Girl and Other Stories	Novelette
2017	Alter	The Eugene Studio, Japan, published on November 20, 2017; reprinted in subTerrain, 2020.		
2017	The Explainer	CBN Weekly, published on December 21, 2017; English version published in Lightspeed's special 100th issue, September 2018.		
2018	Quality Time	Robots vs. Fairies, edited by Navah Wolfe and Dominik Parisien, January 2018		Novelette
2018	Cosmic Spring	Lightspeed, March 15, 2018	The Passing of the Dragon and Other Stories	
2018	The Magic Paintbrush	Jali, edited by Ellah Wakatama Allfrey for Audible, April 2018		
2018	Byzantine Empathy	MIT Technology Review’s Twelve Tomorrows, edited by Wade Roush, May 2018	The Hidden Girl and Other Stories	Novelette
2018	The Trustless	Wired, December 17, 2018		
2019	Thoughts and Prayers	Slate, January 26, 2019	The Hidden Girl and Other Stories; The Best American Science Fiction and Fantasy 2020; The Big Book of Cyberpunk	
2019	Love's Mirror	Deep Signal, June 2019		
2019	BookSavr	F&SF, September/October 2019.		
2019	The Moon Carver	The Other Animals, Audible Original edited by Rachel Hamburg, November 14, 2019.	The Passing of the Dragon and Other Stories	
2020	How to Survive the Next Science Fictional Disaster, A Guide for the Wise	L'Uomo, February 2020.		
2020	How to Build a Dragon at the End of Time	Sub-Q, February 2020		Interactive fiction
2020	Grey Rabbit, Crimson Mare, Coal Leopard	The Hidden Girl and Other Stories, February 25, 2020.	The Hidden Girl and Other Stories	Novelette
2020	Uma	Avatars, Inc, from XPrize, edited by Ann VanderMeer, March 13, 2020.		
2020	Idols	Made to Order: Robots and Revolution, edited by Jonathan Strahan, March 17, 2020.	The Passing of the Dragon and Other Stories	
2020	A Whisper of Blue	The Book of Dragons, edited by Jonathan Strahan, July 7, 2020	The Passing of the Dragon and Other Stories	Novelette
2020	50 Things Every AI Working with Humans Should Know	Uncanny, November 3, 2020	The Passing of the Dragon and Other Stories	
2020	The Cleaners	Liu, Ken (2 December 2020). "A Time to Reflect". kenliu.substack.com.	The Passing of the Dragon and Other Stories; The Best American Science Fiction and Fantasy 2021	
2021	Excerpt from Theuth, an Oral History of Work in the Age of Machine-Assisted Cognition	Philosophy Through Science Fiction Stories, Bloomsbury Press, edited by Helen De Cruz, Johan De Smedt, and Eric Schwitzgebel, January 2021.		
2021	The Armies of Those I Love	Audible Original (February 25, 2021)	The Passing of the Dragon and Other Stories	Novella
2021	Jaunt	Make Shift: Dispatches from the Post-Pandemic Future, edited by Gideon Lichfield, published by MIT Press (part of the Twelve Tomorrows series), March 2021.		
2022	Evaluative Soliloquies	Part of Google's experimental AI Wordcraft Writers Workshop, November 2, 2022.		
2022	Timekeeper's Symphony	Clarkesworld, September 2022	The Passing of the Dragon and Other Stories	
2023	Invasive Species	Newsweek Japan (Japanese translation), February 7, 2023.		
2023	Collaboration?	Uncanny, January 3, 2023		co-written with Caroline M. Yoachim
2023	The Emperor's New Servers	The Oracle, Story Summit 2022, hosted by Alexandria Labs, March 27, 2023.		
2023	The Edges of Wilderness	The Continental Literary Magazine, April 18, 2023.		
2023	Good Spells	Book of Witches, edited by Jonathan Strahan, August 1, 2023.	The Passing of the Dragon and Other Stories	
2023	The Passing of the Dragon	Tor.com, September 13, 2023	The Passing of the Dragon and Other Stories	
2023	Good Stories	The Digital Aesthete: Human Musings on the Intersection of Art and AI, edited by Alex Shvartsman, November 2023.		
2023	The Ice Wraith	Mythopoesis for Techno-Living Systems, edited by Ursula Mayer and Rachel Hill, December 2023.	The Passing of the Dragon and Other Stories	
2024	Grief Is a Green Leaf	Games to Bind Us, edited by Kathryn Hymes and Hakan Seyalioglu, July 2024.		
2024	Three Views of a Parking Lot	The Sunday Morning Transport, October 6, 2024.	The Passing of the Dragon and Other Stories	
2025	If a Digitized Tree Falls	Reactor, September 10, 2025		co-written with Caroline M. Yoachim

=== Translations ===
Classics

- Laozi's Dao De Jing: A New Interpretation for a Transformative Time, May 2023

Full Length Novels

- Vagabonds by Hao Jingfang, April 2020
- The Waste Tide by Chen Qiufan, April 2019

Short works

- "Fields of Gold" by Liu Cixin, May 2018
- "The Robot Who Liked to Tell Tall Tales" by Fei Dao, Clarkesworld Magazine, April 2017
- "The Snow of Jinyang" by Zhang Ran, ,Clarkesworld Magazine, June 2016
- "The Flower of Shazui" by Chen Qiufan, Interzone, November 2012
- "Taking Care of God" by Liu Cixin (online), Pathlight, March 2012
- "A Hundred Ghosts Parade Tonight" by Xia Jia (online), Clarkesworld Magazine, February 2012
- "The City of Silence" by Ma Boyong
- "The Mark Twain Robots" by Ma Boyong, TRSF (September 2011), a special publication of MIT's Technology Review
- "The Fish of Lijiang" by Chen Qiufan (online), Clarkesworld Magazine, August 2011
- "Gathered in Translation", an essay on the process and subtleties of translating Chinese SF to English, and the reverse: online at Clarkesworld Magazine, April 2013

Remembrance of Earth's Past Series

- Book 1: The Three-Body Problem, Tor Books, November 2014 (originally the Chinese language novel Three Body, 三体, 2008, by Liu Cixin)
- Book 3: Death's End, Tor Books, September 2016 by Liu Cixin (originally the Chinese language novel Death's End, 死神永生, 2010 by Liu Cixin)
- Book 4: The Redemption of Time, Tor Books, 2019 by Baoshu (originally a Chinese fanfic by Li Jun that was regularized by the original publisher Chongqing Press and series creator Cixin Liu; and published in 2011)

=== Liu's works in translation ===
Many of Liu's short stories have been translated into Chinese, Japanese, French, Spanish, and multiple other languages and published in short story collections:

Chinese

- 爱的算法 ("Algorithms for Love and Others"), published by SFW Publishing, September 5, 2012
- 思维的形状 ("The Shape of Thought and Others"), published by Tsinghua University Press, November 11, 2014
- 杀敌算法 ("In the Loop and Others"), published by SFW Publishing, March, 2015
- 奇点遗民 ("Staying Behind")，published by CITIC, 2017

Japanese

- 紙の動物園 ("The Paper Menagerie"), published by Hayakawa, edited by 古沢嘉通 (Yoshimichi Furusawa), April 2015

French

- La Ménagerie de papier ("The Paper Menagerie") published by Editions du Bélial, edited by Ellen Herzfeld and Dominique Martel, 2015.
- Jardins de poussière ("Dust Gardens") published by Editions du Bélial, edited by Ellen Herzfeld and Dominique Martel, 2019.

Spanish

- El zoo de papel y otros relatos ("The Paper Menagerie") published by Runas, Alianza Editorial, edited by María Pilar San Román Navarro, 2017.
