= Chinese science fiction =

Genre of speculative fiction

Chinese science fiction (Chinese: 科幻; pinyin: kēhuàn; lit. 'scientific fantasy') is genre of literature that concerns itself with hypothetical future social and technological developments in the Sinosphere.

== History by country or region ==
=== Mainland China ===
==== Late-Qing Dynasty ====
Late Qing-era reformist intellectuals used the foreign genre of science fiction to project their teleological view of national rejuvenation and technological development. Academic Mingwei Song summarizes that from its inception, Chinese science fiction was "mainly a utopian narrative that projected the political desire for China's reform into an idealized technologically more advanced world" with the premise that "China would become a superpower." These works also sought to advance China's modernization by encouraging interest in modern science and technology and by exploring imagined developmental paths for China and its then-current position in the modern world.

Among the early writers of science fiction in China was Liang Qichao, whose 1902 novel The Future of New China described potential political reforms for the self-strengthening of China and its development to world power status.

With his translation of Jules Verne's 1888 novel Two Years' Vacation into Classical Chinese (as Fifteen Little Heroes), Liang Qichao became one of the first and most influential advocates of science fiction in Chinese.

In 1903, Lu Xun, who later became famous for his darkly satirical essays and short stories, translated Jules Verne's From the Earth to the Moon and Journey to the Centre of the Earth from Japanese into Classical Chinese (rendering it in the traditional zhang wei ban style and adding expository notes) while studying medicine at the Kobun Institute (弘文學院 Kobun Gakuin) in Japan. He would continue to translate many of Verne's and H. G. Wells's classic stories, nationally popularizing these through periodical publication.

The earliest work of original science fiction in Chinese is believed to be the unfinished novel Lunar Colony (月球殖民地小說), published in 1904 by an unknown author under the pen name Old Fisherman of the Secluded River (荒江釣叟). The story concerns Long Menghua, who flees China with his wife after killing a government official who was harassing his wife's family. The ship they escape on is accidentally sunk and Long's wife disappears. However, Long is rescued by Otoro Tama, the Japanese inventor of a dirigible who helps him travel to Southeast Asia searching for his wife. They join with a group of anti-Qing martial artists to rescue her from bandits. Deciding that the nations of the world are too corrupt, they all travel to the Moon and establish a new colony.

Early science fiction novels include:

- 1908 New Era (novel)
- 1910 Xin Zhongguo

==== Republican Era ====
Following the collapse of the Qing-dynasty in 1911, China went through a series of dramatic social and political changes which affected the genre of science fiction tremendously. Following the May Fourth Movement in 1919 written vernacular Chinese began to replace Classical Chinese as the written language. China's earliest purely literary periodical, Forest of Fiction (小說林), founded by Xu Nianci, not only published translated science fiction, but also original science fiction such as A Tale of New Mr. Braggadocio (新法螺先生譚). Meanwhile, Lao She employed science fiction for the purpose of social criticism in his science fiction novel Cat Country which was also published during this time period.

=== People's Republic of China ===
==== 1949–1966 ====
Following the Chinese Civil War (1945–1949) and the establishment of the People's Republic of China, works with an ethos of socialist realism inspired by Soviet science fiction became more common while others works were suppressed. Still, many original works were created during this time, particularly ones with "popular science" approach aim to popularize science among younger readers and promote the country's "wonderful socialist future." A surge of science fantasy writing, which emphasized technological marvels and novelties, occurred from the mid-1950s to the 1960s. Academic Rudolf Wagner writes that this trend was influenced by the Marching Toward Science campaign.

Zheng Wenguang in particular is known as the 'father of Chinese science fiction' for his writings during this period up until the beginning of Cultural Revolution (1966–1976) when the printing of non-revolutionary literature was suspended.

==== 1978–1983 ====
During the Cultural Revolution, very little literature was printed and science fiction essentially disappeared in mainland China. However, following the March 1978 National Science Congress convened by the Central Committee and the State Council and its proclamation that "science's spring has come," a greater enthusiasm for popular science (and thus science fiction) followed, with the publication of the children's novel Ye Yonglie's Xiao Lingtong's Travels in the Future (小灵通漫游未来) in the same year as the 1978 National Science Congress marked a revival of science fiction literature in China.

In 1979, the newly founded magazine Scientific Literature (科学文艺) began publishing translations and original science fiction and Zheng Wenguang again devoted himself to writing science fiction during this period. Tong Enzheng wrote Death Ray on a Coral Island, which was later adapted into China's first science fiction movie. Other important writers from this time period include Liu Xingshi, Wang Xiaoda, and Hong Kong author Ni Kuang. In his monograph, Rudolf G. Wagner argues during this brief rebirth of science fiction in China scientists used the genre to symbolically describe the political and social standing to which the scientific community desired following its own rehabilitation.

During the Anti-Spiritual Pollution Campaign (1983–1984), influential people including Qian Xuesen criticized the science fiction genre for promoting irrational and unscientific ideas. This Campaign led to authors such as Ye Yonglie, Tong Enzheng, Liu Xingshi, and Xiao Jianheng being condemned for slander and the publication of science-fiction in mainland China once again being prohibited indefinitely. The legacy of the Anti-Spiritual Pollution Campaign is one reason for the relative prominence of hard science fiction within the genre in China.

==== 1989–present ====
Liu Cixin's 1989 novel China 2185 formed an important part of the "new wave" in Chinese science fiction and is often regarded as China's firsy cyberpunk novel. It portrays how the digital reanimation of elders, including a digital clone of Mao Zedong, trigger a cyber uprising in China. One of the digital beings and its digital clones establish a cyber government named The Republic of Huaxia. The novel critiques both liberal democracy and the cultural conservatism shown by the Republic of Huaxia.

In 1991, Yang Xiao, then the director of the magazine Scientific Art and Literature which had survived the ban on science fiction during the 1980s by changing their name to Strange Tales and publishing non-fiction works, decided to run a science fiction convention in Chengdu, Sichuan. Not only was this the first-ever international science fiction convention to be held in mainland China, it was also the first international event to be hosted in China since the student protests of 1989. Scientific Literature changed its name to Science Fiction World (科幻世界), and by the mid-1990s, had reached a peak circulation of about 400,000. Authors who came to prominence during the 1990s include Liu Cixin, Han Song, Wang Jinkang, Xing He, Qian Lifang, and He Xi. In particular, Liu, Han and Wang became popularly known as the 'Three Generals of Chinese Sci-fi'. As a genre, science fiction came to the fore when the 1999 national college entrance exam included the science fiction question, "What if memories could be transplanted?" By the late 1990s, Chinese science fiction transitioned from being a fringe literary genre to one with global significance.

Wang Jinkang is the most prolific of the China's 'Three Generals' of sci-fi, having published over 50 short stories and 10 novels. While working as a chassis engineer for oil rigs, he began writing short stories as a way to entertain his son and teach him scientific concepts, a focus he has maintained throughout his writing career. In an article published in the Commercial Press's bi-monthly magazine on Chinese culture, The World of Chinese, Echo Zhao (赵蕾) describes his writing as being pervaded with "a sense of heroic morality" that avoids the "grim finality" of an apocalyptic future, citing examples of clones with bumps on their fingers to distinguish them from non-clones and robots whose hearts explode when they desire life.

Liu Cixin's work has been especially well-received, with his Three Bodies (三体) trilogy selling over 500,000 copies in China (as of the end of 2012). The books, which describe an alien civilization that invades earth over a vast span of time, have drawn comparisons to the works of Arthur C. Clarke by fellow science fiction author Fei Dao, while Echo Zhao describes Liu Cixin's writing as "lush and imaginative" with a particular interest in military technology.

Han Song, a journalist, writes darkly satirical novels and short stories which lampoon modern social problems. His novel 2066: Red Star Over America deals with a United States declined into civil war and a China which has obtained superpower status through reliance on an intelligence called "Amando"; among its themes are nationalism and globalism. His short story collection Subway which features alien abductions and cannibalism on a never-ending train ride, have been lauded for their sense of social justice. He has been quoted as saying, "It's not easy for foreigners to understand China and the Chinese. They need to develop a dialectical understanding, see all sides, just as we appreciate the 'yin' and the 'yang.' I hope to prevent tragedy in China, and in the world, with my writing. I don't think humans have rid themselves of their innate evil. It's just suppressed by technology. If there is a spark of chaos, the worst will happen. That goes for all people, whether Chinese or Western. We should keep thinking back to why terrible things have happened in history and not allow those things to happen again".

Hao Jingfang won the Hugo Award for Best Novelette for Folding Beijing in 2016.

Meanwhile, in the area of film and television, works such as the science fiction comedy Magic Cellphone (魔幻手机) explored themes of time travel and advanced technology. On March 31, 2011, however the State Administration of Radio, Film, and Television (SARFT) issued guidelines that supposedly strongly discouraged television storylines including "fantasy, time-travel, random compilations of mythical stories, bizarre plots, absurd techniques, even propagating feudal superstitions, fatalism and reincarnation, ambiguous moral lessons, and a lack of positive thinking". However, even with that numerous science fiction literature with those themes and elements have been published since, some of which have been compiled into an English-language anthology by Ken Liu called Broken Stars: Contemporary Chinese Science Fiction in Translation. Liu's translations have been credited with significantly improving the English-language readers familiarity with Chinese sf.

Science fiction authors from mainland China, whose work has also been published in English or German, furthermore include A Que (阿缺), Cheng Jingbo (程婧波), Fei Dao (飞氘), Gu Shi (顾适), Ling Chen (凌晨), Liu Yang (刘洋), Luo Longxiang (罗隆翔), Shuang Chimu (双翅目), Sun Wanglu (孙望路) and Zhang Ran (张冉).

The growth of the genre in China is often interpreted as a signifier of China's rapid technological development, particularly in areas like space exploration and artificial intelligence.

As of 2025, the growth of science fiction in China has been substantial, although it remains less popular in comparison to other genres of fiction.

=== Taiwan ===
Following the defeat of the Qing Dynasty in the First Sino-Japanese War (1894–1895), the island of Taiwan came under the sovereign rule to the Empire of Japan who eventually instituted a policy of 'Japanization' that discouraged the use of Chinese language and scripts in Taiwan. When the island was ceded to the Republic of China after the end of World War II in 1945, the majority of Japanese colonialists were repatriated to Japan and the Chinese Nationalist Party, the ruling party of the RoC, quickly established control of the island. This was to prove key to the survival of the RoC government, who were forced to move their capital to the island after their defeat by the communists in the Chinese Civil War. The CNP pursued a policy of rapid sinification which, in combination with an influx of mainland intellectuals, spurred the development of Chinese-language literature in Taiwan and along with it, science fiction.

Taiwanese science fiction authors include Wu Mingyi (吳明益), Zhang Xiaofeng (張曉風), Zhang Xiguo (张系国), Huang Hai (黃海), Huang Fan (黃凡), Ye Yandou (葉言都), Lin Yaode (林燿德), Zhang Dachun (張大春), Su Yiping (蘇逸平), Chi Ta-wei (紀大偉), Hong Ling (洪凌), Ye Xuan (葉軒), Mo Handu (漠寒渡), Yu Wo (御我), and Mo Ren (莫仁).

=== Hong Kong ===
In Chinese, Hong Kong's best known science fiction author is the prolific Ni Kuang, creator of the Wisely Series (衛斯理). More recently, Chan Koonchung's dystopian novel The Fat Years about a near future mainland China has been compared to George Orwell's Nineteen Eighty-Four and Aldous Huxley's Brave New World. Huang Yi is another well known Wuxia and science fiction author whose time travel novel Xun Qin Ji (Chinese: 尋秦記) was adapted into a popular TV drama called A Step into the Past by TVB.

=== Malaysia ===
Zhang Cao (張草) is a Malaysian-Chinese science fiction author who has published several novels in Chinese.

== Chinese language and culture in science fiction works from other countries ==
- Cordwainer Smith's short stories and novel, Norstrilia, which is said to be based on the Chinese classic Journey to the West, feature a race of 'underpeople' bred out of animals to serve mankind whose struggle for independence has been argued to be an allegory of the civil rights movement. Alan C. Elms, Professor of Psychology Emeritus, University of California, Davis, however argues that underpeople are meant to represent the Han Chinese who had been oppressed by the conquering Manchus during the Qing dynasty, citing the author's experiences working with Sun Yat Sen as a young man.
- An English translation of the Tao Te Ching plays an important role in Ursula K. Le Guin's 1967 post-apocalyptic novel City of Illusions. The novel also features a supposedly alien race called the Shing who suppress technological and social development on Earth, similar to the suppression of Western technology and ideas during the Qing dynasty following a period of relative openness during the Ming when Jesuit missionaries such as Matteo Ricci were allowed to live and teach in China.
- Although not strictly science fiction in that it lacks significant aberrations from the historical record, James Clavell's historical fiction series The Asian Saga is intimately concerned with the role which modern technology played in the collision between the East and West in the 19th and 20th centuries.
- David Wingrove's multivolume Chung Kuo series takes place in an alternate timeline where Imperial China has survived into modern era and eventually takes over the entire world, establishing a future society with a strict racial hierarchy.
- Maureen F. McHugh's 1997 novel, China Mountain Zhang, takes place in an alternate future where America has gone through a socialist revolution while China has become the dominant world power.
- The 2002 American television show Firefly features a future space-based society in the year 2517 where Mandarin Chinese has become a common language.
- Cory Doctorow's 2010 young adult science fiction novel For the Win features a gold farmer from Shenzhen, China who joins forces with Leonard Goldberg, a sinophile gamer who speaks Mandarin Chinese and uses the Chinese name 'Wei-Dong', to take on the mainland authorities and gold farming bosses.
- The 2012 American film Red Dawn, a re-imagining of the 1984 film by the same name, as originally filmed portrayed the invasion of the United States by the People's Liberation Army of the PRC due to a US default on Chinese-owned debt. In hopes of being able to market the film in mainland China, the country of origin for the invading army was later changed to North Korea using digital technology, and references to the storyline about debt were edited out of the final cut of the film.
- The titular computer virus in American author Neal Stephenson's 2011 technothriller Reamde was developed by a crew of mainland Chinese based gold farmers and a significant portion of the book takes place in Xiamen, Fujian.
- The prolific short story writer Chinese-American Ken Liu has published numerous original English-language science fiction stories featuring Chinese characters and settings, exploring issues of tradition, modernity, development, and cultural differences between the East and West. Two of his stories have also been published in Chinese, and he has translated short stories by Liu Cixin, Chen Qiufan, Xia Jia and Ma Boyong.

== Genres and themes ==
A core theme of Chinese science fiction since the genre's inception has included the country's efforts at national rejuvenation.

Mainland Chinese science fiction is restricted from covering certain themes due to restrictive government law and censorship, which results in self-censorship. Some of the affected genres and themes include alternate history and time travel, which can run afoul of the laws related to perceived lack of respect towards Chinese history. Concerns over censorship also resulted in the Hugo controversy at the 81st World Science Fiction Convention. The resurgence of Chinese sci-fi is associated with sinofuturism, with writers exploring themes such as Western and Orientalist perceptions of a technological China and its potential hegemony.

== English translations and academic studies ==
Joel Martinsen, a translator who works for the website Danwei.org, has promoted Chinese science fiction in English for a number of years, both on his blog Twelve Hours Later: Literature from the other side of the globe – Chinese SF, fantasy, and mainstream fiction and also on various websites around the Internet, often posting under the username 'zhwj'. Along with Ken Liu and Eric Abrahamsen, Martinesen translated Liu Cixin's "Three Body" trilogy for China Educational Publications Import & Export Corporation (CEPIT), with print and digital editions of the first two novels released in the first half of 2013 and the third in 2014.

The second issue of the literary monthly Chutzpah! edited by Ou Ning contains a in-depth history of Chinese fiction compiled by Kun Kun entitled Some of Us Are Looking at the Stars, and translations of Chinese science fiction authors Han Song, Fei Dao, Chen Qiufan, Yang Ping into English, in addition to translations of English-language science fiction authors such as William Gibson, Neal Stephenson, Paolo Bagicalupi, and Jeff Noon into Chinese.

In 2012, the Hong Kong journal Renditions: A Chinese-English Translation Magazine issued a special double issue (Renditions No. 77 & 78) with a focus on science fiction, including works from both the early 20th century and the early 21st century. In March 2013, the peer-reviewed journal Science Fiction Studies released a special issue on Chinese Science Fiction, edited by Yan Wu and Veronica Hollinger.

Through the Tor Books division, Macmillan Publishers publishes most of the English translated novels in the United States, including the entire Three Body series. Worthy of note are also the entries on Chinese science fiction mainly written by Jonathan Clements for The Encyclopedia of Science Fiction.

In recent years, several anthologies of Chinese science fiction short stories have been published in English. These include Invisible Planets (2016), Broken Stars (2020) and Sinopticon (2021). Also published are three collections of Liu Cixin's work: The Wandering Earth (2016), To Hold Up the Sky (2020), and A View from the Stars (2024). Additional translated Chinese SF short stories can be found in World SF story collections, such as those edited by Lavie Tidhar.

In other European publishing markets, such as Italy, many translations are based on the English versions. While in the 2010s a few anthologies were translated from Chinese into Italian, in 2017 the Italian translation of Liu Cixin's 三体 was translated from Ken Liu's English version.

== Awards ==
=== Chinese Nebula Awards ===
The World Chinese Science Fiction Association, based in Chengdu, established the Nebula Awards (Chinese: 星云奖; pinyin: xingyun jiang) – not to be confused with the U.S. Nebula Awards – in 2010. They are awarded yearly for Chinese-language works of science fiction published in any country. The winners are selected by a jury from a list nominees determined by public voting; in 2013, more than 30,000 votes were cast for 40 nominees.

Past winners include:

Best novel

- 2024: The City in the Well (井中之城) by Liu Yang
- 2023: Once Upon a Time in Nanjing by Tianrui Shuofu
- 2022: The New New Newspaper Press: Shadow of the Enchanted Metropolis by Liang Qingsan
- 2021: Across the Rings of Saturn by Xie Yunning
- 2020: The Stars (群星) by Qi Yue
  - Conferral of the 11th round of Chinese Nebula awards was postponed until 2021 due to the COVID-19 pandemic.
- 2019: The Azure Tragedy by Hui Hu
- 2018: Gate of Memories by Jiang Bo
- 2017: Exorcism (驱魔) by Han Song
  - Exorcism is a sequel to Han's 2016 novel Hospital
- 2014: Ruins of Time by Baoshu
- 2013: The Waste Tide by Chen Qiufan
- 2012: Be with Me by Wang Jinkang
- 2011: Death's End (死神永生) by Liu Cixin
- 2010: Cross by Wang Jinkang, and Humanoid Software by Albert Tan

Best novella

- 2024: The Fleeting Gravity of Words (失重的语言) by Zhou Wen
- 2023: The Girl with a Restrained and Released Life by Zhou Wen
- 2022: The Eye of Saishiteng by Wanxiang Fengnian
- 2021: The Persons who are Trapped in Time by Cheng Jingbo
- 2020: Celestial Priest (天象祭司) by Baoshu
  - Conferral of the 11th round of Chinese Nebula awards was postponed until 2021 due to the COVID-19 pandemic.
- 2019: Flowers on the Other Side by A Que
- 2018: The Monster Reunion by Chen Qiufan
- 2017: Farewell, Doraemon by A Que
- 2012: Excess of the World by Zhang Xiguo
- 2010: not awarded

Best short story

- 2024: "Let the White Deer Roam" (且放白鹿) by Cheng Jingbo
- 2023: "The Stars without Dream" by Chi Hui
- 2022: "Lunar Bank" by Liang Ling
- 2021: "Preface to the Reprint Edition of 'Overture 2181'" by Gu Shi
- 2020: "In This Moment, We Are Happy" (这一刻我们是快乐的) by Chen Qiufan
  - Conferral of the 11th round of Chinese Nebula awards was postponed until 2021 due to the COVID-19 pandemic.
- 2019: "The Kites of Jinan" by Liang Qingsan
- 2018: "Memories of Chengdu" by Baoshu
- 2017: "Floating Life" (浮生) by He Xi
- 2014: "Smart Life" by Ping Zongqi
- 2012: G stands for Goddess by Chen Qiufan
- 2011: Rebirth Brick by Han Song
- 2010: Before the Fall by Cheng Jingbo

=== Galaxy Awards ===
Another award for Chinese-language works of science fiction and science fantasy. The award was first set up in 1985, and was exclusively organized by the Science Fiction World Magazine after its first session. Before 1991 the award was awarded intermittently, and it became an annual event since 1991. The 27th Galaxy Award was given out and the winner list was published in public.

Past winners include:

Best novel

- 2015: "Tian Nian" (天年) by He Xi

Best novella

- 2015:"The Way of Machines" (機器之道) by Jiang Bo
- 2015: "When The Sun Falls" (太陽墜落之時) by Zhangran

Best Short Story

- 2015:"Good Night Melancholy" (晚安憂鬱) by Xia Jia
- 2015:"Balin" (巴鱗) by Chen Qiufan
- 2015: "Yingxu Zhizi" (應許之子) by Ms Quanru
