= Broken Stars (anthology) =

Chinese science fiction anthology from 2019

- Editor: Ken Liu
- Author: Xia Jia, Liu Cixin, Tang Fei, Han Song, Cheng Jingbo, Baoshu, Hao Jingfang, Fei Dao, Zhang Ran, Anna Wu, Ma Boyong, Gu Shi, Regina Kanyu Wang and Chen Qiufan
- Translator: Ken Liu
- Language: English
- Genre: Science fiction, hard science fiction
- Publisher: Tor Books
- Publication date: April 14, 2020
- Publication place: United States
- Media type: Print, ebook
- Pages: 480 pp
- ISBN: 9781250297686 (paperback 1st ed)
- Website: Official website Official website

Broken Stars (or Broken Stars: Contemporary Chinese Science Fiction in Translation) is a science fiction anthology edited and translated by Ken Liu composed of sixteen short stories as well as three essays by different Chinese writers, namely Xia Jia, Liu Cixin, Tang Fei, Han Song, Cheng Jingbo, Baoshu, Hao Jingfang, Fei Dao, Zhang Ran, Anna Wu, Ma Boyong, Gu Shi, Regina Kanyu Wang and Chen Qiufan. It was published by Tor Books in April 2020.

== Contents ==
=== Short stories ===
- "Goodnight, Melancholy" (晚安，忧郁) by Xia Jia, first published in Chinese in June 2015 in Science Fiction World, first published in English in Clarkesworld in March 2017
- "Moonlight" (月夜) by Liu Cixin, first published in Chinese in February 2009 in Life, first published in English in this anthology
- "Broken Stars" (碎星星) by Tang Fei, first published in Chinese in September 2016 in ZUI Found, first published in English in SQ Mag in January 2016
- "Submarines" (潜艇) by Han Song, first published in Chinese on November 17, 2014 in Southern People Weekly, first published in English in this anthology
- "Salinger and the Koreans" (塞林格与朝鲜人) by Han Song, first published in Chinese and English in 2016 in Tales of Our Time (故事新编)
- "Under a Dangling Sky" (倒悬的天空) by Cheng Jingbo, first published in Chinese in December 2004 in Science Fiction World, first published in English in this anthology
- "What Has Passed Shall in Kinder Light Appear" (大时代) by Baoshu, not published in Chinese, first published in English in March–April 2015 in The Magazine of Fantasy & Science Fiction
- "The New Year Train" (过年回家) by Hao Jingfang, first published in Chinese in January 2017 in ELLE China, first published in English in this anthology
- "The Robot Who Liked to Tell Tall Tales" (爱吹牛的机器人) by Fei Dao, first published in Chinese in November 2014 in ZUI Found, first published in English in Clarkesworld in April 2017
- "The Snow of Jinyang" (晋阳三尺雪) by Zhang Ran, first published in Chinese in January 2014 in New Science Fiction, first published in English in Clarkesworld in June 2016
- "The Restaurant at the End of the Universe: Laba Porridge" (宇宙尽头的餐馆腊八粥) by Anna Wu, first published in Chinese in May 2014 in ZUI Novel, first published in English in Galaxy's Edge in May 2015
- "The First Emperor's Games" (秦始皇的假期) by Ma Boyong, first published in Chinese in June 2010 in Play, first published in English in this anthology
- "Reflection" (倒影) by Gu Shi, first published in Chinese in July 2013 in Super Nice Magazine, first published in English in this anthology
- "The Brain Box" (脑匣) by Regina Kanyu Wang, not published in Chinese, first published in English in this anthology
- "Coming of the Light" (开光) by Chen Qiufan, first published in Chinese in January 2015 in Offline Hacker, first published in English in Clarkesworld in March 2015
- "A History of Future Illnesses" (未来病史) by Chen Qiufan, first published in Chinese in April–December 2012 in ZUI Found, first published in English in Pathlight No. 2 in 2016

=== Essays ===
- "A Brief Introduction to Chinese Science Fiction and Fandom" by Regina Kanyu Wang
- "A New Continent for China Scholars: Chinese Science Fiction Studies" by Mingwei Song
- "Science Fiction: Embarrassing No More" (科幻：一种被治愈的尴尬症) by Fei Dao

== Reception ==
=== Reviews ===
Gary K. Wolfe wrote in the Locus Magazine that "the contributors here may not show much interest in outer space or other traditional SF tropes, but they seem fascinated with questions of time and consciousness." He further wrote, that "some of the other stories reflect the blurring of genre and mainstream boundaries that has been increasingly common in much short fiction worldwide" and that the anthology "demonstrates that contemporary Chinese SF is as multilateral as any SF in terms of theme and form, and just as varied in style." Concerning the translation, he wrote that "Liu's translation skills, in a couple of instances in collaboration with Carmen Yiling Yan, manage to effectively convey a myriad of distinctive voices without ever ironing over the differences or compromising the readability of the whole."

Erik Hendriksen noted in the Reactor Magazine that "takes a significantly broader look at Chinese science fiction than its predecessor [Invisible Planets] did, with over a dozen authors represented." He wrote that "not every story will click with every reader, but a few standouts will captivate all but the crankiest of readers", giving "What Has Passed Shall in Kinder Light Appear" and "The Snow of Jinyang" as an example.

Rachel S. Cordasco wrote in World Literature Today that "while all these stories can be classified as "science fiction," they successfully push the boundaries of that category, with some leaning more toward the fantastic and mystical, and others taking the historical or hard sf route." She concludes, that "Broken Stars, like Invisible Planets before it, is indeed a praiseworthy accomplishment and a gift for all readers."

Publishers Weekly wrote that the "book's most provocative stories offer variations on the time travel theme" and that the essays will "further enlighten Western readers, who will be very excited by these outstanding works."

=== Awards ===
"Goodnight, Melancholy" won the Galaxy Award in 2015.

== See also ==
- Invisible Planets and Sinopticon, other anthologies of Chinese science fiction
