= Invisible Planets =

Chinese science fiction anthology from 2016

- Author: Chen Qiufan, Xia Jia, Ma Boyong, Hao Jingfang, Tang Fei, Cheng Jingbo and Liu Cixin
- Translator: Ken Liu
- Language: English
- Genre: Science fiction, Hard science fiction
- Publisher: Tor Books
- Publication date: 2016-11-03
- Pages: 400
- ISBN: 9781784978815

Invisible Planets (or Invisible Planets: Contemporary Chinese Science Fiction in Translation) is a science-fiction anthology edited and translated by Ken Liu composed of thirteen short stories as well as three essays by different Chinese writers, namely Chen Qiufan, Xia Jia, Ma Boyong, Hao Jingfang, Tang Fei, Cheng Jingbo and Liu Cixin. It was published by Head of Zeus in March 2016. It contains the novelette "Folding Beijing", which won the Hugo Award for Best Novelette in 2016, which also marked the first time a Chinese woman has won the award.

== Contents ==
=== Short stories ===
- "The Year of the Rat" by Chen Qiufan, first published in Chinese in Science Fiction World in May 2009, first published in English in The Magazine of Fantasy & Science Fiction in July/August 2013
- "The Fish of Lijiang" by Chen Qiufan, first published in Chinese in Science Fiction World in May 2006, first published in English in Clarkesworld in August 2011
- "The Flower of Shazui" by Chen Qiufan, first published in Chinese in ZUI Ink-Minority Report in 2012, first published in English in Interzone in November-December 2012
- "A Hundred Ghosts Parade Tonight" by Xia Jia, first published in Chinese in Science Fiction World in August 2010, first published in English in Clarkesworld in February 2012
- "Tontong's Summer" by Xia Jia, first published in Chinese in ZUI Novel in March 2014, first published in English in Upgraded in 2014
- "Night Journey of the Dragon-House" by Xia Jia, first published in English in this anthology
- "The City of Silence" by Ma Boyong, first published in Chinese in May 2005 in Science Fiction World, first published in English in World SF Blog in November 2011
- "Invisible Planets" by Hao Jingfang, first published in Chinese in New Science Fiction in February-April 2010, first published in English in Lightspeed in December 2013
- "Folding Beijing" by Hao Jingfang, first published in Chinese in February 2014 in ZUI Found, first published in English in Uncanny in January–February 2015
- "Call Girl" by Tang Fei, first published in Chinese in Nebula in August 2014, first published in English in Apex in June 2013
- "Grave of the Fireflies" by Cheng Jingbo, first published in Chinese in Science Fiction: Literary in July 2005, first published in English in Clarkesworld in January 2014
- "The Circle" by Liu Cixin, first published in English in Carbide Tipped Pens in 2014
- "Taking Care of God" by Liu Cixin, first published in Chinese in Science Fiction World in January 2005, first published in English in Pathlight in April 2012

=== Essays ===
- "The Worst of All Possible Universes and the Best of All Possible Earths: Three-Body and Chinese Science-Fiction" by Liu Cixin, first published on May 7, 2014 on Tor.com
- "The Torn Generation: Chinese Science Fiction in a Culture in Transition" by Chen Qiufan, first published on May 15, 2014 on Tor.com
- "What makes Chinese Science Fiction Chinese?" by Xia Jia, first published on July 22, 2014 on Tor.com

== Background ==
In April 2017, Hao Jingfang announced that "Folding Beijing" would be adapted into a movie titled Folding City directed by Josh Kim by Wanda Media. In 2024, the movie is still in development.

"Taking Care of God" also appeared in the collection The Wandering Earth by Liu Cixin and has a sequel, the short story "For the Benefit of Mankind", which won the Galaxy Award in 2005.

== Reception ==
=== Reviews ===
Publishers Weekly wrote, that "although greatly varied in theme and approach, all of these stories impress with their visionary sweep and scope." Furthermore, "the inclusion of three essays on the significance of science fiction to China and its writers underscores the thoughtfulness that Liu put into curating this superb compilation."

Stephanie Chan wrote on Strange Horizons, that "the idea persists that the East is, as a general rule, old, mystical, unknowable. But this is exactly the set of assumptions that translator and editor Ken Liu warns against". Nonetheless, "the stories live in a cultural context that cannot be ignored" and "seem to occupy a fascinating space: telling tales through a perspective that is uniquely Chinese as well as through a Chinese interpretation of Western stories." In summary, the anthology "is strewn with familiar landmarks and ideas in a landscape that is notably distinct" and "are largely successful and often offer an interesting take on familiar ideas and motifs."

Kirkus Reviews wrote, that the stories "represent the best in both science fiction and works in translation, detailing situations that appear alien on the surface but deftly reframe contemporary issues to give readers a new view of familiar human experiences." In summary, it is a "phenomenal anthology of short speculative fiction."

=== Awards ===
"Folding Beijing" won the Hugo Award for Best Novelette in 2016.

== See also ==
- Broken Stars and Sinopticon, other anthologies of Chinese science fiction
