= Regina Kanyu Wang =

Chinese-Canadian author

Regina Kanyu Wang (王侃瑜)
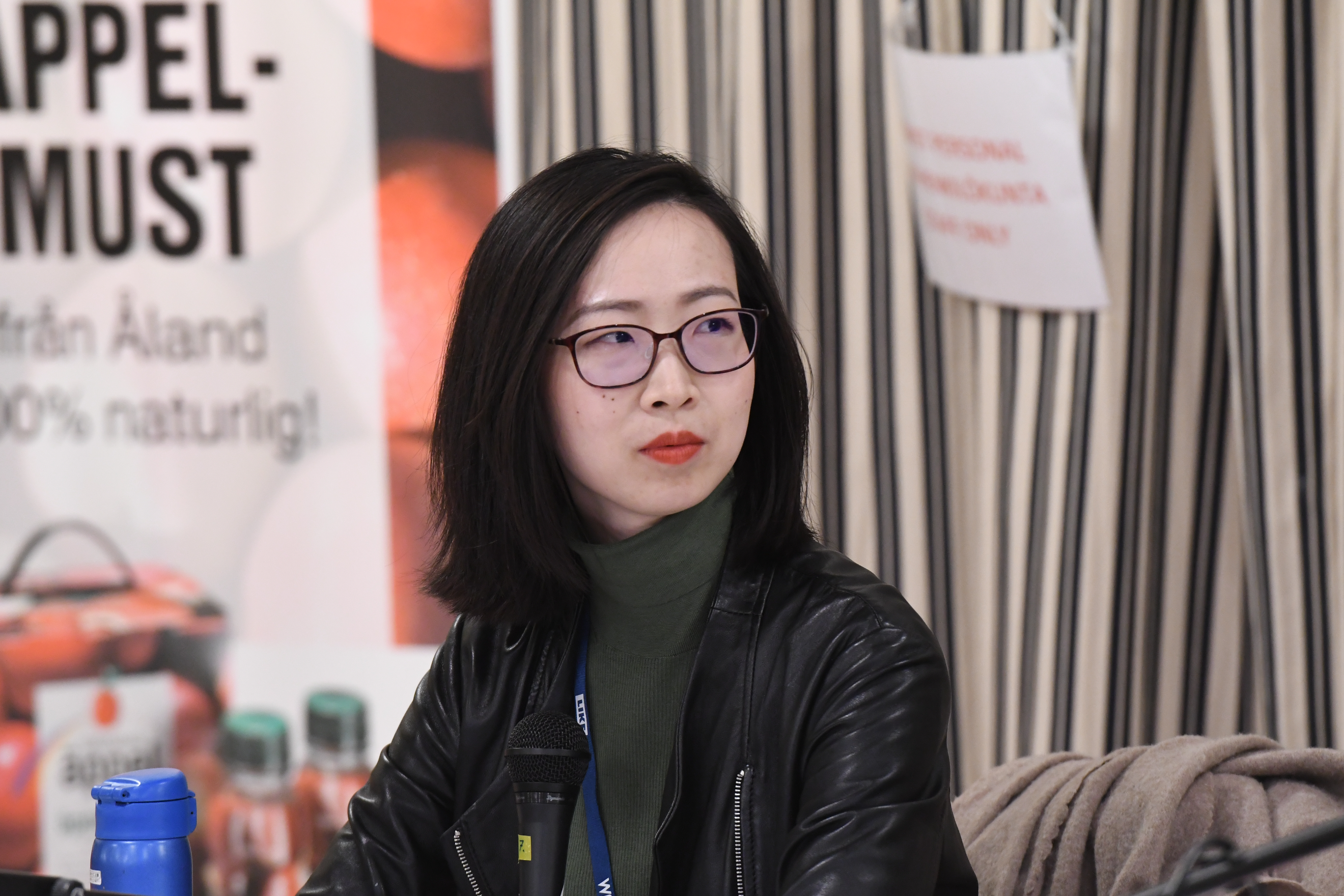
- Wang in 2019
- Born: Shanghai
- Education: University of Oslo
- Occupation: Writer
- Writing career
- Period: 2015–present
- Genre: Speculative fiction

Regina Kanyu Wang is a Chinese writer of speculative fiction and essays on the genre. Her work was first published in 2015, and she immediately began earning acclaim in the form of a number of national awards. In 2023, she was nominated for two Hugo Awards, one for her work the prior year on the fanzine Journey Planet, and one for her 2022 short story 火星上的祝融 ("Zhurong on Mars"). She writes in both Chinese and English.

== Biography ==
Wang, from Shanghai, is currently completing her Ph.D. at the University of Oslo, focusing on women writers of Chinese science fiction. Her hobbies include the physical sports of krav maga, kali, boxing and yoga; she also enjoys cooking and baking.

== Writing career ==
Wang catapulted to national Chinese prominence when she was awarded separate Xingyun Awards (the Chinese equivalent of the Nebula Award) for her fan work and for being a Best New Writer. After receiving a host of national awards in subsequent years, she was nominated for two Hugo Awards in 2023—again for both fan and literary works. Her English-language historical work on Chinese SF provide context to the recent upsurge in production, acceptance, and recognition of Chinese SF authors on the world scene.

In addition to her writing work, Wang has also edited two anthologies of translated Chinese science fiction and fantasy. For The Way Spring Arrives and Other Stories, the stories of which are entirely by women and non-binary authors, Wang made the editorial choice to integrate fandom essays throughout the anthology to provide a contextual foundation for the fiction.

Wang lists as her top five influential/favorite authors Wang Anyi, Ursula K. Le Guin, Ken Liu, Xia Jia, and Chen Qiufan.

== Bibliography ==
Anthologies

- The Way Spring Arrives and Other Stories (2022) with Yu Chen
- New Voices in Chinese Science Fiction (2022) with Neil Clarke and Xia Jia

Short Fiction

- 重返弥安 (2015), translated: Back to Myan (2017) and Întoarcerea pe Myan [Romanian] (2020)
- 云雾 (2015) translated: Nuvole e nebbia [Italian] (2019)
- 消防员 (2016) translated: Il vigile del fuoco [Italian] (2019)
- 脑匣 (2018) translated: The Brain Box (2019), ブレインボックス [Japanese] (2020), Brainbox [German] (2020), Мозговой ящик [Russian] (2020), La caja cerebral [Spanish] (2020)
- The Gift (2018)
- 语膜 (2019) translated: The Language Sheath (2020)
- The Story of Dăo (2019)
- The Winter Garden (2021)
- The Tide of Moon City (2021)
- 火星上的祝融 or "Zhurong on Mars" (2022)

Collections

- Of Cloud and Mist 2.2
- The Seafood Restaurant

== Awards ==
- Hugo Award for Best Short Story for "Zhurong on Mars" in Frontiers (2023) (finalist)
- Hugo Award for Best Fanzine for her work on Journey Planet (2023) (finalist)
- Annual Short Story Award of Shanghai Writers' Association for "The Language Sheath" (2019)
- Xingyun Global Chinese SF Silver Award for Best Novella "Of Cloud and Mist" (2016)
- Xingyun Global Chinese SF Silver Award for Best New Writer (2016)
- Xingyun Global Chinese SF Silver Award Shortlist Award for Best Work for Potential Movie Adaption "Mechanical Squirrel" (2016)
- Xingyun Global Chinese SF Gold Award for Best Movie Script "Of Cloud and Mist", co-authored with Anna Wu (2015)
- Xingyun Global Chinese SF Silver Award for Best New Writer (2015)
- Xingyun Global Chinese SF Silver Award for Best Fan (2015)
- SF Comet - International Science Fiction Short Story Competition Winner "Back to Myan" (2015)
- Xingyun Global Chinese SF Silver Award for Best Fan (2014)
