= Science Fiction & Fantasy Translation Awards =

Literary award, 2011–2013

The Science Fiction & Fantasy Translation Awards was a literary award for science fiction and fantasy works translated into English. The first award was presented in 2011 for works published in 2010. Two awards were given, one for long form (40,000 words) and one for short form. Both the author and translator receive a trophy and a cash prize of US$350. The award was supported a number of ways including direct donations from the public, the Speculative Literature Foundation, prominent academics in particular staff at the University of California, Riverside (UCR), home of the Eaton Collection, one of the world’s largest collections of science fiction and fantasy literature. The last award was for 2013, and the award officially closed in October 2014.

== Nominees and winners ==
Blue Ribbon = winner

=== 2011 ===
The finalists were announced May 24, 2011. The winning works were announced at the 2011 Eurocon in Stockholm on the weekend of June 17–19.

Long Form Award

- The Golden Age, Michal Ajvaz, translated by Andrew Oakland (Dalkey Archive Press). Original publication in Czech as Zlatý Věk (2001).
- The Ice Company, Georges Jean Arnaud, translated by Jean-Marc Lofficier and Randy Lofficier (Black Coat Press). Original publication in French as La Compagnie des Glaces (1980).
- A Life on Paper: Stories, Georges-Olivier Châteaureynaud, translated by Edward Gauvin (Small Beer Press). Original publication in French (1976–2005).
- Four Stories till the End, Zoran Živković, translated by Alice Copple-Tošić (Kurodahan Press). Original publication in Serbian as Četiri priče do kraja (2004).

Short Form Award

- "Wagtail", Marketta Niemelä, translated by Liisa Rantalaiho (Usva International 2010, ed. Anne Leinonen). Original publication in Finnish as "Västäräkki" (Usva (The Mist), 2008).
- "Elegy for a Young Elk", Hannu Rajaniemi, translated by Hannu Rajaniemi (Subterranean Online, Spring 2010). Original publication in Finnish (Portti, 2007).
- "Bear's Bride", Johanna Sinisalo, translated by Liisa Rantalaiho (The Beastly Bride: Tales of the Animal People, eds. Ellen Datlow and Terri Windling, Viking). Original publication in Finnish as "Metsän tuttu" (Aikakone (Time Machine), 3/1991).
- "Midnight Encounters", Hirai Teiichi, translated by Brian Watson (Kaiki: Uncanny Tales from Japan, Vol. 2, Kurodahan Press). Original publication in Japanese (1960).

Special Award

- Brian Stableford, in recognition of the excellence of his translation work.

=== 2012 ===
The finalists were announced May 20, 2012.

Long Form Award

- Good Luck, Yukikaze, Chohei Kambayashi, translated from the Japanese by Neil Nadelman (Haikasoru)
- Utopia, Ahmed Khaled Towfik, translated from the Arabic by Chip Rossetti (Bloomsbury Qatar)
- The Dragon Arcana, Pierre Pevel, translated from the French by Tom Clegg (Gollancz)
- Midnight Palace, Carlos Ruiz Zafón, translated from the Spanish by Lucia Graves (Little, Brown & Company)
- Zero, Huang Fan, translated from the Chinese by John Balcom (Columbia University Press)

Short Form Award

- "The Fish of Lijiang", Chen Qiufan, translated from the Chinese by Ken Liu (Clarkesworld #59, August 2011)
- "Spellmaker", Andrzej Sapkowski, translated from the Polish by Michael Kandel (A Polish Book of Monsters, Michael Kandel, PIASA Books)
- "Paradiso", Georges-Olivier Chateaureynaud, translated from the French by Edward Gauvin (Liquid Imagination #9, Summer 2011)
- "The Boy Who Cast No Shadow", Thomas Olde Heuvelt, translated from the Dutch by Laura Vroomen (PS Publishing)
- "The Short Arm of History", Kenneth Krabat, translated from the Danish by Niels Dalgaard (Sky City: New Science Fiction Stories by Danish Authors, Carl-Eddy Skovgaard ed., Science Fiction Cirklen)
- "The Green Jacket", Gudrun Östergaard, translated from the Danish by the author and Lea Thume (Sky City: New Science Fiction Stories by Danish Authors, Carl-Eddy Skovgaard ed., Science Fiction Cirklen)
- "Stanlemian", Wojciech Orliński, translated from the Polish by Danusia Stok (Lemistry, Comma Press)

=== 2013 ===
The finalists were announced at Liburnicon 2013, held in Opatija, Croatia, over August 23–25.

Long Form Award

- Atlas: The Archaeology of an Imaginary City by Kai-cheung Dung, translated from the Chinese by Anders Hansson, Bonnie S. McDougall, and the author (Columbia University Press)
- Belka, Why Don’t You Bark? by Hideo Furukawa, translated from the Japanese by Michael Emmerich (Haikasoru)
- Kaytek the Wizard by Janusz Korczak, translated from the Polish by Antonia Lloyd-Jones (Penlight)
- Roadside Picnic by Arkady and Boris Strugatsky, translated from the Russian by Olena Bormashenko (Chicago Review Press)

Short Form Award

- "Augusta Prima" by Karin Tidbeck translated from the Swedish by the author (Jagannath: Stories, Cheeky Frawg)
- "Every Time We Say Goodbye" by Zoran Vlahović, translated from the Croatian by Tatjana Jambrišak, Goran Konvićni, and the author (Kontakt: An Anthology of Croatian SF, Darko Macan and Tatjana Jambrišak, editors, SFera)
- "A Hundred Ghosts Parade Tonight" by Xia Jia, translated from the Chinese by Ken Liu (Clarkesworld #65)
- "A Single Year" by Csilla Kleinheincz, translated from the Hungarian by the author (The Apex Book of World SF #2, Lavie Tidhar, editor, Apex Book Company)

=== 2014 ===
On May 15, 2014, SF&FT announced that "the Board of Directors of the SF&FT Awards is currently considering whether we will be able to present Awards this year". On October 30, 2014, a press release announced the award was "closing down".
