= The Year of the Rat (short story) =

2006 short story by Chen Qiufan

- Short story by Chen Qiufan
- Country: China
- Language: Chinese
- Genre: Science fiction

Publication
- Published in: Science Fiction World and Clarkesworld
- Publication type: Periodical
- Media type: Print
- Publication date: May 2006 and August 2011

"The Year of the Rat" (Chinese: 鼠年; pinyin: shǔnián) is a science-fiction short story by Chinese writer Chen Qiufan, first published in Chinese in Science Fiction World in May 2006 and in English in Clarkesworld in August 2011. The short story also appeared in the anthologies A Hint of the Alien: The Year’s Best Weird Fiction, Volume One, edited by Michael Kelly and Laird Barron, in 2014 as well as Invisible Planets, edited by Ken Liu, in 2016.

== Plot ==
Meng Xian, nicknamed Pea, is declared dead by the protagonist, who then recalls the story from the day they first met: An invasion of genetically engineered neorats, originally intended to be sold on markets, forces the military to participate in hunting and exterminating them. Pea and the protagonist both enlist at a mobilization meeting at their university, where they sit next to each other. Although the missions and their Drill Instructor are hard on them, both quickly become friends and the protagonist even shares neorat tails with a clumsy Pea, which have to be handed in to be counted for chances for better employment after service. Male neorats are now also getting pregnant as nature tries to bypass the artificially created ratio of nine male neorats to one female neorat intended to curb reproduction. Additionally, the neorats seem to get more intelligent quickly. On Pea's birthday, the Drill Instructor becomes more gentle and asks for a birthday wish to which Pea replies to want everybody to go home soon to see their parents again. Pea also concludes a previously unfinished sentence for the protagonist, claiming that life is like a dream.

After Pea's death, the protagonist's platoon pursue a large pack of rats near the border of their jurisdiction. Black Cannon, a bloodthirsty soldier who is also implied as having pushed Pea to his death, leads the battle. The rats show an unusual set of abilities, including the capacity to induce hallucinations. The protagonist gets into a fight with an unusually large rat, which he eventually recognize as Black Cannon. Suddenly the protagonist falls unconscious and later awakens with memories of a firing gun. Meanwhile millions of neorats, now able to walk like humans, have begun a migration leading them through the ocean. Although the protagonist first believes the war to be lost, the Drill Instructor claims that an unknown phenomenon, probably built in by the same people who orchestrated the neorat's escape, causes them to vanish once their purpose is fulfilled. Indeed, the neorat's survival instincts have taken over in the ocean and they begin to attack each other. Seeing this, the protagonist is left thinking about the similarities between humans and neorats, like them only being able to follow little steps of a plan they couldn't know or every sacrifice seeming worth it once business is concluded. Now in peace, the protagonist bids farewell to a foe that never existed.

== Background ==
The rat is traditionally the first animal in the Chinese zodiac cycle of twelve animals. When the short story was published, the last year of the rat had been 2008.

In 2015, Ken Liu, who translated his short story for Invisible Planets, conducted an interview with Chen, and asked about how his stories like "The Year of the Rat" and others "tend to be read in the West as political metaphors about contemporary China". Chen responded:

I’ve never tried to intentionally emphasize political metaphors in my work. I write about aspects of life in China I observe, feel, and experience—some of which are good and some of which are not so good. I’m often surprised by how critics can read deeper meaning into my stories that I didn’t think of.

In particular for "The Year of the Rat", Chen added that "many college students posted on the Web saying that they considered this my best work to date because it resonated with them by expressing the helplessness and confusion concerning the future they felt".

== Reviews ==
Theresa Delucci wrote for the Reactor Magazine, that the short story features an "apocalypse abound", which "plays on a grand scale". Sam Tomaino wrote for sfrevu.com, that the short story is an "imaginative tale with some images you will never forget".

== See also ==
- The Fish of Lijiang (2006) and The Flower of Shazui (2011), other science-fiction short stories by Chen Qiufan in Invisible Planets
