= Cheng Jingbo =

Chinese science fiction writer

Cheng Jingbo (Chinese: 程婧波; pinyin: Chéng Jìngbō, born 1983 in the People's Republic of China) is a Chinese science fiction writer, translator, editor and screenwriter. Two of her works won the Galaxy Award and she became the first female writer to also win the Nebula Award. One of her short stories is included in the english anthology Broken Stars. Fellow Chinese science fiction writer Liu Cixin (most well-known outside China for the Hugo Award winning The Three-Body Problem) praised her works as "a brand-new experience at the border of science fiction and fantasy".

== Life ==
Cheng Jingbo has a Master's degree in Communication from Sichuan University. She currently lives in Chengdu in Sichuan Province and works for the Sichuan Juvenile and Children's Publishing House. She also served as the Deputy Secretary-General of the Science and Literature Committee of the China Popular Science Writers Association as well as 5th and 6th sessions of the Sichuan Science Popularization Writers Association, respectively.

== Bibliography ==
- 西天, xītiān ["Western Sky"], nominated for the Galaxy Award in 2003.
- Grave of the Fireflies (萤火虫之墓, yínghuǒchóng zhī mù), published in the Clarkesworld Magazine in 2014 and in the anthology Invisible Planets in 2016.
- Under a Dangling Sky (倒悬的天空, dàoxuán de tiānkōng), published in December 2004 and in the anthology Broken Stars in April 2020, translated by Ken Liu
- 去他的时间尽头, qù tā de shíjiān jìntóu ["Fuck the end of time"], winner of the Galaxy Award in 2021
- 她：中国女性科幻作家经典作品集, tā: zhōngguó nǚxìng kēhuàn zuòjiā jīngdiǎn zuòpǐn jí ["She: A collection of classical works by female chinese science fiction authors"], winner of the Galaxy Award in 2023
- Pasture White Stags, winner of the Gold Award for Best Short Story at the 15th Nebula Awards hosted in Chengdu.
