= Vagabonds (Hao Jingfang book) =

Book by Hao Jingfang

Vagabonds is a book by Hao Jingfang. It was positively reviewed by a number of sources.
