= Folding Beijing =

Novelette by Hao Jingfang

- 2016 edition
- Author: Hao Jingfang
- Original title: 北京折叠
- Translator: Ken Liu
- Language: Chinese
- Genre: Chinese science fiction
- Publication date: 2012
- Publication place: China

Folding Beijing
- Simplified Chinese: 北京折叠
- Traditional Chinese: 北京折疊
Transcriptions
Standard Mandarin
- Hanyu Pinyin: Běijīng zhédié

Folding Beijing (simplified Chinese: 北京折叠; traditional Chinese: 北京折疊; lit. 'Beijing Folds') is a science fiction novelette by the Chinese writer Hao Jingfang.

This work was originally posted on newsmth.net, the BBS of Tsinghua University, in December 2012. It took the author around 1 month to plan, and 3 days to write. It was later published in two Chinese magazines in 2014.

An English translation by Ken Liu was published in 2015 on Uncanny Magazine. It won the 2016 Hugo Award for Best Novelette.

In April 2017, Hao announced that Folding Beijing was to be adapted into a movie titled Folding City, produced by Chinese film production company Wanda Media and directed by Josh Kim. As of 2026, it is still in development.

== Plot ==
In an unspecified future, Beijing within the 6th Ring Road is divided by three classes physically, sharing the same earth surface in each 48 hour cycle: The first governing class with 5 million population occupy the space for 24 hours from 6 am to 6 am, after which the earth's surface will be turned upside-down, to move the second and third class up. The second class has 25 million middle-class people, and will enjoy 16 hours from 6 am to 10 pm. Then, the building of the second class will fold and retract while the high buildings of the third class unfold and rise, which hosts 50 million lower class people, who can be awake for 8 hours till 6 am. When each class is turned down or folded, the residents there would be put into sleep. Travelling between classes is tightly controlled and violators would be put into jail.

Lao Dao, a waste processing worker of the third class, finds a message from Qin Tian, a graduate student in the second class. Qin offers Lao Dao money, if he can delivery a love letter to Yi Yan, Qin's lover in the first class. To make enough money for his adopted daughter Tangtang's kindergarten tuition, Lao Dao accepts this job. After he manages to arrive the first class, he finds that Yi Yan is actually a married woman, who offers Lao Dao more money to hide this fact from Qin. On the way back, Lao Dao is captured due to the lack of an identification of the first class, but rescued by Ge, a security official who was born in the third class. Lao Dao accidentally finds that the whole waste processing industry, the main economic pillar of the third world, can be easily replaced by technology – and it is only kept in order to provide jobs for those third class people. After dropping the response letter to Qin in the second class, Lao Dao comes back to the third class with newly made money, and continues his life.
