= Shuang Chimu =

Shuang Chimu (Chinese: 双翅目; pinyin: Shuāng Chìmù, born 1987) is a Chinese science fiction writer.

== Life ==
Shuang Chimu has a doctorate in philosophy from Renmin University of China.

== Bibliography ==
- 回音壁, huíyīn bì ["Music Bar"], published in 2015.
- 我的家人和其他进化中的动物们, wǒ de jiārén hé qítā jìnhuà zhōng de dòngwùmen ["My family and Other Evolving Animals"], published in 2019.
- 盆儿鬼与提箱人, pén er guǐ yǔ tíxiāng rén, published in the anthology 猞猁学派, shē lì xuépài) in January 2020, published in German in the anthology Quantenträume ["Quantum Dreams"] in September 2020.
- 超生游击队, chāoshēng yóují duì ["Superbionic Guerilla"], published in 2020.
