= Zheng Wenguang =

Chinese writer

- 郑文光
- Born: 9 April 1929; Vietnam
- Died: June 17, 2003 (aged 74)
- Occupation: science fiction writer

Zheng Wenguang (Chinese: 郑文光; pinyin: Zhèng Wén Guāng, 9 April 1929 - 17 June 2003) was a Chinese science fiction writer.

Zheng was born in Vietnam, but moved to China in 1947. He was first published in 1954 and continued to write until a stroke in 1983. People's Daily stated in his obituary that he had to quit writing science fiction during the Cultural Revolution due to official pressure.

He also was a research fellow at the Beijing Astronomical Observatory. In the West he might be best known for the story "The Mirror Image of the Earth", which was reprinted in at least two anthologies.

== See also ==
- Science fiction in China
