= The Book of Shanghai =

2020 anthology of stories about Shanghai

The Book of Shanghai is an anthology of ten stories from various Chinese writers, edited by Dai Congrong and Jin Li as well as published on 14 September 2020. It is the fourteenth book of the Reading the City series, focused on stories from and about a certain city, in this case Shanghai in China.

== Stories ==
- Ah Fang's Lamp by Wang Anyi, translated by Helen Wang
- Snow by Chen Danyan, translated by Paul Harris
- Bengal Tiger by Xia Shang, translated by Lee Anderson
- Woman Dancing under Stars by Teng Xiaolan, translated by Yu Yan Chen
- The Novelist in the Attic by Shen Dacheng, translated by Jack Hargreaves
- The Story of Ah-Ming by Wang Zhanghei, translated by Christopher MacDonald
- The Lost by Fu Yuehui, translated by Carson Ramsdell
- Transparency by Xiao Bai, translated by Katherine Tse
- Suzhou River by Cai Jun, translated by Frances Nichol
- State of Trance by Chen Qiufan, translated by Josh Stenberg

== Background ==
The University of Manchester, whose Confucius Institute initiated the anthology, wrote that it is a "literary exploration of one of the world’s biggest cities" and that the characters are "defined by their determination – a refusal to lose themselves in a city that might otherwise leave them anonymous, disconnected or alone." Karen Wang, director of the Confucius Institute, added to hope that the anthology "allows an insight into the present concerns and thoughts of local residents."

== Reviews ==
Susan Blumberg-Kason wrote for the Asian Review of Books, that "these stories all follow a common theme, whether intentional or not, of loneliness and isolation." Discussing "Woman Dancing under Stars" and "The Story of Ah-Ming", calling the latter a "touching story," she remarks that it "is especially serious for the elderly, particularly in a dense city like Shanghai." She adds that "many of the other stories feature younger characters, but their loneliness is no less palpable," calling "The Lost" the "most memorable" among them. In conclusion, she wrote that "it is hard to find anyone who really knows Shanghai. This collection is a start."

Mark wrote for the University of Exeter, that the anthology features an "array of memorable characters" navigating "diverse" situations, noting it "highlight[s] the deep rift between human experience and the advance of technology" and therefore "loneliness is a recurring theme." In particular, he writes that "The Novelist in the Attic" has "a touch of the surreal, mirroring the other-worldly sense of the murky labyrinthine streets," just "like other stories in the collection." In summary, "the city comes alive (in sometimes unnerving ways) in these tales" and is "teeming with profound reflections, offbeat humour and unsettling observations."
