= Liu Yang (writer) =

Chinese science fiction writer (born 1986)

Liu Yang (Chinese: 刘洋; pinyin: Liú Yáng, born 1986 in Sichuan Province, People's Republic of China) is a Chinese science fiction writer and professor at Xi’an University of Technology.

== Life ==
Liu Yang graduated with a Bachelor of Science in Physics from Beijing Normal University and then obtained a doctorate there from 2011 to 2016, which dealt with condensed matter physics. He began writing while waiting for the computation of numerical results. His first short story "Shizhen" (时振) was published in 2012. His first novel "Orphans of Mars" (火星孤儿) was published in August 2015. In the winter semester of 2018, Liu Yang joined the Center for Humanities and Sciences of the Southern University of Science and Technology in Shenzhen to devote time to lecture and research the writing of science fiction. He claimed that the most important aspect of an extraordinary science fiction novel is its core setting to be attractive. ("一部杰出的科幻小说，最重要的是其核心设定要足够吸引人。")

== Bibliography ==
- Shizhen (short story), 时振
- The Ladder of Paradise, winner of the Silver Award for Best Novella at the 9th Chinese Nebula Awards hosted in Chongqing.
- Orphans of Mars (novel), 火星孤儿, winner of the Silver Award for Best Novel at the 10th Nebula Awards.
- The Opposite and the Adjacent, first published in Chinese in Micro SF in 2013, published in English with translation by Nick Stember in the Clarkesworld Magazine #120 in September 2016.
- 机器女佣, jīqì nǚ yōng ["Robot Maid"], first published in 2014, published in German in the anthology Quantenträume ["Quantum Dreams"] in 2020.
- A Perfect Doomsday (short story collection), 完美末日, published in September 2015.
- Honeycomb (short story collection), 蜂巢, published in September 2017.
- Lumenfabulatur, published in Life Beyond Us: An Original Anthology of SF Stories and Science Essays in January 2023
- City in the Well, winner of the Gold Award for Best Novel at the 15th Nebula Awards hosted in Chengdu.
