= Tong Enzheng =

- 童恩正
- Born: 1935
- Died: 1997 (aged 61–62)
- Occupations: Archaeologist, novelist
- Notable work: Cultural Anthropology; New Journey to the West; Death Ray on a Coral Island
- Awards: China's best short story 1978 Death Ray on a Coral Island

Tong Enzheng (Chinese: 童恩正; 1935 – April 20, 1997) was a prominent Chinese archaeologist, historian, designer, and science fiction author.

== Career ==
Tong authored the textbook Cultural Anthropology and specialized in early southwest China. He also was involved in redesigning the Sichuan University Museum. He also became noted for his criticism of the influence of Lewis H. Morgan on Chinese anthropology. Tong also led the "Southern Silk Road Project", pursuing the study of links between ancient Southeast Asia and China. Not many of Tong's publications in Chinese have been translated. In English, one of his most widely cited articles is a review of Chinese archaeology under socialism.

In science fiction he wrote the satirical New Journey to the West, and the short story Death Ray on a Coral Island. This won an award for "China's best short story" in 1978 and was later adapted to film. Both his science fiction writings as well as his archaeological and historical scholarly writings were reprinted in a multi-volume set issued in 1998 from Chongqing Publishing House (Tong Enzheng wenji, 3 volumes, 1998, ISBN 978-7-5366-3871-6).

He died in the US after fleeing China following the Government crackdown on the protests at Tiananmen Square. At the time, he was a visiting scholar at Wesleyan University, which has instituted a lecture series in his name, an Enzheng Tong Archaeology Library located at its Mansfield Freeman Center for East Asian Studies.
