= The Flower of Shazui =

2012 short story by Chen Qiufan

- Short story by Chen Qiufan
- Country: China
- Language: Chinese
- Genre: Science fiction

Publication
- Published in: ZUI Ink-Minority Report/Interzone
- Publication type: Periodical
- Media type: Print
- Publication date: November/December 2012

"The Flower of Shazui" (Chinese: 沙嘴之花; pinyin: Shāzuǐ zhī huā) is a science-fiction short story by Chinese writer Chen Qiufan, first published in Chinese in ZUI Ink-Minority Report in 2012, first published in English in Interzone in November/December 2012. The short story also appeared in the anthology Invisible Planets in 2016.

== Plot ==
Shazui, a former fishing village located between the large cities of Hong Kong and Shenzhen, is going through a rapid change from rural to industrial due to the "speed of the special economic zone". By now, it is filled with skyscrapers obstructing the view of the sky. In Shazui, the protagonist sells cracked augmented-reality software and body films, which is a liquid applied to the skin to show electrical activity of nerves and muscles beneath. Although body film has been developed to treat disease, people prefer it for sex and gangsters also use it for interrogations. Big Sister Shen, the protagonist's landlord, works as a shaman and besides herbs also uses the technology of augmented reality for her rituals. In her shop, the prostitute Snow Lotus often visits and the protagonist eventually falls in love with her. Snow Lotus is married, but her husband East is abusive. He often travels between Hong Kong and Shenzhen with smuggled digital devices and occasionally takes Snow Lotus with him to please his clients. By helping with her body film in Big Sister Shen's store, the protagonist and Snow Lotus grow closer. When Snow Lotus gets pregnant by East and tells Big Sister Shen, the protagonist wants to help her escape the abusive relationship with East. During the confrontation, Snow Lotus tells him about her pregnancy and then stabs him with a knife. While she breaks down in desperation, East's blood spills out like a field of red flowers. Seeing this, the protagonist thinks of Big Sister Shen's herbs and how death is in fact the best placebo.

== Reception ==
=== Reviews ===
Stephanie Chan wrote for Strange Horizons, that the short story "contains a noir-ish element that isn’t wholly successful". She thinks that "there is evocative imagery that keeps the story fresh", but might be "a touch too derivative". Sam Tomaino wrote on sfrevu.com, that "the science fictional element is light" and concerns a "negative view of a future society".

Frederike Schneider-Vielsäcker from the Free University of Berlin wrote an essay for the Science Fiction Research Association (SFRA) to "demonstrate the existing tensions between the grand narrative of the “China Dream” and Chen’s alternative". Shenzhen functions as the prime example of its realization since it "is a symbol of China’s rise", while Chen's story "does not present a typical success story as dreams turn out to be dangerous illusions". It shifts the focus to "depict[s] the losers of China’s rapid development", for which the dream ends up a "placebo for social happiness".

=== Awards ===
"The Flower of Shazui" was nominated for the Best Short Form Award for the 2013 Science Fiction & Fantasy Translation Awards.

== See also ==
- The Fish of Lijiang (2006) and The Year of the Rat (2009), other science-fiction short stories by Chen Qiufan in Invisible Planets
