= Fei Dao =

Chinese writer

Jia Liyuan (Chinese: 贾立; pinyin: Jiǎ Lìyuán; born 1983 in Chifeng), commonly known by the pseudonym Fei Dao (Chinese: 飞氘; pinyin: Fēi Dāo), is a Chinese science fiction and fantasy writer, as well as a professor for literature at Tsinghua University in Beijing.

After first studying engineering at the Faculty for Environment of the Beijing Normal University, Fei Dao switched to the Faculty of Liberal Arts of the Beijing Normal University from September 2007 until July 2010 and gained a Master in literature. From September 2010 to July 2015, he further studied at the Institute of the Chinese Language at the Faculty of Humanities at the Tsinghua University in Beijing and gained a doctorate in literature. Afterward he returned to the Beijing Normal University to research and later returned to the Tsinghua University in Beijing to lecture. In 2017, he offered a course about writing science fiction.

Fei Dao began publishing science fiction and fantasy in 2003. His style is said to resemble Italo Calvino, and he is part of the World Culture of Authors founded by Guo Jingming.

== Bibliography ==
- War of the Gods, first published in 2019.
- A Story of the End of the World, first published in 2006.
- The Demon's Head, first published in 2011.
- Legend of the Giant (short story), first published in 2011, published in the Clarkesworld Magazine in 2021.
- The Butterfly Effect, first published in 2011.
- The Robot Who Liked to Tell Tales (爱吹牛的机器人, ài chuīniú de jīqìrén) [literally: "The Robot Who Liked to Show Off"], first published in 2014, published in the anthology Broken Stars in April 2020.
- 讲故事的机器人, jiǎng gùshì de jīqìrén ["The Robot Who Liked to Tell Tales"], first published in 2015, published in German in the anthology Quantenträume ["Quantum Dreams"] in September 2020.
- Science Fiction: Embarrassing No More (essay), first published in 2019, published in the anthology Broken Stars in 2020.
