= Tiannan =

1982 establishments in China

Chutzpah Magazine
- Frequency: Quarterly
- Founded: 1982
- Final issue: 2014
- Country: China
- Based in: Beijing
- Website: chutzpahmagazine.com.cn
- ISSN: 1004-6399

Tiannan or Chutzpah Magazine (Chinese: 天南), also known as Chutzpah! or Chutzpah! Magazine, was a Chinese literary magazine, originally founded in 1982 by the[Guangdong Provincial Folk Artists Association (广东省民间文艺家协会) as a folk literature publication. Chutzpah, the English name of Tiannan, comes from the Hebrew word, meaning "unscrupulous" (肆无忌惮).

== History ==
In 2005, it was purchased by the Modern Media Group (现代传播集团) and changed to a book review magazine named Modern Book Reviews, but it did not make it, and its issue had been idle for 5 years.

On April 1, 2011, with Ou Ning as its editor-in-chief, the magazine was officially published and launched. The theme of the publication was The Hometown of Asia (亚细亚的故乡), and focused on the history and reality of rural areas in Asia and the wave of social movements involving intellectuals in rural construction. Since 2011, its English name had been changed to Chutzpah!.

In September 2013, it was restructured from a bimonthly to a quarterly publication. In February 2014, Chutzpah! ceased publication due to business pressure.
