= The Paper Menagerie =

2011 fantasy/magical realism short story by Ken Liu

- Short story by Ken Liu
- Language: English
- Genres: Fantasy; magical realism

Publication
- Published in: F&SF
- Published in English: 2011
- Awards: Hugo Award for Best Short Story; Nebula Award for Best Short Story; World Fantasy Award-Short Fiction

"The Paper Menagerie" is a 2011 fantasy/magical realism short story by Ken Liu. It was first published in The Magazine of Fantasy & Science Fiction. It was later published in the collection The Paper Menagerie and Other Stories.

== Plot summary ==
The story follows Jack, a first-generation American son of a white American father and a Chinese immigrant mail-order bride mother. As a child, Jack is enchanted by his mother's magical ability to make origami paper animals come to life. These paper creatures play with him, comfort him, and become a vivid representation of the intimate bond he shares with his mother, as well as a link to his Chinese heritage.

However, as Jack grows older, he becomes conscious of the differences between his family and the American families around him. Wanting to fit in, he begins to reject his Chinese heritage. He stops speaking Chinese and distances himself from his mother, ashamed of her accented English and traditional ways. The rift between them widens as the years go by.

As an adult, after his mother's death, Jack discovers a letter she wrote to him in Chinese. With help, he translates it and learns about his mother's tragic past during the Cultural Revolution in China, her journey through Hong Kong to America, and her enduring love for him despite his rejection. The story highlights themes of internalized racism and embracing one's identity.

== Reception and awards ==
The story became the first work of fiction to win all of the Nebula, the Hugo and the World Fantasy Awards. The South China Morning Post praised the story. The Jakarta Post called the story a 'masterclass'. The Washington Post called it a 'magnificent, poignant tale'. Mashable praised the story as it 'explores immigration, identity, and culture, with so much heart, joy, and brevity'.

Year	Award	Category	Result	Ref.
2011	Nebula Award	Short Story	Won	
2012	Hugo Award	Short Story	Won	
2012	Locus Award	Short Story	Finalist	
2012	Theodore Sturgeon Award	—	Finalist - 3rd	
2012	World Fantasy Awards	Short Fiction	Won	
2013	Premio Ignotus	Foreign Short Story	Won	
2014	Seiun Award	Translated Short Story	Won	
2016	Grand Prix de l'Imaginaire	Foreign Short Fiction	Won	
