= Zhang Ran (writer) =

Chinese science fiction author (1981- )

Zhang Ran (Chinese: 张冉; pinyin: Zhāng Rǎn, born 12 December 1981 in Taiyuan, Shanxi Province, People's Republic of China) is a Chinese science fiction writer.

== Life ==
Zhang Ran completed a Master in computer science at Beijing Jiaotong University. After working in IT industry for a while, he became a reporter and message analyst at Economic Daily and China Economic Net. During that time, his new comments earned him a China News Award. His stories have furthermore won several golden and silver Nebula Awards as well as three Galaxy Awards for the best novelette. Zhang Ran owns a café and writes in his free time.

== Bibliography ==
- Ether; (以太, yǐtài); published in Science Fiction World in 2012; published in English in the Clarkesworld Magazine in January 2015; winner of the Galaxy Award in 2012. Ether depicts a setting in which disinformation nanobots can control light and sounds waves. To rebel against "the disappearance of revolutionary spirit from the Internet," a "Finger Chatting Society" forms, the members of which communicate by drawing characters on to each other's hands.
- 起风之城, qǐ fēng zhī chéng ["The Windy City"], winner of the Galaxy Award in 2013.
- 大饥之年, dà jī zhī nián ["Year of the Great Famine"], winner of the Galaxy Award in 2014.
- The Snow of Jinyang (晋阳三尺雪, Jìnyáng sān chǐ xuě); published in New Science Fiction in January 2014, published in the anthology Broken Stars in April 2020.
- An Age of Ice; published in Southern Weekly on 10 January 2016; translated in English by Andy Dudak and published in the Clarkesworld Magazine in July 2017.
- Master Zhao: The Tale of an Ordinary Time Traveler; published in the Clarkesworld Magazine in December 2018.
