= Tang Fei (writer) =

Chinese science fiction and fantasy writer

Tang Fei (Chinese: 糖匪) is the pen-name of Chinese science fiction writer Wang Jing. She mainly writes speculative novellas and short stories, and is a member of the Science Fiction and Fantasy Writers of America.

== Career ==
She has written and published nearly 500,000 words since 2005. Her works have been selected in various SF of the Year, Fantasy of the Year and Tibetan SF&F series in China. Since 2013, her stories have been translated into English by Ken Liu and other translators, and published in the UK, the US and Australia, two of which were selected as APEX's Year's Best.

In 2017, Tang Fei's short story collection The Person Who Saw Cetus (看见鲸鱼座的人) was published by Shanghai Literature and Art Publishing House. In 2018, she was invited to Adelaide by the Culture Ministry of Australia as a representative of Chinese writers, to attend the Festival of Literacy. In 2019, her novel The Nameless Feast (无名盛宴) was published by Jiangsu Literature and Art Publishing House. "Many of her stories have a tone touched by Magic Realism, as if the mundane world of modern China is just out of reach behind a veil of romantic allegories," according to John Clute.

== Selected works ==
- 《黄色故事》"Call Girl" Trans by Ken Liu 2013 @ Apex, Apex best of the year reprint, The Year's Best Science Fiction & Fantasy 2014 (Rich Horton)
- 《蒲蒲》"Pepe" Trans by John Chu 2014 @ Clarkesworld, Apex best of the year reprint Vol 4
- 《宇宙哀歌》"A Universal Elegy" Trans by John Chu 2015 @ Clarkesworld
- 《碎星星》"Broken Stars" Trans by Ken Liu 2016 @ SQ
- 《自由之路》"The Path to Freedom", Trans by Christine Ni 2016 @ paper-republic
- 《看见鲸鱼座的人》"The Person Who Saw Cetus" 2017 @ Clarkesworld
- 《世间》"この世" @聴く中国語 2017/Oct
- 《熊貓飼養員》"Panda Breeder", Trans by Tony Huang 2019 @ SmokeLong Quarterly
- A translated collection,"A Collection of Tang Fei's SF", including "Call Girl", "The Person Who Saw Cetus", "The Path to Freedom", "A Universal Elegy", "Broken Star"
