= Huang Fan =

Huang Fan (Chinese:黃凡) is a contemporary Taiwanese writer, born in 1950.

He grew up in a family dependants community, like many people from Mainland China who arrived with Chiang Kai-shek in 1949. His educational background is in engineering. He is now a professional writer.

His fiction is urbane and often experimental in technique.

He had been absent in the literary circle for more than 10 years, only to return in 2003 with the publication of a collection of novels (Chinese: 躁鬱的國家; trans. "The Manic Country"), and other novels.
