= Ma Boyong =

Chinese novelist, columnist and blogger (born 1980)

- 马伯庸
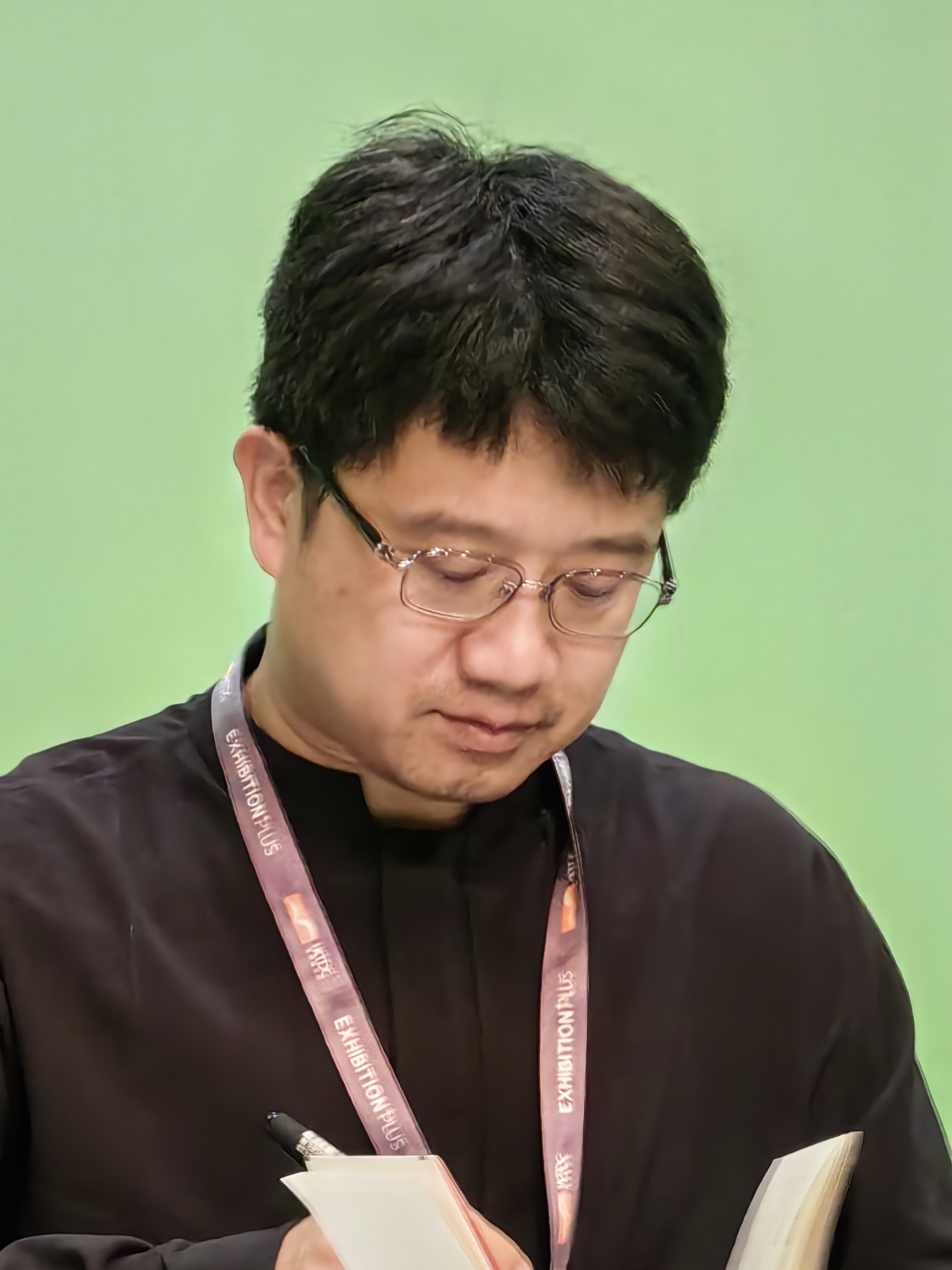
- Ma Boyong at 2023 Hong Kong Book Fair
- Born: Ma Li (马力); 14 November 1980 (age 45); Chifeng, Inner Mongolia, China
- Education: University of Waikato
- Occupations: Novelist, Columnist, Famous Blogger
- Writing career
- Language: Chinese
- Period: 2005–present
- Genres: Science fiction, Fantasy, Detective fiction, Historical fiction, Column
- Notable awards: People's Literature Prize, Zhu Ziqing Essay Awards

Chinese name
- Simplified Chinese: 马伯庸
Transcriptions
Standard Mandarin
- Hanyu Pinyin: mǎ bó yōng

Ma Boyong (born 14 November 1980) is a Chinese novelist, columnist, and playwright. In the year of 2010, he won People's Literature Prize, one of China's most prestigious honors.

== Works ==
=== The City of Silence ===
His short story The City of Silence depicts a state in which surveillance is some omnipresent that most people live in silence and solitude in acquiescence to the control of state-managed listening systems and computers.

It was translated into English by science fiction writer Ken Liu and appeared in the anthology Invisible Planets published by Head of Zeus in November 2016. That translation is truer to the original author's intent than the Chinese version, which was self-censored. Ironically, the theme of that story is censorship; the setting of the Chinese version is a fictional version of New York City, while the English version takes place in a more neutral "Capital of the State", more easily invoking the comparison with China than the author intended.

=== Books series published ===
Name	Publishing house	Date
她死在QQ上	安徽文艺出版社	2006
风起陇西	海洋出版社	2006
笔冢随录	上海文艺出版总社	2007
殷商舰队玛雅征服史	二十一世纪出版社	2007
古董局中局	Phoenix Publishing House	2012
我读书少，你可别骗我	浙江大学出版社	2012
三国配角演义	江苏文艺出版社	2013
古董局中局2：清明上河图之谜	江苏文艺出版社	2013
殷商玛雅征服史	北京联合出版公司	2013
欧罗巴英雄记	九州出版社	2014
古董局中局3：掠宝清单	北京联合出版公司	2015
马伯庸笑翻中国简史	北京联合出版公司	2015
古董局中局4:大结局	北京联合出版公司	2015
文化不苦旅	四川人民出版社	2015
龙与地下铁	湖南文艺出版社	2016
长安十二时辰 上	湖南文艺出版社	2016
长安十二时辰 下	湖南文艺出版社	2017
Lychees of Chang'an	湖南文艺出版社	2021
太白金星有点烦	湖南文艺出版社	2023
