= The Fish of Lijiang =

2009 short story by Chen Qiufan

- Short story by Chen Qiufan
- Country: China
- Language: Chinese
- Genre: Science fiction

Publication
- Published in: Science Fiction World and The Magazine of Fantasy & Science Fiction
- Publication type: Periodical
- Media type: Print
- Publication date: May 2009 and July/August 2013

"The Fish of Lijiang" (simplified Chinese: 丽江的鱼儿们; traditional Chinese: 麗江的魚兒們; pinyin: lìjiāng de yúér men) is a science-fiction short story by Chinese writer Chen Qiufan, first published in Chinese in Science Fiction World in May 2009 and in English in The Magazine of Fantasy & Science Fiction in July/August 2013. The short story also appeared in the anthology Invisible Planets in 2016.

== Plot ==
After approaching a burnout due to an excessive chase of material wealth in cost of personal fulfillment, the protagonist is sent to the city of Lijiang, meaning "city at the beautiful river" in Chinese. Lijiang is in Southern China, close to the border to Myanmar. Since the story is set in the future, most of the natural beauty of the city has disintegrated over time, for example robots are roaming through Lijiang and there are holograms everywhere. Even the sky is artificially kept blue. In the waterways of the city, there are still schools of little red fish swimming against the current. This make the protagonist very happy since at least they've not changed since a previous visit a decade ago and are also a fitting metaphor for life itself. Later the protagonist learns to have been sent there to undergo a procedure stretching the subjective time a person experiences in order to heal from the burnout without needing a long treatment. After returning to the fish, the protagonist stares at them and notices the exact same one separating from the group when getting carried away by the current and then returning. It turns out that the fish have also been replaced by holograms.

== Background ==
Around 2006, Chen was a recent college graduate and working an exhausting real-estate job in Shenzhen, when he visited Lijiang. He directly perceived time as running slower and was delighted by the mountains in the distance as well as the fish in the canals. It made him reflect about people from the city in environments like this and eventually lead to the short story.

In 2015, Ken Liu, who translated his short story for Invisible Planets, conducted an interview with Chen, and asked about how his stories like "The Fish of Lijiang" and others "tend to be read in the West as political metaphors about contemporary China". Chen responded:

I’ve never tried to intentionally emphasize political metaphors in my work. I write about aspects of life in China I observe, feel, and experience—some of which are good and some of which are not so good. I’m often surprised by how critics can read deeper meaning into my stories that I didn’t think of.

== Reception ==
=== Reviews ===
Lois Tilton wrote in the Locus Magazine, that the story is a "familiar dystopian tale about workers burned out in a corporate system" and has an "explicitly Chinese flavor here". It is "reflecting a nation caught in a rapid and ruthless process of modernization".

Dave Truesdale wrote in Tangent Online, that the short story "portrays the ever-widening gap between rich and poor, laborers and the idle rich. Chen "skillfully drops in bits of telling characterization that adds personal depth to the story" so that "social and political observation add another layer". He concludes: "Kudos to Chen for the imaginative core concept and storytelling skill, and to Liu for bringing both alive in translation."

=== Awards ===
"The Fish of Lijiang" received the Best Short Form Award for the 2012 Science Fiction & Fantasy Translation Awards.

== See also ==
- The Year of the Rat (2009) and The Flower of Shazui (2011), other science-fiction short stories by Chen Qiufan in Invisible Planets
