= Hao Jingfang =

Chinese science fiction writer

- 郝景芳
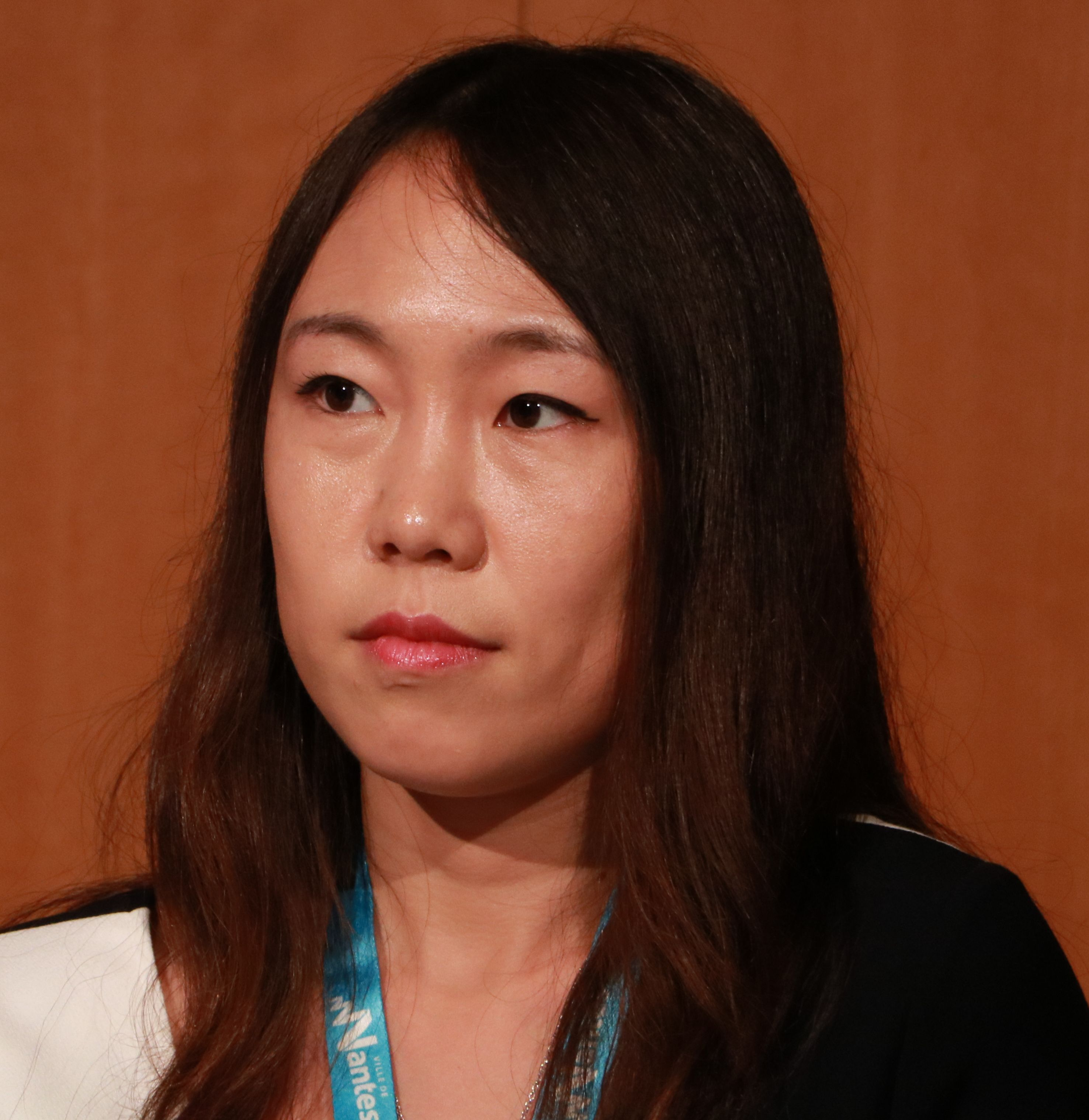
- Hao Jingfang in 2017
- Born: July 27, 1984 (age 42); Tianjin, China
- Education: Tsinghua University
- Occupations: Economy researcher Novelist
- Children: 1, daughter
- Writing career
- Language: Chinese
- Genre: Science fiction
- Notable work: Folding Beijing
- Notable awards: Hugo Award for Best Novelette for Folding Beijing

Hao Jingfang (Chinese: 郝景芳; pinyin: Hǎo Jǐngfāng; born 27 July 1984) is a Chinese science fiction writer. She won the 2016 Hugo Award for Best Novelette for Folding Beijing, translated by Ken Liu.

== Biography ==
Hao Jingfang was born in Tianjin, on 27 July 1984. After high school, she studied, then worked, at Tsinghua University, in the area of physics. After noticing the economic inequality of China, she studied economics in Tsinghua University, obtained a doctoral degree in 2013, and has worked as a researcher at China Development Research Foundation since then.

In 2002, as a high school student, she won the first prize at the 4th national high school "New Concept" writing competition (新概念作文大赛). In 2016, she won the Hugo Award for Best Novelette for her work Folding Beijing. She became the first Chinese woman to win a Hugo Award.

Vagabonds was shortlisted for the 2021 Arthur C. Clarke Award.

In June 2026 Hao sparked heated debate after revealing that "half" of her latest work (namely the final two books in her five-volume children's science fiction series entitled Galaxy Academy) was "written with AI," stating that "readers can't tell which parts."

== Personal life ==
Hao is married and has a daughter.

== Individual works ==
=== Novels ===
- Wandering Maearth 流浪玛厄斯, 2011, translated in German as Wandernde Himmel, 2018. "Maearth" is a Mars-Earth space shuttle
- Return to Charon (回到卡戎), 2012
- Folding Beijing (北京折叠), first published in Chinese in February 2014 in ZUI Found, first published in English in Uncanny Magazine in January–February 2015, later published in the anthology Invisible Planets, ISBN 978-0765384195
  Beijing is divided by three classes physically, which periodically replace each other within the same earth surface in each 48 hour cycle.
- Vagabonds (流浪苍穹). Head of Zeus. 2020 ISBN 978-1982143312.
  Synthesis of two Mandarin Chinese novels, "Wandering Maearth" and "Return to Charon"
  The novel follows the eighteen-year-old Luoying and her friends, who return to their home planet of Mars after five years on Earth.
  A review in Strange Horizons says that "two key themes are the difficulty of understanding another culture from within one’s own, and the difficulty of understanding one’s own culture from within it". It also expresses the opinion that this combination of two original novels downplays "Vagabonds’ philosophical content to match more familiar English-language expectations of space-faring SF."
- Jumpnauts (宇宙跃迁者). Head of Zeus. 2024 ISBN 978-1534422131.
  A "first contact"-type story set in near future in the context of the Earth on the verge of a war between the Pacific League of Nations and the Atlantic Division of Nations.
  The reviewer Chris Kluwe writes that this is the first book of a trilogy.

=== Short stories ===
- The Last Brave Man (最后一个勇敢的人)
  A dystopian consciousness transfer between clones story. Appeared in Spring 2013 magazine of translations from Chinese Pathlight. The title refers to the finale, when the last clone of a politically persecuted man on a run is caught and executed.
- Invisible Planets (看不见的星球), first published in Chinese in New Science Fiction in February–April 2010, first published in English in Lightspeed Magazine in December 2013, later published in the anthology Invisible Planets, ISBN 978-0765384195
  The frame story is the narrator is telling to another person stories about different planets. The reviewer Stephanie Chan asserts that the title is inspired by Italo Calvino's title Invisible Cities.
- "The New Year Train" (过年回家), first published in Chinese in January 2017 in ELLE China, first published in English in the anthology Broken Stars, ISBN 978-1250297662, 2020; German translation: Der Neujahrszug, in the German anthology of Chinese science fiction Zerbrochene Sterne, the counterpart of English anthology Broken Stars, 2020
  A train equipped with a new type of space-time drive disappears for 6 hours but reappears at the destination on time. For the passengers, however, several days have passed on train.
- Where Are You? (Chinese: 你在哪裡; pinyin: Nǐ zài nǎ'er), 2017, translated in German as Wo bist du?" in the anthology Quantenträume, 2020
  An artificial doppelgänger story
- "Qiankun and Alex" (乾坤和亚⼒), first published 2017 in Mirror of Man, later published in the anthology Sinopticon, ISBN 978-1781088524
  A global-scale AI learns by observing how children learn.
