= Chen Qiufan =

Chinese science fiction author

- 陈楸帆
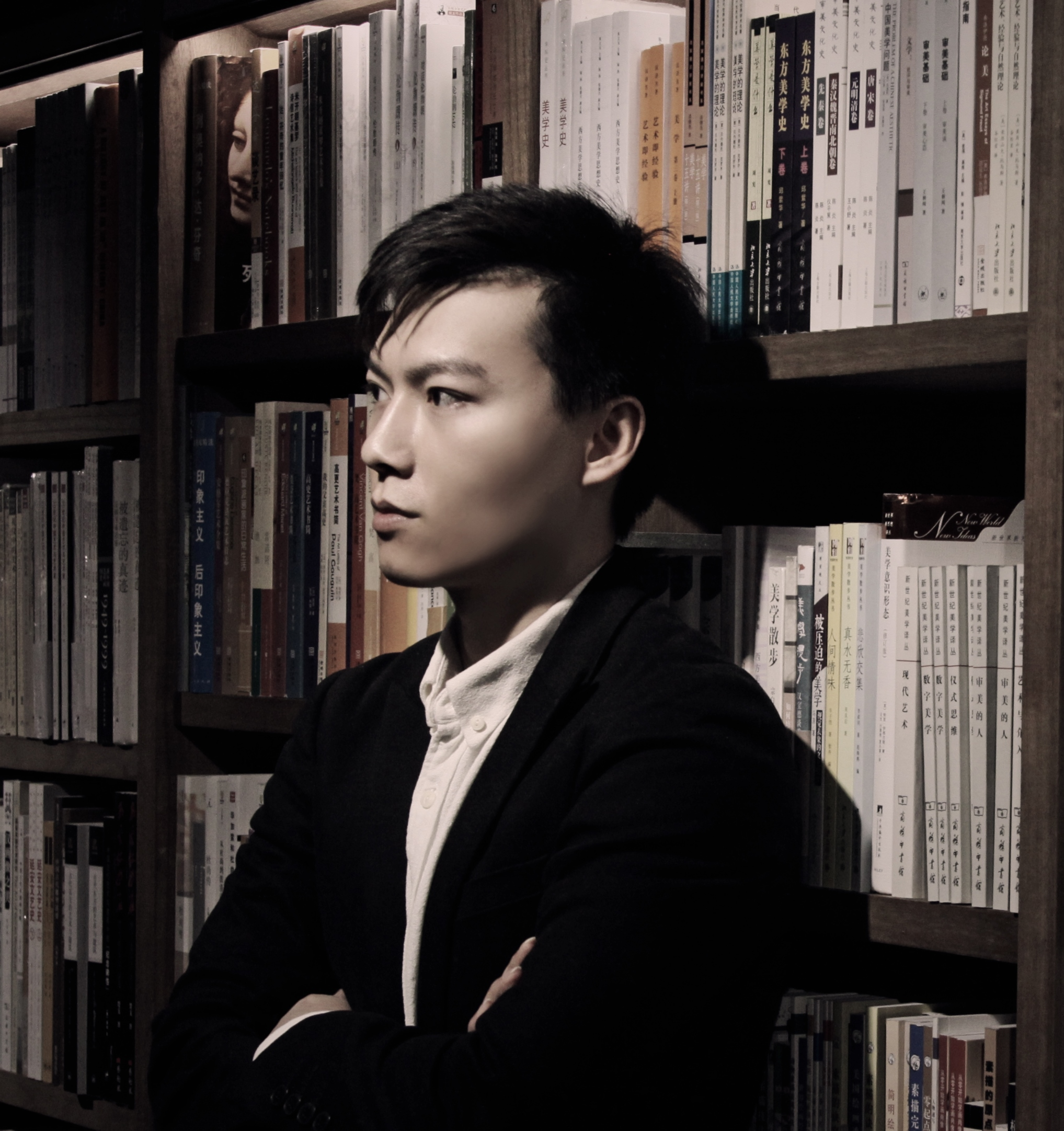
- Born: November 30, 1981 (age 44); Shantou, Guangdong, China
- Other name: Stanley Chan
- Occupations: Science fiction writer, scriptwriter
- Notable work: The Waste Tide

Chen Qiufan (Chinese: 陈楸帆; born 1981), also known as Stanley Chan, is a Chinese science fiction writer, columnist, and scriptwriter. His first novel was Waste Tide (2013), which "combines realism with allegory to present the hybridity of humans and machines". Chen Qiufan's short fiction works have won three Galaxy Awards for Chinese Science Fiction and twelve Nebula Awards for Science Fiction and Fantasy in Chinese. "The Fish of Lijiang" received the Best Short Form Award for the 2012 Science Fiction & Fantasy Translation Awards. His stories have been published in Fantasy & Science Fiction, MIT Technology Review, Clarkesworld Magazine, Year's Best SF, Interzone, and Lightspeed, as well as influential Chinese science fiction magazine Science Fiction World. His works have been translated into German, French, Finnish, Korean, Czech, Italian, Japanese and Polish and other languages.

== Early life ==
Chen was born in Shantou, Guangdong, China in 1981.

He graduated from Peking University in 2004 with dual bachelor's degrees in literature and fine arts, and pursued graduate studies in the Integrated Marketing Communications (IMC) program of Hong Kong University and Tsinghua University. He later worked for Baidu and Google China. In 2017, Chen quit his job to write full-time.

== Writing style ==
Chen's fiction, described as "science fiction realism", focuses on the internal struggles of individuals during times of accelerated change.

Chen cites William Gibson as one of his influences.

Chen has become known for his use of AI-generated content in his stories. His story, "State of Trance," which appeared in The Book of Shanghai, a 2020 short story collection, used automatically generated paragraphs based on his own writing. That story won him a literary prize in a contest moderated by an AI judge, over Nobel laureate Mo Yan. He is currently working on a six-story collection about the relationship between humans and artificial intelligence. Chen's collaboration with Kai-Fu Lee, AI 2041: Ten Visions for Our Future, was published in September, 2021.

== Selected works ==
Novels

- The Waste Tide (荒潮, 2013 in Chinese, translated by Ken Liu and published in English by Tor & Head of Zeus in 2019, Turkish edition was published in 2021. German, Spanish, Japanese, Russian editions are forthcoming)
- AI 2041: Ten visions for our future《AI 2041：預見10個未來新世界》 (2021, with Kai-Fu Lee) Ten short stories by Chen Qiufan and commentary by Kai-Fu Lee, about the impact that artificial intelligence technologies will have on our society in the next twenty years.

Short stories

- "The Tomb", 坟 (2004)
- "The Fish of Lijiang", 丽江的鱼儿们, first published in Chinese in Science Fiction World in May 2006, first published in English in Clarkesworld in August 2011 later published in the anthology Invisible Planets, ISBN 978-0765384195
- "The Year of the Rat", 鼠年, first published in Chinese in Science Fiction World in May 2009, first published in English in The Magazine of Fantasy & Science Fiction in July/August 2013, later published in the anthology Invisible Planets, ISBN 978-0765384195
- "The Smog Society", 霾 (2010)
- "The Endless Farewell", 无尽的告别 (2011)
- "The Mao Ghost", 猫的灵魂 (2012)
- "The Flower of Shazui", 沙嘴之花, first published in Chinese in ZUI Ink-Minority Report in 2012, first published in English in Interzone in November–December 2012, later published in the anthology Invisible Planets, ISBN 978-0765384195
- "The Animal Watcher" 动物观察者 (2012)
- " A History of Future Illnesses", 未来病史, first published in Chinese in April–December 2012 in ZUI Found, first published in English in Pathlight No. 2 in 2016, later published in the anthology Broken Stars, ISBN 978-1250297662
- "Oil Of Angel", 天使之油 (2013)
- "Balin", 巴鳞 (2015)
- "Coming of the Light", 开光, first published in Chinese in January 2015 in Offline Hacker, first published in English in Clarkesworld in March 2015, later published in the anthology Broken Stars, ISBN 978-1250297662
- "The State of Trance", published in the anthology The Book of Shanghai
