= Xia Jia =

Chinese science fiction writer

Xia Jia 夏笳 (Wang Yao 王瑶)
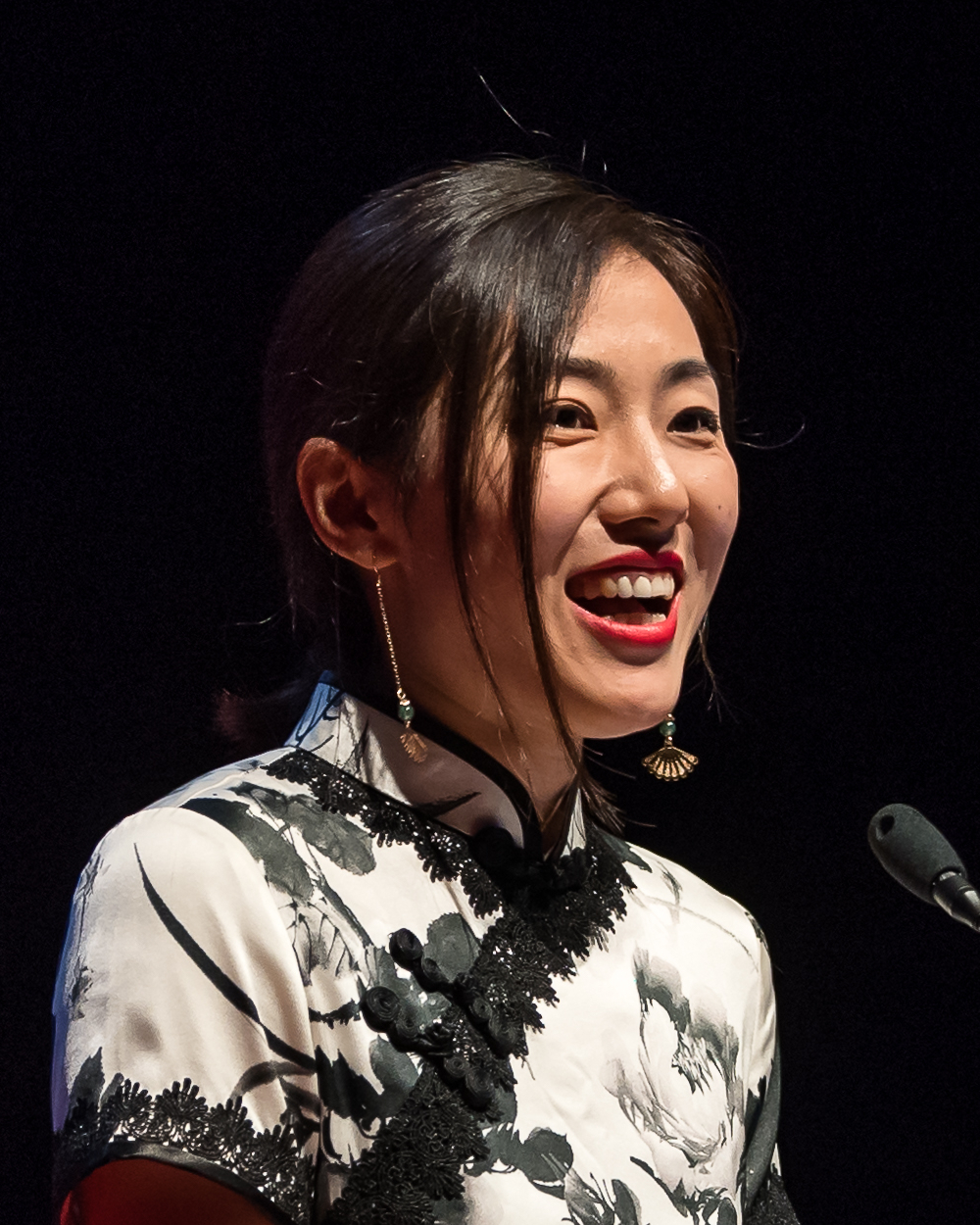
- Xia at the Hugo Award Ceremony at Worldcon in Helsinki, 2017
- Born: 2 June 1984 (age 42); Xi'an, Shaanxi, China
- Citizenship: China
- Education: PhD in Comparative Literature and World Literature, Peking University
- Occupations: Science Fiction Writer, University Lecturer
- Notable work: The Demon-Enslaving Flask; A Hundred Ghosts Parade Tonight; Spring Festival: Happiness, Anger, Love, Sorrow, Joy.

Xia Jia
- Simplified Chinese: 王瑶
- Traditional Chinese: 王瑤
Transcriptions
Standard Mandarin
- Hanyu Pinyin: wáng yáo

Alternative Chinese name
- Simplified Chinese: 夏笳
- Traditional Chinese: 夏笳
Transcriptions
Standard Mandarin
- Hanyu Pinyin: xià jiā

Wang Yao (Chinese: 王瑶; pinyin: Wáng Yáo; born 2 June 1984), known by the pen name Xia Jia (Chinese: 夏笳; pinyin: Xià Jiā), is a Chinese science fiction and fantasy writer. After receiving her Ph.D. in comparative literature and world literature at Department of Chinese, Peking University in 2014, she is currently a lecturer of Chinese literature at Xi'an Jiaotong University.

Xia Jia's short fiction works have won eight Galaxy Awards for Chinese Science Fiction, six Nebula Awards for Science Fiction and Fantasy in Chinese. One of her short stories received honorable mention for 2013 Science Fiction & Fantasy Translation Awards. Her stories have been published in Nature, Clarkesworld Magazine, Year's Best SF, SF Magazine as well as influential Chinese sci-fi magazine Science Fiction World. Besides those written in Chinese and English, her works have been translated into Czech, French, German, Italian, Japanese and Polish.

== Biography and notable works ==
Xia Jia entered School of Physics, Peking University in 2002. As an undergraduate, Xia Jia majored in Atmospheric Sciences. She then entered the Film Studies Program at the Communication University of China, where she completed her Master's thesis: "A Study on Female Figures in Science Fiction Films". Recently, she obtained a Ph.D. in Comparative Literature and World Literature at Peking University, with "Chinese Science Fiction and Its Cultural Politics Since 1990" as the topic of her dissertation. She now teaches at the School of Humanities and Social Sciences, Xi'an Jiaotong University.

During her collegiate life she began to write science fiction works and took part in student clubs for science fiction and fantasy fans. Her short stories have attracted critical acclaim from the outset, beginning with her early Chinese Galaxy Award recipient "Guan Yaojing de Pingzi" 关妖精的瓶子 (April 2004 Science Fiction World trans Linda Rui Feng as "The Demon-Enslaving Flask" November 2012 Renditions). A work of fabulation, in which the scientist James Clerk Maxwell (1831–1879) is offered a Faustian challenge by a literal demon, its selection was attended by a spat among critics as to whether it could be called science fiction at all. The story is mired so deeply in anecdotes from the history of science, and literal interpretations of famous thought experiments, that it requires copious footnotes to explain its own jokes. This, however, seems very much in keeping with the classical, didactic tradition in Chinese science fiction, creating a story whose fantasy elements are mere vectors to convey information about the life and work of icon figures such as Archimedes, Albert Einstein, Erwin Schrödinger and Maxwell himself.

Later work mirrored her personal academic journey from hard science into the creative arts. Her first longer work was "Jiuzhou Nilü" 九州•逆旅 "On the Road: Odyssey of China Fantasy" (coll of linked stories 2009), part of the Jiuzhou shared universe fantasy series. "Bai Gui Ye Xing Jie" 百鬼夜行街 (August 2010 Science Fiction World trans Ken Liu as "A Hundred Ghosts Parade Tonight" February 2012 Clarkesworld Magazine) is far subtler and more mature, a child's eye view of life inside what first appears to be a haunted Keep redolent of Chinese ghost stories, but is gradually revealed as a run-down Far Future theme park populated with Cyborg simulacra. It was nominated for the Short Form Award of 2013 Science Fiction & Fantasy Translation Awards announced at Liburnicon 2013, held in Opatija, Croatia, between 23–25 August 2013, and received honorable mention at the ceremony.

On 4 June 2015 (online on the previous date) Xia Jia's short story "Let's Have a Talk" (让我们说说话) was published on Nature, 522, 122. One of the earliest Chinese fiction writers who published on Nature, Xia Jia has received international reputation among sci-fi fans worldwide.

== Research and film experiment ==
Xia Jia conducts literary research on Chinese science fiction. During her postgraduate programs, her academic advisor was the famous female cultural critic, Dai Jinhua, Professor in the Institute of Comparative Literature and Culture, Peking University. Following Dai, Xia Jia does not only compose literary works and critiques, but also studies sci-fi films and once directed and staged an experimental sci-fi film Parapax (2007), in which the protagonist (acted herself) appeared as three identities in their respective parallel universes.

One of Xia Jia's research treatises, "Chinese Science Fiction in Post-Three-Body Era", originally published on People's Daily, 7 April 2015, received Silver Award for Best Review Articles at 6th Nebula Awards for Science Fiction and Fantasy in Chinese, 18 October 2015.

While teaching at Xi'an Jiaotong University, one of the C9 League Chinese top research universities, Xia Jia presided lectures about Chinese science fiction and acts as the advisor for Xi'an Alliance of University Science Fiction Fans.

== Bibliography ==
=== Novel ===
- On the Road: Odyssey of China Fantasy (九州•逆旅) (2009)

=== Short stories ===
==== 2004 ====
- "The Demon-Enslaving Flask" 关妖精的瓶子
  - Won Best New Writer Award at 16th Galaxy Award for Chinese Science Fiction, 2004.
  - Trans. into English by Linda Rui Feng in Renditions, 77 & 78, Spring/Autumn 2012.

==== 2005 ====
- "Nightingale" (夜莺)
- "Carmen" 卡门
  - Readers' Nomination Award at 17th Galaxy Award for Chinese Science Fiction, 2005.
  - Trans. into Japanese by Hisayuki Hayashi 林 久之 as カルメン "Karumen" in S-Fマガジン (S-F Magazine) 614, June 2007, Special Volume II for Unique Writers 異色作家特集II.

==== 2006 ====
- "Rainy Season" (九州•雨季)
- "Dinosaurs: Jiuzhou Fantasies" (恐龙：九州幻想)

==== 2007 ====
- "Dreaming of Yao" (九州•梦垚)
- "Twin Lotus Flowers" (并蒂莲)
- "Black Cat" (黑猫)
- "One Day", Science Fiction World, March 2007.
- "Miss Aubergine" (茄子小姐)
- "Encountering Anna" (遇见安娜)

==== 2008 ====
- "Nightingale (Expanded)" (夜莺(扩展版))
- "A Dream of Perpetual Summer" (永夏之梦)
  - Honorable Mention at 20th Galaxy Award for Chinese Science Fiction, 2008.
- "On the Miluo River" (汨罗江上)

==== 2009 ====
- "Daosheng Bai Yutang" 盗圣白玉汤 Sage of Thieves: Bai Yutang, Science Fiction World, Supplementary issue, 2009.
- "Duzi Lüxing" 独自旅行 Travel alone, New Realms of Fantasy and Science Fiction 新幻界, August 2009.
- "Wode Mingzi Jiao Sun Shangxiang" 我的名字叫孙尚香 My Name is Sun Shangxiang, Fly - Fantasy World, September 2009.
- "Qingcheng yixiao" 倾城一笑 A City-collapsing Smile, Jiuzhou Fantasies: Ninefold Loom 九州幻想•九张机, New World Publishing House, September 2009.
- "Jiuzhou Shiri Jin" 九州•十日锦 Ten-day Brocade, Jiuzhou Fantasies: Ten-day Brocade 九州幻想•十日锦, New World Publishing House, October 2009.

==== 2010 ====
- "A Hundred Ghosts Parade Tonight" (百鬼夜行街)
  - Honorable Mention at 22nd Galaxy Award for Chinese Science Fiction, 2010; Silver Award at 2nd Nebula Awards for Science Fiction and Fantasy in Chinese, 2010. Honorable Mention at the 2013 Science Fiction & Fantasy Translation Awards, Short Form.
  - Trans. into English by Ken Liu in Clarkesworld, February 2012, reprinted in The Year’s Best Science Fiction and Fantasy, 2013 Edition, edited by Rich Horton, reprinted in The Apex Book of World SF: Volume 3, edited by Lavie Tidhar. Trans. into Polish by Piotr Kosiński as Nocna Parada Duchów in Nowa Fantastyka 361, October 2012. Trans. into Italian by Gabriella Goria as Stanotte sfilano cento fantasmi in Festa di Primavera (Future Fiction vol. 22), Mincione Edizioni, May 2015.

==== 2011 ====
- "Heat Island" (热岛)
  - Trans. into English by Ken Liu in Pathlight - New Chinese Writing, Foreign Languages Press, Spring 2015.
- "Children Say What They Like: Unspeakable" (童言无忌•不可言传)
- "Children Say What They Like: Promise" (童言无忌•一言为定)
- "To Kill a Science-Fiction Writer" (杀死一个科幻作家)
  - Readers' Nomination Award at 23rd Galaxy Award for Chinese Science Fiction, 2011; Silver Award at 3rd Nebula Awards for Science Fiction and Fantasy in Chinese, 2011.

==== 2012 ====
- "Tongyan Wuji Yaoyan Huozhong" 童言无忌•妖言惑众 Children Say What They Like: Misleading Spells, Jiuzhou Fantasies: Ironclad Still 九州幻想•铁甲依然, New World Publishing House, January 2012.
- "Tongyan Wuji Yanchuan Shenjiao" 童言无忌•言传身教 Children Say What They Like: Walk by Talk, Jiuzhou Fantasies: Dust in the Journey 九州幻想•衣上征尘, New World Publishing House, February 2012.
- "Ni Wufa Dida de Shijian" 你无法抵达的时间 Inaccessible Time
- "Duanceng -- Yige Dongye de Kehuan Gushi" 断层——一个冬夜的科幻故事 The Fault—A Science Fiction Story in a Winter Night
- "Liuyue Wuyu" 六月物语 A Monogatari in June
- "Yongyuan de Baise Qingrenjie" 永远的白色情人节 White Valentine Forever
- "Tianshang" 天上 On the Heaven
- "Yongganzhe Youxi" 勇敢者游戏 Game of the Brave
- "Maka" 马卡 Maca—All seven items above in Xia Jia's anthology "Guan Yaojing de Pingzi" 关妖精的瓶子 The Demon-Enslaving Flask, Sichuan Science and Technology Press, October 2010, also included previous short stories published in SF magazines.

==== 2013 ====
- "2044 Chunjie Jiushi" 2044春节旧事 Spring Festival: Happiness, Anger, Love, Sorrow, Science Fiction World, June 2013. Silver Award at 4th Nebula Awards for Science Fiction and Fantasy in Chinese, 2013. Trans. into English by Ken Liu in Clarkesworld, September 2014. Trans. into Italian by Gabriella Goria as Festa di primavera in Festa di Primavera (Future Fiction vol. 22), Mincione Edizioni, May 2015.

==== 2014 ====
- "Tongtong de Xiatian" 童童的夏天 Tongtong's Summer, Zui Xiaoshuo 最小说, March 2014. Trans. into English by Ken Liu in Upgraded, ed. Neil Clarke, Wyrm Publishing, 2014. Trans. into Polish by Kamil Lesiew as Lato Tongtong in Nowa Fantastyka 388, January 2015. Trans. into Italian by Gabriella Goria as L'estate di Tongtong in Festa di Primavera (Future Fiction vol. 22), Mincione Edizioni, May 2015. Trans. into Czech by Daniela Orlando as Tchung-tchungino léto in XB-1: Měsíčník sci-fi, fantasy a hororu, November 2015. Trans. into French by Gwennaël Gaffric as L'Été de Tongtong in Galaxies (nouvelle série) no. 71, June 2021.
- "Ni Xuyao de Zhi Shi Ai" 你需要的只是爱 What You Need is Simply Love, Guangming Daily 光明日报, 15 August 2014, page 14.

==== 2015 ====
- "Longma Yexing" 龙马夜行 Night Walk of the Dragon-horse, Fiction World 小说界, February 2015.
- "Zhongguo Baikequanshu: Heiwu" 中国百科全书（1）黑屋 Encyclopedia Sinica I: Dark Room, Science Fiction World, April 2015 (An expansion of "Let's Have a Talk" in Mandarin), Silver Award at 6th Nebula Awards for Science Fiction and Fantasy in Chinese, 2015.
- "Zhongguo Baikequanshu: She Jiang" 中国百科全书（2）涉江 Encyclopedia Sinica II: Cross the River, Science Fiction World, May 2015.
- "Zhongguo Baikequanshu: Wan'an Youyu" 中国百科全书（3）晚安忧郁 Encyclopedia Sinica III: Goodnight Melancholy, Science Fiction World, June 2015.
- "Let's Have a Talk", Nature 522, 122, June 4, 2015. doi:10.1038/522122a (Originally written in English)
- "Handong Yexing Ren" 寒冬夜行人 If on a Winter's Night a Traveler, Guangming Daily, June 5, 2015, page 14. Trans. by Ken Liu in Clarkesworld, November 2015.
- "Zhongguo Baikequanshu: Babie Luan" 中国百科全书（4）巴别乱 Encyclopedia Sinica IV: Babel Babble, Science Fiction World, August 2015.
- "Tick-Tock" 滴答 (English-Mandarin bilingual short story), Winner of SFComet 13th short story competition, August 2015.
- "Zhongguo Baikequanshu: Deng Yun Lai" 中国百科全书（5）等云来 Encyclopedia Sinica V: Waiting for Clouds, Science Fiction World, September 2015.
- "Xinli Youxi" 心理游戏 Mind Games, Knowledge is Power 知识就是力量, September 2015.
- "Xiri Guang" 昔日光 Yesterday's Brilliance, Guangming Daily, October 30, 2015, page 14.

== See also ==
- List of science fiction writers
- World SF
- Chinese science fiction
- Science Fiction World
- Ken Liu
- Liu Cixin
