= Ken Liu =

American writer (born 1976)

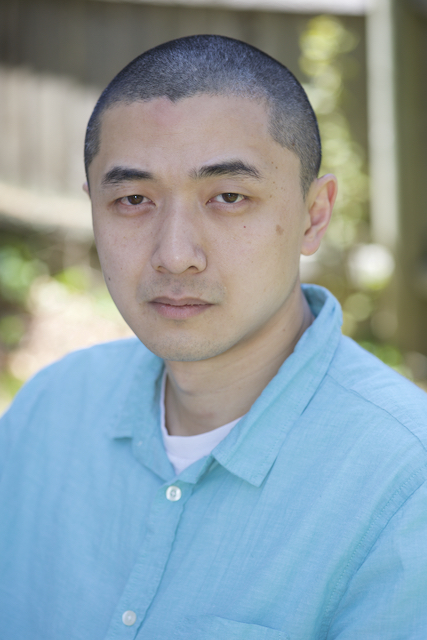
- Ken Liu in 2014
- Born: 刘宇昆; Liú Yǔkūn; 1976 (age 49–50); Lanzhou, Gansu, China
- Occupations: Author; Lawyer; Programmer; Translator
- Spouse: Lisa Kaiyee Tang Liu
- Writing career
- Genres: Science fiction, fantasy
- Notable works: The Paper Menagerie (2011); The Grace of Kings (2015); The Paper Menagerie and Other Stories (2016); The Hidden Girl and Other Stories (2020); All That We See or Seem (2025)
- Notable awards: Hugo Awards (×4); Locus Awards (×3); FantLab's Awards (×2); Nebula Award (×1); Sidewise Award (×1); World Fantasy Award (×1)
- Website: kenliu.name

Ken Liu
- Traditional Chinese: 劉宇昆
- Simplified Chinese: 刘宇昆
Transcriptions
Standard Mandarin
- Hanyu Pinyin: Liú Yǔkūn
- IPA: [ljǒʊ ỳ.kʰwə́n]

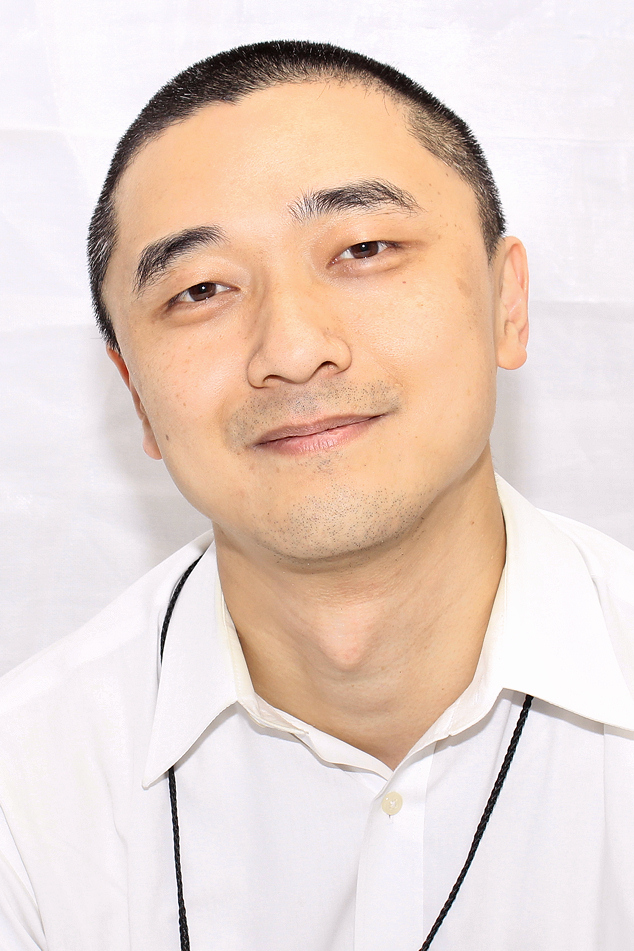
Ken Liu in 2016

Kenneth Yukun Liu (born 1976) is an American author of science fiction and fantasy. Liu has won multiple Hugo and Nebula Awards for his fiction, which has appeared in F&SF, Asimov's Science Fiction, Analog, Lightspeed, Clarkesworld, Reactor, Uncanny Magazine and multiple "Year's Best" anthologies.

Liu's debut epic fantasy novel series, The Dandelion Dynasty, is described as silkpunk, a term coined by him to encapsulate the way it blends the material culture and philosophical roots of East Asian antiquity in an alternative vision of modernity.

In addition to his original fiction, Liu has also translated some notable Chinese science fiction works into English, winning Hugo Awards for these translations as well.

== Early life and education ==
Liu was born in Lanzhou, China. He spent his childhood with his grandparents and credits his grandmother as giving him a lifelong love of storytelling. His mother is a pharmaceutical chemist who received her Ph.D. in chemistry in the United States, while his father is a computer engineer. Liu immigrated to the United States when he was 11 years old. They lived in California and Stonington, Connecticut before settling in Waterford, Connecticut. Liu graduated from Waterford High School in 1994, where he ran cross-country and track. At Harvard College, he studied English Literature and Computer Science, receiving his A.B. in 1998.

After graduation, Liu worked as a software engineer for Microsoft, and then joined a start-up in Cambridge, Massachusetts. He later received his J.D. from Harvard Law School in 2004 and worked as a corporate lawyer, eventually becoming a high-tech litigation consultant. He became a full-time writer in 2017.

== Career ==
Liu began publishing fiction in 2002. His first published work was "Carthaginian Rose", a short story on mind uploading, part of The Phobos Science Fiction Anthology Volume 1. This story would later become part of the AMC series Pantheon.

Liu has said he wanted to become a writer so he could make stories that "turn values upside down and inside out to gain new perspectives".

In addition to magazines and online publications, Liu's short story fiction has been published in two collections, The Paper Menagerie and Other Stories (2016), which blends science fiction and fantasy to ask questions about historiography, cultural reinvention, storytelling, and transhumanism, and The Hidden Girl and Other Stories (2020) which explores ideas such as tradition and progress, the fallibility of memory, and the essence of what it means to be human.

After a long career writing and publishing short fiction, Liu turned to a silkpunk epic fantasy series about an alternative vision of how a multi-cultural society can transition into modernity based on both East Asian and Western values, consisting of The Grace of Kings (2015), The Wall of Storms (2016), The Veiled Throne (2021), and Speaking Bones (2022).

He has also written for the Star Wars universe, including the novel The Legends of Luke Skywalker (2017), a series of Canterbury-tale like in-universe legends.

Along with his original work, Liu has translated the works of several Chinese authors into English, including Liu Cixin, Hao Jingfang, Chen Qiufan, Gu Shi, and Xia Jia. His translation of The Three Body Problem by Liu Cixin became a best seller in English. He has also worked as an editor, with two anthologies of translated Chinese fiction, Invisible Planets and Broken Stars. His latest translation is a new rendition of Laozi's Dao De Jing: A New Interpretation for a Transformative Time.

Some of Liu's work have been adapted into visual media. His short story "Memories of My Mother" was the basis of Beautiful Dreamer (2016) by David Gaddie. His short story "Real Artists" was adapted into the short film Real Artists (2017) by Cameo Wood. His short story "Good Hunting", which uses steampunk to interrogate the consequences of Western colonialism and Chinese modernity, was adapted into an animated short as part of Netflix's Love, Death & Robots series (2019). Six stories in The Hidden Girl and Other Stories and "Carthaginian Rose" were adapted by Craig Silverstein into the animated television series Pantheon.

During the COVID-19 pandemic, Liu was disturbed by finger-pointing, jingoism, and xenophobia in the face of what he saw as an existential, global threat to all humanity; he began to seek solace in the Tao Te Ching and subsequently released a new translation of the ancient text, Laozi's Dao De Jing: A New Interpretation for a Transformative Time (2024).

His latest work is a series of sci-fi thrillers starting with All That We See or Seem (2025), featuring a young hacker named Julia Z. The series engages with the impacts of AI and its consequences on the arts, law, and other aspects of everyday life.

== Personal life ==
Liu frequently speaks at conferences, think tanks, and universities on a variety of topics related to the evolving nature of work, machine-augmented creativity, and other aspects of futurism.

Liu lives with his family near Boston, Massachusetts.

== Awards ==
Liu's short story "The Paper Menagerie" is the first work of fiction, of any length, to win all of the Nebula, Hugo, and World Fantasy Awards. In addition, his short story, "Mono no aware" won the 2013 Hugo Award, and his novella "The Man Who Ended History: A Documentary" was also nominated for a Hugo. The first novel in his The Dandelion Dynasty series, The Grace of Kings, was a 2016 Nebula Award finalist. The novel was the 2016 Locus Award Best First Novel winner.

Besides his original work, Liu's translation of Liu Cixin's Chinese language novel The Three-Body Problem (the first in the Remembrance of Earth's Past trilogy) won the 2015 Hugo Award for Best Novel, making it the first translated novel to have won the award. Liu also translated Hao Jingfang's novelette, "Folding Beijing," which won a Hugo in 2016.

=== Winner ===
- 2011 Nebula Award for Best Short Story, winner, "The Paper Menagerie"
- 2012 Science Fiction & Fantasy Translation Awards, Short Form winner, translation from the Chinese of "The Fish of Lijiang" by Chen Qiufan
- 2012 World Fantasy Award for Best Short Fiction, winner, "The Paper Menagerie"
- 2012 Hugo Award for Best Short Story, winner, "The Paper Menagerie"
- 2013 FantLab's Book of the Year Award for Best Online Publication in Small Form', winner, "The Paper Menagerie"
- 2013 FantLab's Book of the Year Award for Best Translated Novella or Short Story, winner, "Mono no aware"
- 2013 Hugo Award for Best Short Story, winner, "Mono no aware"
- 2015 Hugo Award for Best Novel, winner, "The Three-Body Problem (三体)" by Liu Cixin, translated by Ken Liu
- 2015 Sidewise Award for Alternate History, winner, "The Long Haul: From the Annals of Transportation, The Pacific Monthly, May 2009"
- 2016 Locus Award for Best First Novel, winner, The Grace of Kings
- 2016 Hugo Award for Best Novelette, winner, "Folding Beijing" by Hao Jingfang, translated by Ken Liu
- 2017 Locus Award for Best Collection, winner, The Paper Menagerie and Other Stories
- 2017 Locus Award for Best Science Fiction Novel, winner, "Death's End" by Cixin Liu, translated by Ken Liu
- 2021 Locus Award for Best Collection, winner, The Hidden Girl and Other Stories

=== Finalists and nominated ===
- 2011 Nebula Award for Best Novella, nominee, "The Man Who Ended History: A Documentary"
- 2012 Nebula Award for Best Short Story, nominee, "The Bookmaking Habits of Select Species"
- 2012 Nebula Award for Best Novelette, nominee, "The Waves"
- 2012 Nebula Award for Best Novella, nominee, "All the Flavors"
- 2012 Theodore Sturgeon Award, finalist, "The Man Who Ended History: A Documentary" and "The Paper Menagerie"
- 2012 Locus Award for Best Short Story, finalist, "The Paper Menagerie"
- 2012 Hugo Award for Best Novella, nominee, "The Man Who Ended History: A Documentary"
- 2013 Locus Award for Best Short Story, finalist, "Mono no aware"
- 2013 Nebula Award for Best Novelette, nominee, The Litigation Master and the Monkey King
- 2013 Theodore Sturgeon Award, finalist, "The Bookmaking Habits of Select Species" and "Mono no aware"
- 2014 Nebula Award for Best Novel, nominee, "The Three-Body Problem (三体)" by Cixin Liu, translated by Ken Liu
- 2014 Nebula Award for Best Novella, nominee, "The Regular"
- 2014 Sidewise Award for Alternate History, nominee, "A Brief History of the Trans-Pacific Tunnel"
- 2014 Locus Award for Best Short Story, finalist, "A Brief History of the Trans-Pacific Tunnel"
- 2015 Locus Award for Best Novella, finalist, "The Regular"
- 2015 Nebula Award for Best Novel, finalist, The Grace of Kings
- 2015 Theodore Sturgeon Award, finalist, "The Regular"
- 2017 Hugo Award for Best Novel, finalist, Death's End by Cixin Liu, translated by Ken Liu
- 2017 World Fantasy Award, nominee, The Paper Menagerie and Other Stories, Best Collection
- 2020 Locus Award for Best Short Story, finalist, "Thoughts and Prayers"
- 2026 Locus Award for Best Science Fiction Novel, finalist, All That We See or Seem

== Bibliography ==
Liu is well known for his short story "The Paper Menagerie", his Dandelion Dynasty fantasy novel series, and his translation of Cixin Liu's novel The Three-Body Problem and its sequels. For a more comprehensive list of Liu's works, see the linked bibliography page.

== Filmography ==
=== Television ===
Pantheon is an animated television series based on Liu's sci-fi short stories "The Gods Will Not Be Chained", "The Gods Will Not Be Slain", "The Gods Have Not Died in Vain", "Staying Behind" and "Altogether Elsewhere, Vast Herds of Reindeer" from the short fictions collection The Hidden Girl and Other Stories. It premiered on AMC+ in 2022.

His short story "Good Hunting" was adapted into an animated short as part of Netflix's Love, Death & Robots anthology series (2019).
