= Seiun Award =

Japanese speculative fiction award

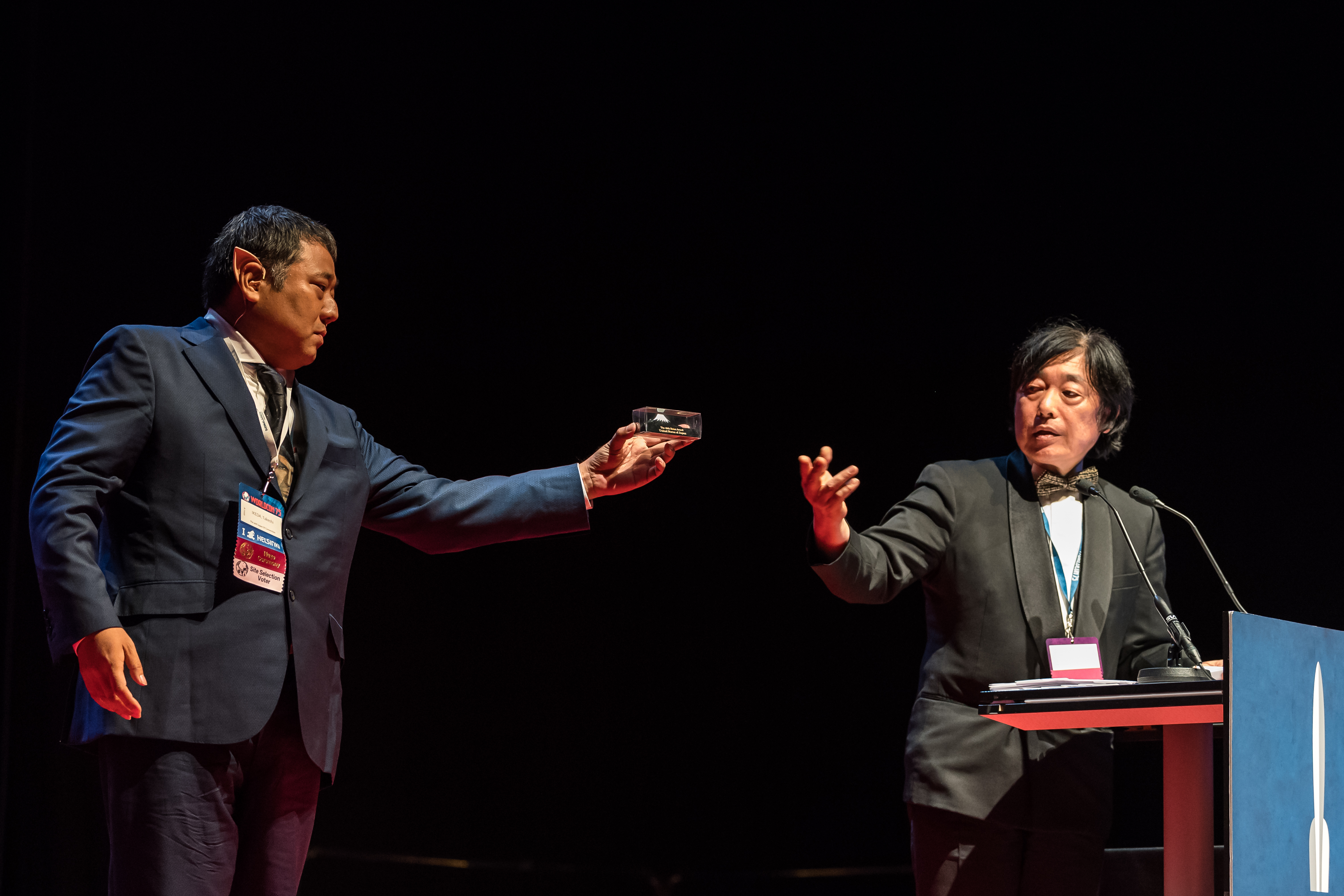
- Takeshi Ikeda handing the Seiun Award prize to Takayuki Tatsumi, at the Hugo Awards Ceremony 2017 at Worldcon in Helsinki
- Awarded for: Science fiction works and achievements of previous year
- Country: Japan
- First award: 1970; 56 years ago
- Website: www.sf-fan.gr.jp/awards/index.html

The Seiun Award (Japanese: 星雲賞, Hepburn: Seiunshō) is a Japanese speculative fiction award given each year for the best science fiction works and achievements during the previous calendar year. Organized and overseen by the Science Fiction Fan Groups' Association of Nippon (日本SFファングループ連合会議, Nihon Esu Efu Fan Gurūpu Rengō Kaigi; abbr. SFFAN), the awards are given at the annual Japan Science Fiction Convention. It is the oldest SF award in Japan, being given since the 9th Japan Science Fiction Convention in 1970.

"Seiun", the Japanese word for "nebula", was taken from the first professional science fiction magazine in Japan, which had a short run in 1954. The award is not related to the American Nebula Award.

It is similar to the Hugo Award, which is presented by the members of the World Science Fiction Society, in that all of the members of the presenting convention are eligible to participate in the selection process, though it is not a one-on-one comparison as the Hugo Awards are open to works from anywhere in any language, while the Seiun is implicitly limited to works released in Japan and written in or translated to Japanese.

== Eligibility and the selection process ==
A professional work or achievement which appeared for the first time in the previous calendar year may be considered eligible. The eligibility of magazines is determined via nominal publication date, which often tend to be a month or two ahead of the actual date due to Japanese publication customs.

There are no written rules about word count for literary fiction categories, so that the decision of eligibility in that regard is left up to the voters.

Usually in spring, SFFAN issues reference nominee lists for reference in each category, which is chosen by the preliminary vote of their member groups. However, voters can cast their ballots for any eligible works outside of the list in the final ballot.

With consideration for voters' availability, a work which appears in a magazine (such as a part of serialized works or short story) or released as audio-visual media (such as a TV show or film) but wasn't chosen for the reference nominee lists may be eligible again if published as a book or released in any other media format.

=== Categories ===
There are effectively no official English names for categories, so they vary depending on translators. For example, "Long Work" may be written as "Long Story", "Long Form", or "Novel"; "Short Story" may be referred to as "Short Form" and so on.

Current categories	Year started	Current description
Best Japanese Long Work (日本長編, Nihon Chōhen)	1970	Science fiction novels and stories which appear or are translated for the first time during the eligible year. Serialized works on magazines may be eligible when they are finished; other works may be eligible when they get published as a book. A multi-volume work may also be eligible as a whole series when it concludes.
Best Japanese Short Story (日本短編, Nihon Tanpen)	1970	Science fiction novels and stories which appear or are translated for the first time during the eligible year. Serialized works on magazines may be eligible when they are finished; other works may be eligible when they get published as a book. A multi-volume work may also be eligible as a whole series when it concludes.
Best Translated Long Work (海外長編, Kaigai Chōhen)	1970	Science fiction novels and stories which appear or are translated for the first time during the eligible year. Serialized works on magazines may be eligible when they are finished; other works may be eligible when they get published as a book. A multi-volume work may also be eligible as a whole series when it concludes.
Best Translated Short Story (海外短編, Kaigai Tanpen)	1970	Science fiction novels and stories which appear or are translated for the first time during the eligible year. Serialized works on magazines may be eligible when they are finished; other works may be eligible when they get published as a book. A multi-volume work may also be eligible as a whole series when it concludes.
Best Dramatic Presentation (メディア, Media)	1970	Films, plays, and any other audio-visual works. As is the case with Long Works, serial dramatic works can be nominated as a single entity upon their conclusion. Note: The name was changed from "Best Film & Play" (映画・演劇, Eiga Engeki) in 1980.
Best Comic (コミック, Comic)	1978	Manga. Serial works may be nominated upon completion as is the case with Long Works.
Best Artist (アート, Art)	1978	Artists with notable achievements.
Best Nonfiction (ノンフィクション, Nonfiction)	1985	Nonfiction works about SF such as studies and critiques, including translated ones. Serial nonfiction can be nominated upon completion as is the case with Long Works.
Non category Nomination (自由, Jiyū)	2002	Any events which do not fit in other categories, such as "things", phenomena, or feats of science and technology.

== Winners and candidates ==
=== Best Japanese Long Work ===
* Winners and joint winners + No winner selected

Year	Work	Author(s)	Publisher or publication
1970	Primates Go South (霊長類南へ, Reichōrui Minami e)	Yasutaka Tsutsui	Kodansha
1971	Who Will Take Over? (継ぐのは誰か?, Tsugu no wa Dare ka?)	Sakyo Komatsu	Sekai SF Zenshū Vol.29: Sakyo Komatsu, Hayakawa Publishing
1972	The Bloodline of the Stone (石の血脈, Ishi no Ketsumyaku)	Ryō Hanmura	Nihon SF Novels, Hayakawa Publishing
1973	Through the Looking-Glass, and What Alice Found There (鏡の国のアリス, Kagami no Kuni no Alice)	Tadashi Hirose	Kawade Shobō Shinsha
1974	Japan Sinks (日本沈没, Nihon Chinbotsu)	Sakyo Komatsu	Kappa Novels, Kōbunsha
1975	My Blood Is Someone Else's Blood (おれの血は他人の血, Ore no Chi wa Tanin no Chi)	Yasutaka Tsutsui	Kawade Shobō Shinsha
1976	Nanase Once More (七瀬ふたたび, Nanase Futatabi)	Yasutaka Tsutsui	Shinchōsha
1977	Dice Suicide Corps (サイコロ特攻隊, Saikoro Tokkōtai)	Musashi Kanbe	Nihon SF Novels, Hayakawa Publishing
1978	Earth - The Record of Psychoanalyzation: Eld Analusis (地球・精神分析記録 (エルド・アナリュシス), Chikyū Seishin Bunseki Kiroku: Eld Analusis)	Masaki Yamada	Tokuma Shoten
1979	The Aureole of Vanishment (消滅の光輪, Shōmetsu no Kōrin)	Taku Mayumura	SF Magazine Feb 1976 - Oct 1978
1980	Jewel Thief (宝石泥棒, Hōseki Dorobō)	Masaki Yamada	SF Magazine Dec 1977 - Aug 1979
1981	Martian's Prehistory (火星人先史, Kaseijin Senshi)	Chiaki Kawamata	SF Magazine Jul 1979 - Oct 1980
1982	Kirikiri People (吉里吉里人, Kirikirijin)	Hisashi Inoue	Shinchosha
1983	Bye-bye, Jupiter (さよならジュピター, Sayonara Jupiter)	Sakyo Komatsu	Sankei Shuppan
1984	The Enemy Is Pirates: Pirates Edition (敵は海賊 海賊版, Teki wa Kaizoku: Kaizokuban)	Chōhei Kanbayashi	Hayakawa Bunko JA, Hayakawa Publishing
1985	Yukikaze (戦闘妖精・雪風, Sentō Yōsei Yukikaze)	Chōhei Kanbayashi	Hayakawa Bunko JA, Hayakawa Publishing
1986	The Dirty Pair Strike Again (ダーティ・ペアの大逆転, Dirty-Pair no Daigyakuten)	Haruka Takachiho	Hayakawa Publishing
1987	Prism (プリズム)	Chōhei Kanbayashi	Hayakawa Bunko JA, Hayakawa Publishing
1988	Legend of the Galactic Heroes (銀河英雄伝説, Ginga Eiyū Densetsu) (10 books)	Yoshiki Tanaka	Tokuma Novels, Tokuma Shonten
1989	Babylonia Wave (バビロニア・ウェーブ)	Akira Hori	Tokuma Shoten
1990	The Lion Witch Eats Waxing Moon (上弦の月を喰べる獅子, Jōgen no Tsuki o Taberu Shishi)	Baku Yumemakura	Hayakawa Publishing
1991	Hybrid Child (ハイブリッド・チャイルド)	Mariko Ōhara	Hayakawa Publishing
1992	The Boy in Mersas (メルサスの少年, Mersas no Shōnen)	Hiroe Suga	Shinchō Bunko, Shinchōsha
1993	Venus City (ヴィーナス・シティ)	Gorō Masaki	Hayakawa Publishing
1994	Endless Reconing (終わりなき索敵, Owarinaki Sakuteki)	Kōshū Tani	Hayakawa Publishing
1995	The Machine Gods Corp (機神兵団, Kishin Heidan) (10 books)	Masaki Yamada	C Novels, Chūōkōronsha
1996	The Time of Ebbing Tide (引き潮のとき, Hikishio no Toki) (5 books)	Taku Mayumura	Hayakawa Publishing
1997	Crest of the Stars (星界の紋章, Seikai no Monshō) trilogy	Hiroyuki Morioka	Hayakawa Bunko JA, Hayakawa Publishing
1998	The Enemy Is Pirates: A-rank Enemy (敵は海賊 A級の敵, Teki wa Kaizoku: A-kyū no Teki)	Chōhei Kanbayashi	Hayakawa Bunko JA, Hayakawa Publishing
1999	Comet Hunting (彗星狩り, Suiseigari)	Yūichi Sasamoto	Sonorama Bunko, Asahi Sonorama
2000	Good Luck, Yukikaze (グッドラック 戦闘妖精・雪風, Good Luck: Sentō Yōsei Yukikaze)	Chōhei Kanbayashi	Hayakawa Publishing
2001	Forever Forest (Museum Planet) (永遠の森 博物館惑星, Eien no Mori, Hakubutsukan Wakusei)	Hiroe Suga	Hayakawa Publishing
2002	The Fountain of fluffy (ふわふわの泉, Fuwafuwa no Izumi)	Hōsuke Nojiri	Famitsu Bunko, Enterbrain
2003	Usurper of the Sun (太陽の簒奪者, Taiyō no Sandatsusha)	Hōsuke Nojiri	Hayakawa SF Series J collection, Hayakawa Publishing
2004	The Next Continent (第六大陸, Dai Roku Tairiku)	Issui Ogawa	Hayakawa Bunko JA, Hayakawa Publishing
2005	ARIEL (エリアル)	Yūichi Sasamoto	Sonorama Bunko, Asahi Sonorama
2006	Summer/Time/Traveler (サマー/タイム/トラベラー)	Kazuma Shinjō	Hayakawa Bunko JA, Hayakawa Publishing
2007	Japan Sinks: Part 2 (日本沈没 第二部, Nihon Chinbotsu Dai ni bu)	Sakyo Komatsu	Shogakukan
2007	Japan Sinks: Part 2 (日本沈没 第二部, Nihon Chinbotsu Dai ni bu)	Kōshū Tani	Shogakukan
2008	The Library War (図書館戦争, Toshokan Sensō) (4 books)	Hiro Arikawa	ASCII Media Works
2009	Harmony (ハーモニー)	Keikaku Itō	Hayakawa SF Series J Collection, Hayakawa Publishing
2010	Guin Saga (グイン・サーガ) (130 books)	Kaoru Kurimoto	Hayakawa Bunko JA, Hayakawa Publishing
2011	Last Year Willl be Good One (去年はいい年になるだろう, Kyonen wa Ii Toshi ni Narudarō)	Hiroshi Yamamoto	PHP Institute
2012	Heaven and Hell (天獄と地国, Tengoku to Jigoku)	Yasumi Kobayashi	Hayakawa Bunko JA, Hayakawa Publishing
2013	The Empire of Corpses (屍者の帝国, Shisha no Teikoku)	Keikaku Itō	Kawade Shobō Shinsha
2013	The Empire of Corpses (屍者の帝国, Shisha no Teikoku)	Toh Enjoe	Kawade Shobō Shinsha
2013	Kiryū Police: Dark Market (機龍警察 暗黒市場, Kiryū Keisatsu: Ankoku Shijō)	Ryōe Tsukimura	Hayakawa Publishing
2013	Books Also Have Male and Female (本にだって雄と雌があります, Hon ni datte Osu to Mesu ga Arimasu)	Masakuni Oda	Shinchosha
2013	Beatless (ビートレス)	Satoshi Hase	Kadokawa Shoten
2013	Grimm Fragments (断章のグリム, Danshō no Grimm) (17 books)	Gakuto Kōda	Dengeki Bunko, ASCII Media Works
2013	Delivery (デリバリー)	Masayoshi Yasugi	Hayakawa SF Series J Collection, Hayakawa Publishing
2013	The Law of Hundred Years (百年法, Hyakunen Hō)	Muneki Yamada	Kadokawa Shoten
2014	From Kororogi Range To Jupiter Trojan (コロロギ岳から木星トロヤへ, Kororogi-dake kara Jupiter Trojan e)	Issui Ogawa	Hayakawa Bunko JA, Hayakawa Publishing
2014	Know (ノウ)	Mado Nozaki	Hayakawa Bunko JA, Hayakawa Publishing
2014	Gene Mapper -full build- (ジーン・マッパー フル・ビルド)	Taiyō Fujii	Hayakawa Bunko JA, Hayakawa Publishing
2014	Sisyphean (皆勤の徒, Kaikin no To)	Dempow Torishima	Sogen Nihon SF Selection, Tokyo Sogensha
2014	Crimson Epigraph (深紅の碑文, Shinku no Hibun)	Sayuri Ueda	Hayakawa SF Series J Collection, Hayakawa Publishing
2014	The Fish in Chryse (クリュセの魚, Chryse no Sakana)	Hiroki Azuma	NOVA Collection, Kawade Shobō Shinsha
2014	Black Rider (ブラックライダー)	Akira Higashiyama	Shinchosha
2015	Orbital Cloud (オービタル・クラウド)	Taiyō Fujii	Hayakawa Publishing
2015	The Cataclysmic World (突変, Toppen)	Hiroyuki Morioka	Tokuma Bunko, Tokuma Shoten
2015	Nobody's Son (誰の息子でもない, Dare no Musuko demo Nai)	Chōhei Kanbayashi	Kodansha
2015	To Future (未来へ......, Mirai e...)	Motoko Arai	Kodansha
2015	Humanity Has Declined (人類は衰退しました, Jinrui wa Suitaishimashita) (9 books)	Romeo Tanaka	Gagaga Bunko, Shogakukan
2015	The Deer King (鹿の王, Shika no Ō)	Nahoko Uehashi	KADOKAWA / Kadokawa Shoten
2016	The Resentment Star Zone (怨讐星域, Onshū Seiiki) (3 books)	Shinji Kajio	Hayakawa Bunko JA, Hayakawa Publishing
2016	When the Letter of Waves Echoes (波の手紙が響くとき, Nami no Tegami ga Hibiku Toki)	Takehiko Oxi	Hayakawa SF Series J Collection, Hayakawa Publishing
2016	Exodus Syndrome (エクソダス症候群, Exodus Shōkōgun)	Yūsuke Miyauchi	Sogen Nihon SF Selection, Tokyo Sogensha
2016	Apocalypse of Gallows (絞首台の黙示録, Kōshudai no Mokushiroku)	Chōhei Kanbayashi	Hayakawa Publishing
2016	Tytania (タイタニア) (5 books)	Yoshiki Tanaka	Tokuma Novels, Tokuma Shoten & Kodansha Novels, Kodansha
2016	The Novel of the Lunar World (月世界小説, Gessekai Shōsetsu)	Osamu Makino	Hayakawa Bunko JA, Hayakawa Publishing
2016	Underground Market (アンダーグラウンド・マーケット)	Taiyō Fujii	Asahi Shinbun Shuppan
2016	Epilogue (エピローグ)	Toh Enjoe	Hayakawa Publishing
2016	Canopeum in Fragrance (薫香のカナピウム, Kunkō no Canopeum)	Sayuri Ueda	Bungeishunjū
2017	Ultraman F (ウルトラマンF)	Yasumi Kobayashi	Hayakawa Publishing
2017	When She Was an Esper (彼女がエスパーだったころ, Kanojo ga Esper datta Koro)	Yūsuke Miyauchi	Kodansha
2017	The Cataclysmic World: The Aquapolis in the Strange Land (突変世界 異境の水都, Toppen Sekai: Ikyō no Suito)	Hiroyuki Morioka	Tokuma Shoten
2017	The Spaceport on Blue Ocean (青い海の宇宙港, Aoi Umi no Utyūkō) (2 books)	Hiroto Kawabata	Hayakawa Publishing
2017	Kameri (カメリ)	Yūsaku Kitano	Kawade Shobō Shinsha
2017	Under the Eye of the Big Bird (大きな鳥にさらわれないよう, Ōkina Tori ni Sarawarenaiyō)	Hiromi Kawakami	Kodansha
2017	The Way of Finance in Space (スペース金融道, Space Kin'yūdō)	Yūsuke Miyauchi	Kawade Shobō Shinsha
2017	Bibibi Be-Bop (ビビビ・ビ・バップ)	Hikaru Okuizumi	Kodansha
2018	What Happens Afterwards Is of No Concern to Japanese Beauty (あとは野となれ大和撫子, Ato ha No to Nare Yamatonadeshiko)	Yūsuke Miyauchi	KADOKAWA
2018	Architectural elements (構造素子, Kōzō Soshi)	Kyōsuke Higuchi	Hayakawa Publishing
2018	The Kingdom of Games (ゲームの王国, Game no Ōkoku) (2 books)	Satoshi Ogawa	Hayakawa Publishing
2018	The Plastic Lover (プラスチックの恋人, Plastic no Koibito)	Hiroshi Yamamoto	Hayakawa Publishing
2018	The Mailbox on Mt. Olympus (オリンポスの郵便ポスト, Olympus no Yūbin Post)	Tamao Mono	Dengeki Bunko, KADOKAWA
2018	Yokohama Station SF: National Ver. (横浜駅SF 全国版, Yokohama Eki SF: Zenkoku Ban)	Yuba Isukari	Kadokawa Books, KADOKAWA
2018	Nogray the Space Detective (宇宙探偵ノーグレイ, Uchū Tantei Nogray)	Hirofumi Tanaka	Kawade Bunko, Kawade Shobō Shinsha
2018	The Heroic Legend of Arslan (アルスラーン戦記, Arslan Senki) (16 books)	Yoshiki Tanaka	Kappa Novels, Kōbunsha
2019	Harp Number Zero (零號琴, Reigōkin)	Hirotaka Tobi	Hayakawa Publishing
2019	Outside of the Planetarium (プラネタリウムの外側, Planetarium no Sotogawa)	Kō Hayase	Hayakawa Publishing
2019	Hello, World (ハロー・ワールド)	Taiyō Fujii	Kodansha
2019	World Insurance (ワールド・インシュランス) (3 books)	Katsuie Shibata	Seikaisha Fictions, Kodansha
2019	Landscape and the Summer Theorem (ランドスケープと夏の定理, Landscape to Natsu no Teiri)	Yūya Takashima	Tokyo Sogensha
2019	The Second Job Is a Space Pirate (再就職先は宇宙海賊, Saishūshokusaki ha Utyū Kaizoku)	Kazuyuki Takami	Hayakawa Publishing
2019	The Cock Travels with the Weird Wok (厨師、怪しい鍋と旅をする, Chūshi, Ayashii Nabe to Tabi o Suru)	Umiyuri Katsuyama	Tokyo Sogensha
2020	Signposts to the Stars (天冥の標, Tenmei no Shirube series) (17 books)	Issui Ogawa	Hayakawa Publishing
2020	Long Dream of One Night/Human World (ヒト夜の永い夢, Hitoyo no Nagai Yume)	Katsuie Shibata	Hayakawa Publishing
2020	The Hermitage (宿借りの星, Yadokari no Hoshi)	Dempow Torishima	Tokyo Sogensha
2020	Tokyo Nipper (東京の子, Tokyo no Ko)	Taiyō Fujii	KADOKAWA
2020	The Ones Who Go Ahead (先をゆくもの達, Saki o Yukumonotachi)	Chōhei Kanbayashi	Hayakawa Publishing
2020	HELLO WORLD (HELLO WORLD)	Mado Nozaki	Shueisha
2020	Great Extinction Dinosaur Time Wars (大絶滅恐竜タイムウォーズ, Daizetsumetsu Kyoryu Time Wars)	Gengen Kusano	Hayakawa Publishing
2021	Military Logistics of Star System Izumo (星系出雲の兵站, Seikei Izumo no Heitan) (9 books)	Jōji Hayashi	Hayakawa Publishing
2021	One More Nuke (ワン・モア・ヌーク)	Taiyō Fujii	Shinchosha
2021	I Didn't Know the End (その果てを知らず, Sono Hate wo Shirazu)	Taku Mayumura	Kodansha
2021	Titan (タイタン)	Mado Nozaki	Kodansha
2021	The Irregular at Magic High School (魔法科高校の劣等生, Mahōkakōkō no Rettōsei) (32 books)	Tsutomu Satō	KADOKAWA
2021	Ode to Joy (Museum Planet vol.3) (歓喜の歌 博物館惑星III, Kanki no Uta, Hakubutsukan Wakusei 3)	Hiroe Suga	Hayakawa Publishing
2021	The Horse of Shuri (首里の馬, Shuri no Uma)	Haneko Takayama	Shinchosha
2021	The Complete Manual of How to Get One Billion Yen by Artificial Intelligence (人工知能で10億ゲットする完全犯罪マニュアル, Jinkōchinō de 10oku get suru kanzen hanzai manual)	Jinzō Takeda	Hayakawa Publishing
2021	Rail Wars! (Rail Wars!) (20 books)	Takumi Toyoda	Sōgeisha & Jitsugyō no Nihonsha
2022	Irina: The Vampire Cosmonaut (月とライカと吸血姫, Tsuki to Raika to Nosferatu) (7 books)	Keisuke Makino	Gagaga Bunko, Shogakukan
2022	Man Kind (マン・カインド)	Taiyō Fujii	S-F Magazine, Hayakawa Publishing
2022	A Situation Beyond Statistics (統計外事態, Tōkeigai Jitai)	Yūri Shibamura	Hayakawa Publishing
2022	Space Battleship Yamato: Dawn Chapter, Aquarius Algorithm (宇宙戦艦ヤマト 黎明篇 アクエリアス・アルゴリズム, Uchuu Senkan Yamato: Reimei-hen Aquarius Algorithm)	Yūya Takashima	KADOKAWA
2022	What Will You Be Doing at the End? Can I See You Just One More Time? (終末なにしてますか？ もう一度だけ、会えますか？, Shūmatsu Nani Shitemasu ka? Mō Ichido dake, Aemasu ka?) (11 books)	Akira Kareno	Sneaker Bunko, KADOKAWA
2022	The Youngest Princess in Blue (蒼衣の末姫, Sōi no Suehime)	Mitsuhiro Monden	Tokyo Sogensha
2022	JAGAE Eccentric Legend of Oda Nobunaga (JAGAE織田信長伝奇行, JAGAE Oda Nobunaga Denkikou)	Baku Yumemakura	Shodensha
2022	Kiryū Police: White Bone Road (機龍警察 白骨街道, Kiryū Keisatsu: Hakkotsu Kaidō)	Ryōe Tsukimura	Hayakawa Publishing
2023	Protocol of Humanity (プロトコル・オブ・ヒューマニティ)	Satoshi Hase	Hayakawa Publishing
2023	Dainihon Teikoku no Ginga (大日本帝国の銀河) (5 books)	Jōji Hayashi	Hayakawa Publishing
2023	Star Shaker (スターシェイカー)	Rokudo Ningen	Hayakawa Publishing
2023	The Tale of Marriage of the Carp Princess (鯉姫婚姻譚, Koihime Konin Tan)『鯉姫婚姻譚』	Tsubame Randō	Shinchosha
2023	Risō no Seijo? Zannen, Nise Seijo Desita! (理想の聖女？ 残念、偽聖女でした！) (4 books)	Kabedon Taikō	KADOKAWA
2023	Mushoku Tensei: Jobless Reincarnation (無職転生 ～異世界行ったら本気出す～, Mushoku Tensei: Isekai Ittara Honki dasu) (26 books)	Rifujin na Magonote	MF Books, KADOKAWA
2023	Map and Fist (地図と拳, Chizu to Kobushi)	Satoshi Ogawa	Shueisha
2023	Godzilla Singular Point (ゴジラ S.P ＜シンギュラポイント＞, Gozilla S. P. Singular Point)	Toh Enjoe	Shueisha
2024	Graf Zeppelin: The Airship of That Summer (グラーフ・ツェッペリン あの夏の飛行船)	Fumio Takano	Hayakawa Publishing
2024	Dai Dalos (ダイダロス, Dai Daros)	Tsutomu Shiozaki	Hayakawa Publishing
2024	Elephant Head (エレファントヘッド, Erefanto Heddo)	Tomoyuki Shirai	KADOKAWA
2024	Nufretung the Musician (奏で手のヌフレツン, Kanadete no Nufuretsun)	Denpo Torishima	Kawade Shobo Shinsha
2024	Dodo Bird & Lonely Bird (ドードー鳥と孤独鳥, Dōdō dori to kodoku dori)	Hiroto Kawabata	Kokushoukankokai
2024	Devour the Past (I am here) Beyond You (過去を喰らう (I am here) beyond you, Kakko wo Kurau (I am here) beyond you)	Rokudo Ningen	Ichijinsha
2024	Specimen Writer (標本作家, Hyohon Sakka)	Rakuyoshi Ogawa	Hayakawa Publishing
2024	Garden of Strange Diseases (奇病庭園, Kibyou Teien)	Mei Kawano	Bungeishunju
2025	Ascendance of a Bookworm (本好きの下剋上 司書になるためには手段を選んでいられません, Honzuki no Gekokujō)	Miya Kazuki	TO Books
2025	一億年のテレスコープ	Kōichi Harukure	Hayakawa Publishing
2025	Code Buddha (コード・ブッダ, Kōdo Budda)	Toh Enjoe	Bungeishunjū
2025	ここはすべての夜明けまえ	Kaii Mamiya	Hayakawa Publishing
2025	はじめてのゾンビ生活	Yuki Fuwa	Dengeki Bunko, KADOKAWA
2025	彗星を追うヴァンパイア	Yutaka Kōno	KADOKAWA
2025	知能浸蝕	Jōji Hayashi	Hayakawa Publishing
2026	Labeled Human (烙印の名はヒト, Rakuin no na wa hito)	Rokudo Ningen	Hayakawa Publishing

=== Best Japanese Short Story ===
Year	Work	Author
1970	"Full Nelson" (フル・ネルソン)	Yasutaka Tsutsui
1971	"Vitamin" (ビタミン)	Yasutaka Tsutsui
1972	"The Letter on the White Wall Is Beautiful at Sunset" (白壁の文字は夕日に映える, Shirakabe no Moji wa Yūhi ni Haeru)	Yoshio Aramaki
1973	"Crystal Star Cluster" (結晶星団, Kesshō Seidan)	Sakyo Komatsu
1974	"Everywhere But Japan Sinks" (日本以外全部沈没, Nippon Igai Zenbu Chinbotsu)	Yasutaka Tsutsui
1975	"God Hunting" (神狩り, Kamigari)	Masaki Yamada
1976	"Vomisa" (ヴォミーサ)	Sakyo Komatsu
1977	"Metamorphoses Archipelago" (メタモルフォセス群島, Metamorphoses Guntō)	Yasutaka Tsutsui
1978	"Gordian Knot" (ゴルディアスの結び目, Gordian no Musubime)	Sakyo Komatsu
1979	"Earth is Plain Yogurt" (地球はプレイン・ヨーグルト, Chikyū wa Plain Yogurt)	Shinji Kajio
1980	"The Dirty Pair's Great Adventures" (ダーティ・ペアの大冒険, Dirty Pair no Daibōken)	Haruka Takachiho
1981	"Green Requiem" (グリーン・レクイエム)	Motoko Arai
1982	"Neptune" (ネプチューン)	Motoko Arai
1983	"Languagemancer" (言葉使い師, Kotobazukaishi)	Chōhei Kanbayashi
1984	"Super Phoenix" (スーパー・フェニックス)	Chōhei Kanbayashi
1985	(No award)	
1986	"Lemon Pie, 0th Oyashiki Row" (レモンパイ、お屋敷横町0番地, Lemon Pie, Oyashiki Yokochō Zero Banchi)	Masahiro Noda
1987	"Martian Railroad Nineteen" (火星鉄道一九)	Kōshū Tani
1988	"The Symphony at the Mountain Top" (山の上の交響楽, Yama no Ue no Kōkyō-gaku)	Norio Nakai
1989	"The Day of Jellyfish" (くらげの日, Kurage no Hi)	Jin Kusakami
1990	"Aqua Planet" (アクア・プラネット)	Mariko Ōhara
1991	"The Boarlion Who Suffered Upper Botte" (上段の突きを喰らう猪獅子, Jōdan no Tsuki o Kurau Inoshishi)	Baku Yumemakura
1992	"Dinosaur Laurentiis's Vision" (恐竜ラウレンティスの幻視, Kyōryū Laurentiis no Genshi)	Shinji Kajio
1993	"Freckled Figure" (そばかすのフィギュア, Sobakasu no Figure)	Hiroe Suga
1994	"Kuruguru Wirepuller" (くるぐる使い, Kuruguru Tsukai)	Kenji Ōtsuki
1995	"Resentment Zigzig of Nonoko" (のの子の復讐ジグジグ, Nonoko no Fukushū Zigzig)	Kenji Ōtsuki
1996	"Experience Points in a Summer" (ひと夏の経験値, Hitonatsu no Keikenchi)	Kō Hiura
1997	"Dieting Equitation" (ダイエットの方程式, Diet no Hōteishiki)	Jin Kusakami
1998	"Independence Day in Osaka (Capitalism, Even Without Love)" (インディペンデンス・デイ・イン・オオサカ（愛はなくとも資本主義）, Independence Day in Ōsaka (Ai wa Nakutomo Shihonshugi))	Mariko Ōhara
1999	"The Terrorist in Dawn" (夜明けのテロリスト, Yoake no Terrorist)	Hiroyuki Morioka
2000	"Usurper of the Sun" (太陽の簒奪者, Taiyō no Sandatsusha)	Hōsuke Nojiri
2001	"Ashibiki Daydream" (あしびきデイドリーム)	Shinji Kajio
2002	"Even Koubou of the Galactic Empire Makes Mistakes" (銀河帝国の弘法も筆の誤り, Ginga Teikoku no Kōbō mo Fude no Ayamari)	Hirofumi Tanaka
2003	"I'm Missile" (おれはミサイル, Ore wa Missile)	Mizuhito Akiyama
2004	"Author Unknown/Undead" (黄泉びと知らず, Yomibito Shirazu)	Shinji Kajio
2005	"The Emblematized Power" (象られた力, Katadorareta Chikara)	Hirotaka Tobi
2006	"The Man Who Drifted" (漂った男, Tadayotta Otoko)	Issui Ogawa
2007	"A Pipe Dream and Spider's Thread" (大風呂敷と蜘蛛の糸, Ōburoshiki to Kumo no Ito)	Hōsuke Nojiri
2008	"Silent Flyby" (沈黙のフライバイ, Chinmoku no Flyby)	Hōsuke Nojiri
2009	"Pia-Pia Douga at the South Poll" (南極点のピアピア動画, Nankyokuten no Pia Pia Dōga)	Hōsuke Nojiri
2010	"Autogenic Dreaming: Interview with the Columns of Clouds" (自生の夢, Jisei no Yume)	Hirotaka Tobi
2011	"An Evil Creature Which Was Loved by King Arisuma" (アリスマ王の愛した魔物, Arisuma Ō no Aishita Mamono)	Issui Ogawa
2012	"The Singing Submarine and Pia-Pia Douga" (歌う潜水艦とピアピア動画, Utau Sensuikan to Pia Pia dōga)	Hōsuke Nojiri
2013	"Collective Unconscious Now," (いま集合的無意識を、, Ima Shūgōteki Muishiki o,)	Chōhei Kanbayashi
2014	"The Men Who Make Stars" (星を創る者たち, Hoshi o Tsukuru Monotachi)	Kōshū Tani
2015	"Sea Fingers" (海の指, Umi no Yubi)	Hirotaka Tobi
2016	"Tatara Island Again" (多々良島ふたたび, Tatarajima Futatabi)	Hiroshi Yamamoto
2016	"The Man Who Made the Cast of Monster Rukusubigura's Foot" (怪獣ルクスビグラの足型を取った男, Kaijū Rukusubigura no Ashigata o Totta Otoko)	Hirofumi Tanaka
2017	"Last and First Idol" (最後にして最初のアイドル, Saigo ni shite Saisho no Idol)	Gengen Kusano
2018	"A Usage Example of VR technology in Su Tribe in Yunnan State" (雲南省スー族におけるVR技術の使用例, Yunnan Shō Sū zoku ni okeru VR Gijutsu no Shiyōrei)	Katsuie Shibata
2019	"Dark Voice Actor" (暗黒声優, Ankoku Seiyū)	Gengen Kusano
2020	"Unseen Moon" (不見の月, Mizu no Tsuki)	Hiroe Suga
2021	"Orbital Christmas" (オービタル・クリスマス)	Haruna Ikezawa, based on the movie by Mitsuyasu Sakai
2021	"American Buddha" (アメリカン・ブッダ)	Katsuie Shibata
2022	"How to Beat SF Writers" (SF作家の倒し方, SF Sakka no Taoshikata)	Satoshi Ogawa
2023	"The Sagacious Stags" (法治の獣, Houchi no Kemono)	Koichi Harukure
2024	"Kaiju Within" (わたしたちの怪獣, Watashitachi no Kaijū)	Mikihiko Hisanaga
2025	"That Time Tokyo's Circle Line Reincarnated into the Largest Ring Collider." (山手線が転生して加速器になりました。, Yamanotesen ga Tensei shite Kasokuki ni Narimashita.)	Yuri Matsuzaki
2026	"Tokitoki Channel: How to Make Nonexistent Weather" (ときときチャンネル ない天気作ってみた, Tokitoki Channel Nai Tenki Tsukuttemita)	Iori Miyazawa

=== Best Translated Long Work ===
* Winners and joint winners + No winner selected

Year	Work	Author(s)	Translator(s)	Publisher or publication
1970	The Crystal World	J. G. Ballard	Yasuo Nakamura	Tokyo Sogensha
1971	The Andromeda Strain	Michael Crichton	Hisashi Asakura	Hayakawa Publishing
1972	Nightwings	Robert Silverberg	Takako Satō	Hayakawa Publishing
1973	The Sirens of Titan	Kurt Vonnegut, Jr.	Hisashi Asakura	Hayakawa Publishing
1974	Dune	Frank Herbert	Tetsu Yano	Hayakawa Publishing
1975	Up the Line	Robert Silverberg	Yasuo Nakamura	Tokyo Sogensha
1976	...And Call Me Conrad	Roger Zelazny	Fusa Obi	Hayakawa Publishing
1977	The Dragon Masters	Jack Vance	Hisashi Asakura	Hayakawa Publishing
1978	I Will Fear No Evil	Robert A. Heinlein	Tetsu Yano	Hayakawa Publishing
1979	Ringworld	Larry Niven	Rei Kozumi	Hayakawa Publishing
1980	Rendezvous with Rama	Arthur C. Clarke	Hiroshi Minamiyama	Hayakawa Publishing
1981	Inherit the Stars	James P. Hogan	Hiroaki Ike	Tokyo Sogensha
1982	The Genesis Machine	James P. Hogan	Hiroaki Ike	Tokyo Sogensha
1983	Dragon's Egg	Robert L. Forward	Akira Yamataka	Hayakawa Publishing
1984	The Garments of Caean	Barrington J. Bayley	Wataru Fuyukawa	Hayakawa Publishing
1985	The Zen Gun	Barrington J. Bayley	Akinobu Sakai	Hayakawa Publishing
1986	Elric saga	Michael Moorcock	Hitoshi Yasuda	Hayakawa Publishing
1986	Elric saga	Michael Moorcock	Akinobu Sakai	Hayakawa Publishing
1987	Neuromancer	William Gibson	Hisashi Kuroma	Hayakawa Publishing
1988	Norstrilia	Cordwainer Smith	Hisashi Asakura	Hayakawa Publishing
1989	Footfall	Larry Niven	Akinobu Sakai	Tokyo Sogensha
1989	Footfall	Jerry Pournelle	Akinobu Sakai	Tokyo Sogensha
1990	Collision with Chronos	Barrington J. Bayley	Nozomi Ohmori	Tokyo Sogensha
1991	The Uplift War	David Brin	Akinobu Sakai	Hayakawa Publishing
1992	The McAndrew Chronicles	Charles Sheffield	Akinobu Sakai	Tokyo Sogensha
1993	Tau Zero	Poul Anderson	Hisashi Asakura	Tokyo Sogensha
1994	Entoverse	James P. Hogan	Hiroaki Ike	Tokyo Sogensha
1995	Hyperion	Dan Simmons	Akinobu Sakai	Hayakawa Publishing
1996	The Fall of Hyperion	Dan Simmons	Akinobu Sakai	Hayakawa Publishing
1996	Timelike Infinity	Stephen Baxter	Kazuko Onoda	Hayakawa Publishing
1996	King of Morning, Queen of Day	Ian McDonald	Yoshimichi Furusawa	Hayakawa Publishing
1996	The Renegades of Pern	Anne McCaffrey	Fusa Obi	Hayakawa Publishing
1996	Voyage to the Red Planet	Terry Bisson	Tōru Nakamura	Hayakawa Publishing
1996	Doomsday Book	Connie Willis	Nozomi Ohmori	Hayakawa Publishing
1996	A Fire Upon the Deep	Vernor Vinge	Naoya Nakahara	Tokyo Sogensha
1996	Dead Girls	Richard Calder	Mamoru Masuda	Treville
1997	End of an Era	Robert J. Sawyer	Masayuki Uchida	Hayakawa Publishing
1997	The Memory of Whiteness	Kim Stanley Robinson	Masayuki Uchida	Tokyo Sogensha
1997	The Einstein Intersection	Samuel R. Delany	Norio Itō	Hayakawa Publishing
1997	Twistor	John Cramer	Rei Kozumi	Hayakawa Publishing
1997	Twistor	John Cramer	Ayako Ogiso	Hayakawa Publishing
1997	The Hacker and the Ants	Rudy Rucker	Nozomi Ohmori	Hayakawa Publishing
1997	The Vor Game	Lois McMaster Bujold	Ayako Ogiso	Tokyo Sogensha
1997	Mother of Storms	John Barnes	Naoya Nakahara	Hayakawa Publishing
1997	The Color of Disaster	Amy Thomson	Kazue Tanaka	Hayakawa Publishing
1998	Fallen Angels	Larry Niven	Osamu Asai	Tokyo Sogensha
1998	Fallen Angels	Jerry Pournelle	Osamu Asai	Tokyo Sogensha
1998	Fallen Angels	Michael F. Flynn	Osamu Asai	Tokyo Sogensha
1998	Sunglasses After Dark	Nancy A. Collins	Yōko Miki	Hayakawa Publishing
1998	Jumper	Steven Gould	Shigeyuki Kude	Hayakawa Publishing
1998	Desolation Road	Ian McDonald	Yoshimichi Furusawa	Hayakawa Publishing
1998	Feersum Endjinn	Ian M. Banks	Mamoru Masuda	Hayakawa Publishing
1998	Little, Big	John Crowley	Katsumasa Suzuki	Kokusho Kankōkai
1998	Moving Mars	Greg Bear	Kazuko Onoda	Hayakawa Publishing
1998	The Terminal Experiment	Robert J. Sawyer	Masayuki Uchida	Hayakawa Publishing
1999	The Time Ships	Stephen Baxter	Naoya Nakahara	Hayakawa Publishing
1999	Red Mars	Kim Stanley Robinson	Yutaka Ōshima	Tokyo Sogensha
1999	Dydeetown World	F. Paul Wilson	Hisashi Asakura	Hayakawa Publishing
1999	The Bohr Maker	Linda Nagata	Naoya Nakahara	Hayakawa Publishing
1999	Wielkość urojona	Stanisław Lem	Kazuo Hasemi	Kokusho Kankōkai
1999	Wielkość urojona	Stanisław Lem	Mitsuyoshi Numano	Kokusho Kankōkai
1999	Wielkość urojona	Stanisław Lem	Masahiko Nishi	Kokusho Kankōkai
1999	When Worlds Collide	Philip Wylie	Tatsuo Satō	Tokyo Sogensha
1999	When Worlds Collide	Edwin Balmer	Tatsuo Satō	Tokyo Sogensha
1999	Slow River	Nicola Griffith	Yōko Miki	Hayakawa Publishing
1999	Snow Crash	Neal Stephenson	Masamichi Higurashi	ASCII Corporation
2000	Kirinyaga	Mike Resnick	Masayuki Uchida	Hayakawa Publishing
2000	Endymion / The Rise of Endymion	Dan Simmons	Akinobu Sakai	Hayakawa Publishing
2000	Starplex	Robert J. Sawyer	Masayuki Uchida	Hayakawa Publishing
2000	One of Us	Michael Marshall Smith	Yooichi Shimada	Sony Magazines
2000	Quarantine	Greg Egan	Makoto Yamagishi	Tokyo Sogensha
2000	Forever Peace	Joe Haldeman	Naoya Nakahara	Tokyo Sogensha
2000	Permutation City	Greg Egan	Makoto Yamagishi	Hayakawa Publishing
2000	The Immortality Option	James P. Hogan	Rei Kozumi	Tokyo Sogensha
2001	Frameshift	Robert J. Sawyer	Masayuki Uchida	Hayakawa Publishing
2001	The Positronic Man	Isaac Asimov	Tōru Nakamura	Tokyo Sogensha
2001	The Positronic Man	Robert Silverberg	Tōru Nakamura	Tokyo Sogensha
2001	Ender's Shadow	Orson Scott Card	Kazue Tanaka	Hayakawa Publishing
2001	Simulacron-3	Daniel F. Galouye	Tōru Nakamura	Tokyo Sogensha
2001	The Light of the Other Days	Arthur C. Clarke	Wataru Fuyukawa	Hayakawa Publishing
2001	The Light of the Other Days	Stephen Baxter	Wataru Fuyukawa	Hayakawa Publishing
2001	All Tomorrow's Parties	William Gibson	Hisashi Asakura	Kadokawa Shoten
2001	Darwin's Radio	Greg Bear	Nozomi Ohmori	Sony Magazines
2001	Barrayar	Lois McMaster Bujold	Ayako Ogiso	Tokyo Sogensha
2001	The Moon and the Sun	Vonda N. McIntyre	Yōko Miki	Hayakawa Publishing
2002	There and Back Again	Pat Murphy	Hisashi Asakura	Hayakawa Publishing
2002	Children of the Mind	Orson Scott Card	Kazue Tanaka	Hayakawa Publishing
2002	Orgasmachine	Ian Watson	Yutaka Ōshima	Core Magazine
2002	Green Mars	Kim Stanley Robinson	Yutaka Ōshima	Tokyo Sogensha
2002	The Player of Games	Ian M. Banks	Hisashi Asakura	Kadokawa Shoten
2002	Cetaganda	Lois McMaster Bujold	Ayako Ogiso	Tokyo Sogensha
2002	The Diamond Age	Neal Stephenson	Masamichi Higurashi	Hayakawa Publishing
2002	Flashforward	Robert J. Sawyer	Masayuki Uchida	Hayakawa Publishing
2002	Brightness Reef	David Brin	Akinobu Sakai	Hayakawa Publishing
2002	All the Weyrs of Pern	Anne McCaffrey	Fusa Obi	Hayakawa Publishing
2003	Illegal Alien	Robert J. Sawyer	Masayuki Uchida	Hayakawa Publishing
2003	Cryptonomicon	Neal Stephenson	Naoya Nakahara	Hayakawa Publishing
2003	Gloriana	Michael Moorcock	Keisuke Ōtaki	Tokyo Sogensha
2003	Davy	Edgar Pangborn	Hiroaki Endō	Fusosha Publishing
2003	Freeware	Rudy Rucker	Nozomi Ohmori	Hayakawa Publishing
2003	The Telling	Ursula K. Le Guin	Fusa Obi	Hayakawa Publishing
2003	Passage	Connie Willis	Nozomi Ohmori	Sony Magazines
2003	A Deepness in the Sky	Vernor Vinge	Naoya Nakahara	Tokyo Sogensha
2003	The Reefs of Earth	R.A. Lafferty	Kiichirō Yanashita	Kawade Shobō Shinsha
2003	Thraxas	Martin Scott	Masayuki Uchida	Hayakawa Publishing
2004	Heaven's Reach	David Brin	Akinobu Sakai	Hayakawa Publishing
2004	The Impossible Bird	Patrick O'Leary	Naoya Nakahara	Hayakawa Publishing
2004	Leviathan	James Byron Huggins	Tōru Nakamura	Tokyo Sogensha
2004	The Drive-In	Joe R. Lansdale	Kōji Onoue	Tokyo Sogensha
2004	The Other Wind	Ursula K. Le Guin	Masako Shimizu	Iwanami Shoten
2004	Das Jesus Video	Andreas Eschbach	Yoshio Hirai	Hayakawa Publishing
2004	Ethan of Athos	Lois McMaster Bujold	Ayako Ogiso	Tokyo Sogensha
2004	Fastwalker	Jacques Vallée	Tsuyoki Isobe	Tokyo Sogensha
2005	Distress	Greg Egan	Makoto Yamagishi	Tokyo Sogensha
2005	To Say Nothing of the Dog	Connie Willis	Nozomi Ohmori	Hayakawa Publishing
2005	The Prestige	Christopher Priest	Yoshimichi Furusawa	Hayakawa Publishing
2005	The Fifth Head of Cerberus	Gene Wolfe	Kiichirō Yanashita	Kokusho Kankōkai
2005	The Physiognomy	Jeffrey Ford	Yūko Yamao	Kokusho Kankōkai
2005	The Physiognomy	Jeffrey Ford	Mizuto Kanehara	Kokusho Kankōkai
2005	The Physiognomy	Jeffrey Ford	Akemi Tanigaki	Kokusho Kankōkai
2005	The Embedding	Ian Watson	Hiroo Yamagata	Kokusho Kankōkai
2005	Down the Bright Way	Robert Reed	Norio Itō	Hayakawa Publishing
2006	Diaspora	Greg Egan	Makoto Yamagishi	Hayakawa Publishing
2006	Revelation Space	Alastair Reynolds	Naoya Nakahara	Hayakawa Publishing
2006	Space Chantey	R.A. Lafferty	Kiichirō Yanashita	Kokusho Kankōkai
2006	Tuf Voyaging	George R. R. Martin	Akinobu Sakai	Hayakawa Publishing
2006	The Neanderthal Parallax trilogy	Robert J. Sawyer	Masayuki Uchida	Hayakawa Publishing
2006	Venus Plus X	Theodore Sturgeon	Yuzuru Ōkubo	Kokusho Kankōkai
2006	The Swords of Lankhmar	Fritz Leiber	Hisashi Asakura	Tokyo Sogensha
2007	Mortal Engines	Philip Reeve	Rei Anno	Tokyo Sogensha
2007	Singularity Sky	Charles Stross	Hiroshi Kaneko	Hayakawa Publishing
2007	Mars Crossing	Geoffrey A. Landis	Kazuko Onoda	Hayakawa Publishing
2007	Ilium	Dan Simmons	Akinobu Sakai	Hayakawa Publishing
2007	The Collapsium	Wil McCarthy	Yooichi Shimada	Hayakawa Publishing
2007	Chasm City	Alastair Reynolds	Naoya Nakahara	Hayakawa Publishing
2008	Brightness Falls from the Air	James Tiptree, Jr.	Hisashi Asakura	Hayakawa Publishing
2008	Olympos	Dan Simmons	Akinobu Sakai	Hayakawa Publishing
2008	The Separation	Christopher Priest	Yoshimichi Furusawa	Hayakawa Publishing
2008	Old Man's War	John Scalzi	Masayuki Uchida	Hayakawa Publishing
2008	Kiln People	David Brin	Akinobu Sakai	Hayakawa Publishing
2008	Camouflage	Joe Haldeman	Tsukasa Kaneko	Hayakawa Publishing
2008	The Golden Oecumene trilogy	John C. Wright	Masamichi Higurashi	Hayakawa Publishing
2008	Golem^{100}	Alfred Bester	Sachie Watanabe	Kokusho Kankōkai
2008	The Atrocity Archives	Charles Stross	Hiroshi Kaneko	Hayakawa Publishing
2009	Spin	Robert Charles Wilson	Takeshi Mogi	Tokyo Sogensha
2009	The Ghost Brigades	John Scalzi	Masayuki Uchida	Hayakawa Publishing
2009	Redemption Ark	Alastair Reynolds	Naoya Nakahara	Hayakawa Publishing
2009	Light	M. John Harrison	Naoya Nakahara	Kokusho Kankōkai
2009	The Urth of the New Sun	Gene Wolfe	Hiroyuki Okabe	Hayakawa Publishing
2009	Sun of Suns	Karl Schroeder	Naoya Nakahara	Hayakawa Publishing
2009	Seeker	Jack McDevitt	Hiroshi Kaneko	Hayakawa Publishing
2010	The Last Colony	John Scalzi	Masayuki Uchida	Hayakawa Publishing
2010	Accelerando	Charles Stross	Akinobu Sakai	Hayakawa Publishing
2010	Rainbows End	Vernor Vinge	Hideko Akao	Tokyo Sogensha
2010	Perdido Street Station	China Miéville	Masamichi Higurashi	Hayakawa Publishing
2010	Probability trilogy	Nancy Kress	Tsukasa Kaneko	Hayakawa Publishing
2010	The Yiddish Policemen's Union	Michael Chabon	Toshiyuki Kurohara	Shinchosha
2011	Eifelheim	Michael F. Flynn	Yooichi Shimada	Tokyo Sogensha
2011	World War Z	Max Brooks	Akio Hamano	Bungeishunjū
2011	Small Change trilogy	Jo Walton	Takeshi Mogi	Tokyo Sogensha
2011	El Mapa del Tiempo	Felix J. Palma	Maki Miyazaki	Hayakawa Publishing
2011	Hunter's Run	George R. R. Martin	Akinobu Sakai	Hayakawa Publishing
2011	Hunter's Run	Gardner Dozois	Akinobu Sakai	Hayakawa Publishing
2011	Hunter's Run	Daniel Abraham	Akinobu Sakai	Hayakawa Publishing
2011	Un Lun Dun	China Miéville	Masayuki Uchida	Kawade Shobō Shinsha
2011	Genesis	Bernard Beckett	Kazuko Onoda	Hayakawa Publishing
2012	The Windup Girl	Paolo Bacigalupi	Kazue Tanaka	Hayakawa Publishing
2012	The Windup Girl	Paolo Bacigalupi	Hiroshi Kaneko	Hayakawa Publishing
2012	The City & the City	China Miéville	Masamichi Higurashi	Hayakawa Publishing
2012	The Chronoliths	Robert Charles Wilson	Takeshi Mogi	Tokyo Sogensha
2012	Dhalgren	Samuel R. Delany	Yuzuru Ōkubo	Kokusho Kankōkai
2012	Little Brother	Cory Doctorow	Hiroshi Kaneko	Hayakawa Publishing
2012	Millennium People	J. G. Ballard	Mamoru Masuda	Tokyo Sogensha
2013	The Android's Dream	John Scalzi	Masayuki Uchida	Hayakawa Publishing
2013	The Quantum Thief	Hannu Rajaniemi	Akinobu Sakai	Hayakawa Publishing
2013	Vortex	Robert Charles Wilson	Takeshi Mogi	Tokyo Sogensha
2013	Blackout	Connie Willis	Nozomi Ohmori	Hayakawa Publishing
2013	Leviathan trilogy	Scott Westerfeld	Miyuki Kobayashi	Hayakawa Publishing
2014	Blindsight	Peter Watts	Yooichi Shimada	Tokyo Sogensha
2014	Incandescence	Greg Egan	Makoto Yamagishi	Hayakawa Publishing
2014	Serpent's Egg	R. A. Lafferty	Hiroshi Inoue	Seishinsha
2014	Embassytown	China Miéville	Masayuki Uchida	Hayakawa Publishing
2014	Kraken	China Miéville	Masamichi Higurashi	Hayakawa Publishing
2014	The Islanders	Christopher Priest	Yoshimichi Furusawa	Hayakawa Publishing
2014	All Clear	Connie Willis	Nozomi Ohmori	Hayakawa Publishing
2015	The Martian	Andy Weir	Kazuko Onoda	Hayakawa Publishing
2015	Pathfinder	Orson Scott Card	Naoya Nakahara	Hayakawa Publishing
2015	Ready Player One	Ernest Cline	Makiko Ikeda	SB Creative
2015	The Dervish House	Ian McDonald	Masaya Shimokusu	Tokyo Sogensha
2015	Redshirts	John Scalzi	Masayuki Uchida	Hayakawa Publishing
2015	Among Others	Jo Walton	Takeshi Mogi	Tokyo Sogensha
2016	Ancillary Justice	Ann Leckie	Hideko Akao	Tokyo Sogensha
2016	Zendegi	Greg Egan	Makoto Yamagishi	Hayakawa Publishing
2016	Ack-Ack Macaque	Gareth L. Powell	Kazuyo Misumi	Tokyo Sogensha
2016	The Water Knife	Paolo Bacigalupi	Naoya Nakahara	Hayakawa Publishing
2016	The Violent Century	Lavie Tidhar	Takeshi Mogi	Tokyo Sogensha
2016	Vulcan's Hammer	Philip K. Dick	Tatsuo Satō	Tokyo Sogensha
2017	United States of Japan	Peter Tieryas	Naoya Nakahara	Hayakawa Publishing
2017	Jack Vance Treasury 1: Magnus Ridolph	Jack Vance	Hisashi Asakura	Kokusho Kankōkai (Japanese original collection)
2017	Jack Vance Treasury 1: Magnus Ridolph	Jack Vance	Akinobu Sakai	Kokusho Kankōkai (Japanese original collection)
2017	The Grace of Kings	Ken Liu	Yoshimichi Furusawa	Hayakawa Publishing
2017	Roderick	John Sladek	Kiichirō Yanashita	Kawade Shobō Shinsha
2017	The First Fifteen Lives of Harry August	Claire North	Hiromi Amagai	KADOKAWA / Kadokawa Shoten
2017	Imperial Radch trilogy	Ann Leckie	Hideko Akao	Tokyo Sogensha
2017	Enchanted Night	Steven Millhauser	Motoyuki Shibata	Hakusuisha
2018	Sleeping Giants	Sylvain Neuvel	Chiori Sada	Tokyo Sogensha
2018	The Adjacent	Christopher Priest	Yoshimichi Furusawa	Hayakawa Publishing
2018	The Adjacent	Christopher Priest	Yōko Miki	Hayakawa Publishing
2018	A Borrowed Man	Gene Wolfe	Akinobu Sakai	Hayakawa Publishing
2018	My Real Children	Jo Walton	Takeshi Mogi	Tokyo Sogensha
2018	Blue Mars	Kim Stanley Robinson	Yutaka Ōshima	Tokyo Sogensha
2018	The History of Soviet Fantastika (История советской фантастики)	Roman Arbitman (Роман Арбитман) as Rustam Katz (Рустам Кац)	Hiroaki Umemura	Kyōwakoku
2018	Jack Vance Treasury 3: Space Opera	Jack Vance	Hisashi Asakura	Kokusho Kankōkai (Japanese original collection)
2018	Jack Vance Treasury 3: Space Opera	Jack Vance	Rō Shiraishi	Kokusho Kankōkai (Japanese original collection)
2019	Mecha Samurai Empire	Peter Tieryas	Naoya Nakahara	Hayakawa Publishing
2019	Artemis	Andy Weir	Kazuko Onoda	Hayakawa Publishing
2019	We Are Legion	Dennis E. Taylor	Hiroshi Kaneko	Hayakawa Publishing
2019	Provenance	Ann Leckie	Hideko Akao	Tokyo Sogensha
2019	Waking Gods	Sylvain Neuvel	Chiori Sada	Tokyo Sogensha
2019	Six Wakes	Mur Lafferty	Takeshi Mogi	Tokyo Sogensha
2019	Seveneves	Neal Stephenson	Masamichi Higurashi	Hayakawa Publishing
2020	The Three-Body Problem (三体)	Liu Cixin (劉慈欣)	Tōya Tachihara	Hayakawa Publishing
2020	The Three-Body Problem (三体)	Liu Cixin (劉慈欣)	Nozomi Ohmori	Hayakawa Publishing
2020	The Three-Body Problem (三体)	Liu Cixin (劉慈欣)	Sakura Mitsuyoshi	Hayakawa Publishing
2020	The Three-Body Problem (三体)	Liu Cixin (劉慈欣)	Chai Wang	Hayakawa Publishing
2020	The Long Way to a Small, Angry Planet	Becky Chambers	Yōko Hosomi	Tokyo Sogensha
2020	The Paradox Men	Charles L. Harness	Tōru Nakamura	Takeshobo
2020	Jade City	Fonda Lee	Mayumi Ohtani	Hayakawa Publishing
2020	Only Human	Sylvain Neuvel	Chiori Sada	Tokyo Sogensha
2020	A Man Lies Dreaming	Lavie Tidhar	Shingo Oshino	Takeshobo
2020	The Murderbot Diaries [All Systems Red, Artificial Condition, Rogue Protocol, and Exit Strategy]	Martha Wells	Naoya Nakahara	Tokyo Sogensha
2021	The Dark Forest (三体II: 黒暗森林)	Liu Cixin	Tōya Tachihara	Hayakawa Publishing
2021	The Dark Forest (三体II: 黒暗森林)	Liu Cixin	Nozomi Ohmori	Hayakawa Publishing
2021	The Dark Forest (三体II: 黒暗森林)	Liu Cixin	Kaori Uehara	Hayakawa Publishing
2021	The Dark Forest (三体II: 黒暗森林)	Liu Cixin	Kō Tomari	Hayakawa Publishing
2021	All the Birds in the Sky	Charlie Jane Anders	Izumi Ichida	Tokyo Sogensha
2021	The Strange Case of the Alchemist's Daughter	Theodora Goss	Jun Suzuki	Hayakawa Publishing
2021	The Strange Case of the Alchemist's Daughter	Theodora Goss	Fumiyo Harashima	Hayakawa Publishing
2021	The Strange Case of the Alchemist's Daughter	Theodora Goss	Mayumi Ohtani	Hayakawa Publishing
2021	The Strange Case of the Alchemist's Daughter	Theodora Goss	Izumi Ichida	Hayakawa Publishing
2021	The Fifth Season	N.K. Jemisin	Kazuko Onoda	Tokyo Sogensha
2021	The Calculating Stars	Mary Robinette Kowal	Akinobu Sakai	Hayakawa Publishing
2021	Ninefox Gambit	Yoon Ha Lee	Hideko Akao	Tokyo Sogensha
2021	The Psychology of Time Travel	Kate Mascarenhas	Takeshi Mogi	Tokyo Sogensha
2021	Embers of War	Gareth L. Powell	Kazuyo Misumi	Tokyo Sogensha
2021	Avengers of the Moon	Allen Steele	Tōru Nakamura	Tokyo Sogensha
2022	Project Hail Mary	Andy Weir	Kazuko Onoda	Hayakawa Publishing
2022	Network Effect	Martha Wells	Naoya Nakahara	Tokyo Sogensha
2022	The Man with the Compound Eyes (複眼人)	Wu Ming-yi (呉明益)	Satoshi Oguriyama	KADOKAWA
2022	The Fated Sky	Mary Robinette Kowal	Akinobu Sakai	Hayakawa Publishing
2022	Death's End (三体III: 死神永生)	Liu Cixin	Nozomi Ohmori	Hayakawa Publishing
2022	Death's End (三体III: 死神永生)	Liu Cixin	Chai Wang	Hayakawa Publishing
2022	Death's End (三体III: 死神永生)	Liu Cixin	Sakura Mitsuyoshi	Hayakawa Publishing
2022	Death's End (三体III: 死神永生)	Liu Cixin	Kō Tomari	Hayakawa Publishing
2022	No Enemy But Time	Michael Bishop	Yutaka Ōshima	Takeshobo
2022	This Is How You Lose the Time War	Amal El-Mohtar and Max Gladstone	Kazuko Yamada	Hayakawa Publishing
2022	Children of Time	Adrian Tchaikovsky	Masayuki Uchida	Takeshobo
2023	Foundation trilogy	Isaac Asimov	Yasuko Kaji	Tokyo Sogensha
2023	Ninth Step Station	Malka Older, Curtis C. Chen, Jacqueline Koyanagi, and Fran Wilde	Kana Yoshimoto / Yui Nogami / Sumiko Kudo / Yuka Tachikawa	Takeshobo
2023	NSA - Nationales Sicherheits-Amt	Andreas Eshbach	Momoko Akasaka	Hayakawa Publishing
2023	L'anomalie	Hervé Le Tellier	Kaori Katō	Hayakawa Publishing
2023	The Three-Body Problem X (三体X 観想之宙)	Baoshu	Nozomi Ohmori / Chai Wang / Sakura Mitsuyoshi	Hayakawa Publishing
2023	The Last Astronaut	David Wellinton	Naoya Nakahara	Hayakawa Publishing
2023	The Three-Body Problem Zero (三体0 球状閃電)	Liu Cixin	Nozomi Ohmori	Hayakawa Publishing
2024	The Kaiju Preservation Society	John Scalzi	Masayuki Uchida	Hayakawa Publishing
2024	Braking Day	Adam Oyebanji	Tsukasa Kaneko	Hayakawa Publishing
2024	Iron Widow	Xiran Jay Zhao	Naoya Nakahara	Hayakawa Publishing
2024	Civilizations	Laurent Binet	Akemi Tachibana	Tokyo Sogensha
2024	Greenhouse at the End of the World (지구 끝의 온실)	Kim Choyeop (김초엽)	Kang Bang Hwa	Hayakawa Publishing
2024	Drunk on All Your Strange New Words	Eddie Robson	Takeshi Mogi	Tokyo Sogensha
2024	Mickey7	Edward Ashton	Mayumi Ohtani	Hayakawa Publishing
2025	System Collapse	Martha Wells	Naoya Nakahara	Tokyo Sogensha
2025	Space Opera	Catherynne M. Valente	Kazuko Onoda	Hayakawa Publishing
2025	Neom	Lavie Tidhar	Takeshi Mogi	Tokyo Sogensha
2025	Hospital (医院)	Han Song	Kazuko Yamada	Hayakawa Publishing
2025	Titanium Noir	Nick Harkaway	Akinobu Sakai	Hayakawa Publishing
2025	A Master of Djinn	P. Djèlí Clark	Yasuko Kaji	Tokyo Sogensha
2025	The Red Arrow	William Brewer	Motomi Ueno	Hayakawa Publishing
2026	Eversion	Alastair Reynolds	Naoya Nakahara	Tokyo Sogensha
2026	Babel	R. F. Kuang	Yoshimichi Furusawa	Tokyo Sogensha
2026	The Cautious Traveller's Guide to the Wastelands	Sarah Brooks	Yasuko Kawano	Hayakawa Publishing
2026	The Book of Elsewhere	Keanu Reeves, China Miéville	Rei Anno, Masayuki Uchida	Kawade Shobō Shinsha
2026	The Tusks of Extinction	Ray Nayler	Hiroshi Kaneko	Tokyo Sogensha
2026	Some Desperate Glory	Emily Tesh	Hiroshi Kaneko	Hayakawa Publishing
2026	The Paradox Hotel	Rob Hart	Takeshi Mogi	Tokyo Sogensha
2026	Shambling Towards Hiroshima	James Morrow	Masayuki Uchida	Takeshobo

=== Best Translated Short Story ===
* Winners and joint winners + No winner selected

Year	Work	Author(s)	Translator(s)	Publisher or publication
1970	"The Squirrel Cage"	Thomas M. Disch	Norio Itō	SF Magazine
1971	"The Poems"	Ray Bradbury	Norio Itō	SF Magazine
1972	"The Blue Bottle"	Ray Bradbury	Norio Itō	SF Magazine
1973	"The Black Ferris"	Ray Bradbury	Norio Itō	Dark Carnival, Hayakawa Publishing
1974	"A Meeting with Medusa"	Arthur C. Clarke	Norio Itō	SF Magazine
1975	"Eurema's Dam"	R. A. Lafferty	Norio Itō	SF Magazine
1976	"Wet Paint"	A. Bertram Chandler	Masahiro Noda	SF Magazine
1977	"Rozprawa"	Stanisław Lem	Dan Fukami	SF Magazine
1978	(No award)			
1979	"Inconstant Moon"	Larry Niven	Rei Kozumi	SF Magazine
1980	(No award)			
1981	"A Relic of the Empire"	Larry Niven	Rei Kozumi	SF Magazine
1982	"The Brave Little Toaster"	Thomas M. Disch	Hisashi Asakura	SF Magazine
1983	"Nightflyers"	George R. R. Martin	Hitoshi Yasuda	SF Magazine
1984	"Unicorn Variation"	Roger Zelazny	Jun Kazami	SF Magazine
1985	(No award)			
1986	(No award)			
1987	"Press Enter■"	John Varley	Jun Kazami	SF Magazine
1988	"The Only Neat Thing To Do"	James Tiptree, Jr.	Hisashi Asakura	SF Magazine
1989	"Eye for Eye"	Orson Scott Card	Mariko Fukamachi	SF Magazine
1990	"Think Blue, Count Two"	Cordwainer Smith	Norio Itō	SF Magazine
1991	"Schrödinger's Kitten"	George Alec Effinger	Hisashi Asakura	SF Magazine
1992	"Tango Charlie and Foxtrot Romeo"	John Varley	Hisashi Asakura	SF Magazine
1993	"Groaning Hinges of the World"	R. A. Lafferty	Hisashi Asakura	SF Magazine
1994	"Tangents"	Greg Bear	Akinobu Sakai	Tangents: Greg Bear's New Collection, Hayakawa Publishing
1995	"The Planet Named Shayol"	Cordwainer Smith	Norio Itō	The Planet Named Shayol, Hayakawa Publishing
1996	"Robot Visions"	Isaac Asimov	Norio Itō	SF Magazine
1997	"Heads"	Greg Bear	Kazuko Onoda	SF Magazine
1998	"The Death of Captain Future"	Allen Steele	Masahiro Noda	SF Magazine
1999	"This Year's Class Picture"	Dan Simmons	Yooichi Shimada	SF Magazine
2000	"Out of the Everywhere"	James Tiptree, Jr.	Norio Itō	Out of the Everywhere, Hayakawa Publishing
2001	"Oceanic"	Greg Egan	Makoto Yamagishi	SF Magazine
2002	"Story of Your Life"	Ted Chiang	Shigeyuki Kude	SF Magazine
2002	"Reasons to be Cheerful"	Greg Egan	Makoto Yamagishi	20-seiki SF vol. 6 [The 20th Century SF vol. 6], Kawade Shobō Shinsha
2003	"Luminous"	Greg Egan	Makoto Yamagishi	90-nendai SF Kessaku-sen: the Second Volume [The Best SF of Nineties: the Second Volume], Hayakawa Publishing
2004	"Hell Is the Absence of God"	Ted Chiang	Makoto Yamagishi	Story of Your Life, Hayakawa Publishing
2005	"And Now the News..."	Theodore Sturgeon	Nozomi Ohmori	SF Magazine
2006	"The Human Front"	Ken MacLeod	Yooichi Shimada	SF Magazine
2007	"The Astronaut from Wyoming"	Adam-Troy Castro	Hisashi Asakura	SF Magazine
2007	"The Astronaut from Wyoming"	Jerry Oltion	Hisashi Asakura	SF Magazine
2008	"Weather"	Alastair Reynolds	Naoya Nakahara	Great Wall of Mars, Hayakawa Publishing
2009	"The Merchant and the Alchemist's Gate"	Ted Chiang	Nozomi Ohmori	SF Magazine
2010	"Dark Integers"	Greg Egan	Makoto Yamagishi	SF Magazine
2011	"Carry the Moon in My Pocket"	James Lovegrove	Tōru Nakamura	The Astronaut from Wyoming: The Best Space Exploration SF, Hayakawa Publishing (Japanese original anthology)
2011	"Exhalation"	Ted Chiang	Nozomi Ohmori	SF Magazine
2011	"The Ray-Gun: A Love Story"	James Alan Gardner	Hiroshi Kaneko	SF Magazine
2011	"Crystal Nights"	Greg Egan	Makoto Yamagishi	SF Magazine
2011	"Pump Six"	Paolo Bacigalupi	Naoya Nakahara	SF Magazine
2011	"The Man in the Mirror"	Geoffrey A. Landis	Kazuko Onoda	SF Magazine
2011	"The Beloved Time of Their Lives"	Ian Watson	Nozomi Ohmori	SF Magazine
2011	"The Beloved Time of Their Lives"	Robert Quaglia	Nozomi Ohmori	SF Magazine
2012	"The Lifecycle of Software Objects"	Ted Chiang	Nozomi Ohmori	SF Magazine
2012	"The Pelican Bar"	Karen Joy Fowler	Wataru Ishigame	SF Magazine
2012	"The Gambler"	Paolo Bacigalupi	Yoshimichi Furusawa	SF Magazine
2012	"The People of Sand and Slag"	Paolo Bacigalupi	Naoya Nakahara	SF Magazine
2012	"Troika"	Alastair Reynolds	Naoya Nakahara	SF Magazine
2012	"The Little Goddess"	Ian McDonald	Hitomi Nakamura	SF Magazine
2013	"Pocketful of Dharma"	Paolo Bacigalupi	Hiroshi Kaneko	Pump Six and Other Stories, Hayakawa Publishing
2013	"The Emperor of Mars"	Allen M. Steele	Yoshimichi Furusawa	SF Magazine
2013	"The Lady Who Plucked Red Flowers Beneath the Queen's Window"	Rachel Swirsky	Eiko Kakinuma	SF Magazine
2013	"The Tamarisk Hunter"	Paolo Bacigalupi	Naoya Nakahara	Pump Six and Other Stories, Hayakawa Publishing
2013	"With Unclean Hands"	Adam-Troy Castro	Kazuko Onoda	SF Magazine, Hayakawa Publishing
2013	"Vishnu at the Cat Circus"	Ian McDonald	Masaya Shimokusu	Cyberabad Days, Hayakawa Publishing
2014	"The Paper Menagerie"	Ken Liu	Yoshimichi Furusawa	SF Magazine
2014	"Palimpsest"	Charles Stross	Hiroshi Kaneko	SF Magazine
2014	"Vacuum Lad"	Stephen Baxter	Satoru Yaguchi	SF Magazine
2014	"Christopher Raven"	Theodora Goss	Jun Suzuki	SF Magazine
2014	"The Man Who Bridged the Mist"	Kij Johnson	Kazuyo Misumi	SF Magazine
2014	"Final Exam"	Megan Akenberg	Jun Suzuki	SF Magazine
2015	"The Girl-Thing Who Went Out for Sushi"	Pat Cadigan	Yooichi Shimada	SF Magazine
2015	"The Negation"	Christopher Priest	Yoshimichi Furusawa	SF Magazine
2015	"Hunter Come Home"	Richard McKenna	Tōru Nakamura	Black Destroyer and Other Stories, Tokyo Sogensha (Japanese original anthology)
2015	"Water"	Ramez Naam	Naoya Nakahara	SF Magazine
2015	"For Want of a Nail"	Mary Robinette Kowal	Fumiyo Harashima	SF Magazine
2015	"Year of the Rat"	Qiufan Chen	Naoya Nakahara	SF Magazine
2015	"War 3.01"	Keith Brooke	Masato Naruniwa	SF Magazine
2016	"Good Hunting"	Ken Liu	Yoshimichi Furusawa	The Paper Menagerie and Other Stories, Hayakawa Publishing (Japanese original collection)
2016	"The Road of Needles"	Caitlín R. Kiernan	Jun Suzuki	SF Magazine
2016	"White Sin, Now"	Tanith Lee	Izumi Ichida	SF Magazine
2016	"Mask"	Stanisław Lem	Kōichi Hisayama	Fantstyczny Lem: Antologia według czytelników, Kokusho Kankōkai
2016	"Relays and Roses"	Gene Wolfe	Takao Miyawaki	Gene Wolfe's Book of Days, Kokusho Kankōkai (Japanese original collection)
2016	"Alfred's Ark"	Jack Vance	Tōru Nakamura	The Bookshop and Other Stories, Tokyo Sogensha (Japanese original anthology)
2016	"Beautiful Boys"	Theodora Goss	Jun Suzuki	SF Magazine
2017	"Backward, Turn Backward"	James Tiptree, Jr.	Kazuko Onoda	Crown of Stars, Hayakawa Publishing
2017	"Simulacrum"	Ken Liu	Yoshimichi Furusawa	SF Magazine
2017	"Seventh Sight"	Greg Egan	Makoto Yamagishi	SF Magazine
2017	"The Day the World Turned Upside Down"	Thomas Olde Heuvelt	Jun Suzuki	SF Magazine
2017	"The Guiding Nose of Ulfänt Banderōz"	Dan Simmons	Akinobu Sakai	SF Magazine
2017	"The Deathbird"	Harlan Ellison	Norio Itō	The Deathbird and Other Stories, Hayakawa Publishing (Japanese original collection)
2018	"Folding Beijing" (北京折叠)	Hao Jingfang (郝景芳)	Mayumi Ōtani	SF Magazine
2018	"Folding Beijing" (北京折叠)	Hao Jingfang (郝景芳)	Ken Liu (as the English translator)	SF Magazine
2018	"The New Guys Always Work Overtime"	David Erik Nelson	Jun Suzuki	SF Magazine
2018	"An Advanced Reader's Picture Book of Comparative Cognition"	Ken Liu	Izumi Ichida	Memories of My Mother, Hayakawa Publishing (Japanese original collection)
2018	"Healing Benjamin"	Dennis Danvers	Makoto Yamagishi	Neko ha Utyū de Marukunaru [Cats Curling Up in Space], Takeshobo (Japanese original anthology)
2018	"Travel Diary"	Alfred Bester	Akinobu Sakai	Adam and No Eve, Tokyo Sogensha (Japanese original collection)
2018	"Knotting Grass, Holding Ring"	Ken Liu	Yoshimichi Furusawa	Memories of My Mother, Hayakawa Publishing (Japanese original collection)
2019	"The Circle" (円)	Liu Cixin (劉慈欣)	Naoya Nakahara	Invisible Planets, Hayakawa Publishing
2019	"The Circle" (円)	Liu Cixin (劉慈欣)	Ken Liu (as the English translator)	Invisible Planets, Hayakawa Publishing
2019	"The Martian Obelisk"	Linda Nagata	Naoya Nakahara	SF Magazine
2019	"Liar's House"	Lucius Shepard	Masayuki Uchida	The Man Who Painted the Dragon Griaule, Takeshobo (Japanese original collection)
2019	"Monster in the Midest"	Julio Toro San Martin	Yoshio Nomura	FUNGI: The Second Colony, P-vine ele-king books
2019	"Převychování"	Jan Barda	Kiyomi Hirano	Czech SF Collection, Heibonsha (Japanese original collection)
2019	"Between Nine and Eleven"	Adam Roberts	Masayuki Uchida	SF Magazine
2019	"Cybertank vs. Megazillus"	Timothy J. Gawne	Akinobu Sakai	SF Magazine
2020	"Uncanny Valley"	Greg Egan	Makoto Yamagishi	Bit Players and Other Stories, Hayakawa Publishing (Japanese original collection)
2020	"Anxiety Is the Dizziness of Freedom"	Ted Chiang	Nozomi Ohmori	Exhalation, Hayakawa Publishing
2020	"Omphalos"	Ted Chiang	Nozomi Ohmori	Exhalation, Hayakawa Publishing
2020	"Memorials"	Aliette de Bodard	Yutaka Ohshima	The Tea Master and the Detective, Takeshobo (Japanese original collection)
2020	"Bit Players"	Greg Egan	Makoto Yamagishi	Bit Players and Other Stories, Hayakawa Publishing (Japanese original collection)
2020	"The Caretaker"	Ken Liu	Mayumi Ohtani	The Reborn and Other Stories, Hayakawa Publishing (Japanese original collection)
2020	"The Secret Life of Bots"	Suzanne Palmer	Naoya Nakahara	SF Magazine
2021	"Zima Blue"	Alastair Reynolds	Naoya Nakahara	Best SF of the 2000s, Hayakawa Publishing (Japanese original anthology)
2021	"Our Science Fiction World"	Baoshu (宝树)	Kōsaku Ai	SF Magazine
2021	"This is Not the Way Home"	Greg Egan	Makoto Yamagishi	SF Magazine
2021	"About My Space Hero"	Cho-yeop Kim (김초엽)	Bang-hwa Kan	If We Cannot Move at the Speed of Light, Hayakawa Publishing
2021	"The Weight of Memories"	Liu Cixin	Kō Tomari	SF Magazine
2021	"The Snow of Jinyang" (晋阳三尺雪)	Zhang Ran (張冉)	Naoya Nakahara	Broken Stars: Contemporary Chinese Science Fiction in Translation, Hayakawa Publishing
2021	"My Crappy Autumn"	Nitay Peretz	Masami Uekusa	Zion's Fiction: A Treasury of Israeli Speculative Literature, Takeshobo
2021	"The Syllables of Silence"	Zhou Wen (昼温)	Masami Asada	The Stairway of the Time, Shinkigensha (Japanese original anthology)
2022	"The One With the Interstellar Group Consciousnesses"	James Alan Gardner	Chiori Sada	Federations, Tokyo Sogensha
2022	"Yakiniku Planet" (烤肉自助星)	Liang Qingshan (梁清散)	Keita Kojima	Chinese&American Enigmatic SF, Hakusuisha (Japanese original anthology)
2022	"Mother Tongues"	S. Qiouyi Lu	Umiyuri Katsuyama	Shimi no Techō vol.02, Tokyo Sogensha
2022	"Nomad"	Karin Lowachee	Naoya Nakahara	Armored, Tokyo Sogensha
2022	"The Man Who Ended History: A Documentary"	Ken Liu	Yoshimichi Furusawa	Spring of the Universe, Hayakawa Publishing (Japanese original collection)
2022	"Power Armor: A Love Story"	David Barr Kirtley	Naoya Nakahara	Armored, Tokyo Sogensha
2022	"The King of Time" (时间之王)	Baoshu (宝树)	Kōsaku Ai	SF Magazine
2022	"A Witch's Guide to Escape: A Practical Compendium of Portal Fantasies"	Alix E. Harrow	Fumiyo Harashima	SF Magazine
2023	"Sooner Or Later Everything Falls Into The Sea"	Sarah Pinsker	Izumi Ichida	Sooner Or Later Everything Falls Into The Sea, Takeshobo
2023	"The Wandering Earth"	Liu Cixin	Nozomi Ohmori, Masako Furuichi	The Wandering Earth, KADOKAWA
2023	"Polished Performance"	Alastair Reynolds	Naoya Nakahara	Made to Order, Tokyo Sogensha
2023	"Go. Now. Fix."	Timons Esaias	Masato Naruniwa	SF Magazine
2023	"Unfamiliar Gods"	Adam-Troy Castro & Judi B. Castro	Kazuko Onoda	Cosmic Powers, Tokyo Sogensha
2023	"Running Red"	Su Wanwen	Toya Tachihara	Chinese Female SF Writers Anthology: Running Red, Chuō Kōronsha
2023	"Eichmann in Alaska"	Chang Kang-myoung	Kanae Kira	Highly Personal Superpowers, Hayakawa Publishing
2023	"Fandom for Robots"	Vina Jie-Min Prasad	Chiori Sada	SF Magazine
2023	"Signal"	L. D. Lewis	Umiyuri Katsuyama	VirtualGorilla
2024	"Solidity"	Greg Egan	Makoto Yamagishi	SF Magazine
2024	"Šest měsíců, in ulna"	Jaroslav Veis	Kiyomi Hirano	The Short Story Collection of Czech SF 2, Heibonsha
2024	"Sleepover"	Alastair Reynolds	Naoya Nakahara	Robot Uprisings, Tokyo Sogensha
2024	"The Long Way Home"	Fred Saberhagen	Tōru Nakamura	The Best of Space Exploration SF, Tokyo Sogensha
2024	"Exo-skeleton Town"	Jeffrey Ford	Akemi Tanigaki	The Last Triangle, Tokyo Sogensha
2025	"The Portrait of a Survivor, Observed from the Water"	Yukimi Ogawa	Umiyuri Katsuyama	SF Magazine
2025	"Pellargonia: A Letter to the Journal of Imaginary Anthropology"	Theodora Goss	Jun Suzuki	SF Magazine
2025	"Open House on Haunted Hill"	John Wiswell	Hisashi Kujirai	SF Magazine
2025	"The Time Migration" (时间移民)	Liu Cixin	Nozomi Ohmori, Sakura Mitsuyoshi, Wang Chai	SF Magazine
2025	"The World's Wife"	Ng Yi-Sheng	Hisashi Kujirai	SF Magazine
2025	"A Psalm for the Wild-Built"	Becky Chambers	Yōko Hosomi	A Psalm for the Wild-Built, Tokyo Sogensha
2025	"Crisis Actors"	Greg Egan	Makoto Yamagishi	Tomorrow's Parties: Life in the Anthropocene, Tokyo Sogensha
2026	"After Zero"	Greg Egan	Makoto Yamagishi	SF Magazine
2026	"Boutout"	Wole Talabi	Masato Naruniwa	SF Magazine
2026	"Hémisphères"	Tristan Garcia	Kei Takahashi	7 romans, Kawade Shobō Shinsha
2026	"Two Truths and a Lie"	Sarah Pinsker	Izumi Ichida	Lost Places, Takeshobo
2026	"Five Views of the Planet Tartarus"	Rachael K. Jones	Chiori Sada	Shimi no Techo vol.24, Tokyo Sogensha
2026	"Fear of Seeing" (看的恐惧)	Han Song (韩松)	Tōya Tachihara	SF Magazine

=== Best Dramatic Presentation ===
* Winners and joint winners + No winner selected (Japan) Denotes a Japanese work

Year	Work	Media type
1970	The Prisoner	TV series
1970	Charly	film
1970	A Thousand and One Nights (Japan)	animated film
1971	UFO	TV series
1971	Marooned	film
1971	Beneath the Planet of the Apes	film
1972	The Andromeda Strain	film
1973	A Clockwork Orange	film
1974	Soylent Green	film
1975	Space Battleship Yamato (Japan)	animated TV series
1976	Star (Japan)	theatrical play
1977	(no award)	
1978	Solaris	film
1979	Star Wars	film
1980	Alien	film
1980	Silent Running	film
1980	Galaxy Express 999 (Japan)	animated film
1980	The Man Who Stole the Sun (Japan)	film
1980	Superman	film
1980	Nanase Once More (Japan)	TV series
1980	Halloween	film
1980	The Lord of the Rings	animated film
1980	The China Syndrome	film
1980	Heaven Can Wait	film
1981	The Empire Strikes Back	film
1981	Mobile Suit Gundam (Japan)	animated TV series
1981	Star Trek: The Motion Picture	film
1981	Cosmos: A Personal Voyage	TV program
1981	Virus (Japan)	film
1981	Toward the Terra (Japan)	animated film
1981	The Final Countdown	film
1981	Panorama Solar System (Japan)	TV program
1981	Doraemon: Nobita's Dinosaur (Japan)	animated film
1981	All That Jazz	film
1982	(no award)	
1982	Excalibur	film
1982	Time After Time	film
1982	Altered States	film
1982	Superman II	film
1982	Somewhere in Time	film
1982	Scanners	film
1982	Escape from New York	film
1982	Flash Gordon	film
1982	Samurai Reincarnation (Japan)	film
1982	Stalker	film
1983	Blade Runner	film
1984	The Dark Crystal	film
1984	Crusher Joe (Japan)	animated film
1984	The Girl Who Leapt Through Time (Japan)	film
1984	Time Bandits	film
1984	Urusei Yatsura: Only You (Japan)	animated film
1984	Return of the Jedi	film
1984	Star Trek II: The Wrath of Khan	film
1984	Airplane II: The Sequel	film
1984	Okay, My Friend (Japan)	film
1984	Ginga Hyōryū Vifam (Japan)	animated TV series
1985	Nausicaä of the Valley of the Wind (Japan)	animated film
1985	Gremlins	film
1985	Urusei Yatsura 2: Beautiful Dreamer (Japan)	animated film
1985	Ghostbusters	film
1985	NHK Special: "The World's Scientists Predict - Earth after Nuclear War" (Japan)	TV program
1985	Bye-Bye Jupiter (Japan)	film
1985	The Return of Godzilla (Japan)	film
1985	Armored Trooper VOTOMS (Japan)	animated TV series
1985	Ginga Hyōryū Vifam (Japan)	animated TV series
1985	Macross: Do You Remember Love? (Japan)	animated film
1986	Back to the Future	film
1986	The Terminator	film
1986	Night on the Galactic Railroad (Japan)	animated film
1986	Angel's Egg (Japan)	OVA
1986	Urusei Yatsura (Japan)	animated TV series
1986	Dune	film
1986	2010: The Year We Make Contact	film
1986	Ladyhawke	film
1986	Sukeban Deka (Japan)	TV series
1986	Dirty Pair (Japan)	animated TV series
1986	Yamata no Orochi no Gyakushū (Japan)	film
1986	Electric Dreams	film
1986	Super Mario Bros. (Japan)	video game
1986	Fight! Iczer One	OVA
1986	Mobile Suit Zeta Gundam (Japan)	animated TV series
1986	Kyodai Ken Byclosser (Japan)	TV series
1986	The Tower of Druaga (Japan)	video game
1987	Brazil	film
1987	Stonehenge (trilogy) (Japan)	theatrical play
1987	The Red Spectacles (Japan)	film
1987	Aliens	film
1987	Vampire Hunter D (Japan)	animated film
1987	Super Kabuki: "Yamato Takeru" (Japan)	theatrical play
1988	Royal Space Force: The Wings of Honneamise (Japan)	animated film
1988	Dragon Quest (I and II) (Japan)	video game
1988	The Fly	film
1988	Tokyo Blackout (Japan)	film
1988	The Witches of Eastwick	film
1988	Innerspace	film
1988	Star Trek IV: The Voyage Home	film
1988	Little Shop of Horrors	film
1989	My Neighbor Totoro (Japan)	animated film
1989	RoboCop	film
1989	Star Trek: The Next Generation: "Encounter at Farpoint"	TV series episode
1989	Spaceballs	film
1989	Willow	film
1989	Tokyo: The Last Megalopolis (Japan)	film
1989	Akira (Japan)	animated film
1989	Mobile Police Patlabor (Japan)	OVA series
1989	Summer Vacation 1999 (Japan)	film
1989	Shigatsu Kaidan (Japan)	film
1989	Dragon Quest III (Japan)	video game
1990	Gunbuster (Japan)	OVA series
1991	NHK Special: A Galactic Odyssey (Japan)	TV program
1991	Back to the Future Part III	film
1991	Total Recall	film
1991	Godzilla vs. Biollante (Japan)	film
1991	Ghost	film
1991	Tokyo Heaven (Japan)	film
1991	La Belle Fille Masquée Poitrine (Japan)	TV series
1992	Terminator 2: Judgment Day	film
1992	Edward Scissorhands	film
1992	Godzilla vs. King Ghidorah (Japan)	film
1992	Otaku no Video (Japan)	OVA
1992	Armored Police Metal Jack (Japan)	animated TV series
1992	Nadia: The Secret of Blue Water (Japan)	animated TV series
1993	Mama wa Shōgaku 4 Nensei (Japan)	animated TV series
1993	Star Trek VI: The Undiscovered Country	film
1993	Bram Stoker's Dracula	film
1993	Godzilla vs. Mothra (Japan)	film
1993	Naked Lunch (Japan)	film
1993	Romancing SaGa (Japan)	video game
1993	Freejack	film
1993	Batman Returns	film
1994	Jurassic Park	film
1994	Patlabor 2: The Movie (Japan)	animated film
1994	The Ultraseven I Loved (Japan)	TV series
1994	Torneko no Daibōken: Fushigi no Dungeon (Japan)	video game
1994	Forever Young	film
1994	NIGHT HEAD (Japan)	TV series
1995	Zeiram 2 (Japan)	film
1995	Dirty Pair Flash (Japan)	OVA series
1995	Demolition Man	film
1995	Armored Trooper VOTOMS: Brilliantly Shining Heresy (Japan)	OVA series
1995	Star Trek: The Next Generation: "Unification"	TV series episode
1995	The Nightmare Before Christmas	animated film
1995	Timecop	film
1995	The Girl Who Leapt Through Time (Japan)	TV series
1996	Gamera: Guardian of the Universe (Japan)	film
1996	Apollo 13	film
1996	Ghost in the Shell (Japan)	animated film
1996	Johnny Mnemonic	film
1996	Star Trek Generations	film
1996	Village of the Damned	film
1996	The Mask	film
1996	Memories (Japan)	animated film
1997	Gamera 2: Attack of Legion (Japan)	film
1997	The Outer Limits: "The Sandkings"	TV series episode
1997	Toy Story	animated film
1997	12 Monkeys	film
1997	Escape from L.A.	film
1997	The Vision of Escaflowne (Japan)	animated TV series
1997	Choukou Senshi Changéríon (Japan)	TV series
1997	4th Super Robot Wars Scramble (Japan)	video game
1998	Ultraman Tiga (Japan)	TV series
1998	Revolutionary Girl Utena (Japan)	animated TV series
1998	Contact	film
1998	The Fifth Element	film
1998	Mars Attacks!	film
1998	Star Trek: First Contact	film
1998	Independence Day	film
1998	The Lost World: Jurassic Park	film
1999	Martian Successor Nadesico: The Motion Picture – Prince of Darkness (Japan)	animated film
1999	Serial Experiments Lain (Japan)	animated TV series
1999	Generator Gawl (Japan)	animated TV series
1999	Ring (Japan)	film
1999	Starship Troopers (United States)	film
1999	Alien Resurrection (United States)	film
1999	Deep Impact (United States)	film
1999	Nanase Once More (Japan)	TV series
1999	Trigun (Japan)	animated TV series
2000	Cowboy Bebop (Japan)	animated TV series
2000	Space Pirate Mito (Japan)	animated TV series
2000	Red Dwarf (United Kingdom)	TV series
2000	Gamera 3: Revenge of Iris (Japan)	film
2000	Star Wars: Episode I – The Phantom Menace (United States)	film
2000	Star Trek: Insurrection (United States)	film
2000	Digimon Adventure (Japan)	animated short film
2000	The Matrix (United States)	film
2001	Gunparade March (Japan)	video game
2001	The Iron Giant (United States)	animated film
2001	Bicentennial Man (United States)	film
2001	X-Men (United States)	film
2001	Sakuya Yōkai-den (Japan)	film
2001	Juvenile (Japan)	film
2001	Digimon Adventure: Our War Game! (Japan)	animated short film
2001	October Sky (United States)	film
2001	Blood: The Last Vampire (Japan)	animated film
2001	Infinite Ryvius (Japan)	animated TV series
2002	Kamen Rider Kuuga (Japan)	TV series
2002	Avalon (Japan)	film
2002	Princess Arete (Japan)	animated film
2002	Cowboy Bebop: The Movie (Japan)	animated film
2002	Shingu: Secret of the Stellar Wars (Japan)	animated TV series
2002	Galaxy Quest (United States)	film
2002	Crayon Shin-chan: Fierceness That Invites Storm! The Adult Empire Strikes Back (Japan)	animated film
2002	Transparent: Tribute to a Sad Genius (Japan)	film
2002	Z.O.E. Dolores, I (Japan)	animated TV series
2003	Voices of a Distant Star (Japan)	OVA short
2003	Star Wars: Episode II – Attack of the Clones (United States)	film
2003	RahXephon (Japan)	animated TV series
2003	The Lord of the Rings: The Fellowship of the Ring (United States)	film
2003	Kamen Rider Agito (Japan)	TV series
2003	Haibane Renmei (Japan)	animated TV series
2003	Shaolin Soccer (China)	film
2004	The Lord of the Rings: The Two Towers (United States)	film
2004	Stellvia (Japan)	animated TV series
2004	RahXephon: Pluralitas Concentio (Japan)	animated film
2004	NHK Drama Love Poem: "Like an Angel" (Japan)	TV series
2004	The League of Extraordinary Gentlemen (United States)	film
2004	Dokkoida?! (Japan)	animated TV series
2004	Overman King Gainer (Japan)	animated TV series
2005	Planetes (Japan)	animated TV series
2005	The Place Promised in Our Early Days (Japan)	animated film
2005	Tetsujin 28-gō (Japan)	animated TV series
2005	Ghost in the Shell 2: Innocence (Japan)	animated film
2005	Fullmetal Alchemist (Japan)	animated TV series
2005	The Lord of the Rings: The Return of the King (United States)	film
2005	Astro Boy (Japan)	animated TV series
2006	Tokusou Sentai Dekaranger (Japan)	TV series
2006	Genesis of Aquarion (Japan)	animated TV series
2006	Lorelei: The Witch of the Pacific Ocean (Japan)	film
2006	Ghost in the Shell: S.A.C. 2nd GIG (Japan)	animated TV series
2006	Magical Girl Lyrical Nanoha A's (Japan)	animated TV series
2006	Pani Poni Dash! (Japan)	animated TV series
2007	The Girl Who Leapt Through Time (Japan)	animated film
2007	Zegapain (Japan)	animated TV series
2007	The Melancholy of Haruhi Suzumiya (Japan)	animated TV series
2007	Paprika (Japan)	animated film
2007	Nihon Igai Zenbu Chinbotsu (Japan)	film
2008	Den-noh Coil (Japan)	animated TV series
2008	Gurren Lagann (Japan)	animated TV series
2008	Transformers (United States)	film
2008	Oh! Edo Rocket (Japan)	animated TV series
2008	Pan's Labyrinth (Spain)	film
2008	Magical Girl Lyrical Nanoha Strikers (Japan)	animated TV series
2009	Macross Frontier (Japan)	animated TV series
2009	Real Drive (Japan)	animated TV series
2009	Kamen Rider Den-O (Japan)	TV series
2009	Code Geass: Lelouch of the Rebellion R2 (Japan)	animated TV series
2009	The Dark Knight (United States)	film
2009	Fireball (Japan)	animated TV series
2009	Library War (Japan)	animated TV series
2010	Summer Wars (Japan)	animated film
2010	Avatar (United States)	film
2010	Star Trek (United States)	film
2010	Watchmen (United States)	film
2010	Terminator Salvation (United States)	film
2010	Transformers: Revenge of the Fallen (United States)	film
2010	Fresh Pretty Cure! The Kingdom of Toys has Lots of Secrets!? (Japan)	animated film
2010	Jin (Japan)	TV series
2011	District 9 (United States) (New Zealand) (South Africa)	film
2011	The Tatami Galaxy (Japan)	animated TV series
2011	Kamen Rider W (Japan)	TV series
2011	Welcome to the Space Show (Japan)	animated film
2011	Samurai Sentai Shinkenger (Japan)	TV series
2011	Time Traveller: The Girl Who Leapt Through Time (Japan)	film
2011	Operation Space Dog (Japan)	TV series
2012	Puella Magi Madoka Magica (Japan)	animated TV series
2012	Paul (United States)	film
2012	Penguindrum (Japan)	animated TV series
2012	Steins;Gate (Japan)	animated TV series
2012	Tiger & Bunny (Japan)	animated TV series
2012	Real Steel	film
2013	Bodacious Space Pirates (Japan)	animated TV series
2013	Iron Sky (Finland)	film
2013	The Avengers (United States)	film
2013	009 Re:Cyborg (Japan)	animated film
2013	Giant God Warrior Appears in Tokyo (Japan)	short film
2013	Lagrange: The Flower of Rin-ne (Japan)	animated TV series
2013	Eureka Seven: AO (Japan)	animated TV series
2014	Pacific Rim	film
2014	Gargantia on the Verdurous Planet (Japan)	animated TV series
2014	Star Blazers: Space Battleship Yamato 2199 (Japan)	animated TV series
2014	Arpeggio of Blue Steel -Ars Nova- (Japan)	animated TV series
2014	Psycho-Pass (Japan)	animated TV series
2014	Gravity (United States)	film
2014	Patema Inverted (Japan)	animated film
2014	Girls und Panzer (Japan)	animated TV series
2015	Space Battleship Yamato 2199: Odyssey of the Celestial Ark (Japan)	animated film
2015	Expelled from Paradise (Japan)	animated film
2015	Space Dandy (Japan)	animated TV series
2015	Interstellar (United States)	film
2015	Big Hero 6 (United States)	animated film
2015	Kill la Kill (Japan)	animated TV series
2015	Mysterious Transfer Student (Japan)	TV series
2016	Girls und Panzer der Film (Japan)	animated film
2016	Mad Max: Fury Road (United States)	film
2016	Star Wars: The Force Awakens (United States)	film
2016	Chappie	film
2016	The Congress	film
2016	Wish Upon the Pleiades (Japan)	animated TV series
2016	The Empire of Corpses (Japan)	animated film
2016	Psycho-Pass: The Movie (Japan)	animated film
2017	Shin Godzilla (Japan)	film
2017	Your Name (Japan)	animated film
2017	Kabaneri of the Iron Fortress (Japan)	animated TV series
2017	Rogue One: A Star Wars Story (United States)	film
2017	Concrete Revolutio (Japan)	animated TV series
2017	Zegapain Adaptation (Japan)	animated film
2017	Look Who's Back (Germany)	film
2017	Kuromukuro (Japan)	animated TV series
2018	Kemono Friends (Japan)	animated TV series
2018	Arrival (United States)	film
2018	Blade Runner 2049 (United States)	film
2018	ID-0 (Japan)	animated TV series
2018	Kado: The Right Answer (Japan)	animated TV series
2018	Re:Creators (Japan)	animated TV series
2018	Kubo and the Two Strings (United States)	animated film
2018	Passengers (United States)	film
2018	Miss Peregrine's Home for Peculiar Children (United States)	film
2019	SSSS.Gridman (Japan)	animated TV series
2019	Ready Player One (United States)	film
2019	Cells at Work! (Japan)	animated TV series
2019	Beatless (Japan)	animated TV series
2019	Dragon Pilot: Hisone and Masotan (Japan)	animated TV series
2019	Planet With (Japan)	animated TV series
2019	Penguin Highway (Japan)	animated film
2019	Baahubali 2: The Conclusion (uncut version) (India)	film
2019	Pacific Rim: Uprising (United States)	film
2020	Astra Lost in Space (Japan)	animated TV series
2020	Hello World (Japan)	animated film
2020	Godzilla: King of the Monsters (United States)	film
2020	Promare (Japan)	animated film
2020	Weathering with You (Japan)	animated film
2020	13 Sentinels: Aegis Rim (Japan)	video game
2020	Fly Me to the Saitama (Japan)	film
2020	Shinkansen Henkei Robo Shinkalion the Movie: The Mythically Fast ALFA-X That Came From The Future (Japan)	animated film
2021	Ultraman Z (Japan)	TV series
2021	Deca-Dence (Japan)	animated TV series
2021	NHK Drama: Thus Spoke Kishibe Rohan (Japan)	TV series
2021	Keep Your Hands Off Eizouken! (Japan)	film
2021	Id – Invaded (Japan)	animated TV series
2021	BNA: Brand New Animal (Japan)	animated TV series
2021	Demon Slayer: Kimetsu no Yaiba – The Movie: Mugen Train (Japan)	animated film
2021	Pretty Cure Miracle Leap: A Wonderful Day with Everyone (Japan)	animated film
2021	Drifting Dragons (Japan)	animated TV series
2021	Project Dreams: How to Build Mazinger Z's Hangar (Japan)	film
2022	Godzilla Singular Point (Japan)	animated TV series
2022	Vivy: Fluorite Eye's Song (Japan)	animated TV series
2022	Knights of Sidonia: Love Woven in the Stars (Japan)	animated film
2022	Dune (Japan)	film
2022	Sing a Bit of Harmony (Japan)	animated film
2022	Evangelion: 3.0+1.0 Thrice Upon a Time (Japan)	animated film
2022	Japan Sinks: People of Hope	TV series
2022	The Door into Summer (Japan)	film
2023	Shin Ultraman (Japan)	film
2023	Lycoris Recoil (Japan)	animated TV series
2023	Taroman (Japan)	TV series
2023	Break of Dawn (Japan)	animated film
2023	The Orbital Children (Japan)	animated film
2023	Shinichi Hoshi's Strange and Wonderful Short Dramas (Japan)	TV series
2023	Summer Time Rendering (Japan)	animated TV series
2023	Suzume (Japan)	animated film
2023	What to Do with the Dead Kaiju? (Japan)	film
2023	Daicon Film's Return of Ultraman (Japan); HD remaster	short film
2024	Godzilla Minus One (Japan)	film
2024	16bit Sensation: Another Layer (Japan)	animated TV series
2024	River (Japan)	film
2024	Birth of Kitarō: The Mystery of GeGeGe (Japan)	animated film
2024	Gridman Universe (Japan)	animated film
2024	The Creator (United States)	film
2024	Spider-Man: Across the Spider-Verse (United States)	animated film
2024	M3GAN (United States)	film
2025	A Samurai in Time (Japan)	film
2025	Brave Bang Bravern! (Japan)	animated TV series
2025	Civil War (United States)	film
2025	Train to the End of the World (Japan)	animated TV series
2025	Dead Dead Demon's Dededede Destruction (Japan)	animated film
2025	Ohsama Sentai King-Ohger (Japan)	TV series
2025	Cells at Work! (Japan)	film
2026	Apocalypse Hotel (Japan)	animated TV series
2026	Milky Subway: The Galactic Limited Express (Japan)	animated TV series
2026	Kasei no Jo-oh (Japan)	TV series
2026	Taroman: Banpaku Daibakuhatsu (Japan)	film
2026	Mobile Suit Gundam GQuuuuuuX (Japan)	animated TV series
2026	Junk World (Japan)	film
2026	Lazarus (Japan)	animated TV series
2026	Zombie Land Saga: Yumeginga Paradise (Japan)	animated film

=== Best Comic ===
Year	Work	Author/Artist	Publisher or Publication
1978	Toward the Terra (地球へ..., Tera e...)	Keiko Takemiya	Gekkan Manga Shonen, since Jan 1977
1979	Absurdity Diary (不条理日記, Fujōri Nikki)	Hideo Azuma	Bessatsu Kisotengai No. 6, "SF Manga Compendium Part 2", Dec 1978
1980	Star Red (スター・レッド, Sutā Reddo)	Moto Hagio	Weekly Shōjo Comic, 1978 (No. 23) to 1979 (No. 3)
1980	Cobra (コブラ, Kobura)	Buichi Terasawa	Weekly Shōnen Jump, since 1978
1980	Legends of the Enchantress: Moon Dream (月夢—妖女伝説—, Getsumu -Yōjo Densetsu-)	Yukinobu Hoshino	Young Jump, 1979 (No. 5)
1980	Fireball (Fire-ball)	Katsuhiro Otomo	Action Deluxe, Jan 27, 1979 (No. 5)
1980	Juma (樹魔)	Wakako Mizuki	Bouquet, Dec 1979
1980	Methyl Metaphisik (メチル・メタフィジーク, Mechiru Metafijīku)	Hideo Azuma	SF Magazine, Oct 1979 - Jun 1980
1980	Absurdity Diary (不条理日記, Fujōri Nikki) (collected edition)	Hideo Azuma	Kisotengaisha; Kisotengai Comics
1980	Insane Nebula Chronicles (狂乱星雲記, Kyōran Seiun Ki)	Hideo Azuma	Comic Again, May - Nov 1979
1980	Doraemon (ドラえもん)	Fujiko Fujio	Shogakukan; Tentomushi Comics
1980	Ring ni Kakero (リングにかけろ)	Masami Kurumada	Shueisha; Jump Comics
1981	Densetsu (伝説)	Wakako Mizuki	Bouquet, May to June 1980
1981	Domu: A Child's Dream (童夢, Dōmu)	Katsuhiro Otomo	Action Deluxe, since Jan 19, 1980
1981	Patalliro! Stardust (パタリロ！スターダスト, Patariro! Sutādasuto)	Mineo Maya	Hakusensha; Hana to Yume Comics
1981	Lunatic (るなてっく, Runatekku)	Hideo Azuma	Gekiga Alice Oct 1979 - Apr 1980
1981	Anesa & Oji (アネサとオジ, Anesa to Oji)	Fumiko Takano	Manga Kisotengai SF Manga Daizenshuu No. 1, Apr 1980
1981	Star Wankers (スターアホーズ, Star Ahōzu)	Shintaro Koh	Kisotengai, Sept 1980
1981	City of Bliss (至福の街, Shihuku no Machi)	Jun Ishikawa	Manga Kisotengai SF Manga Daizenshuu No. 1, Apr 1980
1981	Katsuhiro Otomo's Nutritious! (大友克洋の栄養満点！, Ōtomo Katsuhiro no Eiyō Manten!)	Katsuhiro Otomo	Rocking On, May 1979 - May 1980.
1981	She...	Noma Sabea	Light Blue Page, Kisotengaisha
1981	Ship of Fools (阿呆船, Ahōsen)	Shio Satō	SF Manga Taizenshuu Part 4 No. 9, Jan 1980
1982	Already Feels Like War (気分はもう戦争, Kibun wa Mō Sensō)	Toshihiko Yahagi and Katsuhiro Otomo	Weekly Manga Action, Apr 1980 to Nov 1981
1982	The Mask of Ongoro (オンゴロの仮面, Ongoro no Kamen)	Daijiro Morohoshi	Akita Shoten; Shonen Champion Comics
1982	A, A′	Moto Hagio	Princess, Aug 1981
1982	Winter Planet (冬の惑星, Fuyu no Wakusei)	Yukinobu Hoshino	Kekkan Starlog, May/June 1981 issue
1982	The Mysterious Person Ackerman (怪人アッカーマン, Kaishin Akkaman)	Takako Nitta	Comic Gang and Bessatsu Manga Action
1982	Dream Garden (夢庭園, Yume Teien)	Akeru Toto	Kisotenkaisha
1982	Legend of the Flute Player (笛吹伝説, Usui Densetsu)	Mineko Yamada	Ryu, Mar and May 1981 issues
1982	The Promised Land (約束の地, Yakuzoku no Chi)	Jun Ishikawa	Kodansha; Young Magazine KC
1982	Tomorrow, Tomorrow, Tomorrow Again (明日も、明日も、また明日も, Ashita mo, Ashita mo, Mata Ashita mo)	Yōko Kondō	Kaisotengai, Jun 1981
1982	Dokkiri Doctor (どっきりドクター)	Fujihiko Hosono	Shogakukan; Shōnen Sunday Comics
1983	Silver Triangle (銀の三角, Gin no Sankaku)	Moto Hagio	SF Magazine, Dec 1980 to Jun 1982
1984	Domu: A Child's Dream (童夢, Dōmu)	Katsuhiro Otomo	Futabasha
1985	X + Y	Moto Hagio	Shogakukan
1986	Appleseed	Masamune Shirow	Kodansha
1987	Urusei Yatsura	Rumiko Takahashi	Shogakukan
1988	Kyūkyoku Chōjin R	Masami Yūki	Shogakukan
1989	Mermaid Saga	Rumiko Takahashi	Shogakukan
1990	So What?	Megumi Wakatsuki	Hakusensha
1991	Uchū Daizakka	Eiji Yokoyama	
1992	Yamataika	Yukinobu Hoshino	
1993	OZ	Natsumi Itsuki	Hakusensha
1994	Dai-Hon'ya	Miki Tori	
1994	Grant Leauvas Monogatari	Kyōko Shitō	
1995	Nausicaä of the Valley of the Wind	Hayao Miyazaki	Tokuma Shoten
1996	Parasyte	Hitoshi Iwaaki	Kodansha
1997	Ushio & Tora	Kazuhiro Fujita	Shogakukan
1998	SF Taishō	Miki Tori	
1999	Runnahime Hourouki	Eiji Yokoyama	
2000	Itihaasa	Wakako Mizuki	Shueisha
2001	Cardcaptor Sakura	Clamp	Kodansha
2002	Planetes	Makoto Yukimura	Kodansha
2003	Chronoeyes	Yūichi Hasegawa	Kodansha
2004	From Far Away	Kyōko Hikawa	Hakusensha
2005	Bremen II	Izumi Kawahara	Hakusensha
2006	Onmyōji	Reiko Okano	Hakusensha
2007	Yokohama Kaidashi Kikou	Hitoshi Ashinano	Kodansha
2008	20th Century Boys	Naoki Urasawa and Takashi Nagasaki	Shogakukan
2009	Trigun Maximum	Yasuhiro Nightow	Shōnen Gahōsha
2010	Pluto	Naoki Urasawa, Osamu Tezuka, Takashi Nagasaki, Macoto Tezka and Tezuka Productions	Shogakukan
2011	Fullmetal Alchemist	Hiromu Arakawa	Square Enix
2012	Mobile Suit Gundam: The Origin	Yoshikazu Yasuhiko	Kadokawa Shoten
2013	Inherit the Stars	Yukinobu Hoshino	Shogakukan
2014	The World of Narue	Tomohiro Marukawa	Kadokawa Shoten
2015	Moyasimon	Masayuki Ishikawa	Kodansha
2016	Knights of Sidonia	Tsutomu Nihei	Kodansha
2017	Kochira Katsushika-ku Kameari Kōen-mae Hashutsujo	Osamu Akimoto	Shueisha
2018	And Yet the Town Moves	Masakazu Ishiguro	Shōnen Gahōsha
2019	Girls' Last Tour	Tsukumizu	Shinchosha
2020	How Many Light-Years to Babylon?	Seiman Douman	Akita Shoten
2020	Batman Ninja	Masato Hisa	Hero's Inc.
2021	Hozuki's Coolheadedness	Natsumi Eguchi	Kodansha
2021	Kimi o Shinasenai Tame no Storia	Toriko Gin	Akita Shoten
2022	Psychic Squad	Takashi Shiina	Shogakukan
2023	Orb: On the Movements of the Earth	Uoto	Shogakukan
2024	Delicious in Dungeon	Ryoko Kui	Enterbrain
2025	Land of the Lustrous	Haruko Ichikawa	Kodansha
2026	Apocalypse Hotel Pusupusu	Izumi Takemoto	Takeshobo

=== Best Artist ===
Year	Work
1979	Naoyuki Kato
1980	Noriyoshi Ohrai
1981	Yoshikazu Yasuhiko
1982	Shusei Nagaoka
1983	Yoshitaka Amano
1984	Yoshitaka Amano
1985	Yoshitaka Amano
1986	Yoshitaka Amano
1987	Michiaki Satō
1988	Jun Suemi
1989	Hiroyuki Katō & Keisuke Gotō
1990	Katsumi Michihara
1991	Eiji Yokoyama
1992	Masamune Shirow
1993	Keinojō Mizutama
1994	Hitoshi Yoneda
1995	Keinojō Mizutama
1996	Akihiro Yamada
1997	Yuji Kaida
1998	Shigeru Mizuki
1999	Takami Akai
2000	Kenji Tsuruta
2001	Kenji Tsuruta
2002	Katsuya Terada
2003	Makoto Shinkai
2004	Daisuke Nishijima
2005	Makoto Shinkai
2006	Range Murata
2007	Yoshitaka Amano
2008	Naoyuki Kato
2009	Naoyuki Kato
2010	Naoyuki Kato
2011	Naoyuki Kato
2012	Naohiro Washio
2013	Kenji Tsuruta
2014	Naoyuki Kato
2015	Keinojō Mizutama
2016	Noriyoshi Ohrai
2017	Naoyuki Kato
2018	Noriko Nagano
2019	Naoyuki Kato
2020	Yūko Shiraishi
2021	Yūko Shiraishi
2022	Naoyuki Kato
2023	Kenji Tsuruta
2023	Naoyuki Kato
2024	Kia Asamiya
2025	Kia Asamiya
2026	Ikuto Yamashita

=== Best Nonfiction ===
Year	Work
1985	Kōseiki no Sekai (光世紀の世界) by Fujio Ishihara
1986	Tokusatsu Hero Retsuden (特撮ヒーロー列伝) by Noriaki Ikeda
1987	Ishihara Hakase no SF Kenkyūshitsu (石原博士のSF研究室) by Fujio Ishihara
1988	Wizardry Nikki (ウィザードリィ日記) by Tetsu Yano
1989	Space Opera no Kakikata (スペース・オペラの書き方) by Masahiro Noda
1990	Future Magic by Robert L. Forward
1991	SF Handbook (SFハンドブック), edited by Hayakawa Publishing Editorial Office
1992	TV series "Denshi Rikkoku Nippon no Jijoden" (電子立国日本の自叙伝) by NHK
1993	The Minds of Billy Milligan by Daniel Keyes
1994	Yasashii Uchū Kaihatsu Nyūmon (やさしい宇宙開発入門) by Masahiro Noda
1995	Itoshino Wonderland: Space Opera no Yomikata (愛しのワンダーランド——スペース・オペラの読み方) by Masahiro Noda
1996	Tondemo-bon no Sekai (トンデモ本の世界), edited by Togakkai
1997	Tondemo-bon no Gyakushū (トンデモ本の逆襲), edited by Togakkai
1998	Walking Humanoid Robot P2 by Honda
1999	Uchū o Kūsōshitekita Hitobito (宇宙を空想してきた人々) by Masahiro Noda
2000	AIBO by Sony
2001	Motto Sugoi Kagaku de Mamorimasu! (もっとすごい科学で守ります！) by Yūichi Hasegawa
2002	NHK Shōnen Drama Series no Subete (NHK少年ドラマシリーズのすべて) by Hisaaki Masuyama
2003	Uchū eno Passport (宇宙へのパスポート) by Yūichi Sasamoto
2004	Uchū eno Passport 2 (宇宙へのパスポート 2) by Yūichi Sasamoto
2005	Maeda Kensetsu Fantasy Eigyobu (前田建設ファンタジー営業部) by Maeda Corporation
2006	Disappearance Diary (失踪日記) by Hideo Azuma
2007	Uchū eno Passport 3 (宇宙へのパスポート 3) by Yūichi Sasamoto
2008	Hoshi Shinichi: 1001 Wa o Tsukutta Hito (星新一 一〇〇一話を作った人) by Hazuki Saishō
2009	Sekai no SF ga Yattekita! Nippon Con File 2007 (世界のSFがやってきた!!——ニッポンコン・ファイル2007) edited by Science Fiction and Fantasy Writers of Japan
2010	Nihon SF Seishinshi (日本SF精神史) by Yasuo Nagayama
2011	Sa wa Science no Sa (サはサイエンスのサ) by Tsukasa Shikano
2012	Azuma Hideo Sōtokushū: Bishōjo, SF, Fujōri Gag, Soshite Shissō (吾妻ひでお〈総特集〉——美少女・SF・不条理ギャグ、そして失踪), edited by Kawade Shobō Shinsha
2013	Offprint of "The Present and Future of CGM: The World Opened Up by Hatsune Miku, Nico Nico Douga, and PIAPRO" from the May 2012 issue of IPSJ Magazine, published by Information Processing Society of Japan
2014	Utyū he Ikitakute Ekitai Nenryō Rocket o DIY shitemita (宇宙へ行きたくて液体燃料ロケットをDIYしてみた) by Yoshitoo Asari
2015	Sanrio SF Bunko Sōkaisetsu (サンリオSF文庫総解説) edited by Shinji Maki and Nozomi Ohmori
2016	SF made 10,000 Kōnen (SFまで10,000光年) and SF made 100,000 Kōnen Ijō (SFまで100,000光年以上) by Keinojō Mizutama
2017	SF no S ha Suteki no S (SFのSは、ステキのS) by Haruna Ikezawa
2018	Arienakunai Kagaku no Kyōkasho (アリエナクナイ科学ノ教科書 〜空想設定を読み解く31講〜) by Kurare, collaborated with Yakuri Kyōshitsu
2019	Tsutsui Yasutaka Jisaku o Kataru (筒井康隆、自作を語る) by Yasutaka Tsutsui, edited by Sanzō Kusaka
2020	NHK's 100 minutes on a famous book: Sakyo Komatsu Special "Mythology in the Age of Godlessness" (NHK 100分de名著『小松左京スペシャル 「神」なき時代の神話』, NHK Hyappun De Meicho: Komatsu Sakyō Special "Kami" naki Jidai no Shinwa) by Tetsuya Miyazaki (NHK Publishing, Inc.)
2021	NHK's 100 minutes on a famous book: Arthur C. Clarke Special "Not Just Imagination" (NHK 100分de名著『アーサー・C・クラークスペシャル ただの「空想」ではない』, NHK Hyappun De Meicho: Arthur C. Clarke Special Tada no "Kūsō" deha nai) by Hideaki Sena (NHK Publishing, Inc.)
2022	Gakken's Visual Encyclopedia: Super Sentai (学研の図鑑 スーパー戦隊) by Hiroshi Matsui, Toei Company, Ltd., and Gakken Plus Co., Ltd.
2023	ARUKIKATA MU ～guide to parallel world～ (地球の歩き方 ムー ～異世界（パラレルワールド）の歩き方～) by ARUKIKATA Editorial Team, Gakken Inc.
2024	The Complete Guide of Sogen SF Bunko (創元SF文庫総解説), edited by Tokyo Sogensha
2025	History of Girls SF Manga with a focus on Showa golden age (SF少女マンガ全史 昭和黄金期を中心に, SF Shoujo Manga Zenshi) by Yasuo Nagayama
2026	Norio Itoh's Encyclopedia Fantastica (伊藤典夫評論集成, Itoh Norio Hyōron Shūsei) by Norio Itoh

=== Non Category Nomination ===
Year	Work
2002	H-IIA Rocket Test Flight 1, by Japan Aerospace Exploration Agency
2003	Humanoid Robot HRP-2 Promet, by Yutaka Izubuchi and Kawada Industries
2004	Toy The Royal Museum of Science series one, supervised by Toshio Okada, manufactured by Takara and Kaiyodo
2005	Japan Pavilion of the 9th Venice Biennale of Architecture, by Japan Foundation, Kaichirō Morikawa, and participating artists
2006	Landing on the asteroid Itokawa by the asteroid sample return mission MUSES-C "Hayabusa", by Japan Aerospace Exploration Agency
2007	M-V Rocket, by Japan Aerospace Exploration Agency
2008	Hatsune Miku, by Crypton Future Media Co.
2009	(No award)
2010	Gundam 30th Anniversary Project Real G the Statue of Gundam, built by Sunrise Inc. and Nomura Co., Ltd.
2011	Return of Hayabusa probe (the 20th Science Satellite MUSES-C) to Earth, operated by Japan Aerospace Exploration Agency
2012	(No award)
2013	iPS cells, Center for iPS Cell Research and Application, Kyoto University
2014	NOVA original anthology series, edited by Nozomi Ohmori
2015	TV drama Aoi Honō
2016	Publication of the 500th volume of Perry Rhodan series in Japan
2017	Formal designation of element 113 as Nihonium
2018	The tribute project to the 50th anniversary of Locke the Superman
2019	MINERVA-II-1 landed on the surface of asteroid Ryugu (the world's first man-made object to explore movement on an asteroid surface), Hayabusa2 Project
2020	The first-ever image of a black hole, by Event Horizon Telescope collaboration
2021	Amabie, a Japanese monster that wades off an epidemic
2022	Completion of Evangelion: New Theatrical Series
2023	(No award)
2024	Giant Robots The Core of Japanese Mecha Anime, Organization: NISHINIPPON SHIMBUN EVENT SERVICE, PIA, Supervision: YOZO Yamaguchi, Planning and Coordination: KEISUKE Hirota, TARKUS "KOJI Igarashi"
2025	Smart Lander for Investigating Moon (SLIM) achieved world's first high-precision landing on the Moon
2026	Myaku-Myaku, the official character of EXPO 2025 Osaka Kansai

=== Special Award ===
SFFAN may give out special awards, which are not voted on. They are regarded as official Seiun Awards. All but one, Uchūjin, of them were given posthumously for people who contributed Japanese SF fandom.

Year	Winner
1980	Motoichirō Takebe, artist
1982	Uchūjin as Japanese oldest Sci-Fi fanzine
1989	Osamu Tezuka, comic artist
2005	Tetsu Yano, translator/author
2007	Yoshihiro Yonezawa, manga critic/author/Comiket's co-founder and president
2008	Kōichirō Noda (Masahiro Noda), translator/author
2010	Takumi Shibano (Rei Kozumi), translator/author
2011	Sakyo Komatsu, author

== See also ==
- List of manga awards
- Nihon SF Taisho Award
- Hayakawa's S-F Magazine Reader's Award
