= Issui Ogawa =

Issui Ogawa (小川 一水, Ogawa Issui; born 1975) is a science fiction writer of more than a dozen novels. His stories are often sociological in nature dealing with issues like disaster and democracy.

== Awards ==
- 2004: Seiun Award Best Japanese Novel of the Year for Dai Roku Tairiku (第六大陸)
- 2006: Seiun Award Best Japanese Short Story of the Year for "Tadayotta Otoko" (漂った男)
- 2011: Seiun Award Best Japanese Short Story of the Year for "Arisuma ō no aishita mamono" (アリスマ王の愛した魔物)
- 2014: Seiun Award Best Japanese Novel of the Year for Kororogi dake kara mokusei toroya e (コロロギ岳から木星トロヤへ)
- 2019: Nihon SF Taisho Award for Tenmei no shirube (天冥の標)
- 2020: Seiun Award Best Japanese Novel of the Year for Tenmei no shirube (天冥の標)

== Personal life ==
Issui Ogawa was born in Gifu Prefecture, and currently resides in Aichi Prefecture. He is married and has two children.

== Bibliography ==
=== English translation ===
- Novels
  - The Lord of the Sands of Time (2009), translation of Toki Suna no Ō (時砂の王) (2007)
  - The Next Continent (2010), translation of Dai roku tairiku (第六大陸) (2003)
- Short stories
  - "Old Vohl's Planet" (2003) translation by Jim Hubbert in Speculative Japan 2: The Old Man Who Watched the Sea and Other Tales of Japanese Science Fiction and Fantasy (Kurodahan Press, 2011)
  - "Golden Bread" (The Future is Japanese, Viz Media, Haikasoru, 2012)
  - "To the Blue Star" (Speculative Japan 3, Kurodahan Press, 2012)
