= Hōsuke Nojiri =

Japanese science fiction writer (born 1961)

Hōsuke Nojiri (野尻 抱介, Nojiri Hōsuke) (born 1961 in Mie Prefecture) is a Japanese science fiction writer.

After a career as a CAD programmer and game designer, he was first published in 1992, the Creguian game novelization.

He admires Arthur C. Clarke, and his own works are classified as hard science fiction, favoring planetary science as a theme. His Rocket Girls series deals with human spaceflight in a light novel form with hard SF backing; the reason that only girls are hired as astronauts in the novels is for their light weight.

== Awards ==
- 1999: S-F Magazine Readers Award Best Japanese Short Story for "Taiyō no Sandatsusha" (太陽の簒奪者) (short story version)
- 2000: Seiun Award Best Short Story of the Year for "Taiyō no Sandatsusha" (太陽の簒奪者) (short story version)
- 2002: Seiun Award Best Novel of the Year for Fuwa-fuwa no Izumi (ふわふわの泉)
- 2003: Seiun Award Best Novel of the Year for Usurper of the Sun (太陽の簒奪者, Taiyō no Sandatsu-sha) (novel version)
- 2007: Seiun Award Best Short Story of the Year for "Ō-buroshiki to Kumo no Ito" (大風呂敷と蜘蛛の糸) ("A Furoshiki and Spider's Thread")
- 2008: Seiun Award Best Short Story of the Year for "Chinmoku no Flyby" (沈黙のフライバイ)
- 2009: Seiun Award Best Short Story of the Year for "Nankyokuten no Peer-Peer dōga" (南極点のピアピア動画)

== Bibliography ==
=== English ===
- Usurper of the Sun (2009): translation of Taiyō no Sandatsusha (太陽の簒奪者) (2002) (Translated by John Wunderley)
- Rocket Girls (2010): translation of Rocket Girl (ロケットガール) (1995)
- Rocket Girls: The Last Planet (2011): translation of Rocket Girl 2 (ロケットガール2) (1996)
