= The Venus Wars =

Japanese manga series and its adaptations

- Original Japanese theatrical release poster

ヴイナス戦記 (Vinasu Senki)
- Genre: Adventure, Science fiction
- Manga
- Written by: Yoshikazu Yasuhiko
- Published by: Gakken, Chuokoron-Shinsha
- English publisher: NA: Dark Horse Comics
- Magazine: Nora Comics
- Original run: 1986 – 1990
- Volumes: 4
- Anime film
- Directed by: Yoshikazu Yasuhiko
- Produced by: Yasuo Kaneko; Tsuneyuki Morishima
- Written by: Yoshikazu Yasuhiko; Yūichi Sasamoto
- Music by: Joe Hisaishi
- Studio: Kugatsusha
- Licensed by: NA: Sentai Filmworks; UK: Anime Limited
- Released: March 11, 1989
- Runtime: 102 minutes
- Video game
- Publisher: Varie
- Genre: Strategy
- Platform: Family Computer
- Released: October 14, 1989
- icon

The Venus Wars (Japanese: ヴイナス戦記, Hepburn: Vinasu Senki) is a Japanese manga series written and illustrated by Yoshikazu Yasuhiko. It was serialized in the Gakken magazine Nora Comics from 1986 to 1990. In 1989, The Venus Wars was adapted into an anime film directed by Yasuhiko, co-written by Yuichi Sasamoto and Yasuhiko, and produced by Bandai Visual, Gakken, and Shochiku.

== Manga ==
The manga was originally published in Japan by Gakken from 1986 to 1990, and then by Chuokoron-Shinsha in 1999. The manga was translated into English by Dark Horse Comics in 1993 and in French by NaBan in 2024.

== Film ==
=== Plot ===
In the year 2003, a comet designated Apollon collides with the planet Venus and disperses much of the planet's atmosphere, adds enough moisture to form acidic seas, and speeds up its rotation to give it a day that matches its year. This unlikely yet scientifically sound accident enables humanity to partially terraform Venus, sending the first crewed ships in 2007 and begin colonizing it in 2012. By the year 2089, Venus has a population in the millions and is divided into two separate nation states, the northern continent of Ishtar and the southern continent of Aphrodia.

Susan Sommers, a bubbly reporter from Earth, travels to Venus hoping to get a scoop on the military tensions that have arisen between the two nations. She arrives in the Aphrodian capital of Io shortly before the city is invaded by the forces of Ishtar, led by General Donner.

Meanwhile, a brutal, Rollerballesque racing game is being held in a local stadium. One team, the Killer Commandos, is led by hotshot Hiro Seno. The game is disrupted by the invasion and the team quickly evacuates. Hiro's teammate Will picks up Sue on the way and takes her to the garage where the rest of the team is lying low. The invasion of Io is completed in one day, and the politicians, police, and press submit to Ishtar's authority. The city is put under martial law and a curfew imposed. Many of Io's citizens, including Hiro's girlfriend Maggy, try to pretend that nothing has changed since the invasion, but Donner's iron grip on the city is too tight to ignore.

Hiro visits his teammate Jack, who is staying in his uncle's high rise apartment. However, the police see them as trespassers and lead an unprovoked assault against Hiro, who makes a daring escape from their custody. However, his leg is pierced by a bullet and he barely makes it to Maggy's home before he collapses. Hiro reveals many of the terraforming farms funded by the Aphrodian government were frauds simply meant to secure land away from Ishtar and that their crops continually kept failing since the plants could not endure the constantly changing weather conditions of the planet, despite the planet's politicians saying otherwise. This upsets Maggy so much that she breaks down in tears, prompting a concerned Hiro to comfort her. Hiro and Maggy share a passionate kiss before Maggy's father returns from work, forcing Hiro to hide in a back room. Maggy's father, a bureaucrat, reveals his plan to have himself and Maggy evacuated out of Io as he did with her brother and mother. Maggy defiantly stands up to her father and defends her friends, before he furiously shouts her into silence as Hiro secretly storms out.

Meanwhile, Miranda, the leader of the Killer Commandos, discovers that their manager, Gary, has been secretly smuggling arms into the city. Raiding his cache, she reveals her plan to demolish the Ishtar tanks that are parked in the old stadium. Gary says that the Commandos would be fools to try such a suicidal mission, but Hiro likes the idea and inspires his teammates. The Killer Commandos lead an assault against the tanks, but underestimate the strength of Ishtar's military. Jack and Gary are killed in the melee, and Hiro nearly shares their fate. At the last minute, however, the team is saved by the Aphrodian Freedom Force, which had also been planning to attack the stadium that night.

Sue and the Killer Commandos are forcibly recruited by Lt. Kurtz, who thinks that their skills as monobikers (riders of motorized unicycles) would be useful in his Bloodhound Squadron. Tensions run high among the Killer Commandos and the team is divided; Will and Sue think that it is important to fight for Aphrodia's freedom, but Hiro and Miranda want nothing to do with war. Will is called out on a mission and Sue begs him to take her along. He instead convinces her to wire her camera to his monobike so he can film their attack. But to Sue's horror, Will disappears in battle. Sue steals a buggy to search for him on the battlefield, only to stumble upon the terrible truth of his death.

Upset over Will's fate, Hiro and the Commandos demand to be freed from the Freedom Force's custody. Lt. Kurtz and Hiro quickly strike up an animosity, and Kurtz challenges Hiro to a race across a ravine in their monobikes. Despite having a ten-second head start, Hiro is taken out by Kurtz. Nevertheless, Kurtz is impressed by Hiro's raw talent, and makes him a deal: he will release the Killer Commandos on the condition that Hiro joins the Bloodhound Squadron. Hiro grudgingly accepts his offer, and says goodbye to Miranda and his friends.

Back in Io, General Donner is visited by Sue, who requests an interview with him for the Independent Press on Earth. Once alone with him, Sue pulls a gun and threatens to kill him in order to avenge Will and all the other innocent people who have died in the war. She fails to release the safety however, and is quickly disarmed and arrested. Displaying his sadism Gerhard accosts Sue, snatches away her firearm, then discharges her pistol inches from the side of her head, before putting it to her skull and pulling the trigger, cruelly revealing he has used up all the bullets.

Kurtz leads the Bloodhound Squadron in a surprise and intense strike on Io. Kurtz is disabled, but Hiro manages, through sheer luck and skill, to corner Donner's tank and destroy it by getting Gerhard to fire on him (raging that he shall not be beaten by children), with his shots missing Hiro and striking a runway that collapses on top of (screeching with frustration) Gerhard in his tank. With their leader dead, the Ishtar forces are quickly disbanded and Aphrodia is freed from their control. Kurtz and Hiro end their animosity and Kurtz gives Hiro his monobike as a sign of goodwill. While driving through the streets, Hiro encounters the recently released Sue, who is being evacuated to Earth. She thanks him for all of his help, and he tells her to come back and visit Venus again.

Following Sue's tip, Hiro makes the long trek to a refugee camp; there, he and Maggy are happily reunited (thanks to her Siamese cat Andrew). Back on Earth, Sue has given a world exclusive on the Venus Wars. She plans to spend her vacation on Venus so she can rejoin her friends.

=== Voice cast ===
Character	Japanese	English	
Character	Japanese	Manga Entertainment (1993)	Sentai Filmworks (2021)
Hiroki Senō	Katsuhide Uekusa	Ben Fairman	Adam Gibbs
Susan Sommers	Eriko Hara	Denica Fairman	Maggie Flecknoe
Gary	Goro Naya	Bob Sessions	John Gremillion
Tao	Hiroshi Kawaguchi		Mike Haimoto
Will	Houchu Ohtsuka	Bradley Cole	David Matranga
Gerhard Donner	Kaneto Shiozawa	Peter Marinker	David Wald
Cathy	Konami Yoshida	Stacey Gregg	Christina Kelly
Jeff	Kouichi Yamadera		
Jack Guinan	Kiyoyuki Yanada		Scott Gibbs
Robert Ishii	Masami Kikuchi	Michael Morris	Mark Allen Jr.
Manuel	Mitsuaki Hoshino		
Kenny	Naoki Makishima		Blake Jackson
Kurtz	Shuichi Ikeda	William Dufries	Seán Patrick Judge
McMurdo Sims	Tesshō Genda	Sean Barrett	Rob Mungle
Chris	Tsutomu Kashiwakura		
Maggie's Father	Yousuke Akimoto	Sean Barrett	John Swasey
Maggie Nakamoto	Yuko Mizutani	Anna Alba	Luci Christian
Miranda Cocker	Yuko Sasaki	Jocelyn Cunningham	Christine Auten

=== Music ===
A remastered version of the soundtrack was released on January 2, 2006, by Sony/Columbia Records.

=== Releases ===
The Venus Wars film was localized in the United Kingdom and the United States by Manga Entertainment and Central Park Media respectively, gaining recognition when it aired in heavy rotation on the Sci-Fi Channel "Saturday Anime" movie block in the early 1990s. The film was licensed by Central Park Media and released on VHS on October 20, 1993, in North America. It was later released on DVD on November 3, 1998, and again on DVD on January 28, 2003. In Australia and New Zealand, it was distributed by Madman Entertainment. Discotek Media later licensed the film and released it on DVD in 2012 from a new film print which has anamorphic widescreen, a significant upgrade over the old Central Park Media release, which was letterboxed and from a grainy, stretched source. Discotek later released the film on Blu-ray on December 15, 2015. After Discotek's license for the film expired, Sentai Filmworks rescued the film for home video and digital release, with an all-new English re-dub.

== Video game ==
Based on the film, Venus Senki is a Nintendo Family Computer strategy game with an innovative battle system. The story is about eight Hound Combat Bikers fighting against the invading Ishtar Empire forces in an effort to liberate the city of Io and driving Ishtar out of their homeland of Aphrodia.
