= Yūichi Sasamoto =

Japanese science fiction writer (born 1963)

Yūichi Sasamoto 笹本 祐一
- Born: February 18, 1963 (age 62)
- Occupation: Science fiction writer

Yūichi Sasamoto (笹本 祐一, Sasamoto Yūichi; born February 18, 1963) is a Japanese science fiction writer who won Seiun Awards for Hoshi no Pilot 2: Suiseikari, Ariel and also for three non-fiction volumes, Passport to the Universe. He also co-wrote the film Venus Wars with Yoshikazu Yasuhiko. His work Miniskirt Pirates was adapted into an anime television series in 2012.
