= Ariel (novel series) =

Japanese light novel series and its adaptations

- ARIEL

ARIEL エリアル (Eriaru)
- Genre: Comedy, Science fiction
- Light novel
- Written by: Yūichi Sasamoto
- Illustrated by: Masahisa Suzuki
- Published by: Asahi Sonorama
- Imprint: Sonorama Bunko
- Magazine: Shishiō
- Original run: 1986 – February 28, 2006
- Volumes: 20 + 2 side stories
- Original video animation

ARIEL Visual
- Directed by: Junichi Watanabe
- Written by: Muneo Kubo; Yuichi Sasamoto
- Music by: Kohei Tanaka (composer)
- Studio: Animate, J.C.Staff
- Licensed by: NA: Central Park Media
- Released: July 21, 1989 – August 21, 1989
- Runtime: 30 minutes (each)
- Episodes: 2
- Original video animation

ARIEL Deluxe
- Directed by: Junichi Watanabe
- Studio: Animate, J.C.Staff
- Licensed by: NA: Central Park Media
- Released: January 21, 1991 – April 21, 1991
- Runtime: 45 minutes (each)
- Episodes: 2
- icon

ARIEL (エリアル, Eriaru) (which stands for "All a-Round Intercept and Escort Lady") is a mecha science fiction novel series by Yūichi Sasamoto, adapted into anime OVA series from 1989 to 1991. ARIEL is also known as The ARIEL Project. The anime was released in the United States by Central Park Media in 2003.

== Characters ==
Dr. Kishida: a mad scientist from SCEBAI who builds ARIEL and persuades his granddaughters and niece to pilot against Alien invaders.

Mia Kawaii: Dr. Kishida's niece, who is enrolled in college and persuaded to pilot it if her Uncle pays her tuition.

Aya Kishida: a high school student who would rather be studying for her exams than fighting aliens; Dr. Kishida's granddaughter.

Kazumi Kishida: a middle school student who wants to please her grandfather, and really likes piloting ARIEL.

Saber Starblast: a mysterious alien vigilante who helps ARIEL combat the invading Aliens.

Miss Simone: Albert's dreaded accounting department head, sent to personally oversee his overspending.
