= Naoyuki Kato =

Japanese illustrator

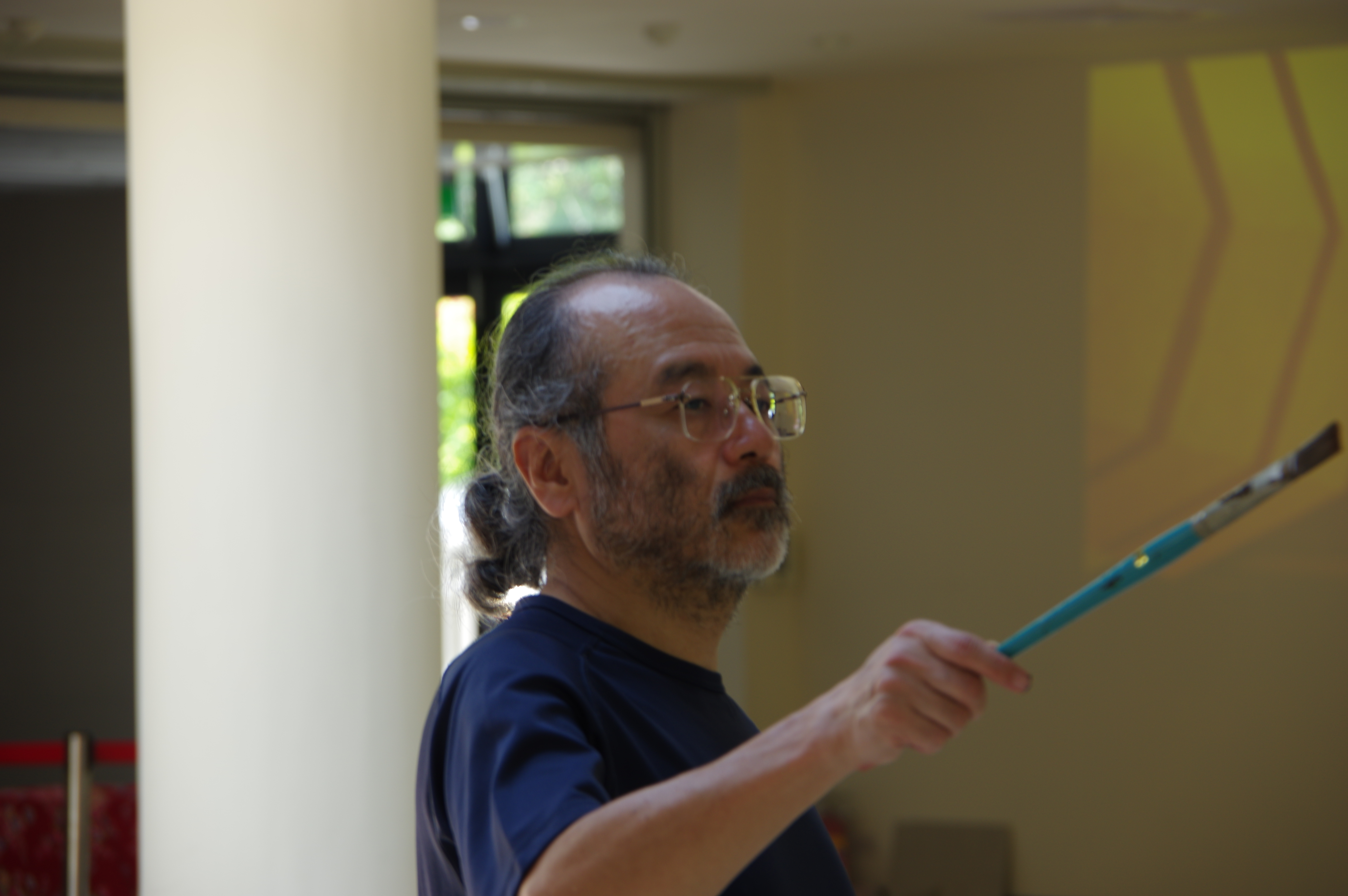
Naoyuki Kato

Naoyuki Kato (加藤 直之, Katō Naoyuki; born 1952) is a Japanese illustrator, a native of Hamamatsu City, Japan.

== Illustration works ==
A noted science-fiction artist since the 1970s, he has contributed to many science fiction/fantasy magazines, novels and games. He was one of the four charter members of Studio Nue in 1972 along with Haruka Takachiho, Kazutaka Miyatake and Kenichi Matsuzaki. He has published several compilation books of his work.

== Magazine and novel illustration work ==
- SF Magazine (1974 -1984-2005)
- SF Adventure (1988–1990)Frank Herbert
- Dune (novel) books 2-6 (Frank Herbert)
- Guin Saga novel series (Kaoru Kurimoto)
- Legend of the Galactic Heroes (Yoshiki Tanaka)
- Frontier Series Galaxy (A. Bertram Chandler, Masahiro Noda)
- Galaxy Series Beggar Corps (Masahiro Noda)
- Starship Troopers (Robert A. Heinlein)
- Sayonara Jupiter (Sakyo Komatsu)

== Games ==
- R-Type (1988) - cover illustration (Japan, for MSX and Sharp X68000)
- The Guardian Legend (1988) - cover illustration (Japan only)
- Super Aleste (1992) - package illustration, illustrations
- Traveller - package illustration, illustrations
- Legend of the Galactic Heroes - package illustration, poster
- Digan no Maseki - art director, original illustration
- Culdcept - main visual
- Legion - cover illustration (PC Engine)

== Illustration collections ==
Asahi Sonorama published at least three compilations of Kato's work in the 1980s under the title "Katou Naoyuki Gashuu", subtitled in English "Naoyuki Katoh SF Illustrations":

- Volume 1, ISBN 4-257-03140-9. 105 illustrations with 95 in color; foreword by Sakyo Komatsu
- Volume 2, ISBN 4-257-03175-1. 114 illustrations with 103 in color; foreword by Robert T. McCall and Aritsune Toyota
- Volume 3, ISBN 4-257-03228-6. 110 illustrations in full color; foreword by Noriyoshi Ohrai
