= Sayuri Ueda =

Japanese writer (born 1964)

- Born: October 26, 1964 (age 61); Kobe, Hyōgo Prefecture, Japan
- Occupation: Writer
- Writing career
- Language: Japanese
- Genres: Science fiction, fantasy
- Notable awards: Sakyo Komatsu Award (2003); Japan SF Award (2011)

Sayuri Ueda (上田早夕里, Ueda Sayuri; born October 26, 1964) is a Japanese science fiction and fantasy writer.

VIZ Productions is developing a feature film based on her short story "The Street of Fruiting Bodies."

== Works in English translation ==
Novel

- The Cage of Zeus (original title: Zeusu no Ori), trans. Takami Nieda (Haikasoru, 2011)

Short stories

- "Fin and Claw" (original title: Uobune, Kemonobune), trans. Daniel Huddleston (Speculative Japan 3: Silver Bullet and Other Tales of Japanese Science Fiction and Fantasy, Kurodahan Press, 2012)
- "The Street of Fruiting Bodies" (original title: Kusabira no Michi) (Phantasm Japan: Fantasies Light and Dark, From and About Japan, Haikasoru, 2014)

== Awards ==
- 2003 – Sakyo Komatsu Award: Kasei Daku Barado (Mars Dark Ballade)
- 2011 – Japan SF Award: Karyu no Miya (The Ocean Chronicles)

== Bibliography ==
=== The Ocean Chronicles series ===
- Novels
  - Karyu no Miya (華竜の宮), 2010
  - Shinku no Hibun (深紅の碑文), 2013
- Short stories
  - "Uobune, Kemonobune" (魚舟・獣舟) (2006) (English translation: "Fin and Claw")
  - "Lilienthal no Matsuei" (リリエンタールの末裔) (2011)

=== Pastry series ===
- La pâtisserie (ラ・パティスリー), 2005
- Chocolatier no Kunsho (ショコラティエの勲章), 2008
- Kashifesu no Niwa (菓子フェスの庭), 2011

=== Yokai Detective series ===
- Yokai Tantei Hyakume 1: Shunuri no Machi (妖怪探偵・百目1 朱塗の街), 2014

=== Standalone sci-fi/fantasy novels ===
- Kasei Daku Barado (火星ダーク・バラード), 2003
- Zeusu no Ori (ゼウスの檻), 2004 (English translation: The Cage of Zeus, Haikasoru, 2011)
- Mizuki no Zanko (美月の残香), 2008
- Black Agate (ブラック・アゲート), 2012
- Kunko no Canopeum (薫香のカナピウム), 2015

=== Short story collections ===
- Uobune, Kemonobune (魚舟・獣舟), 2009
  - "Uobune, Kemonobune" (魚舟・獣舟) (2006) (English translation: "Fin and Claw")
  - "Kusabira no Michi" (くさびらの道) (2007) (English translation: "The Street of Fruiting Bodies")
  - "Shinshu no Machi" (真朱の街) (2008)
  - "Kyoo" (饗応) (2007)
  - "Blue Glass" (ブルーグラス) (2004)
  - "Kotori no Haka" (小鳥の墓) (2009)
- Lilienthal no Matsuei (リリエンタールの末裔), 2011
  - "Lilienthal no Matsuei" (リリエンタールの末裔) (2011)
  - "Magunefio" (マグネフィオ) (2009)
  - "Night Blue no Kiroku" (ナイト・ブルーの記録) (2011)
  - "Maboroshi no Chronometer" (幻のクロノメーター) (2011)
