= List of Harper's Bazaar UK cover models =

This list of Harper's Bazaar UK cover models (1950–present) is a catalog of cover models who have appeared on the cover of Harper's Bazaar UK, the British edition of American fashion magazine Harper's Bazaar. From 1970 to 2006 the magazine was named Harper's & Queen.

== 1950s ==
=== 1950 ===
Issue	Cover model	Photographer
January	Mary Jane Russell	Louise Dahl-Wolfe
February		Ernst Beadle
March	Shelagh Wilson	Richard Dormer
April		Maurice Tabard
May		John French
June		Genevieve Naylor
July		Richard Avedon
August	Myrtle Crawford	Maurice Ambler
September	Kay Kendall	Richard Dormer
October	Pat O'Reilly	Richard Dormer
November	Dovima	Richard Avedon
December	Jackie Stoloff	Richard Avedon

=== 1951 ===
Issue	Cover model	Photographer
January	Sandra Nelson	Karen Radkai
February	Anne Gunning	Richard Dormer
March	Shelagh Wilson	Richard Dormer
April		
May		
June	Barbara Mullen	Richard Avedon
July	Dovima	Richard Avedon
August	Dovima	Richard Avedon
September	Shelagh Wilson	Richard Dormer
October		
November		Richard Avedon
December		

=== 1952 ===
Issue	Cover model	Photographer
January	Shelagh Wilson	Richard Dormer
February	Della Oake	Richard Dormer
March	Della Oake	Richard Dormer
April		Richard Dormer
May	Shelagh Wilson	Richard Dormer
June	Mary Jane Russell	Louise Dahl-Wolfe
July	Fiona Campbell-Walter	Richard Dormer
August		Richard Dormer
September		John French
October	Georgia Hamilton	Richard Avedon
November	Jean Patchett	Louise Dahl-Wolfe
December	Suzy Parker	Richard Avedon

=== 1953 ===
Issue	Cover model	Photographer
January	Mary Jane Russell	Louise Dahl-Wolfe
February	Anne Gunning	Richard Dormer
March	Della Oake	Richard Dormer
April	Anne Gunning	Richard Dormer
May	Anne Gunning	Richard Dormer
June		Oliver Messel
July	Cherry Nelms	Richard Avedon
August	Susan Abraham	Keith Ewart
September	Susan Abraham	Richard Dormer
October	Shelagh Wilson	Richard Dormer
November	Barbara Mullen	Lillian Bassman
December	Shelagh Wilson	Richard Dormer

=== 1954 ===
Issue	Cover model	Photographer
January	Millie Perkins	
February	The Well-Spent Pound	
March		
April		Tom Kublin
May	Anne Gunning	
June	Mary Jane Russell	Louise Dahl-Wolfe
July	Georgia Hamilton	Richard Avedon
August		
September	Dovima	Richard Dormer
October		
November	Anne Gunning	Richard Dormer
December	Cherry Nelms	Richard Avedon

=== 1955 ===
Issue	Cover model	Photographer
January	Anne Gunning	Richard Dormer
February		Richard Dormer
March	Spring Collections	
April	Anne Gunning	
May	Ivy Nicholson	Richard Dormer
June	Anne Gunning	Richard Avedon
July		
August	Anne Gunning	
September	International Collections	Richard Avedon
October	Anne Gunning	Richard Dormer
November	Dovima	Richard Avedon
December	Anne Gunning	Richard Dormer

=== 1956 ===
Issue	Cover model	Photographer
January	Dovima	Richard Avedon
February	Fiona Campbell-Walter	Richard Dormer
March	Spring Collections	Tom Kublin
April	Simone D'Aillencourt	Tom Kublin
May		
June		
July	Suzy Parker	Richard Avedon
August	Into Autumn Now	
September	International Collections	
October	Simone D'Aillencourt	
November	Mary Hilem	Richard Dormer
December		

=== 1957 ===
Issue	Cover model	Photographer
January	15 Pages of Fabric News	
February	Pat O'Reilly	Richard Dormer
March		Leslie Gill
April	Anne Gunning	Richard Dormer
May	Anne Gunning	Richard Dormer
June	Jane Werner	Richard Dormer
July		Richard Avedon
August	Anne Gunning	Tom Kublin
September	Collections	Jane Bixby
October		
November		Tom Kublin
December		Tom Kublin

=== 1958 ===
Issue	Cover model	Photographer
January	Enid Boulting	Tom Kublin
February		Richard Dormer
March	International Collections	Richard Dormer
April		Richard Dormer
May	Marie-Hélène Arnaud	Richard Dormer
June		Keith Ewart
July		Richard Dormer
August	Maggie Brown	Richard Dormer
September	Collections	
October	Jennifer Hocking	Tom Kublin
November	Enid Boulting	Tom Kublin
December		

=== 1959 ===
Issue	Cover model	Photographer
January	Susan Abraham	Richard Dormer
February	The Well Spent Pound	
March	Enid Boulting	Tom Kublin
April		Richard Dormer
May	Anne Gunning	Richard Dormer
June	Anne Gunning	Richard Dormer
July	Monique Chevalier	Michel Molinare
August		
September		
October		
November	Simone D'Aillencourt	Richard Dormer
December	Star-Studded Christmas	Tom Keogh

== 1960s ==
=== 1960 ===
Issue	Cover model	Photographer
January	Joy Weston	Richard Dormer
February		Richard Dormer
March		
April	Jennifer Hocking; Jan Williams	Richard Dormer
May	Jennifer Hocking	Richard Dormer
June	Maggi Eckardt	Tom Kublin
July	Maggie Brown	
August		Tom Kublin
September	Enid Boulting	Richard Dormer
October		Tom Kublin
November	Maggi Brown	Richard Dormer
December		

=== 1961 ===
Issue	Cover model	Photographer
January		Richard Dormer
February	Jennifer Hocking	Richard Dormer
March	Jennifer Hocking	Michel Molinare
April	Jennifer Hocking	Michael Williams
May	Gitta Schilling	Richard Dormer
June	Maggi Eckardt	Richard Dormer
July	Ros Watkins	Richard Dormer
August	Maggi Eckardt	Michael Molinare
September	Maggi Eckardt	Michael Molinare
October	Jennifer Hocking	Michael Williams
November		
December	Maggi Eckardt	Richard Dormer

=== 1962 ===
Issue	Cover model	Photographer
January		
February	Maggi Eckardt	Michael William
March		Don Pope
April		Michel Molinare
May	Jennifer Hocking	Michael Williams
June	Nena von Schlebrügge	Richard Dormer
July	Dolores Hawkins	Richard Dormer
August	Marie Lise Grés	Richard Dormer
September	Grace Coddington	Richard Dormer
October	Grace Coddington	Richard Dormer
November	Jennifer Hocking	Richard Dormer
December	Nena von Schlebrügge	Richard Dormer

=== 1963 ===
Issue	Cover model	Photographer
January		David Hurn
February		Michael Williams
March	Simone D'Aillencourt	Richard Dormer
April		Donald Silverstein
May		Donald Silverstein
June	Maggi Eckardt	Richard Dormer
July	Maggi Eckardt	Richard Dormer
August	Tania Mallet	David Hurn
September	Nena von Schlebrügge; Jennifer Hocking	Richard Dormer
October	Veruschka	Johnny Moncada
November	Celia Hammond	Terence Donovan
December		Richard Dormer

=== 1964 ===
Issue	Cover model	Photographer
January	Celia Hammond	Terence Donovan
February	Gunilla	Richard Dormer
March	Gunilla	Richard Dormer
April	Veruschka	Johnny Moncada
May	Sandra Paul	David Hurn
June	Sandra Paul	Richard Dormer
July	Sandra Paul	Richard Dormer
August	Helen Bunney	Michael Williams
September	Maggi Eckardt	Richard Dormer
October	Deborah Dixon	Johnny Moncada
November	Deborah Dixon	Johnny Moncada
December	Celia Hammond	James Moore

=== 1965 ===
Issue	Cover model	Photographer
January	Jill Kennington	David Montgomery
February	Celia Hammond	Frank Horvat
March	Antonia Boekestijn	David Montgomery
April	Antonia Boekesteijn	David Montgomery
May	Marie Les Grés	Richard Dormer
June	Celia Hammond	David Montgomery
July	Guinevere Tufnell	Richard Dormer
August		Richard Dormer
September	Ina Balke	Jeanloup Sieff
October	Deborah Dixon	Jeanloup Sieff
November	Ina Balke	Jeanloup Sieff
December	Sophia Loren	Richard Avedon

=== 1966 ===
Issue	Cover model	Photographer
January		Richard Dormer
February	Astrid Schiller	Richard Dormer
March		David Montgomery
April	Sunny Griffith	James Moore
May	Melanie Hampshire	David Montgomery
June	Donyale Luna	Bill King
July	Editha Dussler	Bill King
August	Dorthe Holm Jensen	Bill King
September	Antonia Boekesteijn	Frank Horvat
October	Brigitta af Klercker	Bill King
November	Kecia Nyman	Bill King
December	Brigitte Bauer	Bill King

=== 1967 ===
Issue	Cover model	Photographer
January	Merle Lynn	Bill King
February	Editha Dussler	Bill King
March	Editha Dussler	Bill King
April	Alberta Tiburzi	Bill King
May	Bettina Lauer	Bill King
June	Brigitte Bauer	Bill King
July	Jean Shrimpton	Bill King
August	Twiggy	Bill King
September	Bettina Lauer	Bill King
October	Brigitte Bauer	Bill King
November		Marc Leonard
December		Frank Horvat

=== 1968 ===
Issue	Cover model	Photographer
January/February	Katinka Kublin	Barry Lategan
March	Arlene Dahl	Peter Deal
April		Peter Deal
May		
June	Faye Dunaway	
July/August	Sandra Paul	Richard Dormer
September		Richard Dormer
October		Richard Dormer
November		John Carter
December	Biddy Lampard	Richard Dormer

=== 1969 ===
Issue	Cover model	Photographer
January/February	Tania Mallet	Richard Dormer
March		Sarah Moon
April	Donna Mitchell	Sarah Moon
May		Sarah Moon
June	Raquel Welch	Just de Villeneuve
July		
August		
September	Luciana Pignatelli	
October	Tania Mallet; Susan Blakely	Jeanloup Sieff
November	Ingmari Lamy	
December	Lynn Kohlmann	

== 1970s ==
=== 1970 ===
Issue	Cover model	Photographer
January		Art Kane
February		
March		
April	Geschi Fengler	Just Jaeckin
May	Benedetta Barzini	Leon Bruno Bodi
June	Geschi Fengler	
July	Celia Hammond	Just Jaeckin
August		
September	Louise Nordal	
October	Maudie James	
November		
December		David Anthony

=== 1971 ===
Issue	Cover model	Photographer
January	Elnora Waring	
February	Ingrid Boulting	David Anthony
March	Ingrid Boulting	David Anthony
April	Viviane Fauny	Helmut Newton
May	Barbara Miller	James Wedge
June		John Vaughan
July	Marie Helvin	
August	Lynn Kohlman	
September	Ann Turkel	Norman Eales
October 1	Mercedes Tzankoff	
October 15	Marie Helvin	Hiroshi
November 1		
November 15	Cathee Dahmen	James Wedge
December	Ingrid Boulting	David Anthony

=== 1972 ===
Issue	Cover model	Photographer
January	Pat Cleveland	Barry McKinley
February	Ritva Haikola	David Anthony
March	Anjelica Huston	Barry McKinley
April	Toukie Smith	
May	Patricia Dow	Barry McKinley
June		Norman Eales
July		Helmut Newton
August	Fiona Lewis	Norman Eales
September	Elnora Waring	Norman Eales
October	Moyra Swan	John Bishop
November	Gayle Hunnicut	James Wedge
December	Ingrid Boulting	

=== 1973 ===
Issue	Cover model	Photographer
January	Lauren Bacall	Norman Eales
February	Charlotte Rampling	Barry McKinley
March	Michael York; Hildegard Neil	Brian Duffy
April		Eric Boman
May	Lynn Kohlman	
June	Geschi Fengler	James Wedge
July	Elnora Waring	
August		
September	Lynn Kohlman	
October		
November	Willy van Rooy	Andre Carrara
December	Jan de Villeneuve	Norman Eales

=== 1974 ===
Issue	Cover model	Photographer
January		
February		
March		Norman Eales
April		David Bailey
May	Christiana Steidten	Norman Eales
June	Mary Maciukas	Andre Carrara
July	Fiona Lewis	Andre Carrara
August		
September		Alex Chatelain
October	Mary Maciukas	
November	Nancy North	Terence Donovan
December		

=== 1975 ===
Issue	Cover model	Photographer
January		
February	Christiana Steidten	
March	Judy Greenway	Claude Virgin
April	Mary Louise Weller	
May	Gunilla Bergström	François Lamy
June	Gunilla Bergström	
July	Kari-Ann Moller	Clive Arrowsmith
August		Packy Cannon
September	Willy van Rooy	Lothar Schmid
October		Clive Arrowsmith
November	Cheryl Tiegs	Norman Eales
December	Carrie Nygren	François Lamy

=== 1976 ===
Issue	Cover model	Photographer
January	Carrie Nygren	François Lamy
February	Sayoko Yamaguchi	Clive Arrowsmith
March		Packy Cannon
April		
May	Vibeke Knudsen	François Lamy
June		François Lamy
July	Shelley Smith	Eric Boman
August		Eric Boman
September		Clive Arrowsmith
October	Rachel Ward	Clive Arrowsmith
November	Suzy Kent	Terence Donovan
December	Karen Holstein	Clive Arrowsmith

=== 1977 ===
Issue	Cover model	Photographer
January	Rachel Ward	Clive Arrowsmith
February	Dayle Haddon	François Lamy
March	Jerry Hall	Jean-Claude Dubois
April	Marie Helvin	David Bailey
May	Eva Malmstörm	François Lamy
June	Marie Helvin	David Bailey
July	Carrie Nygren	François Lamy
August	Moyra Swan	David Bailey
September		Clive Arrowsmith
October	Christiana Steidten	Carlo Effi
November		Tony McGee
December	Rachel Ward	David Bailey

=== 1978 ===
Issue	Cover model	Photographer
January		Jans Francis
February	Susy Dyson	
March		
April	Kristina	Clive Arrowsmith
May	Kelly Le Brock	Clive Arrowsmith
June	Elke Ruge	Clive Arrowsmith
July		François Lamy
August	Kelly Le Brock	Clive Arrowsmith
September	Ginger	Terence Donovan
October	Rachel Ward	Tony McGee
November	Laura Kerr	Tony McGee
December	Marie Helvin	David Bailey

=== 1979 ===
Issue	Cover model	Photographer
January	Vivian Lynn	Clive Arrowsmith
February	Mairi	Knut Bry
March	Eva Nielsen	Norman Parkinson
April	Clare Beserford	Knut Bry
May		Clive Arrowsmith
June	Kelly Winn	Clive Arrowsmith
July	Amanda Pays	Clive Arrowsmith
August	Elizabeth II	Tim Graham
September		Norman Eales
October	Anne Rohart	Alberto dell'Orto
November		Clive Arrowsmith
December	Marianne Lah	Clive Arrowsmith

== 1980s ==
=== 1980 ===
Issue	Cover model	Photographer
January	Geraldine Hemsworth	Alberto dell'Orto
February		Alberto dell'Orto
March	Amanda Pays	John Carter
April	Maria Rudman	Claus Wickrath
May	Yvonne Sporre	Alberto Dell’Orto
June	Geraldine Hemsworth	Claus Wickrath
July		Alberto Dell’Orto
August	The Queen Mother	
September	Amanda Pays	
October	Anne Bezamat	
November	Clare Beresford	
December	Leza Cruz	Alberto Dell’Orto

=== 1981 ===
Issue	Cover model	Photographer
January	Carey Lowell	Claus Wickrath
February	Darcy	
March	Darcy	Alberto Dell'Ort
April	Anne Neil	Tony McGee
May	Lori Singer	Susan Shacter
June	Bridget Yorke	Tony McGee
July		Sandra Lousada
August	Lori Singer	Alberto Dell'Orto
September	Paulina Porizkova	Alvarez
October	Flora	
November	Kathy Coulter	Tony McGee
December		Alberto Dell’Orto

=== 1982 ===
Issue	Cover model	Photographer
January	Kathy Coulter	Alberto Dell’Orto
February		Alberto Dell’Orto
March	Leslie Hardy	Alvarez
April	Laetitia Firmin-Didot	Alvarez
May	Ty Hendrick	Alvarez
June	Deanna Fuller	Marc Hispard
July	Jerry Hall	David Bailey
August	Ingrid Haverkate	David Bailey
September	Patty Owen	Francesco Scavullo
October	Jennifer Ciesar	Nick Jarvis
November	Clair Glover	Marc Hispard
December	Mary Matthews	Marc Hispard

=== 1983 ===
Issue	Cover model	Photographer
January	Arielle Burgelin	Marc Hispard
February	Kathy Ireland	Francesco Scavullo
March	Sophie Ward	David Bailey
April	Annabel Schofield	David Bailey
May	Isabelle Townsend	Paul Lange
June	Christine Bolster	Marc Hispard
July	Sophie Ward	Clive Arrowsmith
August	Judy Macini	Clive Arrowsmith
September	Joanne Russell	Tony McGee
October	Anette Dahlgren	Clive Arrowsmith
November	Catherine Oxenburg	Clive Arrowsmith
December	Laetitia Firmin-Didot	John Swannell

=== 1984 ===
Issue	Cover model	Photographer
January	Ashley Richardson	Marc Hispard
February	Andie MacDowell	Francesco Scavullo
March	Catrina Skepper	David Bailey
April	Yasmin Le Bon	Clive Arrowsmith
May	Patricia Van Ryckeghem	Rudi Molacek
June	Lucy Stupakoff	
July	Jean Pelton	Nick Jarvis
August	Andie MacDowell	Rudi Molacek
September	Lauren Helm	Rudi Molacek
October	Andie MacDowell	
November	Cathy Gallagher	Derry Moore
December	Tatjana Patitz	Rudi Molacek

=== 1985 ===
Issue	Cover model	Photographer
January	Charity Sweedberg	Rudi Molacek
February	Maria von Hartz	Rudi Molacek
March	Joanne Booth	Rudi Molacek
April	Tatjana Patitz	Wayne Stamblem
May	Kristen McMenamy	Barry Dunn
June	Hester Wentzel	Pamela Hanson
July	Isabelle Townsend	Giles Bensimon
August	Joanne Booth	John Swannell
September	Charlotte Norton Morgan	Rudi Molacek
October	Susie Bick	Carrie Branovan
November	Susie Bick	Carrie Branovan
December	Cindy Crawford	Rudi Molacek

=== 1986 ===
Issue	Cover model	Photographer
January	Carol Schwartz	Stevie Hughes
February	Louise Kelly	Stevie Hughes
March	Louise Kelly	
April	Jacki Adams	Carrie Branovan
May	Mak Gilchrist	Stevie Hughes
June	Paulina Porizkova	Stevie Hughes
July	Jerry Hall	Rudi Molacek
August	Fanny	Ian Thomas
September		Rudi Molacek
October	Renée Simonsen	Stevie Hughes
November	Yasmin Le Bon	Ian Thomas
December	Laetitia Firmin-Didot	Kim Knott

=== 1987 ===
Issue	Cover model	Photographer
January	Uma Thurman	Paul Lange
February	Alison Cohn	Kim Knott
March	Charlotte Norton Morgan	Kim Knott
April	Mak Gilchrist	Kim Knott
May	Isabelle Townsend	Perry Odgen
June	Inès de la Fressange	Kim Knott
July	Laetitia Firmin-Didot	Kim Knott
August	Rebecca Ghiglieri	Martin Brading
September	Sara Kapp	Andrew Macpherson
October	Marpessa Hennink	Andrew Macpherson
November	Maria Johnson	Terence Donovan
December	Kristen McMenamy	Javier Vallhonrat

=== 1988 ===
Issue	Cover model	Photographer
January	Therese Bachy	David Seidner
February	Marine Delterme	David Seidner
March	Carine Holties	Robert Erdmann
April	Claire Dhelens	Robert Erdmann
May	Claire Dhelens	Barry Dunne
June	Janette Williams	Robert Erdmann
July	Marielle MacVille	Robert Erdmann
August	Linda Evangelista	Andrew MacPherson
September	Janette Williams	Robert Erdmann
October	Kim Williams	Robert Erdmann
November	Rosanne Blair	Angus McBean
December	Yasmin Le Bon	Barry Lategan

=== 1989 ===
Issue	Cover model	Photographer
January	Laetitia Roversi	Barry Lategan
February	Stephen Jones	Robert Erdmann
March	Marie-Sophie Wilson	Perry Ogden
April	Rosanna Blair	Martin Brading
May	Larissa Fielding	Terence Donovan
June	Cecilia Chancellor	Mario Testino
July	Lucie de la Falaise	Martin Brading
August	Nataly Charles	Richard Lohr
September	Amanda Pays	
October	Lisa Uphill	Mario Testino
November	Charlotte Flossaut-Pelle	Mario Testino
December	Cecilia Chancellor	Mario Testino

== 1990s ==
=== 1990 ===
Issue	Cover model	Photographer
January	Jeny Howarth	Mario Testino
February	Odile Broulard	William Garrett
March	Meryl Streep	Brigitte Lacombe
April	Fabienne Terwinghe	Kim Knott
May	Yasmin Le Bon	Avi Meroz
June	Lucy Cunningham	François Halard
July	Julia Christie	Brigitte Lacombe
August	Alison Doody	David Bailey
September	Nynne Rosenkrantz	Cindy Palmano
October	Isabella Rossellini	Rico Puhlmann
November	Julie Anderson	Mario Testino
December	Susie Bick	Julian Broad

=== 1991 ===
Issue	Cover model	Photographer
January	Princess Diana	Jayne Fincher
February	Jane Fonda	Michael Robert
March	Gail Elliott	
April	Julia Roberts	Matthew Rolston
May	Greta Scacchi	Robert Barber
June	Lisa Barbuscia	Julian Broad
July	Tatum O'Neal	Aaron Rapoport
August	Meg Ryan	
September		Kate Garner
October	Carla Bruni	Mario Testino
November	Viviana Durante	Julian Broad
December	Saffron Aldridge	Julian Broad

=== 1992 ===
Issue	Cover model	Photographer
January	Fanny Ardant	Julian Broad
February	Lisa Butcher	Richard Lohr
March	Barbara Moors	Stefano Massimo
April	Jane March	Michael Roberts
May	Emmanuelle Béart	Michael Roberts
June	Victoria Spencer; Kitty Spencer	Eamonn J. McCabe
July	Nelly Schamey Pakh	François Halard
August	Tanya Buchanan	
September	Naomi Campbell	Michael Williams
October	Kate Moss	Michael Roberts
November	Sienna Guilleroy	Mike Owen
December	Yasmeen Ghauri	Brad Branson

=== 1993 ===
Issue	Cover model	Photographer
January	Amber Valletta	
February	Keri Claussen	Francesco Scavullo
March	Kati Tastet	Nick Briggs
April	Cecilia Chancellor	Bard Branson
May	Magali Amadei	Peggy Sirota
June	Vanessa Duve	Peggy Sirota
July	Kim Renneberg	
August	Anja Kneller	
September	Kristen McMenamy	Francesco Scavullo
October	Kate Moss	Thierry LeGoues
November	Naomi Campbell	Claud Wickrath
December	Patricia Arquette	Toni Meneguzzo

=== 1994 ===
Issue	Cover model	Photographer
January	Yasmin Le Bon	Regan Cameron
February	Vanessa Duve	
March	Milla Jovovich	Peggy Sirota
April	Karen Mulder	Tyen
May	Sarah O'Hare	
June	Bridget Hall	
July	Claudia Mason	
August	Meg Ryan	
September	Meghan Douglas	Eamon J. McCabe
October	Larissa Bondarenko	
November	Kristin Scott Thomas	
December	Sophie Ward	Platon

=== 1995 ===
Issue	Cover model	Photographer
January	Amanda Pays	Matthew Rolston
February	Diane Lane	
March	Chiara Mastoianni	André Rau
April	Olga Pantushenkova	
May	Emily Lloyd	
June	Jodie Kidd	
July	Georgia Goettmann	
August	Joanna Rhodes	
September	Catherine Deneuve	
October	Jodie Kidd	Platon
November	Elizabeth Hurley	
December	Famke Janssen	Kim Knott

=== 1996 ===
Issue	Cover model	Photographer
January	Carole Bouquet	André Rau
February	Carré Otis	Patrick Shaw
March	Jade Parfitt	Patrick Shaw
April	Claudia Schiffer	André Rau
May	Cecilia Chancellor	
June	Audrey Hepburn	
July	Jamie Lee Curtis	
August	Yasmin Le Bon	Eamonn J. McCabe
September	Sophie Ward	Eamonn J. McCabe
October	Natalie Portman	
November	Stella Tennant	Neil Davenport
December	Patricia Arquette	Cliff Watts

=== 1997 ===
Issue	Cover model	Photographer
January	Sigourney Weaver	Andrew Southam
February	Andie MacDowell	
March	Winona Ryder	
April	Juliette Binoche	
May	Isabella Rossellini	Brigitte Lacombe
June	Louise Lombard	
July	Carole Bouquet	Marianne Rosenstiehl
August	Melanie Griffith	Richard McLaren
September	Shakira Caine	
October	Molly Sims	
November	Meg Ryan	Walter Chin
December	Darcey Bussell	

=== 1998 ===
Issue	Cover model	Photographer
January	Teri Hatcher	Richard McLaren
February	Kim Basinger	
March	Heather Payne	
April	Shirley Mallmann	
May	Catherine McCormick	
June	Beri Smither	
July	Karen Ferrari	
August	Kristin Scott Thomas	Patrick Demarchelier
September	Veronica Varekova	Walter Chin
October	Kristina Semenovskaia	
November	Cameron Diaz	
December	Jerry Hall; Elizabeth Jagger	David Bailey

=== 1999 ===
Issue	Cover model	Photographer
January	Cindy Crawford	Andrew Southam
February	Claire Forlani	
March	Diane Kruger	Clarence KlingeBeil
April	Joanna Lumley	
May	Madonna	Patrick Demarchelier
June	Michelle Pfeiffer	Michael Thompson
July	Jude Law; Sadie Frost	
August	Chandra North	David Bailey
September	Honor Fraser	
October	Marilyn Monroe	
November	Laura Bailey	David Bailey
December		

== 2000s ==
=== 2000 ===
Issue	Cover model	Photographer
January	Lady Helen Troy	
February	Kirsty Hume	David Bailey
March	Elsa Benitez	
April	Justine Waddell	
May	Normandy Keith	
June	Joely Richardson	
July	Connie Nielsen	Andrew Southam
August	Carolina Bittencourt	Christopher Micaud
September	Dessi & Alexandra Pavlova	Christopher Micaud
October	Claire Danes	
November	Laetitia Casta	
December	Elle MacPherson	

=== 2001 ===
Issue	Cover model	Photographer
January	Christy Turlington	Jez Smith
February	Kate Beckinsale	
March	Cate Blanchett	
April	Rachel Weisz	Lorenzo Aguis
May	Yasmin Le Bon	
June	Sarah Jessica Parker	
July	Molly Sims	Glynn Smith
August	Fernanda Tavares	David Bailey
September	Sophie Ellis-Bextor	Lee Strickland
October	Saffron Burrows	David Bailey
November	Nicole Kidman	Patrick Demarchelier
December	Jodie Kidd	David Bailey

=== 2002 ===
Issue	Cover model	Photographer
January	Kristin Davis	Walter Chin
February	Julianne Moore	Cliff Watts
March	Gwyneth Paltrow	Patrick Demarchelier
April	Jade Parfitt; Karen Elson; Erin Connor	Walter Chin
May	Meg Ryan	Patrick Demarchelier
June	Kate Moss	Sølve Sundsbø
July	Talisa Soto	Diego Uchitel
August	Ana Beatriz Barros	
September	Hilary Swank	Diego Uchitel
October	Kirsty Hume	
November	Thandie Newton	Diego Uchitel
December	Sophie Ellis Bextor	Mary McCartney Donald

=== 2003 ===
Issue	Cover model	Photographer
January	Milla Jovovich	Sheryl Nields
February	Julianne Moore	Diego Uchitel
March	Ralph Fiennes; Natascha Mcelhone	Mary McCartney Donald
April	Delfine Bafort	David Burton
May	Rosamund Pike	
June	Kemp Muhl	Don Cunningham
July	Alessandro Ambrosio	
August	Rachel Weisz	Lorenzo Agius
September	Kristin Scott Thomas	Rankin
October	Lily Donaldson	
November	Morgan Quinn	Clarence KlingBeil
December	Keira Knightley	Rankin

=== 2004 ===
Issue	Cover model	Photographer
January	Olivia Williams	Lorenzo Aguis
February	Valentin Zeliaeva	Clarence K
March	Beyoncé Knowles	Cliff Watts
April	Lou Doillon	David Burton
May	Jaquetta Wheeler	Ralph Mecke
June	Sophie Dahl	
July	Liz Hurley	John Swannell
August	Vivien Solari	Cliff Watts
September	Liya Kebede	
October	Emily Mortimer	Ralph Mecke
November	Gisele Bündchen	Peter Lindbergh
December	Gwen Stefani	Lorenzo Aguis

=== 2005 ===
Issue	Cover model	Photographer
January	Diane Kruger	
February	Scarlett Johansson	
March	Sophie Dahl	Ralph Mecke
April	Jamelia	Ralph Meckie
May	Brooke Shields	
June	Eva Green	
July	Filippa Hamilton	Diego Uchitel
August	Elyse Taylor	Diego Uchitel
September	Jennifer Connelly	Lorenzo Agius
October	Brittany Murphy	Ellis Parrinder
November	Madonna	Lorenzo Agius
December	Micha Barton	Kayt Jones

=== 2006 ===
Issue	Cover model	Photographer
January	Michelle Buswell	
February	Saffron Burrows	Kayt Jones
March	Cate Blanchett	Norman Jean Roy
April	Flávia De Oliveira	Satoshi Saïkusa
May	Liv Tyler	Norman Jean Roy
June	Thandie Newton	Ralph Mecke
July	Liberty Ross	Kayt Jones
August	Kate Bosworth	Norman Jean Roy
September	Erin Wasson	Alexei Hay
October	Beyoncé	Alexei Hay
November	Diane Kruger	Ralph Mecke
December	Cameron Russell	Satoshi Saïkusa

=== 2007 ===
Issue	Cover model	Photographer
January	Sienna Miller	Alexei Hay
February	Rachel Weisz	Alexei Hay
March	Naomi Watts	Satoshi Saïkusa
April	Joss Stone	Mary McCartney
May	Elena Melink	Philippe Cometti
June	Christy Turlington	Alexei Hay
July	Luca Gadjus	
August	Thandie Newton	Alexei Hay
September	Georgia Frost	Alexei Hay
October	Gisele Bündchen	Alexei Hay
November	Cate Blanchett	Richard Bailey
December	Hilary Rhoda	Michelangelo Di Battista

=== 2008 ===
Issue	Cover model	Photographer
January	Franziska Frank	Alexei Hay
February	Leona Lewis	Ralph Mecke
March	Gisele Bündchen	Michelangelo Di Battista
April	Miranda Kerr	Michelangelo Di Battista
May	Liya Kebede	Alexei Hay
June	Bianca Balti	Satoshi Saïkusa
July	Masha Novoselova	Michelangelo Di Battista
August	Kim Noorda	Cometti
September	Sophie Dahl	Alexei Hay
October	Liv Tyler	Cliff Watts
November	Stephanie Seymour	Paola Kudacki
December	Angelina Jolie	Max Vadukul

=== 2009 ===
Issue	Cover model	Photographer
January	Kate Hudson	Cliff Watts
February	Jennifer Connelly	Paola Kudacki
March	Emily Blunt	Paola Kudacki
April	Masha Novoselova	Mari Sarai
May	Alexa Chung	Guy Aroch
June	January Jones	Paola Kudacki
July	Uma Thurman	Alexi Lubomirski
August	Rachel Weisz	Cliff Watts
September	Natalia Vodianova	Paola Kudacki
October	Lily Cole	Guy Aroch
November	Claudia Schiffer	Michelangelo Di Battista
December	Victoria Beckham	Alexi Lubomirski

== 2010s ==
=== 2010 ===
Issue	Cover model	Photographer
January	Scarlett Johansson	Alexi Lubomirski
February	Julianne Moore	Paola Kudacki
March	Cindy Crawford	Cedric Buchet
April	Megan Fox	Paola Kudacki
May	Jennifer Aniston	Alexi Lubomirski
June	Cheryl Cole	Alexi Lubomirski
July	Vanessa Paradis	Cedric Buchet
August	Marion Cotillard	Cedric Buchet
September	Gisele Bündchen	Cedric Buchet
October	Karen Elson	Alexi Lubomirski
November	Renée Zellweger	Alexi Lubomirski
December	Natalia Vodianova	Michelangelo Di Battista

=== 2011 ===
Issue	Cover model	Photographer
January	Emily Blunt	Paola Kudacki
February	Rebecca Hall	Alexi Lubomirski
March	Gwyneth Paltrow	Alexi Lubomirski
April	Eva Herzigová	Michelangelo Di Battista
May	Kate Moss	Sølve Sundsbø
June	Eva Green	Camilla Åkrans
July	Claudia Schiffer	Horst Diekgerdes
August	Emma Watson	Alexi Lubomirski
September	Beyoncé	Alexi Lubomirski
October	Alexa Chung	Ellen von Unwerth
November	Kate Winslet	Tom Munro
December	Yasmin Le Bon; Helena Christensen; Cindy Crawford; Naomi Campbell; Eva Herzigová	Jonas Åkerlund

=== 2012 ===
Issue	Cover model	Photographer
January	Rosie Huntington-Whiteley	Tom Munro
February	Uma Thurman	Mark Seliger
March	Georgia May Jagger	Alexi Lubomirski
April	Cate Blanchett	Alexi Lubomirski
May	Victoria Beckham	Camilla Åkrans
June	Cameron Diaz	Tom Munro
July	Florence Welch	Camilla Åkrans
August	Miranda Kerr	Giampaolo Sgura
September	Keira Knightley	Ellen von Unwerth
October	Joan Smalls; Laetitia Casta	Sebastian Faena
November	Salma Hayek	Paola Kudacki
December	Marion Cotillard	Ben Hassett

=== 2013 ===
Issue	Cover model	Photographer
January	Sienna Miller	David Slijper
February	Anne Hathaway	David Slijper
March	Rachel Weisz	David Slijper
April	Kate Winslet	Alexi Lubomirski
May	Karen Elson	Alexi Lubomirski
June	Carey Mulligan	Tom Allen
July	Stella Tennant	Cathleen Naundorf
August	Michelle Dockery	David Slijper
September	Natalia Vodianova	Jean-Baptiste Mondino
October	Scarlett Johansson	Alexi Lubomirski
November	Jennifer Lawrence	Ben Hassett
December	Cate Blanchett	Ben Hassett

=== 2014 ===
Issue	Cover model	Photographer
January	Christy Turlington	Alexi Lubomirski
February	Keira Knightley	Alexi Lubomirski
March	Rosie Huntington-Whiteley	Karl Lagerfeld
April	Sarah Jessica Parker	Alexi Lubomirski
May	Kirsten Dunst	David Slijper
June	Miranda Kerr	Alexi Lubomirski
July	Emily Blunt	Alexi Lubomirski
August	Michelle Dockery	Alexi Lubomirski
September	Rosie Huntington-Whiteley	David Slijper
October	Claire Danes	Alexi Lubomirski
November	Jessica Chastain	David Slijper
December	Carey Mulligan	Alexi Lubomirski

=== 2015 ===
Issue	Cover model	Photographer
January	Reese Witherspoon	Alexi Lubomirski
February	Gwyneth Paltrow	Alexi Lubomirski
March	Kate Winslet	Alexi Lubomirski
April	Margot Robbie	David Slijper
May	Lupita Nyong'o	Alexi Lubomirski
June	Kristen Stewart	Alexi Lubomirski
July	Alexa Chung	David Slijper
August	Naty Chabanenko	Erik Madigan Heck
September	Rosie Huntington-Whiteley	Alexi Lubomirski
October	Michelle Dockery	David Slijper
November	Rachel Weisz	Tom Craig
December	Lily James	Thomas Schenk

=== 2016 ===
Issue	Cover model	Photographer
January	Alicia Vikander	Alexi Lubomirski
February	Cate Blanchett	Norman Jean Roy
March	Nicole Kidman	Norman Jean Roy
April	Robin Wright	David Slijper
May	Daria Werbowy	Nico Bustos
June	Helena Bonham Carter	Tom Craig
July	Emilia Clarke	David Slijper
August	Alicia Burke; Ash Foo; Leila Nda; Tiana Tolstoi; Mari Halang	Erik Madigan Heck
September	Rosie Huntington-Whiteley	Alexi Lubomirski
October	Mariacarla Boscono	Nico Bustos
November	Felicity Jones	David Slijper
December	Keira Knightley	Alexi Lubomirski

=== 2017 ===
Issue	Cover model	Photographer
January	Nastya Sten	Agata Pospieszynska
February	Claire Danes	Alexi Lubomirski
March	Sam Rollinson	Agata Pospieszynska
April	Sienna Miller	Alexi Lubomirski
May	Lindsey Wixson	Erik Madigan Heck
June	Karen Elson	Richard Phibbs
July	Ashley Graham	Alexi Lubomirski
August	Lara Mullen; Irina Kravchenko; Ling Chen; Polina Oganicheva; Malaika Firth	Erik Madigan Heck
September	Kristen Stewart	Tom Craig
October	Rachel Weisz	Agata Pospieszynska
November	Julia Roberts	Alexi Lubomirski
December	Jodie Foster	Richard Phibbs
December	Kate Winslet	Alexi Lubomirski
December	Ruth Negga	Agata Pospieszynska

=== 2018 ===
Issue	Cover model	Photographer
January	Carey Mulligan	Richard Phibbs
February	Michelle Williams	Agata Pospieszynska
March	Rosie Huntington-Whiteley	Agata Pospieszynska
April	Lily James	Richard Phibbs
May	Bibi Abdulkadir; Charlotte Lindvig; Saska Ingham	Agata Pospieszynska
June	Vanessa Kirby	Alexi Lubomirski
July	Serena Williams	Richard Phibbs
August	Ashley Graham	Alexi Lubomirski
September	Cameron Russell	Will Davidson
October	Cate Blanchett	Will Davidson
November	Maartje Verhoef	Josh Shinner
December	Florence Pugh	Josh Shinner
December	Gemma Arterton; Kristin Scott Thomas; Nicole Atieno	Richard Phibbs
December	Keira Knightley	Tom Craig

=== 2019 ===
Issue	Cover model	Photographer
January	Emily Blunt	Richard Phibbs
February	Saoirse Ronan	Erik Madigan Heck
March	Lily James	Alexi Lubomirski
April	Jenna Coleman	David Slijper
May	Sophie Turner	Richard Phibbs
June	Rosie Huntington-Whiteley	Alexi Lubomirski
July	Ashley Graham	Pamela Hanson
August	Mélodie Vaxelaire; Heather Kemesky; Demy de Vries	Agata Pospieszynska
September	Natalie Portman	Pamela Hanson
October	Kristen Stewart	Alexi Lubomirski
November	Olivia Colman	Alexi Lubomirski
December	Cate Blanchett	Tom Munro
December	Jorja Smith	Richard Phibbs
December	Ruth Wilson	Richard Phibbs
December	Helena Bonham Carter	Pamela Hanson

== 2020s ==
=== 2020 ===
Issue	Cover model	Photographer
January	Gemma Arterton	Richard Phibbs
February	Victoria Beckham	Ellen Von Unwerth
March	Emily Blunt	Pamela Hanson
April	Gugu Mbatha-Raw	Richard Phibbs
May	Léa Seydoux	Alexi Lubomirski
June	Rachel Weisz	Pamela Hanson
July	Ashley Graham	Justin Ervin
August	Olympia Campbell	Jesse John Jenkins
September	Rihanna	Gray Sorrenti
October	Marion Cotillard	Serge Leblon
November	Lily James	Agata Pospieszynska
December	Gillian Anderson; Daisy Edgar-Jones; Lashana Lynch	Richard Phibbs

=== 2021 ===
Issue	Cover model	Photographer
January	Lucan Gillespie	Agata Pospieszynska
February	Iman	Paola Kudacki
March	Carey Mulligan	Quentin Jones
April	Vanessa Kirby	Josh Shinner
May	Constance Jablonski	Betina du Toit
June	Francesca Hayward	Jesse Jenkins
July	Keira Knightley	Boo George
August	Molly Constable, Seynabou Cissé	Pamela Hanson
September	Natalia Vodianova	Cedric Bihr
October	Beyoncé	Campbell Addy
November	Phoebe Dynevor	Josh Shinner
December/January 2022	Claire Foy	Erik Madigan Heck
December/January 2022	Jodie Comer	Agata Pospieszynska
December/January 2022	Cynthia Erivo	Alexi Lubomirski
December/January 2022	Sarah Snook	Alexi Lubomirski

=== 2022 ===
Issue	Cover model	Photographer
February	Karen Elson	Erik Madigan Heck
March	Cara Delevingne	Pamela Hanson
April	Venus Williams, Serena Williams	Renell Medrano
April	Harris Reed	Philip Sinden
May	Alicia Vikander	Betina du Toit
June	Rose Leslie	Alexi Lubomirski
July/August	Birgit Kos	Yulia Gorbachenko
September	Gemma Chan	Josh Shinner
October	Florence Pugh	John Edmonds
November	Cate Blanchett	Kristian Schuller
December/January 2023	Anya Taylor-Joy	Georges Antoni
December/January 2023	Viola Davis	Alexi Lubomirski
December/January 2023	Maude Apatow	Josh Shinner
December/January 2023	Little Simz	Camilla Akrans
December/January 2023	Lauren Wasser	Richard Phibbs

=== 2023 ===
Issue	Cover model	Photographer
February	Lucy Boynton, Shalom Brune-Franklin, Sheila Atim	Pamela Hanson
March	Luna Bijl	Betina du Toit
April	Keira Knightley	Betina du Toit
May	Elle Fanning	Alexi Lubomirski
June	Vanessa Kirby	Betina du Toit
July/August	Emily Blunt	Tom Schirmacher
September	Soo Joo Park	Boo George
October	Saoirse Ronan	Agata Pospieszynska
October	Doja Cat	Mario Sorrenti
October	"By Your Side"	Jenya Datsko
October	Coco Chanel	François Kollar
November	Pooja Mor	Boo George
December/January 2024	Emilia Clarke	Betina du Toit
December/January 2024	Gugu Mbatha-Raw	Helena Christensen
December/January 2024	Emerald Fennell	Josh Shinner
December/January 2024	Janelle Monáe	Shaniqwa Jarvis
December/January 2024	Jenna Ortega	Agata Pospieszynska

=== 2024 ===
Issue	Cover model	Photographer
February	Julianne Moore	David Roemer
March	Maisie Williams	Agata Pospieszynska
April	Léa Seydoux	Alexi Lubomirski
May	Nicola Coughlan	Agata Pospieszynska
June	Jourdan Dunn	Richard Phibbs
July/August	Sienna Miller	Emma Summerton
September	Kate Winslet	Alexi Lubomirski
October	Venus Williams	Richard Phibbs
November	Lupita Nyong’o	Alexi Lubomirski
December/January 2025	Sophie Turner	Emma Summerton
December/January 2025	Ambika Mod	Agata Pospieszynska
December/January 2025	Katarina Johnson-Thompson	Luc Braquet
December/January 2025	Victoria Beckham	Boo George

=== 2025 ===
Issue	Cover model	Photographer
February	Lily-Rose Depp	Karim Sadli
March	Priyanka Chopra	Alexi Lubomirski
April	Rihanna	Luis Alberto Rodriguez
April	Chimamanda Adichie	Emma Summerton
May	Florence Pugh	Erik Madigan Heck
June	Rosamund Pike	Emma Summerton
July/August	Pamela Anderson	Pamela Hanson
September	Mariah Carey	Alexi Lubomirski
October	Dua Lipa	Anthony Seklaoui
November	Jennifer Aniston	Emma Summerton
December/January 2026	Erin Doherty	Agata Pospieszynska
December/January 2026	Jade Thirlwall	Jem Mitchell
December/January 2026	Jodie Turner-Smith	Richard Phibbs
December/January 2026	Reese Witherspoon	Alexi Lubomirski
December/January 2026	Aimee Lou Wood	Pip

=== 2026 ===
Issue	Cover model	Photographer
February	Claire Foy	Agata Pospieszynska
March	Rebecca Ferguson	Erik Madigan Heck
April	Rachel Zegler	Alexi Lubomirski
May	Anne Hathaway	Inez & Vinoodh
June	Jodie Comer	Marcus Ohlsson
July/August	Greta Lee	Olivia Malone
September	Cate Blanchett	Emma Summerton
October	Celine Dion	Robin Galiegue
November	Emma Corrin	Szilveszter Makó

== See also ==
- List of British Vogue cover models
