= Sinopticon =

Chinese science fiction anthology from 2021

- Author: Gu Shi, Han Song, Hao Jingfang, Nian Yu, Wang Jinkang, Zhao Haihong, Tang Fei, Ma Boyong, Anna Wu, A Que, Baoshu, Regina Kanyu Wang and Jiang Bo
- Translator: Xueting Christine Ni
- Language: English
- Genre: Science fiction, Hard science fiction
- Publisher: Solaris
- Publication date: 2021-11-09
- Pages: 448
- ISBN: 9781781088524

Sinopticon (or Sinopticon: A Celebration of Chinese Science Fiction) is a science-fiction anthology edited and translated by Xueting Christine Ni composed of thirteen short stories by different Chinese writers, namely Gu Shi, Han Song, Hao Jingfang, Nian Yu, Wang Jinkang, Zhao Haihong, Tang Fei, Ma Boyong, Anna Wu, A Que, Baoshu, Regina Kanyu Wang and Jiang Bo. It was published by Solaris Books in November 2021.

== Contents ==
- "The Last Save" (最终档案) by Gu Shi, first published 2013 in Super Nice
- "Tombs of the Universe" (宇宙墓碑) by Han Song, first published 1991 in Illusion SF
- "Qiankun and Alex" (乾坤和亚⼒) by Hao Jingfang, first published 2017 in Mirror of Man
- "Cat's Chance in Hell" (九死⼀⽣) by Nian Yu, first published 2018 by Liaoning Publishing Group
- "The Return of Adam" (亚当回归) by Wang Jinkang, first published 1993 in Science Fiction World
- "Rendezvous: 1937" (相聚在⼀九三七) by Zhao Haihong, first published 2006 in World Science Fiction
- "The Heart of the Museum" (博物馆之⼼) by Tang Fei, first published 2018 by Shanghai Literature and Arts Publishing
- "The Great Migration" (⼤冲运) by Ma Boyong, first published 2021
- "Meisje met de Parel" (戴珍珠⽿环的少⼥) by Anna Wu, first published 2013 in New Science Fiction
- "Flower of the Other Shore" (彼岸花) by A Que, first published 2018 on Kedou
- "The Absolute Experiment" (特赦实验) by Baoshu, first published 2021 in Super Nice
- "The Tide of Moon City" (⽉⻅潮) by Regina Kanyu Wang, first published 2016 in Mengya
- "Starship: Library" (宇宙尽头的书店) by Jiang Bo, first published 2015 in Science Fiction World

== Background ==
"Tombs of the Universe" was published in 1991 in Taiwan and only ten years later in Mainland China as publishers found Han Song's tone too dark.

"The Return of Adam" was Wang Jinkang's first short story and made up for his 10-year-old son.

== Reception ==
=== Reviews ===
Publishers Weekly wrote that "Xueting showcases the depth and breadth of Chinese sci-fi ... in this superior anthology that demonstrates the deep well of talent to be found beyond big names such as Liu Cixin." Its short stories "couch universal themes of the genre ... in elements unique to Chinese identity, culture, and history." Although "every entry is high-quality", Han Song's "Tombs of the Universe" and Gu Shi's "The Last Save" are "among the most memorable." Furthermore, Xueting's "concise but detailed introduction and thoughtful story notes provide helpful context." In summary, the "masterful result validates Xueting's endeavor—and will only whet readers' appetite for more translations."

Shannon Fay wrote on Strange Horizons, that Xueting "does a good job ... of preserving the tone and style of each author, and extols their talents (or in some cases, defends their foibles) in an afterword that follows each story", which is important for the Chinese background, because "while there might be stories here featuring familiar motifs, there are also stories that touch on themes you wouldn't usually see in an anthology full of Western writers." Concerning the short stories, "nearly every story here has something unique to offer" and even though "not all of the stories have a happy ending", "there's a general feeling of goodwill that comes through."

Adam Robbins writes in The World of Chinese that "each story builds a world of its own; indeed, each could justify a review of its own" and that "each author's distinct voice shines through, dreamy or hard-boiled in their tone, minute or cosmic in their scope." In summary, "these well-chosen stories give a sense of the riches that await once other translators take up the challenge to bring more of the genre into English. Despite having their own distinct cultural tradition, China's writers create worlds with concerns and technologies that should be relatable to any reader."

=== Awards ===
"The Return of Adam" won the Galaxy Award in 1993.

== See also ==
- Invisible Planets and Broken Stars, other anthologies of Chinese science fiction
