= He Xi =

Science fiction writer

He Xi (Chinese 何夕, Pinyin Hé Xī; * born December 1971 in Chengdu, Sichuan Province, People's Republic of China), born as He Hongwei (Chinese 何宏伟, Pinyin Hé Hóngwěi), is a Chinese science fiction author. He has won the Galaxy Award fifteen times and is part of the 'great four' or 'four heavenly kings' ("本土科幻四大天王") of Chinese science fiction (together with Liu Cixin, Wang Jingkang and Han Song).

== Biography ==
After a comeback in 1998, He Xi officially changed his name from He Hongwei to He Xi. He (Xi) took the pun "今夕何夕" (Pinyin jīnxī hé xī, Tonight: He Xi) from the Etsujin Song (Chinese 越人歌, Pinyin yuè rén gē) as basis and argued it better fits him wondering about the eternal flow of time (顺带抒发自己面对时间这个永恒命题时的迷惑).

== Bibliography ==
- 光恋, guāng liàn [Light Love], won second place at the Galaxy Award 1992.
- 电脑魔王, diànnǎo mówáng [Computer Devil], won third place at the Galaxy Award 1993.
- 小雨, xiǎoyǔ [Little Rain]
- 异域, yìyù [Exotic] (1999), won the Galaxy Award 1999.
- 爱别离, ài biélí [Love is Over] (1999), won the Galaxy Award 2000.
- 六道众生, liùdào zhòngshēng [Six Feeling Beings], published in 2001, won the Galaxy Award 2002.
- 伤心者, shāngxīn zhě [The Heart-Broken], published in 2002, won the Galaxy Award 2003.
- 天生我材, tiānshēng wǒ cái [Innate Talent], published in 2004, won the Galaxy Award 2005.
- 十亿年后的来客, shí yì nián hòu de láikè [The Traveller from a billion years], published in 2008, won the Galaxy Award 2009.
- 人生不相见, rénshēng bù xiāngjiàn [„No Sign of Life"], published in 2009, won the Galaxy Award 2010.
- 汪洋战争, wāngyáng zhànzhēng [„War on the Ocean"], published in February 2012 in Science Fiction World, won the Galaxy Award 2012.
- 浮生, fúshēng [Floating Life], won the 2017 Nebula Award for best short story and the 2017 Galaxy Award.
- Life Does Not Allow Us to Meet (2023), a finalist for the Hugo Award for Best Novella in 2024.
