= The Redemption of Time =

2011 science fiction novel by Baoshu

- Author: Baoshu
- Translator: Ken Liu
- Language: Chinese
- Genre: Science fiction, Hard science fiction
- Publisher: Chongqing Publishing House
- Publication date: 2011
- Pages: 272
- ISBN: 978-1788542227

The Redemption of Time (Chinese: 观想之宙, Pinyin: Guān Xiǎng Zhī Zhòu, lit. 'Aeon of Contemplation') is a science fiction novel by Chinese writer Baoshu (pen name of Li Jun). It was written in just three weeks as a fan fiction to continue the events of the Remembrance of Earth's Past trilogy by Liu Cixin following the publication of its last installment Death's End in November 2010. It was later published with Liu Cixin's allowance as a novel by Chongqing Press in China in 2011, as Three-Body X: Aeon of Contemplation (Chinese: 三体X·观想之宙; pinyin: Sān Tǐ X · Guān Xiǎng Zhī Zhòu) and launched Baoshu's career as a writer. It was translated by Ken Liu into English for Tor Books and published on July 16, 2019, as The Redemption of Time.

The novel gained a controversial status among fans compared to the original trilogy, especially regarding whether the book's plot was canonical. Neither Liu Cixin nor Chongqing Press have made any statement, but Baoshu himself writes in the foreword of the novel that he makes "no claim" whether the novel "constitutes a part of the Three-Body canon" and that he imagines it "as a dedicated fan's attempt to explain and fill out some of the gaps of in the original trilogy."

== Plot ==
After the expansion of the death lines and the fall of system DX3906 into a black domain with a reduced speed of light, Yun Tianming and 艾 AA are left alone on planet Blue. The Hunter, with Cheng Xin and Guan Yifan, is still in orbit and can only land in millions of years due to relativistic time dilation. Yun Tianming tells 艾 AA what happened after his deep frozen brain was intercepted by the Trisolaran fleet.

Based on their study of his brain, the Trisolarans build a system called cloud computing allowing them to lie and almost ruining their entire economy, for which essential information was saved in their brains. Yun Tianming refuses cooperation and is tortured, for example by experiencing cannibalism, which the Trisolarans consider natural, or experiencing decades in his own mind, which he uses to invent countless fairy tales as he did with a girl called Ai Xiaowei in his childhood. 艾 AA remarks he met her again at the United Nations when buying DX3906 and reveals herself to be a clone of Ai Xiaowei. Yun Tianming eventually realizes, after a suicide attempt, to be in a simulation and agrees to help the Trisolarans. He proposes altering scientific results sent to Earth during the Deterrence Era to block human progress, but proposes changes, which can be deduced to be nonsense from pure theory alone, in an attempt to doublecross the Trisolarans and warn humanity about their new ability to deceive. He also creates art, including the design of Sophon, for the cultural exchange, which he also uses to hide warnings. None are recognized by humans.

Yun Tianming admits to have given away the best chance, which was saving Cheng Xin from being murdered by Thomas Wade by ordering the Trisolarans to change his vision with the sophons. He explains it the same way as he did for the Trisolarans when Cheng Xin failed as a Swordholder, that it was an act of love. Then, a supernatural entity from the late universe passed by the Trisolaran Fleet. It reveals to him the truth about the Trisolarans, which is their tiny size of a grain of rice. He uses "idea abstractions" (which evidently could not work for the Trisolarans), and recruits him for an even larger war against an ancient being known as the Lurker which compactified previous dimensions.

Sixty years later, 艾 AA has died of old age. Yun Tianming digs her a grave and commits suicide, before realizing that the supernatural entity had given him an immortal spirit living on. He enters the pocket universe 647 and meets Sophon, who reveals that the Lurker actually tore down spacial dimensions to create time, which has not existed in the original universe. Yun Tianming travels through the universe and destroys helpers of the lurker, including the home world of Singer, who destroyed the Solar System. He gets support by Helena (from the prologue of Death's End), who also met a supernatural entity inside the four-dimensional fragment, and whose immortal spirit lived on after her death. She sacrifices her life to stop the Lurker. Cheng Xin and Guan Yifan leave pocket universe 647 and are greeted by Yun Tianming and a new clone of 艾 AA with all her memories. Sophon reveals to Cheng Xin, that the five kilograms she left behind will indeed alter the new universe after the Big Crunch.

In this new universe, the Trisolaran system is stable with one small star in orbit around the two larger others and the aliens living there being completely different. Red Coast Base was terminated without result, Shi Qiang dies in the Sino-Vietnamese War and Cheng Xin is a boy being adopted by Zhang Yuanchao. Sophon visits the reincarnation of Yun Tianming in his apartment in Beijing and due to his incredible genius in the last universe, trusts him with the task of telling the new universe about everything that happened. She calls him Liu Cixin, which is his new name in the new universe. Liu Cixin then begins to write down the story of the last universe, beginning with the title of the first book: The Three-Body Problem.

== Reception ==
Han Song thought that "The Redemption of Time reveals that everything becomes a part of a fairy tale in the end; yet, this fairy tale has to carry the ultimate meaning of life and the universe." Pan Haitian claimed the novel was "a thrilling, fascinating new adventure to uncover more mysteries of the Three Body World." Liu Waitong found it "a highly imaginative alternate world within the bounds of Liu Cixin’s creation", which "encapsulates the bountifulness and timeless beauty of the universe."

Kirkus Reviews made a few comparisons to other novels and writers, claiming the "entities at odds since the beginning of time bring to mind the creation story in J.R.R. Tolkien's The Silmarillion", that the "universe-engulfing struggle recalls John C. Wright's astonishing multibook Eschaton saga" and that the "whole has a transcendental quality that might earn a nod from William Blake". Baoshu "writes powerfully about difficult concepts" and "his central thesis [....] is an absolute stunner."

World Literature Today criticized that "vast portions of this book consist of characters telling one another about events—some quite spectacular and important to the story—that happen offstage" and hence "much is told; little is shown." This is a "shame" since the novel "bristles with wondrous spectacle; and its scope exceeds even that of Liu’s trilogy", which "offers much to enjoy and ponder."
