= Galaxy Award =

Galaxy Award may have any of the three following meanings:

- Galaxy Award (China), the highest award of Chinese science fiction.
- Galaxy Award (Japan), the highest award of Japanese TV program.
- Galaxy Award (Spain), a.k.a. Premios Galaxy, a Spanish pornographic film award.
