= Gu Shi (writer) =

Gu Shi (Chinese: 顾适; pinyin: Gù Shì, born 1985) is a Chinese science fiction writer and city planner.

== Life ==
Gu Shi graduated at Tongji University in Shanghai and obtained a Master at the China Academy of Urban Planning and Design. Since 2012 researches at its department for city planning.

== Bibliography ==
- The Last Save, first published in 2013, published in the anthology Sinopticon in November 2021.
- Reflection, first published in 2013, published in the anthology Broken Stars in April 2020.
- The Death of Nala, first published in 2014, published in English in 2024.
- Chimera, first published in 2015, published in English in the Clarkesworld Magazine in 2016.
- Möbius Continuum, first published in 2016, published in English in 2017, published in German in the anthology Quantenträume ["Quantum Dreams"] in September 2020, winner of the Galaxy Award in 2017.
- Introduction to 2181 Overture: Second Edition, first published in 2020, published in English in the Clarkesworld Magazine in January 2023.
- Poems and Distant Lands, published in English in 2019.
- No One at the Wild Dock, first published in 2020, published in English in the Clarkesworld Magazine in January 2022.
- The MagiMirror Algorithm, first published in 2022, published in English in the anthology The Book of Beijing in 2023.
- City of Choice, published in 2023.
- Mothership Comes to the Heart of the Ocean, published in 2023.
