= Life Does Not Allow Us to Meet =

Short story by He Xi

'Life Does Not Allow Us to Meet' is a science fiction short story by He Xi. It was first published in 2010; an English translation was published in the 2023 anthology Adventures in Space: New Short Stories by Chinese & English Science Fiction Writers.

== Synopsis ==
While on a mission to monitor cultural progress on the newly settled colony planet Caspian Sea, mission leader He Xi discovers that the colonists — who have been genetically modified so as to enable them to thrive on their new home — have undergone reproductive isolation such that their gametes are no longer compatible with the gametes of standard humans. Since this means they are no longer human, he commits genocide by releasing a genetically engineered virus which kills all the colonists except two, whom he secretly leaves alive under the supervision of his ex-girlfriend.

== Reception ==
The original version of Life Does Not Allow Us to Meet won a Galaxy Award and a Chinese Nebula Award. The English version (translated by Alex Woodend) was a finalist for the 2024 Hugo Award for Best Novella.

== Title ==
The story's title is an allusion to a poem by Du Fu.
