= Hospital (Han novel) =

2016 novel by Han Song

- Author: Han Song

Hospital (Chinese: 医院, Pinyin: yīyuàn) is a dystopian science-fiction novel by Chinese writer Han Song and the first part of the Hospital trilogy (Chinese: 医院三部曲, Pinyin: yīyuàn sān bù qǔ). The novel describes a world with an extreme misuse of the healthcare system. Patients are not properly informed about their diagnosis, told lies or are exploited. The Chinese version was published by Shanghai Literature and Art Publishing House (Chinese: 上海文艺术出, Pinyin: shànghǎi wén yìshù chū) on 1 June 2016. The English version was published by Amazon Crossing on 1 March 2023. The translation was done was Michael Berry.

== Plot ==
After a catastrophe on Earth, buddhism became the primary belief of humanity. The spaceship SS Mahamayuri (after Sanskrit महामायूरी Mahāmāyūrī for "Great Peacock") travels to Mars to search for another incarnation of Buddha, but instead discovers a hospital and peacock-like creatures attacking and then destroying the spaceship. Afterwards, many more hospitals are found everywhere in the Solar System. (The prologue is not referenced again and often interpreted purely as a metaphor.)

During a business trip to C City, Yang Wei, a songwriter from Corporation B, drinks a bottle of mineral water in his hotel, gets a strong stomach pain and falls asleep for three days. The hotel staff breaks into his room and transports him to the hospital, where the doctor treating him immediately knows about the mineral water. Yang Wei is told by a nurse, that the entire hotel is under surveillance and that the hospital has access to all tapes due to security concerns. For his examination, Yang Wei is brought into the dirty basement filled with moss and gets told, that the hospital demands a proof of his faith in form of money. Just recently, a patient mistrusted the hospital, handed over tea instead of urine and saw the positive result coming back as a proof of scam, severely angering the hospital. Yang Wei encounters multiple patients who themselves came back extremely angry, including one who paid a million dollars and one who had to pay for additional surgeries, that were neither necessary nor wished by him. Yang Wei realizes that people starting to pay for treatment can't leave before it is concluded as they would otherwise waste the money already paid. Therefore, the hospital can keep them as long as they wish by just postponing the end of the treatment and getting more money. Sister Jiang visits him to tell him about needing surgery after considering the results of his examination, but doesn't want to tell them to him, because it's only the business of the hospital. She invites Yang Wei to put his head on her lap to sleep and then treats him like a baby, continuing to call him "Little Yang". When being told, that pain in surgery is necessary to gain happiness in health, Yang Wei has a little panic attack. When returning, he sees his doctor running out of ink and instead using fresh blood to write. Sister Jiang tells him, that another person drank the mineral water at the hotel, but before she can leave, an angry former patient returns to detonate a bomb in the hospital, killing her. In her last moments, she hands Yang Wei over to ten-year-old Tao. Yang Wei starts to believe that everything weird he has seen yet is only the manifestation of some dark secret. Yang Wei's boss visits to tell him, that due to good relations of Corporation B with C City, it is good that he will stay in the hospital longer. Yang Wei begins a deep dive into the system behind the hospital, including an underground world of patients, a sentient being living in his stomach and the hospital spanning not only the Earth, but also the cosmos.

== Themes and genres ==
Ian Mond of Locus has argued that, "when viewed from a pre-COVID perspective, the novel’s central concerns seem to become about imperialism and authoritarianism."

Mingwei Song of Wellesley College has compared the novel to the works of Lu Xun, saying that "this crazed world, if it grows out of Lu Xun’s and other modern intellectuals’ dreams for enlightenment, has become the nightmare of reason and rationality," while praising Han for being "more subversive than any Chinese SF writer working today," saying that the "novel’s depiction of the hospital experience appears abnormal, absurd, and insane but integral to a nightmarish mirror image of China’s contemporary reality." Michael Berry, the novel's translator into English, has characterised the novel as a "mash-up between science fiction, horror, suspense, social realism, and avant-garde literature; think a hallucinogenic David Cronenberg film written by Franz Kafka and set during a Chinese politburo meeting," where "if readers peel away the façade of absurdity, they will quickly find uncanny reflections of and critical insights into the reality of China today."

Niall Harrison of the British Science Fiction Association has compared the novel to the 2009 novel The Method by Juli Zeh and the 2008 novel Harmony by Project Itoh, saying that they depict "worlds in which societies have been rearranged to prioritise an idealised notion of health." Harrison further compared the novel to Thomas Mann's 1924 The Magic Mountain, citing its "allegorical component" where "characters are primarily symbolic functions; that is, they exist to demonstrate and further argument, they are not intended to be resonant individuals who live beyond the page."

== Reception ==
Reviewing the novel for Locus, Ian Mond wrote that the novel tackled its themes in "inventive ways" and was "a remarkable display of the absurd and the cosmic, with what feels like a new, startling idea on every page," but that he "struggled to love" the novel, due to it "seem[ing] overly long," the "first third becom[ing] increasingly less engaging," and the "depiction of women" being "hard to digest." Subashini Navaratnam of Strange Horizons wrote that the novel "feels universal in its depiction of medical bureaucracy" and "reads like slapstick Dostoyevsky," praising Berry for the translation, while noting that the novel was "far from an easy read, despite its relatively short chapters and eminently pithy and quotable lines."
