= 2066: Red Star Over America =

2000 science fiction novel by Han Song

- Author: Han Song
- Genre: Science fiction
- Publisher: Heilongjiang People's Publishing House
- Publication date: February 1, 2000
- ISBN: 978-7-207-04637-6

2066: Red Star Over America is a 2000 science fiction novel by Chinese writer Han Song. In the story, the United States of America has experienced a series of economic disasters and political crises, while China has become an idyllic superpower. The protagonist is a Chinese Go prodigy who goes to a competition in the US and is caught in the midst of the Second American Civil War, and a terrorist attack at the World Trade Center (the buildings were destroyed the year after it was published). After a series of adventures, he returns to China.

In the novel, China has achieved its superpower by accepting the influence of Amando, "an intelligence that plans the citizens' lives and oversees their happiness". Amando fails when Martians come to Earth, turning China into the Land of Promise (fundi, also a way of referring to a cemetery). The story is told as a flashback from the year 2126, a time when earthling civilization no longer exists.

The book deals with themes of nationalism versus globalism. Academic David Der-wei Wang writes that the novel deals also with "the geopolitics of utopia in terms of socialist (China), capitalist (America), and extraterrestrial space."

Its title is in part a reference to Edgar Snow's classic reportage of China, Red Star Over China.

== See also ==
- Chinese science fiction
- Chinese literature
- List of science fiction novels
