= Zhao Haihong =

Chinese science fiction writer (born 1977)

- Native name: 赵海虹
- Born: 1977 (age 47–48) Hangzhou, China
- Occupation: Writer
- Language: Chinese
- Notable awards: Galaxy Award

Zhao Haihong (Chinese: 赵海虹; born 1977) is a Chinese science fiction writer.

== Life ==
Zhao Haihong was born in Hangzhou in 1977 and graduated from the foreign languages department of Zhejiang University. She currently teaches Anglo-American literature at Zhejiang Gongshang University.

== Work ==
Zhao already started in high school to write her first short stories. Apart from science fiction, she has also published a number of martial arts stories. For her science fiction stories, Zhao has received the Chinese Galaxy Award several times and her fans awarded her the unofficial title of "princess of Chinese science fiction." Zhao herself, however, stated that she found the labeling of "princess" problematic. Han Song proclaimed to be a fan of hers and praised her vivid literary style and her lifelike characters which he believes to be hardly matched in Chinese or international science fiction.
