= The Book of Beijing =

2023 anthology of stories about Beijing

The Book of Beijing is an anthology of ten stories from various Chinese writers, edited by Bingbing Shi and published on 7 September 2023. It is the twenty-fourth book of the Reading the City series, focused on stories from and about a certain city, in this case Beijing in China.

== Stories ==
- On the Subway by Fu Xuiying, translated by Chris MacDonald
- Secretly by Xu Zechen, translated by Eric Abrahamsen
- Dogshit Football by Xu Kun, translated by Katherine Tse
- Glass River by Qiu Huadong, translated by Paul Harris
- The MagiMirror Algorithm by Gu Shi, translated by Florence Taylor
- Date at the Art Gallery by Wen Zhen, translated by Jack Hargreaves
- Is Mr. Zhang Home? by Shi Yifeng, translated by Hongyu Jasmine Zhu
- Blue Peony by Ning Ken, translated by Alison Sharpless
- The Second Ring Road by Yu Wenling, translated by Helen Wang
- Reunion by Han Song, translated by Carson Ramsdell

== Background ==
The University of Manchester, whose Confucius Institute initiated the anthology, wrote that it "turns close friends into strangers, upends carefully thought-out life choices, and leaves next-door neighbours completely unaware of each other's true identity." The stories "show people in all contexts," who are "desperate to stake their name on the city".

Gu Shi and Wen Zhen read their stories at the Manchester Literature Festival von 15 October 2025.

== Reviews ==
Mary Kay Magistad wrote for China Books Review that the anthology "brings readers into this complex city through intimate, textured and at times jarring tales, of ordinary people navigating extraordinary times."

Sabina Knight wrote for Cha Journal that "few of the characters appear comfortable, and their struggles reveal an often-troubled embrace of the city." She continues that the "stories' disparate subjects and styles render a quirky composite portrait of Beijing," claiming that "readers seeking unflinching views of this complex megacity will be well rewarded."
