= Galaxy Award (China) =

Awards for literary science fiction (People's Republic of China)

The Galaxy Award (Chinese: 银河奖; pinyin: Yínhé Jiǎng) is China's most prestigious science fiction award, which was started in 1986 by the magazines Tree of Wisdom (Chinese: 《智慧树》; pinyin: Zhìhuì Shù) and Science Literature & Art (Chinese: 《科学文艺》; pinyin: Kēxué Wényì). After Tree of Wisdom ceased publication soon afterwards, the award was organized solely by Science Literature & Art, which was renamed to Science Fiction World (Chinese: 《科幻世界》) in 1991.

The structure of the prize has evolved, becoming an annual prize in 1991, and has recognized different categories.

In September 2016, the 27th Galaxy Award was held at the Beijing University of Aeronautics and Astronautics. In November 2017, the 28th award ceremony was held in Chengdu, China.

== Winners ==
A partial list of winners:

1st Galaxy Awards

  - Wu Xiankui, 勇士号冲向台风, yǒngshì hào chōng xiàng táifēng ["The Hero Tacks Into the Typhoon"] (1985);
  - Miao Shi, 不要问我从哪里来, bùyào wèn wǒ cóng nǎlǐ lái ["Don't Ask Me Where I'm From"] (1985);
  - Kong Liang, 盗窃青春的贼, dàoqiè qīngchūn de zéi ["The Thief Who Stole Youth"] (1985);
  - Yang Zhipeng, 青春的眷恋, qīngchūn de juànliàn ["Youthful Nostalgia"] (1985);
  - Wei Yahua, 远方来客, yuǎnfāng láikè ["Guest From Afar"] (1985).

2nd Galaxy Awards

  - Tan Xiaoke, 在时间的铅幕后面, zài shíjiān de qiān mùhòu miàn ["Behind the Lead Curtain of Time"] (1988).

3rd Galaxy Awards

  - Tan Li, 太空修道院, tàikōng xiūdàoyuàn ["Space Monastery"] (1990).

4th Galaxy Awards

  - No first prize.

5th Galaxy Awards

  - Wang Jinkang, 亚当回归, yàdāng huíguī ["Adam's Regression"] (1992).

6th Galaxy Awards

  - Wang Jinkang, 天火, tiānhuǒ ["Heaven's Fire"] (1993) (Special Prize);
  - He Xi (as He Hongwei), 平行, píngxíng ["Parallel"] (1993);
  - Xing He, 朝圣, cháoshèng ["Pilgrimage"] (1993).

7th Galaxy Awards

  - Wang Jinkang, 生命之歌, shēngmìng zhī gē ["The Song of Life"] (1994) (Special Prize);
  - Wu Yan, 沧桑, cāngsāng ["Dark Blue Mulberry"] (1994);
  - Han Jianguo, 泪洒鄱阳湖, lèi sǎ póyáng hú ["Tears in Poyang Lake"] (1994).

8th Galaxy Awards

  - Xing He, 决斗在网络, juédòu zài wǎngluò ["Duel on the Internet"] (1995) (Special Prize);
  - Wang Jinkang, 西奈噩梦, xīnài èmèng ["Occidental Nightmare"] (1995);
  - Su Xuejun, 火星尘暴, huǒxīng chénbào ["Martian Dust Storm"] (1995).

9th Galaxy Awards

  - Lu Yang, 黑洞之吻, hēidòng zhī wěn ["The Black Hole's Kiss"] (1996) (Special Prize);
  - Wang Jinkang, 七重外壳, qīchóng wàiké ["Seven Outer Casings"] (1996);
  - Zhao Haihong, 桦树的眼睛, huàshù de yǎnjīng ["Eyes of the Birches"] (1996).

10th Galaxy Awards

  - Wang Jinkang, 豹, bào ["Leopard"] (Special Prize) (1997);
  - Zhou Yukun, 会合第十行星, huìhé dì shí hángxīng ["Encounter with the Tenth Planet"] (1997);
  - Ling Chen, 猫, māo ["Cat"] (1997).

11th Galaxy Awards

  - Zhao Haihong, 伊俄卡斯达, yīékǎsīdá ["Jocasta"] (1998) (Special Prize);
  - Liu Cixin, 带上她的眼睛, dài shàng tā de yǎnjīng ["With Her Eyes"] (1998);
  - He Xi (as He Hongwei), 异域, yìyù ["Strange Land"] (1998).

12th Galaxy Awards

  - Liu Cixin, 流浪地球, liúlàng dìqiú ["The Wandering Earth"] (1999) (Special Prize);
  - Li Xingchun, 橱窗里的荷兰赌徒, chúchuāng lǐ de hélán dǔtú ["The Dutch Gambler in a Glass Case"] (1999);
  - He Xi, 爱别离, ài biélí ["Love is Over"] (1999).

13th Galaxy Awards

  - Liu Cixin, 全频带阻塞干扰, quán píndài zǔsè gānrǎo ["All-bandwidth Jamming Interference"] (2000);
  - Wang Jinkang, 替天行道, tì tiān xíngdào ["Doing The Lord's Work"] (2000);
  - Pan Haitian, 大角，快跑, dàjiǎo, kuài pǎo ["Run, Dajiao"] (2000);
  - Zhao Haihong, 蜕 tuì ["Exuviation"] (2000);
  - Wang Yanan, 盗墓, dàomù ["Grave Robber"] (2000).

14th Galaxy Awards

  - He Xi, 六道众生, liùdào zhòngshēng ["Six Ways to the Multitude"] (2001);
  - Liu Cixin, 中国太阳, zhōngguó tàiyáng ["Sun of China"] (2001);
  - Wang Jinkang, 水星播种, shuǐxīng bōzhòng ["Seeding Mercury"] (2001);
  - Shake Space, 马姨, mǎ yí ["Aunt Ma"] (2001);
  - Yang Mei, 日光镇, rìguāng zhèn ["Pressing Sunlight"] (2001).

15th Galaxy Awards

  - He Xi, 伤心者, shāngxīn zhě ["The Broken-Hearted"] (2002);
  - Liu Cixin, 地球大炮, dìqiú dàpào ["Cannonball"] (2002);
  - Luo Longxiang, 寄生之魔, jìshēng zhī mó ["The Devil of Biology"] (2002) (Newcomer's Award);
  - La La, 春日泽·云梦山·仲昆, chūnrì zé·yúnmèng shān·zhòngkūn ["Spring Sun Spring: Yun Meng Mountain: Elder Brothers"] (2002) (Newcomer's Award).

16th Galaxy Awards

  - Liu Cixin, 镜子, jìngzi ["Mirror"] (2003);
  - Xia Jia, 关妖精的瓶子, guān yāojing de píngzi (April 2004 Kehuan Shijie trans. Linda Rui Feng as "The Demon-Enslaving Flask" November 2012 Renditions);
  - Qian Lifang, 天意, tiānyì ["Divine Intention"] (2003).
  - (Most Popular Foreign Writer) Lois McMaster Bujold.

17th Galaxy Awards

  - Liu Cixin, 赡养人类, shànyǎng rénlèi ["For the Benefit of Mankind"] (2004);
  - He Xi, 天生我材, tiānshēng wǒ cái ["Innate Talent"] (2004);
  - Xie Yunning, 深度撞击, shēndù zhuàngjí ["Deep Impact"] (2004) (Newcomer's Award);
  - (Most Popular Foreign Writer) Douglas Adams.

18th Galaxy Awards

  - Liu Cixin, 三体, sān tǐ ["The Three Body Problem"] (2005);
  - Wang Jinkang, 终极爆炸, zhōngjí bàozhà ["Ultimate Explosion"] (2005);
  - Chang Jia, 昆仑, kūnlún ["Kunlun Mountains"] (2005);
  - (Most Popular Foreign Writer) Robert J. Sawyer.

19th Galaxy Awards

  - La La, 永不消失的电波, yǒng bù xiāoshī de diànbō ["The Perpetual Electric Wave"] (2006);
  - Chang Jia, 674号公路, 674 hào gōnglù ["Highway 674"] (2006);
  - Luo Longxiang, 在他乡, zài tāxiāng ["In a Strange Land"] (2006);
  - (Most Popular Foreign Writer) Neil Gaiman.

20th Galaxy Awards

  - Chang Jia, 扶桑之伤, fúsāng zhī shāng ["Fusang's Wound"] (2007);
  - Xia Jia, 永夏之梦, yǒng xià zhī mèng ["Perpetual Summer's Dream"] (venue unknown 2007);
  - Wang Jinkang, 活着, huózhe ["Live Contact"] (2007);
  - (Most Popular Foreign Writer) Neil Gaiman.

21st Galaxy Awards

  - Jiang Bo, 时空追缉, shíkōng zhuī jī ["Spacetime Pursuit"] (2008);
  - Wang Jinkang, 有关时空旅行的马龙定律, yǒuguān shíkōng lǚxíng de mǎlóng dìnglǜ ["Ma Long's Law of Space-Time Travelling"] (2008);
  - He Xi, 十亿年后的来客, shí yì nián hòu de láikè ["The Traveller from 1,000,000,000 Years Hence"] (2008);
  - (Most Popular Foreign Writer) George R R Martin.

22nd Galaxy Awards

  - Liu Cixin, 死神永生, sǐshén yǒngshēng ["Death's End"] (2009);
  - He Xi, 人生不相见, rénshēng bù xiāngjiàn ["No Sign of Life"] (2009);
  - (Most Popular Foreign Writer) George R R Martin.

23rd Galaxy Awards

  - Wang Jinkang, 与吾同在, yǔ wú tóng zài ["We, Together"] (2011) (Grand Prize);
  - Chen Qiufan, 无尽的告别, wújìn de gàobié ["Infinite Goodbyes"] (November 2011 Kehuan Shijie);
  - Yin Kemi, 雷峰塔, léi fēng tǎ ["Thunder Peak Pagoda"] (December 2011 Kehuan Shijie);
  - Liu Shuiqing, 第九站的诗人, dì jiǔ zhàn de shīrén ["Poet of the Ninth Station"] (September 2011 Kehuan Shijie);
  - (Most Popular Foreign Writer) Paolo Bacigalupi.

24th Galaxy Awards

  - Zhang Ran, 以太, yǐtài ["Ether"](2012);
  - He Xi, 汪洋战争, wāngyáng zhànzhēng ["War on the Seeping Sea"] (February 2012 Kehuan Shijie);
  - Bao Shu, 在冥王星上我们坐下来观看, zài míngwángxīng shàng wǒmen zuò xiàlái guānkàn ["On Pluto We Sit Down and Watch"] (venue unknown) (2012);
  - (Most Popular Foreign Writer) David Brin.

25th Galaxy Awards

  - Wang Jinkang, 逃出母宇宙, tāochū mǔ yǔzhòu ["Escape from the Mother Universe"](2013);
  - Zhao Ran, 起风之城, qǐ fēng zhī chéng ["The Windy City"] (2013 chap?);
  - Jiang Bo, 梦醒黄昏, mèng xǐng huánghūn ["Awaking at Dusk"] (September 2013 Kehuan Shijie);
  - (Most Popular Foreign Writer) Ken Liu.

26th Galaxy Awards

  - No Long-Form Award;
  - Zhao Ran, 大饥之年, dà jī zhī nián ["The Years of Famine"] (venue unknown)(2014);
  - Bao Shu, 人人都爱查尔斯, rénrén dōu ài chá'ěrsī ["Everybody Loves Charles"] (September 2014 Kehuan Shijie);
  - (Most Popular Foreign Writer) Ken Liu.

27th Galaxy Awards
Category	Winner(s)	Notes
Best Novel	Tiannian, He Xi	Sichuan Literature and Art Publishing House
Best Novella	When the Sun Falls, Zhang Ran; The Way of the Machine, Jiang Bo	
Best Short Story	"Good Night Melancholy", Xia Jia "Ba Lin", Chen Yufan "Promised Son", Cyniss	
Best Newcomer	Miss Cynic	
Best Art	Shark Dan	
Best Translation	Sun Jia	
Best Editor	Li Keqin (Science Fiction World magazine); Song Qi (Sichuan Science and Technology Press)	
Best Original Book	Liu Cixin's Science Fiction Short Stories Collection	Sichuan Science and Technology Publishing House
Best Introduction Book	Kyreniaga, Mike Resnick (US), trans. Wang Meizi	Sichuan Science and Technology Publishing House
Best Introduction Book	The Martian (Weir novel), Andy Weir (US), trans. Chen Zhuo	Lin Publishing House
Best Related Book	Physics in <Three Bodies>, Li Miao	Sichuan Science and Technology Press
Most Popular Foreign Writer	Greg Bell	United States
Best Science Fiction Game	Thunder Fighter	Tencent Games
Special Merit Award	Yang Xiao; Tan Kai	

28th Galaxy Awards
Category	Winner(s)	Notes
Best Novel	The Heart of Galaxy III: Chasing Shadow and Light, Jiang Bo	
Best Novella	Shining, Chen Zijun; Electricity Soul, Quanru Xiaojie	Tie
Best Short Story	"Life", He Xi "Iron Moon", Xia Jia "Möbius Continuum", Gu Shi	Tie
Best New Writer	Taiyi	
Best Art	Cover of Science Fiction Translation #5, Lan Shitao	
Most Popular Foreign Writer	Mike Resnick	
Best Chinese Book	Mother Heaven and Father Earth, Wang Jinkang (Sichuan Science & Technology)	
Best Foreign Book	Quantum Thief, Hannu Rajaniemi (Sichuan Science & Technology); Collection of Ray Bradbury, Ray Bradbury (New Star Publishing)	Tie
Best Related Book	How Long Is the Alien’s Fingers?, Xi Xia (Sichuan Science & Technology)	
Best Editor	Li Keqin; Zou He	
Best Internet Novel	Reborn: Super Warship, Xu Junbo	
Best Adaptation	The Three Body Problem stage play, based on the novel by Cixin Liu	
Best Fan Society	Sichuan University SF Society	

29th Galaxy Awards
Category	Winner(s)	Notes
Best Novel	Vacancy	
Best Novella	Painting Bones, Gu Di; Death Forest, Peng Chao	Tie
Best Short Story	"Tiantu", Wang Jinkang "Fire", Bai Lehan "The Record of Cloud Whales", A Lack	
Best Newcomer	Wang Nuonuo	
Best Online Literature	Under the Deep Space, Yu Haoyi	
Best Original Book	Exorcism, Han Song	Shanghai Literature and Art Publishing House
Best Introduction Book	Memory Crack: The Complete Works of Philip Dick's Short Stories 1, Philip K. Dick (US), trans. Yu Juanjuan	Sichuan Science and Technology Publishing House
Best Introduction Book	Cryptonomicon, Neal Stephenson (US), trans. Liu Sihan / Han Yang	Xinxing Publishing House

30th Galaxy Awards
Category	Winner(s)	Notes
Best Novel	The Door of the Machine, Jiang Bo	
Best Novella	Brain Gamble, Gu Shi	
Best Short Story	"The Year Wheel of the Earth", Kong Xinwei "The Past in Chengdu", Baoshu "Song Xiuyun", A Que	Tie
Best New Writer	Yang Wanqing	
Best Translation	Dragon's Egg, Robert L. Forward, trans. Hu Yu	
Best Art	Cover of Moon Sea Shipwreck, Guo Jian	
Most Popular Foreign Writer	Ian Tregillis	United States
Best Editor	Wei Yingxue	
Best Chinese Book	A Foreigner	Sichuan Science and Technology Publishing House
Best Chinese Book	Resinfic Products	Jiangsu Phoenix Literature Publishing House
Best Foreign Book	The Minority Report, Philip K. Dick	Sichuan Science and Technology Publishing House
Best Foreign Book	Seveneves, Neal Stephenson	CITIC Publishing House
Best Related Book	In Other Worlds: Science Fiction and Human Imagination	Henan University Press
Best Internet Novel	Death on Mars, Tianrui	
Best Adaptation	The Wandering Earth	
Best Science Fiction Game	Doomsday Expedition	Chengdu Adikexin Technology Co., Ltd.
Best Fan Society	Science Fiction Association of Wuhan University; Science Fiction Association of Tsinghua University; Science Fiction Association of Sichuan University; Science Fiction Association of Chengdu University of Technology	
Best Science Fiction Channel	Jingdong Books; Sichuan Wenxuan Online E-commerce Co., Ltd. Dangdang.com; Boku Digital Publishing Media Group Co., Ltd.	

31st Galaxy Awards
Category	Winner(s)	Notes
Best Novel	Vacancy	Judges were unable to reach a consensus
Best Novella	Baoshu: Our Science Fiction World; Chen Hongyu: The Realm of Eternal Disaster; July: Double Spin	
Best Short Story	Mu Ming: "Coloring World"; Titanium Art: "Spark Hibana"; Fractal Orange: The Mystery of Titonus; Grey Fox: "Trinity"; Liu Yanzeng: "Elegant Overlay"	
Best New Writer	Fractal Orange: The Mystery of Titonus; Endless: "Unmanned Driving Control"	
Best Translation	Sun Jia (Holy Secret, original work: Philip K. Dick)	
Best Art	Nine Generations of Naruto: Science Fiction World – Translated Edition, 2019-01 Issue Cover	
Most Popular Foreign Writer	Ueda Asunaro: Dream Search Reed Flute	Japan
Best Editor	Li Xin; Chen Yao	
Best Internet Novel	Things in the Fire: Millennium Backtrack	
Best Chinese Book	Sichuan Science and Technology Publishing House: Cosmic Crystal Egg (Wang Jinkang); CITIC Publishing Group: Life Algorithm (Chen Yufan)	
Best Foreign Book	Sichuan Science and Technology Publishing House: Dragon's Egg (Robert L. Forward)	
Best Related Book	Sichuan Science and Technology Publishing House: The Secret of Three Bodies (Tian Jiagang); China Pictorial Publishing House: Science Fiction Chronicles (Guy Haley)	
Best Fan Society	Science Fantasy Association of Renmin University of China; Beijing Post Micro Science Fiction Association; Southwest Jiaotong University Science Fiction Association	

32nd Galaxy Awards
Category	Winner(s)	Notes
Best Novel	Crossing the Saturn Ring, Xie Yunning; Go to the End of His Time, Cheng Jingbo	
Best Novella	Invisible Age, Teng Ye	See “Science Fiction World” Issues 07–08 and 11–12 (2020)
Best Short Story	"The Box of Leibniz", Li Weibei "Born to Be a Human Being", Peng Chao "Translation", Zhang Shu "Returning the Soul", Ren Qing "The Returning Man", Yang Wanqing	
Best Original Book	Imagination Is the Eye of the Soul, Liu Cixin et al., ed. Laz; Nebula X: Themis, Jiang Bo / A Kui / Xu Gang / Lu Pan, ed. Yao Haihai	Sichuan Science and Technology Publishing House
Best Introduction Book	Purple and Black: K.J. Parker’s Short Stories, K.J. Parker, trans. Shen Kaiyu et al. Astounding: John W. Campbell, Isaac Asimov, Robert A. Heinlein, L. Ron Hubbard, and the Golden Age of Science Fiction, Alec Nevala-Lee, trans. Sun Yanan	Sichuan Science & Technology & Beijing University of Technology Press
Best Related Book	On the Other Side of the Star, Zhao Enzhe; Sacred Invasion: The Life of Philip K. Dick, Lawrence Sutin, trans. Chen Zhuo	
Best Translation	Marrow (novel), Robert Reed (author), trans. Gaye; Sacred Invasion: The Life of Philip K. Dick, Lawrence Sutin, trans. Chen Zhuo	Sichuan Science & Technology Publishing House
Best Internet Novel	We Live in Nanjing, Tianrui	
Best Children's Science Fiction Short Story	"Ape Desire", Chen Jing "Crazy School Bus", Xu Dongze "Eternal Summer", Peng Liurong	New category in 2020
Best Children's Sci-Fi Art	Cover of Science Fiction World – Junior Edition, Issue 3 (2020), Sun Haixin (Haige Illustration)	
Best New Writer	White; Lu Pan	
Most Popular Foreign Writer	Robert Reed (author)	United States
Best Editor	Wang Xu	
Best Art	Cover of Science Fiction World – Translated Edition, Issue 08 (2020), Xie Chunzhi	
Best Science Fiction Society	Science Fiction Association of Sichuan University; Science Fiction Association of Southwest University of Finance and Economics	
Best SF Adaptation	The Third Type of Death (audio drama), produced by All Things Acoustics, original work by Song Xinying	

33rd Galaxy Awards
Category	Winner(s)	Notes
Best Novel	Vacancy	Judges were unable to reach a consensus
Best Novella	New Noble, Lu Pan – in Nebula XI: See Words Like Faces; Doomsday Monologue, Dongfang Xiaocan – Science Fiction World, Issue 6 (2021)	
Best Short Story	"Turing Stall", Wang Nuonuo "Lingyin Temple Monk", Xiaqi "Longmen Array", Jia Yu "2039: Brain Age", A Ki "The Man Who Blows Bubbles All His Life", Xie Yunning	
Best Chinese Book	Returnee: Yang Wanqing's Short Science Fiction Collection, Yang Wanqing; She: Classic Works of Chinese Female Science Fiction Writers, ed. Cheng Jingbo; Titan No Voice, Tianrui	
Best Foreign Book	Star Maker, Olaf Stapledon, trans. Baoshu; Project Hail Mary, Andy Weir, trans. Geng Hui	
Best Related Book	Cyberpunk 2077: Trauma Team, Karen Bonny / Miguel Baldrama, trans. Zhao Weixuan "Modern" and "Unknown": Research on Science Fiction in the Late Qing Dynasty, Jia Liyuan	
Best Children's Science Fiction Short Story	"The Last Companion", Ji Daru "Alter-Frequency World", He Xin "Superhero", Cao Xiaodan	
Best Children's Science Fiction Art	Cover of Science Fiction World – Junior Edition, Issue 2021-04, Sun Haixin	
Best New Writer	Ren Qing	
Most Popular Foreign Writer	Shinji Kajio	Japan
Best Translation	Star Maker, Olaf Stapledon, trans. Baoshu	Sichuan Science and Technology Publishing House
Best Internet Novel	Deep Sea Ember, Yuantong	
Best Art	Cover of Science Fiction World – Translated Edition, Issue 2021-05, Lan Shitao	
Best Fan Society	Science Fiction Association of Huazhong Normal University; Sifei Science Fiction Society of Harbin University of Technology	
Most Adaptation Potential	Spiritual Walker, Selling Newspaper Xiaolangjun; The Nomenclature of the Night, Talking Elbow "Turing Stall", Wang Nuonuo; New Noble, Lu Pan	
Best Science Fiction Channel	Jingdong Books; Dangdang.com; Sichuan Wenxuan Online E-commerce Co., Ltd. Boku Digital Publishing Media Group Co., Ltd. Science Fiction Bookstore Where the Stars Are	

34th Galaxy Awards
Category	Winner(s)	Notes
Best Novel	Vacancy	Judges were unable to reach a consensus
Best Novella	Stories Related to Stories, Zhang Xiao – Science Fiction World, Issue 5 (2022); Descartes' Demon, Fractal Orange – Nebula XII: Descartes' Demon; Tower, Yang Wanqing – Nebula XII: Descartes' Demon	
Best Short Story	"Yan Hong", Yang Jian – Science Fiction World, Issue 4 (2022) "Bald-headed Sparrow", Yang Jian – Science Fiction World, Issue 6 (2022) "Invisible Clouds", Kong Xinwei – November 2022 "Abandoned Sun Without Trace", Ren Qing – Science Fiction World, Issue 2 (2022) "Life Hangs on the Line", Jiang Bo – Science Fiction World, Issue 1 (2022)	
Best New Writer	Jia Yu	
Best Translation	If We Can't Move Forward at the Speed of Light, Kim Cho-yeop, trans. Chunxi	Sichuan Science and Technology Publishing House
Best Art	Cover of Science Fiction World, Issue 7 (2022), Huang Qin	
Most Popular Foreign Writer	Kim Cho-yeop – If We Can't Move Forward at the Speed of Light, trans. Chunxi	Sichuan Science and Technology Publishing House
Best Internet Novel	Secret Dead Corner, Get Out of Here	
Best Chinese Book	Our Science Fiction World: A Collection of Short Science Fiction Novels in Baoshu, Baoshu	Sichuan Science and Technology Publishing House
Best Chinese Book	My Healing Game, I Can Repair Air Conditioners	Huazhong University of Science and Technology Press
Best Foreign Book	Love, Death & Robots, Liu Yukun et al., trans. Lin Publishing House; Hifute Grass, Miyuki Miyabe	Sichuan Science and Technology Publishing House
Best International Communication	Francisco Walso	Italy
Best Related Book	Tsukima Island Soul Art Setting Collection, Raid Game Studio	Hainan Publishing House
Best Related Book	The History of Chinese Science Fiction in the 20th Century, Wu Yan	Peking University Press
Best Fan Society	Science Fiction Association of Huazhong Agricultural University; Science Fiction Association of Southwest Jiaotong University	
Best Science Fiction Channel	Jingdong Books; Dangdang.com; Sichuan Wenxuan Online E-commerce Co., Ltd. Boku Digital Publishing Media Group Co., Ltd.	
Best Children's Science Fiction Short Story	"A Butterfly's Autobiss", Jia Yu – Science Fiction World – Junior Edition, Issues 4–5 (2022) "Blocked Exam Day", Slowly Knight – Science Fiction World – Junior Edition, Issue 6 (2022) "Homeland", Yu Jinming – Science Fiction World – Junior Edition, Issue 9 (2022)	
Best Children's Science Fiction Art	Cover of Science Fiction World – Junior Edition, Issue 10 (2022), Sun Haixin	
