= David Seidner =

American photographer (1957–1999)

David Seidner (18 February 1957 – 6 June 1999) was an American photographer known for his portraits and fashion photography.

== Biography ==
=== Career and style ===
David Seidner was nineteen when his first cover picture was published and twenty-one when the first of many solo exhibitions of his photographs was shown in Paris. Over the following 20 years he created both "commercial" and "artistic" work. In the 1980s he was under a contract with Yves Saint Laurent. His commercial work included fashion shoots for the French and Italian editions of Vogue, Harper's Bazaar, Vanity Fair and The New York Times Magazine, and advertising campaigns for Emmanuel Ungaro, Lanvin, Christian Dior, John Galliano and Bill Blass. The artistic side encompassed shows at the Pompidou Centre and La Maison Europeenne de la Photographie in Paris, the Whitney Museum in New York, and the publication of several books. In 1986 he was commissioned by the Musée des Arts de la Mode in Paris to photograph costumes from its collection. His signature imagery from that period included photographic fragments, paint, shards of glass and reflections. His influence then was the music of John Cage.

His immense cultural knowledge enabled him to draw on the past to create modern yet timeless images. His nudes evoke Greek classical sculpture; his portraits from the mid-Nineties were inspired by John Singer Sargent and evoke the paintings of Boldini, Ingres and Velázquez; his black and white portraits of artists recall busts of Roman emperors.

Seidner's work had several defining periods. In its evolution, his images became more and more pure, ending with the simplicity of the orchid series, which was taken in his Miami apartment using an auto- focus camera and colour negative film.

A very important phase of David Seidner's work was his series of nudes, which were also collected in book form as Nudes, to accompany an exhibition at New York's Robert Miller Gallery in 1995. Accomplished in a relatively short period of two years, the photographs were inspired by his love of Greek antiquity and a search for beauty. Friends, acquaintances and friends of friends posed in classical, sculptural stances.

In 1998 David Seidner made a series of pictures to honor the John Singer Sargent retrospective at the National Gallery in Washington, D.C. He photographed 18 descendants of the British and American aristocrats whose elegant portraits Sargent painted around the turn of the century. The result: sumptuous portraits that pay homage to Sargent without imitating his paintings. "What I'm most interested in is evoking the spirit of a painting through the fold of fabric, the position of a hand, the quality of light on skin", said the photographer. The portrait of Helena Bonham Carter was selected for the millennial exhibition at the National Portrait Gallery, London, as one of the 100 great photographs of the century and also received a LIFE Magazine Alfred Eisenstaedt Photograph of the Year Award (1999).

Seidner's Faces of Contemporary Art series totals 57 portraits taken over a period of six years. Each portrait was taken in exactly the same context. From portrait to portrait, it is only the faces that change. Everything was precisely measured and calculated for a perfect alignment of size and background. He used a very complicated printing process called platinotype, which is a monochrome photographic printing process based on the light-sensitivity of ferric oxalate on Arches paper. All of the portraits were done between 1990 and 1996. He describes having taken a portrait of John Cage in 1977, and making a more complete body of work of a similar type, including portraits of Julian Schnabel and Alex Katz (1996). The portraits were shown as a group in 1996 in Paris at La Maison Europeenne de la Photographie. A book was produced of this work, published by Gina Kehayoff Verlag and Maison Européenne de la Photographie in 1996, with an essay by Seidner.

Mr. Seidner also had over a dozen solo exhibitions and participated in group exhibitions at the Whitney Museum and the Pompidou Center in Paris. In the last months of his life, he completed a series of photographs of orchids that were featured in The New York Times Magazine on April 25, 1999. He died of complications from AIDS on June 6, 1999.

== Books by Seidner ==
- (2002) Theatre de la Mode: Fashion Dolls: The Survival of Haute Couture Photographs by David Seidner (ISBN 0-935278-56-7)
- (1999) Artists at Work: Inside the Studios of Today's Most Celebrated Artists by David Seidner and Diana Edkins (978-0847822379)
- (1999) Portraits by David Seidner (2-84323-152-3)
- (1998) The Face of Contemporary Art by David Seidner (3-929078-46-5)
- (1996) Lisa Fonssagrives: Three Decades of Classic Fashion Photography by David Seidner and Martin Harrison (0-500-01750-6)
- (1995) Nudes by David Seidner (3-929078-20-1)
- (1990) Le Théâtre de la Mode Photography by David Seidner (2-906450-41-3)
- (1989) David Seidner text by Patrick Mauries (0-8478-1114-X)
- (1986) Moments de Mode by David Seidner(2-7335-0107-0)
