= Erik Madigan Heck =

American artist and photographer (born 1983)

- Born: September 9, 1983 (age 42); Excelsior, Minnesota, US
- Known for: Photography
- Website: http://maisondesprit.com/

Erik Madigan Heck (born September 9, 1983) is an American artist and photographer. Heck is the founding editor of art and fashion publication Nomenus Quarterly. In 2013, Heck was awarded the Infinity Award for Applied/Fashion/Advertising by the International Center of Photography. In 2012, he photographed Neiman Marcus' "Art of Fashion" campaign. In April 2011, Photo District News magazine named Heck one of the 30 "new and emerging photographers to watch." Heck was also awarded the "30 Under 30" award by Forbes Magazine.

== Early life and education ==
Heck was born in Excelsior, Minnesota. Heck was exposed to art and museums in Minneapolis from an early age by his parents. He began photographing at the age of 14, after receiving his first camera as a gift from his mother. In 2002, as a senior in high school, Heck received the Alliance for Young Artists & Writers Scholastic Art Awards Gold Medal for his work in photography. Heck graduated from Salve Regina University with a degree in political science and earned his MFA in photography from Parsons the New School for Design.

== Work ==
Erik Madigan Heck moved to New York City where he founded the semi-yearly publication Nomenus Quarterly in 2007. The project was conceived as a collaborative platform working with artists of all mediums within the worlds of fine art and fashion. Nomenus Quarterly was published both online and in print, featuring the work of artists such as Anselm Kiefer, Gerhard Richter, Rodarte, Ann Demeulemeester, and Heck himself.

Journalist Dan Thawley describes Heck's work as "[having] a dreamlike quality marked by surrealist undertones, an appreciation for fine art conventions, and an exploration of various photographic mediums (both modern and obsolete)". Heck works with both analog and digital photography as well as with Super 8 for film shorts.

Heck identifies himself as a “painter who uses photography,” and cites the 19th century painter Édouard Vuillard as one of his major influences as well as the work of modern photographer Harry Callahan.

Due to Heck's interest in mediums and technologies of the past, his reoccurring use of nature as a theme, as well as his focus on beauty as the ultimate ideal, Heck's work has often been described as a contemporary extension of Romanticism. Referencing his own work, Heck explains that “...to access beauty is what we ultimately desire, and the tangibility of this access is what in my opinion ultimately differentiates fashion from art as end points on a continuum, and simultaneously elevates fashion photography to such an important place in contemporary society.”

Heck has created advertorial portfolios for brands such as Mary Katrantzou, Kenzo, and Etro.

== Exhibitions ==
Heck has shown work internationally. In June 2014, Heck's solo show, "The Absorbed Tradition," was shown at Bosi Contemporary in New York and presented alongside a special new Heck-curated issue of Creem Magazine. His photographs have also been included in exhibitions such as “Outer Dark: Continuing After Fashion” at the Museum für angewandte Kunst Frankfurt and “Don’t Stop Now: Fashion Photography Next” at FOAM Museum Amsterdam.

- 2020: The Garden, Christophe Guye Galerie, Zurich, Switzerland
- 2018: Old Future, Christophe Guye Galerie, Zurich, Switzerland
- 2018: Old Future, Nicholas Metivier, Toronto, Canada
- 2018: Erik Madigan Heck, Jackson Fine Art, Atlanta, US
- 2017: Old Future, The Weinstein Hammons Gallery, Minneapolis, US
