= Ling Chen =

Ling Chen (Chinese: 凌晨; pinyin: Líng Chén, born 1972) is a Chinese science fiction writer. She is a member of the China Science Writers’ Association, the Beijing Writers’ Association, and the Beijing Society for Creative Science Writing. Three of her works have won the Galaxy Award. One of her short stories is included in the german anthology Quantenträume ["Quantum Dreams"]. During a celebration of her career, fellow Chinese science fiction writer Liu Cixin (most well-known outside China for the Hugo Award winning The Three-Body Problem) praised her approach as "a profound sense of ethereal grandeur".

== Bibliography ==
- 信使, xìnshǐ ["Messenger"], second place at the Galaxy Award in 1996.
- 猫, māo ["Cat"], first published in 1997, winner of the Galaxy Award in 1998.
- 潜入贵阳, qiánrù guìyáng ["Sneaking into Guiyang"], Reader's Award at the Galaxy Award in 2004.
- 应龙, yīng lóng ["Answer of the Dragon"], first published in 2007.
- 铂戒, bó jiè ["Ring of Platinum"], first published in 2007.
- 2012: The New Day, first published in January 2011, published in German in the anthology Quantenträume ["Quantum Dreams"] in September 2020.
- A Story of Titan (泰坦的故事, tàitǎn de gùshì), first published in Pathlight (路灯) Issue 5, April 2013, translated in English by Joel Martinsen
- 404之见龙在天 ["404: Seeing the Dragon in the Sky"], published in June 2016
- 乔飞, Qiáo fēi, first published in Pathlight (路灯), 2018, translated in English by Joel Martinsen
- 437火锅诞生记 ["437: The Birth of Hotpot"], published in September 2022
