= François Halard =

French photographer (born 1961)

François Halard (born 1961) is a French photographer known for his interior and architectural photographs.

== Biography ==
François Halard was born in 1961 in France but now spends time between homes in New York City and France. He studied at the École Nationale Supérieure des Beaux-Arts in Paris. Soon after, he began working for Decoration International, and then with Conde Nast art director Alex Liberman. In 1984, François moved to New York City where he began regular commissions for several Conde Nast publications, including American Vogue, Vanity Fair, GQ, and House & Garden.

== Commercial Work ==
François Halard is well known for his interior and architectural photographs. He is also known for his longtime collaborations with Fabien Baron and Alex Liberman.

His work has been featured in advertising such as Armani, Burberry, Ralph Lauren, Yves Saint Laurent, Hugo Boss, and Ann Taylor.

== Books ==
Marie-Antoinette and the Last Garden at Versailles - by Christian Duvernois and François Halard
The Private Realm of Marie Antoinette - by Marie-France Boyer and François Halard
La Maison de Verre - by Dominique Vellay and François Halard
Les Lieux de la reine - by Marie-France Boyer and François Halard
