= Wang Jinkang =

Chinese science fiction writer

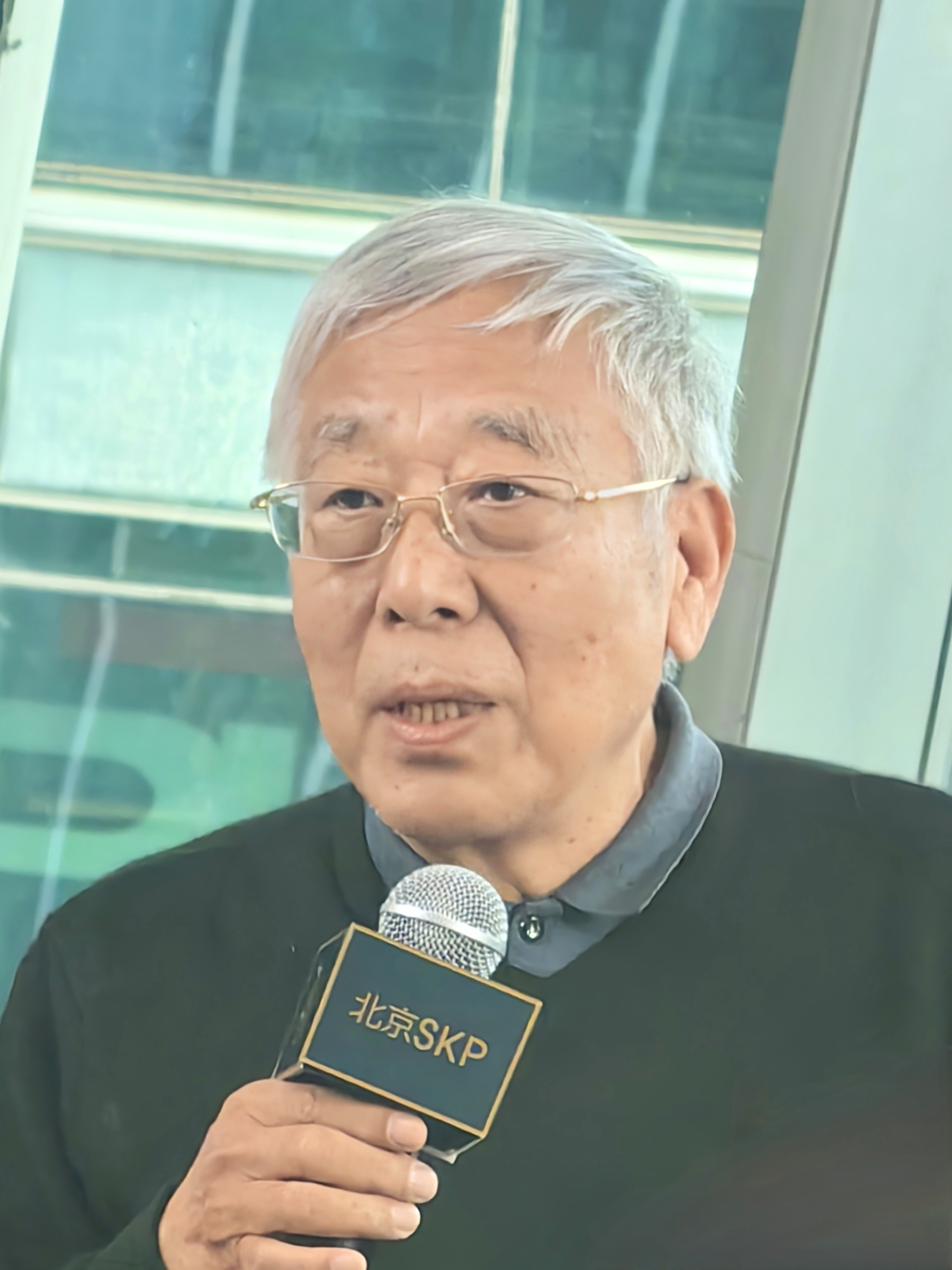
Wang Jinkang (2025)

Wang Jinkang is a Chinese science-fiction author.

== Biography ==
Wang was born in 1948. After working in an iron foundry, he earned a degree in engineering at Xi'an Jiaotong University.

He published his first work of science-fiction, Adam's Regression, in 1993. He has since published 10 novels and a range of short stories. He has served as vice-president of the China Science Writers Association. Regina Kanyu Wang has described him as one of the "big four" of Chinese science-fiction.

Seeds of Mercury was nominated for the 2024 Hugo Award for Best Novella.

== Bibliography ==
- 亚当回归, Pinyin yàdāng huíguī [„Adam’s Regression“], won the Galaxy Award 1993; later published in the anthology Sinopticon.
- 天火, Pinyin tiānhuǒ [„Sky Fire“], won the Galaxy Award 1994.
- 生命之歌, Pinyin shēngmìng zhī gē [„Song of Life“], won the Galaxy Award 1995.
- 西奈噩梦, Pinyin xīnài èmèng [„Sinai nightmare“], won the Galaxy Award 1996.
- 七重外壳, Pinyin qīchóng wàiké [„Seven shells“], won the Galaxy Award 1997.
- 豹, Pinyin bào [„Leopard“], won the Galaxy Award 1997.
- 替天行道, Pinyin tì tiān xíngdào [„Acting on Heaven's Behalf“], won the Galaxy Award 2001.
- 水星播种, Pinyin shuǐxīng bōzhòng [„Seeds of Mercury“], won the Galaxy Award 2002.
- 终极爆炸, Pinyin zhōngjí bàozhà [„Ultimate Explosion“], won the Galaxy Award 2006.
- 活着, Pinyin huózhe [„Living“], won the Galaxy Award 2008.
- 有关时空旅行的马龙定律, Pinyin yǒuguān shíkōng lǚxíng de mǎlóng dìnglǜ [„Marlon's law of spacetime travel“], won the Galaxy Award 2009.
- 与吾同在, Pinyin yǔ wú tóng zài [„We together“], won the Galaxy Award 2011.
- 掏出母宇宙, Pinyin tāochū mǔ yǔzhòu [„Escape from the mother universe“], won the Galaxy Award 2013.
- 天图, Pinyin tiāntú [„Sky map“], won the Galaxy Award 2016.

== Themes ==
In a 2024 interview with Locus Magazine, Wang stated that his works are often described as "philosophical science fiction," saying that they focus on the "inherent shock value of science, as well as "the humanistic reflections brought by technology." He has previously stated that, in his works, "bioethics and cosmic issues are naturally inseparable."
