= Pan Hai-tian =

Chinese science fiction author (born 1975)

Pan Haitian is a Chinese science fiction author. He was born in 1975 and is part of the "third generation" of Chinese sci-fi writers. His books include Run, Dajiao, Run about a boy in search of medicine and City of Clones which deals with human nature. Lauren Hilgers of Wired called him "one of China's most thoughtful- and cynically funny- sci-fi writers."
