= Baoshu =

Chinese science fiction and fantasy

Baoshu 宝树
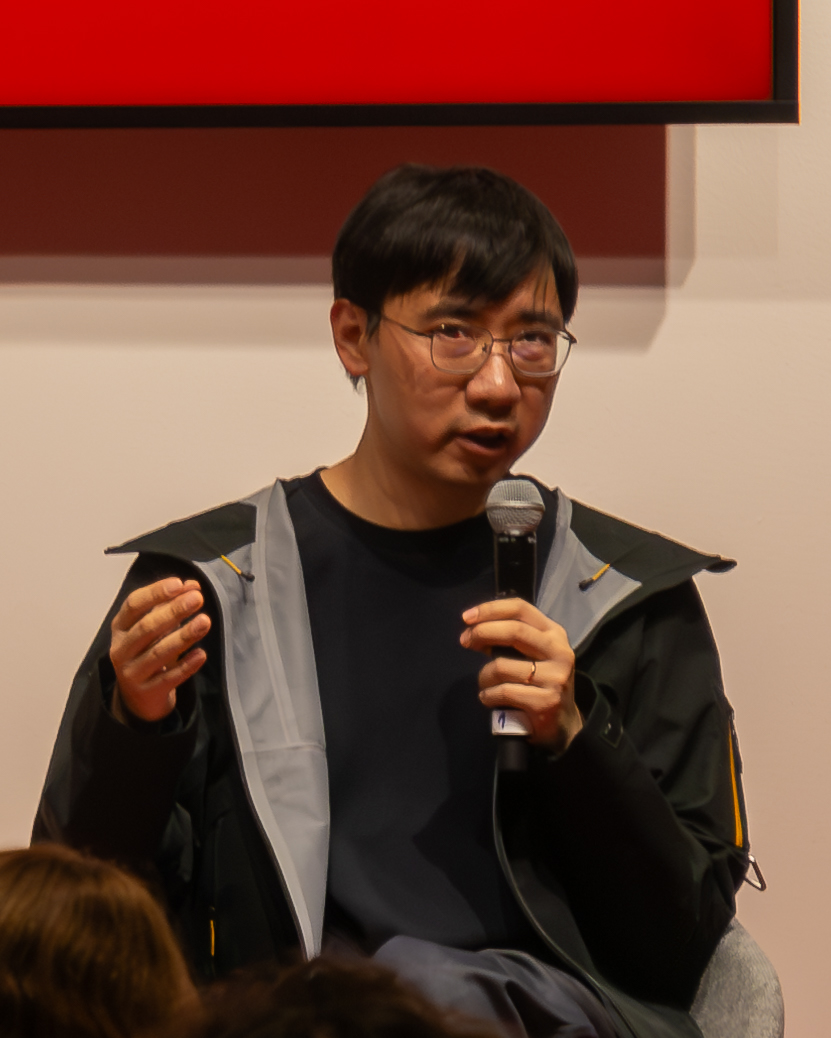
- Born: Li Jun (李峻); 1980 (age 45–46); Guangyuan, Sichuan Province, China
- Education: Master in Philosophy, Katholieke Universiteit Leuven; Master in Philosophy, Peking University
- Occupation: Science Fiction Writer
- Notable work: Three Body X; Ruins of Time; What Has Passed In Kinder Light Appear.

Chinese name
- Simplified Chinese: 宝树
- Traditional Chinese: 寶樹
- Hanyu Pinyin: Bǎoshù

Birth name
- Simplified Chinese: 李峻
- Traditional Chinese: 李峻
- Hanyu Pinyin: Lǐ Jùn

Other name
- Simplified Chinese: 李俊
- Traditional Chinese: 李俊
- Hanyu Pinyin: Lǐ Jùn

Li Jun (李峻; born 1980), known by the pen name Baoshu (宝树), is a Chinese science fiction and fantasy writer. One of his books, Three Body X (published as The Redemption of Time in English), is an unofficial sequel to Death's End by Liu Cixin. Baoshu received his Master of Philosophy at Peking University, and a second master after studying at Katholieke Universiteit Leuven. In 2012 he became a full-time science fiction writer.

One of the latest generation of major Chinese sci-fi writers, Baoshu has won six Nebula Awards for Science Fiction and Fantasy in Chinese, three Galaxy Awards for Chinese Science Fiction, and once nominated for the Grand Media Award for Chinese Literature. He is now a contract writer of famous writer and director Guo Jingming's Zuibook, a leading hub for young fiction writers in China. His works have been translated into English and published in the Magazine of Fantasy and Science Fiction and Clarkesworld.

== Biography ==
Baoshu spent his undergraduate and master's years at Department of Philosophy, Peking University. In PKU he immersed himself in the campus social network BDWM BBS and neighboring Tsinghua University's SMTH BBS, where he chose "Baoshu" as one of his many pseudonyms. Literally meaning "divine tree", the name in fact refers to an evil monk in Louis Cha's famous novella Fox Volant of the Snowy Mountain. Over time, it became his major pseudonym, and relatively well-known on those BBSs. Upon graduation Baoshu went to Belgium, pursuing a Master of Philosophy at KU Leuven, the oldest Catholic university still in existence.

According to a conversation with Xia Jia, a fellow Chinese science fiction writer and a friend of Baoshu, Baoshu had been a loyal fan of Liu Cixin since 2000, when Liu started publishing his short stories. But it was not until 2010, while studying at Leuven, that Baoshu began to compose his own stories. When the third volume of Liu Cixin's The Three-Body Problem trilogy was published in China at the end of 2010, Baoshu was still abroad and had no way to get the book quickly. Luckily, a good friend photocopied every page of the book and sent it to him online. Having read the long work non-stop and greatly inspired by its plot, Baoshu composed a 100,000 characters Dōjin-style sequel, Three Body X: Aeon of Contemplation (三体X•观想之宙), in roughly three weeks. Appearing less than a month after the publication of Death's End, this online sequel caught the attention of many of Liu's readers – and of Liu himself who authorised the publication of the sequel in 2011. It was well received.

== Major works ==
=== The Redemption of Time (Three Body X: Aeon of Contemplation) ===
The first book by Baoshu, an unauthorized fan sequel of Liu Cixin's Remembrance of Earth's Past, intersected with dōjinshi and young-adult fictional experience, which evokes a lot of disagreement and discussion on the Internet, due to its unofficial nature and references to a Japanese pornographic actress. It was later published in 2011 with the permission of Liu Cixin, and Liu's publisher, Chongqing Press. It was published in English by Tor Books as The Redemption of Time in July 2019.

=== Ruins of Time ===
This work relates a story about the contemporary world trapped in a mysterious and unbreakable time loop in one single day—October 11, 2012 and its salvation by a male college student Han Fang and an enigmatic girl he met. This work is one of the first attempts to blend science fiction and Western-style apocalypse theme in Chinese science fiction works and proved to be a great success, winning 2014 saga novel Nebula Award for Chinese science fictions, one of the highest honors of Chinese SF works.

=== What Has Passed Shall in Kinder Light Appear ===
According to Baoshu himself, this story is better understood as alternate history rather than hard-core science fiction. The premise of the story draws on philosophy, and Jean-Paul Sartre, who actually appears in the story. It runs real historical events and personalities in reverse order, to ask some fundamental questions. The starting point is a China where it is now – much technology, industry, a successful host of the Olympics (Bird's Nest stadium). We follow Xie Baosheng from this point over decades as events happen in the reverse order, with world leaders and nations carrying out actions that see the USSR created, then Germany split in two, then the Cultural Revolution, then the Korean War, then the Second World War. Owing to some of its sensitive contents its original Chinese version "Da shidai" (大时代; literally, The Great Era), was circulated unofficially online only, but American SF writer Ken Liu translated it into English and had it published on Fantasy and Science Fiction March/April 2015.

== Bibliography ==
=== Novels ===
- Three Body X: Aeon of Contemplation (《三体X：观想之宙》; 2011)(English: The Redemption of Time; trans. Ken Liu; 2019)
- Ruins of Time (《时间之墟》; 2013)
- Garuda (《金翅鸟》; 2014)
- Maharoga (《伏地龙》; 2014)

=== Short story collections ===
- The Song of Ancient Earth (《古老的地球之歌》; 2012)
- Fantasies of Time (《时间狂想故事集》; 2015)

== See also ==
- Chinese science fiction
- Science Fiction World
- Ken Liu
- Liu Cixin
- Xia Jia
