= Han Song (writer) =

Chinese science fiction writer and journalist

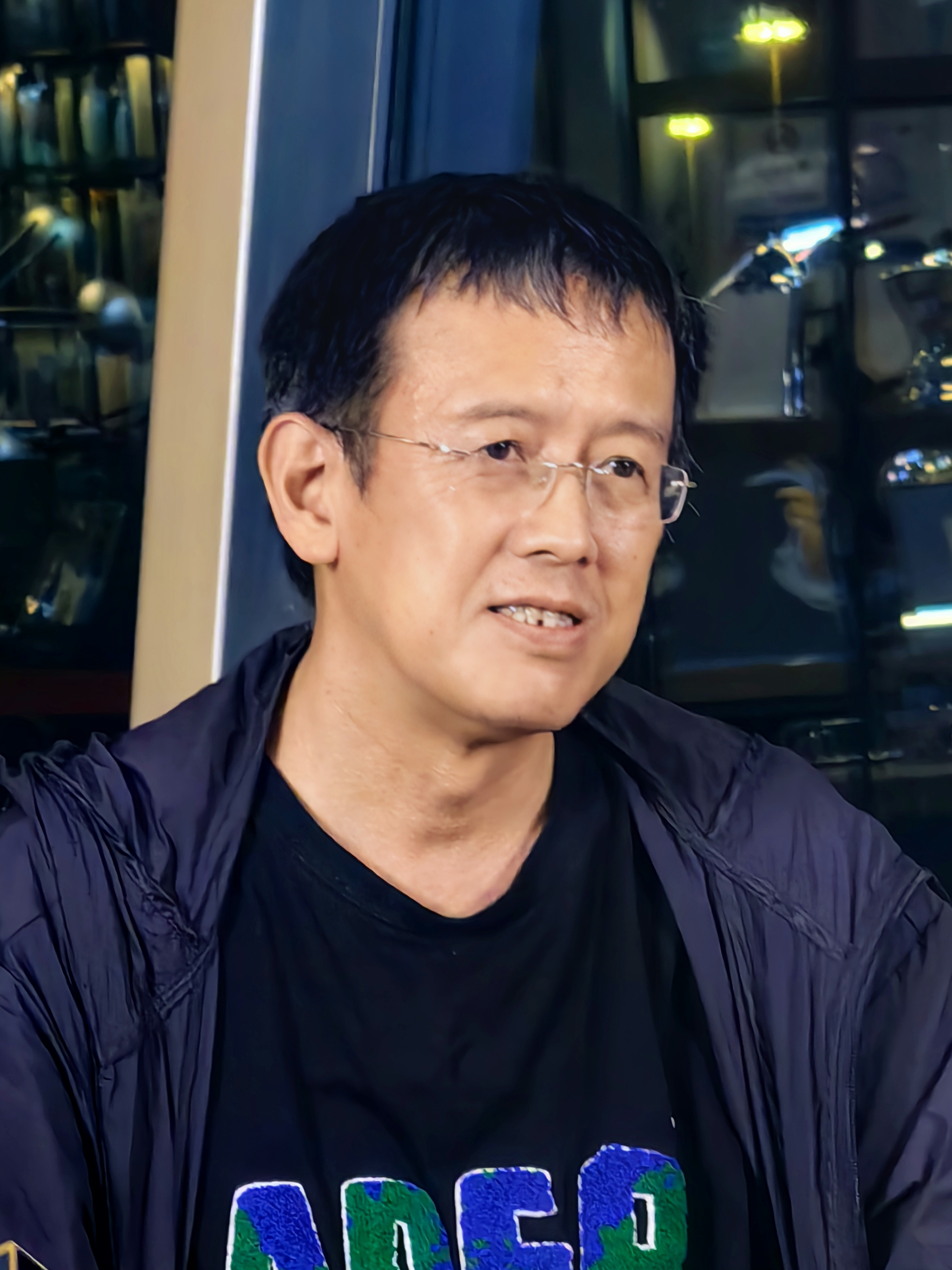
- Han Song (2025)
- Native name: 韩松
- Born: 1965 (age 60–61) Chongqing, China
- Occupation: Editor
- Language: Chinese
- Notable awards: Galaxy Award (six times)

Han Song (Chinese: 韩松; pinyin: Hán Sōng; born 1965) is a Chinese science fiction writer and a journalist at the Xinhua News Agency.

== Life ==
Han was born in 1965 in Chongqing, a year before the Cultural Revolution was launched. During this period, Mao Zedong aimed to "purge" anti-revolutionary elements from Chinese society, including intellectuals and scientists. Nevertheless, Han's father, a journalist, brought home science magazines and books that fascinated his young son.

Han went on to study English and journalism at university. His first novel, Cosmic Tombstones (宇宙墓碑) was published in 1981 in the Taiwanese magazine Huanxiang. It waited ten years for publication in the People's Republic of China because publishers found its tone too dark. It was finally published in 1991, the year Han began working for state news agency Xinhua.

Han has received the Chinese Galaxy Award for fiction six times. The LA Times described him as China's premier science fiction writer. Following a diagnosis of dementia, Han began using Chinese AI chatbot DeepSeek to help him write stories. He told The New York Times in 2025 that he was initially dispirited that the bot sometimes produced better stories than him, but now views it merely as a tool.

== Work ==
Critics have noted Han's ambivalent attitude towards the economic and social change experience in China during his lifetime. According to the China Daily, Han describes himself as a "staunch nationalist at heart", and his work is critical of China's desire to Westernize as fast as possible. He believes that "fast-track development does not agree with core Asian values", and that adoption of the "alien entities" of science, technology and modernization by the Chinese will turn them into monsters.

An overview of his work in Los Angeles Times notes that Han's "prolific body of work deals largely with the clash between the U.S. and the Middle Kingdom," and that "if the author is critical of a cocky America, he is also unafraid to ruthlessly satirize an overreaching China." The New York Times says that although "classic sci-fi elements such as space travel or artificial intelligence" appear in Han's fiction, he is more interested "in how people respond to new technologies and the power and disruption they represent."

Han's writing blends elements of technological dystopianism and Buddhist mysticism. The New York Times describes Han's work as often "bleak, graphic, and grotesque," citing his use of "ordinary settings, like subway trains, as backdrops for wild scenes of cannibalism or orgies."

Regarding the significance of Chinese science fiction, Han contends that contemporary authors "put the country in hypothetically extreme situations to see how people might respond to radical changes. Sometimes they can put China to the test in a way that no mainstream writer can."

A significant amount of Han's work is banned in his home country. In 2012, it was reported that most of his works are banned in mainland China.

== Bibliography ==
=== Novels ===
Han's novels include:

- My Homeland Does Not Dream, whose subject is the state drugging people so that they work while sleeping.
- 2066: Red Star Over America (2000), describing the collapse of the United States in a world dominated by China.
- Red Ocean (2004)
- Subway (2010), a novel of Chinese spacefarers returning to a post-apocalyptic Beijing subway.
- Hospital Trilogy (医院三部曲):
  - Hospital (医院), published in Chinese in June 2016, published in English by Amazon Publishing on March 1, 2023
  - Exorcism (驱魔), published in Chinese in May 2017, published in English by Amazon Publishing on November 28, 2023
  - Dead Souls (亡灵), published in Chinese in May 2018, planned to be published in English by Amazon Publishing on January 7, 2025

=== Short stories ===
- "Mountain Fortress" (Shanzhai 山寨). The short story depicts a group of writers and literary scholars who are taken hostage by event organizers at a remote conference in the mountains. Upon their release, they find that the world has undergone some inexplicable apocalyptic event and become fluid and unstable, with oddities like AK47s transforming into "warped Arabic numerals" and a breed of deer whose brains "cascade over their bodies like waterfalls". The word used as the novel's title (Shanzhai) refers both to a mountain camp (referencing the physical setting of the story) and knockoff products (referencing the story's surreal blurring of boundaries).
- "Tombs of the Universe" (宇宙墓碑), first published 1991 in Illusion SF, later published in the anthology Sinopticon.
- "The Wheel of Samsara" (噶赞寺的转经筒), first published in English translation in the 2009 The Apex Book of World SF edited by Lavie Tidhar.
- "Submarines" (潜艇), first published in Chinese on November 17, 2014 in Southern People Weekly, first published in English in the anthology Broken Stars.
- "Salinger and the Koreans" (塞林格与朝鲜人), first published in Chinese and English in 2016 in Tales of Our Time (故事新编), later published in the anthology Broken Stars.
- "Reunion", published in the anthology The Book of Beijing.
