= The Empire of Corpses =

2015 film by Ryôtarô Makihara

- Promotional poster.
- 屍者の帝国
- Directed by: Ryoutarou Makihara
- Screenplay by: Midori Goto; Hiroshi Seko; Koji Yamamoto
- Based on: The Empire of Corpses by: Keikaku Itoh; Enjoe Toh
- Starring: Yoshimasa Hosoya; Ayumu Murase; Kana Hanazawa; Taiten Kusunoki; Shinichiro Miki; Daiki Yamashita; Akio Ōtsuka; Takayuki Sugō
- Cinematography: Koji Tanaka
- Edited by: Aya Hida
- Music by: Yoshihiro Ike
- Production company: Wit Studio
- Distributed by: Toho Animation
- Release date: October 2, 2015
- Running time: 126 minutes
- Country: Japan
- Language: Japanese
- Box office: $43,000

The Empire of Corpses (屍者の帝国, Shisha no Teikoku) is a 2015 Japanese science fiction adventure horror anime film produced by Wit Studio and directed by Ryoutarou Makihara. The movie is the first of a series of films based on novels written by Keikaku Itoh, followed by Harmony and Genocidal Organ. A three-volume manga by Tomoyuki Hino based on the novel was published by Fujimi Shobo in Monthly Dragon Age from 2015 to 2016.

The film was released on October 2, and Egoist performed the film's ending theme. The film was originally set for release in December, but the date was later changed to October 2. The film is licensed in North America by Funimation, who gave the film a limited theatrical release on April 19–20, 2016, and in the United Kingdom by Anime Limited.

== Plot ==
In an alternate 18th-century Britain, scientist Victor Frankenstein discovered a method of reanimating a corpse with a soul that could think, feel, and speak. After his creation was destroyed another method was used to replace the missing soul with an artificial one known as "Necroware", which can be upgraded like a computer program, though the corpses are unable to talk, feel, or think for themselves. By the 19th century, corpses have become the main part of the labor force, with Necroware improving daily via a machine known as the Analytical Engine, invented by Charles Babbage.

John Watson, a medical student and aspiring corpse engineer, illegally creates his own Necroware to resurrect his deceased friend, Friday, and aspires to find a way to truly return him to life. Eventually, Watson is caught by M, a member of the British Secret Service, and to avoid a prison sentence, he agrees to become an agent for the British Empire. He is then tasked to find and retrieve The Memorandum, Frankenstein's original research on reanimating a corpse with a soul, and which is believed to be in the possession of Alexei Frodorovich Karamazov, a Russian corpse engineer who is hiding in Kabul.

Accompanied by Captain Frederick Burnaby, Watson's bodyguard, and their guide, Nikolai Krasotkin, Watson and Friday reach Khyber Pass, where they are ambushed by upgraded corpses now capable of limited human-like intelligence before they are saved by Hadaly Lilith, the mysterious secretary of former U.S. President Ulysses S. Grant. Afterwards, upon retrieving one of the advanced corpses, Watson discovers it is able to remember and speak its own name.

The group finally reach Karamazov, but the next day, Watson and Friday discover the disillusioned Karamazov forcibly upgrading Nikolai while he is still alive, killing him and creating a more intelligent corpse capable of limited thought and speech. When Watson refuses to accept that it was a part of Frankenstein's original research, Karamazov commits suicide by having the corpsified Nikolai forcibly upgrade him, but not before telling Watson that the Memorandum is in Japan and asking him to destroy it.

In Tokyo, Japan, Waston meets Yamazawa Seigo of the Imperial Japanese Army, who reveals the Memorandum is being held by the Osato Chemical company. As they make their way to it, the group is attacked by advanced corpses, and Watson hurries to find the Memorandum to destroy it. However, upon reaching it, he suddenly hesitates and chooses to analyze the notes, setting off a trap that sets fire to the building and causing all corpses nearby, including Friday, to lash out and Friday to try to speak. Following an explosion, and before losing consciousness, Watson witnesses a mysterious man taking the Memorandum, who reveals himself as Frankenstein's original creation, known as The One – still alive after 100 years and just as intelligent as a human.

Watson awakens aboard the USS Richmond heading for America, where he is treated by Hadaly and is asked along with Burnaby by Grant to help him defeat The One, who he believes is lashing out at humanity as vengeance for creating him. However, Watson spends the voyage trying to help Friday, who has become aggressive and hostile and has been chained up as a result. Upon reaching San Francisco, The One uses the Memorandum to send out a signal that causes corpses to attack humans, including the corpse crew of the USS Richmond. During their escape, Hadaly reveals that she is an artificial lifeform that can control corpses using sound waves and desires a soul of her own. Grant is killed by an exploding corpse, and Hadaly guides Watson and Friday to a sewer entrance that will take them to her safehouse before she and Burnaby briefly part ways. However, the still-hostile Friday attempts to kill Watson, but then begins to recognize him and hesitate long enough for Watson to subdue him. Finally, at Hadaly's safehouse, Watson manages to finish fixing Friday, making him immune to the Memorandum's signal.

Meanwhile, The One is captured by M, who plans to turn all humans into corpses; thus ending every war. He is taken to the Tower of London where his mind is analyzed by Charles Babbage and Frankenstein's preserved brain, which creates a stronger signal that causes more corpses to attack humans. Using a submarine, the USS Nautilus, Watson, Hadaly, Friday, and Burnaby smash through the Traitors' Gate, and Burnaby distracts the corpse guards while the others make their way to M. Hadaly manages to subdue M and use her abilities to suppress The One, while Friday takes over Charles Babbage to stop the signal. However, M manages to shoot Hadaly before being shot by Watson, freeing The One, who then kills M, overpowers Hadaly, and takes over Friday.

Shortly after, The One reveals that he is attempting to create the bride that Frankenstein promised him and combine all the corpses' primitive minds into a true human mind. Then, using the Memorandum, Charles Babbage, and Frankenstein's brain, The One beckons forth his bride's soul and mind and inserts them into Hadaly while transferring his own soul and mind into Friday. However, before he can complete the ritual, Burnaby damages Charles Babbage, forcing The One to return to his own body, and with Friday's help, Watson manages to permanently seal The One into the Memorandum, defeating him and destroying the Tower. Before parting ways, Watson declares that Hadaly is developing of a soul of her own, which prompts her to urge Watson to not give up on truly resurrecting Friday.

Back at the house where he resurrected Friday, Watson and Friday are seen combining the research of Karamazov with the surviving pages of the Memorandum to perform an unknown corpse upgrade on the former. Four years later, in a post-credits scene, Watson is seen fleeing with his new companion, Sherlock Holmes, whilst Burnaby and Hadaly, who now goes by the name Irene Adler, watch from nearby, with what appears to be a fully resurrected Friday also watching from a rooftop.

== Characters ==
Characters	Japanese voice actor	English dubbing actor
John H. Watson	Yoshimasa Hosoya	Jason Liebrecht
Friday (Noble Savage 007)	Ayumu Murase	Todd Haberkorn
Hadaly Lilith	Kana Hanazawa	Morgan Garrett
Frederick Burnaby	Taiten Kusunoki	J. Michael Tatum
Alexei Karamazov	Shinichiro Miki	Mike McFarland
Nikolai Krasotkin	Daiki Yamashita	Micah Solusod
M	Akio Ōtsuka	Sean Hennigan
The One	Takayuki Sugō	R. Bruce Elliott
Seigo Yamazawa	Jirō Saitō	Kenny Green
Ulysses Simpson Grant	Kōji Ishii	Greg Dulcie
Moneypenny	Houko Kuwashima	Caitlin Glass
Thomas Edison	Kōji Takeda	Chris Guerrero
Sherlock Holmes	Yoshimitsu Takasugi	Chuck Huber
Narrator	Issei Futamata	Jason Liebrecht

== Reception ==
The Empire of Corpses grossed $43,000 at the box office.

The Encyclopedia of Science Fiction described The Empire of Corpses as a visually impressive and entertaining steampunk adventure, despite criticizing its unremarkable characterization and plot it considered overcrowded and sometimes incoherent. It argued that the film attempts to incorporate too many ideas and locations into its running time, leaving potentially interesting settings underexplored and introducing inconsistencies in its fictional technology. The encyclopedia compared its combination of historical and fictional characters to the works of Kim Newman and highlighted its exploration of consciousness, the soul and personal identity, including its use of the 21 grams experiment. It also considered the depiction of a worldwide zombie working class a disturbing and intriguing element whose social implications were unfortunately not examined sufficiently.
