= Project Itoh =

Japanese fiction writer

- Born: Satoshi Itō; October 14, 1974; Tokyo, Japan
- Died: March 20, 2009 (aged 34); Tokyo, Japan
- Education: Musashino Art University
- Occupations: Novelist, web designer
- Writing career
- Period: 2007-2008
- Genre: Science fiction
- Website: d.hatena.ne.jp/Projectitoh/

Project Itoh (伊藤 計劃, Itō Keikaku), real name Satoshi Itō (伊藤 聡, Itō Satoshi; October 14, 1974 – March 20, 2009), was a Japanese science fiction writer and essayist.

== History ==
Itō was born in Tokyo and graduated from the Department of Imaging Arts and Sciences at Musashino Art University. While working as a web designer, he wrote Genocidal Organ and submitted it to the Komatsu Sakyō Award contest in 2006. Although it did not receive the award, it was published by Hayakawa Publishing in 2007 and was nominated for the Nihon SF Taisho Award.

From 2001, he had to be hospitalized frequently for recurrent cancer. He died at age 34 on March 20, 2009. The video game Metal Gear Solid: Peace Walker and afterwords of the last volume of the manga Aki Sora were dedicated to his memory. He had written a tie-in novel based on the video game Metal Gear Solid 4: Guns of the Patriots.

A poll by the yearly science-fiction guidebook SF ga Yomitai ranked Genocidal Organ as the number one domestic sci-fi novel of the decade. Hayakawa's S-F Magazine All-Time Best poll in 2014 ranked Harmony as the top of the Japanese SF novels.

Toh Enjoe's Self-Reference ENGINE was also a finalist of Komatsu Sakyō Award and published from Hayakawa Shobō in 2007, along with Itoh's Genocidal Organ. Since then they often appeared together at science fiction conventions and interviews, and collaborated in a few works, until Itoh's death. At the press conference after the announcement of Enjoe's Akutagawa Prize in January 2012, Enjoe revealed the plan to complete Itoh's unfinished novel The Empire of Corpses. It was published in August 2012, and received the Special Award of Nihon SF Taisho Award.

Noitamina, a Fuji Television programming block devoted to anime, announced that they would be adapting three of Itoh's novels into animated feature films. All three films would be handled by different studios and directors. Genocidal Organ directed by Shuko Murase at Manglobe and Geno Studio, Harmony co-directed by Takashi Nakamura and Michael Arias at Studio 4°C and The Empire of Corpses directed by Ryotaro Makihara at Wit Studio. All three films also feature theme songs by Egoist, designs by illustrator redjuice and were to be released in 2015. Genocidal Organ was postponed indefinitely after the closing of studio Manglobe. In 2017, the film was released after being finished by the newly formed Geno Studio.

=== Hideo Kojima ===
Itō befriended game designer Hideo Kojima at the Tokyo Game Show in 1998 shortly after the release of the original Metal Gear Solid. Kojima noted Itō as being one of the only people who understood the themes and morals in his video games, the latter of which would then start to write fan fiction based on Kojima's Metal Gear series. After Itō's diagnosis with cancer, Kojima went against Konami standards and showed Itō footage of Metal Gear Solid 2: Sons of Liberty. Soon after Itō's recovery, and with the release of Metal Gear Solid 4: Guns of the Patriots, Kojima and Itō collaborated on a novelization tie-in of the game. Itō was hospitalized again in February 2009, and Kojima once again released information regarding the next entry of the series, Metal Gear Solid: Peace Walker, to him. Itō, however, died before the release of Peace Walker. The end credits of Peace Walker features a dedication to Itō. Kojima's 2021 autobiographical book The Creative Gene also contains an essay dedicated to Itō which discusses Kojima's relationship with him.

== Awards ==
Japanese Awards

- 2007: Nihon SF Taisho Award nomination for Genocidal Organ
- 2007: S-F Magazine Readers' Award Japanese Short Story for "The Indifference Engine"
- 2009: Nihon SF Taisho for Harmony
- 2009: Seiun Award for Harmony
- 2012: Nihon SF Taisho Award "Special Award" for The Empire of Corpses (with Toh Enjoe)
- 2013: Seiun Award for The Empire of Corpses (with Toh Enjoe)

U.S. Awards

- 2010: Philip K. Dick Award "Special Citation" for Harmony

== Bibliography ==
=== Novels ===
- Gyakusatsu Kikan (虐殺器官) (2007); English translation: Genocidal Organ (2012)
- Metaru Gia Soriddo Ganzu obu za Patoriotto (メタルギア ソリッド ガンズ オブ ザ パトリオット) (2008); English translation: Metal Gear Solid: Guns of the Patriots (2012) — Novelization of Metal Gear Solid 4: Guns of the Patriots
- Hāmonī (ハーモニー) (2008); English translation: Harmony (2010)
- Shisha no Teikoku (屍者の帝国, The Empire of Corpses) (2012) — Co-authored with Toh EnJoe. Published posthumously. (A Partial Translation of The Empire of Corpses at J'Lit Books from Japan)

=== Collections of short stories and essays ===
- Itō Keikaku Kiroku (伊藤計劃記録, Project Itoh Archives) (2010) — A collection of short stories as well as essays from his website, published posthumously
- Itō Keikaku Kiroku: Daini Isō (伊藤計劃記録：第弐位相, Project Itoh Archives: Second Phase) (2011) — A collection of short stories, essays, and his blog text, published posthumously
- The Indifference Engine (2012) — A bunkobon paperback collection of short fiction works

=== Movie reviews collections ===
- Running Pictures (伊藤計劃映画時評集 1) (2013) — Movie reviews collection from his web site
- Cinematrix (伊藤計劃映画時評集 2) (2013) — Movie reviews collection from his web site
