= Harmony (2015 film) =

2015 film by Michael Arias and Takashi Nakamura

- Poster

Japanese name
- Kanji: ハーモニー
Transcriptions
- Revised Hepburn: Hāmonī
- Directed by: Michael Arias; Takashi Nakamura
- Screenplay by: Koji Yamamoto
- Based on: Harmony by Project Itoh
- Starring: Miyuki Sawashiro; Reina Ueda; Aya Suzaki; Yoshiko Sakakibara; Akio Ōtsuka; Shin-ichiro Miki; Chō; Junpei Morita
- Music by: Yoshihiro Ike
- Production company: Studio 4°C
- Distributed by: Toho
- Release date: November 13, 2015
- Running time: 119 minutes
- Country: Japan
- Language: Japanese

Harmony (ハーモニー, Hāmonī) is a 2015 Japanese animated science fiction film directed by Michael Arias and Takashi Nakamura, animated by Studio 4°C and based on the novel of the same name by Project Itoh. The film was released on November 13, 2015. A four-volume manga by Fumi Minato based on the novel was published by Kadokawa Shoten in Newtype from 2015 to 2019. Two other anime films based on novels by the same author were released: The Empire of Corpses on October 2, 2015, and Genocidal Organ on February 3, 2017.

== Synopsis ==
In the future, after a nuclear cataclysm referred to as the "Maelstrom" and ensuing civil wars that almost wiped out humanity, peace and utopia have finally been achieved. Beyond country boundaries, society is controlled by the "Admedistration" and its WatchMe medical nanotechnology, devoted to protecting and extending human life, and is governed by a powerful ethic of social welfare and mutual consideration.

In Japan, three young women—Cian Reikado, Miach Mihie, and Tuan Kirie, the protagonist—reject this supposed "utopia" that lacks any true form of personal autonomy, and attempt suicide together, thereby committing the crime of rejecting life itself. While Miach succeeds in her attempt, Tuan and Cian are saved at the last moment.

Thirteen years later, Tuan is working as a senior investigator for the World Health Organization, but remains faithful to her ideas and delights in punishing her body. When she re-encounters her friend Cian and they recall their suicide pact and the loss of Miach, events unfold that will once again force Tuan to question her world and discover the truth behind this "perfect" world.

== Voice cast ==
Character	Japanese voice actor	English voice actor
Tuan Kirie	Miyuki Sawashiro	Jamie Marchi
Miach Mihie	Reina Ueda	Monica Rial
Cian Reikado	Aya Suzaki	Brittney Karbowski
Os Cara Stauffenberg	Yoshiko Sakakibara	Rachel Robinson
Elijah Vashlov	Shin-ichiro Miki	Christopher Bevins
Keita Saeki	Chō	Mark Stoddard
Nuada Kirie	Junpei Morita	Jeremy Schwartz
Gabrielle Étaín	Akeno Watanabe	Stephanie Young
Uwe Woll	Atsushi Ono	Patrick Seitz
Reiko Mihie	Chiaki Mori	Linda Leonard

== Release ==
The film was released on November 13, 2015, taking the release date of Genocidal Organ due to the latter's delay, moving from the previous release date of December 4. Funimation has picked up the license for Harmony. It was released in the U.S. on May 17–18, 2016 in a two-day engagement.
