= Toh EnJoe =

Japanese author

- 円城 塔
- Born: September 15, 1972 (age 53); Sapporo, Hokkaido, Japan
- Education: Tohoku University (BS); University of Tokyo (PhD)
- Occupation: Author
- Writing career
- Language: Japanese
- Years active: 2008–present
- Genres: Science fiction; Literary fiction
- Notable work: Self-Reference ENGINE (2007)
- Notable awards: Akutagawa Prize (2012); Special Award (Nihon SF Taisho, 2012)

Toh EnJoe (Japanese: 円城 塔, Hepburn: Enjō Tō; pen name, also written as En Joe Toh) (born September 15, 1972) is a Japanese author and television writer. Most of his works are literary fiction or speculative fiction.

== Biography ==
EnJoe was born on 1972 in Sapporo. He graduated from the physics department of Tohoku University, then went on to the graduate school at University of Tokyo and received Ph.D. for a mathematical physical study on the natural languages. He worked as a post-doc researcher at several research institutes for seven years, then abandoned the academic career in 2007, and found a job at a software firm, which he left in 2008 to become a full-time writer.

In 2006, he submitted his science fiction novel Self-Reference ENGINE, made up of a number of related short works, to be considered for the Komatsu Sakyō Award. It was a finalist. It was published the following year by Hayakawa Shobō. In the same year, his short story "Obu za bēsbōru" ("Of the Baseball") won the contest of literary magazine Bungakukai, which became his debut in literary fiction.

His literary fiction work is often dense with allusions. Numerous annotations were added to "Uyūshitan" when it was published in book form in 2009, with none appearing in its initial magazine publication. EnJoe's science fiction works often employ mathematical motifs. The narrator of "Boy's Surface" (2007) is a morphism, and the title is a reference to a geometrical notion. In "Moonshine" (2009), natural numbers are sentient through a savant's mind's eye in a field of the monster group.

Project Itoh's Genocidal Organ was also a finalist of Komatsu Sakyō Award contest. It was published from Hayakawa Shobō in 2007, along with Enjoe's Self-Reference ENGINE. Subsequently, they often appeared together at science fiction conventions and conducting interviews, and collaborated in a few works. Itoh died of cancer in 2009. At the press conference after the announcement of Enjoe's Akutagawa Prize in January 2012, he revealed the plan to complete Itoh's unfinished novel Shisha no teikoku. It was published in August 2012 and received the Special Award of Nihon SF Taisho.

== Awards ==
=== Japanese ===
- 2010: Noma Prize for New Writers for Uyūshitan
- 2012: Akutagawa Prize for "Dōkeshi no chō (Harlequin's Butterfly)"
- 2012: Nihon SF Taisho Special Award for Shisha no teikoku (The Empire of Corpses) (with Project Itoh)
- 2013: Seiun Award Japanese Long Form for Shisha no teikoku (with Project Itoh)
- 2017: Kawabata Yasunari Prize for Literature for "Mojika"
- 2018: Nihon SF Taisho for Mojika

=== US ===
- 2014: Philip K. Dick Award Special Citation for Self-Reference ENGINE

== Works ==
=== Translated into English ===
==== English translations (book length) ====
- Self-Reference ENGINE (trans. Terry Gallagher), Haikasoru/VIZ Media, 2013
- Harlequin Butterfly (trans. David Boyd), Pushkin, 2024

==== Short fiction in English translation ====
- "Freud" (excerpt from Self-Reference ENGINE) (Speculative Japan 2, Kurodahan Press, 2011)
- "Silverpoint" (Japan Earthquake Charity Literature, Waseda Bungaku, 2011)
- "Meditations on Green" (Monkey Business, Volume 2, A Public Space, 2012)
- "Endoastronomy" (The Future Is Japanese, Haikasoru/VIZ Media, 2012)
- "The History of the Decline and Fall of the Galactic Empire" (Words Without Borders, July 2012 )
- "Harlequin's Butterfly" (Excerpt) (Asymptote, Jan 2013 )
- "Time in "Time"" (essay) (Monkey Business, Volume 3, A Public Space, 2013)
- "Printable" (Granta, Issue 127, Granta Publications, 2014)
- "A Record of My Grandmother" (Monkey Business, Volume 4, A Public Space, 2014)
- "List, Combination, Recursion" (essay) (The Battle Royale Slam Book, Haikasoru/VIZ Media, 2014)
- "Time Together" (2014 PEN World Voices Online Anthology, PEN American Center, 2014)
- "Three Twitter Stories" (2014 PEN World Voices Online Anthology, PEN American Center, 2014)
- "First Sentence" (essay) (Granta Online Edition, 7 May 2014, Granta Publications, 2014)
- "Twelve Twitter Stories" (Monkey Business, Volume 5, A Public Space, 2015)
- "The Squirrel Awakes" (Kindle Single, 2015)
- "Overdrive" (Saiensu Fikushon 2016, Haikasoru/VIZ Media, 2016)
- "Shuffle Drive" (Monkey Business, Volume 7, A Public Space, 2017)
- "Shadow.net" (The Ghost in the Shell: Five New Short Stories, Vertical/Media Tie In, 2017)

=== Scripts ===
- "I'm Never Remembering You, Baby" (Space Dandy episode 11, 2014) – writer
- "An Other-Dimensional Tale, Baby" (Space Dandy episode 24, 2014) – writer, guest character design
- Godzilla Singular Point (2021) – writer, series composition
- The Ghost in the Shell (2026) – writer, series composition

== Reception ==
An interviewer in the literary journal Asymptote wrote, "Toh EnJoe's stories are known for their scientific lucidity and literary impenetrability. His language and his writing style, however, belie his background as a physicist: topics woven into his stories include science, but also linguistics, literary theory, and philosophical approaches to the imagination. His complicated narrative structures are the subject of heated discussions and have even evoked harsh reviews calling his work 'indigestible', 'sleep-inducing,' and 'reader-unfriendly'."

== Additional reading ==
- INTERVIEW: Toh EnJoe, Author of Self-Reference ENGINE (SF Signal)
