= Reiko Suzuki =

Japanese voice actress (born 1944)

- Born: 15 August 1944 (age 82); Tokyo, Japan
- Occupation: Voice actress
- Years active: 1977–present
- Agent: Arts Vision

Reiko Suzuki (鈴木れい子, Suzuki Reiko; born 15 August 1944) is a Japanese voice actress.

== Filmography ==
=== Television animation ===
1970s

- Wakakusa no Charlotte

1980s

- Birth
- Dragon Ball (1986) (Old Woman (episode 4), Sno's Mother)
- Golden Warrior Gold Lightan
- Lady!! (Brenda)

1990s

- The Wonderful Galaxy of Oz
- Yaiba

2000s

- Dennō Coil

2010s

- JoJo's Bizarre Adventure: Stardust Crusaders (2014) (Enya)
- Rin-ne (2016) (Tama)
- Wistoria: Wand and Sword (Cauldron)

unknown date

- GeGeGe no Kitarō

=== Original net animation ===
- Steel Ball Run: JoJo's Bizarre Adventure (2026) – Fortune Teller

=== Theatrical animation ===
- Mobile Suit Gundam I (1981) (Hayato's Mother)
- Birth (1984) (Grandma)
- Dragon Ball: The Legend of Shenlong (1986) (Pansy's Mother)
- Shin Kimagure Orange Road: Summer's Beginning (1996) (Grandma)
- Bayonetta: Bloody Fate (2013) (Umbran Elder)
- Kukuriraige: Sanxingdui Fantasy (Cancelled)

=== Video games ===
- God of War (2005) (Narrator)
- God of War II (2007) (Gaia, Narrator)
- God of War III (2010) (Gaia, Narrator)
- JoJo's Bizarre Adventure: Eyes of Heaven (2015) (Enya)
- Bayonetta: Wii U Edition (2014) (Umbran Elder)
- Bayonetta 2 (2014) (Umbran Elder)
- Senran Kagura: Estival Versus (2015) (Sayuri)
- Gundam Breaker 3 (2016) (Irato granny)

=== Tokusatsu ===
- Tokusou Sentai Dekaranger (Shinnooian Hakutaku (ep. 25, 34, 49))
- Ressha Sentai ToQger (Marchioness Morc (eps. 27 - 47), Kuliner Announce (eps. 11 - 12, 27))
- Ressha Sentai ToQger vs. Kyoryuger: The Movie (Marchioness Morc)
- Ressha Sentai ToQger Returns: Super ToQ 7gou of Dreams (Marchioness Morc)

=== Dubbing ===
- The Elder Scrolls V: Skyrim, Elenwen, Boethiah (Jean Gilpin)
- The Mule, Mary (Dianne Wiest)
- Nancy Drew and the Hidden Staircase, Flora (Linda Lavin)
- The NeverEnding Story, Urgl (Patricia Hayes)
- A Series of Unfortunate Events, The Woman with Hair but No Beard (Beth Grant)
- Young Adult, Jan (Mary Beth Hurt)
