= Golden Warrior Gold Lightan =

Japanese anime television series

- Screenshot showing Gold Lightan reaching his hand out to Hiro.
- 黄金戦士ゴールド・ライタン
- Genre: Mecha
- Created by: Tatsunoko Production Planning Office
- Developed by: Akiyoshi Sakai
- Directed by: Kōichi Mashimo (chief)
- Music by: Masaaki Jinbo; Masayuki Yamamoto
- Country of origin: Japan
- Original language: Japanese
- No. of episodes: 52 (list of episodes)

Production
- Executive producer: Kenji Yoshida
- Producer: Tomoyuki Miyata
- Production company: Tatsunoko Production

Original release
- Network: TV Tokyo
- Release: 1 March 1981 – 18 February 1982

Related
- Manga

Ōgon Senshi Gold Lightan Camp!
- Written by: Ruma Onbutsu
- Illustrated by: Lotus; Rena Mikami
- Magazine: Comic Polca
- Original run: December 23, 2022 – present

Golden Warrior Gold Lightan (黄金戦士ゴールド・ライタン, Ōgon Senshi Gōrudo Raitan) is a mecha anime television series that aired from 1981 to 1982 in Japan. The show was also popular in Hong Kong and was aired there around the same time. There are 52 episodes that were aired at 30 minutes each.

== Original story ==
The story is about a young boy named Hiro Taikai who finds a gold lighter. The lighter turns out to be the giant Golden Warrior Gold Lightan, who has the mission to save the Earth from an invasion by King Ibalda. Gold Lightan joined forces with his robot teammates to ruin the plots of King Ibalda and destroy invading alien robots by using his surpassing hand and leg strikes. Hiro also founded a group called the "Bratty Rangers" with his friends.

== Concept ==
The robot is usually disguised as a tiny gold Zippo-style lighter in Hiro's pocket. When called upon, Gold Lightan transforms into a giant robot towering at 30 m (98 ft) and weighing 200 tons. All robots in the show are sentient and do not require pilots. The robot usually ends a battle with a trademark golden hand stab move which drives a hand strike cutting the enemy robots body, pulling out and smashing the heartbox energy device.

== Staff ==
- Presenter: Kenji Yoshida
- Planners: Ippei Kuri, Shigeru Yanagawa
- Producer: Tomoyuki Miyata
- Series composition: Akiyoshi Sakai
- Chief director: Koichi Mashimo
- Character design: Ippei Kuri
- Mecha design: Shoji Kawamori
- Music: Masayuki Jinbo, Masayuki Yamamoto
- Animation director: Takashi Nakamura (Episode 6, 22, 30, 41, 48)
- Key animation: Takashi Nakamura (Episode 41)

== Characters ==
Japanese name	Japanese full name	Voices by
Hiro	Hiroshi Taikai	Yō Inoue
Sam	Osamu Nanjo	Yūji Mitsuya
Emmy	Emi Takakura	Saeko Shimazu
Monkey	Monkichi Kogarashi	Reiko Suzuki
Tonbo	Tomokazu Gokuraku	Satomi Majima
Big	Futoshi Mizuki	Minoru Inaba
Ohina	Hinako Taikai	Yūko Mita
Aburada	Happei Aburada	Akira Murayama
Momiji	Momiji Akino	Takumi Miura
Gold Lightan	Gold Lightan	Issei Futamata
King Ivalda	King Ivalda	Kazuya Tatekabe
Mannakka	Mannakka	Naoko Koda
Uyokka	Uyokka	Shōzō Iizuka
Sayokka	Sayokka	Daisuke Gōri
Mister Mecha X	Mister Mecha X	Tomomichi Nishimura

=== Lightan robots ===
Name	Toy release number	Toy release date	Transform to	TV show colors	Original toy colors	Reissue toy colors
Gold Lightan (ゴールドライタン, Gōrudo Raitan)	GB-37	1981	Lighter	Gold	1. Gold; 2. Gold body, black head, arm, legs	1. Gold with black arm 2. Gold
Gold Lightan is the leader of the Golden Warrior team. He was the first robot found by Hiro, the lead boy character in the story. In times of crisis, he makes the decision to call upon his fellow robot friends for assistance. His trademark hand stab move of reaching into the heart of the enemy to grab the heart energy device makes him a leader and finisher in battle.
Scope Lightan (スコープライタン, Sukōpu Raitan)	GB-38	1981	Scope	Silver	Gold	1. Gold; 2. Silver
Scope Lightan is one of the assistant robots. He transforms into a scope device. In battle he specializes in searching for enemies or locating their weak focal points.
Time Lightan (タイムライタン, Taimu Raitan)	GB-40	1981	Timer	Silver	Gold	1. Gold; 2. Silver
Time Lightan is one of the assistant robots. He transforms into a timer capable of freezing time for a 30 seconds at most. He is a limited as a fighter in combat, though his ability to manipulate time would prove to be useful for the team.
Denji Lightan (デンジライタン, Denji Raitan)	GB-41	1981	Magnify glass and Compass	Gold	Gold pyramid surface on chest	1. Gold pyramid surface on chest 2. Gold smooth surface on chest
Denji Lightan is one of the assistant robots. He is often referred to as Map Lightan though the translation is more of an Electromagnetic Lightan. He transforms into a reconnaissance device containing a magnifying glass and a compass. He provides directional help as a reconnaissance expert.
Mechanic Lightan (メカニックライタン, Mekanikku Raitan)	GB-42	1981	Tool Chest Box	Gold	Gold	Gold
Mechanic Lightan is one of the assistant robots. He transforms into a tool chest box containing the necessary equipment for damage repair and other mechanical functions. He is perhaps the least mobile in the group, but acts as a handy repairman at any given time.
Coin Lightan (コインライタン, Koin Raitan)	GB-81	1982	Coin Case	Silver	Silver	1. Silver; 2. Gold
Coin Lightan is one of the assistant robots. He transforms into a coin case.
Print Lightan (プリントライタン, Purinto Raitan)	GB-82	1982	Print Stamp	Gold	Gold	Gold
Print Lightan is one of the assistant robots. He transforms into a print stamp.
Light Lightan (ライトライタン, Raito Raitan)	GB-83	1982	Light	Gold	Gold	Gold
Light Lightan is one of the assistant robots. He transforms into a light source.
Cutter Lightan (カッターライタン, Kattā Raitan)	GB-84	1982	Pencil Sharpener	Gold	Gold	Gold
Cutter Lightan is one of the assistant robots. He transforms into a pencil sharpener.
Meter Lightan (メートルライタン, Mētoru Raitan)	GB-85	1982	Measurement Device	Gold	Gold	Gold
Meter Lightan is one of the assistant robots. He is often referred to as Metal Lightan. He transforms into a measurement device.
I.C. Lightan (アイシーライタン, Aishī Raitan)	GB-86	1982	Processing Unit	Black and Silver	Black and Silver	Black and Silver
I.C. Lightan is one of the assistant robots. He transforms into a processing unit. The I.C stands for "Interpret Computer". He is essentially a robotic computer acting as a translator and database for biological or any other type of information.

== Media ==
=== Anime ===
==== Episodes ====
This is a list of episodes from the television show Golden Warrior Gold Lightan in order by production number.

No.	Title	Directed by	Written by	Original release date
1	"Demon of the Mecha Dimension" "Meka Jigen no Akuma" (Japanese: メカ次元の悪魔)	Koichi Mashimo	Akiyoshi Sakai	March 1, 1981
2	"Strange! A Catfish Eats a Dam" "Kai! Namazu ga Damu wo Ku" (Japanese: 怪! ナマズがダムを食う)	Yoriyasu Kogawa	Keiji Kubota	March 8, 1981
3	"Goodbye Yukigon" "Sayonara Yukigon" (Japanese: さよならユキゴン)	Koichi Mashimo; Mizuho Nishikubo	Akiyoshi Sakai	March 15, 1981
4	"Hell's Leisure Land" "Jigoku no Rejārando" (Japanese: 地獄のレジャーランド)	Yukihiko Uchida	Kazuo Sato	March 22, 1981
5	"Heat Light Crystaman" "Netsu Ko Kuristaman" (Japanese: 熱光クリスタマン)	Futoshi Takano	Takeshi Shudo	March 29, 1981
6	"Who is the Informant?" "Mikkokusha wa Dare da?" (Japanese: 密告者はだれだ?)	Yoriyasu Kogawa	Keiji Kubota	April 2, 1981
7	"Evil Runaway Robot" "Ma no Bōsō Robotto" (Japanese: 魔の暴走ロボット)	Yukihiko Uchida; Shohei Ishida	Akiyoshi Sakai	April 9, 1981
8	"Subway Centipede Operation" "Chikatetsu Mukade Sakusen" (Japanese: 地下鉄ムカデ作戦)	Yoriyasu Kogawa	Takeshi Shudo	April 16, 1981
9	"The City of Mecha Cosmos" "Meka Kosumosu no Machi" (Japanese: メカコスモスの街)	Koichi Mashimo	Akira Momoi	April 23, 1981
10	"Dragonfly UFO" "Tonbo no UFO" (Japanese: トンボのUFO)	Mizuho Nishikubo	Kazuo Sato	April 30, 1981
11	"Bomb Mecha Swan" "Bakudan Meka Hakuchō" (Japanese: 爆弾メカ白鳥)	Yoriyasu Kogawa	Masaaki Sakurai	May 7, 1981
12	"The Monster of the Forgotten Village" "Yo Wasuremura no Kaijin" (Japanese: 世忘れ村の怪人)	Mizuho Nishikubo	Takeshi Shudo	May 14, 1981
13	"Ohina in Danger" "Ohina Kiki Ippatsu" (Japanese: オヒナ危機一発)	Yukihiko Uchida; Koji Sawai	Tomomi Tsutsui	May 21, 1981
14	"Rebellion Mecha Hell" "Hanran Meka Jigoku" (Japanese: 反乱メカ地獄)	Shohei Ishida	Mitsuo Aimono	May 28, 1981
15	"Mecha Demon Dragon of the Skies" "Ōzora no Meka Maryū" (Japanese: 大空のメカ魔竜)	Yoriyasu Kogawa	Akiyoshi Sakai	June 4, 1981
16	"Devil's Mini Spy" "Akuma no Mini Supai" (Japanese: 悪魔のミニスパイ)	Mizuho Nishikubo	Akiyoshi Sakai	June 11, 1981
17	"Farewell Dolphin Day" "Saraba Iruka no Hi" (Japanese: さらばイルカの日)	Yoriyasu Kogawa; Shohei Ishida	Takeshi Shudo	June 18, 1981
18	"Operation Gallivander" "Garibendā Daisakusen" (Japanese: ガリベンダー大作戦)	Asuma Kusa; Koji Sawai	Mitsuo Aimono	June 25, 1981
19	"Ohina is a Circus Star" "Ohina wa Sākasu Sutā" (Japanese: オヒナはサーカススター)	Koichi Mashimo; Yoriyasu Kogawa	Masaaki Sakurai	July 2, 1981
20	"Newtonder of Love" "Koi no Nyūtondā" (Japanese: 恋のニュートンダー)	Yasuo Ishikawa; Shohei Ishida	Takeshi Shudo	July 9, 1981
21	"Mecha Ninjutsu Shadow Clone" "Meka Ninpō Kage Bunshin" (Japanese: メカ忍法影分身)	Mizuho Nishikubo	Keiji Kubota	July 16, 1981
22	"Living Doll" "Ikite Iru Ningyō" (Japanese: 生きている人形)	Mizuho Nishikubo; Koji Sawai	Takeshi Shudo; Tomoyuki Miyata	July 23, 1981
23	"The Mecha are Art Thieves" "Bijutsu Dorobō wa Mekaso" (Japanese: 美術泥棒はメカソ)	Shohei Ishida	Kazuo Sato	July 30, 1981
24	"All 6 Lightans" "Seizoroi Rokunin Raitan" (Japanese: 勢揃い6人ライタン)	Yasuo Ishikawa; Hiroyuki Kino	Keiji Kubota	August 6, 1981
25	"Nessie's Wild Journey" "Neshī Abare Tabi" (Japanese: ネッシーあばれ旅)	Koichi Mashimo	Akiyoshi Sakai; Tomoyuki Miyata	August 13, 1981
26	"The Great Storm" "Ōrashi Daifūjin" (Japanese: 大嵐だいふうじん)	Yoriyasu Kogawa; Shohei Ishida	Takeshi Shudo	August 20, 1981
27	"Dracula Panic" "Dorakkyura Panikku" (Japanese: ドラキュラパニック)	Rei Maruwa; Koji Sawai	Mitsuo Aimono	August 27, 1981
28	"Mysterious Jungle Gym" "Nazo no Janguru Jimu" (Japanese: 謎のジャングルジム)	Asuma Kusa; Takaaki Ishiyama	Akiyoshi Sakai	September 3, 1981
29	"Terrifying Beauty Contest" "Kyōfu no Bijin Kontesuto" (Japanese: 恐怖の美人コンテスト)	Mizuho Nishikubo; Hiroko Tokita	Tomomi Tsutsui	September 10, 1981
30	"Mysterious Ibaruda Palace" "Ibaruda Kyūden no Nazo" (Japanese: イバルダ宮殿の謎)	Koichi Mashimo; Yoriyasu Kogawa	Takeshi Shudo	September 17, 1981
31	"Surprised Rat Mole" "Bikkuri Nezumogura" (Japanese: びっくりネズモグラ)	Aritoki Sugiyama; Shohei Ishida	Mitsuo Aimono	September 24, 1981
32	"Snow Woman Koranka" "Yukionna Kōranka" (Japanese: 雪女コーランカ)	Yasuo Ishikawa	Tomomi Tsutsui	October 1, 1981
33	"Love Trouble Operation" "Ai no Toraburu Sakusen" (Japanese: 愛のトラブル作戦)	Rei Maruwa; Koji Sawai	Tomomi Tsutsui	October 8, 1981
34	"The Mermaid Princess of Demon Cape" "Majin Misaki no Ningyo Hime" (Japanese: 魔人岬の人魚姫)	Yoriyasu Kogawa	Keiji Kubota	October 16, 1981
35	"The Puzzle Doctor's Trap" "Pazuru Hakase no Wana" (Japanese: パズル博士の罠)	Mizuho Nishikubo	Takeshi Shudo; Kaoru Kinoshita	October 22, 1981
36	"The Bratty Detective Arrives" "Wanpaku Tantei Sanjō" (Japanese: わんぱく探偵参上)	Koji Sawai	Tomomi Tsutsui	October 29, 1981
37	"The Lightan Corps' Weakness" "Raitan Gundan no Jakuten" (Japanese: ライタン軍団の弱点)	Koichi Mashimo; Takaaki Ishiyama	Akiyoshi Sakai	November 5, 1981
38	"Animals of the Great Plains" "Daiheigen no Dobutsutachi" (Japanese: 大平原の動物たち)	Yasuo Ishikawa; Masayuki Kojima	Tomomi Tsutsui	November 12, 1981
39	"Mecha Dimension Straight Line" "Meka Jigen Icchokusen" (Japanese: メカ次元一直線)	Shohei Ishida; Koji Sawai	Keiji Kubota	November 19, 1981
40	"Mysterious Underwater Palace" "Nazo no Kaitei Kyūden" (Japanese: 謎の海底宮殿)	Takaaki Ishiyama	Takeshi Shudo; Kaoru Kinoshita	November 26, 1981
41	"The Great Demon's Tears" "Daimajin no Namida" (Japanese: 大魔神の涙)	Yoriyasu Kogawa	Akiyoshi Sakai	December 3, 1981
42	"Terror of the Demon Army" "Makai Gundan no Kyōfu" (Japanese: 魔界軍団の恐怖)	Mizuho Nishikubo	Akiyoshi Sakai	December 10, 1981
43	"The Mecha Dimension's Greatest Crisis" "Meka Jigen Saidai no Kiki" (Japanese: メカ次元最大の危機)	Koichi Mashimo; Koji Sawai	Keiji Kubota	December 17, 1981
44	"Castaway on a Volcanic Island" "Kazanto no Hyōryūsha" (Japanese: 火山島の漂流者)	Mizuho Nishikubo; Hiroko Tokita	Akiyoshi Sakai	December 24, 1981
45	"The Mysterious Country of Yamaterasu" "Maboroshi no Yamaterasu Koku" (Japanese: 幻のヤマテラス国)	Yasuo Ishikawa; Masayuki Kojima	Shigeru Sato; Akiyoshi Sakai	December 31, 1981
46	"Duel of the Magma Giants" "Maguma Kyojin no Kettō" (Japanese: マグマ巨人の決斗)	Koji Sawai	Keiji Kubota; Akiyoshi Sakai	January 7, 1982
47	"Love Aburada's Great Victory" "Koi no Aburada Daishori" (Japanese: 恋のアブラダ大勝利)	Yoriyasu Kogawa	Takeshi Shudo	January 14, 1982
48	"Target! Mannacker" "Hyōteki! Mannakkā" (Japanese: 標的！マンナッカー)	Mizuho Nishikubo	Koichi Mashimo; Mizuho Nishikubo	January 21, 1982
49	"Mecha Palace Rebellion" "Meka Kyūden no Hanran" (Japanese: メカ宮殿の反乱)	Koichi Mashimo; Takaaki Ishiyama	Akiyoshi Sakai	January 28, 1982
50	"Mr. Mecha X's Challenge" "Misutā Meka X no Chosen" (Japanese: ミスターメカXの挑戦)	Yoriyasu Kogawa	Akiyoshi Sakai	February 4, 1982
51	"The Last Day of Mecha Palace" "Meka Kyūden Saigo no Hi" (Japanese: メカ宮殿最期の日)	Yasuo Ishikawa	Akiyoshi Sakai	February 11, 1982
52	"Goodbye Lightan Corps" "Sayonara Raitan Gundan" (Japanese: さよならライタン軍団)	Koichi Mashimo; Koji Sawai	Akiyoshi Sakai	February 18, 1982

=== Manga ===
A spin-off manga written by Ruma Onbutsu and illustrated by Lotus and Rena Mikami began serialization on the Comic Polca website in December 2022.

== Merchandise ==
In 2005, Hong Kong Bandai reissued the semi-original robots as part of the Soul of Chogokin label. The individual robots were released with a hard plastic display case, robot footstand, red carpet storage box, interchangeable gold hands pieces, and an enemy's heartbox energy device. This version also feature the robots with high quality 18K gold plating. The toys can be purchased individually or as a set. There are 2 known sets in the reissues. One is the first generation grey box, available in Hong Kong and Japan, featuring 6 of the robots, while the other is an exclusive redcarpet wooden box set, known to be available only in Japan, featuring all 11 robots.

Later, in 2005, replicas were re-released by Hung Hing toys in Hong Kong and Macau featuring the robots built in cheaper die-cast metals. The texture and few minor details were inconsistent between the products. Multiple variations of the toys were sold as well. One such version is the large toy Gold Lightan measuring at 11.5 inches in height when standing in robot form, although only 2,000 were manufactured. Additionally, at the base of the foot, of the toy, is a label counting the manufactured number out of 2,000. Other variations include team robots in different colors or grey low weight plastic/silver exclusive to Hong Kong and Macau.

There are more variations and replicas of Gold Lightan than any others because it is the lead robot in the series. There are other design variations. For example, older models of I.C. Lightan uses AA batteries to light up its LED eye, while newer reissues of the toy uses flat button or coin batteries. None of these re-releases are completely identical to the original 1980s GB series Chogokin toy launch from 1979 to 1983, by Popy Pleasure. The originals are valued at a higher price, as they were constructed with different grades of diecast metals as well as high quality acrylonitrile butadiene styrene.

In 2006, Bandai released a new version of the Gold Lightan in their Soul of Chogokin line-up - GX 32 The Gold Lightan. Not only were they considered to be one of the most detailed and sophisticated Gold Lightan toys yet, they were plated with 18K gold, as their predecessors were. Aside from being able to transform into a lighter, just like the original toys, its joints were well structured. The package comes with a stand, interchangeable hands, and a heartbox energy device. The toy was a success and was well received by fans in Japan and Hong Kong. This caused Bandai Hong Kong to make a singular stand showcase just for the Gold Lightan, itself.

The titular robot is a playable character in the fighting game Tatsunoko vs. Capcom. When he fights, he can only be single as opposed to character doubles; this is because the robot is so big and powerful.
