= Kukuriraige: Sanxingdui Fantasy =

Unreleased anime film

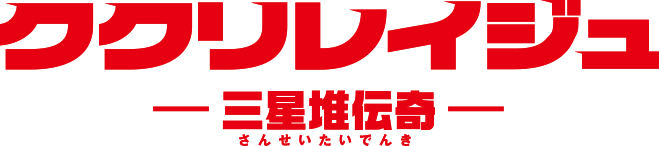

Japanese name
- Kanji: ククリレイジュ -三星堆伝奇-
Transcriptions
- Revised Hepburn: Kukurireiju: Sanseitai Denki
- Directed by: Fumikazu Satou
- Written by: Huang Jun
- Starring: Marie Miyake; Daisuke Ono; Junya Enoki; Tesshō Genda; Miyuki Sawashiro; Taiten Kusunoki; Takehito Koyasu; Katsuhiko Sasaki; Kaori Yamagata; Reiko Suzuki; Risae Matsuda
- Music by: Keiji Inai
- Production company: Zero-G
- Distributed by: AEON Entertainment
- Countries: Japan; China
- Language: Japanese

Kukuriraige: Sanxingdui Fantasy (Japanese: ククリレイジュ -三星堆伝奇-, Hepburn: Kukurireiju: Sanseitai Denki) is an unreleased animated steampunk fantasy film directed by Fumikazu Satou. It would have been the first feature film produced by anime veteran Hiroshi Negishi's Zero-G animation studio, with that status being taken by their film adaptation of the manga series Break of Dawn. It was originally set to be released by AEON Entertainment on February 7, 2020, but due to production issues related to the COVID-19 pandemic, the film was removed from the 2020 release schedule. Jewelpet Attack Travel!, a short film based on Sanrio's Jewelpet franchise and directed by Negishi for Ashi Productions, was set to be attached to it; and was later rescheduled for release as an original net animation on May 14, 2022, in a livestream on Niconico Live. During that livestream, it was confirmed that the film would not be released at any point in the foreseeable future.

== Plot ==
=== Settings ===
The film is set in China's Sichuan province, and is based around the ancient Sanxingdui ruins in Guanghan.

=== Synopsis ===
Thousands of years ago, a large civilization existed deep underground. There, an artificial sun called "skylight" brought light to its people. In ancient times, the "Masked King" Sheargan appeared, sealed the "Kukuri" that plagued the underground world, and turned on the skylight to release people from the darkness. Sheargan was worshiped as a savior and became an absolute being. Serving the Sheargan and managing the skylight is a family whose mission is to illuminate the dark. Siblings Lilyn and Sauda are searching for the fuel for the skylight, "Raige", as it is getting less and less. While doing so, Lilyn meets a man names Masala, who resides in a village where the skylight has been turned off after angering Sheargan. While working with Masala, Lilyn and Sauda get to know the existence of a world that they had not seen. The story will change the fate of the brother and sister, as well as the underground world.

Lilyn (リィリン)
Voiced by: Marie Miyake
Sauda (サウダ)
Voiced by: Daisuke Ono
Masala (マサラ)
Voiced by: Junya Enoki
Sheargan (シーアルガン)
Voiced by: Tesshō Genda
Pacti (パクティ)
Voiced by: Miyuki Sawashiro
Taba (ターバ)
Voiced by: Taiten Kusunoki
Gousha (ゴウシャ)
Voiced by: Takehito Koyasu
Tsurugi (ツルギ)
Voiced by: Katsuhiko Sasaki
Olive (オリブ)
Voiced by: Kaori Yamagata
Grandma Mado (マド婆)
Voiced by: Reiko Suzuki
Luke (ルーク)
Voiced by: Risae Matsuda

== See also ==
- Batgirl - a DC Studios film that met a similar fate
- Scoob! Holiday Haunt - a Warner Bros. Pictures Animation film that met a similar fate in 2022
- Yuri on Ice: Ice Adolescence - a theatrical continuation of the 2016 anime series that met a similar fate in 2024
