= Katsuhiko Sasaki =

Japanese actor (born 1944)

- 佐々木 勝彦
- Born: December 24, 1944 (age 81); Tokyo, Japan
- Occupations: Actor; voice actor
- Years active: 1968–present
- Height: 177 cm (5 ft 10 in)
- Father: Minoru Chiaki

Katsuhiko Sasaki (佐々木 勝彦, Sasaki Katsuhiko; born December 24, 1944) is a Japanese actor and voice actor from Tokyo, Japan. He is the son of Minoru Chiaki.

== Education ==
Born in Tokyo, Sasaki graduated from the Hosei University Faculty of Business Administration.

== Filmography ==
=== Films ===
- Battle of Okinawa (1971) (Communications Officer)
- The Sound of Waves (1971) (Yasuo Kawamoto)
- Godzilla vs. Megalon (1973) (Goro Ibuki)
- Terror of Mechagodzilla (1975) (Akira Ichinose)
- Queen Bee (1978)
- Godzilla vs. Biollante (1989) (Soldier)
- Godzilla vs. King Ghidorah (1991) (Professor Mazaki)
- Midnight Eagle (2007) (The Chief of Staff, Joint Staff)
- Isoroku (2011) (Koshirō Oikawa)
- Pale Moon (2014)
- Our Family (2014)
- Aircraft Carrier Ibuki (2019)

=== Television dramas ===
- Ōoka Echizen (1971)
- Taiyō ni Hoero! (1976 ep. 196, 1978 ep. 292, 1979 ep. 376, 1980 ep. 399 and 400, 1986 ep. 710)
- Daitetsujin 17 (1977) (Nomura)
- Mito Kōmon (1990, 1991, 1992, 1993)
- Bayside Shakedown (1997 ep.2)
- Sōrito Yobanaide (1997)
- Nemureru Mori (1998) (General Manager Kujō)
- Aibō (2002, 2013) (Kitamura)
- Tokyo Dogs (2009)
- Salaryman Kintarō 2 (2010) (Sōtarō Hirao)

=== Television animation ===
- The Big O (2003) (Jim McGowan)
- Monster (2004) (Hennig)
- Black Lagoon (2006) (Masahiro Takenaka)
- Fist of the Blue Sky (2006) (Takeshi Kitaōji)
- Golgo 13 (2009) (Baker)
- Yu-Gi-Oh! Zexal (2013) (Abyss)
- Yona of the Dawn (2014) (Son Mun-deok)

=== OVA ===
- Master Keaton (1998) (Pietro Meda)

=== Theatrical animation ===
- The Boy and the Beast (2015)
- Psycho-Pass: The Movie (2015) (Chuan Han)
- Kukuriraige: Sanxingdui Fantasy (Cancelled) (Tsurugi)

=== Video games ===
- Boku no Natsuyasumi (2000) (grandpa)
- Resident Evil 6 (2013) (Japanese dub) (U.S. President Adam Benford)

=== Dubbing roles ===
==== Live-action ====
- Robert De Niro
  - Great Expectations (Arthur Lustig)
  - Ronin (Sam)
  - Showtime (2006 TV Asahi edition) (Detective Mitch Preston)
  - City by the Sea (Vincent LaMarca)
  - Godsend (Richard Wells)
  - Limitless (Carl Van Loon)
  - Amsterdam (Gil Dillenbeck)
- Alec Baldwin
  - The Edge (Robert "Bob" Green)
  - Pearl Harbor (2004 TV Asahi edition) (Jimmy Doolittle)
  - Along Came Polly (Stan Indursky)
  - The Aviator (Juan Trippe)
  - Running with Scissors (Norman Burroughs)
  - Motherless Brooklyn (Moses Randolph)
- 16 Blocks (Det. Frank Nugent (David Morse))
- The Art of Racing in the Rain (Maxwell (Martin Donovan))
- Avengers: Doomsday (Erik Lensherr / Magneto (Ian McKellen)
- Bad Education (Sr. Manuel Berenguer (Lluís Homar))
- Batman Begins (Henri Ducard (Liam Neeson))
- Between Two Ferns: The Movie (David Letterman)
- Breaking and Entering (Bruno Fella (Ray Winstone))
- Brooklyn's Finest (Officer Edward "Eddie" Dugan (Richard Gere))
- Bulletproof (Frank Colton (James Caan))
- Burn Notice (John Barrett (Robert Patrick))
- Caitlin's Way (Jim Lowe (Ken Tremblett))
- Castle Rock (Alan Pangborn (Scott Glenn))
- Chain Reaction (FBI Agent Leon Ford (Fred Ward))
- Charade (2004 DVD edition) (Brian Cruikshank (Cary Grant))
- Charmed (Victor Bennett (James Read))
- The Dark Knight (2012 TV Asahi edition) (Sal Maroni (Eric Roberts))
- The Dark Knight Rises (Ra's al Ghul (Liam Neeson))
- Das Boot (2004 TV Tokyo edition) (Kapitänleutnant Philipp Thomsen (Otto Sander))
- The Departed (Capt. Oliver Queenan (Martin Sheen))
- The Dish (Cliff Buxton (Sam Neill))
- Dong Yi (Oh Tae Suk (Jung Dong Hwan))
- Doom Patrol (Niles Caulder / Chief (Timothy Dalton))
- Dr. Strangelove (Jack D. Ripper (Sterling Hayden))
- Elizabeth I (Sir Francis Walsingham (Patrick Malahide))
- Emmanuelle (1996 TV Tokyo edition) (Mario (Alain Cuny))
- Enemy at the Gates (Major Erwin König (Ed Harris))
- Escape from L.A. (Commander Malloy (Stacy Keach))
- The Fabulous Baker Boys (Frank Baker (Beau Bridges))
- The Fall Guy (The Fall Guy (Lee Majors))
- Far from Home: The Adventures of Yellow Dog (John McCormick (Bruce Davison))
- Game Change (John McCain (Ed Harris))
- The Giver (The Giver (Jeff Bridges))
- Godzilla (Adm. Stenz (David Strathairn))
- Godzilla: King of the Monsters (Adm. Stenz (David Strathairn))
- Guardians of the Galaxy (Jason Quill (Gregg Henry))
- The Guns of Navarone (Miller (David Niven))
- Hannibal (Netflix edition) (Dr. Hannibal Lecter (Anthony Hopkins))
- Harry Potter and the Goblet of Fire (Barty Crouch Senior (Roger Lloyd-Pack))
- How the Grinch Stole Christmas (Mayor Augustus May Who (Jeffrey Tambor))
- Jackie Brown (Max Cherry (Robert Forster))
- K-PAX (Dr. Mark Powell (Jeff Bridges))
- Kangaroo Jack (Salvatore "Sal" Maggio (Christopher Walken))
- Let's Be Cops (Detective Brolin (Andy García))
- Life Is Beautiful (2001 TV Asahi edition) (Uncle Eliseo (Giustino Durano))
- Locked Down (Malcolm (Ben Kingsley))
- The Lord of the Rings: The Two Towers (Théoden (Bernard Hill))
- The Lord of the Rings: The Return of the King (Théoden (Bernard Hill))
- The Matrix Reloaded (Captain Mifune (Nathaniel Lees))
- The Matrix Revolutions (Captain Mifune (Nathaniel Lees))
- Mission: Impossible (2003 TV Asahi edition) (Franz Krieger (Jean Reno))
- Morbius (Dr. Emil Nicholas (Jared Harris))
- Murder Mystery (Malcolm Quince (Terence Stamp))
- The Negotiator (2001 TV Asahi edition) (Commander Adam Beck (David Morse))
- Night at the Museum: Secret of the Tomb (Merenkahre (Ben Kingsley))
- The Ninth Gate (Boris Balkan (Frank Langella))
- O (Coach Duke Goulding (Martin Sheen))
- Paparazzi (Detective Burton (Dennis Farina))
- Paycheck (John Wolfe (Colm Feore))
- Runaway Jury (Durwood Cable (Bruce Davison))
- The Saint (Ivan Petrovich Tretiak (Rade Šerbedžija))
- The Seeker: The Dark Is Rising (Merriman Lyon (Ian McShane))
- The Shawshank Redemption (1997 TBS edition) (Samuel Norton (Bob Gunton))
- The Terminal (Frank Dixon (Stanley Tucci))
- Thirteen Days (2003 TV Asahi edition) (Maxwell D. Taylor (Bill Smitrovich))
- The Towering Inferno (2013 BS Japan edition) (James Duncan (William Holden))
- Trash (Father Juilliard (Martin Sheen))
- The Unit (Tom Ryan (Robert Patrick))
- Up in the Air (Maynard Finch (Sam Elliott))
- Valerian and the City of a Thousand Planets (The President of the World State Federation (Rutger Hauer))
- Vantage Point (President Harry Ashton (William Hurt))
- The Village (Edward Walker (William Hurt))
- The West Wing (Toby Ziegler (Richard Schiff))
- Widows (Harry Rawlings (Liam Neeson))
- The Wolfman (Inspector Francis Aberline (Hugo Weaving))
- Wyatt Earp (Virgil Earp (Michael Madsen))

==== Animation ====
- Star Wars: The Clone Wars (Baron Papanoida)
