= Taiten Kusunoki =

Japanese voice actor (born 1967)

- 楠 大典
- Born: Daisuke Fukuda; March 18, 1967 (age 59); Tokyo, Japan
- Occupations: Actor; voice actor
- Years active: 1990–present
- Agent: Amuleto
- Height: 173 cm (5 ft 8 in)

Daisuke Fukuda (福田 大典, Fukuda Daisuke; born March 18, 1967), better known by his stage name Taiten Kusunoki (楠 大典, Kusunoki Taiten; sometimes spelt Taitem Kusunoki), is a Japanese actor and voice actor from Tokyo. He is affiliated with Amuleto. He is best known for dubbing roles for Vin Diesel, Dwayne Johnson and many more.

== Filmography ==
=== Television animation ===
1995

- Lupin III: The Pursuit of Harimao's Treasure (Harimao)

1996

- KochiKame: Tokyo Beat Cops (Electrode Spark)

1999

- Lupin III: The Columbus Files (Rosalia's Father)
- Weekly Story Land (Robbery, Prisoner)
- Bikkuriman 2000 (Bag Y Yaa, Chiensou)

2000

- Doki Doki Densetsu Mahoujin Guru Guru (Sly)
- Transformers: Robots in Disguise (Black Convoy)

2001

- PaRappa the Rapper (Paul (Ep.2))
- Banner of the Stars II (Dokufu)

2002

- Tokyo Underground (Heat)
- Whistle! (Sayuju Matsushita)
- Shin Megami Tensei Devil Children: Light & Dark (Azrael)

2003

- The Prince of Tennis (Gen'ichirou Sanada)
- Naruto (Gantetsu, Ibiki Morino)
- Transformers: Armada (Rad's Father)
- Tank Knights Portriss (Golda)
- PoPoLoCrois (Gaude)
- Gunslinger Girl (Marcello)

2004

- SD Gundam Force (Epyon, Evil Warrior)
- Shura no Toki: Age of Chaos (Hijikata Toshizou, Kuki Kazuma, Sanada Yukimura)
- Yu-Gi-Oh! Duel Monster GX (Don Zaloog)
- Mobile Suit Gundam Seed Destiny (Alliance Soldier (Ep. 2), Assistant General (Ep. 34), Atlantic Alliance President (Eps. 6, 9), Car Leader (Ep. 18), Herbert von Reinhardt, Logos (Ep. 5), Madd Aves, Mine Guard (Ep. 31), Orb Soldier (Eps. 28, 30), President Joseph Copeland, Shinn's, Father (Eps. 1, 8))
- Meine Liebe (Headmaster)

2005

- Xenosaga: The Animation (Margulis)
- Transformers: Cybertron (Galaxy Convoy)
- Eyeshield 21 (Mamoru Banba, Onihei Yamamoto)
- Idaten Jump (Captain)

2006

- Meine Liebe (Headmaster)
- Ergo Proxy (Al)
- Digimon Data Squad (Rentarou Satsuma)
- Kiba (Tasker)
- Black Lagoon (Boris)
- Demashitaa! Powerpuff Girls Z (Professor Utonium Kitazawa)
- Black Lagoon: The Second Barrage (Boris)
- Souten no Ken (Charles de Guise)
- Venus to Mamoru (Soshi Kikukawa)

2007

- Bleach (Edorad Leones, Zommari Leroux)
- Naruto Shippuden (Ibiki Morino)
- Darker than Black (Lebanon)
- Moribito: Guardian of the Spirit (Casual Kimono)
- Zero no Tsukaima: Futatsuki no Kishi (Mennovil)
- Shigurui: Death Frenzy (Hyouma Funaki)
- Baccano! (Elean Douger)
- Lupin III: The Last Job (Takaya's Father)
- Kaiji (Espoir Blacksuit)
- Dragonaut: The Resonance (Kō Yonamine)
- MapleStory (Gallus)
- Hatara Kizzu Maihamu Gumi (Daiki)

2008

- Zenryoku Usagi (President)
- Yu-Gi-Oh! 5D's (Jin Himuro)
- Neo Angelique Abyss (Mathias)
- Golgo 13 (Sabine Brother Younger)
- Battle Spirits: Shōnen Toppa Bashin (Kyuusaku Kujō/Number Nine)
- One Outs (Dennis Johnson)
- Stitch! (Tachitchu)

2009

- Sgt. Frog (Trunks/Boxers)
- The Beast Player Erin (Taikou)
- Lupin III vs. Detective Conan (Kyle)
- Phantom: Requiem for the Phantom (Tony Stone)
- Dragon Ball Z Kai (Nail)
- Darker than Black: Gemini of the Meteor (Lebanon)
- Welcome to Irabu's Office (Drama Stage Director)
- One Piece (Urouge)

2010

- Battle Spirits: Shōnen Gekiha Dan (Heliostom)
- HeartCatch PreCure! (Professor Sabaaku)
- Giant Killing (Yotaro Natsuki)
- Beyblade: Metal Masters (Argo Gracy)
- Squid Girl (Yūta's Father)

2011

- Tiger & Bunny (Antonio Lopez/Rock Bison)
- Beyblade: Metal Fury (Argo Gracy)
- Nura: Rise of the Yokai Clan: Demon Capital (Gashadokuro)
- Battle Spirits: Heroes (Mahiru Hinobori)
- Horizon in the Middle of Nowhere (Tadatsugu Sakai)

2012

- Sket Dance (Yabuta)
- The Prince of Tennis II (Gen'ichirō Sanada)
- Gon (Sword)
- Zetman (Black Suit B)
- Kingdom (Mou Bu)
- Chōyaku Hyakunin Isshu: Uta Koi (Fujiwara no Michitaka)
- Horizon in the Middle of Nowhere II (Tadatsugu Sakai)
- Code:Breaker (Baba)

2013

- The Unlimited: Hyōbu Kyōsuke (Allen Walsh)
- Beast Saga (Liogre)
- Kingdom 2 (Mou Bu)
- Hunter × Hunter (Morel Mackernasey)
- Love Lab (Masanobu Maki)
- Yowamushi Pedal (Scary People)
- Galilei Donna (Roberto Materrazzi)
- Lupin III: Princess of the Breeze (Koshare)

2014

- Baby Steps (Coach Yusaku Miura)
- Gonna be the Twin-Tail!! (Flea Guildy)
- A Good Librarian Like a Good Shepherd (Nanai)
- One Piece (Rolling Logan)

2015

- Assassination Classroom (Red Eye)
- Baby Steps Season 2 (Coach Yusaku Miura)
- The Heroic Legend of Arslan (Bahadur)
- The Testament of Sister New Devil Burst (Gald)

2016

- Mobile Suit Gundam: Iron-Blooded Orphans (Sandoval Reuters)
- Kuromukuro (Sebastian)
- ClassicaLoid (Bach)

2018

- Hitori no Shita: The Outcast Season 2 (Riku Kin)

2019

- Mob Psycho 100 II (Banshomaru Shinra)
- YU-NO: A Girl Who Chants Love at the Bound of this World (Kōzō Ryūzōji)
- Fire Force (Leonard Burns)
- Kochoki: Wakaki Nobunaga (Oda Nobuhide)
- Food Wars! Shokugeki no Soma: The Fourth Plate (Tosuke Megishima)
- Demon Slayer: Kimetsu no Yaiba (Rokuro)

2020

- Fire Force 2nd Season (Leonard Burns)

2021

- Beastars Season 2 (Ibuki)
- 86 (Reff Adleheit)
- How a Realist Hero Rebuilt the Kingdom (Georg Carmine)
- Edens Zero (Drakken Joe)
- Blade Runner: Black Lotus (Marlowe)

2022

- Tokyo 24th Ward (Gori Suidō)

2023

- Malevolent Spirits: Mononogatari (Kai)
- Vinland Saga Season 2 (Thorgil)
- Sorcerous Stabber Orphen: Chaos in Urbanrama (Damian)
- Undead Girl Murder Farce (Lestrade)
- Bullbuster (Ginnosuke Mutō)

2024

- Chillin' in Another World with Level 2 Super Cheat Powers (Yuigarde)
- Delico's Nursery (Johannes Vlad)
- The Elusive Samurai (Unno Yukiyasu)

2025

- Übel Blatt (Landgrave Schtemwölech)
- Ninja vs. Gokudo (Hanako Saitō)

2026

- The Strongest Job Is Apparently Not a Hero or a Sage, but an Appraiser (Provisional)! (Barth)
- Fist of the North Star (Raoh)
- The Laid-Off Cheat-Granting Mage Enjoys a Second Lease on Life (Balius)

=== OVA ===
- Final Fantasy VII Advent Children (2005) (Rude)

=== ONA ===
- Ninjala (2020) (Van's Father)
- Hanma Baki - Son of Ogre (2021) (Deputy Warden Samuel)
- Tiger & Bunny 2 (2022) (Antonio Lopez/Rock Bison)
- Tekken: Bloodline (Heihachi Mishima)

=== Film animation ===
- The Empire of Corpses (2015) (Frederick Gustavus Burnaby)
- Detective Conan: Sunflowers of Inferno (2015) (Zengo Gotō)
- Promare (2019) (Vulcan Haestus)
- Mobile Suit Gundam SEED Freedom (2024) (Herbert von Reinhard)
- Kukuriraige: Sanxingdui Fantasy (Cancelled)

=== Tokusatsu ===
- Tokumei Sentai Go-Busters the Movie: Protect the Tokyo Enetower! (2012) (Steamloid)
- Shuriken Sentai Ninninger (2015) (Substitution Ninja Mujina (ep. 31 - 32))

=== Drama CDs ===
- 7 Seeds (Tosei Yanagi)
- Abazure (Ichirou Souryuu)
- Mainichi Seiten! series 1 (Taiga Obinata)
- Mainichi Seiten! series 2: Kodomo wa Tomaranai (Taiga Obinata)
- Second Serenade
- Usagigari (Touyama)

=== Video games ===
- Ape Escape series (xxxx-xx) (The Pipotron Brothers, Pipotron Creator, Pipotron G, Pipotron Kuratsuku, Pipotron Meta)
- Call of Duty: Modern Warfare 3 (xxxx, Japanese dub) (Truck)
- Dynasty Warriors 8 (2013) (Lu Su) (including Xtreme Legends)
- Genshin Impact (2020) (Andrius)
- Guilty Gear -STRIVE- (2021) (Nagoriyuki)
- Dynasty Warriors 9 (2018) (Lu Su)
- Hyrule Warriors (2014) (Ganondorf)
- Neo Angelique Abyss (xxxx) (Mathias)
- Sonic the Hedgehog series (2003–present) (E-123 Omega)
- Valkyrie Profile 2: Silmeria (xxxx) (Gabriel Celesta)
- Vampire Hunter D (xxxx) (Machira)
- Wild Arms 4 (2005) (Hugo Hewitt)
- Summon Night 4 (2006) (Sector)
- Crysis (2007, Japanese dub) (Nomad)
- SD Gundam GGenerations Spirits (2007) (Lt. Ken Bederstadt)
- Infinite Undiscovery (2008) (Balbagan)
- Knack (2013, Japanese dub) (Knack)
- Knack 2 (2016, Japanese dub) (Knack)
- The King of Fighters World (2018) (Original Zero, Clone Zero)
- Overwatch (2018, Japanese dub) (Soldier: 76)
- Bloodstained: Ritual of the Night (2018) (Alfred)
- Saint Seiya Awakening (2019) (Jango)
- The King of Fighters All Star (2019) (Original Zero)
- Final Fantasy VII Remake (2020) (Rude)
- Warriors Orochi 4 (2018) (Lu Su)
- Fortnite (2020, Japanese dub) (The Foundation)
- Xenoblade Chronicles 3 (2022) (Cammuravi)
- Arknights (2022) (Sharp)
- Cardfight!! Vanguard Dear Days (2022) (Gosetsu Katsushika)
- Crisis Core: Final Fantasy VII Reunion (2022) (Rude)
- Final Fantasy VII Rebirth (2024) (Rude)
- Street Fighter 6 (2024) (M. Bison (Vega))

=== Dubbing ===
==== Voice-double ====
- Dwayne Johnson
  - Walking Tall – Christopher "Chris" Vaughn, Jr.
  - The Game Plan – Joe Kingman
  - Get Smart – Agent 23
  - Race to Witch Mountain – Jack Bruno
  - Faster – James Cullen
  - Tooth Fairy – Derek Thompson
  - G.I. Joe: Retaliation – Roadblock
  - Snitch – John Matthews
  - Pain & Gain – Paul Doyle
  - Empire State – Detective James Ransone
  - Hercules – Hercules
  - San Andreas – Chief Raymond "Ray" Gaines
  - Jumanji: Welcome to the Jungle – Dr. Smolder Bravestone
  - Rampage – Davis Okoye
  - Skyscraper – William Sawyer
  - Jumanji: The Next Level – Dr. Smolder Bravestone
  - Fighting with My Family – The Rock
  - Red Notice – John Hartley
  - DC League of Super-Pets – Krypto
  - Black Adam – Teth-Adam / Black Adam
  - Red One – Callum Drift
- Vin Diesel
  - The Fast and the Furious (2024 The Cinema edition) – Dominic Toretto
  - A Man Apart – DEA Agent Sean Vetter
  - The Fast and the Furious: Tokyo Drift – Dominic Toretto
  - Fast & Furious – Dominic Toretto
  - Fast Five – Dominic Toretto
  - Fast & Furious 6 – Dominic Toretto
  - Furious 7 – Dominic Toretto
  - The Last Witch Hunter – Kaulder
  - Billy Lynn's Long Halftime Walk – Shroom
  - The Fate of the Furious – Dominic Toretto
  - Bloodshot – Ray Garrison / Bloodshot
  - F9 – Dominic Toretto
  - Fast X – Dominic Toretto
- Dave Bautista
  - Master Z: Ip Man Legacy – Owen Davidson
  - Escape Plan 2: Hades – Trent DeRosa
  - Escape Plan: The Extractors – Trent DeRosa
  - Stuber – Victor Manning
  - Running Wild with Bear Grylls – Dave Bautista
  - Army of the Dead – Scott Ward
  - Army of Thieves – Scott Ward
  - Glass Onion: A Knives Out Mystery – Duke Cody
  - Knock at the Cabin – Leonard Brocht
- Jamie Foxx
  - Shade – Larry Jennings
  - Due Date – Darryl Johnson
  - Django Unchained – Django Freeman
  - Sleepless – Vincent Downs
  - Robin Hood – Little John
  - Project Power – Art
  - Day Shift – Bud Jablonski
  - Back in Action – Matt
- Tyrese Gibson
  - 2 Fast 2 Furious – Roman Pearce
  - Flight of the Phoenix – A.J.
  - Four Brothers – Angel Mercer
  - Annapolis – Midshipman 1st Class Matthew Cole
  - The Take – Adell Baldwin
  - Morbius – Simon Stroud
- Adewale Akinnuoye-Agbaje
  - The Mummy Returns (2005 TV Asahi edition) – Lock-Nah
  - Lost – Mr. Eko
  - G.I. Joe: The Rise of Cobra – Hershel Dalton
  - Annie – Nash
  - Pompeii – Atticus
- Idris Elba
  - RocknRolla – Mumbles
  - Takers – Gordon Thomas "G" Cozier
  - Prometheus – Janek
  - The Mountain Between Us – Dr. Ben Bass
- Mahershala Ali
  - The Hunger Games: Mockingjay – Part 1 – Boggs
  - The Hunger Games: Mockingjay – Part 2 – Boggs
  - Moonlight – Juan
  - Jurassic World Rebirth – Duncan Kincaid

==== Live–action ====
- 12 Angry Men (VHS edition) – Juror #5 (Dorian Harewood)
- 12 Angry Men (2003 NHK edition) – Juror #10 (Mykelti Williamson)
- 12 Rounds – Danny Fisher (John Cena)
- 25th Hour – Frank Slaugherty (Barry Pepper)
- 28 Days Later – Mark (Noah Huntley)
- Across the Universe – Jo-Jo (Martin Luther McCoy)
- Arena – Kaden / The Executioner (Johnny Messner)
- Armageddon (2004 NTV edition) – A.J. Frost (Ben Affleck)
- Avatar: Fire and Ash – Tonowari (Cliff Curtis)
- Avatar: The Way of Water – Tonowari (Cliff Curtis)
- Bacurau – Pacote / Acacio (Thomas Aquino)
- Behind Enemy Lines – Burnett (Owen Wilson)
- Below – Steven Coors (Scott Foley)
- Big Game – Secret Service Agent Morris (Ray Stevenson)
- Blades of Glory – Charles "Chazz" Michael Michaels (Will Ferrell)
- Bleeding Steel – Andre (Callan Mulvey)
- The Bourne Identity – The Professor (Clive Owen)
- Bright – Nick Jakoby (Joel Edgerton)
- Broken City – Carl Fairbanks (Jeffrey Wright)
- Bumblebee – Jack Burns (John Cena)
- The Cloverfield Paradox – Jason Kiel (David Oyelowo)
- Cowboy Bebop – Jet Black (Mustafa Shakir)
- The Crazies – David Dutten (Timothy Olyphant)
- CSI: NY – Sheldon Hawkes (Hill Harper)
- The Dark Knight – Gambol (Michael Jai White)
- Dawn of the Dead – Andre (Mekhi Phifer)
- Die Another Day – Tang Ling Zao (Rick Yune)
- Don't Let Go – Detective Jack Radcliff (David Oyelowo)
- Dr. Dolittle 3 – Bo (Walker Howard)
- Dreamcatcher – Henry Devlin (Thomas Jane)
- ER – Dr. Gregory Pratt (Mekhi Phifer)
- Empire – Lucious Lyon (Terrence Howard)
- Eragon – Ajihad (Djimon Hounsou)
- Evolution – Professor Harry Phineas Block (Orlando Jones)
- Fantastic Four (2008 NTV edition) – Victor von Doom / Doctor Doom (Julian McMahon)
- The Fantastic Four: First Steps – Galactus (Ralph Ineson)
- FBI: Most Wanted – Jess LaCroix (Julian McMahon)
- Final Destination 2 – Eugene Dix (Terrence C. Carson)
- Focus – Nicky Spurgeon (Will Smith)
- The Foreigner – Mr. Mimms (Sherman Augustus)
- Freaks Out – Fulvio (Claudio Santamaria)
- Gangster Squad – Sergeant John O'Mara (Josh Brolin)
- Ghost Ship – Greer (Isaiah Washington)
- Go Fast – Lucien (Jil Milan)
- The Godfather (2008 Blu-Ray/DVD editions) – Virgil Sollozzo (Al Lettieri)
- Honey – Chaz (Mekhi Phifer)
- How to Train Your Dragon – Spitelout Jorgenson (Peter Serafinowicz)
- Iron Sky – Klaus Adler (Götz Otto)
- The Island – Albert Laurent (Djimon Hounsou)
- John Q. – Tuck Lampley (Paul Johansson)
- Killing Eve – Jamie (Danny Sapani)
- King Kong – Benjamin "Ben" Hayes (Evan Parke)
- Kingdom of the Planet of the Apes – Sylva (Eka Darville)
- Ladder 49 – Tommy Drake (Morris Chestnut)
- Lincoln Rhyme: Hunt for the Bone Collector – Lincoln Rhyme (Russell Hornsby)
- The Marine 6: Close Quarters – Luke Trapper (Shawn Michaels)
- The Matrix Reloaded – Captain Ballard (Roy Jones Jr.), Captain Soren (Steve Bastoni)
- Minority Report – Danny Witwer (Colin Farrell)
- Mortal Engines – Chudleigh Pomeroy (Colin Salmon)
- The Neon Demon – Hank (Keanu Reeves)
- O – Odin James (Mekhi Phifer)
- The O.C. – Sandy Cohen (Peter Gallagher)
- Obi-Wan Kenobi – Darth Vader (James Earl Jones)
- The Originals – Elijah Mikaelson (Daniel Gillies)
- P.S. I Love You – Gerry Kennedy (Gerard Butler)
- Paycheck (2008 TV Asahi edition) – Michael Jennings (Ben Affleck)
- Playing with Fire – Jake "Supe" Carson (John Cena)
- The Pope's Exorcist – Father Gabriele Amorth (Russell Crowe)
- The Possession – Clyde Brenek (Jeffrey Dean Morgan)
- Project ALF – Dexter Moyers (Miguel Ferrer)
- Proven Innocent – Ezekiel "EZ" Boudreau (Russell Hornsby)
- The Purge – James Sandin (Ethan Hawke)
- Rachel Getting Married – Sidney (Tunde Adebimpe)
- Ready Player One – Nolan Sorrento / IOI–655321 (Ben Mendelsohn)
- Reign of Fire – Creedy (Gerard Butler)
- Reign Over Me – Dr. Alan Johnson (Don Cheadle)
- River Queen – Wiremu (Cliff Curtis)
- The Rock (1999 NTV edition) – Private McCoy (Steve Harris)
- Rogue One – Darth Vader (James Earl Jones)
- S. Darko – Justin Sparrow (James Lafferty)
- Santa's Slay – Santa Claus (Bill Goldberg)
- Scarface (2004 DVD edition) – Manolo "Manny Ray" Ribera (Steven Bauer)
- Selma – Martin Luther King Jr. (David Oyelowo)
- Shazam! – Victor Vasquez (Cooper Andrews)
- Shazam! Fury of the Gods – Victor Vasquez (Cooper Andrews)
- Shock Wave – Hung Kai-pang (Jiang Wu)
- Snatch – Sol (Lennie James)
- The Sopranos – Silvio Dante (Steven Van Zandt)
- Space Jam: A New Legacy – LeBron James
- Spell – Marquis T. Woods (Omari Hardwick)
- Starship Troopers 3: Marauder – General Dix Hauser (Boris Kodjoe)
- Straight Outta Compton – Lorenzo "MC Ren" Patterson (Aldis Hodge)
- Street Fighter – M. Bison (David Dastmalchian)
- Suicide Squad – Monster T (Common)
- Thor: Ragnarok – Skurge (Karl Urban)
- Top Gun (2005 NTV edition) – LTJG Ron "Slider" Kerner (Rick Rossovich)
- Top Gun: Maverick – Solomon "Warlock" Bates (Charles Parnell)
- Torque – Trey Wallace (Ice Cube)
- Trance – Nate (Danny Sapani)
- Transformers – Jazz (Darius McCrary)
- Trespass – Elias (Ben Mendelsohn)
- Vinyl – Zak Yankovich (Ray Romano)
- Virus (2002 NTV edition) – Richie Mason (Sherman Augustus)
- Warcraft – Durotan (Toby Kebbell)
- When in Rome – Lance (Jon Heder)
- Woodlawn – Coach Tandy Gerelds (Nicholas Bishop)
- X-Men: Days of Future Past – Lucas Bishop (Omar Sy)
- XXX – Kolya (Petr Jákl)
- Zoey's Extraordinary Playlist – Mitch Clarke (Peter Gallagher)

==== Animated ====
- Isle of Dogs (Chief)
- Love, Death & Robots (Sergeant Nielson)
- Surf's Up (Tank "The Shredder" Evans)
- Surf's Up 2: WaveMania (Tank "The Shredder" Evans)
- Wreck-It Ralph (M. Bison)
- Gargoyles (Goliath)
- GI Joe Extreme (Lt. Stone)
- Justice League (John Stewart/Green Lantern)
- Justice League Unlimited (John Stewart/Green Lantern)
- Maya & Miguel (Theo McEwen)
- Power Rangers Lightspeed Rescue (Diabolico)
- Spider-Man: The Animated Series (Doctor Curt Connors/The Lizard, Shocker, others)
- Spider-Man and His Amazing Friends (Shocker)
- Star Wars: The Clone Wars (Dengar)
- Static Shock (John Stewart/Green Lantern)
- Superman: The Animated Series (Sgt. Corey Mills)
- Tinker Bell and the Pirate Fairy (Yang)
- Transformers Adventure (Optimus Prime)
