= Godzilla Singular Point =

Japanese kaiju television series

- Promotional release poster

ゴジラ S.P ＜シンギュラポイント＞ (Gojira S.P <Shingyura Pointo>)
- Genre: Kaiju, Science fiction
- Anime television series
- Directed by: Atsushi Takahashi
- Produced by: Takashi Yoshizawa; Naoki Amano; Kiyotaka Waki
- Written by: Toh EnJoe
- Music by: Kan Sawada
- Studio: Bones; Orange
- Licensed by: Netflix (streaming rights)
- Original network: Tokyo MX, KBS, BS11, SUN
- Original run: April 1, 2021 – June 24, 2021
- Episodes: 13

Godzilla Singular Point (Japanese: ゴジラ S.P ＜シンギュラポイント＞, Hepburn: Gojira Shingyura Pointo) is a Japanese anime television series directed by Atsushi Takahashi and written by Toh EnJoe. Produced by the animation studios Bones and Orange and licensed by Netflix, the series premiered on March 25, 2021, on Netflix in Japan, and on Tokyo MX and other channels on April 1 to June 24, 2021. The series is part of the Godzilla franchise and features monsters from its Shōwa era (1954–1975). In 2023, EnJoe suggested that a second season of the series may be produced.

== Plot ==
In Nigashio City, Chiba Prefecture in the year 2030, engineer Yun Arikawa of the local "do-it-all" shop Otaki Factory investigates happenings in a Western-style mansion, long thought abandoned. Mei Kamino, a graduate student studying imaginary creatures, investigates mysterious signals received from Misakioku, the former Tsuguno district's administrative building. These two strangers, investigating mysteries in two different locations, both hear the same song. As they are brought together by this common mystery, they are led into a battle against an unprecedented threat to the universe.

== Characters ==
Characters	Japanese	English
Mei Kamino (神野 銘)	Yume Miyamoto	Erika Harlacher
Yun Arikawa (有川 ユン)	Shōya Ishige	Johnny Yong Bosch
Haberu Kato (加藤 侍)	Tarō Kiuchi	Stephen Fu
Goro Otaki (大滝 吾郎)	Wataru Takagi	Keith Silverstein
Satomi Kanahara (金原 さとみ)	Ayako Takeuchi	Brittany Cox
Pelops II (ペロ2,)	Misaki Kuno	Cassandra Lee Morris
Yung (ユング); Jet Jaguar (ジェットジャガー)	Rie Kugimiya	Kira Buckland
Shunya Satō (佐藤 隼也)	Yōhei Azakami	Billy Kametz
Tsunetomo Yamamoto (山本 常友)	Jin Urayama	Keone Young
Yukie Kanoko (鹿子 行江)	Kotori Koiwai	Reba Buhr
Takehiro Kai (海 建宏)	Kenichi Suzumura	Griffin Puatu
Guiying Li (李 桂英)	Kaho Kōda	Anne Yatco
Bearach "BB" Byrne/Bayler "BB" Barn (ベイラ・バーン "BB")	Ryōtarō Okiayu	Sean Chiplock
Leena Byrne/Rina Barn (リーナ・バーン)	Runa Onodera	Kimberly Anne Campbell
Yoshiyasu Matsubara (松原 美保)	Tomoyuki Shimura	Christopher Swindle
Makita K. Nakagawa (マキタ・K・中川)	Hiromichi Tezuka	Joe Ochman
Tilda Miller (ティルダ・ミラー)	Masako Isobe	Barbara Goodson
Michael Steven (マイケル・スティーブン)	Kenta Miyake	James C. Mathis III

== Production ==
On October 6, 2020, Toho Animation and Netflix announced plans for an anime Godzilla series, titled Godzilla Singular Point. It aired from April 1 to June 24, 2021, on Tokyo MX and other channels. Production for the show is by Bones in partnership with Orange, blending hand-drawn and computer animation styles respectively. Atsushi Takahashi served as the director, with scripts by Toh EnJoe and music composed by Kan Sawada, who incorporates Akira Ifukube's themes into the series. Character design was handled by Blue Exorcist manga creator Kazue Kato, with former Studio Ghibli animator Eiji Yamamori designing the monsters. The series' opening theme, "in case...", is performed by BiSH, while Polkadot Stingray performed the ending theme song "Aoi" (青い, Blue). There is also the recurring insert theme "ALAPU UPALA", performed by Indian-American singer Annette Philip, which is utilized in the storyline as a plot device. The series debuted earlier on Netflix in Japan on March 25, 2021, which was followed by a global release on June 24, 2021.

== Episode list ==
No.	English localized title / English translated title Original Japanese title	Directed by	Written by	Original release date
1	"Terzetto" / "A Distant Road Home"; Transliteration: "Haruka Naru Ieji" (Japanese: はるかなるいえじ)	Noriyuki Nomata, Takuma Suzuki	Toh EnJoe	April 1, 2021
In Japan of the year 2030, Yun Arikawa and Haberu Katō, two employees of the "do-it-all" Otaki Factory, are hired to investigate strange power fluctuations at an abandoned mansion. They find a hidden radio picking up a repeating broadcast, which Yun identifies as an old Indian folk song, and trace it to a radio-monitoring station called Misakioku, where graduate student Mei Kamino is brought in to investigate a strange alarm that she discovers is connected to the same broadcast. Mei is later contacted online by a copy of Naratake, a popular AI created by Yun, which she renames "Pelops II." Yun and Haberu's boss, eccentric engineer Gorō Ōtaki, theorizes that Misakioku and the broadcast are part of SETI, and are connected to alien activity. Gorō publicly unveils his newest creation, a giant prototype humanoid robot called Jet Jaguar, at a local festival, but the event is thrown into chaos when a mutated Pteranodon called Rodan suddenly appears. It is revealed that the secret basement of Misakioku houses the skeleton of a giant creature.
2	"Gamesome" / "Midsummer Oni Festival"; Transliteration: "Manatsu Oni Matsuri" (Japanese: まなつおにまつり)	Daisuke Tsukushi, Takuma Suzuki	Toh EnJoe	April 8, 2021
Gorō pilots Jet Jaguar into battle against Rodan, but the monster overpowers the robot and severs its right arm, knocking it offline. Yun and Gorō distract Rodan while Jet Jaguar reboots its systems, after which the robot manages to fight off the monster. Rodan tries to fly away, but suddenly falls back to the ground and dies. Gorō theorizes that Rodan's appearance is connected to an ancient prophecy regarding "the end of all things", while Yun discovers that Rodan might have been attracted to the city by the strange broadcast, as its roar generates strange radio waves as well. Over the next few days, several other dead Rodans are discovered in various different locations. Pelops II publishes Mei's notes on "extra-dimensional lifeforms" online, and she receives an invitation to speak with a Professor Li regarding her theories. Gorō, Yun, and Haberu prepare to search for more Rodans using a homemade radio beacon, while a giant flock of Rodans emerge from the ocean off the coast of Japan.
3	"Tigerish" / "Nobae's Terror"; Transliteration: "Nobae no Kyōfu" (Japanese: のばえのきょうふ)	Noriyuki Nomata, Takuma Suzuki	Toh EnJoe	April 15, 2021
Thousands of Rodans descend on Japan, attacking power lines and other sources of electricity. Gorō, Yun, and Haberu use their radio beacon to try to lure the Rodans away from the city, but Yun and Haberu's car crashes and they are forced to take shelter with other civilians. Mei and Pelops II travel to Tokyo to meet with Professor Li. After learning about the attack, Pelops II remotely takes control of one of Otaki Factory's repair robots to check on the situation. Yun, Haberu, and the civilians distract the Rodans with improvised noisemakers, allowing them to retrieve the radio beacon. Pelops II intervenes using the borrowed robot, which is eventually destroyed by the Rodans. While leading the Rodans away, Yun and Haberu are surprised when the creatures begin to fall out of the air and die, just as the first one did. Scientists theorize that the creatures died because they originated from a different environment. Mei is invited to join Professor Li's research project in Dubai. Yun and Mei contact each other online with help from Pelops II, and Yun gives her a code to solve. Meanwhile, a military submarine is followed by the mysterious amphibious creature.
4	"Gadabout" / "The Future Not Yet Seen"; Transliteration: "Mada Minu Mirai wa" (Japanese: まだみぬみらいは)	Tsuyoshi Tobita, Takuma Suzuki	Toh EnJoe	April 22, 2021
Two fishermen trying to find clear waters amid a "red tide" outbreak around Japan are attacked by aquatic, serpent-like monsters. Yun theorizes that Misakioku summoned the Rodans by broadcasting the song, but after contacting them he discovers that it was broadcast by accident. Scientists discover that the Rodans were coated in red dust. Yun and Haberu visit an area where the dead Rodans are being disposed of, and question Shunya Satō, a worker at Misakioku, about the broadcast. In the process, Satō reveals the existence of the giant skeleton in Misakioku's basement. Yun and Haberu discover that one of the dead Rodans has been taken by something. Mei arrives in Dubai and attends a lecture by Professor Li on "archetypes", crystal cubes with highly unusual molecular properties. Yun and Haberu begin following unusual tracks in the forest and discover the partially-consumed remains of the dead Rodan. They encounter freelance journalist Kai Takehiro, who has been tracking a new, unknown creature. Mei and Pelops II decipher Yun's code, and conclude that the "archetypes" could not have been created in the normal universe. Soldiers in the forest are attacked by Anguirus, an mutated Ankylosaur.
5	"Theorist" / "As Swift as the Wind"; Transliteration: "Hayaki Koto Kaze no" (Japanese: はやきことかぜの)	Satoshi Nakagawa, Takuma Suzuki	Toh EnJoe	April 29, 2021
The fishermen are rescued from the serpents, nicknamed Manda by the media. Professor Li confirms Mei's suspicions involving the properties of the archetypes, and reveals that she acquired the information from someone named Professor Ashihara. Meanwhile, a survey team led by Professor Li's colleague BB visits a cavern in India containing a "lake" of red dust, but is interrupted by the emergence of another monster, Salunga, and escapes before the cavern is sealed again. Yun, Haberu, and Kai cross paths with two hunters, who later encounter Anguirus. The hunters shoot at Anguirus, who escapes unharmed. The archetypes seem to be made from the red dust, which can only be mined in a few locations around the world. Rodans are reported all around the world, while the emergences of the other monsters add to the panic. Yun deduces that Anguirus can foresee the short-term future by vibrating its spines to create an energy field that deflects bullets. An operation is carried out to capture Anguirus, which grows larger. Gen, an old colleague of Gorō's, tries to kill Anguirus with a harpoon gun, to no avail. Piloting a fully-repaired Jet Jaguar, Gorō then joins the fight.
6	"Enfatico" / "Numbers Without Theory"; Transliteration: "Riron Naki Sūji" (Japanese: りろんなきすうじ)	Daisuke Tsukushi, Takuma Suzuki, Shūji Miyahara	Toh EnJoe	May 6, 2021
Rodans descend on New York City. Mei begins looking into Ashihara's research from the 1960s and finds a reference to something called the "Orthogonal Diagonalyzer", before being approached by government agent Yukie Konoko, who unknowingly helps her realize that the archetypes can bend and distort the fabric of spacetime. Intrigued by this, Professor Li invites Mei to join her for a trip to London. In Japan, Gorō and Jet Jaguar continue their battle with Anguirus, who overpowers Jet Jaguar and then defeats a team of soldiers. Gorō borrows Gen's harpoon gun, with which Jet Jaguar fires at Anguirus from point-blank range to bypass its precognition, seemingly killing it. In Tokyo Bay, a military fleet intercepts the Mandas, which they discover are being pursued by a bigger monster. Anguirus regains consciousness, having only been wounded by the harpoon, and goes on a rampage. Gorō pilots Jet Jaguar against Anguirus, who decapitates Jet Jaguar. Gorō is knocked unconscious. Yun uses his AI Naratake, to bring Jet Jaguar back online, and pilots it back into the fight. Jet Jaguar fires another point-blank harpoon into Anguirus's head and kills it, breaking off one of its spikes in the process. However, the explosion knocks Yun unconscious.
7	"Omniarch" / "The Question Mark of Time"; Transliteration: "Jikan no Gimonfu" (Japanese: じかんのぎもんふ)	Daisuke Tsukushi, Takuma Suzuki, Shūji Miyahara	Toh EnJoe	May 13, 2021
The giant amphibious creature is revealed to be Godzilla, a mythical beast prophesied to bring about the Apocalypse. Godzilla and the Mandas reach Tokyo, where the former kills a Manda, adopts an amphibious form, and leaves the water. Mei and Professor Li theorize that the archetypes have an extra-dimensional structure; they are mined from Singular Points, which are rare mineral veins. Rodans enter Tokyo, spreading more red dust. The archetypes are made from the dust, and Ashihara predicted that the monsters would emerge from it. Only the thirteenth and final phase of the archetypes, the "Orthogonal Diagonalyzer", can neutralize the dust and stop the monsters. Gorō uses Anguirus's broken spike to create a spear for Jet Jaguar to confront Godzilla. Satō returns to Misakioku and discovers that the song broadcast originates from the Godzilla skeleton there, but is knocked unconscious by Kai. BB returns to the containment facility built over the cavern in India, where Salunga breaks free using a storm of red dust. BB activates a prototype of the Diagonalyzer, which causes the dust to crystallize into spikes that impale Salunga, trapping it again. Yun fully converts Naratake into a piloting system for Jet Jaguar.
8	"Graftage" / "Phantom Figure"; Transliteration: "Maboroshi no Sugata" (Japanese: まぼろしのすがた)	Noriyuki Nomata, Takuma Suzuki, Shūji Miyahara	Toh EnJoe	May 20, 2021
As the Japanese military launches an attack on Godzilla, it counterattacks by spewing super-cooled gas, which results in an explosion that seemingly kills Godzilla and causes the red dust clouds to dissipate. En route to Tokyo, the Otaki crew discover the beached carcass of a partially eaten Manda. Satō begins investigating Ashihara to try to discover his location. En route to meet with BB, Mei and Professor Li reach London, just as it comes under attack by Mandas and Rodans. Li takes Mei to Professor Ashihara's former home; Ashihara attempted to look into the future using a time-bending supercomputer, but discovered evidence of a catastrophe involving red dust that would take place in 2030, driving him to look for a way to prevent the catastrophe from happening. Gorō, Yun, Haberu, and Jet Jaguar discover a weblike structure covering a building near the dead Manda, and are attacked by six Kumongas, the gigantic spider. One Kumonga almost kills Yun, who is saved by Jet Jaguar. Jet Jaguar kills all the Kumongas except for one, which escapes along with a captured civilian. As they begin searching for him, the seemingly-dead Kumongas are revived, while dozens more emerge from the building.
9	"Erumpent" / "Those Who Fall"; Transliteration: "Taore Yuku Hito no" (Japanese: たおれゆくひとの)	Daisuke Chiba, Takuma Suzuki, Atsushi Takahashi	Toh EnJoe	May 27, 2021
The Japanese military carries out a bombing run to destroy Godzilla's petrified body, but its outer shell shatters, revealing that it transformed into a fully-terrestrial form. It releases a cloud of red dust that covers Tokyo. With another bombing run, the military attacks Godzilla, which now can reshape parts of its body into armor that withstands the blasts. Meanwhile, Yun theorizes that the Catastrophe might be due to the Singular Points becoming more numerous and unstable; Mei theorizes that Ashihara was trying to stop it from happening. She presents her conclusions to Li, Li's colleague Michael Steven, BB, and BB's superior Tilda, who do not believe that the Catastrophe will happen, and are more concerned with developing Ashihara's time-bending technology. They are later attacked by Rodans, who kill Li while Mei is forced to flee. Meanwhile, Salunga disappears from the Shiva facility. Gorō and Haberu rescue the trapped civilian from the Kumongas' web, who flee while Jet Jaguar covers them. Jet Jaguar sets the web on fire to act as a diversion, enabling the team to escape on a boat. From out at sea, they see the storm of dust over Tokyo; the Catastrophe seems to be beginning.
10	"Encipher" / "Principles of Mechanics"; Transliteration: "Rikigaku no Genri" (Japanese: りきがくのげんり)	Geisei Morita, Takuma Suzuki, Atsushi Takahashi	Toh EnJoe	June 3, 2021
Godzilla spreads red dust through Tokyo. It is attacked by a giant, more advanced Rodan. Firing energy, Godzilla kills it. Godzilla is also a Singular Point. Yun and Haberu return to the abandoned mansion, and discover that coded numbers in the song are also in Ashihara's notes; Ashihara was listening to the broadcast using the hidden radio. He grew up in a fishing village which was destroyed by a monster similar to Godzilla. The monster was eventually killed, and Ashihara purchased the Misakioku facility to conceal and study its skeleton. The coded times and dates correspond to messages that Yu and Mei exchanged regarding the archetypes and the Catastrophe. In India, Mei is greeted by Lina, BB's daughter, who escorts her to the Shiva Consortium's headquarters. Salunga escapes from the Shiva facility via a cave network, surfaces in a village nearby and begins rampaging through it, generating a storm of red dust. BB and his soldiers use their Diagonalyzer rockets to crystallize the dust, impaling Salunga on the resulting spikes. In Tokyo, the broadcast from Misakioku begins again, while the military attacks Godzilla. Godzilla undergoes another transformation, and fires an atomic breath from its mouth, destroying part of Tokyo.
11	"Relaunch" / "Irrational Sheet Music"; Transliteration: "Rifujin na Gakufu" (Japanese: りふじんながくふ)	Son Seunghee, Takuma Suzuki	Toh EnJoe	June 10, 2021
At Misakioku, Kai and an armed group remove the giant skeleton. The skeleton is another Singular Point. According to Yun, the Points are connected and must be destroyed to save the world. In Tokyo, the growing cloud of red dust causes a rainstorm and earthquakes. In India, Mei is taken to the Shiva Consortium's facility; Ashihara's time-bending supercomputer is housed within, above an underground Point that is being pulled to the surface, which will be used to complete the computer. Tilda refuses to believe that the Catastrophe is real. BB steals all but one of the facility's Diagonalyzers and sends most of them to locations around the world, in accordance with Li's dying wish. A Diagonalyzer reaches Konoko in Japan. Michael helps BB, Mei, and Lina escape. At the temple where Salunga surfaced, they plan to follow its trail back to the cavern beneath the facility. There, Kai, who also works for the Consortium, appears. Michael and Kai depart. In Japan, Jet Jaguar begins upgrading itself; the messages were channeling data for the upgrade. When the upgrade completes, Jet Jaguar's self-awareness grows. It provides coordinates for a point in the sky above Tokyo.
12	"Explorer" / "End of the Battle"; Transliteration: "Tatakai no Owari" (Japanese: たたかいのおわり)	Noriyuki Nomata, Nao Miyoshi, Takuma Suzuki	Toh EnJoe	June 17, 2021
Mei, BB, Lina, and Pelops II access the Shiva containment facility. When Ashihara's supercomputer was first tested twenty years earlier, it resulted in an explosion. The explosion may have happened because the supercomputer created a brief portal to the time of the Catastrophe. Ashihara disappeared after the explosion, having supposedly died in the blast. In Tokyo, dangerous plant life grows from the red dust. Jet Jaguar defends a military convoy headed by Konoko from Rodans. Konoko gives the Diagonalyzer to Yun. Yun may be the only person who knows how to use it, but needs the activation code. The coordinates given for the arrival of Mei's next message match the location of Godzilla, which is resting at Tokyo Station and grew to 100 meters in height. Beneath the facility, Mei's team reaches the contained Singular Point, but the space-time distortion caused by it begins to expand, and the number of possible futures is multiplying, as the Catastrophe will occur in three hours. On the surface, Salunga breaks free of the spikes. Pelops II also begins multiplying due to the growing number of possible futures, before going offline. The broadcast song begins playing again, this time coming from the supercomputer. (Note: Glowing moths, implied to be the race of Mothra species, are featured in this episode.)
13	"Together" / "The Two of the Beginning"; Transliteration: "Hajimari no Futari" (Japanese: はじまりのふたり)	Atsushi Takahashi	Toh EnJoe	June 24, 2021
Pelops II reactivates, having merged with its alternate versions. Ashihara initiated a calculation during the test twenty years earlier, which was interrupted by the explosion and was never finished. It is an attempt to stop the Catastrophe. In Tokyo, the Otaki team and their military escorts fight Godzilla and various Rodans. Salunga breaks into the Shiva facility, descends into the cavern, and begins destroying the seal around the Singular Point. The song is a coded message sent from the future. Pelops II discovers its true meaning and sends it to Yun before the supercomputer explodes, destroying Pelops II. In Tokyo, Godzilla kills the Rodans. Jet Jaguar receives the upgrade code and transforms into its flying form. Jet Jaguar's new controlling intelligence is an AI system from the future, a descendant of Pelops II and Naratake, which was broadcasting its own code back through time using the song. Godzilla destroys Jet Jaguar with atomic breath, which triggers a Diagonalyzer explosion that converts the red dust into harmless crystals. The crystals impale and freeze Salunga in place, while Godzilla disappears. Michael and Kai later oversee the conversion of the skeleton from Misakioku into a weaponized mecha. (Note: Implied to be Mechagodzilla.) An aged Ashihara is there.

== Marketing ==
First images and poster art were released on October 26, 2020, during Netflix's Anime Festival, with the streaming service releasing a teaser trailer later that same day. The teaser revealed that the series would air in April 2021 and would feature monsters and characters from the Shōwa era of the Godzilla franchise, such as Rodan, Anguirus, Jet Jaguar, Manda, and what initially appeared to be Titanosaurus and Gabara—the latter two later being revealed as new kaiju Godzilla Aquatilis and Salunga. On October 12, 2020, it was announced that Takahashi, EnJoe, Bones producer Naoki Amano, Orange producer Jiro Ando, and Toho producer Takashi Yoshizawa would all appear in a panel during the Godzilla Fest Online 2020 event on November 3, 2020. On February 12, 2021, the full design of Godzilla was revealed, illustrated by Eiji Yamamori and colored by Yūji Kaneko.

Godzilla Singular Point received a DVD/Blu-ray release in Japan in three separate volumes: the first volume was released on August 18, 2021, with the other two on September 22 and October 20. The show also received Bandai soft vinyl action figures as part of the Movie Monster series toyline. The first to be revealed was of Jet Jaguar and Godzilla in his Ultima form on March 6, 2021, in Japan. These two were later followed up by another vinyl figure of Godzilla in his Aquatilis form on April 17. Vinyl figures of Angurius and Manda were released on April 24. A vinyl figure of Godzilla in his Amphibia form to follow on May 15, and his Terrestris form one week later on May 22.

== Reception ==
=== Critical reception ===
On the review aggregator website Rotten Tomatoes, 56% of 9 critics' reviews are positive, with an average rating of 5.1/10.

=== Accolades ===
Godzilla Singular Point won VFX-Japan Awards' 2022 "Excellence" and "Best" awards in the Television/Distribution Program Anime CG Category. It was also nominated for the 42nd Nihon SF Taisho Award. The anime series was awarded the 53rd Seiun Award in the Best Media category in 2022.

== Potential sequel ==
When questioned by a fan on Twitter about the possibility of a sequel to Godzilla Singular Point, the screenwriter Toh EnJoe told the user: "Due to the contract, all I can say is 'There may or may not be a next season'." Director Atsushi Takahashi would acknowledge this via retweeting EnJoe's response a few days later.

== See also ==
- Godzilla (1978 TV series)
- Godzilla: The Series
- Godzilla: Planet of the Monsters
- Godzilla: City on the Edge of Battle
- Godzilla: The Planet Eater
