= Takashi Nakamura =

Japanese anime director (born 1955)

- Born: September 12, 1955 (age 71); Yamanashi Prefecture, Japan
- Occupations: Animator; Anime director

Takashi Nakamura (中村 たかし ( なかむら たかし), Nakamura Takashi; born September 12, 1955 in Yamanashi Prefecture, Japan) is a Japanese animator and anime director. He is also a founding member of the Japan Animation Creators Association (JAniCA) labor group.

Nakamura's 2002 film A Tree of Palme was an official selection of the Berlin Film Festival. He also worked on Golden Warrior Gold Lightan, with his first student Koji Morimoto.

== Works ==
- Yatterman (1977): animation director and key animation
- Ōgon Senshi Gold Lightan (1981): animation director and key animation
- Genma Taisen (1983): key animation
- Mirai Keisatsu Urashiman (1983): character designs, animation director, key animation, storyboards
- Nausicaä of the Valley of the Wind (1984): key animation
- Meikyū Monogatari (1987): animation director
- Robot Carnival (1987): director, script, character designs, animation
- AKIRA (1988): animation director, character designs
- Peter Pan no Bōken (1989): character designs, scene artist, storyboards
- Catnapped! (1995): director, original creator, script, character design, animation director
- Sonic the Hedgehog (OVA) (1996): colour background painter
- A Tree of Palme (2002): director, original creator, script
- Tetsujin 28-go (2004): character designs and storyboards
- Fantastic Children (2004): director, original creator, script, character designs
- Harmony (2015): director (with Michael Arias)
- Ballmastrz: Rubicon (2023): animation director

== Books ==
- Yume no Naka e (夢の中へ). Tokuma Motion Book, 1985.
- Catnapped! Storyboard (とつぜん!ネコの国 バニパルウィット 絵コンテ). Triangle Staff.
- Twilight (TWILIGHT). Anime Style, 2006. ISBN 978-4902948035
- King Abyss (キングアビス). Jive, 2009. ISBN 978-4861766220
- King Abyss: Adama hen (キングアビス アダマ篇). PIE International, 2014. Vol.1: ISBN 978-4756244611 Vol.2: ISBN 978-4756244628
