= Genocidal Organ =

2007 novel by Project Itoh

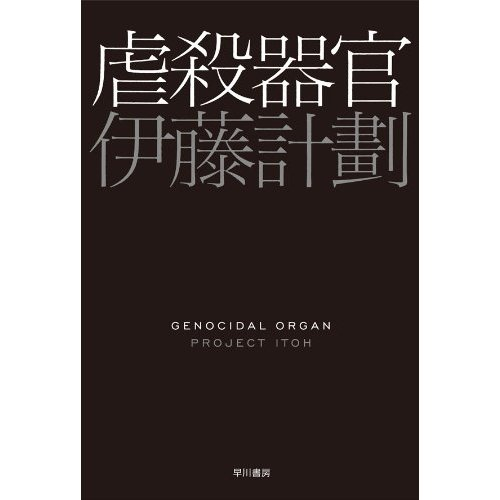
- Author: Keikaku Itoh
- Language: Japanese
- Genre: Science fiction
- Publisher: Hayakawa Publishing (Japanese); Viz Media (English)
- Publication date: 2007 (Hayakawa SF Series/JCollection); 2010 (paperback)
- Publication place: Japan
- English publication date: 2012
- Media type: Print (paperback)
- Pages: 282 (Hayakawa SF Series/JCollection); 431 (paperback)
- ISBN: 978-4-15-030984-8

Genocidal Organ (虐殺器官, Gyakusatsu Kikan) is the debut novel of Japanese science fiction writer Keikaku Itoh. It was first published by Hayakawa Publishing in 2007 and later re-printed in 2010 in paperback form. A poll by the yearly SF magazine SF ga yomitai ranked Genocidal Organ as the number one domestic SF novel of the decade.

The English translation of Genocidal Organ, translated by Edwin Hawkes, was published in August 2012 by Haikasoru / Viz Media.

== Plot ==
When Sarajevo was destroyed by a homemade nuclear weapon, the leading democracies of the world transformed into surveillance states, where each individual is constantly monitored, watched, and wired. While the developed nations of the world entered this state, the developing countries around the world endured a multitude of genocidal wars. Those developing countries went from harmony to complete destruction in about 6–8 months, with all of the events and evidence pointing to one suspect, an American named John Paul.

Clavis Shepherd, a US Special Forces Officer, along with his team of advanced super-soldiers, are tasked with finding and eliminating John Paul. They want to know how one man can cause so much destruction and death.

Eventually, Clavis manages to track down John Paul, who confirms that he has discovered the existence of a "genocidal organ" naturally present in mankind that can be activated using a sequence of words, which he calls the "genocide grammar." He explains that he used it to cause massive civil wars in the rest of the world, believing it to be the only way to protect the United States and the rest of the "First World" from terrorism and resentment in the "Third World". Clavis, unmoved, takes him into custody, only to see him dying after an assassination operation carried out by his own intelligence unit, who were ordered to kill him to prevent the end of the "peace" carried out by the surveillance states.

Consequently, Clavis discovers the truth from Paul's personal effects: the genocidal organ is actually the result of a massive program of subliminal messages under the name of Operation John Paul, led by a group called the "First World Order." This group, which was most likely also behind that city's nuclear destruction, used the massive media coverage of the destruction of Sarajevo to start their operation. In fact, John Paul was originally the American agent in charge of the program, but unlike their original plan, Paul managed to escape their grasp, disappearing into the chaos of the wars that followed, creating a network of Resistance cells against his own former bosses. Paul's notes also underline that he found the true intention of the whole ordeal: to exploit the world's crises and impose an "Order of Nations," transforming the world into a one-world government, militarized and controlled by its new masters. As a last resort, Paul created a new sequence of words to activate his "genocidal" program in the English-speaking world, which, just like the rest of the world population, had received the subliminal message of genocidal organs.

The revelation causes an immense conflict within Clavis. Despite having seen firsthand the results of the genocidal organs, he is also forced to admit that America and the rest of the First World are the real culprits of the world's suffering and devastation and that in any case, while America is still standing, they have practically killed the "American dream" and imposed a convenient "First World truth." Clavis decides to go forward with Paul's plan. He leaks the information so that he can be called to a military hearing in Washington DC, watched from afar by the Joint Chiefs of Staff and the general public. Clavis, despite having no illusion about the future or that he is doing the right thing, then activates the program, causing a second civil war centered on America.

== Anime film and manga ==
An animated film adaptation, directed and written by Shūkō Murase, and produced at Manglobe, was scheduled to be released on November 13, 2015. However, due to Manglobe's bankruptcy, the film's release was postponed. It was later announced on November 13, 2015, that production on the film had resumed with the same staff under the newly created Geno Studio, with hoped to complete the film by the end of 2016. The film was released on February 3, 2017. Prior to the film's theatrical screening in Japan, the first fifteen minutes were shown on October 31, 2016, at the 2016 Tokyo International Film Festival. Funimation screened the film in select U.S. theatres on July 12 and 13, 2017.

A three-volume manga by Asou Gatou based on the novel was published by Kadokawa Shoten in Newtype from 2015 to 2017.

=== Voice cast ===
Character	Japanese voice actor	English dubbing actor
Clavis Shepherd	Yuichi Nakamura	Josh Grelle
Williams	Satoshi Mikami	Ian Sinclair
Leland	Kaito Ishikawa	Joel McDonald
Alex	Yūki Kaji	Clifford Chapin
Lucie Škroupova	Sanae Kobayashi	Jeannie Tirado
Rockwell	Akio Ōtsuka	Christopher Sabat
John Paul	Takahiro Sakurai	Ricco Fajardo

== See also ==
- Cure
- Darwin's Nightmare
- Sapir–Whorf hypothesis
